= 2020 British Champions Series =

Tenth edition of the horse racing series comprising 35 of the UK's top flat races

- Sport: Horse racing
- Duration: 5 June – 17 October 2020

Leading Horse
- Highest Rated: Ghaiyyath
- Rating: 127 (Eclipse Stakes)

Leading Jockey
- Winner: Jim Crowley
- Win / 2nd / 3rd: 6 / 0 / 2

Leading Trainer
- Winner: John Gosden
- Win / 2nd / 3rd: 8 / 2 / 6

Seasons
- ← 2019 2021 →

The 2020 British Champions Series, sponsored by QIPCO, was the 10th edition of the horse racing series comprising 35 of the UK's top flat races.

The series was scheduled to begin with the 2,000 Guineas at Newmarket on 2 May, however the Guineas Festival was cancelled due to the COVID-19 pandemic, with the 2,000 and 1,000 Guineas races postponed until 6 and 7 June, respectively. The series began with the Coronation Cup at Newmarket (moved from Epsom) on 5 June. The Epsom Derby and Oaks, scheduled to be held in early June, were postponed until July. The Lockinge Stakes at Newbury was cancelled.

The series concluded with British Champions Day at Ascot on 17 October.

== Results ==
The series was split into five categories: Sprint, Mile, Middle Distance, Long Distance and Fillies & Mares. Each category included seven races.

=== Sprint ===
Race	Date	Distance	Course	1st	2nd	3rd
King's Stand Stakes	16 June	5 furlongs	Ascot	Battaash; Jim Crowley – Charles Hills	Equilateral; James Doyle – Charles Hills	Liberty Beach; Jason Hart – John Quinn
Commonwealth Cup	19 June	6 furlongs	Ascot	Golden Horde; Adam Kirby – Clive Cox	Kimari; Frankie Dettori – Wesley Ward	Ventura Rebel; Tony Hamilton – Richard Fahey
Diamond Jubilee Stakes	20 June	6 furlongs	Ascot	Hello Youmzain; Kevin Stott – Kevin Ryan	Dream Of Dreams; Ryan Moore – Michael Stoute	Sceptical; Frankie Dettori – Denis Hogan
July Cup	11 July	6 furlongs	Newmarket	Oxted; Cieren Fallon – Roger Teal	Sceptical; Frankie Dettori – Denis Hogan	Golden Horde; Adam Kirby – Clive Cox
Nunthorpe Stakes	21 August	5 furlongs	York	Battaash; Jim Crowley – Charles Hills	Que Amoro; Paul Mulrennan – Michael Dods	Moss Gill; Daniel Tudhope – James Bethell
Sprint Cup	5 September	6 furlongs	Haydock	Dream Of Dreams; Oisin Murphy – Michael Stoute	Glen Shiel; Hollie Doyle – Archie Watson	Golden Horde; Adam Kirby – Clive Cox
British Champions; Sprint Stakes	17 October	6 furlongs	Ascot	Glen Shiel; Hollie Doyle – Archie Watson	Brando; Tom Eaves – Kevin Ryan	One Master; P-C Boudot – William Haggas

=== Mile ===
Race	Date	Distance	Course	1st	2nd	3rd
~~Lockinge Stakes~~	Cancelled					
2,000 Guineas	6 June	1 mile	Newmarket	Kameko; Oisin Murphy – Andrew Balding	Wichita; Frankie Dettori – Aidan O'Brien	Pinatubo; William Buick – Charlie Appleby
Queen Anne Stakes	16 June	1 mile	Ascot	Circus Maximus; Ryan Moore – Aidan O'Brien	Terebellum; Frankie Dettori – John Gosden	Marie's Diamond; Joe Fanning – Mark Johnston
St James's Palace Stakes	20 June	1 mile	Ascot	Palace Pier; Frankie Dettori – John Gosden	Pinatubo; William Buick – Charlie Appleby	Wichita; Ryan Moore – Aidan O'Brien
Sussex Stakes	29 July	1 mile	Goodwood	Mohaather; Jim Crowley – Marcus Tregoning	Circus Maximus; Ryan Moore – Aidan O'Brien	Siskin; Colin Keane – Ger Lyons
Sun Chariot Stakes	3 October	1 mile	Newmarket	Nazeef; Jim Crowley – John Gosden	Half Light; William Buick – H-A Pantall	Cloak Of Spirits; Andrea Atzeni – Richard Hannon
Queen Elizabeth II Stakes	17 October	1 mile	Ascot	The Revenant; P-C Boudot – F-H Graffard	Roseman; Andrea Atzeni – Roger Varian	Palace Pier; Frankie Dettori – John Gosden

=== Middle Distance ===
Race	Date	Distance	Course	1st	2nd	3rd
Coronation Cup	5 June	1 mile 4 furlongs	Newmarket	Ghaiyyath; William Buick – Charlie Appleby	Anthony Van Dyck; Ryan Moore – Aidan O'Brien	Stradivarius; Frankie Dettori – John Gosden
Prince of Wales's Stakes	17 June	1 mile 2 furlongs	Ascot	Lord North; James Doyle – John Gosden	Addeybb; Tom Marquand – William Haggas	Barney Roy; William Buick – Charlie Appleby
Epsom Derby	4 July	1 mile 4 furlongs	Epsom	Serpentine; Emmet McNamara – Aidan O'Brien	Khalifa Sat; Tom Marquand – Andrew Balding	Amran Na Bhfiann; William Buick – Aidan O'Brien
Eclipse Stakes	5 July	1 mile 2 furlongs	Sandown	Ghaiyyath; William Buick – Charlie Appleby	Enable; Frankie Dettori – John Gosden	Japan; Ryan Moore – Aidan O'Brien
King George VI & Queen Elizabeth Stakes	25 July	1 mile 4 furlongs	Ascot	Enable; Frankie Dettori – John Gosden	Sovereign; William Buick – Aidan O'Brien	Japan; Ryan Moore – Aidan O'Brien
International Stakes	19 August	1 mile 2 1/2 furlongs	York	Ghaiyyath; William Buick – Charlie Appleby	Magical; Ryan Moore – Aidan O'Brien	Lord North; James Doyle – John Gosden
Champion Stakes	17 October	1 mile 2 furlongs	Ascot	Addeybb; Tom Marquand – William Haggas	Skalleti; P-C Boudot – Jerome Reynier	Magical; Ryan Moore – Aidan O'Brien

=== Long Distance ===
Race	Date	Distance	Course	1st	2nd	3rd
~~Yorkshire Cup~~	Cancelled					
Ascot Gold Cup	18 June	2 miles 4 furlongs	Ascot	Stradivarius; Frankie Dettori – John Gosden	Nayef Road; Ryan Moore – Mark Johnston	Cross Counter; James Doyle – Charlie Appleby
Goodwood Cup	28 July	2 miles	Goodwood	Stradivarius; Frankie Dettori – John Gosden	Nayef Road; Andrea Atzeni – Mark Johnston	Santiago; Ryan Moore – Aidan O'Brien
Lonsdale Cup	21 August	2 miles ½ furlong	York	Enbihaar; Jim Crowley – John Gosden	Stratum; Jason Watson – Willie Mullins	Nayef Road; Andrea Atzeni – Mark Johnston
Doncaster Cup	11 September	2 miles 2 furlongs	Doncaster	Spanish Mission; William Buick – Andrew Balding	Selino; Cieren Fallon – James Fanshawe	The Grand Visir; Jim Crowley – Ian Williams
St Leger Stakes	12 September	1 mile 6½ furlongs	Doncaster	Galileo Chrome; Tom Marquand – Joseph O'Brien	Berkshire Rocco; Andrea Atzeni – Andrew Balding	Pyledriver; Martin Dwyer – William Muir
British Champions; Long Distance Cup	17 October	2 miles	Ascot	Trueshan; Hollie Doyle – Alan King	Search For A Song; Oisin Murphy – Dermot Weld	Fujaira Prince; Andrea Atzeni – Roger Varian

=== Fillies & Mares ===
Race	Date	Distance	Course	1st	2nd	3rd
1,000 Guineas	7 June	1 mile	Newmarket	Love; Ryan Moore – Aidan O'Brien	Cloak Of Spirits; Andrea Atzeni – Richard Hannon	Quadrilateral; Jason Watson – Roger Charlton
Coronation Stakes	20 June	1 mile	Ascot	Alpine Star; Frankie Dettori – Jessica Harrington	Sharing; Oisin Murphy – Graham Motion	Quadrilateral; Jason Watson – Roger Charlton
Epsom Oaks	4 July	1 mile 4 furlongs	Epsom	Love; Ryan Moore – Aidan O'Brien	Ennistymon; Seamie Heffernan – Aidan O'Brien	Frankly Darling; Frankie Dettori – John Gosden
Falmouth Stakes	10 July	1 mile	Newmarket	Nazeef; Jim Crowley – John Gosden	Billesdon Brook; Sean Levey – Richard Hannon	Terebellum; Frankie Dettori – John Gosden
Nassau Stakes	30 July	1 mile 2 furlongs	Goodwood	Fancy Blue; Ryan Moore – Donnacha O'Brien	One Voice; Tom Marquand – Jessica Harrington	Nazeef; Jim Crowley – John Gosden
Yorkshire Oaks	20 August	1 mile 4 furlongs	York	Love; Ryan Moore – Aidan O'Brien	Alpinista; Ryan Tate – Mark Prescott	One Voice; Tom Marquand – Jessica Harrington
British Champions; Fillies & Mares Stakes	17 October	1 mile 4 furlongs	Ascot	Wonderful Tonight; William Buick – David Menuisier	Dame Malliot; Hollie Doyle – Ed Vaughan	Passion; Ryan Moore – Aidan O'Brien

== See also ==
- 2020 Epsom Derby
- 2020 King George VI and Queen Elizabeth Stakes
- 2020 Breeders' Cup Challenge series
