= 2020 Epsom Derby =

241st running of the Epsom Derby horse race

- Epsom Derby
- Location: Epsom Downs Racecourse
- Date: 4 July 2020
- Winning horse: Serpentine
- Starting price: 25/1
- Jockey: Emmet McNamara
- Trainer: Aidan O'Brien
- Conditions: Good

Epsom Derby 2020
1-2-3
Serpentine	Khalifa Sat	Amhran Na Bhfiann

Also Ran
4-5-6
Kameko	English King	Mogul
7-8-9
Russian Emperor	Vatican City	Gold Maze
10-11-12
Highland Chief	Pyledriver	Mohican Heights
13-14-15
Mythical	Max Vega	Emissary
16
Worthily	16 Ran	2m 34.43s

The 2020 Epsom Derby was the 241st annual running of the Derby horse race and took place at Epsom Downs Racecourse on 4 July 2020. The race was sponsored by Investec. It was originally scheduled to take place at on 6 June 2020, but was postponed until later in the season due to the COVID-19 pandemic and eventually rescheduled to take place on 4 July 2020.

The winner was the Coolmore Stud's chestnut colt Serpentine, ridden by Emmet McNamara and trained at Ballydoyle in Ireland by Aidan O'Brien, who saddled a record eighth Derby winner. McNamara was riding in the Derby for the first time and registered his first win in any race since October 2019.

== Race synopsis ==
=== Entries and race build-up ===
The initial entry for the 2020 Epsom Derby, announced in December 2018, consisted of 356 yearlings whose owners paid for each horse entered. The number of entries was an increase of 18 on the initial entry for the 2019 race, and included 12 horses from the Godolphin organisation and 75 from the Coolmore Stud. Khalid Abdullah entered 16 horses and five-time winning owner Aga Khan IV had 19 entries. Queen Elizabeth II entered 5 horses for the race.

Two wild card entries were planned, one for winning the Investec Derby "Wild Card" Conditions Race in September 2019 and the other for winning the 2020 Blue Riband Trial Stakes. Grand Rock, trained by William Haggas won the September 2019 race to claim the first wild card entry. The 2020 running of the Blue Riband Trial Stakes was cancelled because of the COVID-19 pandemic in the United Kingdom

The COVID outbreak lead to the Derby being postponed to 4 July 2020, although the course and distance remained unchanged. The restrictions imposed owing to the pandemic meant that many of the traditional trial races for the Derby were either cancelled or rearranged. For example, the Dante Stakes, usually a major trial, was postponed to July and run after the Derby, whereas the King Edward VII Stakes which is usually run after the Derby became a trial race for the Epsom classic. A further consideration for the rescheduled meeting was the need to run the race without spectators ("behind closed doors"). The course can be accessed by a number of public footpaths and bridleways and in order to hold the meeting behind closed doors at Epsom the local council had to approve an application for public access to be restricted. The original entries for the race were cancelled on 8 April 2020 with entry fees being refunded. The race attracted a total of seventeen entries when it was reopened on 28 June 2020. Of these seventeen, sixteen were declared on 2 July 2020, with the exception being the Aidan O'Brien-trained Armory.

== Race card ==
No	Draw	Horse	Weight (st–lb)	Jockey	Trainer	Owner
1	5	Amhran Na Bhfiann	9–0	William Buick	Aidan O'Brien (IRE)	Tabor, Smith, Magnier
2	4	Emissary	9–0	Jim Crowley	Hugo Palmer	Khalid Abdulla
3	1	English King	9–0	Frankie Dettori	Ed Walker	Bjorn Nielsen
4	16	Gold Maze	9–0	David Egan	Jessica Harrington (IRE)	Long Wait Partnership
5	13	Highland Chief	9–0	Ben Curtis	Paul & Oliver Cole	Fitri Hay
6	11	Kameko	9–0	Oisin Murphy	Andrew Balding	Qatar Racing
7	14	Khalifa Sat	9–0	Tom Marquand	Andrew Balding	Ahmad Al Shaikh
8	7	Max Vega	9–0	Harry Bentley	Ralph Beckett	Pickford Hill Partnership
9	2	Mogul	9–0	Ryan Moore	Aidan O'Brien (IRE)	Tabor, Smith, Magnier
10	15	Mohican Heights	9–0	Andrea Atzeni	David Simcock	Sun Bloodstock
11	10	Mythical	9–0	James Doyle	Aidan O'Brien (IRE)	Tabor, Smith, Magnier
12	3	Pyledriver	9–0	Martin Dwyer	William Muir	K & W Bloodstock & R W Devlin
13	6	Russian Emperor	9–0	Seamie Heffernan	Aidan O'Brien (IRE)	Laurie Macri, Mrs Magnier et al.
14	12	Serpentine	9–0	Emmet McNamara	Aidan O'Brien (IRE)	Tabor, Smith, Magnier
15	8	Vatican City	9–0	Padraig Beggy	Aidan O'Brien (IRE)	Tabor, Smith, Magnier
16	9	Worthily	9–0	Martin Harley	John Gosden	George W. Strawbridge Jr.

Trainers are based in Great Britain unless indicated.

== Full result ==
	Dist *	Horse	Jockey	Trainer	SP
1		Serpentine	Emmet McNamara	Aidan O'Brien (IRE)	25/1
2	5½	Khalifa Sat	Tom Marquand	Andrew Balding	50/1
3	½	Amhran Na Bhfiann	William Buick	Aidan O'Brien (IRE)	66/1
4	nse	Kameko	Oisin Murphy	Andrew Balding	5/2 fav
5	nk	English King	Frankie Dettori	Ed Walker	100/30
6	¾	Mogul	Ryan Moore	Aidan O'Brien (IRE)	7/1
7	1¼	Russian Emperor	Seamie Heffernan	Aidan O'Brien (IRE)	6/1
8	½	Vatican City	Padraig Beggy	Aidan O'Brien (IRE)	17/2
9	2¼	Gold Maze	David Egan	Jessica Harrington (IRE)	150/1
10	2¾	Highland Chief	Ben Curtis	Paul & Oliver Cole	20/1
11	½	Pyledriver	Martin Dwyer	William Muir	16/1
12	½	Mohican Heights	Andrea Atzeni	David Simcock	25/1
13	½	Mythical	James Doyle	Aidan O'Brien (IRE)	100/1
14	nk	Max Vega	Harry Bentley	Ralph Beckett	33/1
15	2¼	Emissary	Jim Crowley	Hugo Palmer	40/1
16	75	Worthily	Martin Harley	John Gosden	40/1

Winning time: 2 min 34.43 sec

* The distances between the horses are shown in lengths or shorter; nse = nose; hd = head.
† Trainers are based in Great Britain unless indicated.

== Form analysis ==
=== Two-year-old races ===
Notable runs by the future Derby participants as two-year-olds in 2019

- Gold Maze – 2nd in Beresford Stakes
- Highland Chief – 3rd in Chesham Stakes
- Kameko – 1st in Vertem Futurity Trophy, 2nd in Royal Lodge Stakes, 2nd in Solario Stakes
- Max Vega – 1st in Zetland Stakes
- Mogul – 1st in Juvenile Stakes
- Mohican Heights – 1st in Stonehenge Stakes
- Mythical – 3rd in Critérium de Saint-Cloud
- Pyledriver – 1st in Ascendant Stakes

=== Road to Epsom ===
Early-season appearances in 2020 and trial races prior to running in the Derby:

- Emissary – 2nd in Cocked Hat Stakes
- English King – 1st in Lingfield Derby Trial
- Gold Maze – 2nd in Gallinule Stakes
- Kameko – 1st in 2000 Guineas
- Khalifa Sat – 1st in Cocked Hat Stakes
- Mohican Heights – 3rd in King Edward VII Stakes
- Pyledriver – 1st in King Edward VII Stakes, 2nd in Sandown Classic Trial
- Russian Emperor – 1st in Hampton Court Stakes, 2nd in Derrinstown Stud Derby Trial
- Vatican City – 2nd in Irish 2000 Guineas

=== Subsequent Group 1 wins ===
Group 1 / Grade I victories after running in the Derby:

- Mogul – Grand Prix de Paris (2020), Hong Kong Vase (2020)
- Pyledriver – Coronation Cup (2021), King George VI and Queen Elizabeth Stakes (2022)
- Russian Emperor – Hong Kong Gold Cup (2022), Standard Chartered Champions and Chater Cup (2022, 2023), H.H. The Amir Trophy (2023)

== See also ==
- 2020 British Champions Series
