= Pyledriver =

British Thoroughbred racehorse

- Racing silks of Knox & Wells Ltd
- Sire: Harbour Watch
- Grandsire: Acclamation
- Dam: La Pyle
- Damsire: Le Havre
- Sex: Colt
- Foaled: 14 March 2017
- Country: United Kingdom
- Colour: Bay
- Breeder: Knox & Wells Limited & Roger Devlin
- Owner: Knox & Wells Ltd & Roger Devlin; La Pyle Partnership
- Trainer: William Muir & Chris Grassick
- Record: 19 8-4-1
- Earnings: £1,848,185

Major wins
- Ascendant Stakes (2019); King Edward VII Stakes (2020); Great Voltigeur Stakes (2020); Coronation Cup (2021); Churchill Stakes (2021); King George VI and Queen Elizabeth Stakes (2022); Hardwicke Stakes (2023)

Pyledriver (foaled 14 March 2017) is a retired British Thoroughbred racehorse. After showing promise as a two-year-old in 2019, when he won two of four races including the Listed Ascendant Stakes, he improved in the following year to become a top-class middle-distance performer, winning the King Edward VII Stakes and the Great Voltigeur Stakes as well as finishing third in the St Leger. In 2021 he recorded his first Group 1 victory in the Coronation Cup. In 2022 he registered an upset victory the King George VI and Queen Elizabeth Stakes. He was ridden in fourteen of his first fifteen starts by Martin Dwyer.

== Background ==
Pyledriver is a brown horse with a white blaze and three white socks, bred in England by Roger Devlin in partnership with Knox & Wells Ltd, a company owned by the brothers Guy and Hugh Leach. As a foal in December 2017 he was consigned to the Tattersalls sales but failed to reach his reserve price of 10,000 guineas. The colt was sent into training with William Muir at the Linkslade stable Lambourn in Berkshire.

He was from the fourth crop of foals sired by Harbour Watch, who was undefeated in three starts including the Richmond Stakes. Harbour Watch's other offspring have included Waikuku (Stewards' Cup), Baron Samedi (Belmont Gold Cup Stakes), and Tis Marvellous (Prix Robert Papin). Pyledriver's dam La Pyle, showed modest racing ability, winning two minor races in France before competing without success over hurdles in Britain. She was a half-sister to the Grand Prix de Paris winner Mount Ormel and, as a descendant of the broodmare Licata, a distant relative of Akiyda and Acamas.

== Racing career ==
=== 2019: two-year-old season ===
Pyledriver made his debut in a novice race over seven furlongs on firm ground at Salisbury Racecourse on 13 July. He started as a 50/1 outsider but belied his odds as he produced a strong late run to gain the advantage in the closing stages and win "comfortably" by three quarters of a length from the favourite Great Ambassador. The colt was stepped up in class for the Listed Washington Singer Stakes on soft ground over the same trip at Newbury Racecourse on 17 August and came home fourth of the five runners behind the Mark Johnston-trained Thunderous, beaten three and a half lengths by the winner. Three weeks later Pyledriver was partnered by P. J. McDonald when he was moved up to one mile for the Listed Ascendant Stakes at Haydock Park and started at odds of 14/1 in an eight-runner field. After tracking the leaders he took the lead two furlongs from the finish and "stayed on well" to win by one and a quarter lengths. On his final appearance of the season the colt ran poorly in the Group 2 Royal Lodge Stakes at Ascot Racecourse, finishing tailed-off last of the eight runners. Muir explained that Pyledriver had lost some of his strength having grown throughout the summer.

=== 2020: three-year-old season ===
The flat racing season in Great Britain was disrupted by the COVID-19 pandemic with racing being suspended in spring and many major races being rescheduled. Pyledriver began his season by starting a 40/1 outsider for the Classic Trial Stakes which was run behind closed doors on polytrack at Kempton Park Racecourse on 3 June. After being restrained in the early stages he stayed on well in the straight to take second place behind Berlin Tango. The Group 2 King Edward VII Stakes over one and a half miles at Royal Ascot usually takes place two weeks or so after the Epsom Derby but in 2020 the Epsom classic was postponed by a month, meaning that the Ascot race on 16 June became a major Derby trial. With Dwyer in the saddle Pyledriver went off the 18/1 fifth choice in a six-runner field which was headed by the Aidan O'Brien-trained Mogul and also included the Stonehenge Stakes winner Mohican Heights. Pyledriver was always traveling well, overtook the front-running Sound of Cannons in the straight and stayed on well to win by two lengths from Arthur's Kingdom. After the race Muir said "he was just weak as a kitten last year. I was quite confident that this horse would run a massive race as he had really come to himself over the past three or four days... he started to spark and he was bouncing." Going on to discuss the colt's prospects of contesting the Epsom Derby he added "I will monitor the horse... We have three weeks and if he does well we can go there".

Pyledriver started at odds of 16/1 for the 241st running of the Derby on 4 July and finished eleventh of the sixteen runners behind Serpentine, having never looked likely to win after being hampered in the early stages. On 19 August at York Racecourse the colt contested the Group 2 Great Voltigeur Stakes went off the 10/1 fifth choice in an eight-runner field, with those preferred in the betting being Mogul, Darain, Roberto Escobarr and Berkshire Rocco. Pyledriver raced towards the rear before making "rapid progress" in the straight, taking the lead two furlongs out, and winning "comfortably" by three and a half lengths from Highland Chief. Muir commented "I knew the horse had got stronger since Epsom... I could only see him getting stronger next year and he looks a great horse for the future," while Dwyer said "Pyledriver won that like a Group 1 horse and I'm pleased he's back in business. Epsom was a write-off as he was interfered with after a furlong and never ran his race."

In the 244th running of the St Leger over fourteen and a half furlongs at Doncaster Racecourse on 12 September and Pyledriver started the 9/2 fourth choice of the eleven runners. He came from the rear of the field to move into contention in the straight and despite swerving to the left in the closing stages he kept on well to finish third behind Galileo Chrome and Berkshire Rocco. For his final run of the year he was dropped back in distance and matched against older horses in the Champion Stakes over ten furlongs at Ascot on 17 October when he came home seventh of the ten runners behind the six-year-old gelding Addeybb.

In the 2020 World's Best Racehorse Rankings, Pyledriver was rated the fifty-seventh best racehorse in the world.

=== 2021: four-year-old season ===
For the 2021 season Pyledriver was trained by Muir in partnership with Chris Grassick. The colt began his third campaign on 1 May at Newmarket Racecourse when he finished second to Sir Ron Priestley in the Group 2 Jockey Club Stakes. Dwyer reported that the horse had "ducked both ways away from the whip in the closing stages". The colt then returned to Group 1 class and started at 8/1 for the Coronation Cup over one and a half miles at Epsom on 4 June. The Aston Park Stakes winner Al Aasy started favourite while the other four runners were Japan, Mogul, Highland Chief and the filly Albaflora (Buckhounds Stakes). Pyledriver started well, settled in second place behind Highland Chief, went to the front at half way and maintained his lead into the last quarter mile. A furlong out he was challenged and overtaken by Al Aasy but rallied "gamely" to regain the advantage in the final strides and win by a neck. After the race Dwyer said "It was a tremendous race to ride in and I would imagine it would be the same to watch; they're two very tough horses. I don't know what came over me but I was a bit emotional. It's getting harder and harder as all the good horses are with the biggest trainers, and I think that's why people like seeing horses like him and owners who are sporting getting the rewards as they're the underdogs."

After a five-month break, Pyledriver returned to the racecourse on 13 November 2021 to win the Churchill Stakes on the all-weather course at Lingfield. He then made his first trip abroad to run in the Hong Kong Vase at Sha Tin Racecourse, Hong Kong, on 12 December 2021. He was beaten one length into second place by the odds-on favourite Glory Vase.

=== 2022: five-year-old season ===
On 26 February 2022 Pyledriver started 2/1 joint favourite for the Group 3 Turf Cup at the King Abdulaziz Racetrack in Riyadh in Saudi Arabia. Hampered by a faller in the closing stages, he came 11th of fourteen runners. It was the last time he was ridden by Dwyer, who had ridden him in all but one of his previous fourteen starts. Dwyer was injured in March 2022 and retired from race-riding four months later. In the Dubai Sheema Classic in March, Pyledriver was ridden by Frankie Dettori and was beaten a length into fourth place by Shahryar.

Pyledriver raced twice during the summer in Britain. At Epsom on 3 June, again ridden by Dettori and starting as 2/1 favourite, he attempted to win the Coronation Cup for the second time, only to be beaten just over four lengths into second place by Hukum. He then started as 18/1 outsider in a field of six in the King George VI and Queen Elizabeth Stakes at Ascot in July, ridden by McDonald, who had ridden him once before as a two-year-old. Passing the pace-setting Westover and Broome as they turned for home, Pyledriver went on to win by nearly three lengths from Torquator Tasso. A minor soft-tissue injury in training then put paid to plans to race Pyledriver in the Prix de l'Arc de Triomphe in October, and he did not race again until June 2023.

=== 2023: six-year-old season and retirement ===
Pyledriver's first race of the season, after an eleven-month break, was the Group 2 Hardwicke Stakes at Royal Ascot on 24 June 2023, when he survived a stewards' inquiry to win the race by just over a length. The following month he finished fifth behind Hukum in the King George VI and Queen Elizabeth Stakes. In both races he was ridden by McDonald. There were again plans to enter him in the Prix de l'Arc de Triomphe but on 5 September 2023 Muir announced that he had problems with a suspensory ligament and was being retired.

In October 2023 it was announced that Pyledriver would be standing as a National Hunt stallion at The Beeches Stud in Ireland, part of the Coolmore breeding operation. His trainer summed up his racing career: ""Pyledriver is the best horse I’ve ever had anything to do with and gave us so many fantastic days. From day one he never let us down; brilliant temperament, went on any ground, clean winded and super sound." A spokesman from Coolmore described his potential as a sire: "Pyledriver is a fine big horse, with plenty of quality about him, a great colour and a very good walk. He was a terrific racehorse and is a complete outcross for the majority of National Hunt mares here in Ireland." In late December it was revealed that his fee for 2024 would be €4,000.

== Pedigree ==
Pedigree of Pyledriver (GB), brown colt 2017
Sire Harbour Watch (IRE) 2009	Acclamation (GB); 1999	Royal Applause	Waajib (IRE)
Sire Harbour Watch (IRE) 2009	Acclamation (GB); 1999	Royal Applause	Flying Melody (IRE)
Sire Harbour Watch (IRE) 2009	Acclamation (GB); 1999	Princess Athena (IRE)	Ahonoora (GB)
Sire Harbour Watch (IRE) 2009	Acclamation (GB); 1999	Princess Athena (IRE)	Shopping Wise
Sire Harbour Watch (IRE) 2009	Gorband (USA); 1999	Woodman	Mr Prospector
Sire Harbour Watch (IRE) 2009	Gorband (USA); 1999	Woodman	Playmate
Sire Harbour Watch (IRE) 2009	Gorband (USA); 1999	Sheroog	Shareef Dancer
Sire Harbour Watch (IRE) 2009	Gorband (USA); 1999	Sheroog	Fall Aspen
Dam La Pyle (FR) 2011	Le Havre (IRE); 2006	Noverre (USA)	Rahy
Dam La Pyle (FR) 2011	Le Havre (IRE); 2006	Noverre (USA)	Danseur Fabuleux
Dam La Pyle (FR) 2011	Le Havre (IRE); 2006	Marie Rheinberg (GER)	Surako
Dam La Pyle (FR) 2011	Le Havre (IRE); 2006	Marie Rheinberg (GER)	Marie d'Argonne (FR)
Dam La Pyle (FR) 2011	Lidana (IRE); 2005	King's Best (USA)	Kingmambo
Dam La Pyle (FR) 2011	Lidana (IRE); 2005	King's Best (USA)	Allegretta (GB)
Dam La Pyle (FR) 2011	Lidana (IRE); 2005	Lidakiya	Kahyasi
Dam La Pyle (FR) 2011	Lidana (IRE); 2005	Lidakiya	Lilissa (Family: 13-c)
