= Rod Bonella =

Australian long-distance runner and horse trainer

Personal information
- Born: 19 June 1937
- Died: 2 April 2000 (aged 62)
- Occupation: Horse trainer
- Years active: 1950s–1967 (Running); 1957–? (Horse training)

Sport
- Sport: Athletics

Achievements and titles
- Commonwealth finals: 1962
Medal record
Marathon
Commonwealth Games
Bronze medal – third place	1962 Perth	Marathon

Rodney Fairfax Bonella (19 June 1937 – 2 April 2000) was an Australian long-distance runner and horse trainer. He came third in the marathon event at the 1962 British Empire and Commonwealth Games.

== Running career ==
Bonella attended Scotch College, Melbourne, where he ran the mile and half-mile events, and was also a cross-country runner. He was part of the school's 4 x 880 yard relay team that set an Associated Public Schools of Victoria (APS) record. In the 1960s, Bonella was trained by Emil Zátopek, and trained alongside fellow Australian athletes Ron Clarke, Trevor Vincent and Tony Cook. In 1962, Bonella came second in the Australian National Marathon Championships, behind Keith Ollerenshaw. He was competing for Victoria state.

Bonella was selected for the marathon event at the 1962 British Empire and Commonwealth Games in Perth, Australia. He came third in the race, finishing in a time of 2:24:07. Bonella fell behind the leading two runners with 5 miles (8.0 km) to go in the race, and suffered with dehydration until the end of the race. In 1963, he competed in local 3000 metres steeplechase, one mile, three mile and six miles events. In 1965, Bonella won an APS Old Boys' cross-country event.

Bonella retired from running in 1967, to focus on his horse training career.

== Horse training career ==
Bonella started training horses in 1957, when he imported the horse Caynham from the United Kingdom. In 1965, Bonella bought Amourrou, a horse which had won the 1965 Churchill Stakes. Amourrou was the grandson of legendary American horse Man o' War. Later in the year, Amourrou produced a foal that was the first horse born in Australia to be directly descended from Man o' War. In the 1970s, Bonella earned a licence to become a horse owner and trainer. From 1978 to 1984, Bonella took a break from horse racing, after one of his winning horses, Royal Amour, was badly injured. Rooster Hall, a horse trained by Bonella, won a 1994 race at Sandown Racecourse.

Bonella's daughter Louise is also a horse trainer.

== Death ==
Bonella died of cancer on 2 April 2000, at the age of 62.
