= 2020 Breeders' Cup Challenge series =

Series of horse races

The 2020 Breeders' Cup Challenge series consists of horse races from around the world that provide the respective winners with an automatic "Win and You're In" Berth in the 2020 Breeders' Cup, to be held on November 6 and 7. Races are chosen by the Breeders' Cup organization and include key races in the various Breeders' Cup divisions. The Breeders' Cup organization pays the Breeders' Cup entry fee for the challenge race winners, provided they had been nominated as foals.

== Summary ==
The selected races vary somewhat from year to year as the Breeders' Cup attempts to attract the best horses in each division. The Breeders' Cup organization normally makes an announcement in April about the races that it will add or remove from the previous year's schedule for the new year. Because of the disruption to the racing schedule caused by the COVID-19 pandemic, the Breeders' Cup organization instead made several adjustments to the normal series throughout 2020.

The 2019 Breeders' Cup Challenge series consisted of 86 races from across 11 countries. New races for 2020 include the Victoria Mile at Tokyo Racecourse (Filly & Mare Turf), Carter Handicap at Belmont Park (Sprint), Alabama Stakes at Saratoga (Distaff) and the Preakness Stakes at Pimlico (Classic).

The following races were removed from the 2020 series: Gran Premio Criadores, Gran Premio Club Hipico Falabella, Gran Premio Pamplona, Princess Rooney Handicap, John A. Nerud, Beverly D., Arlington Million, Jockey Club Derby, Cotillion and Sprinters Stakes.

On October 28, a total of 201 pre-entries were taken for the Breeders' Cup races, of which 48 horses were automatic qualifiers through the Challenge series races.

Five winners from the challenge series went on to win at the 2020 Breeders' Cup:

- Aunt Pearl won the Juvenile Fillies Turf after qualifying in the Jessamine
- Essential Quality won the Juvenile after taking the Breeders' Futurity
- Glass Slippers won the Turf Sprint after earning a berth in the Flying Five
- Tarnawa won the Turf after qualifying for the Filly & Mare Turf in the Prix de l'Opéra
- Authentic won the Classic after qualifying in the Haskell

== Challenge Series races ==
The following table shows the Breeders' Cup Challenge races for 2020 and the respective winners. The status column shows if the winner was entered at the Breeders' Cup, and if so, whether they finished in the top three.

Month	Race	Track	Location	Division	Winner	Status
December	Gran Premio Internacional Carlos Pellegrini	San Isidro	Argentina	Breeders' Cup Turf	Nao Da Mais (BRZ)	bypass
January	Paddock Stakes	Kenilworth	South Africa	Breeders' Cup Filly & Mare Turf	Queen Supreme (IRE)	bypass
January	Queen's Plate	Kenilworth	South Africa	Breeders' Cup Mile	Vardy (SAF)	bypass
February	February Stakes	Tokyo	Japan	Breeders' Cup Classic	Mozu Ascot (JPN)	bypass
May	Victoria Mile	Tokyo Racecourse	Japan	Breeders' Cup Filly & Mare Turf	Almond Eye (JPN)	bypass
May	Shoemaker Mile	Santa Anita	California	Breeders' Cup Mile	Raging Bull (FR)	entered
June	Carter Handicap	Belmont Park	New York	Breeders' Cup Sprint	Vekoma	scratched
June	Yasuda Kinen	Tokyo	Japan	Breeders' Cup Mile	Gran Alegria (JPN)	bypass
June	Ogden Phipps Stakes	Belmont Park	New York	Breeders' Cup Distaff	She's a Julie	retired
June	Queen Anne Stakes	Royal Ascot	England	Breeders' Cup Mile	Circus Maximus (Ire)	second
June	Prince of Wales's Stakes	Royal Ascot	England	Breeders' Cup Turf	Lord North (IRE)	entered
June	Norfolk Stakes	Royal Ascot	England	Breeders' Cup Juvenile Turf Sprint	The Lir Jet	entered in Juvenile Turf
June	Diamond Jubilee Stakes	Royal Ascot	England	Breeders' Cup Turf Sprint	Hello Youmzain (FR)	retired
June	Jaipur Invitational	Belmont Park	New York	Breeders' Cup Turf Sprint	Oleksandra (AUS)	entered
June	Fleur de Lis Handicap	Churchill Downs	Kentucky	Breeders' Cup Distaff	Midnight Bisou	retired
June	Stephen Foster Handicap	Churchill Downs	Kentucky	Breeders' Cup Classic	Tom's d'Etat	entered
June	Takarazuka Kinen	Hanshin	Japan	Breeders' Cup Turf	Chrono Genesis (JPN)	bypass
July	Metropolitan Handicap	Belmont Park	New York	Breeders' Cup Dirt Mile	Vekoma	scratched from the Sprint
July	Haskell Invitational	Monmouth	New Jersey	Breeders' Cup Classic	Authentic	entered
July	King George VI and Queen Elizabeth Stakes	Ascot	England	Breeders' Cup Turf	Enable (GB)	retired
July	Sussex Stakes	Goodwood	England	Breeders' Cup Mile	Mohaather (GB)	retired
August	Personal Ensign Stakes	Saratoga	New York	Breeders' Cup Distaff	Vexatious	injured
August	Whitney Handicap	Saratoga	New York	Breeders' Cup Classic	Improbable	second
August	Bing Crosby Handicap	Del Mar	California	Breeders' Cup Sprint	Collusion Illusion	entered
August	Clement L. Hirsch Stakes	Del Mar	California	Breeders' Cup Distaff	Fighting Mad	bypass
August	Ballerina Stakes	Saratoga	New York	Breeders' Cup Filly & Mare Sprint	Serengeti Empress	second
August	Alabama Stakes	Saratoga	New York	Breeders' Cup Distaff	Swiss Skydiver	entered
August	Prix Jacques Le Marois	Deauville	France	Breeders' Cup Mile	Palace Pier	bypass
August	Juddmonte International	York	England	Breeders' Cup Classic	Ghaiyyath (IRE)	retired
August	Yorkshire Oaks	York	England	Breeders' Cup Filly & Mare Turf	Love (IRE)	bypass
August	Nunthorpe Stakes	York	England	Breeders' Cup Turf Sprint	Battaash (IRE)	bypass
August	Del Mar Handicap	Del Mar	California	Breeders' Cup Turf	Red King	entered
August	Fourstardave Handicap	Saratoga	New York	Breeders' Cup Mile	Halladay	entered
August	Pacific Classic	Del Mar	California	Breeders' Cup Classic	Maximum Security	entered
August	Prix Morny	Deauville	France	Breeders' Cup Juvenile Turf Sprint	Campanelle	entered Juvenile Fillies Turf
August	Sword Dancer	Saratoga	New York	Breeders' Cup Turf	Channel Maker	third
August	Pat O'Brien Stakes	Del Mar	California	Breeders' Cup Dirt Mile	C Z Rocket	second
September	Pocahontas Stakes	Churchill Downs	Kentucky	Breeders' Cup Juvenile Fillies	Girl Daddy	third
September	Iroquois Stakes	Churchill Downs	Kentucky	Breeders' Cup Juvenile	Sittin on Go	entered
September	Juvenile Stakes	Leopardstown	Ireland	Breeders' Cup Juvenile Turf	Cadillac	entered
September	Matron Stakes	Leopardstown	Ireland	Breeders' Cup Filly & Mare Turf	Champers Elysees	bypass
September	Irish Champion Stakes	Leopardstown	Ireland	Breeders' Cup Turf	Magical	second
September	Turf Sprint	Kentucky Downs	Kentucky	Breeders' Cup Turf Sprint	Imprimis	entered
September	Moyglare Stud Stakes	Curragh	Ireland	Breeders' Cup Juvenile Fillies Turf	Shale	bypass
September	Flying Five Stakes	Curragh	Ireland	Breeders' Cup Turf Sprint	Glass Slippers	won
September	Woodbine Mile	Woodbine	Canada	Breeders' Cup Mile	Starship Jubilee	entered in the Filly & Mare Turf
September	Natalma Stakes	Woodbine	Canada	Breeders' Cup Juvenile Fillies Turf	Lady Speightspeare	injured
September	Summer Stakes	Woodbine	Canada	Breeders' Cup Juvenile Turf	Gretzky the Great	entered
September	Rockfel Stakes	Newmarket	England	Breeders' Cup Juvenile Fillies Turf	Isabella Giles	bypass
September	Royal Lodge Stakes	Newmarket	England	Breeders' Cup Juvenile Turf	New Mandate	entered
September	Vosburgh Stakes	Belmont Park	New York	Breeders' Cup Sprint	Firenze Fire	third
September	Speakeasy Stakes	Santa Anita	California	Breeders' Cup Juvenile Turf Sprint	Amanzi Yimpilo (IRE)	scratched
September	Rodeo Drive Stakes	Santa Anita	California	Breeders' Cup Filly & Mare Turf	Mucho Unusual	entered
September	American Pharoah Stakes	Santa Anita	California	Breeders' Cup Juvenile	Get Her Number	injured
September	Chandelier Stakes	Santa Anita	California	Breeders' Cup Juvenile Fillies	Princess Noor	entered
September	Awesome Again Stakes	Santa Anita	California	Breeders' Cup Classic	Improbable	second
September	Grande Premio Brasi	Hipódromo da Gávea	Brazil	Breeders' Cup Turf	Pimper's Paradise (BRZ)	bypass
September	Santa Anita Sprint Championship	Santa Anita	California	Breeders' Cup Sprint	C Z Rocket	second
September	Zenyatta Stakes	Santa Anita	California	Breeders' Cup Distaff	Harvest Moon	entered
October	Phoenix Stakes	Keeneland	Kentucky	Breeders' Cup Sprint	Diamond Oops	entered
October	Alcibiades Stakes	Keeneland	Kentucky	Breeders' Cup Juvenile Fillies	Simply Ravishing	entered
October	Preakness Stakes	Pimlico Race Course	Maryland	Breeders' Cup Classic	Swiss Skydiver	entered in Distaff
October	First Lady Stakes	Keeneland	Kentucky	Breeders' Cup Filly & Mare Turf	Uni	entered in Mile
October	Thoroughbred Club of America Stakes	Keeneland	Kentucky	Breeders' Cup Filly & Mare Sprint	Inthemidstofbiz	scratched
October	Shadwell Turf Mile Stakes	Keeneland	Kentucky	Breeders' Cup Mile	Ivar	entered
October	Breeders' Futurity Stakes	Keeneland	Kentucky	Breeders' Cup Juvenile	Essential Quality	entered
October	Belmont Derby	Belmont Park	New York	Breeders' Cup Turf	Gufo	bypass
October	Prix de l'Abbaye de Longchamp	Longchamp	France	Breeders' Cup Turf Sprint	Wooded	bypass
October	Prix de l'Opéra	Longchamp	France	Breeders' Cup Filly & Mare Turf	Tarnawa	won the Turf
October	Prix Jean-Luc Lagardère	Longchamp	France	Breeders' Cup Juvenile Turf	Sealiway	entered
October	Prix Marcel Boussac	Longchamp	France	Breeders' Cup Juvenile Fillies Turf	Tiger Tanaka	bypass
October	Prix de l'Arc de Triomphe	Longchamp	France	Breeders' Cup Turf	Sottsass	retired
October	Indian Summer Stakes	Keeneland	Kentucky	Breeders' Cup Juvenile Turf Sprint	Bodenheimer	entered
October	Bourbon Stakes	Keeneland	Kentucky	Breeders' Cup Juvenile Turf	Mutasaabeq	entered
October	Spinster Stakes	Keeneland	Kentucky	Breeders' Cup Distaff	Valiance	second
October	Jessamine Stakes	Keeneland	Kentucky	Breeders' Cup Juvenile Fillies Turf	Aunt Pearl (IRE)	won
October	Belmont Futurity	Belmont Park	New York	Breeders' Cup Juvenile Turf Sprint	Second of July	entered
October	Frizette Stakes	Belmont Park	New York	Breeders' Cup Juvenile Fillies	Dayoutoftheoffice	second
October	Flower Bowl	Belmont Park	New York	Breeders' Cup Filly & Mare Turf	Civil Union	entered
October	Champagne Stakes	Belmont Park	New York	Breeders' Cup Juvenile	Jackie's Warrior	entered
September	Jockey Club Gold Cup	Belmont Park	New York	Breeders' Cup Classic	Happy Saver	bypass

== Television coverage ==
Most of the Challenge Series races were televised, either by NBC, NBC Sports, TVG or Fox Sports.

== See also ==
- 2020 British Champions Series
