= Churchill Stakes =

Flat horse race in Britain

- Class: Listed
- Location: Southwell Racecourse; Southwell, England
- Race type: Flat / Thoroughbred
- Sponsor: Midnite
- Website: Southwell

Race information
- Distance: 1m 3f 23y (2,234 metres)
- Surface: Tapeta
- Track: Left-handed
- Qualification: Three-years-old and up
- Weight: 9 st 0 lb (3yo); 9 st 4 lb (4yo+); Allowances; 5 lb for fillies Penalties; 7 lb for G1 or G2 winners* 5 lb for G3 winners* 3 lb for Listed winners* * after 31 March
- Purse: £50,000 (2025); 1st: £28,355

Churchill Stakes
2023
Blue Trail	Tyrrhenian Sea	Forest Of Dean

Previous years
2022
Missed The Cut	Algiers	Harrovian
2021
Pyledriver	Harrovian	Felix

2020-2011
2020
Dubai Warrior	Sinjaari	Palavecino
2019
Crossed Baton	Kuwait Currency	Pactolus
2018
Master The World	Big Country	Addeybb
2017
Master The World	Victory Bond	Mia Tesoro
2016
Team Talk	Educate	Master The World
2015
Let's Go	Grendisar	Metropol
2014
Battalion	Educate	Energia Fox
2013
Prince Alzain	Bancnuanaheireann	Uramazin
2012
Farraaj	Genzy	Circumvent
2011
Hunter's Light	Circumvent	Suits Me

2010-2000
2010
Nideeb	Summit Surge	Suits Me
2009
Tranquil Tiger	Presvis	Suits Me
2008
Yahrab	Baharah	Harvest Queen
2007
Grand Passion	Gentleman's Deal	Millville
2006
Nayyir	Blue Bajan	Charlie Cool
2005
Kew Green	Boule d'Or	Compton Bolter
2004
Grand Passion	Compton Bolter	Longridge
2003
Compton Bolter	Grand Passion	Windy Britain
2002
Beauchamp Pilot	Kirovski	Lagudin
2001
Compton Bolter	Reef Diver	Whaleef
2000
Compton Bolter	Crimson Tide	Golconda

The Churchill Stakes is a Listed flat horse race in Great Britain open to horses aged three years or older. It is run over a distance of 1 mile, 3 furlongs and 23 yards (2,234 metres). From 2000 to 2023 it was run over 1 mile and 2 furlongs at Lingfield Park in November. In 2024 the race was run at Newcastle and from 2025 it will move to Southwell and increased to its present distance.

== Records ==
Most successful horse since 2000:

- Compton Bolter (2000, 2001, 2003)

Leading jockey since 2000 (3 wins):

- Sean Levey – Team Talk (2016), Master the World (2017, 2018)

Leading trainer since 2000 (6 wins):

- Gerard Butler – Compton Bolter (2000, 2001, 2003), Beauchamp Pilot (2002), Nayyir (2006), Prince Alzain (2013)

== Winners ==
Year	Winner	Age	Jockey	Trainer	Time
2000	Compton Bolter	3	Frankie Dettori	Gerard Butler	2:02.60
2001	Compton Bolter	4	Jamie Spencer	Gerard Butler	2:04.70
2002	Beauchamp Pilot	4	Eddie Ahern	Gerard Butler	2:05.25
2003	Compton Bolter	6	Martin Dwyer	Gerard Butler	2:06.83
2004	Grand Passion	4	John Egan	Geoff Wragg	2:04.71
2005	Kew Green	7	Dane O'Neill	Paul Webber	2:05.21
2006	Nayyir	8	Eddie Ahern	Gerard Butler	2:03.90
2007	Grand Passion	7	Steve Drowne	Geoff Wragg	2:04.53
2008	Yahrab	3	Jamie Spencer	Clive Brittain	2:05.81
2009	Tranquil Tiger	5	Tom Queally	Henry Cecil	2:04.67
2010	Nideeb	3	Chris Catlin	Clive Brittain	2:03.90
2011	Hunter's Light	3	William Buick	Saeed bin Suroor	2:03.34
2012	Farraaj	3	Andrea Atzeni	Roger Varian	2:02.37
2013	Prince Alzain	4	Oisin Murphy	Gerard Butler	2:02.33
2014	Battalion	4	Tom Queally	William Haggas	2:05.21
2015	Let's Go	3	James Doyle	Saeed bin Suroor	2:03.69
2016	Team Talk	3	Sean Levey	Saeed bin Suroor	2:02.56
2017	Master the World	6	Sean Levey	David Elsworth	2:01.14
2018	Master the World	7	Sean Levey	David Elsworth	2:01.23
2019	Crossed Baton	4	Frankie Dettori	John Gosden	2:45.13
2020	Dubai Warrior	4	Robert Havlin	John Gosden	2:03.37
2021	Pyledriver	4	Martin Dwyer	William Muir & Chris Grassick	2:04.74
2022	Missed The Cut	3	Jim Crowley	George Boughey	2:00.29
2023	Blue Trail	4	James Doyle	Charlie Appleby	2:04.05
2024	The Foxes	4	Oisin Murphy	Andrew Balding	2:08.18
2025	Dubai Honour	7	Cieren Fallon	William Haggas	2:20.52

== See also ==
- Horse racing in Great Britain
- List of British flat horse races
