= Continuous (horse) =

Irish thoroughbred racehorse

- Breed: Thoroughbred
- Sire: Heart's Cry
- Grandsire: Sunday Silence
- Dam: Fluff
- Damsire: Galileo
- Sex: Stallion
- Foaled: 5 March 2020 (age 6); Niikappu, Hokkaido, Japan
- Country: Ireland
- Color: Bay
- Breeder: Paca Paca Farm
- Owner: D Smith, Mrs J Magnier, M Tabor, Westerberg
- Trainer: Aidan O'Brien
- Record: 21:5-1-15

Major wins
- St. Leger Stakes (2023); Great Voltigeur Stakes (2023); Prix Thomas Bryon (2022); Royal Whip Stakes (2024)

Continuous (foaled 5 March 2020) is a retired thoroughbred racehorse bred in Japan and trained in Ireland. He is the winner of the 2023 St Leger Stakes and Great Voltigeur Stakes, as well as the 2022 Prix Thomas Bryon.

== Racing career ==
=== Background ===
Continuous' dam, Fluff, was sent to Japan by people of the Coolmore Stud to have her covered by Deep Impact. They were, however, unsuccessful, and instead was covered by another horse with similar pedigree, Heart's Cry. The horse was born in a Japanese farm called Paca Paca Farm in Niikappu, Hokkaido .

=== 2022: Two-year old season ===
Continuous debuted at a maiden race on August 20 held at Curragh Racecourse ridden by Ryan Moore, where he ran and won the race.

Later on, the horse ran in the Group 3 Prix Thomas Bryon and won, marking his first group race win.

=== 2023: Three-year old season ===
Continuous started the season off with the G2 Dante Stakes on 18 May and finished at third place in a dead heat.

On 4 June, Continuous entered the Prix du Jockey Club as the 4th most favoured to win. He ran third place for most of the race but lost momentum in the straight and finished eighth behind Ace Impact.

At the King Edward VII Stakes on 23 June, the horse contested the lead as the field entered the final straight, but was quickly overtaken by King of Steel and finished 2nd behind King of Steel by 3 and a half lengths.

On 23 August at the Great Voltigeur Stakes, the horse ran at the back of the field before pushing up halfway through the straight and ultimately taking the lead. The horse won this race, which became his second group race victory, by 3 and a 3/4 lengths.

On 16 September, Continuous ran in the Group 1 St Leger Stakes as the second most favourite. As the race began, Moore opted to settle in and place the horse in the rear of the field; keeping a close eye on Arrest who was ahead of them as they came past the halfway point, running third from last. Continuous was almost blocked by Denmark and Gregory who was running ahead, but as Denmark lost momentum Continuous started to push ahead. Quickly overtaking Gregory, Continuous took the lead and ran ahead, finishing the race in first place with a 2 and 3-quarter length margin over runner-up Arrest.

Continuous was then entered in the Prix de l'Arc de Triomphe. The horse ran at a similar pace as Through Seven Seas but finished 5th behind Ace Impact.

Later on, the horse was planned to enter the Champion Stakes as a replacement to Luxembourg who had suffered a leg infection, but was ultimately withdrawn due to a temperature.

Continuous was also invited to compete in the Japan Cup, but was ruled out after the horse showed stiffness after his latest exercise.

=== 2024 and 2025: four-and-five year old seasons ===
Continuous returned to racing on 22 June on the Hardwicke Stakes, where he was the most favored to win but finished fifth.

On his next race, the Royal Whip Stakes, held on August 17, where the horse won by a half-length lead. The horse would then go on to the Prix Foy where he finished 3rd, and later 15th at the Prix de l'Arc de Triomphe. He would also contest the Champion Stakes and the Hong Kong Vase later on that year, but were not successful in either races.

Continous' losing streak continued in to 2025, where he made a number of starts but was only successful in coming in third behind Byzantine Dream at that year's Red Sea Turf Handicap in Saudi Arabia. Continuous would retire after finishing last at that year's King George VI and Queen Elizabeth Stakes, before being shipped to Japan where he would stand stud at Aisling Japan at Niikappu, Hokkaido.

== Pedigree ==
Pedigree of Continuous
Sire Heart's Cry (JPN) b. 2001	Sunday Silence (USA) br. 1986	Halo (USA)	Hail to Reason (USA)
Sire Heart's Cry (JPN) b. 2001	Sunday Silence (USA) br. 1986	Halo (USA)	Cosmah (USA)
Sire Heart's Cry (JPN) b. 2001	Sunday Silence (USA) br. 1986	Wishing Well (USA)	Understanding (USA)
Sire Heart's Cry (JPN) b. 2001	Sunday Silence (USA) br. 1986	Wishing Well (USA)	Mountain Flower (USA)
Sire Heart's Cry (JPN) b. 2001	Irish Dance (JPN) b. 1990	Tony Bin (IRE)	Kampala (GB)
Sire Heart's Cry (JPN) b. 2001	Irish Dance (JPN) b. 1990	Tony Bin (IRE)	Seven Bridge (GB)
Sire Heart's Cry (JPN) b. 2001	Irish Dance (JPN) b. 1990	Buper Dance (USA)	Lyphard (USA)
Sire Heart's Cry (JPN) b. 2001	Irish Dance (JPN) b. 1990	Buper Dance (USA)	My Bupers
Dam Fluff (IRE) b. 2012	Galileo (IRE) b. 2002	Sadler's Wells (USA)	Northern Dancer (CAN)
Dam Fluff (IRE) b. 2012	Galileo (IRE) b. 2002	Sadler's Wells (USA)	Fairy Bridge (USA)
Dam Fluff (IRE) b. 2012	Galileo (IRE) b. 2002	Urban Sea (USA)	Miswaki (USA)
Dam Fluff (IRE) b. 2012	Galileo (IRE) b. 2002	Urban Sea (USA)	Allegretta (USA)
Dam Fluff (IRE) b. 2012	Sumora (IRE) b. 2002	Danehill (USA)	Danzig (USA)
Dam Fluff (IRE) b. 2012	Sumora (IRE) b. 2002	Danehill (USA)	Razyana (USA)
Dam Fluff (IRE) b. 2012	Sumora (IRE) b. 2002	Rain Flower (IRE)	Indian Ridge (IRE)
Dam Fluff (IRE) b. 2012	Sumora (IRE) b. 2002	Rain Flower (IRE)	Rose of Jericho (USA)
