= Stonehenge Stakes =

Flat horse race in Britain

- Class: Listed
- Location: Salisbury Racecourse; Salisbury, England
- Inaugurated: 2001
- Race type: Flat / Thoroughbred
- Sponsor: British Stallion Studs
- Website: www.salisburyracecourse.co.uk

Race information
- Distance: 1m (1,609 metres)
- Surface: Turf
- Track: Straight
- Qualification: Two-year-olds
- Weight: 9 st 3 lb Allowances; 5 lb for fillies Penalties; 5 lb for Group winners 3 lb for Listed winners
- Purse: £40,000 (2025); 1st: £22,684

Stonehenge Stakes
2026
Quest For Stars	Scommessa Sicura	Rocket Boy

Previous years
2025
Morris Dancer	A Bit Of Spirit	Mystic Moment
2024
New Century	Luther	The Parthenon
2023
Arabian Crown	Arabic Legend	Son
2022
Flying Honours	Stormbuster	Signcastle City
2021
Albahr	Power Of Beauty	Sweeping

2020-2011
2020
Cobh	Fancy Man	Surprise Exhibit
2019
Mohican Heights	Subjectivist	Berlin Tango
2018
Kuwait Currency	Dark Jedi	Dubai Dominion
2017
Mildenberger	Albishr	Tigre du Terre
2016
Montataire	Gemina	Sea Fox
2015
Tony Curtis	Opal Tiara	Platitude
2014
Elm Park	Groor	Mister Universe
2013
Washaar	Cool Bahamian	Dancealot
2012
Go Angellica	Califante	Timoneer
2011
Coupe de Ville	Lord Of the Shadows	Sound Advice

2010-2001
2010
Royal Exchange	Sonoran Sands	Ahlaain
2009
Big Audio	Dubai Miracle	Black Snowflake
2008
Snoqualmie Girl	On Our Way	Derbaas
2007
Mccartney	Scintillo	Yahrab
2006
Streets Ahead	Eddie Jock	Champery
2005
Doctor Dash	Emirates Gold	Jeu de Mot
2004
Perfectperformance	Grand Marque	Minnesota
2003
Sgt Pepper	America America	Fun And Games
2002
Mubeen	St Pancras	Chinkara
2001
Assaaf	Ashdown Express	Amour Sans Fin

The Stonehenge Stakes is a Listed flat horse race in Great Britain open to two-year-old horses. It is run at Salisbury over a distance of 1 mile (1,609 metres), and it is scheduled to take place each year in August. The race is named after Stonehenge, a prehistoric monument near Salisbury.

The race was first run in 2001, and was awarded Listed status in 2003.

== Winners ==
Year	Winner	Jockey	Trainer	Time
2001	Assaaf	Frankie Dettori	David Loder	1:43.52
2002	Mubeen	Richard Hughes	Ed Dunlop	1:42.60
2003	Sgt Pepper	Richard Hughes	Richard Hannon Sr.	1:45.70
2004	Perfectperformance	Frankie Dettori	Saeed bin Suroor	1:43.53
2005	Doctor Dash	Liam Keniry	David Elsworth	1:44.98
2006	Streets Ahead	Frankie Dettori	Andrew Balding	1:44.86
2007	Mccartney	Greg Fairley	Mark Johnston	1:44.20
2008	Snoqualmie Girl	Richard Quinn	David Elsworth	1:42.47
2009	Big Audio	Richard Hughes	Richard Hannon Sr.	1:44.33
2010	Royal Exchange	Richard Hughes	Richard Hannon Sr.	1:44.46
2011	Coupe de Ville	Pat Dobbs	Richard Hannon Sr.	1:45.40
2012	Go Angellica	Eddie Ahern	David Simcock	1:47.26
2013	Washaar	Paul Hanagan	Richard Hannon Sr.	1:43.62
2014	Elm Park	David Probert	Andrew Balding	1:44.37
2015	Tony Curtis	Pat Dobbs	Richard Hannon Jr.	1:45.44
2016	Montataire	Franny Norton	Mark Johnston	1:42.36
2017	Mildenberger	Franny Norton	Mark Johnston	1:42.15
2018	Kuwait Currency	Tom Marquand	Richard Hannon Jr.	1:42.92
2019	Mohican Heights	Jamie Spencer	David Simcock	1:42.74
2020	Cobh	Adam Kirby	Clive Cox	1:43.76
2021	Albahr	James Doyle	Charlie Appleby	1:44.86
2022	Flying Honours	James Doyle	Charlie Appleby	1:41.97
2023	Arabian Crown	William Buick	Charlie Appleby	1:42.59
2024	New Century	Oisin Murphy	Andrew Balding	1:42.84
2025	Morris Dancer	William Buick	John & Thady Gosden	1:43.59
2026	Quest For Stars	Connor Planas	Charlie Appleby	1:43.85

== See also ==
- Horse racing in Great Britain
- List of British flat horse races
