= Wolferton Stakes =

Flat horse race in Britain

- Class: Listed
- Location: Ascot Racecourse; Ascot, Berkshire, England
- Inaugurated: 2002
- Race type: Flat / Thoroughbred
- Website: Ascot

Race information
- Distance: 1m 1f 212y (2,004 metres)
- Surface: Turf
- Track: Right-handed
- Qualification: Four-years-old and up
- Weight: 9 st 5 lb Allowances 5 lb for fillies Penalties; 3 lb for Listed winners* 5 lb for Group 3 winners* * after 31 August 2024
- Purse: £120,000 (2025); 1st: £68,052

Wolferton Stakes
2026
Map Of Stars	Wimbledon Hawkeye	Dividend

Previous years
2025
Haatem	Galen	King's Gambit
2024
Israr	Haunted Dream	Torito
2023
Royal Champion	Bolshoi Ballet	Buckaroo
2022
Dubai Future	Cadillac	Harrovian
2021
Juan Elcano	Patrick Sarsfield	Solid Stone

2020-2011
2020
Mountain Angel	Sir Dragonet	Regal Reality
2019
Addeybb	Magic Wand	Elarqam
2018
Monarchs Glen	Euginio	Muntahaa
2017
Snoano	Majeed	Kidmenever
2016
Sir Isaac Newton	Second Wave	Revolutionist
2015
Mahsoob	Sennockian Star	Fire Fighting
2014
Contributer	Bold Sniper	Cafe Society
2013
Forgotten Voice	Sheikhzayedroad	Bana Wu
2012
Gatewood	Black Spirit	Mijhaar
2011
Beachfire	Lost In The Moment	Waydownsouth

2010–2002
2010
Rainbow Peak	Kings Gambit	Kingdom Of Fife
2009
Perfect Stride	Moonquake	Salute Him
2008
Supaseus	Many Volumes	Pinpoint
2007
Championship Point	Heaven Sent	Charlie Cool
2006
I'm So Lucky	Wild Savannah	Crosspeace
2005
Imperial Stride	Mullins Bay	Thyolo
2004
Red Fort	Promotion	Blythe Knight
2003
In Time's Eye	Persian Lightning	Akshar
2002
Ulundi	Arabie	Rasm

The Wolferton Stakes is a Listed flat horse race in Great Britain open to horses of four-year-old and up. It is run at Ascot over a distance of 1 mile 1 furlong and 212 yards (2,004 metres), and it is scheduled to take place each year in June on the first day of the Royal Ascot meeting.

The race was first run in 2002 when Royal Ascot was extended to five days to celebrate the Golden Jubilee of Elizabeth II. It was named after the village of Wolferton near Sandringham House and initially called the Wolferton Rated Stakes. In 2018 the race was moved to the opening Tuesday of Royal Ascot and the handicap element was removed to comply with a recommendation that no handicap should carry Listed status, making it a conventional Listed Race. Group 1 and 2 winners since the previous August are prohibited from entering.

== Records ==
Most successful horse:

- No horse has won this race more than once

Leading jockey (2 wins):

- William Buick - Beachfire (2011), Gatewood (2012)
- Daniel Tudhope - Addeybb (2019), Dubai Future (2022)
- James Doyle - Mountain Angel (2020), Haatem (2025)

Leading trainer (4 wins):

- John Gosden - Beachfire (2011), Gatewood (2012), Mahsoob (2015), Monarchs Glen (2018)

== Winners ==
=== Wolferton Handicap ===
- Weights given in stones and pounds.

Year	Winner	Age	Weight	Jockey	Trainer	SP	Time
2002	Ulundi	7	9-07	Richard Hughes	Paul Webber	10/1	2:08.07
2003	In Time's Eye	4	9-05	Pat Smullen	Dermot Weld	5/1	2:03.93
2004	Red Fort	4	8-08	Philip Robinson	Michael Jarvis	6/1	2:04.00
2005 (Note: The 2005 running took place at York)	Imperial Stride	4	8-11	Richard Hills	Sir Michael Stoute	25/1	2:06.09
2006	I'm So Lucky	4	8-07	Joe Fanning	Mark Johnston	16/1	2:04.15
2007	Championship Point	4	9-02	Darryll Holland	Mick Channon	25/1	2:10.84
2008	Supaseus	5	8-11	Steve Drowne	Hughie Morrison	12/1	2:06.81
2009	Perfect Stride	4	9-05	Ryan Moore	Sir Michael Stoute	8/1	2:03.24
2010	Rainbow Peak	4	9-04	Neil Callan	Michael Jarvis	13/8 F	2:04.50
2011	Beachfire	4	8-09	William Buick	John Gosden	12/1	2:10.48
2012	Gatewood	4	8-11	William Buick	John Gosden	3/1 F	2:08.00
2013	Forgotten Voice	8	9-02	Johnny Murtagh	Nicky Henderson	12/1	2:06.06
2014	Contributor	4	9-05	George Baker	Ed Dunlop	9/1	2:04.98
2015	Mahsoob	4	9-03	Paul Hanagan	John Gosden	7/4 F	2:05.33
2016	Sir Isaac Newton	4	9-00	Ryan Moore	Aidan O'Brien	7/1	2:07.59
2017	Snoano	5	9-00	David Allan	Tim Easterby	25/1	2:04.94

=== Wolferton Stakes ===
Year	Winner	Age	Jockey	Trainer	Time
2018	Monarchs Glen	4	Frankie Dettori	John Gosden	2:03.71
2019	Addeybb	5	Daniel Tudhope	William Haggas	2:06.90
2020	Mountain Angel	6	James Doyle	Roger Varian	2:11.90
2021	Juan Elcano	4	Andrea Atzeni	Kevin Ryan	2:04.36
2022	Dubai Future	6	Daniel Tudhope	Saeed bin Suroor	2:04.62
2023	Royal Champion	5	Jack Mitchell	Roger Varian	2:07.55
2024	Israr	5	Jim Crowley	John & Thady Gosden	2:03.29
2025	Haatem	4	James Doyle	Richard Hannon Jr.	2:04.79
2026	Map Of Stars	5	James McDonald	Francis-Henri Graffard	2:04.91

== See also ==
- Horse racing in Great Britain
- List of British flat horse races
