= Mogul (horse) =

British-bred Thoroughbred racehorse

- Sire: Galileo
- Grandsire: Sadler's Wells
- Dam: Shastye
- Damsire: Danehill
- Sex: Colt
- Foaled: 3 April 2017
- Country: United Kingdom
- Colour: Bay
- Breeder: Newsells Park Stud
- Owner: Derrick Smith, Susan Magnier & Michael Tabor
- Trainer: Aidan O'Brien
- Record: 11: 5-1-1
- Earnings: £1,533,173

Major wins
- Juvenile Stakes (2019); Gordon Stakes (2020); Grand Prix de Paris (2020); Hong Kong Vase (2020)

Mogul (foaled 3 April 2017) is a British-bred Irish-trained Thoroughbred racehorse. He showed very good form as a two-year-old in 2019 when he won two races including the Juvenile Stakes as well as finishing fourth in the Vertem Futurity Trophy. He improved to become a top-class middle distance performer in the following year, winning the Gordon Stakes, Grand Prix de Paris and the Hong Kong Vase.

== Background ==
Mogul is a bay horse with a white star and snip and four white socks bred in the England by the Hertfordshire-based Newsells Park Stud. In October 2018 the yearling was put up for auction at Tattersalls and was bought for 3.4 million guineas by Michael Magnier on behalf of the Coolmore Stud. He was sent into training with Aidan O'Brien at Ballydoyle and raced in the colours of the Coolmore partners Derrick Smith, Susan Magnier and Michael Tabor.

He was sired by Galileo, who won the Derby, Irish Derby and King George VI and Queen Elizabeth Stakes in 2001. Galileo became one of the world's leading stallions, earning his eleventh champion sire of Great Britain and Ireland title in 2019. His other progeny include Frankel, Nathaniel, New Approach, Rip Van Winkle, Found, Minding, Love and Ruler of the World. Mogul's dam Shastye showed above average racing ability, winning two minor races and running second in the Listed Pontefract Castle Stakes. She did better as a broodmare, producing several other winners including Secret Gesture (runner-up in the Epsom Oaks), Isaac Newton (International Stakes) and Mogul's full-brother Japan. Shastye was a half-sister to Sagamix and closely related to Sagawara, Nasram, Lope de Vega and Tambourine.

== Racing career ==
=== 2019: two-year-old season ===
Mogul was ridden by his trainer's son Donnacha O'Brien when he made his racecourse debut on 14 August in a maiden race over one mile at Gowran Park in which he started the 5/4 favourite and finished second to the Jim Bolger-trained Geometrical. The colt was partnered by Ryan Moore when he recorded his first success in a similar event at the Curragh, leading from the start and coming home three and a quarter lengths clear of his eleven opponents at odds of 8/13. Moore was again in the saddle when Mogul was stepped up in class and started 1/2 favourite for the Group 2 Champions Juvenile Stakes over one mile at Leopardstown Racecourse on 14 September. He raced in fourth place as his stablemate Cormorant set the pace before moving up to take the lead a furlong and a half from the finish and kept on well to win by one and a quarter lengths from the second favourite Sinawann. After the race Aidan O'Brien commented "We were delighted with him. He was trapped a little bit wide today and there was a nice pace on so he learned plenty... we've been very happy with his progress form race to race so hopefully he'll progress on again... We won't over-race him... we think he's a Classic horse".

The Group 1 Vertem Futurity Trophy had been planned for Doncaster Racecourse on 26 October but owing to the waterlogged state or the turf track it was rescheduled to take place six days later on the synthetic Tapeta surface at Newcastle Racecourse. With Donnacha O'Brien in the saddle, Mogul started second favourite but despite racing making good progress from the rear of the field in the last quarter mile he came home fourth behind Kameko, Innisfree and Year of the Tiger.

=== 2020: three-year-old season ===
The 2020 flat racing season in England and Ireland was disrupted by the COVID-19 pandemic and Mogul did not make his reappearance until 16 June when he was sent to England to contest the Group 2 King Edward VII Stakes over twelve furlongs at the Royal Ascot. Owing to the restructuring of the programme the race became, for the first time, a trial race for the Epsom Derby. He started the 10/11 favourite but after racing towards the rear of the six-runner field he was unable to make any real progress in the straight and came home fourth behind Pyledriver. The 241st running of the Epsom Derby took place a month later than usual, behind closed doors, over one and a half miles at Epsom Racecourse on 4 July and Mogul started the 7/1 third favourite in a seventeen-runner field. Ridden by Moore he raced in mid-division before making steady progress in the straight but never looked likely to win and finished sixth behind his unfancied stablemate Serpentine beaten seven lengths by the winner.

On 30 July at Goodwood Racecourse Mogul contested the Group 3 Gordon Stakes and went off the 9/2 third choice in the betting behind English King (winner of the Lingfield Derby Trial) and Al Aasy (Bahrain Trophy) in a field which also included Subjectivist (Glasgow Stakes) and Khalifa Sat (runner-up in the Derby). Moore positioned the colt just behind the leaders before moving up on the outside in the straight. He gained the advantage inside the final furlong and won by three quarters of a length from Highland Chief. After the race Aidan O'Brien said "We always felt he was a lovely horse, but we always felt he was going to take two runs and we were hoping to get that into him before the Derby. Obviously the Derby was only his second run and today was his third... he's a big, strong, powerful horse who carries a lot of weight, so it was always going to take racing to get him tuned up. We were delighted with him today and we still think there's more to come from him".

Mogul reappeared in the Great Voltigeur Stakes at York Racecourse on 19 August and started favourite but after being contention for most of the way he was beaten into third place behind Pyledriver and Highland Chief. On 13 September Mogul was sent to France for the Grand Prix de Paris over 2400 metres at Longchamp Racecourse in which he was ridden by Pierre-Charles Boudot. The race had previously been run in June or July but had been rescheduled owing to the COVID-19 Pandemic. He was made the 8.5/1 fifth choice in the betting behind Port Guillaume (Prix Hocquart), Serpentine, English King and In Swoop (Deutsches Derby). Mogul raced towards the rear of the field as his stablemate Nobel Prize set the pace but made rapid progress along the inside rail in the straight before being switched left and taking the lead 300 metres from the finish. He quickly established a clear advantage and won by two and a half lengths from the fast-finishing In Swoop. O'Brien who watched the race on television said "He's been showing so much speed, I thought we might be going the wrong way and maybe we should be going back to a mile and a quarter... He's obviously a fast horse, and he's able to quicken".

The colt was scheduled to run in the Prix de l'Arc de Triomphe on 4 October but the O'Brien contingent was withdrawn en masse when four horses failed drug tests, with the results being attributed to a batch of contaminated feed. Mogul was then sent to the United States and matched against older horses for the first time as he contested the Breeders' Cup Turf at Keeneland on 7 November. Starting the third choice in the betting he produced a sustained run from the rear of the field but never looked likely to win and came home fifth behind Tarnawa, Magical, Channel Maker and Lord North, beaten three lengths by the winner. On 13 December Mogul was sent to Sha Tin Racecourse in Hong Kong to contest the Hong Kong Vase over 2400 metres in which he was ridden by Moore and started the 1.6/1 second favourite behind the locally-trained Exultant, who had won the race in 2018. After settling in fourth place he moved up alongside the front-running Exultant in the straight before pulling clear in the closing stages to win by three lengths. After the race Moore said "He's a horse that we always expected a lot from... the race worked out nicely for him... He’s put them away very nicely. In reality, I was in front sooner than would have been ideal today but he took me there nicely. When he gets in front, he maybe lacks a bit of concentration still but he’s a beautiful looking horse. He's got a fantastic mind and it doesn't stress him. He'll be a really nice four year-old."

In the 2020 World's Best Racehorse Rankings, Mogul was rated on 121, making him the equal 34th best racehorse in the world.

== Pedigree ==
Pedigree of Mogul (GB), bay colt, 2017
Sire Galileo (IRE) 1998	Sadler's Wells (USA); 1981	Northern Dancer (CAN)	Nearctic
Sire Galileo (IRE) 1998	Sadler's Wells (USA); 1981	Northern Dancer (CAN)	Natalma (USA)
Sire Galileo (IRE) 1998	Sadler's Wells (USA); 1981	Fairy Bridge	Bold Reason
Sire Galileo (IRE) 1998	Sadler's Wells (USA); 1981	Fairy Bridge	Special
Sire Galileo (IRE) 1998	Urban Sea (USA) ch. 1989	Miswaki	Mr Prospector
Sire Galileo (IRE) 1998	Urban Sea (USA) ch. 1989	Miswaki	Hopespringseternal
Sire Galileo (IRE) 1998	Urban Sea (USA) ch. 1989	Allegretta (GB)	Lombard (GER)
Sire Galileo (IRE) 1998	Urban Sea (USA) ch. 1989	Allegretta (GB)	Anatevka (GER)
Dam Shastye (IRE) 2001	Danehill (USA); 1986	Danzig	Northern Dancer (CAN)
Dam Shastye (IRE) 2001	Danehill (USA); 1986	Danzig	Pas de Nom
Dam Shastye (IRE) 2001	Danehill (USA); 1986	Razyana	His Majesty
Dam Shastye (IRE) 2001	Danehill (USA); 1986	Razyana	Spring Adieu (CAN)
Dam Shastye (IRE) 2001	Saganeca (USA); 1988	Sagace (FR)	Luthier
Dam Shastye (IRE) 2001	Saganeca (USA); 1988	Sagace (FR)	Seneca
Dam Shastye (IRE) 2001	Saganeca (USA); 1988	Haglette	Hagley
Dam Shastye (IRE) 2001	Saganeca (USA); 1988	Haglette	Sucrette (Family: 11-d)

- Mogul is inbred 3 × 4 to Northern Dancer, meaning that this stallion appears in both the third and fourth generations of his pedigree.
