= Casual Look =

American-bred Thoroughbred racehorse

- Racing silks of William S. Farish III
- Sire: Red Ransom
- Grandsire: Roberto
- Dam: Style Setter
- Damsire: Manila
- Sex: Filly
- Foaled: 2000
- Country: United States
- Colour: Bay
- Breeder: William S. Farish III
- Owner: William S. Farish III
- Trainer: Andrew Balding
- Record: 11: 2-2-3
- Earnings: $599,874

Major wins
- Epsom Oaks (2003)

Casual Look (foaled May 10, 2000, in Kentucky) was the winning racehorse in The Oaks in 2003.

== Origins and racing career ==
Owned and bred by William S. Farish III, she was out of the mare Style Setter, a daughter of Manila, the 1986 Breeders' Cup Turf winner and that year's American Champion Male Turf Horse.

Her sire was Red Ransom whose career ended after just three races due to a tendon injury. Described by author Ken McLean in his 2006 book Designing Speed in the Racehorse as "a sensationally fast juvenile," Red Ransom was owned by Paul Mellon.

Casual Look was trained by Andrew Balding and ridden by Martin Dwyer in all her starts in Europe. In September 2002, she won her first race in her third start. Her next win came in her seventh start in the June 6, 2003 Epsom Oaks followed by a third-place finish in July's Irish Oaks. Following her seventh-place result in the Yorkshire Oaks and an eight in the Prix Vermeille at Longchamp Racecourse in Paris, France, she was sent to the United States. There, in the final start of her career, Casual Look ran third under jockey Robby Albarado in the October 3rd Queen Elizabeth II Challenge Cup Stakes at Keeneland Race Course in Lexington, Kentucky.

== Stud record ==
Retired to broodmare duty, she stands at Farish's Lane's End Farm in Versailles, Kentucky.

2005 Hidden Glance (USA): Bay colt, foaled 10 April, by Kingmambo (USA) - minor winner in the U.S.A.

2006

2007 Mushreq (USA): Bay colt (gelded), foaled 1 April, by Distorted Humor (USA) - won 4 races and placed 5 times from 19 starts in England and Dubai 2009–13

2008

2009 Casual Trick (USA) : Bay colt, foaled 25 May, by Bernadini (USA) - won 2 minor races in the U.S.A.

2010

2011 Casual Smile (GB): Chesnut filly, foaled 17 February, by Sea The Stars (IRE) - won 1 race, G3 Matchmaker S, Monmouth Park and placed four times from 7 starts in England and the U.S.A. 2013–15

2012

2013 Eyeshine (GB) : Bay filly, foaled 27 February, by Dubawi (IRE) - unplaced only start to date (22/04/16) in England 2016

2014 Filly by Oasis Dream (GB)

2015 Sportswear: Colt by Frankel (GB)
