= Great Voltigeur Stakes =

Flat horse race in Britain

- Class: Group 2
- Location: York Racecourse; York, England
- Inaugurated: 1950
- Race type: Flat / Thoroughbred
- Sponsor: SkyBet
- Website: York

Race information
- Distance: 1m 3f 188y (2,385 metres)
- Surface: Turf
- Track: Left-handed
- Qualification: Three-year-old colts and geldings
- Weight: 9 st 2 lb Penalties; 5 lb for Group 1 winners * 3 lb for Group 2 winners * * after 2021
- Purse: £250,000 (2026); 1st: £141,775

Great Voltigeur Stakes
2026
Maltese Cross	Pierre Bonnard	Christmas Day

Previous years
2025
Pride Of Arras	Carmers	Arabian Force
2024
Los Angeles	Illinois	King's Gambit
2023
Continuous	Castle Way	Gregory
2022
Deauville Legend	Secret State	El Bodegon
2021
Yibir	The Mediterranean	Youth Spirit

2020-2011
2020
Pyledriver	Highland Chief	Mogul
2019
Logician	Constantinople	Norway
2018
Old Persian	Cross Counter	Kew Gardens
2017
Cracksman	Venice Beach	Mirage Dancer
2016
Idaho	Housesofparliament	Across The Stars
2015
Storm The Stars	Bondi Beach	Giovanni Canaletto
2014
Postponed	Snow Sky	Odeon
2013
Telescope	Foundry	Secret Number
2012
Thought Worthy	Main Sequence	Encke
2011
Sea Moon	Al Kazeem	Seville

2010-2001
2010
Rewilding	Midas Touch	Joshua Tree
2009
Monitor Closely	Mastery	Father Time
2008
Centennial	Top Lock	Scintillo
2007
Lucarno	Yellowstone	Macarthur
2006
Youmzain	Red Rocks	Puerto Rico
2005
Hard Top	The Geezer	Avalon
2004
Rule of Law	Let The Lion Roar	Go For Gold
2003
Powerscourt	Brian Boru	Hawk Flyer
2002
Bandari	Highest	Bollin Eric
2001
Milan	Storming Home	Demophilos

2000-1991
2000
Air Marshall	Marienbard	Dalampour
1999
Fantastic Light	Bienamado	Glamis
1998
Sea Wave	Rabah	Prolix
1997
Stowaway	Silver Patriarch	Kingfisher Mill
1996
Dushyantor	Mons	Royal Court
1995
Pentire	Singspiel	Luso
1994
Sacrament	Ionio	Broadway Flyer
1993
Bob's Return	Foresee	Declassified
1992
Bonny Scot	Sonus	Assessor
1991
Corrupt	Saddlers' Hall	Collins Avenue

1990-1981
1990
Belmez	Snurge	Karinga Bay
1989
Zalazl	Terimon	Warrshan
1988
Sheriff's Star	Insan	Alwuhush
1987
Reference Point	Dry Dock	Colchis
1986
Nisnas	Mashkour	Moon Madness
1985
Damister	Shardari	Infantry
1984
Rainbow Quest	Gold And Ivory	Head For Heights
1983
Seymour Hicks	Dazari	Teenoso
1982
Electric	Diamond Shoal	Touching Wood
1981
Glint of Gold	Little Wolf	Capstan

1980-1970
1980
Prince Bee	Light Cavalry	Saviour
1979
Noble Saint	Buttress	Milford
1978
Whitstead	Sexton Blake	Icelandic
1977
Alleged	Classic Example	Lucky Sovereign
1976
Hawkberry	Norfolk Air	General Ironside
1975
Patch	Sea Anchor	Royal Manacle
1974
Bustino	English Prince	Straight As A Die
1973
Buoy	Duke of Ragusa	Solar Wind
1972
Our Mirage	Avancer	Ormindo
1971
Athens Wood	Frascati	Spoiled Lad
1970
Meadowville	Rock Roi	Pembroke Castle

The Great Voltigeur Stakes is a Group 2 flat horse race in Great Britain open to three-year-old colts and geldings. It is run at York over a distance of 1 mile 3 furlongs and 188 yards (2,385 metres), and it is scheduled to take place each year in August.

== History ==
The event is named after Voltigeur, the Yorkshire-trained winner of the Derby and St Leger in 1850. It was established in 1950, and it was initially called the Voltigeur Stakes. The word "Great" was added to the title in 1957.

The Great Voltigeur Stakes serves as a trial for the following month's St Leger, and fifteen horses have achieved victory in both races. The first was Premonition in 1953, and the most recent was Continuous in 2023.

The event is currently held on the opening day of York's four-day Ebor Festival meeting.

== Records ==
Leading jockey (9 wins):

- Lester Piggott – Pindari (1959), St Paddy (1960), Ragazzo (1965), Meadowville (1970), Athens Wood (1971), Our Mirage (1972), Alleged (1977), Noble Saint (1979), Prince Bee (1980)

Leading trainer (7 wins):

- Sir Michael Stoute – Electric (1982), Sacrament (1994), Fantastic Light (1999), Air Marshall (2000), Hard Top (2005), Sea Moon (2011), Telescope (2013)

== Winners ==
Year	Winner	Jockey	Trainer	Time
1950	Castle Rock	Bill Rickaby	Jack Jarvis	2:38.00
1951	Border Legend	Billy Nevett	Richard Peacock	2:37.60
1952	Childe Harold	Jack Brace	Bill Dutton	2:34.60
1953	Premonition	Harry Carr	Cecil Boyd-Rochfort	2:41.20
1954	Blue Sail	Bill Rickaby	Paddy Prendergast	3:02.60
1955	Acropolis	Doug Smith	George Colling	2:33.40
1956	Hornbeam	Joe Mercer	Robert Colling	2:47.20
1957	Brioche	Edgar Britt	Charles Elsey	2:37.00
1958	Alcide	Harry Carr	Cecil Boyd-Rochfort	2:38.40
1959	Pindari	Lester Piggott	Noel Murless	2:35.60
1960	St Paddy	Lester Piggott	Noel Murless	2:35.20
1961	Just Great	Scobie Breasley	Staff Ingham	2:35.60
1962	Hethersett	Frankie Durr	Dick Hern	2:37.00
1963	Ragusa	Garnet Bougoure	Paddy Prendergast	2:36.80
1964	Indiana	Jimmy Lindley	Jack Watts	2:41.80
1965	Ragazzo	Lester Piggott	Paddy Prendergast	2:38.80
1966	Hermes	Greville Starkey	John Oxley	2:42.20
1967	Great Host	Bill Williamson	Paddy Prendergast	2:39.20
1968	Connaught	Sandy Barclay	Noel Murless	2:38.20
1969	Harmony Hall (Note: Intermezzo finished first in 1969, but he was relegated to fourth place following a stewards' inquiry)	Bill Williamson	Gordon Smyth	2:38.40
1970	Meadowville	Lester Piggott	Michael Jarvis	2:41.80
1971	Athens Wood	Lester Piggott	Harry Thomson Jones	2:37.80
1972	Our Mirage	Lester Piggott	Barry Hills	2:34.70
1973	Buoy	Joe Mercer	Dick Hern	2:40.00
1974	Bustino	Joe Mercer	Dick Hern	2:33.23
1975	Patch	Pat Eddery	Peter Walwyn	2:30.44
1976	Hawkberry	Christy Roche	Paddy Prendergast	2:33.17
1977	Alleged	Lester Piggott	Vincent O'Brien	2:31.10
1978	Whitstead	Brian Taylor	Ryan Price	2:30.70
1979	Noble Saint	Lester Piggott	Robert Armstrong	2:39.33
1980	Prince Bee	Lester Piggott	Dick Hern	2:34.88
1981	Glint of Gold	John Matthias	Ian Balding	2:35.81
1982	Electric	Walter Swinburn	Michael Stoute	2:32.67
1983	Seymour Hicks	Willie Carson	John Dunlop	2:33.97
1984	Rainbow Quest	Pat Eddery	Jeremy Tree	2:28.80
1985	Damister (Note: Shardari finished first in 1985, but he was relegated to second place following a stewards' inquiry)	Pat Eddery	Jeremy Tree	2:42.35
1986	Nisnas	Richard Quinn	Paul Cole	2:32.14
1987	Reference Point	Steve Cauthen	Henry Cecil	2:41.09
1988	Sheriff's Star	Tony Ives	Lady Herries	2:26.30
1989	Zalazl	Steve Cauthen	Henry Cecil	2:30.61
1990	Belmez	Steve Cauthen	Henry Cecil	2:30.29
1991	Corrupt	Pat Eddery	Neville Callaghan	2:34.16
1992	Bonny Scot	Frankie Dettori	Luca Cumani	2:30.22
1993	Bob's Return	Philip Robinson	Mark Tompkins	2:31.49
1994	Sacrament	Walter Swinburn	Michael Stoute	2:28.24
1995	Pentire	Michael Hills	Geoff Wragg	2:29.86
1996	Dushyantor	Pat Eddery	Henry Cecil	2:30.64
1997	Stowaway	Frankie Dettori	Saeed bin Suroor	2:33.23
1998	Sea Wave	Frankie Dettori	Saeed bin Suroor	2:25.12
1999	Fantastic Light	Gary Stevens	Sir Michael Stoute	2:29.05
2000	Air Marshall	Johnny Murtagh	Sir Michael Stoute	2:33.01
2001	Milan	Michael Kinane	Aidan O'Brien	2:29.32
2002	Bandari	Richard Hills	Mark Johnston	2:28.80
2003	Powerscourt	Michael Kinane	Aidan O'Brien	2:27.81
2004	Rule of Law	Frankie Dettori	Saeed bin Suroor	2:37.10
2005	Hard Top	Michael Kinane	Sir Michael Stoute	2:32.04
2006	Youmzain	Richard Hughes	Mick Channon	2:34.93
2007	Lucarno	Jimmy Fortune	John Gosden	2:33.07
2008 (Note: The 2008 running took place at Goodwood)	Centennial	Jimmy Fortune	John Gosden	2:41.70
2009	Monitor Closely	Jimmy Fortune	Peter Chapple-Hyam	2:29.50
2010	Rewilding	Frankie Dettori	Mahmood Al Zarooni	2:28.93
2011	Sea Moon	Richard Hughes	Sir Michael Stoute	2:34.94
2012	Thought Worthy	William Buick	John Gosden	2:35.96
2013	Telescope	Ryan Moore	Sir Michael Stoute	2:29.32
2014	Postponed	Andrea Atzeni	Luca Cumani	2:27.29
2015	Storm The Stars	Pat Cosgrave	William Haggas	2:30.30
2016	Idaho	Seamie Heffernan	Aidan O'Brien	2:29.41
2017	Cracksman	Frankie Dettori	John Gosden	2:34.65
2018	Old Persian	James Doyle	Charlie Appleby	2:28.34
2019	Logician	Frankie Dettori	John Gosden	2:27.91
2020	Pyledriver	Martin Dwyer	William Muir	2:30.57
2021	Yibir	James Doyle	Charlie Appleby	2:28.27
2022	Deauville Legend	Daniel Muscutt	James Ferguson	2:32.63
2023	Continuous	Ryan Moore	Aidan O'Brien	2:27.45
2024	Los Angeles	Ryan Moore	Aidan O'Brien	2:27.80
2025	Pride Of Arras	Rossa Ryan	Ralph Beckett	2:30.15
2026	Maltese Cross	Tom Marquand	William Haggas	2:32.04

== See also ==
- Horse racing in Great Britain
- List of British flat horse races
