= Ascendant Stakes =

Flat horse race in Britain

- Class: Listed
- Location: Haydock Park Racecourse; Haydock, England
- Race type: Flat / Thoroughbred
- Sponsor: Betfair
- Website: Haydock Park

Race information
- Distance: 1m 37y (1,643 metres)
- Surface: Turf
- Track: Left-handed
- Qualification: Two-year-olds
- Weight: 9 st 2 lb; Allowances; 5 lb for fillies Penalties; 5 lb for Group winners 3 lb for Listed winners
- Purse: £38,200 (2021); 1st: £22,967

Ascendant Stakes
2026
First Law	Rocket Boy	Arthurian

Previous years
2025
Bow Echo	Publish	Shayem
2024
Luther	Qilin Queen	Eternal Elixir
2023
Al Musmak	Macduff	Remaadd
2022
Naval Power	Dancing Magic	Captain Winters
2021
Triple Time	Hafit	Dukebox

2020-2011
2020
Fancy Man	Alenquer	William Bligh
2019
Pyledriver	Sound Of Cannons	Tammani
2018
Great Scot	Floating Artist	Certain Lad
2017
Chilean	Learn By Heart	Dee Ex Bee
2016
Frankuus	Star of Rory	Cunco
2015
Foundation	Champagne City	Manaafidh
2014
Celestial Path	Medrano	Smaih
2013
Chief Barker	Chriselliam	Lily Rules
2012
Havana Gold	Al Waab	Mirsaale
2011
Caledonian Spring	Crius	Leqqaa

2010-2007
2010
Singapore Lilly	Measuring Time	Robin Hood
2009
Emerald Commander	Nideeb	Black Snowflake
2007
Campanologist	Eileen's Violet	Dan Tucket

The Ascendant Stakes is a Listed flat horse race in Great Britain open to two-year-old horses. It is run at Haydock Park over a distance of 1 mile and 37 yards (1,643 metres). The race was first run in 2007, and it is scheduled to take place each year in September. The race is run on the same day as Haydock's feature race of the season, the Group One Haydock Sprint Cup.

== Records ==
Leading jockey (2 wins):

- Richard Hughes – Havana Gold (2012), Chief Barker (2013)
- William Buick - Naval Power (2022), First Law (2026)

Leading trainer (3 wins):

- Richard Hannon Sr. – Emerald Commander (2009), Havana Gold (2012), Chief Barker (2013)

== Winners ==
Year	Winner	Jockey	Trainer	Time
2007	Campanologist	Kerrin McEvoy	Mark Johnston	1:47.23
2008	Abandoned due to waterlogging
2009	Emerald Commander	Dane O'Neill	Richard Hannon Sr.	1:48.99
2010	Singapore Lilly	Chris Catlin	Mick Channon	1:41.27
2011	Caledonian Spring	Eddie Ahern	Paul D'Arcy	1:43.68
2012	Havana Gold	Richard Hughes	Richard Hannon Sr.	1:43.69
2013	Chief Barker	Richard Hughes	Richard Hannon Sr.	1:45.69
2014	Celestial Path	Luke Morris	Sir Mark Prescott	1:45.02
2015	Foundation	Frankie Dettori	John Gosden	1:45.93
2016	Frankuus	Franny Norton	Mark Johnston	1:47.97
2017	Chilean	Silvestre de Sousa	Martyn Meade	1:47.73
2018	Great Scot	Richard Kingscote	Tom Dascombe	1:49.89
2019	Pyledriver	P. J. McDonald	William Muir	1:45.37
2020	Fancy Man	Ryan Moore	Richard Hannon Jr.	1:48.01
2021	Triple Time	Andrea Atzeni	Kevin Ryan	1:41.21
2022	Naval Power	William Buick	Charlie Appleby	1:43.32
2023	Al Musmack	Ben Curtis	Roger Varian	1:44.30
2024	Luther	Daniel Tudhope	Charlie Fellowes	1:42.11
2025	Bow Echo	Billy Loughnane	George Boughey	1:40.22
2026	First Law	William Buick	Charlie Appleby	1:51.00

== See also ==
- Horse racing in Great Britain
- List of British flat horse races
