= 2020 King George VI and Queen Elizabeth Stakes =

70th running of the King George VI and Queen Elizabeth Stakes

70th King George VI and Queen Elizabeth Stakes
- King George VI and Queen Elizabeth Stakes
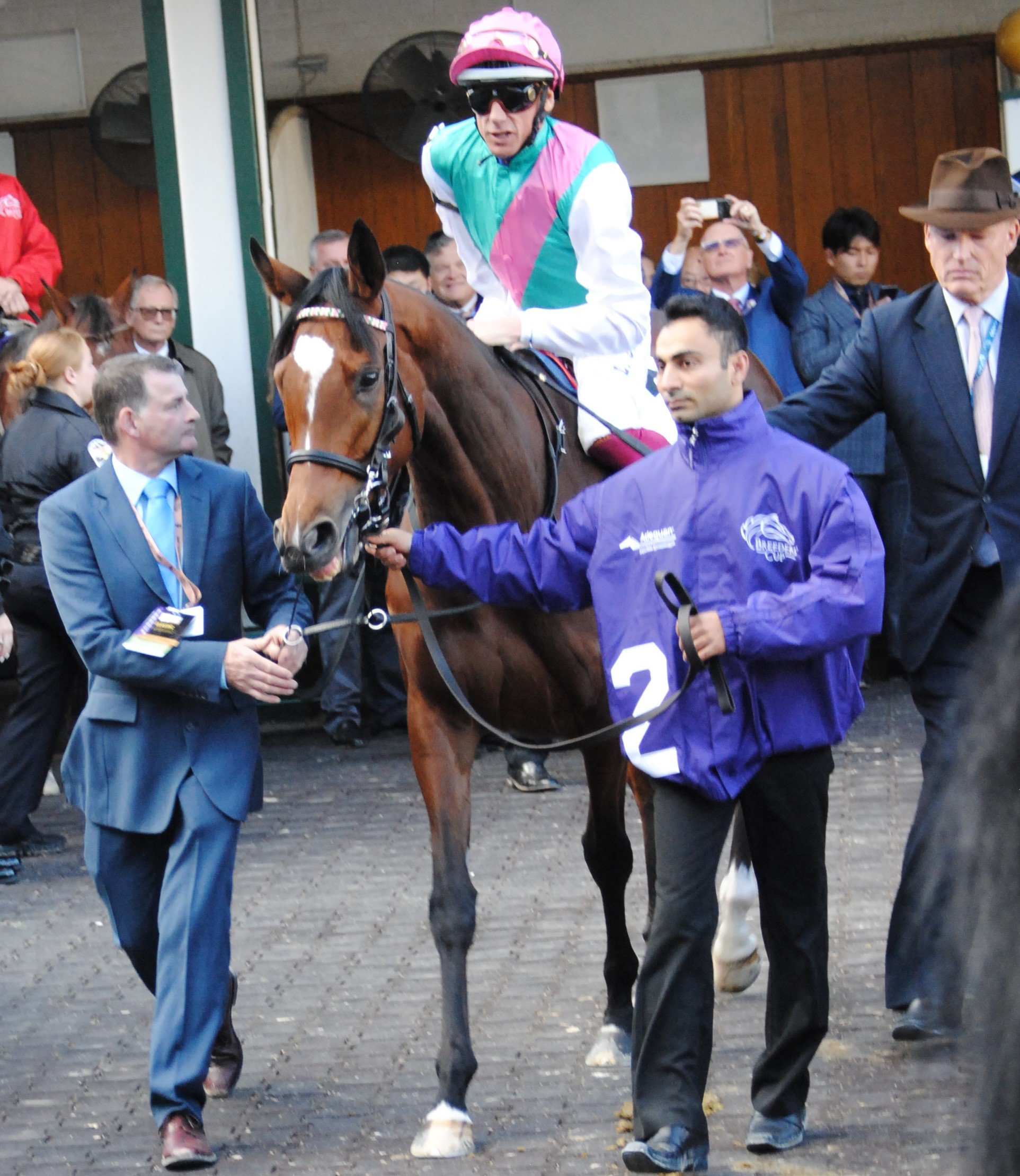
- Enable at the 2018 Breeders' Cup
- Location: Ascot Racecourse
- Date: 25 July 2020
- Winning horse: Enable
- Starting price: 4/9
- Jockey: Frankie Dettori
- Trainer: John Gosden
- Owner: Khalid Abullah

The 2020 King George VI and Queen Elizabeth Stakes was a horse race held at Ascot Racecourse on Saturday 25 July 2020. It was the 70th running of the King George VI and Queen Elizabeth Stakes.

The winner was Enable, a six-year-old bay mare trained at Newmarket by John Gosden, ridden by Frankie Dettori and owned by Khalid Abdullah. Enable's victory was a record-equalling seventh in the race for Dettori, the fifth for Gosden and the fourth for Khalid Abdullah. Enable became the first horse to win the King George three times, and the second six-year-old to win the race after Swain in 1998. The race was contested by only three runners, the smallest field in the event's history.

== Race details ==
- Sponsor: QIPCO
- Purse: £400,000; First prize: £226,840
- Surface: Turf
- Going: Good to Firm
- Distance: 12 furlongs
- Number of runners: 3
- Winner's time: 2:28.92

== Full result ==
Pos.	Marg.	Horse (bred)	Age	Jockey	Trainer (Country)	Odds
1		Enable (GB)	6	Frankie Dettori	John Gosden (GB)	4/9
2	5½	Sovereign (IRE)	4	William Buick	Aidan O'Brien (IRE)	12/1
3	11	Japan (GB)	4	Ryan Moore	Aidan O'Brien (IRE)	5/2

== Winner's details ==
Further details of the winner, Enable

- Sex: Mare
- Foaled: 12 February 2014
- Country: United Kingdom
- Sire: Nathaniel
- Owner: Khalid Abullah
- Breeder: Juddmonte Farms

== See also ==
- 2020 British Champions Series
