= Addeybb =

Irish-bred Thoroughbred racehorse

- Racing silks of Sheikh AAhmed Al Maktoum
- Sire: Pivotal
- Grandsire: Polar Falcon
- Dam: Bush Cat
- Damsire: Kingmambo
- Sex: Gelding
- Foaled: 9 February 2014
- Country: Ireland
- Colour: Chestnut
- Breeder: Rabbah Bloodstock
- Owner: Ahmed Al Maktoum
- Trainer: William Haggas
- Record: 28: 13-5-4
- Earnings: £3,630,656

Major wins
- Lincoln Handicap (2018); Sandown Mile (2018); Wolferton Stakes (2019); Rose of Lancaster Stakes (2019); Ranvet Stakes (2020); Queen Elizabeth Stakes (2020,2021); Doonside Cup (2020); Champion Stakes (2020); Prix du Conseil de Paris (2022)

Addeybb (/əˈdeɪb/ ə-DAYB; foaled 9 February 2014) is an Irish-bred, British-trained Thoroughbred racehorse. He excels over distances of around 2000 metres (ten furlongs) and is noted for his toughness, consistency and aptitude for racing on soft ground. He did not race as a two-year-old and as a three-year-old in 2017 he won three minor races from five starts before improving in the following year to win the Lincoln Handicap and the Sandown Mile. He made further progress in 2019 when he won the Wolferton Stakes and the Rose of Lancaster Stakes as well as finishing second in the Champion Stakes. As a six-year-old in 2020 he established himself as a world-class middle-distance performer, winning the Ranvet Stakes and the Queen Elizabeth Stakes in Australia before returning to Europe to win the Doonside Cup and the Champion Stakes.

== Background ==
Addeybb is a chestnut horse with a white star bred in Ireland by Rabbah Bloodstock. As a yearling in October 2015 he was consigned to the Tattersalls sale and was bought for £200,000 by Hamdan Al Maktoum's Shadwell Estate Company. He entered the ownership of Hamdan Al Maktoum's brother Ahmed Al Maktoum and was sent into training with William Haggas at the Somerville Lodge stable in Newmarket, Suffolk.

He was from the seventeenth crop of foals sired by Pivotal, a top class sprinter who won the King's Stand Stakes and the Nunthorpe Stakes in 1996. He went on to become a very successful breeding stallion, getting the winners of more than a thousand races across a range of distances including Sariska, Somnus, Farhh, Kyllachy and Immortal Verse. Addeybb's dam Bush Cat was a Kentucky-bred mare who raced in England and won one minor race from twelve starts. Bush Cat's dam Arbusha was a full-sister to the dam of Strategic Choice and, as a descendant of the American broodmare Levee, was closely related to many good winners including Shuvee and Meneval.

== Racing career ==
=== 2017: three-year-old season ===
Addeybb was gelded before the start of his racing career and did not race until he was three years old. After finishing fourth in a maiden race at Newbury Racecourse on his racecourse debut Addeybb recorded his first success in a similar event at Haydock Park on 14 June. A month later he started at odds of 3/1 for a minor handicap race over one mile at Ascot Racecourse and won by a neck after disputing the lead from the start. He finished third in a handicap at Goodwood Racecourse in August and ended his campaign by winning a handicap over nine furlongs on good to soft ground at Newmarket Racecourse on 29 September.

=== 2018: four-year-old season ===
Addeybb began his second campaign in the Lincoln Handicap at Doncaster Racecourse on 24 March when he was ridden by James Doyle and went off at odds of 5/1 in a twenty-runner field. Carrying 128 pounds he was among the leaders from the start, went to the front approaching the final furlong and drew away to win by two and three quarter lengths from the favourite Lord Glitters. After the race Doyle commented "This fella was strong throughout. When he gets there, he doesn't do a whole lot, but he quickened up well and put the race to bed... He's such an unassuming horse. He goes through the motions, he's not a flashy work horse at home... he's certainly a horse on the up.

The gelding was then moved up in class and started favourite for the Group 2 Sandown Mile on 27 April and won again in "impressive" fashion, taking the lead a furlong out and coming home almost three lengths clear of Stormy Antarctic. Maureen Haggas, representing her husband William commented "He is just such a nice, straightforward horse. He has got a great temperament and tries his guts out and you can’t ask for much more than that. He is a grand horse." He was then stepped up to the highest class for the Group 1 Lockinge Stakes at Newbury three weeks later but made no impact and finished eighth behind the filly Rhododendron.

After a break of five months Addeybb returned to the track in October for the Queen Elizabeth II Stakes at Ascot. He appeared to be going well before fading badly in the closing stages and coming home twelfth behind Roaring Lion, beaten more than twenty lengths by the winner. For his final run of the season the gelding was dropped in class to contest the Listed Churchill Stakes on the synthetic Polytrack surface at Lingfield Park and finished third behind the seven-year-old Master of the World.

=== 2019: five-year-old season ===
On his first start of 2019 Addeybb finished fourth when starting favourite for the Group 2 Huxley Stakes over ten furlongs at Chester Racecourse in May. On soft ground Royal Ascot in June the gelding was ridden by Daniel Tudhope in the Listed Wolferton Stakes. Equipped with cheekpieces for the first time he took the lead inside the final furlong and went clear to win "comfortably" by two and a half lengths and a nose from Magic Wand and Elarqam after gaining the advantage inside the final furlong. Tudhope commented "He was in a different league out there today and he was travelled so well, I couldn’t believe how much horse I had under me."

At York Racecourse in July he started favourite for the York Stakes but was beaten into second place by Elarqam. Richard Kingscote took the ride when the gelding started 11/10 favourite for the Group 3 Rose of Lancaster Stakes at Haydock on 10 August. He overtook the front-running Raise You just over a furlong from the finish and pulled clear in the closing stages to win by two and a quarter lengths. After the race Kingscote said "He loves [the soft ground]. He showed that at Ascot. He is a good horse on his day and York probably a few things didn't suite him. But today went really smooth." Addeybb ended his season in the Champion Stakes at Ascot on 19 October, when he kept on well in the straight, to take second place, beaten three quarters of a length by Magical.

In the 2019 World's Best Racehorse Rankings Addeybb was given a rating of 119, making him the 57th best racehorse in the world.

=== 2020: six-year-old season ===
Tom Marquand became Addeybb's regular jockey in 2020. In the early part of the year the gelding was sent to race in Australia and made his antipodean debut in the Grade 1 Ranvet Stakes over 2000 metres at Rosehill Racecourse on 21 March when he went off the 2.4/1 third choice behind Verry Elleegant and Avilius. The race was run behind closed doors owing to the COVID-19 pandemic. He took the lead soon after the start and rallied after being overtaken by Verry Elleegant in the straight to regain the advantage and win by half a length. Willam Haggas said "I thought Tom gave him an excellent ride and the horse showed plenty of guts and courage".

Three weeks later Addeybb started favourite for the Queen Elizabeth Stakes over the same distance at Randwick Racecourse when his eleven opponents included Verry Elleegant, Vow And Declare, Happy Clapper, Danon Premium, Melody Belle (Empire Rose Stakes), Te Akau Shark (Chipping Norton Stakes), Kings Will Dream (Turnbull Stakes and Gailo Chop (2018 Ranvet Stakes). Addeybb settled in third place behind the front-running Gailo Chop before taking the lead entering the straight. He repelled a challenge from Danon Premium and then drew away in impressive style to win by two and three quarter lengths. After the race Marquand commented "What a tough, straightforward, genuine horse. He just switches off, knows when to turn it on, and he just drops his head and runs for you and you don’t even have to ask him. He is a horse that goes through wet ground as if it is not even there. That is just one of his main attributes and shows how tough he is, because he just doesn’t care. He goes straight over the top of it, and today travelling around there was never a moment where I thought I was not going to pick up."

On his return to Europe Addeybb contested the Prince of Wales's Stakes at Royal Ascot which was run behind closed doors. He started at odds of 7/2 and briefly took the lead approaching the final furlong before being overtaken and beaten into second place by the four-year-old Lord North. After a three-month break the gelding was dropped back in class for the Listed Doonside Cup at Ayr Racecourse in September and won by three quarters of a length from Lord Glitters, to whom he was conceding seven pounds in weight. Haggas said "I'm chuffed to bits with him. He came good at the end of the race. He's such a genuine, kind horse. He'd prefer softer ground, but he dug in and I'm thrilled."

At Ascot on 17 October Addeybb started at odds of 9/1 when he made his second attempt to win the Champion Stakes. Magical started favourite while the other eight runners included Lord North, Japan, Serpentine, Mishriff, Skalleti, Pyledriver, Desert Encounter (Canadian International Stakes) and Extra Elusive (Winter Hill Stakes). Addeybb started well and settled in second place behind Serpentine before overtaking the Derby winner in the straight, opening up a clear advantage, and staying on well to win by two and a quarter lengths from Skalleti with Magical half a length back in third. After the race William Haggas commented Addeybb has been absolutely fantastic. Since he won the Wolferton last year and we put the cheekpieces on, he has just been so consistent. He was really on it today. He looked fantastic beforehand but he was grumpy and difficult to saddle, which is a good sign for him. He has got such a marvelous nature and this is tailor-made for him."

In the 2020 World's Best Racehorse Rankings, Addeybb was rated the equal third best racehorse in the world, five pounds behind the top-rated Ghaiyyath.

=== 2021: seven-year-old season ===
On 27 March 2021, Addeybb resumed racing in Australia where he attempted to win consecutive Ranvet Stakes at Rosehill Racecourse as the 10/9 favourite. The previous year he defeated Verry Elleegant, however since that defeat Verry Elleegant had gone on to win five Group 1 races. The 2021 version of the race saw Verry Elleegant installed the second favourite at odds of 7/4. The race mirrored the 2020 Ranvet as Verry Elleegant moved up to eyeball Addeybb coming to the turn before another stirring, straight-long struggle but this time the mare got the better of Addeybb winning by a length.

== Pedigree ==
Pedigree of Addeybb (IRE), chestnut gelding, 2014
| Sire Pivotal (GB) 1993 | Polar Falcon (USA); 1987 | Nureyev | Northern Dancer (CAN) |
| Sire Pivotal (GB) 1993 | Polar Falcon (USA); 1987 | Nureyev | Special |
| Sire Pivotal (GB) 1993 | Polar Falcon (USA); 1987 | Marie d'Argonne (FR) | Jefferson (GB) |
| Sire Pivotal (GB) 1993 | Polar Falcon (USA); 1987 | Marie d'Argonne (FR) | Mohair |
| Sire Pivotal (GB) 1993 | Fearless Revival; 1987 | Cozzene (USA) | Caro (IRE) |
| Sire Pivotal (GB) 1993 | Fearless Revival; 1987 | Cozzene (USA) | Ride The Trails |
| Sire Pivotal (GB) 1993 | Fearless Revival; 1987 | Stufida | Bustino |
| Sire Pivotal (GB) 1993 | Fearless Revival; 1987 | Stufida | Zerbinetta |
| Dam Bush Cat (USA) 2000 | Kingmambo (USA); 1990 | Mr Prospector | Raise A Native |
| Dam Bush Cat (USA) 2000 | Kingmambo (USA); 1990 | Mr Prospector | Gold Digger |
| Dam Bush Cat (USA) 2000 | Kingmambo (USA); 1990 | Miesque | Nureyev |
| Dam Bush Cat (USA) 2000 | Kingmambo (USA); 1990 | Miesque | Pasadoble |
| Dam Bush Cat (USA) 2000 | Arbusha (USA); 1989 | Danzig | Northern Dancer (CAN) |
| Dam Bush Cat (USA) 2000 | Arbusha (USA); 1989 | Danzig | Pas de Nom |
| Dam Bush Cat (USA) 2000 | Arbusha (USA); 1989 | Lulu Mon Amour | Tom Rolfe |
| Dam Bush Cat (USA) 2000 | Arbusha (USA); 1989 | Lulu Mon Amour | Sister Shu (Family: 9-f) |

- Addeybb is inbred 3 × 4 to Nureyev, meaning that this stallion appears in both the third and fourth generations of his pedigree. He is also inbred 4 × 4 to Northern Dancer.
