= Emmet McNamara =

Irish jockey

Emmet McNamara (born 9 January 1990) is an Irish jockey who competes in flat racing. He gained his most notable success to date when riding Serpentine to victory in the 2020 Epsom Derby. It was McNamara's first ride in the race and provided trainer Aidan O'Brien with a record eighth Derby win.

== Background ==
McNamara grew up in County Limerick and comes from a racing background. His father, Eric McNamara, is a National Hunt trainer based in Rathkeale and a brother, Conor McNamara, is a conditional jockey. McNamara was champion for two years running on the pony racing circuit and rode a record total of 65 winners.

== Career ==
McNamara's first win as an apprentice jockey came in 2007 when riding Prince Livius at Tipperary for trainer Tom Hogan. The following year he was champion Irish apprentice jockey.

In 2014 he started working for trainer Aidan O'Brien at Ballydoyle, where he was a work rider as well as riding in races. In 2015 he won the Group 2 Beresford Stakes at the Curragh Racecourse on Port Douglas and in 2017 he won the Group 3 Derrinstown Stud Derby Trial on Douglas Macarthur. McNamara combined his riding with studying at Griffith College Dublin, graduating with a first-class honours degree in accounting and finance in 2018.

On 27 June 2020 McNamara rode Tiger Moth for O'Brien in the Irish Derby and was beaten by a head by stablemate and favourite Santiago. A few days later he was offered a ride in the Epsom Derby on Serpentine, one of O'Brien's six runners in the race. It was his first ride in the Derby, which was held on 4 July, having been postponed due to the COVID-19 pandemic. For the same reason it was being held without spectators (behind closed doors). Serpentine, who went off at odds of 25/1, soon established an unassailable lead and stayed on to win by five-and-a-half lengths. It was McNamara's first win since the previous October, and provided O'Brien with a record eighth Derby win. After the race McNamara said: "All I heard was the horse breathing. I got a little bit of a freebie. Aidan said go your own tempo give him a breather and then keep going. He was right."

== Major wins ==
(United Kingdom) Great Britain

- Epsom Derby - Serpentine (2020)
