= Serpentine (horse) =

Irish Thoroughbred racehorse

- Racing silks of Susan Magnier
- Sire: Galileo
- Grandsire: Sadler's Wells
- Dam: Remember When
- Damsire: Danehill Dancer
- Sex: Gelding
- Foaled: 20 March 2017
- Country: Ireland
- Colour: Chestnut
- Breeder: Coolmore Stud
- Owner: Susan Magnier, Michael Tabor and Derrick Smith; L J Williams et al.
- Trainer: Aidan O'Brien; Robert Hickmott; Gai Waterhouse & Adrian Bott
- Record: 31: 3-4-1
- Earnings: £696,855

Major wins
- Epsom Derby (2020); Neville Sellwood Stakes (2024)
- Last updated on 2 January 2025

Serpentine (foaled 20 March 2017) is a retired Irish Thoroughbred racehorse best known for his win in the 2020 Epsom Derby.

== Background ==
Serpentine is a chestnut gelding with a white blaze and a white sock on his left hind leg bred in Ireland by the Coolmore Stud. He was owned by the Coolmore partners Michael Tabor, Susan Magnier and Derrick Smith. Like many Coolmore horses he was sent into training with Aidan O'Brien at Ballydoyle.

He was sired by Galileo, who won the Derby, Irish Derby and King George VI and Queen Elizabeth Stakes in 2001. Galileo became one of the world's leading stallions, earning his tenth champion sire of Great Britain and Ireland title in 2018. His other progeny include: Frankel, Nathaniel, New Approach, Rip Van Winkle, Found Minding, Love and Ruler of the World. Serpentine's dam Remember When failed to win in six races but was a top-class filly who ran second in the 2010 Epsom Oaks, She was a daughter of the outstanding broodmare Lagrion, making her a half-sister to Dylan Thomas, Homecoming Queen and Queen's Logic.

== Racing career ==
=== 2019: two-year-old season ===
On his only appearance as a two-year-old Serpentine started the 10/1 sixth choice in the betting for a maiden race over eight and a half furlongs on soft ground at Galway Racecourse on 17 September. Ridden by Wayne Lordan he was always racing towards the rear and came home tenth of the eleven runners behind his stablemate Persia, beaten sixteen lengths by the winner.

=== 2020: three-year-old season ===
The 2020 flat racing season in England and Ireland was disrupted by the COVID-19 pandemic and Serpentine did not make his reappearance until 12 June when he contested a maiden over ten furlongs at the Curragh. With Seamie Heffernan in the saddle he started the 100/30 favourite but finished fifth of the eighteen runners behind Galileo Chrome after appearing to be outpaced in the closing stages. Lordan took the ride fifteen days later when the colt started 5/2 favourite for a maiden over the same course and distance. He led from the start, went well clear of his seven opponents at half distance and increased his advantage in the final furlong to win "easily" by nine lengths from Monument Valley.

The 241st running of the Epsom Derby took place a month later than usual, behind closed doors, over 1 1/2 miles at Epsom Racecourse on 4 July. The race was run on good ground in wet, overcast conditions and attracted a field of seventeen runners. Serpentine, ridden by Emmet McNamara, was one of the less fancied of the six horse entry from the O'Brien stable and went off at odds of 25/1 in a field which included: Kameko, English King (winner of the Lingfield Derby Trial), Mogul (Juvenile Stakes), Pyledriver (King Edward VII Stakes), Vatican City (2nd in Irish 2,000 Guineas), Russian Emperor (Hampton Court Stakes), Khalifa Sat (Cocked Hat Stakes), Max Vega (Zetland Stakes) and Mohican Heights (Stonehenge Stakes). Serpentine led from the start, opened up a decisive advantage, accelerated five furlongs out and entered the straight some twelve lengths clear of his rivals. Although his lead steadily diminished in the last quarter mile he never looked to be in any danger of defeat and won by 5 1/2 lengths from Khalifa Sat with Amhran Na Bhfiann taking third place just ahead of Kameko and English King. McNamara, who had not ridden a winner in nine months, commented "I think I got a little bit of a freebie. All I could hear was the horse breathing. He was in a good rhythm, he was relaxed and I couldn't hear a thing around me... I'm not the lightest guy in the world, but thankfully, Aidan knows I'm riding out every day and I'm fit as a fiddle, so when a race like this pops up and he's got a few extra runners, he seems to give me a couple of spins".

After a break of over two months Serpentine returned to the track for the 2400 metres Grand Prix de Paris which was run that year at Longchamp Racecourse on 13 September. Ridden by Christophe Soumillon he started second favourite but after being in contention from the start he was unable to make any significant progress in the closing stages and came home fourth behind his stablemate Mogul. The colt was scheduled to run in the Prix de l'Arc de Triomphe over the same course and distance on 4 October but the O'Brien contingent was withdrawn en masse when four horses failed drug tests, with the results being attributed to a batch of contaminated feed.

At Ascot Racecourse on 17 October Serpentine was ridden by William Buick when he was dropped back in trip and started an 18/1 outsider for the Champion Stakes over ten furlongs. He led for most of the way before being overtaken in the straight and coming home fourth behind Addeybb, Skalleti and Magical.

In the 2020 World's Best Racehorse Rankings, Serpentine was rated on 120, making him the equal 40th best racehorse in the world.

=== 2021: four-year-old season ===
Serpentine raced three times in 2021, without winning or being placed. In the Tattersalls Gold Cup at the Curragh he came seventh of eight runners, 17 1/2 lengths behind winner Helvic Dream. In the Ascot Gold Cup he came eighth of twelve runners, beaten twenty-four lengths by Subjectivist, and in the Goodwood Cup he came sixth of eight runners, beaten ten lengths by Trueshan.

=== 2022: five-year-old season ===
Serpentine was sold to Lloyd Williams and went into training with Robert Hickmott in Australia. Before running in Australia, he was gelded. This was unusual in the circumstances, as Derby winners almost always go on to have a career at stud. After four races where he finished well down the field, Serpentine came second in the Lexus Stakes, which gained him entry to the 2022 Melbourne Cup. He started at 30/1 for the Melbourne Cup and ran his usual front-running race, but weakened from over four furlongs out and finished twentieth of twenty-two runners, ninety-nine lengths behind Gold Trip.

=== 2023: six-year-old season ===
Having been moved from Hickmott to trainers Gai Waterhouse & Adrian Bott, Serpentine won a race in Australia for the first time, beating three rivals in the Robbie Fradd Open Handicap at Eagle Farm Racecourse in Brisbane. In another six starts, he was placed second twice and third once.

=== 2024: seven-year-old season ===
On 30 March 2024, Serpentine won the Group 3 Neville Sellwood Stakes at Rosehill, beating Zeyrek by half a length. He ran in a further eight races, with his best result being second place in the Group 2 Moonee Valley Gold Cup, half a length behind Okita Soushi.

=== 2025: eight-year-old season and retirement ===
On 1 January 2025, Serpentine finished fourteenth of fifteen runners in the Perth Cup. He was retired after the race.

== Pedigree ==
Pedigree of Serpentine (IRE), chestnut gelding, 2017
Sire Galileo (IRE) 1998	Sadler's Wells (USA); 1981	Northern Dancer (CAN)	Nearctic
Sire Galileo (IRE) 1998	Sadler's Wells (USA); 1981	Northern Dancer (CAN)	Natalma (USA)
Sire Galileo (IRE) 1998	Sadler's Wells (USA); 1981	Fairy Bridge	Bold Reason
Sire Galileo (IRE) 1998	Sadler's Wells (USA); 1981	Fairy Bridge	Special
Sire Galileo (IRE) 1998	Urban Sea (USA); 1989	Miswaki	Mr. Prospector
Sire Galileo (IRE) 1998	Urban Sea (USA); 1989	Miswaki	Hopespringseternal
Sire Galileo (IRE) 1998	Urban Sea (USA); 1989	Allegretta (GB)	Lombard (GER)
Sire Galileo (IRE) 1998	Urban Sea (USA); 1989	Allegretta (GB)	Anatevka (GER)
Dam Remember When (IRE) 2007	Danehill Dancer (IRE); 1993	Danehill (USA)	Danzig
Dam Remember When (IRE) 2007	Danehill Dancer (IRE); 1993	Danehill (USA)	Razyana
Dam Remember When (IRE) 2007	Danehill Dancer (IRE); 1993	Mira Andonde (USA)	Sharpen Up (GB)
Dam Remember When (IRE) 2007	Danehill Dancer (IRE); 1993	Mira Andonde (USA)	Lettre d'Amour
Dam Remember When (IRE) 2007	Lagrion (USA); 1989	Diesis (GB)	Sharpen Up
Dam Remember When (IRE) 2007	Lagrion (USA); 1989	Diesis (GB)	Doubly Sure
Dam Remember When (IRE) 2007	Lagrion (USA); 1989	Wrap It Up (IRE)	Mount Hagen (FR)
Dam Remember When (IRE) 2007	Lagrion (USA); 1989	Wrap It Up (IRE)	Doc Nan (USA) (Family 9-c)
