= Martin Dwyer =

English jockey

Personal information
- Born: 28 June 1975 (age 51) Aintree, Liverpool, England
- Occupation: Jockey

Horse racing career
- Sport: Horse racing
- Career wins: 1,543

Major racing wins
- British Classic Races: Oaks Stakes (2003); Derby Stakes (2006); Other major races: Coronation Cup (2021); Dewhurst Stakes (2005); Dubai Sheema Classic (2005); Flying Five Stakes (2014); King's Stand Stakes (2002); Goodwood Cup (2003)

Racing awards
- Lester Awards; Flat Ride of the Year (2003, 2006)

Significant horses
- Casual Look, Persian Punch, Phoenix Reach, Pyledriver, Sir Percy
- Updated on 20 October 2023

Martin Joseph Dwyer (born 28 June 1975 in Aintree, Liverpool, Merseyside) is a retired English jockey who competed in flat racing, winning the 2006 Epsom Derby on Sir Percy and the 2003 Epsom Oaks on Casual Look.

== Career ==
Dwyer, who was born in Liverpool, was apprenticed to trainer Ian Balding in Kingsclere, Hampshire. His first winner was Susquehanna Days at Warwick on 9 July 1993 and his first Group race winner was Halmahera in the Group 3 Cornwallis Stakes in 1997. On 6 June 2003, Dwyer rode Casual Look, trained by Andrew Balding to victory in the Epsom Oaks. It was his first Group 1 win. In 2006 he achieved a second Classic success when Sir Percy, trained by Marcus Tregoning, won the Epsom Derby.

Dwyer spent several winters in India, winning the 2012 Indian Derby on In the Spotlight. His association with India ended in controversy. He received a 56-day ban for not riding a horse on its merits in February 2013. A recording then emerged of a 2010 telephone conversation in which he discussed betting with jockey Paul Mulrennan.

In 2019, Dwyer established a successful partnership with Pyledriver, trained by his father-in-law William Muir. They won the King Edward VII Stakes and Great Voltigeur Stakes in 2020 and the following year won the Coronation Cup, giving Muir (by then joined by co-trainer Chris Grassick) his first Group 1 victory.

Dwyer was injured in a fall while riding out for Brian Meehan in March 2022. He underwent two operations on his knee but the injury left him unable to ride in races and he announced his retirement in July 2022. He said: "I'm proud that I tried my best and was able to achieve more than I ever thought I would do.... I came into racing with no background in the sport, no family members in it, and I worked hard to get to where I did". During a career spanning thirty years, Dwyer rode 1,543 winners in Great Britain with his best season being 2002 with 106 winners. He rode eight Group/Grade 1 wins, and eight Royal Ascot wins.

== Personal life ==
Dwyer is married to Claire Muir and has two children.

== Awards and honours ==
- Lester Awards
  - Flat Ride of the Year in 2003 (on Persian Punch in the Jockey Club Cup)
  - Flat Ride of the Year in 2006 (on Sir Percy in the Epsom Derby)

== Major wins ==
Great Britain

- Coronation Cup – (1) Pyledriver (2021)
- Dewhurst Stakes – (1) – Sir Percy (2005)
- Epsom Derby – (1) – Sir Percy (2006)
- Epsom Oaks – (1) – Casual Look (2003)
- King's Stand Stakes – (1) – Dominica (2002)

Canada

- Canadian International Stakes – (1) – Phoenix Reach (2003)

Hong Kong

- Hong Kong Vase – (1) – Phoenix Reach (2004)

Italy

- Gran Criterium – (1) – Nayarra (2011)

United Arab Emirates

- Dubai Sheema Classic – (1) – Phoenix Reach (2005)

== See also ==
- List of jockeys
