= Tom Marquand =

British jockey

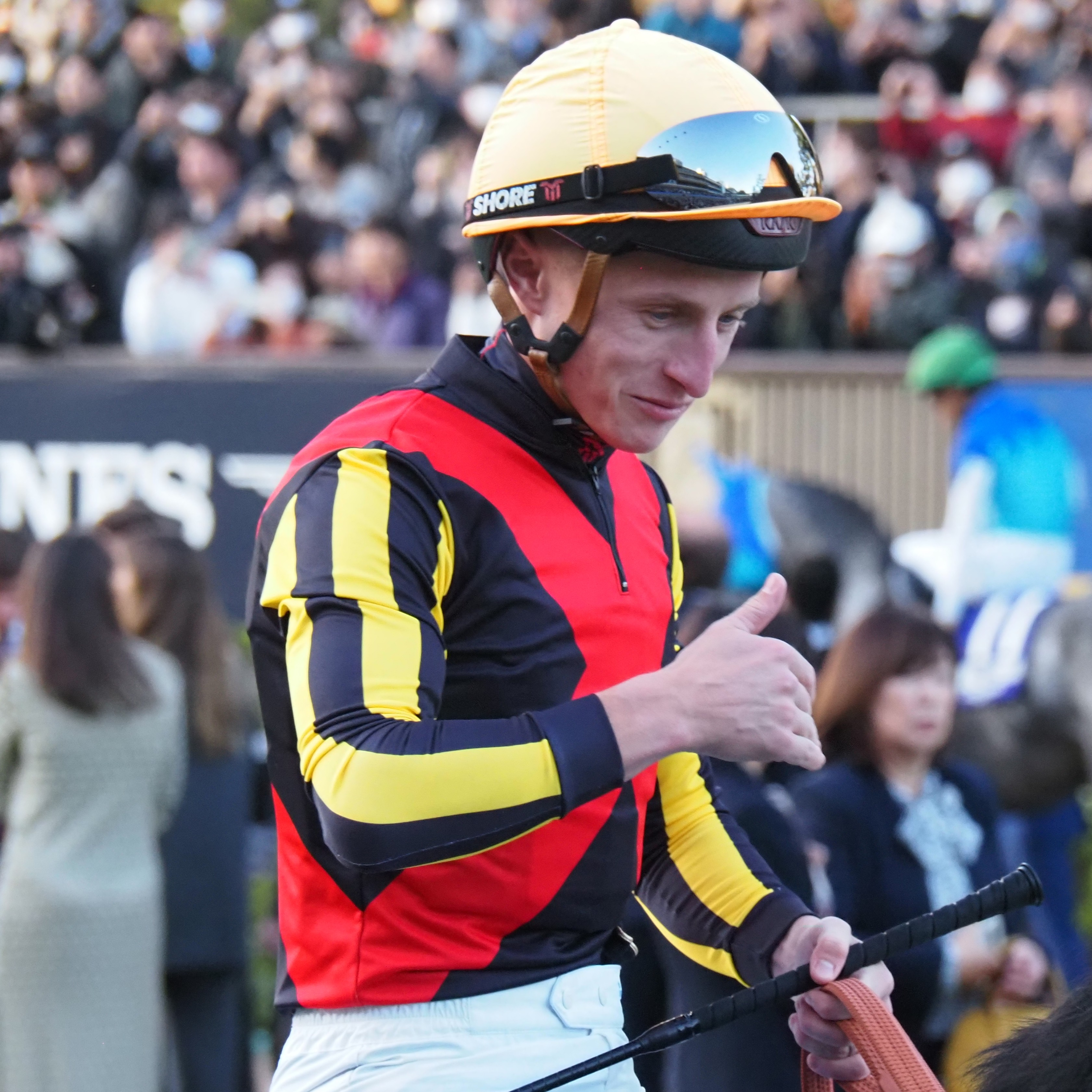

Personal information
- Nationality: British
- Born: 30 March 1998 (age 28)
- Occupation: Flat racing jockey
- Spouse: Hollie Doyle (m. 2022)

Horse racing career
- Sport: Horse racing

Significant horses
- Anna Nerium; Addeybb; Monica Sheriff; Economics; Dubai Honour

Tom Marquand (born 30 March 1998) is a British jockey who competes in flat racing.

== Background ==
Marquand spent his childhood near Cheltenham and, although not from a racing background, grew up around horses. After pony racing and riding out for local trainers, he joined the Wiltshire yard of trainer Richard Hannon as an apprentice at the age of 16.

== Career ==
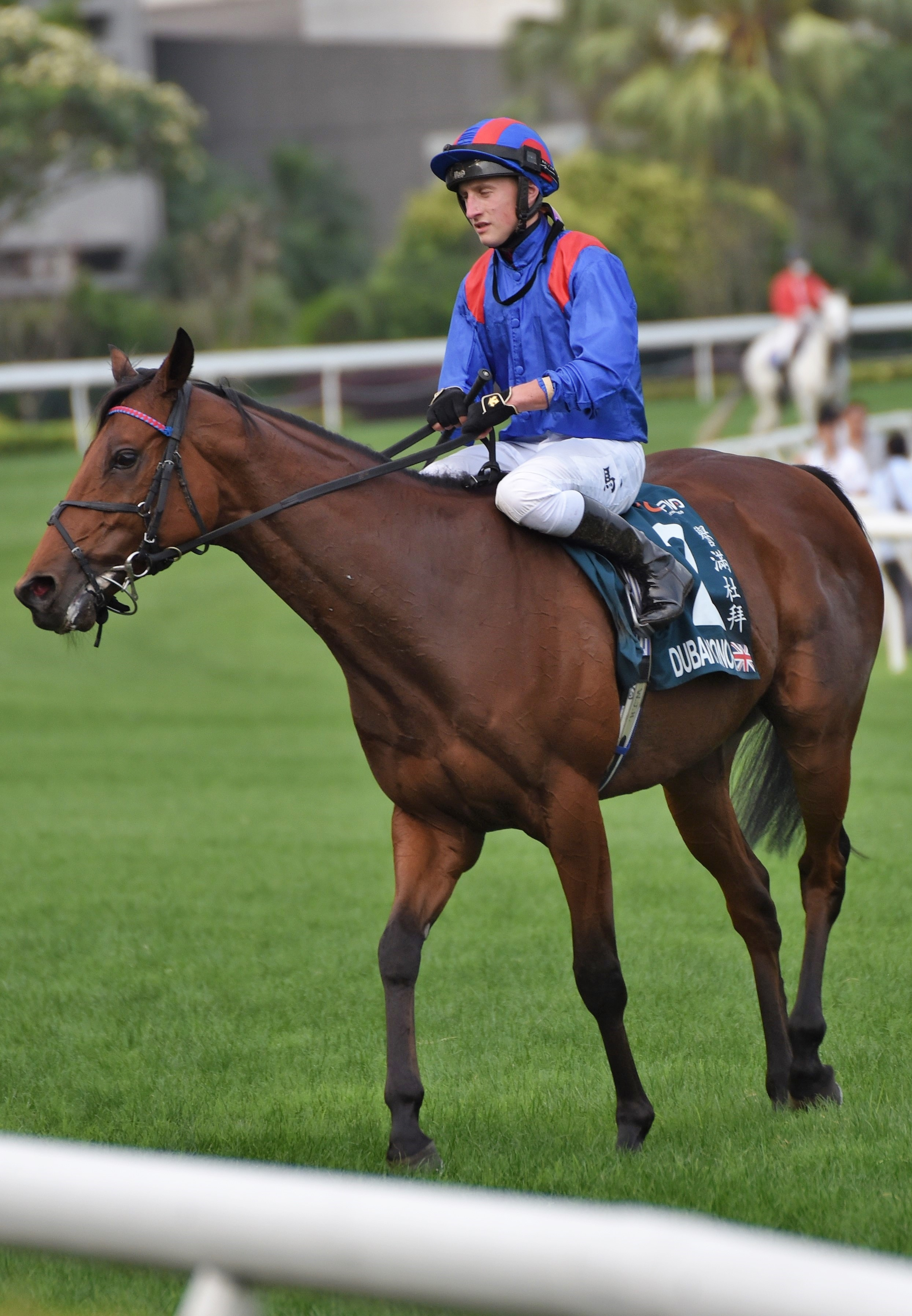
Marquand and Dubai Honour at the 2023 QEII Cup

Marquand rode his first winner in 2014 and was champion apprentice jockey in 2015. That year he reached the finals of the BBC Young Sports Personality of the Year. On 7 September 2017 he rode his first Group race winner (40/1 outsider Anna Nerium in the Group 3 Dick Poole Fillies' Stakes at Salisbury). In 2018 he rode more than 100 winners, including Anna Nerium in another Group 3 race, the Supreme Stakes at Goodwood. Over Christmas and the New Year he spent six weeks in Australia riding for the Sydney trainer John O'Shea. There were two more Group 3 victories in 2019: the Princess Elizabeth Stakes at Epsom Downs on Anna Nerium and the Prix Belle de Nuit at Saint-Cloud, France, on Monica Sheriff. Another trip to Australia in March–April 2020 provided Marquand with a Group 1 double on the William Haggas-trained Addeybb in the Ranvet Stakes and the Queen Elizabeth Stakes. Marquand also had several successes in Group 3 races in Australia and was nicknamed 'Aussie Tom' by Australian racing fans.

On 4 July 2020, Marquand had his first ride in the Epsom Derby. He had ridden English King to win the Lingfield Derby Trial but lost the Derby ride on the fancied runner to Frankie Dettori. Instead he secured a ride on 50/1 outsider Khalifa Sat and finished in second place behind Serpentine.

Marquand's first Classic win came on Galileo Chrome in the St Leger Stakes at Doncaster on 12 September 2020. He had only been given the ride the previous day, when jockey Shane Crosse tested positive for COVID-19. His second Classic win would come in the same race in 2025, having been given the ride on favourite Scandinavia as Aidan O'Brien's first and second jockeys, Ryan Moore and Wayne Lordan, were sidelined through injury and suspension respectively.

Marquand had a career-best 176 winners in Great Britain in 2021, including a Group 1 victory in the July Cup on Starman, trained by Ed Walker. Addeybb provided him with a further Group 1 in Australia when he won the Queen Elizabeth Stakes for the second year in a row. In 2022 there were three Group 1 victories, with Marquand finishing the season in joint second place in the jockeys' championship with his partner Hollie Doyle before the couple set off to ride in Japan for two months, having ridden in Hong Kong the previous two winters.

In February 2023 Marquand was injured in a fall at Randwick soon after arriving in Australia, suffering a concussion and a shoulder injury, but was able to ride Dubai Honour, trained by Haggas, to win the Queen Elizabeth Stakes in April. Back in England, Marquand received another injury when he was kicked on the way to the start at Newmarket on 5 May 2023 and missed rides in the 2000 and 1000 Guineas that weekend. A highlight of the 2023 season was Marquand's victory in the Goodwood Cup when 16/1 outsider Quickthorn, trained by Hughie Morrison, streaked clear of the field in the early stages of the race and never relinquished his lead. He had used similar tactics on Quickthorn to win the Group 2 Lonsdale Cup at York the previous August. After the Goodwood Cup, Marquand said "I've had a bit of fun on him before on some big days and he just loves bowling away.... There was no masterplan. Everybody knows what he is going to do and it's testament to him."

On 4 September 2023 Marquand rode his 1000th winner in Britain. The next day he rode the joint shortest-priced loser in British racing history when 1/25 favourite Doom came second in a two-horse race at Ripon, equalling the record held by Royal Forest (ridden by Gordon Richards) since 1948. (Note: The record was broken in September 2026 by Lewis Edmunds on 1/33 Najidi Storm.) From November to December, he and Doyle again rode in Japan.

== Personal life ==
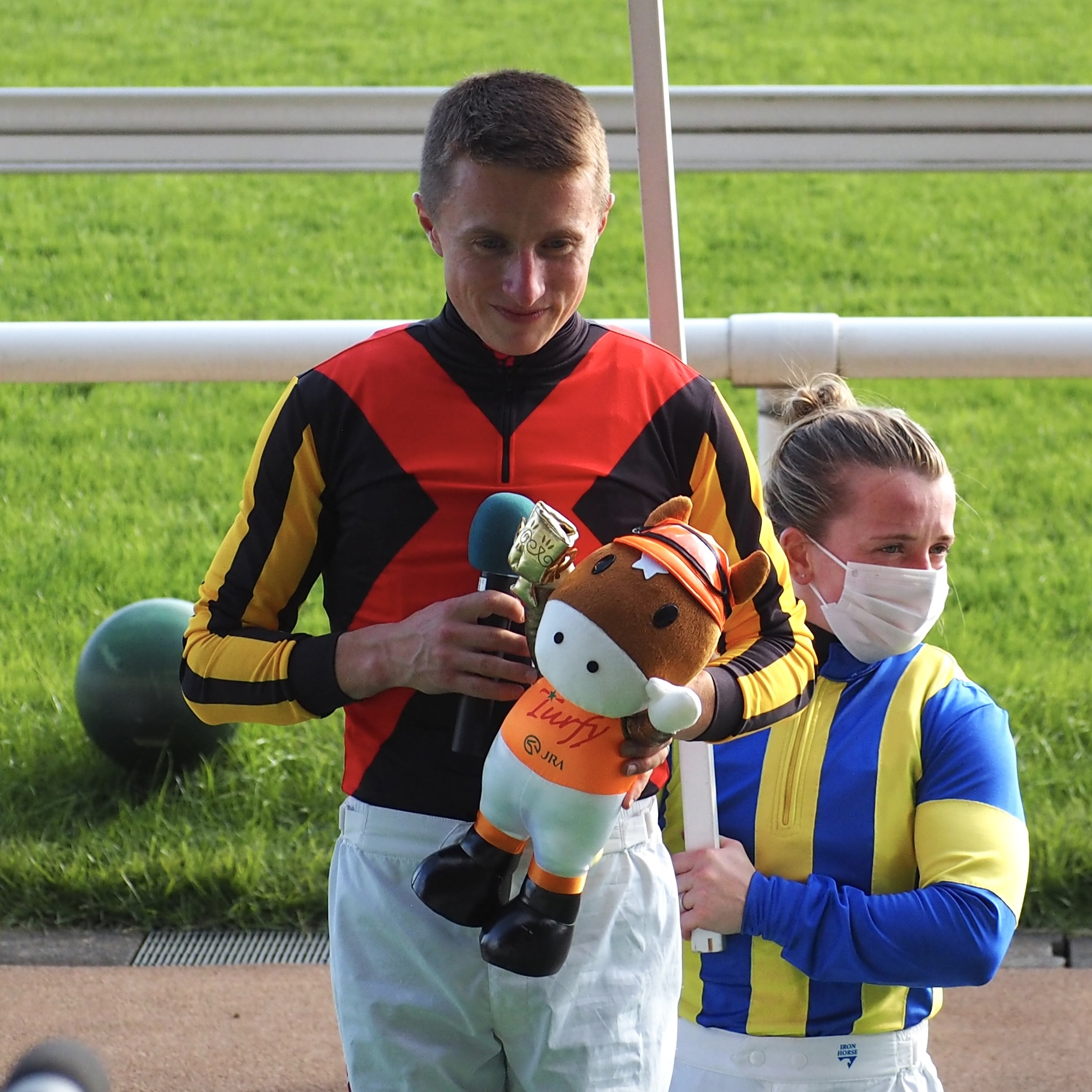
Marquand and Doyle at the ceremony celebrating his first Japanese victory in 2022

Marquand is married to jockey Hollie Doyle. The couple met in their pony racing days, and they were for a time apprentices together at Richard Hannon's yard. They became engaged in 2020 and married on 21 March 2022 in the parish church of the village of Ivington in Herefordshire.

== Major wins ==
(United Kingdom) Great Britain

- Champion Stakes - (1) - Addeybb (2020)
- British Champions Sprint Stakes - (1) - Almeraq (2026)
- St Leger Stakes - (2) - Galileo Chrome (2020), Scandinavia (2025)
- Queen Elizabeth II Stakes - (1) - Bayside Boy (2022)
- July Cup - (1) - Starman (2021)
- Goodwood Cup - (1) - Quickthorn (2023)
- Coronation Stakes - (1) - Porta Fortuna (2024)
- Queen Elizabeth II Jubilee Stakes - (1) - Almeraq (2026)
- Haydock Sprint Cup - (1) - Almeraq (2026)

(Republic of Ireland) Ireland

- Irish Champion Stakes - (1) - Economics (2024)
- Matron Stakes - (1) - Porta Fortuna (2024)
- Tattersalls Gold Cup - (1) - Alenquer (2022)

Australia

- Ranvet Stakes - (1) - Addeybb (2020)
- Queen Elizabeth Stakes (ATC) - (3) - Addeybb (2020, 2021), Dubai Honour (2023)
- Tancred Stakes - (1) - Dubai Honour (2025)

France

- Prix de Royallieu - (1) - Sea La Rosa (2022)
- Grand Prix de Saint-Cloud - (1) - Dubai Honour (2024)
- Prix de l'Abbaye de Longchamp - (1) - Makarova (2024)
- Prix du Cadran - (1) - Caballo De Mar (2025)
- Grand Prix de Paris - (1) - Maltese Cross (2026)

United States

- Breeders' Cup Juvenile Turf Sprint - (1) - Big Evs (2023)

India

- Indian Derby (Local Group 1) - (1) - Fynbos (2026)
