= Golden Fleece Stakes =

Flat horse race in Ireland

- Class: Group 1
- Location: Leopardstown; County Dublin, Ireland
- Inaugurated: 2007
- Race type: Flat / Thoroughbred
- Sponsor: KPMG
- Website: Leopardstown

Race information
- Distance: 1 mile 1 furlong (1,811 metres)
- Surface: Turf
- Track: Left-handed
- Qualification: Two-year-old colts and fillies
- Weight: 9 st 3 lb Allowances; 3 lb for fillies
- Purse: €141,000 (2022); 1st: €88,500

Breeders' Cup Juvenile Turf Trial
2026
Darkness Falls	Jesus Green	Quest For Stars

Previous years
2025
Benvenuto Cellini	Hardy Warrior	Nil Bua Gan Dua
2024
Green Impact	Delacroix	Bernard Shaw
2023
Diego Velazquez	Capulet	Atlantic Coast
2022
Auguste Rodin	Caroline Street	Alder
2021
Atomic Jones	Stone Age	Absolute Ruler

2020-2011
2020
Cadillac	Van Gogh	Reve De Vol
2019
Mogul	Sinawann	Agitare
2018
Madhmoon	Broome	Masaff
2017
Nelson	Kew Gardens	Delano Roosevelt
2016
Landfall	Firey Speech	Douglas Macarthur
2015
Johannes Vermeer	True Solitaire	Sanus Per Aquam
2014
John F Kennedy	Tombelaine	Faithful Creek
2013
Australia	Free Eagle	Kingfisher
2012
Battle Of Marengo	Trading Leather	Dibayani
2011
Tenth Star	Whip Rule	Snowflake Dancer

2010-2007
2010
Zoffany	Stentorian	Free Art
2009
Perfect Symmetry	En Un Clin D'oeil	Bosphorus Queen
2008
Ryehill Dreamer	Vilasol	Glisten
2007
Bruges	Going Public	Minneapolis

The Golden Fleece Stakes is a Group 1 flat horse race in Ireland open to two-year-old thoroughbred colts and fillies. It is run over a distance of 1 mile and 1 furlong (1,811 metres) at Leopardstown in September.

== History ==
The event was first named the Golden Fleece Stakes after Golden Fleece, the Irish-trained winner of The Derby in 1982. It was established in 2007, and was originally contested over 7 furlongs. It initially held Listed status, and took place in late June or early July.

The race was switched to September and extended to a mile in 2012. From this point it was billed as a trial for the Breeders' Cup Juvenile Turf, and known as the Breeders' Cup Juvenile Turf Trial Stakes. It was promoted to Group 3 level in 2013. In 2014 it was renamed the Juvenile Turf Stakes and became part of the Irish Champions Weekend fixture. The word "Turf" was dropped from the title in 2015.

The race was upgraded to Group 1 from 2026 and reverted to its original name. Geldings are excluded from the Golden Fleece Stakes, which will now be run over 1 mile 1 furlong.

== Records ==
Leading jockey (5 wins):

- Joseph O'Brien – Tenth Star (2011), Battle of Marengo (2012), Australia (2013), John F Kennedy (2014), Johannes Vermeer (2015)

Leading trainer (12 wins):

- Aidan O'Brien – Zoffany (2010), Tenth Star (2011), Battle of Marengo (2012), Australia (2013), John F Kennedy (2014), Johannes Vermeer (2015), Nelson (2017), Mogul (2019), Auguste Rodin (2022), Diego Velazquez (2023), Benvenuto Cellini (2025), Darkness Falls (2026)

== Winners ==
Year	Winner	Jockey	Trainer	Time
2007	Bruges	Niall McCullagh	David Myerscough	1:34.60
2008	Ryehill Dreamer	Wayne Lordan	Tommy Stack	1:31.22
2009	Perfect Symmetry ^{[a]}	Keagan Latham	Ger Lyons	1:28.39
2010	Zoffany	Seamie Heffernan	Aidan O'Brien	1:27.89
2011	Tenth Star	Joseph O'Brien	Aidan O'Brien	1:27.96
2012	Battle of Marengo	Joseph O'Brien	Aidan O'Brien	1:38.68
2013	Australia	Joseph O'Brien	Aidan O'Brien	1:40.30
2014	John F Kennedy	Joseph O'Brien	Aidan O'Brien	1:38.44
2015	Johannes Vermeer	Joseph O'Brien	Aidan O'Brien	1:43.99
2016	Landfall	Shane Foley	Ken Condon	1:43.49
2017	Nelson	Donnacha O'Brien	Aidan O'Brien	1:47.35
2018	Madhmoon	Chris Hayes	Kevin Prendergast	1:41.00
2019	Mogul	Ryan Moore	Aidan O'Brien	1:42.59
2020	Cadillac	Shane Foley	Jessica Harrington	1:40.93
2021	Atomic Jones (Note: The 2021 winner Atomic Jones was later exported to Hong Kong and renamed Atomic Beauty)	Colin Keane	Ger Lyons	1:42.75
2022	Auguste Rodin	Ryan Moore	Aidan O'Brien	1:45.25
2023	Diego Velazquez	Ryan Moore	Aidan O'Brien	1:40.46
2024	Green Impact	Shane Foley	Jessica Harrington	1:39.52
2025	Benvenuto Cellini	Christophe Soumillon	Aidan O'Brien	1:42.35
2026	Darkness Falls	Ryan Moore	Aidan O'Brien	1:51.73

^{a} The 2009 running took place at Fairyhouse.

== See also ==
- Horse racing in Ireland
- List of Irish flat horse races
