= Eddie Ahern =

Irish professional jockey

Personal information
- Born: 6 December 1977 (age 48) County Tipperary, Ireland
- Occupation: Jockey

Horse racing career
- Sport: Horse racing
- Career wins: 1,252 (UK and Ireland only); UK: 1,031, Ireland: 221

Major racing wins
- UK and Ireland Group 1 races Irish St. Leger (2011); Moyglare Stud Stakes (1999); Other notable races Northumberland Plate (2010); Watership Down Stud Sales Race (2005)

Racing awards
- Irish flat racing Champion Apprentice 1997

Significant horses
- Duncan, Overturn

Eddie Ahern (born 6 December 1977) is an Irish professional jockey, currently banned from racing for ten years by the British Horseracing Authority on charges of corruption. He was champion apprentice in Ireland in 1997.

== Career ==
Ahern had his first ride in his native Ireland in 1994. From then until 2001, he raced mainly in Ireland, his best season being 2000 when he picked up 46 wins. Thereafter, he has mainly ridden in the UK from a base in Newmarket (although his first ride in the UK had been as far back as 1998). His career peak to date came in 2006 when he rode 140 winners. This included a treble at combined odds of 293-1 on day two of the Glorious Goodwood meeting. At that time he was picking up more than 1,000 rides per year. As of May 2013, when he was banned from racing for ten years, Ahern had won a total of 1,252 races in the UK and Ireland, from a total of 11,511.

In December 2007, Ahern was banned from racing for 3 months for a whip offence. While serving the ban, he won the Hayes Golden Button Challenge, a cross-country event run by Ledbury Hunt on New Year's Eve.

Another controversy occurred before a race on 16 October 2008. Ahern was still giving a talk in the corporate hospitality box at Newmarket when the riders were due in for weighing. Consequently, he missed the ride on Charlie Farnsbarns in the Group 3 Darley Stakes. The horse, a 50/1 chance, was instead ridden by Ryan Moore, who won. Ahern's error cost him £3,500 in missed prize money and a £140 fine.

== Ban for race fixing ==
In May 2013, Ahern received a ten-year ban from the British Horseracing Authority for his actions in five races which took place between September 2010 and February 2011. He was accused of passing on information about these races to the former Chelsea and West Bromwich Albion footballer, Neil Clement, to use for lay betting (that is, betting on a horse to lose) on betting exchanges. He was also accused of preventing his horse from obtaining the best possible position, an offence under the Rules of Racing. Rumours about Ahern's alleged actions in this regard had already led to him being nicknamed "Betfair Eddie" by users of betting exchange Betfair.

At the trial, he was found guilty of conspiring to commit a corrupt or fraudulent practice, intentionally failing to ensure a horse was ridden on its merits and of passing information for reward. His co-defendant, Clement, was found guilty of conspiring to commit a corrupt or fraudulent practice, placing a lay bet on a horse which he then owned and failure to provide phone records to the inquiry.

Two other associates - former racehorse owner Michael Turl, James Clutterbuck, son of and assistant to Newmarket trainer Ken Clutterbuck - had been disqualified the previous month for conspiring with Clement. A further two individuals - Martin Raymond and Paul Hill - were also charged in relation to one of the races.
