= Andrew Balding =

British racehorse trainer

Andrew Matthews Balding (born 29 December 1972) is a British racehorse trainer based at Park House Stables, Kingsclere, Hampshire.

== Biography ==
Balding attended Caldicott School, a boys' preparatory school, and Radley College, a public school. He became a licensed trainer in January 2003, when he succeeded his father Ian Balding.

His elder sister is Clare Balding. His maternal grandfather was the trainer Peter Hastings-Bass and his maternal uncle William Hastings-Bass, 17th Earl of Huntingdon, former trainer to Queen Elizabeth II. His maternal grandmother Priscilla Hastings is descended from the Earls of Derby. His paternal grandfather was polo player Gerald Barnard Balding Sr.

Balding has been married to Anna-Lisa since 15 July 2005. They have three children.

Notable horses trained by Balding include Casual Look, the winner of the Epsom Oaks in 2003. The win led to an emotional post-race interview with his sister.

In 2014, the Baldings' Park House Stables were visited by Irish president Michael D. Higgins as part of his state visit to the UK. The Baldings were invited to ride in the King's procession at Royal Ascot 2023.

== Major wins ==
(United Kingdom) Great Britain

- 2000 Guineas - (2) - Kameko (2020), Chaldean (2023)
- British Champions Fillies and Mares Stakes - (2) - Kalpana (2024, 2025)
- British Champions Long Distance Cup - (1) - Mount Atlas (2026)
- British Champions Sprint Stakes - (1) - Donjuan Triumphant (2019)
- Cheveley Park Stakes - (1) - Alcohol Free (2020)
- City of York Stakes - (1) Never So Brave (2025)
- Coronation Stakes - (1) - Alcohol Free (2021)
- Dewhurst Stakes - (2) - Chaldean (2022), Gewan (2025)
- Epsom Oaks - (1) - Casual Look (2003)
- Falmouth Stakes - (1) - Blue Bolt (2026)
- International Stakes -(1) Item (2026)
- King George VI and Queen Elizabeth Stakes - (1) - Kalpana (2026)
- July Cup - (1) - Alcohol Free (2022)
- Sun Chariot Stakes - (1) - Blue Bolt (2026)
- Sussex Stakes - (2) - Here Comes When (2017), Alcohol Free (2021)
- Vertem Futurity Trophy - (2) - Elm Park (2014), Kameko (2019)
- Yorkshire Oaks - (1) Kalpana (2026)

France

- Prix Rothschild - (1) - Blue Bolt (2026)

Australia

- LKS Mackinnon Stakes - (1) - Side Glance (2013)

Canada

- Canadian International Stakes - (1) - Phoenix Reach (2003)
- E. P. Taylor Stakes - (1) - Blond Me (2017)
- Summer Stakes - (1) New Century (2024)

Hong Kong

- Hong Kong Vase - (1) - Phoenix Reach (2004)

United Arab Emirates

- Dubai Sheema Classic - (1) - Phoenix Reach (2005)

== See also ==
- List of significant families in British horse racing
