= 2021 British Champions Series =

11th edition of the horse racing series comprising 35 of the UK's top flat races

- Sport: Horse racing
- Duration: 1 May – 16 October 2021

Leading Horse
- Highest Rated: Adayar / St Mark's Basilica
- Rating: 127

Leading Jockey
- Winner: Frankie Dettori
- Win / 2nd / 3rd: 7 / 1 / 2

Leading Trainer
- Winner: Aidan O'Brien
- Win / 2nd / 3rd: 5 / 4 / 11

Seasons
- ← 2020 2022 →

The 2021 British Champions Series, sponsored by QIPCO, was the 11th edition of the horse racing series comprising 35 of the UK's top flat races.

The series began with the 2,000 Guineas at Newmarket on 1 May, and ended on British Champions Day at Ascot on 16 October.

== Results ==
The series was split into five categories: Sprint, Mile, Middle Distance, Long Distance and Fillies & Mares. Each category included seven races.

=== Sprint ===
Race	Date	Distance	Course	1st	2nd	3rd
King's Stand Stakes	15 June	5 furlongs	Ascot	Oxted; Cieren Fallon – Roger Teal	Arecibo; Jamie Spencer – Robert Cowell	Extravagant Kid; Frankie Dettori – Brendan Walsh
Commonwealth Cup	18 June	6 furlongs	Ascot	Campanelle (Note: Dragon Symbol finished the race in first place, with Campanelle second, but following a stewards' enquiry the first two places were reversed and Campanelle was declared the winner.); Frankie Dettori – Wesley Ward	Dragon Symbol; Oisin Murphy – Archie Watson	Measure Of Magic; Ben Coen – Johnny Murtagh
Diamond Jubilee Stakes	19 June	6 furlongs	Ascot	Dream Of Dreams; Ryan Moore – Michael Stoute	Glen Shiel; Hollie Doyle – Archie Watson	Art Power; Silvestre de Sousa – Tim Easterby
July Cup	10 July	6 furlongs	Newmarket	Starman; Tom Marquand – Ed Walker	Dragon Symbol; Oisin Murphy – Archie Watson	Oxted; Cieren Fallon – Roger Teal
Nunthorpe Stakes	20 August	5 furlongs	York	Winter Power; Silvestre de Sousa – Tim Easterby	Emaraaty Ana; Andrea Atzeni – Kevin Ryan	Dragon Symbol; Oisin Murphy – Archie Watson
Sprint Cup	4 September	6 furlongs	Haydock	Emaraaty Ana; Andrea Atzeni – Kevin Ryan	Starman; Tom Marquand – Ed Walker	Chil Chil; David Probert – Andrew Balding
British Champions; Sprint Stakes	16 October	6 furlongs	Ascot	Creative Force; William Buick – Charlie Appleby	Glen Shiel; Hollie Doyle – Archie Watson	Minzaal; Jim Crowley – Owen Burrows

=== Mile ===
Race	Date	Distance	Course	1st	2nd	3rd
2,000 Guineas	1 May	1 mile	Newmarket	Poetic Flare; Kevin Manning – Jim Bolger	Master Of The Seas; William Buick – Charlie Appleby	Lucky Vega; Shane Foley – Jessica Harrington
Lockinge Stakes	15 May	1 mile	Newbury	Palace Pier; Frankie Dettori – John & Thady Gosden	Lady Bowthorpe; Oisin Murphy – William Jarvis	Top Rank; P J McDonald – James Tate
Queen Anne Stakes	15 June	1 mile	Ascot	Palace Pier; Frankie Dettori – John & Thady Gosden	Lope Y Fernandez; Seamie Heffernan – Aidan O'Brien	Sir Busker; Oisin Murphy – William Knight
St James's Palace Stakes	15 June	1 mile	Ascot	Poetic Flare; Kevin Manning – Jim Bolger	Lucky Vega; Shane Foley – Jessica Harrington	Battleground; Ryan Moore – Aidan O'Brien
Sussex Stakes	28 July	1 mile	Goodwood	Alcohol Free; Oisin Murphy – Andrew Balding	Poetic Flare; Kevin Manning – Jim Bolger	Snow Lantern; Jamie Spencer – Richard Hannon
Sun Chariot Stakes	2 October	1 mile	Newmarket	Saffron Beach; William Buick – Jane Chapple-Hyam	Mother Earth; Ryan Moore – Aidan O'Brien	Dreamloper; Kieran Shoemark – Ed Walker
Queen Elizabeth II Stakes	16 October	1 mile	Ascot	Baaeed; Jim Crowley – William Haggas	Palace Pier; Frankie Dettori – John & Thady Gosden	Lady Bowthorpe; Kieran Shoemark – William Jarvis

=== Middle Distance ===
Race	Date	Distance	Course	1st	2nd	3rd
Coronation Cup	4 June	1 mile 4 furlongs	Newmarket	Pyledriver; Martin Dwyer – William Muir & Chris Grassick	Al Aasy; Jim Crowley – William Haggas	Japan; Ryan Moore – Aidan O'Brien
Epsom Derby	5 June	1 mile 4 furlongs	Epsom	Adayar; Adam Kirby – Charlie Appleby	Mojo Star; David Egan – Richard Hannon	Hurricane Lane; William Buick – Charlie Appleby
Prince of Wales's Stakes	16 June	1 mile 2 furlongs	Ascot	Love; Ryan Moore – Aidan O'Brien	Audarya; William Buick – James Fanshawe	Armory; Seamie Heffernan – Aidan O'Brien
Eclipse Stakes	3 July	1 mile 2 furlongs	Sandown	St Mark's Basilica; Ryan Moore – Aidan O'Brien	Addeybb; Tom Marquand – William Haggas	Mishriff; David Egan – John & Thady Gosden
King George VI & Queen Elizabeth Stakes	24 July	1 mile 4 furlongs	Ascot	Adayar; William Buick – Charlie Appleby	Mishriff; David Egan – John & Thady Gosden	Love; Ryan Moore – Aidan O'Brien
International Stakes	18 August	1 mile 2½ furlongs	York	Mishriff; David Egan – John & Thady Gosden	Alenquer; Tom Marquand – William Haggas	Love; Ryan Moore – Aidan O'Brien
Champion Stakes	16 October	1 mile 2 furlongs	Ascot	Sealiway; Mickael Barzalona – Cedric Rossi	Dubai Honour; James Doyle – William Haggas	Mac Swiney; Kevin Manning – Jim Bolger

=== Long Distance ===
Race	Date	Distance	Course	1st	2nd	3rd
Yorkshire Cup	14 May	1 mile 6 furlongs	York	Spanish Mission; William Buick – Andrew Balding	Santiago; Ryan Moore – Aidan O'Brien	Sir Ron Priestley; Franny Norton – Mark Johnston
Ascot Gold Cup	17 June	2 miles 4 furlongs	Ascot	Subjectivist; Joe Fanning – Mark Johnston	Princess Zoe; Joey Sheridan – Anthony Mullins	Spanish Mission; William Buick – Andrew Balding
Goodwood Cup	27 July	2 miles	Goodwood	Trueshan; Hollie Doyle – Alan King	Away He Goes; Jim Crowley – Ismail Mohammed	Sir Ron Priestley; Franny Norton – Mark Johnston
Lonsdale Cup	20 August	2 miles ½ furlong	York	Stradivarius; Frankie Dettori – John & Thady Gosden	Spanish Mission; William Buick – Andrew Balding	The Grand Visir; Richard Kingscote – Ian Williams
Doncaster Cup	10 September	2 miles 2 furlongs	Doncaster	Stradivarius; Frankie Dettori – John & Thady Gosden	Alerta Roja; Luke Morris – Mark Prescott	Nayef Road; Andrea Atzeni – Mark Johnston
St Leger Stakes	11 September	1 mile 6½ furlongs	Doncaster	Hurricane Lane; William Buick – Charlie Appleby	Mojo Star; Rossa Ryan – Richard Hannon	The Mediterranean; Wayne Lordan – Aidan O'Brien
British Champions; Long Distance Cup	16 October	2 miles	Ascot	Trueshan; Hollie Doyle – Alan King	Tashkhan; Ben Robinson – Brian Ellison	Stradivarius; Frankie Dettori – John & Thady Gosden

=== Fillies & Mares ===
Race	Date	Distance	Course	1st	2nd	3rd
1,000 Guineas	2 May	1 mile	Newmarket	Mother Earth; Frankie Dettori – Aidan O'Brien	Saffron Beach; Adam Kirby – Jane Chapple-Hyam	Fev Rover; Paul Hanagan – Richard Fahey
Epsom Oaks	4 June	1 mile 4 furlongs	Epsom	Snowfall; Frankie Dettori – Aidan O'Brien	Mystery Angel; Ben Curtis – George Boughey	Divinely; Seamie Heffernan – Aidan O'Brien
Coronation Stakes	18 June	1 mile	Ascot	Alcohol Free; Oisin Murphy – Andrew Balding	Snow Lantern; Sean Levey – Richard Hannon	Mother Earth; Ryan Moore – Aidan O'Brien
Falmouth Stakes	9 July	1 mile	Newmarket	Snow Lantern; Sean Levey – Richard Hannon	Mother Earth; Ryan Moore – Aidan O'Brien	Alcohol Free; Oisin Murphy – Andrew Balding
Nassau Stakes	29 July	1 mile 2 furlongs	Goodwood	Lady Bowthorpe; Kieran Shoemark – William Jarvis	Zeyaadah; Jim Crowley – Roger Varian	Joan Of Arc; Ryan Moore – Aidan O'Brien
Yorkshire Oaks	19 August	1 mile 4 furlongs	York	Snowfall; Ryan Moore – Aidan O'Brien	Albaflora; Rossa Ryan – Ralph Beckett	La Joconde; Hollie Doyle – Aidan O'Brien
British Champions; Fillies & Mares Stakes	16 October	1 mile 4 furlongs	Ascot	Eshaada; Jim Crowley – Roger Varian	Albaflora; Rossa Ryan – Ralph Beckett	Snowfall; Ryan Moore – Aidan O'Brien

== See also ==
- 2021 Breeders' Cup Challenge series
- 2021 Epsom Derby
