= 2021 Epsom Derby =

242nd running of the Epsom Derby horse race

- Epsom Derby
- Location: Epsom Downs Racecourse
- Date: 5 June 2021
- Winning horse: Adayar
- Starting price: 16/1
- Jockey: Adam Kirby
- Trainer: Charlie Appleby
- Owner: Godolphin
- Conditions: Good to Soft

Epsom Derby 2021
1-2-3
| Adayar | Mojo Star | Hurricane Lane |

Also Ran
4-5-6
Mac Swiney | Third Realm | One Ruler
7-8-9
Bolshoi Ballet | Youth Spirit | John Leeper
10-11
Gear Up | Southern Lights | 11 Ran

The 2021 Epsom Derby was the 242nd annual running of the Derby horse race and took place at Epsom Downs Racecourse on 5 June 2021. The race was sponsored for the first time by the online car-dealer Cazoo.

The winner was Godolphin's bay colt Adayar, ridden by Adam Kirby and trained at Newmarket by Charlie Appleby. Godolphin and Appleby were winning the race for the second time, having taken the prize with Masar in 2018.

== Build-up ==
Attendance was limited to 4,000 owing to government restrictions in response to the COVID-19 pandemic. The race took place after a period of hot, dry weather and the course officials resorted to watering the course to avoid unsuitably firm ground.

The race attracted 19 entrants at the five-day declaration stage, including three previous Group 1 winners, namely Mac Swiney, Van Gogh and Gear Up. The other contenders included Bolshoi Ballet (Derrinstown Stud Derby Trial), Hurricane Lane (Dante Stakes), Youth Sprit (Chester Vase), Third Realm (Lingfield Derby Trial), Lone Eagle (Cocked Hat Stakes), High Definistion (Beresford Stakes), One Ruler (Autumn Stakes), John Leeper (Fairway Stakes) and Mohaafeth (Newmarket Stakes). There were ten entries from Ireland (six trained by Aidan O'Brien), nine from the United Kingdom (three trained by Charlie Appleby and none from continental Europe. The prospective field included five of the top six colts rated in the 8f+ category of the official classification of European two-year-olds for 2020, namely Mac Swiney, High Definition, Van Gogh, One Ruler and Gear Up.

On Wednesday 2 June Aidan O'Brien announced that Bolshoi Ballet would probably be his only runner in the race and that his five other entries, including the second favourite High Definition, would be directed to alternative targets. As O'Brien suggested High Definition, Kyprios, Sir Lamorak, The Mediterranean and Van Gogh were withdrawn from the race on 3 June. The other absentees from the final field of 12 were Lone Eagle and Seattle Sound. On the day of the race Mohaafeth was announced as a non-runner on account of the unsuitable ground conditions.

== Race card ==
| No | Draw | Horse | Weight (st–lb) | Jockey | Trainer | Owner |
|---|---|---|---|---|---|---|
| 1 | 1 | Adayar | 9–0 | Adam Kirby | Charlie Appleby | Godolphin |
| 2 | 9 | Bolshoi Ballet | 9–0 | Ryan Moore | Aidan O'Brien (IRE) | Tabor, Smith, Magnier |
| 3 | 6 | Gear Up | 9–0 | Ben Curtis | Mark Johnston | Teme Valley |
| 4 | 5 | Hurricane Lane | 9–0 | William Buick | Charlie Appleby | Godolphin |
| 5 | 12 | John Leeper | 9–0 | Frankie Dettori | Ed Dunlop | Anamoine Ltd |
| 6 | 8 | Mac Swiney | 9–0 | Kevin Manning | Jim Bolger (IRE) | Jackie Bolger |
| 7 | 4 | Mohaafeth | 9–0 | Jim Crowley | William Haggas | Shadwell Estate |
| 8 | 10 | Mojo Star | 9–0 | David Egan | Richard Hannon Jr. | Amo Racing Ltd |
| 9 | 11 | One Ruler | 9–0 | James Doyle | Charlie Appleby | Godolphin |
| 10 | 3 | Southern Lights | 9–0 | Declan McDonogh | Joseph Patrick O'Brien (IRE) | Aquis Racing & Al Mamoura Partnership |
| 11 | 2 | Third Realm | 9–0 | Andrea Atzeni | Roger Varian | Mohammed Obaid Al Maktoum |
| 12 | 7 | Youth Spirit | 9–0 | Tom Marquand | Andrew Balding | Ahmad Al Shaikh |

Trainers are based in Great Britain unless indicated.

== Full result ==
| | Dist * | Horse | Jockey | Trainer | SP |
| 1 | | Adayar | Adam Kirby | Charlie Appleby | 16/1 |
| 2 | 4½ | Mojo Star | David Egan | Richard Hannon Jr. | 50/1 |
| 3 | 3¼ | Hurricane Lane | William Buick | Charlie Appleby | 6/1 |
| 4 | 3¼ | Mac Swiney | Kevin Manning | Jim Bolger (IRE) | 8/1 |
| 5 | nk | Third Realm | Andrea Atzeni | Roger Varian | 14/1 |
| 6 | 3 | One Ruler | James Doyle | Charlie Appleby | 17/2 |
| 7 | 2¾ | Bolshoi Ballet | Ryan Moore | Aidan O'Brien (IRE) | 11/8 fav |
| 8 | 2 | Youth Spirit | Tom Marquand | Andrew Balding | 25/1 |
| 9 | 1¼ | John Leeper | Frankie Dettori | Ed Dunlop | 8/1 |
| 10 | ¾ | Gear Up | Ben Curtis | Mark Johnston | 50/1 |
| 11 | 21 | Southern Lights | Declan McDonogh | Joseph Patrick O'Brien (IRE) | 33/1 |

Winning time: 2 min 36.85 sec

* The distances between the horses are shown in lengths or shorter; nse = nose; hd = head.
† Trainers are based in Great Britain unless indicated.

== Form analysis ==
=== Two-year-old races ===
Notable runs by the future Derby participants as two-year-olds in 2020

- Gear Up – 1st in Acomb Stakes, 1st in Criterium de Saint-Cloud
- Mac Swiney – 1st in Vertem Futurity Trophy, 1st in Futurity Stakes
- One Ruler – 1st in Autumn Stakes, 2nd in Vertem Futurity Trophy, 3rd in Flying Scotsman Stakes
- Youth Spirit – 3rd in Vintage Stakes

=== Road to Epsom ===
Early-season appearances in 2021 and trial races prior to running in the Derby:

- Adayar – 2nd in Sandown Classic Trial, 2nd in Lingfield Derby Trial
- Bolshoi Ballet – 1st in Ballysax Stakes, 1st in Derrinstown Stud Derby Trial
- Hurricane Lane – 1st in Dante Stakes
- John Leeper – 1st in Fairway Stakes
- Mohaafeth – 1st in Newmarket Stakes
- Mac Swiney – 1st in Irish 2000 Guineas
- Third Realm – 1st in Lingfield Derby Trial
- Youth Spirit – 1st in Chester Vase

=== Subsequent Group 1 wins ===
Group 1 / Grade I victories after running in the Derby:

- Adayar - King George VI and Queen Elizabeth Stakes (2021)
- Bolshoi Ballet – Belmont Derby (2021), Sword Dancer Stakes (2023)
- Hurricane Lane – Irish Derby (2021), Grand Prix de Paris (2021), St Leger Stakes (2021)

== See also ==
- 2021 British Champions Series
