= 2021 World's Best Racehorse Rankings =

The 2021 World's Best Racehorse Rankings, sponsored by Longines was the 2021 edition of the World's Best Racehorse Rankings. It was an assessment of Thoroughbred racehorses issued by the International Federation of Horseracing Authorities (IFHA) on 25 January 2022. It included horses aged three or older which competed in flat races during 2021. It was open to all horses irrespective of where they raced or where they were trained.

== Rankings for 2021 ==
- For a detailed guide to this table, see below.

Rank	Rating	Horse	Age	Sex	Trained	Surface	Cat.
1	129	Knicks Go (USA)	5	H	USA	Dirt	I
2	127	Adayar (IRE)	3	C	GB	Turf	L
2	127	Mishriff (IRE)	4	C	GB	Turf	I
2	127	St Mark's Basilica (FR)	3	C	IRE	Turf	I
5	126	Contrail (JPN)	4	C	JPN	Turf	L
6	125	Baaeed (GB)	3	C	GB	Turf	M
6	125	Golden Sixty (AUS)	6	G	HK	Turf	M
6	125	Palace Pier (GB)	4	C	GB	Turf	M
6	125	Torquator Tasso (GER)	4	C	GER	Turf	L
10	124	Efforia (JPN)	3	C	JPN	Turf	I, L
10	124	Flightline (USA)	3	C	USA	Dirt	S
10	124	Life Is Good (USA)	3	C	USA	Dirt	M
10	124	Medina Spirit (USA)	3	C	USA	Dirt	I, M
10	124	Nature Strip (AUS)	7	G	AUS	Turf	S
15	123	Essential Quality (USA)	3	C	USA	Dirt	I, L
15	123	Glory Vase (JPN)	5	H	JPN	Turf	L
15	123	Hurricane Lane (IRE)	3	C	GB	Turf	L
15	123	Sealiway (FR)	3	C	FR	Turf	I
15	123	Subjectivist (GB)	4	C	GB	Turf	E
15	123	Verry Elleegant (NZ)	6	M	AUS	Turf	E
21	122	Domestic Spending (GB)	4	G	USA	Turf	I
21	122	Hot Rod Charlie (USA)	3	C	USA	Dirt	M
21	122	Incentivise (AUS)	5	G	AUS	Turf	L
21	122	Jackie's Warrior (USA)	3	C	USA	Dirt	S
21	122	Mystic Guide (USA)	4	C	USA	Dirt	I
21	122	Poetic Flare (IRE)	3	C	IRE	Turf	M, I
27	121	Authority (JPN)	4	C	JPN	Turf	L
27	121	Charlatan (USA)	4	C	USA	Dirt	M
27	121	Deep Bond (JPN)	4	C	JPN	Turf	L
27	121	Dubai Honour (IRE)	3	G	GB	Turf	I
27	121	Eduardo (AUS)	8	G	AUS	Turf	S
27	121	Golden Pal (USA)	3	C	USA	Turf	S
27	121	Mandaloun (USA)	3	C	USA	Dirt	I, M
27	121	Masked Crusader (AUS)	5	G	AUS	Turf	S
27	121	Zaaki (GB)	6	G	AUS	Turf	M
36	120	Addeybb (IRE)	7	G	GB	Turf	I
36	120	Chrono Genesis (JPN)	5	M	JPN	Turf	L
36	120	Exultant (IRE)	7	G	HK	Turf	M
36	120	Gran Alegria (JPN)	5	M	JPN	Turf	M
36	120	Lord North (IRE)	5	G	GB	Turf	M
36	120	Midnight Bourbon (USA)	3	C	USA	Dirt	I
36	120	Monomoy Girl (USA)	6	M	USA	Dirt	M
36	120	Pyledriver (GB)	4	C	GB	Turf	L
36	120	Shahryar (JPN)	3	C	JPN	Turf	L
36	120	Skalleti (FR)	6	G	FR	Turf	I
36	120	Snowfall (JPN)	3	F	IRE	Turf	L
36	120	State Of Rest (IRE)	3	C	IRE	Turf	I
36	120	Tarnawa (IRE)	5	M	IRE	Turf	I, L
36	120	T O Keynes (JPN)	4	C	JPN	Dirt	M
36	120	Trueshan (FR)	5	G	GB	Turf	E
36	120	Yibir (GB)	3	G	GB	Turf	L
52	119	Al Aasy (IRE)	4	G	GB	Turf	L
52	119	Alcohol Free (IRE)	3	F	GB	Turf	M
52	119	Aloha West (USA)	4	C	USA	Dirt	S
52	119	Anamoe (AUS)	3	C	AUS	Turf	I
52	119	Art Collector (USA)	4	C	USA	Dirt	M
52	119	Colonel Liam (USA)	4	C	USA	Turf	M
52	119	Do It Again (SAF)	7	G	SAF	Turf	L
52	119	Dr Schivel (USA)	3	C	USA	Dirt	S
52	119	Lone Eagle (IRE)	3	C	GB	Turf	L
52	119	Max Player (USA)	4	C	USA	Dirt	I
52	119	Mugatoo (IRE)	6	G	AUS	Turf	M
52	119	Rainbow Bridge (SAF)	7	G	SAF	Turf	I
52	119	Schnell Meister (GER)	3	C	JPN	Turf	M
52	119	Starman (GB)	4	C	GB	Turf	S
52	119	Stella Veloce (JPN)	3	C	JPN	Turf	L
52	119	Suesa (IRE)	3	F	FR	Turf	S
52	119	Village King (ARG)	7	H	ARG	Turf	L
52	119	World Premiere (JPN)	5	H	JPN	Turf	E
70	118	Alpinista (GB)	4	F	GB	Turf	L
70	118	Broome (IRE)	5	H	IRE	Turf	L
70	118	Creative Force (IRE)	3	G	GB	Turf	S
70	118	Dalasan (AUS)	5	H	AUS	Turf	I
70	118	Danon Kingly (JPN)	5	H	JPN	Turf	M
70	118	Danon The Kid (JPN)	3	C	JPN	Turf	M
70	118	Dream of Dreams (IRE)	7	G	GB	Turf	S
70	118	Gamine (USA)	4	F	USA	Dirt	S
70	118	Home Affairs (AUS)	3	C	AUS	Turf	S
70	118	Indy Champ (JPN)	6	H	JPN	Turf	M
70	118	Lei Papale (JPN)	4	F	JPN	Turf	I
70	118	Letruska (USA)	5	M	USA	Dirt	M
70	118	Love (IRE)	4	F	IRE	Turf	I, L
70	118	Loves Only You (JPN)	5	M	JPN	Turf	I, L
70	118	Mac Swiney (IRE)	3	C	IRE	Turf	M, I
70	118	Mare Australis (IRE)	4	C	FR	Turf	I
70	118	Maxfield (USA)	4	C	USA	Dirt	M
70	118	More Than This (GB)	5	G	HK	Turf	M
70	118	Order of Australia (IRE)	4	C	IRE	Turf	M
70	118	Pixie Knight (JPN)	3	C	JPN	Turf	S
70	118	Real World (IRE)	4	C	GB	Turf	M
70	118	Rombauer (USA)	3	C	USA	Dirt	I
70	118	Russian Camelot (IRE)	4	C	AUS	Turf	M
70	118	Sanrei Pocket (JPN)	6	H	JPN	Turf	I, L
70	118	Sir Dragonet (IRE)	5	H	AUS	Turf	L
70	118	Sir Ron Priestley (GB)	5	H	GB	Turf	L
70	118	Southern Legend (AUS)	9	G	HK	Turf	M
70	118	Space Blues (IRE)	5	H	GB	Turf	M
70	118	Stradivarius (IRE)	7	H	GB	Turf	E
70	118	The Revenant (GB)	6	G	FR	Turf	M
70	118	Think It Over (AUS)	6	G	AUS	Turf	I
70	118	Titleholder (JPN)	3	C	JPN	Turf	E
70	118	Unicorn Lion (IRE)	5	H	JPN	Turf	L
70	118	Waikuku (IRE)	6	G	HK	Turf	M

== Guide ==
A complete guide to the main table above.

Rank
A horse's position in the list, with the most highly rated at number 1. Each horse is ranked once according to its highest rating. Any lesser ratings for the same horse are not ranked.

Rating
A rating represents a weight value in pounds, with higher values given to horses which showed greater ability. It is judged that these weights would equalise the abilities of the horses if carried in a theoretical handicap race. The minimum rating required for inclusion is 115.

Horse
Each horse's name is followed by a suffix (from the IFHA's International Code of Suffixes) which indicates the country foaled.

Age
The age of the horse at the time it achieved its rating. The racing ages of all horses foaled in a particular part of the world increase simultaneously, regardless of the actual date of foaling.
Dates of age increase by location foaled
Northern Hemisphere	1 January
South America	1 July
Australia, New Zealand and South Africa	1 August

Sex
C	Colt	Ungelded male horse up to four-years-old
F	Filly	Female horse up to four-years-old
H	Horse	Ungelded male horse over four-years-old
M	Mare	Female horse over four-years-old
G	Gelding	Gelded male horse of any age

Trained
The country where the horse was trained at the time of the rating, abbreviated using the International Code of Suffixes.

Position
The horse's finishing position in the race shown. The actual finishing order can sometimes be amended following an inquiry or a disqualification.
=	Dead-heat
↑	Promoted from original finishing position
↓	Relegated from original finishing position

Race
The race (or one of the races) for which the horse achieved its rating. A defeated horse can be rated above its higher-placed opponents if it carried more weight.

Surface
The surface of the track on which the race was run, eg. turf or dirt. Synthetic surfaces are described as "artificial".

Distance
The distance of the race in metres. In some countries (eg. Canada, Great Britain, Ireland and the United States), the length of a race is usually expressed in miles and furlongs. These units have been converted to metres to allow for universal comparison.
Common conversions
5 furlongs	= 1,006 m	1 mile and 1½ furlongs	= 1,911 m
6 furlongs	= 1,207 m	1 mile and 2 furlongs	= 2,012 m
6½ furlongs	= 1,308 m	1 mile and 2½ furlongs	= 2,112 m
7 furlongs	= 1,408 m	1 mile and 3 furlongs	= 2,213 m
7½ furlongs	= 1,509 m	1 mile and 4 furlongs	= 2,414 m
1 mile	= 1,609 m	1 mile and 6 furlongs	= 2,816 m
1 mile and ½ furlong	= 1,710 m	2 miles	= 3,219 m
1 mile and 1 furlong	= 1,811 m	2 miles and 4 furlongs	= 4,023 m

Category
		Metres	Furlongs
S	Sprint	1,000–1,300; 1,000–1,599 (CAN / USA)	5–6.5; 5–7.99 (CAN / USA)
M	Mile	1,301–1,899; 1,600–1,899 (CAN / USA)	6.51–9.49; 8–9.49 (CAN / USA)
I	Intermediate	1,900–2,100	9.5–10.5
L	Long	2,101–2,700	10.51–13.5
E	Extended	2,701+	13.51+

International Code of Suffixes
The following countries have been represented in the WTR as foaling or training locations since the first edition in 2004.
ARG	Argentina	ITY	Italy
AUS	Australia	JPN	Japan
BRZ	Brazil	KSA	Saudi Arabia
CAN	Canada	NZ	New Zealand
CHI	Chile	SAF	South Africa
CZE	Czech Republic	SIN	Singapore
FR	France	SPA	Spain
GB	Great Britain	TUR	Turkey
GER	Germany	UAE	United Arab Emirates
HK	Hong Kong	USA	United States
HUN	Hungary	VEN	Venezuela
IRE	Ireland	ZIM	Zimbabwe

Shading
The shaded areas represent lesser ratings recorded by horses which were more highly rated in a different category. The IFHA publishes this information when the lower rating is the overall top performance in a particular category.
