= 2021 Breeders' Cup Challenge series =

Series of horse races

The 2021 Breeders' Cup Challenge series consisted of 84 horse races that provided the respective winners with an automatic "Win and You're In" Berth in the 2021 Breeders' Cup, held on November 5 and 6. Races were chosen by the Breeders' Cup organization and include key races in the various Breeders' Cup divisions from around the world. The Breeders' Cup organization pays the Breeders' Cup entry fee for the challenge race winners, provided they had been nominated as foals. They also provide travel allowances for out of state competitors

== Summary ==
The 2021 Breeders' Cup Challenge series consisted of 84 races from across the United States and 9 other countries. The 2021 series marked a return to a more normal racing schedule after the 2020 racing calendar was disrupted by the COVID-19 pandemic, and more closely resembles the 2019 series. Two new races were added to the series: the Suburban Stakes, a qualifier for the Classic, and the Calumet Turf Cup, a qualifier for the Turf. In recognition of the Horseracing Integrity and Safety Act passed in December 2020, the challenge series races did not permit raceday medication.

On October 27, a total of 196 horses were pre-entered in the Breeders' Cup, of which 46 were automatic qualifiers through the challenge races.

== Challenge Series races ==
The following table shows the Breeders' Cup Challenge races for 2021 and respective winners. The status column shows whether the horse was pre-entered.

Month	Race	Track	Location	Division	Winner	Status
December	Gran Premio Internacional Carlos Pellegrini	San Isidro	Argentina	Breeders' Cup Turf	Cool Day (ARG)	bypass
January	Paddock Stakes	Kenilworth	South Africa	Breeders' Cup Filly & Mare Turf	Queen Supreme (IRE)	pre-entered
January	Queen's Plate	Kenilworth	South Africa	Breeders' Cup Mile	Jet Dark (SAF)	bypass
February	February Stakes	Tokyo	Japan	Breeders' Cup Classic	Cafe Pharaoh	bypass
May	Gran Premio Criadores	Palermo	Argentina	Breeders' Cup Distaff	Blue Stripe (ARG)	pre-entered
May	Gran Premio Club Hipico Falabella	Santiago	Chile	Breeders' Cup Mile	Succeso (CHI)	bypass
May	Victoria Mile	Tokyo	Japan	Breeders' Cup Filly & Mare Turf	Gran Alegria (JPN)	bypass
May	Shoemaker Mile	Santa Anita	California	Breeders' Cup Mile	Smooth Like Straight	pre-entered
June	Jaipur Stakes	Belmont Park	New York	Breeders' Cup Turf Sprint	Casa Creed	pre-entered
June	Ogden Phipps Stakes	Belmont Park	New York	Breeders' Cup Distaff	Letruska	pre-entered
June	Metropolitan Handicap	Belmont Park	New York	Breeders' Cup Dirt Mile	Silver State	pre-entered
June	Yasuda Kinen	Tokyo	Japan	Breeders' Cup Mile	Danon Kingly (JPN)	bypass
June	Queen Anne Stakes	Royal Ascot	England	Breeders' Cup Mile	Palace Pier (GB)	retired
June	Prince of Wales's Stakes	Royal Ascot	England	Breeders' Cup Turf	Love IRE	pre-entered
June	Norfolk Stakes	Royal Ascot	England	Breeders' Cup Juvenile Turf Sprint	Perfect Power (IRE)	bypass
June	Diamond Jubilee Stakes	Royal Ascot	England	Breeders' Cup Turf Sprint	Dream of Dreams (IRE)	bypass
June	Fleur de Lis Handicap	Churchill Downs	Kentucky	Breeders' Cup Distaff	Letruska	pre-entered
June	Stephen Foster Handicap	Churchill Downs	Kentucky	Breeders' Cup Classic	Maxfield	bypass
June	Gran Premio Pamplona	Monterrico	Peru	Breeders' Cup Filly & Mare Turf	Reina de Mollendo	pre-entered
June	Takarazuka Kinen	Hanshin	Japan	Breeders' Cup Turf	Chrono Genesis (JPN)	bypass
July	Princess Rooney Handicap	Gulfstream Park	Florida	Breeders' Cup Filly & Mare Sprint	Ce Ce	pre-entered
July	Suburban Stakes	Belmont Park	New York	Breeders' Cup Classic	Max Player	pre-entered
July	John A. Nerud	Belmont Park	New York	Breeders' Cup Sprint	Mind Control	bypass
July	Haskell Invitational	Monmouth	New Jersey	Breeders' Cup Classic	Mandaloun	injured
July	King George VI and Queen Elizabeth Stakes	Ascot	England	Breeders' Cup Turf	Adayar (IRE)	bypass
July	Sussex Stakes	Goodwood	England	Breeders' Cup Mile	Alcohol Free (IRE)	bypass
July	Bing Crosby Handicap	Del Mar	California	Breeders' Cup Sprint	Dr. Schivel	pre-entered
August	Clement L. Hirsch Stakes	Del Mar	California	Breeders' Cup Distaff	Shedaresthedevil	pre-entered
August	Whitney Handicap	Saratoga	New York	Breeders' Cup Classic	Knicks Go	pre-entered
August	Fourstardave Handicap	Saratoga	New York	Breeders' Cup Mile	Got Stormy	pre-entered
August	Prix Jacques Le Marois	Deauville	France	Breeders' Cup Mile	Palace Pier (GB)	retired
August	Juddmonte International	York	England	Breeders' Cup Classic	Mishriff (IRE)	bypass
August	Yorkshire Oaks	York	England	Breeders' Cup Filly & Mare Turf	Snowfall	bypass
August	Nunthorpe Stakes	York	England	Breeders' Cup Turf Sprint	Winter Power (IRE)	bypass
August	Pacific Classic	Del Mar	California	Breeders' Cup Classic	Tripoli	pre-entered
August	Del Mar Handicap	Del Mar	California	Breeders' Cup Turf	Astronaut	pre-entered
August	Prix Morny	Deauville	France	Breeders' Cup Juvenile Turf Sprint	Perfect Power (IRE)	bypass
August	Personal Ensign Stakes	Saratoga	New York	Breeders' Cup Distaff	Letruska	pre-entered
August	Ballerina Stakes	Saratoga	New York	Breeders' Cup Filly & Mare Sprint	Gamine	pre-entered
August	Sword Dancer	Saratoga	New York	Breeders' Cup Turf	Gufo	pre-entered
August	Pat O'Brien Handicap	Del Mar	California	Breeders' Cup Dirt Mile	Ginobili	pre-entered
September	Jockey Club Gold Cup	Saratoga	New York	Breeders' Cup Classic	Max Player	pre-entered
September	Flower Bowl	Saratoga	New York	Breeders' Cup Filly & Mare Turf	War Like Goddess	pre-entered
September	Calumet Turf Cup	Kentucky Downs	Kentucky	Breeders' Cup Turf	Imperador (ARG)	withdrawn
September	Irish Champion Stakes	Leopardstown	Ireland	Breeders' Cup Turf	St Mark's Basilica (FR)	retired
September	Kentucky Downs Turf Sprint	Kentucky Downs	Kentucky	Breeders' Cup Turf Sprint	Gear Jockey	pre-entered
September	Juvenile Stakes	Leopardstown	Ireland	Breeders' Cup Juvenile Turf	Atomic Jones (FR)	bypass
September	Matron Stakes	Leopardstown	Ireland	Breeders' Cup Filly & Mare Turf	No Speak Alexander (IRE)	bypass
September	Moyglare Stud Stakes	Curragh	Ireland	Breeders' Cup Juvenile Fillies Turf	Discoveries (IRE)	bypass
September	Flying Five Stakes	Curragh	Ireland	Breeders' Cup Turf Sprint	Romantic Proposal (IRE)	bypass
September	Iroquois Stakes	Churchill Downs	Kentucky	Breeders' Cup Juvenile	Major General	bypass
September	Pocahontas Stakes	Churchill Downs	Kentucky	Breeders' Cup Juvenile Fillies	Hidden Connection	pre-entered
September	Jockey Club Derby	Belmont	New York	Breeders' Cup Turf	Yibir (GB)	pre-entered
September	Woodbine Mile	Woodbine	Canada	Breeders' Cup Mile	Town Cruise	bypass
September	Natalma Stakes	Woodbine	Canada	Breeders' Cup Juvenile Fillies Turf	Wild Beauty (GB)	bypass
September	Summer Stakes	Woodbine	Canada	Breeders' Cup Juvenile Turf	Albahr (GB)	pre-entered
September	Rockfel Stakes	Newmarket	England	Breeders' Cup Juvenile Fillies Turf	Hello You (IRE)	pre-entered
September	Royal Lodge Stakes	Newmarket	England	Breeders' Cup Juvenile Turf	Royal Patronage (FR)	bypass
October	American Pharoah Stakes	Santa Anita	California	Breeders' Cup Juvenile	Corniche	pre-entered
October	Chandelier Stakes	Santa Anita	California	Breeders' Cup Juvenile Fillies	Ain't Easy	pre-entered
October	Speakeasy Stakes	Santa Anita	California	Breeders' Cup Juvenile Turf Sprint	One Timer	pre-entered
October	Champagne Stakes	Belmont Park	New York	Breeders' Cup Juvenile	Jack Christopher	pre-entered
September	Rodeo Drive Stakes	Santa Anita	California	Breeders' Cup Filly & Mare Turf	Going to Vegas	pre-entered
October	Awesome Again Stakes	Santa Anita	California	Breeders' Cup Classic	Medina Spirit	pre-entered
October	Santa Anita Sprint Championship	Santa Anita	California	Breeders' Cup Sprint	Dr. Schivel	pre-entered
October	Frizette Stakes	Belmont Park	New York	Breeders' Cup Juvenile Fillies	Echo Zulu	pre-entered
October	Zenyatta Stakes	Santa Anita	California	Breeders' Cup Distaff	Private Mission	pre-entered
October	Prix de l'Abbaye de Longchamp	Longchamp	France	Breeders' Cup Turf Sprint	A Case of You (IRE)	pre-entered
October	Prix de l'Opéra	Longchamp	France	Breeders' Cup Filly & Mare Turf	Rougir (FR)	pre-entered
October	Prix Jean-Luc Lagardère	Longchamp	France	Breeders' Cup Juvenile Turf	Angel Bleu (FR)	bypass
October	Prix Marcel Boussac	Longchamp	France	Breeders' Cup Juvenile Fillies Turf	Zellie (FR)	bypass
October	Prix de l'Arc de Triomphe	Longchamp	France	Breeders' Cup Turf	Torquator Tasso (GER)	bypass
October	Phoenix Stakes	Keeneland	Kentucky	Breeders' Cup Sprint	Special Reserve	pre-entered
October	Alcibiades Stakes	Keeneland	Kentucky	Breeders' Cup Juvenile Fillies	Juju's Map	pre-entered
October	Breeders' Futurity Stakes	Keeneland	Kentucky	Breeders' Cup Juvenile	Rattle N Roll	pre-entered
October	First Lady Stakes	Keeneland	Kentucky	Breeders' Cup Filly & Mare Turf	Blowout (GB)	bypass
October	Thoroughbred Club of America Stakes	Keeneland	Kentucky	Breeders' Cup Filly & Mare Sprint	Bell's the One	bypass
September	Vosburgh Stakes	Belmont Park	New York	Breeders' Cup Sprint	Following Sea	pre-entered
October	Shadwell Turf Mile Stakes	Keeneland	Kentucky	Breeders' Cup Mile	In Love (BRZ)	pre-entered
October	Indian Summer Stakes	Keeneland	Kentucky	Breeders' Cup Juvenile Turf Sprint	Averly Jane	pre-entered
October	Bourbon Stakes	Keeneland	Kentucky	Breeders' Cup Juvenile Turf	Tiz the Bomb	pre-entered
October	Spinster Stakes	Keeneland	Kentucky	Breeders' Cup Distaff	Letruska	pre-entered
October	Belmont Futurity	Belmont Park	New York	Breeders' Cup Juvenile Turf Sprint	Slipstream	pre-entered
October	Jessamine Stakes	Keeneland	Kentucky	Breeders' Cup Juvenile Fillies Turf	California Angel	pre-entered
October	Champion Stakes	Ascot	England	Breeders' Cup Turf	Sealiway (FR)	bypass
October	Queen Elizabeth II Stakes	Ascot	England	Breeders' Cup Mile	Baaeed (GB)	bypass

== See also ==
- 2021 British Champions Series
