= Sir Henry Cecil Stakes =

Flat horse race in Britain

- Class: Listed
- Location: July Course; Newmarket, England
- Race type: Flat / Thoroughbred
- Sponsor: Bahrain International
- Website: Newmarket

Race information
- Distance: 1 mile (1,609 metres)
- Surface: Turf
- Track: Straight
- Qualification: Three-year-olds excluding Group 1 or Group 2 winners since two-year-old
- Weight: 9 st 3 lb Allowances; 5 lb for fillies Penalties; 3 lb for Listed winners 5 lb for G3 winners *after 2018
- Purse: £25,500 (2020); 1st: £14,461

Sir Henry Cecil Stakes
2026
Shayem	Colori Forever	Conclave

Previous years
2025
Opera Ballo	Seagulls Eleven	King Of Cities
2024
Al Musmak	Kitty Rose	Lead Artist
2023
Nostrum	Embesto	New Endeavour
2022
Mighty Ulysses	Alflaila	Berkshire Shadow
2021
Baaeed	Maximal	One Ruler

2020-2011
2020
Al Suhail	Mystery Power	Ropey Guest
2019
Duke Of Hazzard	Momkin	Urban Icon
2018
Naval Intelligence	Gabr	Masaarr
2016
Lumiere	Cymric	Manaboo
2015
Tupi	Bartel	Bossy Guest
2014
Table Rock	Pretzel	Parbold
2013
Montiridge	Ashdan	Alhebayeb
2012
Sovereign Debt	Mukhadram	Saigon
2011
Bridgefield	Casual Glimpse	Cai Shen

2010-2007
2010
Critical Moment	Fair Trade	Invincible Soul
2009
Spring Of Fame	Cloudy Start	Loch Linnhe
2008
Generous Thought	Alfathaa	Choose Your Moment
2007
Traffic Guard	Drumfire	Mesbaah

The Sir Henry Cecil Stakes is a Listed flat horse race in Great Britain open to three-year-old horses. It is run on the July Course at Newmarket over a distance of 1 mile (1,609 metres), and it is scheduled to take place each year in July.

== History ==
The race was first run in 2007 as the Xplor Conditions Stakes. It was renamed the Stubbs Stakes and upgraded to Listed status in 2013. In 2014 it was renamed in memory of Sir Henry Cecil, who died in 2013 and was British flat racing Champion Trainer 10 times. Amongst the prizes for the first running under the new name was a rose from Cecil's garden at his Warren Place stables. It is held on the opening day of Newmarket's three-day July Festival meeting.

== Winners ==
Year	Winner	Jockey	Trainer	Time
2007	Traffic Guard	John Egan	Stan Moore	1:38.47
2008	Generous Thought	Robert Winston	Paul Howling	1:39.44
2009	Spring Of Fame	Frankie Dettori	Saeed bin Suroor	1:38.52
2010	Critical Moment	Michael Hills	Barry Hills	1:38.16
2011	Bridgefield	Mickael Barzalona	Mahmood Al Zarooni	1:44.54
2012	Sovereign Debt	Jamie Spencer	Michael Bell	1:41.60
2013	Montiridge	Richard Hughes	Richard Hannon Sr.	1:37.42
2014	Table Rock	Ryan Moore	Aidan O'Brien	1:38.79
2015	Tupi	Richard Hughes	Richard Hannon Jr.	1:37.80
2016	Lumiere	Joe Fanning	Mark Johnston	1:35.74
2017	Beat The Bank	Jim Crowley	Andrew Balding	1:37.86
2018	Naval Intelligence	John Egan	Jane Chapple-Hyam	1:38.64
2019	Duke Of Hazzard	P. J. McDonald	Paul Cole	1:36.98
2020	Al Suhail	William Buick	Charlie Appleby	1:38.12
2021	Baaeed	Jim Crowley	William Haggas	1:36.95
2022	Mighty Ulysses	Frankie Dettori	John & Thady Gosden	1:37.46
2023	Nostrum	Ryan Moore	Sir Michael Stoute	1:36.61
2024	Al Musmak	Silvestre De Sousa	Roger Varian	1:38.55
2025	Opera Ballo	William Buick	Charlie Appleby	1:36.43
2026	Shayem	Clifford Lee	Karl Burke	1:39.70

== See also ==
- Horse racing in Great Britain
- List of British flat horse races
