= Baaeed =

British-bred Thoroughbred racehorse

- Racing silks of Shadwell Estate
- Sire: Sea the Stars
- Grandsire: Cape Cross
- Dam: Aghareed
- Damsire: Kingmambo
- Sex: Colt
- Foaled: 8 April 2018 (age 7)
- Country: United Kingdom
- Color: Bay
- Breeder: Shadwell Estate
- Owner: Shadwell Estate
- Trainer: William Haggas
- Record: 11: 10-0-0
- Earnings: £2,622,282

Major wins
- Sir Henry Cecil Stakes (2021); Thoroughbred Stakes (2021); Prix du Moulin (2021); Queen Elizabeth II Stakes (2021); Lockinge Stakes (2022); Queen Anne Stakes (2022); Sussex Stakes (2022); International Stakes (2022); Timeform rating: 137
- Last updated on 11 October 2025

Baaeed (foaled 8 April 2018) is a British-bred retired Thoroughbred racehorse. He began his racing career as a three-year-old in 2021 and was undefeated in six races that year, including the Prix du Moulin and Queen Elizabeth II Stakes. In the following year he took his unbeaten run to ten with victories in the Lockinge Stakes, Queen Anne Stakes, Sussex Stakes and International Stakes, before losing his final race in the Champion Stakes.

== Background ==
Baaeed is a bay horse with no white markings bred in England by Hamdan bin Rashid Al Maktoum's Shadwell Estate. The colt was sent into training with William Haggas at Somerville Lodge in Newmarket, Suffolk.

He was from the eighth crop of foals sired by Sea the Stars who won the 2000 Guineas, Epsom Derby and Prix de l'Arc de Triomphe in 2009. His other major winners have included Harzand, Taghrooda, Stradivarius, Sea of Class and Sea The Moon. Baaeed's dam Aghareed showed good racing ability, winning two of her five starts including the Listed Prix de Liancourt before becoming a successful broodmare whose previous foals included Hukum. She was a daughter of the Breeders' Cup Filly & Mare Turf winner Lahudood and a female-line descendant of the outstanding racehorse and broodmare Height of Fashion.

== Racing career ==
=== 2021: three-year-old season ===
Before the start of Baaeed's racing career his owner Hamdan Al Maktoum died and the colt raced in the ownership of Shadwell Estate. The colt was ridden in his first two races by Dane O'Neill. Having been unraced as a juvenile he made his track debut on 7 June 2021 in a maiden race over one mile on good to firm ground at Leicester Racecourse and started at odds of 6/1 in a fourteen-runner field. He produced a strong late run to gain the advantage in the final strides and won "cosily" by a length and a quarter from Tamaamm. Twelve days after his win at Leicester the colt started 4/6 favourite for a novice race (for horses with no more than two previous wins) over the same distance at Newmarket Racecourse and recorded his second success in "impressive" style, coming home seven and a half lengths clear of Komachi.

Baaeed was then stepped up to Listed class for the Sir Henry Cecil Stakes over the same course and distance on 8 July. He was ridden for the first time by Jim Crowley, who became his regular jockey, and went off the 10/11 favourite in a five-runner field. Baaeed won easily by four lengths from Maximal. After the race William Haggas said

He's looking talented. He's got speed and his brother is a mile-and-a-halfer, so he's an exciting horse. His pedigree says he could step up to a mile and a quarter, but his style of racing doesn’t really say that. We'll see, [but] I don't think there’s any hurry to step him up in trip. I thought it was a really good Listed contest today, so to do that – come from the back and show a nice turn of foot – is a good sign.

On 30 July on good to soft ground at Goodwood Racecourse, Baaeed started the 2/5 favourite for the Group 3 Thoroughbred Stakes, with the best fancied of his six opponents being the Dee Stakes winner El Drama and Tactical (July Stakes). In a repeat of his performance in the Sir Henry Cecil Stakes, he drew away to win by six and a half lengths from El Drama. Haggas commented:

It was very impressive, I was thrilled because I wasn't sure about the ground, but every time he runs he just keeps doing that, it's fantastic ... Jim was very happy, we're all soaking it up and enjoying it ... I can't see any point in going up in trip from here at the moment. We'll keep him at a mile, I don't know where we'll go.

Despite never being raced above Group 3 class, Baaeed was rated the 17th best racehorse in the world in the interim edition of the World's Best Racehorse Rankings published on 8 August. For his first run at Group 1 level, Baaeed was sent to France and started 1/2 favourite for the Prix du Moulin over 1600 metres at Longchamp Racecourse on 5 September. His five opponents were Snow Lantern, Order of Australia, Victor Ludorum, Lope Y Fernandez (runner-up in the Queen Anne Stakes) and Novemba (German 1000 Guineas). Baaeed went to the front 200 metres from the finish and kept on well to win by one and a quarter lengths from Order of Australia with Victor Ludorum a short neck away in third place. Haggas said

He's still got those old ears stuck forward so I don't think he was flat out. When the German horse came past him it lit him up a bit and because of where he was drawn he didn't have any proper cover. He was just a bit fresh and enthusiastic, but he won nicely. He's got in a bit of a fight today which he hasn't had to before. It's all part of the learning process.

Baaeed ended his campaign in the Group 1 Queen Elizabeth II Stakes over one mile on good to soft ground at Ascot Racecourse on 16 October. He started the 2/1 second favourite behind the four-year-old Palace Pier in a ten-runner field which also included The Revenant, Alcohol Free, Benbatl, Mother Earth, Lady Bowthorpe and Lord Glitters. Baaeed held off a sustained challenge from Palace Pier in the closing stages to win by a neck. Jim Crowley commented "I think Baaeed could be a world champion. He's just a beast, he keeps getting better. It was magical. I think people forget he's come such a long way in a short space of time". Shadwell's racing manager Angus Gold said "I thought how much Sheikh Hamdan would have loved this. It's a huge day for the team, for his family and for his legacy in the year he died ... He hasn't had a hard life so far and he has done what has been asked of him the whole way through and I can't see why he wouldn't go on next year."

In the 2021 World's Best Racehorse Rankings Baaeed was rated on 125, making him the joint sixth-best racehorse in the world, four pounds the top-rated Knicks Go.

=== 2022: four-year-old season ===
Baaeed began his second campaign in the Group 1 Lockinge Stakes over the straight mile course at Newbury Racecourse on 14 May. He started the 4/9 favourite in a nine-runner field, which included Real World (Prix Daniel Wildenstein, Zabeel Mile) Mother Earth, Alcohol Free, Sir Busker (Royal Hunt Cup) and Chindit (Champagne Stakes. Crowley sent the favourite into the lead a furlong out and the horse accelerated away from his opponents to win "easily" by three and a quarter lengths from Real World. After the race Crowley said

He is an absolute pleasure to ride and very straightforward. He is the most beautifully bred horse. He is everything you want in a racehorse. Nothing seems to faze him. He doesn't appear to have any weaknesses. I can't think of one. He is really bright, has gears, relaxes and stays the mile extremely well and has got a turn of foot ... This horse looks like he could be the best [I have ridden]. It was very straightforward. Everything went smoothly – it was like clockwork.

In the Queen Anne Stakes on 14 June at Royal Ascot, Baaeed went off the 1/6 favourite against six opponents, namely Accidental Agent, Real World, Order of Australia, Chindit, Lights On (Pipalong Stakes) and Sir Busker. Baaeed went to the front inside the last quarter mile and won "comfortably" by one and three quarter lengths from Real World, with a gap of four lengths back to Order of Australia in third place. Crowley commented

"It doesn't get any easier than that. The only way to explain it is like when you go to the funfair and you're waiting in a queue for a fast ride, that's the feeling you get before. It's just a buzz. Once you're on him and you're away it's great – I love it" while Haggas said "He's obviously a good miler and he's bred to get further. I think we'd like to try it and it would be remiss of us not to. The easy option is to stay at a mile but I think we'll give it a go."

Baaeed continued his impressive 4 year old campaign with a comfortable win in the Sussex Stakes over a mile at Goodwood, at the end of the July. Stretched for the first time over 10 furlongs in the International Stakes at York in August, he dominated the field, drawing comparisons to Frankel. For what was intended as his last race, his connection selected the Champion Stakes at Ascot over 10 furlongs instead of the Arc de Triomphe over a mile and a half. Racing as the heavy favourite, Baaeed didn't show his famous foot turn on the stretch and finished just fourth, behind the surprising winner, Bay Bridge, Adayar and My Prospero. After the race, his jockey cited the soft ground as the main reason for the subpar performance of his star horse. His owner confirmed that the Champion Stakes had been his last race and announced his retirement.

== Race record ==
| Date | Race name | D(f) | Course | Class | Prize (£K) | Odds | Runners | Place | Margin | Runner-up | Time | Jockey | Trainer |
|---|---|---|---|---|---|---|---|---|---|---|---|---|---|
| 7 June 2021 | British Stallion Studs EBF Maiden Stakes | 8 | Leicester | 4 | 5 | 6/1 | 14 | 1 | 1.25 | Tamaamm | 1:43.69 | Dane O'Neill | William Haggas |
| 19 June 2021 | MansionBet EBF Novice Stakes | 8 | Newmarket | 2 | 5 | 4/6F | 10 | 1 | 7.5 | Komachi | 1:38.72 | Dane O'Neill | William Haggas |
| 8 July 2021 | Sir Henry Cecil Stakes | 8 | Newmarket | 1 (Listed) | 29 | 10/11F | 5 | 1 | 4 | Maximal | 1:36.95 | Jim Crowley | William Haggas |
| 30 July 2021 | Thoroughbred Stakes | 7 | Goodwood | 1 (G3) | 56 | 2/5F | 7 | 1 | 6.50 | El Drama | 1:41.20 | Jim Crowley | William Haggas |
| 5 September 2021 | Prix du Moulin | 8 | Longchamp | 1 (G1) | 229 | 1/2F | 6 | 1 | 1.25 | Order of Australia | 1:39.13 | Jim Crowley | William Haggas |
| 16 October 2021 | Queen Elizabeth II Stakes | 8 | Ascot | 1 (G1) | 623 | 2/1 | 10 | 1 | nk | Palace Pier | 1:42.57 | Jim Crowley | William Haggas |
| 14 May 2022 | Lockinge Stakes | 8 | Newbury | 1 (G1) | 198 | 4/9F | 9 | 1 | 3.25 | Real World | 1:35.71 | Jim Crowley | William Haggas |
| 14 June 2022 | Queen Anne Stakes | 8 | Ascot | 1 (G1) | 340 | 1/6F | 7 | 1 | 1.75 | Real World | 1:37.76 | Jim Crowley | William Haggas |
| 27 July 2022 | Sussex Stakes | 8 | Goodwood | 1 (G1) | 567 | 1/6F | 7 | 1 | 1.75 | Modern Games | 1:37.56 | Jim Crowley | William Haggas |
| 17 August 2022 | International Stakes | 10.5 | York | 1 (G1) | 567 | 1/2F | 6 | 1 | 6.5 | Mishriff | 2:09.30 | Jim Crowley | William Haggas |
| 15 October 2022 | Champion Stakes | 10 | Ascot | 1 (G1) | 737 | 1/4F | 9 | 4 | -- | -- | 2:09:46 | Jim Crowley | William Haggas |

== Pedigree ==
Pedigree of Baaeed (GB), bay colt, 2018
| Sire Sea the Stars (IRE) 2006 | Cape Cross (IRE); 1994 | Green Desert | Danzig |
| Sire Sea the Stars (IRE) 2006 | Cape Cross (IRE); 1994 | Green Desert | Foreign Courier |
| Sire Sea the Stars (IRE) 2006 | Cape Cross (IRE); 1994 | Park Appeal | Ahonoora |
| Sire Sea the Stars (IRE) 2006 | Cape Cross (IRE); 1994 | Park Appeal | Balidaress |
| Sire Sea the Stars (IRE) 2006 | Urban Sea (USA); 1989 | Miswaki | Mr. Prospector |
| Sire Sea the Stars (IRE) 2006 | Urban Sea (USA); 1989 | Miswaki | Hopespringseternal |
| Sire Sea the Stars (IRE) 2006 | Urban Sea (USA); 1989 | Allegretta | Lombard |
| Sire Sea the Stars (IRE) 2006 | Urban Sea (USA); 1989 | Allegretta | Anatevka |
| Dam Aghareed (USA) 2009 | Kingmambo (USA); 1990 | Mr. Prospector | Raise a Native |
| Dam Aghareed (USA) 2009 | Kingmambo (USA); 1990 | Mr. Prospector | Gold Digger |
| Dam Aghareed (USA) 2009 | Kingmambo (USA); 1990 | Miesque | Nureyev |
| Dam Aghareed (USA) 2009 | Kingmambo (USA); 1990 | Miesque | Pasadoble |
| Dam Aghareed (USA) 2009 | Lahudood (GB); 2003 | Singspiel (IRE) | In The Wings (GB) |
| Dam Aghareed (USA) 2009 | Lahudood (GB); 2003 | Singspiel (IRE) | Glorious Song (CAN) |
| Dam Aghareed (USA) 2009 | Lahudood (GB); 2003 | Rahayeb | Arazi (USA) |
| Dam Aghareed (USA) 2009 | Lahudood (GB); 2003 | Rahayeb | Bashayer (USA) (Family: 2-f) |

- Baaeed is inbred 3 × 4 to Mr Prospector, meaning that this stallion appears in both the third and fourth generations of his pedigree.

== Stud career ==
Baaeed stands at stud at Shadwell Stud in Beech House Stud, UK. His 2024 stud fee was £80,000, Oct 1st SLF. His first foal was a bay filly born at Haras de la Perelle in Normandy, from her dam, Mejthaam, the daughter of Exceed And Excel. Mejthaam was sold, carrying the filly, for 260,000gns (US$344,868) to Chantilly Bloodstock Agency.
