= Snow Lantern =

British-bred Thoroughbred racehorse

- Racing colours of Rockcliffe Stud
- Sire: Frankel
- Grandsire: Galileo
- Dam: Sky Lantern
- Damsire: Red Clubs
- Sex: Filly
- Foaled: 1 March 2018
- Country: United Kingdom
- Colour: Grey
- Breeder: Rockcliffe Stud
- Owner: Rockcliffe Stud
- Trainer: Richard Hannon Jr.
- Record: 5: 2-2-1
- Earnings: £225,694

Major wins
- Falmouth Stakes (2021)

Snow Lantern (foaled 1 March 2018) is a British Thoroughbred racehorse. After finishing second in her only race as a two-year-old in 2020 she developed into a top class performer in the following year. She won a minor event on her three-year-old debut and went on to finish second in the Coronation Stakes and then won the Group 1 Falmouth Stakes.

== Background ==
Snow Lantern is a grey filly bred in England by the Rockcliffe Stud, a Gloucestershire-based breeding establishment owned by the Keswick family. The filly was sent into training with Richard Hannon Jr. at East Everleigh in Wiltshire.

She was from the fifth crop of foals sired by Frankel, an undefeated racehorse whose other progeny have included Cracksman, Adayar, Soul Stirring and Hurricane Lane. Snow Lantern's dam Sky Lantern, from whom she inherited her grey coat, was an outstanding racemare who won four Group 1 races for the Keswick family, including the 2013 1000 Guineas. She was a female-line descendant of the British broodmare Miss Justice (foaled 1961), making her a distant relative of Thatching and Lorenzaccio.

== Racing career ==
=== 2020: two-year-old season ===
On her racecourse debut Snow Lantern started at odds of 6/1 for a novice race (for horses with no more than two previous wins) over seven furlongs on good to firm ground at Ascot Racecourse on 25 July. Ridden by Pat Dobbs she started slowly but stayed on well in the closing stages to take second place, one and a quarter lengths behind the winner Zabeel Queen.

=== 2021: three-year-old season ===
In 2021 Sean Levey became Snow Lantern's regular jockey. She began her campaign in a maiden race over one mile at Newbury Racecourse on 18 April and recorded her first success as she won "comfortably" by one and three quarter lengths from the favourite Derab after taking the lead two furlongs from the finish. The filly was then stepped up in class and started favourite for the Listed Michael Seely Memorial Stakes at York Racecourse on 14 May. After fighting against Levey's attempts to restrain her she made no progress in the closing stages and came home third behind Premio Bacio and Creative Flair, beaten five lengths by the winner. Despite her defeat Snow Lantern was moved up to the highest level to contest the Group 1 Coronation Stakes on heavy ground at Royal Ascot and started a 14/1 outsider in an eleven-runner field. After racing in mid-division she finished strongly and overcame the lack of a clear run in the straight to take second place behind Alcohol Free. Mother Earth finished third while the other beaten horses included Pretty Gorgeous, Empress Josephine and Shale.

On 9 July Snow Lantern faced older fillies and mares in the Group 1 Falmouth Stakes over one mile on good to firm ground at Newmarket Racecourse and started the 6/1 third favourite behind Alcohol Free and Mother Earth. The other contenders included Pretty Gorgeous and Premio Bacio as well as the four-year-old Champers Elysees and the five-year-olds Lady Bowthorpe (Dahlia Stakes) and Queen Power (Middleton Stakes). Richard Hannon was particularly keen that the filly should run well as her mother, Sky Lantern, had been controversially beaten in the race in 2003. Snow Lantern settled behind the leaders along the far-side rail as Alcohol Free set the pace, but was switched right to deliver her challenge in the final furlong. In a closely contested finish she gained the advantage in the final strides and won by half a length and a neck from Mother Earth and Alcohol Free with Lady Bowthorpe, Primo Bacio, Just Beautiful and Pretty Gorgeous finishing close behind. After the race Hannon said "I've always thought she was extremely good... She looked like she was going to struggle for room but Sean had the horse under him and she was brilliant... She was a little bit unlucky in the Coronation Stakes but was really exceptional there... She's got a big following and she's shown how good she is."

== Pedigree ==
Pedigree of Snow Lantern (GB), grey filly, 2018
Sire Frankel (GB) 2008	Galileo (IRE); 1998	Sadler's Wells (USA)	Northern Dancer (CAN)
Sire Frankel (GB) 2008	Galileo (IRE); 1998	Sadler's Wells (USA)	Fairy Bridge
Sire Frankel (GB) 2008	Galileo (IRE); 1998	Urban Sea (USA)	Miswaki
Sire Frankel (GB) 2008	Galileo (IRE); 1998	Urban Sea (USA)	Allegretta (GB)
Sire Frankel (GB) 2008	Kind (IRE); 2001	Danehill (USA)	Danzig
Sire Frankel (GB) 2008	Kind (IRE); 2001	Danehill (USA)	Razyana
Sire Frankel (GB) 2008	Kind (IRE); 2001	Rainbow Lake (GB)	Rainbow Quest (USA)
Sire Frankel (GB) 2008	Kind (IRE); 2001	Rainbow Lake (GB)	Rockfest (USA)
Dam Sky Lantern (IRE) 2010	Red Clubs (IRE); 2003	Red Ransom (USA)	Roberto
Dam Sky Lantern (IRE) 2010	Red Clubs (IRE); 2003	Red Ransom (USA)	Arabia
Dam Sky Lantern (IRE) 2010	Red Clubs (IRE); 2003	Two Clubs (GB)	First Trump
Dam Sky Lantern (IRE) 2010	Red Clubs (IRE); 2003	Two Clubs (GB)	Miss Cindy
Dam Sky Lantern (IRE) 2010	Shawanni (GB); 1993	Shareef Dancer (USA)	Northern Dancer (CAN)
Dam Sky Lantern (IRE) 2010	Shawanni (GB); 1993	Shareef Dancer (USA)	Sweet Alliance
Dam Sky Lantern (IRE) 2010	Shawanni (GB); 1993	Negligent (IRE); 1987	Ahonoora (GB)
Dam Sky Lantern (IRE) 2010	Shawanni (GB); 1993	Negligent (IRE); 1987	Negligence (GB) (Family: 5-h)
