= Park Express Stakes =

Flat horse race in Ireland

- Class: Group 3
- Location: Curragh Racecourse; County Kildare, Ireland
- Inaugurated: 2003
- Race type: Flat / Thoroughbred
- Sponsor: Lodge Park Stud
- Website: Curragh

Race information
- Distance: 1 mile (1,609 metres)
- Surface: Turf
- Track: Right-handed
- Qualification: Three-years-old and up fillies and mares
- Weight: 8 st 8 lb (3yo); 9 st 11 lb (4yo+); Penalties; 3 lb for Group winners * * since 1 April last year
- Purse: €68,500 (2024); 1st: €40,415

Park Express Stakes
2026
Celestial Orbit	Princess Child	Faiyum

Previous years
2025
One Look	Ecstatic	Naomi Lapaglia
2024
Brilliant	Alpheratz	Goldana
2023
Insinuendo	Redressed	Kerkiyra
2022
Mother Earth	Insinuendo	Freedom Of Speech
2021
Epona Plays	Parent's Prayer	Sziget

2020-2011
2020
Lemista	Hamariyna	Even So
2019
Normandel	Hand On Heart	Yulong Gold Fairy
2018
Making Light	Panstarr	Elegant Pose
2017
Czabo	Somehow	Flying Fairies
2016
Queen Blossom	Devonshire	Joailliere
2015
Ramone	Afternoon Sunlight	Amulet
2014
Vote Often	Odeliz	Achnaha
2013
Rehn's Nest	Yellow Rosebud	Starbright
2012
Chrysanthemum	Twirl	Princess Sinead
2011
Lolly For Dolly	Gemstone	Banimpire

2010-2003
2010
Pollen	Devoted To You	Latin Love
2009
Oh Goodness Me	Firey Red	Mad About You
2008
Marjalina	Savethisdanceforme	Deauville Vision
2007
Ardbrae Lady	Danehill Music	Truly Mine
2006
Danehill Music	Utterly Heaven	Gemini Gold
2005
Kitty O'Shea	Tropical Lady	Faint Heart
2004
Alexander Goldrun	Blue Reema	Royal Tigress
2003
Wrong Key	Miss Nashwan	Aqualina

The Park Express Stakes is a Group 3 flat horse race in Ireland open to Thoroughbred fillies and mares aged three years or older. It is run over a distance of 1 mile (1,609 metres) at the Curragh in March.

== History ==
The event is named after Park Express, a successful Irish-trained filly in the 1980s. It was established in 2003, and initially held Listed status. The first running was won by Wrong Key. It was promoted to Group 3 level in 2006.

The Park Express Stakes is currently Ireland's first Group race of the year.

== Records ==
Most successful horse:

- no horse has won this race more than once

Leading jockey (4 wins):

- Wayne Lordan – Danehill Music (2006), Lolly for Dolly (2011), Chrysanthemum (2012), Epona Plays (2021)

Leading trainer (4 wins):

- Jim Bolger – Alexander Goldrun (2004), Oh Goodness Me (2009), Rehn's Nest (2013), Normandel (2019)

== Winners ==
Year	Winner	Age	Jockey	Trainer	Time
2003	Wrong Key	4	Kieren Fallon	Kevin Prendergast	1:44.80
2004	Alexander Goldrun	3	Kevin Manning	Jim Bolger	1:51.20
2005	Kitty O'Shea	3	Kieren Fallon	Aidan O'Brien	1:51.40
2006	Danehill Music	3	Wayne Lordan	David Wachman	2:05.60
2007	Ardbrae Lady	4	Johnny Murtagh	Joe Murphy	1:55.40
2008	Marjalina	3	Declan McDonogh	Kevin Prendergast	1:55.97
2009	Oh Goodness Me	3	Davy Moran	Jim Bolger	1:47.03
2010	Pollen	5	Billy Lee	Tommy Stack	1:49.69
2011	Lolly for Dolly	4	Wayne Lordan	Tommy Stack	1:49.42
2012	Chrysanthemum	4	Wayne Lordan	David Wachman	1:47.26
2013	Rehn's Nest	3	Rory Cleary	Jim Bolger	1:56.10
2014	Vote Often	3	Pat Smullen	Dermot Weld	1:49.47
2015	Ramone	5	Shane Foley	Bill Farrell	1:52.70
2016	Queen Blossom	3	Fran Berry	Patrick Prendergast	1:46.88
2017	Czabo (Note: The 2017, 2018, 2019, 2020 and 2021 races took place at Naas)	4	Graham Lee	Mick Channon	1:48.14
2018	Making Light	4	Leigh Roche	Dermot Weld	1:51.10
2019	Normandel	5	Kevin Manning	Jim Bolger	1:49.31
2020	Lemista	3	Chris Hayes	Ger Lyons	1:49.62
2021	Epona Plays	4	Wayne Lordan	Willie McCreery	1:52.78
2022	Mother Earth	4	Ryan Moore	Aidan O'Brien	1:45.09
2023	Insinuendo	6	Billy Lee	Willie McCreery	1:50.15
2024	Brilliant	3	Declan McDonogh	Aidan O'Brien	1:51.68
2025	One Look	4	Billy Lee	Paddy Twomey	1:37.77
2026	Celestial Orbit	4	Joey Sheridan	Joseph O'Brien	1:47.74

== See also ==
- Horse racing in Ireland
- List of Irish flat horse races
