= Almeraq =

British Thoroughbred racehorse

- Sire: Dark Angel
- Grandsire: Acclamation
- Dam: Manaajim
- Damsire: Muhaarar
- Sex: Stallion
- Foaled: 8 February 2022 (age 4)
- Country: Great Britain
- Colour: Bay
- Breeder: Shadwell Racing
- Owner: Shadwell Racing
- Trainer: William Haggas
- Jockey: Jim Crowley, Tom Marquand
- Record: 10: 6–2–0
- Earnings: £1.1 million

Major wins
- Queen Elizabeth II Jubilee Stakes (2026); Haydock Sprint Cup (2026); British Champions Sprint Stakes (2026)

Awards
- Cartier Champion Sprinter (2026); Timeform rating: 126+

Almeraq (foaled 8 February 2022) is a British Thoroughbred racehorse.

He displayed modest performance as a 2- and 3-year old, but in the last race of his 3-year old season he suffered an injury at York Racecourse. Nevertheless, he recovered and greatly improved as a 4-year old, winning three Group 1 races: the Queen Elizabeth II Jubilee Stakes, Haydock Sprint Cup and British Champions Sprint Stakes, all over 6 furlongs.

After his win in the Haydock Sprint Cup, Timeform rated him as the best sprinter in Europe at the time, with a rating of 126+. After his win in the British Champions Sprint Stakes, his connections announced that he would be retired to stud for the 2027 breeding season.

== Racing form ==
The below data is from Timeform, Racing Post. and British Horseracing Authority.

Date	Race name	D(f)	Course	Class	Prize	Odds	Runners	Place	Margin (L)	Winner (Runner-up)	Time	Jockey	Trainer
2024 – two-year-old season
20 September 2024	EBF Maiden Stakes	6	Newbury	4	£3,042	13/2	13	2nd	3/4	Fast Track Harry	1:14.68	Jim Crowley	William Haggas
15 October 2024	EBF Novice Stakes	6	Yarmouth	4	£5,373	8/13F	7	1st	3 3/4	(Winnebago)	1:15.29	Jim Crowley	William Haggas
2025 – three-year-old season
12 June 2025	Charles Lumsden Memorial Novice Stakes	6	Yarmouth	5	£2,028	4/9F	8	2nd	5 1/2	Spy Chief	1:11.81	Jim Crowley	William Haggas
21 July 2025	Gold Cup Trial Handicap	6	Ayr	3	£15,462	2/1F	18	1st	5	(Badri)	1:13.36	Clifford Lee	William Haggas
7 September 2025	Garrowby Stakes	6	York	1 (Listed)		15/8F	9	DNF		Elmonjed	–	Jim Crowley	William Haggas
2026 – four-year-old season
23 May 2026	Cathedral Stakes	6	Salisbury	1 (Listed)	£39,697	7/2JF	10	1st	neck	(Spy Chief)	1:13.56	Harry Davies	William Haggas
20 June 2026	Queen Elizabeth II Jubilee Stakes	6	Ascot	1 (G1)	£567,100	25/1	18	1st	nose	(Satono Reve)	1:11.82	Tom Marquand	William Haggas
11 July 2026	July Cup	6	Newmarket	1 (G1)		11/2	11	9th	8 1/2	Comanche Brave	1:11.43	Tom Marquand	William Haggas
5 September 2026	Haydock Sprint Cup	6	Haydock	1 (G1)	£226,840	9/4F	8	1st	4 1/4	(Paborus)	1:15.00	Tom Marquand	William Haggas
17 October 2026	British Champions Sprint Stakes	6	Ascot	1 (G1)	£283,550	11/10F	16	1st	neck	(Paborus)	1:12.20	Tom Marquand	William Haggas

== Pedigree ==
Pedigree of Almeraq
Sire Dark Angel gr. 2005	Acclamation b. 1999	Royal Applause	Waajib
Sire Dark Angel gr. 2005	Acclamation b. 1999	Royal Applause	Flying Melody
Sire Dark Angel gr. 2005	Acclamation b. 1999	Princess Athena	Ahonoora
Sire Dark Angel gr. 2005	Acclamation b. 1999	Princess Athena	Shopping Wise
Sire Dark Angel gr. 2005	Midnight Angel gr. 1994	Machiavellian	Mr. Prospector
Sire Dark Angel gr. 2005	Midnight Angel gr. 1994	Machiavellian	Coup de Folie
Sire Dark Angel gr. 2005	Midnight Angel gr. 1994	Night At Sea	Night Shift
Sire Dark Angel gr. 2005	Midnight Angel gr. 1994	Night At Sea	Into Harbour
Dam Manaajim b. 2017	Muhaarar b. 2012	Oasis Dream	Green Desert
Dam Manaajim b. 2017	Muhaarar b. 2012	Oasis Dream	Hope
Dam Manaajim b. 2017	Muhaarar b. 2012	Tahrir	Linamix
Dam Manaajim b. 2017	Muhaarar b. 2012	Tahrir	Miss Sacha
Dam Manaajim b. 2017	Queenofthefairies b. 2007	Pivotal	Polar Falcon
Dam Manaajim b. 2017	Queenofthefairies b. 2007	Pivotal	Fearless Revival
Dam Manaajim b. 2017	Queenofthefairies b. 2007	Land of Dreams	Cadeaux Genereux
Dam Manaajim b. 2017	Queenofthefairies b. 2007	Land of Dreams	Sahara Star
