= Saffron Beach =

Irish-bred Thoroughbred racehorse

- Sire: New Bay
- Grandsire: Dubawi
- Dam: Falling Petals
- Damsire: Raven's Pass
- Sex: Filly
- Foaled: 14 February 2018
- Country: Ireland
- Colour: Chestnut
- Breeder: China Horse Club International Ltd
- Owner: Ben Sangster & James Wigan
- Trainer: Jane Chapple-Hyam
- Record: 11: 6-2-0
- Earnings: £742,108

Major wins
- Oh So Sharp Stakes (2020); Atalanta Stakes (2021); Sun Chariot Stakes (2021); Duke of Cambridge Stakes (2022); Prix Rothschild (2022)

Saffron Beach (foaled 14 February 2018) is an Irish-bred, British-trained Thoroughbred racehorse. As a two-year-old in 2020 she was unbeaten in two races including the Group 3 Oh So Sharp Stakes. In the following year she ran second in the 1000 Guineas but then lost her form before returning to her best to win the Atalanta Stakes and the Sun Chariot Stakes. As a four-year-old she added further major successes in the Duke of Cambridge Stakes and the Prix Rothschild.

== Background ==
Saffron Beach is a chestnut filly with a white star bred in Ireland by China Horse Club International Ltd. As a foal in December 2018 she was entered in the Tattersalls Sale and bought for 55,000 guineas by Norris Bloodstock. She was entered in the Tattersalls sales in October and December 2019 and again in July 2020 but was withdrawn on each occasion. She entered the ownership of James Wigan in partnership with Ben Sangster, whose horses race in the name of his wife, Lucy. The filly was sent into training with Jane Chapple-Hyam at Newmarket, Suffolk. Chapple-Hyam's mother Susan was the second wife of Ben Sangster's father Robert.

She was from the first crop of foals sired by New Bay, who won the Prix du Jockey Club and finished third in the Prix de l'Arc de Triomphe as a three-year-old in 2012. Saffron Beach's dam Falling Petals showed modest racing ability, winning one minor race from three starts. Her great-grand-dam Hopespringseternal was a half sister to Miswaki and closely related to Tobougg and the Prix de Diane winner Lacovia. She was descended from the American broodmare Lea Lark (foaled 1945) the female-line ancestor of Southern Halo, Lujain and Peter Davies.

== Racing career ==
=== 2020: two-year-old season ===
Saffron Beach was ridden in both of her races as a two-year-old by Adam Kirby. She began her track career in a maiden race over seven furlongs at Newmarket Racecourse on 26 September when she started at odds of 12/1 and won "readily" by four and a quarter lengths from Wootton Creek after taking the lead a furlong from the finish. Two weeks later, over the same course and distance, the filly was stepped up in class for the Group 3 Oh So Sharp Stakes on soft ground and started the 9/4 favourite in a nine-runner field. After racing in second place, Saffron Beach took the lead a furlong out and kept on well to win by half a length from Thank You Next. After the race Chapple-Hyam said "That was very good and the staff at home have done a wonderful job. She is a quick learner and I’d love to have a crack at the Breeders' Cup Juvenile Turf at Keeneland, if the owners will allow me. We know she is good." Despite her trainer's comments, Saffron Beach did not race again in 2021.

=== 2021: three-year-old season ===
On her three-year-old debut Saffron Beach contested the Nell Gwyn Stakes (a trial race for the 1000 Guineas) over seven furlongs at Newmarket on 14 April when she started at odds of 4/1 and finished second, beaten three quarters of a length by Sacred. In the 1000 Guineas at the same track on 2 May the filly tracked the leaders before staying on well in the closing stages to finish second to Mother Earth, a length behind the winner. She was then stepped up in distance to contest the Epsom Oaks over one and a half miles on 4 June, but after being in contention, she tired badly in the last quarter mile and came home eighth of the fourteen runners behind Snowfall. A drop back in distance for the Falmouth Stakes at Newmarket in July saw little improvement as she finished eleventh of the thirteen runners behind Snow Lantern, beaten twelve lengths by the winner.

On 21 August at Sandown Park Saffron Beach was ridden by Hollie Doyle when she started the 4/1 third choice in the betting behind Indigo Girl (May Hill Stakes) and Auria (Coral Distaff) for the Group 3 Atalanta Stakes. After being in contention from the start, she overtook the front-running Auria two furlongs from the finish and "kept on strongly" to win by two and a quarter lengths from the Dick Hern Fillies' Stakes winner Waliyak. Jane Chapple-Hyam said "She tried hard and it was a great ride from Hollie. She really enjoyed coming up the hill the last two furlongs. We had our hiccup in the Oaks and a hiccup in the Falmouth, where she scoped dirty afterwards, and she has come back here as the filly we know she is. It was important today just because we believe in the horse and I had to drop her back to a Group 3, just to get the horse’s confidence back as much as anything."

Saffron Beach returned to Group 1 class for the Sun Chariot Stakes over one mile on 2 October when she was partnered by William Buick and started the 5/1 third favourite behind Mother Earth and Snow Lantern. The other nine runners included Champers Elysees, Shale, No Speak Alexander, Lavender's Blue (Celebration Mile), Epona Plays (Lanwades Stud Stakes), Fev Rover (Prix du Calvados) and Tahlie (Prix de Sandringham). In a change of tactics, Saffron Beach led from the start, broke clear of the field approaching the final furlong and won in "impressive" style by three lengths from Mother Earth. Chapple-Hyam, who was recording her first win at the highest level, said "It's fantastic to finally have our first group 1 winner and especially for it to be at our local track. That is some compensation for being beaten in the 1000 Guineas, but we knew Saffron Beach was in top shape coming into the race today. The last furlong was a hard slog to watch and the whole race felt like it was two miles instead of one, but it's good to get the group 1 win next to her name... You don't mind waiting if they do it in the end."

== Pedigree ==
Pedigree of Saffron Beach (IRE), chestnut filly, 2018
Sire New Bay (GB) 2012	Dubawi (IRE); 2002	Dubai Millennium (GB)	Seeking The Gold (USA)
Sire New Bay (GB) 2012	Dubawi (IRE); 2002	Dubai Millennium (GB)	Colorado Dancer (IRE)
Sire New Bay (GB) 2012	Dubawi (IRE); 2002	Zomaradah (GB)	Deploy
Sire New Bay (GB) 2012	Dubawi (IRE); 2002	Zomaradah (GB)	Jawaher (IRE)
Sire New Bay (GB) 2012	Cinnamon Bay (GB); 2004	Zamindar (USA)	Gone West
Sire New Bay (GB) 2012	Cinnamon Bay (GB); 2004	Zamindar (USA)	Zaizafon
Sire New Bay (GB) 2012	Cinnamon Bay (GB); 2004	Trellis Bay	Sadler's Wells (USA)
Sire New Bay (GB) 2012	Cinnamon Bay (GB); 2004	Trellis Bay	Bahamian (IRE)
Dam Falling Petals (IRE) 2012	Raven's Pass (USA); 2005	Elusive Quality	Gone West
Dam Falling Petals (IRE) 2012	Raven's Pass (USA); 2005	Elusive Quality	Touch of Greatness
Dam Falling Petals (IRE) 2012	Raven's Pass (USA); 2005	Ascutney	Lord At War (ARG)
Dam Falling Petals (IRE) 2012	Raven's Pass (USA); 2005	Ascutney	Right Word
Dam Falling Petals (IRE) 2012	Infinite Spirit (USA); 1999	Maria's Mon	Wavering Monarch (FR)
Dam Falling Petals (IRE) 2012	Infinite Spirit (USA); 1999	Maria's Mon	Carlotta Maria
Dam Falling Petals (IRE) 2012	Infinite Spirit (USA); 1999	Eternal Reve	Diesis (GB)
Dam Falling Petals (IRE) 2012	Infinite Spirit (USA); 1999	Eternal Reve	Northern Eternity (Family: 16-g)

- Saffron Beach is inbred 4 × 4 to Gone West, meaning that this stallion appears twice in the fourth generation of her pedigree.
