= Snowfall (horse) =

Japanese-bred Thoroughbred racehorse

- Racing silks of Mr Derrick Smith
- Sire: Deep Impact
- Grandsire: Sunday Silence
- Dam: Best In The World
- Damsire: Galileo
- Sex: Filly
- Foaled: 9 February 2018
- Died: 11 January 2022 (aged 3); Ballydoyle, Ireland
- Country: Japan
- Colour: Bay
- Breeder: Roncon, Chelston Ire & Wynatt
- Owner: Derrick Smith & Mrs John Magnier & Michael Tabor
- Trainer: Aidan O'Brien
- Record: 14: 5-1-2
- Earnings: £885,696

Major wins
- Musidora Stakes (2021); Epsom Oaks (2021); Irish Oaks (2021); Yorkshire Oaks (2021)

Awards
- Cartier Champion Three-year-old Filly (2021)

Snowfall (9 February 2018 – 11 January 2022) was a Japanese-bred Thoroughbred racehorse who won the 2021 Epsom Oaks, Irish Oaks, and Yorkshire Oaks. She showed promising but unremarkable form as a two-year-old in 2020, winning one minor race from seven starts. The following year she improved dramatically, winning the Group 3 Musidora Stakes and then taking the Epsom Oaks by a record margin of sixteen lengths. She went on to win emphatic victories in the Irish Oaks and the Yorkshire Oaks over older horses.

Snowfall was euthanized on 11 January 2022 following an injury in her stable.

== Background ==
Snowfall was a bay filly with a white sock on her left hind leg, bred in Japan by Roncon, Chelston Ire & Wynatt, a breeding company associated with John Magnier's Coolmore Stud. The filly was sent into training with Aidan O'Brien at Ballydoyle and raced in the colours of the Coolmore partners Derrick Smith, Susan Magnier and Michael Tabor.

She was from the eleventh crop of foals sired by Deep Impact, who was the Japanese Horse of the Year in 2005 and 2006, winning races including the Tokyo Yushun, Tenno Sho, Arima Kinen and Japan Cup. Deep Impact's other progeny include Gentildonna, Harp Star, Kizuna, A Shin Hikari, Marialite and Saxon Warrior. Snowfall's dam Best In The World, showed high-class racing ability, winning two of her nine races including the Give Thanks Stakes, and was a full-sister to Found. Her dam Red Evie won the Lockinge Stakes and was related to the Ascot Gold Cup winner Random Shot.

== Racing career ==
=== 2020: two-year-old season ===
Snowfall made her racecourse debut in a five and a half furlong maiden race at Navan Racecourse on 10 June in which she was ridden by Seamie Heffernan, finishing third behind Frenetic and Mother Earth (also trained by O'Brien). Eighteen days later she started 4/7 favourite for a maiden at the Curragh but came home eighth of the nine runners after being badly hampered in the last quarter mile. Wayne Lordan took the ride when Snowfall started favourite for a similar event over the same course and distance on 28 July and recorded her first success as she took the lead a furlong from the finish and won "readily" by half a length from Sister Rosetta.

On 8 August Snowfall was stepped up in class for the Group 3 Silver Flash Stakes at Leopardstown Racecourse. With Lordan again in the saddle she started the 3/1 second favourite but never looked likely to win after a slow start and finished fourth of the eight runners behind her stablemate Shale. Despite her defeat the filly was moved up in grade again for the Group 2 Debutante Stakes on soft ground at the Curragh where she was ridden by Lordan and started at odds of 7/1 in an eight-runner field. She raced in second place behind her stablemate Finest before taking the lead two furlongs out but faded badly in the closing stages and came home fifth behind Pretty Gorgeous, Shale, Mother Earth and Meala. Snowfall was then promoted to the highest level to contest the Group 1 Moyglare Stud Stakes at the Curragh on 13 September. Starting a 25/1 outsider, she raced in second place for most of the way before dropping out of contention in the final furlong and finishing ninth behind Shale, beaten ten lengths by the winner.

For her final run of the year Snowfall was sent to England and moved up in distance for the Group 1 Fillies' Mile at Newmarket Racecourse on 9 October when she started a 50/1 outsider and finished eighth behind Pretty Gorgeous. She was initially reported to have finished in third place, while her stablemate Mother Earth had finished eighth, but in a bizarre postscript to the race it was revealed that the two Aidan O'Brien runners had carried the wrong number cloths and been ridden by the wrong jockeys, meaning that the filly who finished third was actually Mother Earth.

=== 2021: three-year-old season ===
==== Spring ====
On her first appearance as a three-year-old, Snowfall was sent to York Racecourse in England for the Group 3 Musidora Stakes (a trial race for the Epsom Oaks) over ten furlongs on 12 May and started a 14/1 outsider in a seven-runner field. Ridden by Ryan Moore she led from the start and drew away from her opponents in the final furlong to win by three and three quarter lengths from the favoured Noon Star, with Teona taking third place ahead of Mystery Angel. After the race Moore said "It wasn't the plan to lead, but she took advantage of the situation and was good and smooth and went through the gears well... She always looked like a nice filly," he said. "She showed a good attitude and picked up well. It looked like a strong race beforehand and I am very happy with her. She ran in all the best races last year and it didn't happen for her, but she certainly has plenty of class."

==== Summer ====
On 4 June Snowfall, with Frankie Dettori in the saddle, was one of fourteen fillies to contest the 243rd running of the Oaks Stakes (sponsored by Cazoo) over one and a half miles on good to soft ground on a rainy day at Epsom Racecourse. She started the 11/2 third favourite behind her stablemate Santa Barbara and the Cheshire Oaks winner Dubai Fountain while the other contenders included Zeyaadah (Montrose Stakes), Teona, Mystery Angel, Saffron Beach, Divinely (Flame of Tara Stakes) and Sherbet Lemon (Lingfield Oaks Trial). Dettori settled the filly towards the rear as Mystery Angel set the pace and was still well back in the field as the runners entered the straight and tracked across to race up the stands side rail. She then made rapid progress, bumping Sherbet Lemon as she did so, overtook Mystery Angel two furlongs out, and drew right away from her rivals in the closing stages to win by a record margin of sixteen lengths. Dettori, who was winning his 21st Classic at the age of 50 commented "I’ve won many Classics but not one as easy as that. I wanted a better position but they were going way too fast. Everybody was fighting to get in the first three so I let them get on with it. I thought out there I had everything beat. In front they had all gone and I had the luxury to take one set of my goggles down. I thought, ‘don’t be clever, just cut through the middle’, and I did. The only horse I hadn't seen yet was Santa Barbara and I had a quick glance and I was already five in front. She took off, as simple as that."

Snowfall's next race was the Irish Oaks over one and a half miles at the Curragh on 17 July and she started the 2/7 favourite against seven opponents including Willow (Naas Oaks Trial), Nicest (third in the Ribblesdale Stakes) and Divinely (Flame of Tara Stakes). Ridden by Moore, she raced in fourth place as her stablemate La Joconde set the pace, before moving up to take the lead entering the last quarter mile. She drew away in the closing stages and won in "impressive" style by eight and a half lengths from Divinely. After the race O'Brien said "She's an unbelievable filly with an unbelievable pedigree. She has stamina, she has speed, and when the gallop was even, Ryan said she came alive turning in. She's done very well from Epsom physically, she's got very big and strong. Ryan said she has a lot of speed. She goes very strong and finishes out very well. We always thought fast ground was her thing."

On 19 August Snowfall started the 8/15 favourite for the Yorkshire Oaks when she was matched against older fillies and mares for the first time. Her main rival appeared to be Wonderful Tonight while the other five runners were Albaflora (Buckhounds Stakes), Eshaada (Fillies' Trial Stakes), Loving Dream (Ribblesdale Stakes), Divinely and La Joconde. She started slowly and raced towards the rear of the field in the early stages but moved up in the straight and took the lead approaching the last quarter mile. She quickly opened up a clear advantage before being eased down by Moore in the final strides to win by four lengths from Albaflora. Moore commented "She was exceptional really. It was a truly-run race, but it fell apart quickly and she was left in front with two and a half to run. She's very impressive and to me she's improved since the last time I rode her. Hopefully she'll continue to improve." Aidan O'Brien said "She's a lovely filly, always done everything very easily. She quickens very well and she's gone really laid back now. She's starting to thrive and is starting to put on weight. She's going to be ready for the autumn."

==== Autumn ====
For her next start Snowfall was sent to France for the Prix Vermeille over 2400 metres at Longchamp Racecourse and started the 1/5 favourite in a seven-runner field. After racing in mid-division she made steady progress in the straight but never looked likely to reel in Teona and sustained her first defeat of the season as she was beaten one and a half lengths into second place. In the Prix de l'Arc de Triomphe over the same course and distance three weeks later the filly started the 3.8/1 favourite but after moving into contention in the straight she was unable to make further progress and came home sixth behind Torquator Tasso, beaten four and three quarter lengths by the winner. Snowfall made a quick return to the track and started 8/11 favourite for the British Champions Fillies and Mares Stakes at Ascot Racecourse on 16 October. She overcame a slow start to make progress early in the straight but hung to the right in the closing stages and finished third behind Eshaada and Albaflora.

On 10 November Snowfall was named Champion Three-year-old Filly at the Cartier Racing Awards.

Snowfall was euthanized on 11 January 2022 due to a serious pelvic injury she had suffered in her stable a few weeks earlier. O'Brien said: "We did everything we could for her but it wasn’t to be. She is a massive loss to everyone here, from a racing and breeding perspective – she was such a high-class mare."

== Racing Statistic ==
The following racing form is based on information available on racingpost.com.

Date	Track	Race	Grade	Distance	Entry	Finish	Time (Note: Official time of winning horse. The time written in grey doesn't belong to Snowfall.)	Jockey	Winner (Runner-up)
2020 – two-year-old season
10 Jun	Navan	Debut 2yo race		5½ furlongs	14	3rd	1m 10.34s	Seamie Heffernan	Frenetic
28 Jun	Curragh	2yo Maiden		7 furlongs	9	8th	1m 25.64s	Seamie Heffernan	Aunty Bridy
19 Jul	Curragh	2yo Maiden		7 furlongs	10	1st	1m 27.31s	Wayne Lordan	(Sister Rosetta)
6 Aug	Leopardstown	Silver Flash Stakes	GIII	7 furlongs	8	4th	1m 27.69s	Wayne Lordan	Shale
22 Aug	Curragh	Debutante Stakes	GII	7 furlongs	8	5th	1m 28.53s	Wayne Lordan	Pretty Gorgeous
13 Sep	Curragh	Moyglare Stud Stakes	GI	7 furlongs	13	9th	1m 27.19s	Wayne Lordan	Shale
9 Oct	Newmarket	Fillies' Mile	GI	1 mile	10	8th	1m 39.10s	William Buick	Pretty Gorgeous
2021 – three-year-old season
12 May	York	Musidora Stakes	GIII	1 m 2½ furlongs	7	1st	2m 15.18s	Ryan Moore	(Noon Star)
4 Jun	Epsom	Epsom Oaks	GI	1 m 4 furlongs	14	1st	2m 42.67s	Frankie Dettori	(Mystery Angel)
17 Jul	Curragh	Irish Oaks	GI	1 m 4 furlongs	8	1st	2m 34.36s	Ryan Moore	(Divinely)
19 Aug	York	Yorkshire Oaks	GI	1 m 4 furlongs	7	1st	2m 26.61s	Ryan Moore	(Albaflora)
12 Sep	Longchamp	Prix Vermeille	GI	1 m 4 furlongs	7	2nd	2m 31.99s	Frankie Dettori	Teona
3 Oct	Longchamp	Prix de l'Arc de Triomphe	GI	1 m 4 furlongs	14	6th	2m 37.62s	Ryan Moore	Torquator Tasso
16 Oct	Ascot	British Champions Fillies and Mares Stakes	GI	1 m 4 furlongs	8	3rd	2m 34.05s	Ryan Moore	Eshaada

== Pedigree ==
Pedigree of Snowfall (JPN), bay filly 2018
Sire Deep Impact (JPN) 2002	Sunday Silence (USA); 1986	Halo	Hail to Reason
Sire Deep Impact (JPN) 2002	Sunday Silence (USA); 1986	Halo	Cosmah
Sire Deep Impact (JPN) 2002	Sunday Silence (USA); 1986	Wishing Well	Understanding
Sire Deep Impact (JPN) 2002	Sunday Silence (USA); 1986	Wishing Well	Mountain Flower
Sire Deep Impact (JPN) 2002	Wind in Her Hair (IRE); 1991	Alzao (USA)	Lyphard
Sire Deep Impact (JPN) 2002	Wind in Her Hair (IRE); 1991	Alzao (USA)	Lady Rebecca (GB)
Sire Deep Impact (JPN) 2002	Wind in Her Hair (IRE); 1991	Burghclere (GB)	Busted
Sire Deep Impact (JPN) 2002	Wind in Her Hair (IRE); 1991	Burghclere (GB)	Highclere
Dam Best In The World (IRE) 2013	Galileo (IRE); 1998	Sadler's Wells (USA)	Northern Dancer (CAN)
Dam Best In The World (IRE) 2013	Galileo (IRE); 1998	Sadler's Wells (USA)	Fairy Bridge
Dam Best In The World (IRE) 2013	Galileo (IRE); 1998	Urban Sea (USA)	Miswaki
Dam Best In The World (IRE) 2013	Galileo (IRE); 1998	Urban Sea (USA)	Allegretta (GB)
Dam Best In The World (IRE) 2013	Red Evie (IRE); 2003	Intikhab (USA)	Red Ransom
Dam Best In The World (IRE) 2013	Red Evie (IRE); 2003	Intikhab (USA)	Crafty Example
Dam Best In The World (IRE) 2013	Red Evie (IRE); 2003	Malafemmena	Nordico (USA)
Dam Best In The World (IRE) 2013	Red Evie (IRE); 2003	Malafemmena	Martinova (Family: 1-m)
