= Flame of Tara Stakes =

Flat horse race in Ireland

Flame Of Tara Stakes
2026
Sea Of Rain	Ballyskeagh	Damsel In Distress

Previous years
2025
Queen Of Hawaii	Moments Of Joy	Ridersinthesky
2024
Dreamy	Fiery Lucy	Alla Stella
2023
Opera Singer	Brilliant	Kalispera
2022
Aspen Grove	Shelton	Eternal Silence
2021
Magical Lagoon	Albula	She's Trouble

2020-2011
2020
Divinely	Ahandfulofsummers	Ubuntu
2019
Cayenne Pepper	So Wonderful	A New Dawn
2018
Just Wonderful	Peach Tree	Fleeting
2017
Liquid Amber	Ballet Shoes	Sometimesadiamond
2016
Sea Of Grace	Eziyra	Butterflies
2015
Kind Of Magic	How High The Moon	Leafy Shade
2014
Jack Naylor	Legatissimo	Together Forever
2013
Avenue Gabriel	Ballybacka Queen	Minorette
2012
Spinacre	Reglisse	Rasmeyaa
2011
Coral Wave	Lady Wingshot	Rubina

2010-2003
2010
Chrysanthemum	Cambina	Aris
2009
Corcovada	Sense Of Purpose	Akdarena
2008
Dreamtheimpossible	Forest Storm	Tanoura
2007
Forthefirstime	Longing To Dance	Bett's Spirit
2006
Evening Time	Theann	Newgate Lodge
2005
Alexander Alliance	Kamarinskaya	Key Rose
2004
Bibury Flyer	Virginia Waters	Gouache
2003
Kanisfluh	Dangle	Summer Sunset

The Flame Of Tara Stakes is a Group 3 flat horse race in Ireland open to two-year-old thoroughbred fillies. It is run at the Curragh over a distance of 1 mile (1,609 metres), and it is scheduled to take place each year in late August or early September.

The race was first run in 2003 and was awarded Group 3 status in 2016.

The race is named in tribute to the Irish broodmare, Flame of Tara, who was dam of 11 winners including Salsabil and Marju. From 1997 to 2002, the name of Flame of Tara was used in conjunction with the Tyros Stakes.

== Records ==
Leading jockey since 2003 (5 wins):

- Fran Berry - Forthefirstime (2007), Dreamtheimpossible (2008), Corcovada (2009), Chrysanthemum (2010), Jack Naylor (2014)

Leading trainer since 2003 (5 wins):

- Aidan O'Brien - Kind Of Magic (2015), Just Wonderful (2018), Divinely (2020), Opera Singer (2023), Dreamy (2024)

== Winners ==
Year	Winner	Jockey	Trainer	Time
2003	Kanisfluh	Wayne Lordan	Tommy Stack	1:15.30
2004	Bibury Flyer	Tony Culhane	Mick Channon	1:17.30
2005	Alexander Alliance	Wayne Lordan	Tommy Stack	1:18.10
2006	Evening Time	Declan McDonogh	Kevin Prendergast	1:20.70
2007	Forthefirstime	Fran Berry	John Oxx	1:11.60
2008	Dreamtheimpossible	Fran Berry	David Wachman	1:54.38
2009	Corcovada	Fran Berry	Edward P Harty	1:53.20
2010	Chrysanthemum	Fran Berry	David Wachman	1:42.12
2011	Coral Wave	Declan McDonogh	Paddy Prendergast jr	1:43.30
2012	Spinacre	Chris Hayes	Kevin Prendergast	1:43.52
2013	Avenue Gabriel	Chris Hayes	Paul Deegan	1:37.03
2014	Jack Naylor	Fran Berry	Jessica Harrington	1:39.15
2015	Kind Of Magic	Seamie Heffernan	Aidan O'Brien	1:43.27
2016	Sea Of Grace	Declan McDonogh	John Oxx	1:37.90
2017	Liquid Amber	Billy Lee	Willie McCreery	1:39.17
2018	Just Wonderful	Donnacha O'Brien	Aidan O'Brien	1:38.78
2019	Cayenne Pepper	Shane Foley	Jessica Harrington	1:39.39
2020	Divinely	Wayne Lordan	Aidan O'Brien	1:48.77
2021	Magical Lagoon	Shane Foley	Jessica Harrington	1:41.69
2022	Aspen Grove	Mark Enright	Fozzy Stack	1:40.75
2023	Opera Singer	Seamie Heffernan	Aidan O'Brien	1:38.40
2024	Dreamy	Ryan Moore	Aidan O'Brien	1:39.78
2025	Queen Of Hawaii	Dylan Browne McMonagle	Joseph O'Brien	1:41.93
2026	Sea Of Rain	Colin Keane	Jim Bolger	1:39.21

== See also ==
- Horse racing in Ireland
- List of Irish flat horse races
