= Alcohol Free (horse) =

Irish-bred Thoroughbred racehorse

- Racing silks of Jeff Smith
- Sire: No Nay Never
- Grandsire: Scat Daddy
- Dam: Plying
- Damsire: Hard Spun
- Sex: Filly
- Foaled: 23 March 2018
- Country: Ireland
- Colour: Bay
- Breeder: Churchtown House Stud
- Owner: Jeff Smith; Yu Long Investments
- Trainer: Andrew Balding; Gai Waterhouse and Adrian Botti
- Record: 20: 6-1-3
- Earnings: £2,006,010

Major wins
- Cheveley Park Stakes (2020); Fred Darling Stakes (2021); Coronation Stakes (2021); Sussex Stakes (2021); July Cup (2022)

Alcohol Free (foaled 23 March 2018) is an Irish-bred, British-trained Thoroughbred racehorse. She was one of the best juvenile fillies in Europe in 2020 when she won two of her three races including the Cheveley Park Stakes. She improved as a three-year-old, winning the Fred Darling Stakes, Coronation Stakes and Sussex Stakes. As a four-year-old in 2022 she was dropped back to sprint distances and added a further Group One success when winning the July Cup.

== Background ==
Alcohol Free is a bay filly with no white markings bred in Ireland by the County Cork based Churchtown House Stud. She was offered for sale at the Goffs' November Foal Sale in 2018 and was bought for €40,000 by David Bowe on behalf of Jeff Smith's Hampshire-based Littleton Stud. Bowe later commented "Jeff is an owner-breeder primarily, but periodically we buy a few. I really liked her... She was a smashing filly, by a good sire and a good model so I bought her. We loved her from the moment we bought her, she went on to be a cracking looking yearling and she was always a keeper". She was sent into training with Andrew Balding at Kingsclere.

She is from the third crop of foals sired by No Nay Never, an American horse who had his greatest success in Europe where he won the Norfolk Stakes and the Prix Morny as a juvenile in 2013. His other foals have included Ten Sovereigns. Alcohol Free's dam Plying was a Kentucky-bred mare who showed some racing ability in France, winning two of her six races. She is a female-line descendant of the American broodmare Intriguing, making her a relative of Rhythm, Super Saver and Woodman. Further back, she is also a direct matrilineal descendant of superstar mare La Troienne, in common among others with 2003 US Horse of the Year Mineshaft, 2020 Japanese Triple Crown winner Contrail, Kentucky Derby winners Smarty Jones (2004) and Super Saver (2010), and 2021 Belmont Stakes winner Essential Quality.

== Racing career ==
=== 2020: two-year-old season ===
On 15 August 2020, Alcohol Free was ridden by Oisin Murphy when she made her racecourse debut in a novice race (for horses with no more than two previous wins) over six furlongs on good to soft ground at Newbury Racecourse and started at odds of 8.5/1 in a nine-runner field. She recovered from a poor start to overtake the front-running favourite Al Saariyah a furlong from the finish and won "readily" by one and three quarter lengths. The filly was then stepped up in class to contest the Group 3 Dick Poole Fillies' Stakes over the same distance at Salisbury Racecourse on 3 September. Ridden by Rob Hornby she raced in mid-division before making good progress in the last quarter mile but failed by three quarters of a length to overhaul the favourite Happy Romance.

Murphy took the ride when Alcohol Free was moved up to the highest class for the Group 1 Cheveley Park Stakes at Newmarket Racecourse on 26 September. She started the 7/2 second favourite behind the Irish-trained Miss Amulet (winner of the Lowther Stakes) in an eight-runner field which also included Happy Romance, Dandalla (Duchess of Cambridge Stakes) and Umm Kulthum (Firth of Clyde Stakes). Alcohol Free took the lead soon after the start and although she was never able to establish a clear advantage she repelled several challengers and won the race by half a length and a head from Miss Amulet and Umm Kulthum. After the race Murphy said "She's a super filly. She's a group 1 winner now and certainly fits into the One Thousand Guineas category as she hits the line well and also relaxes. Andrew has done a top job with her because he's had to carefully manage her training regime. She's very generous at home, and he's kept a lid on her."

In the official European classification of for 2020 Alcohol Free was given a rating of 112, making her the fourth the best two-year-old filly of the season, behind Campanelle, Pretty Gorgeous and Shale.

=== 2021: three-year-old season ===
==== Spring ====
On her first appearance as a three-year-old Alcohol Free started the 9/4 favourite in a seventeen-runner field for the Group 3 Fred Darling Stakes over seven furlongs at Newbury Racecourse on 18 April. With Murphy in the saddle she tracked the leaders before taking the lead approaching the final furlong and held of the late challenge of Statement to win by a short head. Andrew Balding commented "We expect her to improve a whole load as she's backward in her coat and hasn't done a huge amount of work at home... She's got a massive engine which is what you need in a racehorse".

On 2 May Alcohol Free started at odds of 10/1 in an eleven-runner field for the 208th running of the 1000 Guineas over the Rowley Mile at Newmarket. After racing in mid-division she made steady progress in the last quarter mile but was unable to reel in the leaders and came home fifth behind Mother Earth, Saffron Beach, Fev Rover and Santa Barbara beaten two lengths by the winner.

==== Summer ====
In the Coronation Stakes over one mile on heavy ground in driving rain at Royal Ascot on 18 June Alcohol Free started the 11/2 third favourite behind Pretty Gorgeous and Mother Earth in an eleven-runner field which also included Shale, Fev Rover, Empress Josephine, Snow Lantern and Novemba (German 1000 Guineas). After racing in mid-division Alcohol Free made progress in the straight, gained the advantage from the front-running Novemba inside the final furlong and won one and a half lengths and a neck from Snow Lantern and Mother Earth. Shortly after the finish she jinked to the right and unseated Murphy. "We were a bit concerned when all the rain came, because her stamina wasn't guaranteed... We have worked her at home plenty of times on soft ground, it doesn’t inconvenience her and she travels very strongly. It was just whether she would see out the final furlong, and I was very grateful that she really powered home."

At Newmarket on 9 July Alcohol Free started 5/2 favourite for the Falmouth Stakes but after leading for most of the way she was overtaken in the final strides and finished third beaten half a length and a neck by Snow Lantern and Mother Earth. At Goodwood Racecourse nineteen days later the filly was matched against male opponents and older horses in the Sussex Stakes. Racing on soft ground she started 7/2 second favourite behind Poetic Flare in a nine-runner field which also included Order of Australia, Snow Lantern, Tilsit (Summer Mile Stakes) and Century Dream (Celebration Mile). Alcohol Free raced in mid-division before making rapid progress on the outside in the straight, taking the lead inside the final furlong and winning by one and three quarter lengths from Poetic Flare. Recalling his previous success in the race, which happened when Chief Singer triumphed in 1984, Jeff Smith said "I had jet-black hair and no worries in the world. I thought it was easy and that I’d come back and do it again. She’s something else and the way she has won is incredible. It wasn’t so much the opposition, I was more concerned that we did not have a repeat of the Falmouth where she got left in the lead having broken too well. She needs to get cover and something to aim at. Then she got bumped around and pushed back, but then the way she picked up showed what she really is."

==== Autumn ====
Alcohol Free was stepped up in distance on 18 August at York Racecourse and started 9/2 third favourite for the International Stakes over ten furlongs. She never looked likely win and tired in the closing stages to come home sixth of the seven runners behind Mishriff. On her final run of the year the filly dropped back to a mile for the Queen Elizabeth II Stakes at Ascot when she went off at odds of 10/1 but made little impact and finished eighth of the ten runners behind Baaeed, beaten eight lengths by the winner.

=== 2022: four-year-old season ===
Alcohol Free ran five times in the 2022 season, ridden in all her races by Hornby. She achieved her fourth Group One success in the July Cup over six furlongs at Newmarket, her only win of the season. In November 2022 she was sold at Tattersalls for 5.4 million guineas to an Australian racing syndicate.

=== 2023: Australia ===
In 2023 Alcohol Free went into training with Gai Waterhouse & Adrian Bott at Kensington, New South Wales. She raced five times in Australia without success, before returning to Britain in January 2024 in order to be covered by Frankel.

== Pedigree ==
Pedigree of Alcohol Free (IRE), bay filly, 2018
Sire No Nay Never (USA) 2011	Scat Daddy (USA); 2004	Johannesburg	Hennessy
Sire No Nay Never (USA) 2011	Scat Daddy (USA); 2004	Johannesburg	Myth
Sire No Nay Never (USA) 2011	Scat Daddy (USA); 2004	Love Style	Mr Prospector
Sire No Nay Never (USA) 2011	Scat Daddy (USA); 2004	Love Style	Likeable Style
Sire No Nay Never (USA) 2011	Cat's Eye Witness (USA); 2003	Elusive Quality	Gone West
Sire No Nay Never (USA) 2011	Cat's Eye Witness (USA); 2003	Elusive Quality	Hopespringseternal
Sire No Nay Never (USA) 2011	Cat's Eye Witness (USA); 2003	Comical Cat	Exceller
Sire No Nay Never (USA) 2011	Cat's Eye Witness (USA); 2003	Comical Cat	Six Months Long
Dam Plying (USA) 2010	Hard Spun (USA); 2004	Danzig	Northern Dancer (CAN)
Dam Plying (USA) 2010	Hard Spun (USA); 2004	Danzig	Pas de Nom
Dam Plying (USA) 2010	Hard Spun (USA); 2004	Turkish Tryst	Turkoman
Dam Plying (USA) 2010	Hard Spun (USA); 2004	Turkish Tryst	Darbyvail
Dam Plying (USA) 2010	Nasaieb (IRE); 1997	Fairy King (USA)	Northern Dancer (CAN)
Dam Plying (USA) 2010	Nasaieb (IRE); 1997	Fairy King (USA)	Fairy Bridge
Dam Plying (USA) 2010	Nasaieb (IRE); 1997	Atyaaf (USA)	Irish River (FR)
Dam Plying (USA) 2010	Nasaieb (IRE); 1997	Atyaaf (USA)	Bank On Love (Family 1-x)

- Through her dam, Alcohol Free is inbred 4 × 4 to Northern Dancer, meaning that this stallion appears twice in the fourth generation of her pedigree.
