= Jim Crowley (jockey) =

English jockey

Jim Crowley (born 14 July 1978) is an English retired jockey who was British flat racing Champion Jockey in 2016. He rode as first jockey for Hamdan Al-Maktoum's Shadwell racing operation from 2016 until an injury sustained in 2025 ended his career as a jockey.

== Background ==
Crowley was born in Ascot and as a child competed in pony racing, including the Shetland Pony Grand National at the London International Horse Show. He rode as an amateur flat race jockey before switching to National Hunt racing, riding for the stable of Sue Smith in West Yorkshire.

== Career on the flat ==
Having ridden approximately 300 winners over jumps, Crowley returned to flat racing when he was 27, riding for his sister-in-law, Amanda Perrett at Pulborough. In 2010 he became stable jockey for Ralph Beckett. His first Group win came in October 2006 when he rode Hawridge Prince to victory for Rod Millman in the Group 3 Jockey Club Cup at Newmarket. His first Group 1 win was with the Karl Burke-trained Lord Shanakill in the 2009 Prix Jean Prat at Chantilly in France. Crowley won the British Champion Jockeys title in 2016, beating the 2015 champion, Silvestre de Sousa, into second place and breaking the record for most winners ridden in a month with 46 victories in September. In November 2016 Crowley was announced as the new number one jockey to leading owner Hamdan al-Maktoum's Shadwell racing operation. His retainer brought him more Group 1 victories and increased prize money at the expense of chasing winners for a second champion jockey title. Shadwell Group 1 winners included the sprinter Battaash, Hukum and Baaeed. Crowley's winning ride on Hukum in the Group 1 King George VI and Queen Elizabeth Stakes at Ascot in July 2023 proved controversial as the jockey was banned for 20 days and fined £10,000 under the new whip rules for having used his whip nine times during the race, three times over the six allowed.

In September 2025, Crowley was riding Almeraq in the Garrowby Stakes at York when a fall left him with internal bleeding and leg and pelvic fractures. He underwent five operations over the next ten months and did not regain full race-riding fitness. He announced his retirment in August 2026, saying: "I've had the privilege of riding some of the finest horses in the world and winning races that, as a young lad, I could only dream about". Having completed training modules, he said he was going to gain experience in various yards and then start training on his own account.

== Personal life ==
Crowley is married to Lucinda Harwood, daughter of former trainer Guy Harwood, and has two daughters and a son. He lives in West Sussex.

== Major wins ==
(United Kingdom) Great Britain

- British Champion Fillies & Mares Stakes - (2) - Madame Chiang (2014), Eshaada (2021)
- Champion Stakes - (1) Anmaat (2024)
- Commonwealth Cup - (1) - Eqtidaar (2018)
- Coronation Cup - (1) Hukum (2022)
- Eclipse Stakes - (1) - Ulysses (2017)
- Falmouth Stakes - (1) - Nazeef (2020)
- Haydock Sprint Cup - (1) - Minzaal (2022)
- International Stakes - (2) - Ulysses (2017), Baaeed (2022)
- King George VI and Queen Elizabeth Stakes - (1) - Hukum (2023)
- King's Stand Stakes - (2) - Prohibit (2011), Battaash (2020)
- Lockinge Stakes - (1) - Baaeed (2022)
- Nassau Stakes - (1) - Al Husn (2023)
- Nunthorpe Stakes - (2) - Battaash (2019, 2020)
- Prince of Wales's Stakes - (1) - Mostahdaf (2023)
- Queen Anne Stakes - (1) - Baaeed (2022)
- Queen Elizabeth II Stakes - (1) - Baaeed (2021)
- Sun Chariot Stakes - (1) Nazeef (2020)
- Sussex Stakes - (3) - Here Comes When (2017), Mohaather (2020), Baaeed (2022)

France

- Prix de l'Abbaye de Longchamp - (1) - Battaash (2017)
- Prix d'Ispahan - (1) - Anmaat (2023)
- Prix Jean Prat - (1) - Lord Shanakill (2009)
- Prix du Moulin de Longchamp - (1) - Baaeed (2021)

Italy

- Gran Premio Merano - (1) - Masini (2004)
