= Adayar (horse) =

Irish-bred Thoroughbred racehorse (born 2018)

- Racing silks of Godolphin
- Sire: Frankel
- Grandsire: Galileo
- Dam: Anna Salai
- Damsire: Dubawi
- Sex: Colt
- Foaled: 31 March 2018
- Country: Ireland
- Colour: Bay
- Breeder: Godolphin
- Owner: Godolphin
- Trainer: Charlie Appleby
- Record: 13: 5-4-1
- Earnings: £1,479,602

Major wins
- Epsom Derby (2021); King George VI and Queen Elizabeth Stakes (2021); Gordon Richards Stakes (2023); Timeform rating: 131
- Last updated on 19 October 2022

Adayar (foaled 31 March 2018) is an Irish-bred, British-trained Thoroughbred racehorse. He showed promise as a two-year-old in 2020, winning the second of his two starts by nine lengths. In the following year he finished second in both the Sandown Classic Trial and the Lingfield Derby Trial before winning the Derby. On his next start, he became the first Derby winner in 20 years to follow up with a victory in the King George VI and Queen Elizabeth Stakes. Adayar, now retired and a current sire, is a son of the top stallion Frankel.

== Background ==
Adayar is a bay colt bred in Ireland by Sheikh Mohammed's Godolphin organisation. He was sent into training with Charlie Appleby at Moulton Paddocks in Newmarket, Suffolk. The horse was from the fifth crop of foals sired by Frankel. Adayar's dam Anna Salai was a high-class racemare who won the Prix de la Grotte and finished second in the Irish 1000 Guineas.

Anna Salai is the name of a major road in Chennai and the Adayar is a river in the same city.

== Racing career ==
=== 2020: two-year-old season ===
On both of his starts in 2020, Adayar was ridden by William Buick. The colt made his racecourse debut in a maiden race at Nottingham Racecourse over eight and a half furlongs on soft ground on 14 October when he started the 11/5 favourite in an eleven-runner field. After looking outpaced and stumbling at half way he stayed on well in the closing stages but never looked likely to win and came home fourth behind Set Point, beaten six and a half lengths by the winner. Two weeks later, over the same course and distance, Adayer started at odds of 3/1 for a similar event and recorded his first success as he took the lead three furlongs from the finish and drew away in the closing stages to win "comfortably" by nine lengths.

=== 2021: three-year-old season ===
For his first appearance as a three-year-old, Adayar was stepped up in class and distance for the bet365 Classic Trial over ten furlongs at Sandown Park on 23 April when he started the 8/1 fourth choice in a ten-runner field. Ridden by James Doyle he started slowly but made steady progress in the last three furlongs (despite losing a shoe) to take second place, half a length behind the William Haggas-trained winner Alenquer. Buick was in the saddle two weeks later when the colt started 6/5 favourite for the Novibet Derby Trial Stakes over 1 1/2 miles at Lingfield Park. He recovered from another slow start to track the leaders but despite staying on well in the closing stages he was beaten into second place by Third Realm, beaten one and a quarter lengths by the winner.

On 5 June Adayar was one of eleven colts to contest the 242nd running of the Derby over 1 1/2 miles at Epsom Racecourse, starting at relatively long odds of 16/1. The Coolmore Stud representative Bolshoi Ballet started favourite, while the other nine runners included Mac Swiney, Gear Up, Third Realm, Hurricane Lane, John Leeper (Fairway Stakes), One Ruler (Autumn Stakes) and Youth Spirit (Chester Vase). Adayar was the least fancied of the three Appleby trainees, with Hurricane Lane and One Ruler being preferred in the betting market. Adam Kirby was offered the ride on the colt but had already accepted the mount on John Leeper, so Oisin Murphy was scheduled to ride Adayar. In a late change of jockey bookings Frankie Dettori replaced Kirby on John Leeper, while Kirby replaced Murphy on Adayar. After his customary poor start, Adayar settled close behind the leading group on the inside rail as Gear Up set a steady pace from Youth Spirit. He went to the front two furlongs from the finish and never looked in any danger of defeat thereafter, coming home 4 1/2 lengths clear of the 50/1 outsider Mojo Star, with a further three and a quarter lengths back to Hurricane Lane in third. After the race Appleby said "Adam has been a huge part of our operation since I started. He's helped out with the racing and he breaks a lot of horses for us. He broke all three Derby runners for us. When he became available I rang Oisin and when he picked up the phone he said 'I know what you're going to say.' He was very professional about it. He's a big horse. I wouldn't want to rush into anything with him yet so we'll sit back and have a nice discussion about where to go next in a while." Commenting on his decision to launch his challenge along the inside rail Kirby said "There was just enough room up the rail. I thought I needed to get in or get out. I knew I had to make a decision, so I went in. Luckily the horse was brave enough to go through the gap, and then he galloped up to the line. This will be a day I'll never forget."

For his next race, Adayar was matched against older horse for the 71st running of the King George VI and Queen Elizabeth Stakes over 1 1/2 miles at Ascot Racecourse on 23 July. Ridden by Buick, he started the 9/4 second favourite behind Love in a five-runner field which also included Mishriff, Lone Eagle (runner-up in the Irish Derby) and Broome (Grand Prix de Saint-Cloud). Adayar started quickly and pulled hard in the early stages before settling into second place behind Broome. He made a forward move on the final turn, overtook Broome approaching the last quarter mile and stayed on well, repelling the sustained challenge of Mishriff to win by one and three quarter lengths. After the race Buick said "He's a consummate professional. He has all the qualities of a top-class middle-distance horse. He has the required pace and the kick and the stamina, and a fantastic will to win. He had that kick at the top of the straight and then did what we saw at Epsom, that resolute gallop all the way to the line. We all thought he was a good Derby winner and he's confirmed that today." Adayar was the first horse to complete the Derby-King George double since his grandsire Galileo in 2001.

After a break of over two months Adayar was sent to France to contest the 100th edition of the Prix de l'Arc de Triomphe over 2400 metres on heavy ground at Longchamp Racecourse and started 3.6/1 second favourite behind Hurricane Lane. Buick sent the colt into the lead soon after the start and he opened up a clear advantage early in the straight. He was overtaken approaching the final 100 metres and faded in the final strides to come home fourth behind Torquator Tasso, Tarnawa and Hurricane Lane. Two weeks later the colt was dropped back in distance for the Champion Stakes over ten furlongs at Ascot. Starting the 5/2 second choice in the betting he was among the leaders from the start, went clear of his opponents three furlongs out but then tired badly and finished fifth of the nine runners behind Sealiway, beaten seven lengths by the winner.

== Pedigree ==
Pedigree of Adayar (IRE), bay colt, 2018
Sire Frankel (GB) 2008	Galileo (IRE); 1998	Sadler's Wells (USA)	Northern Dancer (CAN)
Sire Frankel (GB) 2008	Galileo (IRE); 1998	Sadler's Wells (USA)	Fairy Bridge
Sire Frankel (GB) 2008	Galileo (IRE); 1998	Urban Sea (USA)	Miswaki
Sire Frankel (GB) 2008	Galileo (IRE); 1998	Urban Sea (USA)	Allegretta (GB)
Sire Frankel (GB) 2008	Kind (IRE); 2001	Danehill (USA)	Danzig
Sire Frankel (GB) 2008	Kind (IRE); 2001	Danehill (USA)	Razyana
Sire Frankel (GB) 2008	Kind (IRE); 2001	Rainbow Lake (GB)	Rainbow Quest (USA)
Sire Frankel (GB) 2008	Kind (IRE); 2001	Rainbow Lake (GB)	Rockfest (USA)
Dam Anna Salai (USA) 2007	Dubawi (IRE); 2002	Dubai Millennium (GB)	Seeking The Gold (USA)
Dam Anna Salai (USA) 2007	Dubawi (IRE); 2002	Dubai Millennium (GB)	Colorado Dancer (IRE)
Dam Anna Salai (USA) 2007	Dubawi (IRE); 2002	Zomaradah (GB)	Deploy
Dam Anna Salai (USA) 2007	Dubawi (IRE); 2002	Zomaradah (GB)	Jawaher (IRE)
Dam Anna Salai (USA) 2007	Anna Palariva (IRE); 1995	Caerleon (USA)	Nijinsky (CAN)
Dam Anna Salai (USA) 2007	Anna Palariva (IRE); 1995	Caerleon (USA)	Foreseer
Dam Anna Salai (USA) 2007	Anna Palariva (IRE); 1995	Anna of Saxony (GB)	Ela-Mana-Mou (IRE)
Dam Anna Salai (USA) 2007	Anna Palariva (IRE); 1995	Anna of Saxony (GB)	Anna Matrushka (Family: 7-f)
