= Charlie Appleby (racehorse trainer) =

British racehorse trainer (born 1975)

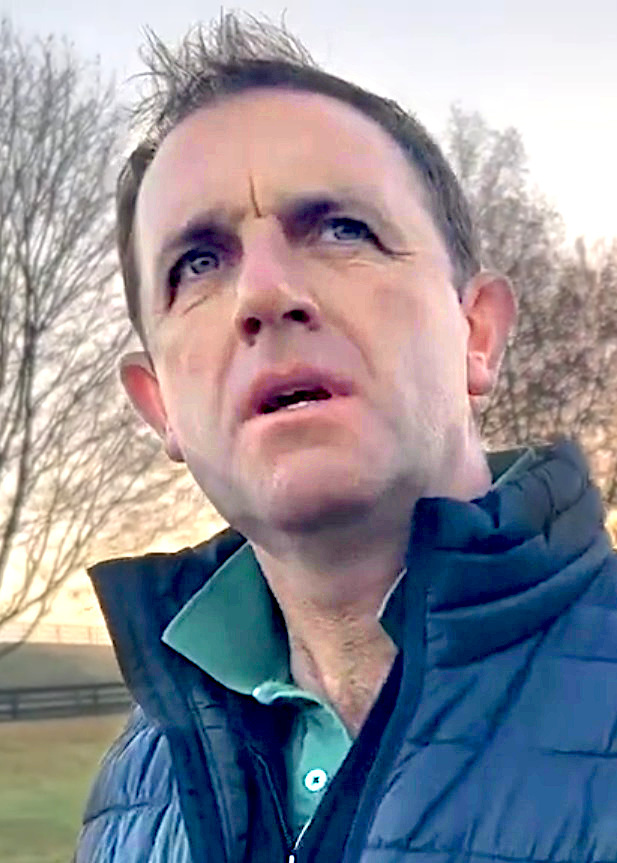
- Appleby in 2022

Personal information
- Born: 5 July 1975 (age 51) Southampton, Hampshire, England
- Occupation: Racehorse trainer

Horse racing career
- Sport: Horse racing

Major racing wins
- British Classic Races; The Derby (2018, 2021); St Leger Stakes (2021); 2000 Guineas (2022, 2024, 2025); 1000 Guineas (2025); Breeders' Cup Races; Breeders' Cup Filly & Mare Turf (2017); Breeders' Cup Juvenile Turf (2013), (2018), (2021); Breeders' Cup Juvenile Turf Sprint (2022); Breeders' Cup Mile (2021), (2022), (2023); Breeders' Cup Turf (2021), (2022)

Racing awards
- British flat racing Champion Trainer (2021, 2022)

Charlie Appleby (born 5 July 1975) is a British thoroughbred racehorse trainer who is employed by Godolphin. Based at Moulton Paddocks in Newmarket and Al Marmoon stables in Dubai, he has won multiple Group/Grade 1 races, including seven British Classic Races.

== Background and early career ==
Appleby grew up on a farm near Plymouth, where his parents kept ponies and bred Arabian horses. He attended a course at the British Racing School in Newmarket and rode in a few amateur flat races and point-to-point races but abandoned his hopes to become a jockey due to his height and weight. His first job in a Newmarket yard was for trainer Susan Piggott, and he would ride out with the trainer's husband, jockey Lester Piggott. When Susan Piggott retired, Appleby moved to the yard of David Loder In 1998, Loder became a private trainer for Godolphin, and Appleby spent two years working with him in France, and then, in 2002, obtained a post with Godolphin in Newmarket. He worked for Godolphin as travelling head lad and head lad before becoming assistant trainer to Saeed bin Suroor and Mahmood Al Zarooni. In 2013, he took over as trainer at Godolphin's Moulton Paddocks after Al Zarooni received an eight-year ban for administering anabolic steroids to 22 horses.

== Career as a trainer ==
Having obtained a trainer's licence from the British Horseracing Authority, Appleby sent out his first runners at the end of July 2013. His first success in a Group/Grade 1 race came in November 2013, when Outstrip won the Breeders' Cup Juvenile Turf at Santa Anita Park in California. While based at Moulton Paddocks during the British flat-racing season, he trains during the winter at Godolphin's Al Marmoon stables in Dubai. In November 2014, William Buick was appointed by Godolphin to ride as first stable jockey for Appleby.

Appleby gained his first success in a British Classic in June 2018, when Buick rode to victory in the Derby. It was also a first Derby win for Godolphin. In 2021, he was awarded the title of British flat racing Champion Trainer, with his horses earning nearly £5 million in total prize money. That year, he was also ranked first in Thoroughbred Racing Commentary's global trainer rankings. In 2022, he retained the British champion title, sending out 152 winners at a strike rate of 30%, earning over £6 million in prize money.

== Personal life ==
Appleby and his wife Aisling have four children.

== Major wins ==
(United Kingdom) Great Britain

- 1000 Guineas – (1) – Desert Flower (2025)
- 2000 Guineas – (3) – Coroebus (2022), Notable Speech (2024), Ruling Court (2025)
- British Champions Sprint Stakes – (1) – Creative Force (2021)
- City of York Stakes – (1) – Notable Speech (2026)
- Coronation Cup – (1) – Ghaiyyath (2020)
- Dewhurst Stakes – (3) – Pinatubo (2019), Native Trail (2021), Shadow of Light (2024)
- Platinum Jubilee Stakes / Diamond Jubilee Stakes – (2) – Blue Point (2019), Naval Crown (2022)
- Eclipse Stakes – (2) – Hawkbill (2016), Ghaiyyath (2020)
- The Derby – (2) – Masar (2018), Adayar (2021)
- Falmouth Stakes – (1) – Cinderella's Dream (2025)
- Fillies' Mile – (2) – Desert Flower (2024), Musical Times (2026)
- Futurity Trophy – (1) – Ancient Wisdom (2023)
- International Stakes – (1) – Ghaiyyath (2020)
- King's Stand Stakes – (2) – Blue Point (2018, 2019)
- Middle Park Stakes – (3) – Charming Thought (2014), Shadow of Light (2024), Wise Approach (2025)
- Nassau Stakes – (1) – Wild Illusion (2018)
- King George VI and Queen Elizabeth Stakes – (1) – Adayar (2021)
- Lockinge Stakes – (2) – Modern Games (2023), Notable Speech (2026)
- Queen Elizabeth II Stakes - (1) - Talk of New York (2026)
- St James's Palace Stakes – (1) – Coroebus (2022)
- St Leger Stakes – (1) – Hurricane Lane (2021)
- Sussex Stakes – (1) – Notable Speech (2024)

France

- Grand Prix de Paris – (1) – Hurricane Lane (2021)
- Poule d'Essai des Poulains – (1) – Modern Games (2022)
- Prix de la Forêt – (1) – Space Blues (2021)
- Prix de l'Opéra – (1) – Wild Illusion (2018)
- Prix Jean Prat – (1) – Pinatubo (2020)
- Prix Marcel Boussac – (2) – Wuheida (2016), Wild Illusion (2017)
- Prix Maurice de Gheest – (1) – Space Blues (2020)
- Prix Saint-Alary – (1) – Sobetsu (2017)

Germany

- Grosser Preis von Baden – (2) – Ghaiyyath (2019), Barney Roy (2020)
- Bayerisches Zuchtrennen – (2) – Barney Roy (2020), Nations Pride (2023)
- Grosser Preis von Berlin – (2) – Rebel's Romance (2022, 2025)
- Preis von Europa – (2) – Rebel's Romance (2022, 2024)

(Republic of Ireland) Ireland

- Vincent O'Brien National Stakes – (3) – Quorto (2018), Pinatubo (2019), Native Trail (2021)
- Irish Derby – (1) – Hurricane Lane (2021)
- Irish 2,000 Guineas – (1) – Native Trail (2022)

United Arab Emirates

- Al Quoz Sprint – (2) – Jungle Cat (2018), Blue Point (2019)
- Dubai Sheema Classic – (3) – Hawkbill (2018), Old Persian (2019), Rebel's Romance (2024)
- Jebel Hatta - (5) Tryster (2016), Blair House (2018), Barney Roy (2020), Measured Time (2024), Opera Ballo (2026)

United States

- Breeders' Cup Filly & Mare Turf – (1) – Wuheida (2017)
- Breeders' Cup Juvenile Turf – (3) – Outstrip (2013), Line of Duty (2018), Modern Games (2021)
- Breeders' Cup Juvenile Turf Sprint – (1) – Mischief Magic (2022)
- Breeders' Cup Mile – (4) – Space Blues (2021), Modern Games (2022), Master of The Seas (2023), Notable Speech (2025)
- Breeders' Cup Turf – (3) – Yibir (2021), Rebel's Romance (2022, 2024)
- Diana Stakes – (1) – Althiqa (2021)
- Joe Hirsch Turf Classic Stakes – (1) – Rebel's Romance (2025)
- Just A Game Stakes – (1) – Althiqa (2021)
- Belmont Oaks – (1) – Cinderella's Dream (2024)
- Manhattan Stakes – (1) – Measured Time (2024)
- Saratoga Derby Invitational Stakes – (1) – Nations Pride (2022)

Australia

- Melbourne Cup – (1) – Cross Counter (2018)
- Sir Rupert Clarke Stakes – (1) – Jungle Cat (2018)
- Sydney Cup – (1) – Polarisation (2017)

Canada

- Canadian International Stakes – (2) – Walton Street (2021), Nations Pride (2023)
- Natalma Stakes – (2) – La Pelosa (2018), Wild Beauty (2021)
- Northern Dancer Turf Stakes – (1) – Old Persian (2019)
- Summer Stakes – (3)- Albahr (2021), Mysterious Night (2022), Al Hudaiba (2026)
- Woodbine Mile – (4) – Modern Games (2022), Master of the Seas (2023), Notable Speech (2025, 2026)

Hong Kong

- Hong Kong Champions & Chater Cup – (1) – Rebel's Romance (2024)
