= William Haggas =

British racehorse trainer

William Haggas (formerly Haggis)
Personal information
- Born: 23 August 1960 (age 66) Skipton, North Yorkshire
- Occupation: Trainer

Horse racing career
- Sport: Horse racing

Major racing wins
- British Classic Race wins: Epsom Oaks (2011); Epsom Derby (1996); Other British Champions Series wins: British Champions Fillies' and Mares' Stakes (2011)

Significant horses
- Shaamit, Dancing Rain, Mukhadram & Sea of Class, Baaeed

William Haggas (born 23 August 1960) is a British Thoroughbred racehorse trainer, based at Somerville Lodge stables in Newmarket, Suffolk. He is the son-in-law of the multiple champion jockey Lester Piggott.

He was educated at Harrow and played cricket at Lord's for Harrow against Eton in 1977, 1978 and 1979, captaining the side in the 1979 match. He started his working life in his father's textile factory, but quit after three months and headed to Newmarket. Before taking out a licence in his own right, he learnt his trade with John Winter and Mark Prescott. He trained his first winner in 1987. As of June 2013, he had trained two British Classic winners – Shaamit, winner of the 1996 Derby, and Dancing Rain, winner of the 2011 Oaks. The first of these came when he had just 40 horses in his stable. The second gave him the distinction of having two wins from his first two runners in the Epsom Classics. His third, Vow, came fourth in the 2012 Oaks. Largely thanks to the exploits of Dancing Rain, he finished joint 7th in the 2011 British Champions Series trainers' table.

In early 2013 he was appointed to the roster of Royal trainers. He trained his first winner for the Queen (Elizabeth II), when Purple Spectrum won a maiden race at Windsor on 12 May 2014.

Other top-level horses he has trained include Chorist, Aqlaam and King's Apostle. He has also trained winners of the German 2,000 Guineas and Topkapi Trophy.

With his wife, he was invited to ride in the King's procession at Royal Ascot 2023.

== Major wins ==
(United Kingdom) Great Britain

- Derby – (1) – Shaamit (1996)
- Epsom Oaks – (1) – Dancing Rain (2011)
- British Champions Sprint Stakes - (1) - Almeraq (2026)
- Cheveley Park Stakes – (1) – Rosdhu Queen (2012)
- International Stakes – (1) – Baaeed (2022)
- Lockinge Stakes – (1) – Baaeed (2022)
- Eclipse Stakes – (1) – Mukhadram (2014)
- Racing Post Trophy – (1) – Rivet (2016)
- Yorkshire Oaks – (1) – Sea of Class (2018)
- Haydock Sprint Cup - (2) - Montassib (2024), Almeraq (2026)
- Sussex Stakes – (1) – Baaeed (2022)
- Champion Stakes – (1) – Addeybb (2020)
- Queen Elizabeth II Stakes – (1)- Baaeed (2021)
- Queen Anne Stakes – (1) – Baaeed (2022)
- Queen Elizabeth II Jubilee Stakes – (1) – Almeraq (2026)

France

- Prix de Royallieu – (2) – Sea La Rosa (2022), Sea Silk Road (2023)
- Grand Prix de Saint-Cloud - (1) - Dubai Honour (2024)
- Prix Maurice de Gheest – (1) – King's Apostle (2009)
- Prix de la Forêt – (3) – One Master (2018, 2019, 2020)
- Prix du Moulin de Longchamp – (2) – Aqlaam (2009), Baaeed (2021)
- Grand Prix de Paris - (1) - Maltese Cross (2026)

(Republic of Ireland) Ireland

- Pretty Polly Stakes – (2) – Chorist (2004), Urban Fox (2018)
- Irish Champion Stakes - (1) - Economics (2024)
- Irish Oaks – (1) – Sea of Class (2018)
- Tattersalls Gold Cup – (1) – Alenquer (2022)

Germany

- Preis Der Diana – (1) – Dancing Rain (2011)

Italy

- Gran Criterium – (1) – Count Dubois (2000)

Australia

- Queen Elizabeth Stakes – (3) – Addeybb (2020, 2021), Dubai Honour (2023)
- Ranvet Stakes – (2) – Addeybb (2020), Dubai Honour (2023)
- Golden Eagle - (1) - Lake Forest (2024)
- Tancred Stakes - (1) - Dubai Honour (2025)
