= Hurricane Lane (horse) =

Irish-bred Thoroughbred racehorse

- Racing silks of Godolphin
- Sire: Frankel
- Grandsire: Galileo
- Dam: Gale Force
- Damsire: Shirocco
- Sex: Colt
- Foaled: 11 March 2018
- Country: Ireland
- Colour: Chestnut
- Breeder: Normandie Stud Ltd
- Owner: Godolphin
- Trainer: Charlie Appleby
- Record: 8: 6-0-2
- Earnings: £1,980,001

Major wins
- Dante Stakes (2021); Irish Derby (2021); Grand Prix de Paris (2021); St Leger Stakes (2021); Jockey Club Stakes (2023)

Hurricane Lane (foaled 11 March 2018) is an Irish-bred, British-trained Thoroughbred racehorse. After winning his only race as a two-year-old in 2020 he made steady improvement in the following year, winning the Dante Stakes and finishing third in the Epsom Derby before winning the Irish Derby, the Grand Prix de Paris and the St Leger Stakes.

== Background ==
Hurricane Lane is a chestnut colt with a narrow white stripe bred in Ireland by Normandie Stud. As a yearling in 2019 he was consigned to the Tattersalls October Yearling Sale and was bought for 200,000 guineas by Sheikh Mohammed's Godolphin organisation. He was sent into training with Charlie Appleby at Moulton Paddocks in Newmarket, Suffolk.

He was from the fifth crop of foals sired by Frankel, an undefeated racehorse whose other progeny have included Cracksman, Anapurna, Soul Stirring and Without Parole. Hurricane Lane's dam Gale Force showed good racing ability, winning two minor events in England and the Listed Prix Denisy in France. She was a half-sister to Seal of Approval and a female-line descendant of Hazy Idea, the dam of Hittite Glory, making her a close relative of Harzand, Never Bend and Hethersett.

== Racing career ==
=== 2020: two-year-old season ===
Hurricane Lane made his racecourse debut in a one-mile novice race (for horses with no more than two previous wins) at Newmarket Racecourse on heavy ground on 21 October when he started the 3/1 second favourite behind his stablemate Royal Touch. Ridden by Adam Kirby he tracked the leaders before going to the front approaching the final furlong and won "comfortably" by two lengths from Parachute.

=== 2021: three-year-old season ===
==== Spring ====
On his first six starts in 2021, Hurricane Lane was ridden by William Buick. The colt began his three-year-old campaign on 16 April at Newbury Racecourse when he started 11/4 second choice for a minor race over ten furlongs. He led for most of the way before being overtaken by the favourite Maximal a furlong out but rallied to regain the advantage and won by a length. Hurricane Lane was then stepped up in class for the Group 2 Dante Stakes (a major trial race for the Epsom Derby) over 10 1/2 furlongs at York Racecourse on 13 May when he started the 5/1 second favourite behind the highly regarded Beresford Stakes-winner High Definition. He raced in second place behind the outsider Roman Empire for most of the way and, after looking to be outpaced early in the straight, he stayed on strongly to take the lead inside the final furlong and won by three-quarters of a length from Megallen with High Definition in third. After the race Buick said, "Everything he does, he does it right, he went through the gears nicely and when he got company he battled back... He's gone from strength to strength, he's improved with every run and has taken every run well, he's got a really good mind. I can't see much more you could ask of him."

==== Summer ====
On 5 June Hurricane Lane was one of eleven colts to contest the 242nd running of the Derby over 1 1/2 miles at Epsom Racecourse and started 6/1 second favourite behind the Coolmore Stud representative Bolshoi Ballet. He settled just behind the leaders before moving into second place in the straight but was unable to make further progress and came home third behind his stablemate Adayar and the 50/1 outsider Mojo Star. After the event, it was reported that he had lost both of his front shoes in the race. Three weeks after his run at Epsom Hurricane Lane was sent to Ireland for the Irish Derby at the Curragh and started 4/1 second favourite behind High Definition in an eleven-runner field which also included Mojo Star, Mac Swiney, Van Gogh and Lone Eagle (Zetland Stakes). After racing in mid-division he moved up into second place in the straight and stayed on strongly to run down the leader Lone Eagle in the final strides and win by a neck, with a gap of seven lengths back to Wordsworth in third. Buick commented "This horse has done nothing but improve, and he improved since Epsom. We all know that's not an easy thing to do... My horse quickened up really well and showed a lot of quality out there today. Once I switched him out wide, he managed to get some clear running room and he took off. He's a very, very good horse. We obviously fancied him at Epsom and today he's improved again. This horse is a slow learner, a bit like myself, but we'll get there in the end!"

On 14 July at Longchamp Racecourse Hurricane Lane started the 1.7/1 favourite for the Grand Prix de Paris over 2400 metres. His ten opponents included Alenquer (King Edward VII Stakes), Cheshire Academy (Prix Noailles), Saiydabad (Prix de Suresnes), Northern Ruler (Prix du Lys), Baby Rider (Prix Greffulhe) and Bubble Gift (Prix Hocquart). He raced in second place behind The Mediterranean and after taking the lead 200 metres from the finish he "powered clear" to win "comfortably" by six lengths. William Buick said "It was a more straightforward race for me than in Ireland. We were better placed today and the ground was maybe a little bit kinder on him. But I think he's improved again... He keeps getting quicker. In Ireland he showed a bit of a turn of foot. And then today... He really picked up. He put it to bed really quick. He's improved again and he's just a very good horse."

==== Autumn ====
The 245th running of the St Leger was run over 14 1/2 furlongs at Doncaster Racecourse on 11 September and Hurricane Lane started the 8/11 third favourite in a ten-runner field which also included Mojo Star, High Definition, Scope, Ottoman Emperor (Gordon Stakes), Interpretation (Vinnie Roe Stakes) and The Mediterranean. After settling in mid-division he took the lead from Mojo Star entering the last quarter mile and won "comfortably" by two and three quarter lengths. Charlie Appleby commented "It's unusual in these Group 1s and Classics to be able to enjoy watching a race, but it was one of those races when I was always comfortable... For a horse who stays a mile and six he's got a gear change and that's what makes him stand out from the rest at the moment... What I love about Hurricane Lane is in the paddock he walks around like an old boxer, as cool as you like. He knows when it's time to bring his A-game on."

Three weeks after his win at Doncaster, Hurricane Lane was sent to France to contest the 100th edition of the Prix de l'Arc de Triomphe over 2400 metres on heavy ground at Longchamp when he was partnered by James Doyle and started the 3/1 favourite. He raced in mid-division before overcoming an obstructed run to take the lead 120 metres from the finish but was overtaken in the final strides and came home third, beaten three quarters of a length and a short head by Torquator Tasso and Tarnawa.

== Pedigree ==
Pedigree of Hurricane Lane (IRE), chestnut colt, 2018
Sire Frankel (GB) 2008	Galileo (IRE); 1998	Sadler's Wells (USA)	Northern Dancer (CAN)
Sire Frankel (GB) 2008	Galileo (IRE); 1998	Sadler's Wells (USA)	Fairy Bridge
Sire Frankel (GB) 2008	Galileo (IRE); 1998	Urban Sea (USA)	Miswaki
Sire Frankel (GB) 2008	Galileo (IRE); 1998	Urban Sea (USA)	Allegretta (GB)
Sire Frankel (GB) 2008	Kind (IRE); 2001	Danehill (USA)	Danzig
Sire Frankel (GB) 2008	Kind (IRE); 2001	Danehill (USA)	Razyana
Sire Frankel (GB) 2008	Kind (IRE); 2001	Rainbow Lake (GB)	Rainbow Quest (USA)
Sire Frankel (GB) 2008	Kind (IRE); 2001	Rainbow Lake (GB)	Rockfest (USA)
Dam Gale Force (GB) 2011	Shirocco (GER); 2001	Monsun	Königsstuhl
Dam Gale Force (GB) 2011	Shirocco (GER); 2001	Monsun	Mosella
Dam Gale Force (GB) 2011	Shirocco (GER); 2001	So Sedulous (USA)	The Minstrel (CAN)
Dam Gale Force (GB) 2011	Shirocco (GER); 2001	So Sedulous (USA)	Sedulous (IRE)
Dam Gale Force (GB) 2011	Hannda (IRE); 2002	Dr Devious	Ahonoora (GB)
Dam Gale Force (GB) 2011	Hannda (IRE); 2002	Dr Devious	Rose of Jericho (USA)
Dam Gale Force (GB) 2011	Hannda (IRE); 2002	Handaza	Be My Guest (USA)
Dam Gale Force (GB) 2011	Hannda (IRE); 2002	Handaza	Hazaradjat (Family: 21-a)
