= Mother Earth (horse) =

Irish Thoroughbred racehorse

- Racing silks of Mr Derrick Smith
- Sire: Zoffany
- Grandsire: Dansili
- Dam: Many Colours
- Damsire: Green Desert
- Sex: Filly
- Foaled: 24 April 2018
- Country: Ireland
- Colour: Bay
- Breeder: Grenane House Stud
- Owner: Derrick Smith & Mrs John Magnier & Michael Tabor
- Trainer: Aidan O'Brien
- Record: 19: 4-5-6
- Earnings: £1,080,579

Major wins
- Fillies' Sprint Stakes (2020); 1000 Guineas (2021); Prix Rothschild (2021); Park Express Stakes (2022)

Mother Earth (foaled 24 April 2018) is an Irish Thoroughbred racehorse. As a two-year-old in 2020 she ran eight times, winning the Fillies' Sprint Stakes and finishing placed in the Albany Stakes, Airlie Stud Stakes, Debutante Stakes, Fillies' Mile and the Breeders' Cup Juvenile Fillies Turf. On her first run of 2021 she won the 1000 Guineas.

== Background ==
Mother Earth is a bay filly with a white star bred in Ireland by the County Tipperary-based Grenane House Stud. She was consigned to the Goffs Orby Yearling Sale in October 2019 and was bought for €150,000 by Michael Magnier on behalf of the Coolmore Stud organisation. The filly was sent into training with Aidan O'Brien at Ballydoyle and raced in the colours of the Coolmore partners Derrick Smith, Susan Magnier and Michael Tabor.

She was from the sixth crop of foals sired by Zoffany, who won the Phoenix Stakes as a two-year-old but produced his best effort when running a close second to Frankel in the St James's Palace Stakes. His other foals have included Albigna, Thunder Moon, Ventura Storm (Gran Premio del Jockey Club), Washington DC (Windsor Castle Stakes) and Fleeting (May Hill Stakes). Mother Earth's dam Many Colours showed good racing ability, winning five races including the Listed Dance Design Stakes. As a female-line descendant of the Irish broodmare Fair Astronomer, she was related to several major winners including Deputy Commander, Malhub, Roger Barows, Donna Blini and Gentildonna.

== Racing career ==
=== 2020: two-year-old season ===
Mother Earth began her racing career in a maiden race over five and a half furlongs at Navan Racecourse on 10 June when she started at odds of 4/1 in a fourteen-runner field. Ridden by Wayne Lordan she kept on well in the closing stages to finish second, beaten one and a half lengths by the winner Frenetic. Nine days later she was sent to England and stepped up to Group 3 class for the Albany Stakes at Royal Ascot when she was ridden by Ryan Moore and finished third behind Dandalla and Setarhe after being repeatedly hampered as she attempted to obtain a clear run. At Naas Racecourse on 4 July Mother Earth went off the 10/11 favourite for the Group 3 Fillies' Sprint Stakes over six furlongs on soft ground. With Lordan in the saddle she disputed the lead from the start, went clear of her opponents in the final furlong and won by four lengths from the Jessica Harrington-trained Sussex Garden. After the race Lordan commented: "She's a smashing filly and her form was good enough to win. I travelled easy and she's a filly that's going to stay further, so I was happy to go forward. When I got there she probably thought she'd done enough. She's a smart filly."

On 19 July at the Curragh Mother Earth was stepped up to Group 2 class for the Airlie Stud Stakes and finished third of the four runners behind Aloha Star and Frenetic. At the same track on 22 August she came home third behind Pretty Gorgeous and Shale in the Debutante Stakes over seven furlongs. On 13 September the filly was moved up to Group 1 class for the Moyglare Stud Stakes at the Curragh. She led for most of the way before tiring in the last quarter mile and coming home eleventh of the thirteen runners behind Shale. On 9 October Mother Earth was sent to England and moved up in distance for the Fillies' Mile at Newmarket Racecourse. Starting at odds of 18/1 she was restrained towards the rear of the field before making steady progress to take third place behind Pretty Gorgeous and Indigo Girl. She was initially reported to have finished in eighth place, while her stablemate Snowfall had finished third, but in a bizarre postscript to the race it was revealed that the two Aidan O'Brien runners had carried the wrong number cloths and been ridden by the wrong jockeys, meaning that the filly who finished third was actually Mother Earth. For her final run of the year the filly was sent to the United States to contest the Breeders' Cup Juvenile Fillies Turf over one mile at Keeneland on 6 November. Ridden by Ryan Moore she was restrained towards the rear of the field before "staying on strongly" to take second place behind Aunt Pearl.

In the official European classification of for 2020 Mother Earth was given a rating of 111, making her the sixth best two-year-old filly of the season.

=== 2021: three-year-old season ===
On 2 May Mother Earth started at odds of 10/1 in an eleven-runner field for the 208th running of the 1000 Guineas over the Rowley Mile at Newmarket. With Ryan Moore opting to ride the O'Brien stable's more fancied runner Santa Barbara, Mother Earth was partnered by the veteran Frankie Dettori. The other contenders included Alcohol Free, Sacred (winner of the Nell Gwyn Stakes), Saffron Beach (Oh So Sharp Stakes), Fev Rover (Prix du Calvados) and Star of Emaraaty (Sweet Solera Stakes). After being restrained by Dettori in the early stages as Statement and Fev Rover disputed the early lead Mother Earth moved up on the far side to take the lead just inside the last quarter mile and "kept on well" to win by a length from Saffron Beach. After the race Dettori said "I'm super-excited to win that. I didn’t have the pressure of riding the favourite and I had a very willing partner with a filly that I knew was going to give me everything. Aidan gave me a lot of confidence this morning. He said: ‘Forget about Santa Barbara, just ride your own race.’ I forgot about Santa Barbara, kicked at the top of the hill, I knew she'd stay really well and she did and I won, it's as simple as that." Two weeks after her win in the 1000 Guineas Mother Earth started 1.7/1 favourite for the French equivalent, the Poule d'Essai des Pouliches over 1600 metres at Longchamp Racecourse. After settling in sixth place she moved up to briefly take the lead 150 metres from the finish but was overtaken and beaten into second place by the 38/1 outsider Coeursamba.

== Pedigree ==
Pedigree of Mother Earth (IRE), bay fillly 2018
| Sire Zoffany (IRE) 2008 | Dansili (GB); 1996 | Danehill (USA) | Danzig |
| Sire Zoffany (IRE) 2008 | Dansili (GB); 1996 | Danehill (USA) | Razyana |
| Sire Zoffany (IRE) 2008 | Dansili (GB); 1996 | Hasili (IRE) | Kahyasi |
| Sire Zoffany (IRE) 2008 | Dansili (GB); 1996 | Hasili (IRE) | Kerali (GB) |
| Sire Zoffany (IRE) 2008 | Tyranny (GB); 2000 | Machiavellian (USA) | Mr. Prospector |
| Sire Zoffany (IRE) 2008 | Tyranny (GB); 2000 | Machiavellian (USA) | Coup de Folie |
| Sire Zoffany (IRE) 2008 | Tyranny (GB); 2000 | Dust Dancer | Suave Dancer (USA) |
| Sire Zoffany (IRE) 2008 | Tyranny (GB); 2000 | Dust Dancer | Galaxie Dust (USA) |
| Dam Many Colours (GB) 2004 | Green Desert (USA); 1983 | Danzig | Northern Dancer (CAN) |
| Dam Many Colours (GB) 2004 | Green Desert (USA); 1983 | Danzig | Pas de Nom |
| Dam Many Colours (GB) 2004 | Green Desert (USA); 1983 | Foreign Courier | Sir Ivor |
| Dam Many Colours (GB) 2004 | Green Desert (USA); 1983 | Foreign Courier | Courtly Dee |
| Dam Many Colours (GB) 2004 | First of Many (GB); 1999 | Darshaan | Shirley Heights |
| Dam Many Colours (GB) 2004 | First of Many (GB); 1999 | Darshaan | Delsy (FR) |
| Dam Many Colours (GB) 2004 | First of Many (GB); 1999 | Star Profile (IRE) | Sadler's Wells (USA) |
| Dam Many Colours (GB) 2004 | First of Many (GB); 1999 | Star Profile (IRE) | Sandhurst Goddess (Family: 16-f) |

- Mother Earth was inbred 3 × 4 to Danzig, meaning that this stallion appears in both the third and fourth generations of her pedigree.
