= 2022 Epsom Derby =

243rd running of the Epsom Derby horse race

- Epsom Derby
- Location: Epsom Downs Racecourse
- Date: 4 June 2022
- Winning horse: Desert Crown
- Starting price: 5/2F
- Jockey: Richard Kingscote
- Trainer: Michael Stoute
- Owner: Saeed Suhail
- Conditions: Good

Epsom Derby 2022
1-2-3
Desert Crown	Hoo Ya Mal	Westover

Also Ran
4-5-6
Masekela	Changingoftheguard	Stone Age
7-8-9
Nahanni	Nations Pride	West Wind Blows
10-11-12
El Habeeb	Grand Alliance	Piz Badile
13-14-15
Star Of India	Glory Daze	Sonny Liston
16-17
Royal Patronage	Walk Of Stars	17 Ran

The 2022 Epsom Derby was the 243rd annual running of the Derby horse race which took place at Epsom Downs Racecourse on 4 June 2022. The race was sponsored for the second time by the online car-dealer Cazoo.

Due to COVID-19 pandemic, the first entries were closed in February 2022.

The race was won by Desert Crown, owned by Suaeed Suhail, trained by Sir Michael Stoute and ridden by Richard Kingscote. It was Stoute's sixth win in the race and at 78 he became the oldest-known Derby-winning trainer. Kingscote was winning the Derby for the first time, in his second ride in the race.

== Full result ==
Reference - Racing Post result

	Dist *	Horse	Jockey	Trainer	SP
1		Desert Crown	Richard Kingscote	Michael Stoute	5/2 fav
2	2½	Hoo Ya Mal	David Probert	Andrew Balding	150/1
3	hd	Westover	Rob Hornby	Ralph Beckett	25/1
4	5½	Masekela	Andrea Atzeni	Andrew Balding	66/1
5	1	Changingoftheguard	Wayne Lordan	Aidan O'Brien (IRE)	9/1
6	1¾	Stone Age	Ryan Moore	Aidan O'Brien (IRE)	7/2
7	¾	Nahanni	Adam Kirby	Charlie Appleby	25/1
8	1¾	Nations Pride	William Buick	Charlie Appleby	15/2
9	1¼	West Wind Blows	Jack Mitchell	Simon & Ed Crisford	40/1
10	shd	El Habeeb	John Egan	Stan Moore	250/1
11	1¼	Grand Alliance	Daniel Tudhope	Charlie Fellowes	40/1
12	½	Piz Badile	Frankie Dettori	Donnacha O'Brien (IRE)	9/1
13	1½	Star of India	Seamie Heffernan	Aidan O'Brien (IRE)	16/1
14	6	Glory Daze	Ronan Whelan	Andy Oliver (IRE)	66/1
15	nk	Sonny Liston	Tom Marquand	Charlie Hills	100/1
16	13	Royal Patronage	Jason Hart	Charlie & Mark Johnston	28/1
17	34	Walk of Stars	James Doyle	Charlie Appleby	11/1

Winning time: 2 min 36.38 sec

* The distances between the horses are shown in lengths or shorter; shd = short head; hd = head; nk = neck.
† Trainers are based in Great Britain unless indicated.

== Form analysis ==
=== Two-year-old races ===
Notable runs by the future Derby participants as two-year-olds in 2021

- Hoo Ya Mal - 2nd in Flying Scotsman Stakes
- Masekela - 1st in Denford Stakes, 2nd in Superlative Stakes
- Piz Badile - 2nd in Eyrefield Stakes
- Royal Patronage - 1st in Acomb Stakes, 1st in Royal Lodge Stakes
- Stone Age - 2nd in Criterium de Saint-Cloud, 2nd in Juvenile Stakes
- Westover - 2nd in Silver Tankard Stakes

=== Road to Epsom ===
Early-season appearances in 2022 and trial races prior to running in the Derby:

- Changingoftheguard - 1st in Chester Vase
- Desert Crown - 1st in Dante Stakes
- Glory Daze - 2nd in Leopardstown Derby Trial
- Grand Alliance - 2nd in Blue Riband Trial Stakes
- Hoo Ya Mal - 2nd in Newmarket Stakes, 3rd in Craven Stakes
- Masekela - 2nd in Feilden Stakes
- Nahanni - 1st in Blue Riband Trial Stakes
- Nations Pride - 1st in Newmarket Stakes
- Piz Badile - 1st in Ballysax Stakes
- Sonny Liston - 3rd in Dee Stakes
- Star of India - 1st in Dee Stakes
- Stone Age - 1st in Leopardstown Derby Trial
- Westover - 1st in Sandown Classic Trial

=== Subsequent Group 1 wins ===
Group 1 / Grade I victories after running in the Derby:

- Nations Pride – Saratoga Derby (2022), Bayerisches Zuchtrennen (2023), Canadian International Stakes (2023)
- Westover – Irish Derby (2022), Grand Prix de Saint-Cloud (2023)
