= Edmund Beckett =

Edmund Beckett may refer to:

- Edmund Beckett, 1st Baron Grimthorpe (1816–1905), lawyer
- Sir Edmund Beckett, 4th Baronet (1787–1874), Conservative MP

== See also ==
- Edmund Beckett Denison (disambiguation)
