= Westover (horse) =

British Thoroughbred racehorse

- Sire: Frankel
- Grandsire: Galileo
- Dam: Mirabilis
- Damsire: Lear Fan
- Sex: Colt
- Foaled: 24 April 2019
- Country: United Kingdom
- Colour: Bay
- Breeder: Juddmonte Farm
- Owner: Juddmonte
- Trainer: Ralph Beckett
- Record: 13: 4-6-1
- Earnings: £3,324,971

Major wins
- Sandown Classic Trial (2022); Irish Derby (2022); Grand Prix de Saint-Cloud (2023); Timeform rating: 132
- Last updated on 1 August 2023

Westover (foaled 24 April 2019) is a retired British Thoroughbred racehorse. He showed promise as a two-year-old in 2021 when he won on his debut and then finished second in both the Haynes, Hanson and Clark Conditions Stakes and the Silver Tankard Stakes. In the following year he won the Sandown Classic Trial and ran third in the Epsom Derby before taking the Irish Derby by seven lengths. As a four-year-old he won the Grand Prix de Saint-Cloud before sustaining a career-ending injury when he came second in the Prix de l'Arc de Triomphe.

== Background ==
Westover is a bay colt with a small white star and two white coronets bred in England, by his owner Khalid Abdullah's Juddmonte Farms. Khalid Abdullah died before Westover began his racing career and the horse raced in the ownership of Juddmonte. He was sent into training with Ralph Beckett at Kimpton, Hampshire.

He was from the sixth crop of foals sired by Frankel, an undefeated racehorse whose other progeny have included Cracksman, Adayar, Soul Stirring and Hurricane Lane. Westover's dam Mirabilis showed good racing ability, winning five races including the Listed Prix d'Angerville in France and the Grade III Churchill Distaff Turf Mile Stakes in the United States. She was a half sister to the outstanding racemare Nebraska Tornado.

== Racing career ==
=== 2021: two-year-old season ===
Westover began his racing career in a maiden race over one mile on good to soft ground at Sandown Park Racecourse on 5 August when he was ridden by Rob Hornby and started the 2/1 second favourite in a six-runner field. After tracking the leaders he went to the front inside the final furlong and won "going away" by one and a quarter lengths from Bullet Force. On 17 September he was stepped up in class for the Haynes, Hanson and Clark Conditions Stakes over the same distance at Newbury Racecourse and finished second to the front-running Zechariah. Ryan Moore took over from Hornby when Westover started the 8/11 favourite for the Listed Silver Tankard Stakes at Pontefract Racecourse in October. He raced in mid-division before making steady progress in the last quarter mile but failed to overhaul the gelding Mr Professor and was beaten a neck into second place.

=== 2022: three-year-old season ===
On his first appearance as a three-year-old Westover contested the Group 3 bet365 Classic Trial over ten furlongs at Sandown on 22 April when he was ridden by Hornby and went off the 5/1 third choice in the betting behind Goldspur (winner of the Zetland Stakes) and the Aidan O'Brien-trained River Thames. He was among the leaders from the start, gained the advantage from Goldspur inside the final furlong and held off a strong late challenge from Cash to win by a short head. After the race Hornby said "He's a beast, a serious unit, and we always thought he'd be better at three. He was still quite keen early on and it was just a matter of settling him, but he really picked up when he saw space... For a big horse, he's pretty well balanced and is quite light on his feet."

On 4 June Westover started a 25/1 outsider for the 243rd running of the Derby over one and a half miles at Epsom Racecourse. He raced on the inside in mid-division before beginning to make progress in the straight but was repeatedly obstructed and denied a clear run. He was switched to the outside a furlong out and finished strongly to come home third of the seventeen runners behind Desert Crown and Hoo Ya Mal, beaten two and three quarter lengths by the winner.

Three weeks after his defeat at Epsom, Westover was sent to Ireland to contest the Irish Derby at the Curragh and started the 11/8 joint favourite alongside the Epsom Oaks winner Tuesday in an eight runner field which also included Hannibal Barca (Gallinule Stakes), Lionel (Cocked Hat Stakes) and Piz Badile (Ballysax Stakes). Colin Keane replaced Hornby as Westover's jockey, with Juddmonte's general manager Barry Mahon explaining "we felt that having a three-time Irish champion jockey who's ridden Classic winners at the Curragh and rides there on a weekly basis would be a benefit to the horse". Westover raced in second place behind French Claim before taking the lead entering the straight and drew away from his opponents in the last quarter mile to win in "impressive" style by seven lengths from Piz Badile. Ralph Beckett commented "Colin was positive on him from the outset and took the bull by the horns... I really didn’t think he would win like that at this stage. He’s a big horse and still a work in progress. He’s going to get better with age. I never felt he was going to stop when he got into his stride. He has a great temperament and that shone through today."

=== 2023: four-year-old season ===
First time out as a four-year-old, Westover was sent to Dubai for the Dubai Sheema Classic at Meydan, where he was ridden by Moore and finished second behind the Japanese horse Equinox. His next race was on 2 June, when he started 5/2 favourite in a field of five for the Coronation Cup at Epsom. Ridden by Hornby (who would ride him in his remaining races), he was beaten one and three quarter lengths into second place by the filly Emily Upjohn, with a gap of seven and a half lengths back to Point Lonsdale in third place. In early July Westover made the trip to France to contest the Grand Prix de Saint-Cloud. Odds-on favourite, he won by two lengths and set a new race record. Three weeks later, he was second in the King George VI and Queen Elizabeth Stakes at Ascot, beaten a head by Hukum. On 1 October, he was beaten one and three quarter lengths by favourite Ace Impact in the Prix de l'Arc de Triomphe at Longchamp Racecourse in Paris. Two days later he developed a swelling which proved to be a career-ending issue and on 4 October it was announced that he would be retired to stud.

On 17 November 2023, Westover arrived at the Yushun Stallion Station in Niikappu, Hokkaido, Japan.

== Pedigree ==
Pedigree of Westover (GB), bay colt, 2019
Sire Frankel (GB) 2008	Galileo (IRE); 1998	Sadler's Wells (USA)	Northern Dancer (CAN)
Sire Frankel (GB) 2008	Galileo (IRE); 1998	Sadler's Wells (USA)	Fairy Bridge
Sire Frankel (GB) 2008	Galileo (IRE); 1998	Urban Sea (USA)	Miswaki
Sire Frankel (GB) 2008	Galileo (IRE); 1998	Urban Sea (USA)	Allegretta (GB)
Sire Frankel (GB) 2008	Kind (IRE); 2001	Danehill (USA)	Danzig
Sire Frankel (GB) 2008	Kind (IRE); 2001	Danehill (USA)	Razyana
Sire Frankel (GB) 2008	Kind (IRE); 2001	Rainbow Lake (GB)	Rainbow Quest (USA)
Sire Frankel (GB) 2008	Kind (IRE); 2001	Rainbow Lake (GB)	Rockfest (USA)
Dam Mirabilis (USA) 2002	Lear Fan (USA); 1981	Roberto	Hail To Reason
Dam Mirabilis (USA) 2002	Lear Fan (USA); 1981	Roberto	Bramalea
Dam Mirabilis (USA) 2002	Lear Fan (USA); 1981	Wac	Lt. Stevens
Dam Mirabilis (USA) 2002	Lear Fan (USA); 1981	Wac	Belthazar
Dam Mirabilis (USA) 2002	Media Nox (GB); 1993	Lycius (USA)	Mr Prospector
Dam Mirabilis (USA) 2002	Media Nox (GB); 1993	Lycius (USA)	Lypatia (FR)
Dam Mirabilis (USA) 2002	Media Nox (GB); 1993	Sky Love (USA)	Nijinsky (CAN)
Dam Mirabilis (USA) 2002	Media Nox (GB); 1993	Sky Love (USA)	Gangster of Love (Family: 23-b)
