= Grimthorpe Handicap Chase =

Steeplechase horse race in Britain

Grimthorpe Chase
2026
Jasmin De Grugy	Some Scope	New Order

Previous years
2025
Moroder	The Kniphand	Hymac
2024
Does He Know	Some Scope	Only two finished
2023
Moroder	Undersupervision	Windsor Avenue
2022
Undersupervision	Mister Malarky	Cloth Cap
2021
Red Infantry	Special Prep	Canelo

2020-2011
2020
Captain Chaos	Worthy Farm	Yalltari
2019
Chidswell	Dingo Dollar	Brian Boranha
2017
Definitly Red	The Last Samuri	Wakanda
2016
The Last Samuri	The Druids Nephew	Band of Blood
2015
Wayward Prince	Drop Out Joe	Night in Milan
2014
Night in Milan	Storm Survivor	Renard
2013
Quentin Collonges	Mr Moss	Beneficial Reform
2012
Ikorodu Road	Junior	Benny Be Good
2011
Always Right	Lothian Falcon	Character Building

2010-2001
2010
Wogan	Killyglen	Coe
2009
Out The Black	Gidam Gidam	Idle Talk
2008
Cloudy Lane	Ungaro	Alderburn
2005
Run For Paddy	Lou Du Moulin Mas	Little Big Horse
2004
Grey Abbey	Royal Auclair	Mercato
2003
Tom's Prize	Kildorragh	Fatehalkhair
2002
Skillwise	Samuel Wilderspin	Grey Abbey

2000-1991
2000
Knight Templar	Merry Path	Lord of The West
1998
The Toiseach	Random Harvest	Scotton Banks
1997
Father Sky	Change The Reign	Whispering Steel
1995
Meleagris	Nevada Gold	Channels Gate
1994
Shraden Leader	Whaat Fettle	High Padre
1993
Damers Cavalry	Kilhallon Castle	Ardcroney Chief
1992
Damers Cavalry	Azusa	Golden Fox
1991
Mirage Day	Ace Of Spies	Only two finished

1990-1988
1990
Damers Cavalry	The Langholm Dyer	Glenside Jerry
1989
Shepherd's Hymn	Woodside Road	Tarconey
1988
Deep South	Sam Wrekin	West Tip

The Grimthorpe Handicap Chase is a National Hunt handicap steeplechase in England which is open to horses aged five years or older. It is run at Doncaster over a distance of about 3 miles and 2 furlongs (3 miles, 2 furlongs and 1 yard or 5,231 metres) and during the race there are 19 fences to be jumped. The race is scheduled to take place each year in late February or early March.

Prior to the early 1980s the Grimthorpe Chase was run over two miles and 150 yards. The distance was then nearly doubled to a stamina testing four miles and 100 yards.

The distance was changed again to the current trip in the 1990s, when it was run as the Velka Pardubicka Grimthorpe Chase, a reference to Velká pardubická, a famous race run in the Czech Republic over varied obstacles. The race is now considered to be a trial for the Grand National.

The race is named in honour of the Grimthorpe family who have been involved in racing for many years. Ralph Beckett, 3rd Baron Grimthorpe owned Fragrant Mac (winner 1952 Scottish Grand National) and Fortina (winner 1947 Cheltenham Gold Cup). Christopher Beckett, the fourth Baron, was a member of the Jockey Club and director of Thirsk Racecourse, and the current Baron Grimthorpe, Teddy Beckett, has been chairman of York Racecourse and racing manager to Khalid Abdullah.

== Winners since 1985 ==
Year	Winner	Age	Weight	Jockey	Trainer
1985	Immigrate	12	10-02	Neale Doughty	Gordon W Richards
1986	Abandoned due to frost
1987	Hardy Lad	10	11-00	Micky Hammond	Jumbo Wilkinson
1988	Deep South	9	11-08	Mark Dwyer	Jimmy FitzGerald
1989	Shepherd's Hymn	8	11-02	Reg Crank	Paul Blockley
1990	Damers Cavalry	7	11-00	Bruce Dowling	Richard Lee
1991	Mirage Day	8	11-02	Norman Williamson	John Edwards
1992	Damers Cavalry	9	10-03	P McLoughlin (Note: amateur jockey)	Richard Lee
1993	Damers Cavalry	10	11-07	Rodi Greene	Richard Lee
1994	Shraden Leader	9	10-06	Norman Williamson	Kim Bailey
1995	Meleagris	11	10-11	Adrian Maguire	David Nicholson
1996	No race
1997	Father Sky	6	10–11	Jamie Osborne	Oliver Sherwood
1998	The Toiseach	7	10-08	Tony Dobbin	James Fanshawe
1999	Abandoned due to snow
2000	Knight Templar	7	10-00	Barry Fenton	Paul Nicholls
2001	Abandoned due to Foot and Mouth outbreak
2002	Skillwise	10	10-00	David O'Meara	Tim Easterby
2003	Tom's Prize	8	10–11	Marcus Foley	John Spearing
2004	Grey Abbey	10	11–12	Alan Dempsey	J Howard Johnson
2005	Run For Paddy	9	10-05	Noel Fehily	Mark Pitman
2006	No race: Course closed for redevelopment
2007	No race: Course closed for redevelopment
2008	Cloudy Lane	8	11-09	Jason Maguire	Donald McCain
2009	Out The Black	11	10-00	Tom O'Brien	Philip Hobbs
2010	Wogan	10	10-02	Andrew Tinkler	Nicky Henderson
2011	Always Right	9	10-10	James Reveley	John Wade
2012	Ikorodu Road	9	10-00	Charlie Poste	Matt Sheppard
2013	Quentin Collonges	9	10-00	Andrew Tinkler	Henry Daly
2014	Night in Milan	8	10–12	James Reveley	Keith Reveley
2015	Wayward Prince	11	10-04	Robert Dunne	Hilary Parrott
2016	The Last Samuri	8	11–12	David Bass	Kim Bailey
2017	Definitly Red	8	11–00	Danny Cook	Brian Ellison
2018	Abandoned due to snow
2019	Chidswell	10	10-04	Craig Nichol	Nicky Richards
2020	Captain Chaos	9	10-13	Harry Skelton	Dan Skelton
2021	Red Infantry	11	09-11	Charlie Todd	Ian Williams
2022	Undersupervision	6	10-11	Sam Twiston-Davies	Nigel Twiston-Davies
2023	Moroder	9	10-02	James Best	Seamus Mullins
2024	Does He Know	9	12-00	David Bass	Kim Bailey
2025	Moroder	11	10-07	James Best	Seamus Mullins
2026	Jasmin De Grugy	7	11-03	Richie McLernon	Anthony Honeyball

== See also ==
- Horse racing in Great Britain
- List of British National Hunt races
