= Ernest Beckett, 2nd Baron Grimthorpe =

British politician

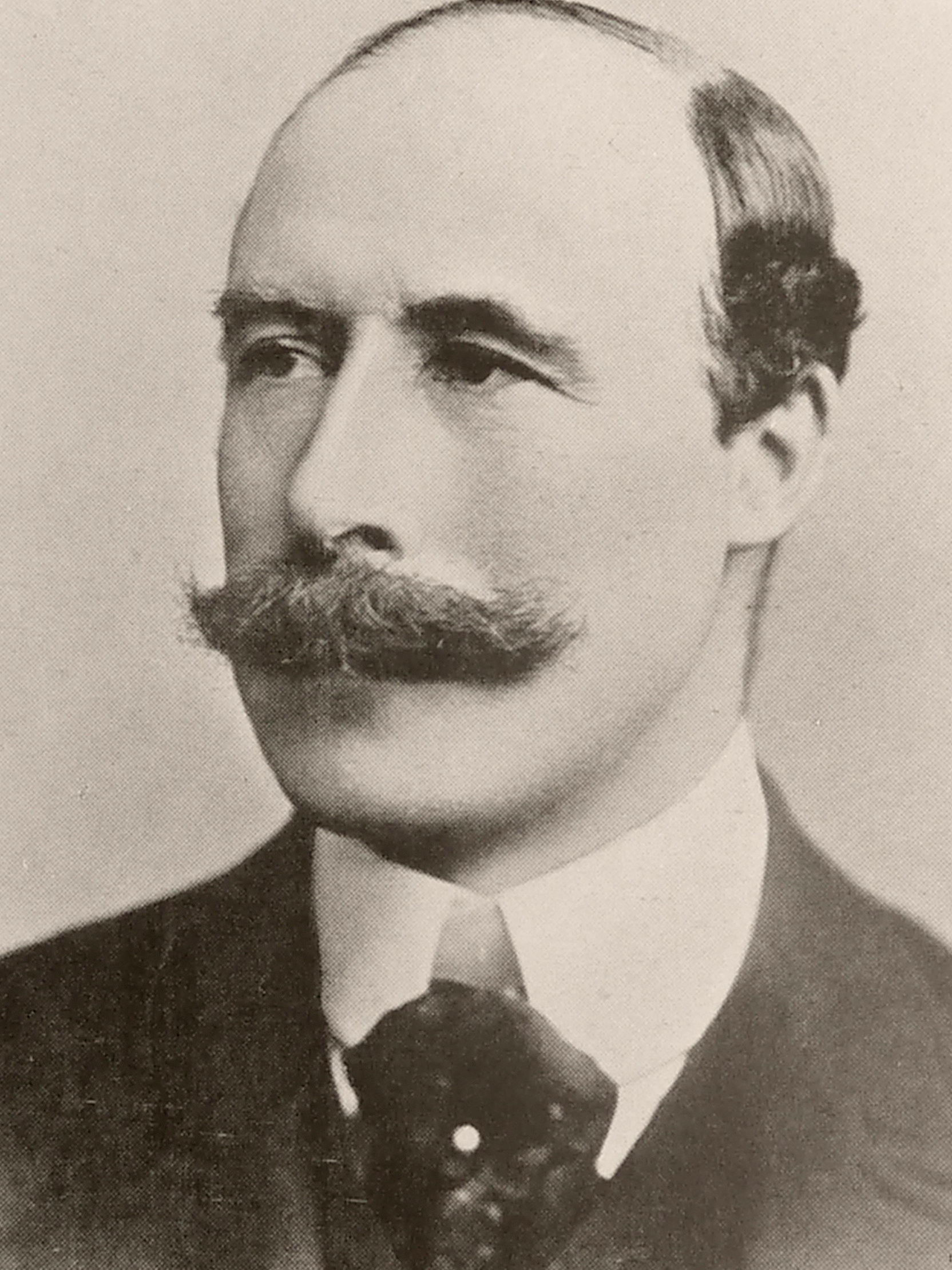
Ernest Beckett, Lord Grimthorpe

Ernest William Beckett, 2nd Baron Grimthorpe (born Ernest William Beckett-Denison; 25 November 1856 – 9 May 1917), was a British banker and Conservative politician who sat in the House of Commons from 1885 until 1905 when he inherited the Grimthorpe peerage.

== Early life ==
Beckett was the eldest son of William Beckett, younger son of Sir Edmund Beckett, 4th Baronet, and Hon. Helen Duncombe, daughter of William Duncombe, 2nd Baron Feversham. He was the nephew of Edmund Beckett, 1st Baron Grimthorpe, and great nephew of Sir John Beckett, 2nd Baronet.

Beckett was educated at Eton College and Trinity College, Cambridge, though he failed to complete his first year at university and dropped out to travel abroad. He later became a partner in the banking firm of Beckett & Co, of Leeds, owned by his father.

== Career ==
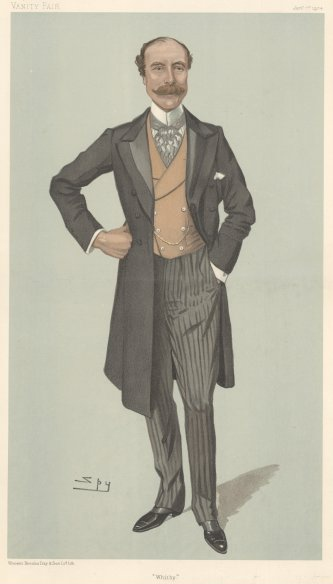
"Whitby". Beckett as caricatured by "Spy" (Leslie Ward) in Vanity Fair, January 1904

He was a major in the Yorkshire Hussars Yeomanry Cavalry, was commissioned as an Assistant Adjutant general in the Imperial Yeomanry on 28 February 1900, during the Second Boer War, and returned to the Yorkshire Hussars when he resigned from active duty in July 1902.

In 1885, Beckett was elected Member of Parliament for Whitby, a seat he held until 1905, though he is rarely mentioned in Hansard. In 1886, he resumed the name Beckett in place of Denison. In 1905, he succeeded his uncle Lord Grimthorpe as 2nd Baron according to a special remainder in the letters patent, as well as in the family baronetcy. However, he squandered much of his inherited family wealth and in 1905 he was also sacked as a senior partner in the family bank by his two brothers because of his expensive tastes and personal debts. He had once commissioned a bronze bust of his then fiancée Eve Fairfax from the famous sculptor Auguste Rodin.

In a 2010 biographical study, Michael Holroyd described Beckett as 'a man of swiftly changing enthusiasms ... a dilettante, philanderer, gambler and opportunist. He changed his career, his interests and his mistresses quite regularly.'

=== Italy ===
In 1904, Beckett bought a ruined farmhouse outside Ravello, on the Amalfi Coast in southern Italy. He transformed it into a fortified palace with towers, battlements and a mixture of Arabic, Venetian and Gothic details, and called it Villa Cimbrone. Between the house and the cliff edge, he built a garden, high above the Gulf of Salerno. The garden is an eccentric mixture of formal, English rose beds, Moorish tea houses, picturesque grottoes and classical temples. Today the house is a luxurious hotel, and the garden is open to the public.

== Personal life ==
On 4 October 1883, Ernest married an American, Lucy Tracy Lee, the only child of William Pray Lee and Lucy Eldredge Tracy when he was 26 and she was 18. Lucy died on 9 May 1891, six days after their son's birth. They had three children:

- Lucy Catherine Beckett (born 1884), who married Count Otto Czernin von und zu Chudenitz, the Austro-Hungarian Minister to Bulgaria, in 1903. They divorced in 1920 and she remarried to Captain Oliver Harry Frost, son of Robert Frost (not the poet), in 1926 (divorced 1941).
- Helen Muriel Beckett (1886–1916)
- Ralph William Ernest Beckett (1891–1963).

Beckett is also believed to have been the father of Violet Trefusis (1894–1972), whose mother, Alice Keppel was a mistress of King Edward VII. Today, Violet is mainly remembered for her lengthy affair with the poet Vita Sackville-West, which the two women continued after their respective marriages.

He also fathered a son, Lancelot Ernest Cecil, in 1895 by the Johannesburg socialite and hostess José Brink Dale Lace, married to mining magnate, John Dale Lace. In 1901, Ernest became engaged to Eve Fairfax, but the engagement was broken a few years later. During this time, he commissioned a bust of Eve from sculptor Auguste Rodin, which was the first of several Rodin made using Eve as a model. Rodin and Eve became close friends during the sittings for these busts.

Lord Grimthorpe died in April 1917, aged 60, at a sanatorium in Banchory, Aberdeenshire. He was succeeded in the baronetcy and barony by his son, Ralph Beckett. Lord Grimthorpe's younger brother, Gervase Beckett, also sat as a Conservative Member of Parliament and was created a baronet in 1921 (see Beckett baronets). His ashes are interred in the gardens of his beloved Villa Cimbrone.

=== Descendants ===
His only son was the father of Christopher John Beckett, who became the 4th Baron Grimthorpe upon Ralph's death in 1963. Another grandson, by his daughter Lucy, Manfred Beckett Czernin (1913–1962) was a distinguished Royal Air Force pilot and Special Operations Executive operative.

== Legacy ==
In Leeds, Beckett Park is named after Lord Grimthorpe.

In 2013, it was announced that the Board of Governors at Leeds Metropolitan University had applied to the privy council to change their name to Leeds Beckett University, named after the location of the university's founding colleges, Beckett Park.

== Arms ==
Coat of arms of Ernest Beckett, 2nd Baron Grimthorpe
Crest A boar's head couped Or pierced by a cross patée fitchée erect Gules. Escutcheon Gules a fess between three boars' heads couped Erminois. Supporters Two sangliers Erminois each gorged with a collar and pendant therefrom an escutcheon Gules charged with a cross patée fitchée Or. Motto Prodesse Civibus (To Serve The State)

Parliament of the United Kingdom
Preceded by Arthur Pease	Member of Parliament for Whitby; 1885–1905	Succeeded by Noel Buxton
Peerage of the United Kingdom
Preceded by Edmund Beckett	Baron Grimthorpe; 1905–1917	Succeeded by Ralph Beckett
Baronetage of the United Kingdom
Preceded by Edmund Beckett	Baronet (of Leeds); 1917–1963	Succeeded by Ralph Beckett
