= Noel Murless Stakes =

Flat horse race in Britain

- Class: Listed
- Location: Ascot Racecourse; Ascot, England
- Race type: Flat / Thoroughbred
- Sponsor: BetMGM
- Website: Ascot

Race information
- Distance: 1m 6f 34y (2,847 m)
- Surface: Turf
- Track: Right-handed
- Qualification: Three-year-olds
- Weight: 9 st 3 lb Allowances; 5 lb for fillies Penalties; 5 lb for Group winners * 3 lb for Listed winners* * since 31 March
- Purse: £100,000 (2025); 1st: £56,710

Noel Murless Stakes
2026
Infraad	Galiyan	Galilean Quality

Previous years
2025
Fantasy World	Nightwalker	Arabian Force
2024
Subsequent	Allonsy	Pappano
2023
Middle Earth	Chesspiece	Naqeeb
2022
El Habeeb	Giavellotto	Lionel
2021
Scope	Chalk Stream	Mandoob

2020-2011
2020
Berkshire Rocco	Albaflora	Without A Fight
2019
Hereby	Sapa Inca	Almania
2018
Ghostwatch	Mekong	Austrian School
2017
Raheen House	Weekender	Hochfeld
2016
Alyssa	Fireglow	Platitude
2015
Mill Springs	Secateur	Pin Up
2014
Big Orange	Marzocco	Mizzou
2013
Nichols Canyon	Greatwood	Refectory
2012
Biographer	Sir Graham Wade	Cavaleiro
2011
Barbican	Highland Castle	Solar Sky

2010-2002
2010
Harris Tweed	Ship's Biscuit	Western Pearl
2009
Akmal	Nehaam	Manifest
2008
Savarain	Fiulin	The Betchworth Kid
2007
Lion Sands	Spanish Hidalgo	Veenwouden
2006
Novellara	Zurbaran	Cresta Gold
2005
Art Eyes	Centaurus	Tawqeet
2004
Tungsten Strike	Carte Diamond	Lochbuie
2003
Hilbre Island	Singleton	Gold Medallist
2002
Tholjanah	Sorcerous	Lady's Secret

The Noel Murless Stakes is a Listed flat horse race in Great Britain open to three year old horses. It is run at Ascot over a distance of 1 mile 6 furlongs and 34 yards (2,847 metres), and it is scheduled to take place each year in late September or early October.

The race was first run in 2002 and is named after Noel Murless (1910-1987), a racehorse trainer who was British flat racing Champion Trainer on nine occasions.

Prior to 2011, it was run at Newmarket Racecourse.

== Winners ==
Year	Winner	Jockey	Trainer	Time
2002	Tholjanah	Richard Hills	Marcus Tregoning	2:56.90
2003	Hilbre Island	Michael Hills	Brian Meehan	2:56.86
2004	Tungsten Strike	Martin Dwyer	Amanda Perrett	2:56.93
2005	Art Eyes	John Egan	David Elsworth	2:51.59
2006	Novellara	Richard Hughes	Henry Cecil	3:00.40
2007	Lion Sands	Ryan Moore	Luca Cumani	2:54.45
2008	Savarain	Frankie Dettori	Luca Cumani	2:51.83
2009	Akmal	Richard Hills	John Dunlop	2:54.43
2010	Harris Tweed	Liam Jones	William Haggas	3:00.69
2011	Barbican	Darryll Holland	Alan Bailey	3:04.11
2012	Biographer	Ted Durcan	David Lanigan	3:09.26
2013	Nichols Canyon	William Buick	John Gosden	3:09.68
2014	Big Orange	Tom Queally	Michael Bell	2:59.36
2015	Mill Springs	Robert Havlin	John Gosden	3:05.99
2016	Alyssa	Fran Berry	Ralph Beckett	3:03.59
2017	Raheen House	Jamie Spencer	Brian Meehan	3:09.76
2018	Ghostwatch	William Buick	Charlie Appleby	3:03.98
2019	Hereby	Harry Bentley	Ralph Beckett	3:14.77
2020	Berkshire Rocco	Oisin Murphy	Andrew Balding	3:19.85
2021	Scope	Rob Hornby	Ralph Beckett	3:09.03
2022	El Habeeb	Andrea Atzeni	Kevin Philippart De Foy	3:05.76
2023	Middle Earth	Oisin Murphy	John and Thady Gosden	3:06.72
2024	Subsequent	Oisin Murphy	Andrew Balding	3:12.29
2025	Fantasy World	Rob Hornby	Andrew Balding	3:12.08
2026	Infraad	Tom Marquand	William Haggas	3:06.08

== See also ==
- Horse racing in Great Britain
- List of British flat horse races
