= Scope (horse) =

Irish Thoroughbred racehorse

- Sire: Teofilo
- Grandsire: Galileo
- Dam: Look So
- Damsire: Efisio
- Sex: Colt
- Foaled: 24 March 2018
- Died: 28 June 2022 (aged 4)
- Country: Ireland
- Colour: Chestnut
- Breeder: Lawn Stud
- Owner: Julian Richmond-Watson
- Trainer: Ralph Beckett
- Record: 8: 3-2-1
- Earnings: £288,636

Major wins
- Noel Murless Stakes (2021); Prix Royal-Oak (2021)

Scope (24 March 2018 – 28 June 2022) was an Irish-bred, British-trained Thoroughbred racehorse. After winning his only start as a two-year-old in 2020 he developed into a top-class stayer in the autumn of the following year, winning the Noel Murless Stakes and the Prix Royal-Oak.

== Background ==
Scope was a chestnut colt with no white markings bred in Ireland by her owner, Julian Richmond-Watson's Lawn Stud. He was sent into training with Ralph Beckett at Kimpton, Hampshire.

He was from the tenth crop of foals sired by the Teofilo the undefeated European Champion Two-Year-Old of 2006. Teofilo's other European offspring have included Cross Counter, Trading Leather, Pleascach, Twilight Payment and Parish Hall: he has also had great success in Australia where his major winners have included Happy Clapper, Humidor and Kermadec. Scope's dam Look So showed modest racing ability, winning four minor races from eight attempts, but was a half-sister to the Epsom Oaks winner Look Here.

== Racing career ==
=== 2020: two-year-old season ===
Scope made his racecourse debut in a novice race (for horses with no more than two previous wins) over one mile on heavy ground at Newbury Racecourse on 23 October when he was ridden by Rob Hornby and started a 16/1 outsider in a fifteen-runner field. After starting slowly he began to make progress at half way and produced a strong late run to catch Mojo Star on the line and win by a nose.

=== 2021: three-year-old season ===
On his first appearance as a three-year-old Scope contested a novice race at Newmarket Racecourse over ten furlongs on 15 April when he finished second to Al Waqidi, beaten half a length by the winner after hanging to the right in the closing stages. At Lingfield Park in May he was stepped up in class and distance for the Listed Derby Trial Stakes. His chances were compromised when he lost a shoe in the race but he never looked likely to win as he came home third behind Third Realm and Adayar.

After a break of over three months, Scope returned in the Group 2 Great Voltigeur Stakes (a major trial race for the St Leger) over one and a half miles at York Racecourse on 18 August. He started a 28/1 outsider and raced in second place for most of the way before being outpaced in the closing stages and coming home in fifth place, two and a quarter lengths behind the winner Yibir. In the St Leger over fourteen and a half furlongs at Doncaster Racecourse on 11 September he went off at odds of 28/1 and finished sixth of the ten runners behind Hurricane Lane. On 1 October Scope was dropped in class for the Listed Noel Murless Stakes over fourteen furlongs at Ascot Racecourse and started the 13/8 favourite against five opponents. Chalk Stream set off in front and opened up a lead of at least ten lengths before Scope overtook him approaching the final furlong and drew away to win by seven and a half lengths, despite being eased down by Rob Hornby in the closing stages. After the race Ralph Beckett said "This lad missed the summer because of an issue so I was always rushing a little to get him to the Great Voltigeur in August. I might have a think about the Prix Royal-Oak for him, it's three weeks on Sunday, so that wouldn't be impossible."

As Beckett had suggested, Scope was sent to France to contest the Group 1 Prix Royal-Oak over 3100 metres on very soft ground at Longchamp Racecourse on 24 October. With Hornby in the saddle he started the 7.6/1 fifth choice in the betting behind Skazino (Prix Kergorlay), Search For A Song, Kemari (Queen's Vase) and Valia (Prix Maurice de Nieuil) in a twelve-runner field which also included Glycon (Grand Prix de Deauville) and Call The Wind (Prix du Cadran). Scope settled in third place behind Alkuin and Zero Ten before moving up to challenge for the lead in the straight. He was briefly headed by Skazino but stayed on well to regain the advantage and won by a length. Beckett commented "I wasn't sure about today, so it's just fantastic... he was impressive at Ascot, and he has been again today... At the beginning of the year I thought this horse might be a St. Leger horse and his form has worked out sensationally all along, going back to Mojo Star as a 2-year-old and the Lingfield Derby Trial. It's a great family and it was always going to throw up another really good one at some point. It just happened to be him. That's what we should concentrate on and thank our lucky stars".

=== 2022: four-year-old season ===
He was put down on 28 June 2022 after sustaining a serious injury during a routine exercise.

== Pedigree ==
Pedigree of Scope (IRE), chestnut colt, 2018
Sire Teofilo (IRE) 2004	Galileo (IRE); 1998	Sadler's Wells (USA)	Northern Dancer (CAN)
Sire Teofilo (IRE) 2004	Galileo (IRE); 1998	Sadler's Wells (USA)	Fairy Bridge
Sire Teofilo (IRE) 2004	Galileo (IRE); 1998	Urban Sea (USA)	Miswaki
Sire Teofilo (IRE) 2004	Galileo (IRE); 1998	Urban Sea (USA)	Allegretta (GB)
Sire Teofilo (IRE) 2004	Speirbhean (IRE); 1998	Danehill (USA)	Danzig
Sire Teofilo (IRE) 2004	Speirbhean (IRE); 1998	Danehill (USA)	Razyana
Sire Teofilo (IRE) 2004	Speirbhean (IRE); 1998	Saviour (USA)	Majestic Light
Sire Teofilo (IRE) 2004	Speirbhean (IRE); 1998	Saviour (USA)	Victorian Queen (CAN)
Dam Look So (GB) 2004	Efisio (GB); 1982	Formidable (USA)	Forli (ARG)
Dam Look So (GB) 2004	Efisio (GB); 1982	Formidable (USA)	Native Partner
Dam Look So (GB) 2004	Efisio (GB); 1982	Eldoret (IRE)	High Top
Dam Look So (GB) 2004	Efisio (GB); 1982	Eldoret (IRE)	Bamburi (GB)
Dam Look So (GB) 2004	Last Look (GB); 1995	Rainbow Quest (USA)	Blushing Groom (FR)
Dam Look So (GB) 2004	Last Look (GB); 1995	Rainbow Quest (USA)	I Will Follow
Dam Look So (GB) 2004	Last Look (GB); 1995	Derniere Danse	Gay Mecene (USA)
Dam Look So (GB) 2004	Last Look (GB); 1995	Derniere Danse	Dance Quest (FR) (Family: 1-l)
