= Edmund Beckett Denison =

Edmund Beckett Denison may refer to:

- Sir Edmund Beckett, 4th Baronet (1787–1874), who was known by this name 1816–1872
- Edmund Beckett, 1st Baron Grimthorpe (1816–1905), son of the above, earlier known as Sir Edmund Beckett, 5th Baronet, lawyer and architect
