= Christopher Beckett, 4th Baron Grimthorpe =

British soldier and landowner (1915–2003)

The Right Honourable The Lord Grimthorpe OBE DL

Member of the House of Lords
- Lord Temporal
- as a hereditary peer 22 February 1963 – 11 November 1999
- Preceded by: The 3rd Baron Grimthorpe
- Succeeded by: Seat abolished (Note: Under the House of Lords Act 1999.)

Personal details
- Born: Christopher John Beckett; 16 September 1915
- Died: 6 July 2003 (aged 87)
- Political party: Conservative
- Occupation: Banker, horse breeder

Brigadier Christopher John Beckett, 4th Baron Grimthorpe, OBE, DL (16 September 1915 – 6 July 2003), was a soldier, company director, landowner and peer of the realm.

== Personal life ==
Christopher John Beckett was born 16 September 1915, eldest son of Ralph Beckett, 3rd Baron Grimthorpe (1891–1963), a partner in the banking firm of Beckett and Co., of Leeds, Yorkshire, by his first wife, Mary Alice Archdale, daughter of Colonel Mervyn Archdale, 12th Lancers, and Mary Kate de Bathe, daughter of Sir Henry de Bathe, 4th Baronet. He grew up at Easthorpe Hall, Malton, in North Yorkshire, where his father and his second wife, Angela, ran a stud where they bred Flagrant Mac, which won the Scottish Grand National in 1952. The best horse they owned, however, was Fortina, winner of the 1947 Cheltenham Gold Cup.

Beckett was educated at Eton. He succeeded his father as fourth Baron and eighth Baronet in 1963.

On 17 February 1954, he married Lady Elizabeth Lumley, daughter of Roger Lumley, 11th Earl of Scarbrough, of Lumley Castle, Lord Chamberlain to the Queen. The wedding took place at the Queen's Chapel, Marlborough Gate, sometimes called the Marlborough House Chapel, by special permission of the sovereign, and the wedding reception took place at St James's Palace. Queen Elizabeth The Queen Mother, Princess Margaret, and the Duchess of Gloucester attended. In 1973 Lady Grimthorpe joined the household of the Queen Mother as a Lady of the Bedchamber, and remained in that post at Clarence House until the death of Her Majesty.

Grimthorpe was a director of Thirsk Race Committee, and was a member of the Jockey Club. He also served as a consultant and sales representative with Sir Alfred McAlpine and Son Ltd. In 1973 he joined the board of Yorkshire Post Newspapers, of which his uncle, the Hon. Rupert Beckett, had been chairman for 30 years, 1920–1950. Grimthorpe was appointed OBE (military) in 1958.

A memorial service was held at York Minster on 16 July 2003. He is survived by Lady Grimthorpe, two sons, Edward John and Ralph Daniel (Danny) Beckett, and a daughter, Harriet.

== Military career ==
Grimthorpe had a distinguished military career, retiring from the Army in 1968 as a brigadier.

He was Colonel Commanding the 9th Queen's Royal Lancers from 1955 to 1958 and Brigadier Royal Armoured Corps Western Command from 1961 to 1964. He was deputy commander of HQ Malta and Libya from 1964 to 1967 and served as an ADC to the Queen.

In retirement he was a Deputy Lieutenant for North Yorkshire from 1969 and Colonel of the 9th/12th Lancers from 1973 to 1978.

== Arms ==
Coat of arms of Christopher Beckett, 4th Baron Grimthorpe
Crest A boar's head couped Or pierced by a cross patée fitchée erect Gules. Escutcheon Gules a fess between three boars' heads couped Erminois. Supporters Two sangliers Erminois each gorged with a collar and pendant therefrom an escutcheon Gules charged with a cross patée fitchée Or. Motto Prodesse Civibus (To Serve The State)

== Notes ==
Peerage of the United Kingdom
Preceded by Ralph Beckett	Baron Grimthorpe; 1963–2003; Member of the House of Lords (1963–1999)	Succeeded by Edward Beckett
Baronetage of the United Kingdom
Preceded by Ralph Beckett	Baronet of Leeds; 1963–2003	Succeeded by Edward Beckett
