= Baron Grimthorpe =

Barony in the Peerage of the United Kingdom

Baron Grimthorpe, of Grimthorpe in the East Riding of the County of York, is a title in the Peerage of the United Kingdom. It was created on 17 February 1886 for the lawyer and architect Edmund Beckett, 5th Baronet, with remainder to the heirs male of his father. He was succeeded according to the special remainder by his nephew, the second Baron. He had earlier represented Grimsby in Parliament. As of 2014 the titles are held by the latter's great-grandson, the fifth Baron, who succeeded his father in 2003.

The Beckett baronetcy, of Leeds in the County of York, was created in the Baronetage of the United Kingdom in 1813 for John Beckett, Permanent Under-Secretary of State at the Home Office. His eldest son, the second Baronet, was a Tory politician. On his death the title passed to his younger brother, the third Baronet, and then to another brother, the fourth Baronet. The latter represented the West Riding of Yorkshire in Parliament. He was succeeded by his eldest son, the fifth Baronet, who was raised to the peerage as Baron Grimthorpe in 1886.

Another member of the Beckett family was the Conservative politician Gervase Beckett. He was the younger brother of the second Baron Grimthorpe.

== Beckett baronets, of Leeds (1813) ==
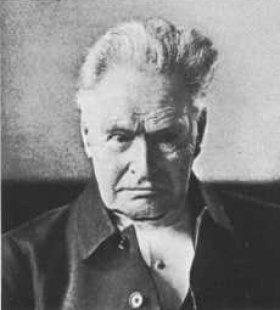
Edmund Beckett, 1st Baron Grimthorpe

- Sir John Beckett, 1st Baronet (1743–1826)
- Sir John Beckett, 2nd Baronet (1775–1847)
- Sir Thomas Beckett, 3rd Baronet (1779–1872)
- Sir Edmund Beckett, 4th Baronet (1787–1874)
- Sir Edmund Beckett, 5th Baronet (1816–1905) (created Baron Grimthorpe in 1886)

=== Barons Grimthorpe (1886) ===
- Edmund Beckett, 1st Baron Grimthorpe (1816–1905)
- Ernest William Beckett, 2nd Baron Grimthorpe (1856–1917)
- Ralph William Ernest Beckett, 3rd Baron Grimthorpe (1891–1963)
- Christopher John Beckett, 4th Baron Grimthorpe (1915–2003)
- Edward John Beckett, 5th Baron Grimthorpe (born 1954)

The heir apparent is the present holder's son, Hon. Harry Maximilian Beckett (born 1993).

=== Title succession chart ===
Title succession chart, Beckett baronets and Barons Grimthorpe

Sir John Beckett; 1st Baronet; 1743–1826
Sir John Beckett; 2nd Baronet; 1775–1847	Sir Thomas Beckett; 3rd Baronet; 1779–1872	Richard Beckett; 1782–1809	William Beckett; 1784–1868	Sir Edmund Beckett; 4th Baronet; 1787–1874
Baron Grimthorpe
Edmund Beckett; 1st Baron Grimthorpe; 5th Baronet; 1816–1905	Christopher Beckett- Denison; 1825–1884	William Beckett- Denison; 1826–1890
Ernest Beckett; 2nd Baron Grimthorpe; 1856–1917
Ralph Beckett; 3rd Baron Grimthorpe; 1891–1963
Christopher Beckett; 4th Baron Grimthorpe; 1915–2003
Edward Beckett; 5th Baron Grimthorpe born 1954
Hon. Harry Beckett born 1993

== Arms ==
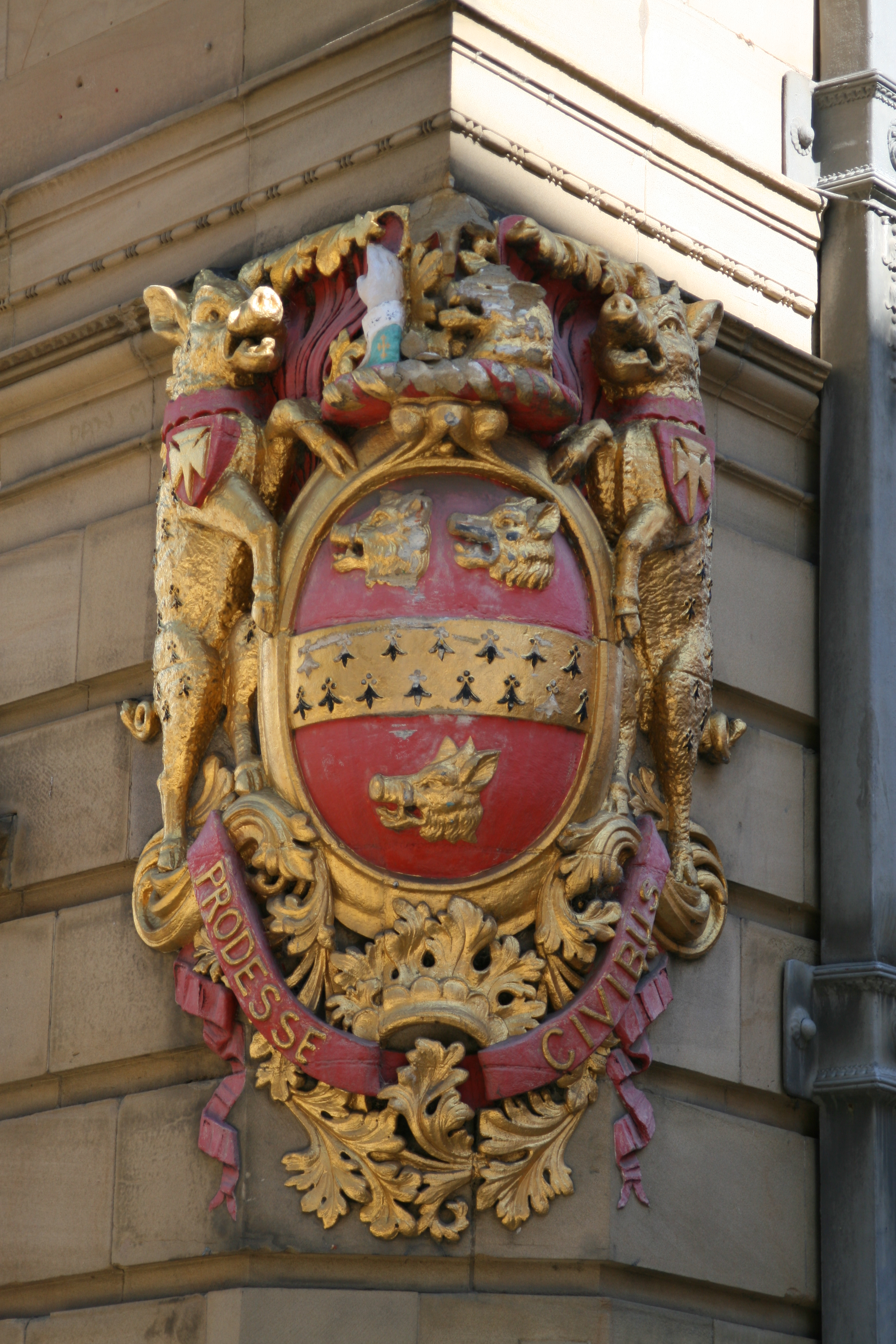
Arms of the Beckett family

Coat of arms of Baron Grimthorpe
Crest A boar’s head couped Or pierced by a cross patée fitchée erect Gules. Escutcheon Gules a fess between three boars' heads couped Erminois. Supporters Two sangliers Erminois each gorged with a collar and pendant therefrom an escutcheon Gules charged with a cross patée fitchée Or. Motto Prodesse Civibus (To Serve The State)

== See also ==
- Beckett baronets of Kirkdale Manor

== Notes ==
Baronetage of the United Kingdom
Preceded by Jackson baronets	Beckett baronets of Leeds; 2 November 1813	Succeeded by Broke-Middleton baronets
