= Silver Tankard Stakes =

Flat horse race in Britain

- Class: Listed
- Location: Pontefract Racecourse; Pontefract, England
- Inaugurated: 1993
- Race type: Flat / Thoroughbred
- Sponsor: British Stallion Studs
- Website: Pontefract

Race information
- Distance: 1m 6y (1,615 metres)
- Surface: Turf
- Track: Left-handed
- Qualification: Two-year-olds
- Weight: 9 st 5 lb Allowances; 5 lb for fillies Penalties; 5 lb for Group winners 3 lb for Listed winners
- Purse: £40,000 (2025); 1st: £22,684

Silver Tankard Stakes
2026
King High	Tyrrhenian Thunder	Game Character

Previous years
2025
Shayem	Rochfortbridge	Daydreama
2024
Tuscan Hills	Calla Lagoon	Basalt
2022
Local Dynasty	Luckin Brew	Caernarfon
2021
Mr Professor	Westover	Approachability

2020-2011
2020
Pythagoras	Mystery Angel	The Rosstafarian
2019
King Carney	Wyclif	Grand Rock
2018
Manuela De Vega	Three Comets	I'll Have Another
2017
Connect	Lisheen Castle	Dark Acclaim
2016
D'bai	Al Hamdany	Forest Ranger
2015
Thanksfortellingme	Beast Mode	Percy Street
2014
Prince Gagarin	Teofilo's Princess	My Reward
2013
Lady Heidi	Safety Check	Riverboat Springs
2012
Willie The Whipper	Oasis Cannes	Top Notch Tonto
2011
Letsgoroundagain	Ptolemaic	Stipulate

2010-2001
2010
Zenella	Royal Exchange	Rigolleto
2009
Gallic Star	Tominator	Namecheck
2008
Playfellow	Mishrif	Laahig
2007
Siberian Tiger	Latin Lad	Alan Devonshire
2006
Sweet Lilly	Champlain	Empire Day
2005
Nakheel	Dream Fantasy	Startori
2004
Viva Pataca	Wise Dennis	Haunting Memories
2003
New Mexican	Makfool	Carte Sauvage
2002
Battle Chant	Inchberry	Black Belt Shopper
2001
Bandari	Infinite Spirit	White Rabbit

2000-1993
2000
Worthily	Rathkenny	Marine
1999
Hataab	Paradise Garden	Bogus Dreams
1998
Three Green Leaves	Swallow Flight	Mixsterthetrixster
1997
Gulland	Rambling Rose	Clapham Common
1996
Entice	Fahris	Symonds Inn
1995
Weet-A-Minute	Warbrook	Mushahid
1994
Kalabo	Sayeh	Naked Welcome
1993
Barbaroja	The Flying Phantom	Alaflak

The Silver Tankard Stakes is a Listed flat horse race in Great Britain open to two-year-old horses. It is run at Pontefract over a distance of 1 mile and 6 yards (1,615 metres), and it is scheduled to take place each year in October.

== History ==
The event was established in 1993, and the inaugural running was won by Barbaroja. It has held Listed status throughout its history.

The Silver Tankard Stakes is currently staged on the third or fourth Monday in October. It is part of Pontefract's last racing fixture of the year.

== Records ==
Leading jockey (2 wins):

- Michael Hills – Entice (1996), Gulland (1997)
- Richard Hills – Hataab (1999), Nakheel (2005)
- Seb Sanders – Battle Chant (2002), Comic Strip (2004)
- Adam Kirby - Prince Gagarin (2014), Connect (2017)
- William Buick - D'bai (2016), Local Dynasty (2022)

Leading trainer (4 wins):

- Mick Channon – Worthily (2000), Sweet Lilly (2006), Siberian Tiger (2007), Gallic Star (2009)

== Winners ==
Year	Winner	Jockey	Trainer	Time
1993	Barbaroja	Walter Swinburn	Jimmy FitzGerald	1:48.20
1994	Kalabo	Willie Ryan	Henry Cecil	1:48.80
1995	Weet-a-Minute	Kieren Fallon	Reg Hollinshead	1:43.60
1996	Entice	Michael Hills	Barry Hills	1:47.20
1997	Gulland	Michael Hills	Geoff Wragg	1:47.90
1998	Three Green Leaves	Joe Fanning	Mark Johnston	1:47.50
1999	Hataab	Richard Hills	Ed Dunlop	1:46.60
2000	Worthily	John Reid	Mick Channon	1:51.60
2001	Bandari	Kevin Darley	Mark Johnston	1:48.50
2002	Battle Chant	Seb Sanders	Ed Dunlop	1:47.10
2003	New Mexican (Note: The 2003 winner New Mexican was later exported to Hong Kong and renamed Golden Sun)	Jamie Spencer	Lynda Ramsden	1:44.18
2004	Comic Strip (Note: The 2004 winner Comic Strip subsequently raced in Hong Kong as Viva Pataca)	Seb Sanders	Sir Mark Prescott	1:46.45
2005	Nakheel	Richard Hills	Mark Johnston	1:47.02
2006	Sweet Lilly	Tony Culhane	Mick Channon	1:49.32
2007	Siberian Tiger	Tadhg O'Shea	Mick Channon	1:46.77
2008	Playfellow	Philip Robinson	Michael Jarvis	1:51.25
2009	Gallic Star	Chris Catlin	Mick Channon	1:46.94
2010	Zenella	Paul Hanagan	Ann Duffield	1:45.28
2011	Letsgoroundagain	William Carson, Jr.	Charles Hills	1:47.42
2012	Willie the Whipper	Graham Lee	Ann Duffield	1:53.48
2013	Lady Heidi	Silvestre de Sousa	Philip Kirby	1:53.52
2014	Prince Gagarin	Adam Kirby	Ed Dunlop	1:52.58
2015	Thanksfortellingme	Richard Kingscote	Ralph Beckett	1:48.94
2016	D'bai	William Buick	Charlie Appleby	1:49.66
2017	Connect	Adam Kirby	Clive Cox	1:51.87
2018	Manuela de Vega	Harry Bentley	Ralph Beckett	1:46.85
2019	King Carney	Daniel Tudhope	Charlie Fellowes	1:50.76
2020	Pythagoras	Paul Hanagan	Richard Fahey	1:50.99
2021	Mr Professor	Silvestre de Sousa	Alice Haynes	1:51.54
2022	Local Dynasty	William Buick	Charlie Appleby	1:46.42
2023	Abandoned due to waterlogging
2024	Tuscan Hills	David Egan	Raphael Freire	1:53.21
2025	Shayem	Clifford Lee	Karl Burke	1:48.60
2026	King High	Cieren Fallon	Owen Burrows	1:49.70

== See also ==
- Horse racing in Great Britain
- List of British flat horse races
