= Edward Beckett, 5th Baron Grimthorpe =

British peer (born 1954)

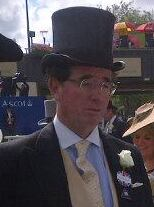
Lord Grimthorpe in 2012

Edward John "Teddy" Beckett, 5th Baron Grimthorpe DL (born 20 November 1954), is a British peer. He was racing manager to the late Prince Khalid Abdullah Al Saud.

== Family background and early life ==
Lord Grimthorpe is the elder son of the late Christopher Beckett, 4th Baron Grimthorpe, and Elizabeth, Lady Grimthorpe, formerly Lady Elizabeth Lumley, daughter of Lawrence Lumley, 11th Earl of Scarbrough, of Lumley Castle, County Durham. He became 5th Baron Grimthorpe on the death of his father in 2003.

Lord Grimthorpe's father, the 4th Baron, was a keen horseman with a reputation as a shrewd gambler. He was a member of the Jockey Club and a director of Thirsk Racecourse, and kept a number of horses in training. His stud at Westow Hall, which he re-established in 1965, was responsible for breeding Mrs McArdy, winner of the 1,000 Guineas in 1977. Grimthorpe's grandfather, the 3rd Baron, won the Cheltenham Gold Cup with Fortina in 1947.

The present Lord Grimthorpe has been a keen racegoer from an early age. In an interview with the Racing Post he remembered having two shillings with his mother on Larkspur to win the Derby in 1962. As a schoolboy he saw Brigadier Gerard's only loss, to Roberto at York in 1972.

Grimthorpe was educated at Harrow School.

Grimthorpe served as a page at the wedding of Prince Edward, Duke of Kent, to Katharine Worsley on 8 June 1961.

== Racing manager ==
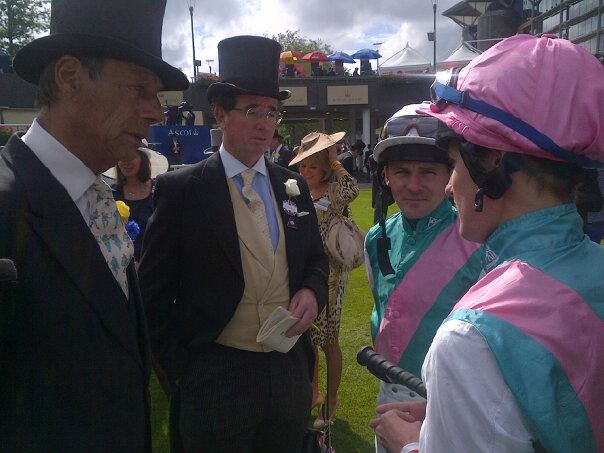
Lord Grimthorpe (centre) talking to jockeys Ian Mongan and Tom Queally at Royal Ascot in 2012. Sir Henry Cecil is to Lord Grimthorpe's right.

Lord Grimthorpe had a successful career as a bloodstock agent, working for more than twenty years at the British Bloodstock Agency, whom he joined as his first employment, and buying horses on behalf of, among others, the Duke of Devonshire. In 1999 he became Prince Khalid Abdullah's racing manager, succeeding Grant Pritchard-Gordon. He is responsible for overseeing the Prince's worldwide Juddmonte Farms racing operation, which in 2011 involved 700–800 horses across ten farms in the United Kingdom, Ireland and the United States, and about 250 horses in training with 13 different trainers.

He has been widely praised for his contribution to a lengthy period of considerable success for the Juddmonte operation. In 2003 Prince Khalid had 78 winners in Britain and 58 in France, making him champion owner in both those countries; he also finished third in the American owners' championship that year. The prince was British flat racing's champion owner again in 2010, with 74 winners and prize money of more than £3 million; and he took the title once more in 2011, when he had 63 winners and won prize money totaling more than £3.4 million.

Lord Grimthorpe was elected to the Jockey Club in December 2007 and in 2011 he was appointed chairman of the race committee at York Racecourse. He was appointed a deputy lieutenant of Cambridgeshire in 2023.

== Personal life ==
Lord Grimthorpe married Carey Elisabeth McEwen in 1992. The marriage was dissolved in 2009. They have one son, Hon. Harry Maximillian Beckett, born 28 April 1993. Lord Grimthorpe married Emma Benyon (née Villiers, and the former wife of Conservative Party politician Richard Benyon) on 14 June 2013. The horseracing trainer Ralph Beckett is Lord Grimthorpe's cousin.

== Arms ==
Coat of arms of Edward Beckett, 5th Baron Grimthorpe
Crest A boar’s head couped Or pierced by a cross patée fitchée erect Gules. Escutcheon Gules a fess between three boars’ heads couped Erminois. Supporters Two sangliers Erminois each gorged with a collar and pendant therefrom an escutcheon Gules charged with a cross patée fitchée Or. Motto Prodesse Civibus (To Serve The State)

Peerage of the United Kingdom
Preceded by Christopher Beckett	Baron Grimthorpe; 2003–present	Incumbent; Heir apparent: Hon. Harry Beckett
Baronetage of the United Kingdom
Preceded by Christopher Beckett	Baronet (of Leeds); 2003–present	Incumbent; Heir apparent: Hon. Harry Beckett
