= Batchwood Hall =

Manor house in Hertfordshire, England

Coordinates: 51.76636°N 0.35520°W

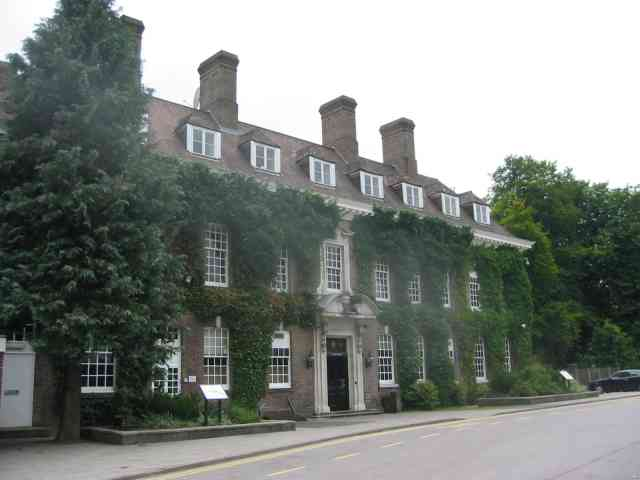
Batchwood Hall

Batchwood Hall is a manor house in St Albans, Hertfordshire

== History ==
The house was designed in the Queen Anne style and built for Edmund Beckett, 1st Baron Grimthorpe in 1874. Beckett is known for his work restoring St Albans Cathedral. He also had an interest in horology and the house contains the prototype of the Great Clock in the clock tower at the Palace of Westminster.

The site was acquired by St Albans Council in 1935 when John Henry Taylor was commissioned to design and establish an 18-hole golf course in the grounds. The house became an event venue in the 1970s. An arson attack resulted in the complete destruction of the Batchwood Tennis and Golf Centre in August 2011. It operated as a vaccination centre, organised by a consortium of local GPs, during the COVID-19 pandemic.
