= Richard Kingscote =

British jockey

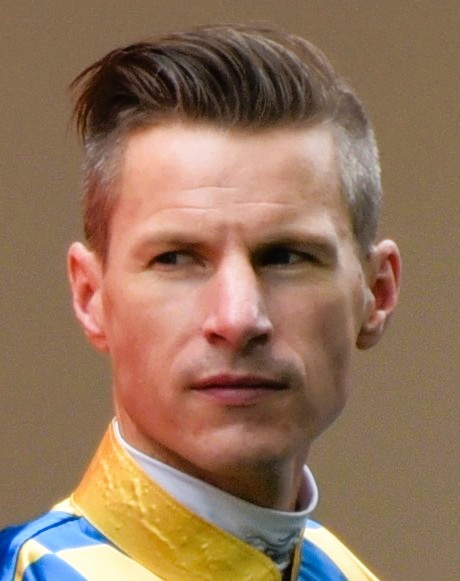
- Kingscote in February 2026

Personal information
- Nationality: British
- Born: 19 July 1986 (age 40)
- Occupation: Flat racing jockey

Horse racing career
- Sport: Horse racing
- Career wins: 1,646+ (ongoing)

Significant horses
- Brown Panther; Desert Crown

Richard Kingscote (born July 1986) is a British jockey who competes in flat racing. He won the 2022 Epsom Derby on Desert Crown.

== Background ==
Kingscote grew up in Weston-super-Mare in a family with no racing connections and started riding as a child. He attended the British Racing School and was then apprenticed to trainer Roger Charlton.

== Career ==
Kingscote rode his first winner in 2004. In 2008 he became a stable jockey to trainer Tom Dascombe. On 10 July 2008, he achieved his first success in a Group race when winning the Group 2 July Stakes at Newmarket on the Dascombe-trained Classic Blade. He won his first Group 1 race in September 2014 when riding the Dascombe-trained Brown Panther in the Irish St. Leger at the Curragh. In November 2014 he broke his wrist, elbow, and collar-bone in a fall at Wolverhampton but recovered in time to ride Brown Panther to victory in the Dubai Gold Cup in March 2015.

On 4 June 2022, Kingscote won the Derby on the 5/2 favourite Desert Crown, trained by Sir Michael Stoute. It was only his second ride in the Derby, having previously been unplaced on Knight to Behold in 2018. In 2025, he added to his tally of Group 1 wins with victories on outsiders at Royal Ascot and the Goodwood Festival. Time for Sandals won the Commonwealth Cup at odds of 25/1 and then Qirat, who had been supplemented into the race as a pacemaker for odds-on favourite Field of Gold, won the Sussex Stakes at odds of 150/1, a record for a Group 1 race.

As of late November, 2026 he has over 1,640 career wins.

== Personal life ==
Kingscote is married to pastry chef Ashleigh and has two sons. He rides motorbikes and has a lot of tattoos.

== Major wins ==
(United Kingdom) Great Britain

- Epsom Derby - (1) - Desert Crown (2022)
- Champion Stakes - (1) - Bay Bridge (2022)
- Commonwealth Cup - (1) - Time For Sandals (2025)
- Sussex Stakes - (1) - Qirat (2025)

(Republic of Ireland) Ireland

- Irish St. Leger - (1) - Brown Panther (2014)
- Flying Five Stakes - (1) - Havana Grey (2018)
