= Desert Crown =

British Thoroughbred racehorse (2019–2023)

- Sire: Nathaniel
- Grandsire: Galileo
- Dam: Desert Berry
- Damsire: Green Desert
- Sex: Colt
- Foaled: 2 March 2019; Teversham, Cambridgeshire, England
- Died: 23 October 2023 (aged 4); Newmarket Equine Hospital; Newmarket, Suffolk, England
- Country: United Kingdom
- Colour: Bay
- Breeder: Strawberry Fields Stud
- Owner: Saeed Suhail
- Trainer: Michael Stoute
- Record: 4: 3-1-0
- Earnings: £1,031,201

Major wins
- Dante Stakes (2022); Epsom Derby (2022); Timeform rating: 129
- Last updated on 24 October 2023

Desert Crown (2 March 2019 – 23 October 2023) was a British Thoroughbred racehorse. After winning his only race as a juvenile in 2021, he took the Dante Stakes on his three-year-old debut and then maintained his unbeaten record by winning the Epsom Derby. He ran only once more due to injury and was euthanised in October 2023 after failing to recover from a serious leg injury earlier that season.

== Background ==
Desert Crown was born on 2 March 2019. He was a bay colt with a white star and white sock on his left hind leg; he was bred in England by the Cambridgeshire-based Strawberry Fields Stud. In October 2020, the yearling was put up for auction at the Tattersalls Sale and was bought for 280,000 guineas by Blandford Bloodstock on behalf of the Dubai businessman Saeed Suhail. He was sent into training with Michael Stoute at Freemason Lodge Stables in Newmarket.

Desert Crown was from the sixth crop of foals sired by Nathaniel who won the King George VI and Queen Elizabeth Stakes in 2011 and the Eclipse Stakes in the following year. His other foals have included Enable, Channel, and Lady Bowthorpe. His dam Desert Berry showed modest racing ability in a brief racing career, winning one minor race from three starts, but did better as a broodmare, producing four other winners. As a descendant of the British broodmare Suntime, she was distantly related to several major winners including Quiet Fling, Byword, and Bethrah.

== Racing career ==
=== 2021: two-year-old season ===
Desert Crown began his racing career in a maiden race over eight-and-a-half furlongs on soft ground at Nottingham Racecourse on 3 November when he was ridden by Richard Kingscote and started at odds of 11/1 in an eleven-runner field. He raced close behind the leaders before taking the lead inside the last quarter mile and won "readily" by five-and-a-half lengths from Schmilsson despite showing his inexperience ("ran green") in the closing stages.

=== 2022: three-year-old season ===
For his first run as a three-year-old, Desert Crown was stepped up sharply in class for the Group 2 Dante Stakes (a major trial race for the Epsom Derby) over 10 1/2 furlongs at York Racecourse on 22 May. Before the race, Stoute said that the colt was short of full fitness after his training was interrupted by what he described as a "minor hiccup". With Kingscote in the saddle, Desert Crown started the 7/2 joint favourite alongside the Royal Lodge Stakes winner Royal Patronage while the other six runners included the Criterium de Saint-Cloud, winner El Bodegon. After racing towards the rear of the field, he moved up to take the lead two furlongs from the finish and despite hanging to the right in the closing stages he stayed on well to win by three and a quarter lengths from Royal Patronage. After the race, Stoute, who was winning the race for a record-equaling seventh time, commented "I was really impressed with him... He's got further to go at Epsom, but I'd be very hopeful it wouldn't be a problem."

On 4 June, Desert Crown started the 5/2 favourite for the 243rd running of the Derby over 1 1/2 miles at Epsom Racecourse. His sixteen opponents included Stone Age (Derrinstown Stud Derby Trial), Nations Pride (Newmarket Stakes), Changingoftheguard (Chester Vase), Piz Badile (Ballysax Stakes), Star of India (Dee Stakes), Westover (Sandown Classic Trial), Royal Patronage, Nahanni (Blue Riband Trial Stakes), and Masekela (Denford Stakes). Kingscote settled the colt in sixth or seventh place as Changingoftheguard set the pace, before moving up on the outside early in the straight and taking the lead approaching the last quarter mile. He quickly opened up a clear lead on his rivals and, despite hanging to the left and being eased down in the final strides, he won by 2 1/2 lengths from the 150/1 outsider Hoo Ya Mal. After training his sixth Derby winner, Michael Stoute said "We were very hopeful after York that he might win the Derby. But, you know, the performance delighted me because he had won a long way out. He's got such a good mind... I was very happy with where he was positioned when he got to the top of the hill. He's a good athlete and he floated down the hill. It's a wonderful thrill."

=== 2023: four-year-old season ===
Desert Crown made his return to the racecourse in May 2023, finishing second to Hukum in the Brigadier Gerard Stakes. He was being prepared for a run in the International Stakes when he suffered a fractured fetlock in August 2023. Desert Crown was treated for the injury but was euthanised on 23 October 2023, at age 4.

== Pedigree ==
Pedigree of Desert Crown (GB), bay colt, 2019
Sire Nathaniel (IRE) 2008	Galileo (IRE); 1998	Sadler's Wells (USA)	Northern Dancer (CAN)
Sire Nathaniel (IRE) 2008	Galileo (IRE); 1998	Sadler's Wells (USA)	Fairy Bridge
Sire Nathaniel (IRE) 2008	Galileo (IRE); 1998	Urban Sea (USA)	Miswaki
Sire Nathaniel (IRE) 2008	Galileo (IRE); 1998	Urban Sea (USA)	Allegretta (GB)
Sire Nathaniel (IRE) 2008	Magnificient Style (USA); 1993	Silver Hawk	Roberto
Sire Nathaniel (IRE) 2008	Magnificient Style (USA); 1993	Silver Hawk	Gris Vitesse
Sire Nathaniel (IRE) 2008	Magnificient Style (USA); 1993	Mia Karina	Icecapade
Sire Nathaniel (IRE) 2008	Magnificient Style (USA); 1993	Mia Karina	Basin
Dam Desert Berry (GB) 2009	Green Desert (USA); 1983	Danzig	Northern Dancer (CAN)
Dam Desert Berry (GB) 2009	Green Desert (USA); 1983	Danzig	Pas de Nom
Dam Desert Berry (GB) 2009	Green Desert (USA); 1983	Foreign Courier	Sir Ivor
Dam Desert Berry (GB) 2009	Green Desert (USA); 1983	Foreign Courier	Courtly Dee
Dam Desert Berry (GB) 2009	Foreign Language (USA); 2003	Distant View	Mr Prospector
Dam Desert Berry (GB) 2009	Foreign Language (USA); 2003	Distant View	Seven Springs
Dam Desert Berry (GB) 2009	Foreign Language (USA); 2003	Binary (GB)	Rainbow Quest
Dam Desert Berry (GB) 2009	Foreign Language (USA); 2003	Binary (GB)	Balabina (GB) (Family: 1-p)

- Desert Crown was inbred 4×4 to Northern Dancer, meaning that this stallion appears twice in the fourth generation of his pedigree.
