= Doncaster Racecourse =

Racecourse in South Yorkshire, England

Coordinates: 53°31′13″N 1°5′48″W

Doncaster

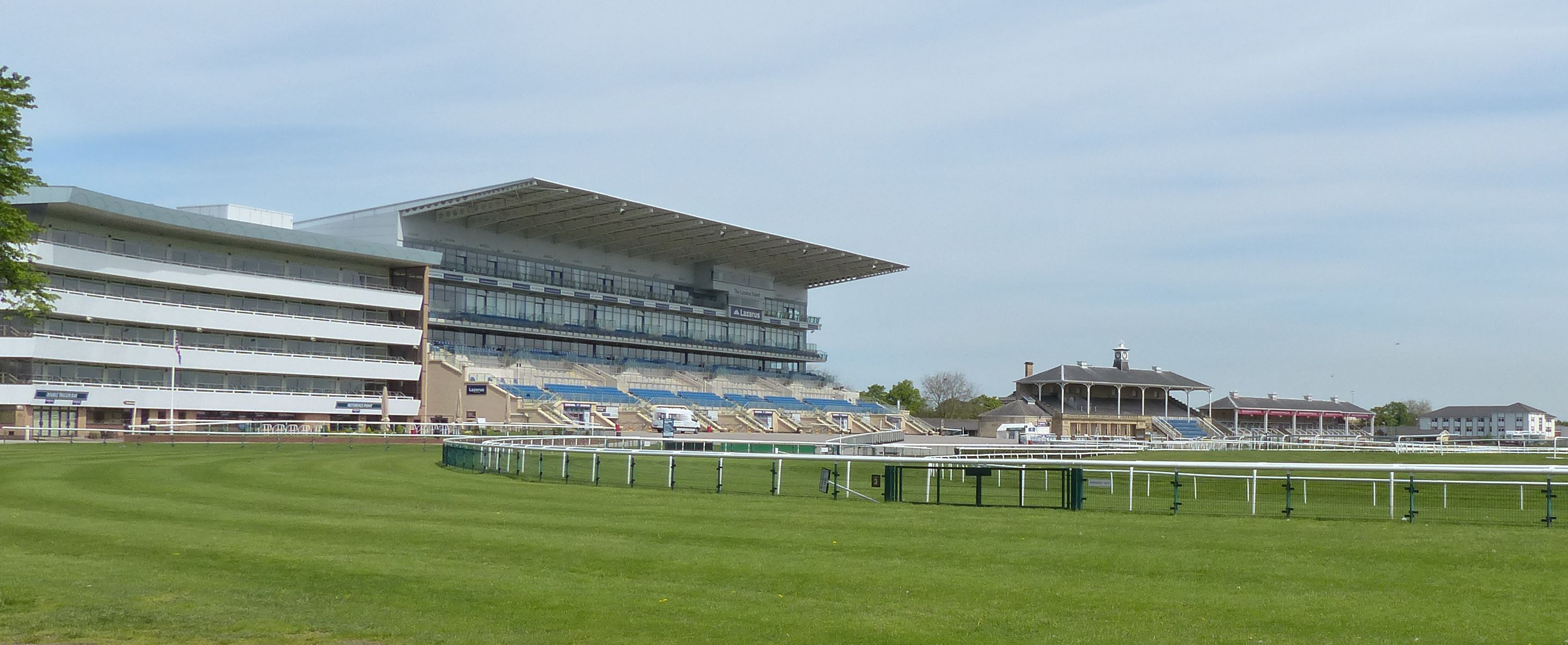
- The stands in 2013
- Interactive map of Doncaster
- Location: Doncaster, South Yorkshire
- Owned by: Arena Racing Company
- Screened on: Sky Sports Racing
- Course type: Flat; National Hunt, Left-handed
- Notable races: Lincoln Handicap; Doncaster Cup; St. Leger Stakes; Futurity Trophy; Great Yorkshire Chase

Doncaster Racecourse (also known as Town Moor) is a racecourse in Doncaster, South Yorkshire, England. It hosts two of Great Britain's 36 annual Group 1 flat races, the St Leger Stakes and the Futurity Trophy.

Racing is recorded as having taken place in Doncaster in the 16th century, although it ceased from 1600 to 1614 due to unruly crowds. With backing from the town's Corporation, racing flourished, and was elevated to national significance after the introduction of races like the Doncaster Cup and St Leger Stakes in the second half of the 18th century. Racing has continued ever since despite interruptions in wartime, with facilities having been vastly enhanced in the 2000s.

The course hosts both flat and National Hunt racing on a left-handed, flat circuit, and usually hosts over thirty racedays throughout the year. These include the St Leger Meeting, which is held over four days in September.

== History ==
=== Early history ===
Doncaster is one of the oldest (and the largest in physical capacity) established centres for horse racing in Britain, with records of regular race meetings going back to the 16th century. The Town Corporation gained the land the course currently sits on (Town Moor, a former common) by a royal charter from Henry VIII. A map of 1595 already shows a racecourse at Town Moor. In 1600 the corporation tried to put an end to the races because of the number of ruffians they attracted, but by 1614 it acknowledged failure and instead marked out a racecourse at a cost of 1s 6d, and paid a man to keep the course clear during races. However, problems were outlined in a 1615 civic record:

For as much as it plainely appereth by divers accidents and inconveniences which tendeth to the great damage and prejudice of the Corporacon, and quarells and other inconveniences have by occasion of this race been stirred upp, therefore, for the preventing of sutes, quarrels, murders and bloodsheds that may ensue by the contynuinge of the said race, it is agreed that the stands and stoopes shall be pulled upp and employed to some better purpose, and the race to be discontinued.

Racing of course continued with Corporation backing, which became more generous over time. They promised £20 for the races in 1741 as long as two £50 plates were run for. However, racing appears to have ceased for a few years after only six runners turned out for a two-day meeting in 1746.

=== Prosperity and beginnings of the St Leger ===
In 1751 racing returned, with the meeting followed by a successful Race Ball. A new race called the Corporation Plate was first run in 1764 and the Doncaster Cup would be first run at Cantley Common in 1766. The latter continues to this day as the oldest regulated horse race in the world and the final leg of the British Stayers' Triple Crown.

Lt Col Anthony St Leger proposed running a two-mile sweepstake for twenty-five guineas which would end up being named in his honour in 1778. It was first run at Cantley Common in 1776 (not yet bearing his name), with five runners. The St Leger Stakes is now Britain's oldest Classic, run over 1m6½f (being reduced from two miles in 1813) for three-year-old entires. Racing moved to Town Moor in 1777 (away from the public land that was Cantley Common), when a grandstand designed by John Carr was constructed at a cost of £2,637. It was funded by selling silver badges for £7 each. In 1777, it was proposed that the St Leger be named after the Marquess of Rockingham, but he insisted the race bore St Leger's name, and it was first run with this name in 1778. The Park Hill Stakes is named after St Leger's residence at Firbeck.

=== 19th century ===
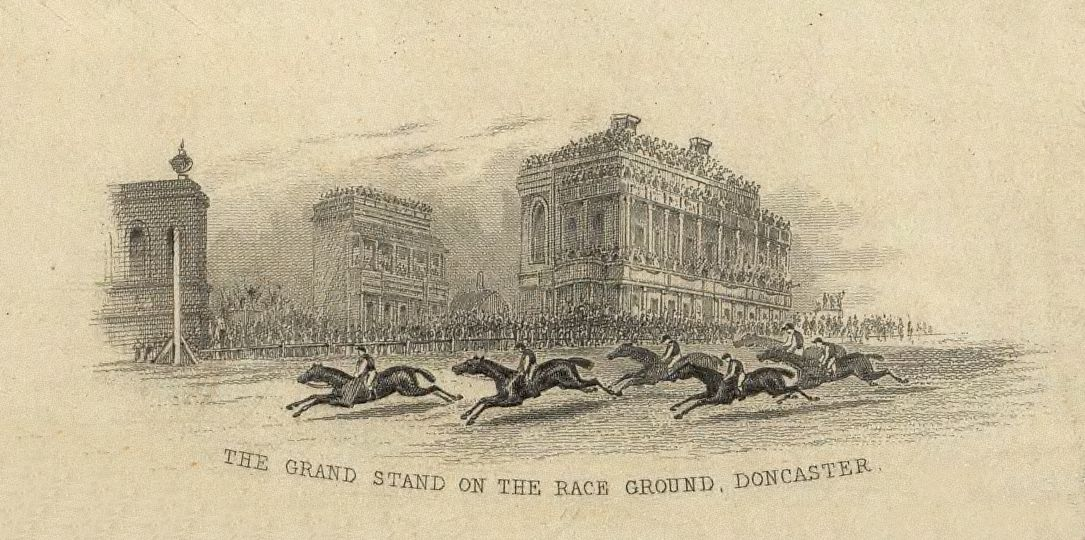
1851 engraving

The racecourse gained a hundred-guinea King's Plate from Burford in 1803, but was put under threat in 1841 by the Jockey Club. The Corporation planned to increase its contribution to the races by 200 guineas from the £500 already earmarked, yet the Jockey Club (under Lord George Bentinck) believed this was insufficient and delivered an ultimatum:

We require at least £1000 from the Corporation, and if the proposition is not acceded to, we will transfer our support to those race-courses where the proprietors are determined not to give as little as possible but to give all they can in support of the races. We know we have the power to destroy and annihilate your races, and we are determined to do so unless you are disposed to make annually so liberal a contribution as we think in justice and fairness you ought.

The Corporation provided the necessary funds, thus saving racing at Doncaster. The events proved to be extremely popular in the late 19th century, with 173 trains being used to transport people to the 1892 St Leger Festival, including one from London King's Cross at a cost of 12s 6d.

=== 20th and 21st centuries ===
During the First World War the racecourse was used for military purposes, and substitute races were run at Newmarket from 1915 to 1918. The racecourse also didn't operate in World War II, with the St Leger not being run in 1939. National Hunt racing returned for the first time since 1911 in December 1946, with the inaugural running of the Great Yorkshire Chase taking place in 1948 (the intended first running in 1947 having been cancelled due to the harsh winter); it was at this time more valuable than the Cheltenham Gold Cup, with prize money of £2,100.

The racecourse gained a new race in 1961, the Timeform Gold Cup (now known as the Group 1 Futurity Trophy). Doncaster also benefitted from the closure of Lincoln Racecourse in 1964, gaining the prestigious Lincoln Handicap. It was first run at Doncaster in 1965 and takes place on the first day of the British turf flat season, usually in March. It is usually run over the straight mile but was run on the round mile course in 1978. Incidentally, Doncaster also ends the turf flat season in the UK with the November Handicap. The racecourse was scheduled to host 24 racedays in 1975 over eleven meetings.

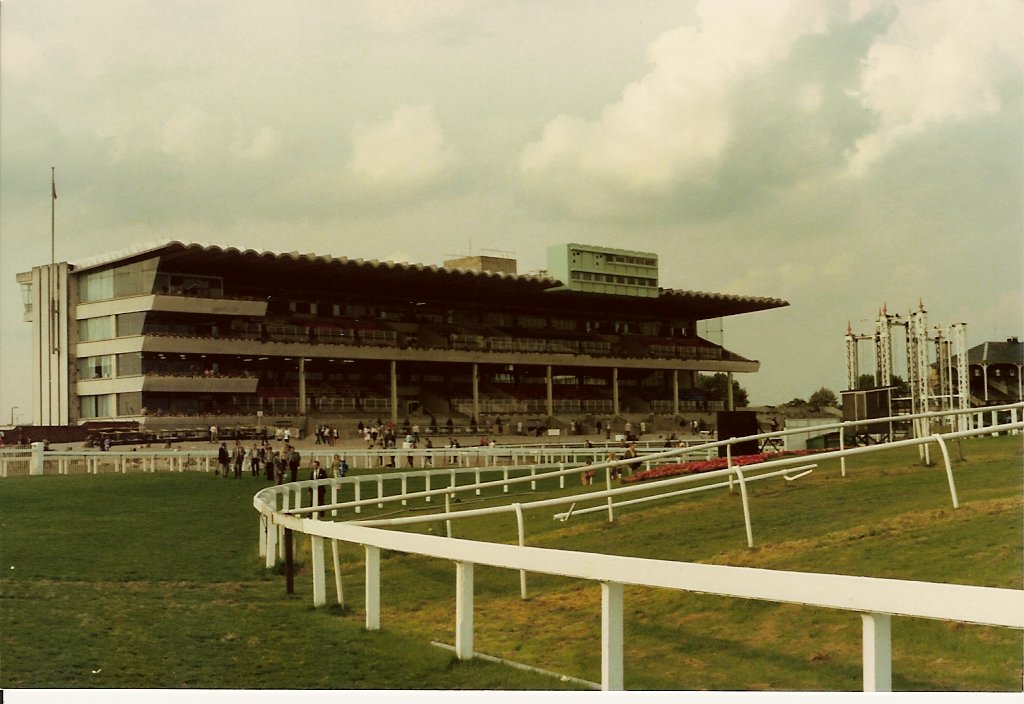
The 1960s-built grandstand

The John Carr grandstand survived for almost two hundred years, with plans to demolish it in 1939 and replace it with a more modern stand aborted due to the outbreak of war; the shabby structure was finally taken down and replaced in 1968 with a new stand with a covered betting hall built at a cost of £1mn.

Disaster struck during the 1989 St Leger meeting, when a three-horse pileup in the Portland Handicap on the Wednesday (the first day of the meeting) was followed by another fall on the first race of the Friday. This was caused by collapsed drains and led to abandonment of the rest of the meeting, and the St Leger was transferred to Ayr.

On 26 July 1992, more history was made at Doncaster when it staged the first ever Sunday meeting on a British racecourse. A crowd of 23,000 turned up despite the absence of betting.

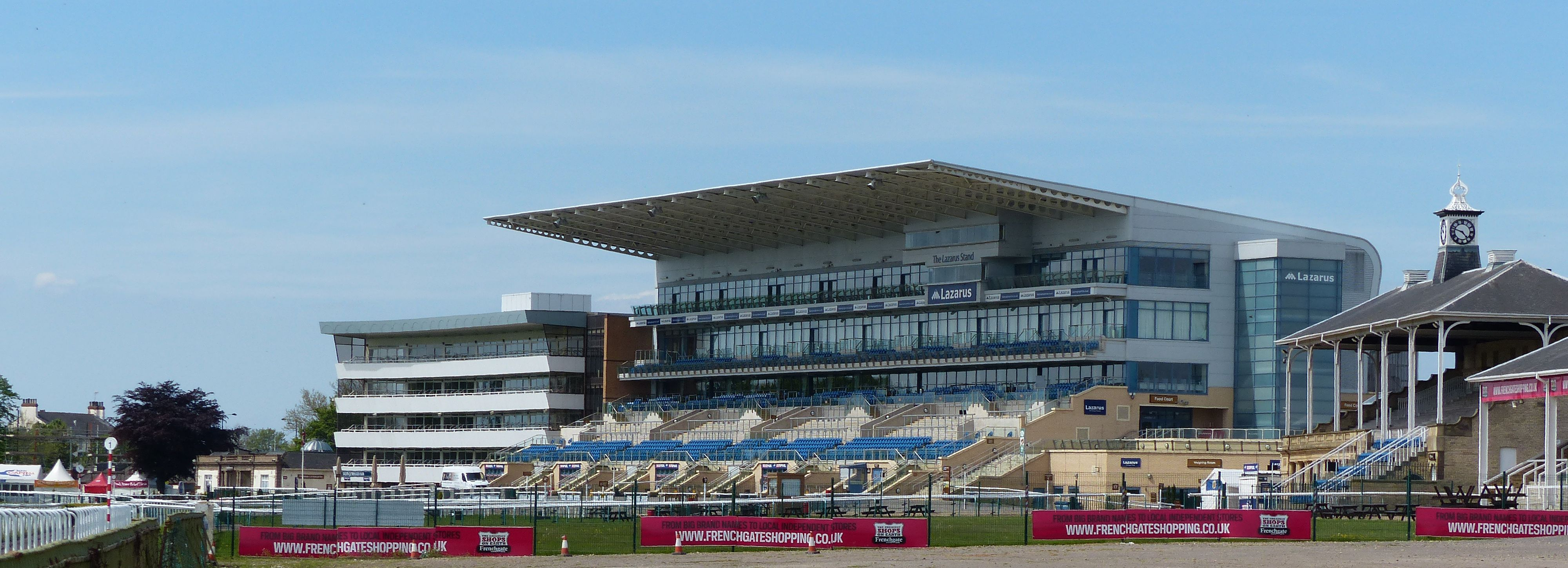
The current grandstand

From December 2005 to August 2007, the racecourse was closed as demolition and replacement of the 1960s grandstand took place, thus modernising the facilities. During this time, the Lincoln Handicap was run at Redcar (2006) and Newcastle (2007), whilst the 2006 St Leger took place at York. The new grandstand is 28m tall, 90m long and has five storeys, whilst the exhibition centre at the back of the stand has over 4,000m² of floor space. This has been used to count election results for the Doncaster area, including former Labour Party leader Ed Miliband's Doncaster North constituency.

In May 2023, five protesters from the animal rights pressure group Animal Rising sat on the course, delaying the start of a race; they were charged with causing a public nuisance but cleared of any wrongdoing.

== Course characteristics ==
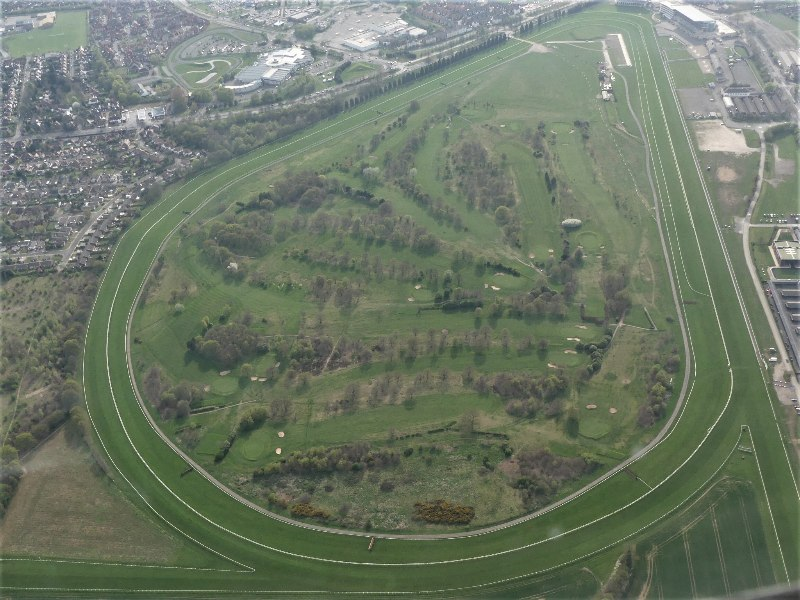
The round course from the air

Doncaster is a left-handed, pear-shaped, galloping track of around 1 mile 7½ furlongs (3.1 km) which is mostly flat, though there is one small uphill section. There is a sweeping turn around 4½ furlongs from the winning post. The flat course is one of the fairest in the country and has a wide straight course for races of distances between five furlongs and a mile. Eight-furlong races can also be run starting from a chute on the round course. The course drains exceptionally well, with testing going being rare. This makes the jumps course very suitable for speedy types, and the well-run nature of races resulting from this can put further emphasis on novice chasers' jumping, making the course more challenging for them.

The course was scheduled to host 35 racedays in 2026, eleven of which would be National Hunt and the remainder flat meetings.

== Notable races ==
| Month | DOW | Race Name | Type | Grade | Distance | Age/Sex |
|---|---|---|---|---|---|---|
| January | Saturday | Sir Nigel Gresley Fillies' Juvenile Hurdle | Hurdle | Listed | 2m ½f | 4yo f |
| January | Saturday | Yorkshire Rose Mares' Hurdle | Hurdle | Grade 2 | 2m ½f | 4yo+ m |
| January | Saturday | River Don Novices' Hurdle | Hurdle | Grade 2 | 3m ½f | 4yo+ |
| January | Saturday | Great Yorkshire Chase | Chase | Premier Handicap | 3m | 5yo+ |
| March | Saturday | Rose Hill Mares' Novices' Hurdle | Hurdle | Listed | 3m ½f | 5yo+ m |
| March | Saturday | Grimthorpe Handicap Chase | Chase | Handicap | 3m 2f | 5yo+ |
| March | Saturday | Brocklesby Stakes | Flat | Novice | 5f | 2yo |
| March | Saturday | Cammidge Trophy | Flat | Listed | 6f 2y | 3yo+ |
| March | Saturday | Doncaster Mile Stakes | Flat | Listed | 1m | 4yo+ |
| March | Saturday | Lincoln Handicap | Flat | Heritage Handicap | 1m | 4yo+ |
| July | Thursday | St Leger Trial | Flat | Novice | 1m 3f 197y | 3yo |
| September | Thursday | Weatherbys Scientific £300,000 2-Y-O Stakes | Flat | Sales | 6f 111y | 2yo |
| September | Thursday | May Hill Stakes | Flat | Group 2 | 1m | 2yo f |
| September | Thursday | Park Hill Stakes | Flat | Group 2 | 1m 6f 115y | 3yo+ f |
| September | Friday | Flying Scotsman Stakes | Flat | Listed | 7f | 2yo |
| September | Friday | Flying Childers Stakes | Flat | Group 2 | 5f | 2yo |
| September | Friday | Doncaster Cup | Flat | Group 2 | 2m 2f | 3yo+ |
| September | Saturday | Champagne Stakes | Flat | Group 2 | 7f | 2yo |
| September | Saturday | Portland Handicap | Flat | Heritage Handicap | 5f 140y | 3yo+ |
| September | Saturday | Park Stakes | Flat | Group 2 | 7f | 3yo+ |
| September | Saturday | St. Leger Stakes | Flat | Group 1 | 1m 6f 115y | 3yo |
| September | Sunday | Sceptre Stakes | Flat | Group 3 | 7f | 3yo+ f |
| October | Saturday | Futurity Trophy | Flat | Group 1 | 1m | 2yo |
| October | Saturday | Doncaster Stakes | Flat | Listed | 6f 2y | 2yo |
| November | Saturday | Wentworth Stakes | Flat | Listed | 6f 2y | 3yo+ |
| November | Saturday | Gillies Fillies' Stakes | Flat | Listed | 1m 2f 43y | 3yo+ f |
| November | Saturday | November Handicap | Flat | Handicap | 1m 3f 197y | 3yo+ |
| December | Saturday | Doncaster Mansion House Mares' Hurdle | Hurdle | Listed | 3m ½f | 3yo+ |
| December | 29th | Yorkshire Silver Vase Mares' Chase | Chase | Grade 2 | 2m 4½f | 4yo+ m |

== See also ==
- Listed buildings in Doncaster (Wheatley Hills and Intake Ward)

== Bibliography ==
- Barrett, Norman, ed. (1995). The Daily Telegraph Chronicle of Horse Racing. Enfield, Middlesex: Guinness Publishing.
- Gill, James (1975). Racecourses of Great Britain. London: Barrie & Jenkins. ISBN 0-2142-0090-6.
- Holland, Anne (1991). Classic Horse Races. London: MacDonald Queen Anne Press. ISBN 0356197085.
- Mortimer, Roger (1971). The Encyclopaedia of Flat Racing. London: Robert Hale. ISBN 0-7091-1531-8.
- Mortimer, Roger; Onslow, Richard; Willett, Peter (1978). Biographical Encyclopaedia of British Flat Racing. London: Macdonald and Jane's. ISBN 0-354-08536-0.
- Winn, Christopher (2010). I Never Knew That About Yorkshire. London: Random House. ISBN 978-0-09-193313-5.
