= Beckett baronets =

There have been two baronetcies created for members of the Beckett family, both in the Baronetage of the United Kingdom. Both are extant as of 2023.

- Beckett baronets of Leeds, Yorkshire (1813): see Baron Grimthorpe
- Beckett baronets of Kirkdale Manor (1921)
