= Beckett baronets of Kirkdale Manor (1921) =

Baronetcy

Escutcheon of the Beckett baronets of Kirkdale Manor

The Beckett baronetcy of Kirkdale Manor, Nawton in the North Riding of the County of York, was created in the Baronetage of the United Kingdom on 28 June 1921 for the newspaper proprietor and Conservative politician Gervase Beckett. He represented Whitby, Scarborough and Whitby and Leeds North in the House of Commons. Beckett was the nephew of the first Baron Grimthorpe and the younger brother of the second Baron.

== Beckett baronets, of Kirkdale Manor (1921) ==
- Sir (William) Gervase Beckett, 1st Baronet (1866–1937)
- Sir Martyn Gervase Beckett, 2nd Baronet (1918–2001), architect
- Sir Richard Gervase Beckett, 3rd Baronet, KC (born 1944).

The heir apparent is the present holder's son Walter Gervase Beckett (born 1987).
