= Rob Hornby =

British jockey

- Occupation: Flat racing jockey
- Born: 28 May 1995 (age 29)
- Nationality: British

Significant horses
- Scope; Westover

Robert Hornby (born 28 May 1995) is a British jockey who competes in flat racing. Riding as a freelance, his four Group 1 wins, as of 2023, have been for trainers Andrew Balding and Ralph Beckett.

== Background ==
Hornby grew up on a farm in Chelmarsh, Shropshire, and attended Bridgnorth Endowed School, leaving at the age of sixteen to become an apprentice at the Kingsclere yard of Andrew Balding.

== Career ==
Hornby achieved his first Group race success on 25 August 2018 when he rode the Balding-trained Maid Up to victory in the Group 3 March Stakes at Goodwood. His first Group 1 win was on Scope, trained by Ralph Beckett, in the Prix Royal-Oak at Longchamp in Paris on 24 October 2021. It was Hornby's first ride in France, and came after he had missed part of the season with a shoulder injury sustained during a fall at Wolverhampton in December 2020.

In 2022 Hornby rode the Beckett-trained Westover in the Epsom Derby. It was his first ride in the Derby. He had already ridden Westover in three of his four races, winning a maiden stakes at Sandown in August 2021, coming second in a conditions stakes at Newbury in September 2021 and then winning the Group 3 Sandown Classic Trial in April 2022. Westover started at odds of 25/1 in the Derby and finished in third place, having failed to get a clear run. Westover went on to win the Irish Derby, but the ride had been given to the more experienced Irish jockey Colin Keane. There was consolation for Hornby when he won two Group 1 races at the Newmarket July Festival, taking the Falmouth Stakes on the Beckett-trained Prosperous Voyage and the July Cup on the Balding-trained Alcohol Free. He continued his winning streak on the July Course at Newmarket when landing the Grey Horse Handicap on Strike a month later.

On 2 June, Hornby was given a seven-day suspension for failing to weigh in after riding Surrey Belle into third place in a handicap at Nottingham. Surrey Belle was disqualified and Hornby forfeited his riding fee. The suspension is scheduled from 16-22 June, meaning Hornby will miss Royal Ascot.

== Major wins ==
(United Kingdom) Great Britain

- Falmouth Stakes - (1) - Prosperous Voyage (2022)
- July Cup - (1) - Alcohol Free (2022)

France

- Prix Royal-Oak - (1) - Scope (2021)
- Grand Prix de Saint-Cloud - (1) - Westover (2023)
