= Edmund Beckett, 1st Baron Grimthorpe =

English lawyer and horologist (1816–1905)

The Right Honourable The Lord Grimthorpe KC
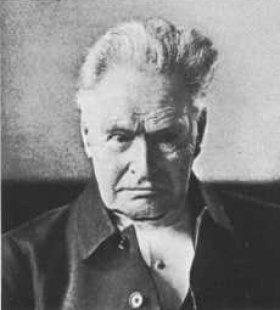
- Born: Edmund Mackenzie Sidmouth Beckett Denison; 12 May 1816; Carlton-on-Trent, Nottinghamshire, England
- Died: 29 April 1905 (aged 88); Batchwood Hall, St Albans, England
- Other name: Edmund Beckett Denison
- Education: Doncaster Grammar School; Eton College; Trinity College, Cambridge
- Occupations: Parliamentary barrister, mechanic, architect

Edmund Beckett, 1st Baron Grimthorpe, KC (12 May 1816 – 29 April 1905), known previously as Sir Edmund Beckett, 5th Baronet and Edmund Beckett Denison, was an English lawyer, mechanician, and controversialist, as well as a noted horologist and architect.

== Biography ==
Beckett was born at Carlton Hall near Newark, Nottinghamshire, England, and was the eldest son of Sir Edmund Beckett, 4th Baronet, MP for the West Riding of Yorkshire.

He was educated at Doncaster Grammar School for Boys (briefly), then Eton, and went on to read mathematics at Trinity College, Cambridge, where he graduated in the 1838 Tripos with the rank of "30th Wrangler".

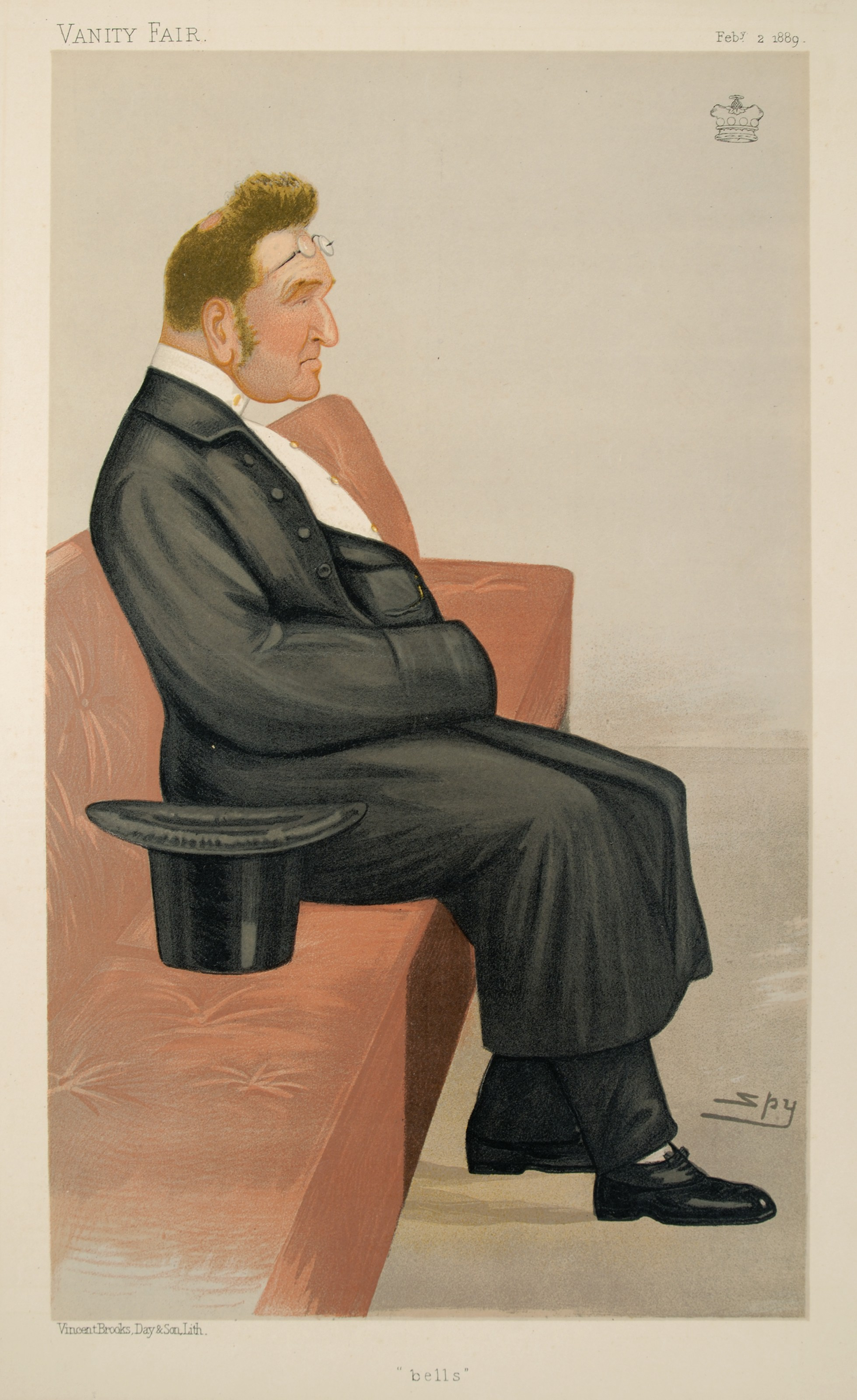
"Bells" Baron Grimthorpe as caricatured by Spy (Leslie Ward) in Vanity Fair, February 1889

Beckett began practising law in 1841 at Lincoln's Inn, becoming a leader of the parliamentary bar. He was made a Queen's Counsel in 1854, retiring in 1881. He was elected to the Royal Astronomical Society in 1866. He was elected to the presidency of the British Horological Institute in 1868, a position he accepted on the condition that he should not be asked to attend dinners. He was re-elected annually until his death. In 1877 he was appointed Chancellor and Vicar-General of the Diocese of York. He was created Baron Grimthorpe in 1886. He is sometimes known as Edmund Beckett Denison; his father had taken the additional name Denison in 1816, but the son dropped it on his father's death in 1874. He married Fanny Catherine (23 February 1823 – 8 December 1901), daughter of John Lonsdale, 89th Bishop of Lichfield.

In 1851, he designed the mechanism for the clock of the Palace of Westminster (the Houses of Parliament in London), responsible for the chimes of Big Ben.

In 1868 he worked with W. H. Crossland to design St Chad's Church, Far Headingley in Leeds on land given by his family.

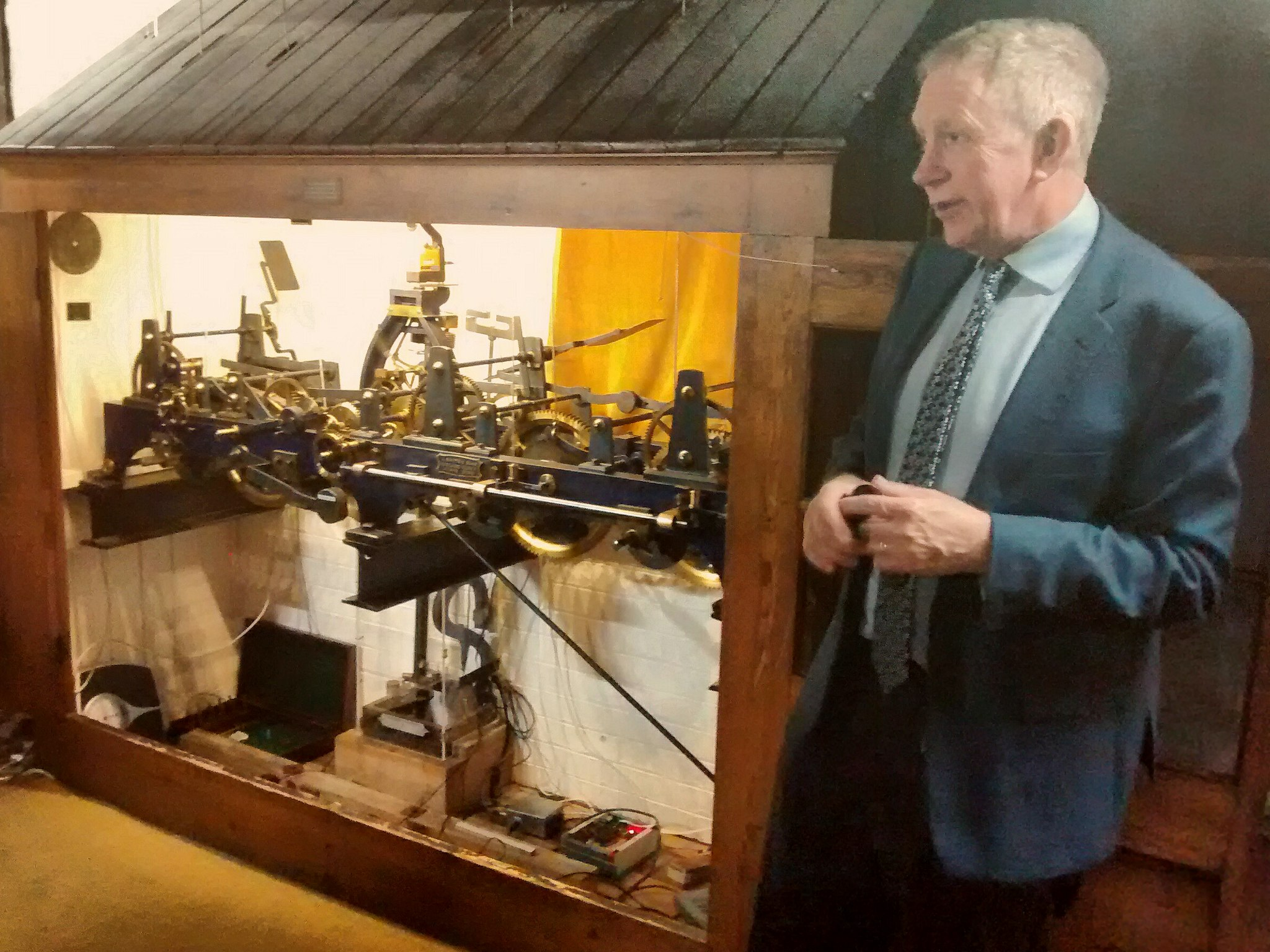
The Trinity College Clock mechanism was designed by Lord Grimthorpe

He was also responsible throughout the 1880s and 1890s for rebuilding the west front, roof, and transept windows of St Albans Cathedral at his own expense. Although the building had been in need of repair (and indeed considerable work had already been done since 1856 under the guidance of Sir George Gilbert Scott until his death in 1878, including making the central tower safe, correcting the listing of the south side of the nave, and reconstructing the shrine of Saint Alban), popular opinion at the time held that he had changed the cathedral's character, even inspiring the creation and temporary popularity of the verb "to grimthorpe", meaning to carry out unsympathetic restorations of ancient buildings. Part of Beckett's additions included statues of the four evangelists around the western door; the statue of St Matthew has Beckett's face. He later turned his attentions to St Peter's and then to St Michael's churches, both in the same city. He lived at Batchwood Hall from where he oversaw the restoration work on the cathedral.

He died on 29 April 1905 after a fall, and is buried in the grounds of St Albans Cathedral. His obituary in the Monthly Notices of the Royal Astronomical Society noted his mastery of ecclesiastical law, his publications (ranging from Astronomy without Mathematics to Clocks, Watches, and Bells (1903) to Building, Civil and Ecclesiastical) and noted "there was not a better locksmith in England."

== Quotation ==
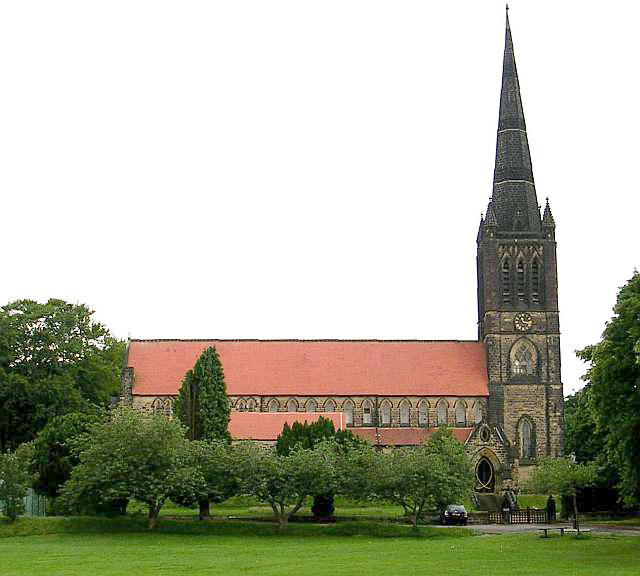
St Chad's Church, Far Headingley

- "I am the only architect with whom I have never quarrelled."

== Religious publications ==
- Six Letters on Dr. Todd's Discourses on the Prophecies Relating to Antichrist in the Apocalypse (1848)
- On the Origin of the Laws of Nature (1880)
- Should the Revised New Testament be Authorised? (1882)
- The Life of John Lonsdale, Bishop of Lichfield With Some of His Writings (1868)
- A Review of Hume and Huxley on Miracles (1883)

== Other works ==
- Astronomy Without Mathematics (1871)

== Arms ==
Coat of arms of Edmund Beckett, 1st Baron Grimthorpe
Crest A boar’s head couped Or pierced by a cross patée fitchée erect Gules. Escutcheon Gules a fess between three boars' heads couped Erminois. Supporters Two sangliers Erminois each gorged with a collar and pendant therefrom an escutcheon Gules charged with a cross patée fitchée Or. Motto Prodesse Civibus (To Serve The State)

Peerage of the United Kingdom
New creation	Baron Grimthorpe; 1886–1905	Succeeded by Ernest William Beckett
Baronetage of the United Kingdom
Preceded by Edmund Beckett	Baronet (of Leeds); 1874–1905	Succeeded by Ernest William Beckett
