= West Riding of Yorkshire (constituency) =

Parliamentary constituency in the United Kingdom, 1832–1865

- Former county constituency for the House of Commons
- Boundary of West Riding of Yorkshire in Yorkshire for the 1832 general election

- Location of Yorkshire within England
- County: West Riding of Yorkshire

1832–1865
- Seats: Two
- Created from: Yorkshire
- Replaced by: Northern West Riding of Yorkshire, and Southern West Riding of Yorkshire

West Riding of Yorkshire was a parliamentary constituency in England from 1832 to 1865. It returned two Members of Parliament (MPs) to the House of Commons of the Parliament of the United Kingdom.

== Boundaries and history ==
This constituency comprised part of Yorkshire, the largest of the ancient counties of England. Between 1826 and 1832 the undivided county constituency had returned four Members of Parliament to the House of Commons, instead of the traditional two knights of the shire which the county had sent before then and all other English counties elected up until 1832.

The Reform Act 1832 divided Yorkshire into three county constituencies, which each returned two members. The divisions were based on the three ridings, which were traditional sub-divisions of Yorkshire. The West Riding occupied the southwestern part of the county. The parliamentary constituency covered the whole West Riding, as the non-resident owners of forty shilling freeholds in the parliamentary boroughs enclaved within the area thereby acquired a county franchise.

The polling place for the West Riding, at which the hustings were held and the result was declared, was at Wakefield. Unusually for British elections detailed results by polling district are available for a by-election in 1835 and the general elections of 1837 and 1841. These details are given in the Elections section below and provide a list of major towns in the area. Electors had to declare their votes (verbally and in public), as this was before the introduction of the secret ballot. (Source: Stooks Smith).

Charles Seymour, in Electoral Reform in England and Wales, commented about the debate in 1832 about the non resident freeholder vote. This was a particularly important issue for the West Riding because the major towns of Bradford, Leeds and Sheffield and the important ones of Halifax, Huddersfield and Wakefield were all to become new parliamentary boroughs in 1832.

Though the general principle of the freeholder franchise was accepted without debate, one aspect of the question gave rise to much discussion at the time ... . The bill provided that the freeholders in boroughs who did not occupy their property should vote in the counties in which the borough was situated. This clause drew forth a torrent of complaint, especially from the Conservatives. Peel pointed out that it would be far simpler for the freeholders in the represented boroughs to vote in the borough where their property was situate instead of being forced to travel to the county polling place; moreover if the borough freeholders were allowed to vote in the counties he felt that the boroughs would have an unfair influence in county elections and the rural element would be submerged by the urban.

... Althorp ... pointed out that until 1832 freeholders in the unrepresented towns always had voted in the counties, so the Tories could hardly complain that the ministers were introducing new principles to favour urban interests ... .

Stooks Smith confirms the number of electors in the polling districts of the West Riding of Yorkshire constituency named after Parliamentary boroughs, at a by-election in 1835 (see below), which suggests up to two-thirds out of a total electorate of 18,063 might have qualified because of freeholds located in boroughs. However it is not known if all these urban area voters were qualified as non-resident freeholders in the boroughs.

The parliamentary boroughs in the area, during the period of the existence of this constituency, were Bradford, Halifax, Huddersfield, Knaresborough, Leeds, Pontefract, Ripon, Sheffield and Wakefield.

For the 1865 general election the West Riding was split into two new two member county divisions by the Birkenhead Enfranchisement Act 1861. Unusually this local redistribution had taken place between the general redistributions of seats, in 1832 and 1868. This was because some seats, taken from Sudbury and St Albans boroughs disenfranchised for corruption, were re-allocated to what (by the developing idea that representation should be related to population) were the still under-represented northern English counties. The new divisions were Northern West Riding of Yorkshire and Southern West Riding of Yorkshire.

== Members of Parliament ==
=== MPs 1654–1658 (Protectorate Parliament) ===
Election	Members					
1654 First Protectorate Parliament	Lord Fairfax	John Lambert	Henry Tempest	John Bright	Edward Gill	Martin Lister
1656 Second Protectorate Parliament	Francis Thorpe	John Lambert	Henry Tempest	Henry Arthington	Edward Gill	John Stanhope

=== MPs 1832–1865 ===
Election	First member	First party	Second member	Second party
1832	Viscount Morpeth	Whig	Sir George Strickland, Bt	Whig
1841	Hon. John Stuart-Wortley	Conservative	Edmund Beckett	Conservative
1846 by-election	Viscount Morpeth	Whig	Edmund Beckett	Conservative
1847	Viscount Morpeth	Whig	Richard Cobden	Radical
1848 by-election	Edmund Beckett	Conservative	Richard Cobden	Radical
1857	Edmund Beckett	Conservative	Viscount Goderich	Whig
March 1859 by-election	Edmund Beckett	Conservative	Sir John Ramsden, Bt	Whig
May 1859	Sir Francis Crossley, Bt	Liberal	Sir John Ramsden, Bt	Liberal
1865	Constituency abolished			

== Elections ==
=== Elections in the 1830s ===
- Constituency created (1832)

General election 1832: West Riding of Yorkshire (2 seats)
Party	Candidate	Votes	%
Whig	George Howard	Unopposed	
Whig	George Strickland	Unopposed	
Registered electors		18,506	
Whig win (new seat)			
Whig win (new seat)			

General election 1835: West Riding of Yorkshire (2 seats)
Party	Candidate	Votes	%
Whig	George Howard	Unopposed	
Whig	George Strickland	Unopposed	
Registered electors		18,061	
Whig hold			
Whig hold			

- Appointment of Howard as Chief Secretary to the Lord Lieutenant of Ireland

By-election, 6 May 1835: West Riding of Yorkshire
Party	Candidate	Votes	%
Whig	George Howard	9,066	59.2
Conservative	John Stuart-Wortley	6,259	40.8
Majority		2,807	18.4
Turnout		15,325	84.9
Registered electors		18,061	
Whig hold			

Breakdown of vote by polling district

Polling District	reg.	Morpeth	Wortley
Barnsley	889	491	281
Bradford	2,504	1,553	616
Dent	161	68	75
Doncaster	1,136	506	447
Halifax	1,691	1,108	331
Huddersfield	1,822	1,072	513
Keighley	499	268	170
Knaresborough	927	285	493
Leeds	2,250	872	979
Pateley Bridge	609	278	263
Settle	802	277	413
Sheffield	1,391	716	455
Skipton	736	417	191
Snaith	630	193	352
Wakefield	2,016	962	680
Total	18,063	9,066	6,259

- Note (1835 be): Discrepancy of 2 in reg. between Craig (result) and Stooks Smith (breakdown).

General election 1837: West Riding of Yorkshire (2 seats)
Party	Candidate	Votes	%
Whig	George Howard	12,576	35.0
Whig	George Strickland	11,892	33.1
Conservative	John Stuart-Wortley	11,489	32.0
Majority		403	1.1
Turnout		23,708	80.8
Registered electors		29,346	
Whig hold			
Whig hold			

=== Elections in the 1840s ===
General election 1841: West Riding of Yorkshire (2 seats)
Party	Candidate	Votes	%	±%
Conservative	John Stuart-Wortley	13,165	26.3	+10.3
Conservative	Edmund Beckett	12,780	25.5	+9.5
Whig	William Wentworth-FitzWilliam	12,080	24.1	−9.0
Whig	George Howard	12,031	24.0	−11.0
Majority		1,134	2.3	N/A
Majority		700	1.4	N/A
Turnout		25,273	81.0	+0.2
Registered electors		31,215		
Conservative gain from Whig		Swing	+10.2	
Conservative gain from Whig		Swing	+9.8	

- Note (1837): 25,273 voted. George Julian Harney and Lawrence Pitkethley were nominated on the Chartist interest, but did not obtain any votes. (Source: Stooks Smith).
- Succession of Stuart-Wortley as 2nd Baron Wharncliffe, 19 December 1845

By-election, 4 February 1846: West Riding of Yorkshire
Party	Candidate	Votes	%	±%
Whig	George Howard	Unopposed		
Whig gain from Conservative				

- Appointment of Howard as First Commissioner of Woods, Forests, Land Revenues, Works, and Buildings

By-election, 18 July 1846: West Riding of Yorkshire
Party	Candidate	Votes	%	±%
Whig	George Howard	Unopposed		
Whig hold				

General election 1847: West Riding of Yorkshire (2 seats)
Party	Candidate	Votes	%	±%
Radical	Richard Cobden	Unopposed		
Whig	George Howard	Unopposed		
Registered electors		36,165		
Radical gain from Conservative				
Whig gain from Conservative				

- Succession of Howard as 7th Earl of Carlisle, 7 October 1848

By-election, 11 December 1848: West Riding of Yorkshire
Party	Candidate	Votes	%	±%
Conservative	Edmund Beckett	14,743	55.6	New
Whig	Culling Eardley	11,795	44.4	N/A
Majority		2,948	11.2	N/A
Turnout		26,538	75.2	N/A
Registered electors		35,280		
Conservative gain from Whig		Swing	N/A	

=== Elections in the 1850s ===
General election 1852: West Riding of Yorkshire (2 seats)
Party	Candidate	Votes	%	±%
Radical	Richard Cobden	Unopposed		
Conservative	Edmund Beckett	Unopposed		
Registered electors		37,319		
Radical hold				
Conservative gain from Whig				

General election 1857: West Riding of Yorkshire (2 seats)
Party	Candidate	Votes	%	±%
Conservative	Edmund Beckett	Unopposed		
Whig	George Robinson	Unopposed		
Registered electors		37,513		
Conservative hold				
Whig gain from Radical				

Robinson succeeded to the peerage, becoming 2nd Earl of Ripon and causing a by-election.

By-election, 21 February 1859: West Riding of Yorkshire
Party	Candidate	Votes	%	±%
Whig	John Ramsden	Unopposed		
Whig hold				

General election 1859: West Riding of Yorkshire (2 seats)
Party	Candidate	Votes	%	±%
Liberal	John Ramsden	15,978	35.5	N/A
Liberal	Francis Crossley	15,401	34.2	N/A
Conservative	James Stuart-Wortley	13,636	30.3	N/A
Majority		1,765	3.9	N/A
Turnout		29,326 (est)	80.0 (est)	N/A
Registered electors		36,645		
Liberal hold		Swing	N/A	
Liberal gain from Conservative		Swing	N/A	

- Constituency abolished 1865
