= Ralph Beckett =

British racehorse trainer

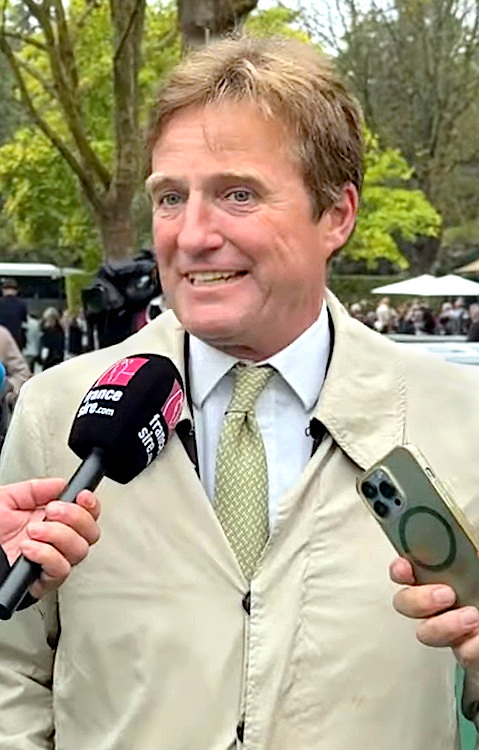
- Beckett at Prix de l'Arc de Triomphe 2024

Personal information
- Born: 24 June 1971 (age 55)
- Occupation: Trainer

Horse racing career
- Sport: Horse racing

Major racing wins
- British Classic Race wins: Epsom Oaks (2); St Leger Stakes; Irish Classic Race win: Irish Derby

Significant horses
- Look Here, Talent, Simple Verse, Angel Bleu, Scope, Westover, Bluestocking

Ralph Michael Beckett (born June 1971) is a British racehorse trainer who specialises in training horses for Flat racing. He is based at Kimpton, Hampshire.

== Career ==
Beckett comes from an aristocratic racing background. He is the grandson of Ralph Beckett, 3rd Baron Grimthorpe, whose horse Fortina won the 1947 Cheltenham Gold Cup, and cousin to racehorse manager Edward Beckett, 5th Baron Grimthorpe. After gaining experience with various trainers around the world, Beckett became assistant trainer to Peter Walwyn in Lambourn. In 2000 he took over the yard after Walwyn's retirement.

Beckett achieved his first Group 1 win in 2008 when Look Here won the Epsom Oaks. Further classic success came with Talent in the 2013 Oaks, Simple Verse in the 2015 St Leger Stakes and Westover in the 2022 Irish Derby.

Beckett was elected president of the National Trainers Federation for 2022/2023.

In 2024, he was the winning trainer of the Prix de l'Arc de Triomphe with Bluestocking.

== Major wins ==
(United Kingdom) Great Britain

- British Champions Fillies and Mares Stakes - (1) - Simple Verse (2015)
- British Champions Sprint Stakes - (1) - Kinross (2022)
- Cheveley Park Stakes - (1) - Lezoo (2022)
- Epsom Oaks - (2) - Look Here (2008), Talent (2013)
- St Leger Stakes - (1) - Simple Verse (2015)
- Falmouth Stakes - (1) - Prosperous Voyage (2022)
- Sussex Stakes - (1) - Qirat (2025)

France

- Critérium International - (1) - Angel Bleu (2021)
- Grand Prix de Saint-Cloud - (1) - Westover (2023)
- Prix de l'Arc de Triomphe - (1) - Bluestocking (2024)
- Prix de la Forêt - (1) - Kinross (2022)
- Prix Jean-Luc Lagardère - (1) - Angel Bleu (2021)
- Prix Royal-Oak - (1) - Scope (2021)
- Prix Vermeille - (1) - Bluestocking (2024)

(Republic of Ireland) Ireland

- Irish Derby - (1) - Westover (2022)
- Irish Oaks - (1) - You Got To Me (2024)
- Pretty Polly Stakes - (1) - Bluestocking (2024)

United States

- Breeders' Cup Turf Sprint - (1) - Starlust (2024)
