= Ralph Beckett, 3rd Baron Grimthorpe =

British banker (1891–1963)

The Right Honourable The Lord Grimthorpe TD DL
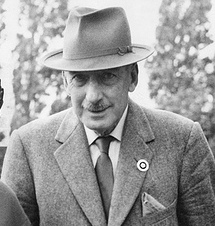

Member of the House of Lords
- Lord Temporal
- as a hereditary peer 9 May 1917 – 22 February 1963
- Preceded by: The 2nd Baron Grimthorpe
- Succeeded by: The 4th Baron Grimthorpe

Personal details
- Born: Ralph William Ernest Beckett; 3 May 1891
- Died: 22 February 1963 (aged 71)
- Political party: Conservative
- Occupation: Banker, soldier, horse owner

Ralph William Ernest Beckett, 3rd Baron Grimthorpe, TD, DL (3 May 1891 – 22 February 1963), was a banker and breeder of racehorses. Beckett was son of Ernest Beckett, 2nd Baron Grimthorpe. He was a partner in the Leeds firm of Beckett & Co., which later became part of the Westminster Bank, and in the aeronautical firm Airspeed Ltd. His racehorses included Fortina, which won the Cheltenham Gold Cup in 1947, and Fragrant Mac, which won the Scottish Grand National in 1952.

== Biography ==
Beckett was educated in 1903 at Eton College. He was a member of Eton's contingent of the Junior Division, Officers Training Corps, and reached the rank of cadet corporal. He went on to study at University College, Oxford.

On 9 May 1917, following the death of his father, Becket inherited the family titles: he became the 3rd Baron Grimthorpe and the 7th Baronet. As a peer, he had an automatic seat in the House of Lords, and first sat in the Lords on 27 February 1919.

On 13 February 1913, Beckett was commissioned as a supernumerary second lieutenant in the Yorkshire Hussars Yeomanry, Territorial Force, British Army. He fought in the First World War, serving in France from 1915 to 1917. He was made an adjutant on 15 January 1917, with the temporary rank of lieutenant. Having been promoted to temporary captain, he relinquished the rank on 21 August 1917 and reverted back to the substantive rank of lieutenant. He vacated the appointment of adjutant on 17 September 1917. He was appointed to an infantry service battalion on 12 September 1917, and he promoted to captain on 16 October 1917. On 16 May 1918, he was given a temporary commission in the Administrative Branch of the Royal Air Force (RAF) as a lieutenant (honorary captain). Having been awarded his pilot wings, he transferred to the Flying Branch, back dated to 6 November 1918. He was a parliamentary private secretary to the Under-Secretary of State for War (Viscount Peel) in 1919. He was demobilised by March 1921.

Beckett maintained his involvement with the military in the interwar period. In 1926, he was confirmed as a major in the Yorkshire Hussars, backdated to 7 May 1924. He was a lieutenant-colonel of the Yorkshire Hussars between 1936 and 1940. Beckett fought in World War II, where he was mentioned in despatches. He held the office of Deputy Lieutenant of the West Riding of Yorkshire.

Beckett frequently took part in the Cresta Run, St Moritz, Switzerland. His interest in aviation included ownership of two light aircraft. As a major investor in Airspeed Ltd, he became chairman of the company. He founded an airline, North Eastern Airways in 1935, using several aircraft produced by Airspeed, until it was grounded by World War II, He was also president of Yorkshire Aero Club.

Lord Grimthorpe died on 22 February 1963, at age 71.

== Family ==
Beckett married, firstly, Mary Alice Archdale, daughter of Colonel Mervyn Henry Archdale and Mary de Bathe, on 3 September 1914. Together, they had two sons and one daughter; his heir, Christopher, was born in 1915. He and Mary were divorced in 1945, and she died in 1962. He married, secondly, Angela Courage, daughter of Edward Hubert Courage and Beatrice Mary Awdry, on 25 March 1945.

== Arms ==
Coat of arms of Ralph Beckett, 3rd Baron Grimthorpe
Crest A boar’s head couped Or pierced by a cross patée fitchée erect Gules. Escutcheon Gules a fess between three boars' heads couped Erminois. Supporters Two sangliers Erminois each gorged with a collar and pendant therefrom an escutcheon Gules charged with a cross patée fitchée Or. Motto Prodesse Civibus (To Serve The State)

Peerage of the United Kingdom
Preceded by Ernest Beckett	Baron Grimthorpe; 1917–1963	Succeeded by Christopher Beckett
Baronetage of the United Kingdom
Preceded by Ernest Beckett	Baronet (of Leeds); 1917–1963	Succeeded by Christopher Beckett
