= Kimpton, Hampshire =

Village and parish in Hampshire, England

Coordinates: 51.219099°N 1.597544°W

Kimpton
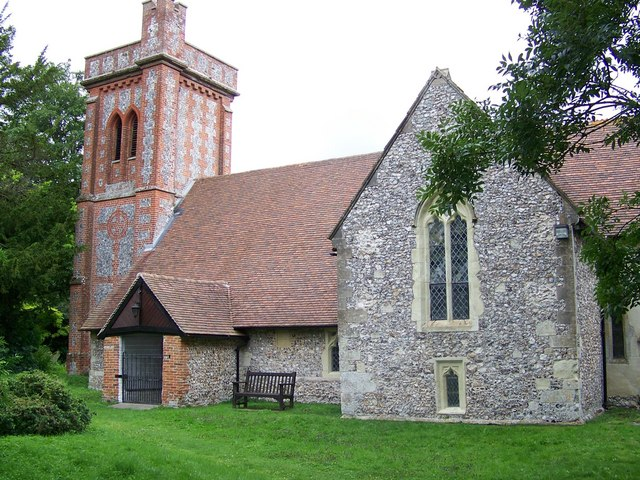
- Church of St Peter and St Paul

- Location within Hampshire
- Population: 337 (2011 Census)
- OS grid reference: SU2820446733
- District: Test Valley
- Shire county: Hampshire
- Region: South East
- Country: England
- Sovereign state: United Kingdom
- Post town: Andover
- Postcode district: SP11
- Dialling code: 01264
- Police: Hampshire and Isle of Wight
- Fire: Hampshire and Isle of Wight
- Ambulance: South Central
- UK Parliament: North West Hampshire

Kimpton is a village and civil parish in the Test Valley district of Hampshire, England. The village is situated west of Andover, in the north of the county, and has a boundary with Ludgershall, in Wiltshire. South of Kimpton there is Thruxton motor racing circuit, in the parish of Thruxton.

The main settlement in the parish is the village of Kimpton, in the south of the parish; in the north there is the hamlet of Shoddesden. In the 2001 census, the parish had a population of 352.

Before the reorganisation of local government in 1974, the parish was in Andover Rural District.

The A342 passes through the north-east corner of the parish. The Midland and South Western Junction Railway, which runs parallel to the road, was closed to passengers in 1961, however the line remains open as far as Ludgershall to serve an army depot on the edge of the town.

Kimpton Down, a rural area in the north and west of the parish, contains the remains of several historical sites including bowl barrows and Roman buildings. Excavations near Shoddesden found a former Iron Age/Romano-British settlement site.

A racehorse training complex at Kimpton Down Stables was opened in 2003 by Toby Balding. Ralph Beckett bought Kimpton Down Stables and gallops in late 2010, and trained Talent to win the 2013 Oaks, Simple Verse to win the 2015 St Leger, and Bluestocking to win the 2024 Prix de L’Arc de Triomphe.

The Grade I listed Church of St Peter & St Paul is situated in the village. The church is built of flint, stone rubble and brick, and has a tower and a cruciform layout. The oldest parts of the church are the nave and chancel, built in the 13th century; other parts were added later. Kimpton Manor, originally built in 1444, is one of the oldest inhabited houses in Hampshire.

The village has a small pub called The Welcome Stranger, Kimpton Apple Press, a park and a village hall which also acts as a pre-school.
