= Fortina =

French-bred Thoroughbred racehorse

- Sire: Formor
- Grandsire: Ksar
- Dam: Bertina
- Damsire: La Farina
- Sex: Stallion
- Foaled: 1941
- Country: France
- Colour: Chestnut
- Owner: Ralph Beckett, 3rd Baron Grimthorpe
- Trainer: Hector Christie

Major wins
- Lancashire Chase (1946); Cheltenham Gold Cup (1947)

Fortina (1941–1968) was a French-bred Thoroughbred racehorse who won the 1947 Cheltenham Gold Cup. He was and remains the only entire horse to win the race. After establishing himself as a top-class steeplechaser in France he was sent to England and won the Gold Cup on his second British start. He was then retired to become a breeding stallion and became a very successful sire of National Hunt horses.

== Background ==
Fortina was a chestnut horse bred in France. He was the best horse sired by Formor, a French bred stallion and a representative of the Byerley Turk sire line. Fortina's dam Bertina was a daughter of the leading French stallion La Farina and a female-line descendant of the influential Hungarian broodmare Kunst.

== Racing career ==
Fortina began his racing career in France. He won four steeplechases and finished second to Lindor as a five-year-old in the 1946 Grand Steeplechase de Paris. In the autumn of 1946 he was bought by Lord Grimthorpe and brought to England to be trained by Hector Christie in Wiltshire and made a successful British debut in the Lancashire Chase.

The winter of 1946/47 was exceptionally severe and many National Hunt fixtures, including the Cheltenham Festival, were either cancelled or postponed. The 20th running of the Cheltenham Gold Cup was eventually staged on 12 April with Fortina starting at odds of 8/1 in a twelve-runner field. The 3/1 favourite was Dorothy Paget's eight-year-old Happy Home whilst the other leading contenders appeared to be Coloured Schoolboy (ridden by Fred Rimell) and Prince Blackthorn. Ridden by the amateur Richard Black, Fortina raced in second place behind Chaka before taking the lead on the second circuit. He quickly went clear and was never in any danger of defeat, winning by ten lengths from Happy Home, with six lengths back to Prince Blackthorn in third.

In the 1947/1948 National Hunt season Fortina was beaten by Silver Fame in the Emblem Chase and then finished unplaced behind Rowland Roy in the King George VI Chase. He was then retired to stud.

== Stud record ==
At the end of his racing career Fortina became a breeding stallion at the Grange Stud at Fermoy, County Cork. He proved to be a very successful National Hunt sire, with his offspring including Fortria, Fort Leney (Cheltenham Gold Cup), Glencaraig Lady (Cheltenham Gold Cup), Brasher (Scottish Grand National), Flying Cottage (Carolina Cup), Olympia (Irish Grand National) Splash (Irish Grand National) and Fort Devon (Maryland Hunt Cup). He was also the only Cheltenham Gold Cup winning horse to sire another Cheltenham Gold Cup winning horse. Died on 13 May 1968

== Assessment and honours ==
In their book, A Century of Champions, based on the Timeform rating system, John Randall and Tony Morris rated Fortina an "average" Gold Cup winner. Fortina's name is remembered in Fortina Close, a residential street in Cheltenham.

== Pedigree ==
Pedigree of Fortina (FR), chestnut stallion, 1941
Sire Formor (FR) 1934	Ksar (FR); 1918	Bruleur	Chouberski
Sire Formor (FR) 1934	Ksar (FR); 1918	Bruleur	Basse Terre
Sire Formor (FR) 1934	Ksar (FR); 1918	Kizil Kourgan	Omnium II
Sire Formor (FR) 1934	Ksar (FR); 1918	Kizil Kourgan	Kasbah
Sire Formor (FR) 1934	Formose (FR); 1923	Clarissimus	Radium
Sire Formor (FR) 1934	Formose (FR); 1923	Clarissimus	Quintessence
Sire Formor (FR) 1934	Formose (FR); 1923	Terre Neuve	Nimbus
Sire Formor (FR) 1934	Formose (FR); 1923	Terre Neuve	Basse Terre
Dam Bertina (FR) 1924	La Farina (FR); 1911	Sans Souci	Le Roi Soleil
Dam Bertina (FR) 1924	La Farina (FR); 1911	Sans Souci	Sanctimony
Dam Bertina (FR) 1924	La Farina (FR); 1911	Malatesta	Isinglass
Dam Bertina (FR) 1924	La Farina (FR); 1911	Malatesta	Parasina
Dam Bertina (FR) 1924	Thea (AUT); 1910	Gouvernant	Flying Fox
Dam Bertina (FR) 1924	Thea (AUT); 1910	Gouvernant	Gouvernante
Dam Bertina (FR) 1924	Thea (AUT); 1910	Theorie	Kisber Ocscse
Dam Bertina (FR) 1924	Thea (AUT); 1910	Theorie	Kunst (Family: 4-e)
