= Sir Edmund Beckett, 4th Baronet =

British politician (1787–1874)

- portrait by Henry William Pickersgill
- Born: 29 January 1787; Gledhow Hall
- Died: 24 May 1874; Doncaster
- Occupation: Politician
- Spouse: Maria Beverley
- Children: 7, including: Edmund Beckett, 1st Baron Grimthorpe; William Beckett; Christopher Beckett Denison
- Father: Sir John Beckett, 1st Bt.

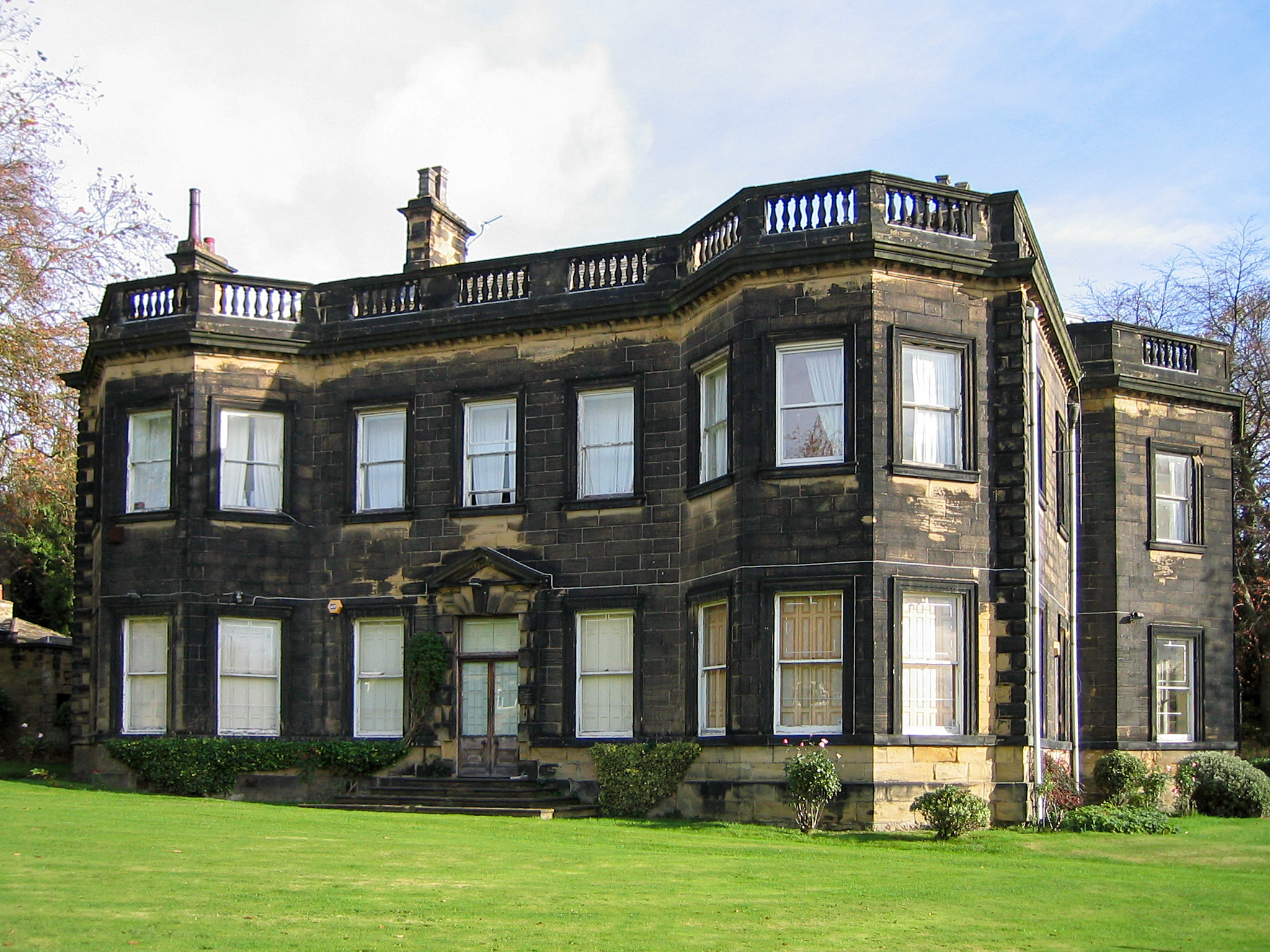
Gledhow Hall

Sir Edmund Beckett-Denison, 4th Baronet (28 January 1787 – 24 May 1874) was a railway promoter and politician.

== Early life ==
Beckett was born at Gledhow Hall, in Leeds, on 29 January 1787. He was a son of banker Sir John Beckett, 1st Baronet (1743–1826), and his wife, Mary, whose father was Christopher Wilson, Bishop of Bristol.

== Career ==
In 1818, Beckett settled in Doncaster, becoming its richest citizen. His wealth came from his share in the Beckett family bank. He became active in municipal and county politics, and in the 1841 general election was elected Tory MP for the West Riding. Having expected an unopposed return in 1847, he withdrew when the Liberals nominated Richard Cobden, but was returned at a by-election in 1848 and sat until 1859. He was close to Sir Robert Peel (he supplied Peel with the horse that threw and fatally injured him); although he voted against the repeal of the Corn Laws in 1846, by 1848 he opposed a return to protection and by 1857 described himself in Dod as a Liberal.

=== Railway career ===
Beckett is known for his role in the development of the railway system. In 1844 there were two railway routes north from London: one (later the Midland Railway) controlled by George Hudson, and the other (later the London and North Western Railway) under Mark Huish. The direct but thinly populated route from London to York was not served. Beckett became chairman of the Great Northern Railway (GNR), which proposed a direct line from London to York via Peterborough and Doncaster, with a loop to serve Lincolnshire. Bitterly fought by Hudson and Huish, because it would take away their traffic, the GNR prospectus was opposed by the railway department of the Board of Trade, and faced a petition alleging that its list of subscribers was inflated. The petition was rejected, and the GNR's private bill was approved in 1846. At over £600,000, this was the most expensive parliamentary contest in British railway history.

Perhaps as a consequence, the line's terminus at King's Cross was to be built "for less than the cost of the ornamental archway at Euston Square", according to Beckett's engineer. Beckett called Hudson a blackguard on Derby station platform in 1845, and featured in a Punch cartoon of the incident. The opening of the GNR defeated Hudson, but not Huish, who built an alliance of lines to try to undercut the GNR. The dispute went to arbitration under W. E. Gladstone, whose rulings mostly favoured Beckett, by awarding the GNR at least as high a proportion of the revenue as it claimed from most of the routes it contested with Huish's confederation. When Beckett retired in 1864 the GNR constituted, as it subsequently remained, the southern end of the fastest route from London to north-east England and Scotland.

== Personal life ==
On 14 December 1814 Beckett married Maria, daughter of William Beverley of Beverley; she was the great-niece and heiress of Anne, daughter of Roundell Smithson, and widow of Sir Thomas Denison, judge of the king's bench. Among their children were:

- Edmund Beckett, 1st Baron Grimthorpe (1816–1905), who married Fanny Catherine (1823–1901), daughter of John Lonsdale, 89th Bishop of Lichfield.
- William Beckett (1826–1890), who married the Hon. Helen Duncombe, daughter of William Duncombe, 2nd Baron Feversham.
- Christopher Beckett Denison (1825–1884), who died unmarried.
- Mary Beckett, who married Charles Wilson Faber and was the mother of Edmund Beckett Faber, 1st Baron Faber.

Through his wife Beckett inherited the estate of Thomas Denison (d. 1765). On 17 November 1872, he inherited the baronetcy of Beckett. He had assumed the additional surname, Denison, by letters patent in 1816, but resumed his original surname by the same process on succeeding to the baronetcy in 1872.

The surviving evidence shows Beckett to be tough and uncompromising. At his death the local Tory paper, in its obituary, described him as "brusque in his manner, impatient to a degree of human vanity in all its ugly shapes, and with little trace of sentiment or poetry of any description".

Beckett died at Doncaster, aged 87, on 24 May 1874, his wife having died on 27 March that year. A funeral service was held on 29 May at Christ Church, Doncaster, after which he was buried there in a family vault. He was succeeded in the baronetcy by his eldest son, Edmund Beckett, 1st Baron Grimthorpe.

Parliament of the United Kingdom
Preceded by Viscount Morpeth; Sir George Strickland, Bt	Member of Parliament for the West Riding of Yorkshire; 1841–1847; With: John Stuart-Wortley-Mackenzie 1841–1846; Viscount Morpeth 1846–1847	Succeeded by Viscount Morpeth; Richard Cobden
Preceded by Viscount Morpeth; Richard Cobden	Member of Parliament for the West Riding of Yorkshire; 1848–1859; With: Richard Cobden 1848–1857; Viscount Goderich 1857–1859; Sir John Ramsden, Bt 1859	Succeeded by Sir John Ramsden, Bt; Sir Francis Crossley, Bt
Baronetage of the United Kingdom
Preceded by Thomas Beckett	Baronet (of Leeds); 1872–1874	Succeeded by Edmund Beckett
