= Royal Lodge Stakes =

Flat horse race in Britain

- Class: Group 2
- Location: Rowley Mile; Newmarket, England
- Inaugurated: 1946
- Race type: Flat / Thoroughbred
- Sponsor: Tattersalls
- Website: Newmarket

Race information
- Distance: 1 mile (1,609 metres)
- Surface: Turf
- Track: Straight
- Qualification: Two-year-old colts and geldings
- Weight: 9 st 2 lb Penalties; 3 lb for G1 / G2 winners
- Purse: £125,000 (2025); 1st: £70,888

Royal Lodge Stakes
2026
Haffner	Burning Up	Quicken Away

Previous years
2025
Bow Echo	Humidity	Action
2024
Wimbledon Hawkeye	Royal Playwright	Angelo Buonarroti
2023
Ghostwriter	Al Musmak	Capulet
2022
The Foxes	Dubai Mile	Flying Honours
2021
Royal Patronage	Coroebus	Unconquerable

2020-2011
2020
New Mandate	Ontario	Cobh
2019
Royal Dornoch	Kameko	Iberia
2018
Mohawk	Sydney Opera House	Cape Of Good Hope
2017
Roaring Lion	Nelson	Mildenberger
2016
Best Of Days	The Anvil	Arcada
2015
Foundation	Deauville	Muntazah
2014
Elm Park	Nafaqa	Salateen
2013
Berkshire	Somewhat	Sir Jack Layden
2012
Steeler	Artigiano	Al Waab
2011
Daddy Long Legs	Tenth Star	Wrote

2010-2001
2010
Frankel	Klammer	Treasure Beach
2009
Joshua Tree	Waseet	Vale Of York
2008
Jukebox Jury	Cityscape	On Our Way
2007
City Leader	Achill Island	Scintillo
2006
Admiralofthefleet	Medicine Path	Kirklees
2005
Leo	Kilworth	Palace Episode
2004
Perfectperformance	Scandinavia	Wilko
2003
Snow Ridge	Moscow Ballet	Rule of Law
2002
Al Jadeed	Industrial Success	Van Nistelrooy
2001
Mutinyonthebounty	Tholjanah	Parasol

2000-1991
2000
Atlantis Prince	Turnberry Isle	Hill Country
1999
Royal Kingdom	Best Of The Bests	Kingsclere
1998
Mutaahab	Glamis	Desaru
1997
Teapot Row	Prolix	City Honours
1996
Benny The Dip	Desert Story	Besiege
1995
Mons	More Royal	Jack Jennings
1994
Eltish	Stiletto Blade	Juyush
1993
Mister Baileys	Concordial	Overbury
1992
Desert Secret	Geisway	Lost Soldier
1991
Made Of Gold	Mack The Knife	Twist And Turn

1990-1988
1990
Mujaazif	Jahafil	Stone Mill
1989
Digression	Bridal Toast	Air Music
1988
High Estate	Samoan	Frequent Flyer

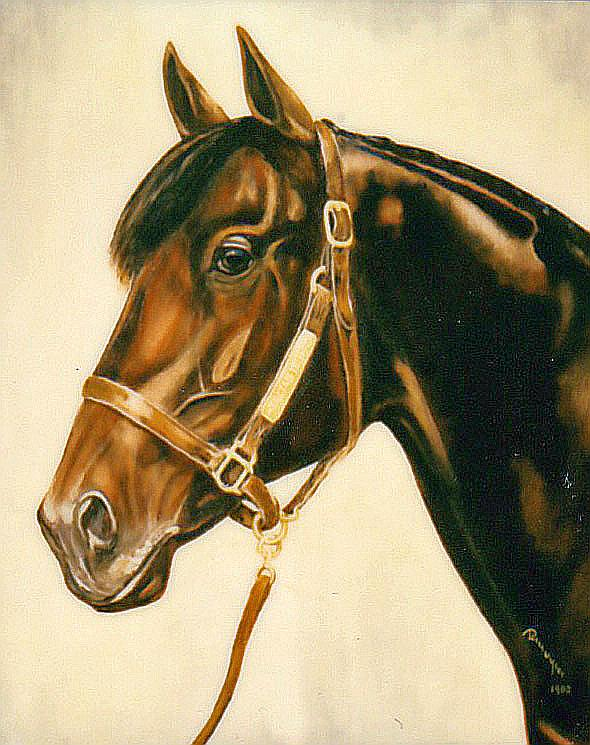
Shirley Heights, by Bob Demuyser (1920-2003)

The Royal Lodge Stakes is a Group 2 flat horse race in Great Britain open to two-year-old colts and geldings. It is run on the Rowley Mile at Newmarket over a distance of 1 mile (1,609 metres), and it is scheduled to take place each year in late September.

== History ==
The event was established in 1946, and it was originally held at Ascot. It is named after Royal Lodge, a royal residence located in Windsor Great Park. It was initially contested over 5 furlongs and open to horses of either gender. It was extended to a mile in 1948, and restricted to colts and geldings in 1987.

The race was first staged at Newmarket in 2005, when Ascot was closed for redevelopment. It was transferred more permanently in 2011.

The Royal Lodge Stakes is sometimes included in the Breeders' Cup Challenge series, with the winner earning an automatic invitation to compete in the Breeders' Cup Juvenile Turf. Its latest period of inclusion began in 2012.

The race is currently held on the final day of Newmarket's three-day Cambridgeshire Meeting, the same day as the Cambridgeshire Handicap.

== Records ==
Leading jockey (8 wins):

- Lester Piggott – Pinched (1957), St Paddy (1959), Casabianca (1963), Soft Angels (1965), Royal Palace (1966), Remand (1967), Sir Wimborne (1975), Dunbeath (1982)

Leading trainer (8 wins):

- Noel Murless – Pinched (1957), St Paddy (1959), Casabianca (1963), Soft Angels (1965), Royal Palace (1966), Domineering (1969), Yaroslav (1971), Adios (1972)

== Winners ==
Year	Winner	Jockey	Trainer	Time
1946	Royal Barge	Cliff Richards	Joseph Lawson	1:04.80
1947	Black Tarquin	Harry Carr	Cecil Boyd-Rochfort	1:03.40
1948	Swallow Tail	Doug Smith	Walter Earl	1:46.60
1949	Tabriz	Sir Gordon Richards	Frank Butters	1:47.00
1950	Fraise du Bois II	Charlie Smirke	Harry Wragg	1:51.60
1951	Khr-Mousa	Ken Gethin	Peter Thrale	1:51.40
1952	Neemah	Charlie Smirke	Marcus March	1:48.60
1953	Infatuation	Sir Gordon Richards	Victor Smyth	1:49.20
1954	Solarium	Willie Snaith	Sam Armstrong	1:54.80
1955	Royal Splendour	Scobie Breasley	Walter Nightingall	1:51.06
1956	Noble Venture	Manny Mercer	Harry Wragg	1:53.96
1957	Pinched	Lester Piggott	Noel Murless	1:48.62
1958	Cantelo	Eddie Hide	Charles Elsey	1:49.49
1959	St Paddy	Lester Piggott	Noel Murless	1:46.14
1960	Beta	Eddie Larkin	Jack Jarvis	1:45.80
1961	Escort	Joe Mercer	Jack Colling	1:46.90
1962	Star Moss	Eph Smith	John Waugh	1:51.10
1963 (Note: The 1963 running was held at Newbury Racecourse)	Casabianca	Lester Piggott	Noel Murless	1:46.20
1964	Prominer	Garnie Bougoure	Paddy Prendergast	1:44.75
1965	Soft Angels	Lester Piggott	Noel Murless	1:51.79
1966	Royal Palace	Lester Piggott	Noel Murless	1:43.97
1967	Remand	Lester Piggott	Dick Hern	1:48.05
1968	Dutch Bells	Tony Murray	Ryan Price	1:59.18
1969	Domineering	Sandy Barclay	Noel Murless	1:43.70
1970	Seafriend	Joe Mercer	Paddy Prendergast	1:44.34
1971	Yaroslav	Geoff Lewis	Noel Murless	1:44.74
1972	Adios	Geoff Lewis	Noel Murless	1:42.62
1973	Straight As A Die	Frankie Durr	Barry Hills	1:48.42
1974	Abandoned due to waterlogging
1975	Sir Wimborne	Lester Piggott	Vincent O'Brien	1:47.29
1976	Gairloch	Brian Taylor	Ryan Price	1:46.02
1977	Shirley Heights	Greville Starkey	John Dunlop	1:43.36
1978	Ela-Mana-Mou	Greville Starkey	Guy Harwood	1:41.91
1979	Hello Gorgeous	Joe Mercer	Henry Cecil	1:43.54
1980	Robellino	John Matthias	Ian Balding	1:41.83
1981	Norwick	Joe Mercer	Guy Harwood	1:46.64
1982	Dunbeath	Lester Piggott	Henry Cecil	1:46.00
1983	Gold and Ivory	Steve Cauthen	Ian Balding	1:41.64
1984	Reach	Richard Quinn	Paul Cole	1:43.51
1985	Bonhomie	Steve Cauthen	Henry Cecil	1:40.98
1986	Bengal Fire	Michael Roberts	Clive Brittain	1:43.92
1987	Sanquirico	Steve Cauthen	Henry Cecil	1:41.66
1988	High Estate	Michael Roberts	Henry Cecil	1:44.31
1989	Digression	Pat Eddery	Guy Harwood	1:42.20
1990	Mujaazif	Walter Swinburn	Michael Stoute	1:41.53
1991	Made of Gold	Tony Cruz	Mohammed Moubarak	1:46.66
1992	Desert Secret	Pat Eddery	Michael Stoute	1:47.72
1993	Mister Baileys	Frankie Dettori	Mark Johnston	1:45.14
1994	Eltish	Pat Eddery	Henry Cecil	1:43.64
1995	Mons	Frankie Dettori	Luca Cumani	1:42.74
1996	Benny the Dip	Walter Swinburn	John Gosden	1:43.67
1997	Teapot Row	Seb Sanders	James Toller	1:41.74
1998	Mutaahab	Richard Hills	Ed Dunlop	1:45.04
1999	Royal Kingdom	Michael Kinane	Aidan O'Brien	1:50.06
2000	Atlantis Prince	Frankie Dettori	Sean Woods	1:46.32
2001	Mutinyonthebounty	Jamie Spencer	Aidan O'Brien	1:45.86
2002	Al Jadeed	Richard Hills	John Gosden	1:42.21
2003	Snow Ridge	Martin Dwyer	Marcus Tregoning	1:41.19
2004	Perfectperformance	Frankie Dettori	Saeed bin Suroor	1:41.89
2005	Leo	Jimmy Fortune	John Gosden	1:37.72
2006	Admiralofthefleet	Michael Kinane	Aidan O'Brien	1:41.06
2007	City Leader	Kevin Darley	Brian Meehan	1:43.64
2008	Jukebox Jury	Royston Ffrench	Mark Johnston	1:40.59
2009	Joshua Tree	Colm O'Donoghue	Aidan O'Brien	1:39.55
2010	Frankel	Tom Queally	Henry Cecil	1:41.73
2011	Daddy Long Legs	Colm O'Donoghue	Aidan O'Brien	1:37.77
2012	Steeler	Kieren Fallon	Mark Johnston	1:35.67
2013	Berkshire	Jim Crowley	Paul Cole	1:39.97
2014	Elm Park	Andrea Atzeni	Andrew Balding	1:37.10
2015	Foundation	Frankie Dettori	John Gosden	1:38.04
2016	Best Of Days	James Doyle	Hugo Palmer	1:38.98
2017	Roaring Lion	Oisin Murphy	John Gosden	1:39.56
2018	Mohawk	Donnacha O'Brien	Aidan O'Brien	1:36.12
2019	Royal Dornoch	Wayne Lordan	Aidan O'Brien	1:35.13
2020	New Mandate	Frankie Dettori	Ralph Beckett	1:37.86
2021	Royal Patronage	Jason Hart	Mark Johnston	1:38.06
2022	The Foxes	David Probert	Andrew Balding	1:43.66
2023	Ghostwriter	Richard Kingscote	Clive Cox	1:37.06
2024	Wimbledon Hawkeye	James Doyle	James Owen	1:38.38
2025	Bow Echo	Billy Loughnane	George Boughey	1:36.95
2026	Haffner	Ryan Moore	Aidan O'Brien	1:35.44

== See also ==
- Horse racing in Great Britain
- List of British flat horse races
- Road to the Kentucky Derby
