= Spring Cup (horse race) =

Flat horse race in Britain

Spring Cup
2026
Hilitany	Bella Lyra	Ten Carat Harry

Previous years
2025
Rebel's Gamble	Rajeko	Bountiful
2024
Watch My Tracer	Queen Of Zafeen	Orne
2023
Iconic Moment	New Definition	Tenjin
2022
El Caballo	Witch Hunter	Anthem National
2021
Apollo One	Megallan	El Drama

2020-2011
2020
Malotru	Raaeb	The Perfect Crown
2019
Fanaar	Deep Intrigue	You Never Can Tell
2018
Headway	Rufus King	Lake Volta
2017
Second Thought	Sutter County	Volatile
2016
Haalick	Tutu Nguru	Jaadu
2015
Lexington Times	Angelic Lord	Fanciful Angel
2014
Ertijaal	American Hope	Major Crispies
2013
Teophilip	Emell	Hoarding
2012
Gusto	Kenny Powers	Bannock
2011
Dubawi Gold	Elshabakiya	Vanguard Dream

2010-2003
2010
Classic Colori	Greyfriarschorista	Stargaze
2009
Nashmiah	Elnawin	Smokey Ryder
2008
Paco Boy	Tasdeer	Geezers Colours
2007
Hinton Admiral	Hurricane Spirit	Evens And Odds
2006
Kingsgate Prince	Saabiq	Rising Cross
2005
Party Boss	Francis Cadell	Tremar
2004
Rosencrans	Fokine	Bahiano
2003
Membership	Our Teddy	Fiddlers Reach

The Spring Cup is a Listed flat horse race in Great Britain open to horses aged three years only. It is run at Lingfield over a distance of 7 furlongs and 1 yard (1,409 metres), and it is scheduled to take place each year in late February or early March.

The race was first run in 2003, and was awarded Listed status in 2004.

== Records ==
Leading jockey (3 wins):

- Richard Hughes – Party Boss (2005), Paco Boy (2008), Lexington Times (2015)

Leading trainer (4 wins):

- William Haggas - Ertijaal (2014), Second Thought (2017), Headway (2018), Fanaar (2019)

== Winners ==
Year	Winner	Jockey	Trainer	Time
2003	Membership	Frankie Dettori	Clive Brittain	1:23.93
2004	Rosencrans	Frankie Dettori	Saeed bin Suroor	1:23.64
2005	Party Boss	Richard Hughes	Clive Brittain	1:25.03
2006	Kingsgate Prince (Note: Kingsgate Prince was later exported to Hong Kong and renamed Sunny King)	Richard Quinn	John Best	1:24.10
2007	Hinton Admiral	Jean-Pierre Guillambert	Mark Johnston	1:23.21
2008	Paco Boy	Richard Hughes	Richard Hannon Sr.	1:25.00
2009	Nashmiah	Jamie Spencer	Clive Brittain	1:23.68
2010	Classic Colori	Richard Kingscote	Tom Dascombe	1:23.54
2011	Dubawi Gold	Jimmy Fortune	Richard Hannon Sr.	1:23.74
2012	Gusto	Ryan Moore	Richard Hannon Sr.	1:23.93
2013	Teophilip	Andrea Atzeni	Marco Botti	1:23.28
2014	Ertijaal	Paul Hanagan	William Haggas	1:22.72
2015	Lexington Times	Richard Hughes	Richard Hannon Jr.	1:24.69
2016	Haalick	Jack Mitchell	Roger Varian	1:22.28
2017	Second Thought	Robert Winston	William Haggas	1:22.10
2018	Headway	James Doyle	William Haggas	1:24.07
2019	Fanaar	Jim Crowley	William Haggas	1:23.44
2020	Malotru	Andrea Atzeni	Marco Botti	1:22.75
2021	Apollo One	Martin Harley	Peter Charalambous	1:24.47
2022	El Caballo	Sam James	Karl Burke	1:22.76
2023	Iconic Moment	Rossa Ryan	James Tate	1:23.16
2024	Watch My Tracer	Callum Shepherd	George Scott	1:24.66
2025	Rebel's Gamble	Clifford Lee	Karl Burke	1:23.92
2026	Hilitany	Billy Loughnane	George Boughey	1:24.66

== See also ==
- Horse racing in Great Britain
- List of British flat horse races
