= Wild Flower Stakes =

Flat horse racing in Britain

- Class: Listed
- Location: Kempton Park, Sunbury, England
- Race type: Flat / Thoroughbred
- Sponsor: Unibet
- Website: Kempton Park

Race information
- Distance: 1m 3f 219y (2,413 metres)
- Surface: Polytrack
- Track: Right-handed
- Qualification: Three-years-old and up
- Weight: 9 st 4 lb (3yo); 9 st 8 lb (4yo+); Allowances; 5 lb for fillies and mares Penalties; 7 lb for Group 1 or Group 2 winners * 5 lb for Group 3 winners * 3 lb for Listed winners* * after 31 March 2025
- Purse: £50,000 (2025); 1st: £28,355

Wild Flower Stakes
2025
Shader	Dubai Honour	Ancient Wisdom

Previous years
2024
Champagne Prince	Eydon	Fantasy Believer
2023
Rebel's Romance	Elegant Man	Base Note
2022
Belloccio	Purple Ribbon	Siskany
2021
Garden Paradise	Siskany	Tartlette

2020-2011
2020
Johnny Drama	Sinjaari	Sextant
2019
Pablo Escobarr	Loxley	Hameem
2018
Spark Plug	Verdana Blue	Time Shanakill
2017
Red Verdon	Master The World	Daphne
2016
Crimean Tatar	Chemical Charge	Curbyourenthusiasm
2015
Fire Fighting	Hamelin	Headline News
2014
Livia's Dream	Grendisar	Billabong
2013
Aussie Reigns	Dick Doughtywylie	Banoffee
2012
Media Hype	Roxy Flyer	Harris Tweed
2011
Barbican	Ceilidh House	Bolivia

2010-2007
2010
Cheetah	Nideeb	Status Symbol
2009
Les Fazzani	Mooakada	Saphira's Fire
2008
Dansant	Les Fazzani	Tropical Strait
2007
Dansant	Pivotal Answer	Invasian

The Wild Flower Stakes is a Listed flat horse race in Great Britain open to horses aged three years or older. It is run at Kempton Park over a distance of 1 mile 3 furlongs and 219 yards (2,413 metres), and it is scheduled to take place each year in December.

The race was first run in 2007.

== Records ==
Most successful horse (2 wins):

- Dansant – 2007, 2008

Leading jockey (2 wins):

- Eddie Ahern – Dansant (2007, 2008)
- Tom Marquand - Spark Plug (2018), Pablo Escobarr (2019)
- Jamie Spencer - Les Fazzani (2009), Belloccio (2022)
- William Buick - Rebel's Romance (2023), Champagne Prince (2024)

Leading trainer (2 wins):

- Gerard Butler - Dansant (2007, 2008)

== Winners ==
Year	Winner	Age	Jockey	Trainer	Time
2007	Dansant	3	Eddie Ahern	Gerard Butler	2:31.03
2008	Dansant	4	Eddie Ahern	Gerard Butler	2:32.95
2009	Les Fazzani	5	Jamie Spencer	Kevin Ryan	2:30.72
2010	Cheetah	3	Kirsty Milczarek	Luca Cumani	2:29.93
2011	Barbican	3	Ryan Moore	Alan Bailey	2:30.00
2012	Media Hype	5	Martin Harley	Elaine Burke	2:32.02
2013	Aussie Reigns	3	Andrea Atzeni	William Knight	2:32.79
2014	Livia's Dream	5	Luke Morris	Ed Walker	2:34.43
2015	Fire Fighting	4	Adam Kirby	Mark Johnston	2:33.01
2016	Crimean Tatar	3	Jack Mitchell	Hugo Palmer	2:32.57
2017	Red Verdon	4	P. J. McDonald	Ed Dunlop	2:29.67
2018	Spark Plug	7	Tom Marquand	Brian Meehan	2:32.07
2019	Pablo Escobarr	3	Tom Marquand	William Haggas	2:29.99
2020	Johnny Drama	5	Silvestre de Sousa	Andrew Balding	2:32.50
2021	Garden Paradise	4	Rossa Ryan	James Tate	2:33.39
2022	Belloccio	4	Jamie Spencer	David Menuisier	2:30.83
2023	Rebel's Romance	5	William Buick	Charlie Appleby	2:31.99
2024	Champagne Prince	3	William Buick	Jane Chapple-Hyam	2:32.43
2025	Shader	4	Colin Keane	John & Thady Gosden	2:32.57

== See also ==
- Horse racing in Great Britain
- List of British flat horse races
