= Glorious Stakes =

Flat horse race in Britain

- Class: Group 3
- Location: Goodwood Racecourse; W. Sussex, England
- Inaugurated: 1979
- Race type: Flat / Thoroughbred
- Sponsor: Coral
- Website: Goodwood

Race information
- Distance: 1m 3f 218y (2,412 metres)
- Surface: Turf
- Track: Right-handed
- Qualification: Four-years-old and up
- Weight: 9 st 3 lb Allowances; 3 lb for fillies and mares Penalties; 7 lb for Group 1 winners * 5 lb for Group 2 winners * 3 lb for Group 3 winners * * after 2018
- Purse: £100,000 (2025); 1st: £56,710

Glorious Stakes
2026
Enfjaar	Opportunity	Al Aasy

Previous years
2025
Al Aasy	Meydaan	Candleford
2024
Al Aasy	Relentless Voyager	Phantom Flight
2023
Hamish	Jack Darcy	Candleford
2022
Rebel's Romance	Kemari	Fancy Man
2021
Passion And Glory	Euchen Glen	Fox Tal

2020-2011
2020
Pablo Escobarr	Desert Encounter	Le Don De Vie
2019
Desert Encounter	Mirage Dancer	Baghdad
2018
Mirage Dancer	Red Verdon	Second Step
2017
Poet's Word	Second Step	Scarlet Dragon
2016
Kings Fete	Ayrad	Majeed
2015
Dubday	The Corsican	Windshear
2014
Pether's Moon	Encke	Cafe Society
2013
Forgotten Voice	Lost In The Moment	Sheikhzayedroad
2012
Quest For Peace	Dandino	Gatewood
2011
Drunken Sailor	Harris Tweed	Jukebox Jury

2010-2001
2010
Redwood	Sri Putra	Traffic Guard
2009
Illustrious Blue	Warringah	Halicarnassus
2008
Sixties Icon	Galactic Star	Lion Sands
2007
Purple Moon	Imperial Star	Stotsfold
2006
Crosspeace	Foxhaven	Admiral's Cruise
2005
Mamool	Dubai Success	Jagger
2004
Alkaased	First Charter	Alkaadhem
2003
Researched	Razkalla	Darasim
2002
Darasim	The Whistling Teal	Murghem
2001
Compton Bolter	Maniatis	Delius

2000-1991
2000
Murghem	Lightning Arrow	Ligne Gagnante
1999
Danish Rhapsody	Mardani	Muhib
1998
Sabadilla	Yavana's Pace	Ridaiyma
1997
Bahamian Sunshine	Bright Water	Humourless
1996
Salmon Ladder	Midnight Legend	Better Offer
1995
Midnight Legend	Ionio	Source Of Light
1994
Duke Of Eurolink	Quick Ransom	Ballet Prince
1993
Usaidit	Muhayaa	Source Of Light
1992
Spinning	Jahafil	Surrealist
1991
Fly Away Soon	Magnificent Star	Finance Dancer

1990-1988
1990
Hajade	Spinning	Hateel
1989
Knoosh	Relief Pitcher	Konigsberg
1988
Maksud	Highbrow	Fridu

The Glorious Stakes is a Group 3 flat horse race in Great Britain open to horses aged four years or older. It is run at Goodwood over a distance of 1 mile 3 furlongs and 218 yards (2,412 metres), and it is scheduled to take place each year in late July or early August.

== History ==
The event was established in 1979, and it was initially called the Alycidon Stakes. It was named after Alycidon, a successful racehorse whose victories included the Goodwood Cup in 1949. It was originally a conditions race for horses aged three or older, and it was given Listed status in 1985.

The title of the race was changed to the Alycidon Glorious Stakes in 1987, and it became known as the Glorious Stakes in 1989. The minimum age of participating horses was raised to four in 1993, and from this point it was run as a limited handicap. It reverted to being a conditions race in 2004, and it was promoted to Group 3 level in 2008.

The Glorious Stakes is currently held on the last day of the five-day Glorious Goodwood meeting.

== Records ==
Most successful horse (2 wins):

- Capstan – 1981, 1982
- Al Aasy - 2024, 2025

Leading jockey (4 wins):

- Willie Carson – Water Mill (1980), Capstan (1981, 1982), Seymour Hicks (1983)

Leading trainer (7 wins):

- Luca Cumani – Knockando (1987), Hajade (1990), Midnight Legend (1995), Alkaased (2004), Purple Moon (2007), Drunken Sailor (2011), Quest for Peace (2012)

== Winners ==
Year	Winner	Age	Jockey	Trainer	Time
1979	Bohemian Grove	3	Tony Murray	Adrian Maxwell	2:41.17
1980	Water Mill	3	Willie Carson	Dick Hern	2:35.20
1981	Capstan	3	Willie Carson	Dick Hern	2:34.35
1982	Capstan	4	Willie Carson	Dick Hern	2:32.73
1983	Seymour Hicks	3	Willie Carson	John Dunlop	2:35.61
1984	Longboat	3	Brian Rouse	Dick Hern	2:34.78
1985	Shernazar	4	Walter Swinburn	Michael Stoute	2:42.79
1986	Nisnas	3	Richard Quinn	Paul Cole	2:36.22
1987	Knockando	3	Ray Cochrane	Luca Cumani	2:33.11
1988	Maksud	3	Michael Roberts	Robert Armstrong	2:40.04
1989	Knoosh	3	Pat Eddery	Michael Stoute	2:35.62
1990	Hajade	3	Frankie Dettori	Luca Cumani	2:31.84
1991	Fly Away Soon	3	Richard Quinn	Paul Cole	2:38.31
1992	Spinning	5	Ray Cochrane	Ian Balding	2:34.66
1993	Usaidit	4	John Reid	Terry Mills	2:42.30
1994	Duke of Eurolink	5	Pat Eddery	John Dunlop	2:35.13
1995	Midnight Legend	4	Frankie Dettori	Luca Cumani	2:33.81
1996	Salmon Ladder	4	Richard Quinn	Paul Cole	2:33.65
1997	Bahamian Sunshine	6	Jason Weaver	Reg Akehurst	2:35.16
1998	Sabadilla	4	Frankie Dettori	John Gosden	2:36.24
1999	Danish Rhapsody	6	Gary Stevens	Lady Herries	2:34.24
2000	Murghem	5	Darryll Holland	Mark Johnston	2:35.22
2001	Compton Bolter	4	Kevin Darley	Gerard Butler	2:36.05
2002	Darasim	4	Kevin Darley	Mark Johnston	2:36.09
2003	Researched	4	Kieren Fallon	Sir Michael Stoute	2:38.25
2004	Alkaased	4	Jimmy Fortune	Luca Cumani	2:34.40
2005	Mamool	6	Kerrin McEvoy	Saeed bin Suroor	2:39.96
2006	Crosspeace	4	Royston Ffrench	Mark Johnston	2:36.64
2007	Purple Moon	4	Jamie Spencer	Luca Cumani	2:35.08
2008	Sixties Icon	5	Johnny Murtagh	Jeremy Noseda	2:37.07
2009	Illustrious Blue	6	Jim Crowley	William Knight	2:37.22
2010	Redwood	4	Michael Hills	Barry Hills	2:33.86
2011	Drunken Sailor	6	Kieren Fallon	Luca Cumani	2:34.79
2012	Quest for Peace	4	Kieren Fallon	Luca Cumani	2:42.53
2013	Forgotten Voice	8	Johnny Murtagh	Nicky Henderson	2:36.95
2014	Pether's Moon	4	Richard Hughes	Richard Hannon Jr.	2:35.63
2015	Dubday	5	Frankie Dettori	Jassim Al Ghazali	2:34.03
2016	Kings Fete	5	Ryan Moore	Sir Michael Stoute	2:36.45
2017	Poet's Word	4	Ryan Moore	Sir Michael Stoute	2:42.60
2018	Mirage Dancer	4	Ryan Moore	Sir Michael Stoute	2:33.69
2019	Desert Encounter	7	Jamie Spencer	David Simcock	2:34.75
2020	Pablo Escobarr	4	Tom Marquand	William Haggas	2:37.72
2021	Passion And Glory	5	Oisin Murphy	Saeed bin Suroor	2:41.61
2022	Rebel's Romance	4	William Buick	Charlie Appleby	2:34.89
2023	Hamish	7	Tom Marquand	William Haggas	2:41.74
2024	Al Aasy	7	Jim Crowley	William Haggas	2:38.17
2025	Al Aasy	8	Jim Crowley	William Haggas	2:37.54
2026	Enfjaar	6	Ray Dawson	Roger Varian	2:35.00

== See also ==
- Horse racing in Great Britain
- List of British flat horse races
- Recurring sporting events established in 1979 – this race is included under its original title, Alycidon Stakes.
