= Jukebox Jury =

Jukebox Jury may refer to:

- Juke Box Jury, a British panel show
- Jukebox Jury (horse), a racehorse
- Jukebox Jury (TV series), an American television series
