= Matsunosuke =

British-bred Thoroughbred racehorse

Matsunosuke (foaled 25 February 2002) is a racehorse owned and trained by A B Coogan in Soham, Cambridgeshire.

== Famous Living Racehorse ==
Matsunosuke is a flat racing racehorse in the UK who has won in class 1 listed company and competed in Group 1, 2, and 3 races. Rated as the best horse on the all-weather of all time by the Racing Post, and 112 by the BHB, making him one of the best horses ever to run on the artificial surface. He was also the number-1-ranked sprinter during the all-weather season 2008-09. He is known for a hold-up style and incredible final furlong burst of speed which he can complete in less than 10.5 seconds ('Racing Post').

== Pedigree ==
The sire to Matsunosuke is Magic Ring (born 11 February 1989), an Irish horse which won 3 times on flat ground over 5 furlongs. 2 of his wins came in Group 3 races and all of his wins came when ridden by Alan Munro who has also ridden Matsunosuke. He was owned by H R H Prince Fahd Salman and trained by P F I Cole. His last race was 22 May 1993. He had a best Racing Post Rating of 119.

The dam for Matsunosuke is Lon Isa (born 21 February 1991, died 2005), which ran 17 times over Flat ground and over hurdles. Despite not winning, Lon Isa placed 5 times and earned £3,795 prize money. She was owned by H Weeks and trained by B Palling. She had a best racing post rating of 85.

== Foaling ==
Matsunosuke was foaled on 25 February 2002 in Soham, Cambridgeshire and was bred by Ryan Coogan, who is the son of the trainer Alan 'Scobie' Coogan, a former successful jumps jockey.

== 2004 - 2006 ==
=== 2004 ===
Matsunosuke had his debut on 23 September 2004 in the European Breeders Fund Poppin Lane Maiden Stakes at Pontefract, where he fell around halfway through the 6 furlong class 4 race. He also brought down Baileys Honour when he fell. His starting odds were 66/1 and he was ridden by Dean McKeown. His last ride of 2004 was in October, when he came 10th in a class 4 maiden stakes at Newmarket.

=== 2005 ===
In 2005, he started his first full flat racing season with a win at Catterick on 6 April in the class 5 Toytop Maiden Stakes over 6 furlongs at 20/1, one of only 2 wins over 6 furlongs for him. He was ridden by Tony Culhane. He rode 10 more times in 2005 in handicap races under 8 different jockeys, including future joint-champion jockey Seb Sanders. During this period he won once more in the 5 furlong, class 5 Flyers Handicap at Sandown on 11 August under Seb Sanders. He was 16/1.

=== 2006 ===
He ran another 12 times in 2006, winning on his second appearance of the season on 6 May in a 5-furlong, class 4 handicap at Thirsk. He won at 6/1 and was ridden by apprentice jockey Luke Morris, who has now become the most successful jockey to ride Matsunosuke in terms of prize money and placings. He won once more in 2006 on 13 July at Newmarket in a class 4 handicap over 5 furlongs. He was ridden by Darryll Holland and won at odds of 16/1. Incidentally, the horse that came second on both occasions was Handsome Cross.

He also ran in a Heritage Handicap at Ascot on 20 July 2006 which was the biggest race by far in terms of stature and prize money he had entered up until that point. However, luck was not on his side as he unseated rider Luke Morris after clipping the heels of Lafi. The fact that he took part in the race, however, shows how far he had come and the aspirations of the team behind him and possibly what was to come.

== 2007 - 2008 ==
=== 2007 ===
Matsunosuke ran 19 times in 2007, all in the summer flat season. However, the season didn't start so well for him and he didn't place in any of his first 8 starts, although he did qualify for, and run in, a group 2 race at Ascot in June. He also went down to his lowest official handicap mark in the summer of 2007, but this did allow him to turn the corner and get his first win of the season in a 5 furlong class 4 handicap at Sandown Park on 15 August, where he was ridden by Jimmy Fortune who had ridden him the week before also. Jimmy Fortune would ride him one more time that season, gaining a 2nd place in a class 5 handicap 2 races later. This was definitely a turning point, however, and came just before he became acquainted with jockey Kerrin McEvoy who rode him in 4 of his final 5 races of the year, gaining 2 wins, a 3rd place and a 4th place. He ended the year rated 96, having touched a career high rating of 97. He also got one of his wins carrying a handicap weight of 9-10, a career high for him that stood all the way until the beginning of 2009.

=== 2008 ===
Matsunosuke started 2008 with a very good 2nd in a class 1 listed race at Lingfield on 15 March. Despite coming a very respectable 4th in his next outing at Newmarket in the Group 3 Stan James Palace House Stakes on 4 May, he didn't place for his next 10 races over the following 2 months. The main reason for this is because he had achieved an official handicap rating so high, touching 100 at one point, that it was difficult to find suitable handicap races for him and he had to run several group races which he found very difficult.

His next placing was a 3rd at Great Leighs, an all-weather circuit, on 13 September. He was ridden for the first time by French jockey Louis-Philippe Beuzelin and it was followed up by another 3rd place at the same track 2 weeks later. He did run twice more on turf at Bath and Newmarket, but those all-weather track performances had helped bring about a change in tactics and he started his attack on the 2008-09 all-weather flat season.

This would be the first time Matsunosuke had run during the winter months and despite finishing October with a 7th place at Great Leighs, he followed it with a 4th, two 3rd's and two 2nd's on all-weather tracks before getting his first win of the all-weather season at Great Leighs in a 6 furlong, class 3 handicap on 21 December 2008. He finished the calendar year with a 3rd place but his assault on the all-weather season was only just getting started.

== 2009 ==
=== January - March ===
2009 began with a poor result at Southwell on 1 January on what was a slow track, coming last in a class 2 handicap. However he won 4 out of his next 6 rides, including 3 wins in a row, to put him as the top rated all-weather horse in the UK and also top of the prize money leaderboard the 2nd of his hat-trick of wins came with him having 9 stone 13 pounds on board (a personal best). However another 2 bad results at the end of the all-weather flat winter season saw him finish second to Scintillo in terms of prize money. In terms of rating he finished the all-weather winter season with an official rating of 112 (another personal best) which made him 2nd overall, but his Racing Post Rating (a reliable industry indicator) was 117 and that was the best of the season. These figures make him one of the best all-weather horses of all time, in what was a very competitive season.

=== April onwards ===
After such a rewarding all-weather season, Matsunosuke started his turf season ridden by Luke Morris at Newmarket on 16 April in a Class 1 Listed Stakes at the Craven Meeting. The going was Good-Firm and the trip was 6 furlongs but Matsunosuke looked tired and came 9th at 25/1. It was, however, a strong race with Tax Free coming 1st (and later going on to win a Group 2 in May). He then came 12th out of 16 runners under Jimmy Fortune (breaking Luke Morris' 7 race / 4 month racing streak on the horse) in the Group 3 Palace House Stakes over his preferred 5 furlong Good-Firm trip, a race he came 4th in the previous year. Luke Morris was in the saddle for another poor run 1 month later at Lingfield on the All-Weather track over 6 furlongs. 1 Month later, he got his first-place finish since his win on 21 February 6 races ago at Lingfield on the all-weather track (and first top 3 finish on grass for over a year). This result came in a class 2 handicap at Windsor on his favoured good-firm ground over 6 furlongs. His official rating at this point had gone below 100 (99) for the first time since January 2009 and was at 98 for his next race which saw him come 4th in the Group 3 King George Stakes at Goodwood over 5 furlongs. A week later at Ascot on 11 July however saw him finish 7 of 9 runners in a class 2 handicap over 5 furlongs with Royston Ffrench as jockey for the first time on Matsunosuke (The last 3 races having had Luke Morris on board). His rating for the race was back at 104 and despite high-profile wins on the all-weather, he has never won on turf with a rating of more than 75, and that was during his last win on Turf which was in September 2007.

The rest of the 2009 turf season fruitless, the next 2 races with Luke Morris (a 5-furlong and a 6-furlong affair at Goodwood and Ripon respectively.

=== Retirement ===
Matsunosuke retired in 2012 to Hawthorn Farm at the foot of the South Downs near Chichester. He currently enjoys his time in the paddocks there, along with Scissor Ridge, who was the first winner in England for the current Champion Jockey Richard Hughes.

== Riding style ==
Matsunosuke has often had problems with big fields due to his 'hold-up' riding style, remaining near the rear of the field until the last furlong or two where he will sometimes sprint past the other horses. He is one of the quickest final furlong sprinters of all time, yet not all jockeys have been able to ride him with balance and finesse. Luke Morris is the most successful jockey with Matsunosuke in terms of both finishes and prize money, having ridden him more than any other jockey. Kerrin McEvoy has the next best success rate, and has ridden him the second most number of times. In total, Matsunosuke has been ridden by 24 different jockeys, although Luke Morris and Kerrin McEvoy have accounted for over a third of all his rides.

He is thought to favour Good-Firm ground and his most successful trip has been over five furlongs.

== Bibliography ==
- The Racing Post

=== References ===
1. https://www.racingpost.com/profile/horse/605379/matsunosuke

2. https://www.racingpost.com/profile/horse/88979/lon-isa

3. https://www.racingpost.com/profile/horse/65947/magic-ring
