= Charlie Wood Stakes =

Flat horse race in Britain

Charlie Wood Stakes
2024
King Of Conquest	Aimeric	Deauville Legend

Previous years
2023
Kemari	Outbox	New London
2022
Rebel's Romance	Kemari	Stowell
2021
Outbox	Logician	Pablo Escobarr

2020-2011
2020
Universal Order	El Misk	Pablo Escobarr
2019
Wells Farhh Go	Walton Street	Barsanti
2018
Second Step	Dylan Mouth	Crimson Rosette
2017
Lord Yeats	Second Step	Mount Logan
2016
Bateel	Kallisha	John Reel
2015
Gospel Choir	Dubday	Gatewood
2014
Sheikhzayedroad	Gatewood	Chancery
2013
Lost In The Moment	I'm Your Man	Harris Tweed
2012
Polygon	Dandino	Barbican
2011
Jukebox Jury	Afsare	Cavalryman

2010-2001
2010
Laaheb	Whispering Gallery	Man Of Iron
2009
All The Aces	Wasan	Classic Punch
2008
Lion Sands	Tranquil Tiger	Red Gala
2007
Classic Punch	Hard Top	Munsef
2006
Admiral's Cruise	Ouninpohja	Amwell Brave
2005
Imperial Stride	Albinus	Gulf
2004
First Charter	Westmoreland Road	Island House
2003
Razkalla	Putra Sandhurst	First Charter
2002
Xtra	Ovambo	Alunissage
2001
Mubtaker	Courteous	Lear Spear

2000-1991
2000
Murghem	Double Eclipse	Maylane
1999
Blueprint	Yavana's Pace	Memorise
1998
Tamure	Taufan's Melody	Multicoloured
1997
Kutta	Harbour Dues	Anno Luce
1996
Bequeath	Commoner	Dance A Dream
1995
Saxon Maid	Magical Retreat	Waiting
1994
River North	Mack The Knife	Shambo
1993
Bobzao	Lupescu	Sonus
1992
Jahafil	Shambo	Tetradonna
1991
Mukddaam	Tiger Flower	Sesame

1990-1988
1990
Alphabel	My Lamb	By Charter
1989
Apache	Emmson	Per Quod
1988
Merce Cunningham	Arden	Ocean Ballad

The Charlie Wood Stakes is a Listed flat horse race in Great Britain open to thoroughbreds aged four years or older. It was run as the Fred Archer Stakes on the July Course at Newmarket over a distance of 1 mile 4 furlongs (2,413 metres). Now, it is scheduled to take place each year in early July at Beverley (the first time it being run there being 2025) as the Charlie Wood Stakes.

== Winners since 1987 ==
Year	Winner	Age	Jockey	Trainer	Time
1987	Sharp Noble	5	Geoff Baxter	Stan Mellor	2:42.58
1988	Merce Cunningham	4	Willie Carson	Neil Graham	2:30.52
1989	Apache	4	Michael Roberts	Chris Thornton	2:29.61
1990	Alphabel	4	Michael Roberts	Alec Stewart	2:35.72
1991	Mukddaam	4	Willie Carson	Dick Hern	2:34.90
1992	Jahafil	4	Willie Carson	Dick Hern	2:30.84
1993	Bobzao	4	John Reid	Terry Mills	2:30.72
1994	River North	4	Kevin Darley	Lady Herries	2:33.36
1995	Saxon Maid	4	Frankie Dettori	Luca Cumani	2:34.38
1996	Bequeath	4	Pat Eddery	Henry Cecil	2:28.93
1997	Kutta	5	Richard Hills	Robert Armstrong	2:34.20
1998	Tamure	6	Kieren Fallon	Luca Cumani	2:30.64
1999	Blueprint	4	Frankie Dettori	Michael Stoute	2:32.42
2000	Murghem	5	Richard Hills	Mark Johnston	2:30.14
2001	Mubtaker	4	Richard Hills	Marcus Tregoning	2:27.58
2002	Xtra	4	Richard Hughes	Luca Cumani	2:27.34
2003	Razkalla	5	Frankie Dettori	David Loder	2:29.05
2004	First Charter	5	Kieren Fallon	Sir Michael Stoute	2:32.59
2005	Imperial Stride	4	Richard Hills	Sir Michael Stoute	2:30.09
2006	Admiral's Cruise	4	Jimmy Fortune	Brian Meehan	2:30.70
2007	Classic Punch	4	Richard Quinn	David Elsworth	2:35.74
2008	Lion Sands	4	Richard Hughes	Luca Cumani	2:27.73
2009	All The Aces	4	Michael Hills	Michael Jarvis	2:30.95
2010	Laaheb	4	Richard Hills	Michael Jarvis	2:30.82
2011	Jukebox Jury	5	Neil Callan	Mark Johnston	2:33.35
2012	Polygon	4	William Buick	John Gosden	2:30.01
2013	Lost In The Moment	6	Mickael Barzalona	Saeed bin Suroor	2:28.93
2014	Sheikhzayedroad	5	Martin Lane	David Simcock	2:36.75
2015	Gospel Choir	6	Ryan Moore	Sir Michael Stoute	2:29.90
2016	Bateel	4	William Buick	David Simcock	2:43.18
2017	Lord Yeats	4	P. J. McDonald	Jedd O'Keeffe	2:31.65
2018	Second Step	7	Andrea Atzeni	Roger Charlton	2:35.82
2019	Wells Farhh Go	4	David Allan	Tim Easterby	2:32.17
2020 (Note: The 2020 race was run on Newmarket's Rowley Mile course due to the COVID-19 pandemic in the United Kingdom)	Universal Order	4	Callum Shepherd	David Simcock	2:32.66
2021	Outbox	6	Hollie Doyle	Archie Watson	2:30.01
2022	Rebel's Romance	4	William Buick	Charlie Appleby	2:35.75
2023	Kemari	5	James Doyle	Charlie Appleby	2:32.68
2024	King of Conquest	5	William Buick	Charlie Appleby	2:27.83
2025	Candleford	7	Cieren Fallon	William Haggas	2:35.24
2026	Al Aasy	9	Cieren Fallon	William Haggas	2:37.85

== See also ==
- Horse racing in Great Britain
- List of British flat horse races
