= Bow Echo (horse) =

Irish racehorse

- Racing Silks of Sheikh Mohammed Obaid Al Maktoum
- Breed: Thoroughbred
- Sire: Night of Thunder
- Grandsire: Dubawi
- Dam: Aristocratic Lady
- Damsire: Invincible Spirit
- Sex: Colt
- Foaled: 1 March 2023 (age 3)
- Country: IRE
- Breeder: Sheikh Mohammed Obaid Al Maktoum
- Owner: Executors of the late Sheikh Mohammed Obaid
- Trainer: George Boughey
- Jockey: Billy Loughnane
- Record: 6 : 6-0-0
- Earnings: £1,650,645

Major wins
- Royal Lodge Stakes (2025); 2,000 Guineas (2026); St James's Palace Stakes (2026); Sussex Stakes (2026)

Awards
- Cartier Champion Three-year-old Colt (2026); Timeform rating: 133

Bow Echo (foaled 1 March 2023) is a retired thoroughbred racehorse bred in Ireland and trained by George Boughey in Great Britain. In 2025, Bow Echo won all three of his starts, including the Royal Lodge Stakes, a Group 2 race. The following season, he achieved the Group 1 treble of the 2,000 Guineas, St James's Palace Stakes, and Sussex Stakes, all over one mile, before being retired due to injury. He was ridden in all his races by Billy Loughnane.

== Background ==
Bow Echo is a bay colt bred in Ireland by Sheikh Mohammed Obaid Al Maktoum of Dubai. His sire Night of Thunder won the 2014 2000 Guineas; his dam Aristocratic Lady won three races. He went into training with George Boughey at Craven House Stables on Hamilton Road in Newmarket, with Jordan McMurray as his groom and work rider. Sheikh Mohammed Obaid died in December 2025 and Bow Echo's ownership passed to his executors.

== Racing career ==
=== 2025: two-year-old season ===
Bow Echo made his racing debut in a Maiden Stakes over a mile at Newbury on 15 August 2025. Ridden by Billy Loughnane, he won by 4 1/2 lengths. He was then stepped up in class to contest the Ascendant Stakes, a Listed race at Haydock Park on 9 September, and won by a length. After the race his trainer said: "He has plenty of pace, he's a Guineas horse and that's what we'll be training him for".

For his third and final race of the season, Bow Echo was entered in the Group 2 Royal Lodge Stakes on the Rowley Mile course at Newmarket on 27 September. He raced in midfield before going into the lead one furlong out and winning by a length.

=== 2026: three-year-old season ===
In 2026, Bow Echo began his three-year-old season in the 2,000 Guineas on 5 May on the Rowley Mile at Newmarket. In a field of fourteen, he started at 9/2, third favourite, behind joint favourites Gstaad, trained by Aidan O'Brien, and Distant Storm, trained by Appleby. Loughnane held him up towards the rear of the field before moving forward two furlongs out and taking the lead a furlong out. He won 2 3/4 lengths from Gstaad, with Distant Storm a further eight lengths back in third place. It was a first Classic victory for his jockey, and only the second for his trainer.

Boughey decided to keep racing Bow Echo over a mile, rather than entering him for the Derby. His next race was the Group 1 St James's Palace Stakes at Royal Ascot. He started as the odds-on favourite in a field of six, with Gstaad, who in the meantime had won the Irish 2,000 Guineas, as second favourite. Bow Echo was hampered at the start by Gstaad and then raced behind the leaders before coming out wide on the home turn. He went into the lead and just held off Gstaad who came up on his inside in the final furlong, winning by a short head in a photo finish.

On 29 July 2026, Bow Echo ran in the Group 1 Sussex Stakes over a mile at Goodwood, competing for the first time against older horses. He started as 10/11 favourite in a field of twelve, which included Gstaad. Having tracked Gstaad in the early stages of the race, Bow Echo found himself boxed in when Gstaad made his run. He found a gap but then hit a flat spot before making up ground and passing Gstaad in the final strides of the race to win by 1/2 a length. The victory gave him a treble that had last been achieved by Frankel in 2011. After the race, Boughey said: "He really showed all of his attributes today. He's a star, he's got an amazing mind, and he looks the complete racehorse at the moment." He added that the plan was to enter Bow Echo in the Prix Jacques le Marois or the Prix du Moulin in France before going to the US for the Breeders' Cup. On 11 August, Boughey announced that Bow Echo had suffered an injury while training and was being retired from racing. He said:

"It is with great disappointment that we have to announce that Bow Echo has had a setback and will be retired from racing. It has been the honour of a lifetime to train a horse like Bow Echo. He has given us some extraordinary days and taken everyone involved on a journey we will never forget. To retire unbeaten, having won the 2000 Guineas, St James's Palace Stakes and Sussex Stakes says everything about what an exceptional racehorse he has been. Bow Echo's remarkable story began with his owner-breeder, the late Sheikh Mohammed Obaid and it is a great sadness that he was not here to see what a lifetime of breeding was able to produce. Bow Echo's unbelievable constitution and extraordinary ability have set him apart. We will all miss seeing him at home and on the racecourse but we are incredibly excited for his next chapter and in time, to see a new generation of his progeny on the racecourse."

== Racing statistics ==
Date	Distance (Going)	Race	Class	Course	Field	Finish	Time (Note: Official time of winning horse.)	Winning (Losing) Margin	Jockey	Winner (2nd place)
2025 – two-year-old season
15 Aug	1 mile (Good)	Maiden		Newbury	7	1st	1m 37.85s	4 1/2 lengths	Billy Loughnane	(Be The Standard)
06 Sep	1 mile 37 yards (Good)	Ascendant Stakes	Listed	Haydock	7	1st	1m 40.22s	1 length	Billy Loughnane	(Publish)
27 Sep	1 mile (Good to Firm)	Royal Lodge Stakes	G2	Newmarket	8	1st	1m 36.95s	1 length	Billy Loughnane	(Humidity)
2026 – three-year-old season
02 May	1 mile (Good to Firm)	2000 Guineas Stakes	G1	Newmarket	14	1st	1m 35.59s	2 3/4 lengths	Billy Loughnane	(Gstaad)
16 Jun	7 furlongs 213 yards (Good to Firm)	St James's Palace Stakes	G1	Ascot	6	1st	1m 38.48s	short head	Billy Loughnane	(Gstaad)
29 Jul	1 mile (Good to Firm )	Sussex Stakes	G1	Goodwood	12	1st	1m 36.03s	1/2 lengths	Billy Loughnane	(Gstaad)

== Pedigree ==
Pedigree of Bow Echo
Sire Night of Thunder (IRE) 2011	Dubawi (IRE); 2002	Dubai Millenium (GB)	Seeking The Gold
Sire Night of Thunder (IRE) 2011	Dubawi (IRE); 2002	Dubai Millenium (GB)	Colorado Dancer
Sire Night of Thunder (IRE) 2011	Dubawi (IRE); 2002	Zomaradah (IRE)	Deploy
Sire Night of Thunder (IRE) 2011	Dubawi (IRE); 2002	Zomaradah (IRE)	Jawaher
Sire Night of Thunder (IRE) 2011	Forest Storm (GB); 2006	Galileo (IRE)	Sadler's Wells
Sire Night of Thunder (IRE) 2011	Forest Storm (GB); 2006	Galileo (IRE)	Urban Sea
Sire Night of Thunder (IRE) 2011	Forest Storm (GB); 2006	Quiet Storm (IRE)	Desert Prince
Sire Night of Thunder (IRE) 2011	Forest Storm (GB); 2006	Quiet Storm (IRE)	Hertford Castle
Dam Aristocratic Lady (IRE) 2016	Invicible Spirit (IRE); 1997	Green Desert (USA)	Danzig
Dam Aristocratic Lady (IRE) 2016	Invicible Spirit (IRE); 1997	Green Desert (USA)	Foreign Courier
Dam Aristocratic Lady (IRE) 2016	Invicible Spirit (IRE); 1997	Rafha (GB)	Kris
Dam Aristocratic Lady (IRE) 2016	Invicible Spirit (IRE); 1997	Rafha (GB)	Eljazzi
Dam Aristocratic Lady (IRE) 2016	Dubai Queen (USA); 2008	Kingmambo (USA)	Mr. Prospector
Dam Aristocratic Lady (IRE) 2016	Dubai Queen (USA); 2008	Kingmambo (USA)	Miesque
Dam Aristocratic Lady (IRE) 2016	Dubai Queen (USA); 2008	Zomaradah (IRE)	Deploy
Dam Aristocratic Lady (IRE) 2016	Dubai Queen (USA); 2008	Zomaradah (IRE)	Jawaher
