= Cachet (horse) =

Irish Thoroughbred racehorse

- Sire: Aclaim
- Grandsire: Acclamation
- Dam: Poyle Sophie
- Damsire: Teofilo
- Sex: Filly
- Foaled: 21 March 2019
- Country: Ireland
- Colour: Bay
- Breeder: Hyde Park Stud
- Owner: Highclere T'Bred Racing - Wild Flower
- Trainer: George Boughey
- Record: 12: 3-2-3
- Earnings: £559,971

Major wins
- Nell Gwyn Stakes (2022); 1000 Guineas (2022)

Cachet (foaled 21 March 2019) is an Irish-bred, British-trained Thoroughbred racehorse. As a two-year-old in 2021 she won only one minor race but showed promising form as she finished second in the Rockfel Stakes, third in the Fillies' Mile and third in the Breeders' Cup Juvenile Fillies Turf. In the following spring she improved to win the Nell Gwyn Stakes and the 1000 Guineas.

== Background ==
Cachet is a bay filly with a white star and three white socks bred in Ireland by the County Westmeath-based Hyde Park Stud. In September 2020 the yearling was consigned to the Tattersalls Ascot sale but failed to reach her reserve price of 14,000 guineas. In the following April she returned to the Tattersalls sales ring for the Craven Breeze-up sale (in which two-year-olds are publicly galloped before being auctioned) and was bought for 60,000 guineas by the Highclere Agency. She entered the ownership of the Highclere T'Bred Racing - Wild Flower syndicate and was sent into training with George Boughey at the Saffron House Stables in Newmarket, Suffolk.

She was from the first crop of foals sired by Aclaim, who recorded his biggest win when he took the 2017 Prix de la Foret on his final racecourse appearance. Cachet's dam Poyle Sophie showed little racing ability, managing to record one second-place finish from six starts. As a descendant of the broodmare Grand Peace, was distantly related to Sagaro, Blue Point and Donjuan Triumphant.

== Racing career ==
=== 2021: two-year-old season ===
Cachet began her track career in a novice race (for two-year-olds with no more than two previous wins) over six furlongs on good ground on the Rowley course at Newmarket Racecourse on 15 May when she was ridden by Nicola Currie and started at odds of 4/1 in a seven-runner field. She was in contention from the start, took the lead a furlong out, and drew away in the closing stages to win "readily" by five and a half lengths.

Although she failed to win again in 2021, Cachet ran consistently well against high-class opposition. In June she came home fifth in the Group 3 Albany Stakes at Royal Ascot and then ran third when favourite for the Listed Empress Stakes at Newmarket. In the following month she finished third at Ascot behind the colts New Science and Angel Bleu in the Pat Eddery Stakes. She was then sent to France in September and finished seventh in the Prix d'Aumale but produced a much better effort later in the month when she ran second to Hello You in the Group 2 Rockfel Stakes at Ascot. She was then stepped up to the highest class for the Fillies' Mile at Newmarket and finished third behind Inspiral and Prosperous Voyage. For her final run of the season she was sent to the United States and finished fourth in the Breeders' Cup Juvenile Fillies Turf at Del Mar on 5 November.

=== 2022: three-year-old season ===
On her first appearance as a three-year-old Cachet contested the Nell Gwyn Stakes (a trial race for the 1000 Guineas) over seven furlongs at Newmarket on 12 April. Ridden by William Buick she was made the 15/8 favourite, with the best fancied of her seven opponents being her old rival Hello You. Cachet tracked the front-running Flash Betty before taking the lead three furlongs out and "kept on well" in the last quarter mile to win by two and a half lengths from the 28/1 outsider Almohandesah. After the race George Boughey said "I kept saying at the back end of last year that she was slightly weak and she did incredibly well over the winter... She’s obviously a high-class filly and we’ll come back here for the Guineas and give it a good go. The mile is the question mark, but she loves the track here which is a huge string to her bow. All systems go for the Guineas with this filly.”

On 1 May Cachet, with James Doyle in the saddle, started a 16/1 outsider in a thirteen-runner field for the 209th running of the 1000 Guineas over the Rowley Mile. Tenebrism started favourite while the other runners included Hello You, Prosperous Voyage, Sandrine, Discoveries, Tuesday, Wild Beauty (Natalma Stakes) and Zellie (Prix Marcel Boussac). In a change of tactics, Cachet took the lead from the start and was never headed, staying on well under pressure and holding off a strong late challenge from Prosperous Voyage to win by a neck. Doyle, who had won the 2000 Guineas on Coroebus a day earlier said "We knew she kind of wears her heart on her sleeve and knows this track inside out, so I felt as long as we could get those cheap sectionals midway I could be brave and let her use her stride into the Dip. She goes through it so well that it’s almost like she eyes it up from a way out and she really let rip through it, so it was just a case of hoping she’d hang on to the line.” Boughey commented "The question was always going to be whether she stayed. She’s got a really big heart and she’s very straightforward. She’s a Group One winner over a mile now and she can go anywhere in the world, which is massive. The fact that she likes fast ground makes her a global filly which is huge for us and huge for her so it’s very exciting."

Two weeks after winning the 1000 Guineas, Cachet attempted to follow up in the French equivalent, the Poule d'Essai des Pouliches over 1600 metres at Longchamp Racecourse. She again set the pace but was overtaken 400 metres from the finish and despite rallying in the closing stages she was beaten into second place by Mangoustine, beaten a head by the winner. In the Coronation Stakes at Royal Ascot in June she started the 6/1 second favourite but after putting up her customary front-running effort she faded from contention after being overtaken a furlong out and came home fifth behind Inspiral.

== Pedigree ==
Pedigree of Cachet (IRE), bay filly, 2019
Sire Aclaim (IRE) 2013	Acclamation (GB); 1999	Royal Applause	Waajib (IRE)
Sire Aclaim (IRE) 2013	Acclamation (GB); 1999	Royal Applause	Flying Melody (IRE)
Sire Aclaim (IRE) 2013	Acclamation (GB); 1999	Princess Athena (IRE)	Ahonoora (GB)
Sire Aclaim (IRE) 2013	Acclamation (GB); 1999	Princess Athena (IRE)	Shopping Wise
Sire Aclaim (IRE) 2013	Aris (IRE); 2008	Danroad (AUS)	Danehill (USA)
Sire Aclaim (IRE) 2013	Aris (IRE); 2008	Danroad (AUS)	Strawberry Girl (USA)
Sire Aclaim (IRE) 2013	Aris (IRE); 2008	Cumbres (FR)	Kahyasi (IRE)
Sire Aclaim (IRE) 2013	Aris (IRE); 2008	Cumbres (FR)	Floripedes
Dam Poyle Sophie (GB) 2011	Teofilo (IRE); 2004	Galileo	Sadler's Wells (USA)
Dam Poyle Sophie (GB) 2011	Teofilo (IRE); 2004	Galileo	Urban Sea (USA)
Dam Poyle Sophie (GB) 2011	Teofilo (IRE); 2004	Speirbhean	Danehill (USA)
Dam Poyle Sophie (GB) 2011	Teofilo (IRE); 2004	Speirbhean	Saviour (USA)
Dam Poyle Sophie (GB) 2011	Lost in Lucca (GB); 1996	Inchinor	Ahonoora
Dam Poyle Sophie (GB) 2011	Lost in Lucca (GB); 1996	Inchinor	Inchmurrin (IRE)
Dam Poyle Sophie (GB) 2011	Lost in Lucca (GB); 1996	Poyle Fizz	Damister (USA)
Dam Poyle Sophie (GB) 2011	Lost in Lucca (GB); 1996	Poyle Fizz	Tribal Feast (Family: 4-l)

- Cachet is inbred 4 × 4 to Ahonoora and Danehill, meaning that both these stallions appear twice in the fourth generation of his pedigree.
