= Kachy Stakes =

Flat horse race in Britain

- Class: Listed
- Location: Lingfield Park; Lingfield, England
- Race type: Flat / Thoroughbred
- Sponsor: BetUK
- Website: Lingfield Park

Race information
- Distance: 6f 1y (1,208 metres)
- Surface: Polytrack
- Track: Straight
- Qualification: Four-years-old and up
- Weight: 9 st 2 lb Allowances 5 lb for fillies Penalties; 3 lb for Listed winners* 5 lb for Group 3 winners* 7 lb for Group 1 or 2 winners * after 31 August 2023
- Purse: £50,000 (2024); 1st: £28,355

Cleves Stakes
2026
Diligent Harry	Completely Random	Cool Hoof Luke

Previous years
2025
Marshman	Mitbaahy	Annaf
2024
Diligent Harry	Annaf	Willem Twee
2023
Annaf	Diligent Harry	Exalted Angel
2022
Spycatcher	Lord Of The Lodge	Good Effort
2021
Exalted Angel	Fizzy Feet	Misty Grey

2020-2011
2020
Good Effort	Soldier's Minute	Lady Dancealot
2019
Kachy	Gorgeous Noora	Stone Of Destiny
2018
Kachy	Kimberella	Caspian Prince
2017
Lancelot Du Lac	Mythmaker	Boom The Groom
2016
Rivellino	Gamgoom	Cold As Ice
2015
Rivellino	Glen Moss	Hallelujah
2014
Tarooq	Rivellino	Hoof It
2013
Ladies Are Forever	Farmleigh House	Fratellino
2012
Oasis Dancer	Fratellino	Capone
2011
Waveband	Anne Of Kiev	Duff

2010-2007
2010
Jaconet	Green Manalishi	Mullionmileanhour
2009
Matsunosuke	Duff	Orpsie Boy
2008
Excusez Moi	Ceremonial Jade	Bonus
2007
King Orchisios	Woodnook	Qadar

The Kachy Stakes is a Listed flat horse race in Great Britain open to horses aged four years or older. It is run at Lingfield Park over a distance of 6 furlongs and 1 yard (1,208 metres), and it is scheduled to take place each year in February.

The race was first run in 2007 as the Cleves Stakes. It was renamed from the 2021 running to honour Kachy, the winner of the race in 2018 and 2019. He broke the Lingfield Park track record in his 2019 win but suffered a fatal injury when running at the course in 2020.

== Records ==
Most successful horse (2 wins):

- Rivellino - 2015, 2016
- Kachy - 2018, 2019

Leading jockey (3 wins):

- Clifford Lee - Exalted Angel (2021), Spycatcher (2022), Marshman (2025)

Leading trainer (5 wins):

- Karl Burke - Rivellino (2015, 2016), Exalted Angel (2021), Spycatcher (2022), Marshman (2025)

== Winners ==
Year	Winner	Age	Jockey	Trainer	Time
2007	King Orchisios	4	Neil Callan	Kevin Ryan	1:10.52
2008	Excusez Moi	6	Liam Jones	Clive Brittain	1:09.61
2009	Matsunosuke	7	Luke Morris	Alan Coogan	1:10.07
2010	Jaconet	5	Phillip Makin	David Barron	1:10.12
2011	Waveband	4	Martin Dwyer	David Barron	1:10.74
2012	Oasis Dancer	5	Jim Crowley	Ralph Beckett	1:10.21
2013	Ladies Are Forever	5	Willie Twiston-Davies	Geoff Oldroyd	1:10.98
2014	Tarooq	8	Graham Gibbons	David Barron	1:08.94
2015	Rivellino	5	Daniel Tudhope	Karl Burke	1:11.21
2016	Rivellino	6	Dougie Costello	Karl Burke	1:10.64
2017	Lancelot Du Lac	7	Robert Winston	Dean Ivory	1:10.12
2018	Kachy	5	Richard Kingscote	Tom Dascombe	1:09.13
2019	Kachy	6	Richard Kingscote	Tom Dascombe	1:08.32
2020	Good Effort	5	Ben Curtis	Ismail Mohammed	1:09.28
2021	Exalted Angel	5	Clifford Lee	Karl Burke	1:10.09
2022	Spycatcher	4	Clifford Lee	Karl Burke	1:08.70
2023	Annaf	4	Rossa Ryan	Michael Appleby	1:09.72
2024	Diligent Harry	6	Ryan Moore	Clive Cox	1:08.75
2025	Marshman	5	Clifford Lee	Karl Burke	1:10.18
2026 (dh)	Completely Random; Diligent Harry	5; 8	Ryan Moore; Rossa Ryan	Harry Charlton; Clive Cox	1:09.20

== See also ==
- Horse racing in Great Britain
- List of British flat horse races
