= Rebel's Romance =

Irish-bred Thoroughbred racehorse

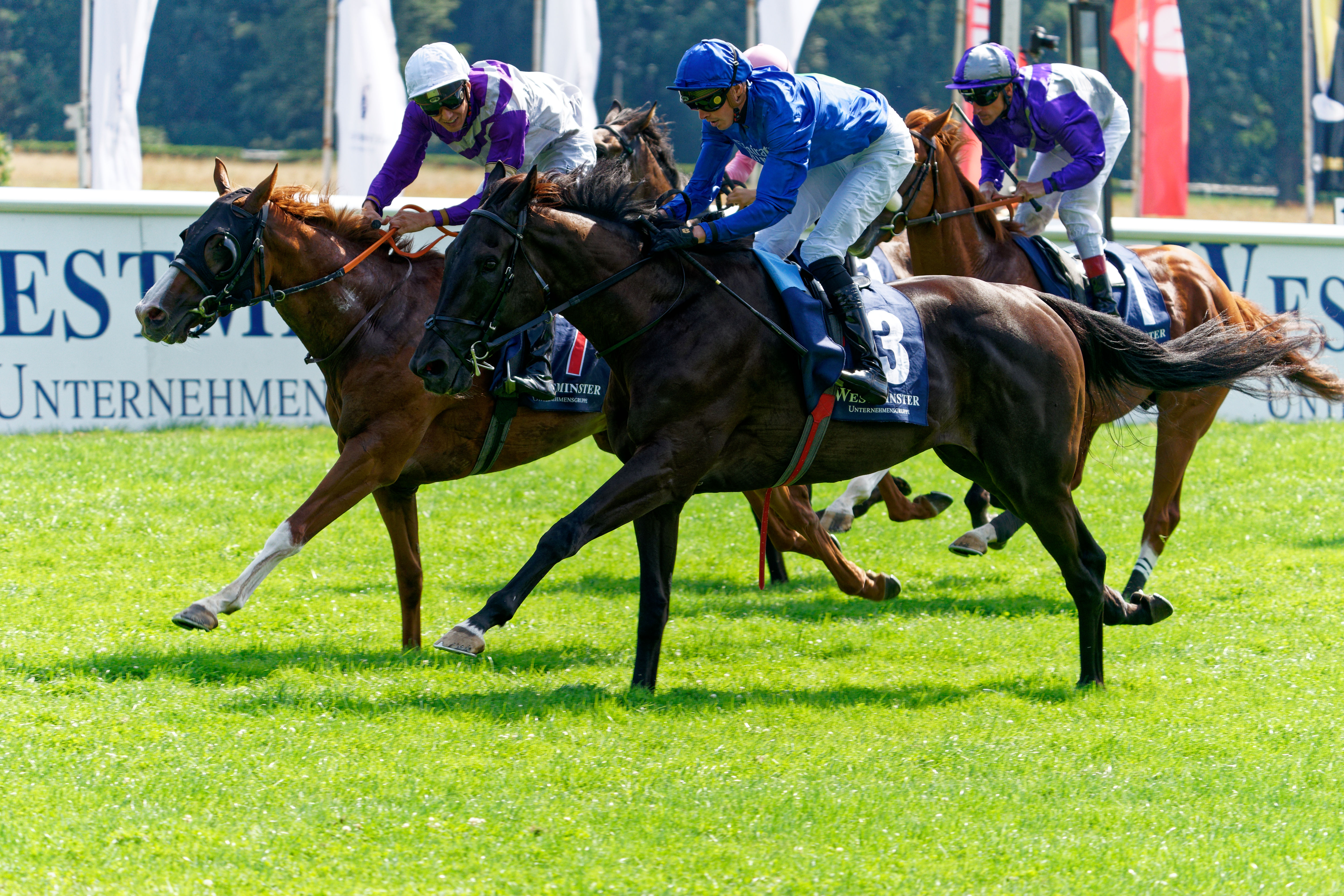
- Rebel's Romance at the 2022 Grosser Preis von Berlin
- Sire: Dubawi (IRE)
- Grandsire: Dubai Millennium (GB)
- Dam: Minidress (GB)
- Damsire: Street Cry (IRE)
- Sex: Gelding
- Foaled: 19 March 2018
- Country: Ireland
- Colour: Brown
- Breeder: Godolphin
- Owner: Godolphin
- Trainer: Charlie Appleby
- Record: 32: 22 - 1 - 2
- Earnings: £12,212,756

Major wins
- UAE Derby (2021); Glorious Stakes (2022); Grosser Preis von Berlin (2022, 2025); Preis von Europa (2022, 2024); Breeders' Cup Turf (2022, 2024); H. H. The Amir Trophy (2024, 2025); Dubai Sheema Classic (2024); Hong Kong Champions & Chater Cup (2024); Yorkshire Cup (2025); Hardwicke Stakes (2025); Joe Hirsch Turf Classic Stakes (2025); Dubai City of Gold (2026); Princess of Wales's Stakes (2026)

Awards
- American Champion Male Turf Horse 2024 Eclipse award
- Last updated on 18 July 2026

Rebel's Romance (foaled 19 March 2018) is an Irish-bred, British-trained Thoroughbred middle-distance retired racehorse, bred and owned by Godolphin. In a career spanning seven seasons, he won 22 races, including nine Group or Grade 1 victories. Racing in eight countries, he became known as a globetrotter and international superstar. He was trained by Charlie Appleby in Newmarket and Dubai, and was ridden in all but five of his races by William Buick.

He raced twice on the all-weather in Britain as a two-year-old in 2020, winning on both occasions. As a three-year-old in 2021 he won the Group 2 UAE Derby on the dirt in Dubai, but his career took off in 2022 when he was switched to turf and went on to win a Group 3 and three Group 1 races, including the Breeders' Cup Turf. After a disappointing season in 2023, he regained his form in 2024 with four more victories at the highest level, including a second Breeders' Cup Turf, for which he was awarded the American Champion Male Turf Horse at the 2024 Eclipse awards. There were further Group 1 successes in 2025, but he narrowly failed to win an historic third Breeders' Cup Turf. After winning two Group 2 races in 2026, he was retired as an eight-year-old. He had won over £12 million in prize money and won races in Britain, Germany, the US, Hong Kong, the United Arab Emirates, Qatar and Saudi Arabia.

== Background ==
Rebel's Romance is a brown gelding who was bred in Ireland by Sheikh Mohammed's Godolphin racing enterprise and who raced in Godolphin's colours. His sire, Dubawi, was the winner of three Group 1 races, including the Irish 2,000 Guineas. His dam, Minidress, was runner-up in the Listed Height of Fashion Stakes. He was sent into training with Charlie Appleby, who is based at Moulton Paddocks in Newmarket but also trains during the winter at Godolphin's Marmoon stables in Dubai.

== Racing career ==
Racing silks of Godolphin

=== 2020: Two-year-old season ===
Rebel's Romance began his career at Newcastle in October 2020, winning a Novice Stakes race on the all-weather surface by a length as the 9/2 third choice in a field of nine runners. He followed up in November with a four-length victory at Kempton Park as the 11/10 favourite, again on the all-weather surface.

=== 2021: Three-year-old season ===
Rebel's Romance overwintered in Dubai and opened his three-year-old campaign in the UAE 2000 Guineas Trial over a mile at Meydan at in January. Settling in mid-division after the start, he made progress with a quarter-mile out, leading with one furlong to run to win by a head over the US-bred Mouheeb. On 20 February, in the Al Rajhi Bank Saudi Derby in Saudi Arabia, Rebel's Romance finished fourth to the Japanese-bred Pink Kamehameha.

In his next assignment, Rebel's Romance was entered in the UAE Derby, a major event in the Road to the Kentucky Derby. After starting towards the rear, jockey William Buick pushed him after being outpaced after one furlong. He moved into second place over a furlong out, then hit the front and was clear in the final 100 yards, drawing away to a 5 1/2-length victory. Although Rebel's Romance earned 100 points for the victory, which would ensure a spot in the Kentucky Derby, trainer Charlie Appleby wasn't committed for his plans.

Although Rebel's Romance was in fifth place in the 2021 Road to the Kentucky Derby standings trainer Appleby commented on social media, "Having spoken to His Highness Sheikh Mohammed, we feel (Rebel's Romance) needs more time, and he will now be aimed at the last leg of the US Triple Crown, the G1 Belmont Stakes." After arriving in the United States in May and after a couple of workouts in preparation for the Belmont Stakes, Rebel's Romance was found to have a hind leg infection and was withdrawn from consideration for the event.

=== 2022: Four-year-old season ===
In early 2022, Rebel's Romance ran unplaced in two races at Meydan over 1 1/4 miles before returning to Moulton Paddocks for summer season. In June he was stepped up to 1 1/2 miles to contest the Listed Fred Archer Stakes on the July Course at Newmarket and won by 3 3/4 lengths. He followed this with victory in the Glorious Stakes at Goodwood. In August, ridden by James Doyle, he won the Group 1 Grosser Preis von Berlin at Hoppegarten in Germany. After the race, Appleby said: "Rebel’s Romance has got a nice progressive profile, we've probably been running him on the wrong surface for so many years but now we've switched him to turf he's three from three and enjoying it". He returned to Germany in October to win the Group 1 Preis von Europa at Cologne under William Buick.

On 5 November, in the Breeders' Cup Turf at Keeneland in the US, Rebel's Romance started slowly. Jockey Doyle said that, after a slow break, "We ended up in a nice position". He added: "I was keen to get him off the inside rail and get him out to the middle of the track. It was a little raw on the turns." Rebel's Romance ran on strongly to win by 2 1/4 lengths from Irish-bred Stone Age and War Like Goddess in third. Rebel's Romance finished the 1 1/2 miles on firm turf in course-record time of 2:26.35.

=== 2023: Five-year-old season ===
Rebel's Romance was initially scheduled to start the season with the Dubai City of Gold on 1 March, but due to inflammation in a foreleg, he was withdrawn. On 25 March, he was entered in the Dubai Sheema Classic, where he finished seventh of ten runners, eleven lengths behind the winner, Equinox.

On 30 July, at Saratoga Race Course in New York, Rebel's Romance started odds-on favourite in Bowling Green Stakes, but he clipped heels and stumbled, unseating jockey Richard Mullen. Rebel's Romance was unhurt, but Mullen was taken to hospital with injuries including broken ribs and three fractured vertebrae and did not return to racing until November.

Rebel's Romance finished fourth at the Joe Hirsch Turf Classic Stakes at Aqueduct in New York before being entered in the Grosser Preis von Bayern, only to be scratched. His final race of the year was the Wild Flower Stakes on the all-weather at Kempton, which he won.

=== 2024: Six-year-old season ===
Rebel's Romance started what was to be his most successful year with a win in the Group 3 Amir Trophy on turf in Doha. He then started a 25/1 outsider in his second attempt at the Dubai Sheema Classic at Meydan and won the race by two lengths to net £2.74 million, the biggest prize of his career. After the race Appleby said: "He's got the world at his feet now. He deserves a bit of rest but hopefully he's going to be one of our flagbearers for the season." Rebel's Romance continued his successful season with a win in the Hong Kong Champions & Chater Cup at Sha Tin Racecourse, before coming third in the King George VI and Queen Elizabeth Stakes at Royal Ascot. He then won the Preis von Europa at Cologne for a second time.

In November 2024, Rebel's Romance started favourite at Del Mar to win his second Breeders' Cup Turf. He won by a neck, taking his tally of Group and Grade 1 races to nine and his earnings to more than £9 million. By this time he was being referred to as a "globetrotter" and "international superstar". He was named the American Champion Male Turf Horse at the 2024 Eclipse awards.

=== 2025: Seven-year-old season ===
Rebel's Romance started the year with a second win in the Amir Trophy, this time held at Al-Uqda Racecourse. He then came fourth in an attempt to win a second Dubai Sheema Classic before returning to Newmarket for the summer. In May he raced over 1 3/4 miles for the only time in the Yorkshire Cup at York. He started at 11/10 favourite and won by a head after a slowly-run race that ended in a sprint finish with the field of five virtually level as they approached the post. He then won the Group 2 Hardwicke Stakes on the last day of the Royal Ascot Meeting in June, and returned to the same racecourse in July to come third in the King George VI and Queen Elizabeth Stakes. A trip to Germany in August secured him a second win in the Grosser Preis von Berlin. It was a first Group 1 success for jockey Billy Loughnane, who had been given the ride as William Buick was due to ride at Deauville.

In September, Rebel's Romance, ridden by Frankie Dettori, won the Joe Hirsch Turf Classic Stakes at Belmont Park in New York. With William Buick back in the saddle, he then attempted an historic third win in the Breeders' Cup Turf, only to be beaten 1 1/4 lengths into second place by outsider Ethical Diamond, trained by Willie Mullins.

=== 2026: Eight-year-old season and retirement ===
In February, Rebel's Romance won the Group 2 Dubai City of Gold at Meydan. After the race, Appleby said: ""He's getting older so we'll take it race by race, but we wanted him to show everyone what a great racehorse he is and thankfully he's done it again tonight". His next race was on 9 July 2026 on the July Course at Newmarket, where he had run for the first time on turf four years previously. Starting odds-on favourite in a field of four, he won the Group 2 Princess of Wales's Stakes by 1/2 a length from stablemate Arabian Crown in spite of tiring in the closing stages of the race.

Eight days after his victory in the Princess of Wales's Stakes, Godolphin announced the retirement of Rebel's Romance. Over his seven seasons of racing, he had won 22 of his 32 starts and amassed over £12 million in prize money, making him Godolphin's highest ever earner. Nine of his victories had been at Group or Grade 1 level. Appleby explained the decision: "After yet another brilliant win at Newmarket last week, we all discussed it and felt now is the right time to call it a day. It's been an absolute honour to train such an amazing horse, who has been a dream to look after from the moment he arrived." William Buick, who had ridden Rebel's Romance in all but five of his races, said he had been privileged to ride such a wonderful horse.

== Statistics ==
Date	Distance	Race	Grade/ Group	Course	Odds	Field	Finish	Winning time	Winning (Losing) margin	Jockey	Winner (2nd Place)	Ref
2020 – two-year-old season
26 Oct 2020	1 mile 5 yards	Novice Stakes		Newcastle	9/2	9	1	1:41.74	1 length	William Buick	(Movin Time)	
18 Nov 2020	1 mile	Novice Stakes		Kempton Park	11/10*	12	1	1:37.95	4 lengths	William Buick	(Anmaat)	
2021 – three-year-old season
14 Jan 2021	1600 metres (Note: Distance for the event was approximately one mile)	UAE 2000 Guineas Trial		Meydan	N/A (Note: Rebel's Romance final odds in the UAE 2000 Guineas Trial with British Bookmakers were 1/2 odds-on since gambling is prohibited in the United Arab Emirates)	10	1	1:37.55	head	William Buick	(Mouheeb)	
20 Feb 2021	1600 metres (Note: Distance for the event was approximately one mile)	Saudi Derby		King Abdulaziz Racetrack	N/A (Note: Rebel's Romance final odds in the Saudi Derby with British Bookmakers were 9/4 joint favorite since gambling is prohibited in the United Arab Emirates)	12	4	1:38.57	(5 lengths)	William Buick	Pink Kamehameha	
27 Mar 2021	1900 metres (Note: Distance for the event was approximately 1 3/16 miles)	UAE Derby	II	Meydan	N/A (Note: Rebel's Romance final odds in the UAE Derby with British Bookmakers were 8/1 since gambling is prohibited in the United Arab Emirates)	14	1	1:56.28	5 1/2 lengths	William Buick	(Panadol)	
2022 – four-year-old season
21 Jan 2022	2000 metres (Note: Distance for the event was approximately 1 1/4 miles)	Aliyah By Azizi		Meydan	N/A (Note: Rebel's Romance final odds in the Aliyah By Azizi with British Bookmakers were 8/11 odds-on since gambling is prohibited in the United Arab Emirates)	16	8	2:03.46	(24 3/4 lengths)	William Buick	Dubai Icon	
11 Feb 2022	2000 metres	Curlin Stakes	Listed	Meydan	N/A (Note: Rebel's Romance final odds in the Curlin Stakes with British Bookmakers were 3/1 since gambling is prohibited in the United Arab Emirates)	13	11	2:08.12	(26 3/4 lengths)	William Buick	Appreciated	
25 Jun 2022	1 1/2 miles	Fred Archer Stakes	Listed	Newmarket	9/4*	4	1	2:35.75	3 3/4 lengths	William Buick	(Kemari)	
29 Jul 2022	1m 3f 218y	Glorious Stakes (Note: The registered Glorious Stakes was run as the L'Ormarins Queen's Plate Glorious Stakes due to sponsorship)	III	Goodwood	4/5*	8	1	2:34.89	1 length	William Buick	(Kemari)	
14 Aug 2022	2400 metres (Note: Distance for the event was approximately one and a half miles)	Grosser Preis von Berlin	I	Hoppegarten	Evens*	8	1	2:32.33	neck	James Doyle	(Nerik)	
25 Sep 2022	2400 metres (Note: Distance for the event was approximately one and a half miles)	Preis von Europa	I	Cologne	13/10*	7	1	2:30.97	3/4 length	William Buick	(Sammarco)	
6 Nov 2022	1 1/2 miles	Breeders' Cup Turf	I	Keeneland	5.96	13	1	2:26.35 (Note: Rebel's Romance set a new track record for the distance)	2 1/4 lengths	James Doyle	(Stone Age)	
2023 – five-year-old season
25 Mar 2023	2410 metres (Note: Distance for the event was approximately 1 1/2 miles)	Dubai Sheema Classic	I	Meydan	N/A (Note: Rebel's Romance final odds with British Bookmakers were 3/1 since gambling is prohibited in the United Arab Emirates)	10	7	2:25.65	(11 lengths)	William Buick	Equinox	
30 Jul 2023	1 3/8 miles	Bowling Green Stakes	II	Saratoga	0.55*	9	fell	2:15.21	DNF	Richard Mullen	Channel Maker	
7 Oct 2023	1 1/2 miles	Joe Hirsch Turf Classic	I	Aqueduct	0.55*	8	4	2:32.86 (Note: The winner War Like Goddess set a new track record for the distance on the outer turf track at Aqueduct)	(5 3/4 lengths)	William Buick	War Like Goddess	
13 Dec 2023	1m 3f 219y	Wild Flower Stakes	Listed	Kempton Park	4/5*	8	1	1:37.95	1 1/4 lengths	William Buick	(Elegant Man)	
2024 – six-year-old season
17 Feb 2024	2400 metres (Note: Distance for the event was approximately one and a half miles)	H H The Amir Trophy	III	Doha	N/A (Note: Gambling is prohibited in Qatar)	11	1	2:28.84	3 lengths	William Buick	(Zeffiro)	
30 Mar 2024	2410 metres (Note: Distance for the event was approximately 1 1/2 miles)	Dubai Sheema Classic	I	Meydan	N/A (Note: Rebel's Romance final odds with British Bookmakers were 3/1 since gambling is prohibited in the United Arab Emirates)	10	1	2:26.72	2 lengths	William Buick	(Shahryar)	
26 May 2024	2400 metres (Note: Distance for the event was approximately 1 1/2 miles)	Hong Kong Champions & Chater Cup	I	Sha Tin	0.40 (Note: Rebel's Romance final odds with Hong Kong Jockey Club were 1.4 (decimal odds) which is equivalent to 2/5 odds-on in fractional odds)	8	1	2:25.62	2 lengths	William Buick	(Five G Patch)	
27 July 2024	1m 3f 211y	King George VI and Queen Elizabeth Stakes	I	Ascot	5/2	9	3	2:27.43	(5 1/2 lengths)	William Buick	Goliath	
22 Sep 2024	2400 metres (Note: Distance for the event was approximately one and a half miles)	Preis von Europa	I	Cologne	3/5*	6	1	2:25.91	neck	William Buick	(Straight)	
2 Nov 2024	1 1/2 miles	Breeders' Cup Turf	I	Del Mar	1.90*	13	1	2:26.07	neck	William Buick	(Rousham Park)	
2025 – seven-year-old season
16 Feb 2025	2300 metres (Note: Distance for the event was approximately one and a seven-sixteenths miles)	H H The Amir Trophy	III	Al Uqda	N/A (Note: Gambling is prohibited in Qatar)	8	1	2:14.96	1 length	William Buick	(The Foxes)	
5 Apr 2025	2410 metres (Note: Distance for the event was approximately 1 1/2 miles)	Dubai Sheema Classic	I	Meydan	N/A (Note: Rebel's Romance final odds with British Bookmakers were 9/4 second favourite since gambling is prohibited in the United Arab Emirates)	9	4	2:27.05	(3 1/4 lengths)	William Buick	Danon Decile	
16 May 2025	1m 5f 188y	Yorkshire Cup	II	York	11/10*	5	1	3:07.88	head	William Buick	(Epic Poet)	
21 Jun 2025	1m 3f 211y	Hardwicke Stakes	II	Ascot	6/4*	12	1	2:28.23	1 3/4 lengths	William Buick	(Al Riffa)	
26 July 2025	1m 3f 211y	King George VI and Queen Elizabeth Stakes	I	Ascot	5/1	5	3	2:29.74	(3 1/2 lengths)	William Buick	Calandagan	
10 Aug 2025	2400 metres (Note: Distance for the event was approximately one and a half miles)	Grosser Preis von Berlin	I	Hoppegarten	1/5*	6	1	2:27.81	3/4 length	Billy Loughnane	(Junko)	
27 Sep 2025	1 1/2 miles	Joe Hirsch Turf Classic	I	Aqueduct	0.64*	5	1	2:25.72	3 1/2 lengths	Frankie Dettori	(Redistricting)	
1 Nov 2025	1 1/2 miles	Breeders' Cup Turf	I	Del Mar	11/5	14	2	2:25.45	(1 1/4 lengths)	William Buick	Ethical Diamond	
2026 – eight-year-old season
28 Feb 2026	2400 metres	Dubai City of Gold	II	Nad Al Sheba	2/9	8	1	2:28.73	1 1/2 lengths	William Buick	(Fort George)	
9 Jul 2026	1m 4f	Princess of Wales's Stakes	II	Newmarket	8/11	4	1	2:27.83	1/2 lengths	William Buick	(Arabian Crown)	

Legend:
Turf Dirt All--weather track
Notes:
An (*) asterisk after the odds means Rebel's Romance was the post-time favorite.

== Pedigree ==
Pedigree of Rebel's Romance (IRE), dark bay or brown gelding, March 19, 2018
Sire Dubawi (IRE) (2002)	Dubai Millennium (GB) (1996)	Seeking The Gold (1985)	Mr Prospector* (1970)
Sire Dubawi (IRE) (2002)	Dubai Millennium (GB) (1996)	Seeking The Gold (1985)	Con Game (1974)
Sire Dubawi (IRE) (2002)	Dubai Millennium (GB) (1996)	Colorado Dancer (IRE) (1986)	Shareef Dancer (1980)
Sire Dubawi (IRE) (2002)	Dubai Millennium (GB) (1996)	Colorado Dancer (IRE) (1986)	Fall Aspen (1976)
Sire Dubawi (IRE) (2002)	Zomaradah (GB) (1995)	Deploy (GB) (1987)	Shirley Heights (GB) (1975)
Sire Dubawi (IRE) (2002)	Zomaradah (GB) (1995)	Deploy (GB) (1987)	Slightly Dangerous (1979)
Sire Dubawi (IRE) (2002)	Zomaradah (GB) (1995)	Jawaher (IRE) (1989)	Dancing Brave (1983)
Sire Dubawi (IRE) (2002)	Zomaradah (GB) (1995)	Jawaher (IRE) (1989)	High Tern (IRE) (1982)
Dam Minidress (GB) (2009)	Street Cry (IRE) (1998)	Machiavellian (1987)	Mr Prospector* (1970)
Dam Minidress (GB) (2009)	Street Cry (IRE) (1998)	Machiavellian (1987)	Coup De Folie (1982)
Dam Minidress (GB) (2009)	Street Cry (IRE) (1998)	Helen Street (GB) (1982)	Troy (GB) (1976)
Dam Minidress (GB) (2009)	Street Cry (IRE) (1998)	Helen Street (GB) (1982)	Waterway (FR) (1976)
Dam Minidress (GB) (2009)	Short Skirt (GB) (2003)	Diktat (GB) (1995)	Warning (GB) (1985)
Dam Minidress (GB) (2009)	Short Skirt (GB) (2003)	Diktat (GB) (1995)	Arvolo (GB) (1990)
Dam Minidress (GB) (2009)	Short Skirt (GB) (2003)	Much Too Risky (GB) (1982)	Bustino (GB) (1971)
Dam Minidress (GB) (2009)	Short Skirt (GB) (2003)	Much Too Risky (GB) (1982)	Short Rations (GB) (1975) (family 8-d)

* Rebel's Romance is inbred 4S x 4D to the stallion Mr Prospector, meaning that he appears fourth generation on the sire side of his pedigree and fourth on the dam side of his pedigree.
