= Kirsty Milczarek =

British jockey

Kirsty Milczarek is a former professional jockey. She is of Polish descent but was born in the UK, where she is based in Newmarket.

== Riding career ==
Kirsty Milczarek became involved in horse racing after leaving a successful career in showjumping. She rode her first winner on Levantine at Lingfield in 2004. and rose to prominence during a successful winter in 2007/2008, where she rode 42 all-weather race winners between November and March. becoming leading all-weather apprentice in the process. In February 2008, she rode three winners on one afternoon, at Kempton Park, the first time that this had been achieved by a female rider in the UK.

Kirsty Milczarek became one of a small number of female jockeys to achieve professional status in August 2008 by riding out her claim (a "claim" is the weight reduction given to the weight horses carry when ridden by less experienced riders; in the UK a claim is no longer assigned to a jockey once they have ridden 95 winners).

On 20 May 2011, it was reported that Milczarek, along with three other jockeys and a trainer had "intentionally failed to ensure that a horse ran on its merits", and subsequently charged under the sport's anti-corruption rules. In December 2011, she was found guilty by the British Horseracing Authority and banned from riding for two years, but immediately lodged an appeal. On 10 April 2012, Milczarek's ban was overturned by the BHA's appeals panel after new evidence was presented. After this, she returned to race riding, including continuing to ride for Luca Cumani. Her last victories to date came in 2013, when she won 21 races from 261 rides.
