= Fleur De Lys Fillies' Stakes =

Flat horse race in Britain

Fleur De Lys Fillies' Stakes
2025
Sky Safari	Zariela	Queen's Reign

Previous years
2024
Doom	Improvista	Back See Daa
2023
Queen Aminatu	Potapova	Al Agaila
2022
Queen Aminatu	Roman Mist	Internationalangel
2021
Maamora	Roman Mist	Declared Interest

2020-2011
2020
Indie Angel	Lavender's Blue	Ummalnar
2019
Scentasia	Chaleur	She's Got You
2018
Rasima	Move Swiftly	Summer Icon
2017
Muffri'Ha	Zest	Promising Run
2016
Muffri'Ha	Aljuljalah	Home Cummins
2015
Lamar	Very Special	Clarentine
2014
Tearless	Lamar	Wahgah
2013
Forgive	Galician	Masarah
2012
Sentaril	Burke's Rock	Love Your Looks
2011
Clinical	Sooraah	Mosqueras Romance

2010-2003
2010
Aspectoflove	Mosqueras Romance	Forest Crown
2009
Moonlife	Ahla Wasahl	Apple Charlotte
2008
Baharah	Harvest Queen	Kylayne
2007
Sesmen	Fidelia	Wagtail
2006
Mayonga	Emily Bronte	Kindlelight Debut
2005
Zayn Zen	Brindisi	Attune
2004
Miss George	Tahirah	Zietory
2003
Tadris	Zietory	Presto Vento

The Fleur De Lys Fillies' Stakes is a Listed flat horse race in Great Britain open to mares and fillies aged three years or over. It is run over a distance of 1 mile and 1 yard (1,610 metres) at Lingfield Park in late October or early November.

The race was first run in 2003.

== Records ==
Most successful horse (2 wins):

- Muffri'Ha – 2016, 2017
- Queen Aminatu - 2022, 2023

Leading jockey (3 wins):

- Frankie Dettori – Moonlife (2009), Aspectoflove (2010), Indie Angel (2020)

Leading trainer (6 wins):

- William Haggas – Sentaril (2012), Muffri'Ha (2016, 2017), Queen Aminatu (2022,2023), Doom (2024)

== Winners ==
Year	Winner	Age	Jockey	Trainer	Time
2003	Tadris	3	Richard Hills	Marcus Tregoning	1:40.69
2004	Miss George	6	Dane O'Neill	Dean Ivory	1:38.10
2005	Zayn Zen	3	Philip Robinson	Michael Jarvis	1:38.68
2006	Mayonga	3	Seb Sanders	Sir Mark Prescott	0:00.00
2007	Sesmen	3	Oscar Urbina	Marco Botti	1:36.57
2008	Baharah	4	Hayley Turner	Gerard Butler	1:34.77
2009	Moonlife	3	Frankie Dettori	Saeed bin Suroor	1:36.93
2010	Aspectoflove	4	Frankie Dettori	Saeed bin Suroor	1:36.71
2011	Clinical	3	Seb Sanders	Sir Mark Prescott	1:35.96
2012	Sentaril	3	Graham Lee	William Haggas	1:36.17
2013	Forgive	4	Silvestre De Sousa	Richard Hannon Sr.	1:35.48
2014	Tearless	4	Adam Kirby	Charlie Appleby	1:35.03
2015	Lamar	4	Luke Morris	James Tate	1:37.46
2016	Muffri'Ha	4	Pat Cosgrave	William Haggas	1:36.53
2017	Muffri'Ha	5	James Doyle	William Haggas	1:35.01
2018	Rasima	3	David Egan	Roger Varian	1:34.63
2019	Scentasia	3	David Egan	John Gosden	1:35.65
2020	Indie Angel	3	Frankie Dettori	John Gosden	1:35.10
2021	Maamora	5	James Doyle	Simon & Ed Crisford	1:35.05
2022	Queen Aminatu	3	Cieren Fallon	William Haggas	1:35.69
2023	Queen Aminatu	4	Cieren Fallon	William Haggas	1:34.24
2024	Doom	4	Rossa Ryan	William Haggas	1:37.00
2025	Sky Safari	4	Daniel Muscutt	James Fanshawe	1:37.75
2026	Kon Tiki	4	Ryan Moore	Jane Chapple-Hyam	1:35.95

== See also ==
- Horse racing in Great Britain
- List of British flat horse races
