= Rose of Lancaster Stakes =

Flat horse race in Britain

- Class: Group 3
- Location: Haydock Park; Haydock, England
- Inaugurated: 1986
- Race type: Flat / Thoroughbred
- Sponsor: Betfred
- Website: Haydock Park

Race information
- Distance: 1m 2f 100y (2,103m)
- Surface: Turf
- Track: Left-handed
- Qualification: Three-years-old and up
- Weight: 8 st 13 lb (3yo); 9 st 7 lb (4yo+); Allowances; 3 lb for fillies and mares Penalties; 7 lb for Group 1 winners * 5 lb for Group 2 winners* 3 lb for Group 3 winners * * after 2024
- Purse: £80,000 (2025); 1st: £48,204

Rose Of Lancaster Stakes
2026
Sallaal	Sea Scout	Nahraan

Previous years
2025
Royal Dubai	Military Order	Haunted Dream
2024
Anmaat	Certain Lad	Regal Reality
2023
Al Aasy	El Drama	Midnight Mile
2022
Anmaat	Grocer Jack	Certain Lad
2021
Foxes Tales	Fancy Man	Majestic Dawn

2020-2011
2020
Extra Elusive	Certain Lad	Global Giant
2019
Addeybb	Pondus	Raise You
2018
Teodoro	Brorocco	Zaaki
2017
Frankuus	Mount Logan	Laraaib
2016
Royal Artillery	Scottish	Arab Spring
2015
Intilaaq	Master Carpenter	Fire Fighting
2014
Amralah	Hillstar	True Story
2013
David Livingston	Telescope	Noble Mission
2012
Hunter's Light	Jet Away	Gabrial
2011
Class Is Class	Elusive Pimpernel	Hot Prospect

2010-2001
2010
Poet	Class Is Class	Distant Memories
2009
Jukebox Jury	Campanologist	Duncan
2008
Multidimensional	Bahia Breeze	Spanish Moon
2007
Halicarnassus	Formal Decree	Zaham
2006
Mulaqat	Notable Guest	Hattan
2005
Notable Guest	David Junior	Welcome Stranger
2004
Mister Monet	Muqbil	Checkit
2003
Sabre d'Argent	Far Lane	Izdiham
2001
Nayef	Chianti	Down To The Woods

2000-1991
2000
Ekraar	Forbearing	Epic Express
1999
Greek Dance	Prolix	Moutahddee
1998
Mutamam	Teapot Row	Prince Of Denial
1997
Romanov	Germano	Fahris
1996
Tamayaz	Ela-Aristokrati	Captain Horatius
1995
Fahal	Young Buster	Sonic Boy
1994
Urgent Request	Cezanne	Luhuk
1993
Knifebox	Colway Rock	Half A Tick
1992
Half A Tick	Spartan Shareef	Fast Manouvre
1991
Lord Of Tusmore	Song Of Sixpence	Lord Charmer

1990-1988
1990
Defensive Play	Alphabel	Starstreak
1989
Braiswick	Pelorus	Batshoof
1988
Galitzin	Rambo Dancer	Media Starguest

The Rose of Lancaster Stakes is a Group 3 flat horse race in Great Britain open to horses aged three years or older. It is run at Haydock Park over a distance of 1 mile, 2 furlongs and 100 yards (2,103 metres), and it is scheduled to take place each year in early August.

== History ==
The event was established in 1986, and it was initially called the Summer Trophy. It was given its current title and promoted from Listed to Group 3 status in 1989. For a period it was sponsored by Burtonwood Brewery, and it was later backed by the property development firm Petros. The Tote began sponsoring the event in 2007.

The Rose of Lancaster Stakes was formerly contested over 1 mile, 2 furlongs and 120 yards. It was cut to its present distance in 2009. The sponsorship of the race was adopted by Betfred when the company bought the Tote in 2011, and in 2012 it was sponsored by Victor Chandler International. Betfred took over the sponsorship again from 2013 to 2017.

== Records ==
Most successful horse (2 Wins):

- Amnaat (2022, 2024)

Leading jockey (3 wins):

- Richard Hills – Fahal (1995), Ekraar (2000), Nayef (2001)
- Joe Fanning - Mister Monet (2004), Amralah (2014), Frankuus (2017)
- Jim Crowley - Amnaat (2022, 2024), Al Aasy (2023)

Leading trainer (3 wins):

- Sir Michael Stoute – Greek Dance (1999), Notable Guest (2005), Class Is Class (2011)
- Marcus Tregoning – Ekraar (2000), Nayef (2001), Mulaqat (2006)
- Mark Johnston - Mister Monet (2004), Jukebox Jury (2009), Frankuus (2017)
- Owen Burrows - Amnaat (2022, 2024), Royal Dubai (2025)

== Winners ==
Year	Winner	Age	Jockey	Trainer	Time
1986	Wassl Touch	3	Willie Carson	Dick Hern	2:14.49
1987	Free Fact	3	Willie Carson	Dick Hern	2:19.28
1988	Galitzin	3	Steve Cauthen	Clive Brittain	2:14.04
1989	Braiswick	3	Gary Carter	Geoff Wragg	2:16.79
1990	Defensive Play	3	Pat Eddery	Guy Harwood	2:11.37
1991	Lord of Tusmore	4	Alan Munro	Barry Hills	2:16.03
1992	Half a Tick	4	Chris Rutter	Paul Cole	2:17.01
1993	Knifebox	5	Michael Roberts	John Gosden	2:19.70
1994	Urgent Request	4	Richard Quinn	Reg Akehurst	2:09.59
1995	Fahal	3	Richard Hills	David Morley	2:08.53
1996	Tamayaz	4	Gary Carter	Saeed bin Suroor	2:13.15
1997	Romanov	3	David Harrison	Peter Chapple-Hyam	2:10.52
1998	Mutamam	3	Michael Roberts	Alec Stewart	2:14.92
1999	Greek Dance	4	Gary Stevens	Sir Michael Stoute	2:16.60
2000	Ekraar	3	Richard Hills	Marcus Tregoning	2:13.07
2001	Nayef	3	Richard Hills	Marcus Tregoning	2:12.86
2002	Abandoned due to waterlogging
2003	Sabre d'Argent	3	Eddie Ahern	David Loder	2:10.78
2004	Mister Monet	3	Joe Fanning	Mark Johnston	2:10.40
2005	Notable Guest	4	Richard Hughes	Sir Michael Stoute	2:17.17
2006	Mulaqat	3	Neil Callan	Marcus Tregoning	2:10.29
2007	Halicarnassus	3	Tadhg O'Shea	Mick Channon	2:15.76
2008	Multidimensional	5	Ted Durcan	Henry Cecil	2:22.92
2009	Jukebox Jury	3	Royston Ffrench	Mark Johnston	2:09.95
2010	Poet	5	Adam Kirby	Clive Cox	2:17.31
2011	Class Is Class	5	Kieren Fallon	Sir Michael Stoute	2:15.40
2012	Hunter's Light	4	Silvestre de Sousa	Saeed bin Suroor	2:11.73
2013	David Livingston	4	Johnny Murtagh	Mike de Kock	2:11.83
2014	Amralah	4	Joe Fanning	Mick Channon	2:10.96
2015	Intilaaq	3	Paul Hanagan	Roger Varian	2:09.21
2016	Royal Artillery	3	Colm O'Donoghue	John Gosden	2:07.71
2017	Frankuus	3	Joe Fanning	Mark Johnston	2:14.46
2018	Teodoro	4	Richard Kingscote	Tom Dascombe	2:07.53
2019	Addeybb	5	Richard Kingscote	William Haggas	2:15.47
2020	Extra Elusive	5	Hollie Doyle	Roger Charlton	2:10.46
2021	Foxes Tales	3	Silvestre de Sousa	Andrew Balding	2:18.65
2022	Amnaat	4	Jim Crowley	Owen Burrows	2:11.04
2023	Al Aasy	6	Jim Crowley	William Haggas	2:12.74
2024	Amnaat	6	Jim Crowley	Owen Burrows	2:09.44
2025	Royal Dubai	5	Callum Rodriguez	Owen Burrows	2:10.34
2026	Sallaal	4	Ray Dawson	Roger Varian	2:10.91

== See also ==
- Horse racing in Great Britain
- List of British flat horse races
