= Bedford House Stables =

Stable in Newmarket, Suffolk, England

Coordinates: 52.2497°N 0.4144°E

Bedford House Stables is a stables building in Newmarket, Suffolk, UK. It was the main training yard of Luca Cumani. After Cumani's retirement at the end of the 2018 flat racing season, the yard was purchased by trainer Charlie Fellowes.

It is located next to the prestigious Bury Road in Newmarket, and became a British Listed building on 30 October 2006. The original construction dates to the 1820s and was built for Francis Russell, 7th Duke of Bedford. Upon his death, the property changed hands multiple times, eventually being bought by horse racing enthusiast James Octavius Machell. In 1892, the property was sold to Henry McCalmont.
