= Hever Sprint Stakes =

Flat horse race in Britain

- Class: Listed
- Location: Lingfield Park Racecourse; Lingfield, England
- Race type: Flat / Thoroughbred
- Sponsor: Midnite
- Website: Lingfield

Race information
- Distance: 5f 6y (1,011 metres)
- Surface: Polytrack
- Track: Left-handed
- Qualification: Four-years-old and up
- Weight: 9 st 2 lb Allowances; 5 lb for fillies and mares Penalties; 7 lb for Group 1 / Group 2 winners* 5 lb for Group 3 winners * 3 lb for Listed winners * * since 31 August 2025
- Purse: £60,000 (2026); 1st: £34,488

Hever Sprint Stakes
2025
Clarendon House	Marshman	Valiant Force

Previous years
2024
Diligent Harry	Juan Les Pins	Clarendon House
2023
Kimngrace	Tone The Barone	Miss Nay Never
2022
One Night Stand	Mondammej	Strong Power
2021
Lord Riddiford	Moss Gill	Blue De Vega

2020-2011
2020
Hareem Queen	Royal Birth	Watchable
2019
Gorgeous Noora	Royal Birth	Corinthia Knight
2018
Gracious John	Encore d'Or	Tomily
2017
Royal Birth	Lancelot Du Lac	Verne Castle
2016
Lightscameraction	Take Cover	Muthmir
2015
Pretend	Alben Star	Boom The Groom
2014
Stepper Point	Iptisam	Even Stevens
2013
Ladies Are Forever	Timeless Call	Tarooq
2012
Fratellino	Spirit Quartz	Bajan Tryst
2011
Anne Of Kiev	Silaah	Lui Rei

2010-2003
2010
Arganil	Glamorous Spirit	Jaconet
2009
Arganil	Judd Street	Judge 'n Jury
2008
Conquest	Matsunosuke	Stoneacre Lad
2007
King Orchisios	Bonus	Strike Up The Band
2006
Les Arcs	Fyodor	One More Round
2005
Dancing Mystery	Fast Heart	Zarzu
2004
No Time	Speed Cop	Justalord
2003
Peruvian Chief	Kier Park	Justalord

The Hever Sprint Stakes is a Listed flat horse race in Great Britain open to horses aged four years and over. It is run at Southwell over a distance of 5 furlongs and 6 yards (1,011 metres), and it is scheduled to take place each year in February or March.

The race was first run in 2003 at Lingfield Park, and was awarded Listed status in 2007. It was switched to Southwell in 2024. In 2026 it returned to Lingfield Park.

== Records ==
Most successful horse (2 wins):

- Arganil – 2009, 2010
- Diligent Harry - 2024, 2026

Leading jockey (3 wins):

- Neil Callan – King Orchisios (2007), Arganil (2009, 2010)

Leading trainer (3 wins):

- Kevin Ryan – King Orchisios (2007), Arganil (2009, 2010)

== Winners ==
Year	Winner	Age	Jockey	Trainer	Time
2003	Peruvian Chief	6	Darryll Holland	Nick Littmoden	0:59.32
2004	No Time	4	Frankie Dettori	Mark Polglase	0:57.39
2005	Dancing Mystery	11	Stephen Carson	Eric Wheeler	0:58.98
2006	Les Arcs	6	John Egan	Tim Pitt	0:58.70
2007	King Orchisios	4	Neil Callan	Kevin Ryan	0:57.87
2008	Conquest	4	Jimmy Fortune	William Haggas	0:58.38
2009	Arganil	4	Neil Callan	Kevin Ryan	0:57.50
2010	Arganil	5	Neil Callan	Kevin Ryan	0:57.49
2011	Anne Of Kiev	6	Steve Drowne	Jeremy Gask	0:58.46
2012	Fratellino	5	Martin Harley	Alan McCabe	0:58.84
2013	Ladies Are Forever	5	William Twiston-Davies	Geoff Oldroyd	0:56.67
2014	Stepper Point	5	Martin Dwyer	Willie Muir	0:57.12
2015	Pretend	4	Adam Kirby	Charlie Appleby	0:58.08
2016	Lightscameraction	4	Luke Morris	Gay Kelleway	0:57.90
2017	Royal Birth	6	Aaron Jones	Stuart Williams	0:56.77
2018	Gracious John	5	Fran Berry	David Evans	0:58.59
2019	Gorgeous Noora	5	Hollie Doyle	Archie Watson	0:56.92
2020	Hareem Queen	6	P. J. McDonald	Karl Burke	0:57.10
2021	Lord Riddiford	6	Jason Hart	John Quinn	0:58.25
2022	One Night Stand	5	Hollie Doyle	Scott Dixon	0:57.18
2023	Kimngrace	4	George Rooke	Richard Hughes	0:57.31
2024	Diligent Harry	6	John Fahy	Clive Cox	0:57.31
2025	Clarendon House	7	Sean Levey	Robert Cowell	0:57.06
2026	Diligent Harry	8	Rossa Ryan	Clive Cox	0:56.37

== See also ==
- Horse racing in Great Britain
- List of British flat horse races
