= Jukebox Jury (horse) =

Irish-bred Thoroughbred racehorse

- Racing silks of Alan Spence
- Sire: Montjeu
- Grandsire: Sadler's Wells
- Dam: Mare Aux Fees
- Damsire: Kenmare
- Sex: Stallion
- Foaled: 15 February 2006
- Country: Ireland
- Colour: Grey
- Breeder: Paul Nataf
- Owner: Alan Spence
- Trainer: Mark Johnston
- Record: 22: 9-2-2
- Earnings: £859,084

Major wins
- Royal Lodge Stakes (2008); Rose of Lancaster Stakes (2009); Grand Prix de Deauville (2009); Preis von Europa (2009); Jockey Club Stakes (2010); Fred Archer Stakes (2011); Prix Kergorlay (2011); Irish St Leger (2011)

Jukebox Jury (foaled 15 February 2006) is an Irish-bred, British-trained Thoroughbred racehorse and sire. A successful and durable international campaigner, he won important races in each of his four seasons of racing and competed in Britain, France, Germany, Canada, Dubai, Ireland and Australia.

As a two-year-old in 2008 he showed great promise as he won the Royal Lodge Stakes and was placed in the Racing Post Trophy and Prix La Rochette. He had a delayed start to his second campaign but established himself as a top-class middle-distance performer with wins in the Rose of Lancaster Stakes, Grand Prix de Deauville and Preis von Europa as well as finishing second in the Canadian International Stakes. He won the Jockey Club Stakes at four but showed his best form a five-year-old when he won the Fred Archer Stakes, Prix Kergorlay and Irish St Leger.

He failed to recover fully from an injury sustained in the Melbourne Cup and was retired to become a breeding stallion in Germany.

== Background ==
Jukebox Jury is a grey horse bred in Ireland by Paul Nataf. As a yearling in August, the colt (then officially described as bay) was sent to the Arqana sale at Deauville where he was bought for €270,000 by the trainer Mark Johnston. The colt subsequently entered the ownership of Alan Spence and was taken into training with Johnston at his Middleham stable.

He was from the fifth crop of foals sired by Montjeu whose wins included the Prix du Jockey Club, Irish Derby, Prix de l'Arc de Triomphe and King George VI and Queen Elizabeth Stakes. As a breeding stallion his other progeny included Motivator, Authorized, Pour Moi, Camelot, Scorpion, Hurricane Fly, St Nicholas Abbey and Hurricane Run. Jukebox Jury's dam Mare Aux Fees, from whom he inherited his grey coat, showed no racing ability but did better as a broodmare, producing several other winners including the Prix Vanteaux winner Belle Allure. She came from a largely French family which had produced several good winners including Tropique (Eclipse Stakes), Lightning (Prix d'Ispahan) and Soleil Noir (Grand Prix de Paris).

== Racing career ==
=== 2008: two-year-old season ===
Jukebox Jury began his racing career in a seven furlong maiden race at Goodwood Racecourse on 2 August in which he was ridden by Johnny Murtagh and started a 14/1 outsider. After racing towards the rear of the field he made progress on the outside, caught the leaders in the closing stages and won by a neck despite looking "green" (inexperienced) and hanging right near the finish. Fifteen days later the colt was sent to France and moved up in class for the Listed Prix François Boutin over 1400 metres at Deauville Racecourse and finished fourth, seven lengths behind the Richard Hannon Sr.-trained Soul City after hanging left in the last 200 metres. He returned to France on 7 September for the Group 3 Prix La Rochette at Longchamp in which he was again matched against Soul City. He was again beaten by the Hannon colt but produced a much better as he stayed on well to take third place, half a length and three-quarters of a length behind Soul City and Milanais.

The Group 2 Royal Lodge Stakes at Ascot Racecourse saw Jukebox Jury start the 8/1 fourth choice in the betting behind Cityscape, Orizaba (winner of the Vintage Stakes) and the Henry Cecil-trained On Our Way. After being restrained at the rear of the field in the early stages by his jockey Royston Ffrench the colt began to make progress approaching the final turn and was switched to the outside to make his challenge in the straight. He caught Cityscape 30 yards from the finish and won by three-quarters of a length. Ffrench was again in the saddle when the colt was stepped up to Group 1 class and started 2/1 favourite for the Racing Post Trophy at Doncaster on 25 October. He stayed on well in the straight but was hampered a furlong from the finish and was beaten into second place by Crowded House.

=== 2009: three-year-old season ===
Jukebox Jury missed the spring of 2009 and made little impact on his seasonal debut when he finished last of seven in the Prix Daphnis over 1800 metres at Longchamp on 22 June. In a strongly contested edition of the Eclipse Stakes on 4 July he started a 50/1 outsider and came home sixth of the ten runners behind Sea the Stars. In August the colt was dropped back to Group 3 class for the Rose of Lancaster Stakes at Haydock Park and started 6/1 fourth choice in the betting. He was among the early leaders before being pulled back by Ffrench and then renewing his challenge in the straight. He overtook the favourite Campanologist inside the final furlong and won by one and a quarter lengths with the John Gosden-trained Duncan taking third place.

Ten days after his win at Haydock Jukebox Jury contested the Great Voltigeur Stakes over one and a half miles at York Racecourse and finished fourth behind Monitor Closely, Mastery and Father Time after stumbling a quarter of a mile from the finish. The colt was back in action less than two weeks later in France when he contested the Grand Prix de Deauville against older horses and started at odds of 9/4 against five opponents including Ideal World (Prix de Reux) and Kasbah Bliss (Prix Gladiateur). Jukebox Jury took the early lead and then settled in second behind Kasbah Bliss before regaining the advantage 300 metres from home. He just held off a late challenge from Pouvoir Absolu to prevail by a nose in a photo finish. Johnston commented "It wasn't the idea to make the running and Jukebox Jury is not the ideal horse for it, so we were delighted when Kasbah Bliss went on. We have had our eyes on the Canadian International since he won at Haydock, but for the moment we'll keep all our options open".

Jukebox Jury was moved up to Group 1 level when he was sent to Germany for the Preis von Europa over 2400 metres at Cologne on 27 September in which he again faced older opponents. He was made joint-favourite with the Sheema Classic winner Eastern Anthem just ahead of the Hardwicke Stakes winner Bronze Cannon with the best of the others appearing to be Toughness Danon (Furstenberg-Rennen), Enroller (John Porter Stakes) and Eliot (fourth in the German Derby). The colt started quickly before settling in second place behind Enroller and then went to the front 400 metres from the finish. Eastern Anthem produced a sustained effort but Jukebox Jury prevailed by a nose with a gap of two and a half lengths back to Eliot in third place.

For his final run of the season, as Johnston had predicted, Jukebox Jury was sent to Canada for the Pattison Canadian International at Woodbine Racetrack on 17 October. Ridden as usual by Ffrench he raced in second place before taking the lead in the straight but was overtaken in the final strides and beaten half a length by the six-year-old Champs Elysees.

In the 2009 World Thoroughbred Rankings, Jukebox Jury was given a rating of 118, making him the 87th best racehorse in the world and the best British three-year-old colt in the Long-distance division.

=== 2010: four-year-old season ===
In early 2010, Jukebox Jury was sent to Dubai for the Sheema Classic at Meydan Racecourse on 27 March in which he finished fifteenth of the sixteen runners behind Dar Re Mi after fading badly in the straight. On his return to Europe he contested the Jockey Club Stakes over one and a half miles at Newmarket Racecourse on 1 May and started the 13/8 favourite against four opponents, namely Claremont (Prix du Lys), Nanton (Mallard Stakes), Drill Sergeant (Duke of Edinburgh Stakes) and Halicarnassus (Bosphorus Cup). After racing in second place behind Drill Sergeant, Ffrench sent Jukebox Jury to the front with half a mile left and the colt kept on well to win by almost four lengths from Nanton.

Jukebox Jury was well beaten in his next two races, finishing seventh to Fame and Glory in the Coronation Cup and ninth to Harbinger in the Hardwicke Stakes. When sent to Germany for the Deutschland Preis at Hamburg on 17 July he produced a better effort as he finished fourth to Campanologist, beaten less than a length by the winner.

The 2010 World Thoroughbred Rankings saw Jukebox Jury drop to 178 in the rankings with a mark of 116.

=== 2011: five-year-old season ===
After an absence of more than eleven months, Jukebox Jury returned in the Listed Fred Archer Stakes at Newmarket on 25 June in which he was ridden for the first time by Neil Callan. The Grand Prix de Paris winner Cavalryman started favourite with Jukebox Jury starting at odds of 11/2 in an eight-runner field which also included Allied Powers (Grand Prix de Chantilly) and Afsare (Hampton Court Stakes). In a change of tactics, he led from the start and stayed to win by three-quarters of a length from Cavalryman and Afsare who dead-heated for second place.

In the Glorious Stakes at Goodwood Racecourse a month later, Jukebox Jury partially recovered after being boxed against the inside rail to finish third, beaten a head and a neck by Drunken Sailor and Harris Tweed. In an exceptionally strong renewal of the Prix Kergorlay over 3000 metres at Deauville on 21 August, he started at odds of 5/1 in a thirteen-runner field which included Americain, Dunaden, Red Cadeaux, Kasbah Bliss, Gentoo (Prix du Cadran, Prix Royal Oak), Brigantin (Prix de Lutèce) and Manighar (Prix Chaudenay). Jukebox Jury led from the start, switched left in the straight and drew away from his rivals to win by three lengths from Kasbah Bliss. Johnston commented "The plan was to make the pace, he set a strong one and kicked off the bend. He loves it here" while Callan added, "The horse is very adaptable and I just let him bowl along in front, he enjoyed it when I let him do it when he won first-time-out this season."

The Irish St Leger at the Curragh on 10 September attracted a field of six runners and Jukebox Jury, ridden by Johnny Murtagh started 4/1 second choice in the betting behind the odds-on favourite Fame and Glory. The other four runners were Duncan, Red Cadeaux, Fictional Account (Irish St Leger Trial Stakes) and the 100/1 outsider Waydownsouth. Jukebox Jury led from the start and appeared to be dominating the race before Duncan (ridden by Eddie Ahern) moved up alongside him in the straight. The two horses raced head to head in the last quarter mile and crossed the line together. After examining the photo finish, the racecourse judges declared a dead heat.

On his final appearance of the season the horse was sent to Australia to contest the Melbourne Cup over 3200 metres at Flemington Racecourse on 1 November. Before the race a share in the horse was acquired by the Australian owners Kevin Bamford, Colleen Bamford and Gerry Ryan. Carrying a weight of 126 pounds (the second highest in the race) he finished in 20th place in the 23 runner field having sustained a hairline fracture to the cannon bone of his left foreleg.

Jukebox Jury remained in training in 2012 but suffered another setback and was retired from racing in September.

== Stud career ==
At the end of his racing career, Jukebox Jury became a breeding stallion at the Gestut Etzean near Beerfelden in Germany. In December 2017 he moved to stand at Burgage Stud in Leighlinbridge, Ireland. He had his first Grade 1 winner just 3 months later at the Cheltenham festival when Farclas won the Triumph Hurdle for Gordon Elliot.He continues to be a popular and successful National Hunt sire.

== Pedigree ==
Pedigree of Jukebox Jury (IRE), grey stallion, 2006
Sire Montjeu (IRE) 1996	Sadler's Wells (USA); 1981	Northern Dancer	Nearctic
Sire Montjeu (IRE) 1996	Sadler's Wells (USA); 1981	Northern Dancer	Natalma
Sire Montjeu (IRE) 1996	Sadler's Wells (USA); 1981	Fairy Bridge	Bold Reason
Sire Montjeu (IRE) 1996	Sadler's Wells (USA); 1981	Fairy Bridge	Special
Sire Montjeu (IRE) 1996	Floripedes (FR); 1985	Top Ville	High Top
Sire Montjeu (IRE) 1996	Floripedes (FR); 1985	Top Ville	Sega Ville
Sire Montjeu (IRE) 1996	Floripedes (FR); 1985	Toute Cy	Tennyson
Sire Montjeu (IRE) 1996	Floripedes (FR); 1985	Toute Cy	Adele Toumignon
Dam Mare Aux Fees (GB) 1988	Kenmare (FR); 1975	Kalamoun	Zeddaan
Dam Mare Aux Fees (GB) 1988	Kenmare (FR); 1975	Kalamoun	Khairunissa
Dam Mare Aux Fees (GB) 1988	Kenmare (FR); 1975	Belle of Ireland	Milesian
Dam Mare Aux Fees (GB) 1988	Kenmare (FR); 1975	Belle of Ireland	Belle of the Ball
Dam Mare Aux Fees (GB) 1988	Feerie Boreale (FR); 1981	Irish River	Riverman
Dam Mare Aux Fees (GB) 1988	Feerie Boreale (FR); 1981	Irish River	Irish Star
Dam Mare Aux Fees (GB) 1988	Feerie Boreale (FR); 1981	Skelda	La Varende
Dam Mare Aux Fees (GB) 1988	Feerie Boreale (FR); 1981	Skelda	Fidra (Family: 22-a)
