= Lingfield Park Racecourse =

Horse racing venue in England

Coordinates: 51°10′14″N 0°0′18″W

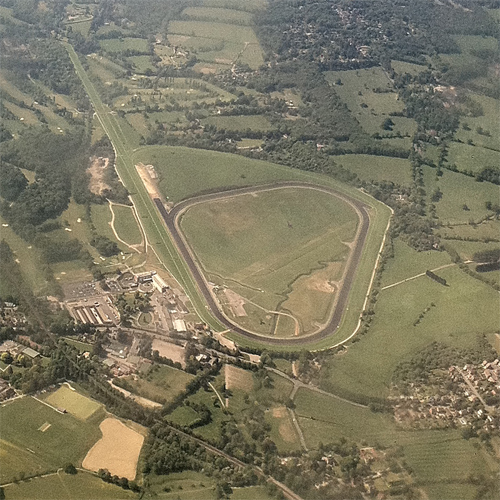
- Aerial view of Lingfield Park (May 2011)
- Interactive map of Lingfield Park Racecourse
- Location: Lingfield, Surrey
- Owned by: Arena Racing Company
- Screened on: Sky Sports Racing
- Course type: Flat; National Hunt

Lingfield Park Racecourse (commonly referred to as Lingfield) is a horse racing course at Lingfield in Surrey, United Kingdom. It is owned by the ARC Racing and Leisure Group, formerly Arena Leisure Plc.

Lingfield is best known as a winter all-weather flat racing course; the track is Polytrack, rather than the usual turf found in the UK. There are only five other all-weather courses in the UK, the others being at Southwell, Kempton, Wolverhampton, Newcastle, and Chelmsford City (formerly Great Leighs Racecourse). Lingfield also stages National Hunt and flat races on turf.

Lingfield railway station adjoins the course, served by trains from London to East Grinstead via Oxted.

== History ==
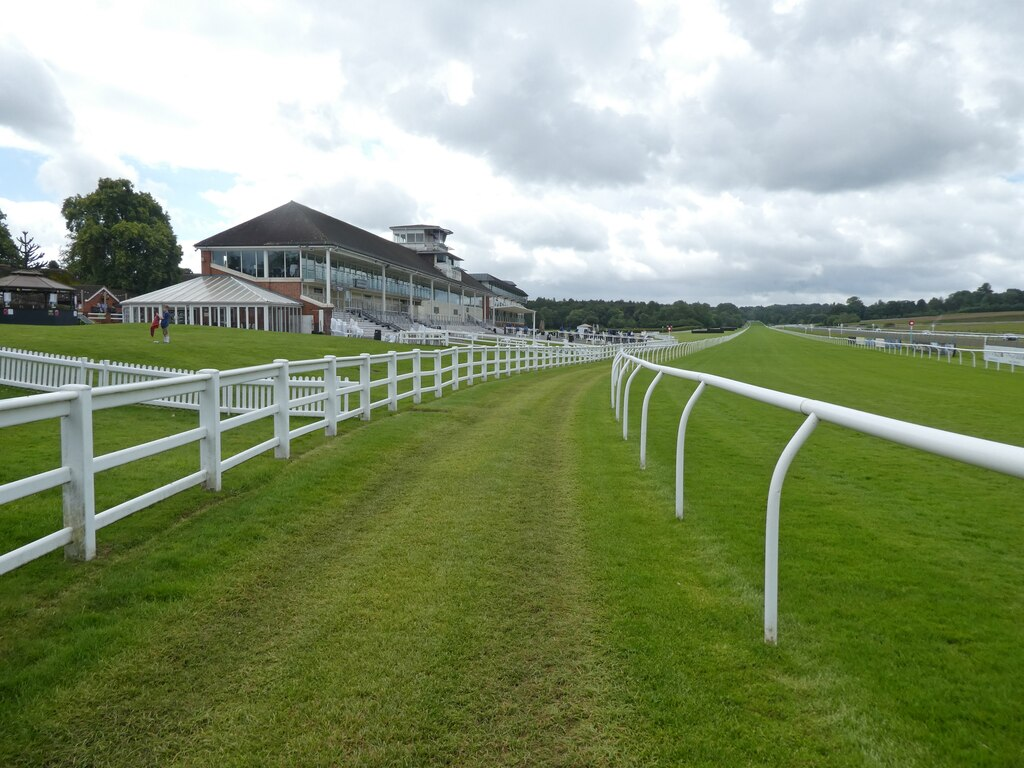
The stands

Lingfield Park racecourse is located in a 450-acre (1.8 km^{2}) estate and was opened in 1890 by the Prince of Wales (later Edward VII), who gave permission for the Prince of Wales' feathers to be incorporated into the course's official logo. The course initially held jumps racing only, but in 1894 the Jockey Club granted permission for flat racing to be held. Racing has been held continuously ever since, with the exception of the Second World War.

The War Office requisitioned the course during the Second World War and it was used as an internment camp, to detain civilians who were citizens of one of the Axis powers.

After the war, the racecourse returned to its pre-war owners, the Beckwith-Smith family. The racecourse was put up for sale by the family in 1974 at a price of £500,000. A few weeks later, it was sold to Ladbrokes. Ladbrokes sold the course in 1982 to Ron Muddle. The new owner installed flood defences on the estate to alleviate the flooding that had become a major problem in the years immediately after the war. A golf course was developed and this opened in June 1987.

Leisure Investments purchased the Lingfield Park from Muddle in 1988 and work to install an all-weather track on the inside of the turf course was completed in October 1989. The racecourse was sold again in 1991 to Arena Leisure three years later and replacement of the Equitrack all-weather surface with Polytrack, was completed in November of the same year. Other recent developments have been the re-laying of the back straight on the turf course in 2002/2003 and the construction of a £5.5 million grandstand in 2004. In early 2009 the course had another record broken as Matsunosuke became the highest rated horse to win on the all-weather surface rated 112 or 117 by Racing Post rating.

In addition, there's now a Marriott hotel based on the racecourse.

The racecourse is featured in the 1954 film The Rainbow Jacket.

== Notable races ==
| Month | DOW | Race Name | Type | Grade | Distance | Age/Sex |
|---|---|---|---|---|---|---|
| February | Sunday | Kachy Stakes | A W Flat | Listed | 6f 1y | 4yo + |
| February | Sunday | Tandridge Stakes | A W Flat | Listed | 1m 1y | 4yo + |
| February | Saturday | Hever Sprint Stakes | A W Flat | Listed | 5f 6y | 4yo + |
| February | Saturday | Winter Derby | A W Flat | Group 3 | 1m 2y | 4yo + |
| March | Thursday | Spring Cup | A W Flat | Listed | 7f | 3yo |
| May | Saturday | Chartwell Fillies' Stakes | Flat | Group 3 | 7f | 3yo + f |
| May | Saturday | Lingfield Oaks Trial | Flat | Listed | 1m 3f 106y | 3yo only f |
| May | Saturday | Lingfield Derby Trial | Flat | Listed | 1m 3f 106y | 3yo only c&g |

Other races

- Fleur De Lys Fillies' Stakes
- Quebec Stakes
- River Eden Fillies' Stakes
- All Weather Championship Series
