= Royston Ffrench =

British professional flat jockey (born 1975)

Personal information
- Born: 5 September 1975 (age 51) Telford, Shropshire, United Kingdom
- Occupation: Jockey
- Website: http://www.roystonffrench.com/

Horse racing career
- Sport: Horse racing

Major racing wins
- Preis von Europa (2009); Dubai Duty Free Turf (2010); Deutsches Derby (2010)

Racing awards
- British Champion Apprentice Jockey (1997)

Significant horses
- Jukebox Jury, Al Shemali, Buzzword

Royston Ffrench (born 5 September 1975) is a professional flat jockey. He was the 1997 British Champion Apprentice Jockey and has won multiple Grade 1 races in Europe and the Middle East.

== Early life ==
Ffrench was bought up in Telford, and is the son of a Jamaican migrant. He is one of 15 siblings. He credits his uncle for getting him into horse racing, as Ffrench spent his teenage years working in a factory and valeting cars.

== Racing career ==
Ffrench joined the British Racing School course in Newmarket in 1995. Ffrench was apprentice to Luca Cumani, and had his first public race ride in October 1995 before a first winner at Doncaster in March 1996. He won the 1996 Cesarewitch onboard Inchcailoch. His first Group win, the St. Simon Stakes at Newbury, came in 1997 riding Kaliana for Cumani and owner HH Aga Khan IV. That year, Ffrench would be crowned Champion Apprentice Jockey. Ffrench was one of three Champion Apprentice's who had worked with Cumani, the other two being Frankie Dettori and Jason Weaver.

Ffrench continued riding in the UK, but also further afield in the United Arab Emirates and Germany. In 2005, he was appointed lead jockey for trainer Howard Johnson and prolific owner Graham Wylie. His first Group 1 victory came in September 2009, when he won the Preis von Europa onboard Jukebox Jury. Ffrench had a successful winning partnership with the horse, having securing the Group 3 Rose of Lancaster Stakes and Group 2 Grand Prix de Deauville just weeks prior. The following year, Jukebox Jury and Ffrench would win the Group 2 Jockey Club Stakes at Newmarket.

In March 2010, whilst riding in Dubai, Ffrench scored another Group 1 success steering Al Shemali to victory in the Dubai Duty Free at odds of 40/1. In July, he partnered Buzzword to victory in the Group 1 Deutsches Derby at Hamburg for Godolphin.

Ffrench continues to ride in the UK during the summer flat season, and the UAE during the winter season. In July 2018, he was involved in a fall on the flat whilst competing in the Group 3 Jebel Ali Mile which saw him out of action for seven months.

== Major wins ==
Germany

- Preis von Europa - Jukebox Jury (2009)
- Deutsches Derby - Buzzword (2010)

United Arab Emirates

- Dubai Duty Free - Al Shemali (2010)
