= George Boughey =

British racehorse trainer (born 1992)

Personal information
- Born: 1992 (age 33–34) Dorset, England
- Occupation: Racehorse trainer

Horse racing career
- Sport: Horse racing

Major racing wins
- British Classic Races; 2000 Guineas (2026); 1000 Guineas (2022)

Significant horses
- Oscula, Cachet, Via Sistina, Believing, Bow Echo

George Boughey (born 1992) is a British racehorse trainer based in Newmarket who has won two British Classic Races.

== Background ==
Boughey grew up on a farm at Piddletrenthide in Dorset with his parents, two sisters and a younger brother. His father, James Richard Boughey, heir presumptive to the Boughey baronetcy, is a racehorse owner and member of the Jockey Club, having formerly been high sheriff of Dorset and director of Wincanton Racecourse. After attending Radley College, Boughey studied business management and agriculture at Newcastle University but preferred to spend his time with bloodstock agents in Newmarket and left after two years to take up a job in Australia with trainer Gai Waterhouse. Returning to England in 2013, he became assistant trainer to Hugo Palmer in Newmarket.

== Career as a trainer ==
In July 2019, after six years working for Hugo Palmer, Boughey obtained a licence to train on his own account, starting out with four horses in a barn leased in Red House Stables on the Hamilton Road. By mid-September he had eleven horses and had saddled two winners. He saddled his first Group racewinner two years later, when Oscula won the Group 3 Prix Six Perfections at Deauville in France. On 1 May 2022, he secured his first Group 1 and first British Classic win when Cachet, ridden by James Doyle won the 1000 Guineas. Six weeks later, Boughey saddled his first Royal Ascot winner with Inver Park in the Buckingham Palace Stakes. By this time, Boughey had more than 100 horses in Saffron House Stables on the Hamilton Road. In 2025, he purchased Craven House and Shadowfax Stables on the Hamilton Road from Godolphin. He achieved his second British Classic win on 2 May 2026 when Bow Echo, ridden by Billy Loughnane, won the 2000 Guineas. Bow Echo went on to win the St James's Palace Stakes and the Sussex Stakes, a feat not achieved since Henry Cecil saddled Frankel to win the three races in 2011. At the end of the 2026 season, Boughey's stable jockey Billy Loughnane and apprentice Jack Callan won their respective championships.

== Personal life ==
Boughey's partner is Laura Toller, daughter of retired Newmarket trainer James Toller.

== Major wins ==
(United Kingdom) Great Britain

- 1000 Guineas – (1) - Cachet (2022)
- 2000 Guineas – (1) - Bow Echo (2026)
- Pretty Polly Stakes - (1) - Via Sistina (2023)
- St James's Palace Stakes - (1) - Bow Echo (2026)
- Sussex Stakes - (1) - Bow Echo (2026)

United Arab Emirates

- Al Quoz Sprint - (1) - Believing (2025)

United States

- Christophe Clement Turf Stakes - Survie (2026)
- Breeders' Cup Juvenile Turf Sprint - Libertango (2026)
