= Billy Loughnane =

Irish jockey

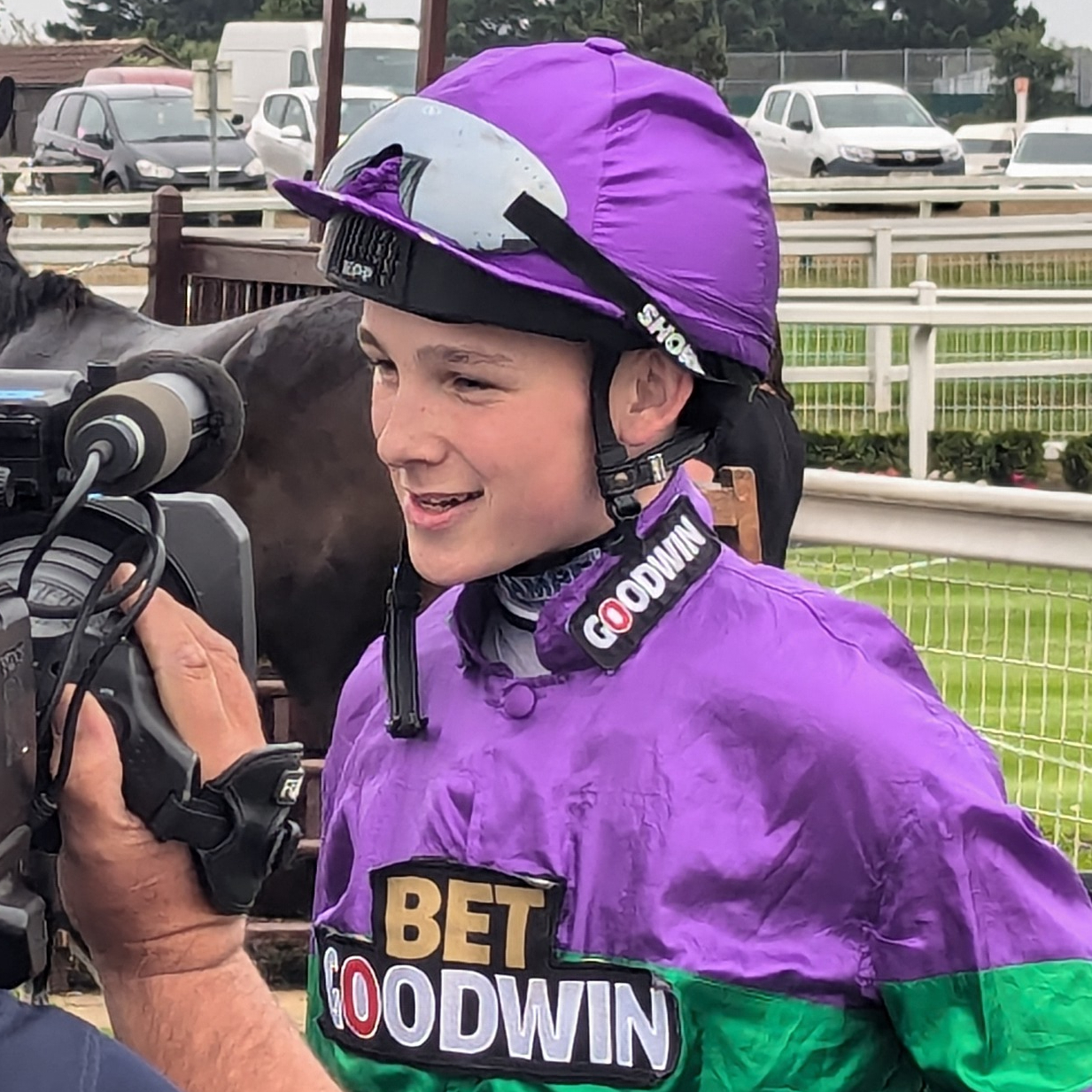
- Billy Loughnane at Great Yarmouth Racecourse in 2024

Personal information
- Born: March 2006 (age 20) Ireland
- Occupation: Jockey

Horse racing career
- Sport: Horse racing

Major racing wins
- Grosser Preis von Berlin (2025); 2000 Guineas Stakes (2026); St James's Palace Stakes (2026); July Cup (2026); Sussex Stakes (2026); Breeders' Cup Juvenile Turf Sprint (2026)

Racing awards
- British All-Weather Champion Apprentice (2022–23, 2023–24); British flat racing Champion Apprentice (2023); British All-Weather Champion Jockey (2024–25); British flat racing Champion Jockey (2026)

Significant horses
- Bow Echo

Billy Loughnane (born March 2006) is an Irish jockey who is based in Britain and competes in flat racing. He was the 2023 British flat racing Champion Apprentice, twice British All-Weather Champion Apprentice (2022–23 and 2023–24), and British All-Weather Champion Jockey (2024–25). In 2026 he won his first British Classic race and became the youngest British flat racing Champion Jockey since 1924.

== Background ==
Loughnane is the son of Clare and Daniel Mark Loughnane, an Irish trainer based in England. Born in Ireland, Loughnane moved to England with his parents and brother Jack at the end of 2011, living first in Staffordshire and then, from 2017, at a new training yard, Rock Farm, near Kidderminster in Worcestershire.

Loughnane started riding out for his father when he was still at school and also rode on the pony racing circuit, winning the all-weather championship in 2022. He always wanted to be a jockey and went to school dressed as a jockey when asked to dress as what he wanted to be when he was older.

== Career ==
=== Apprentice jockey ===
Loughnane took out an apprentice licence after leaving school aged sixteen and had his first ride in October 2022 on Starfighter, trained by his father, at Newcastle. His first winner was another horse trained by his father, Swiss Rowe, at Wolverhampton on 28 November 2022. In April 2023 he was crowned champion all-weather apprentice with 41 winners, in spite of taking a break in February to ride out with trainer David Meah in Miami. On 1 April 2023, on just his third ride on the turf, he rode Doddie's Impact, trained by Robyn Brisland, to victory in the Brocklesby Stakes at Doncaster. The following month he became the youngest jockey since Lester Piggott in 1951 to ride in a British classic when he partnered Sweet Harmony in the 1000 Guineas at Newmarket. The 200/1 outsider, trained by Richard Spencer, finished 14th of 20 runners. He had eight rides in his first Royal Ascot, with his best result being second place on Calling the Wind, trained by Richard Hughes, in the Ascot Stakes. He rode out his claim with his 95th winner on 8 September 2023, having had to take three weeks out after injuring his thumb in July in the stalls at Nottingham. On 1 October he won the Apprentices' Derby at Epsom on the favourite Forceful Speed, trained by George Boughey. At the end of the month was crowned as 2023 Champion Apprentice on Champions' Day at Ascot. He retained his all-weather apprentice title in April 2024.

=== Professional jockey ===
Loughnane secured his first Group race victory when he rode Queues Likely, trained by Stan Moore, in the Group 3 Preis Karin Baronin von Ullman Schwarzgold-Rennen at Cologne in Germany on 21 April 2024. On 18 June 2024 he achieved his first win at Royal Ascot and his first British Group win, riding the 80/1 outsider Rashabar to a photo-finish victory in the Group 2 Coventry Stakes for trainer Brian Meehan. This was followed three days later by a win on Soprano for George Boughey in the Sandringham Stakes.

In April 2025, Loughnane was crowned British All-Weather Champion Jockey with 75 wins, in spite of having spent some time in Australia over the winter. He achieved his first Group 1 success in August 2025, winning the Grosser Preis von Berlin on Rebel's Romance, trained by Charlie Appleby, in the Godolphin silks. In October 2025, he won the Cesarewitch Handicap on Beylerbeyi at Newmarket. In 2025 he set a 21st-century record of 222 wins in a calendar year, riding the record-setting winner on the final day of the year.

Loughnane secured his first British Group 1 and first British Classic on 2 May 2026, when Bow Echo won the 2000 Guineas at Newmarket for trainer George Boughey. Bow Echo started at 9/2 third favourite and finished two-and-three-quarters lengths ahead of joint favourite Gstaad, with the other joint favourite Distant Storm a further eight lengths behind in third place. After the race, Loughnane said: "To be competing in these races is what you want and to find a horse like this at 20 years old is a dream come true. I can't put it into words, I've never had a feeling like that in my life." Bow Echo went on to provide Loughnane with two further Group 1 wins in the St James's Palace Stakes and the Sussex Stakes. In October 2026, Loughnane became the youngest British flat racing Champion Jockey for 102 years.

On 30 October, Loughnane achieved his first Breeders' Cup win, riding Libertango for George Boughey in the Breeders' Cup Juvenile Turf Sprint. The ride had been given to Flavien Prat as Libertango's weight was below Loughnane's minimum riding weight. It was only 45 minutes before the race that he was, after a session in the sauna, able to meet the weight and take the ride. The following week it was announced that Loughnane had been appointed as a retained rider for owners Godolphin.

== Major wins ==
(United Kingdom) Great Britain

- 2000 Guineas Stakes - (1) - Bow Echo (2026)
- St James's Palace Stakes - (1) - Bow Echo (2026)
- Sussex Stakes - (1) - Bow Echo (2026)
- July Cup - (1) - Comanche Brave (2026)

(Republic of Ireland) Ireland

- Flying Five Stakes – (1) – Comanche Brave (2026)

Germany

- Grosser Preis von Berlin - (1) - Rebel's Romance (2025)

United States

- Breeders' Cup Juvenile Turf Sprint - (1) - Libertango (2026)
