= Luca Cumani =

Italian racehorse trainer

- Born: 7 April 1949 (age 77); Milan, Italy
- Occupation: Racehorse trainer

Luca Matteo Cumani (born 7 April 1949) is an Italian thoroughbred horse trainer and breeder. He trained at Bedford House Stables in Newmarket, England from 1976 to 2019. He has trained a multitude of high-profile horses, including seven Classic race winners, two Epsom Derby winners in Kahyasi (1988) and High-Rise (1998), as well as a Breeders' Cup Mile winner in Barathea (1994).

== Early life and family ==
Cumani was born on 7 April 1949, in Milan, Italy. As the son of champion amateur jockey Elena and champion trainer Sergio Cumani, horseracing has always been in his blood. He followed in their footsteps, emulating first his mother and then his father.

Cumani is the father of Francesca Cumani who is the co-presenter of ITV's racing coverage in the UK.

Cumani’s son Matt Cumani is a racehorse trainer himself, based in Ballarat, Victoria, Australia. He appears to have a similar desire as his father to target the classics.

== Career ==
Realising that Newmarket is the centre of the racing world, Luca moved to England in his early twenties to work for ten-time champion trainer Henry Cecil.

It was not long before he started up his own training establishment at Bedford House. Within ten years he had 12 Group 1 winners in five countries and the tally has now risen to 55 until the present day. Not content with claiming the majority of the big domestic races, he has ventured far and wide with globetrotting champions such as Falbrav and Alkaased to win Group 1 races in Hong Kong and Japan, respectively.

Cumani has also earned a reputation as a mentor to jockeys and assistant trainers. Frankie Dettori, Jimmy Fortune, Jason Weaver, Royston Ffrench and Nicky Mackay are all previous Champion Apprentices who learnt their trade under his tutelage. Leading rider Kieren Fallon was formerly employed by Cumani, as was rider Kirsty Milczarek. Christophe Clement, James Toller, Jonathan Portman, Chris Wall, John Berry, David Simcock and Marco Botti are the best known current trainers that spent a portion of their formative years as assistant trainer to Cumani.

Since 1984 Cumani and his wife Sara have owned and managed the Fittocks Stud at Upend, producing many good horses including Milan, Magical Romance, Chicquita and Alexandrova.

In October 2018 Cumani announced that he would retire from training at the end of the year.

== Major wins ==
(United Kingdom) Great Britain

- Champion Stakes - (1) - Legal Case (1989)
- Cheveley Park Stakes - (1) - Embla (1985)
- Derby - (2) - Kahyasi (1988), High-Rise (1998)
- Eclipse Stakes - (1) - Falbrav (2003)
- Fillies' Mile - (3) - Shamshir (1990), Glorosia (1997), Gossamer (2001)
- International Stakes - (3) - Commanche Run (1985), One So Wonderful (1998), Falbrav (2003)
- King George VI and Queen Elizabeth Stakes - (1) - Postponed (2015)
- Lockinge Stakes - (1) - Then Again (1987)
- Nassau Stakes - (1) - Free Guest (1985)
- Queen Anne Stakes - (3) - Then Again (1987), Markofdistinction (1990), Barathea (1994)
- Queen Elizabeth II Stakes - (3) - Markofdistinction (1990), Falbrav (2003), Starcraft (2005)
- St. James's Palace Stakes - (2) - Bairn (1985), Half a Year (1987)
- St. Leger - (1) - Commanche Run (1984)
- Sun Chariot Stakes - (6) - Free Guest (1984, 1985), Infamy (1987), Red Slippers (1992), One So Wonderful (1997), Kissogram (1998)
- Sussex Stakes - (1) - Second Set (1991)
- Yorkshire Oaks - (2) - Only Royale (1993, 1994)

Canada

- Canadian International Stakes - (1) - Infamy (1988)
- E. P. Taylor Stakes - (2) - Sudden Love (1988), Zomaradah (1998)

(Emirate of Dubai) Dubai

- Dubai Duty Free - (1) - Presvis (2011)

France

- Grand Prix de Saint-Cloud - (1) - Alkaased (2005)
- Prix d'Ispahan - (1) - Falbrav (2003)
- Prix du Moulin de Longchamp - (1) - Starcraft (2005)
- Prix Royal-Oak - (1) - Old Country (1983)

Germany

- Grosser Preis von Berlin - (1) - Second Step (2015)

Hong Kong

- Hong Kong Cup - (1) - Falbrav (2003)
- Queen Elizabeth II Cup - (1) - Presvis (2009)

(Republic of Ireland) Ireland

- Irish 1,000 Guineas - (2) - Ensconse (1989), Gossamer (2002)
- Irish 2,000 Guineas - (1) - Barathea (1993)
- Irish Champion Stakes - (1) - Commanche Run (1985)
- Irish Derby - (1) - Kahyasi (1988)

Italy

- Derby Italiano - (1) - Old Country (1982)
- Gran Premio d'Italia - (3) - Masad (1992), Jaunty Jack (1997), Clapham Common (1998)
- Gran Premio di Milano - (1) - Endless Hall (2000)
- Oaks d'Italia - (2) - Zomaradah (1998), Contredanse (2010)
- Premio Lydia Tesio - (3) - Papering (1997), Zomaradah (1999), God Given (2018)
- Premio Roma - (2) - Old Country (1985), Legal Case (1990)

Japan

- Japan Cup - (1) - Alkaased (2005)

Singapore

- Singapore Airlines International Cup - (1) - Endless Hall (2001)

United States

- Arlington Million - (1) - Tolomeo (1983)
- Breeders' Cup Mile - (1) - Barathea (1994)
