= List of presidents of Murray Edwards College, Cambridge =

This article lists those who have served as President of Murray Edwards College, Cambridge (previously known as New Hall, Cambridge) since its foundation in 1954.

== Presidents of New Hall, Cambridge ==
- 1954–1981 Dame Rosemary Murray
- 1981–1995 Valerie Pearl
- 1995–1996 Zara Steiner (acting)
- 1996–2008 Anne Lonsdale

Zara Steiner served as Acting President between the retirement of Valerie Pearl in September 1995 and the appointment of Anne Lonsdale in January 1996.

== Presidents of Murray Edwards College, Cambridge ==
- 2008–2012: Jennifer Barnes
- 2012–2013: Ruth Lynden-Bell (acting)
- 2013–2021: Barbara Stocking
- 2021–2025: Dorothy Byrne
- 2025–present: Rachel Polonsky (acting)
