= The Women's Art Collection =

Modern art museum in Cambridge, England

Coordinates: 52.2142°N 0.1085°E

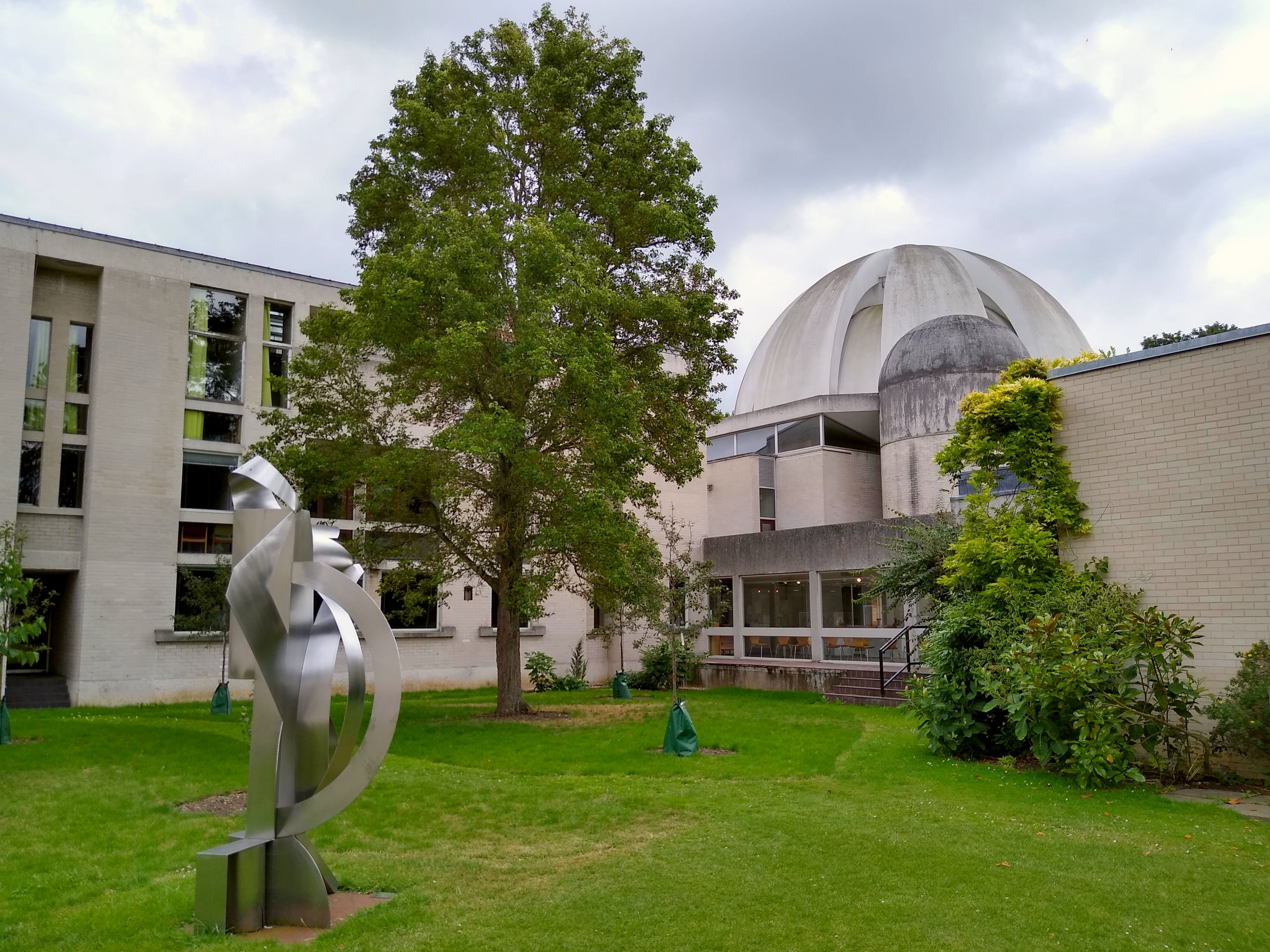
Naomi Press's Improvisation with the dome at Murray Edwards College behind

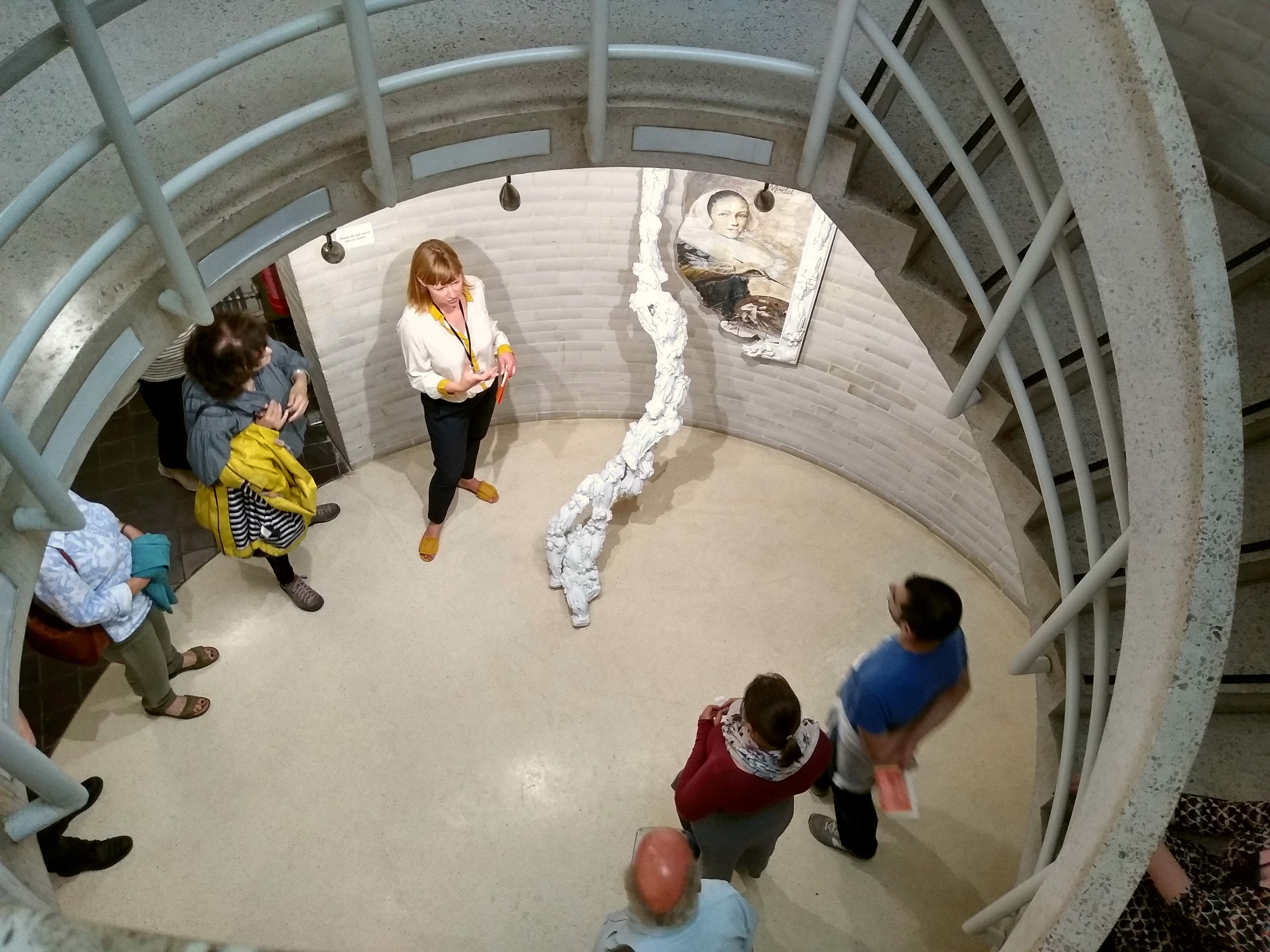
The Women's Art Collection Curator Harriet Loffler describing Rose Garrard's Models Triptych: Madonna Cascade

The Women's Art Collection (before 2022, the New Hall Art Collection) is a permanent collection of modern and contemporary art by women artists, at Murray Edwards College, Cambridge (previously New Hall), England.

It includes over 600 works by artists of international renown and is now considered to be one of the largest and most significant collections of contemporary art by women in the world. Paintings, prints, and sculpture are displayed throughout Murray Edwards College in Cambridge. The College has a designated gallery corridor for temporary exhibitions and the works are displayed throughout its buildings and grounds. The modernist College buildings were completed in 1965 by Chamberlin, Powell and Bon and are Grade II* listed. Many of the works are on display to visitors and a self-guided tour is available from the Porters' Lodge.

The aim of the Women’s Art Collection is "to champion artists who identify as women, to give them visibility and a voice, and promote their work within the ethos of an academic college for women dedicated to gender equality."

== History ==
The Collection has come about as the result of many gifts and loans from artists and donors. The Collection started in 1986 with the purchase of Mary Kelly's Extase (thanks to the generous support of the Eastern Arts Association and the artist herself) following her stay as artist in residence. This spurred the hope that the College might develop a permanent collection of 20th-century art by women, to inspire the female students who would live among it. In 1992, Valerie Pearl, the President of New Hall, wrote to 100 of the leading women artists in Britain and received some 75 donations in return. The collection continues to acquire works by gifts and loans from artists and alumnae. It is the largest collection of art by women in Europe and about 95 per cent of it is displayed.

On 7 March 2018, the New Hall Art Collection received accreditation from the Arts Council England which recognised the quality of the collection and the professionalism with which it was managed.

Until April 2022, the Collection was known as the New Hall Art Collection in recognition of the College's name before 2008.

== Collection ==
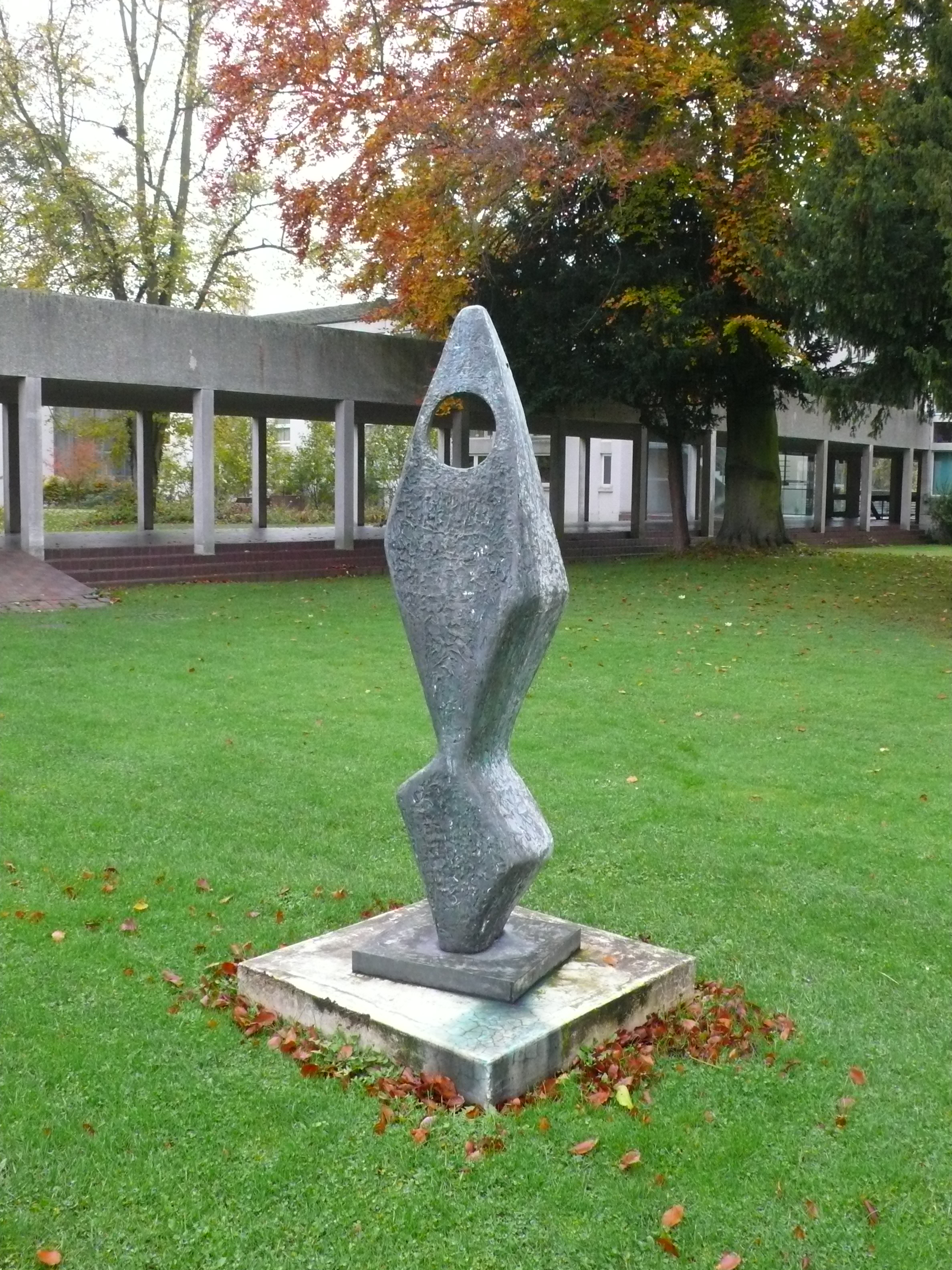
Barbara Hepworth's Ascending Form (Gloria) at Murray Edwards College

The collection includes works by:

- Sandra Blow
- Judy Chicago
- Tracey Emin
- Mary Fedden
- Oona Grimes
- Maggi Hambling
- Lubaina Himid
- Susie Hamilton
- Barbara Hepworth
- Nicola Hicks
- Vanessa Jackson
- Lucy Jones
- Zelda Nolte
- Cornelia Parker
- Emily Patrick
- Gwen Raverat
- Paula Rego
- Julia Sorrell
- Wendy Taylor

== Debate ==
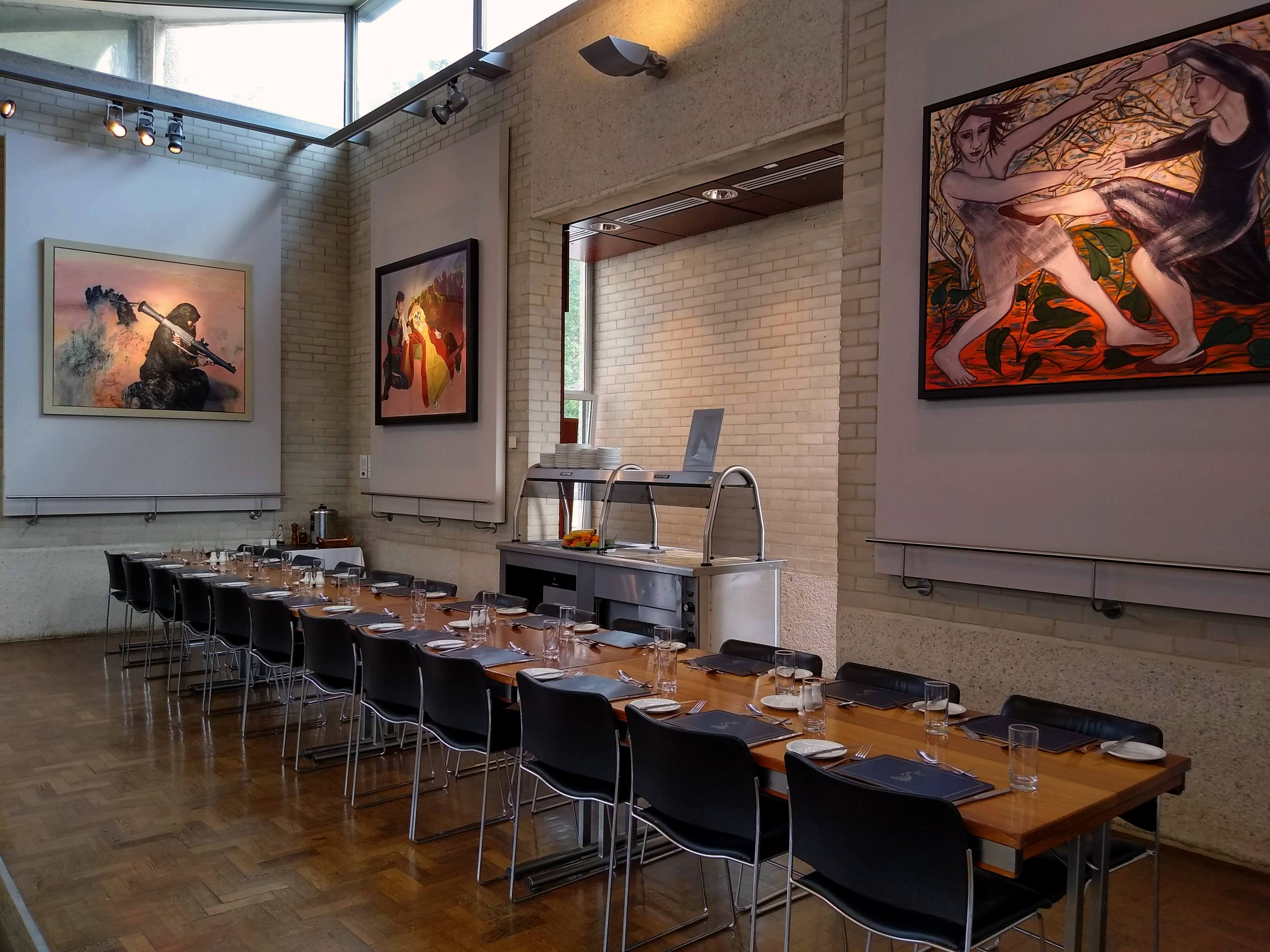
Gulf Women Prepare for War (far left) and other paintings hung over high table

In 2005, Maggi Hambling's painting Gulf Women Prepare for War (1986) was covered on request of a US Navy officer as a condition of a private booking for the US military. The painting depicts a woman dressed in a hijab and armed with a rocket launcher. Hambling was reported to be appalled with its censorship. Students and tutors staged a peaceful protest during after-dinner speeches.

== See also ==
- List of 20th century women artists
