= Zoah Hedges-Stocks =

English journalist

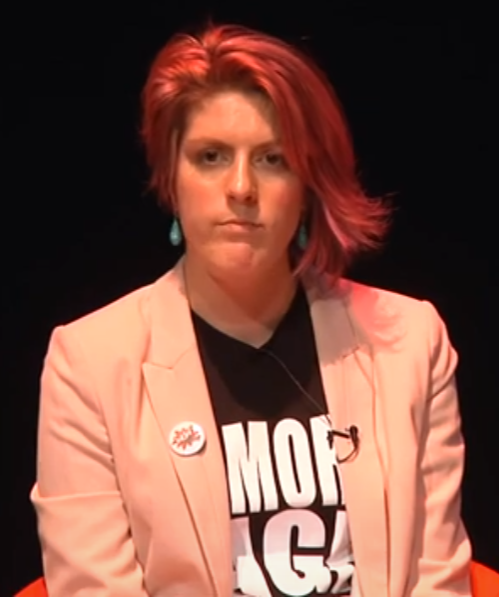
- In a panel discussion on International Women's Day 2015
- Education: Murray Edwards College, University of Cambridge
- Occupation: journalist

Zoah Hedges-Stocks is an English journalist who became the first travelling showman to study at and graduate from the University of Cambridge.

== Biography ==
Hedges-Stocks was born into a Suffolk family of travelling showmen, who have worked on fairgrounds since the 1800s. As a child she worked on the dodgems and candy floss stalls of the family fair during the summer season and lived at Leiston, near Aldeburgh, in the winter.

Despite having disrupted schooldays Hedges-Stocks achieved two As and a B in her A-Levels. Hedges-Stocks matriculated to Murray Edwards College at the University of Cambridge in 2010. She studied History and achieved a first class degree. During her studies, she edited The Cambridge Student newspaper.

Hedges-Stocks has commented that: "Among travelling showmen it's often felt that education isn't that relevant, you know what you're going to do – settle down with a nice traveller boy and work on the fairs. A lot of people in my community didn't understand the application process was selective – they assumed you could walk in. This wasn't to do with ignorance it's just not really part of our world. People were interested as it was something new and exciting."

Her story attracted coverage in the national press and on BBC Radio 4's Woman's Hour. In January 2014, she began a journalism training course with the Press Association. She now works as a freelance journalist, writing for the Barking and Dagenham Post, The Independent, Newnham Recorder, and The Telegraph, among other local and national publications.

She has used her platform as a journalist and Cambridge alumnus to criticise Murray Edwards President, Dorothy Byrne, who planned in 2021 to introduce a series of seminars to teach women about their fertility in response to the falling national birth rate. Also in 2021, she went viral on Twitter after people misinterpreted her surname and approached her for financial advice, prompting her to tweet "this is not a finance account."
