= Richard Edgar-Wilson =

British singer

Richard Edgar-Wilson is an English tenor who has had an international career on the concert platform and the opera stage. He is particularly known for his oratorio work, especially as a Bach Evangelist and as an interpreter of the music of Benjamin Britten.

== Life and career ==
Richard Wilson (he changed his name on joining Equity to prevent any possible confusion with the well-known Scottish actor) was born in Ipswich, Suffolk. He attended Ipswich School and Christ's College, Cambridge, where he was a choral scholar and read history. He later won a postgraduate scholarship to the Royal College of Music where he studied with Edward Brooks and Alasdair Graham.

Early singing engagements included concerts and recordings with the Consort of Musicke, the Tallis Scholars, the Deller Consort, Combattimento and the Scholars.

Since 1989 when he began working exclusively as a soloist he has sung in over thirty countries collaborating with many conductors including Sir Roger Norrington, Trevor Pinnock, Raymond Leppard, Sir Neville Marriner, Thierry Fischer, Jeffrey Tate, Philippe Herreweghe and Sir Charles Mackerras and with orchestras such as Academy of St Martin in the Fields, Le Concert Spirituel, Scottish Chamber Orchestra, CBSO, English Chamber Orchestra, Les Musiciens du Louvre and the Orchestra of the Age of Enlightenment.

Opera appearances include Acis (Canada and London), Tamino (Portugal and New Zealand), Don Ottavio (Lisbon), Thespis/Mercure (Platée) at the Palais Garnier, Gonsalve (L’Heure Espagnole) for Grange Park Opera and Death in Venice for ENO, La Monnaie, the Amsterdam Concertgebouw and La Scala, Milan.

In recital, Edgar-Wilson has performed with Graham Johnson and the Songmakers' Almanac, and with Malcolm Martineau, Eugene Asti, Iain Burnside, Roger Vignoles and Julius Drake.

He won a Gramophone Award for Stradella San Giovanni Battista with Les Musiciens du Louvre/Minkowski and his many solo recordings include Coates Songs with Sir Thomas Allen and the BBC Concert Orchestra, Messiah, Mozart Requiem, Die Schöne Müllerin, and works by Arne, Monteverdi, Bach, Purcell, Boyce, Howard Blake and Bernard Herrmann amongst many others. Film and television work includes Beauty in the world premiere of Gerald Barry's The Triumph of Beauty and Deceit for Channel 4 TV and Radames in the award-winning Norwegian feature film Suffløsen.

Richard Edgar-Wilson is married to Dr Jennifer Barnes, Pro-Vice Chancellor (International Strategy) at the University of Cambridge and President of Murray Edwards College. They have a son and a daughter.

== Select discography ==
- Arne: Artaxerxes, with the Parley of Instruments, conducted by Roy Goodman, (Hyperion)
- Boyce: Ode for Saint Cecilia's Day / David's Lamentation over Saul and Jonathan, with the Hanover Band and the Choir of New College, Oxford, conducted by Graham Lea-Cox (Gaudeamus)
- Eric Coates: Songs accompanied by Eugene Asti – pianoforte (Marco Polo)
- Bernard Herrmann: Moby Dick, with the Danish Radio Symphony Orchestra and Concert Chorus, conducted by Michael Schønwandt (Chandos)
- Purcell: Dioclesian with The English Concert, conducted by Trevor Pinnock (Deutsche Grammophon Archiv)
- Stradella: San Giovanni Battista. Les Musiciens du Louvre, conducted by Marc Minkowski (Erato)
- Vaughan Williams: On Wenlock Edge, accompanied by the Coull String Quartet with James Lisney – pianoforte (SOMM)
