= John Wakeford =

Church of England clergyman

The Reverend John Wakeford (died 13 February 1930) was a Church of England clergyman who was convicted of adultery and deprived of his post as Archdeacon of Stow in a celebrated court case in 1921.

== Church career ==
Wakeford was the son of an employee of Plymouth dockyard. He took holy orders in 1884 at Exeter, and subsequently obtained a Bachelor of Divinity degree at the University of Durham. He served as Vicar of St Margaret's, Anfield, Liverpool from 1893; this appointment was at first difficult as Wakeford came from the high church tradition which was not the tradition of the diocese. He was promoted to be a prebendary at Lincoln Cathedral at the end of 1910. He became Archdeacon of Stow in July 1913.

== Scandal ==
In February 1921 Wakeford was convicted of charges under the Clergy Discipline Act 1892 (55 & 56 Vict. c. 32) that he had committed adultery at a hotel in Peterborough in March and April 1920. He appealed to the Judicial Committee of the Privy Council, which dismissed his appeal. As a result of his conviction he was deprived of the post of Archdeacon of Stow, but he was not removed from holy orders. Wakeford continued to dispute the finding, bringing proceedings for slander against the managing clerk of the Bishop of Lincoln's solicitors. As a result of the fight and his legal bills, he was bankrupted in 1924.

John Treherne investigated the details and background to the case in a 1987 book.

== Death ==
He was removed to Barming Heath Asylum on 6 March 1928, having suffered a breakdown, and died there on 13 February 1930.
