= Roma Gill =

British academic and literary scholar

Roma Gill - one of the 16 founding students of New Hall, Cambridge in 1954

Roma Gill OBE, M.A. Cantab., BLitt. Oxon. (29 September 1934 – 3 August 2001) was a British academic, writer and noted scholar on the works of Shakespeare and Marlowe. She edited more than 30 texts including three in the Oxford School Marlowe series and twenty-one in the Oxford School Shakespeare series, making these works more accessible to younger students. In addition, Gill was a prolific author of scholarly articles and reviews who during her prolific lecturing career inspired her many students with her passion for 16th-century literature. In her later life she developed multiple sclerosis which caused her great pain and disabled her to the extent she couldn't move and had to dictate the notes for her books.

== Early life ==
Gill was born in Keighley in Yorkshire where she attended Keighley Girls' Grammar School. She was coached by the teacher, poet and critic Philip Hobsbaum for scholarships to Newnham College, Cambridge and St Hilda's College, Oxford. Newnham considered that her examination answers were too similar to the views of the literary critic F. R. Leavis and did not offer her a place; she was offered a scholarship by St Hilda's but opted instead to become one of 16 founding scholars reading English at New Hall, Cambridge where during her first week she was profiled in Varsity, Cambridge University's main student newspaper. At Cambridge she became keenly interested in the theatre, playing Lady Macbeth in Macbeth for the University Actors Club. An enthusiastic horsewoman, Gill endured many falls leading to at least two incidences of concussion, which her friend Philip Hobsbaum believed may have contributed to her later illness.

== Academic career ==
On graduating from Cambridge Gill studied for the degree of BLitt on the works of Philip Massinger under Helen Gardner at St Hilda's College, Oxford (1957–59). Gill lectured at Ripon College of Education and Kesteven College of Education between 1959 and 1963. In 1960 at Kesteven she began to fall over, in 1965 being diagnosed with multiple sclerosis. From 1963 she taught at the University of Sheffield under William Empson. Here she was the only female lecturer in the department before becoming Reader in English Literature in 1979. Despite being in great pain and having limited mobility because of her illness, Gill travelled around the world, from Woolagong in Australia to Yaounde in Cameroon. Throughout this period Gill taught at summer schools at Oxford and Stratford-upon-Avon in addition to lecturing in New York, Berlin, New Orleans, Malta and Florida.

== Literary editor ==
Gill was known for her general editorship of the Oxford School Shakespeare series and for her editions of the works of Christopher Marlowe. She was general editor of the Oxford University Press Works (1987–98), for which she edited the first volume on the poems and translations. She also published editions of Marlowe's Doctor Faustus (1965) and Edward II (1967) in addition to a one-volume of Marlowe's complete plays (1971). She was a prominent member of The Marlowe Society of America, and since her death the Society has awarded the Roma Gill Prize every two years for the best new work in Marlowe studies.

== Later years ==
She retired from Sheffield in 1984 as her illness progressively worsened, and for a period she lived in Oxford, but having limited mobility - by now she was on crutches and struggled with the uneven pavements - she eventually made her home in Cambridge. By this time she only had the use of her left hand and was permanently in a wheelchair; she was thus forced to dictate notes to a voice-activated computer. She was appointed OBE in 1994 for services to literature, receiving her award from Elizabeth II at Buckingham Palace in her electric wheelchair.

Roma Gill died in Cambridge in 2001 aged 66.

Murray Edwards College, Cambridge, where Gill studied when it was New Hall, Cambridge, appoints a Roma Gill Fellow in English.

== Select publications ==
- (ed.), Women Beware Women, London: Ernest Benn (1968)
- (ed.), The Complete Works of Christopher Marlowe, Clarendon Press (1986) published in partnership with Oxford University Press
- (ed.), Doctor Faustus, Ernest Benn Limited, London (1965)
- (ed.), The Jew of Malta. The Complete Works of Christopher Marlowe (1995), IV. Oxford University Press.
- (ed.), William Empson: The Man and His Work, London & Boston : Routledge and Kegan Paul (1974)
- (ed.), Doctor Faustus, London : Ernest Benn (1965)
- (ed.), Edward II, London: Oxford University Press (1967)
- (ed.), The Plays of Christopher Marlowe, London: Oxford University Press (1971)
- (ed.), with Kenneth Friedenreich and Constance B. Kuriyama, A Poet and a Filthy Play-maker: new essays on Christopher Marlowe, New York: AMS Press (1988)
- (ed.), Othello, Oxford: Oxford University (1989)
- (ed.), Richard II, Oxford: Oxford University Press (1998)
- (ed.), Coriolanus, Oxford: Oxford University Press (1999)
- (ed.), Henry V, Oxford: Oxford University Press (1995)
- (ed.), Much Ado About Nothing, Oxford: Oxford University Press (1999)
- (ed.), Julius Caesar, Oxford: Oxford University Press (2001)
- (ed.), Romeo & Juliet, Oxford; New York: Oxford University Press (2005)
- (ed.), King Lear, Oxford: Oxford University Press (1994)
- (ed.), Measure for Measure, Oxford: Oxford University Press (2001)
- (ed.), Macbeth, Oxford: Oxford University Press (2001)
- (ed.), As You Like It, Oxford: Oxford University Press (1994)
- (ed.), Twelfth Night, Oxford: Oxford University Press (1986)
- (ed.), Hamlet, Oxford: Oxford University Press (1994)
- (ed.), The Merchant of Venice, Oxford: Oxford University Press (1994)
- (ed.), Antony and Cleopatra, Oxford: Oxford University Press (1997)
- (ed.), Henry IV Part I, Oxford: Oxford University Press (1984)
- (ed.), The Winter's Tale, Oxford: Oxford University Press (1996)
- (ed.), The Tempest, Oxford: Oxford University Press (1998)
- (ed.), Love's Labour's Lost, Oxford: Oxford University Press (2002)
- (ed.), A Midsummer Night's Dream, Oxford: Oxford University Press (1992)
- (ed.), The Taming of the Shrew, Oxford: Oxford University Press (1990)
