= Emily Patrick =

British artist

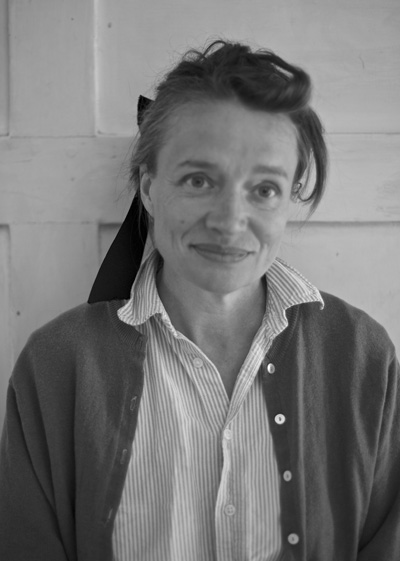
- Born: Emily Patrick
- Known for: Figurative painting

Emily Patrick (born 4 October 1959) is a British figurative painter.

== Biography ==
Patrick grew up on a sheep farm in Kent. She studied architecture at the Architectural Association and Cambridge University.

She paints in oil and tempera on gesso on wood. Her first solo exhibition at Thomas Agnew & Sons was the first in the gallery's history to sell out within three days.

In 1987, she was commissioned to paint Diana, Princess of Wales for the Royal Hampshire Regiment. In 1988 she exhibited as a finalist in the BP Portrait Award at the National Portrait Gallery and in 1989 she won the Carroll Foundation Award of the Royal Society of Portrait Painters for the most promising portrait by an artist under 30. Since 1995 she has exhibited independently every two to three years in London and New York.

Collections holding Patrick’s works include The Princess of Wales's Royal Regiment, the Women's Art Collection at Murray Edwards College, Cambridge, Winchester College, and the Royal College of Psychiatrists, and her portraits have included Lord Cottesloe, Emma Hope, Jonathan Bate, Mark Rylance, and Justo Gallego Martínez.

Patrick lives in Greenwich and is married to Michael Perry, who frames her paintings. They have three children.
