= Siân Griffiths =

British physician

Siân Meryl Griffiths CBE is a senior British public health physician who is an expert on global public health. She is best known for co-chairing the 2003 SARS Inquiry for the Hong Kong Government.

Griffiths was President of the UK Faculty of Public Health of the Royal College of Physicians from 2001 to 2004.

== Education ==
Griffiths read medicine at New Hall, Cambridge, matriculating in 1970.

She undertook clinical training at King's College Hospital in London and earned her master's degree in community medicine at London School of Hygiene and Tropical Medicine in 1982.

== Career ==
Griffiths has practised as a service based public health physician at local, regional and national level in the UK, and worked as a senior academic in Hong Kong. Completing public health training in 1985, she became a senior registrar in Hackney where she pioneered community health partnerships before moving to Oxford as a consultant in public health in 1998. In 1990, Griffiths became the youngest Regional Director of Public Health when she was appointed to South West Thames Region.

On reorganisation of London's health services, in 1993 she returned to Oxford as Oxfordshire's Director of Public Health. Whilst Co-Chair with Lord Hunt of Kings Heath, of the Association of Public Health, she co-founded the UK Public Health Association. A member of the Board of the Faculty of Public Health, Griffiths was elected President of the Faculty in 2001. Her term was defined by significant reshaping of public health to enhance the multidisciplinary nature of the profession. During this period, she was a non-executive member of the New Opportunities Fund, chairing the Healthy Living Centres and cancer committees (1998–2006), a member of the Health Protection Authority (2003–2005), and of the Postgraduate Medical Education and Training Board (2003–2005).

Griffiths was an adviser to the Department of Health on the Choosing Health White Paper and investigated the health of rough sleepers for Dame Louise Casey and the regulation of doctors for the GMC.

As President of the Faculty of Public Health, Griffiths was in Hong Kong in March 2003, when the SARS epidemic broke out. Quarantined on her return to the UK, Griffiths went on to co-chair, with Sir Cyril Chantler, the Hong Kong Government's SARS Inquiry. The SARS Inquiry Report resulted in a strengthening of disease surveillance in Hong Kong and southern China. In 2005, Griffiths was invited back to Hong Kong to take up the position of Director of the School of Public Health and Primary Care at the Chinese University of Hong Kong (CUHK). Over the next few years she developed new academic programmes for CUHK, including the first BSc in public health in Hong Kong, built educational and research links throughout mainland China, in North America, UK, the Middle East, SE Asia and Australia, and published many books, chapters and papers.

She is the founding Chair of the Centre for Global Health which incorporates the work of the Collaborating Centre for Oxford University and CUHK.

Since returning to the UK in 2014, Griffiths has maintained her teaching and research links with Hong Kong, becoming an Emeritus Professor at CUHK, Senior Advisor to the CUHK Vice Chancellor on International Academic Developments between 2014 and 2018 and as an Honorary Consultant for the HKSAR Government.

Other roles have included Specialist Adviser to Healthcare UK, BUPA Associate, Honorary Senior Visiting Fellow at University of Cambridge, Associate of the Moller institute, Churchill College Cambridge, Chair of Staffordshire University's Centre for Health and Development, chair of Oxfordshire Commission into Health Inequalities, in addition to being a member of the advisory board for Glasgow University's Institute of Health and Wellbeing and Senior/Visiting Clinical Lecturer at Oxford University.

Current roles include Non-Executive Board member of Public Health Wales,. She was Associate Non Executive Board Member of Public Health England and Chair of the Global Health Committee, until its demise and between 2017 and 2025 was Trustee, Deputy Chair and then Chair of Gambleware.

Following the outbreak of COVID-19, Griffiths' public health knowledge and experience of the SARS epidemic have been regularly drawn upon in the media in UK and abroad.

== Honours and awards ==
Griffiths has earned a number of honorary degrees and fellowships; including Royal College of Physicians of London (FRCP), Royal Society For Public Health (Hon FRSPH), as a visiting professor at Imperial College London. She has honorary DSc from the University of Staffordshire, and University of West England and is Honorary Fellow of Cardiff University.

Griffiths was appointed Officer of the Order of the British Empire (OBE) in the 2000 New Year Honours for services to public health and Commander of the Order of the British Empire (CBE) in the 2023 New Year Honours for voluntary and charitable services, particularly during COVID-19.

She was appointed Justice of the Peace in 2010 by the HKSAR government for her services to health in Hong Kong.

Griffiths was named Professional of the Year in the American Chamber of Commerce [AMCHAM ]Women of Influence Awards in 2012.

== Media appearances ==
Griffiths appeared in global media during the SARS outbreak in 2003 commenting on the pandemic.

More recently, she has drawn on her SARS knowledge again and has been a frequent media commentator during COVID-19, featuring as an expert adviser in many news outlets including the BBC, CNN, The Guardian, Huffington Post, ITV News, and others.
