= Ruth Lynden-Bell =

British chemist and educator (1937-2026)

Ruth Marion Lynden-Bell
- Born: 7 December 1937
- Died: 27 April 2026 (aged 88)
- Education: Newnham College, Cambridge
- Spouse: Donald Lynden-Bell
- Awards: Fellow of the Royal Society (2006)
- Scientific career
- Fields: Chemistry
- Workplaces: University of Cambridge; Queen's University, Belfast; University of Sussex
- Thesis: Studies in magnetic resonance (1963)
- Doctoral students: Mark Gerstein
- Website: www-jmg.ch.cam.ac.uk/oldchem/staff/rmlb.html

Ruth Marion Lynden-Bell, FRS (7 December 1937–27 April 2026) was a British chemist, emeritus professor of Queen's University Belfast and the University of Cambridge, and acting President of Murray Edwards College, Cambridge from 2011 to 2013.

== Education ==
Ruth Lynden-Bell began her education at King Edward VI High School for Girls, Birmingham. She subsequently studied at Newnham College, Cambridge (BA 1959, PhD 1962) and studied under Norman Sheppard. She briefly studied under the direction of Harden M. McConnell at California Institute of Technology in 1961. Then she became a lecturer in chemistry at the University of Sussex in 1965, and returned to Cambridge in 1972.

== Research and academic career ==
Lynden-Bell's research used atomistic simulation to investigate the properties of liquids. In 1995, she moved to Queen's University Belfast as a co-founder of the interdisciplinary Atomistic Simulation Group (now the Atomistic Simulation Centre).

She was an Emerita Fellow of New Hall, Cambridge (now Murray Edwards College, Cambridge), and was an Associate of Newnham College, Cambridge. She was acting President of Murray Edwards College from January to December 2012. Lynden-Bell also served on the editorial boards of the Journal of Chemical Physics, Chemical Physics Letters and Science and was an editor of Molecular Physics from 1998 to 2003, as well as having been a member of Boards of Electors to Professorial positions in Sweden, the Republic of Ireland, and Oxford and Cambridge Universities. She was a Professor in the School of Mathematics and Physics at Queen's.

== Personal life and death ==
She was the daughter of David and Priscilla Truscott. Priscilla was the sister of Francis Skinner. Lynden-Bell married the astronomer Donald Lynden-Bell in 1961, then a researcher at Caltech; she joined him in California, then moved with him to Cambridge in 1962, to Sussex in 1964, and back to Cambridge in 1972. They had one son and one daughter.

Ruth Lynden-Bell had her first child while at University of Sussex lecturing in a half-time position. She found that being an experimental spectroscopic chemist was highly conducive to her expectations as a mother. Her advice to women in the field is: 1.)" don’t be afraid to ask for things such as part time work. Apart from the Belfast job, every job I got was by asking for it", and 2.) "when opportunities arise take them, it’s worth trying. I never imagined going to Belfast".

Lynden-Bell's professional and personal life is featured in the Royal Society of Chemistry's book Parent Carer Scientist.

She died in late April 2026, at the age of 88.

== Honours and awards ==
- 2003 – Leverhulme Emeritus Fellowship
- 2006 – elected a Fellow of the Royal Society
- 2009 – honorary doctorate from Queen's University Belfast

Academic offices
Preceded by Jennifer Barnes	President of New Hall, Cambridge; 2012–2013	Succeeded by Barbara Stocking
