= Pat Willmer =

British entomologist and ecologist

- Education: University of Cambridge
- Scientific career
- Workplaces: University of Cambridge; University of Oxford; University of St Andrews
- Thesis: Neuronal adaptations to osmotic stress in a bivalve mollusc (Mytilus edulis) (1978)
- Doctoral advisor: John Treherne

Patricia 'Pat' Gillian Willmer is an entomologist and ecologist in the UK. She is emeritus professor of zoology at the University of St Andrews and is an expert in pollination.

== Career and research ==
Willmer studied for a B.A. degree at the University of Cambridge, and then continued to work in Cambridge for her PhD in neurophysiology. Her doctoral work was supervised by John Treherne, and funded by the Science Research Council and New Hall College, Cambridge. Willmer completed her PhD in 1978, and published her work in three papers in the The Journal of Experimental Biology that same year. While her research began in the area of neurobiology she later moved into invertebrate physiology and insect plant interactions. Willmer was a research fellow in Cambridge, and later a lecturer in invertebrate zoology at the University of Oxford, before moving to the University of St Andrews.

She has researched pollination biology many years and she supports agricultural environmental schemes such as wildflower strips to support pollinating insects and enhance crop pollination.

Some of her interesting findings include flowers can change colour such as the legume Desmodium setigerum which changes from lilac to white to turquoise after being visited by a pollinating bee; and acacia plants that manipulate the ants that defend them, releasing a compound mimicking the ant alarm pheromone when they flower so that pollinating insects such as bees can visit.

Willmer was elected to the council of the Linnean Society of London in 2009.

== Selected works ==
- Bees, ants and wasps: a key to genera of the British Aculeates, published by the Field Studies Council in 1985.
- Invertebrate Relationships: Patterns in Animal Evolution, published by Cambridge University Press in 1990.
- Environmental Physiology of Animals, with Graham Stone and Ian Johnston, published by Wiley Blackwell in 2000.
- Pollination and Floral Ecology, published by Princeton University Press in 2011.
