= Trevor Ian Shaw =

English experimental biologist (1928-1972)

- Born: 18 March 1928; York, North Yorkshire, England
- Died: 26 September 1972 (aged 44)
- Education: Great Ayton and Bootham School, York
- Alma mater: Clare College, Cambridge
- Known for: Professor at Queen Mary College, London
- Spouse: Hanna Schmeltzer
- Children: 2 daughters
- Parents: Donovan Shaw (father); Mona Shaw (mother)
- Scientific career
- Fields: Biology
- Military career
- Branch: British Army
- Unit: Royal Army Medical Corps

Trevor Ian Shaw (18 March 1928 – 26 September 1972) was an English experimental biologist who pioneered studies in physiology and biochemistry contributing to the understanding of transport across cell membranes against concentration gradients through active metabolism and the exchange of sodium and potassium ions. He also examined the mechanism by which the seaweed Laminaria digitata accumulated iodine and was known for his innovative experimental techniques.

== Background ==
Shaw was born in York to Donovan and Mona. Educated at Great Ayton and Bootham School, York, he went to Clare College, Cambridge, where he studied medicine. His interests were mainly in physiology and he was encouraged by E.D. Adrian, Alan Hodgkin, Frederick Russell, and others. He obtained a PhD in 1954 for studies on sodium and potassium movement in red blood cells under A. L. Hodgkin.

== National Service ==
He then served in the Second World War where he became a close friend of John Treherne.

== Academia ==
After the war he worked at Plymouth. In 1966 he became a professor at Queen Mary College, London. He collaborated with David Gilbert, Gordon Newell and K.A. Simkiss. He was among the first to use luciferin to detect ATP activity in physiological experiments.

== Personal life ==
He married Hanna Schmeltzer who he met on a Channel crossing. They had two daughters Susan Cordelia and Caroline Imogen. He died at the age of 44 in a railway accident.
