= Anne Lonsdale =

British sinologist

Anne Mary Lonsdale CBE (née Menzies, first married name Griffin, born 16 February 1941) is a British sinologist and was the third President of New Hall, Cambridge.

== Life ==
Born Anne Menzies in Huddersfield in February 1941, the only child of Alexander Menzies, a professor of physics at the University of Leeds, Lonsdale was educated at Heathfield School, Pinner before winning a scholarship to read classics at St Anne's College, Oxford in 1957. She then took a second degree in Chinese and taught classical Chinese literature before becoming a university administrator.

Lonsdale was chairman of the Board of Camfed International (a Non-governmental organization focused on education and job opportunities for girls in Sub-Saharan Africa), and is now chairman and honorary secretary of the Council for Assisting Refugee Academics, a Trustee of the European Humanities University in Vilnius and of the Open Society Foundation. Lonsdale travelled and worked extensively in America, Europe, Asia and Africa, and was active for many years in both European and Commonwealth university organisations. Outside the university, she was a Trustee of the British Association for Central and Eastern Europe, the Inter-University Foundation and the Moscow School of Social & Economic Sciences. From 1993 to 1996 she was Secretary-General of the Central European University based in Budapest, Prague and Warsaw, founded by George Soros in 1991. She developed a major interest in environmental research and policy and was involved in the setting up of a Department of Environmental Sciences and Policy at the CEU Budapest for students from all the countries of Central and Eastern Europe and the former USSR.

In 1996 Lonsdale was appointed as the third President of New Hall, Cambridge, a position she held until 2008. In this period she also served as Pro-Vice-Chancellor for External Relations, Deputy Vice-Chancellor and was a member of the university's Council and a co-founder and Director of Cambridge in America, the Cambridge Commonwealth Trust and Cambridge Overseas Trust, a Trustee of the Cambridge Foundation, the Gates Cambridge Trust, the Newton Trust, and the Cambridge European Trust, and was Chairman of the Syndicate for the Fitzwilliam Museum. She is currently prorector of the governing board of the Nazarbayev University. in Kazakhstan. She serves on the advisory council of the UK Friends of the National Museum of Women in the Arts.

In 2004 Lonsdale was awarded the CBE for services to Higher Education. She is Officier des Palmes Academiques (France) and Cavaliere del’Ordine al Merito della Repubblica Italiana.

She married Geoffrey Griffin in 1962 but he died the same year. In 1964 she remarried Roger Lonsdale; her second marriage ended in divorce in 1994.

Academic offices
Preceded by Valerie Pearl	President of New Hall, Cambridge; 1996–2008	Succeeded by Jennifer Barnes
