= Valerie Pearl =

British historian (1926-2016)

Valerie Louise Pearl (née Bence; 31 December 1926 – 29 January 2016) was a British historian who was noted for her work on the English Civil War. She was the second President of New Hall, Cambridge.

== Life ==
Pearl was the daughter of Cyril Bence, the former Labour Party Member of Parliament for East Dunbartonshire. She was educated at St Anne's College, Oxford, going up in 1946 and gaining a Second-Class degree in Modern History. She subsequently gained a D.Phil. for her thesis, supervised by Christopher Hill, on London and the outbreak of the Puritan Revolution, 1625–1643. This was published in revised form by the Oxford University Press in 1961.

Between 1965 and 1968, Pearl was a lecturer in History at Somerville College, Oxford. Having been offered a Fellowship at Somerville provided she resided in Oxford on a full-time basis, she reluctantly moved to University College, London, as Reader in London History, later succeeding T. F. Reddaway in holding a chair in the same subject. She was actively involved (with H. J. Dyos) in the foundation of the London Journal: A Review of Metropolitan Society Past and Present in 1975, and served as editor of the first five numbers, until 1977. She served as president of the London and Middlesex Archaeological Society in 1980–81.

In 1981 Pearl was appointed as the second President of New Hall, Cambridge, a position she held until 1995. To expand the New Hall Art Collection, she wrote in 1992 to 100 of the leading women artists in Britain and received some 75 donations in return.

== Personal life ==
In 1949, Valerie Bence married Morris Pearl, with whom she had a daughter, Sara.

== Publications ==
- Pearl, Valerie (1961). London and the Outbreak of the Puritan Revolution: City government and national politics, 1625–43. Oxford: Oxford University Press.
- Pearl, Valerie (1966). "Oliver St. John and the 'middle group' in the Long Parliament: August 1643–May 1644". English Historical Review. 81: 490–519. doi:10.1093/ehr/lxxxi.cccxx.490.
- Pearl, Valerie (1968). "The 'Royal Independents' in the English Civil War". Transactions of the Royal Historical Society. 5th. 18: 69–96. doi:10.2307/3678956. JSTOR 3678956. S2CID 159778218.
- Pearl, Valerie (1969). "London Puritans and Scotch fifth columnists: a mid 17th century phenomenon". In Hollaender, A. E. J.; Kellaway, William (eds.). Studies in London History presented to Philip Edmund Jones. London: Hodder and Stoughton. pp. 317–31.
- Pearl, Valerie (1970). "Exorcist or historian: the dangers of ghost-hunting". Past & Present (47): 122–7. doi:10.1093/past/47.1.122.
- Pearl, Valerie (1972). "London's Counter-Revolution". In Aylmer, G. E. (ed.). The Interregnum: the quest for settlement, 1646–1660. London: Macmillan. pp. 29–56.
- Pearl, Valerie (1978). "Puritans and poor relief: the London workhouse, 1649–60". In Pennington, Donald; Thomas, Keith (eds.). Puritans and Revolutionaries: essays in seventeenth-century history presented to Christopher Hill. Oxford: Clarendon Press. pp. 206–32.
- Pearl, Valerie (1979). "Change and stability in seventeenth-century London". London Journal. 5 (1): 3–34. doi:10.1179/ldn.1979.5.1.3.
- Pearl, Valerie (1979). "John Stow" (PDF). Transactions of the London and Middlesex Archaeological Society. 30: 130–34.
- Pearl, Valerie (1981). "Social policy in early modern London". In Lloyd-Jones, Hugh; Pearl, Valerie; Worden, Blair (eds.). History and Imagination: essays in honour of H.R. Trevor-Roper. London: Duckworth. pp. 115–31. ISBN 978-0715615706.

Academic offices
Preceded by Dame Rosemary Murray	President of New Hall, Cambridge; 1981–1995	Succeeded by Anne Lonsdale
