= John Treherne =

British academic & author (1929-1989)

John Edwin Treherne
- Born: 15 May 1929; Swindon, Wiltshire, England
- Died: 23 September 1989 (aged 60)
- Education: Headlands School, Swindon
- Alma mater: Bristol University
- Occupations: University lecturer Author
- Known for: vice-president of the Royal Entomological Society
- Spouse: June Vivienne Freeman (m. 1955)
- Children: 2
- Scientific career
- Fields: Entomology
- Military career
- Branch: British Army
- Unit: Royal Army Medical Corps

John Edwin Treherne (15 May 1929 – 23 September 1989) was an English entomologist who specialized in insect biochemistry and physiology and conducted extensive experimental studies. He was also a noted author, including the historically located The Galapagos Affair (1983) which he wrote after spending some time in the Galapagos conducting research.

== Background ==
Treherne was born in Swindon and went to Headlands School, Swindon where his childhood friends included Desmond Morris and Diane Dors. He then studied zoology at the Bristol University, after which he spent a summer at Uppsala University, Sweden, where his interest in insect physiology originated.

He was called up to do his national service in the Royal Army Medical Corps where he met the biologist Trevor Shaw. The two of them would discuss evolution while on guard duty, and were punished to patrol in the snow by a superior officer, a Christian fundamentalist. Treherne then feigned agreement with the officer that fossils had been planted by the devil and as a result spent time indoors next to a fire. He joked later in life that pragmatism and opportunism had a role in the survival of the fittest.

== Academia ==
After the army, he joined the Insect Physiology Unit at Downing College in Cambridge under Vincent Wigglesworth as a lecturer and reader. In 1955 he worked with the Agricultural Research Council to study digestion in Periplaneta americana, making use of isotopes to trace the movement of glucose and trehalose.

In 1971 Treherne became a Reader in Experimental Biology at Downing, heading the chemistry and physiology lab and studying insect neurobiology, gut physiology, the chemistry of circadian rhythms and other biochemical studies in insects, annelids and molluscs. During this period he collaborated with Simon Maddrell, Yves Pichon, Michael Bate, Malcolm Burrows and Roger Moreton. His students included Mike Berridge, Peter Evans, Nancy Lane, David Sattelle, Philip Schofield, Helen Skaer and Pat Willmer. Treherne was President of Downing College from 1985 until 1988.

He demonstrated the blood-brain barrier in insects, among the few invertebrates to have them. Among his ideas was the "Trafalgar Effect", that groups of Halobates could relay indication of a predator so that even the most distant individuals could take evasive action well before the predator became visible to them.

Treherne served as an editor for several journals, and was the vice-president of the Royal Entomological Society in 1967-68. His scientific books included The Neurochemistry of Arthropods (Cambridge University Press, 1966) and (as editor, with James Beament) Physiology of the Insect Central Nervous System (Academic Press, 1965).

== Author ==
In later life he began to take an interest in applying science to unsolved criminal mysteries and began to write books for pleasure. He was a close friend of P.D. James, and helped her set up the P.D. James Prize for creative writing by undergraduates. His publications included:

- The Galapagos Affair (1983). Produced shortly after his visit to the islands to study the behaviour of Halobates. It tells the story of a series of unsolved disappearances on the Galapagos island of Floreana in the 1930s among the largely European expatriate residents at the time.
- The Strange History of Bonnie and Clyde (1984). Investigating the history of bank robbers Bonnie Parker and Clyde Barrow, a young sociopathic Southern couple gunned down by authorities after a two-year crime spree that left twelve people dead.
- The Trap (1985). His first novel, concerning a skeleton found at the bottom of the pond in a 1930s English village.
- Dangerous Precincts: Mystery of the Wakefield Case (1987). Details the false accusations made against John Wakeford, the Archdeacon of Stow, his trial and dismissal from his ministry at Lincoln Cathedral in the 1920s.
- Mangrove Chronicle (1986). Novel about a party of academics and students on a South Sea mission to collect biological specimens.
- The Walk to Acorn Bridge (1989). Novel set in 1900 describing the Wiltshire village life of a group of boys later to be reunited in the horror of war.
- The Canning Enigma (1989). Examines the case of Elizabeth Canning, an English maidservant who claimed to have been kidnapped in 1753 and held against her will in a hayloft for almost a month.

== Personal ==
Treherne married June Vivienne Freeman in 1955 and they shared an interest in history. They had a son Mark and a daughter Rebecca. He died of a heart attack at Downing College at the age of 60.
