= Rachel Polonsky =

British scholar specializing in Slavic Literature

- Occupations: Acting President of Murray Edwards College, Cambridge, affiliated lecturer in the Department of Slavonic Studies and author.

Academic work
- Discipline: Slavic Literature

Rachel Polonsky is a British scholar specialising in Slavic Literature. Her books include Molotov's Magic Lantern and English Literature and the Russian Aesthetic Renaissance. She is Acting President of Murray Edwards College of the University of Cambridge, where she is a Fellow in Slavonic Studies, former Vice-President, and a Graduate Tutor in Modern Languages/ Slavonic Studies (Russian).

== Education ==
- MA in English (Jesus College, University of Cambridge)
- MA Russian Studies (Princeton University)
- D.Phil (Oxford University) with a thesis on the reception of English literature in early 19th century Russia

== Career ==
- Research Fellow at Emmanuel College, Cambridge.
- Independent scholar and freelance journalist in Moscow
- Fellow of Murray Edwards since 2011

== Bibliography ==
- Polonsky, Rachel. Molotov's Magic Lantern: Travels in Russian History. Farrar, Straus and Giroux, 2011 ISBN 9780374211974
  - Translated into Chinese by Chuangchuang Lu as Cong Mosike dao Gulage : Eluosi li shi shang de guang hui yu hei an = Molotov's magic lantern : a journey in Russian history
  - Translated into Italian as La lanterna magica di Molotov : viaggio nella storia della Russia
  - Translated into Dutch by Nico Groen; Marianne Tieleman; Ansfried Scheifes as Molotovs toverlantaarn : een reis door de Russische geschiedenis
  - Translated into Polish by Marek Król; as Latarnia magiczna Mołotowa : podróże w historię Rosji
- Polonsky, Rachel. English Literature and the Russian Aesthetic Renaissance. Cambridge [England]: Cambridge University Press,1998. ISBN 9780521027472
