= Dorothy Byrne =

Television producer and college president

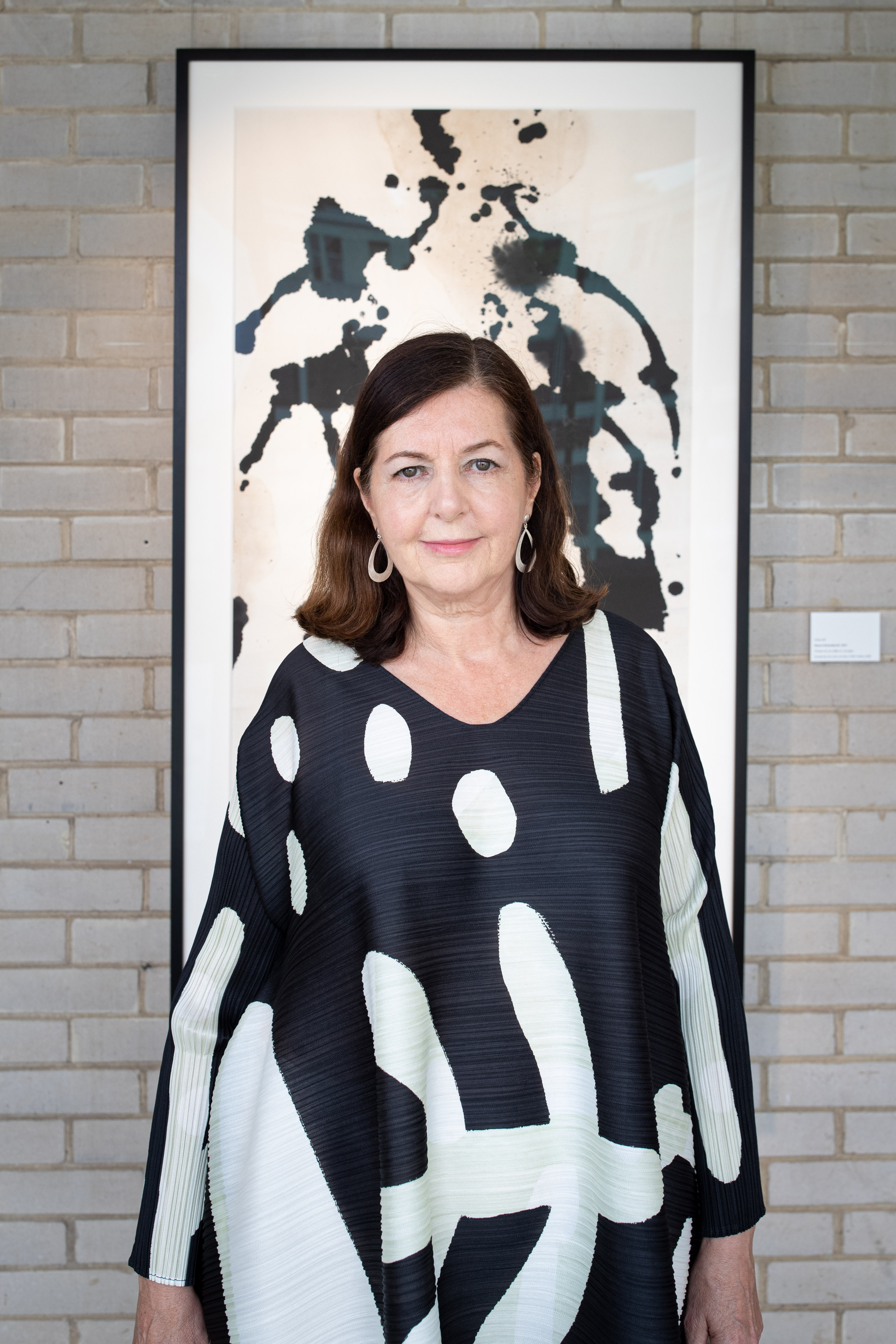
- Born: 1953 (age 72–73); Paisley, Renfrewshire, Scotland
- Education: Manchester University
- Known for: Head of News and Current Affairs at Channel 4 Television

Dorothy Byrne (born 1953 in Scotland) is a British television news editor. Dorothy was Head of News and Current Affairs at Channel 4 Television for 15 years, during which time her programmes won numerous Royal Television Society, BAFTA and Emmy awards, she was elected a Fellow of the Royal Television Society for her outstanding contribution to television and has won several major television awards including the RTS Journalism Award. In 2019, Byrne delivered the prestigious MacTaggart Lecture at the Edinburgh Television Festival in which she criticised politicians for lying and failing to be held to account. She served as President of Murray Edwards College, Cambridge, between 2021 and 2025.

== Early life and education ==
The daughter of Charles and Agnes Byrne, she was educated at Layton Hill Convent, Blackpool, before reading philosophy at Manchester University (BA Hons), then business studies at Sheffield University (Diploma).

== Career ==
Byrne was producer of World in Action (ITV), 1992–95, and editor of The Big Story (ITV), 1995–98. In 1998 she was appointed Commissioning Editor of Current Affairs and editor of Dispatches at Channel 4. In 2003 she was appointed Head of News and Current Affairs at Channel 4. She stepped down in 2020 and was appointed Editor-at-Large of Channel 4 Television.

From 2005 to 2016, she was a Visiting Professor at the School of Journalism of the University of Lincoln. Since 2016, she has been a visiting professor at De Montfort University. In 2019, she delivered both the MacTaggart Lecture at the Edinburgh Television Festival and the Cockcroft Rutherford Lecture at the University of Manchester. In 2020, she was elected a Visiting Fellow at the Reuters Institute for the Study of Journalism, Oxford.

In December 2008, Byrne defended Channel 4's invitation to Mahmoud Ahmadinejad, the Iranian President, to deliver the channel's "alternative Christmas message": "As the leader of one of the most powerful states in the Middle East, President Ahmadinejad's views are enormously influential. ... we are offering our viewers an insight into an alternative world view". The Israeli Ambassador to the UK, Ron Prosor, said: "In Iran, converts to Christianity face the death penalty. It is perverse that this despot is allowed to speculate on the views of Jesus, while his government leads Christ's followers to the gallows."

In December 2020, Byrne was elected as the sixth President of Murray Edwards College, Cambridge. She took up the appointment on 17 September 2021, following the retirement of Dame Barbara Stocking. She stepped down as President on 31 August 2025.

Byrne has received honorary doctorates from her almae matres: Hon. LittD (University of Sheffield) in 2018 and Hon. LittD (University of Manchester) in 2021. She also received the Honorary Degree of Doctor of the University from the University of the West of Scotland in 2022, and is an Honorary Graduate of the University of Portsmouth.

In November 2019, Byrne published Trust Me, I'm Not a Politician, an essay asking how our trust in democracy and public life can be regained.

On 2 June 2024 Byrne was interviewed on BBC Radio 3's programme Private Passions, with her choice of music that has been significant in her life, many details of her personal biography, and her concern over the lack of women in high office: "we need more old women everywhere."

== See also ==
- New Hall, Cambridge

Academic offices
| Preceded by Dame Barbara Stocking | President, Murray Edwards College, Cambridge; 2021–present | Incumbent |
