= Alison Holmes =

Professor of Infectious Diseases

Alison Holmes OBE FRCP FRCPI FMedSci
- Education: University of Cambridge; St George's Hospital Medical School; Harvard School of Public Health
- Scientific career
- Fields: Antimicrobial resistance
- Workplaces: Imperial College London; Imperial College Healthcare NHS Trust; University of Liverpool
- Website: www.imperial.ac.uk/people/alison.holmes

Alison Helen Holmes is a British infectious diseases specialist, who is a professor at Imperial College London and the University of Liverpool. Holmes serves as Director of the National Institute for Health Research (NIHR) Health Protection Research Unit in Healthcare Associated Infections and Antimicrobial Resistance and Consultant at Hammersmith Hospital. Holmes is on the Executive Committee of the International Society of Infectious Diseases, and she serves on a variety of World Health Organization (WHO) expert groups related to antimicrobial use, Antimicrobial Resistance (AMR), infection prevention and sepsis. Her research considers how to mitigate antimicrobial resistance.

== Early life and education ==
Holmes went to school in Dar es Salaam, Tanzania. Her father was a doctor in Nigeria. Holmes completed her Bachelor of Medicine, Bachelor of Surgery degree in medicine at the University of Cambridge and St George’s Hospital Medical School. She specialised in Infectious Diseases and General (Internal) Medicine.

== Research and career ==
Antimicrobial resistance (AMR) represents a major threat to healthcare. There are increasing numbers of bacteria that can no longer be treated with antibiotics. At Imperial College London Holmes leads Centre for Antimicrobial Optimisation, a research centre that looks to tackle drug-resistant infection. She is Director of the National Institute for Health Research (NIHR) Health Protection Research Unit in Healthcare Associated Infections and AMR.

In 2023, Holmes launched the Centres for Antimicrobial Optimisation Network (CAMO-Net), a Wellcome Trust funded research collaboration of universities based in 11 different countries, designed to address antimicrobial resistance and support antimicrobial optimisation for use in humans.

== Selected publications ==
- Birgand G, Castro-Sánchez E, Hansen S, et al., 2018, Comparison of governance approaches for the control of antimicrobial resistance: Analysis of three European countries, Antimicrobial Resistance and Infection Control, Vol:7, ISSN 2047-2994 Comparison of governance approaches for the control of antimicrobial resistance: analysis of three European countries
- Holmes AH, Holmes M, Gottlieb T, et al., 2018, End non-essential use of antimicrobials in livestock, Bmj, Vol:360, ISSN 0959-8138 End non-essential use of antimicrobials in livestock
- Ardal C, Outterson K, Hoffman SJ, et al., 2016, International cooperation to improve access to and sustain effectiveness of antimicrobials, The Lancet, Vol:387, ISSN 0140-6736, Pages:296–307 International cooperation to improve access to and sustain effectiveness of antimicrobials
- Holmes AH, Moore LSP, Sundsfjord A, et al., 2015, Understanding the mechanisms and drivers of antimicrobial resistance, Lancet, Vol:387, ISSN 1474-547X, Pages:176–187 Understanding the mechanisms and drivers of antimicrobial resistance
- Charani E, Holmes AH, 2013, Antimicrobial stewardship programmes: the need for wider engagement, BMJ Quality & Safety, Vol:22, ISSN 2044-5415, Pages:885–887 Antimicrobial stewardship programmes: the need for wider engagement

== Honours and awards ==
Holmes was elected a Fellow of the Academy of Medical Sciences (FMedSci) in 2017.

She was appointed Officer of the Order of the British Empire (OBE) in the 2021 Birthday Honours for services to medicine and infectious diseases, particularly during Covid-19.
