= Barbara Stocking =

British public servant

Dame Barbara Stocking DBE
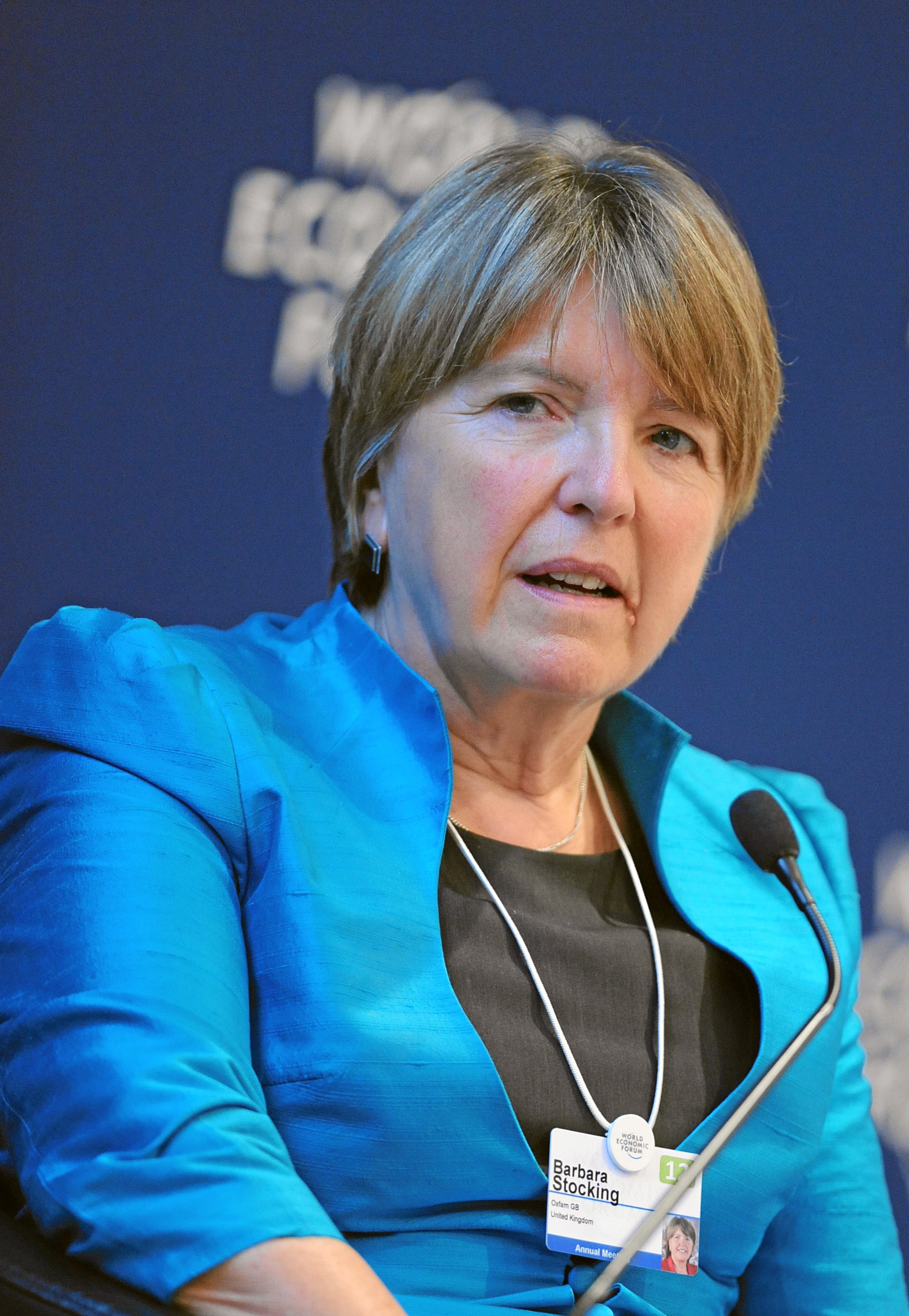
- Speaking at the World Economic Forum, Davos, 2012
- Born: Barbara Mary Stocking; 28 July 1951 (age 75); Rugby, Warwickshire, England
- Education: New Hall, Cambridge
- Occupation: College president
- Known for: Former chief executive of Oxfam, Britain

Dame Barbara Mary Stocking, DBE (born 28 July 1951) is a British public servant, former chief executive of Oxfam GB, and former president of Murray Edwards College, Cambridge.

== Early life and education ==
Stocking was born in Rugby, Warwickshire to Methodist parents, her mother a homemaker and her father a postman. She attended Rugby High School for Girls, where she was Head Girl and New Hall, Cambridge, in 1969, graduating with a degree in Pharmacology. She was the first in her family to go to university.

== Health care systems ==
On graduating from Cambridge, Stocking briefly contemplated a career in science before taking a job as secretary to a committee at the National Academy of Sciences, Washington, DC, where she familiarized herself with the Veterans Health Administration hospital system.

After starting work in 1979 for the World Health Organization in West Africa, Stocking, in 1987, was appointed director of the King's Fund Centre for Health Services Development.

== NHS ==
In the 1990s, she was posted in the NHS administrative system, taking up the position of chief executive of the Regional Health Authority of Oxford. In 1994, she was promoted to the position of NHS regional director for Anglia and Oxfordshire. There were eight NHS regional directors in total after a re-organization that, by April 1996, abolished six management outposts and fourteen regional health-authorities.

In 2000, she was appointed a CBE for "services to health."

In late 2000, Stocking applied for the NHS top position. In October 2000, Nigel Crisp was nominated Chief Executive of the NHS, and Stocking director of the NHS Modernisation Agency, the body tasked with rolling out the NHS reforms. In December 2000, she announced she would leave the public sector to join non-governmental, charity organization Oxfam.

== Oxfam ==
In May 2001, Stocking was appointed Oxfam's chief executive on a £75,000-a-year contract.

=== Direction ===
Stocking, during her tenure, built Oxfam's relationships with major, international, private corporations such as Unilever, Monsoon, Sysco, and others, on "many diverse projects," while also Oxfam grew to become one of Britain's biggest retailers with more than 700 shops and, through its secondhand book outlets, the charity stood among Europe's biggest book retailers. In 2009, Oxfam's shops made a profit of about £20m on £80m of revenue, with the charity posting a record total revenue of £318m.

In a 2010 interview, she stated: "Times have changed, and Oxfam is moving with the times. It took a while for many in the organisation to understand what is happening but since the late 1990s we have seen quite different relationships develop with private business."

In 2011, Oxfam launched a campaign for "food justice in a resource-constrained world." Stocking stated that the organization's focus would be also on helping small land-holders and nomadic tribes to establish their land rights against richer nations "such as China and the Gulf States gobbling up land in Africa."

During Stocking's tenure there, Oxfam faced many humanitarian crises, such as those caused by the conflicts in Afghanistan and Iraq as well as by natural disasters such as the South-Asian tsunami and the Pakistan earthquake.

=== Allegations of Oxfam staff misconduct in Haiti ===
In February 2018, an investigation by the Times reported that, during Stocking's tenure, Oxfam allowed three men to resign and sacked four others for "gross misconduct" after an inquiry concerning sexual exploitation, the downloading of pornography, bullying, and intimidation by Oxfam's staff in Haiti. The Times stated that an internal, confidential report was produced by Oxfam in 2011. It found that there had been “a culture of impunity” among some staff in Haiti and concluded that "it cannot be ruled out that any of the prostitutes were under-aged."

Among the staff who were permitted by Oxfam's leadership to resign without further actions taken against them was the charity's country director, Roland van Hauwermeiren. According to Oxfam's internal report, van Hauwermeiren admitted using prostitutes at a villa whose rent was paid with Oxfam funds meant for charity. Stocking, Oxfam's CEO at the time, offered Hauwermeiren “a phased and dignified exit” invoking her concern that sacking him risked “potentially serious implications for the charity’s work and reputation."

When the allegations became public in 2018, Stocking stated that her biggest work mistake had been “Not getting rid of people soon enough." Murray Edwards College issued a statement disputing the allegation that Stocking was involved in a "cover up" and affirming that she has the "College’s full support". Stocking postponed a planned February 2018 visit to the Cambridge Union in light of the 'considerable media attention' surrounding her involvement with Oxfam.

Following the resignation of Penny Lawrence, Oxfam's deputy chief executive, Robert Halfon, Conservative MP and Chairman of the Education Select Committee, accused Stocking of trying to “escape responsibility for the Haiti prostitution scandal." Halfon criticized the former Oxfam head who, he stated, had behaved “outrageously” in allowing senior aid workers to "resign quietly from the charity."

== Murray Edwards College, Cambridge ==
In 2010, Stocking's alma mater, Murray Edwards College, Cambridge, formerly known as New Hall, a women-only constituent college of the University of Cambridge, named her an Honorary Fellow. In March 2013, Stocking was elected president of the college, assuming her duties in July 2013.

In October 2017, Stocking announced that Murray Edwards would be changing its admissions policy to allow it to accept transgender students who identify as female. Stocking stated that the college is "open to all outstanding young women" and "so it is absolutely right, both legally and within [the college's] set of values, for anyone who identifies as female to be able to apply to study [in it]."

== Awards and appointments ==
In 2008, Barbara Stocking was promoted Dame Commander of the Order of the British Empire (DBE).

In March 2015, Stocking was appointed Chair of an Independent Panel to assess the World Health Organization's response in the Ebola outbreak. In 2016, she was appointed Chair of Trustees of the independent charity organization, A Blueprint for Better Business.

== Personal life ==
Stocking is married to Dr John MacInnes, who is a prison doctor. They have two sons, Andrew and Stephen.

Academic offices
Preceded by Ruth Lynden-Bell	President of Murray Edwards College, Cambridge; 2013–2021	Succeeded by Dorothy Byrne
