= Murray Edwards College, Cambridge =

College of the University of Cambridge

Coordinates: 52.2142°N 0.1086°E

Murray Edwards College
- University of Cambridge
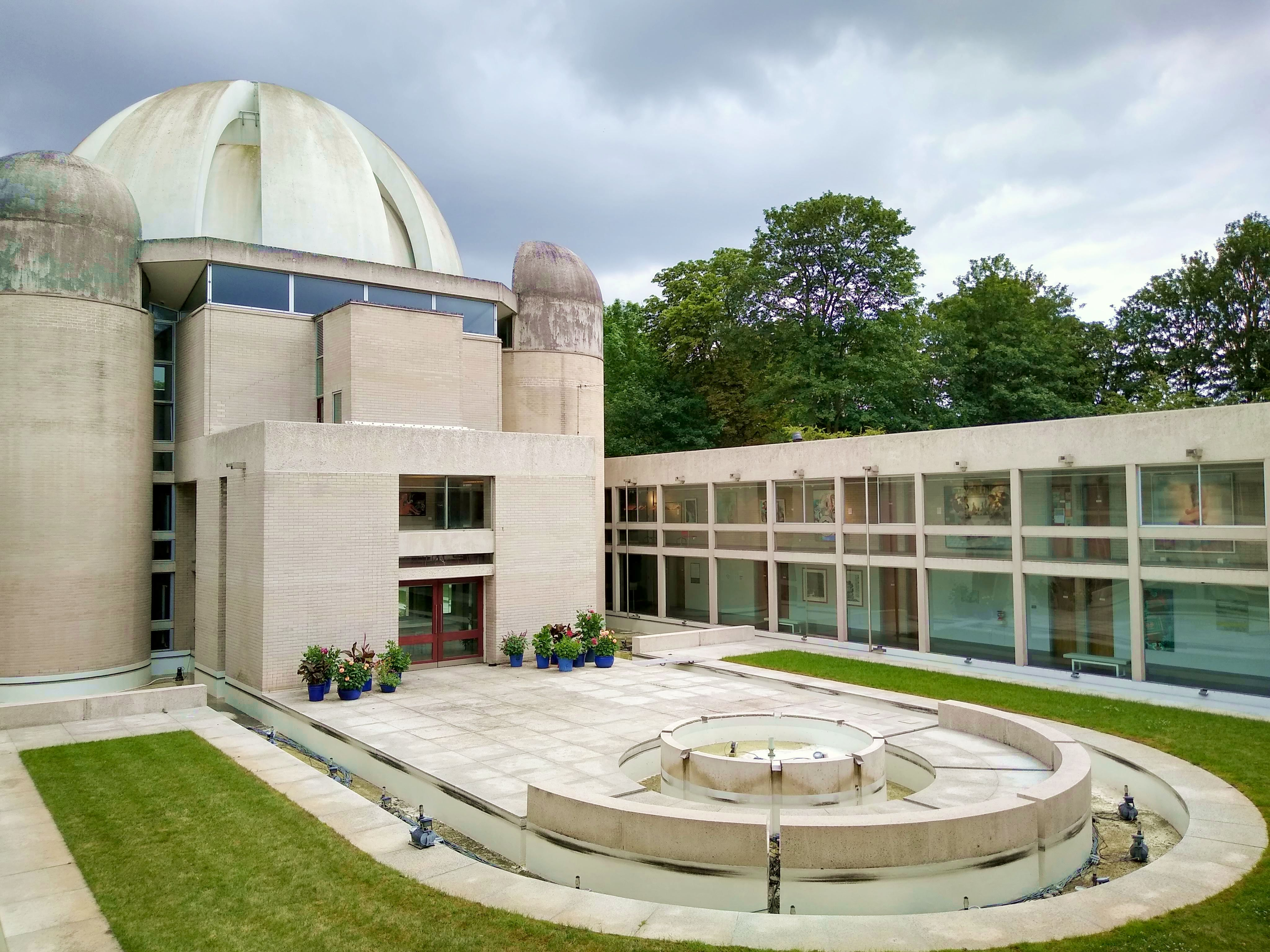
- Fountain Court in July 2019

- Arms: Sable a Dolphin palewise head downwards to the dexter in chief three Mullets fesswise a Bordure embattled Argent
Scarf colours: three equally-spaced narrow stripes separating two black areas towards the edge and two blue areas in the middle, the outer stripes of yellow and the central stripe of red
- Location: Huntingdon Road, Cambridge (map)
- Full name: Murray Edwards College, founded as New Hall, in the University of Cambridge
- Abbreviation: MUR
- Established: 1954
- Named after: Rosemary Murray; Ros (Smith) and Steve Edwards
- Gender: Women
- Sister college: St Anne's College, Oxford
- President: Rachel Polonsky (acting)
- Undergraduates: 397 (2022–23)
- Postgraduates: 172 (2022–23)
- Endowment: £58.3m (2024)
- Website: murrayedwards.cam.ac.uk
- Student union: mecsu.weebly.com
- MCR: memcr.soc.srcf.net
- Boat club: Murray Edwards College Boat Club

Map
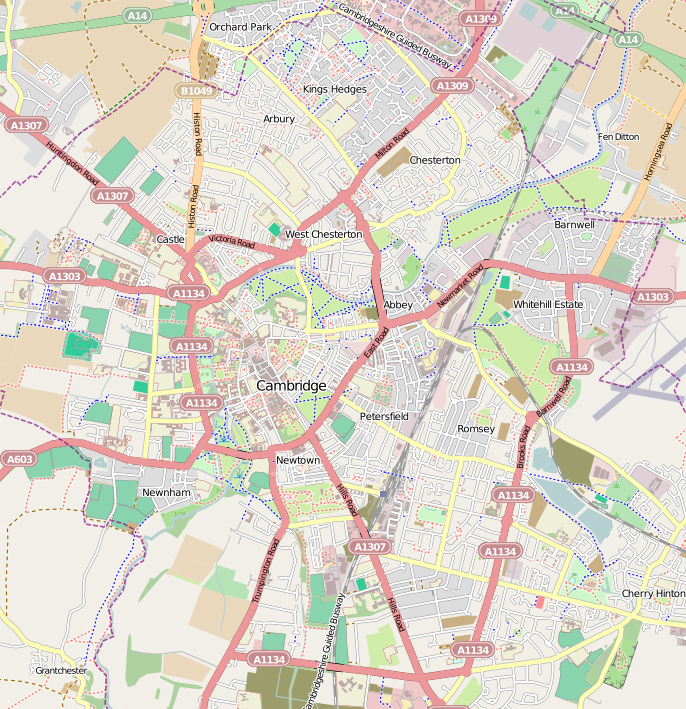
- Location within Cambridge

Murray Edwards College is a women-focused constituent college of the University of Cambridge. It was founded in 1954 as New Hall and renamed in 2008. The name honours a gift of £30 million by alumna Ros Edwards and her husband Steve, and the first president and woman vice-chancellor of the University of Cambridge, Dame Rosemary Murray.

== History ==
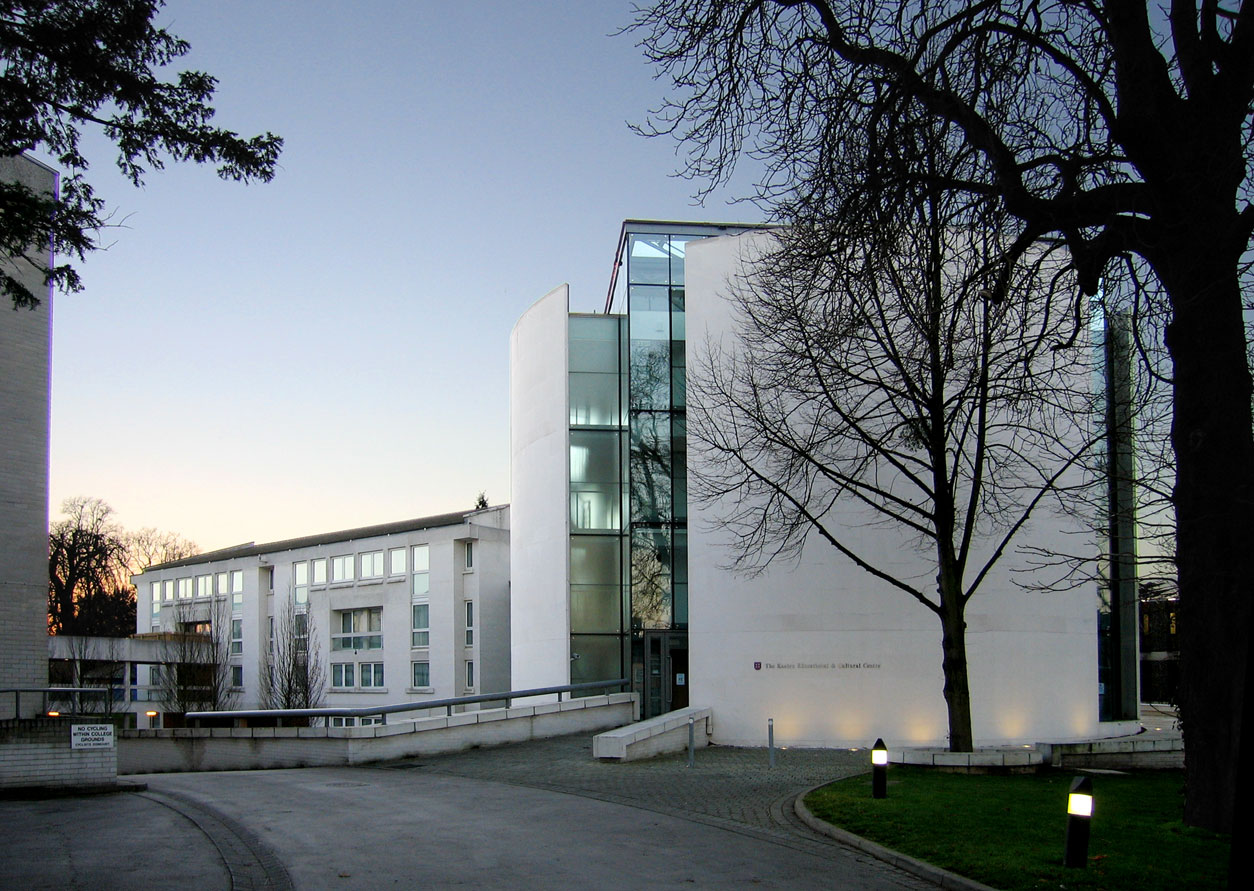
The Paula Browne House Conference Centre (formerly the Kaetsu Centre) provides conference facilities and accommodation for Murray Edwards.

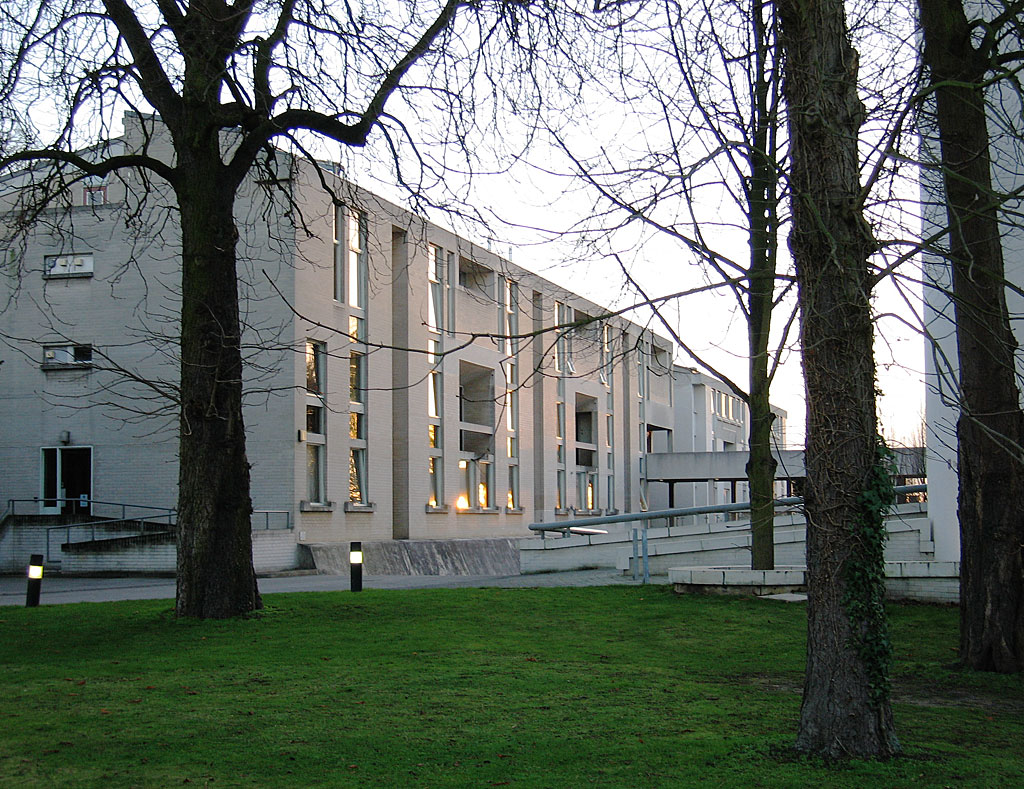
Accommodation block

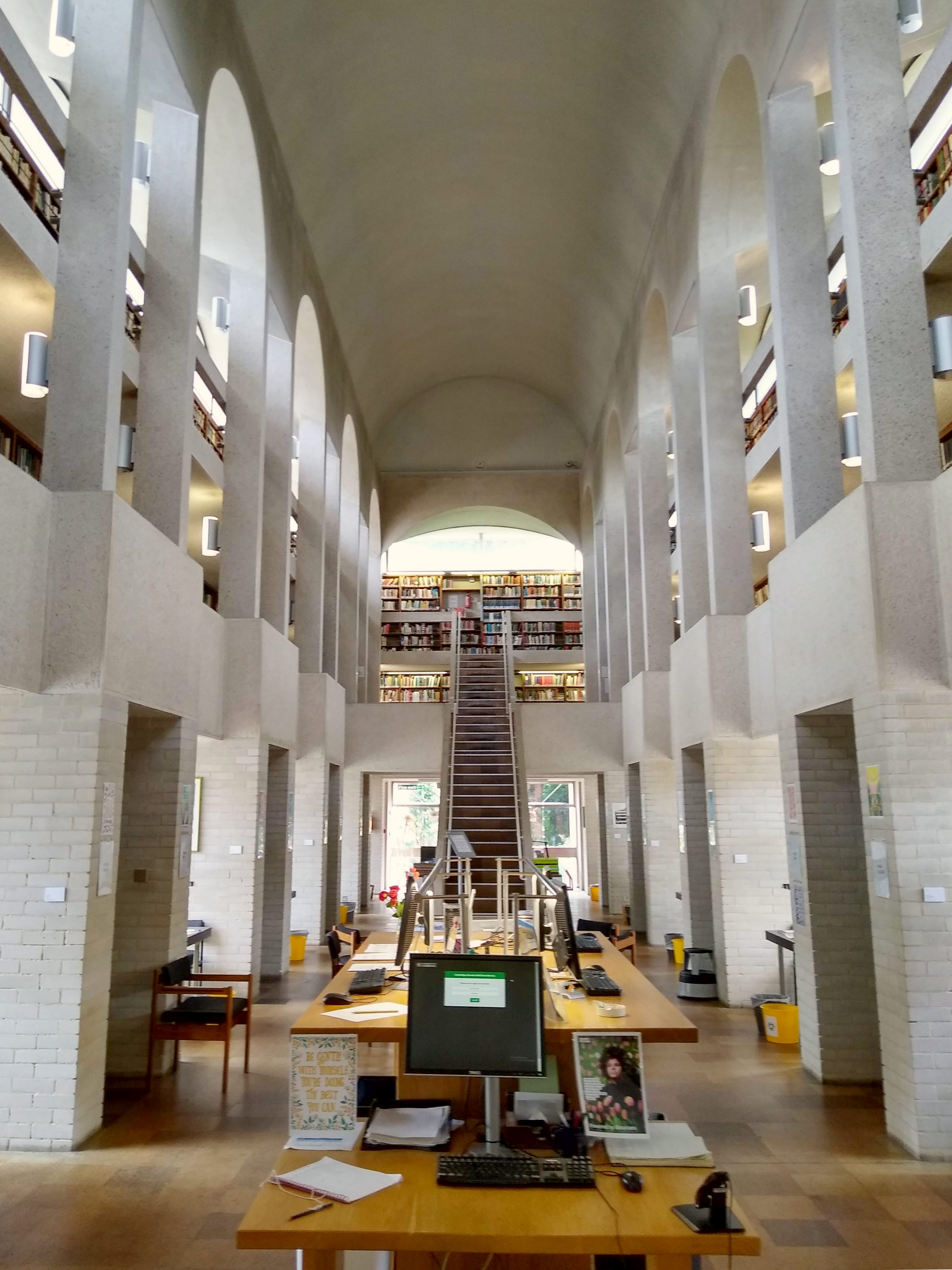
Library

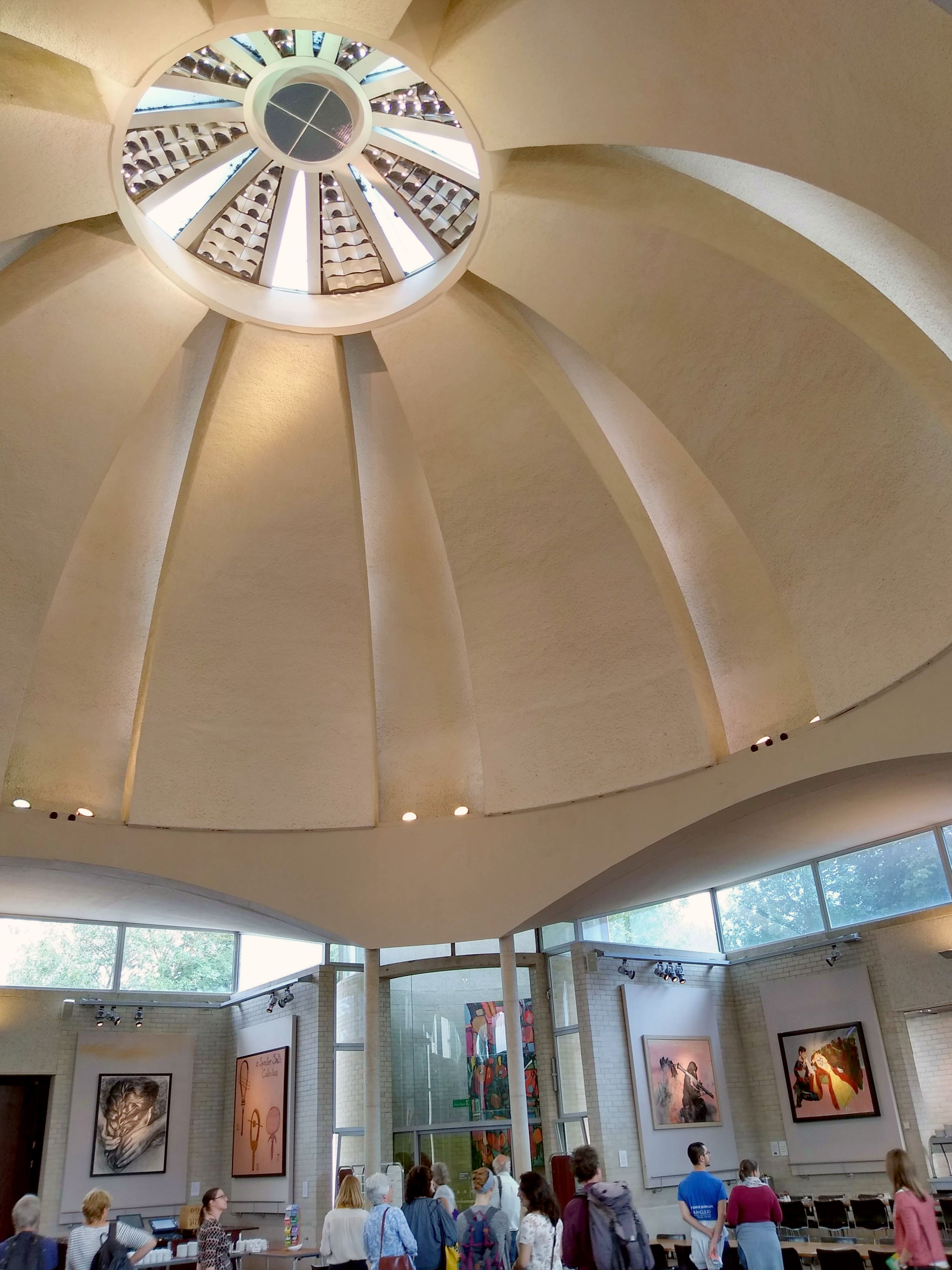
Interior of the dome and dining hall

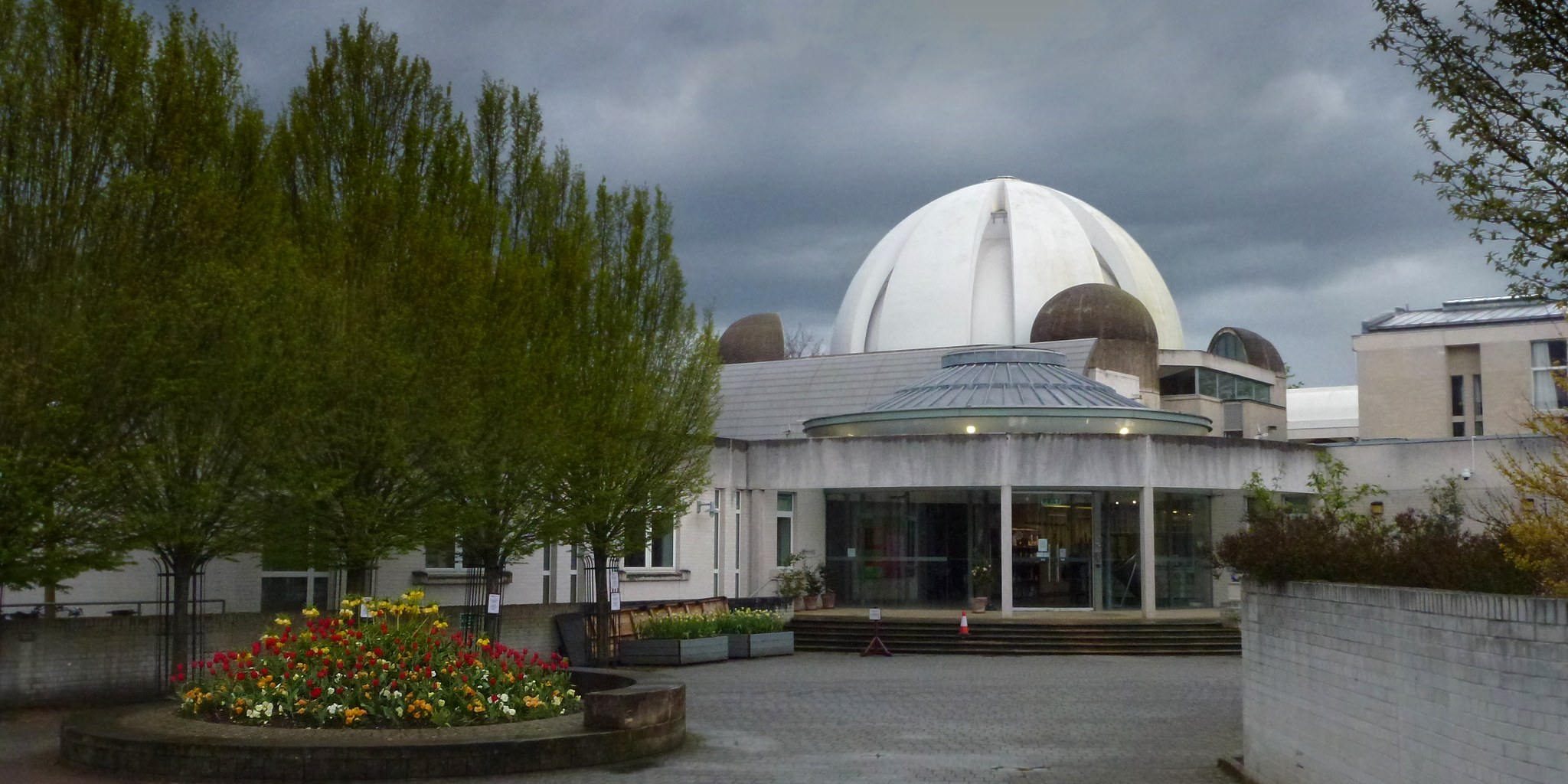
The Murray Edwards College porters' lodge, with the dome over the dining hall in the background

New Hall was founded in 1954, housing sixteen students in Silver Street where Darwin College now stands. Cambridge then had the lowest proportion of women undergraduates of any university in the United Kingdom and only two other colleges (Girton and Newnham) admitted female students.

In 1962, members of the Darwin family gave their home, "The Orchard", to the College. This new site was located on Huntingdon Road, about a mile from the centre of Cambridge. The architects chosen were Chamberlin, Powell and Bon, who are known for their design of the Barbican in London, and fundraising commenced. The building work began in 1964 and was completed by W. & C. French in 1965. The new college could house up to 300 students.

In 1967, one of the college's PhD students, Jocelyn Bell Burnell, a researcher in the university radio astronomy group, discovered the first four pulsars, leading to a Nobel Prize for her supervisor, and, ultimately, for Bell Burnell herself, a position as a research professor at the University of Oxford.

In 1975, the college's President Rosemary Murray became the first woman to hold the post of vice-chancellor of the University of Cambridge. Two subsequent presidents, Anne Lonsdale and Jennifer Barnes, have become pro-vice-chancellors of the University.

Following a 2005 donation of £30 million by alumna Rosalind Edwards (née Smith) and her husband Steve Edwards to secure its future, in early 2008 New Hall was renamed Murray Edwards College, honouring the first president, Dame Rosemary Murray, and the benefactors. There was some opposition to this as the new name incorporated a man's surname, despite the college being reserved for women students. Ros Edwards had attended the college in the 1980s and made a fortune with her partner when their software company Geneva Technology was sold to Convergys in 2001.

Men-only Cambridge colleges were converted into mixed-sex colleges in the 1970s and 1980s. Since the 2006 announcement that the University of Oxford's last remaining women-only college, St Hilda's, would also admit men, Cambridge is the only United Kingdom university that partially maintains a female-only student admissions policy, represented by Newnham and Murray Edwards. The fellowship and staff at Murray Edwards College are recruited from all genders. There is no bar to male students frequenting the college and many are taught there by Murray Edwards' fellows.

== Arms and logo ==
New Hall received its Royal Charter in 1972. The Arms of the college are emblazoned as follows:

Sable a Dolphin palewise head downwards to the dexter in chief three Mullets fesswise a Bordure embattled Argent

In plain English, this means: on a black background, place the following features in silver. Vertically in the centre, place a dolphin with head downwards to the left. On top, place three stars horizontally across. Bordering the arms, place a square wave representing the battlements of a castle.

The black castellation round the arms marks the college's location on Castle Hill. The three stars are borrowed from the Murray coat of arms, while the heraldic dolphin symbolises a youthful spirit of exploration and discovery, and a kindly intelligence.

The college had designed a new logo to mark its transition from New Hall to Murray Edwards College. It was based on the design of the interior of the dining hall (the "Dome") and was called the 'spark'. However, on consultation with its alumnae, the college decided to continue to use its arms in official materials.

== Buildings and grounds ==
Like many of the other Cambridge colleges, Murray Edwards College was not built all at one time but expanded as the need arose, over several time periods. The college therefore has several accommodation blocks of differing styles. In order of construction:

- Orchard Court (also known as Old Block) recalls the name of the grounds now occupied by the college, which was The Orchard, a large house part-owned by Norah Barlow, granddaughter of Charles Darwin. It is divided into the Wolfson, Nuffield and Spooner Wings, named after donors to New Hall during its first few decades. Part of the original structure was designed in the 1960s and completed in 1965. In 2009, part of this block was refurbished to improve fire safety and living standards. Some student rooms are split across two levels, meaning they have a bedroom upstairs and a separate living space downstairs. Many of the rooms have access to a shared balcony.
- Pearl House (formerly known as New Block), named after Valerie Pearl, the second president of the college. The building was constructed with funding from the Kaetsu Foundation. All rooms are en suite. Wheelchair access is available to each floor via the central lift. Opened in 1994, this is where first year undergraduates are accommodated. Unlike most colleges at Cambridge, the building offers fully equipped kitchens, baths and a lift.
- Buckingham House. The current building was a replacement for another building of the same name that stood on this site, and was opened in 2001. All rooms are en suite. The building is wheelchair accessible and has a lift. Contains a 142-seat auditorium which is used for lectures, film festivals and concerts.
- Canning and Eliza Fok House is named after the Hong Kong entrepreneur Canning Fok and his wife Eliza Fok, who donated the funds for constructing this accommodation block. All rooms are en suite. The building is wheelchair accessible and has a lift. Opened in 2008. Canning and Eliza Fok House is specifically built to accommodate the growing population of graduate students at Murray Edwards, and has a large shared kitchen/living area between eight bedrooms.

The first buildings of the college on Huntingdon Road were designed by the architects, Chamberlin, Powell and Bon, and are listed Grade II* (particularly important buildings of more than special interest). This includes:

- The Dome, which features some of the artwork the college is famed for, as well as a rising servery (a bar that rises from the floor for special events). This is where the cafeteria is located. Students take their meals here, including Saturday and Sunday brunch, often cited as the best brunch in Cambridge. Formals are held here, once a week on a Tuesday.
- Fountain Court, which can be accessed from the bar and looks into the library, and features an illuminated fountain and waterways. Tables and chairs are put out there in warmer months as well as displays of flowers.
- The Library, which was designed to reflect the interior of a Cathedral. Students can request heaters, blankets, tea, coffee and biscuits as they study. Yoga sessions, arts and craft and a variety of other welfare events are held here and it is open 24/7.

=== Gardens ===
The college gardens have an informal style, initially planned and planted by the first president, Dame Rosemary Murray. The gardens include a greenhouse originally belonging to the estate of the Darwin family, where banana plants are grown during the winter months.

In 2007, Murray Edwards College (then New Hall) became the first Cambridge College to participate in the RHS Chelsea Flower Show. The theme of the presented garden was the Transit of Venus, and was awarded a Bronze Flora medal in the Chic Garden Category. After the show, this garden was recreated in a slightly larger form beside the library.

As part of the Cambridge tradition of May Week, the college hosts an annual garden party that is popular with students from across the university. The garden party features a new theme each year and is well received by those in attendance. In Michaelmas (the Autumn/ Winter term), the college celebrates 'Apple Day' in the gardens, a day of autumnal activities such as apple picking, cooking, crafting and bonfires.

The students at Murray Edwards are encouraged to enjoy the gardens and walk on the lawns, meaning it is common to spot students sunbathing, studying, taking picnics or even relaxing on the small beach that is erected in the summer. The gardens are maintained by professional staff, and recently also by fellows and students. Since 2012, gardening allotments have been provided for fellows, undergraduates and postgraduates for growing herbs and vegetables, in addition to the flowers and herbs already planted by the gardeners.

== Studentships ==
The college maintains a fund for graduate research, including the Stephan Körner graduate studentship for studies in philosophy, classics or law.

== The Women's Art Collection ==
Murray Edwards is home to The Women's Art Collection (known until 2022 as the New Hall Art Collection), the largest collection of women's art in Europe, and the second largest in the world (the largest being the National Museum of Women in the Arts in Washington, D.C.).

The artwork can be seen throughout College, and students are encouraged to request pieces to be brought into their bedrooms as decoration.

The New Hall Art Collection was started in the early 1990s, when New Hall had few pieces of art and most of them were portraits of old gentlemen. The college president asked 100 women artists to each donate one piece of art, and more than 75% of them agreed. Donations have continued since, and the collection now contains work by many famous women artists, including:

- Gillian Ayres
- Fiona Banner
- Wilhelmina Barns-Graham
- Sandra Blow
- Helaine Blumenfeld
- Judy Chicago
- Eileen Cooper
- Tracey Emin
- Mary Fedden
- Elisabeth Frink
- Guerrilla Girls
- Maggi Hambling
- Barbara Hepworth
- Nicola Hicks
- Lubaina Himid
- Chantal Joffe
- Mary Kelly
- Cornelia Parker
- Emily Patrick
- Barbara Rae
- Gwen Raverat
- Paula Rego
- Shani Rhys James
- Bridget Riley
- Cindy Sherman
- Julia Sorrell
- Jo Spence
- Rose Wylie

== Notable alumnae ==
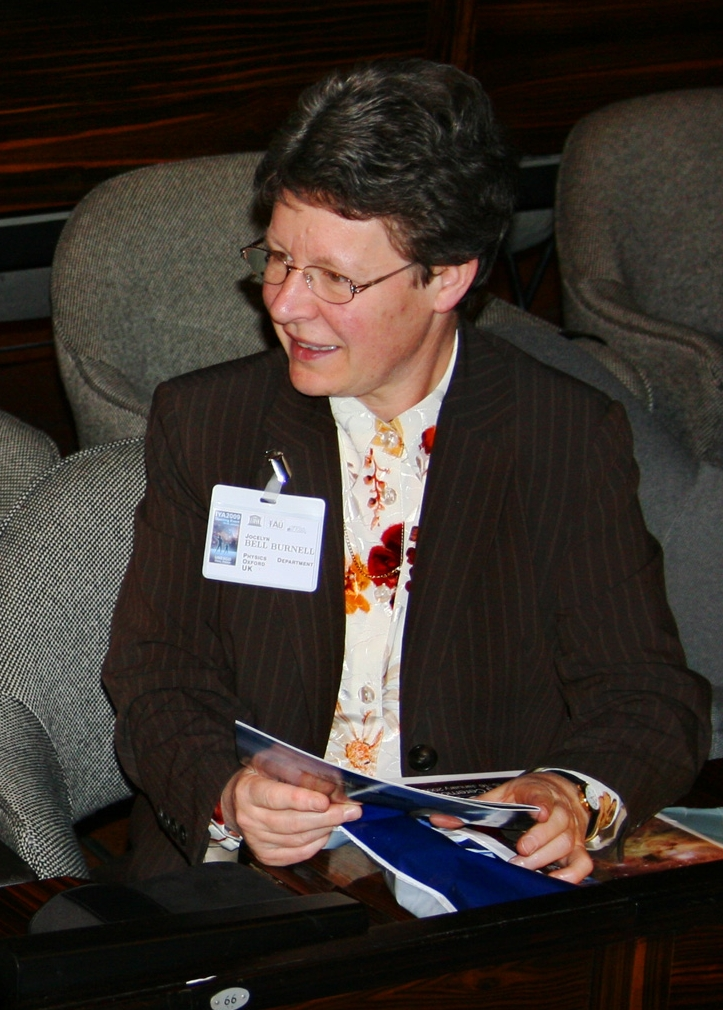
Astrophysicist Dame Jocelyn Bell Burnell

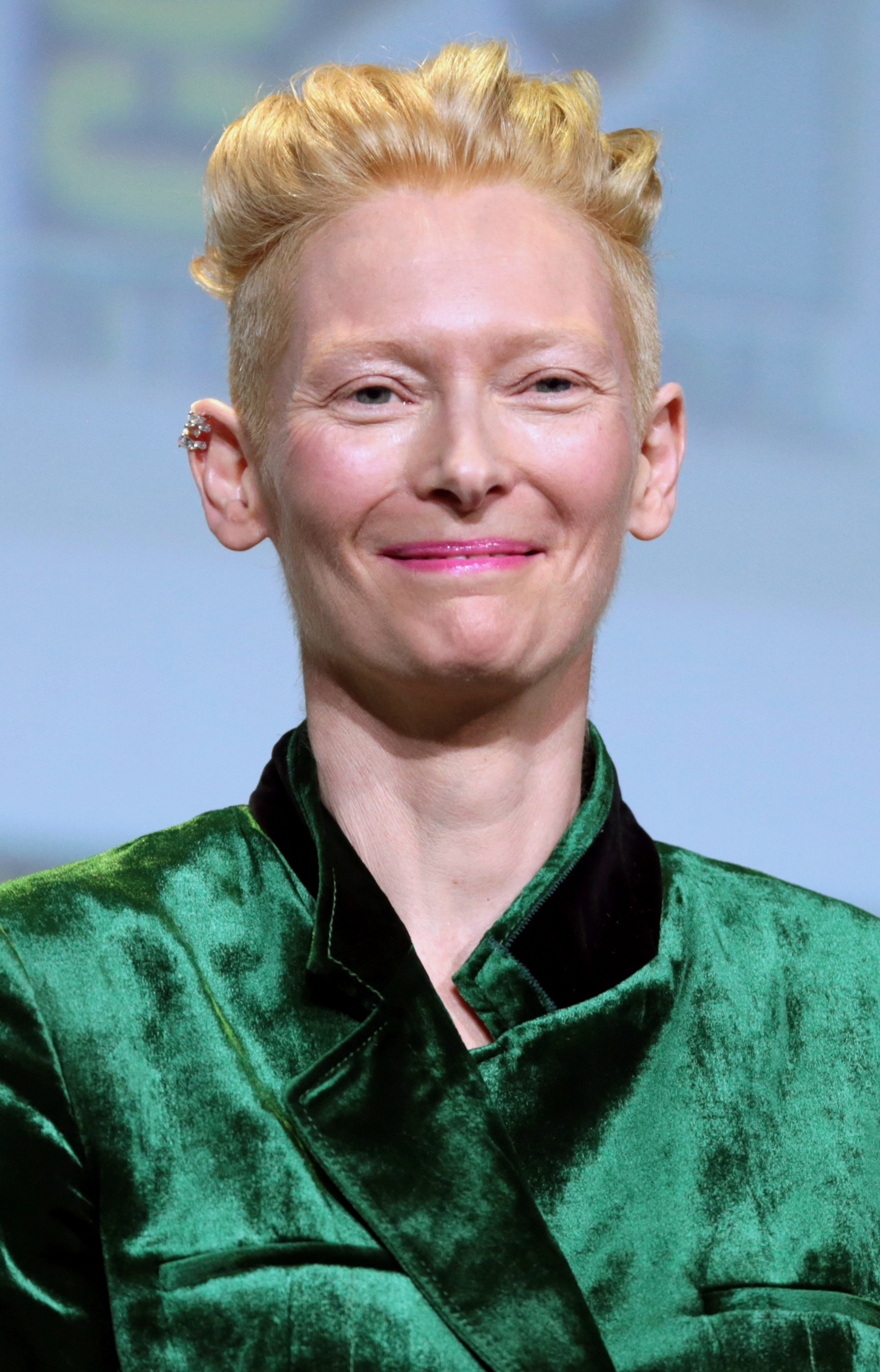
Oscar-winning actress Tilda Swinton

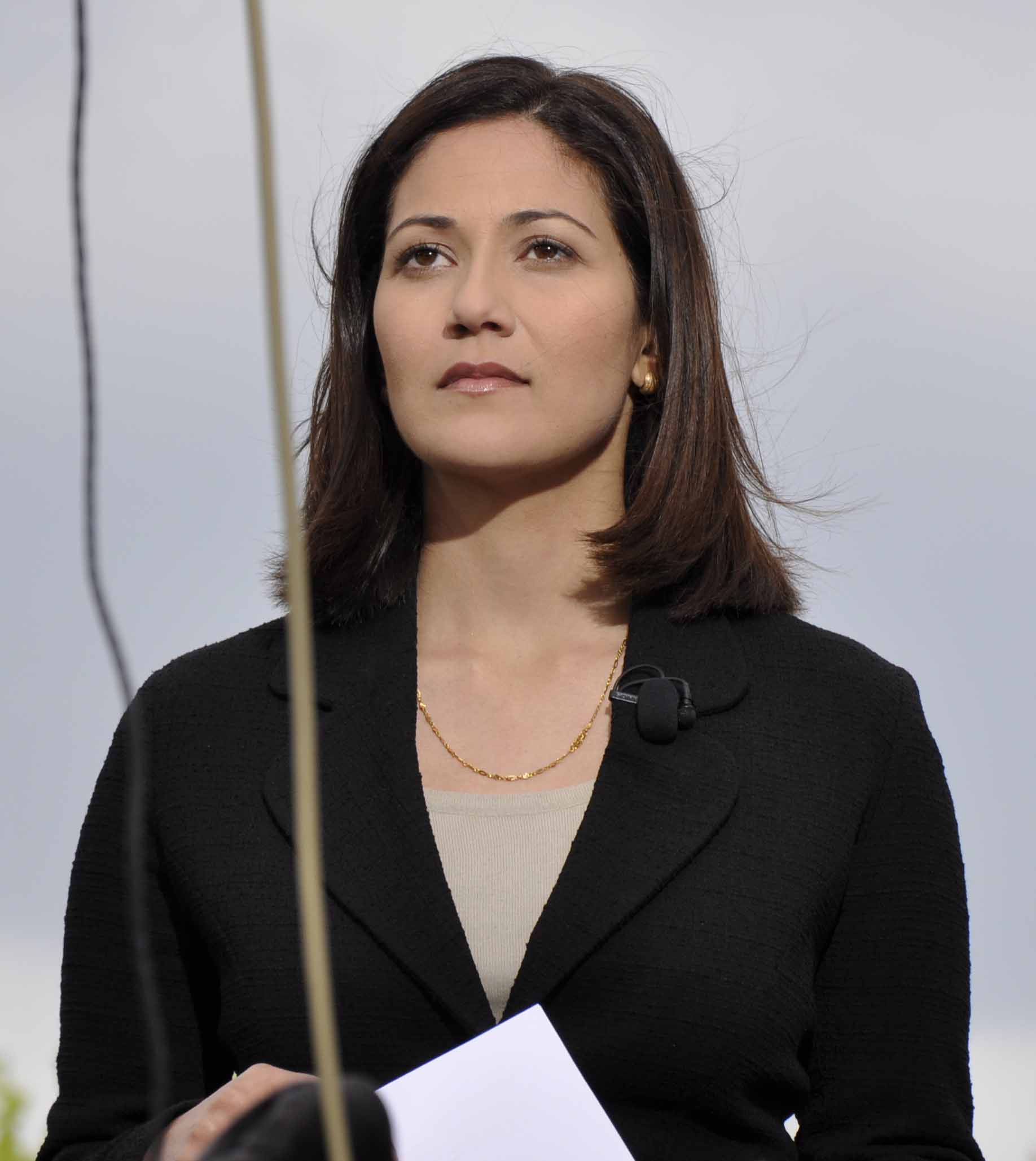
BBC journalist Mishal Husain

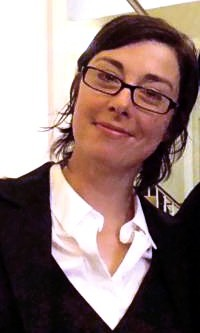
Comedian Sue Perkins

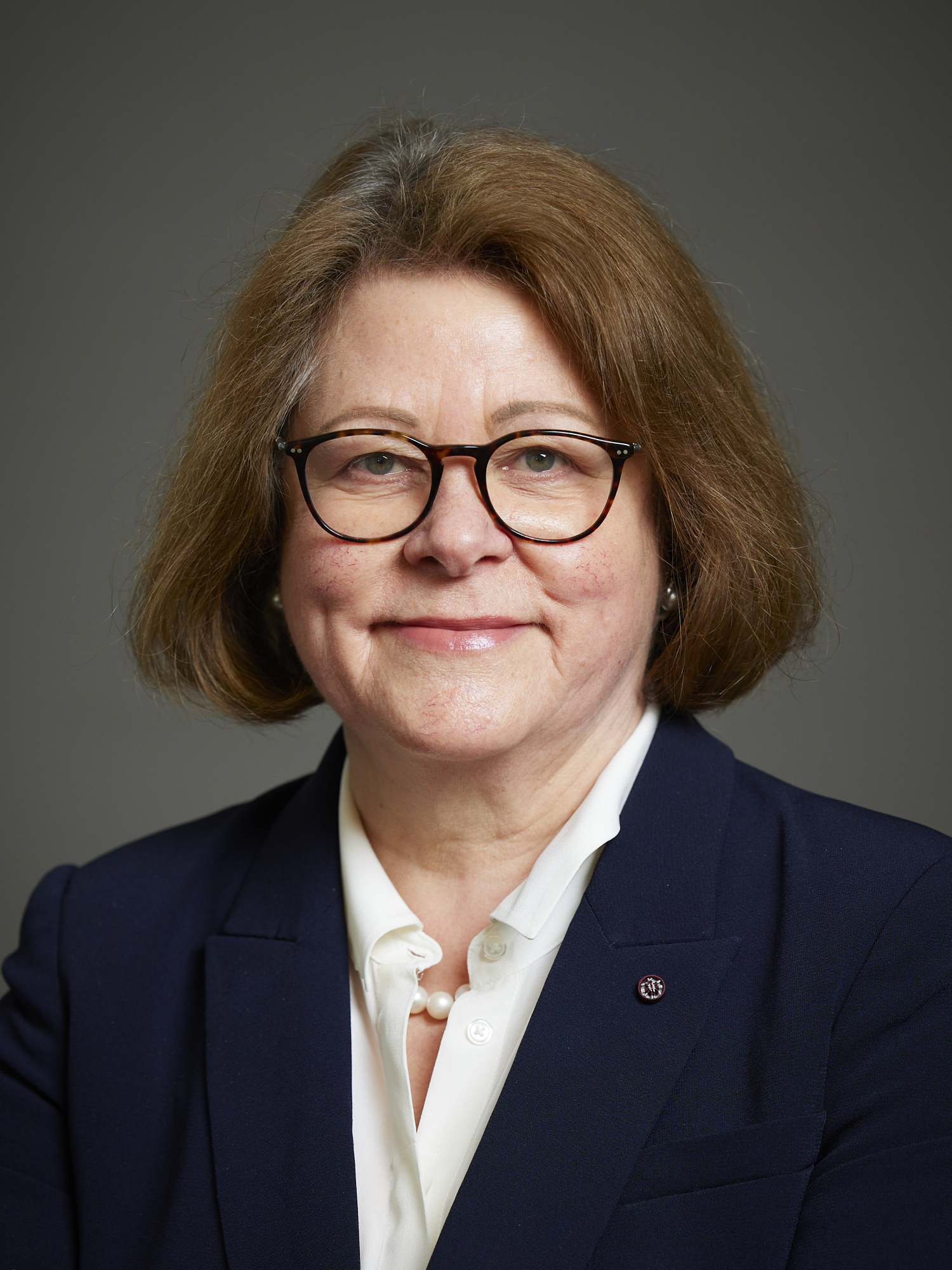
Engineer and Baroness Julia King

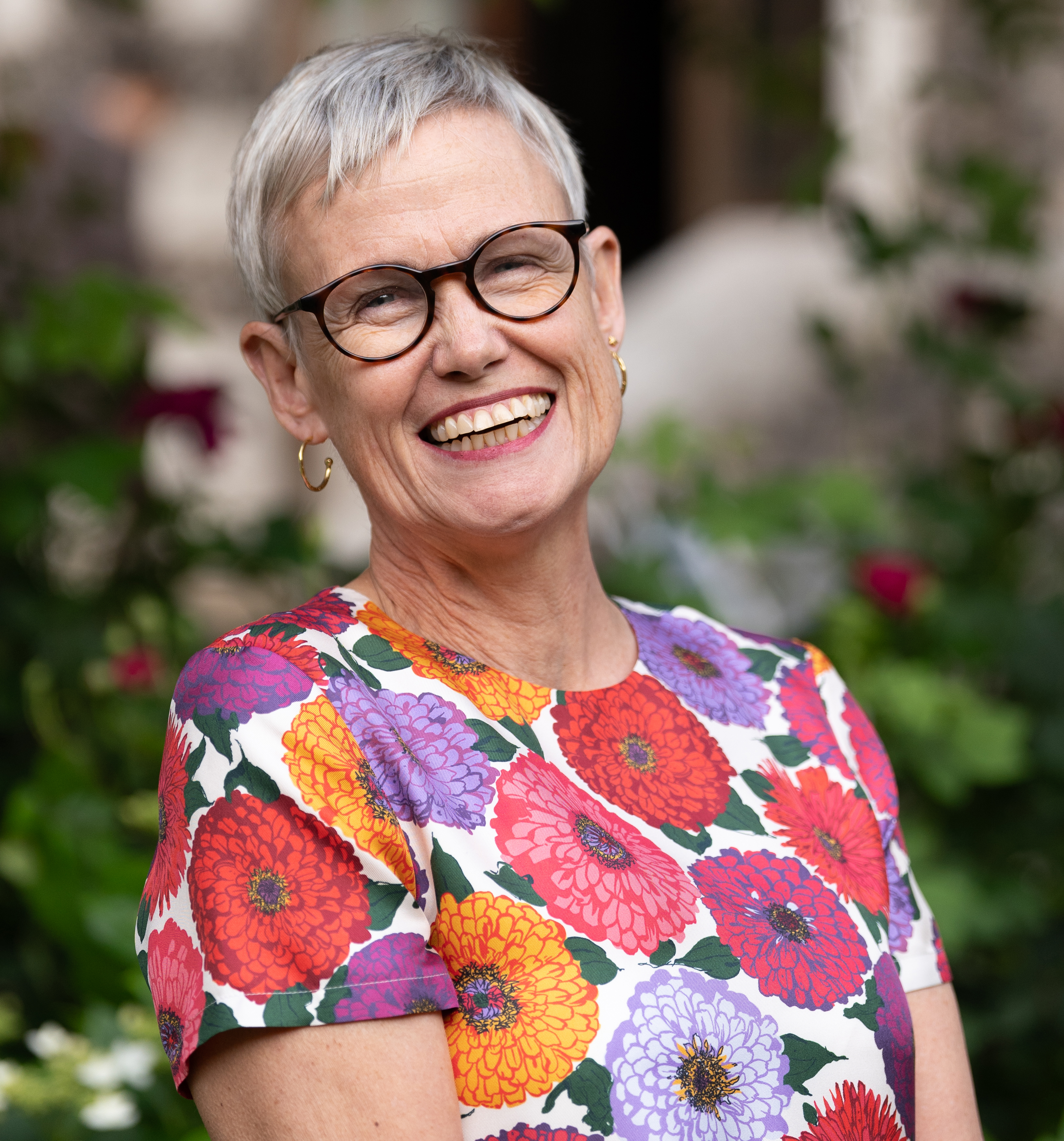
Diplomat Alice Walpole

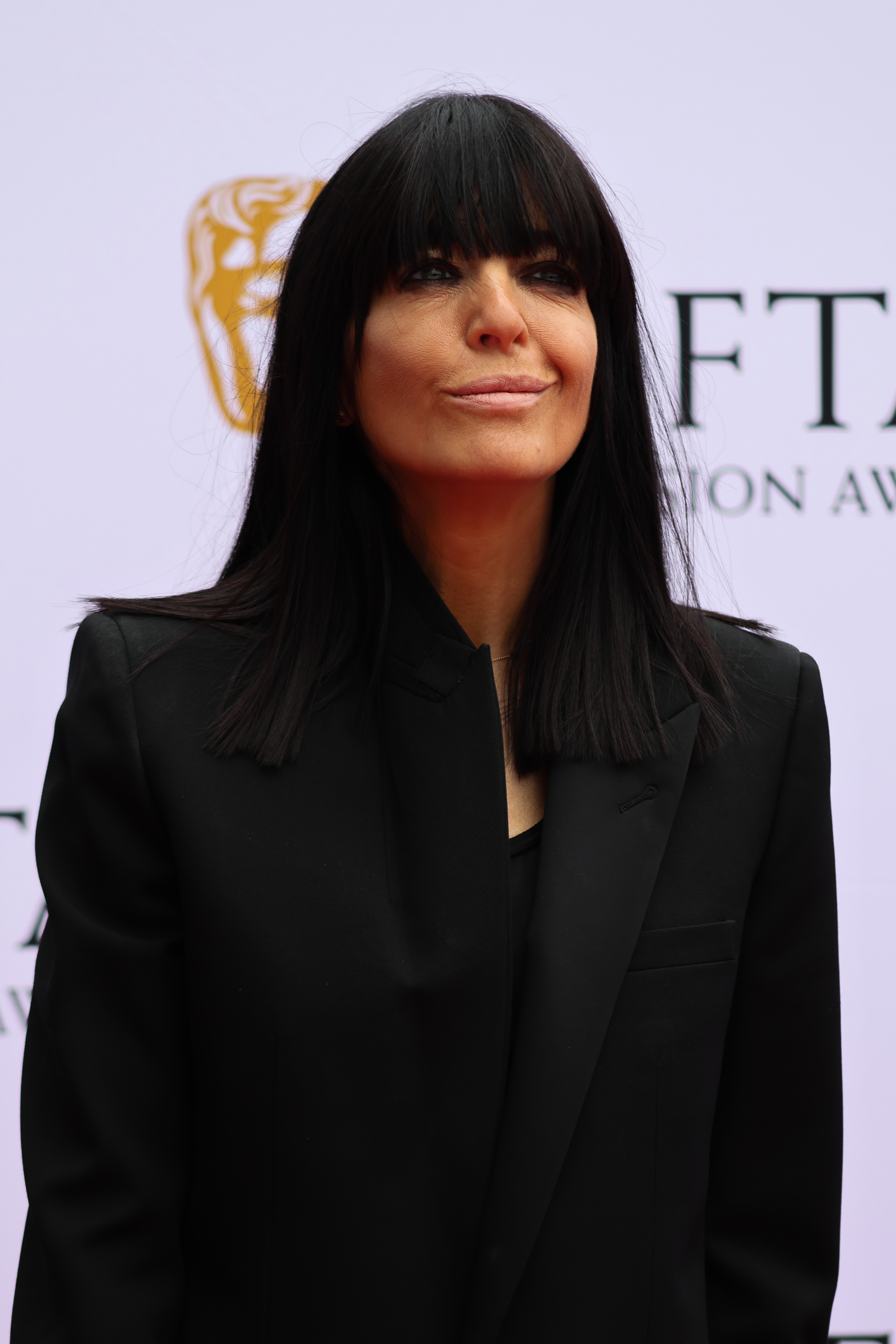
Broadcaster Claudia Winkleman
- Manel Abeysekera, diplomat
- Haleh Afshar, Baroness Afshar, professor in politics and women's studies at the University of York
- Bina Agarwal, professor of Development Economics and Environment, University of Manchester
- Celia Barlow, former BBC TV News intake assistant editor, former Labour MP for Hove and Portslade
- Gina Barreca, professor of English literature at the University of Connecticut, author
- Katherine Blundell, professor of Astrophysics, University of Oxford
- Dame Jocelyn Bell Burnell, astrophysicist who discovered the first four pulsars
- Sarah Coakley, theologian and philosopher
- Helen Cooper, literary scholar
- Frances Edmonds, best-selling author, broadcaster, and speaker
- Natalie Evans, Baroness Evans of Bowes Park, British politician
- Liv Garfield, chief executive of Severn Trent Water and youngest female CEO of a FTSE 100 company
- Amika George, activist and founder of the #FreePeriods campaign against period poverty
- Gillian Gill, writer and academic who specializes in biography
- Roma Gill, academic and literary scholar
- Siân Griffiths, British public health physician
- Lizzy Hawker, British endurance athlete
- Jane Heal, philosopher, emeritus professor
- Zoah Hedges-Stocks, journalist
- Angela Hobbs, philosopher, and professor of the Public Understanding of Philosophy at the University of Sheffield
- Alison Holmes, professor of Infectious Diseases, Imperial College London
- Mishal Husain, newsreader for BBC News
- Julia King, Baroness Brown of Cambridge, engineer and former vice-chancellor, University of Aston
- Clare Lawrence, actress
- Helen Macdonald, prize-winning author of H is for Hawk
- Joanna MacGregor, concert pianist, conductor, and composer
- Philippa Marrack, immunologist known for her T cell research
- Hattie Morahan, actress
- Serena Nik-Zainal, professor of Clinical Genetics
- Elizabeth Norton, writer and historian
- Maggie O'Farrell, winner of the 2020 Women's Prize for Fiction
- Sue Perkins, comedian
- Kate Pretty, former principal, Homerton College, Cambridge; former deputy vice-chancellor, Cambridge University
- Robin Raphel, American former diplomat, ambassador, CIA analyst, lobbyist, and an expert on Pakistan affairs
- Dame Jessica Rawson, art historian, former warden of Merton College, Oxford
- Helen Rees, Medical researcher
- Josie Rourke, artistic director of the Donmar Warehouse and film director
- Sonia Ruseler, Argentine news anchor
- Susan Sherratt, archaeologist
- Elizabeth Slater, professor of Archaeology at the University of Liverpool
- Sarah Solemani, English actress, writer and activist
- Sonya Stephens, president emerita, Mount Holyoke College, USA
- Dame Barbara Stocking, director of Oxfam, former president of the college (elected in 2013)
- Deborah Swallow, British educator, museum curator and academic
- Tilda Swinton, Academy Award-winning actress
- Camilla Toulmin, British economist and former director of the International Institute for Environment and Development (IIED)
- Carina Tyrrell, British-Swiss public health physician and former Miss United Kingdom of Miss World
- Frances Vernon, novelist
- Nicola Walker, actress
- Alice Walpole, former British diplomat
- Fiona Watt, professor, cell biologist and founding director of the Centre for Stem Cells and Regenerative Medicine
- Pat Willmer, professor emerita of biology, University of St Andrews
- Claudia Winkleman, TV presenter and journalist
- Vicki Young, chief political correspondent of BBC News

== See also ==
- Alumni of New Hall, Cambridge
- Fellows of Murray Edwards College, Cambridge
- Murray Edwards College Boat Club
- Listed buildings in Cambridge (west)
