= Rosemary Murray =

British chemist and academic

Dame Rosemary Murray DBE DL

Vice-Chancellor of the University of Cambridge
- In office 1975–1977
- Chancellor: Prince Philip, Duke of Edinburgh
- Preceded by: John Wilfrid Linnett
- Succeeded by: Alan Cottrell

Personal details
- Born: 28 July 1913 Havant, Hampshire, England
- Died: 7 October 2004 (aged 91) John Radcliffe Hospital, Oxford, England

Dame Alice Rosemary Murray, DBE, DL (28 July 1913 – 7 October 2004) was an English chemist and educator. She was instrumental in establishing New Hall, Cambridge, now Murray Edwards College, Cambridge, and was the first woman to hold the office of Vice-Chancellor of the University of Cambridge.

== Background ==
Rosemary Murray was born in Havant, Hampshire, the oldest of six children born to Admiral Arthur John Layard Murray, a scion of the Murray Publishing Family, and Ellen Maxwell Spooner, herself the daughter of William Archibald Spooner, Warden of New College, Oxford. After attending Downe House, Newbury, she studied as an undergraduate chemist and doctoral student at Lady Margaret Hall, Oxford. She completed a BA degree in 1936, and received a DPhil degree in 1938 for her research on aspects of isomerism.

== Teaching career ==
Rosemary Murray went on to hold teaching positions at the Royal Holloway College, the University of Sheffield and Cambridge. She served in various positions throughout her career:

- Lecturer in Chemistry, Royal Holloway College (1938–41)
- Lecturer in Chemistry, University of Sheffield (1941–42)
- Lecturer in Chemistry, Girton College, Cambridge (1946–54)
- Fellow, University of Cambridge (1949)
- Tutor, University of Cambridge (1951–54)
- Demonstrator in Chemistry, University of Cambridge (1947–52)
- Tutor in Charge, New Hall, Cambridge (1954–64)
- President, New Hall, Cambridge (1964–81)
- Vice-Chancellor, University of Cambridge (1975–77)
- President, National Association of Adult Education (1977–80)
- Governor and Chairman, Keswick College of Education (1953–83)

== World War II ==
While at the University of Sheffield (1941–1942) Murray did research on organic chemistry as part of a team working for the Ministry of Supply. In 1942, she joined the WRNS, rising to the rank of chief officer. She worked at Chatham barracks as chief officer directing demobilisation.

A 2013 BBC report describes a secret major control bunker, later buried beneath the lawns of Magee College, Derry, Northern Ireland. From 1941 this bunker, part of Base One Europe, together with similar bunkers in Derby House, Liverpool, and Whitehall was used to control one million Allied personnel and fight the Nazi U-boat threat. Murray was stationed at Base One Europe as WRNS Chief Officer and responsible for the welfare of 5,600 Wrens stationed at Londonderry.

== New Hall, Cambridge ==
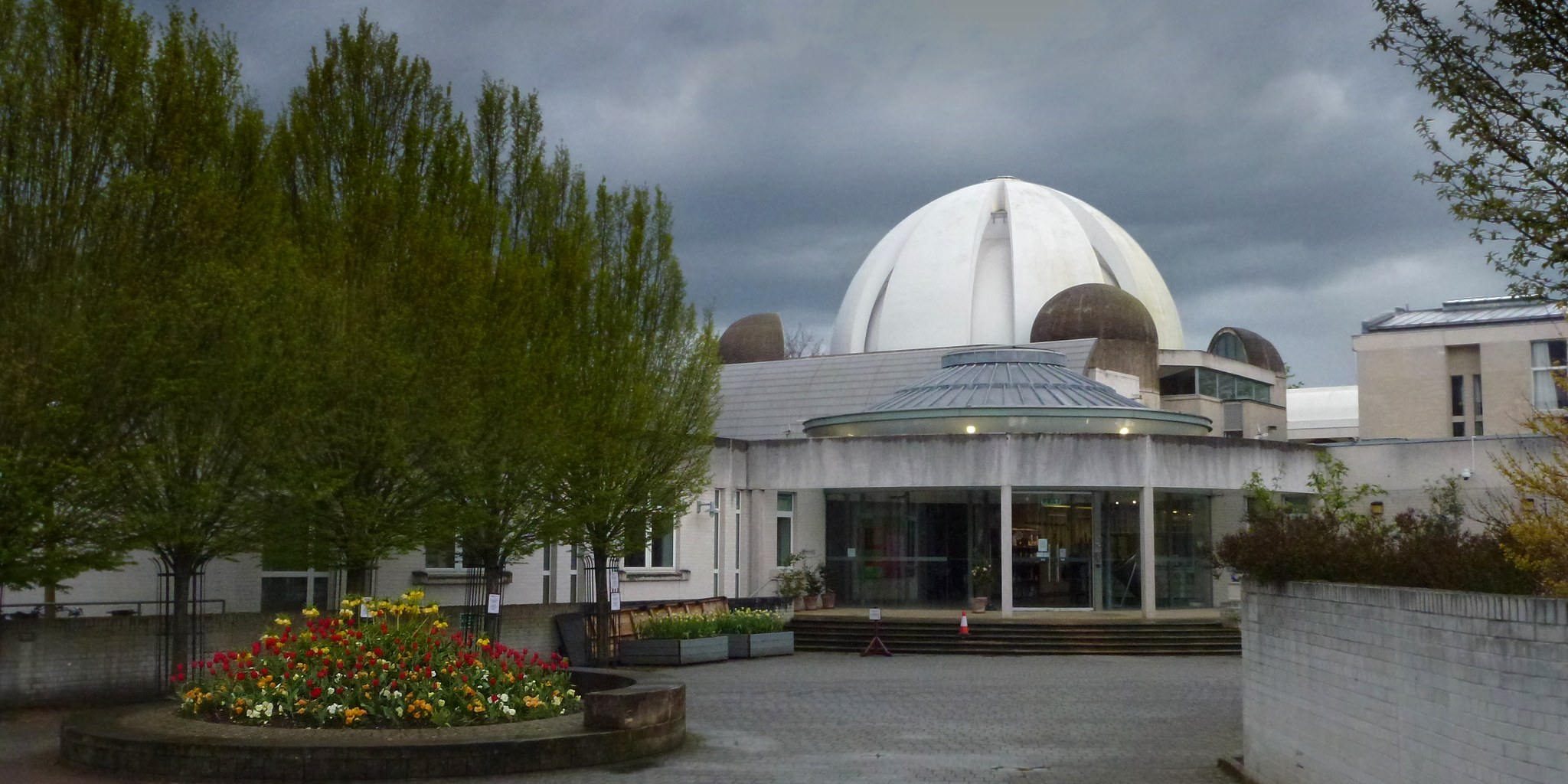
New Hall porters' lodge with dining hall dome in background

In 1946, the mistress of Girton College invited Murray to apply for a job at Cambridge. There, Murray played a major role in establishing New Hall, to address the needs of women students. She served as the first president of New Hall from its founding in 1954 until 1981.

In 1975 she became the University of Cambridge's first female vice-chancellor for a two-year term during which time she introduced student representation on university committees, founded the Cambridge Society, and inaugurated the clinical medical school, the new music school, and West Road concert hall.

In 1980, Murray published the booklet New Hall, 1954–1972: the Making of a College.

In 2008, it was announced that New Hall would be renamed Murray Edwards College, in honour of the vision of its first President, Rosemary Murray, and the generosity of the Edwards family.

== Town and gown ==
Murray was a magistrate in Cambridge for 30 years from 1953, and was the first female deputy lieutenant of Cambridgeshire in 1982. She was president of the National Association of Adult Education from 1977 to 1980. She was a member of the Committee on Higher Education in Northern Ireland chaired by Sir John Lockwood (1963–65), which recommended the closure of Magee College as well as the location of Northern Ireland's 2nd University being Coleraine (February, 1965) and led to the controversial creation of the New University of Ulster, from which she was later awarded a Doctor of Science (DSc) honorary degree (1972). She was a member of the Armed Forces Pay Review Body (1971–81). She was a director of Midland Bank Ltd (1978–84), and an independent director of The Observer (1981–93).

== Achievements ==
Dame Rosemary Murray was the first woman to serve as the following:

- Vice-chancellor of the University of Cambridge
- Founder President of the "third foundation" for women, New Hall, Cambridge
- Director of a clearing bank, the Midland Bank
- Liveryman in the Goldsmiths' Company
- Deputy Lieutenant for Cambridgeshire

== Honours and awards ==
- She was made a Dame Commander of the Order of the British Empire (DBE) in 1977.
- She received honorary degrees from universities in several countries:
  - Doctor of Science (DSc), The New University of Ulster, 1972
  - Doctor of Science (DSc), University of Leeds, 1975
  - Doctor of Science (DSc), University of Pennsylvania, Philadelphia, 1975
  - Doctor of Civil Law (DCL), University of Oxford, 1976
  - Doctor of Law (DL), University of Southern California, 1976
  - Doctor of Science (DSc), Wellesley College, 1976
  - Doctor of Laws (LLD), University of Sheffield, 1977
  - Doctor of Science(DSc), The Royal Australian Institute of Colleges, 1981
  - Doctor of Law (DL), University of Cambridge, 1988
- In 2004, a new rose was named in her honour at the Chelsea Flower Show.
- In 2008, New Hall, Cambridge was renamed Murray Edwards College, in her honour.
- In 2008, New Hall's Transit of Venus garden was rebuilt as the Dame Rosemary Murray Garden.

== Death ==
She died at the John Radcliffe Hospital in Oxford on 7 October 2004, aged 91, following a heart operation.

Academic offices
Preceded by None: new position	President of New Hall, Cambridge; 1954–1981	Succeeded by Valerie Pearl
Preceded by John Wilfrid Linnett	Vice-Chancellor of the University of Cambridge; 1975–1977	Succeeded by Alan Cottrell
