= Jennifer Barnes =

American academic; emigrant to the UK

- Born: Jennifer Chase Barnes; July 30, 1960 (age 66)
- Education: Smith College, Massachusetts; Royal College of Music, London; Goldsmiths, University of London
- Occupations: Saxton Bampfylde, Partner

Jennifer Chase Barnes (born 30 July 1960) is a musicologist and former university administrator. She was a Pro-Vice-Chancellor and Deputy Vice-Chancellor in the University of Cambridge, and the 4th President of Murray Edwards College, Cambridge in the United Kingdom.

== Early life and education ==
A former opera singer, she married Richard Edgar-Wilson in 1988. She completed her PhD at London University in 1996.

== Career ==
She was an associate professor at the Royal Academy of Music followed by an appointment as Project Director at the Royal College of Music (1996–99). She was appointed Head of Department (Academic) at Trinity College of Music in 1999 and promoted to Dean and Assistant Principal in 2001. The author of The Fall of Opera Commissioned for Television (2003), she is also recognized as a leading authority on the composers Gian Carlo Menotti, Thea Musgrave and Ethel Smyth.

In 1999 she established a Leverhulme research partnership between Imperial College, Manchester University and the Royal College of Music. Seeing the potential in wireless EEG biofeedback, she designed a program to analyze the role of alpha, beta and theta waves in musicians and dancers under performance stress. Subsequent findings have been integrated into the curricula of performing arts institutions worldwide.

In 2005 she was appointed the first group director of global education at BP. She produced an investment strategy which focused on capacity building, aligning higher education partners in STEM subjects, law and economics, to the annual corporate planning cycle and promoted greater investment in the university sector. She advised colleagues in over 25 countries on partnerships with governments, academic institutions, NGOs and business.

In 2008, she was elected the fourth president of Murray Edwards College, founded as New Hall, in the University of Cambridge. During her presidency, she worked with the Privy Council to resolve a pending court case with alumnae (triggered by the change of the College name), increased the Estate, raised academic standards and made key appointments to the Fellowship.

In 2010, she was appointed pro-vice-chancellor and a deputy vice-chancellor in the University of Cambridge. In 2016, at the end of her term, she became a partner in Saxton Bampfylde and holds board memberships in the UK, Europe and the Middle East.

Academic offices
Preceded by Anne Lonsdale	President of Murray Edwards College, Cambridge; 2008–2012	Succeeded by Ruth Lynden-Bell
Preceded by Dr Kate Pretty	Pro-Vice-Chancellor for International Strategy, Cambridge; 2010–2016	Succeeded by Professor Eilis Ferran
