= Sandra Blow =

English abstract painter

- Sandra Blow in 1955, photo by Ida Kar
- Born: Sandra Betty Blow; 14 September 1925; London, England
- Died: 22 August 2006 (aged 80); Truro, England
- Occupation: Artist
- Website: sandrablow.com

Sandra Betty Blow RA (14 September 1925 – 22 August 2006) was an English abstract painter and one of the pioneers of the British abstract movement of the 1950s. Blow's works are characteristically large scale, colourful abstract collages made from discarded materials.

Born in London, she suffered scarlet fever as a child, spending weekends and holidays at her grandparents' fruit farm in Kent. There she spent time painting, before enrolling at Saint Martin's School of Art between 1941 and 1946, and then the Royal Academy Schools, 1946–1947. She later enrolled at the Accademia di Belle Arti in Rome, where she met Alberto Burri, her partner of a few years. Blow and Burri travelled in Italy together before moving to and working in Paris, and Burri became a lifelong influence in her work.

== Early life ==
Sandra Betty Blow was born on 14 September 1925 in Newington, London. She came from a Jewish family; her father, Jacob (Jack), who was a fruit wholesaler, and her mother, Leah (Lily) née Rubinstein, had three children, Sandra was the second. During her childhood, Blow spent weekends and holidays in Kent at her grandparents' fruit farm.

In 1934, Blow suffered with scarlet fever, followed by rheumatic fever, from which her heart never fully recovered. After attending a local primary school, Blow was educated at a private girls school. At the age of fourteen, Blow was evacuated with her mother and two brothers to Paddock Wood in Kent, near her grandparents' fruit farm, where she spent her time reading, drawing and painting. (Note: A precautionary safety measure. Britain declared war on Germany 3 September 1939.Crozier, Andrew J. (2013). "Sir Neville Bowles Chamberlain". Oxford Dictionary of National Biography (online ed.). Oxford University Press. doi:10.1093/ref:odnb/97353. (Subscription, Wikipedia Library access or UK public library membership required.))

After leaving school at 14, Blow enrolled at Saint Martin's School of Art in 1941, where she studied until 1946 under teachers including Ruskin Spear. During this time she joined the artists' social scene, meeting people such as Lucian Freud, John Minton and Francis Bacon. She spent a short period in 1947 at the Royal Academy schools, but found the teaching dull, so instead travelled to Italy to study classic art. There she was inspired by Nicolas Carone to enrol at Accademia di Belle Arti in Rome. There she met Alberto Burri, with whom she began a relationship that would influence her work for the rest of her life and they travelled together in Italy during 1948.

After Italy, Blow travelled in Spain and France and she and Burri worked together in Paris during 1949, but finding Burri's influence too overwhelming, Blow returned to the UK in 1950 to pursue her work free of his influence. The pair would create works in response to the each other throughout the 1950s and 60s while Burri rose to international recognition. Blow faced the challenge of not only establishing herself as a woman artist in the 1950s but also as an abstractionist. The first sale of any of her works was to Roland Penrose, a founder of the Institute of Contemporary Arts, which proved to be a pivotal moment in her career.

Blow's success further changed when the leading London gallery, Gimpel Fils, began representing her work from 1951. Under Gimpel Fils, Blow had regular exhibitions and secured her first solo show in New York. The gallery also represented St Ives artists, including Barbara Hepworth, beginning Blow's life-long connection with the British coastal town. In 1957, Blow moved to St Ives for one year and would return there years later to live permanently.

In 1961, Blow began teaching painting at the Royal College of Art, where she remained until 1975 and earned a position as honorary fellow, whilst also painting in her studio in Chelsea, London. She was elected to the Royal Academy in 1978.

== Artwork ==
Space and Matter, 1959, Tate Gallery. Typical of Blow's work, employing collage effects with unorthodox materials such as liquid cement, chaff and charcoal.

After her structured training at Saint Martin's, Blow was influenced by Nicolas Carone and his approach to colour and space. He in turn had been influenced by Hans Hofmann. Blow was also influenced by Alberto Burri, who was progressing towards abstract art informel, using materials such as sacking. Blow and Burri started a relationship, and travelled together throughout Italy during 1948, influencing each other's styles. It was through him that she started to use "poor" non-art materials, as seen in her painting Space And Matter in which she used liquid cement plus chaff and charcoal, but his lasting influence was in his commitment to art and his interest in the different textures of the world.

Blow's work was at the forefront of the British abstract art movement of the 1950s. She was one of the most original woman painters in Britain, challenging the "'macho' cult" surrounding abstract art. Her works emphasise surface textures, creating a tactile quality, and tend to use simple, large geometric shapes. Blow would regularly use collage effects in her paintings and in her early work, would sometimes dye her canvas with tea to produce natural colours. Blow's later works would demonstrate a greater use of colour and simple, geometric forms. One well-known piece by Blow, illustrating her improvisatory approach to the use of materials, Space And Matter, 1959, is a painting of oil on board plus other experimental materials, creating the impression of wood and tar as well as flame and sea spray. In the 1970s, Blow collaborated with architect Eric Defty on a series of paintings. This collaboration saw Blow begin to incorporate geometric shapes among her organic forms in her later paintings and turn increasingly to square canvases as an architectural component of her work.

Blow's work was widely exhibited during her lifetime. Notable exhibitions of her work include sales made to the Museum of Modern Art and the Tate Gallery, the 1958 Venice Biennale, the 1960 Guggenheim International Award (which she won), the 1961 Liverpool John Moores University exhibition and at the Victoria and Albert Museum. Despite moving to St Ives in the 1990s, Blow continued working in London, participating in the Royal Academy's Summer Exhibitions and being honoured with a retrospective in the newly completed Sackler Galleries in 1994. In 1995, she completed her "only large scale experimentation with glass", an illuminated glass screen named Flight Structure, which was installed in Terminal 3 of Heathrow Airport. This was installed by the airside entrance and the artist styled the work to convey the transition from security to flight. It has now been moved to the airport's head office in the Compass Centre. In 2001–2002, Space and Matter, became the title of an exhibition of Blow's work at Tate St Ives.

In 2023 her work was included in the exhibition Action, Gesture, Paint: Women Artists and Global Abstraction 1940-1970' at the Whitechapel Gallery in London.

== Later life ==
Blow lived in a flat in South Kensington, London, since the 1960s but was forced to move due to rising rents. In 1994, she moved to St Ives, Cornwall, and there have been retrospectives of her work at the Royal Academy and Tate St Ives. Blow never had children, which had been a purposeful decision in her twenties, but she later regretted it. Blow died at the Royal Cornwall Hospital after a heart valve replacement operation resulted in a cerebral haemorrhage.

== See also ==
- List of St. Ives artists
