= Arena Racing Company =

British racecourse owning group

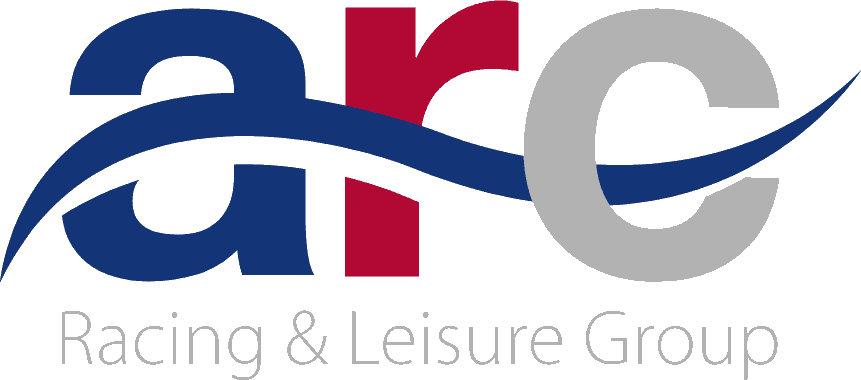
- Type: Private
- Industry: Leisure, horse racing, greyhound racing
- Predecessor: Arena Leisure, Northern Racing
- Founded: 2012
- Headquarters: Millbank Tower, London, England
- Key people: David Thorpe (chairman)
- Owner: David and Simon Reuben via Reuben Brothers
- Website: arenaracingcompany.co.uk

Arena Racing Company, also called ARC Racing and Leisure Group is a British private company, created in 2012 by the merger of Arena Leisure and Northern Racing. It owns and operates 16 racecourses in Great Britain, accounting for 39% of British racing fixtures. It also operates hotels at Wolverhampton Racecourse, Lingfield Park Racecourse and Doncaster Racecourse and golf courses at Lingfield, Southwell and Newcastle.

Following the purchase of Nottingham Greyhound Stadium in 2020 the company became the leading greyhound racing operator in the UK. In November 2022, it was announced Arena Racing Company had acquired the Athens-headquartered omni-channel content distributor, Vermantia.

== Personnel ==
The chief executive officer is Martin Cruddace who was formerly the chief legal officer for Betfair. Cruddace is a member of the Racehorse Owners Association.

David Thorpe was appointed chairman in April 2014. He was previously Chairman of Arena Leisure plc, as well as the Racecourse Association Ltd.

In 2017 The Times published an investigative report in which current and former Arena Racing employees raised concerns about working and safety conditions.

== Racecourses ==
Arena Racing Company operates seventeen racecourses in Great Britain:

- Bath
- Brighton
- Chepstow
- Chelmsford City
- Doncaster
- Ffos Las
- Fontwell Park
- Great Yarmouth
- Hereford
- Lingfield Park
- Newcastle
- Royal Windsor
- Sedgefield
- Southwell
- Uttoxeter
- Wolverhampton
- Worcester

After the purchase of Ffos Las in May 2018, ARC also expressed interest in acquiring Towcester racecourse and greyhound track.

In August 2018, owners of Arena Racing, David and Simon Rubens, announced plans for a multi-million-pound redevelopment of Newcastle Racecourse and High Gosforth Park. Changes might include a new events centre at Newcastle and a residential development at High Gosforth Park.

== Greyhound tracks ==
In May 2017 ARC acquired both Sunderland Greyhound Stadium and Newcastle Greyhound Stadium from William Hill followed by the lease purchases of Belle Vue and Perry Barr Stadiums in October 2019 from GRA Acquisition. In 2020 Arc bought Nottingham Greyhound Stadium from Nottingham Greyhound Stadium Ltd.

In December 2025, ARC secured the lease at Mildenhall Stadium, with the management of the lease being overseen by Simon Franklin, Director of Yarmouth Stadium.

- Mildenhall Stadium (lease)
- Newcastle Stadium
- Nottingham Greyhound Stadium
- Sunderland Greyhound Stadium

== Television coverage ==
On 1 September 2016, seven independent racecourses (Fakenham, Ffos Las, Hexham, Newton Abbot, Plumpton, Ripon and Towcester) led by ARC (Arena Racing Company) started a television service known as The Racing Partnership (TRP). Racing from the six Arena courses including Doncaster, Southwell, Lingfield Park and Wolverhampton became available on TRP from 1 January 2017 with all other ARC and independent racecourses being added to the schedule over the following year. This service is a competitor to SIS (Sports Information Services) who since 1987 has been providing racecourse coverage into the LBO's.

== All-Weather Championships ==
As operators of three of the five All-Weather Racecourses in Britain, ARC were central to the launch of the All-Weather Championships in 2013. The All-Weather Championships run throughout October and climax on Good Friday at Lingfield Park Racecourse. The All-Weather Championships are sponsored by bookmakers Betway.

The racecourses involved in the All-Weather Championships are Chelmsford City, Kempton Park, Lingfield Park, Southwell and Wolverhampton in Great Britain as well as Dundalk in Ireland and Cagnes-sur-Mer and Deauville in France.

The All-Weather Championships are contested over seven categories:

- 3 Year Old Championships (8 furlongs)
- 3 Year Old Sprint (5 furlongs)
- Sprint Championships (6 furlongs)
- Mile Championships (8 furlongs)
- Marathon Championships (16 furlongs)
- Fillies & Mares Championships (7 furlongs)
- Middle Distance Championships (10 furlongs)

Finals Day is the richest All-Weather Raceday in Europe, with over £1million in prize money on offer.

To qualify to run on Finals Day, horses must run either a minimum of three times on the All-Weather surfaces in Great Britain, Ireland or France during the qualifying period and carry an Official BHA Rating high enough to enter or win a Fast Track Qualifier, which will guarantee free entry.
