= Stanley Clarke (businessman) =

British businessman (1933–2004)

Sir Stanley Clarke CBE
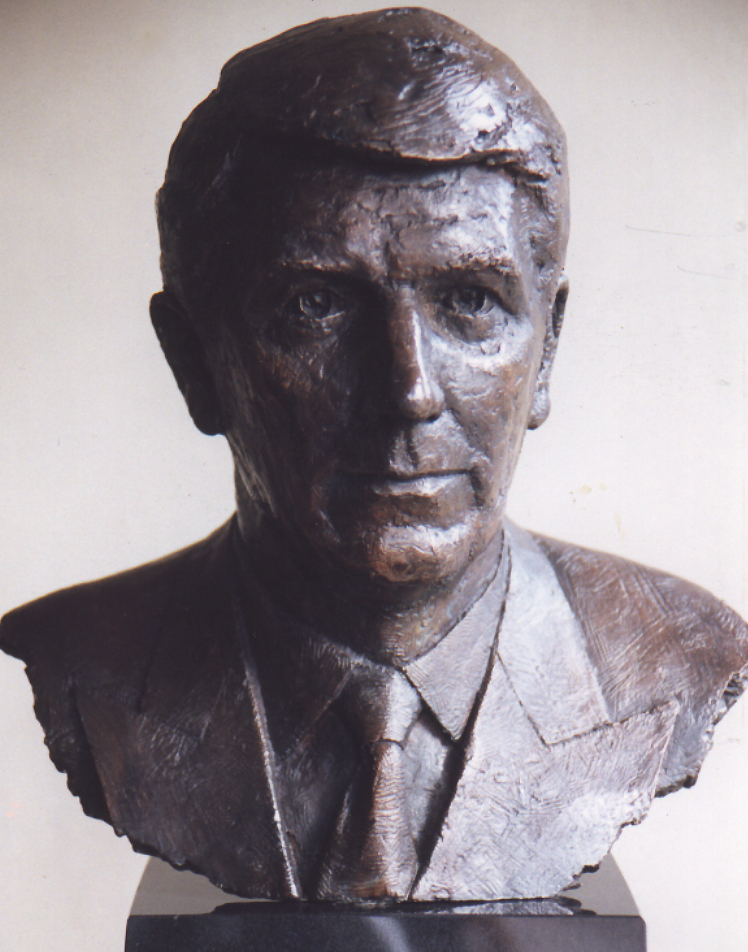
- A bust of Stanley Clarke sculpted by Steven Whyte in 1991
- Born: Stanley William Clarke; 7 June 1933; Woods Lane, Stapenhill, Burton upon Trent, Staffordshire, England
- Died: 19 September 2004 (aged 71); Barton-under-Needwood, Staffordshire, England
- Education: Burton Technical High School
- Occupations: Plumber, property developer, horse trainer, entrepreneur
- Known for: St. Modwen Properties; Northern Racing; Owner Lord Gyllene (Winner, 1997 Grand National)
- Spouse: Hilda Leavesley (m. 1957)
- Children: 4
- Awards: CBE (1990); Knight Bachelor (2001)

Sir Stanley William Clarke, CBE, DL (7 June 1933 – 19 September 2004) was an English businessman, property developer, horse racing enthusiast, and philanthropist.

== Early life ==
Stanley William Clarke was born in Woods Lane, Stapenhill, Burton upon Trent, Staffordshire, on 7 June 1933. His father, Victor, was previously a brewery worker, disabled by tuberculosis; while his mother, Mabel, was a maid at Dunstall Hall. To help his family financially, nine year old Clarke undertook a daily paper round before school, delivered prescription medication in the evenings, and on weekends, delivered meat for the local butcher. Clarke was thinking of leaving school to become a farmer's hand, but his father persuaded him to stay on at Burton Technical High School. Clarke's father died when Clarke was aged 11.

== Career ==
Aged 15, he became an apprentice plumber. Upon graduating, he started his own business. Working from a bicycle with a front carrier for his tools, he aimed to provide a better service, at a better price, than anyone else.

Aged 21, he agreed a deal with a local farmer to buy one acre of land. The farmer agreed to waive the purchase price of £125 until Clarke had gained planning permission, which he duly did and sold the land ownwards for £650 before paying for it.

=== St Modwen Properties ===
In 1966, Clarke and his brother-in-law Jim Leavesley set up the building firm Clarke Quality Homes, which he developed into a major regional house builder. Building more than 500 houses a year, it was the largest privately owned house-building and development company in the country. Clarke believed that quality was a prime requirement of any business or private enterprise, a notion which gained Clarke Homes six National House Building Council awards on different sites around the country in a single year.

In 1987, shortly before the property crash, they sold the house building side of the business to BICC subsidiary Balfour Beatty for £51 million, a company which at the time only had net assets of £6 million, and in which Clarke and his wife owned 80% of the company. Always ready to reward his staff for work well done, on completion of the sale he shared £12 million among all of the company's employees.

Renaming the residual business St Modwen, in 1986 the management reversed the business into Redman Heenan International plc, a listed former engineering concern that had become a shell company. At that time the name was changed to St. Modwen Properties plc. In the 1980s the company developed the 1986 Stoke-on-Trent Garden Festival site, Burton's Octagon Shopping Centre, the Britannia Stadium, and the Concorde Business Park near Manchester Airport.

The property crash of the early 1990s, brought a confrontation with NatWest bank:

Everyone was running scared, and the banks got after us. They said we've got to close offices, got to do a rights issue . . . I was so cross, I stood up to my full height . . . and I took my fist . . and I banged it down on the table. That's when we started the policy of using the rent roll to cover all dividends. They could never understand what we were doing, those City boys.

After this time the company began to concentrate on the development of brownfield sites as shopping centres, office buildings and industrial estates.

Before Clarke's death, St Modwen had acquired the 228-acre former MG Rover factory at Longbridge for £42.5 million, and 600 acres of disused land from Corus at Llanwern steelworks for £17.5 million. The company was named the best real-estate performer in Europe for 2002, and has a current stock market valuation of £400 million; Clarke's personal stake in the company was estimated to be worth £80 million.

== Horse Racing ==
=== Trainer ===
A devotee of horses and horse racing throughout his life, Clarke took out a trainer's licence in 1961. He sent out eight winners, before deciding to withdraw in 1966 in favour of breeding his own string of racehorses.

=== Owner and breeder ===
Clarke concentrated on breeding stock, and with his wife initially featured prominently on the point-to-point circuit, with good horses such as Mount Argus and Captain Frisk.

The couples black-and-white-striped colours featured on a number of notable National Hunt racing winners. He stabled a number of horses with Somerset-based Martin Pipe, who trained Rolling Ball, the Royal and SunAlliance Chase winner at Cheltenham racecourse in 1991. So excited was his wife by the success, that she fainted afterwards in the winner's enclosure.

In 1993, Lord Relic won the 1993 Challow Hurdle at Newbury Racecourse by 10 lengths.

The high point came in 1997, when his New Zealand-bred gelding Lord Gyllene (born 10 November 1988), trained by Steve Brookshaw and ridden by Tony Dobbin, won the 1997 Grand National at Aintree racecourse. The victory of Lord Gyllene is remembered as much for the circumstances surrounding the bomb threats and re-staging of the Grand National on the following Monday, as for his win itself. With a race record of 13 runs in the UK (won 4, second 5 and third once), Clarke retired the horse in 2001 due to injury.

His other notable horse was Barton, which trained by Tim Easterby won 14 out of his 20 races. Barton won the 1999 Royal & Sun Alliance Novices' Hurdle at the Cheltenham Festival, and is one of a few horses to defeat the triple Cheltenham Gold Cup winner Best Mate.

Clarke was an active director of the Racecourse Association and a director of the British Bloodstock Agency. In 1991 Clarke was elected a member of the Jockey Club.

=== Northern Racing ===
In 1988 Clarke acquired the lease on Uttoxeter racecourse from East Staffordshire district council. He invested in new grandstands, improving facilities for racegoers, jockeys, trainers and horses, and greatly increased prize money. He engaged customers, and requested feedback, including pinning up "How are we doing?" posters in the toilets.

The development of Uttoxeter formed the business model for Clarke's later seven purchases, each with a distinctive green and white livery as part of a re-branding that concentrated hugely on their having a "spotless" appearance. The group eventually included: Brighton; Fontwell Park; Yarmouth; Bath; Hereford; Sedgefield. After buying Newcastle Racecourse, Clarke appeared on the first race day in the Silver Ring, mounted a soap box and addressed the crowd. Telling them that having inspected the facilities he was less than impressed, and promised to put things right with investment. The punters responded with an enthusiastic ovation.

Naming the umbrella holding company Northern Racing, it was one of the first racecourse groups to negotiate directly with the bookmaking industry to secure a deal for transmitting pictures from their racecourses directly to Britain's betting shops, and later internationally.

In 2000, he took an 80% controlling stake in the Alternative Investment Market-listed Chepstow Racecourse plc. Installing himself as Executive chairman, one of his daughters as a director and his son as CEO, he reversed his existing seven other racecourses into the listed entity, renaming it Northern Racing plc.

== Philanthropy ==
Clarke was a notable philanthropist, both donating and raisining sums for various charitable causes.

Appointed chairman of the Lichfield Cathedral Trust in 1994, Clarke agreed to head an appeal to raise £2 million for repairs to the cathedral fabric. He then took on a second project to raise £4 million to make Lichfield Cathedral a centre of musical excellence, which included the restoration of the cathedral's 1884 William Hill church organ. At the time of his death, Clarke was chairing an appeal to raise £2.5 million to restore the 16th-century Flemish Herkenrode glass in seven of Lichfield Cathedral's windows.

In 18 months, Clarke raised £2 million for the Racing Welfare Charities. He then joined an £8 million chaired by the Princess Royal, for a new headquarters for the Animal Health Trust. Clarke also gave a large personal donation to a fund to rescue Burton Albion F.C. when it was facing financial ruin.

With his wife, Clarke was also contributed to medical and religious organisations. Although that to the Queen's Hospital Cancer Appeal is known, the majority of their donations, running into millions of pounds, were always made on the understanding that they should remain anonymous.

== Honours ==
Clarke was appointed CBE in 1990, and knighted in 2001. He was appointed as a Deputy Lieutenant (DL) for the County of Staffordshire on 2 October 2002. He was the High Sheriff of Staffordshire from 2003-2004.

== Personal life ==
Clarke married Hilda Leavesley in 1957, on his birthday. The couple had three daughters (Sally, Mary and Jane) and one son, Simon.

=== Dunstall Hall ===
In 1997 the couple bought Dunstall Hall for £4.5 million, a house set in 1,260 acres (510 ha) of land adjoining their existing estate at Barton-under-Needwood. Clarke had three personal connections to the house: the last owner was Sir Robert Douglas, who had given Clarke his first substantial plumbing job; the Hall was where his mother had worked in service; Clarke had poached game there as a boy.

Investing in the restoration of the Hall and grounds, which feature in a dedicated programme on Channel Five, the plan was to sustain its upkeep by turning it ito a conference, banqueting and wedding venue. The family also used it for entertaining, where Clarke would put on charity and celebratory events, engaging artistes including Acker Bilk, Ken Dodd, Ronnie Corbett and Paul Daniels. On one occasion, the band of the Staffordshire Regiment marched down the garden beating the retreat.

== Death ==
Clarke was diagnosed with bowel cancer in 2000, with polyps on his liver and lungs, and given three years to live. After a series of operations which removed three-quarters of his liver, he underwent chemotherapy. Pronounced in remission, in 2004 the cancer returned. He resigned his positions with St Modwen and Northern Racing, before dying at his home in Barton-under-Needwood on 19 September 2004.
