= Chepstow Racecourse =

Horse racing course in Monmouthshire, Wales

Chepstow

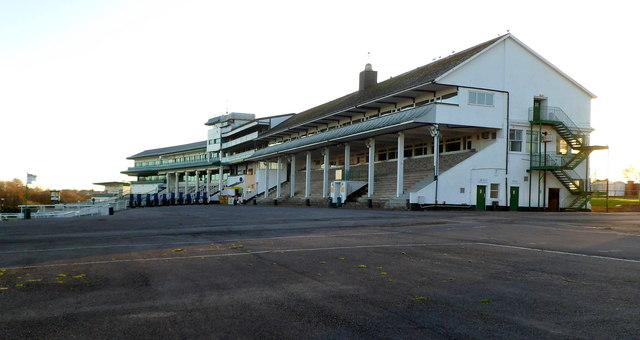
- The stands
- Interactive map of Chepstow
- Location: Chepstow, Monmouthshire
- Coordinates: 51°39′23″N 2°41′19″W
- Owned by: Arena Racing Company
- Screened on: Sky Sports Racing
- Course type: Flat; National Hunt

Chepstow Racecourse is a thoroughbred horse racing course located just north of the town of Chepstow in Monmouthshire, Wales, near the southern end of the Wye Valley and close to the border with England. It is one of 16 racecourses operated by the Arena Racing Company and is home of the richest race in Wales, the Coral Welsh Grand National.

== Track and facilities ==
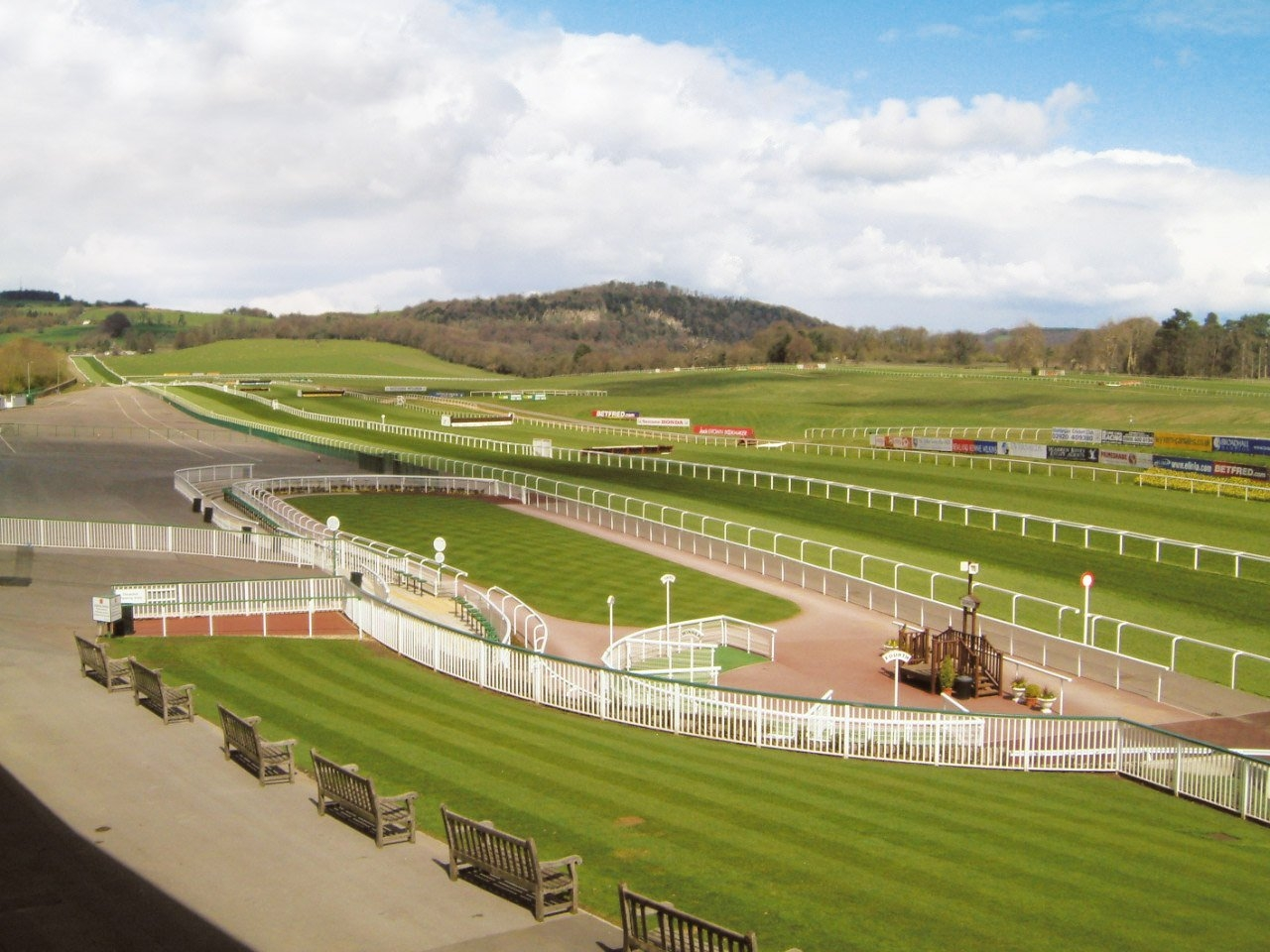
The parade ring and home straight

The track is a roughly oval circuit of just under 2 miles (3,200 m). It is a left-handed undulating course, used for both flat and jump racing. The finishing straight is about 5 furlongs (3,300 ft; 1,000 m) in length, with five fences on the chase course to be jumped. There are eleven fences on a complete circuit. There is also a straight mile course.

There are 29 fixtures in the 2024 calendar year including the two-day Unibet Jumps Season Opener on Friday 11 October and Saturday 12 October. This meeting features the Wasdell Group Silver Trophy (Handicap Hurdle) and the Grade Two Unibet Persian War Novices' Hurdle.

The richest race of the year, the Coral Welsh Grand National, takes place in late December. This meeting also features the Coral Finale Juvenile Hurdle,

Chepstow is one of three racecourses in Wales, the others being at Bangor-on-Dee and at Ffos Las. It is also used as a venue for numerous other indoor and outdoor events, such as concerts, weddings and conferences.

== History ==
Several places in South Wales had race meetings in the late nineteenth century and there had been racing at St Arvans, very close to the present course, between 1892 and 1914. In 1925 a group of ten South Wales gentry and businessmen, that included Courtenay Morgan, 1st Viscount Tredegar who was also Lord-Lieutenant of Monmouthshire, and Lord Queenborough; formed a company to purchase Piercefield House, and lay out a new racecourse in its estate. Despite struggling to raise enough cash, the racecourse was opened on 6 August 1926. The first race was a two-year-old seller won by Lord Harewood's colt Conca D'Oro, the 7-4 favourite. The two day flat race meeting had good prize money and was termed "The Welsh Goodwood".

The course nearly had to close down immediately after the first meeting and survived only thanks to a large bank loan guaranteed by the directors. Unforeseen extra costs in laying it out meant that it struggled financially for the first ten years of its existence and yet more contributions were needed from the directors. The first jump racing took place in March 1927. Since then the course has been used for flat racing in the summer and jumping in the winter. To begin with, the flat racing was more prestigious, with the Welsh Derby, Oaks and St Leger being run for good prize money. In 1933, at a two-day meeting, the multiple champion jockey Gordon Richards won eleven consecutive races at Chepstow – all six races on the first day and the first five races on the next, before being beaten in a close finish in the final race of the meeting.

=== RAF Chepstow ===
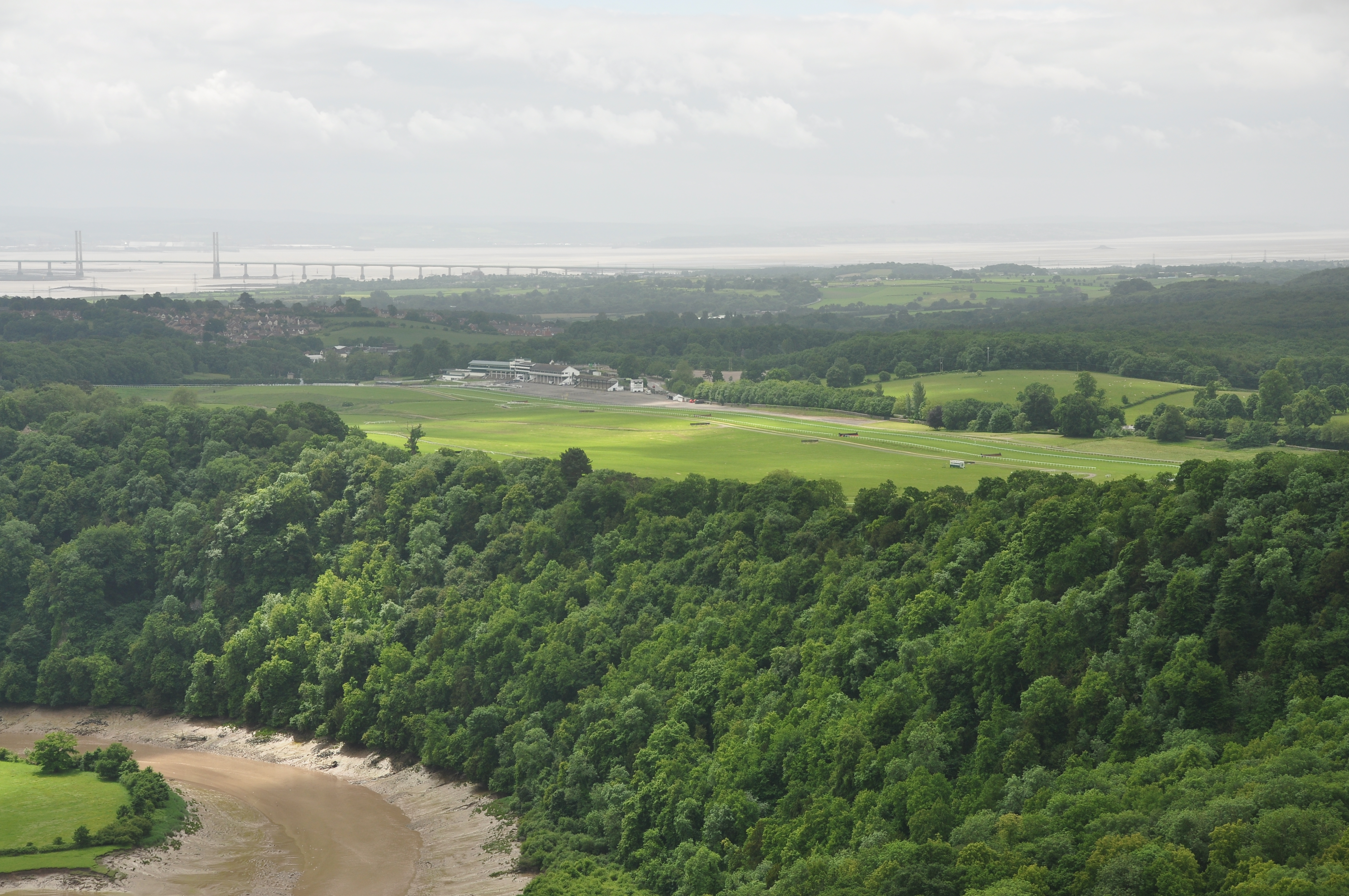
The racecourse as seen from the Wyndcliff, with the Severn Bridge in the background

During the Second World War, the entire site became designated as RAF Chepstow, an operational outpost of RAF St. Athan, No. 32 Maintenance Unit RAF and No. 19 Maintenance Unit RAF. Equipped with only a grass runway in the centre of the course, additional aircraft accommodation for bombers was created at Oakgrove on the opposite side of the road, accessed by stopping the traffic to allow the aircraft to cross. Types stationed on the course during the war included:

- Boulton Paul Defiant
- Hawker Hurricane
- Armstrong Whitworth Whitley
- Vickers Wellington
- Bristol Blenheim

=== Postwar ===
After the war and the demise of both Cardiff and the nearby Caerleon (Newport) course, the Welsh National was transferred to Chepstow in 1949. From then on, National Hunt racing overtook flat racing as the dominant activity as a string of good class horses and top trainers and jockeys contested the race. The three and three-quarter mile race, more recently known as the Coral Welsh National, owes much to the support of the bookmaking firm for establishing it as one of the major events in the National Hunt calendar. Coral have sponsored it for over forty years, making it the second longest continuous race sponsorship.

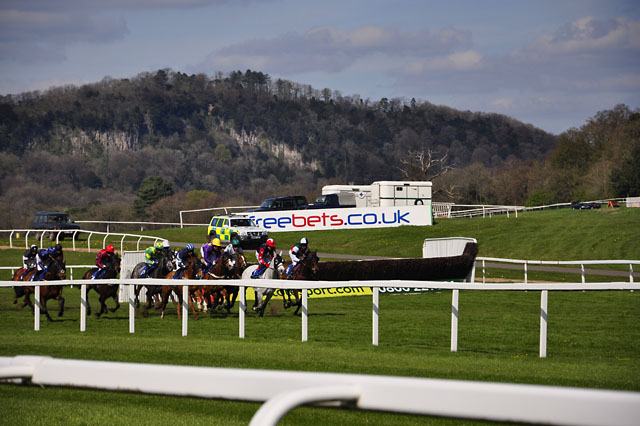
Horses travelling down the home straight

The opening of the Severn Bridge and the completion of the M4 motorway made the course more accessible to English racegoers.

The Clay family, which had bought Piercefield House in 1861, were involved with the management course since its formation. Listed on the AIM stock market as a plc in the late 1990s, Sir Stanley Clarke built up an 80% stake in the company and then reversed his existing Northern Racing racecourse holdings into the shell. Clarke took over as executive chairman of the Racecourse Company in 2000, resigning in 2003 before his 2004 death from cancer. Chepstow is now part of the Arena Racing Company, also called ARC Racing and Leisure Group, a private UK company, created in 2012 by the merger of Arena Leisure and Northern Racing. It owns and operates several racecourses.

== Notable races ==
Month	DOW	Race Name	Type	Grade	Distance	Age/Sex
October	Friday	Persian War Novices' Hurdle	Hurdle	Grade 2	2m 3½f	4yo +
October	Saturday	Silver Trophy Handicap Hurdle	Hurdle	Class 2	2m 3½f	4yo +
October	Sunday	Robert Mottram Memorial Trophy	Chase	Listed	2m 3½f	4yo +
October	Sunday	Welsh Champion Hurdle	Hurdle	Class 2	2m	4yo+
December	27th	Welsh Grand National	Chase	Premier Hcap	3m 6½f	4yo +
December	27th	Finale Juvenile Hurdle	Hurdle	Grade 2	2m	3yo only

Discontinued races

- Golden Daffodil Stakes (last run in 2005)

== Other events ==
Chepstow racecourse hosts concerts after evening race meetings:

- Madness played at the course in June 2013 and July 2015.
- Tom Jones performed in June 2014.
- UB40 appeared in May 2015.
- Simply Red performed in 2016
- Peter Andre performed in 2016
- Feeder performed in 2017
