= Folkestone Racecourse =

Racecourse in England

Coordinates: 51°5′38″N 1°2′1″E

Folkestone

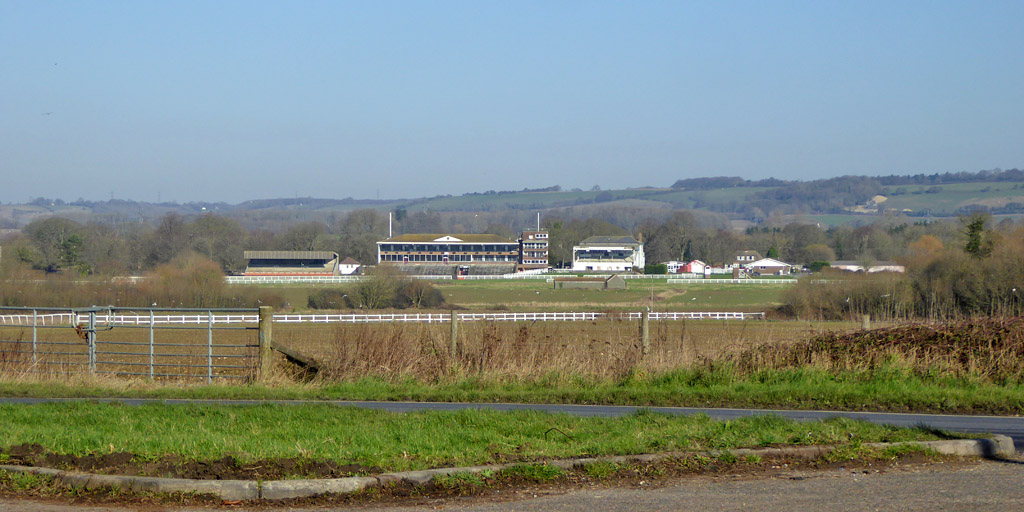
- The stands from afar in 2020
- Interactive map of Folkestone
- Location: Westenhanger, Kent
- Owned by: Arena Leisure Plc
- Screened on: At The Races
- Course type: Flat; National Hunt

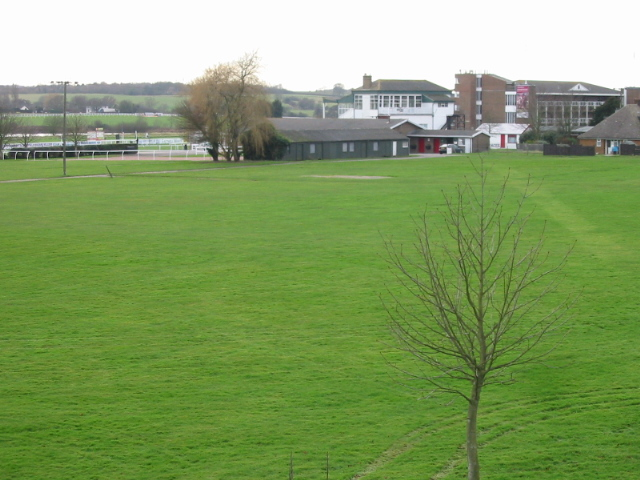
Grandstand seen from the station

Folkestone Racecourse was a thoroughbred horse racing venue in southeast England, until it closed in 2012. It is located in Westenhanger, by junction 11 of the M20 motorway and about 6 miles (9.7 km) west of Folkestone. The course remains closed and all running rail and steeplechase fences have been removed. In May 2016 it was revealed that the land covered by the racecourse forms part of a plan to develop and build housing. It is now unkempt and in a state of disrepair.

== History ==
The history of the Westenhanger estate dates back to 1035 when it was owned by King Canute. The 14th century Westenhanger Castle can still be seen next to the main grandstand.

The racecourse was established in 1898. The first meeting took place over two days on 30 and 31 March 1898. The first day saw a six race card of three steeplechases, two hurdle races, and the opening two mile Maiden National Hunt Flat Race Plate won by Summer Lightning. The Victoria History of Kent in 1908 noted the South Eastern and Chatham Railway provided free carriage for horses and their attendants to the race meetings; this led to good size fields for the races, but the lower expense for owners meant that poorer quality race horses competed. In 1907, there were five days of racing under both Jockey Club rules and steeplechasing.

It was a right-handed undulating oval of nearly 1 mile 3 furlongs with a home straight of 2½ furlongs and a straight 6 furlongs. The inner steeplechase course of 1 mile 2 furlongs, had 7 fences. It was on this course in 1975 that Lord Oaksey, the journalist and television commentator suffered serious injuries in a fall which ended his riding career. The centre of the course is farmed, and has a reservoir fed by a pumping station on the west side of the oval. The East Stour river runs along the western edge of the oval and under the straight course.

In July 2012, Arena Leisure and Northern Racing, the lessees of the racecourse announced the closure of the racecourse as a temporary measure. Outdated facilities and the delay of a project to build houses on part of the site were given as the reasons for the closure. It was announced that a final decision would be made in 2013. Folkestone held its last scheduled meeting on 18 December 2012.

== Post-closure and future ==
Arena Leisure stated in 2012 that the closure was temporary. However, in 2016 it was revealed that plans drawn up by Folkestone and Hythe Council include the racecourse area for building houses in a development known as Otterpool Garden Town. By December 2017 much of the racecourse infrastructure had fallen into disrepair and there was no prospect of any resumption of racing at the venue. A planning application for 8,500 homes was submitted to the Council in February 2019, with a plan for a phased development over 30 years. Plans for the Otterpool garden town were approved in April 2023.

Between 2013 and 2016, the venue hosted the War and Peace show, previously held at the Hop Farm at Beltring, and featured in Netflix's Dark Tourism documentary series. It has since returned to its original location.

== Use by RAF ==
The racecourse was first used by aviation when a flying meeting was held in September 1910. Three aircraft were present, watched by a large crowd. Between 1940 and 1941 the racecourse was used as a decoy airfield with dummy aircraft placed to look like an active airfield. On 23 April 1944 660 Squadron, an army cooperation squadron of the Royal Air Force, arrived at what was then known as RAF Westenhanger after the nearby village. The squadron based in a tented camp was equipped with Auster Mark IV single-engined liaison aircraft and used the racecourse to practise operations with local army units. On 12 July 1944 the squadron of 12 Austers escorted by a Supermarine Walrus rescue flying boat left Westenhanger for France. The airfield was then restored back to use as a racecourse. Rubble from wartime buildings can be seen on the north side of the straight course where it meets the oval.

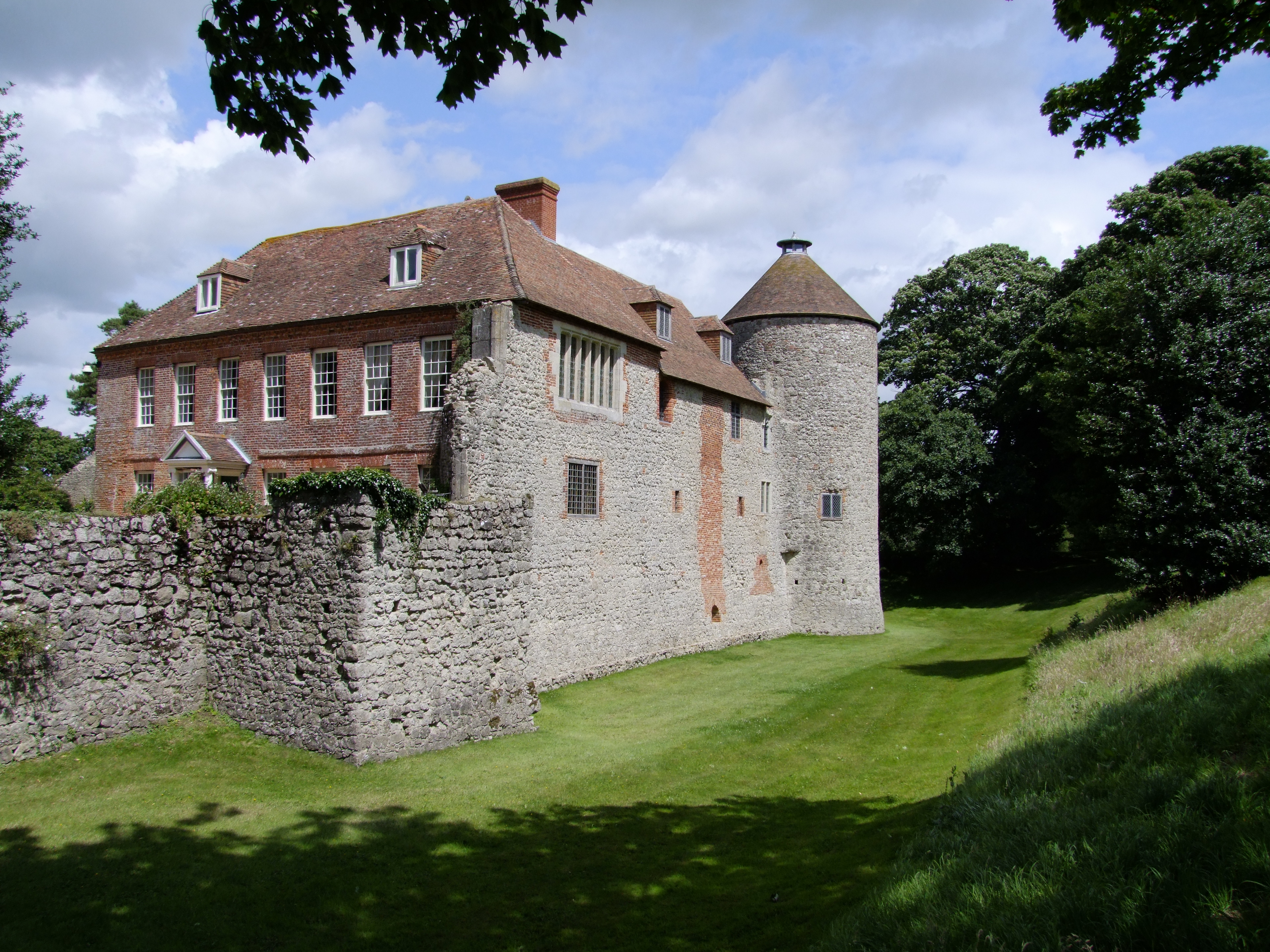
Westenhanger Castle.
