= Frederik Tylicki =

Former flat racing jockey

Personal information
- Born: c. 1986 Cologne, Germany
- Occupation: Jockey

Horse racing career
- Sport: Horse racing

Major racing wins
- John Smith's Cup (2008) Prix Jean Romanet (2016) Prix de l'Opéra (2016)

Racing awards
- Lester Award for Apprentice Jockey of the Year (2009)

Honours
- British flat racing Champion Apprentice (2009)

Frederik 'Freddy' Tylicki (born c.1986) is a German-born former flat racing jockey in Great Britain. He was British flat racing Champion Apprentice in 2009, when he also won the Lester Award for Apprentice Jockey of the Year. His Polish-born father Andrzej Tylicki was three times champion jockey in Germany.

== Career ==
Tylicki began learning the racing trade in Ireland under trainers Dermot Weld and Jim Bolger. He was then apprenticed to Richard Fahey in Malton, North Yorkshire. His first big race victory came in 2008, when he won the John Smith's Cup at York on Flying Clarets. He finished that year with 25 wins from 163 rides. In the 2009 season, he built on this initial success to narrowly beat David Probert to the title of British flat racing Champion Apprentice. Probert was suspended for the final day of the flat racing season when just a single victory separated them. Tylicki donated his trophy to the family of fellow apprentice Jamie Kyne, who had recently died in a house fire. At the end of the season, he wintered in California to enhance his skills, riding for trainer Paddy Gallagher.

Less than a year after becoming champion apprentice, his career was put on hold after a serious shoulder injury. He finished the year with just 26 winners.

After coming back from injury he had over 60 winners a season. In September 2012 he rode five winners for five different trainers at Newcastle on a Saturday, followed by a double on two outsiders at Yarmouth on the following Thursday. Semayyel, trained by Clive Brittain won the John Musker Fillies' Stakes at a starting price of 125–1, one of the biggest priced winners in British horse racing history, and Tylicki followed up with a win on a 33-1 horse. For the former achievement he won the Flat Jockey Award at the annual 'Magic Moments' awards dinner.

On 31 October 2016 he was involved in a serious four horse accident at Kempton Park which ended with him in intensive care at St George's Hospital in Tooting. He was later diagnosed with T7 paralysis meaning he is paralysed from the waist down.

Initially based in the north of England, Tylicki moved to Newmarket, Suffolk.

== Major wins ==
France

- Prix de l'Opéra – Speedy Boarding (2016)
- Prix Jean Romanet – Speedy Boarding (2016)

== British career wins ==
Season	Wins	Runs
2008	25	163
2009	71	495
2010	26	202
2011	67	592
2012	67	471
2013	62	538
2014	77	530
2015	82	493
2016	45	419
