= Northern Racing =

- Company type: Private
- Industry: Leisure, Horse racing
- Predecessor: Chepstow Racecourse plc
- Founded: 1998
- Founder: Sir Stanley Clarke CBE
- Headquarters: Burton upon Trent, Staffordshire, United Kingdom
- Number of locations: Bath, Brighton, Chepstow, Ffos Las, Fontwell Park, Hereford, Newcastle, Sedgefield, Uttoxeter, Yarmouth
- Key people: Michael Howard, Baron Howard of Lympne (Chairman); Tony Kelly (Managing Director)
- Owner: David and Simon Reuben via Reuben Brothers
- Parent: Aldersgate Ltd, Bahamas
- Website: NorthernRacing.co.uk

Northern Racing was a private company that owned ten horse racing courses and one golf course in the United Kingdom. It was formed in 1998 by Sir Stanley Clarke CBE, and after being listed on the Alternative Investment Market, was owned privately by the Reuben Brothers. In 2012, it was merged with Arena Leisure to form Arena Racing Company

== Background ==
Sir Stanley Clarke, a self-made property developer millionaire, had always had an interest in horses. After briefly working as a trainer, he and his wife owned and developed various horses, including:

- Rolling Ball: trained by Martin Pipe, won the 1991 Sun Alliance Chase at Cheltenham Racecourse.
- Lord Relic: won the 1993 Challow Novices' Hurdle at Newbury Racecourse by 10 lengths.
- Lord Gyllene: trained by Steve Brookshaw and ridden by Tony Dobbin, won the 1997 Grand National at Aintree Racecourse. The victory of Lord Gyllene is remembered as much for the circumstances surrounding the bomb threats and re-staging of the Grand National on the following Monday, as for his win itself.
- Barton: trained by Tim Easterby won 14 out of his 20 races. Barton won the 1999 Royal & Sun Alliance Novices' Hurdle at the Cheltenham Festival, and is one of a few horses to defeat the triple Cheltenham Gold Cup winner Best Mate.

An active director of the Racecourse Association and a director of the British Bloodstock Agency, in 1991 Clarke was elected a member of the Jockey Club.

== History ==
In 1988 Clarke acquired the lease on Uttoxeter Racecourse from East Staffordshire district council. He invested in new grandstands, improving facilities for racegoers, jockeys, trainers and horses, and greatly increased prize money. He engaged customers, and requested feedback, including pinning up "How are we doing?" posters in the toilets.

The development of Uttoxeter formed the business model for Clarke's later seven purchases, each with a distinctive green and white livery as part of a re-branding that concentrated hugely on their having a "spotless" appearance. The group eventually included: Brighton; Fontwell Park; Yarmouth; Bath; Hereford; Sedgefield. After buying Newcastle Racecourse, Clarke appeared on the first race day in the Silver Ring, mounted a soap box and addressed the crowd. Telling them that having inspected the facilities he was less than impressed, and promised to put things right with investment. The punters responded with an enthusiastic ovation.

Naming the umbrella holding company Northern Racing, it was one of the first racecourse groups to negotiate directly with the bookmaking industry to secure a deal for transmitting pictures from their racecourses directly to Britain's betting shops, and later internationally.

In 2000, he took an 80% controlling stake in the Alternative Investment Market-listed Chepstow Racecourse plc. Installing himself as Executive chairman, one of his daughters as a director and his son as CEO, he reversed his existing seven other racecourses into the listed entity, renaming it Northern Racing plc.

Clarke was diagnosed with bowel cancer in 2000. After a series of operations which removed three quarters of his liver, he underwent chemotherapy, and was pronounced in remission. After the cancer returned in 2004, he resigned his positions with St. Modwen Properties and Northern Racing, before dying at his home in Barton-under-Needwood on 19 September 2004.

== Operations ==
In December 2006, the Reuben Brothers made an offer of 200p per share for Northern Racing, completing the bid and taking it private again in April 2007.

The company retained its headquarters in Burton upon Trent, and added both Ffos Las Racecourse and Parklands Golf Course, Newcastle, to its portfolio.

In April 2012, Reuben Brothers bought Arena Leisure, and merged the two to create Arena Racing Company.

== Courses ==
- Bath
- Brighton
- Chepstow
- Ffos Las
- Fontwell Park
- Hereford
- Newcastle
- Sedgefield
- Uttoxeter
- Yarmouth
