= Arena Leisure =

British horse racing company, 1997–2012

Arena Leisure plc
- Company type: Public
- Founded: 1997; 29 years ago
- Fate: Merged with Northern Racing
- Successor: Northern Racing

Arena Leisure plc was a Public Company based in London, England, which existed as an independent entity until 2012 when it was merged with Northern Racing to form the Arena Racing Company. The company operated seven of the UK's horse racing courses - at the time, a 23% share of the UK horse racing market - as well as other leisure industry interests.

== Overview ==
Founded in 1997, the company acted as an acquisitions vehicle to buy a number of UK racecourses and leisure interests, also spanning golf courses and hotels, and joint ventures with a 47.85% stake in TV channel At The Races. The hotels were all leased to major hotel chains.

Arena became dominant in the UK horse racing industry by adapting three of its tracks - Lingfield Park, Southwell and Wolverhampton - to artificial surfaces, giving it 3 of the 4 of the UK's all weather tracks. These could be utilised throughout the year and in different weather conditions, increasing usage and hence revenue.

Having built up a 29.9% stake in the company, the second largest behind race horse owner Trevor Hemmings with 40%, after approval from the Office of Fair Trading that there was no need to refer the proposed bid to the Competition Commission, in April 2012 Reuben Brothers bought Arena Leisure. The company was then merged with the brothers' existing holding in Northern Racing to create the Arena Racing Company, otherwise known as ARC.

== Race Courses ==
The following racecourses were owned/leased by Arena Leisure

- Doncaster - Main event being the St. Leger festival in September
- Folkestone Racecourse - Kent's only racecourse
- Lingfield Park
- Windsor
- Southwell - Features an all weather track
- Wolverhampton - UK's busiest racecourse and also the UK's first floodlit course
- Worcester - Leased from Worcester City Council
