= John Musker Fillies' Stakes =

Flat horse race in Britain

- Class: Listed
- Location: Great Yarmouth Racecourse; Great Yarmouth, England, United Kingdom
- Race type: Flat / Thoroughbred
- Sponsor: EBF Stallions
- Website: Great Yarmouth

Race information
- Distance: 1m 2f 23y (2,030 metres)
- Surface: Turf
- Track: Left-handed
- Qualification: Three-years-old and up fillies & mares exc. Group 1 and Group 2 winners after 31 March.
- Weight: 8 st 13 lb (3yo); 9 st 4 lb (4yo+); Penalties; 3 lb for Listed winners* 5 lb for Group 3 winners* * after 31 March
- Purse: £55,000 (2025); 1st: £30,921

John Musker Fillies Stakes
2026
Naga	Fairy Glen	Morrophore

Previous years
2025
Running Lion	Anna Swan	Rainbows Edge
2024
Sound Angela	Naomi Lapaglia	High Spirited
2023
Sapphire Seas	Mukaddamah	Infinite Cosmos
2022
Shaara	Mise En Scene	Ville De Grace
2021
Ville De Grace	Freyja	Sweet Believer

2020-2011
2020
Majestic Noor	Black Lotus	Festive Star
2019
Fanny Logan	Bighearted	Brassica
2018
Sheikha Reika	Rasima	Scottish Jig
2017
Beautiful Morning	Vintage Folly	High Hopes
2016
So Mi Dar	Nezwaah	Arabian Queen
2015
Talmada	Speedy Boarding	Elbereth
2014
Hadaatha	Albasharah	Wall Of Sound
2013
Miss You Too	Jabhaat	Ribbons
2012
Semayyel	Aniseed	Miss Starlight
2011
Principal Role	Modeyra	Captivator

2010-2001
2010
Nouriya	Clarietta	Silver Grey
2009
Nashmiah	Mooakada	Splashdown
2008
Cape Amber	Moon Sister	Classic Legend
2007
Samira Gold	Shorthand	Reunite
2006
Dance Partner	Gower Song	Grain of Truth
2005
Asawer	Coqueteria	Shared Dreams
2004
Polar Jem	Shamara	La Persiana
2003
Echoes In Eternity	Silence Is Golden	Beneventa
2002
Miss Corniche	Persian Lass	Rosa Parks

2000-1993
2000
Courting	Sacred Song	Moselle
1999
Gino's Spirits	Kittiwake	Risque Lady
1998
Saafeya	Innuendo	La Nuit Rose
1997
Entice	Meshhed	Bombazine
1996
Flame Valley	Balalaika	Berenice
1995
Poppy Carew	Jumilla	Goalwah
1994
La Confederation	Monaassabaat	Meadow Pipit
1993
Forthwith	Seek The Pearl	Rose Alto

The John Musker Fillies' Stakes is a Listed flat horse race in Great Britain open to fillies and mares aged three years or older. It is run at Great Yarmouth, over a distance of 1 mile, 2 furlongs and 23 yards (2,033 metres) and it is scheduled to take place each year in September. It was first run in 1993. The race is named after John Musker (died 1926), a racehorse breeder from Norfolk.

== Records ==
Leading jockey (2 wins):

- Frankie Dettori - Echoes In Eternity (2003), So Mi Dar (2016)
- Darryll Holland – Entice (1997), Miss Corniche (2002)
- Ryan Moore - Nouriya (2010), Ville De Grace (2021)
- Philip Robinson - Gino's Spirits (1999), Dance Partner (2006)
- Seb Sanders - Courting (2000), Samira Gold (2007)
- William Buick - Talmada (2015), Sapphire Seas (2023)
- Robert Havlin - Fanny Logan (2019), Naga (2026)

Leading trainer (8 wins):

- John Gosden – Saafeya (1998), Dance Partner (2006), So Mi Dar (2016), Fanny Logan (2019), Majestic Noor (2020), Shaara (2022), Running Lion (2025), Naga (2026)

== Winners ==
Year	Winner	Age	Jockey	Trainer	Time
1993	Forthwith	3	Michael Hills	John Hills	2:14.00
1994	La Confederation	3	Kevin Darley	David Loder	2:05.40
1995	Poppy Carew	3	Jimmy Quinn	Peter Harris	2:07.90
1996	Flame Valley	3	Kieren Fallon	Michael Stoute	2:04.80
1997	Entice	3	Darryll Holland	Saeed bin Suroor	2:06.10
1998	Saafeya	4	Gary Hind	John Gosden	2:05.90
1999	Gino's Spirits	3	Philip Robinson	Clive Brittain	2:07.80
2000	Courting	3	Seb Sanders	William Haggas	2:04.40
2002	Miss Corniche	3	Darryll Holland	Geoff Wragg	2:06.40
2003	Echoes In Eternity	3	Frankie Dettori	Saeed bin Suroor	2:05.89
2004	Polar Jem	4	Adrian McCarthy	George Margarson	2:07.26
2005	Asawer	3	Richard Hills	Sir Michael Stoute	2:07.00
2006	Dance Partner	4	Philip Robinson	John Gosden	2:06.22
2007	Samira Gold	3	Seb Sanders	Luca Cumani	2:07.31
2008	Cape Amber	3	Alan Munro	Peter Chapple-Hyam	2:04.04
2009	Nashmiah	3	Neil Callan	Clive Brittain	2:05.20
2010	Nouriya	3	Ryan Moore	Sir Michael Stoute	2:15.49
2011	Principal Role	4	Tom Queally	Sir Henry Cecil	2:04.65
2012	Semayyel	3	Frederik Tylicki	Clive Brittain	2:07.86
2013	Miss You Too	3	Chris Catlin	David Simcock	2:05.98
2014	Hadaatha	3	Paul Hanagan	Roger Varian	2:07.48
2015	Talmada	4	William Buick	Roger Varian	2:05.50
2016	So Mi Dar	3	Frankie Dettori	John Gosden	2:06.07
2017	Beautiful Morning	4	Colm O'Donoghue	Jessica Harrington	2:09.09
2018	Sheikha Reika	3	Andrea Atzeni	Roger Varian	2:04.42
2019	Fanny Logan	3	Robert Havlin	John Gosden	2:04.17
2020	Majestic Noor	3	Hollie Doyle	John Gosden	2:04.31
2021	Ville De Grace	3	Ryan Moore	Sir Michael Stoute	2:05.60
2022	Shaara	3	Jim Crowley	John & Thady Gosden	2:05.47
2023	Sapphire Seas	3	William Buick	Charlie Appleby	2:06.95
2024	Sound Angela	5	Silvestre De Sousa	Roger Varian	2:02.76
2025	Running Lion	5	Oisin Murphy	John & Thady Gosden	2:08.87
2026	Naga	4	Robert Havlin	John & Thady Gosden	2:04.84

== See also ==
- Horse racing in Great Britain
- List of British flat horse races
