= Racecourse Ground, Hereford =

Cricket ground in Hereford, England

Racecourse Ground
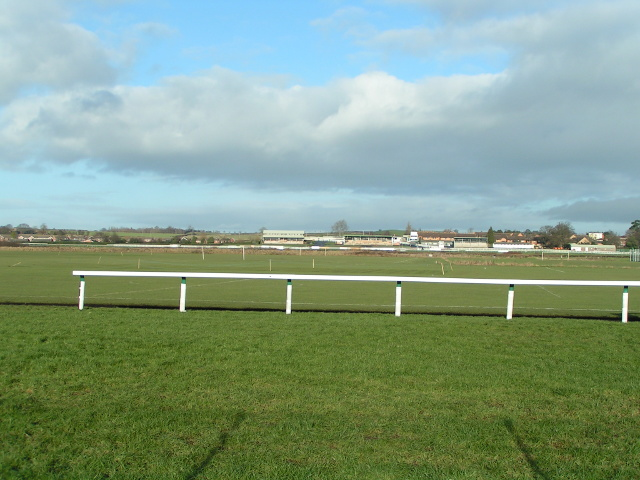

Ground information
- Location: Hereford, Herefordshire
- Coordinates: 52.0683°N 2.7286°W
- Establishment: 1909; 116 years ago
- End names
- Pavilion End; Racecourse End

Team information
Worcestershire	(1919–1988)
Herefordshire	(1992–1996)
- As of 28 July 2013; Source: Ground profile

The Racecourse Ground is a cricket ground in Hereford. The ground is located inside Hereford Racecourse and is the only remaining former first-class cricket venue in England which lies inside a racecourse. It played host to first-class and List A cricket matches for Worcestershire County Cricket Club between 1919 and 1988, and minor counties matches for Herefordshire County Cricket Club from 1992 to 1996.

== History ==
The cricket ground lies within Hereford Racecourse and was established in 1909. It first held a first-class match ten years later when Worcestershire played HK Foster's XI in 1919, played as part of the county's first-class programme after they decided not to enter the County Championship immediately after the First World War. Worcestershire's Humphrey Gilbert claimed 12 wickets in the match for 122 runs. The ground staged a further first-class match in 1919, when the Australian Imperial Forces cricket team visited to play HK Foster's XI, with the Australians Johnny Taylor scoring 138 runs in the Australian Imperial Forces first innings of 405 all out. Worcestershire returned to ground following the Second World War, playing a first-class match against the Combined Services in 1947; Worcestershire's Roly Jenkins and Dick Howorth each taking a five wicket haul in the Combined Services first innings. It would be 34 years before Worcestershire returned to using the Racecourse Ground as an outground, with it hosting one County Championship match each in 1981, 1982 and 1983. Worcestershire played four List A one-day matches at the ground between 1983 and 1987 in the John Player Special League and Refuge Assurance League. The ground was selected as one of the host venues for the 1986 ICC Trophy, a World Cup qualifying competition for associate members of the International Cricket Council. It hosted one game between Argentina and Bangladesh. Following Durham's elevation to first-class status in 1991, Herefordshire replaced them in the Minor Counties Championship for 1992. Between 1992 and 1996, Herefordshire played six Minor Counties Championship matches at the ground, in addition to one match in the 1993 MCCA Knockout Trophy.

County matches typically attracted around 4,000 people, with a Refuge Assurance League match between Worcestershire and Surrey which featured Ian Botham and Tim Curtis seeing 7,500 attend. The pavilion, which was built in 1889, is located some way from the playing surface, which is accessed across the track itself. As such, players watch matches from a tent, which adjoined the scorers' and press tent in the south-west of the ground. On major matchdays the north-west of the ground was given to match sponsors and accommodated tents and a double-decker bus. There are two scoreboards at the ground; a permanent one adjoining the main pavilion and a temporary scoreboard closer to the playing area. Following the closure of Derby Racecourse in 1939, the Racecourse Ground became the only first-class ground in England to enclosed by a racecourse.

== Records ==
=== First-class ===
- Highest team total: 405 all out by Australian Imperial Forces v HK Foster's XI, 1919
- Lowest team total: 84 all out by Worcestershire v Combined Services, 1947
- Highest individual innings: 138 not out by Johnny Taylor for Australian Imperial Forces v HK Foster's XI, 1919
- Best bowling in an innings: 6-50 by Humphrey Gilbert for HK Foster's XI v Worcestershire, 1919
- Best bowling in a match: 12-122 by Humphrey Gilbert, as above

=== List A ===
- Highest team total: 233 for 6 by Worcestershire v Gloucestershire, 1986
- Lowest team total: 154 all out by Surrey v Worcestershire, 1987
- Highest individual innings: 108 by Jack Russell for Gloucestershire v Worcestershire, 1986
- Best bowling in an innings: 3-23 by Paul Pridgeon for Worcestershire v Gloucestershire, 1986
