= David and Simon Reuben =

Indian-born British businessmen

David Reuben; Simon Reuben
- Born: David – 1938 (age 87–88); Simon – 1941 (age 84–85); Bombay, British India (now Mumbai, India)
- Spouses: David – Debra; Simon – Joyce
- Children: David – 2, including Jamie; Simon – 1

David Reuben (born 1938) and Simon Reuben (born 1941) are British businessmen. In 2026, they were named the second-richest family in British history by the Sunday Times Rich List, with a net worth of £27.9 billion.

== Early life and background ==
The brothers were born in Bombay, British India, the sons of David Sassoon Reuben and Nancy Reuben, a Baghdadi Jewish family. Their father went to Bombay from Iraq to secure work in the textile industry. Following their parents' separation, the brothers moved to London in the 1950s with their mother, and due to the change in financial circumstances, the brothers attended state schools and lived in Islington, North London, with Simon never completing his formal education.

== Careers ==
David joined a scrap metals business while Simon started out in carpets. Simon went on to buy out England's oldest carpet company J. Holdsworth & Co from the receivers and made enough money from it to start investing in property, with early investments on Walton Street and the King's Road in Chelsea. The brothers increased their wealth during the 1970s and 1980s in metals and property trading.

=== Metals business ===
In the early 1990s, the brothers invested in the Russian metals market. When Russian aluminum smelters were incapacitated by debt, Reuben's company Trans-World entered into tolling arrangements with factories in which they paid for and delivered raw materials in return for finished aluminum, which it then sold for profit. The company's investment in Russia was US$1.5 billion (£870 million), with global sales in 1995 above US$8 billion. TransWorld was accused of involvement in illegal activities, including several murders. The brothers were involved with several members of the country's new oligarchy, including Roman Abramovich. They settled a multimillion-pound legal dispute with Oleg Deripaska with a settlement being awarded to Reuben Brothers.

In 1997, Russia's Interior Minister Anatoly Kulikov linked both the Cherney brothers and Reuben brothers to the Izmaylovskaya mafia led by Anton Malevsky in Israel. In March 1998, Boris Yeltsin replaced Kulikov as minister.

In 2008, the Reuben brothers returned to the commodity business, expanding their mining interests with a portfolio of mines in Morocco, Indonesia, and South Africa.

=== Present activities ===
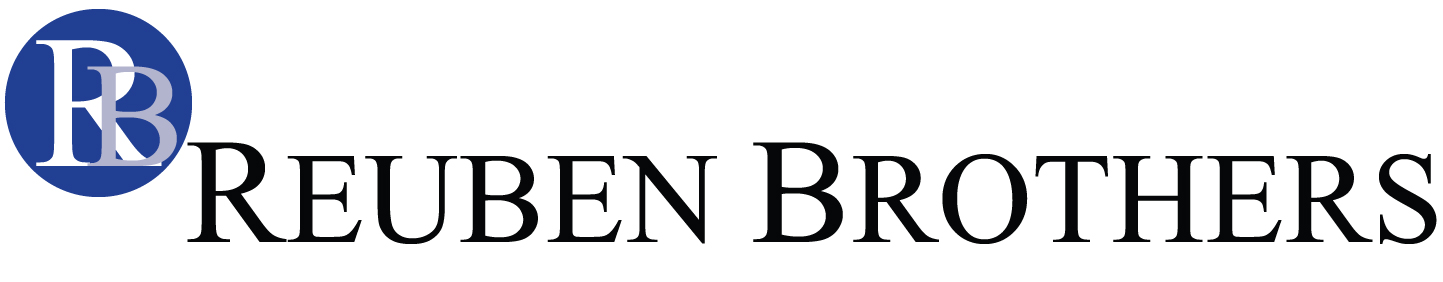
Reuben Brothers

By 2000, the brothers sold all their Russian assets as they focused their business activities mainly in the UK property market. They have been involved in financing a number of acquisitions and have investments in technology companies. As of 2016, their business activities mainly involved real estate, both in the UK and abroad, venture capital, and private equity. Simon Reuben is an investor in OneDome, a fintech business based in the UK.

==== Real estate ====
UK properties owned by the Reuben Brothers include: Millbank Tower; the John Lewis Partnership headquarters in Victoria; the American Express offices also in Victoria; Carlton House SW1; Academy House on Sackville Street; Connaught House on Berkeley Square; Market Towers; the London Primark store on Oxford Street; Sloane Street shops; and Cambridge House, the former premises of the Naval and Military Club, which comprises six freehold buildings which have a planning consent for a six-star hotel and private members' club.

Other investments and developments include Merchant Square, a 1,800,000 sq ft (170,000 m^{2}) development scheme of offices and flats, in the Paddington area of London; Park Plaza Hotels & Resorts, a 50/50 joint venture in a new apart-hotel under the 'art'otel' brand in Hoxton, City of London; Hampton House, demolition and redevelopment of the 1960s office block opposite Tate Britain that was designed by Foster & Partners and features a mix of apartments and an apart-hotel on the River Thames next to the Park Plaza London Riverbank hotel; airports at London Oxford and London Heliport. In 2006, the Reuben Brothers formed a partnership that injected private equity into the FTSE-listed McCarthy & Stone, a retirement home construction company, exiting from that investment in 2013.

==== Aldersgate Investments ====
The Reuben Brothers invested in luxury leisure group Belmond Ltd in 2007, and sold their share in 2019 for £233 million. Other holdings include Travelodge Hotels; D2 Jeans and Blue Inc clothing retailers, with retailer Sir Stuart Rose; Luup and Metro Bank; The Wellington Pub Company, the largest free-of-tie pub estate in the UK with approximately 850 tenanted pubs; Global Switch, the carrier data centre provider in Europe and the Asia-Pacific region; and a joint venture with British Marine, that in 2014 had eight vessels with plans to double the fleet size.

==== Sport ====
===== Takeover of Newcastle United =====
On 14 April 2020, it emerged that a deal to transfer ownership of Newcastle United had been agreed between incumbent owner Mike Ashley and a prospective buying consortium consisting of Reuben Brothers, Amanda Staveley's PCP Capital Partners and the Public Investment Fund of Saudi Arabia. The Premier League initially refused to ratify the deal, and Mike Ashley engaged in legal proceedings against the Premier League to complete the takeover. On 7 October 2021, the Premier League approved the buy-out, stating that it has "received legally binding guarantees that the Kingdom of Saudi Arabia will not control the Newcastle United club". The buy-out deal involved the Saudi Public Investment Fund taking up 80% of Newcastle United shares, while the Reuben Brothers and PCP Capital Partners each took 10% of the remaining shares.

===== Arena Racing Company =====
Arena Racing Company, also called ARC Racing and Leisure Group is a UK private company, created in 2012 by the merger of Arena Leisure and Northern Racing. It owns and operates 16 racecourses in Great Britain, accounting for 39% of British racing fixtures. It operates hotels at Doncaster Racecourse, Wolverhampton Racecourse and Lingfield Park Racecourse, and golf courses at Lingfield, Southwell and Newcastle.

==== Entertainment ====
On 19 August 2024, Reuben Brothers acquired a strategic stake in EDGLRD, an entertainment company founded by filmmaker Harmony Korine.

== Controversial statement by London mayor ==
In 2006, Ken Livingstone, the Mayor of London at the time, used a press conference to accuse Simon and David Reuben of jeopardising the £4 billion Olympic City development, in which the Reuben brothers held a 50% stake. Livingstone controversially told the media conference, referring to the Reuben brothers: "If they're not happy here, they can go back to Iran and try their luck with the ayatollahs, if they don't like the planning regime or my approach". Conservative members of the London Assembly stated the brothers were not Iranian, but had been born in British India of Iraqi-Jewish parents. After a public complaint, and a subsequent official investigation into Livingstone's comments, the investigating officer dismissed the complaint and concluded that Livingstone had reason to be strongly critical of the Reuben brothers' conduct, and that his criticism, while "robust", was "reasonable" in the circumstances.

== The Reuben Foundation ==
The family's philanthropic vehicle, the Reuben Foundation, is focused on the advancement of healthcare and education.

The family founded the Nancy Reuben Primary School, an independent Jewish day school in Hendon in honour of their mother.

The foundation has donated £80 million to support the creation of Reuben College, Oxford, originally named Parks College. It is a post-graduate college focused on climate change, artificial intelligence and cellular life.

== Personal life ==
According to the Sunday Times Rich List 2023, David and Simon Reuben and their combined family had an estimated net worth of £24.4 billion. This made them Britain's fourth wealthiest family.

The Times has reported that the brothers' businesses make extensive use of offshore tax havens. A spokesperson said that their businesses "fully comply with UK tax laws".

The brothers are donors to the Conservative Party.

=== Wealth rankings ===
Year	Sunday Times Rich List		Forbes The World's Billionaires	
Year	Rank	Net worth (£) bn	Rank	Net worth (US$) bn
2006	8	£3.25 ▲	185 ▼	$3.60 ▼
2007	8	£3.49 ▲	177	$4.50 ▲
2008	10 ▼	£4.30 ▲	178 ▼	$5.50 ▲
2009	9 ▲	£2.50 ▼	98 ▲	$5.00 ▼
2010	5 ▲	£5.53 ▲	93 ▲	$7.50 ▲
2011	8 ▼	£6.18 ▲	114 ▼	$8.00 ▲
2012	8	£7.08 ▲	100 ▲	$9.00 ▲
2013	7 ▲	£8.28 ▲	103 ▼	$10.50 ▲
2014	7	£9.00 ▲	95 ▲	$11.50 ▲
2015	5 ▼	£9.70 ▲	80 ▲	$13.70 ▲
2016	1 ▲	£13.10 ▲	60 ▲	$14.40 ▲
2017	3 ▼	£14 ▲	65 ▼	$15.3 ▲

Legend
Icon	Description
Steady	Has not changed from the previous year's list
▲	Has increased from the previous year's list
▼	Has decreased from the previous year's list
