= Reuben Foundation =

Private charitable foundation in England

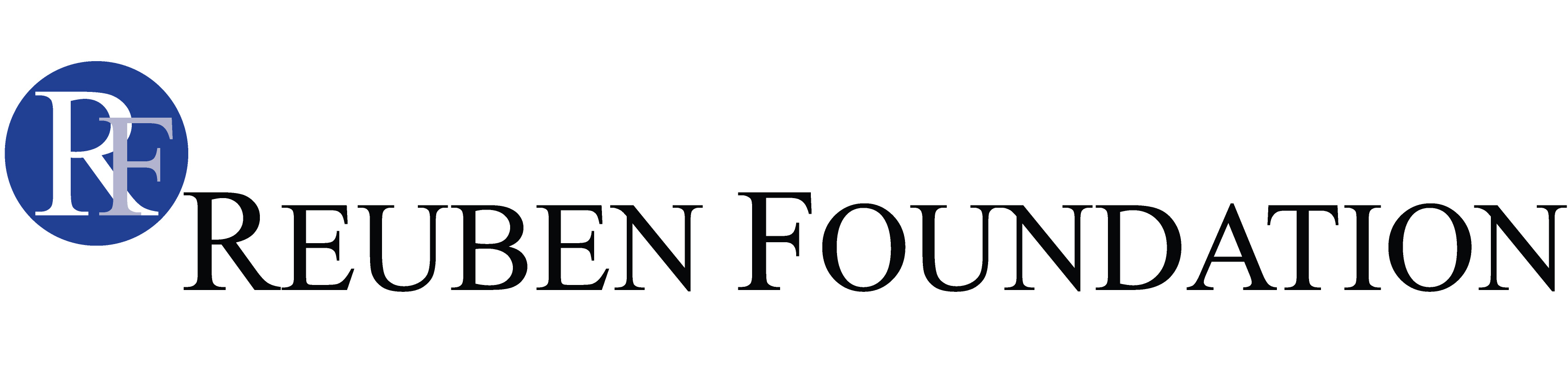
- Formation: 2002; 24 years ago
- Founder: David and Simon Reuben
- Registration no.: 1094130
- Legal status: Registered
- Purpose: Charitable
- Headquarters: Millbank Tower, 21-24 Millbank, London SW1P 4PQ
- Location: London, England
- Region served: England; Wales; Israel; the United States; Canada; Greece
- Fields: Global healthcare and education
- Owner: Reuben Family
- Trustee: Lisa Reuben
- Revenue: £4.6 million (2015)
- Disbursements: £2 million (in 2015)
- Endowment: US$100 million (in 2002)
- Website: www.reubenfoundation.com

The Reuben Foundation is a private foundation established to channel the charitable giving of the Reuben family and David and Simon Reuben. It has a focus on healthcare and education. Formed in 2002 as the Reuben Brothers Foundation with an initial endowment of US$100 million, grants are made by invitation only and on the approval of the Trustees.

The Reuben Foundation is registered with the Charity Commission for England and Wales and operates in the United Kingdom, Canada, Israel, the United States and Greece.

== Education ==
=== The Reuben Scholarship Programme ===
In 2012 the Reuben Foundation launched the Reuben Scholarship Programme with a multimillion-pound endowment. The programme was formed to provide financial support to students from disadvantaged backgrounds. The Reuben Scholarship Programme is in partnership with the University of Oxford, University of Cambridge, UCL and Ark Schools.

=== Other ===
In 2013 the Reuben Foundation funded the establishment of The Reuben Business Faculty at Oxford Spires Academy.

== Health ==
=== Great Ormond Street Hospital, London ===
The Reuben Foundation founded a Centre for Paediatric Virology at Great Ormond Street Hospital in London. The centre works study viral infections, identify areas of critical patient need, and adopt the results of current virus research into clinical practice.

=== The Royal Marsden Hospital, London ===
The Reuben Foundation Imaging Centre was officially opened in May 2015 by Simon Stevens, Chief Executive of NHS England.

=== Other ===
The Reuben Foundation provided funding for Jack Berry House in North Yorkshire, the IJF's second respite and rehabilitation centre for injured jockeys.

== Community ==
=== Lyric Theatre, Hammersmith ===
The Reuben Foundation has provided the principal funding to construct The Reuben Foundation Wing at the Lyric Theatre in Hammersmith.

=== BFI Reuben Library ===
The British Film Institute hosts the BFI Reuben Library within BFI Southbank.

=== Other ===
In November 2016 the Reuben Foundation were the Headline Sponsor of the Centrepoint at the Palace Gala. Centrepoint provides temporary shelter, health and education for homeless young people. Debra Reuben, wife of David Reuben, is a Founder of the Centrepoint Circle Club.

The Reuben Foundation provided a contribution towards the Imperial War Museum's major exhibition, Truth and Memory.

In 2012 the Clinton Foundation held its first event in London, in collaboration with The Reuben Foundation.

In 2011 the Reuben Foundation, in partnership with the Mayor of London Boris Johnson and under the strategic help of Michael Bloomberg, launched Team London, which gave voluntary sector grants. Within 12 months circa 19,000 volunteers from Team London had donated 250,000 hours of free time to help boost literacy, skills and green projects in the capital.
