= Robert Mottram Memorial Trophy =

Steeplechase horse race in Britain

Robert Mottram Memorial Trophy
2026
Captain Teague	Tutti Quanti	George's Lad

Previous years
2025
Speculatrix	Doyen Quest	Brucio
2024
Springwell Bay	Insurrection	Boombawn
2023
Unexpected Party	Knappers Hill	Bella Bliss
2022
Sebastopol	Victorias Peak	Only two ran
2021
Tea Clipper	Fidelio Vallis	Presentandcounting

2020-2011
2020
Grand Sancy	Paint The Dream	Longhouse Sale
2019
Jarveys Plate	Reserve Tank	Posh Trish
2018
Spiritofthegames	Monbeg Legend	Only two finished
2017
Finian's Oscar	Tintern Theatre	Aintree My Dream
2016
Rock The Kasbah	Our Kaempfer	Theinval
2015
Cocktails At Dawn	As De Mee	Native River
2014
Southfield Theatre	Monkey Kingdom	Broadway Buffalo
2013
Balder Succes	The Romford Pele	Double Ross
2012
Fingal Bay	Tiger O'Toole	Witness That
2011
Cue Card	Micheal Flips	Silviniaco Conti

The Robert Mottram Memorial Trophy, currently sponsored by Tom Malone Bloodstock, is a Listed National Hunt chase in Great Britain which is open to horses aged four years or older. The race is for novice chasers, is run at Chepstow over a distance of about 2 miles and 3½ furlongs (2 miles 3 furlongs and 98 yards, or 3,914 metres), and is scheduled to take place each year in October.

The race was first run in 2011 and was awarded Listed status in 2017.

== Winners ==
Year	Winner	Age	Jockey	Trainer
2011	Cue Card	5	Joe Tizzard	Colin Tizzard
2012	Fingal Bay	6	Richard Johnson	Philip Hobbs
2013	Balder Succes	5	Robert Thornton	Alan King
2014	Southfield Theatre	6	Sam Twiston-Davies	Paul Nicholls
2015	Cocktails At Dawn	7	Nico de Boinville	Nicky Henderson
2016	Rock The Kasbah	6	Richard Johnson	Philip Hobbs
2017	Finian's Oscar	5	Bryan Cooper	Colin Tizzard
2018	Spiritofthegames	6	Harry Skelton	Dan Skelton
2019	Jarveys Plate	6	Paddy Brennan	Fergal O'Brien
2020	Grand Sancy	6	Harry Cobden	Paul Nicholls
2021	Tea Clipper	6	Stan Sheppard	Tom Lacey
2022	Sebastopol	8	Stan Sheppard	Tom Lacey
2023	Unexpected Party	8	Harry Skelton	Dan Skelton
2024	Springwell Bay	7	Jonjo O'Neill Jr	Jonjo & AJ O'Neill
2025	Speculatrix	6	Sean Bowen	Gordon Elliott
2026	Captain Teague	8	Harry Skelton	Dan Skelton

== See also ==
- Horse racing in Great Britain
- List of British National Hunt races
