= Wolverhampton Racecourse =

Horse racing venue in Wolverhampton, England

Coordinates: 52.6040°N 2.1451°W

Wolverhampton

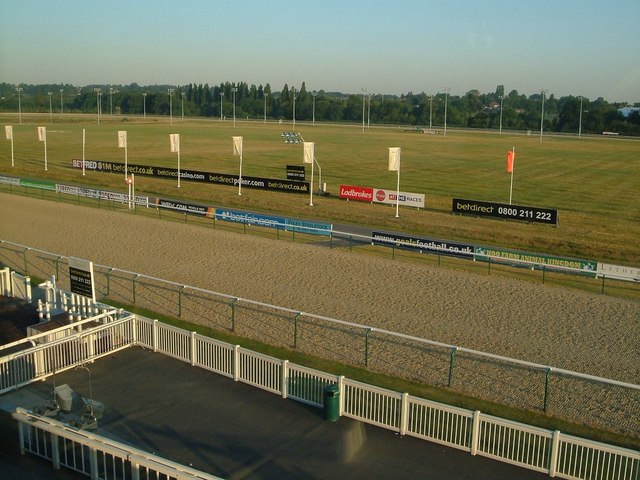
- The course from the stands
- Interactive map of Wolverhampton
- Location: Wolverhampton, West Midlands
- Owned by: Arena Racing Company
- Screened on: Sky Sports Racing
- Course type: Flat
- Notable races: Lady Wulfruna Stakes

Wolverhampton Racecourse is a thoroughbred horse racing venue located in Wolverhampton, West Midlands, England. The track was the first to be floodlit in Britain and often holds meetings in the evening. The track surface has been Tapeta since 2014.

== History ==
There has been a racecourse in Wolverhampton since 1825, in what is now the West Park, where the Park Road follows the line of the track. This was sold to the Corporation in 1878 and, after a gap of nine years, a new course was formed at Dunstall Park.

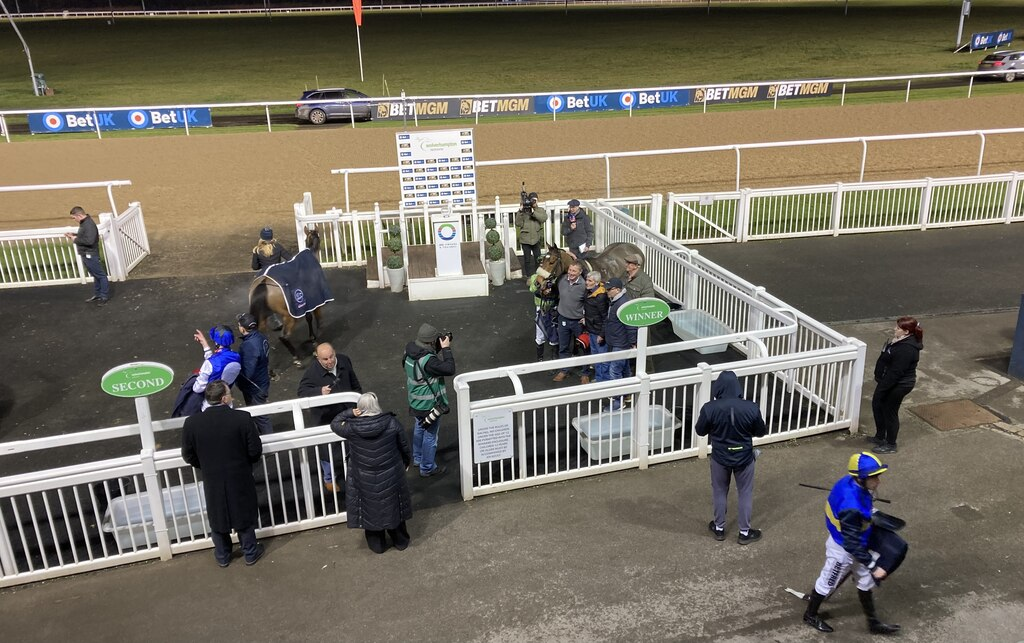
The winners' enclosure

In 1993, the final National Hunt meeting took place at Wolverhampton. In December of the same year, the course was re-vamped with floodlights and a new all-weather Fibresand track that ran alongside the turf track. A hotel, new grandstand, restaurant and executive boxes were also built at this time. The Queen re-opened the racecourse in January 1994. In 1999, the course was bought from private ownership by Arena Leisure. In 2004 the Fibresand and turf tracks were replaced with a single Polytrack surface, as well as refurbishment of the hotel and conference facilities. Since that time the course has only held flat all weather races.

Following the merger of Arena Leisure and Northern Racing, Wolverhampton became part of Arena Racing Company.

In 2014, the course was closed for redevelopment that included relaying the course with a Tapeta surface. The course reopened on 11 August 2014.

The course has been granted planning permission by Wolverhampton City Council, to expand the hotel from 54 to 170 bedrooms and to tarmac the over-spill car park. The £26 million project also includes plans for a casino which would create the first racino in the UK.

The Lady Wulfruna Stakes is the most valuable race at Wolverhampton. One of the most notable winners of the race is Sovereign Debt who won the Group 3, 2017 Diomed Stakes at Epsom. Three-time champion jockey, Ryan Moore, is the most successful in the saddle in the race with four wins.

== Course ==
The course is one mile (1,609 m) in circumference, with tight left-hand turns — giving it greater commonality with most racetracks found in the United States than with other venues in the UK. The straight is short at just two furlongs. The surface was Fibresand until 2004 when it became a Polytrack. As of 2014, the surface was changed to Tapeta.

== Notable races ==
- Lady Wulfruna Stakes

== Concerts ==
Wolverhampton Racecourse has hosted a number of concerts including Madness, Jess Glynne, Kaiser Chiefs, UB40 and The Human League.

== Dunstall Park Greyhound Stadium ==
A greyhound racing track has been built inside the racecourse, which opened in September 2025. The greyhound racing track follows the idea of Towcester Greyhound Stadium, in that it has been built within the boundaries of the horse racing course. On 7 March 2026 Dunstall Park staged the first dual horse racing and greyhound racing fixture in Britain, with greyhound racing taking place after the afternoon horse race meeting.
