= Lady Wulfruna Stakes =

Flat horse race in Britain

Lady Wulfruna Stakes
2026
Cool Hoof Luke	Heathcliff	Marshman

Previous years
2025
Royal Zabeel	Witch Hunter	Al Shabab Storm
2024
Nine Tenths	Misty Grey	Shouldvebeenaring
2023
Berkshire Shadow	Angel Bleu	Harry's Bar
2022
Tinker Toy	Happy Power	Misty Grey
2021
Mums Tipple	Lord Of The Lodge	Highland Dress

2020-2011
2020
Urban Icon	Documenting	Marie's Diamond
2019
Above The Rest	Island Of Life	Cardsharp
2018
Second Thought	Summer Icon	Masham Star
2017
Salateen	Keystroke	Yuften
2016
Mister Universe	Sovereign Debt	Realize
2015
Sovereign Debt	Chookie Royale	Al Thakhira
2014
Chookie Royale	Hasopop	Bertiewhittle
2013
Solar Deity	Kenny Powers	Verse Of Love
2012
Libys Dream	Belgian Bill	Clockmaker
2011
Dunelight	Docofthebay	Malcheek

2010-2002
2010
Dunelight	Mia's Boy	Lovelace
2009
Ceremonial Jade	Vitznau	Aeroplane
2008
Jack Sullivan	War Artist	Lovelace
2007
Border Music	Jack Sullivan	King's Caprice
2006
Border Music	Kamanda Laugh	Kindlelight Debut
2005
Mistral Sky	Moayed	Samuel Charles
2004
Aleutian	Cardinal Venture	Rockets 'n Rollers
2003
Rafferty	Middleton Grey	Granny's Pet
2002
Air Mail	My Tess	Cd Europe

The Lady Wulfruna Stakes is a Listed flat horse race in Great Britain open to horses aged four years and over. It is run at Wolverhampton over a distance of 7 furlongs and 36 yards (1,441 metres), and it is scheduled to take place each year in March.

The race was first run in 2002 and was awarded Listed status in 2007.

The race is named after Wulfrun (Lady Wulfruna), the grand-daughter of King Ethelred I and Queen Aethelflaed.

== Records ==
Most successful horse (2 wins):

- Border Music - 2006, 2007
- Dunelight - 2010, 2011

Leading jockey (4 wins):

- Ryan Moore - Dunelight (2010), Second Thought (2018), Urban Icon (2020), Mums Tipple (2021)

Leading trainer (4 wins):

- Andrew Balding – Border Music (2006, 2007), Berkshire Shadow (2023), Cool Hoof Luke (2026)

== Winners ==
Year	Winner	Age	Jockey	Trainer	Time
2002	Air Mail	5	George Baker	Norma Macauley	1:28.80
2003	Rafferty	4	Darryll Holland	Clive Brittain	1:29.70
2004	Aleutian	4	Neil Pollard	David Loder	1:32.45
2005	Mistral Sky	6	Franny Norton	Stef Liddiard	1:29.82
2006	Border Music	5	Martin Dwyer	Andrew Balding	1:28.06
2007	Border Music	6	Richard Hughes	Andrew Balding	1:26.86
2008	Jack Sullivan	7	Jamie Spencer	Gerard Butler	1:28.18
2009	Ceremonial Jade	6	John Egan	Marco Botti	1:27.51
2010	Dunelight	7	Ryan Moore	Clive Cox	1:27.80
2011	Dunelight	8	Luke Morris	Clive Cox	1:28.32
2012	Libys Dream	4	Richard Kingscote	Tom Dascombe	1:27.26
2013	Solar Deity	4	Martin Harley	Marco Botti	1:27.64
2014	Chookie Royale	6	Tom Eaves	Keith Dalgleish	1:27.48
2015	Sovereign Debt	6	Joe Fanning	David Nicholls	1:26.21
2016	Mister Universe	4	Joe Fanning	Mark Johnston	1:25.35
2017	Salateen	5	Phillip Makin	David O'Meara	1:26.75
2018	Second Thought	4	Ryan Moore	William Haggas	1:27.57
2019	Above The Rest	8	Clifford Lee	David Barron	1:26.25
2020	Urban Icon	4	Ryan Moore	Richard Hannon Jr.	1:26.81
2021	Mums Tipple	4	Ryan Moore	Richard Hannon Jr.	1:26.77
2022	Tinker Toy	5	Jack Mitchell	Roger Varian	1:26.68
2023	Berkshire Shadow	4	Oisin Murphy	Andrew Balding	1:27.66
2024	Nine Tenths	4	William Buick	William Haggas	1:26.34
2025	Royal Zabeel	4	Alistair Rawlinson	Michael Appleby	1:26.24
2026	Cool Hoof Luke	4	Oisin Murphy	Andrew Balding	1:26.16

== See also ==
- Horse racing in Great Britain
- List of British flat horse races
