= Newcastle Racecourse =

Horse racing venue in Newcastle, England

Coordinates: 55°1′51″N 1°36′42″W

Newcastle
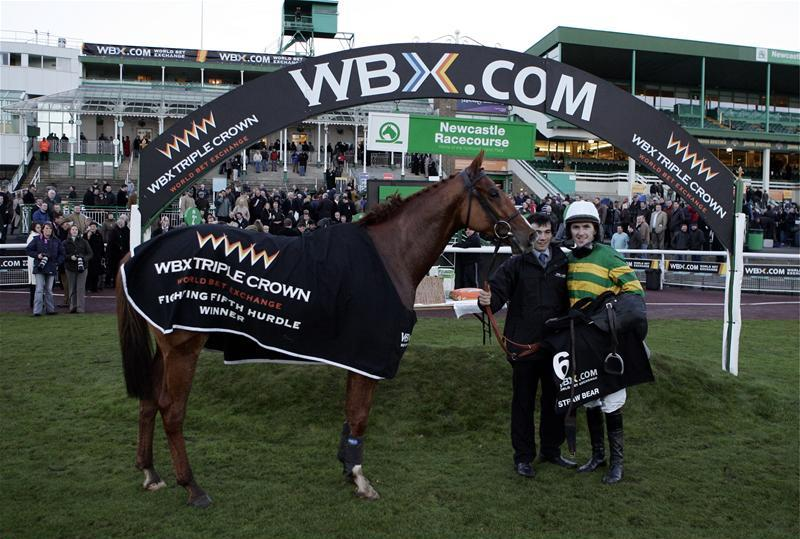
- Straw Bear in the winners' enclosure after winning the 2006 Fighting Fifth Hurdle
- Interactive map of Newcastle
- Location: Gosforth Park, Newcastle upon Tyne
- Owned by: Arena Racing Company
- Date opened: 1882
- Screened on: Sky Sports Racing
- Course type: Left-handed, Flat; National Hunt

Newcastle Racecourse is a horse racing course located at Gosforth Park in Newcastle upon Tyne, England, owned by Arena Racing Company. It stages both flat and National Hunt racing, with its biggest meeting being the Northumberland Plate held annually in June.

== History ==
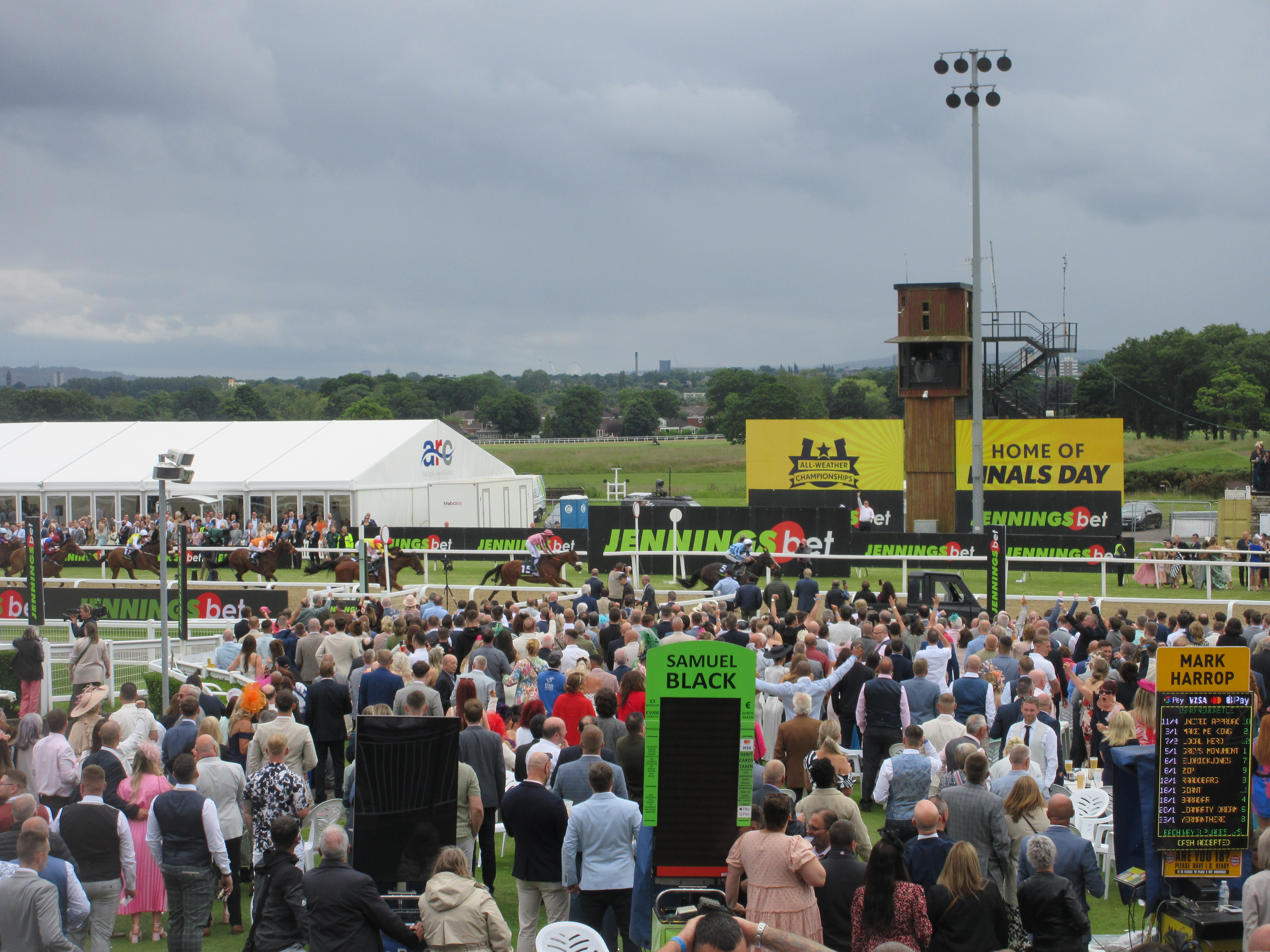
The view from the stands

Horseracing began in the North East over 350 years ago, beginning in Killingworth in the early 17th century. A King's Plate for 5 year olds, run in 3 mile heats was instigated by George II in 1753. The Town Moor hosted the first recorded Northumberland Plate in 1833 and did so until 1881 when the race transferred to High Gosforth Park. 1882 saw the first running of the Plate at Gosforth Park with a new flat and chase course, new stand and stabling for 100 horses.

In 1994 Sir Stanley Clarke's Northern Racing company acquired Newcastle Racecourse.

In April, 2002 the Scottish businessman David Williamson joined Newcastle Racecourse as managing director and during a six-year period he transformed their fortunes and helped boost turnover from £2.5m to £6.5m. The Northumberland Plate weekend now brings in £30m to the regional economy and he also introduced Ladies' Day which now attracts over 15,000 racegoers. In April, 2008 he was headhunted by Newcastle United and appointed Executive Director (Operations). Williamson was replaced by Mark Spincer.

In 2007, Newcastle's owners, Northern Racing, changed hands and came under control of the businessmen David and Simon Reuben, who then subsequently merged it with another of their companies, Arena Racing Company in 2012 forming the current company that owns the racecourse, Arena Racing Company.

In December 2013, Arena Racing Company, announced plans to change the flat turf course into an all-weather track while retaining a turf jump racing course. The new Tapeta track was completed in early 2016 with the first meeting held on 17 May of that year.

== Notable races ==
Month	DOW	Race Name	Type	Grade	Distance	Age/Sex
February	Saturday	Eider Chase	Chase	Handicap	3m 6f	5yo+
Mar/Apr	Good Friday	Burradon Stakes	Flat	Listed	1m 5y	3yo
Mar/Apr	Good Friday	All-Weather Championships Marathon	Flat	Handicap	2m 56y	4yo+
Mar/Apr	Good Friday	All-Weather 3yo Championships	Flat	Handicap	6f	3yo
Mar/Apr	Good Friday	Fillies' & Mares' Championships	Flat	Handicap	7f 14y	4yo+
Mar/Apr	Good Friday	All-Weather Sprint	Flat	Handicap	6f	4yo+
Mar/Apr	Good Friday	All-Weather Easter Classic Middle Distance Handicap	Flat	Handicap	1m 2f 42y	4yo+
Mar/Apr	Good Friday	All-Weather Championships Mile	Flat	Handicap	1m 5y	4yo+
June/July	Friday	Hoppings Stakes	Flat	Group 3	1m 2f 42y	3yo+ f
June/July	Saturday	Chipchase Stakes	Flat	Group 3	6f	3yo+
June/July	Saturday	Northumberland Plate	Flat	Handicap	2m 56y	3yo+
November	Saturday	Churchill Stakes	Flat	Listed	1m 2f 42y	3yo+
November	Saturday	Golden Rose Stakes	Flat	Listed	6f	3yo+
Nov/Dec	Saturday	Fighting Fifth Hurdle	Hurdle	Grade 1	2m	4yo+
Nov/Dec	Saturday	Rehearsal Handicap Chase	Chase	Premier Hcap	2m 7½f	4yo+

Discontinued Flat races:

- Beeswing Stakes (last run in 1999)
- Seaton Delaval Stakes (last run in 1985)
