= Hereford Racecourse =

Horse racing venue in Hereford, England

Hereford

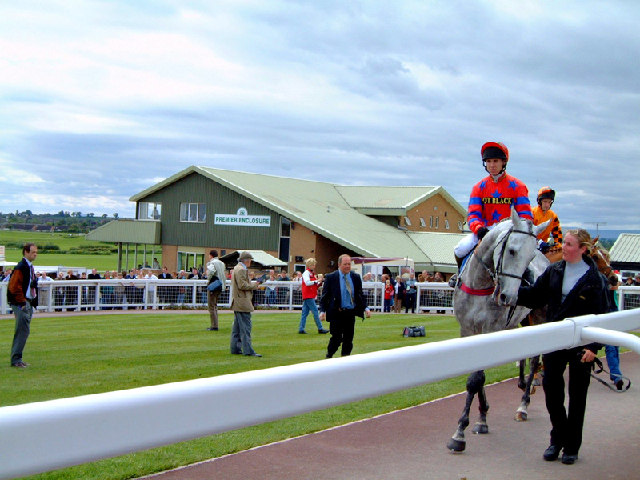
- The parade ring
- Interactive map of Hereford
- Location: Hereford, Herefordshire, England
- Coordinates: 52.073°N 2.729°W
- Owned by: Herefordshire Council
- Operated by: Arena Racing Company
- Screened on: Sky Sports Racing
- Course type: National Hunt

Hereford Racecourse is a horse racing venue located in Hereford, Herefordshire, England, owned by Herefordshire Council and operated by Arena Racing Company.

The course is almost square in shape with a circuit of about a mile-and-a-half. The first recorded race meeting was held in August 1771. The course was greatly modernised in the 1960s, with also in 1966 a photo-finish camera being installed.

Having failed to obtain a new lease from the Herefordshire Council, Arena Racing Company ceased operations there in December 2012. with the final Thoroughbred race meeting being held on 16 December 2012. This ended over 240 years of racing at the course. It continued to be used for Arabian racing. It was also used by the North Herefordshire Hunt for a point to point in May 2014, two point to points in 2015, and also in 2016 when point to points were staged by the North Ledbury in April and the North Herefordshire Hunt at the end of May.

The course reopened for National Hunt racing on 6 October 2016, with 3 other fixtures also scheduled. The reopening fixture was attended by a crowd of 4,500, with Rather Be, trained by Nicky Henderson winning the first race, ridden by Andrew Tinkler.

In 2017 the course staged 11 National Hunt Fixtures spread between January and March and October to December. The North Herefordshire Hunt and Ledbury Point to Points were due to be staged at the course in the spring of 2017 but both were abandoned after an exceptionally dry spring led to unsafe hard ground. Two National Hunt meetings in the autumn of 2017 were transferred to Worcester after a dry late summer and autumn coupled with an inability to sufficiently water the course meant the ground was too hard to ensure safe racing ground.

In 2018 the track was allocated 11 days racing and picked up an extra day in April after several meetings around the country were cancelled due to the exceptionally wet and cold spring. The North Ledbury Point to Point was held in April. That was the only Point to Point held at the course following the decision of the North Herefordshire Hunt to switch venues after the cancellation of their 2017 meeting. The North Ledbury Hunt did use the course again in 2019 however no Point to Point Racing now takes place at the racecourse and both Hunts no longer hold a Point to Point meeting.

In August 2018 construction of a reservoir in the centre of the course commenced. This will enable the track to be watered without relying on a limited supply from a shared borehole. Use of the reservoir commenced in 2019.

Hereford's racing season runs from October to April. There are 15 fixtures in 2024.

== Other sporting events ==
In 1978 the racecourse hosted the final of Motorcycle's European Grasstrack Championship. A cricket ground which has hosted first-class cricket lies within the racecourse.

There is a sports centre on the east side of the course accessed off the A49 and some of the outdoor sports facilities are in the centre of the track.

There is a golf course located in the centre of the track.
