= Sky Sports Racing =

British television channel

- Logo used since 2025
- Broadcast area: United Kingdom; Ireland

Programming
- Picture format: 1080i HDTV

Ownership
- Owner: ATTHERACES Limited (Sky Group/Arena Racing Company)

History
- Launched: 1 May 2002 (original); 11 June 2004 (relaunch)
- Closed: 29 March 2004 (original)
- Former names: At The Races (2002–2019)

Links
- Website: www.skysports.com/racing

Availability

Streaming media
- At The Races Player: Watch live

Sky Sports Racing (formerly At The Races) is a British pay television channel devoted primarily to horse racing. The channel is operated by ATTHERACES Limited, a joint venture between Sky Group, Arena Racing Company and various racecourses. They also operate the website attheraces.com. The channel broadcasts coverage of domestic, European and international horse racing events. The channel also broadcasts some greyhound racing.

In January 2019, after previously operating autonomously from its sisters, the channel was re-launched as part of the Sky Sports family of channels.

== History ==
Current website logo

Former channel & website logo

It was originally launched on 1 May 2002 as Attheraces, a partnership between the aforementioned entities plus Channel Four Television Corporation. It stopped broadcasting on 29 March 2004 due to financial problems but, after restructuring, was relaunched on 11 June 2004 without Channel Four.

On 30 April 2018, it was announced that At The Races would be relaunched as part of the larger Sky Sports portfolio as Sky Sports Racing by the end of the year, being distributed widely via Sky Sports packages and platforms (including Sky Go).

Within the same month, it was announced Chester Race Company had signed a 10-year deal to bring Live Racing from Bangor-On-Dee and Chester to Sky Sports Racing from March 2019. In July 2018, it was also announced that beginning also in March 2019, it would also hold rights to Ascot. The rebranding occurred 1 January 2019 although the "At the Races" brand remains as the channel's parent company, while the website and app became the channel's digital partners.

== Programming ==
The channel starts broadcasting at 9 am every day. In the mornings on the hour, Racing News is shown, followed by reviews of previous days racing. This format is repeated several times and updated with interviews. Presenters change over in the early afternoon and the lead presenter is joined by a guest to discuss the afternoon's racing. Until 1 January 2019, it was produced at the SIS broadcast facility in Milton Keynes. It is now produced from the newly automated Studio G at Sky Campus in Isleworth.

- Racing Review
- The Racing Debate
- Get In
- Raceday Live
- Sky Sports Racing Stateside
- Australian Racing

== Presenters ==
- Robert 'Sir Bob' Cooper – On-course reporter
- Sean 'Boycie' Boyce – Studio presenter
- Matt Chapman – Studio presenter and on-course reporter. Also works for ITV Racing
- Darrell Williams – Studio presenter
- Anthony 'Enzo' Ennis – Studio presenter and commentator
- Luke Harvey – Occasional studio work (mainly Get In! (with Jason Weaver) and on-course reporter. Also works for ITV racing
- John Hunt – Studio presenter (also BBC Radio 5Live commentator)
- Simon Mapletoft – Occasional studio presenter and on-course reporter
- Jason Weaver – Studio presenter and on-course reporter. Also works for ITV racing
- Mike Cattermole – Studio presenter and commentator. Occasional on-course reporter (was also formerly a presenter for Channel 4 Racing)
- Zoey Bird – On-course reporter
- Alex Hammond – Studio presenter and on-course reporter
- Derek 'Tommo' Thompson – Studio presenter (was also formerly a presenter/commentator for Channel 4 Racing) and race commentator
- Hayley Moore - On-course reporter, younger sister of Ryan Moore
- Aly Vance - Studio presenter
- Kieran O'Sullivan - Studio presenter
- Hayley Turner - Jockey
- Martin Kelly – Studio presenter and occasional on-course reporter
- Jim McGrath – Reporter (was also formerly the BBC's main commentator)
- Mick Fitzgerald – On-Course reporter. Also works for ITV Racing
- Gina Bryce – Studio presenter and on-course reporter (was also formerly a presenter for Channel 4 Racing)
- Tim Caroll - Studio presenter
- John Blance - Studio presenter and race commentator
- Vanessa Ryle - On-course reporter
- Leonna Mayor - On-course reporter
- Rob Crawford - Greyhound Commentator

== Courses ==
The partner racecourses are:

- Ascot
- Bangor-on-Dee
- Bath
- Brighton
- Chepstow
- Chester
- Doncaster
- Ffos Las
- Fontwell
- Great Yarmouth
- Hereford
- Hexham
- Lingfield Park
- Newbury
- Newcastle
- Newton Abbot
- Plumpton
- Ripon
- Sedgefield
- Southwell
- Towcester
- Uttoxeter
- Windsor
- Wolverhampton
- Worcester
