= Plumpton Racecourse =

Horse racing venue in East Sussex, England

Coordinates: 50°55′29.61″N 0°03′41.82″W

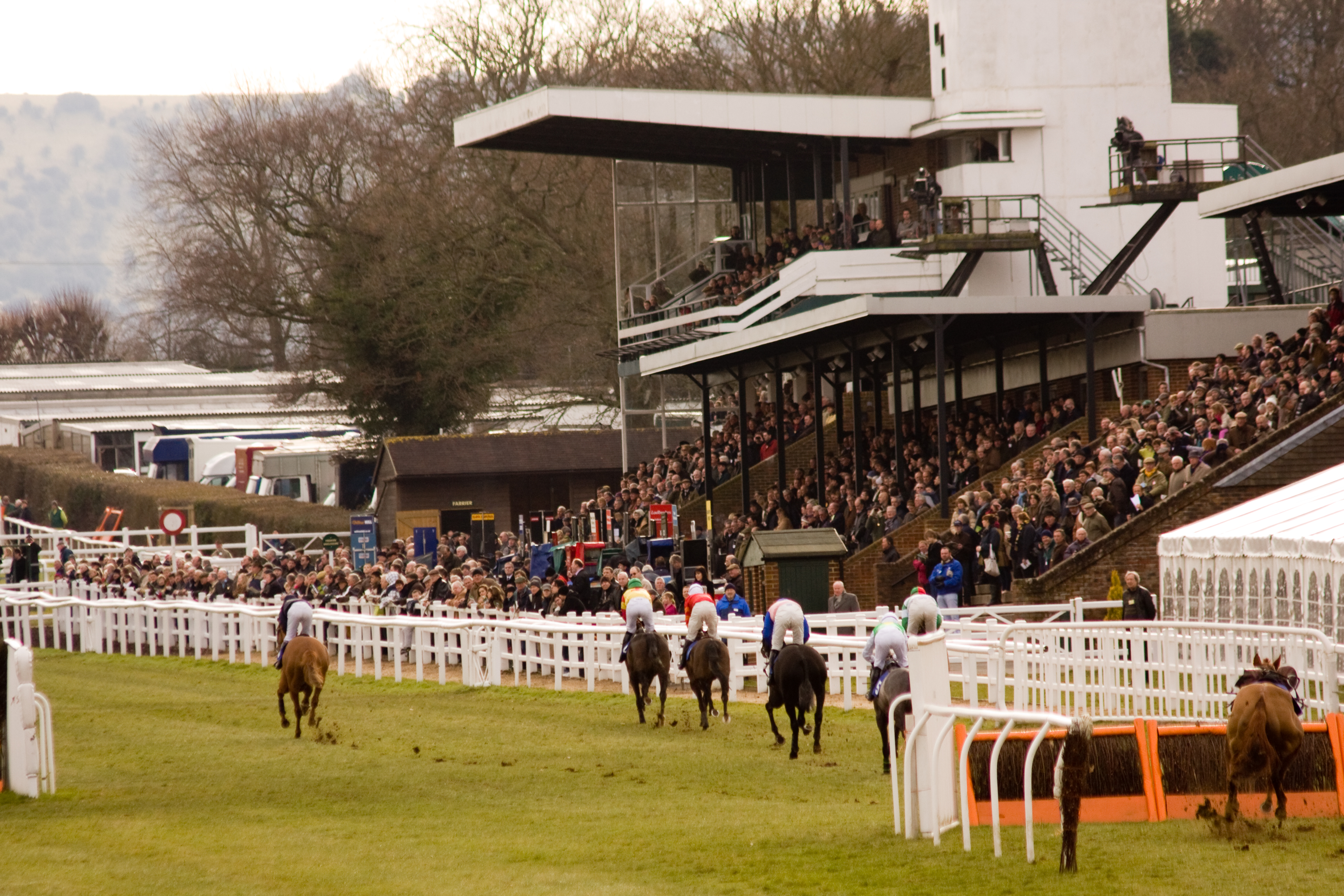
- The stands in 2010
- Interactive map of Plumpton Racecourse
- Location: Plumpton, East Sussex
- Owned by: Plumpton Racecourse Ltd.
- Date opened: 1884
- Screened on: Sky Sports Racing
- Course type: National Hunt
- Notable races: Sussex National Handicap Chase

Plumpton Racecourse is a National Hunt racecourse in the village of Plumpton, East Sussex near Lewes and Brighton. Racing first took place at Plumpton in 1884.

Its most notable race is the Sussex National Handicap Chase.

== History ==
Plumpton Racecourse opened in 1884, but the first events at the course took place in 1876 with Thomas Henry Case undertaking hare coursing. In 1961, Isidore Kerman bought the course and significantly improved the facilities, with the Southdown Stand opening in 1987 under his stewardship. The Queen Mother had her first winner at Plumpton with Super Fox in 1963. In 1998, the course was sold to Adrian Pratt and Peter Savill.

Several notable charity races have taken place at Plumpton. In March 1980, HRH The Prince of Wales, riding the favourite Long Wharf, finished second to television presenter Derek Thompson in the Mad Hatters private sweepstake. In October 2001, television presenters Alice Plunkett and Alex Hammond finished 1st and 2nd respectively in a charity race.

In 2005, Voy Por Ustedes won the Coral Casino Handicap Chase on his way to winning the Arkle Challenge Trophy at the Cheltenham Festival.

On 9 February 2009, AP McCoy won his 3,000th race at Plumpton.

== The course ==
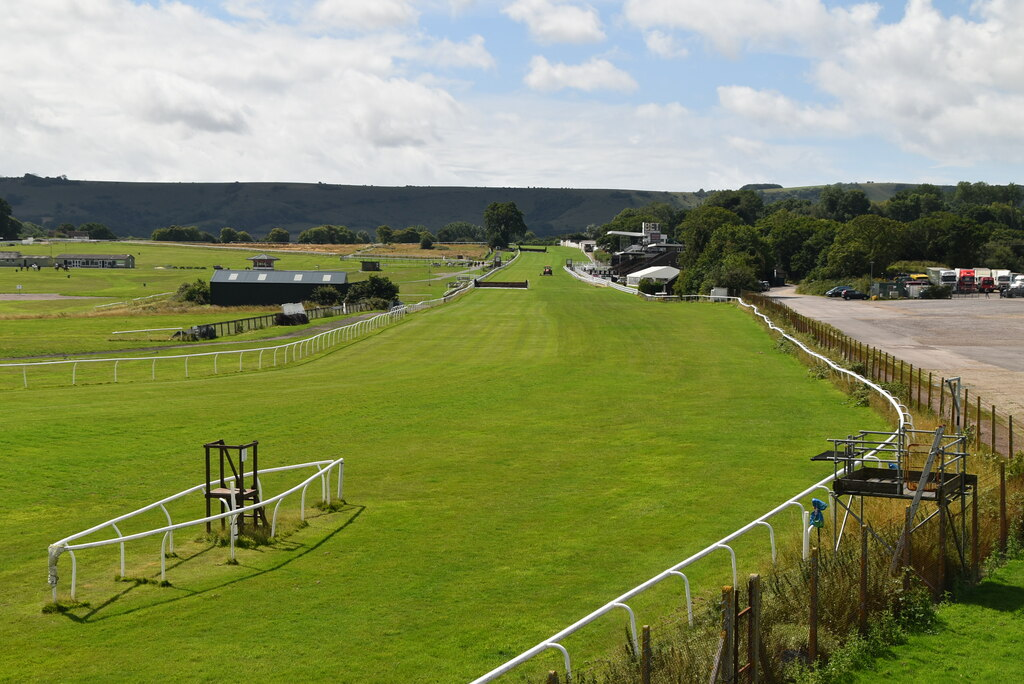
The home straight in 2023

Plumpton is a tight, undulating, left-handed course that features only National Hunt racing. There are 7 fences. Both the hurdle course and chase course feature the same, uphill run in to the winners post. There has been no water jump on the chase course since April 1999.

Plumpton railway station borders to the north and has a footbridge link to the track.
