= Newton Abbot Racecourse =

Horse racing venue in England

Coordinates: 50°32′19″N 3°35′52″W

Newton Abbot
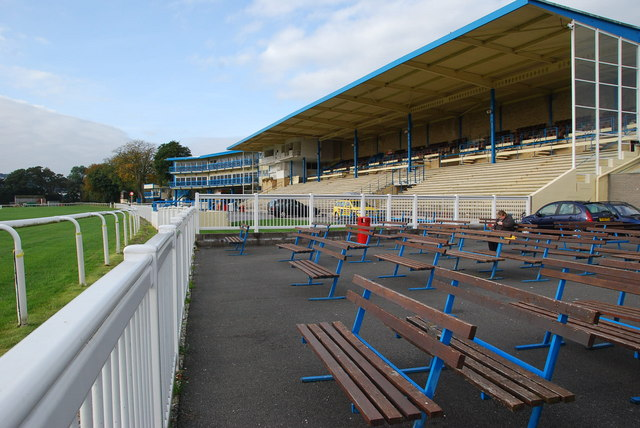
- The front of the grandstand
- Interactive map of Newton Abbot
- Location: Newton Abbot, Devon
- Owned by: Newton Abbot Racing Ltd.
- Screened on: Sky Sports Racing
- Course type: National Hunt

Newton Abbot Racecourse is a thoroughbred horse racing venue located on the north bank of the River Teign in the parishes of Kingsteignton and Teigngrace just north of Newton Abbot, Devon, England. The course is a tight, flat left-handed oval of about 1 mile 1 furlong. There are seven relatively easy fences to a circuit and a very short run in to the finish.

== History ==
The course was first established in 1866 when the 91-acre (370,000 m^{2}) site was purchased. The main grandstand was built in 1969 and opened by the Queen Mother, while the corporate facilities were opened in 1990.

== Corporate hospitality ==
The racecourse has a variety of corporate meeting, conference rooms, suites and private boxes as well as cafeterias, bars and two restaurants: 'The Winning Post' and 'The Paddock'. Many of the rooms have views across the racecourse, whilst there is parking in and around the venue for 5,000 cars.

== Other events at the racecourse ==
The racecourse holds monthly car boot sales and regular antiques fairs. Ladies Day is held in June and there are a series of evening races.

== Greyhound racing ==
A greyhound racing track was constructed on the final turn inside the racecourse in 1974 following the closure of the Halfway Greyhound Track in Kingskerswell. The opening night was 2 May 1974 and races featured regularly until 2005. The track featured a grandstand that could be dismantled when horse racing took place. It was an all-sand circuit and had an 'Inside Sumner' hare system.

The greyhound racing was independent (not affiliated to the sports governing body the National Greyhound Racing Club) and was known as a flapping track which was the nickname given to independent tracks. The track circumference was 437 yards and the race distances were 325, 482, 525 and 762 yards with the main events being the Newton Abbot Derby and Newton Abbot St Leger. Facilities included five on-course bookmakers and a forecast only primitive ticket machine totalisator.
