= Bangor-on-Dee Racecourse =

Horse racing venue in Wales

Bangor-on-Dee
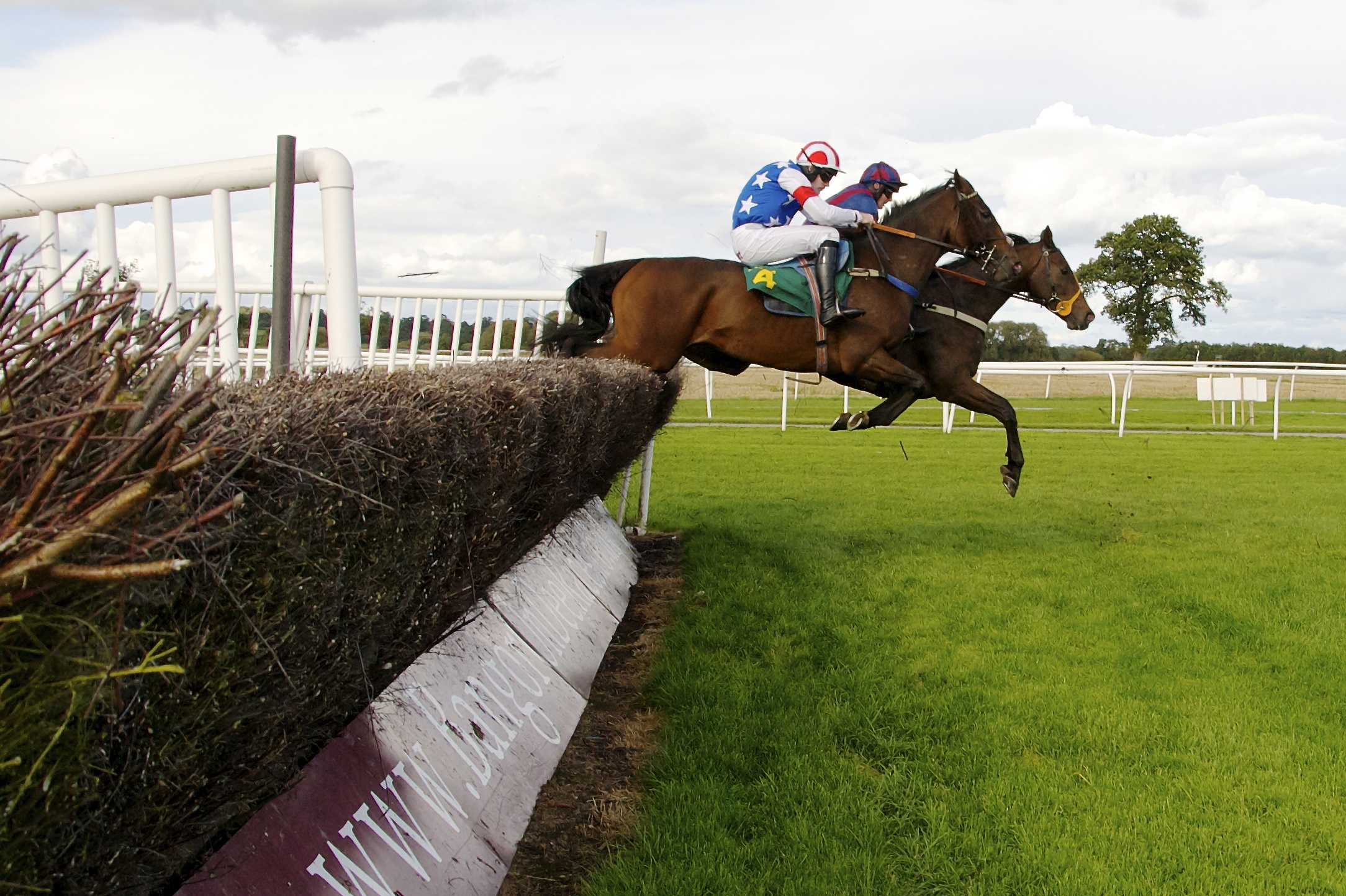
- Horses jumping a fence
- Interactive map of Bangor-on-Dee
- Location: Bangor-on-Dee, Wrexham, Wales, United Kingdom
- Coordinates: 52°59′46″N 2°55′41″W
- Owned by: Chester Race Company Ltd.
- Date opened: 1859
- Screened on: Sky Sports Racing
- Course type: National Hunt

Bangor-on-Dee Racecourse is a thoroughbred horse racing venue located in Bangor-on-Dee near Wrexham, Wales, United Kingdom.

It is a left-handed National Hunt racecourse, and does not have a grandstand.

== History ==
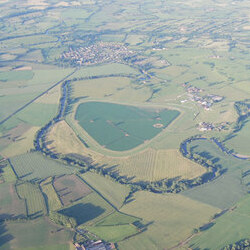
Aerial view of the racecourse (dark green), with Bangor-on-Dee in the distance and the River Dee meandering around the venue.

Racing first took place at Bangor on Dee Racecourse in February 1859, and has since taken place regularly except during the wars.

Since 2006 Bangor has hosted amateur Point-to-Point races run by local hunts. The course for the Point-to-Point is on the inside of the main track and races are run right-handed.

In May 2012, all former Tote betting positions were replaced by the racecourse's own in-house bangorBET betting system.

The Clerk of the Course is Andrew Tulloch who also holds that position at sister track Chester, where flat racing takes place. The General Manager is Paddy Chesters.
