= Ffos Las Racecourse =

Horse racing venue in South Wales

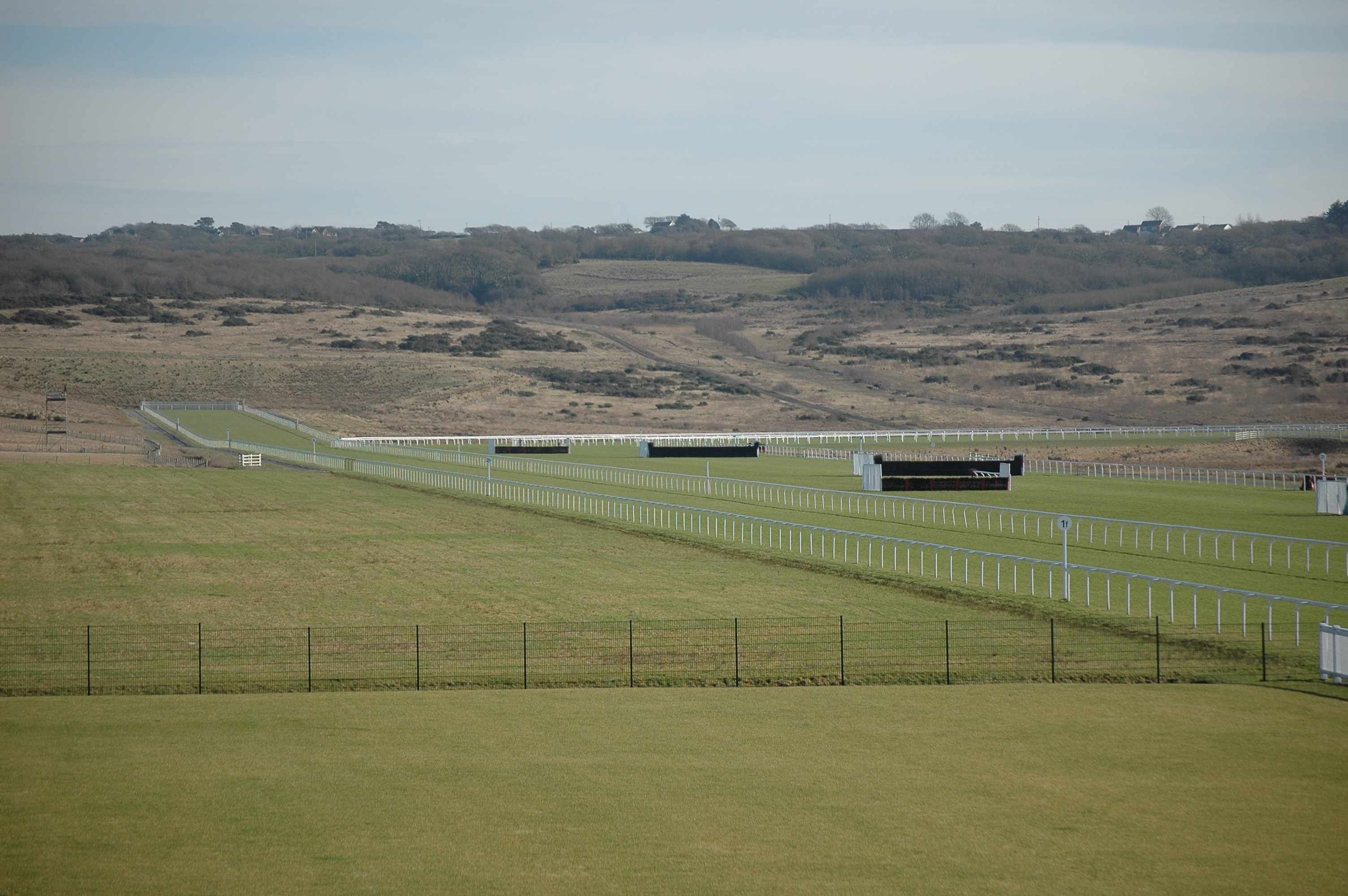
- The racecourse in 2011
- Interactive map of Ffos Las Racecourse
- Location: Ffos Las, Carmarthenshire, Wales, United Kingdom
- Coordinates: 51.73112°N 4.23998°W
- Owned by: Arena Racing Company
- Date opened: 18 June 2009
- Screened on: Sky Sports Racing
- Course type: Flat and National Hunt

The Ffos Las Racecourse & Conference Centre is a Welsh horse racing, equestrian sports and conferencing venue situated in Ffos Las, Wales. The Ffos Las racecourse was built at the site of an open cast coal mine after mining operations ceased.

== Development ==
After the completion of the first phase of construction for a first race meeting in June 2009, the Ffos Las racecourse became the first new National Hunt racecourse to be built in the United Kingdom for 80 years, and Wales's third racecourse. Ffos Las Racecourse was built at a cost of £20 million. The racecourse development site is about 600 acres (2.4 km^{2}) in size and is located in a natural amphitheatre setting. The racetrack itself is an oval which is 12 furlongs in length and has a flat topography.

The initial phase of the development was completed in 2009 and features:

- Turf National Hunt & flat racing
- Enclosure & Grandstand
- Hotel, pub, restaurant, etc.
- Technical Facilities
- Betting Facilities
- Residential Development for racing staff

== Opening meetings ==
The British Horseracing Board initially confirmed a programme of eight race meetings for 2009. An extra fixture was added to the schedule later on creating a two-day flat event in September.

The Ffos Las Racecourse opened on 18 June 2009 when it held its first race meeting to a sell-out crowd of 10,000. It was an evening National Hunt meeting which included a Ladies Night. The first ever race at Ffos Las was won by 15-8 second favourite Plunkett ridden by Donal Fahy, trained by Evan Williams, and owned by Hywel Jones. The first race at Ffos Las to feature Arabians was held on 27 June 2009.

The first ever flat race at Ffos Las, the EBF/Jamie Yeates Memorial Maiden Stakes, was held on 21 July 2009. The race was dedicated to schoolboy and aspiring jockey Jamie Yeates from nearby Llanelli, who died under tragic circumstances the previous January. The winner of the race was Dream Queen ridden by Michael Hills. Dream Queen was trained by Barry Hills.

The official opening ceremony, conducted by racing commentator Sir Peter O'Sullevan, was held on 28 August 2009, with an audience of over 12,000. Following the final race of the day, there was a concert with Cerys Matthews performing.

The first ever race meeting featuring harness racing was held on 9 May 2010.

== Plans ==
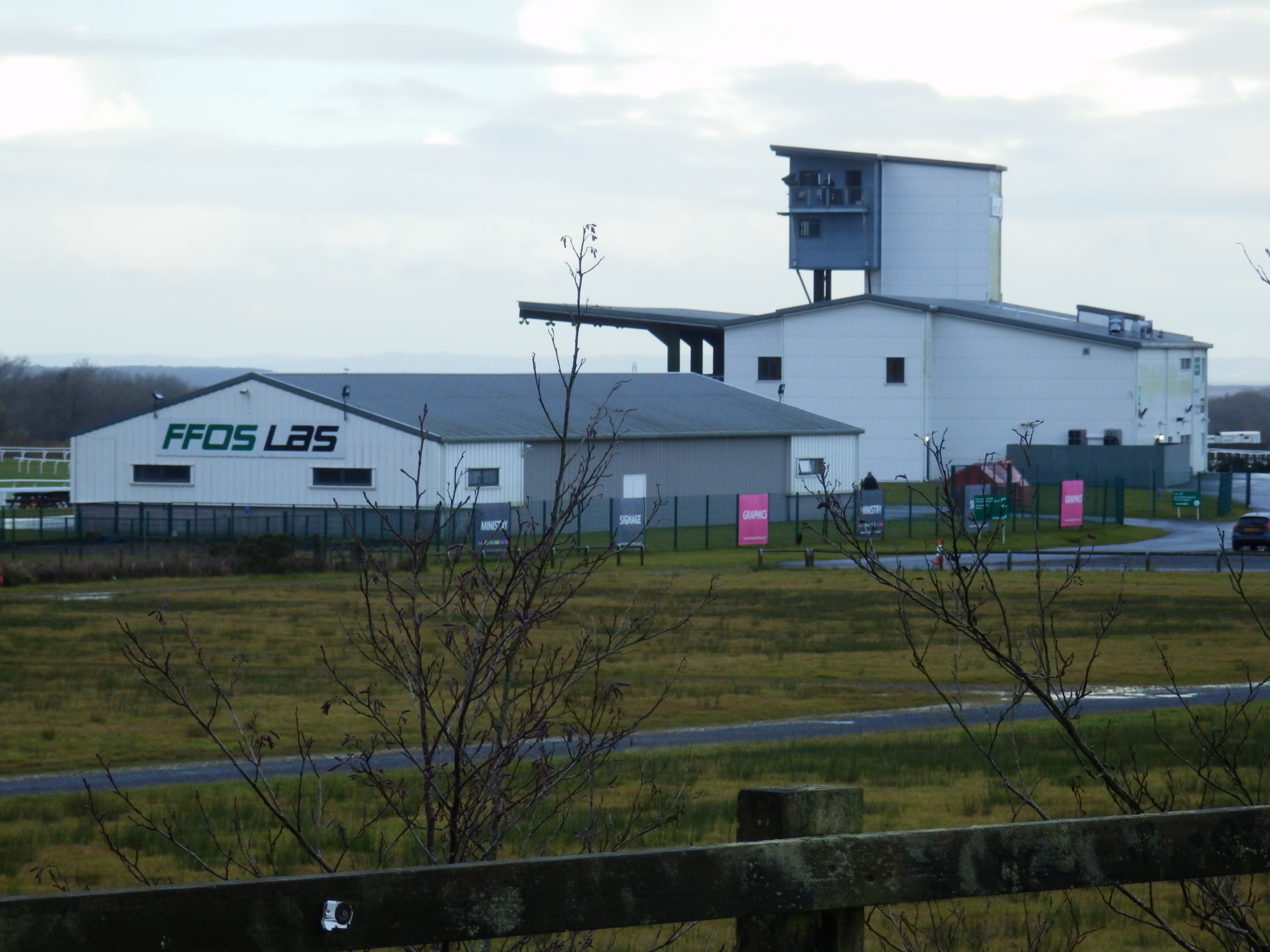
The stands

The racecourse owners intend to introduce a new Celtic Festival in future years to be held around St. David's Day. The racecourse developers plan for the venue to have a capacity for 20,000 people and there will be 120 horse boxes.

Future developments at the racecourse will include:

- Development of Hotel & Leisure Facilities
- Equestrian Centre, Eventing, Point-to-Point
- Racecourse Training Establishment
- Live/work small holdings

The racecourse management intend to stage other types of equestrian events at Ffos Las including Show jumping, hunter chase meetings, pony racing and harness racing.

== Transport ==
First Cymru Buses operate a bus between Llanelli and Carmarthen, number 197 from Monday to Saturday, which stops at the racecourse entrance. The Ffos Las racecourse offers a dedicated shuttle bus service on race days between Llanelli railway station and the racecourse.

By sea, Pembroke Dock is about 1 hour away to the west and Fishguard is about 1 hour 15 minutes away to the west. Ferries from both Pembroke Dock and Fishguard sail to and from Rosslare in the Republic of Ireland.

Pembrey Airport, which handles private, charter flights and fueling facilities 24/7. It is a 10-minute drive away from the racecourse with a restaurant and seven miles of blue ribbon beach. Helicopters can land at the racecourse by arrangement with the racecourse management and refuel at the airport if required.

Ffos Las is approximately 12 miles (25 minutes) from Junction 48 of the M4 motorway.
