= Worcester Racecourse =

National Hunt racecourse in England

Coordinates: 52°11′57″N 2°13′59″W

Worcester
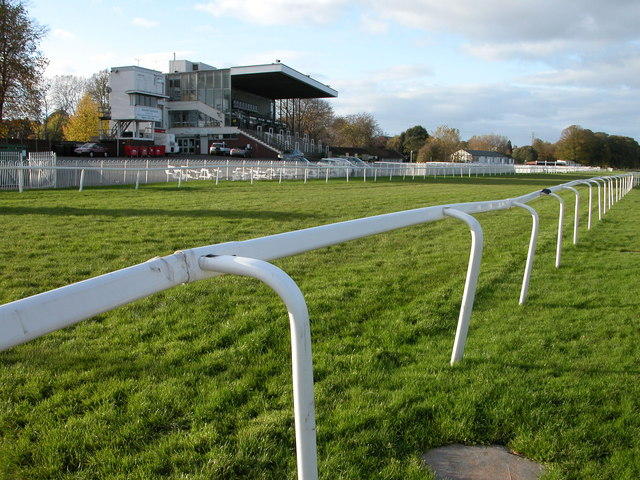
- Interactive map of Worcester
- Location: Worcester, Worcestershire
- Owned by: Worcester City Council (Leased to Arena Leisure Plc)
- Screened on: Sky Sports Racing
- Course type: National Hunt

Worcester Racecourse is a thoroughbred horse racing venue located in the city of Worcester, Worcestershire, England. Horse racing has taken place here since at least 1718. It staged Flat racing until 1966 but has since staged National Hunt racing only.

It is popularly known by Worcester residents as 'Pitchcroft' and is just short of 100 acres. From 1893 the Worcester Rugby Club played on ground enclosed by the racecourse for a number of years. In 1902 Berwick Rangers and Worcester Rovers football clubs amalgamated taking the present name of Worcester City F.C. playing on an enclosed area of the racecourse called Severn Terrace (behind the present Swan Theatre) until the start of the 1905 season.

The course is laid out as a left handed oval circuit of about 13 furlongs (approximately 2,615 metres) in length, with nine fences (five down the back straight and four in the home straight) and situated by the east bank of the River Severn and the north side of Worcester Bridge.

When National Hunt racing through the summer was introduced in 1995 (“summer jumping”) Worcester was one of the first courses where it took place, and it has continued ever since.

During the 2007 floods, the racecourse was inundated and all the fixtures after June 30 had to be cancelled.

In addition to horse racing, the racecourse hosts various events throughout the year. One of the most notable is the Worcester Balloon Festival, an annual event featuring hot air balloon displays, live entertainment, and family activities.

A new weighing room complex is due to be completed by 7 May 2024, the first of 20 fixtures this year.

== Controversy ==
The UK Animal Rights group, Animal Aid, has reported that 96 horses have died at Worcester Racecourse since 2007.
