= Great Yarmouth Racecourse =

Horse racing venue in England

Great Yarmouth
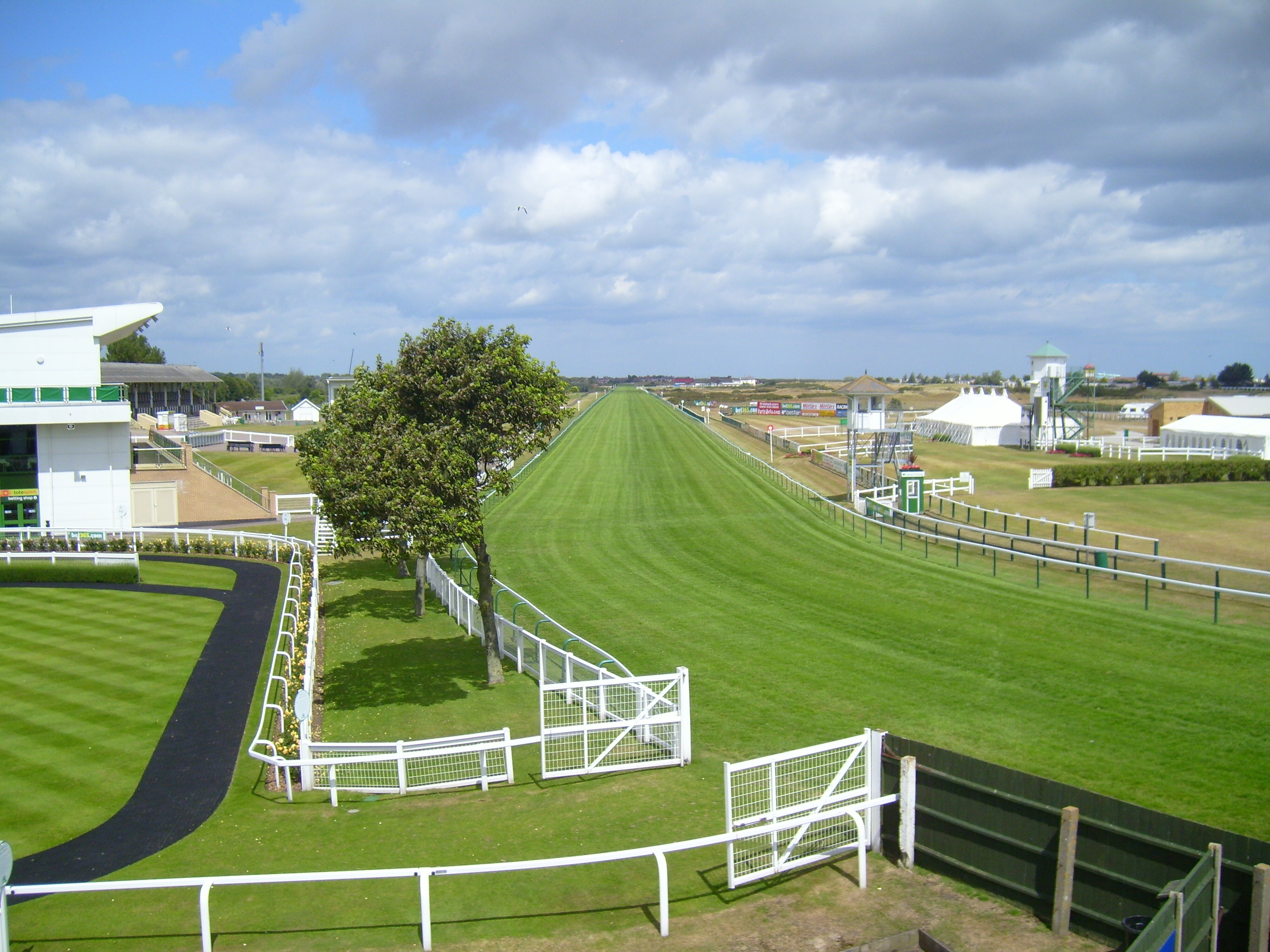
- Looking down the home straight
- Interactive map of Great Yarmouth
- Location: Great Yarmouth, Norfolk
- Coordinates: 52°37′58″N 1°44′03″E
- Owned by: Arena Racing Company
- Screened on: Sky Sports Racing
- Course type: Flat

Great Yarmouth Racecourse is a horse racing course located a mile north of Great Yarmouth town centre, owned by Arena Racing Company. The track takes the form of a narrow oblong of a mile and five furlongs round, with two long straights about five furlongs in length. It is a left-handed course, used for flat racing only. An extension to the finishing straight allows races of up to a mile to be run on the straight course.

== History ==
Racing at Great Yarmouth was first recorded in 1715, when a lease was granted by the Great Yarmouth Corporation to a group of innkeepers for some land where they could stage race meetings. Racing may well have been taking place there before that date. It was probably intermittent during the eighteenth century, and will often have coincided with the annual town fair. Diverse events such as donkey races and chasing a pig with a soaped tail were held. Not until 1810 did the official Racing Calendar begin to record meetings with thoroughbred races and sufficient prize money. This course, on the South Denes, then became established. A two-day meeting was held in the late summer each year. Not until 1866 did the number of fixtures start to increase.

Racing resumed after suspension during World War I, but in 1920 the course was moved to the adjacent North Denes, in the face of pressure from the local fishing industry to expand its premises onto land on the South Denes. Two grandstands were dismantled and relocated to the North Denes, where they are still in use today.

The local authority had taken over ownership of the course in 1904, and for most of the twentieth century the racecourse benefited local people, not only by providing entertainment but also because its profits helped to keep their rates down. Since 2001 they have been the minority shareholder in a new company set up to run the course. The racecourse was owned by a private company, Northern Racing, which was the majority shareholder. During that time they were able to finance improvements that the Council could not, including the construction of an additional grandstand. The course merged in 2012 with Arena Racing Company.

== Notable races ==
Month	DOW	Race Name	Type	Grade	Distance	Age/Sex
September	Wednesday	John Musker Fillies' Stakes	Flat	Conditions	1m 2f 21y	3yo + f

The most valuable race is the John Musker Fillies' Stakes, run over a mile and a quarter in September. The proximity of the course to Newmarket means any of the races for two-year-olds can be particularly instructive, as some of these young horses go on to compete in and win valuable races.

In 1998 Dubai Millennium won his debut at Great Yarmouth impressively, ridden by Frankie Dettori, before becoming one of the best horses to run for the worldwide Godolphin operation, owned by the Dubai royal family. Since then Great Yarmouth winners included Ouija Board, who went on to win the English and Irish Oaks before scoring at the Breeders Cup, the annual international horse racing championships in the USA. Wilko, Raven's Pass and Donativum were others that won at Great Yarmouth en route to future Breeders Cup glory.
