= Fontwell Park Racecourse =

Horse racing venue in Fontwell, England

Coordinates: 50°51′9″N 0°39′23″W

Fontwell Park

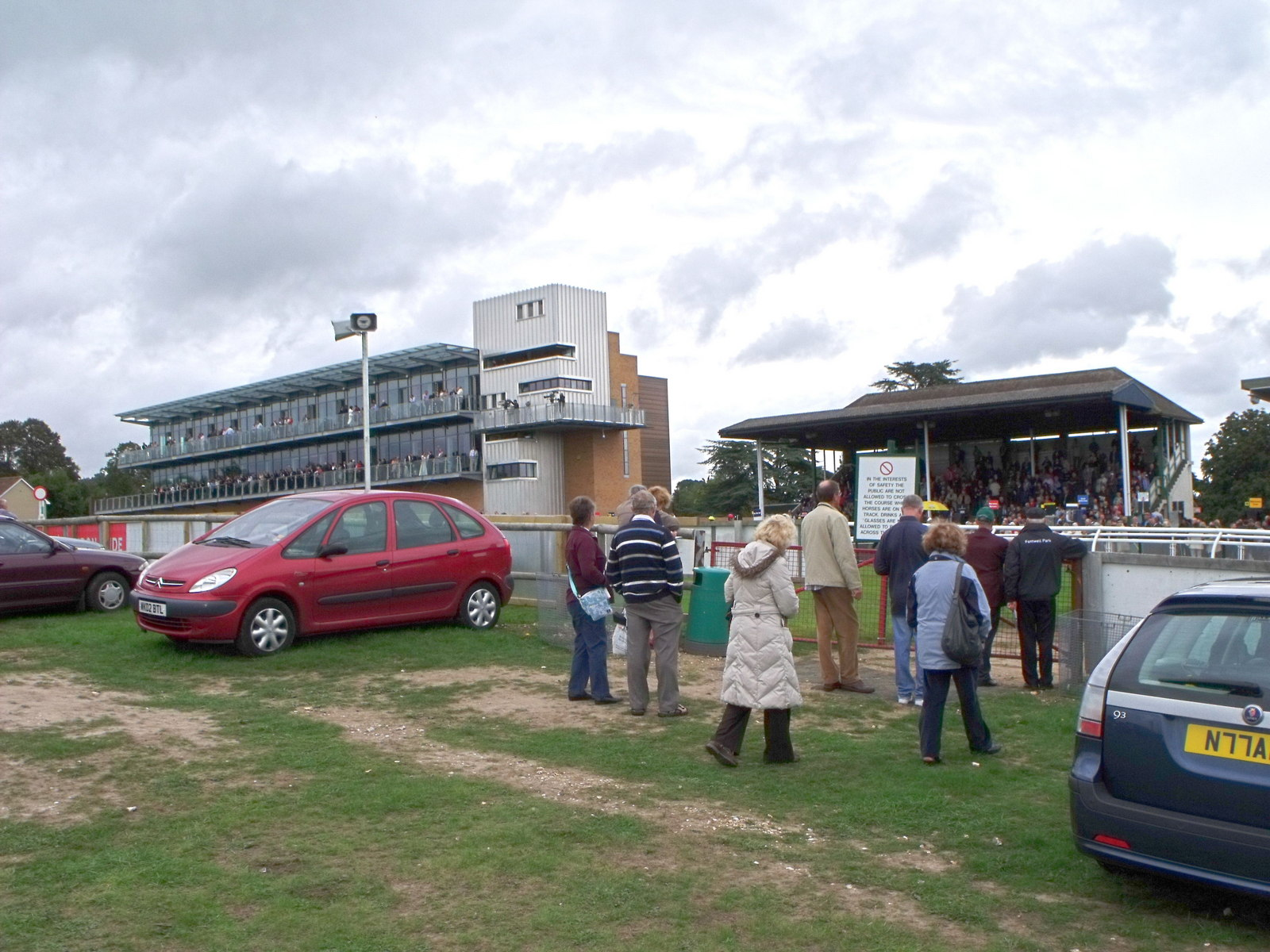
- The stands
- Interactive map of Fontwell Park
- Location: Fontwell, West Sussex
- Owned by: Arena Racing Company
- Date opened: 1924
- Screened on: Sky Sports Racing
- Course type: National Hunt
- Notable races: National Spirit Hurdle

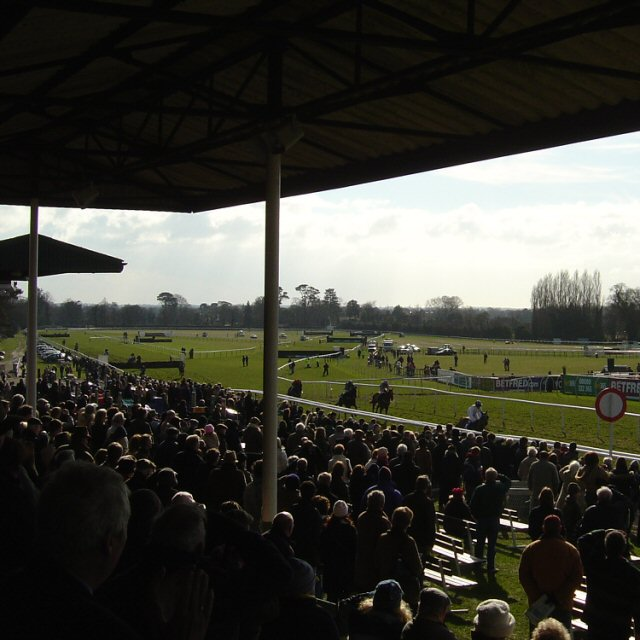

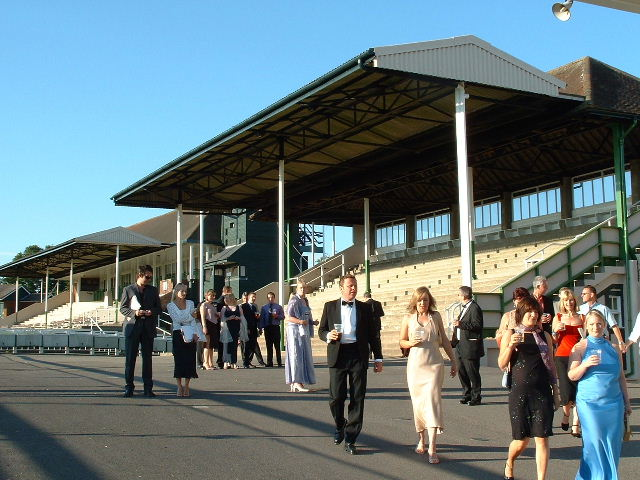

Fontwell Park Racecourse is a horse racing course located in the village of Fontwell in West Sussex, England, owned by ARC Racing. It features a unique figure of eight steeplechase course and a conventional oval hurdles course.

Fontwell Park was founded by Alfred Day who trained racehorses at The Hermitage, by the Chichester to Arundel road, from 1887. Day returned the name Fontwell to common use after researching the history of the area, and by 1924 he had purchased enough land to open the racecourse. The hurdles track was a normal shape, but the steeplechase course was laid out in a figure of eight shape to use the space on the site. The first meeting took place on 21 May 1924. The grandstand and the weighing room were built with thatched roofs. The opening race was won by Gem, the 5/4 favourite Gem, ridden by jockey Fred Rees.

At the course in October 1949, Princess Elizabeth (later Queen Elizabeth II) had her first winner as an owner when Monaveen won the Chichester Handicap Chase. In 1984, John Francome rode his 1,036th career winner at Fontwell Park, passing Stan Mellor's record for a National Hunt jockey - Francome's record has subsequently been beaten.

The feature race of the season at Fontwell Park is the Grade Two National Spirit Hurdle run over a distance of two miles and four furlongs in February. It is a recognised Cheltenham Festival trial. My Way de Solzen, trained by Alan King, won the race in 2006 before winning the World Hurdle. Lough Derg, trained by David Pipe and owned by Bill Frewen, took the prize in 2008 and 2009. Trenchant (Alan King/Robert Thornton) took the prize in 2010 and Celestial Halo (Paul Nicholls/Harry Skelton) was the winner in 2011.

A new £6.5m Grandstand opened in the Premier Enclosure in August 2010 sponsored by events and plant hire company Winner Group.

The course has 22 fixtures in 2024.

== Notable races ==
Month	DOW	Race Name	Type	Grade	Distance	Age/Sex
February	Sunday	National Spirit Hurdle	Hurdle	Grade 2	2m 3f	4yo +
November	Sunday	Southern National	Chase	Class 3	3m 3½f	4yo +
