= Danckwerts =

Danckwerts is a surname. Notable people with the surname include:

- Dankwart Danckwerts (born 1933), German sociologist
- William Otto Adolph Julius Danckwerts (1853–1914), British lawyer and Privy Counsellor, and father of:
  - Sir Harold Danckwerts (1888–1978), British lawyer, judge and Privy Counsellor
  - Rear-Admiral Victor Danckwerts (1890–1944), Royal Navy admiral and father of:
    - Peter Danckwerts, chemical engineer and George Cross recipient

== See also ==
- Danckerts, a surname
