= Department of Chemical Engineering and Biotechnology, University of Cambridge =

Department of the University of Cambridge

Department of Chemical Engineering and Biotechnology
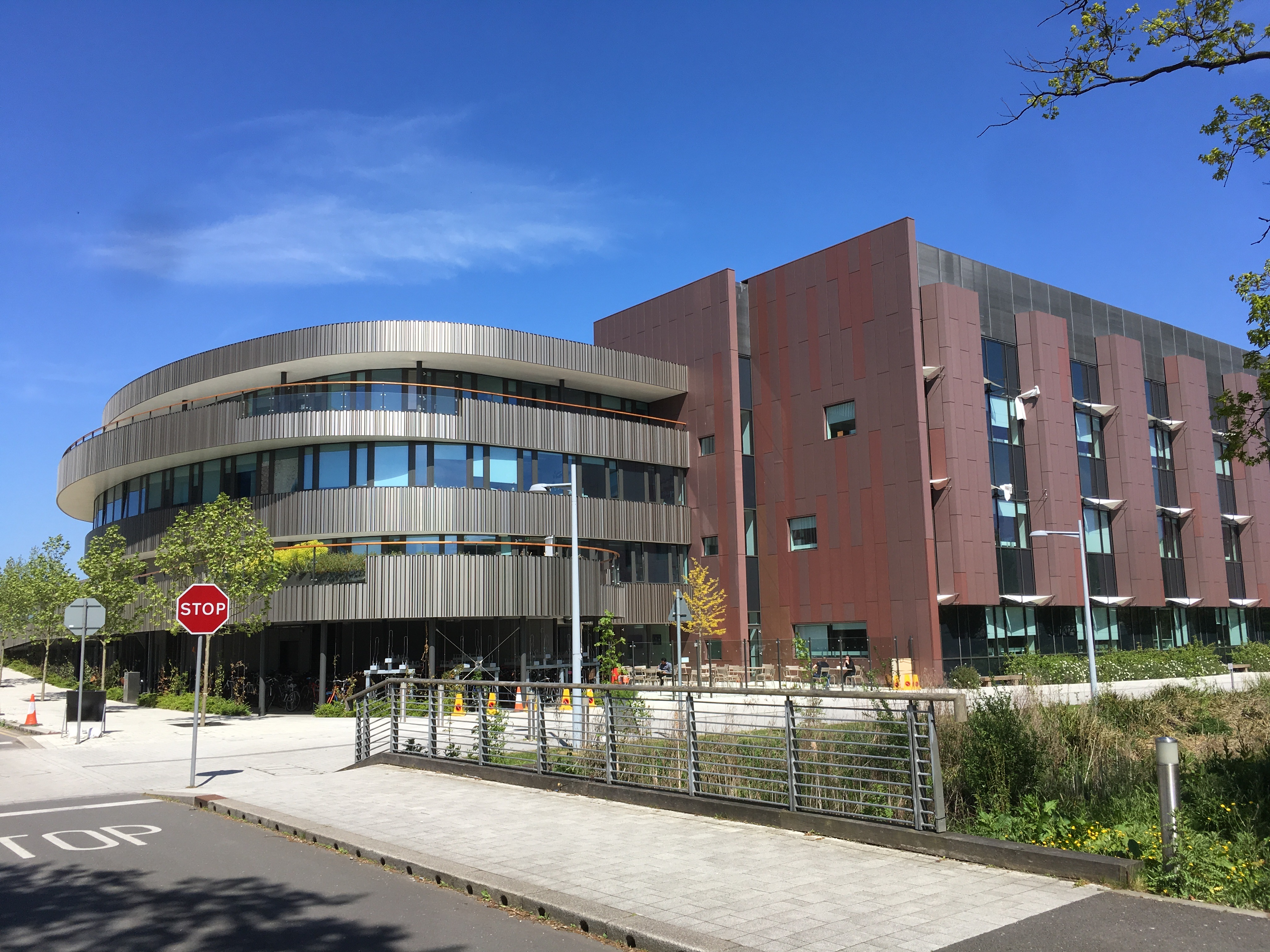
- Established: 1945
- Affiliations: University of Cambridge
- Head of Department: Clemens Kaminski
- Academic staff: 29
- Undergraduates: 200
- Postgraduates: 170
- Location: Cambridge, United Kingdom; 52.209208°N 0.085819°E
- Website: www.ceb.cam.ac.uk

The Department of Chemical Engineering and Biotechnology (CEB) is an academic department within the School of Technology at the University of Cambridge. The department trains undergraduate students and conducts original research at the interfaces between engineering, chemistry, biology and physics. It conducts research in collaboration with industrial partners. Its research programmes encompass sustainable reaction engineering, chemical product and process design, healthcare, measurement, and materials science. It conducts biotechnology research with chemical engineering at the science-engineering interface.

== Notable staff ==
As of 2026 notable staff include

- Sabine Bahn
- Patrick Barrie
- Howard Chase
- Lynn Gladden
- Elizabeth A. H. Hall
- Ross D. King
- Róisín Owens

=== Heads of department ===
These include heads of the former Department of Chemical Engineering and Institute of Biotechnology which merged to form the current department.

- Lisa Hall
- John Dennis
- Lynn Gladden
- John Davidson
- Peter Danckwerts

=== Alumni ===
Former staff include:

- Francis Thomas Bacon
- John Bridgwater
- Silvana Cardoso

== History ==
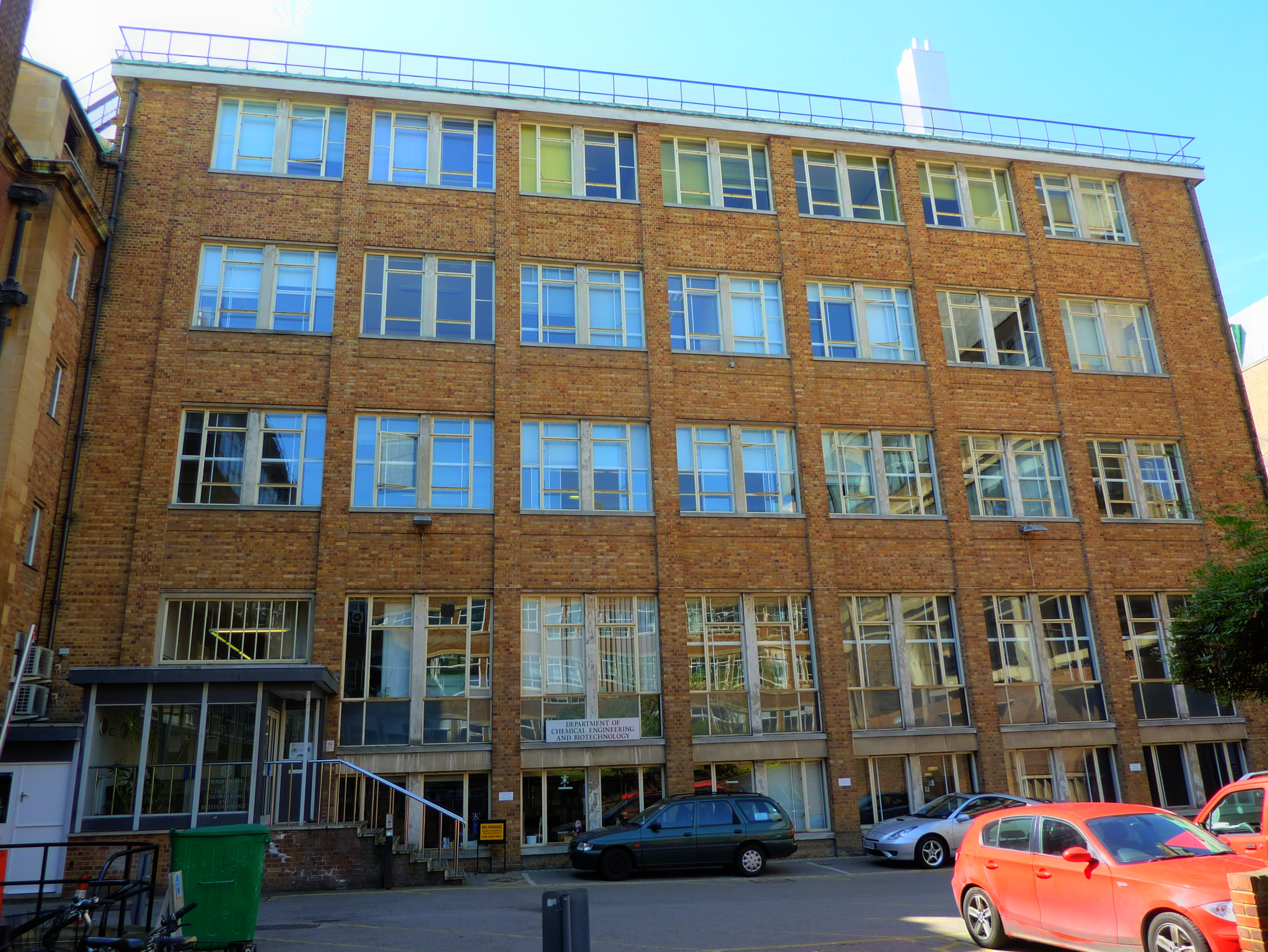
The old Shell building on Pembroke Street

In 1945, the university received an endowment from Shell for a chemical engineering department and chair. The first Shell Professor was Terence Fox, appointed in 1946. The undergraduate Tripos course in Chemical Engineering began in 1948, consisting of one year of the Engineering or Natural Sciences Tripos before specialising in chemical engineering. Peter Danckwerts was head of department from 1959 to 1975 and then John Davidson became Shell Professor and Head of department in 1975. He held the post until 1993 when he retired.

in 2008, the Department of Chemical Engineering merged with the Institute of Biotechnology to become the Department of Chemical Engineering and Biotechnology.

Until 2017, the department's main centre of activity was the Shell building on Pembroke Street on the New Museums Site, to the south of Cambridge city centre. In 2017, the department moved over to a new building on Philippa Fawcett Drive on the West Cambridge site.

The building was officially opened by the chancellor of the university, David Sainsbury, Baron Sainsbury of Turville, on 24 April 2018. The Department began teaching an undergraduate Tripos course titled "Chemical Engineering and Biotechnology" separately from the Engineering and Natural Sciences Tripos courses in October 2023. The course was ranked first in the UK for chemical engineering by the Complete University Guide in 2026.
