= Northwood College =

Northwood College for Girls

Location
- Maxwell Road; Northwood; Greater London, HA6 2YE; England; 51.6098°N 0.4279°W

Information
- Type: Private school
- Established: 1870
- School district: Hillingdon
- Department for Education URN: 102452 Tables
- Head: Mrs Rebecca Brown
- Gender: Girls
- Age: 3 to 18
- Enrolment: 930 as of October 2015
- Houses: Briary, Endsleigh, Buchan, Heathfield
- Website: https://www.northwoodcollege.gdst.net/

Northwood College for Girls is a private day school for girls aged 3 to 18. The school was founded in 1870 and is located in Northwood, London, England.

== History ==
Northwood College for Girls is an independent day school for girls aged 3 to 18 and located in Northwood, London, England.

The school was originally located in Regent Square in 1870, although little is known about this era. In 1878 the school moved to Endsleigh Gardens in Eaton Square, and its Headmistress (and founder) was Miss Buchan-Smith. At this time the school had between 20 and 30 boarders and a few day girls and boys in the nursery. Although the priorities of education in the later nineteenth differed to the ambitions that exist today, there were some similarities, with Miss Buchan-Smith wanting her girls to be well educated with interests beyond the classroom.

In 1892 the school moved out of central London to Northwood (in 1871 the area was described as "a destitute district near Moor Park"), where a railway station had opened five years earlier helping make Northwood, about 25 minutes from central London, more desirable. Many of the area's roads were named after the Carew landowner family, including Maxwell Road. Development of the area aimed to attract affluent residents, with houses selling in Maxwell Road for £750 to £1,300, making it one of the wealthiest in the neighbourhood.

In 1893 the School reopened in Northwood with 20 boarders and 2 day girls; The Briary was also acquired for boys. Over the next 15 years further land was acquired which included the playing fields. In 1899 the school built a gymnasium, which was also used as an Assembly Hall. Whilst in 1907 with more accommodation needed the Briary boys moved to Duck Hill and their building was extended and became a Junior School House. In 1911 the Dining Hall was built and Miss Buchan-Smith retired.

Miss Hay became Headmistress for two years and in 1913 Miss Agnes White became Headmistress, remaining in this post for 17 years. Miss White oversaw a period of growth in the School, with pupil numbers increasing from 71 students in 1914 to 147 students in 1922. There was also a shift with the number of day girls exceeding the number of boarders.

Miss White was succeeded by Miss Potts, who was Headmistress from 1930 to 1938. But the next stage of growth for the school was overseen by Miss Worger, who was Headmistress for 28 years. Miss Worger aimed to increase student numbers to 500, and to enable this to happen 10 new classrooms were needed immediately, as well as a new hall, science labs and art and craft rooms. The building of the Manor started in 1962; this meant the school was able to accommodate 400 students by 1963.

The Upper School building was originally constructed in 1979 as the Junior School, only changing its function in 1996. The pavilion that contains the Textiles and Home economic rooms are also a recent addition being constructed in 1999.

A sports hall and pool were developed in 1991, on the site of an outdoor pool built in 1949. The original gymnasium is now the Centenary Library. Music and performing arts facilities moved from Wray Lodge (now used by administrative staff) to a purpose-built performing arts centre in

In 2005 and 2009 an Early Years Centre (now called Bluebelle House) was opened. In 2009, Miss Pain became Headmistress and in 2014, the school merged with Heathfield School, Pinner and became a member of the Girls' Day School Trust, with the name 'Northwood College GDST'.

Miss Pain retired in 2018 and Mrs Hubble became Headmistress. In 2019, the refurbished Centenary Library was opened and the Swimming Pool renovated as part of a £1.8m project in modernisation of the Sports Centre. Mrs Hubble has now unveiled plans for a new Science and Sixth Form building.

== Head Mistresses ==
1878–1911 - Miss Buchan Smith

1911–1913 - Miss Hay

1913–1930 - Miss White

1930–1938 - Miss Potts

1938–1966 - Miss Worger

1967-1986 - Miss Hillyer-Cole

1986–1991 - Mrs Dalton

1991-2002 - Mrs Mayou

2002-2008 - Mrs Mercer

2009–2018 - Miss Pain

2018-2021 - Mrs Hubble

From 2021 - Mrs Brown

== House system ==
Northwood College has four houses. They are all named after features from the school's history, and Heathfield:

- Endsleigh - The school was founded in Endsleigh Gardens.
- Briary - The Briary was a building which was used to house boys from 1893 to 1907.
- Buchan- The school's founder was Miss Buchan-Smith.
- Heathfield - After Heathfield School.

== Notable Former Pupils ==
- Carrie Hope Fletcher - Musical Theatre Actress and known for her role as Éponine in Les Misérables West End.
- Baroness Vadera - Chairwoman of Santander UK (March 2015—), British investment banker and former government minister (2007–2009).
- Lynn Gladden - Chemical engineer, Cambridge University
- Frances Kirkham - Senior Circuit Judge, founder member of the UK Association of Women Judges
- Anne Lonsdale Former President of New Hall College, Cambridge
- Jane Priestman - designer

== Curriculum ==
The girls study mathematics, English, two of the optioned Modern Foreign Languages (Spanish, French or Mandarin), Latin, Chemistry, Physics, Biology, Geography, History, Religious Studies, Art, Technology (including Design and Textiles), Computer Science, Drama, Music and Physical Education. Library Education, Health Education, Current Affairs and Careers Guidance courses are also applied.

In Years 10 and 11, the curriculum is built on a firm academic base, choosing IGCSEs where appropriate to ensure stability, rigour and progression to specialist A Levels.

Pupils study the core subjects: Mathematics, English Language, English Literature, Spanish, at least one additional Modern Foreign Language and either Physics, Chemistry and Biology as separate GCSE subjects or a double GCSE in Core and Additional Science. Pupils choose three of the following optional subjects: Art and Design, Classical Civilisation, Drama, French, Geography, History, Information Technology, Latin, Mandarin, Music, Physical Education, Religion, Philosophy and Ethics and Textiles. Careers Advice is provided to the girls and they follow a detailed course in study skills. Specialist lectures cover life skills, personal and professional development, and PSHE.

== Community ==
On Sunday 19 September 2021 a team of Parents, Staff and Students of Northwood College for Girls entered the Moor Park 10K. With well over a hundred entrants from the school the team raised £17,592 for Mount Vernon Cancer Centre. The team was entered as 'Team NWC'. Northwood College for Girls has partaken in the event over successive years raising in excess of £3,000 towards the local cancer centre.

== See also ==
- List of schools in London
