= Heathfield School, Pinner =

Coordinates: 51°34′44″N 0°23′16″W

Heathfield School
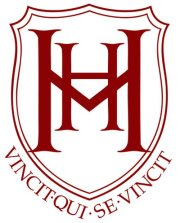

Location
- Beaulieu Drive; Pinner, Middlesex, HA5 1NB; England

Information
- Type: Private day school
- Motto: Latin:Vincit qui se vincit ("She who prevails over herself is twice victorious")
- Established: 1900
- Founder: Miss Edith Gayford
- Closed: Friday 11 July 2014
- Local authority: Harrow
- Headmistress: Mrs Anne Stevens
- Gender: Girls
- Age: 3 to 18
- Enrolment: 500~
- Colours: Burgundy, Navy, Cherry & White
- Former pupils: HOGA:Heathfield Old Girls Association
- Affiliations: GDST, GSA, IAPS
- Brother School: John Lyon (Up to 2006)
- Website: http://www.heathfield.gdst.net/

Heathfield School was a private day school for girls in Pinner in the London Borough of Harrow. It merged with Northwood College in 2014 and the site was taken over by Pinner High School.

== History ==
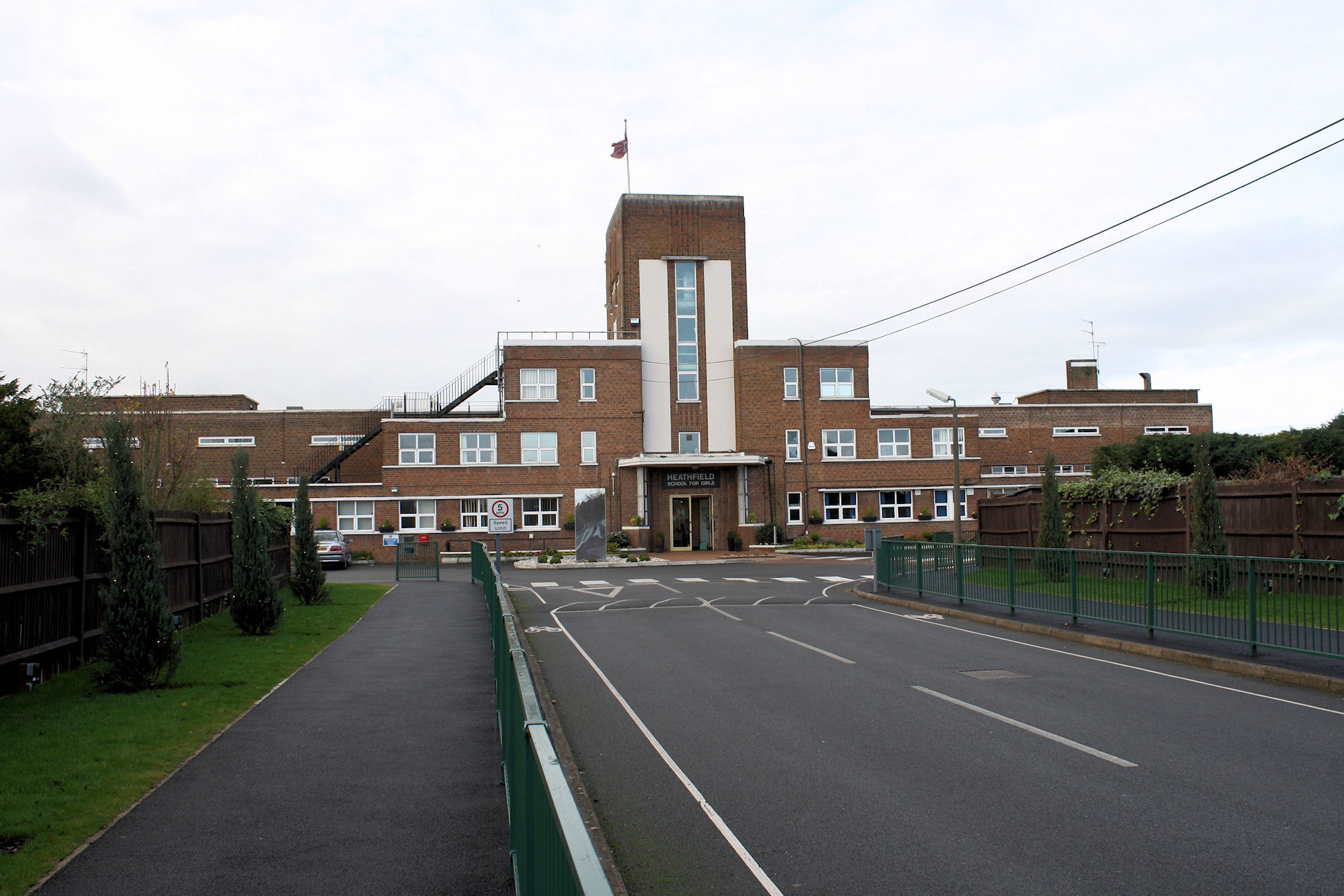
Heathfield School, Pinner

Heathfield was founded by Miss Gayford in 1900 in a house at the foot of Byron Hill in Harrow, with just thirty pupils. A year later it transferred to a large house in College Road. It retained a property at Peterborough Road as the kindergarten - St Kevern, as well as the playing fields across the road. Both moved when the school relocated to Pinner.

In 1921, the school was bought by Miss Norris, who set about a programme of modernisation and enlargement which continued under the supervision of succeeding headships. New buildings and facilities were added at College Road and in 1930, the Sixth Form was added.

=== Pinner ===
When Miss Norris retired, after seeing the school through almost half a century, there was a need to find a new site. In 1982, under the guidance of Mrs Ribchester, Heathfield moved to the former Pinner County Grammar School nine-acre site with a purpose-built school building in Beaulieu Drive, Pinner (where the likes of Elton John and Simon Le Bon had roamed the hallways during their school years). The building itself is of historic Metro-land architectural interest, for its combination of art deco symmetry combined with Tudorbethan mixture of Elizabethan, Tudor and Jacobean elements.

Five years later, the school was taken into the Girls' Day School Trust, under the patronage of Princess Alice, Duchess of Gloucester. A junior wing and nursery were added in 1990.

In the year 2000, under the headship of Miss Juett, a new indoor swimming pool, sports hall, fitness studio and senior library were opened. A new drama and dance studio was built in 2004, followed by a new junior playground, and a new sixth form centre (the Pinner Leadership Centre), added in 2008. Work was later completed on a new building for music, ICT, careers and physics. A new dining room and kitchen were built and existing areas for art, maths, textiles and design technology were refurbished.

Heathfield school was rated "excellent" in nearly all aspects during the 2010 ISI inspection.

Heathfield enjoyed a strong rivalry in both academic and non-academic areas against North London Collegiate School (generally recognised as the first girls' school in the United Kingdom to offer girls the same educational opportunities as boys)), until the merger with Northwood College in 2014 (whose rival is St. Helen's School).

Up to 2006, Heathfield maintained strong links with the John Lyon School (founded in 1876 by the Governors of Harrow School for the education of local boys, in belated keeping with the wishes of John Lyon, Harrow School's founder. The John Lyon School still maintains its historic ties with Harrow School). However, very little interaction took place between the two institutions other than co-hosting a Sixth Form Prom and an invitation to participate in the annual theatre production, which suited the more dramatic students. Subsequently, John Lyon School made links with Northwood College with a programme designed to enable boys and girls to interact. Such events include joint quizzes, debates, book discussions, cookery workshops, theatre trips, gallery visits, careers evenings, newsletter and inter-school competitions.

In 2018 the school hall was the set location of the Forbes 30 Under 30 Social Media sensation's inspirational videos by Jay Shetty, featuring pupils from the first state Hindu faith secondary school in the United Kingdom, Avanti House School. They were hosted on the current Pinner High site while its permanent building on the Whitchurch playing fields was constructed.

=== Headmistresses ===
- Carrie Sage [Harrow Day and Boarding School for Girls] (unknown–1900)
- Edith Gayford (1900–1921)
- Marian Norris (1921–1964)
- Miss J.H.S. Johnson (1964–1974)
- Wyn E Ribchester (1974–1988)
- Jean Merritt (1988–1996)
- Christine Juett (1997–2010)
- Susan Whitfield (2010–2011)
- Anne Stevenson (2011–2014)

=== Northwood merger ===
On 9 September 2013, it was announced that Heathfield GDST would merge with Northwood College. As a result of the merger the Beaulieu Drive site closed, and Heathfield school ceased to exist after nearly 113 years. In September 2014 all girls moved to the newly merged school in Northwood, renamed Northwood College for Girls GDST.

== Curriculum ==
EYFS Learning Journeys - A Teachers Perspective at Heathfield GDST

GCSE, AS, A-levels and Open University extension programme were offered at Heathfield. There were 21 GCSE and 24 AS/A-level subjects to choose from. Most sixth formers selected 4 subjects at AS-level, 3 at A-level. Out of the sixth form 40% would take science A-levels; 30% would take arts/humanities and 30% would take both.

There were special provisions set up to help pupils and some of the teachers even offer extra tuition.

There were a variety of languages offered at GCSE, AS and A-level such as Chinese, French, German, Latin and Spanish. There were regular French, Spanish, Chinese and German trips. There were also French and Spanish nationals in school as assistants.

ICT was taught both as a discrete subject and across the curriculum. There were 187 computers for pupil use, all networked and with email, internet and portal access. In 2008 sixth-form pupils had school laptops for home and school use. In 2013, iPod Touch devices were given to students with relevant apps uploaded in order to incorporate technology in class, in the name of e-learning.

== Houses ==
In the 1960's there were three Houses at Heathfield School, College Road. Their names were Heath, Field and Gayford. The Gayford was added in respect of Headmistress Miss Edith Gayford who increased the numbers of girls. Heath(blue), Field (red) and Gayford (yellow). There were four houses at Heathfield School. From Lower Kindergarten (nursery) through to the Sixth Form, each girl belonged to one of four houses: Brontë, Curie, Nightingale or Pankhurst. This encouraged social contact between the age groups and formed the basis for competitive sports events and inter-house competitions in Music, Dance and Drama, Swimming, Netball, Lacrosse, Rounders, Athletics (Sports Day held at Harrow School) and Public Speaking. House meetings and house assemblies were also held periodically. House Points were awarded by teachers in the form of Commendations which were signed by the Headmistress and returned to the pupils at registration.

The houses represented women, whose stories were repeated to the girls every year, serving as role models to students. Moreover, as a GDST school, female empowerment was integral to the fabric of the school, with the majority of assemblies and the curriculum tailored around women growing up in a stable environment with an understanding the significance of the sacrifices by the Suffrage Movement, achievements by women, and how to enhance their prospects in order to break the glass ceiling.

House	Named after	Colour
Curie	Marie Curie	Yellow
Brontë	The Brontë Sisters	Red
Nightingale	Florence Nightingale	Dark Blue
Pankhurst	Emmeline Pankhurst	Green

== Extracurricular activities ==
There were many opportunities to be involved in interest clubs and non-academic pursuits. Girls have taken part in competitions such as the International Science Olympiads and national public speaking competitions. Other activities which were available include the World Challenge Expeditions, Duke of Edinburgh Award, Super Camp and charity drives.

There were also a variety of school teams and clubs, such as tennis, rounders, netball, lacrosse, swimming, cricket, athletics, football, badminton, available. Other activities include computer, social service volunteers, public-speaking, speech and drama, chess, Young Enterprise, art and craft, ballet, first aid and debating.

Up to 25% of pupils learnt a musical instrument and instrumental exams could be taken in school. Musical groups included a choir, an orchestra, a string group and a recorder group. Each year, Heathfield would put on a school production of either a famous musical or play, students of all ages were encouraged to get involved. There were also dance and drama clubs run by members of the 6th form for younger girls.

== Notable former pupils ==
- Suella Braverman, politician and former Home Secretary
- Lynn Gladden, Shell Professor of Chemical Engineering at the University of Cambridge
- Frances Kirkham, senior circuit judge, founder member of the UK Association of Women Judges
- Anne Lonsdale, former President of New Hall College, Cambridge
- Tracy-Ann Oberman, actress, playwright and narrator
- Katie Waissel, singer-songwriter, former X Factor contestant, Celebrity Big Brother 18 contestant
