= Jockey Club =

British horse racing organisation

The Jockey Club
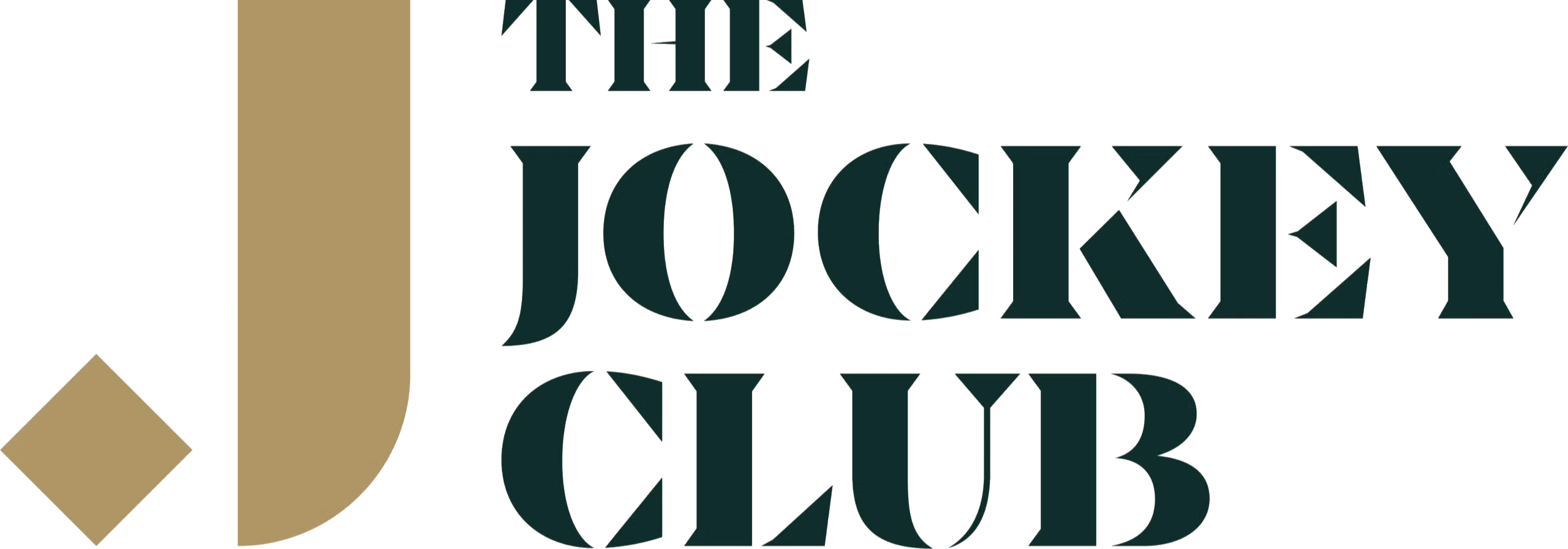

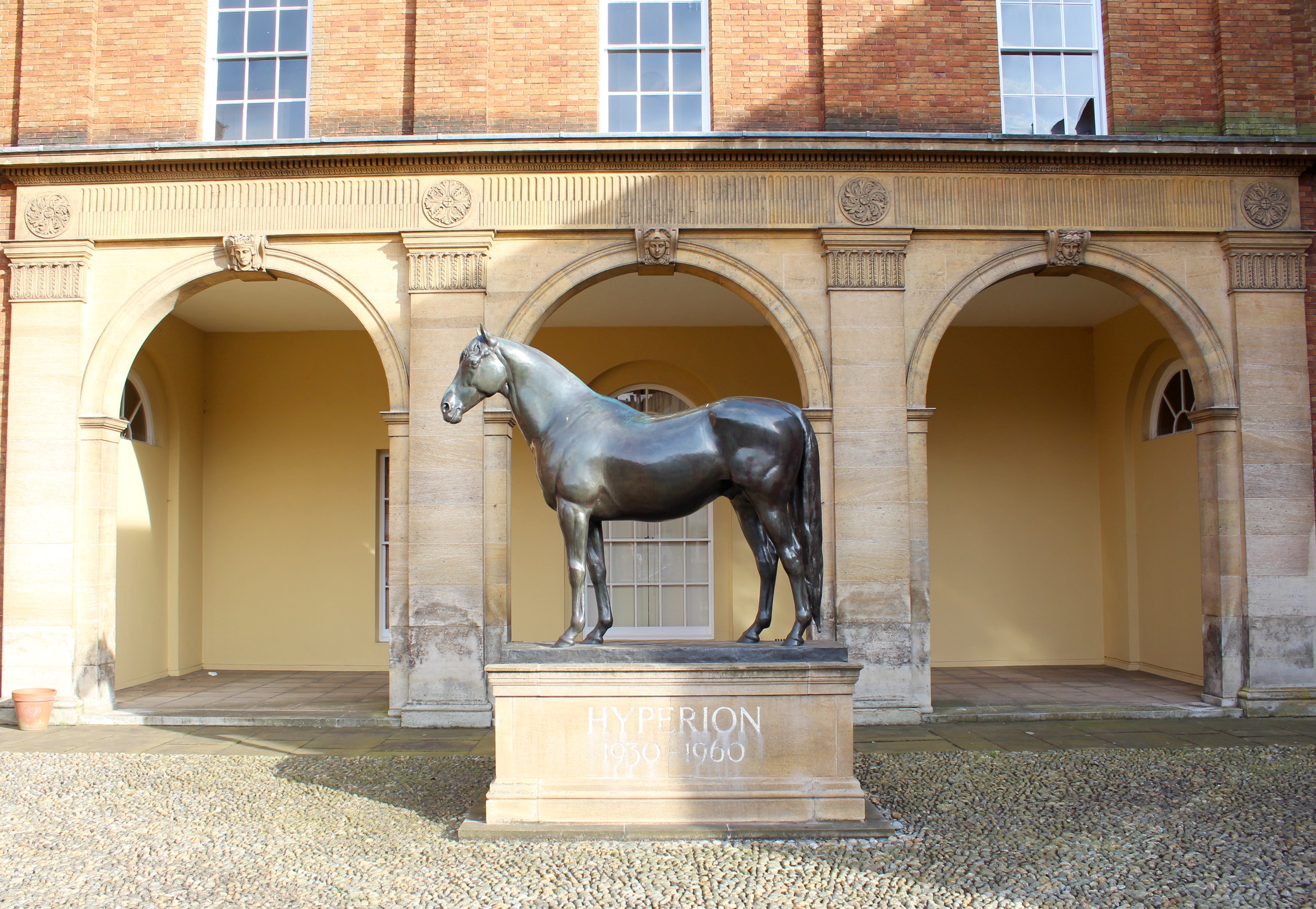
- The Jockey Club Rooms in Newmarket, UK
- Type: Private (incorporated by Royal Charter)
- Industry: Horse racing, leisure
- Founded: Uncertain
- Headquarters: High Holborn; London, WC1
- Area served: United Kingdom
- Key people: Dido Harding (Senior Steward); Jim Mullen (CEO)
- Revenue: £216.5 million (2019)
- Number of employees: c. 600 (FTE)
- Divisions: Jockey Club Racecourses, Jockey Club Estates, The National Stud, Racing Welfare, Jockey Club Catering, Jockey Club Live, Jockey Club Services
- Website: thejockeyclub.co.uk

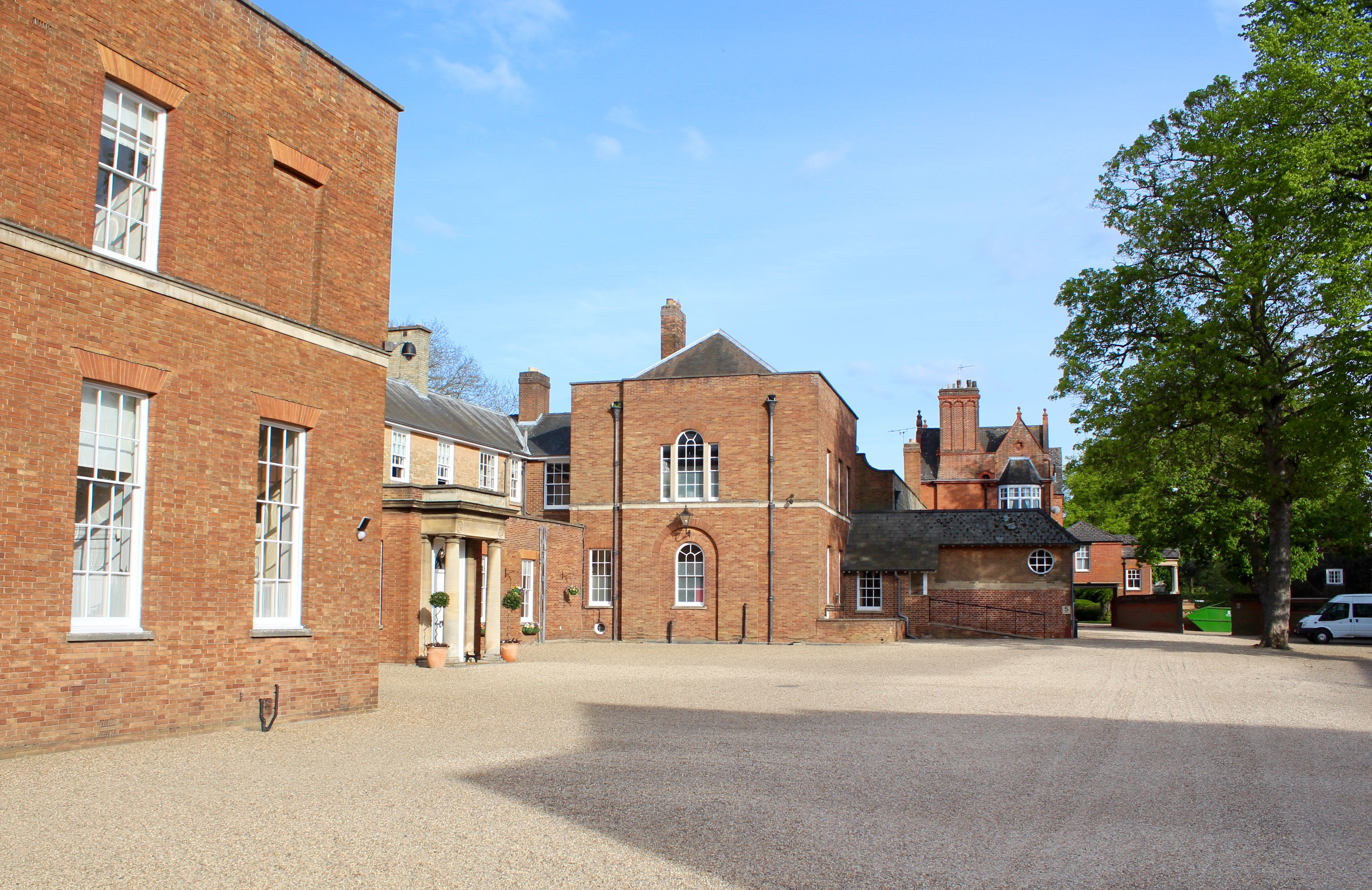
A view of the Jockey Club Rooms in Newmarket, UK.

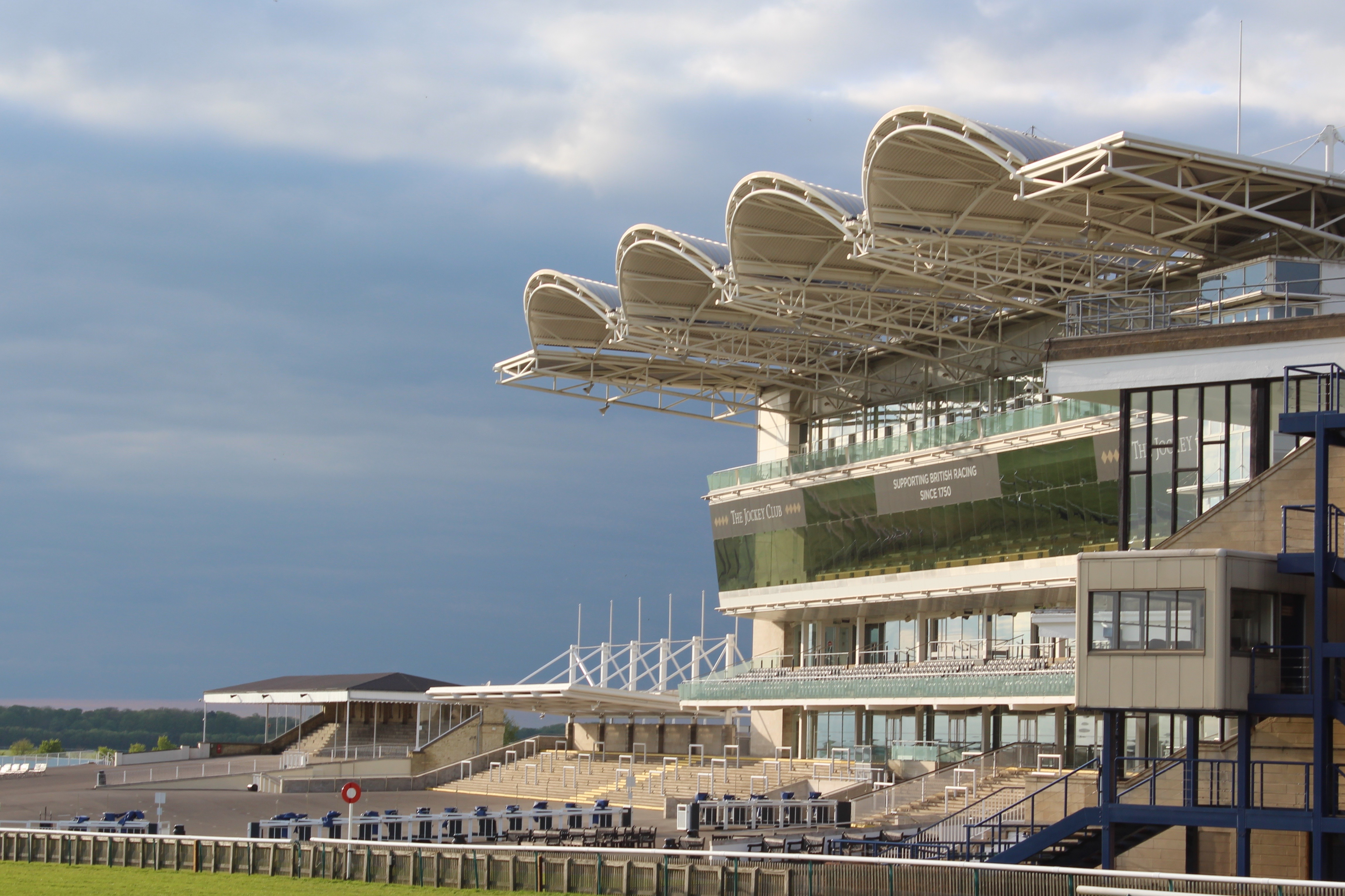
The Rowley Mile Racecourse, Newmarket, UK

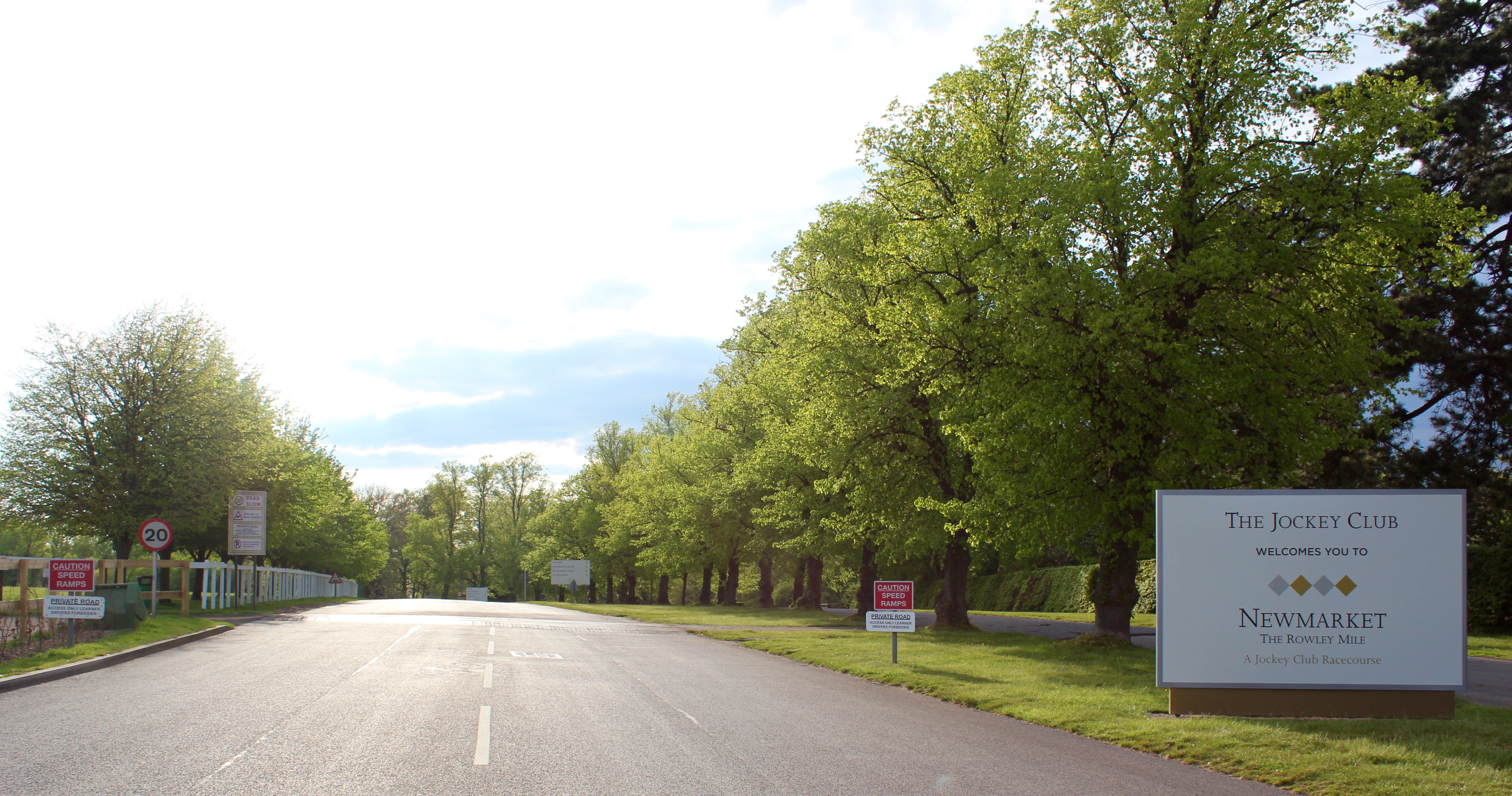
The Rowley Mile entrance, Newmarket, UK

The Jockey Club is one of the largest commercial horse racing organisations in the United Kingdom. It owns 15 of Britain's famous racecourses, including Aintree, Cheltenham, Epsom Downs and both the Rowley Mile and July Course in Newmarket, amongst other horse racing assets such as the National Stud, and the property and land management company, Jockey Club Estates. The registered charity Racing Welfare is also a company limited by guarantee with the Jockey Club being the sole member. As it is governed by Royal Charter, all profits it makes are reinvested back into the sport.

Formerly the regulator for the sport ("Newmarket Rules"), the Jockey Club's responsibilities were transferred to the Horseracing Regulatory Authority (now the British Horseracing Authority) in 2006.

== History ==
The Jockey Club has long been thought to have been founded in 1750 – a year recognised by the club itself in its own records. Some claim it was created earlier, in the 1720s, while others suggest it may have existed in the first decade of the century. A notice of 1729 records that "The Jockey Club, consisting of several Noblemen and Gentlemen, are to meet one Day next Week at Hackwood, the Duke of Bolton's Seat in Hampshire, to consider of the Methods for the better keeping of their respective Strings of Horses at New Market."

It was founded as one of the most exclusive high society social clubs in the United Kingdom, sharing some of the functions of a gentleman's club such as high-level socialising. It was called 'The Jockey Club' in reference to the late medieval word for 'horsemen', pronounced 'yachey', and spelt 'Eachaidhe' in Gaelic. The club's first meetings were held at the "Star and Garter" tavern in Pall Mall, London, before later moving to Newmarket; a town known in the United Kingdom as "The Home of Racing". It was historically the dominant organisation in British horseracing, and it remained responsible for its day-to-day regulation until April 2006.

It passed its first resolution in 1758, that all riders must weigh in after a race.

In the late 19th and early 20th centuries, The Jockey Club had a clubhouse in Pall Mall, where many other gentlemen's clubs were based. The fact that it acquired a governing role in the sport reflected the dominant role of the aristocracy in British horse racing up to the 20th century, and the removal of this role was in part a conscious effect to move the sport away from its patrician image. This can be compared with the way that cricket's Marylebone Cricket Club became the governing body of cricket by default, but later surrendered most of its powers to more representative bodies.

The Jockey Club refused to grant training licences to women trainers until Florence Nagle, supported by the Fawcett Society, sought legal redress. Initially she was unsuccessful until her fight finally reached the Court of Appeal in 1966. The Jockey Club used its considerable influence within the Establishment to twice block her appeal but her third appeal was successful, with the verdict of the three presiding law lords, Lord Denning, Lord Justice Dankwerts and Lord Salmon, being that "If she is to carry on her trade without stooping to subterfuge she has to have a training licence." Of the Jockey Club itself, the Law Lords pronounced that "The rights of a person to work should not be prevented by the dictatorial powers of a body which holds a monopoly." Faced with the court's ruling, the Jockey Club was forced to capitulate, and on 3 August 1966, Nagle and Norah Wilmot became the first women in Britain to receive licences to train racehorses. On the same day, one of Wilmot's horses won at Brighton Racecourse, making her the first official woman trainer of a winning horse.

Jockey Club rules began permitting women jockeys in 1972.

In August 2026, the Jockey Club announced that it would leave the Racecourse Association by the end of the year, following a similar decision by Ascot Racecourse. The move reflected disagreements over the association's governance and proposed reforms to the fixture list.

== The new system ==
Before 2006, it was one of the three bodies which provided management for horse racing in the United Kingdom in conjunction with the British Horseracing Board (itself an offshoot of The Jockey Club) and the Horserace Betting Levy Board.

These regulatory responsibilities were transferred to a new Horseracing Regulatory Authority (HRA) from 3 April 2006. This major re-organisation did not arise from a fundamental failure of the existing arrangements, but an understanding that the old system might not meet modern conditions. The HRA itself ceased to exist on 31 July 2007 as its regulatory duties were merged with the governing responsibility of the British Horseracing Board to create the new British Horseracing Authority.

In February 2023, the organisation dropped the formal dress code at all its 15 racecourses and 342 fixtures, except for the Queen Elizabeth II Stand at Epsom on Derby Day. The change was implemented as a way to make horse racing events more "accessible and inclusive".

== Governance ==
The Jockey Club is run by executives who report to the Board of Stewards (directors). The chairman of the board is called the Senior Steward. As of April 2024, there were nine Stewards, including the Senior Steward and Deputy Senior Steward. Individuals may be elected as Members, who "are in effect 'trustees'. However, they may not profit from their role, as all profits are invested into British racing." As of December 2017, there were 163 Members, including 24 Honorary Members.

== Property ==
- Jockey Club Racecourses: operates 15 racecourses in Great Britain, which host a quarter of the racing calendar. This includes four of the five 'Classics' of Flat racing: The Oaks and The Derby at Epsom Downs and the 2,000 Guineas and the 1,000 Guineas at Newmarket's Rowley Mile course, and major National Hunt meetings include the Cheltenham Festival and the Grand National at Aintree
- Jockey Club Estates: property and land management company, which operates in excess of 3,000 acres of training facilities in Newmarket, Lambourn and Epsom
- The National Stud: a breeding and bloodstock training operation transferred to the Jockey Club in 2008
- Racing Welfare: a racing charity that aims to help to those working in the Thoroughbred industry
- Racing Calendar, publication

== Racecourse ownership ==
Jockey Club Racecourses was formerly called Racecourse Holdings Trust. The fifteen racecourses owned by Jockey Club Racecourses are:

Large courses:

- Aintree – Merseyside
- Cheltenham – Gloucestershire
- Epsom – Surrey
- Haydock Park – Merseyside
- Kempton Park – Surrey
- Newmarket July Course – Cambridgeshire
- Newmarket Rowley Mile – Suffolk
- Sandown Park – Surrey

Smaller courses:

- Carlisle – Cumbria
- Exeter – Devon
- Huntingdon – Cambridgeshire
- Market Rasen – Lincolnshire
- Nottingham – Nottinghamshire
- Warwick – Warwick
- Wincanton – Somerset
