= Florence Nagle =

Breeder and trainer of race horses

Florence Nagle c. 1960 (Note: Photo taken around the time she was pursuing action against the Jockey Club; the diamond brooch was described by the author of her biography as "one of her [Nagle] favourite pieces of jewellery".)

Florence Nagle (26 October 1894 – 30 October 1988) was a British trainer and breeder of racehorses, a breeder of pedigree dogs, and an active feminist. Nagle purchased her first Irish Wolfhound in 1913, and went on to own or breed twenty-one United Kingdom Champions. Best in Show at Crufts in 1960 was awarded to Sulhamstead Merman, who was bred, owned and exhibited by Nagle. She also competed successfully in field trials with Irish Setters, from the 1920s until the mid-1960s resulting in eighteen Field Trial Champions. The male dog who was a linchpin in the 1970s revival of the Irish Red and White Setter breed was descended from one of Nagle's Irish Setters.

Described as "the Mrs. Pankhurst of British horse racing", Nagle trained her first racehorse in 1920, the Irish-bred colt Fernley. At that time women were forced to employ men to hold a Jockey Club trainers licence on their behalf, or to have licences in their husbands' names. Nagle worked towards reforms to redress this. She successfully challenged the well-established leading gentlemen's clubs of the racing and canine worlds over their gender inequality, and in 1966 became one of the first two women in the United Kingdom licensed to train racehorses. The first racehorse officially trained in Nagle's name was Mahwa, registered as being owned by her friend Miss Newton Deakin, with whom she jointly owned some of her dogs.

Dissatisfied with the lack of opportunities for women jockeys, Nagle sponsored the Florence Nagle Girl Apprentices' Handicap first run in 1986 at Kempton Park. She died at her home in West Chiltington, Sussex, two years later at the age of 94, leaving funds in her will for the continuation of the race.

== Background and early life ==
Born in Fallowfield, Manchester, Nagle was the daughter of Sir William George Watson, 1st Baronet of Sulhamstead (1861–1930) and his second wife Bessie (née Atkinson); she was also the elder sister of art connoisseur Peter Watson. Nagle was educated at Wycombe Abbey before studying domestic economy at Evendine Court, from which she was expelled after visiting Worcester Cathedral without permission. Accompanied by the daughter of a canon, Nagle had hired a car for the excursion – she was one of the first women in Berkshire to hold a driving licence, gaining it when she was fifteen years old. Her education was completed at a finishing school after which she spent some time in Paris, where she became friends with Megan Lloyd George.

Sulhamstead Abbots, Nagle's family home in Berkshire, was used as a hospital during the First World War. There she met James Nagle, a native of Ireland who had emigrated to Canada but returned to serve with the King's Royal Rifle Corps and then had been sent to Sulhamstead Abbots to recuperate. Against her parents' wishes the couple were married on 1 July 1916, resulting in them threatening to disinherit her. The early days of Nagle's marriage were hard; she was used to a wealthy lifestyle – her family money came from her father's successful business, Maypole Dairies – but her parents offered the couple no financial assistance. Nagle always worked hard and subsidised their income by making cream teas, cleaning windows and scrubbing toilets. The couple had two children, a son, David, and a daughter, Patricia. The marriage was not a success, and her husband ran off with one of the kennel maids. Obtaining a divorce was not easy in the 1920s; when asked in court for the reason James left, Nagle answered "He must have got bored with me." The divorce took place in 1928, five years before her husband's death. At the time of the divorce she was living on a smallholding near Headley, but returned to Sulhamstead in 1932 after inheriting land and money from Sir William. Ten years later, in 1942, she purchased Westerlands, a farm in Petworth, so she could personally oversee the stables.

Working in Folkestone during the Second World War, Nagle managed a canteen for the ARP. She also donated the full cost of £5,000 to purchase a Spitfire named Sulhamstead for the Royal Air Force.

== Dog breeding ==
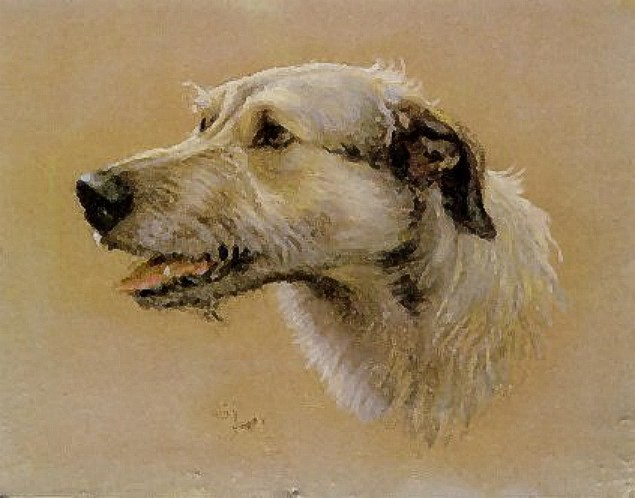
Sir Michael of Sheppey, Nagle's first Irish Wolfhound, painting by Aldin

As a child, Nagle had a Pomeranian and a Bulldog, but was promised she could have a larger dog once her schooling was completed. In 1913 her dream came to fruition with the purchase of her first Irish Wolfhound, Manin Michael, for £5. James Nagle subsequently registered the dog with the Kennel Club, before it was transferred to the ownership of Mr and Mrs Nagle, and its name changed to Sir Michael of Sheppey in May 1917. Food shortages during the First World War resulted in an official prohibition on dog breeding, but Nagle ignored it and bred her first litter from a bitch called Lady Alma of Sheppey. (Note: Nagle's dog were originally registered with the affix Sheppey.)

During her marriage, while residing in Concara, Sulhamstead, near Reading, she began breeding dogs and served as a judge of Irish Wolfhounds and Setters; Great Danes and Deerhounds were other breeds she judged at championship show level. Her dogs were exhibited at shows by her husband, who was also a judge of Wolfhounds, and they were entered in his name until the couple divorced.

A bitch puppy, the runt of the litter, was purchased for £48 in 1923 and she became Nagle's first dog to gain the title of Champion. Named Sulhamstead Thelma, she was declared the best Irish Wolfhound bitch and awarded the Challenge Certificate at three consecutive Crufts, in 1925, 1926 and 1927. (Note: A hound has to win three Challenge Certificates from three different judges (one must be won after the dog is a year old) to be a Champion. A Challenge Certificate is awarded to the best male and the best female in breeds at championship shows where the Kennel Club has allowed an allocation of CCs for that breed.) Her next Champion was Sulhamstead Conncara, a male dog, born in 1925. Conncara was blind, possibly owing to an accident as a young puppy, but Nagle kept that secret until three years after his death, believing that his qualities would have been overlooked by other breeders if they had known. According to Nagle's biographer, Ferelith Somerfield, (Note: Ferelith Somerfield is an international dog judge, breeder and wife of Stafford Somerfield.) this dog was "one of the great sires of all time in the breed" and an "outstanding show dog". (Note: The Kennel Club introduced a rule prohibiting the showing of blind dogs when they discovered one had been exhibited by Nagle.) A prepotent sire, (Note: A prepotent sire is a stud dog that passes on certain of his traits to an especially large number of his offspring so that they resemble each other more closely than usual.) he produced several Champions and other top-class show specimens.

Nagle owned or bred forty-five Wolfhounds who were awarded Challenge Certificates, twenty-one of them Champions. She believed dogs should be capable of carrying out the work the breed was developed to do, and she promoted coursing.

Irish Wolfhounds bred by Nagle were also successful in America; she began exporting dogs there in 1933. Best of breed awards at the Irish Wolfhound Club of America speciality shows were secured by Champion Sulhamstead Matador of Killybracken in 1960 and by Sulhamstead Mars of Riverlawn in 1963. She also judged the national speciality there twice and judged Irish Setters and Irish Wolfhounds at the Westminster in 1937. Other countries she exported Wolfhounds to included Sweden, Italy and Uruguay. As late as 1960, Sulhamstead Merman, a 150-pound Irish Wolfhound bred, owned and shown by Nagle at "London's big dog show", Crufts, won the Hound Group and went on to be declared Best in Show or "supreme champion"; the judges were H. S. Lloyd and Fred Cross. She judged the breed twice at Crufts: in 1961, the only time in a nine-year period her dogs were not best of breed there; and in 1970.

Nagle acquired her first Irish Setter, whom she named Sulhamstead D'Or, in 1924 to keep a wolfhound puppy company. In April 1930 she entered him into the All-Aged Stakes at the Kennel Club field trials. In August 1932 she entered a dog named Sulhamstead Token D'Or into the Scottish Field Trials in the same category. At the Kennel Club field trials of April 1933, Nagle entered Sulhamstead Bob D'Or into the All-Aged Stakes and the judge awarded her the prize presented by the Irish Setter Association of England. In September 1934, she entered her Irish Setter Sulhamstead Snip D'Or into the Novice Stake of the Devon and Cornwall Pointer and Setter Society's 12th working trials at Pynes, near Exeter.

In July 1935 Nagle entered the field trials of the Irish Setter Association near Ruabon in North Wales, competing in the Open Stake for Irish Setters and the Puppy Stake for Irish Setters, for puppies which were born the previous year. At the 35th International Gun Dog League trials held at Douglas Castle in August 1935, she was awarded a diploma in the Champion Stakes for Pointers and Setters. The following month, Nagle took the silver perpetual challenge trophy in the Open Stake of the field trials of the Devon and Cornwall Pointer and Setter Society at Newlyn, near Newquay, competing with her Irish Setter Sulhamstead Baffle D'Or. At the Kennel Club field trials for pointers and setters in April 1936, she entered Sulhamstead Bluff D'Or into the All-Aged Stake and was awarded the Penheale Challenge Cup by Captain N. R. Colville for the "best constitutioned dog or bitch, displaying the greatest game-finding ability". At the 18th annual Scottish Field Trial Association's field trials for pointers and setters at Yester estate in Gifford, East Lothian, Scotland in August 1936, Nagle won first prize in the Brace Stake with Sulhamstead Bluff D'Or. The Kennel Club own a pastel painting by Cecil Aldin of two of Nagle's Irish Setters, the Field Trial Champions Sulhamstead Sheilin D'Or and Sulhamstead Valla D'Or. Field trials saw a general downturn in popularity of Irish Setters competing in the 1930s; during the following decade the breed was principally represented by Nagle's dogs. Nagle had eighteen Irish Setter field trial champions during the period she was active in the breed from the 1920s to the mid-1960s. The male dog Harlequin of Knockalla was pivotal in the revival of the Irish Red and White Setter breed in the 1970s; he was a descendant of Nagle's Irish Setter Sulhamstead Natty D'Or, so the Sulhamstead bloodline is behind most modern day red and whites. Nagle withdrew from the field-trial scene in the mid-1960s following the retirement of her handler, George Abbott.

Other breeds she owned included Golden Retrievers and Pointers. Nagle's activities were not confined to dogs and horses. A Berkshire boar named Pamber Ugly Duckling was champion at the Royal Show in 1921. Later he was exported to Argentina, after the purchaser paid what at the time was a record price of £750. During the 1930s she owned Prince Everett of Auchterarder, a prize-winning Aberdeen Angus.

== Racehorse training and breeding ==
Sandsprite, owned and unofficially trained by Nagle, achieved second place in the 1937 Epsom Derby.

According to the Encyclopedia of British Horseracing, Nagle trained her first racehorse in 1920, the Irish-bred colt Fernley. Her fascination with the sport stemmed from a much earlier time pre-dating her decision to concentrate on breeding dogs but it was particularly the breeding aspect of racehorses she was drawn to. Nagle owned the winner of the Newport Nursery Handicap in 1932, a horse named Solano, and a reporter recorded that "While Solano is not Mrs Nagle's first winner, it is some years since the 'rifle green, red cross-belts' caught the judge's eye". On 5 July 1935, she entered her racehorse Comanche at Newmarket.

Nagle entered The Derby in 1937; that horse, Sandsprite, ridden by John Crouch at odds of 100–1, finished second to Mid-day Sun, owned by Mrs Lettice Miller, the first woman owner ever to win the Derby. This was the first horse Nagle bred herself and reactions from commentators were mixed. One report described the horse as a "commanding individual", whereas another reporter's opposing opinion was revealed by Nagle when after Sandsprite's success at Epsom she stated "Not bad for a horse which one newspaper said was only good enough to give rides at the seaside". Sandsprite's dam was Wood Nymph, a mare purchased by Nagle for 240 guineas. She wanted to have her mated by the stallion Sansovino but had to settle for using his son, Sandwich, as she could not afford his stud fee. Sandsprite had several other outings in which he gained second or third placings, but was put down at the onset of his stud career after breaking a leg.

One of Nagle's early equine purchases was 15-year-old Rose of England, the winner of the 1930 Oaks, for 3,500 guineas. The mare had already produced the 1937 St. Leger winner, Chulmleigh, and the 1939 top winning two-year-old, British Empire. In Nagle's ownership she foaled Westerlands Rose, by the stallion Colombo who produced several winners. These included Westerlands Chalice, by Chamossaire, who won three races in 1957; and Game Rose, by Big Game, another winner during the 1950s. Other winning progeny from Westerlands Rose were Westerlands Champagne, Westerlands Prince and Westerlands Rosebud. These five horses accounted for ten race wins between them.

At the December Newmarket sales in 1944 Nagle bought the two-year-old Carpatica, by the Epsom Derby winner, Hyperion out of Campanula, the 1,000 Guineas Stakes winner, for a record 15,000 guineas with the intention of looking after the filly's training at her stables in Petworth. She also bought a five-year-old mare in foal, Hay Harvest, for 5,500 guineas. When bred to Sayajirao, Carpatica produced the 1950s winner, Cavina.

One of the main winners in the Nagle stables in the early 1960s was Gelert, trained by Nagle and owned by Miss Newton Deakin. Sired by Owen Tudor out of Westerlands Rosebud, he won a race at Ascot. His dam had been successfully raced in the early 1950s and then proved herself as a useful brood.

In the first half of the 20th century women trainers were not unknown – Norah Wilmot was training horses for The Queen. But women trained in an unofficial capacity, and were forced to employ men to hold the training licence on their behalf, or to have licences in their husbands' names. Thus, beginning in 1932, the divorced Nagle employed Alfred Stickley, a licensed trainer, to work at her stables in the capacity of head lad. Mahwa, by Match III out of Media, was owned by Newton Deakin and was the first winning horse to be officially listed as trained by Nagle. (Note: Nagle and Newton Deakin also jointly owned some of the gundogs.) As late as 1975, she trained twelve horses and recommended feeding them some seaweed to provide iodine. She was also a great believer in the beneficial effects of fresh air, insisting that her horses' top stable doors were permanently left open. She was vehemently opposed to the vaccination of horses against equine influenza, and challenged a Jockey Club decision to make vaccination compulsory. She thought the hardest part of animal breeding was "to breed for 'guts'. You can produce lovely looking animals that go well – till they are on a race course with a stiff race to win."

== Activism ==
For twenty years Nagle worked to end the Jockey Club's ban on licensing women as race horse trainers, which she saw as an injustice: eventually, frustrated by the Jockey Club's persistent refusal to grant training licences to women, Nagle sought legal redress. It has been suggested that the club used its considerable influence within the Establishment to have her claim blocked twice. Her fight finally reached the Court of Appeal in 1966. Following her third appearance in court, Nagle emerged victorious. The verdict of the three presiding judges, Lord Denning, Lord Justice Dankwerts and Lord Justice Salmon, was, in the words of Lord Denning, that "If she is to carry on her trade without stooping to subterfuge she has to have a licence." Lord Denning went on to describe the refusal to grant Nagle a training licence as "arbitrary and capricious", and Lord Justice Danckwerts called it "restrictive and nonsensical". Of the Jockey Club itself, Lord Justice Danckwerts went on to pronounce that "The courts have the right to protect the right of a person to work when it is being prevented by the dictatorial powers of a body which holds a monopoly." All three judges also referred to the Sex Disqualification (Removal) Act 1919. Faced with the court's damning and embarrassing decision, the Jockey Club capitulated, and on 3 August 1966 Florence Nagle and Norah Wilmot became the first women in Britain to receive licences to train racehorses. On the same day, one of Wilmot's horses won at Brighton Racecourse, making her the first official woman trainer of a winning horse.

Nagle credited herself with "dragging the Jockey Club into the twentieth century". She said: "This was a matter of principle. I am a feminist. I believe in equal rights for women. Things should be decided by ability, not sex". At odds with Nagle's view, in her court case Lord Justice Salmon commented that "No doubt there are occupations, such as boxing, which may be reasonably regarded inherently unsuitable for women", and Lord Denning had gone on to say that "It is not as if the training of horses could be regarded as an unsuitable occupation for a woman, like that of a jockey or speedway-rider"; it was another six years before Jockey Club rules permitted women jockeys in 1972. When asked by a journalist in the late 1970s if she thought women could ever match men on the racecourse, Nagle replied: "My dear man, it used to be said women couldn't stand up to three-day-eventing. Now they're beating the men regularly – and the same will happen in racing. Give them time." Her endeavours led to her being described as "the Mrs Pankhurst of British horse racing" in Stud & Stable Magazine and "Racing's Emily Pankhurst".

At the age of 83 Nagle was still pursuing gender equality, accusing the Kennel Club of sexual discrimination in their insistence on male-only membership and taking them to court over the matter. After the Sex Discrimination Act 1975 was enacted, Nagle was proposed as a member of the Kennel Club at the end of September 1977; the nomination was refused in January 1978 because the Kennel Club's constitution restricted membership to men only. Nagle referred the matter to an Industrial Tribunal five months later. She was Chairwoman of the Ladies Joint Committee, a group set up in 1975 as a part of the Kennel Club hierarchy, but the committee was not allowed any input into general club decisions. Her actions against the club were fully supported by the other members of the Ladies Committee. Legal technicalities caused the tribunal to reject the case, but it recommended that the Equal Opportunities Commission should be approached as discrimination was clearly demonstrated. Nagle was determined and stated her intention to appeal against the decision. Yet, in contrast to her prior comments about being a feminist, she stated during this battle that she was "not a women's libber".

Leonard Pagliero was Chairman of the Kennel Club at the time, and before Nagle was able to complete the appeal he contacted the canine press, Dog World and Our Dogs, on 8 September 1978 announcing that the Club's General Committee was recommending that the club's constitution be changed to allow women members. The proposal was carried unanimously at a meeting held on 23 November 1978. The result was that Nagle and many other ladies were accepted as members of the Kennel Club at a formal meeting held on 10 April 1979. The total number of women approved for membership at the landmark meeting was 80; the costs of the campaign were funded by Nagle.

== Later life ==
In the 1980s, still dissatisfied with the lack of opportunities for women jockeys, Nagle sponsored a race at Kempton Park, The Florence Nagle Girl Apprentices' Handicap. The first event took place in 1986; Nagle left a bequest in her will to ensure the race's survival. Earlier in that decade, Peter Scott ("Hotspur" of The Daily Telegraph) had claimed that she was dead when saying that "she must have been smiling down" on Aintree Racecourse when Jenny Pitman's Corbiere won the 1983 Grand National; the following day, he reported that she was indeed still alive and that she had watched the race on television.

Nagle died at her home, Little Mayfield in West Chiltington, Sussex, in 1988 at the age of 94.
