= Norah Wilmot =

British racehorse trainer (1889–1980)

Norah Wilmot, c. 1962

Norah Wilmot (1889–1980) was the first British woman racehorse trainer to officially train a winning horse. Her historic win came with her filly Pat, at Brighton in August 1966, just one day after she became one of the first two women to be granted a training licence by the Jockey Club. She was the eldest daughter of racehorse trainer Sir Robert Wilmot, 6th Baronet (1853–1931) and his second wife Eleanor Georgiana, née Hare.

== Career ==
In 1931 her father's obituary in The Times described Wilmot as deserving of a trainer's licence, being as knowledgeable of horses as any man, and able to ride as well as many jockeys. But the Jockey Club, which governed British racing, disagreed; it forbade women trainers and jockeys regardless of rank, knowledge or experience.

Before 1966 women could only train in an unofficial capacity, and were forced to employ men to hold licences on their behalf or have licences in their husbands' names. In the unmarried Wilmot's case "her" licence was held by her successive head lads: Rickards, Metcalfe, Swash, and finally Bob Greenhill. Although Wilmot had successfully trained racehorses since inheriting Binfield Grove Stud, Bracknell in 1931, had been her father's assistant trainer for twenty years before his death, and counted the Goodwood Cup and the Doncaster Cup, with Haulfryn, in 1937 among her uncredited wins, she was not an officially acknowledged trainer. Since inheriting her father's stable Wilmot had frequently applied to the Jockey Club for a training licence, and each time her request had been summarily declined.

This situation was often unpopular with the racegoing public, especially as Wilmot's patrons included Queen Elizabeth II. On one occasion when Wilmot's multiple 3 yr old winner in 1961, No Fiddling, won at Kempton, Wilmot who trained No Fiddling for one of her greatest supporters, Captain George Drummond, the crowd had chanted her name, and the royal racing manager, Captain Charles Moore, had personally, defying Jockey Club rules, taken Wilmot into the unsaddling enclosure at Kempton to stand beside her winning horse in the manner of a male trainer. Wilmot produced another 3 yr old winner for Capt Drummond with Don't Tell at Folkestone in 1964.

In 1963, Queen Elizabeth II sent her horse, Night Watch, to Wilmot to train, defying the Jockey Club by including "a WOMAN (sic) among her trainers for the coming flat-racing season" according to the Daily Herald. in 1964, Wilmot trained the Queen a winner with the horse Don’t Tell, who won at Folkestone.

== Training licence ==
Wilmot was a contemporary and friend of the feminist and fellow trainer Florence Nagle, who had long campaigned against what she saw as an injustice to her sex in British racing. Eventually, frustrated by the Jockey Club's persistent refusal to grant women a training licence, Nagle sought legal redress; initially unsuccessful, her fight finally reached the Court of Appeal in 1966. Using its considerable influence within the Establishment, the club twice had her appeal blocked. Following her third appeal, Nagle emerged from the court victorious. The verdict of the three presiding law lords, Lord Denning, Lord Justice Dankwerts and Lord Salmon, was, in the words of Lord Denning, that "If she is to carry on her trade without stooping to subterfuge she has to have a training licence." Of the Jockey Club itself, the Law Lords went on to pronounce that "The rights of a person to work should not be prevented by the dictatorial powers of a body which holds a monopoly." Faced with the court's damning and embarrassing decision, the Jockey Club was forced to capitulate, and on 3 August 1966 Nagle and Wilmot became the first women in Britain to receive licences to train racehorses. According to Ferelith Somerfield, wife of Stafford Somerfield and author of Nagle's biography, it was the way the Jockey Club dealt with Wilmot that "proved the catalyst" to the case being undertaken.

On 3 August 1966, one of Norah Wilmot’s horses won at Brighton Racecourse, making her the first official woman trainer of a winning horse.

Besides Halfryn, Wilmot's most notable horses were Halcyon Gift and Squander Bug.

== Later years ==
The last years of Wilmot's life were blighted by crippling arthritis, leaving her unable to personally saddle her horses at race meetings. But horses she had bred, including No Trespass and Pick Me Not, continued to race successfully and bring her credit. Wilmot died on 23 March 1980, never having married.
