= Heathfield School =

Heathfield School may refer to one of several schools in England:

- Heathfield School, Ascot, previously Heathfield St Mary's School
- Heathfield School, Pinner, one of the Girls' Day School Trust schools
- Heathfield Knoll School, Wolverley, near Kidderminster
