= Brighton Racecourse =

Horse racing venue in England

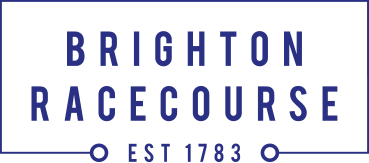

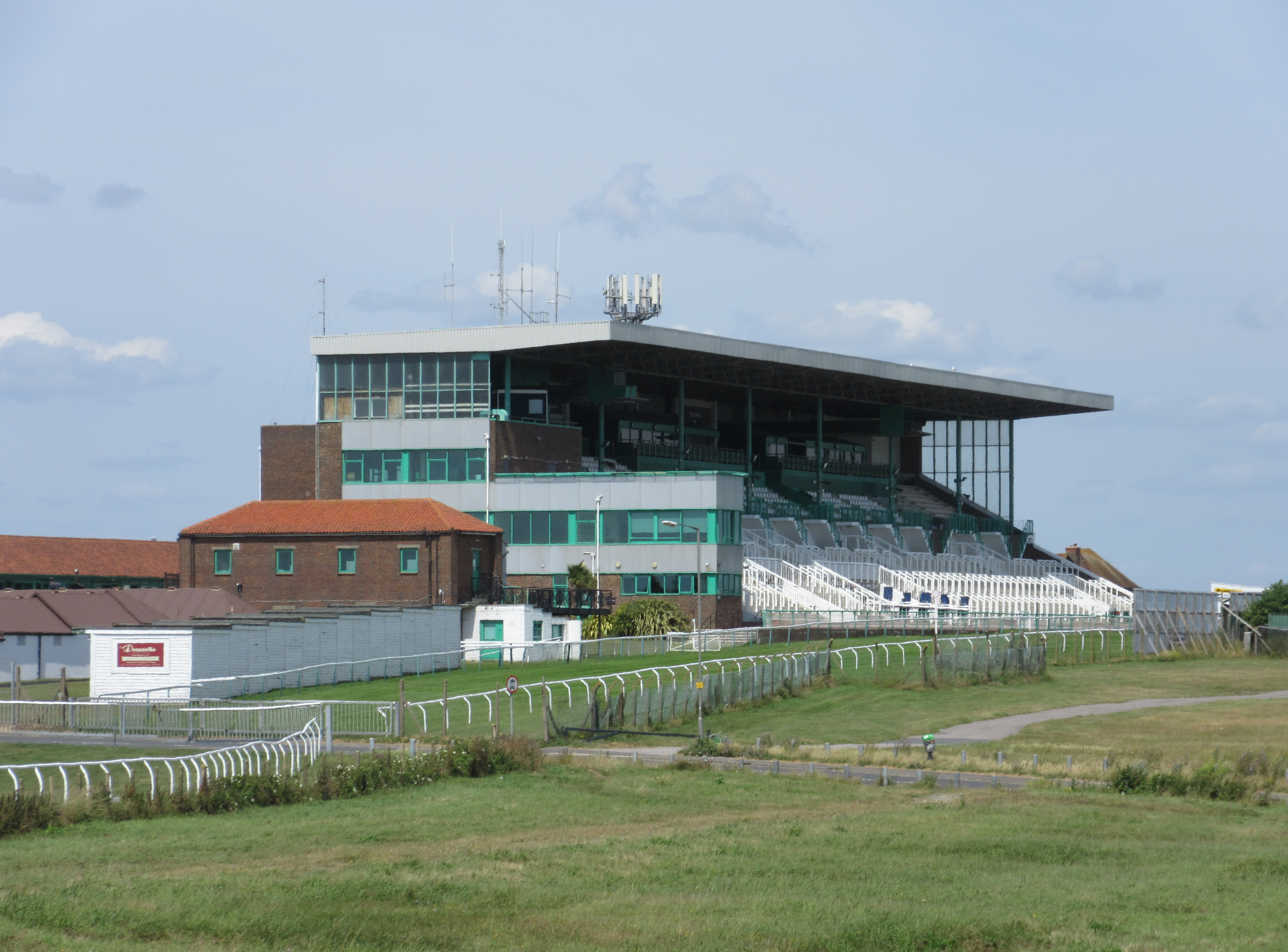
- The main grandstand in 2015
- Interactive map of Brighton Racecourse
- Location: Brighton, East Sussex
- Coordinates: 50°49′49″N 0°06′43″W
- Owned by: Arena Racing Company
- Date opened: 1783
- Screened on: Sky Sports Racing
- Course type: Flat

Brighton Racecourse is an English horse racing venue located a mile to the northeast of the centre of Brighton, Sussex, owned by the Arena Racing Company.

== Location and layout ==
It is situated on Whitehawk Hill, on the edge of the South Downs, about four hundred feet above sea level and a mile from the coast. The geology of the downs is Middle Chalk; therefore the going is nearly always good. The track has the form of a horseshoe one-and-a-half miles in length. This makes it one of the few British courses not to form a complete circuit, like Epsom with which Brighton is sometimes compared. The finishing straight is about four furlongs in length, with a steep descent followed by a slightly-less-steep climb to the winning post. It is a left-handed course, used for flat racing only. The longest race run today is 1 1/2 miles. However, the course used to extend a further half-mile across the golf course towards Roedean. This made four-mile races possible, starting at the winning post and going the reverse way round the track, then looping at the two-mile start and returning the conventional way. Hurdle races were also formerly held at Brighton, with one being situated on the steep downhill.

== History ==
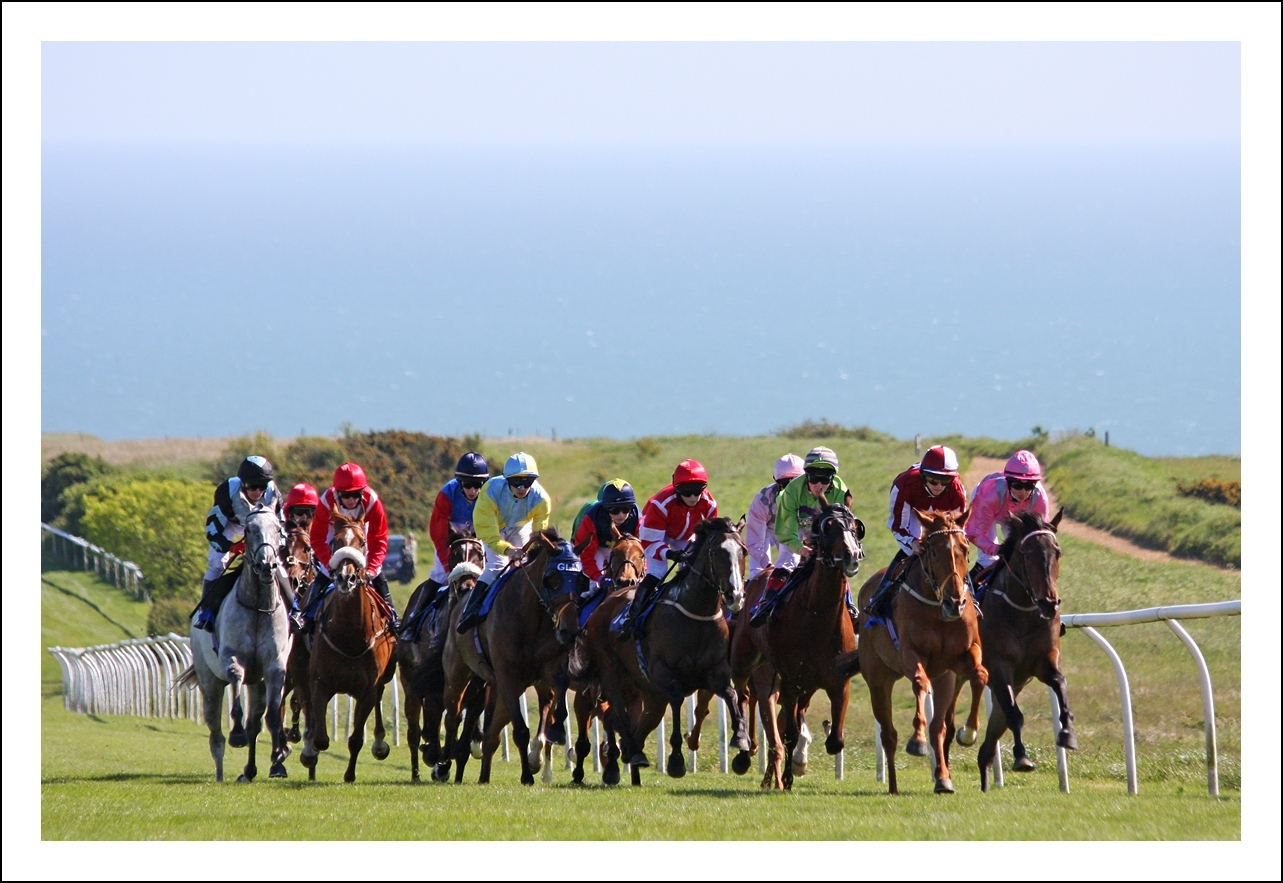
The unique sight of racing across the downs with the sea in the background

The Duke of Cumberland organised the first public racing at the current site in 1783 although racing had been taking place in Brighton since before 1713. Early races were contested by members of the armed forces who were garrisoned in the town. The principal meeting took place in July or August and was timed to fit with the local Whitehawk Fair, which was discontinued by the 1820s.

According to legend, King George IV, when still Prince of Wales, invented hurdle racing at Brighton while out riding with aristocratic friends. They found some sheep pens which they proceeded to jump. A grandstand was erected in 1788, but burnt down on 23 August 1796, a fire blamed on a family of paupers who had been allowed to live in it.

Wigstead and Rowlandson comment in "An Excursion to Brighthelmstone made in the year 1789", "The race-ground is exceedingly well adapted to the purpose for which it is intended and is one of the most beautifully situated spots in the world..."

It was the custom of the Prince of Wales, later George IV, in the early 19th century to make his way up Race Hill in a barouche drawn by six greys.

In 1805, the races were faced with severe disruption when the farmer who leased the racecourse threatened to plough it up unless he received the complimentary gift of wine he usually received each season. He was in the process of beginning to plough when he was chased off by a press gang and the races allowed to continue.

The course was home for a while to top class racing, and was attended by fashionable society, but it drifted out of fashion when the Prince and his friends ceased to attend in 1816, although the Brighton Stakes was a "race of note" inaugurated in 1824. By 1850, the railway had arrived in Brighton, allowing greater access for Londoners, and the course began to thrive again. A new stand was built, and the Brighton Cup inaugurated. Brighton's main meeting formed part of the "Sussex Fortnight" in summer - where the Glorious Goodwood festival was followed up by big meetings at Brighton and Lewes.

In 1850, admission to the betting ring and stand was four shillings; a ticket for three days was 10s 6d. Racing began at 1.30pm, with seven races at half-hourly intervals.

Crowds rose to over 20,000 in the period following the Second World War. At the time, grandstands existed on both sides of the home straight. In the 1960s, the course held a Derby Trial for six years. No runners went on to win the Derby, but two won the St. Leger. A new stand was built for £400,000 in 1965. Due to a court ruling, the Jockey Club was forced to grant training licences to women, and on 3 August 1966, Florence Nagle and Norah Wilmot became the first women in Britain to receive licences to train racehorses; on the same day, one of Wilmot's horses won at the course, making her the first official woman trainer of a winning horse.

Attendance declined as Brighton's tourist industry did, and the facility became run-down. Racecourse owning group Northern Racing took a majority stake in 1998 and spent £4m refurbishing the course. As of 1999, Northern owned 81% of the course with Brighton & Hove City Council retaining a 19% interest. Northern Racing merged with Arena Racing in 2012 to become the Arena Racing Company.

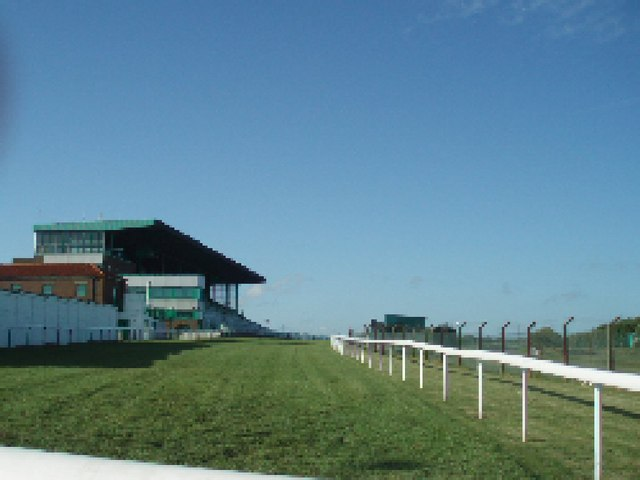

== Major races ==
Today, Brighton is one of the smaller racecourses in Britain in terms of the quality of racing and prize money offered. In 2012/13, its average prize money per meeting was £26,349. Only Southwell, Chepstow and Folkestone (now closed) offered less.

The season's highlight is the three-day Brighton Festival, on the first Wednesday, Thursday and Friday of August. Some 15,000 people attend on each day, and there are enclosures and facilities for all levels of desired race-day experience. The main event is the Brighton Mile Challenge Trophy Handicap, worth £9,450 to the winner in 2021, and sponsored by Wainwright. In 2021 Brighton hosted meetings on 21 days, including 5 evening meetings.

== Memorable events ==
On 3 August 1966, Norah Wilmot became the first official woman trainer of a winning horse in the UK when her horse won at Brighton. The Jockey Club had only granted women training licences after a legal challenge was taken to the Court of Appeal by fellow trainer Florence Nagle in July 1966, citing the Sex Disqualification (Removal) Act 1919.

Prominent racehorse owner Sheikh Mohammed had his first winner at Brighton racecourse on 20 June 1977 when his filly Hatta, trained by John Dunlop, won the £968 Bevendene Maiden Stakes. Top American jockey Steve Cauthen also reached a milestone at the course, winning his 1000th British race on odds-on favourite Picnicing on 5 August 1987.

Cricketer Ted Dexter used to frequent Brighton races, and is said to have once declared an innings for Sussex from the course.

The course was used as the setting of the Z-Cars two parter "Guns" and "Manslaughter" in 1975.

The horse with the most wins at Brighton is Pour La Victoire who got his 11th win at the course in August 2021 at the age of 11, and had the winners suite at the track named after him. The horse trained by A W Carroll (Tony) and was owned by Curry House Corner and Partner who announced his retired after the famous day.

== Other events ==
The course is also available as a venue for exhibitions, conferences, car rallies, circuses, antique fairs, business promotions and product launches, wedding receptions and other private parties.

== Bibliography ==
- Beavis, Jim (2003). The Brighton Races.

Cawthorne, George James; Herod, Richard S. (1902). Royal Ascot, Its History & Its Associations (PDF). London: A Treherne & Co.

- Erredge, John Ackerson (1862). History of Brighthelmston. Brighton, UK: E. Lewis. "brighton races."
- Fines, Ken (2002). A History of Brighton and Hove. Chichester, UK: Phillimore. ISBN 1860772315.
- Mortimer, Roger; Onslow, Richard; Willett, Peter (1978). Biographical Encyclopaedia of British Racing. London: Macdonald and Jane's. ISBN 0-354-08536-0.
- Sicklemore, Richard Sr. (1823). The history of Brighton from the earliest period to the present time. Brighton: Richard Sicklemore, Jr.
- Wright, Howard (1986). The Encyclopaedia of Flat Racing. London: Robert Hale. ISBN 0-7090-2639-0.
