= Róisín Owens =

Irish biochemist and lecturer

Roísín Owens
- Born: Roísín Meabh Owens
- Education: Trinity College, Dublin (BSc); University of Southampton (PhD)
- Awards: Suffrage Science award (2019)
- Scientific career
- Fields: Biomedical devices Barrier tissue Infectious diseases Biosensing conducting polymers
- Workplaces: Cornell University; École nationale supérieure des mines de Saint-Étienne; University of Cambridge
- Thesis: The BipA global regulator interacts with ribosomes (2002)
- Website: www.ceb.cam.ac.uk/directory/roisin-owens

Róisín Owens is a professor in the Department of Chemical Engineering and Biotechnology, University of Cambridge and a Fellow of Newnham College, Cambridge. Her research investigates new engineering technology for biological applications with a focus on organic bioelectronics, developing electroactive materials that can be used between physical transducers and soft biological tissues.

== Education and early life ==
Owens is from Glasnevin in Dublin. She earned a bachelor's degree in Natural Sciences with a focus on Biochemistry at Trinity College, Dublin in 1998. She completed her PhD at the University of Southampton with a thesis, The BipA global regulator interacts with ribosomes.

== Career and research ==
She moved to Cornell University to work as a postdoctoral researcher on host-pathogen interactions of Mycobacterium tuberculosis in the department of Microbiology and Immunology with David Russell. Owens worked at Agave BioSystems in New York between 2005 and 2007. She then joined the lab Moonsoo Jin, developing ICAM-1 of rhinovirus therapeutics.

Owens won a Marie Curie Reintegration Grant. The project resulted in a novel biosensor for enteric pathways. In 2009 Owens joined Ecole des Mines de St. Etienne, where she was appointed to Professor and Head of Department in 2016. Owens began working in bioelectronics after a discussion with her husband, "I was a biologist specializing in infectious diseases, and he was an expert in physics and materials science ... this was how we came up with this new project together, combining biology and electronics". In 2014 she took a sabbatical at the University of Thessaloniki.

She was the Principal Investigator (PI) for a major European Research Council grant, Exploitation of Organic Electrochemical Transistors for Use in Biological Ionsensing in 2010. In 2015 Owens won a €150,000 proof of concept grant from the European Research Council. In 2016 she won a European Research Council Consolidation grant.

In 2017 Owens joined the University of Cambridge. She is Principal Editor for Biomaterials, MRS Communications. She serves on the advisory board of the Wiley-Blackwell Advanced BioSystems and Journal of Applied Polymer Science.

=== Awards and honours ===
Owens won the Suffrage Science award in 2019, nominated by Rylie Green.
