= William Otto Adolph Julius Danckwerts =

British lawyer

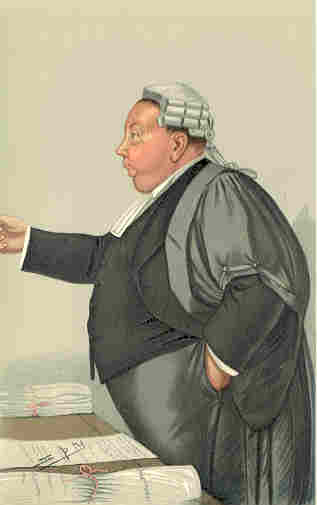
Vanity Fair caricature, 1898

William Otto Adolph Julius Danckwerts KC (1853 – 25 April 1914) was a British lawyer.

He was born Wilhelm Otto Adolf Julius in Heidelberg, Grand Duchy of Baden but emigrated to the Cape Colony with his parents in 1857.

He was educated at the school of the Reverend Robert Templeton, in the village of Bedford in the eastern Cape Colony, and then at Gill College. He entered Peterhouse, Cambridge in 1873, graduating with a B.A. in 1877. He studied law at the Inner Temple, was called to the bar in 1878, and became Queen’s Counsel in January 1900.

Early in his career, he acted for the prosecution in the cause célèbre of R v Dudley and Stephens.

He was counsel to Commissioners of Works and Public Buildings, and junior counsel to the Inland Revenue from 1895 to 1900.

Although he rose to the top of his profession and earned a high income for his day (£20,000 a year), he never became a judge.

== Family ==
He was the eldest son of Adolph Victor Danckwertz (also known as Viktor Adolf Danckwerts), a German doctor living in Somerset East, South Africa. Adolph Danckwerts was one of four doctors attached to the British German Legion which was recruited for service in the Crimean War. At the end of that war, many of these men were resettled in the Cape Colony.

He married Caroline Mary Lowther. His son, Sir Harold Otto Danckwerts (1888–1978), became a lawyer, judge, and Privy Counsellor; another son, Rear-Admiral Victor Hilary Danckwerts (1890–1944), was Deputy Commander-in-Chief of the Eastern Fleet and the father of his grandson Peter Victor Danckwerts, chemical engineer and George Cross recipient.
