= Elizabeth A. H. Hall =

British Professor of Analytical Biotechnology

Elizabeth (Lisa) Hall
- Citizenship: British
- Known for: Work on biosensors
- Scientific career
- Fields: Analytical Biotechnology
- Website: www.lisahall.com

Elizabeth Anne Howlett Hall CBE, CChem, FRSC is a British Professor of Analytical Biotechnology at the Institute of Biotechnology, Department of Chemical Engineering and Biotechnology at the University of Cambridge.

In 2015 Hall was the recipient of a CBE for her services to Higher Education and to Sport for the Disabled. Hall has been a Tutor for undergraduate and graduate students at Queens' College, Cambridge since 1988. She was the first female professor of Queens' College. In 2013, Hall was appointed Vice-President of Queens' College. Hall has been a member of St John's College, Cambridge since 1987. She became a Liveryman of the Worshipful Company of Instrument Makers in 2020 and became a Freeman of the City of London in 2019. She was awarded DSc honoris causa from the University of Chichester in 2018, in recognition of contribution to science, widening participation in sport and disability – and as a role model for women in science and engineering.

== Childhood and education ==
Hall is one of three siblings. Hall's high school education was at Stratford House School in Bickley, Kent where she was Head Girl from 1970 to 1971. Hall graduated from Queen Mary College, University of London with a BSc in Chemistry in 1974. She went on to earn a PhD from the Faculty of Science at the University of London in 1977. In 1988, she was awarded an MA from the University of Cambridge.

== Career ==
After earning her PhD, Hall spent two years as a postdoctoral fellow at the Laboratoire d'Electrochimie in Clermont, France (1977–1978) and the Institut für Organische Chemie, Johannes Gutenberg Universität, in Mainz, Germany (1978–1980). From 1980 to 1981 she worked as a Senior Analyst for Bernard Dyer and Partners in London, England. Later that year, Hall was recruited by the Nuffield Department of Anaesthetics, University of Oxford to work on blood and anaesthetic gas sensors.

In 1985 Hall relocated to the University of Cambridge where, from 1985 to 1999, she was a 'New Blood' Lecturer in Biosensors. From 1988 to 2004 she was a Lecturer in Natural Sciences at Queens' College Cambridge. From 1999 to 2003 she was a Reader in Analytical Science in the Institute of Biotechnology, University of Cambridge. Since 2003 Hall has served as the Professor of Cambridge Analytical Biotechnology. In 2008 she co-founded CamBridgeSens, a strategic vision to bridge sensor research activities across the University of Cambridge. From 2010 - 2018 Hall served as the Deputy Head (Research) at the department of Chemical engineering and Biotechnology.; she was Head of Department from 2018 - 2020.

=== Research ===
Hall's research "is focused on understanding how biology can be interfaced with electronic, mechanical and optical systems to achieve 'measurement' and diagnosis. This links transduction technologies (electrochemistry, optics, ultrasound) with synthetic biology and nanomaterials to achieve sensors and diagnostic systems. The research bridges theoretical methods and modelling with lab-based experimental science." Hall is particularly interested in biosensors and the idea of 'the measured self', as well as other measure environment from the molecular level to a whole system (living or abiotic). She has a special interest in diagnostics for low and middle income countries.

Hall (2016) writes:

[The use of biosensors] might involve connecting electrochemistry with an engineered enzyme and some neat signal processing to make glucose monitoring easier and cheaper for diabetics; it could be that we are using synthetic biology to design and produce new silk-like materials that change colour when they encounter bacteria; we might be taking inspiration from biology to modify electrodes so that they can respond to our personal environment: the room we are in, our breath, our activities. Sometimes, we find that we can use our knowledge to make hybrid systems: for example, ultrasound contrast agents can be turned into drug delivery vehicles, so that we can try and combine measurement with treatment.

According to the Royal Society of Chemistry journal Analyst, Hall's book Biosensors (published by Open University and Wiley) "was the first text book on biosensors to be targeted towards a treatment of an understanding of the underlying principles and has been the supporting text for undergraduates and graduates for many university courses." Hall conceived, designed and directed the Interdisciplanary Euro-collaboration in Molecular Sensor Technology programme. The programme brought together collaborators in engineering, physical, biological science, medicine and environmental science, to achieve advances in molecular sensor technology.

== Awards and honours ==
- The Queen's Birthday Honours List for services to Higher Education and Sport for the Disabled, 2015
- Recipient of the Oxburgh Medal for outstanding contribution to measurement, instrumentation and control in the field of environmental science and engineering, Institute of Measurement and Control, 2020
- SNU-Dongjin Distinguished Lectureship 2019
- Recipient of the Alec Hough-Grassby Memorial Award, Institute of Measurement and Control, 2009
- Queen Victoria Eugenia Anglo-Hispanic Chair in Chemistry, 2006
- Recipient of the Gold Medal from the Royal Society of Chemistry for innovation and leadership in Analytical Science, 2005
- Recipient of the Pilkington Teaching Prize, which recognises outstanding teaching in the University of Cambridge, 2001

== Organisations ==
- Senior MRC Research Fellow at Nuffield Department of Anaesthetics, University of Oxford, 1981–1985
- Awarded the status of Chartered Chemist (CChem) and became a member of the Royal Society of Chemistry (MRSC) in 1983.
- Member of the Institute of Physics and Engineering in Medicine (IPEM) since 1984
- Elected a Fellow of the Royal Society of Chemistry (FRSC); 2005
- Vice-President of Analytical Division of Royal Society of Chemistry (RSC), 2006 – 2008
- Chairman of Editorial Board of the journal Analyst, 2006 – 2010
- Served on the National Institute for Health & Clinical Excellence (NICE) Diagnostics Advisory Committee, 2010 – 2013

== Personal life ==
In June 2013, Hall married Dr John Robert Saffell at Queens' College. Hall is an avid athlete who has competed in the Merlin Rocket Nationals. She also enjoys rowing, lacrosse and netball.

From 1992 to 2018, Hall served as the Chairman of Disability Snowsport UK (DSUK, with subsidiary British Parasnowsport), a charity originally providing winter-sport holidays for people with Cerebral Palsy. In 2019, Hall became president of DSUK.

In 1995 Hall wrote and delivered a business plan to underpin the development of the sport nationally for people with all disabilities and to create a grass-roots to elite sport programme. The plan included building a centre on Cairngorm that was integrated in the Cairngorm Mountain Centre development opened in 2000. British Parasnowsport were responsible for identifying potential Para-olympians and were successful in achieving podium medal status in Söchi and PyeongChang, bringing home Team GB's first Alpine gold medals.

Hall is a trustee of the Boaz Project, an organisation that provides farming related activities for adults with learning disabilities.
