= Sabine Bahn =

British academic

Sabine Bahn MD, PhD, MRCPsych
- Scientific career
- Fields: Neurotechnology and Neuropsychiatry
- Institutions: University of Cambridge, England; Erasmus Medical Centre in Rotterdam, The Netherlands

Sabine Bahn is a professor of Neurotechnology, Professor & Director of the Bahn Laboratory at The University of Cambridge, a Professor of Translational Neuropsychiatry at Erasmus Medical Centre

Bahn's research in The Bahn laboratory at Cambridge is focused on researching the molecular basis of neuropsychiatric diseases; using molecular profiling methods to investigate abnormalities in tissues, blood and fluids; as well as developing new methods for diagnosing and treating psychiatric disorders, in particular focussing on schizophrenia and mood disorders. The Bahn laboratory is supported by laboratory facilities at the Department of Chemical Engineering and Biotechnology, Cambridge and has received funding through the Stanley Medical Research Institute (SMRI), in addition to being partnered with the Stanley Program for Epidemiology, Prevention and Treatment of Schizophrenia (SPECTS).

== Work ==
Psychiatric disorders are increasingly recognised as disorders of the whole body

— Sabine Bahn, https://www.cam.ac.uk/research/news/new-approach-to-drug-discovery-could-lead-to-personalised-treatment-of-neuropsychiatric-disorders

Sabine Bahn is a practising psychiatrist and honorary consultant in psychiatry at the Peterborough and Cambridge NHS trust

=== Psynova ===
Bahn founded Psynova Neureotech in 2005, which is a company specialising in the commercial applications of biomarkers for mental illnesses. In 2011, Psynova Neurotech was bought by Myriad Genetics, a NASDAQ listed diagnostics company.

=== Psyomics ===
Bahn co-founded Psyomics with Dan Cowell, who is the CEO, in March 2015. The company aims to improve the identification and diagnosis processes of mental health issues, through the use of digital tools, biological tests and scientific research. This could help the patient access and understand treatment options available. Currently, the team is working on developing tools for early detection in the workplace, as well as concentrating on diagnosing depression and bipolar disorder in a clinical context.

== Achievements ==
Professor Bahn has published over 180 articles in well-known scientific journals and has co-founded 2 spin-out companies, (Pysnova and Psyomics). In 2015 Bahn was made a Fellow of the Royal Society of Biology. She is a fellow of Lucy Cavendish College in the University of Cambridge.

== Publications ==
- E. Schwarz, Y. Levin, L. Wang, M. Leweke & S. Bahn - 'Peptide correlation: A means to identify high quality quantitative information in large scale proteomic studies', J.Sep. Sci, August, 7;30(14): 2190-2197, (2007).
- Y. Levin, E. Schwarz, L. Wang, M. Leweke & S. Bahn - 'Label free LC-MSMS quantitative proteomics for large scale biomarker discovery in complex samples', J.Sep. Sci, August 2;30(14): 2198-2203, 2007).
- T.J. Huang, F.M. Leweke, T.M. Tsang, D. Koethe, C.W. Gerth, B.M. Nolden, S. Gross, K. Schreiber, E. Holmes & S. Bahn - 'CSF metabolic and proteomic profiles in patients prodromal for psychosis', PLoS One, August 22;2:e756, (2007).
- E. Schwarz, Y. Levin, L. Wang, M. Leweke & S. Bahn - 'Peptide correlation: A means to identify high quality quantitative information in large scale proteomic studies', J.Sep. Sci, August, 7;30(14):2190-2197, (2007).
- S. Bahn - 'Gene expression in bipolar disorder and schizophrenia: new approaches to old problems', Bipolar Disord., 4, Suppl 1:70-2, (2002).

=== Reviews ===
- K.E. Wilson, M.M. Ryan, J.E. Prime, P.D. Pashby, P.R. Orange, G. O'Beirne, J.G. Whateley, S. Bahn & C.M. Morris - 'Functional Genomics and Proteomics: Application in Neurosciences'. J. Neurology Neurosurg Psychiatry, 75(4):529-538, (2004).
- S. Bahn, M. Ryan, S. Augood, M. Mimac & P. Emson - 'Gene expression in the post-mortem human brain - no cause for dismay', J. Chem. Neuroanat., 22, 79-94, (2001).

=== Books/ Book chapters ===
- S. Hemby & S. Bahn (editors) - Functional Genomics and Proteomics in the Clinical Neurosciences, Elsevier, (2006).
- S. Bahn - 'Gene expression in psychotic disorders: dissecting the basis of complex neuropsychiatric disorders', Search for the Causes of Schizophrenia, Volume 5, Gattaz & Haefner (editors), Springer, (2004).
- M. Starkey, S. Bahn & H. Mahadeva - 'Indexing-based differential display', Analysing Gene Expression, P. Lorkowski & P. Cullen (editors), Wiley-VCH, (2002).
- S.Bahn & W. Wisden - 'A map of non-NMDA receptor subunit expression in the vertebrate brain derived from in situ hybridisation histochemistry', The Ionotropic Glutamate Receptors, D.T. Monaghan & R.T. Wenthold (editors), Humana Press, (1996).

== Sources ==
- Business Weekly Article 'Cambridge University spin-out aiming to improve patient outcomes in mental health arena'
- University of Cambridge Research 'New approach to drug discovery could lead to personalised treatment of neuropsychiatric disorders'
- Lucy Cavendish College Fellows
- University of Cambridge Directory, Department of Chemical Engineering and Biotechnology
- Cambridge Centre for Neuropsychiatric Research
