= John Davidson (chemical engineer) =

British chemical engineer (1926–2019)

Professor John Davidson FRS FREng FIChemE
- Born: John Frank Davidson; 7 February 1926
- Died: 25 December 2019 (aged 93)
- Education: University of Cambridge
- Awards: Royal Medal (1999); FREng
- Scientific career
- Fields: Chemical engineering
- Workplaces: University of Cambridge

John Frank Davidson (7 February 1926 – 25 December 2019) was a British chemical engineer and former Shell Professor of Chemical Engineering at the University of Cambridge. He is widely acknowledged as the "founding father of fluidization in chemical engineering".

== Early life ==
John Frank Davidson was born in Newcastle upon Tyne on 7 February 1926, the son of Katie (née Jarrett) and John Davidson, who met in 1911 on a package holiday in Switzerland. His father, who fought in the trenches during World War I and later worked as a cashier for Newcastle City Council, died when Davidson was nine. Having previously been employed as a primary school teacher in the East End of London, his mother then returned to work to support Davidson and his older sister, Katie. From 1937 to 1944, he was a pupil at Heaton Grammar School, and obtained a state bursary to study mechanical sciences at Trinity College, Cambridge. After receiving the degree of Bachelor of Arts in 1947, Davidson joined Rolls-Royce in Derby, where he served two and a half years in the Mechanical Development Department. Having returned in 1950 to Cambridge, he became a graduate student in the Engineering Department (1950–1952). At the end of 1952, he passed to the recently founded Department of Chemical Engineering of the University of Cambridge.

In that period, Davidson began to theoretically study the motion of large gas bubbles in liquids and wrote his still widely cited works on the mass transfer between a bubble and a liquid flowing past it. However, what is more important, these studies stimulated him to carry out a number of pioneering works on fluidisation, which were generalised in his book Fluidised Particles (1963), written with David Harrison (later, this book was translated into Russian). This was one of the first books on fluidisation, and it generated keen interest.

== Career ==
Davidson's works made an important contribution to the development of the hydrodynamics of a circulating fluidised bed and the heat transfer in a fluidised bed and also to the creation and implementation of methods for lignite combustion in a fluidised bed. Davidson received the degree of PhD in 1953 and the degree of Doctor of Science in 1968 at the University of Cambridge. In 1974, for works on two-phase flows and, first of all, for achievements in fluidisation, he was elected a Fellow of the Royal Society in chemical engineering (He was elected as a vice-president, Royal Society of London, 1989). In 1974–1975, he was a member of the Court of Enquiry for the Flixborough disaster.

Davidson's research work was always closely related to his pedagogical activities. He started as a university demonstrator in chemical engineering (1950) and then was a university lecturer (1954), a reader in chemical engineering (1964), and a professor (1975). In 1975–1993, Davidson headed the Department of Chemical Engineering of the University of Cambridge and did much for the development of the department, updating of the curriculum, and strengthening of relations with industry. In 1978–1993, he bore the title of Shell Professor of Chemical Engineering since Shell was an important sponsor of the foundation of the department.

Indissoluble are the ties of Davidson's life and activities with Trinity College, which lasted from 1944 to his death. In 1957, he became the college's steward responsible for the entire household, including organisation of receptions of the royal family. The most difficult challenge in this period was the reconstruction of the Old Kitchen, built in 1605. This reconstruction lasted several years in the early 1960s. In 1992–1996, Davidson was vice master of Trinity College.

In 1970–1971, Davidson was president of the Institution of Chemical Engineers; he is a Foreign Associate of the US National Academy of Engineering (1976), Docteur Honoris Causa de l'Institut National Polytechnique de Toulouse (1979), an Honorary Doctor of Science of the University of Aston (1989), and a Foreign Fellow of the Indian National Science Academy (1991). He has the Kurnakov Memorial Medal given by the Kurnakov Institute of General and Inorganic Chemistry of the USSR Academy of Sciences (1991) and was elected a foreign member of the Russian Academy of Engineering (1998). In 1999, Davidson was awarded the Royal Medal of the Royal Society of London.

Davidson was a frequent participant at and guest of Mendeleev congresses, at which he has delivered plenary lectures. He continued active research work at the Department of Chemical Engineering of Cambridge University after his retirement in 1992.

== Personal life ==
In 1948, Davidson married Susanne Hedwig Ostberg, a Holocaust refugee he met in the engineering department at Cambridge. The couple had a son, Peter, a chemical engineer, and daughter, Isabel, a government lawyer who married future Conservative MP Oliver Letwin.

== Recognition ==
He was awarded a Royal Medal in 1999 for his chemical engineering work, and has been a Fellow of the Royal Society since 1974. He was president of the Institution of Chemical Engineers (IChemE) from 1970 to 1971 and vice-president of the Royal Society in 1989. He was appointed a Fellow of the Royal Academy of Engineering. In 1994, the National Portrait Gallery, London, along with the Royal Society, commissioned a portrait of Davidson by photographer Nick Sinclair, which was acquired for its permanent collection.
