= Jane Priestman =

British designer (1930–2021)

- Born: 7 April 1930; Hitchin, Hertfordshire, England
- Died: 25 January 2021 (aged 90)
- Education: Northwood College and Liverpool College of Art
- Known for: design and architecture
- Children: 2

Jane Priestman OBE (7 April 1930 – 25 January 2021) was a British designer who worked in design and architecture. She was appointed an OBE in 1991 for her work in design and an honorary doctorate from Sheffield Hallam University in 1998.

== Early life and education ==
Jane Herbert was the daughter of electrical engineer Reuben Stanley Herbert and Mary Elizabeth Ramply. She was educated at Northwood College and Liverpool College of Art. She qualified as an interior designer.

== Career ==
Priestman ran her own design practice in the mid-1950s for about 20 years. She set it up shortly after graduating from university.

She became general manager in architecture and design for the British Airport Authority in 1975 and remained in the post until 1986, when she became director of architecture, design and environment for British Rail until 1991. At British Rail, she commissioned work from Norman Foster, and worked with Nicholas Grimshaw on Waterloo International railway station.

She spent 18 years, until 2010, as chair of Open City (the organisation behind Open House London). She also became an Enabler, in 2001, for the Commission for Architecture and the Built Environment (CABE).

She was shortlisted for the Jane Drew Prize in 1998, for inclusiveness in architecture.

In 1985, Priestman became an honorary member of the Royal Institute of British Architects (RIBA). She was awarded the Ada Louise Huxtable Prize award in 2015, aged 85, for her accomplishments in design.

== Personal life and death ==
She married Arthur Priestman in 1954. They had two children.

Priestman died on 25 January 2021 at the age of 90.
