= Shell Professor of Chemical Engineering =

The Shell Professor of Chemical Engineering is an endowed chair in chemical engineering at the University of Cambridge, one of many endowed chairs at Cambridge.

== History and influence ==
The Shell Chair was created in 1945 after a donation was made by Royal Dutch Shell for the purpose of creating the Department of Chemical Engineering of the University of Cambridge. Terence Fox served as the first Shell Professor. Initially the Shell Professors also chaired the chemical engineering department, but in 1998 these two roles were separated, with the department chair becoming a fixed-term position that could also be held by other professors.

John Augustus Oriel, chief chemist for Shell and later president of the Institution of Chemical Engineers, played a key role in persuading the company to make this donation and in negotiating its terms with the university. The donation of £435,000 was, at the time, the second-largest gift the university had been given. At the time of the donation, representatives for Shell argued that the Shell Professors should be paid considerably more than other Cambridge professors, because of the need to compete with industry salaries, but this did not happen.

The Shell Chair is frequently cited in anti-corporate activism as an example of industry funding of academic research.

== Chairholders ==
The Shell Professors have been:

- 1945–1959: Terence Fox
- 1959–1978: Peter Danckwerts
- 1978–1993: John Davidson
- 1993–2004: John Bridgwater
- 2004–present: Lynn Gladden
