= John Bridgwater =

British chemical engineer (1938–2021)

John Bridgwater FREng (10 January 1938 – May 2021) was Shell Professor of Chemical Engineering at the University of Cambridge.

== Life ==
Bridgwater was born 10 January 1938 and went to Solihull School. He gained a Bachelor of Arts (BA) degree in chemical engineering at St Catharine's College, Cambridge, in 1959, an Master of Science in Engineering (MSE) degree in chemical engineering at Princeton University in 1961. He then worked for Courtaulds before returning to Cambridge, becoming a lecturer in 1964 and obtaining a Doctor of Philosophy (PhD) degree in 1973.

In 1980, he took up a post as professor in the School of Chemical Engineering at the University of Birmingham, becoming Head of Department from 1983 to 1989, and Dean of the Faculty from 1989-1992. In 1993, he took up the position of Shell Professor of Chemical Engineering at Cambridge, which he held until his retirement in 2004, being also Head of Department from 1993 to 1998. Upon his retirement, a symposium was held to celebrate his achievements, particularly in research into particle science, in which he had authored some 200 papers.

He died in May 2021.

== Honours ==
Bridgwater was a Fellow of the Royal Academy of Engineering from 1987 and President of the Institution of Chemical Engineers for 1997–1998. He was Emeritus Professor of the Department of Chemical Engineering and Biotechnology of the University of Cambridge.
