= Lewes Racecourse =

Former horse racing venue in East Sussex, England

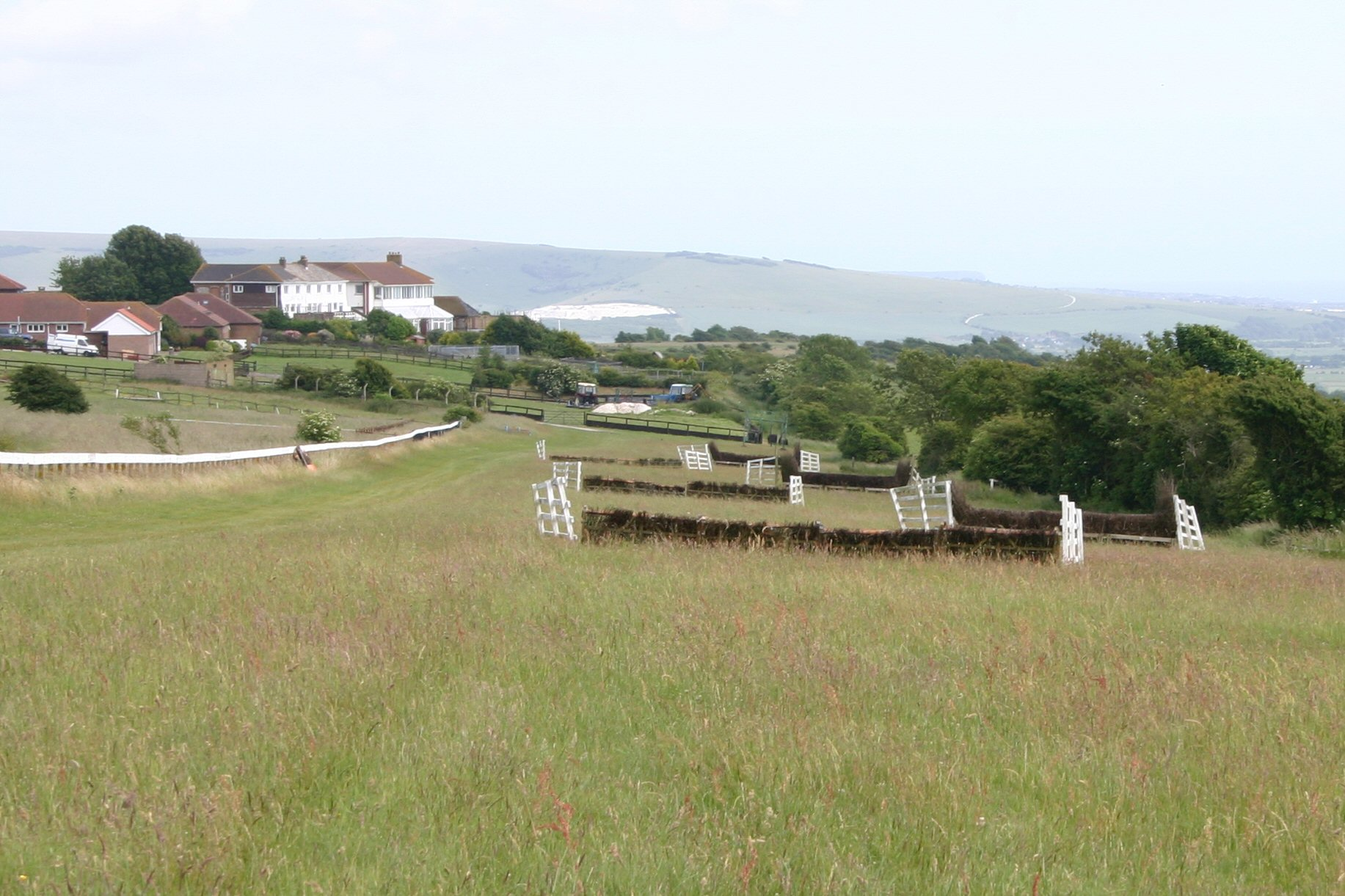
The racecourse site

Lewes Racecourse is a former racecourse in East Sussex, southern England. The racecourse was located near the town of Lewes and hosted flat racing from at least 1712 until its closure in September 1964.

== Location and layout ==
Lewes is the county town of East Sussex, about nine miles from Brighton. Lewes racecourse was located about three miles north-west of the town, on ground which was excellent for racing, 500 feet above sea level, at the foot of the Black Cap Hill.

The course was a right-handed horseshoe, originally two and half miles long, then two miles, then reduced to one and a half miles after the First World War. The home straight was five furlongs, with the ground falling gradually for over three furlongs followed by a slight rise towards the finish.

John Rickman wrote: "It is one of the delights of this meeting to watch the horses line up at the 1½ miles start, across the great yawning Cuckoo Bottom, then see them race along the crest of the Downs before passing the mile post and clumps of golden gorse, to swing sharply in the straight near the 5 furlongs start."

== History ==
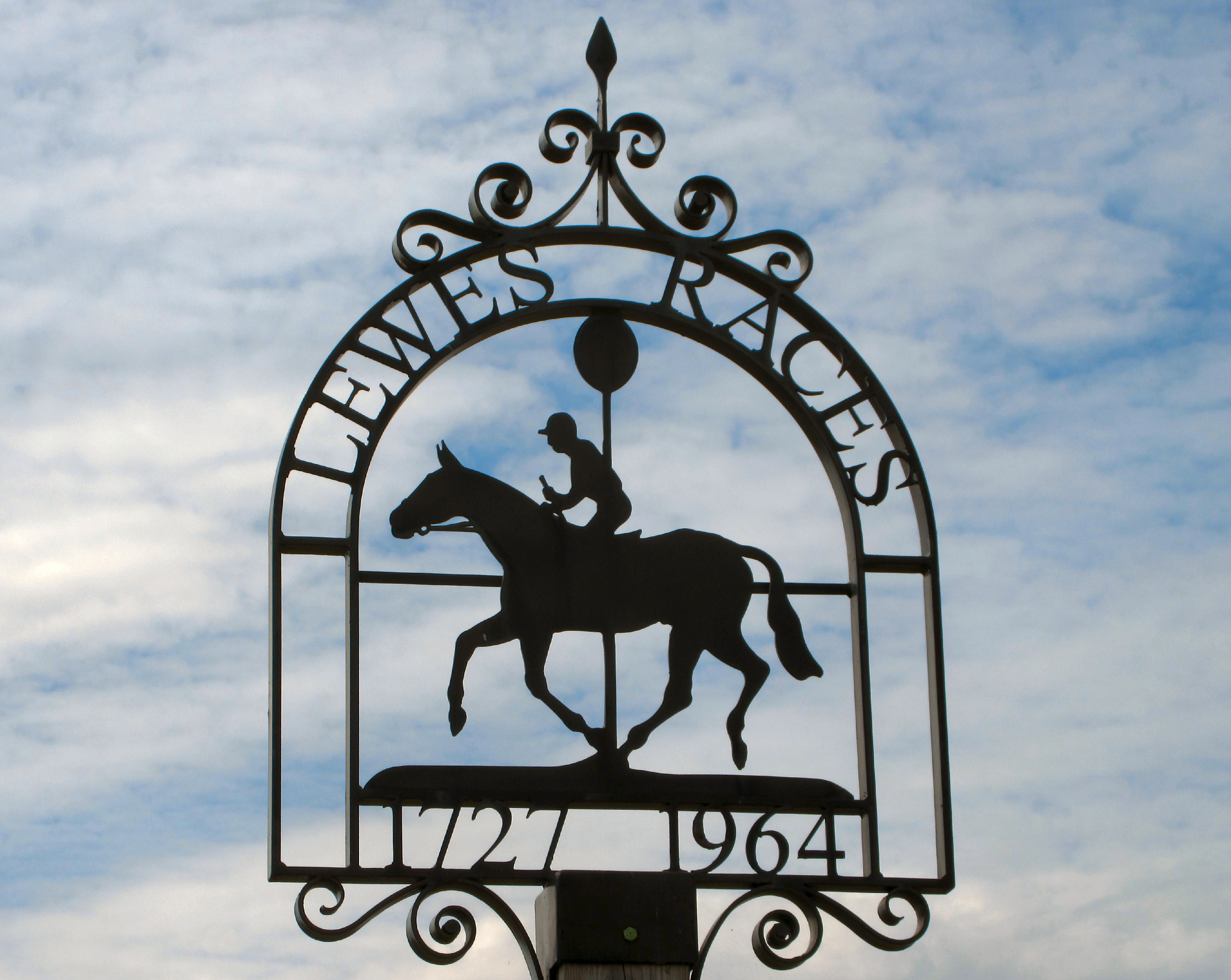
Lewes Races sign

The earliest record of racing at the course is an article in the London Gazette in May 1712, which mentions: "A Great Plate, a Town Plate of 15 pounds, and a Galloway Plate, to be run on the Lewes Plate Course on 27th May 1712".

The course was holding regular meetings by 1727, when a two-day meeting was held on 10 and 11 August. The main race was the King's Plate.

The course's first stands were built in 1772. The winner of the first Derby, Diomed, ran its last race at Lewes in 1783.

The Prince of Wales (later George IV) was a regular visitor to the course. He came to Lewes in 1806, riding in a barouche, drawn by six greys (according to a Brighton newspaper) to watch a match, over four miles, between Colonel Mellish's Sancho, the winner of the St Leger in 1804, and Pavilion, owned by the Earl of Darlington. Pavilion won, and Colonel Mellish is said to have lost £20,000. The royal party visited the Star Inn at Lewes for refreshments.

There was a remarkable race for the Astley Stakes of 1880, worth £1,627, when five horses passed the winning post together. The judge decided that Scobell, Wandering Nun and Mazurka had dead-heated for first place, and that the other two horses, Cumberland (ridden by Fred Archer) and Thora had also dead-heated, a head behind the winning trio.

Fred Archer, who was champion jockey for 13 consecutive years from 1874 to 1886, frequently rode at Lewes, and on 5 August 1882 he rode six of the seven winners at the meeting. He had his last race at Lewes, on a Thursday afternoon in October 1886, on Tommy Tittlemouse in the Castle Plate. On 8 November he shot himself at his home in Newmarket; the jury at the inquest decided that he committed suicide "whilst in a state of unsound mind". He was 29 years of age.

In its heyday Lewes held six meetings over nine days: Monday, Tuesday, Friday, Saturday, Monday, Tuesday. However, the racing authorities stopped these extended meetings in 1955, and allocated mainly Monday meetings to Lewes. This saw a steady decline in the fortunes of the course, and the final meeting was held on Monday 14 September 1964.
