= Rylie Green =

Australian biomedical engineer

- Education: University of New South Wales
- Occupation: Bioengineer
- Employer: Imperial College London
- Known for: Biomaterials for regenerative medicine

Rylie Green is an Australian biomedical engineer who is a professor at Imperial College London. She works on bioactive conducting polymers for applications in medical electronics.

== Education ==
Green is Australian. She received her PhD in neural interfaces from the School of Biomedical Engineering, University of New South Wales (UNSW) in 2008. She remained at UNSW for her postdoctoral studies, focussing on bioactive and cellular components for tissue engineering.

== Research ==
Green's research focuses on developing new polymer materials for electronics, identifying biomaterials for regenerative medicine and bio-interfacial engineering for neuroprosthetics. She aims to extend the lifetimes of bioelectronic devices such as bionic eyes, robot limbs and brain–computer interface, so they are effective over a patient's life. In Green's research group they improve the mechanical properties of conductive polymers for implant applications, develop characterisation techniques and analyse neural tissue in vitro using techniques such as two photon intravital microscopy.

Green joined Imperial College London in 2016. In 2017 Green received a £1 million grant from EPSRC to explore new polymers for implants, which encourage interaction with surrounding nerves and prevent rejection in the body. She will focus on cochlear implants and new types of bionic eye implants. She is collaborating with Galvani Bioelectronics and Boston Scientific.

== Public engagement ==
She spoke about Improving Implants at the Australian High Commission at the 2017 Pint of Science, and the Science Museum biology themed lates.

== Recognition ==
Green was one of 16 applicants from 80 to be given a Fresh Science award in 2010, which recognises upcoming scientists throughout Australia. As a part of the award, she gave a presentation of her work on conductive bioplastics at Melbourne Museum.

Green has also received the Rudolf Cimdins Scholarship from the European Society for Biomaterials, which covers the registration costs for attendance at the society's annual conference.

In 2017, Green won a Suffrage Science Women in Science Award, which recognises scientific achievements and ability to inspire others.
