= Terence Fox =

British chemical engineer

Terence Robert Corelli Fox
- Born: 2 May 1912
- Died: 5 October 1962 (aged 50)
- Other names: T.R.C. Fox
- Occupation: Chemical engineer

Terence Robert Corelli Fox (2 May 1912 – 5 October 1962), often called T.R.C. Fox, was a notable British chemical engineer. He was a member of the Atomic Energy Council and the first Shell Professor of Chemical Engineering at the University of Cambridge.

Fox was born on 2 May 1912, the son of an electrical engineer, and attended Regent Street Polytechnic Technical School and Jesus College, Cambridge. He graduated from the latter in 1933 with a degree in mechanical sciences. The Oxford Dictionary of National Biography describes his success in the tripos as "unparalleled"; he received a starred first and all available prizes, including the Rex Moir Prize and prizes for the best marks in Thermodynamics, Aeronautical Engineering and Structures, all in the same examination.

Fox returned to the Engineering Department at Cambridge four years after graduating, having first served a stint as a technical assistant at Imperial Chemical Industries. He began as a demonstrator and became a fellow of King's College, Cambridge in 1941. Due to his teaching position he did not see active service in the Second World War, but he was commissioned as a second lieutenant in the university Officer Training Corps, Royal Signals section, on 3 October 1942, a commission he resigned on 9 February 1946.

In 1945, he became a lecturer in the Engineering Department at Cambridge. In that same year, on 2 March 1945, the university accepted an endowment to form a chemical engineering department by the Shell Group of Oil Companies, who would also sponsor a department chair. Though not established in the field, Fox was announced as the first to fill the chair position in June 1946.

Fox spent several years preparing the department before beginning to accept students in 1948. He was a supportive chair, dedicated to financing and furthering the research of others, including the team of Francis Thomas Bacon when they developed the hydrogen-oxygen fuel cell. He remained in the position until 1959, when poor health forced him to retire, and was succeeded by Peter Victor Danckwerts.

According to The Oxford Dictionary of National Biography, Fox's poor health was the result of a high stress personality, which led him to "a succession of nervous breakdowns in the early 1950s". This was not helped by his tendency towards micromanagement: it was said that "he would use as much effort in spending 10s. as £10,000." He died at the National Hospital for Nervous Diseases in London on 5 October 1962.

On 2 March 1963, the T.R.C. Fox Fund was established at Cambridge in tribute to his memory. The Fund is used to provide an annual award to the student who does best on the Chemical Engineering Tripos, as long as that student is able to attain "the standard of the first class".
