= Dankwart Danckwerts =

German sociologist

Dankwart Danckwerts (14 March 1933, in Hamburg – 11 May 2012, in Hamburg) was a German sociologist.

After some time in business, he qualified in sociology and economics, graduated from the University of Hamburg in 1960, and worked at the University of Münster with Helmut Schelsky, where he gained his doctoral degree (Dr. sc. pol.), in 1963.

After doing fieldwork in Chile, he was called to a chair of Sociology at the University of Duisburg up to 1998, where he, besides general theory, specialized in the sociology of transportation. He remained active in sociological research.

A Festschrift was published on his 65th birthday in 1998.
