= Lynn Gladden =

British chemical engineer

Professor Dame Lynn Gladden DBE FRS FRSC FInstP FREng
- Born: Lynn Faith Gladden; 30 July 1961 (age 65)
- Citizenship: British
- Education: Heathfield School, Pinner: University of Bristol (BSc); University of Oxford (PGCE); University of Cambridge (PhD)
- Awards: Beilby Medal and Prize (1995); Tilden Prize (2001); Royal Society Bakerian Medal (2014); Top 50 Influential Women in Engineering (2016)
- Scientific career
- Fields: Chemical engineering; Magnetic resonance imaging
- Workplaces: EPSRC; University of Cambridge; University of California, Berkeley; British Land
- Thesis: Structural studies of inorganic glasses (1987)
- Website: www.ceb.cam.ac.uk/directory/lynn-gladden

Dame Lynn Faith Gladden (born 30 July 1961) is the Shell Professor of Chemical Engineering at the University of Cambridge. She served as pro-vice-chancellor for research from 2010 to 2016.

Gladden was elected a member of the National Academy of Engineering in 2015 for contributions to chemical reactor engineering through the uniquely specific application of magnetic resonance imaging.

From October 2018 to June 2023, she was the executive chair at the EPSRC.

== Early life and education ==
Gladden was born on 30 July 1961. Her father is John Montague Gladden and her mother is Sheila Faith Deverell. Gladden was educated at the Heathfield School in Harrow. She obtained a Bachelor of Science (BSc) degree in Chemical Physics at the University of Bristol in 1982, and afterwards moved to Trinity College, Cambridge, where she gained a PhD degree in physical chemistry in 1987. She also holds a Postgraduate Certificate in Education (PGCE) in Physics from the University of Oxford.

== Career and research ==
Gladden began her career as a lecturer at the University of Cambridge from 1987 to 1991. She was appointed reader in 1995, serving until 1999 when she was promoted to professor. She was head of the Department of Chemical Engineering and Biotechnology, University of Cambridge until 1 October 2010. She was also a pro-vice-chancellor from January 2010 to January 2016, and has been a Fellow of Trinity College, Cambridge since 1999.

Gladden is the lead researcher at the university's magnetic resonance research centre (MRRC). She is chair of the judging panel for the Queen Elizabeth Prize for Engineering. Gladden was appointed as a non-executive director of British Land in March 2015.

=== Honours and awards ===
She is a Chartered Chemist, a Chartered Engineer, a Fellow of the Institution of Chemical Engineers, a Fellow of the Institute of Physics (FInstP) and a Fellow of the Royal Society of Chemistry (FRSC).

- 1995: Awarded Beilby Medal and Prize
- 2001: Appointed Officer of the Order of the British Empire (OBE) for services to chemistry
- 2001: Awarded the Tilden Prize of the Royal Society of Chemistry
- 2003: Elected a Fellow of the Royal Academy of Engineering (FREng)
- 2004: Elected a Fellow of the Royal Society (FRS)
- 2009: Appointed Commander of the Order of the British Empire (CBE) for services to chemical engineering in the 2009 Birthday Honours
- 2014: Awarded the Royal Society Bakerian Medal
- 2015: Elected a foreign member of the US National Academy of Engineering
- 2016: named Top 50 Influential Women in Engineering by the Women's Engineering Society

Gladden was appointed Dame Commander of the Order of the British Empire (DBE) in the 2020 New Year Honours for services to academic and industrial research in chemical engineering.
