= Frances Kirkham =

Frances Margaret Kirkham CBE (born 29 October 1947) is a British judge and former member of the Judicial Appointments Commission.

Kirkham was educated at King's College London where she obtained a BA degree and an AKC qualification, and became a solicitor in 1978. She is also a Chartered Arbitrator. In October 2000 she became a Senior Circuit Judge and is the designated Technology and Construction Court judge in Birmingham. She founded West Midlands Association of Women Solicitors and is a founder member of the UK Association of Women Judges. She was appointed as a member of the Judicial Appointments Commission in January 2006, as a representative for the judiciary.

Kirkham was the coroner at the inquest into the death of six people in the Lakanal House fire.

She was appointed Commander of the Order of the British Empire (CBE) in the 2011 Birthday Honours.

She has been an international commercial court judge for the Qatar International Court since 2013.
