= Peter Danckwerts =

George Cross recipient and chemical engineer

Peter Danckwerts GC MBE FRS
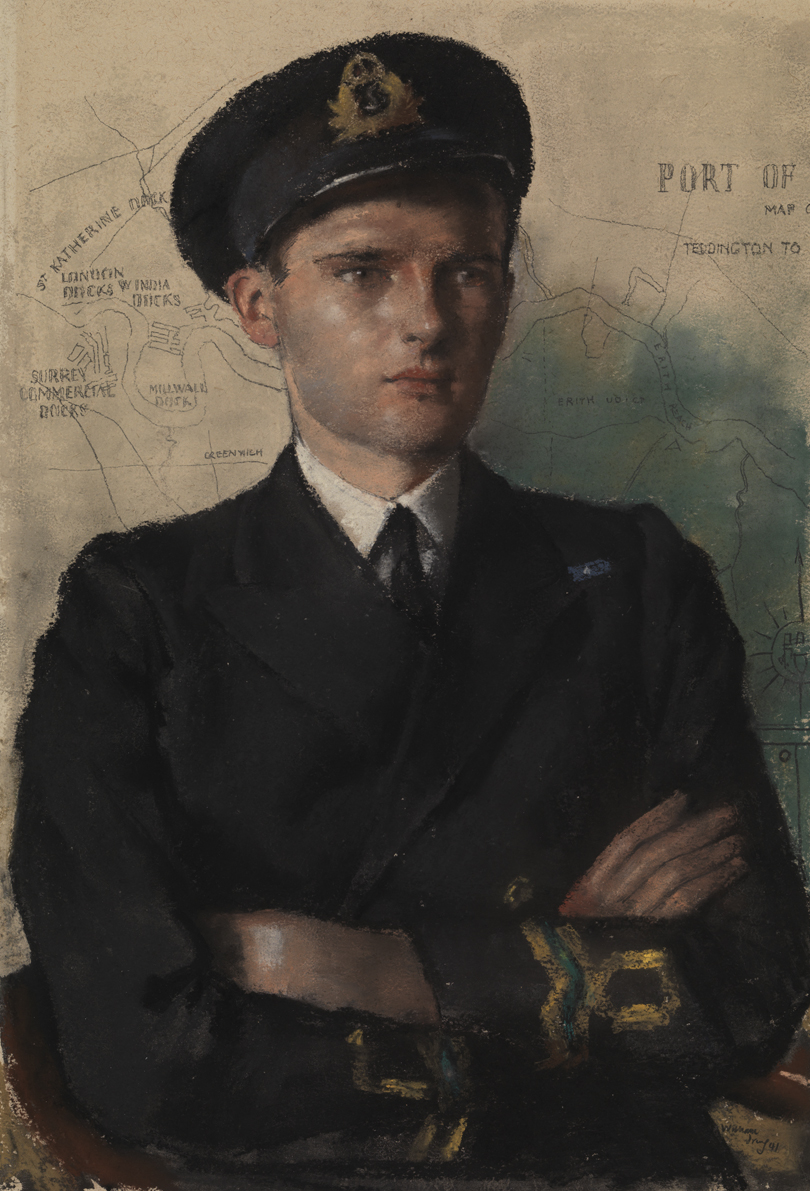
- Lieutenant Danckwerts, RNVR, in 1941. Painted by William Dring
- Born: Peter Victor Danckwerts; 14 October 1916; Emsworth, England
- Died: 25 October 1984 (aged 68); Cambridge, England
- Relatives: Victor Danckwerts (father)
- Military career
- Allegiance: United Kingdom
- Branch: Volunteer Reserve
- Rank: Lieutenant
- Unit: HMS President
- Conflicts: Second World War: The Blitz; Allied invasion of Sicily
- Awards: George Cross; Member of the Order of the British Empire
- Other work: Shell Professor of Chemical Engineering at the University of Cambridge (1959–77); Fellow of Pembroke College, Cambridge

Peter Victor Danckwerts (14 October 1916 – 25 October 1984) was a chemical engineer who pioneered the concept of the residence time distribution. In 1940, during the Second World War, he was awarded the George Cross for his work in defusing Parachute mines. He later became Shell Professor of Chemical Engineering at the University of Cambridge and a Fellow of Pembroke College, Cambridge.

== Early life ==
Danckwerts was the eldest of the five children of Vice-Admiral Victor Hilary Danckwerts and his wife Joyce Middleton. His grandfather was William Otto Adolph Julius Danckwerts, a noted barrister. He showed an early interest in chemistry, constructing his own laboratory in an attic at home. He was educated at Stubbington House School, Winchester College and Balliol College, Oxford, where he obtained first-class honours in Chemistry in 1939.

== Second World War ==
Danckwerts was made a sub-lieutenant in the Royal Naval Volunteer Reserve at the beginning of the Second World War, and was trained as a bomb disposal officer. In 1940 he was posted to the Port of London Authority, and received the George Cross for the "great gallantry and undaunted devotion to duty" he showed in defusing land mines dropped by the Luftwaffe on London: despite not being trained to handle magnetic mines, he volunteered to attempt to defuse them, which he did successfully, on one occasion working continuously for almost two days, dealing with 16 mines.

Later in the war he undertook bomb disposal work abroad and was wounded in a minefield in Sicily, after which he was posted to the Combined Operations Headquarters in Whitehall. In December 1942 he was appointed a Member of the Order of the British Empire "for gallantry and undaunted devotion to duty".

== Post-war career ==
After the war, Danckwerts studied chemical engineering, obtaining a master's degree from Massachusetts Institute of Technology thanks to a Harkness Fellowship. His return to Britain coincided with a donation to Cambridge University by Shell, which allowed the university to set up a dedicated chemical engineering department under Terence Fox.

Danckwerts became a lecturer and researcher, but felt he had insufficient teaching experience to lecture effectively, and as a result left to join the United Kingdom Atomic Energy Authority in 1954. He left this job in 1956 to become a professor of chemical engineering science at Imperial College London, a newly created position, where he continued to research as well as teach. In 1959 Fox resigned as Shell Professor of Chemical Engineering at Cambridge, and Danckwerts was elected to take his place.

As Shell Professor, Danckwerts did a large amount of research, particularly in the fields of mixing phenomena and gas absorption, and became a noted international speaker. In 1951, he proposed the Dankwerts surface-renewal model, primarily inspired by the Higbie model (1935) for gas absorption into liquids. He was elected a Fellow of the Royal Society in 1969 and received honorary degrees from the universities of Bradford and Loughborough. He received an Honorary Science Doctorate from the University of Bath (1983) and he also gained foreign associateship of the National Academy of Engineering.

Between 1965 and 1966 he served as president of the Institution of Chemical Engineers and, after retiring from the Shell professorship in 1977, became the executive editor of Chemical Engineering Science journal. He died in Cambridge on 25 October 1984, his wife surviving him.
