= Victor Danckwerts =

Royal Navy admiral

Rear-Admiral Victor Danckwerts CMG
- Born: 1890
- Died: 1944 (aged 53–54)
- Relatives: Peter Danckwerts (son)
- Military career
- Allegiance: United Kingdom
- Branch: Royal Navy
- Rank: Rear-Admiral
- Commands: HMS Caradoc; Sixth Destroyer Flotilla
- Conflicts: World War I World War II

Rear-Admiral Victor Hilary Danckwerts CMG (1890–1944) was a Royal Navy officer who served in the First and Second World Wars.

He commanded the light cruiser Caradoc at the beginning of the 1930s and then served as one of the Assistant Directors of Plans at the Admiralty in 1932–1934. He commanded the Sixth Destroyer Flotilla in 1936–1938 and then became Director of Plans in 1938–1940. Danckwerts served as the Deputy Commander-in-Chief, Eastern Fleet from 1942 until his death two years later.

== Bibliography ==
- Halpern, Paul G., ed. (2016). The Mediterranean Fleet, 1930–1939. Publications of the Navy Records Society. Vol. 163. London: Routledge for the Navy Records Society. ISBN 978-1-4724-7597-8.
