= Harold Danckwerts =

British lawyer and judge (1888–1978)

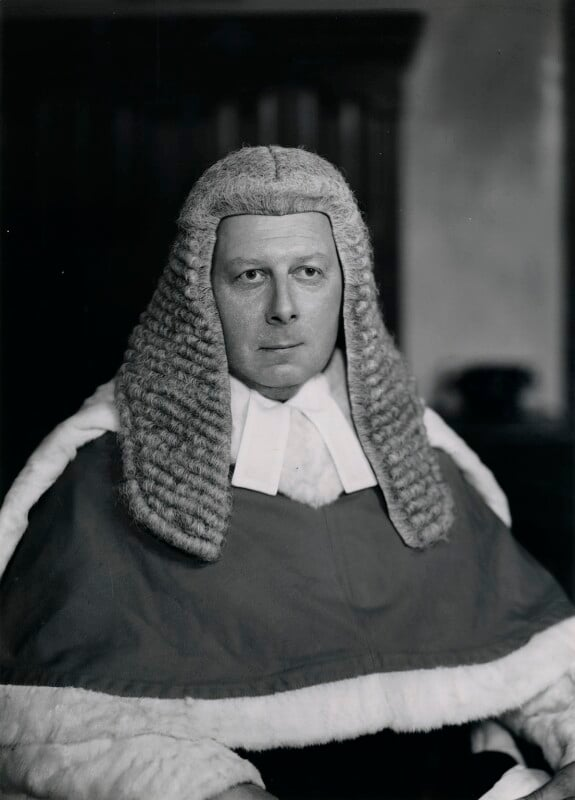
Danckwerts in 1949

Sir Harold Otto Danckwerts PC (23 February 1888 – 12 June 1978) was a British judge.

== Career ==
One of three sons and one daughter of William Otto Adolph Julius Danckwerts (German, but raised in South Africa and naturalised British) and Mary Caroline Lowther, Danckwerts was educated at Winchester College, Balliol College, Oxford, and Harvard University. He was called to the bar by Lincoln's Inn in 1913. In World War I he served with the East Riding of Yorkshire Yeomanry and the Machine Gun Corps, achieving the rank of Captain, and was mentioned in despatches.

He was appointed a Justice of the Chancery Division of the High Court of England and Wales on 1 June 1949 and received the customary knighthood shortly after. He was promoted to be a Lord Justice of Appeal in the Court of Appeal of England and Wales on 9 January 1961. Following that he was made a member of the Privy Council of the United Kingdom (principally entitling him to the prefix of Rt. Hon. and to sit in its overseas-remitted judicial final appeal hearings). He retired from his judicial offices on 2 June 1969.

== Personal life ==
His first marriage was in East Yorkshire in 1918; his second in London in 1969. His part-time residence was 4 Stone Buildings, Lincoln's Inn, and his probate was sworn in his year of death at £9,526 (equivalent to about £50,000 in 2025).
