= List of British racecourses =

This List of British racecourses gives details of both current and former horse racing venues in Great Britain. As of 19 November 2026, there are 59 racecourses operating in Great Britain (excluding Point-to-Point courses). Hereford racecourse reopened in October 2016 having been closed since 2012. Towcester racecourse is not currently operating as a horse racing venue but racing is due to resume in October 2027.

== Current ==
Northern Ireland's racecourses	South East England's racecourses
Scotland's racecourses	South East England's racecourses
Wales and rest of England's racecourses

The following British horse racing courses are in operation as of 19 November 2026:

Racecourse	County	Country	Code	Opened	Surface	Owner
Aintree	Merseyside	England	National Hunt	1829	Turf	Jockey Club
Ascot	Berkshire	England	Mixed	1711	Turf	Independent
Ayr	Ayrshire	Scotland	Mixed	1907	Turf	Independent
Bangor-on-Dee	Clwyd	Wales	National Hunt	1859	Turf	Chester Race Company
Bath	Somerset	England	Flat	by 1728	Turf	Arena Racing
Beverley	East Riding of Yorkshire	England	Flat	by 1767	Turf	Independent
Brighton	East Sussex	England	Flat	1783	Turf	Arena Racing
Carlisle	Cumbria	England	Mixed	1904	Turf	Jockey Club
Cartmel	Cumbria	England	National Hunt	by 1856	Turf	Independent
Catterick	North Yorkshire	England	Mixed	1783	Turf	Independent
Chelmsford City	Essex	England	Flat	2008	Polytrack	Independent
Cheltenham	Gloucestershire	England	National Hunt	1831	Turf	Jockey Club
Chepstow	Gwent	Wales	Mixed	1926	Turf	Arena Racing
Chester	Cheshire	England	Flat	1539	Turf	Chester Race Company
Doncaster	South Yorkshire	England	Mixed	by 1595	Turf	Arena Racing
Epsom Downs	Surrey	England	Flat	by 1661	Turf	Jockey Club
Exeter	Devon	England	National Hunt	by 1804	Turf	Jockey Club
Fakenham	Norfolk	England	National Hunt	1905	Turf	Independent
Ffos Las	Dyfed	Wales	Mixed	2009	Turf	Arena Racing
Fontwell Park	West Sussex	England	National Hunt	1924	Turf	Arena Racing
Goodwood	West Sussex	England	Flat	1802	Turf	Independent
Great Yarmouth	Norfolk	England	Flat	1810	Turf	Arena Racing
Hamilton Park	Lanarkshire	Scotland	Flat	1782	Turf	Independent
Haydock Park	Merseyside	England	Mixed	1899	Turf	Jockey Club
Hereford	Herefordshire	England	National Hunt	1771	Turf	Herefordshire Council
Hexham	Northumberland	England	National Hunt	c.1740	Turf	Independent
Huntingdon	Cambridgeshire	England	National Hunt	1886	Turf	Jockey Club
Kelso	Roxburgh, Ettrick and Lauderdale	Scotland	National Hunt	1822	Turf	Independent
Kempton Park	Surrey	England	Mixed	1878	Turf & Polytrack	Jockey Club
Leicester	Leicestershire	England	Mixed	1883	Turf	Independent
Lingfield Park	Surrey	England	Mixed	1890	Turf & Polytrack	Arena Racing
Ludlow	Shropshire	England	National Hunt	by 1725	Turf	Independent
Market Rasen	Lincolnshire	England	National Hunt	1924	Turf	Jockey Club
Musselburgh	East Lothian	Scotland	Mixed	1816	Turf	Musselburgh Joint Racing Committee
Newbury	Berkshire	England	Mixed	1905	Turf	Independent
Newcastle	Tyne and Wear	England	Mixed	1882	Turf & Tapeta	Arena Racing
Newmarket (Note: Newmarket has two courses, the July Course and the Rowley Mile. Part of the racing surface is shared but each course has its own finish and spectator facilities.)	Suffolk	England	Flat	1667	Turf	Jockey Club
Newton Abbot	Devon	England	National Hunt	1866	Turf	Independent
Nottingham	Nottinghamshire	England	Flat	1892	Turf	Jockey Club
Perth	Perth and Kinross	Scotland	National Hunt	1908	Turf	Independent
Plumpton	East Sussex	England	National Hunt	1884	Turf	Independent
Pontefract	West Yorkshire	England	Flat	1801	Turf	Independent
Redcar	North Yorkshire	England	Flat	1870	Turf	Independent
Ripon	North Yorkshire	England	Flat	1900	Turf	Independent
Salisbury	Wiltshire	England	Flat	1584	Turf	Independent
Sandown Park	Surrey	England	Mixed	1875	Turf	Jockey Club
Sedgefield	County Durham	England	National Hunt	by 1732	Turf	Arena Racing
Southwell	Nottinghamshire	England	Mixed	1850	Turf & Tapeta	Arena Racing
Stratford	Warwickshire	England	National Hunt	1755	Turf	Independent
Taunton	Somerset	England	National Hunt	1927	Turf	Independent
Thirsk	North Yorkshire	England	Flat	1923	Turf	Independent
Uttoxeter	Staffordshire	England	National Hunt	1907	Turf	Arena Racing
Warwick	Warwickshire	England	National Hunt	1707	Turf	Jockey Club
Wetherby	West Yorkshire	England	Mixed	1891	Turf	Independent
Wincanton	Somerset	England	National Hunt	1867	Turf	Jockey Club
Windsor	Berkshire	England	Mixed	1866	Turf	Arena Racing
Wolverhampton	West Midlands	England	Flat	1887	Tapeta	Arena Racing
Worcester	Worcestershire	England	National Hunt	by 1718	Turf	Arena Racing
York	North Yorkshire	England	Flat	1709	Turf	Independent

== Former ==
Through the centuries, racing has taken place at various courses throughout Britain which have since closed down. Some were very significant in their day and held major races which persist to this day. For example, the flat season's traditional curtain raiser, the Lincolnshire Handicap was once held at the racecourse that gave it its name in Lincoln but is now held at Doncaster.

=== 21st century ===
Two racecourses have closed in the 21st century. Closed date refers to the last date on which racing took place at the venue.

Racecourse	Location	Country	Code	Opened	Closed	Notes
Folkestone	Kent	England	Mixed	1898	18 December 2012	
Towcester	Northamptonshire	(England)	National Hunt	1928	2018	Greyhound racing still takes place at the course. Horse racing due to resume in October 2027.

=== 20th century ===
Between 1900 and 1981, 98 racecourses closed their doors. Opened and closed dates refer to the first and last dates on which racing took place at the venue.

Racecourse	Location	Country	Code	Opened	Closed	Notes
Aldershot Racecourse	Hampshire	England			13 April 1927	Staged military racing from 1928 to 1939 and point-to-point racing from 1948 to 2012. Also known as Tweseldown Racecourse.
Alexandra Park Racecourse	North London	England	Flat	30 June 1868	8 Sep 1970	
Anglesey Racecourse	Anglesey	Wales	National Hunt	1757	4 November 1903	Located first in Llangefni, then moved to Beaumaris
Atherstone Racecourse	Warwickshire	England	National Hunt	1905	24 March 1909	
Banbury Racecourse	Oxfordshire	England	National Hunt		24 April 1929	
Blackpool Racecourse	Lancashire	England	National Hunt	1 August 1911	27 April 1915	Also known as Clifton Park Racecourse, now the site of Blackpool Airport
Bogside Racecourse	Ayrshire	Scotland	Mixed	7 June 1808	10 April 1965	Staged point-to-point racing until March 1994
Bournemouth Racecourse	Hampshire	England	National Hunt	17 April 1925	11 April 1928	Also known as Ensbury Park Racecourse
Brocklesby Hunt Racecourse	Lincolnshire	England	National Hunt		6 April 1935	Bona fide Hunt meetings were staged from 1937 to 1939
Bromford Bridge Racecourse	Birmingham	England	Mixed	14 June 1895	21 June 1965	
Buckfastleigh Racecourse	Devon	England		21 June 1883	27 August 1960	The dilapidated main grandstand survives, and is a well known local landmark, and the fields around it are still in use for point-to-point races.
Cardiff Racecourse	Glamorgan	Wales	National Hunt	30 May 1855	27 April 1939	Also known as Ely Racecourse. Staged Flat racing in the 19th century
Chelmsford Racecourse	Essex	England	National Hunt	Bef. 1840	29 April 1935	An oval course, just under 2 miles in circumference
Colwall Park Racecourse	Worcestershire	England	National Hunt	10 May 1900	25 May 1939	Pony racing took place in 1949 and point-to-point racing was staged between 1960 and 1963
Croxton Park Racecourse	Leicestershire	England	Mixed	Bef. 1821	2 April 1914	Only Flat and hurdle races were run
Derby Racecourse	Derbyshire	England		by 1707	9 August 1939	Three different venues, the last of which opened in 1848. Still open parkland known as the Racecourse Playing Fields. The County Cricket Ground, located within the track, is still in use.
Durham Racecourse	County Durham	England		Bef. 1840		Held three day meeting at beginning of May
Eglinton Racecourse	County Londonderry	Northern Ireland				
Eridge Racecourse	Sussex	England	National Hunt	26 April 1886	17 April 1911	At Eridge Park. Hosted military racing from 1921 to 1948 and point-to-point racing from 1947 to 1952.
Gatwick Racecourse	Sussex	England	Mixed	7 October 1891	28 March 1940	The land is now part of Gatwick Airport.
Grafton Hunt Racecourse	Northamptonshire	England			1928	
Hambleton Racecourse	Yorkshire	England			1911	
Harpenden Racecourse	Hertfordshire	England	Flat	21 June 1848	7 May 1914	The land is now the site of Bamville Cricket Club.
Hawthorn Hill Racecourse	Berkshire	England	National Hunt	16 April 1888	4 April 1939	Used for Household Brigade racing. The course staged pony racing from 1947 to 1951 and in 1961, and Arab racing in 1979
Hethersett Racecourse	Norfolk	England	National Hunt	c1888	4 May 1939	The course staged point-to-racing from 1953 to 1970
Hooton Park Racecourse	Cheshire	England	National Hunt	22 May 1899	17 April 1915	Subsequently the site of RAF Hooton Park and Vauxhall Ellesmere Port
Hull Racecourse	East Riding of Yorkshire	England		1883	11 September 1909	Also known as Hedon Racecourse
Hurst Park Racecourse	Surrey	England	Mixed	19 March 1890	10 October 1962	
Ipswich Racecourse	Suffolk	England	Mixed	1710	29 March 1911	In 1840 it was holding a two-day meeting in early July, highlights of which were a 100 guineas Queen's Plate (dating from at least 1727) and a Town Members' Plate for 50 sovereigns
Keele Park Racecourse	Staffordshire	England	National Hunt	16 May 1895	18 October 1906	Now the site of Keele services
Lanark Racecourse	Lanarkshire	Scotland	Flat	c. 1100s	18 October 1977	
Lewes racecourse	East Sussex	England	Flat	Bef. 1727	14 September 1964	Situated on the chalk downs near the town, it was also home to the East Sussex Hunt. Held a Royal Plate Race for 6 year olds from 1727 at the latest. A stand was erected in 1772. In 1840, the course was "one of the finest four mile courses in the kingdom". Races took place in mid-August.
Lichfield Racecourse	Staffordshire	England				
Lincoln Racecourse	Lincolnshire	England	Flat	1773	21 May 1964	Used for point-to-point races from 1967 to 1991
Maghull Racecourse	Lancashire	England				
Manchester Racecourse	Lancashire	England	Mixed	1681	7 November 1963	There was racing at three successive sites in Manchester, the last being at Castle Irwell. Various plans to create a new racecourse on rural land such as Kersal Moor have been put forward in recent years.
Melton Racecourse	Leicestershire	England	National Hunt		27 March 1939	Located at Burton Lazars
Newport Racecourse	Monmouthshire	(Wales)	National Hunt	Bef. 1845	17 May 1948	Also known as Caerleon Racecourse
Northampton Racecourse	Northampton	England		Bef. 1840	31 March 1904	A one and a half mile oval, with a straight half mile run in. In 1840 was holding a two-day meeting at the end of August.
Northolt Park Racecourse	Middlesex	England	Pony racing	4 May 1929	June 1940	
Pershore Racecourse	Worcestershire	England	National Hunt	6 October 1847	1 May 1939	Staged one Flat meeting in 1847 and National Hunt racing from 1899 to 1939
Plymouth Racecourse	Devon	England		c. 1827	4 September 1930	A spring meeting was held in May, and a grand two-day meeting in August
Portsmouth Racecourse at Farlington	Hampshire	England	Mixed	21 June 1891	17 April 1915	Closed during World War I and turned into an ammunition dump for the War Office.Also known as Portsmouth Park Racecourse.
Portsmouth Racecourse at Paulsgrove	Hampshire	England	Pony racing	1920s	23 August 1939	Also known as Wymering Park.The land was redeveloped as a housing estate.
Rothbury Racecourse	Northumberland	England		Bef. 1759	10 April 1965	Held one meeting a year.
Rugby Racecourse at Clifton-upon-Dunsmore	Warwickshire	England	National Hunt	1862	18 March 1936	Still used annually for point-to-point races
Seamer Moor	North Yorkshire	England		28 August 1868	18 May 1907	Used for point-to-point races until 1935
Shincliffe Racecourse	Durham	England	National Hunt	15 May 1895	6 May 1914	
Shirley Racecourse	Warwickshire	England	National Hunt	1 May 1899	11 March 1940	Staged pony racing from 1947 to 1953. The land is now the home of Shirley Golf Club
South Brent Racecourse	Devon	England	National Hunt	4 June 1889	25 May 1912	
Southend Racecourse	Essex	England			1931	
South Wold Racecourse	Lincolnshire	England	National Hunt		1 April 1909	At Brackenborough, near Louth. Racing also took place at Horncastle from 1892 to 1903.
Stockton Racecourse	Durham	England		Sep 1855	16 June 1981	This was the third course in Stockton. The first dated from 1724. Known as Teesside Park from 1967 to 1979
Tenby Racecourse	Pembrokeshire	Wales	National Hunt	25 August 1847	29 October 1936	
Torquay Racecourse	Devon	England	National Hunt	1890	25 March 1940	At Petitor. Racing took place at other venues from 1854
Totnes Racecourse	Devon	England	National Hunt	Bef. 1799	1 September 1938	The scheduled 1939 meeting was cancelled due to the outbreak of war. Requisitioned by the Admiralty, it was sold in the early 1950s. At this course long distance steeplechases involved crossing the River Dart and the Totnes-Newton Abbot road. Sometimes called the Totnes and Bridgetown races
Whitehaven Racecourse	Cumberland	England		1852		
Wrexham Racecourse	Denbighshire	Wales				In 1840, it was holding a two-day October meeting which included a 100 sovereign Gold Cup
Woore Racecourse	Shropshire	England	National Hunt	1885	1 June 1963	
Wye Racecourse	Kent	England	National Hunt	29 May 1849	2 May 1974	

=== 19th century ===
Many courses that were prominent in earlier times did not survive into the modern era. The list below is a selection of these, taken from Whyte's History of the British Turf. Where dates are not given for closure, it is possible they were still extant in the 20th century. No distinction has been made between enclosed courses of the type that are familiar now and those that were run over unenclosed courses, more akin to point-to-point racing. Indeed, some of these racecourses or parts of them are still used for that purpose.

Racecourse	Location	Country	Code	Opened	Closed	Notes
Aberystwyth Racecourse	Cardiganshire	Wales		not known	not known	A mid-August meeting was well and fashionably attended on a meadow near Gogerddan about three miles from the town.
Abingdon Racecourse	Berkshire	England		1767	1875	Early records show that racing took place at Abingdon as early as 1767.The flat, oval racecourse had a circumference of 10 furlongs and a separate 6 furlong section for sprint races.
Ashford Racecourse	Kent	England		not known	not known	Held a one-day meeting in September, with a £50 town plate being the principal race
Bedford Racecourse	Bedfordshire	England		not known	not known	Two annual meetings recorded in 1840
Belford Racecourse	Northumberland	England		not known	not known	Run at a course one mile south-west of the town, on the site of what is supposed to have been a Danish camp. Formerly at Beadnell.
Bibury Racecourse	Gloucestershire	England		not known	not known	
Bicester Racecourse	Oxfordshire	England		not known	not known	Held a day-long meeting at the end of September, including a Town Plate of £50
Birmingham Racecourse	Warwickshire	England		not known	not known	Held a 'poorly-attended' two-day meeting in early October
Bishop's Castle Racecourse	Shropshire	England		not known	not known	Near Ludlow, it held a day's 'inferior' racing in mid-July
Blandford Racecourse	Dorset	England		not known	not known	Held a meeting towards the end of August which included the 100 sovereign Dorsetshire Gold Cup
Bodmin Racecourse	Cornwall	England		not known	not known	Held one day's racing in September
Brecknock Racecourse	Brecknockshire	Wales		not known	not known	A course near the town, with a 'commodious' stand held races for two days in late September
Brenwood Racecourse	Staffordshire	England		not known	not known	Held two days' racing at the end of September
Bridgenorth Racecourse	Shropshire	England		not known	not known	Held a two-day meeting at the start of August; the course was in bad repair in 1840
Bromyard Racecourse	Herefordshire	England		not known	not known	Held a day long race meeting in mid-August
Burnley Racecourse	Lancashire	England		not known	not known	Held two days' racing in the middle of August, including a Gold Cup of 100 sovs
Burntwood Racecourse	Staffordshire	England		1838	16 October 1839	Held one day's racing in mid-October. Held the 'Ordinaries' at The Star Inn, Burntwood.
Burton-upon-Trent Racecourse	Staffordshire	England		From 'a very early period'	not known	Held a two-day meeting at the end of August which included the Bretby Cup, given by the Earl of Chesterfield
Burton Constable Racecourse	Worcestershire	England		not known	not known	A small hunter racecourse
Buxton Racecourse	Derbyshire	England		not known	not known	Held two days' racing in June
Canterbury Racecourse	Kent	England		not known	not known	Held on Barham Downs, within 3 miles of the city. Had a 'commodious stand'. Was awarded a King's Plate by George II in 1729.
Cardiff Racecourse	Glamorganshire	Wales		not known	not known	Held mid-July meetings for two days.
Cheadle Racecourse	Staffordshire	England		not known	not known	Held one day's 'inferior racing' at the beginning of September
Chesterfield Racecourse	Derbyshire	England		1868	11 October 1877	Held two days' racing at the start of October
Clifton and Bristol Racecourse	Gloucestershire	England		not known	not known	Held two days' racing at the beginning of May
Clitheroe Racecourse	Lancashire	England		1821	not known	The first record of racing was 1617 http://www.greyhoundderby.com/Clitheroe%20Racecourse.html the link has a map too.
Coventry Racecourse	Warwickshire	England		not known	not known	Two-day race meetings were held in March with a Silver Cup and £100 in prize money
Croxton Park Racecourse	Leicestershire	England		not known	not known	Held amateur races at the beginning of April
Croydon Racecourse	Surrey	England		1871	not known	Site now occupied by Long Lane Estate and Ashburton Playing Fields.
Dorchester Racecourse	Dorset	England		not known	not known	Held two days' racing in the middle of September
Dove House Races at Harrow-on-the-Hill	Middlesex	England		1836	not known	Held in mid-August
Dudley Racecourse	Worcestershire	England		not known	not known	Held two days racing at the end of June
Dumfries Racecourse	Dumfriesshire	Scotland		not known	not known	Alternately held the Caledonian Hunt meeting, along with Ayr, Edinburgh and Musselburgh
Egham Racecourse	Surrey	England		not known	not known	Situated on the plain of Runnymede where King John signed Magna Carta, Egham races were often attended by royalty. The course was a two mile flat oval.
Eglistoun Park	Ayrshire	Scotland		not known	not known	
Enfield and Pinner Races	Middlesex	England		not known	By 1836	Replaced by Dove House meeting
Gloucester Racecourse	Gloucestershire	England		not known	not known	A mile and a half oblong course in a meadow on the banks of the River Severn, with a straight, 400 yard run-in
Gorhambury Park Racecourse	Hertfordshire	England		1838	not known	Had four courses ranging in length from 5 furlongs 136 yards to two miles
Great Marlow Racecourse	Buckinghamshire	England		not known	not known	
Hampton Racecourse	Middlesex	England		not known	not known	Three-day meetings held in the middle of June on Moulsey Hurst next to the river
Hastings and St. Leonards Racecourse	Sussex	England		1827	not known	Held a two-day meeting at the end of September which included the Town Plate and St. Leonard's Plate, both of 50 sovereigns
Haverfordwest Racecourse	Pembrokeshire	Wales		not known	not known	Situated on a common near the town called Portfield or Poorfield. Two-day meetings were held at the beginning of August.
Heaton Park Racecourse	Lancashire	England		not known	not known	Held three days 'excellent' racing in late September
Hednesford Racecourse	Staffordshire	England		1835	Monday 30 October 1871	Races were held on the 'heathy downs' at Cannock Chase which had long been famed for racehorses. A day long meeting was held in early July and again in October and November. These races did not run from 1835 to 1871 consecutively. The first meeting was on Tuesday 27 October 1835 and ran for seven years until Tuesday 8 November 1842. Another meeting was held on Tuesday 26 November 1850 with the final meeting being on Monday 30 October 1871.
Hertford Racecourse	Hertfordshire	England		not known	not known	Races took place at the beginning of August for two days
Hippodrome Racecourse, Bayswater, London	Middlesex	England		3 June 1837	not known	A 'vast establishment' also called the Metropolitan Racecourse
Holywell Racecourse	Flintshire	Wales		9 November 1769	20 October 1852	Hunt races took place in the middle of October for two days.
The Hoo Racecourse	Hertfordshire	England		1821	not known	Racing, mainly hunter chases, took place at the end of April and for a short time in the 1820s and 1830s the course was very fashionable
Kingston Racecourse [sic] (Kington)	Herefordshire	England		not known	not known	An 'inferior' racecourse, with meetings at the end of July
Knighton Racecourse	Pembrokeshire	Wales		not known	not known	Held two-day race meetings in mid-June.
Lancaster Racecourse	Lancashire	England		not known	not known	Held a two-day meeting in late July
Lee Racecourse	Kent	England		not known	not known	Held races that were only 'of local interest' in 1840
Leith Races	Lothian	Scotland		1504 (or earlier)	1816	Races were held on the sands at low tide in late July or early August for four or five days, until the events were moved to Musselburgh. A 4 mile King's Plate was run at Leith from at least 1728
Lenham Racecourse	Kent	England		13 September 1848	Friday 29 June 1860	First held a one day race meeting: The Lenham and Mid Kent meeting, in 1848 on a course of barely 6 furlongs circumference. The final meeting took place on Friday 29 June 1860.
Leominster Racecourse	Herefordshire	England		not known	not known	Held meetings at the end of August
Lichfield Racecourse	Staffordshire	England		not known	not known	The course was on the Tamworth road, about two miles from the city and raced at the end of March and in mid-September. Was awarded a King's Plate for 5 year olds by George II in 1748.
Mansfield Racecourse	Nottinghamshire	England		21 August 1734	13 July 1874	The course was situated just over a mile east of the town, the area between the straights (which crossed both Eakring Road and Southwell Road) is still used for recreational purposes.
Market Weighton Racecourse	North Yorkshire	England		6 March 1857	14 March 1859	A four mile course on Selby High Road.
Middleham Racecourse	North Yorkshire	England		not known	not known	Races were held annually in November on Middleham Moor, but in 1840 they were deemed 'of little interest'. Middleham is still home to many racing stables.
Monmouth Racecourse	Monmouthshire	Wales		not known	not known	Situated on the banks of the River Wye near the junction with the River Monnow on Chippenham meadow. A two-day meeting was held in mid-October.
Morpeth Racecourse	Northumberland	England		not known	not known	Races took place over two days at the beginning of September at Cottingwood to the north of the town.
Newcastle-under-Lyme Racecourse	Shropshire	England	Mixed	not known	not known	Held a two-day meeting in early August
Newport Racecourse	Shropshire	England	Mixed	not known	not known	Held a two-day meeting at the end of July
Newport Paynel [sic] Racecourse	Buckinghamshire	England		not known	By 1840	
Northallerton Racecourse	North Riding of Yorkshire	England	Mixed	not known	not known	Racing took place in mid-October for two days, and included a £100 Gold Cup and £50 Silver Cup.
Oswestry Race Course	Shropshire	England		early 1700s or 1804	1848	Racing started on the common west of the town over a unique figure-of-eight course. A grandstand was built at the start of the 19th century. but the last meeting was held in 1848. Its regular meeting was two days in September and included the Shropshire Stakes and a Gold Cup.
Oxford Racecourse	Oxfordshire	England		not known	not known	An oval of two miles, quite flat
Pontypool Racecourse	Monmouthshire	Wales		not known	not known	Situated between the River Avon and the canal to Newport, Wales. A two-day meeting was held at the start of August.
The Potteries Racecourse	Staffordshire	England		not known	not known	Held a two-day meeting at the start of August including a Stewards' Plate of 100 sovs.
Richmond Racecourse	Yorkshire	England	Mixed	not known	not known	Racing took place for two days in mid-September on Whitcliffe Meadow, an area of common ground, which was "an excellent course". The link below provides a wonderfully detailed description of the course and plans to transform it into a conservation area:- https://www.richmondshire.gov.uk/media/4936/richmond-racecourse-conservation-area-study.pdf
Rochester and Chatham Racecourse	Kent	England		not known	not known	Held a two-day meeting at the beginning of September
Royston Racecourse	Hertfordshire	England		not known	not known	Held a one day meeting in the middle of May, for 'half-bred horses' of local interest only
Shiffnal Racecourse	Shropshire	England		not known	not known	Held two days of 'inferior racing' at the end of May
Shrewsbury Racecourse	Shropshire	England		1730	5 November 1886	Situated on Bicton Heath, 2 miles west of Shrewsbury. It was 1 mile 185 yards round. Races took place in mid-September for 3 or 4 days and included a Queen's Plate of 100gs. In Chris Pitt's book, A Long Time Gone, he states the meetings began in 1774 but there is evidence on John Slusar's website, The Greyhound Derby, that shows it was 1730.
Southampton Racecourse	Hampshire	England		31 July 1804	28 June 1881	Situated on Southampton common on land given by the corporation. Held a two-day meeting at the beginning of August.
Stafford Racecourse	Staffordshire	England		not known	not known	A one mile course, almost completely oval except for a quarter mile straight run-in. Held 'very inferior' races at the start of October.
Stamford Racecourse	Lincolnshire	England		not known	not known	A mile in circumference on Wittering Heath near the town, held a three day mid-June meeting. The grandstand of 1766 survives
Staverton Racecourse	Wiltshire	England		not known	not known	A meeting of merely local interest was held at the end of April
Stockbridge Racecourse	Hampshire	England		1839	1898	Dates given are for most significant incarnation of the course. There had been racing at another site in Stockbridge from 1775 or earlier
Stone Racecourse	Staffordshire	England		not known	not known	Held a two-day meeting in early October.
Stowebridge Racecourse	Warwickshire	England		not known	not known	Held two days of racing at the end of August. Had a Cup Stakes of £100 in value.
St. Albans Racecourse	Hertfordshire	England		not known	c. 1838	Held at a place called Noman's Land. Home to the St. Albans' Steeple Chase. Racing ceased on the establishment of Gorhambury Park.
Swansea Racecourse	Glamorganshire	Wales		not known	not known	Commonly called 'Swansea and Neath races', the course was on Cremlyn Burrows on the Neath Road. Meetings were held at the end of August.
Tavistock Racecourse	Devon	England		not known	not known	An oval, hilly, two mile course with a one day meeting at the beginning of May
Tenbury Racecourse	Warwickshire	England		not known	not known	Racing of a 'very inferior' nature, with the principal race being a £50 plate.
Tiverton Racecourse	Devon	England		not known	not known	Held a two-day meeting at the end of August
Tunbridge Wells Racecourse	Kent	England		not known	not known	Held a well attended two-day meeting at the end of August on the common
Upton-upon-Severn Racecourse	Warwickshire	England		not known	not known	Races took place at the end of August
Walsall Racecourse	Staffordshire	England		1755	13 August 1876	The majority of race meetings were held over two days at the end of September although some years the meeting was held in October and towards the end, in August.
Wem Racecourse	Shropshire	England		not known	not known	Held a 'very inferior' race meeting at the beginning of October
Wenlock Racecourse	Shropshire	England		not known	not known	Held one day's racing at the end of July
Weymouth Racecourse	Dorset	England		1821	not known	Well attended meeting held at the end of August. The course was considered 'very good'
Winchester Racecourse	Hampshire	England		Bef. 1727	Circa 1914 requisitioned during WW I and remains in military ownership	Races were held on Worthy Down, 4 miles from Winchester for two days in the middle of July. Held a Royal Plate race for 6 year olds from at least 1727.

=== Numbers in the 18th-19th centuries ===
Year	England	Wales	Scotland	Ireland	Total	Notes
1727 (Note: Taken from John Cheney's Historical list of all the Horse Matches &c. of 1727, cited in Whyte's History)	112	5	unknown	unknown	117 (Note: Excludes Ireland and Scotland)	
1800	66 (Note: includes Wales)		5	4	75	
1816	84 (Note: includes Wales)		9	8	101	
1839	132	9	9	3	153	

=== 18th century ===
Whyte's History of the British Turf (1840) lists 48 places where racing was discontinued in the latter half of the 18th century:

North
- Alnwick, Northumberland
- Bedale, Yorkshire
- Bishop Auckland, Durham
- Bishop's Burton [sic], Yorkshire
- Bradford, Yorkshire
- Crabtree, Cheshire
- Egremont, Cumberland
- Follifoot, Yorkshire
- Hexam [sic], Northumberland
- Morpeth, Northumberland
  (still active in 1792 racing calendar)
- Newbig Link, Northumberland
- Northwich, Cheshire
- Ormskirk, Lancashire
- Stockton, Durham
- Selby, Yorkshire
- Stokesley, Yorkshire
- Wallesay [sic], Cheshire

Midlands

- Ashbourne, Derbyshire
- Dunstable, Bedfordshire
- Loughborough, Leicestershire
- Lowth [sic], Lincolnshire
- Newark, Nottinghamshire
- Rugby, Warwickshire
- Spalding, Lincolnshire
- Uppingham, Rutlandshire

London

- Artillery Ground, London
- Bellsize [sic], Middlesex
- Croydon, Surrey
- Hampstead, Middlesex
- Hownslow [sic], Middlesex
- Tothill Fields, Westminster

East

- Beccles, Suffolk (although this is still listed as active later on in Whyte's History)
- Hardmead, Hertfordshire
- Holt, Norfolk
- Lilly Hoo, Hertfordshire
- Odsey, Hertfordshire
- Romford, Essex
- Swaffham, Norfolk
- Wisbech, Norfolk

South

- Barnstable [sic], Devonshire
- Chipping Norton, Oxfordshire
- Islip, Oxfordshire
- Lambourn, Berkshire
- Towcester, Northamptonshire
- Woodstock, Oxfordshire

West and Wales

- Ludlow, Shropshire
- Welch Pool [sic], Wales
  (still listed as active later on in Whyte's History)

NB Racing is recorded at various of these places after 1840. There is also reference to a Royal Plate race being held at Guilford [sic] from 1727 at the latest and Burford from 1755.

=== Other sites ===
Race results from places not listed by Whyte can also be found in the historical record. These include:

- Blankney Races
- New Malton
- Radcliffe Bridge
- Tarporley Hunt
- Tewkesbury

== Bibliography ==
- Mortimer, Roger; Onslow, Richard; Willett, Peter (1978). Biographical Encyclopedia of British Flat Racing. Macdonald and Jane's. ISBN 0-354-08536-0.
- Pitt, Chris (2006). A Long Time Gone (Rev. and updated ed.). Halifax: Portway. ISBN 1901570622.
- Slusar, John (18 November 2016). "Lenham Racecourse". Greyhound Derby.
- Whyte, James Christie (1840). History of the British turf, from the earliest period to the present day, Volume I. London: H. Colburn. OL 6544990M.
