= Henry Horton (sportsman) =

English sportsman (1923–1998)

- Horton in 1958

Personal information
- Full name: Henry Horton
- Born: 18 April 1923; Colwall, Herefordshire, England
- Died: 2 November 1998 (aged 75); Birmingham, Warwickshire, England
- Nickname: H
- Batting: Right-handed
- Bowling: Slow left-arm orthodox
- Relatives: Joseph Horton (brother)

Domestic team information
- Years: Team
- 1946–1949: Worcestershire
- 1953–1967: Hampshire

Umpiring information
- FC umpired: 72 (1973–1976)
- LA umpired: 72 (1973–1976)

Career statistics
| Competition | First-class | List A |
|---|---|---|
| Matches | 417 | 13 |
| Runs scored | 21,669 | 284 |
| Batting average | 32.83 | 21.84 |
| 100s/50s | 32/122 | –/2 |
| Top score | 160* | 56 |
| Balls bowled | 348 | 0 |
| Wickets | 3 | – |
| Bowling average | 64.66 | – |
| 5 wickets in innings | – | – |
| 10 wickets in match | – | – |
| Best bowling | 2/0 | – |
| Catches/stumpings | 264/– | 3/– |
Source: Henry Horton at Cricinfo
8 November 2022
Association football career
- Position: Wing-half
Senior career*
| Years | Team | Apps | (Gls) |
| ?–1946 | Worcester City | ? | (?) |
| 1946–1951 | Blackburn Rovers | 92 | (5) |
| 1951–1954 | Southampton | 75 | (11) |
| 1954–1955 | Bradford Park Avenue | 27 | (0) |
| 1955–1960 | Hereford United | ? | (?) |
- * Club domestic league appearances and goals

Henry Horton (18 April 1923 – 2 November 1998) was an English sportsman who played both association football and cricket. As a footballer, Horton played as a wing-half, beginning his career at Worcester City. He then played in the Football League for Blackburn in 1946, before joining Southampton as their record transfer in 1951. He would later play for Bradford Park Avenue, before ending his career with Hereford United. As a first-class cricketer, he began his career as an amateur at Worcestershire, playing a few matches without success. He would later play over 400 first-class matches as a professional for Hampshire, scoring over 21,500 runs. After the end of his playing career, he had two spells as coach of Worcestershire, and stood as a first-class umpire.

== Football career ==
Horton was born in April 1923 in Colwall, Herefordshire. He served in the Second World War with the Fleet Air Arm and was demobilised following the conclusion of the war in 1945. As a sportsman, he initially excelled as a footballer who played at wing-half. After playing for Worcester City, Horton joined First Division Blackburn Rovers for £2,000 in 1946. Blackburn were relegated to the Second Division during the 1947–48 season, where they were to remain for rest of Horton's time with the club. Writing in The Independent, Derek Hodgson described him as an "obdurate, intransigent" defender. Horton left Blackburn at the end of the 1950–51 season, having made 92 appearances and scored five goals for the club.

He joined fellow Second Division side Southampton ahead of the 1951–52 season, for their then club record fee of £10,000. He played for Southampton mostly as a defender, but on occasion he played as a forward. He missed two months of the 1952–53 season from September to December, having fractured his jaw against Rotherham United. His most notable goal for Southampton came as a defender against Blackpool at Bloomfield Road in the Fifth Round of the 1952–53 FA Cup, when Southampton were trailing 1–0. Having won a free kick on the edge of the Blackpool box in the 86th minute, Horton went forward and headed in Peter Sillett's free kick. He played for Southampton until the 1953–54 season, having made 75 league appearances and scoring 11 goals, and was club captain in the 1952–53 and 1953–54 seasons.

At the end of that season, which had been blighted by injury, he was placed on Southampton's transfer list. He subsequently attracted attention from Joe Mallett at Leyton Orient and Norman Kirkman at Bradford Park Avenue, both former Southampton players in managerial positions. He chose to joined Bradford Park Avenue, which Horton later lamented was a "silly" preference. He played just one season for Bradford Park Avenue, making 27 appearances. For the 1955–56 season, he played for Hereford United in the Southern Football League, remaining with the club until he retired before the beginning of the 1960–61 season.

== Cricket career ==
=== Worcestershire ===
Horton began playing at first-class level as an amateur middle order batsman and occasional slow left-arm orthodox bowler for Worcestershire, making his first-class debut against the Royal Air Force at Worcester in 1946. In that season, he made his County Championship debut against Warwickshire at Edgbaston. In this match, his teammate Dick Howorth implored Warwickshire bowler Jack Marshall to allow him an easy delivery to score his first run from. Marshall bowled a slow half-volley, which Horton missed to be bowled for a duck. He played more extensively in 1947, making seven first-class appearances; thereafter, he played just one match apiece in 1948 and 1949. He did not have success during his four seasons on the Worcestershire staff, scoring 129 runs from eleven first-class matches at an average of 8.06. Alongside Leonard Blunt, Syd Buller, and Norman Whiting, he was not re-engaged by Worcestershire following the 1949 season. After his first foray into first-class cricket, Horton had seemingly given up playing the game.

=== Hampshire ===
Horton came late to full-time cricket, having spent most of his twenties concentrating on his football career. While playing a cricket match for Southampton F.C. against Portsmouth at the County Ground, he scored a century and came to the attention of Hampshire coach and ex-Southampton player Arthur Holt. Under Holt's encouragement, he was persuaded to appear for Hampshire Club and Ground in 1952, making two centuries. Following his unsuccessful spell with Worcestershire, Horton initially wanted to play cricket just for "fun", but asked to represent Hampshire in a minor match against the British Army team and made 99 runs. He signed professional terms for Hampshire in February 1953, making his senior first eleven debut against Leicestershire at Portsmouth in the 1953 County Championship. Horton featured for Hampshire in fourteen first-class matches in 1953, including against the touring Australians, and twice passed fifty runs in an innings. The following season he again featured in fourteen first-class matches, passing fifty runs on five occasions and made his highest first-class score, with 82 runs against Oxford University.

With the end of his Football League career in 1955, Horton established himself in the Hampshire eleven. Coming into bat at number three behind the opening pair of the West Indian Roy Marshall, who had just qualified to play for Hampshire, and the all-rounder Jimmy Gray, he made 23 appearances during the 1955 season. In his first full season, he passed a thousand runs in the season, scoring 1,231 at an average of 31.56; he recorded his maiden first-class century at Bournemouth against Leicestershire, scoring 139 runs and in the process being awarded his county cap. Horton scored two further centuries during the season. The following season, he made 31 appearances and scored 1,396 runs at an average of 31.02. Although he did not record a century in 1956, he did make thirteen half centuries. After passing a thousand runs for the season in both 1957 and 1958, Horton scored 2,000 runs in a season for the first time in 1959, with 2,428 runs at an average of 47.60, whilst making four centuries; this was to be his most successful season in first-class cricket. His aggregate of runs in 1959 is the sixth highest in Hampshire's history, beaten only by Phil Mead (four times) and once by Roy Marshall.

Having success during the 1960 season, in which Horton scored 2,170 runs at an average of 43.40 and made seven centuries, he was selected to represent the Players in the Gentlemen v Players fixture at Lord's; however, he was not successful in the match. He would play an important role the following season as Hampshire won their first County Championship, proving a reliable run-getter throughout the season. Appearing in 33 County Championship matches during the season, he scored 2,329 runs at an average of 38.18. Amongst his four centuries in 1961 was an unbeaten 160 against Yorkshire at Scarborough, which was to be his highest first-class score. In 1962, he narrowly missed out on scoring 2,000 runs in a season for the fourth consecutive season. He would pass a thousand runs in each season until 1966, having passed the landmark for twelve consecutive seasons. Horton was a member of Hampshire's team for their inaugural appearance in List A one-day cricket against Derbyshire in the 1963 Gillette Cup. He played thirteen one-day matches for Hampshire, with his final appearance in the format coming in the 1967 Gillette Cup. Horton was granted a benefit season in 1964. His final season with Hampshire came in 1967, with him being released in September in order to take up the role of head–coach at Worcestershire.

=== Playing style and statistics ===
Horton was essentially a defensive player, contrasting with the flamboyance of Marshall in the Hampshire side. The Independent likened him to a "passable imitation of a brick wall", such was the soundness of his defence. His captain, Colin Ingleby-Mackenzie, remarked that he rarely got out of first gear. Horton was a right-handed batsman with a curious and ungainly crouching stance, once described as if he was squatting on the loo. In light of Hampshire's erratic batting order, his patience and consistency was described as "gold dust". He was particularly effective against fast bowling. In 405 first-class matches for Hampshire, he scored 21,536 runs at an average of 33.49, making 32 centuries and 122 half centuries. As of 2026, he is Hampshire's sixth-highest run-scorer in first-class cricket. Horton was a strong fielder at short-leg, with him taking 264 catches during his first-class career. In thirteen one-day matches, he scored 284 runs at an average of 21.84, making two half centuries.

=== Umpiring and coaching ===
After retiring from playing football, Horton spent the winter months whilst still engaged by Hampshire as a games' master at a private school in Colwall. He was appointed Worcestershire coach for the 1968 season, a role he held until his resignation following the 1972 season. He was subsequently added to the first-class umpires list by the Test and County Cricket Board for the 1973 season, alongside Barrie Meyer. Horton stood as an umpire until the 1976 season, standing in 72 first-class and one-day matches apiece. He was not reappointed to the first-class umpires list ahead of the 1977 season, and in July 1977 he returned to coach Worcestershire. His second spell lasted until 1979, when he was replaced by Basil D'Oliveira. Horton remained with Worcestershire to assist D'Oliveria in recruiting young players for the county. He was later employed as the groundsman at the Royal Grammar School Worcester.

== Death and family ==
Horton retired back to Herefordshire, where he lived with his sisters in their home town. He died in Birmingham on 2 November 1998, following a short illness. Horton was never married. He was the younger brother of Joseph Horton, who played more than 60 times for Worcestershire in the 1930s and who died just four days after him.

Sporting positions
| Preceded by Sidney Martin; None | Worcestershire cricket coach 1968–1972; 1977–1979 | Succeeded by None; Basil D'Oliveira |
