= Rothbury Racecourse =

Horse racing venue in Northumberland, England

- Location: Rothbury, Northumberland
- Coordinates: 55.31°N 1.92°W
- Owned by: Defunct
- Date opened: Before 1759
- Date closed: 1965
- Notable races: Rothbury Cup

Rothbury Racecourse was a horse racing venue in Northumberland, England which closed in 1965. It was situated just outside the village of Rothbury, on a plain by the River Coquet.

The earliest recorded meeting at Rothbury took place in April 1759. It held only one meeting a year, always in April (with the exception of 1947, when it was held on 31 May because the course was flooded). Proximity to the river meant flooding was common.

The course was just under 1.5 miles in circumference, and races were held over distances from 2 to 3 miles. The course split into two separate tracks in the back straight, with the hurdle track, which was quite sharp, staying on the valley floor. The steeplechase track climbed the hillside and was substantially longer, and a sterner test of stamina. The water jump was the middle of three fences in the home straight and was bypassed on the final circuit. The course had a dramatic downhill section with a sharp left turn at the bottom into the straight which was parallel to the river. The turn led jockey Gerry Scott in the Sporting Life to describe Rothbury as his least favourite racecourse.

Horses would walk through the village to the course, and on race days, a temporary bridge would be built over the river to allow the horses and spectators across. The landlord of the Railway Hotel in the village would set up the bar tent, and locals would lend tractors to move horseboxes, since no hard standing was available at the track.

The course's principal race was the 3 mile Rothbury Cup, which was moved to Newcastle after the course's demise.

In its later years, Rothbury staged a three horse race over 3 miles. The Callant, a striking grey horse, locally owned, but well-known having featured in close finishes in big races elsewhere in the country, came close to a memorable victory in the race having fallen, and been at one point over two fences behind the others.

The course was closed during both World Wars.

Rothbury was deemed surplus to requirements by the Levy Board in the 1960s and marked for closure. The course's final meeting was on 10 April 1965, coincidentally the same day Bogside Racecourse closed, and attracted a crowd of 3,000, slightly lower than usual. The final winner was Golden Boy, ridden by John Blair.

The land on which it stood is now a golf course, and the golf club has taken over some of the old racecourse buildings.
