= Stockton Racecourse =

Former horse racing site in North Yorkshire, England

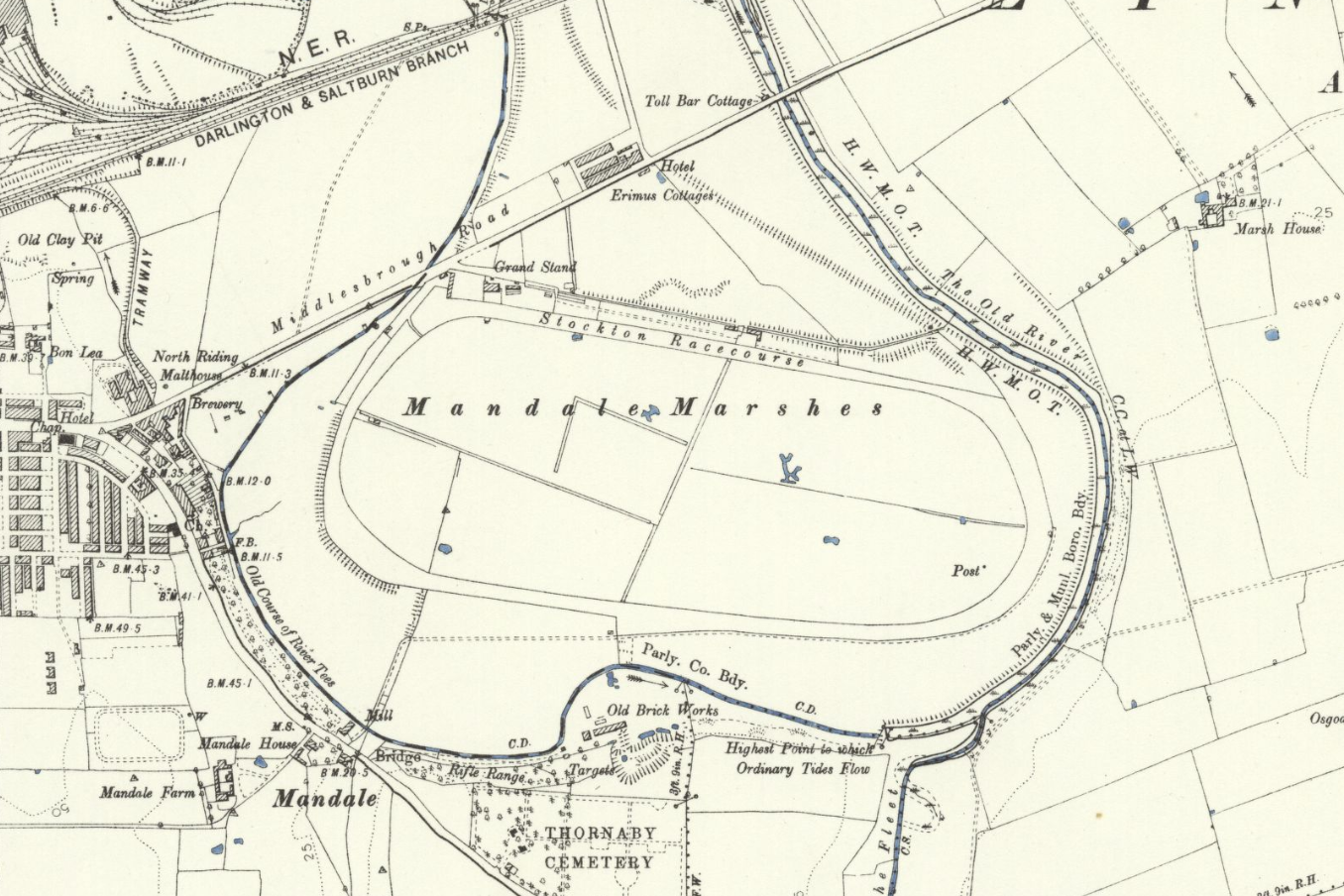
Map of Stockton Racecourse, in 1892, showing the location in a loop in the Old River Tees

Stockton Racecourse (September 1855 - 16 June 1981), also known as Teesside Park, was a British horse racing venue near Thornaby-on-Tees in the North Riding of Yorkshire England, once considered "the finest in the north".

Through the years, racing took place at three sites. The first of these was at Thornaby Carrs in the North Riding of Yorkshire, to the north of Thornaby Village where racing first took place in 1724. Racing was then discontinued for many years, before being revived in September 1855 at Mandale Marshes, situated on a loop in the River Tees. The Mandale course had two stands - the Stewards Stand and the Grand Stand. In three days racing in 1864, the attendance was 36,000.

The course at Mandale Marshes lay north of the old course of the River Tees, but south of the Mandale Cut and the Portrack Cut which had been built in the early 19th century to straighten the river. When racing began there in the 1850s, it still formed part of the parish of Stockton-on-Tees in County Durham, but was physically cut off from the rest of the parish by the new course of the river. The county boundary was adjusted to follow the straightened course of the River Tees in 1887, after which the racecourse was in Thornaby in Yorkshire.

Thornaby hosted only flat racing until the opening of the national hunt course in 1967, which was 38 yards wide and cost about £40,000. The flat course was a left-handed oval, slightly under 1 mile 6 furlongs round, with easy turns and a home straight of 4 furlongs. The starts for 5 furlong and 6 furlong races were on separate spurs. The national hunt course was just over 1 mile 4 furlongs, with 9 fences.

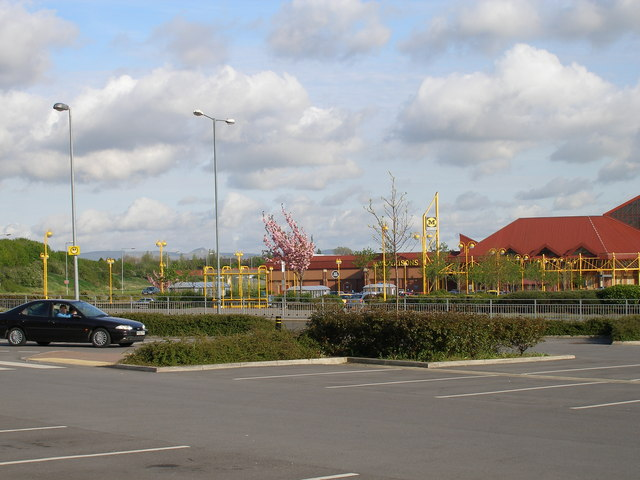
Teesside Park retail complex, built on the site of the old Stockton Racecourse

At one time, local factories closed down especially for race week. However, the course went into decline after World War II, losing out to the competing attractions of cinema and TV. It finally closed on 16 June 1981 due to falling attendances. The last winner was a horse called Suniti.

The site is now a shopping centre called Teesside Park.

== See also ==
- List of British racecourses

== Bibliography ==
- Heavisides, Henry (1865). The Annals of Stockton-on-Tees, with biographical notices. Stockton-on-Tees: Heavisides.
