= Coddington, Herefordshire =

Parish in eastern Herefordshire, England

Coordinates: 52.082°N 2.40962°W

Coddington
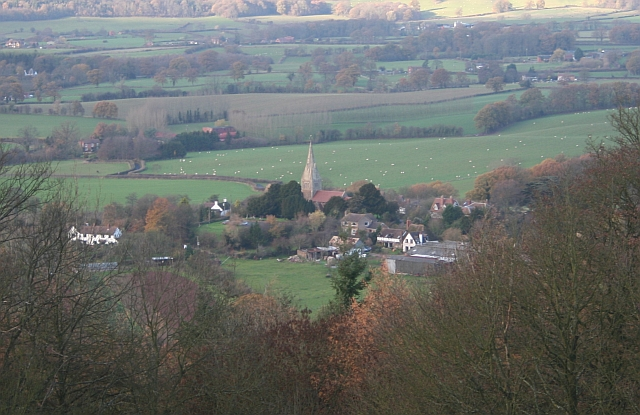
- Coddington from Oyster Hill

- Location within Herefordshire
- Population: 99
- OS grid reference: SO719427
- Civil parish: Coddington
- Unitary authority: Herefordshire
- Ceremonial county: Herefordshire
- Region: West Midlands
- Country: England
- Sovereign state: United Kingdom
- Post town: LEDBURY
- Postcode district: HR8
- Dialling code: 01531
- Police: West Mercia
- Fire: Hereford and Worcester
- Ambulance: West Midlands
- UK Parliament: North Herefordshire

Coddington is a hamlet and civil parish in eastern Herefordshire, England, about 3 miles (4.8 km) north of Ledbury. The west side of the parish covers part of the Malvern Hills, an official Area of Outstanding Natural Beauty. Coddington shares a parish council with neighbouring village of Bosbury.

== Geography ==
The parish is small in area and population, with dispersed settlements and farms. The church and the surrounding hamlet of Coddington stand on a hillock rising to 110 metres (360 ft). The highest point in the parish is Oyster Hill at 211 metres (692 ft), which has an Ordnance Survey triangulation station. Other places in the parish include Coddington Cross (at a crossroads on the main road through the parish, which does not pass through the hamlet of Coddington), Bush Farm, Pithouse Farm, Coddington Court, and Woofields Farm.

The nearest railway stations are Ledbury and Colwall, both about 3.5 miles (5.6 km) away by road. The Herefordshire Trail, a long-distance footpath, passes through the parish, calling at the vineyard, the church and Oyster Hill.

== History ==
Coddington was recorded as a manor in the Domesday Book (1086), then spelled as Cotingtune. The manor was then held by the Bishop of Hereford.

The Ordnance Survey map of 1887 shows a school and a post office in the hamlet. It also shows two public houses: the Plough Inn and the Golden Cross Inn, on the lane between Coddington Court and Coddington Cross. All these amenities have since closed.

Coddington was home to Clyde Petroleum, established in the 1970s by a group of ex-Royal Dutch Shell employees.

The parish has many listed buildings, including several black and white half-timbered dwellings, of which Bush Farm is listed Grade II*.

== Religion ==
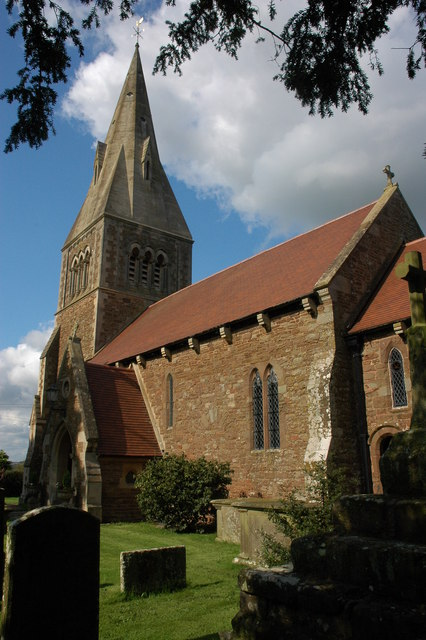
The historic All Saints’ Church

The Church of England parish church of All Saints is a Grade II* listed building built largely in the 12th and 13th centuries. It features a broach spire. Church services are shared with nearby Colwall. The churchyard includes a Grade II* listed cross, whose base dates from the 14th century.

There is a Buddhist retreat and study centre at Coddington Court.

== Demographics ==
The 2001 census gave Coddington a population of 108, and the two parishes of Bosbury and Coddington combined a population of 888. This fell by 8.5 per cent to 813 at the 2011 census, when the estimated population for Coddington was 99.

== Politics ==
Coddington (with two seats) shares a parish council with a larger neighbour, Bosbury (eleven seats). They and the parishes of Colwall and Mathon form the ward of Hope End, which elects one member to Herefordshire Council. Coddington lies in the North Herefordshire parliamentary constituency.

== Notable people ==
- Lionel George Curtis (1872–1955), a prominent advocate of one-world government, was born in Coddington.
- Sangharakshita (London-born Dennis Lingwood, 1925–2018), writer, commentator and founder of the Triratna Buddhist Community, lived in Coddington.
