= Bosbury =

Village in Herefordshire, England

Coordinates: 52.0880°N 2.4450°W

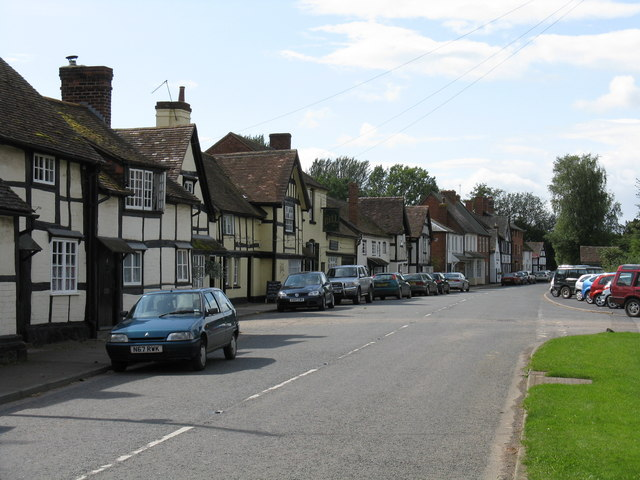

- Location within Herefordshire
- Population: 714
- OS grid reference: SO695434
- Civil parish: Bosbury
- Unitary authority: Herefordshire
- Ceremonial county: Herefordshire
- Region: West Midlands
- Country: England
- Sovereign state: United Kingdom
- Post town: LEDBURY
- Postcode district: HR8
- Dialling code: 01531
- Police: West Mercia
- Fire: Hereford and Worcester
- Ambulance: West Midlands
- UK Parliament: North Herefordshire

Bosbury is a village and civil parish in Herefordshire, England, approximately 3.5 miles (5.6 km) north of Ledbury. The small River Leadon flows through the parish, passing along the west side of the village. Bosbury shares a parish council with neighbouring Coddington.

== Features ==
The village has a primary school, a day nursery, a parish hall (which hosts a monthly farmers' market and a weekly post office counter), a barbers, a historic public house (The Bell), a bowls and tennis club, and a cricket club. A second pub exists just within the parish, on the main road towards Ledbury, at Staplow, The Oak.

The Church of the Holy Trinity stands in the centre of the village and is of early 12th-century foundation with later medieval additions. The 13th-century tower is notable for being one of seven in Herefordshire standing quite apart from the church, some considerable distance in Bosbury's case. This was for defensive purposes in the troubled Marches region. Inside the church sanctuary, one on each of the north and south walls, are two fine examples of Renaissance Italian tombs, dedicated to members of the Harford family who lived in Bosbury throughout the 16th century. Both the main church building and the detached tower are Grade I listed buildings.

The most notable dwelling, Bosbury House, is a substantial Georgian red brick building just outside the village, substantially altered in 1873 and now Grade II listed. Bosbury, both in the village and scattered across the parish, is also noted for its many black and white half-timbered buildings, most of which are Grade II listed.

Outside the village, the parish is well-populated but dispersed, with numerous large farms and small hamlets, including Catley, Stoneyard, Swinmore, Cold Green, Bowley Lane, Pow Green, Townend, Old Country, Slatch Farm, Norbridge, Gold Hill, Stanley Hill, Southfield and part of Staplow.

=== Transport ===
The village is situated on the B4220 road, an old route between Ledbury and Worcester, and a country bus route (Ledbury-Worcester) serves the village, with an additional bus to and from Ledbury on school days.

The nearest railway station is Ledbury, approximately 4 miles (6.4 km) distant by road.

The Herefordshire Trail long-distance footpath passes through the village, as does The National Byway.

The route of the derelict Herefordshire and Gloucestershire Canal passes through the southwest corner of the parish.

=== Agriculture ===
The village was most noted in the 19th and 20th centuries for hops, being the largest hop farming area outside of Kent. The local hop industry in the area is much reduced and many old hop yards stand empty or have been demolished, whilst some oast houses have been converted into dwellings. The countryside of the parish does however still have a sizeable acreage of orchards and hop vines, and there has in recent years been a revival of apple, pear and hop cultivation corresponding with increased popularity and consumption in Britain of traditional cider, perry and ale.

== History ==
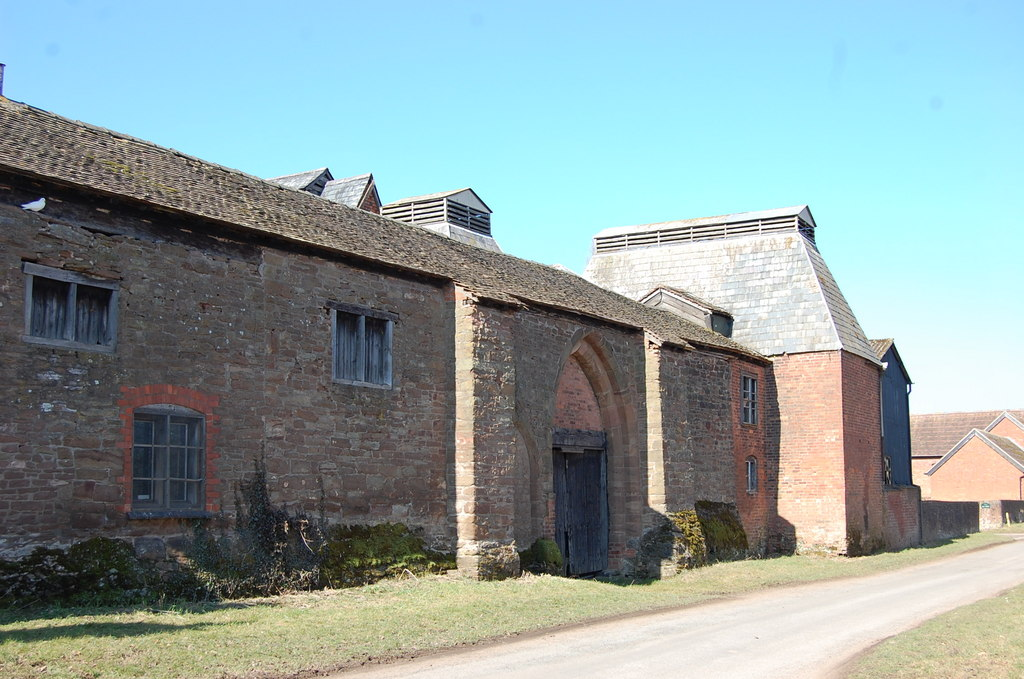
Remnant gateway of the "Bishop's Palace", alongside the lane to Old Court Farm. Note that the buildings have been converted to an oast house.

The bishops of Hereford in medieval times held the manors at Bosbury and Coddington and frequently held court at the manor house in the village. Known as the "Bishop's Palace", there exist some remains at Old Court, to the north of the churchyard. Two bishops of Hereford died in Bosbury – Æthelstan (in 1056) and Richard de Swinfield (in 1317). The palace was converted to agricultural use as an oast house.

A separate manor of Upleadon existed in the parish, on the west side of the Leadon, and included Catley.

The Knights Templar had a base in Bosbury at what is now Temple Court, which was a moated preceptory of the order, and there is a Templar grave stone inside the church.

=== People ===
Bosbury was the home of the chairmaker Philip Clissett from about 1842 until his death in 1913. Clissett is well known for his links to the English Arts and Crafts Movement. The Victorian novelist, Edna Lyall, is buried and commemorated in the churchyard.

== Demographics ==
According to the 2001 census, Bosbury had a population of 780, whilst the two parishes of Bosbury and Coddington had a combined population of 888, decreasing 8.5% to 813 at the 2011 census, giving an estimated population for Bosbury of 714.

== Politics ==
Bosbury and Coddington Parish Council meet monthly at the Parish Hall. Bosbury has eleven seats on the council, whilst Coddington has two.

The parishes of Bosbury, Coddington, Colwall, and Mathon together form the ward of Hope End, which returns one elected councillor to Herefordshire Council. The most recent election was in May 2015, in which the Conservative candidate, Tony Johnson, was elected. Councillor Johnson is the Leader of the Council.

Bosbury lies in the North Herefordshire parliamentary constituency, represented by Ellie Chowns of the Green Party.

== Gallery ==
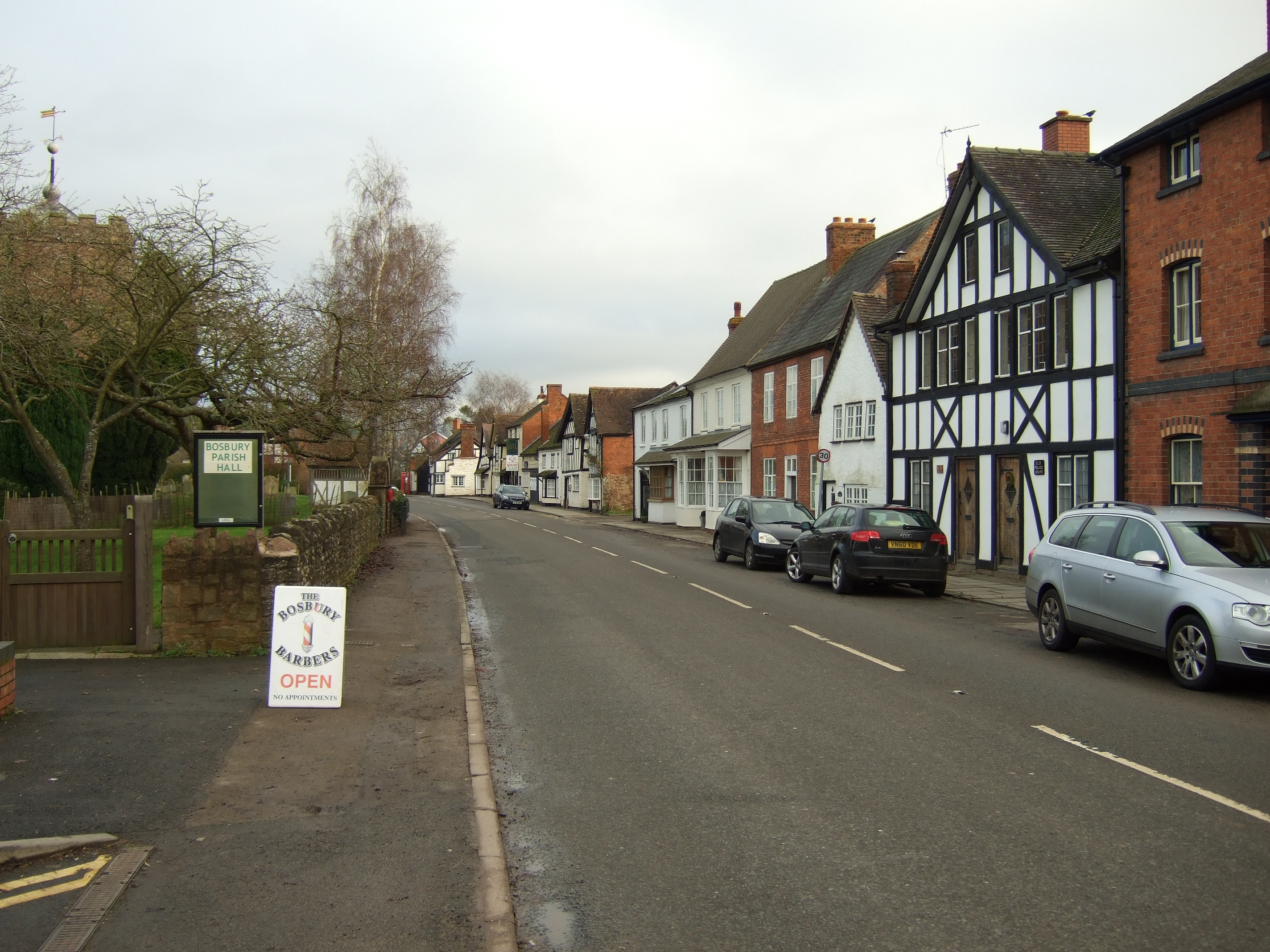
Main Street, looking east.

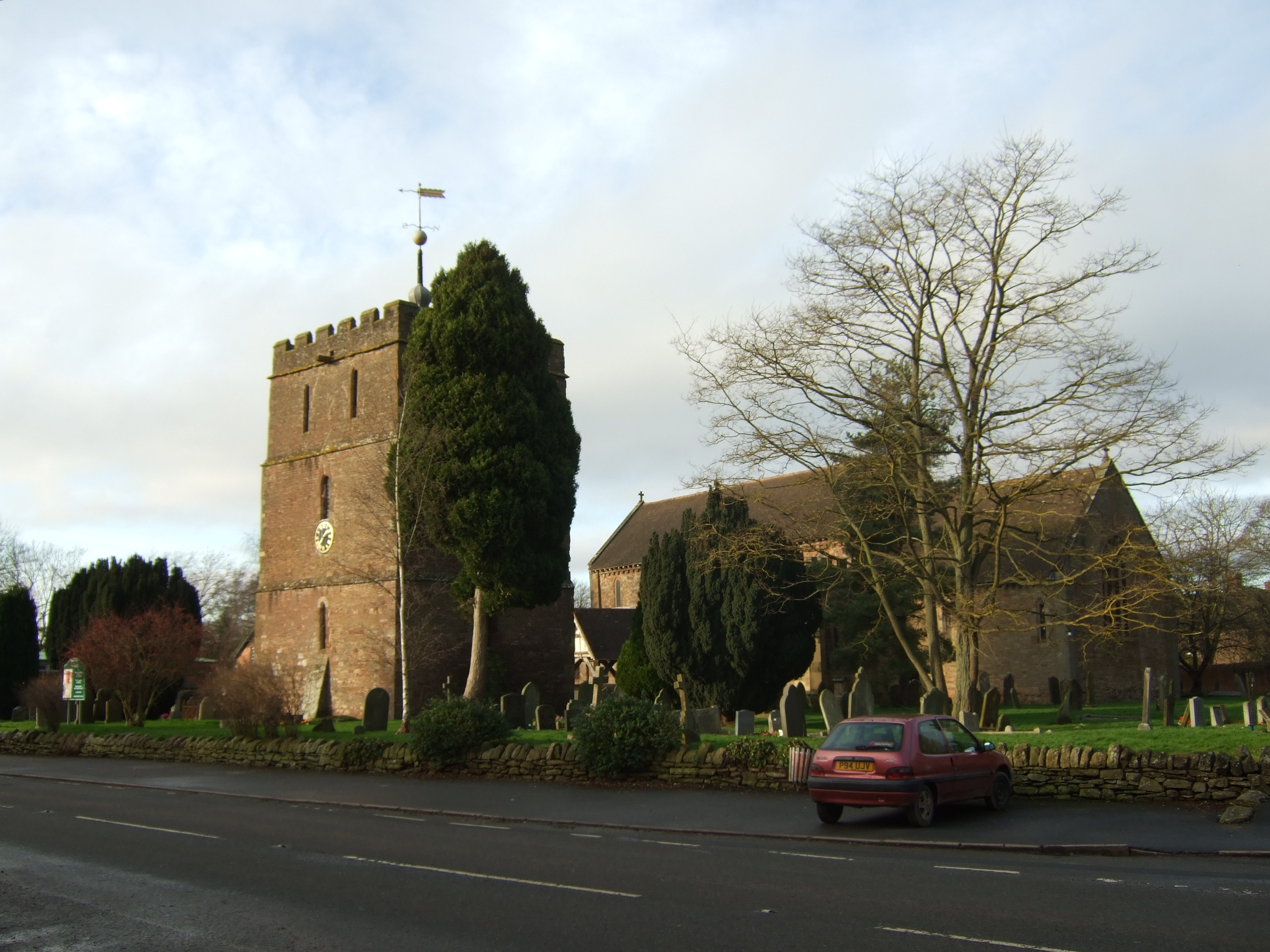
Bosbury Holy Trinity church with its detached tower.

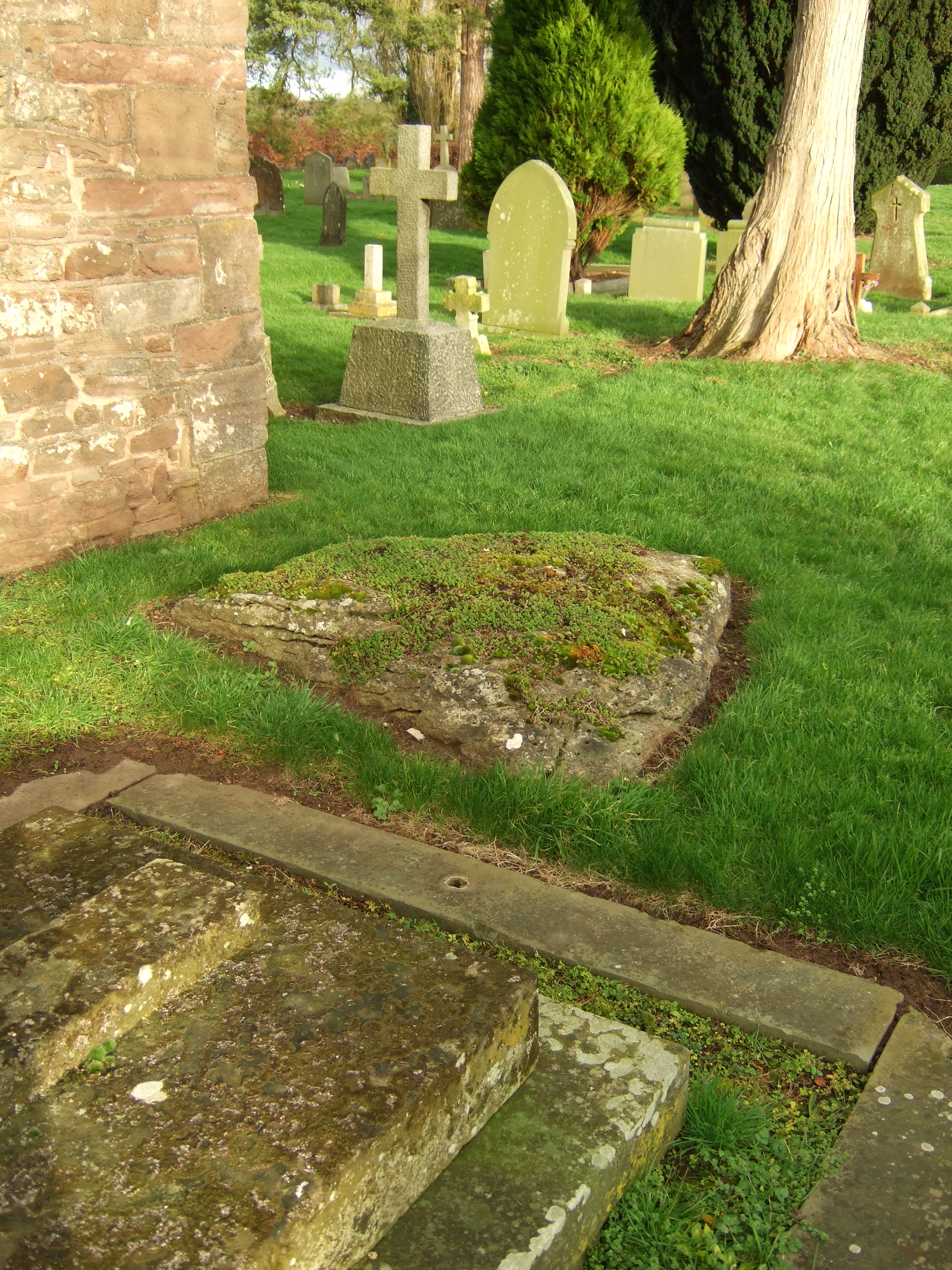
A monolith located at the SE corner of the tower.

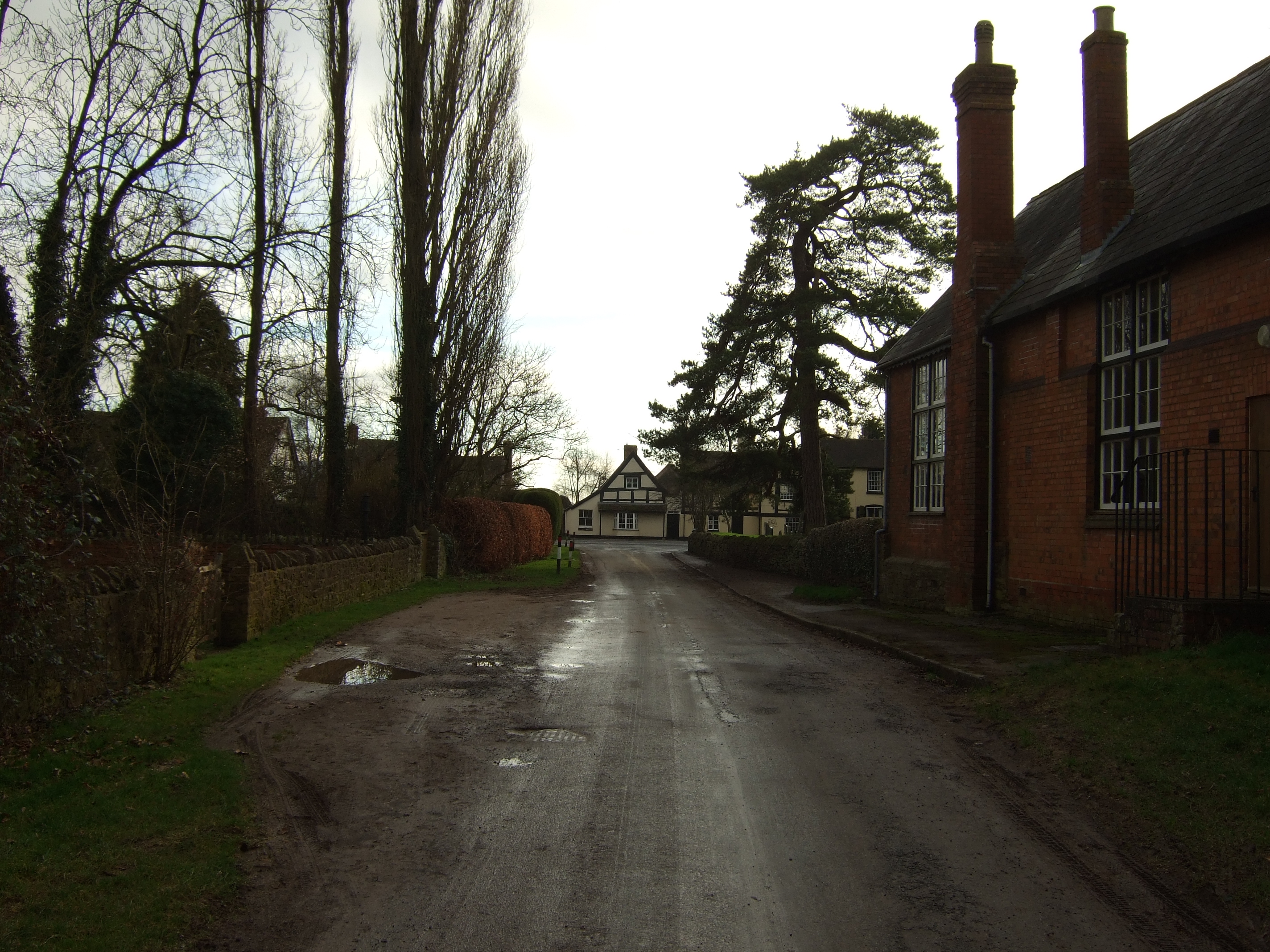
Looking south from the Old Boys' School.

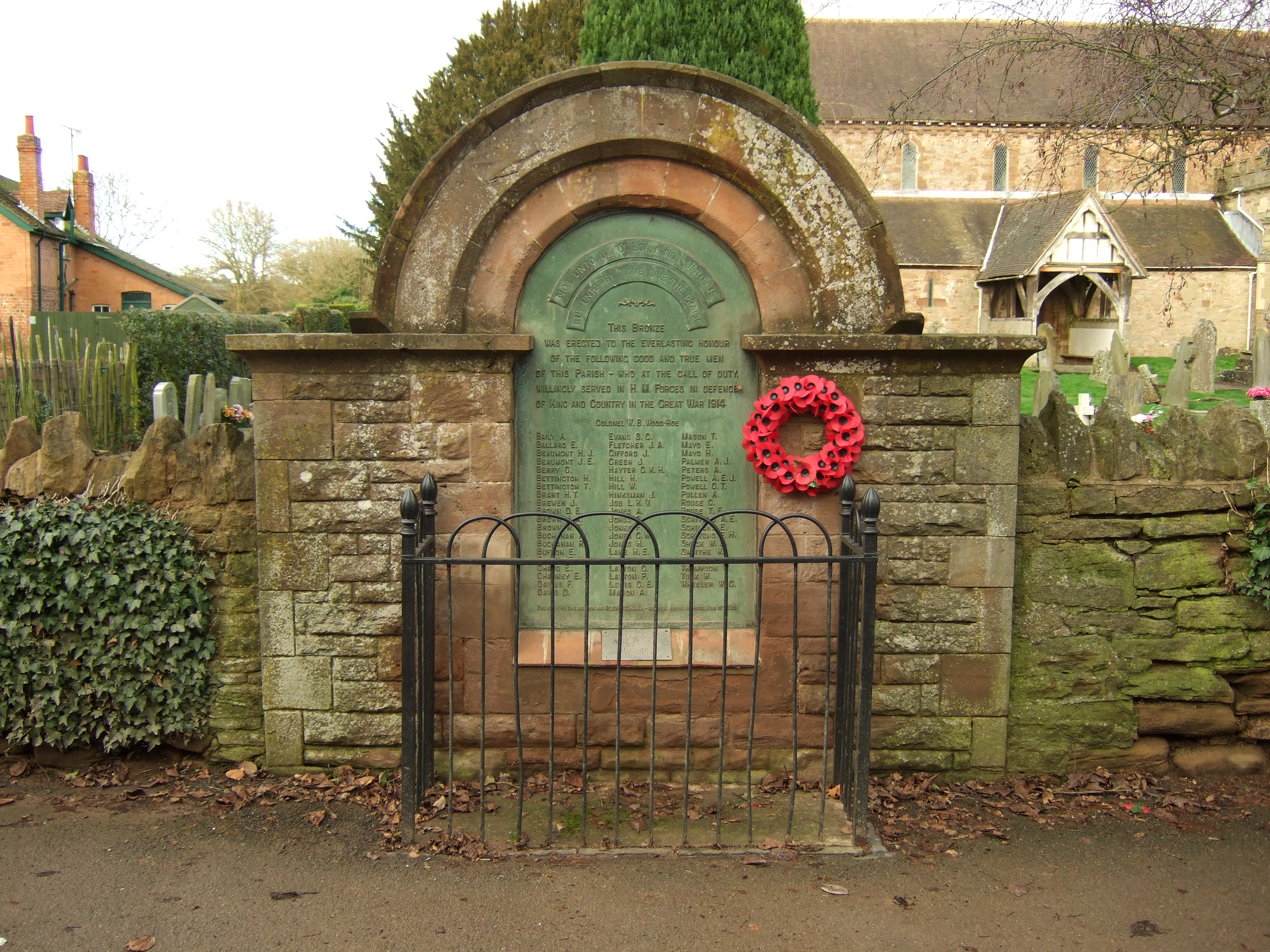
The bronze First World War memorial.

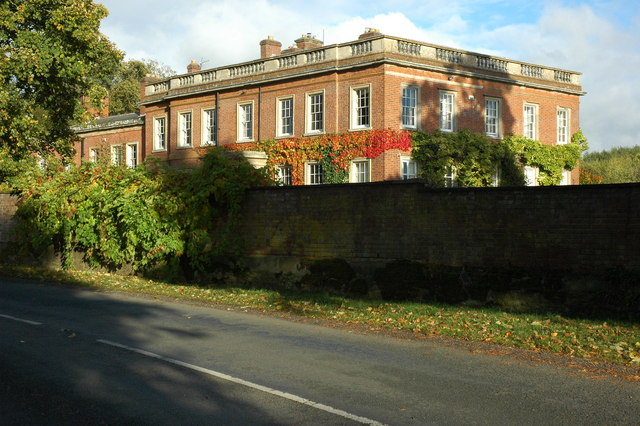
Bosbury House.
