= Ada Ellen Bayly =

English novelist (1857–1903)

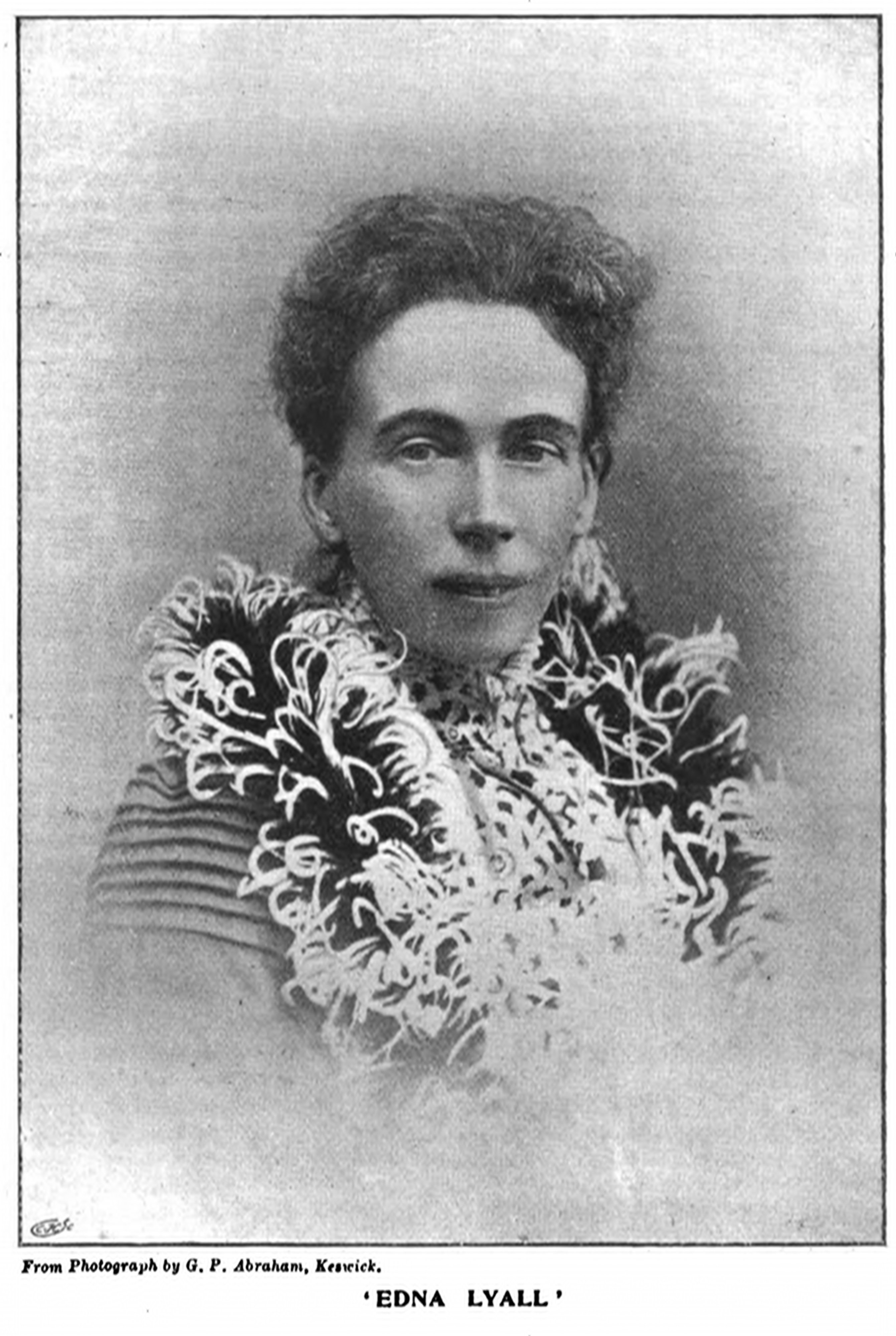
- Born: 25 March 1857; Brighton, Sussex
- Died: 8 February 1903 (aged 45)
- Other name: Edna Lyall
- Occupation: novelist

Signature
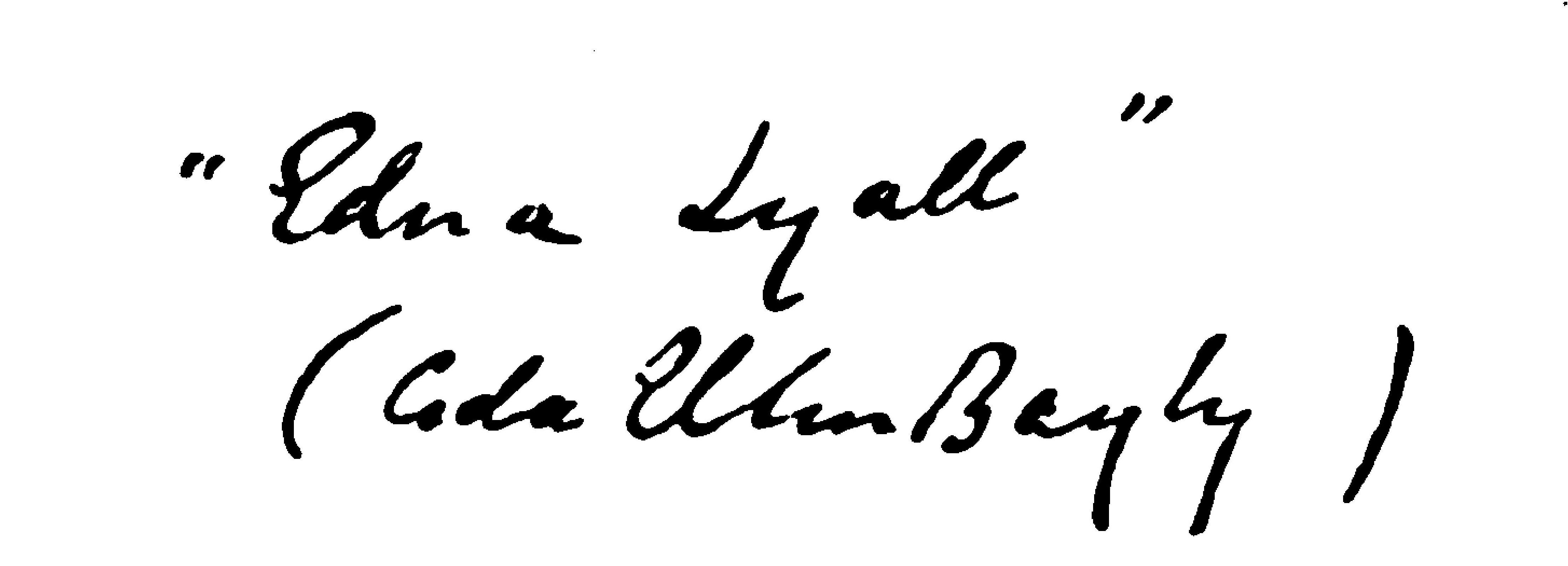

Ada Ellen Bayly (25 March 1857 – 8 February 1903), also known as Edna Lyall, was an English novelist, who "supported the women's suffrage movement from an early age."

== Biography ==
Bayly was born in Brighton, the youngest of four children of a barrister. Early in life she lost both her parents, so that she spent her youth with an uncle in Surrey and in a Brighton private school. Bayly never married. She seems to have spent her adult life living with her two married sisters and her brother, a clergyman in Bosbury, Herefordshire.

In 1879, she published her first novel, Won by Waiting, under the pseudonym "Edna Lyall" (apparently derived from transposing letters from Ada Ellen Bayly). The book was not a success. Success came with We Two, based on the life of Charles Bradlaugh, a social reformer and advocate of free thought. Her historical novel In the Golden Days was the last book read to John Ruskin on his deathbed; while Hope the Hermit was a bestseller set in the Lake District and later an inspiration for Hugh Walpole's Rogue Herries. To Right the Wrong (2nd ed. 1894) is a historical novel about John Hampden and the English Civil War.

Bayly wrote in all eighteen novels, many of them offering interesting explorations of the writer's creative process. Part of her success was due to her practice of using characters from one novel in a different capacity in her next.

== Selected works ==
- Won by Waiting, 1879
- Donovan, 1882
- We Two, sequel of the former, 1884
- In the Golden Days, 1885
- Their Happiest Christmas, 1886
- Knight Errant, 1887
- Autobiography of a Slander, 1887
- A Hardy Norseman, 1889
- Derrick Vaughan, 1889
- To Right the Wrong, 3 vols, 1894
- Doreen: The Story of a Singer, 1894
- How the Children Raised the Wind, 1895
- The Autobiography of a Truth, 1896
- Wayfaring Men: A Novel, 1897
- Hope the Hermit, 1899
- Max Hereford's Dream, 1900
- In Spite of All, 1901
- The Hinderers, 1902
- The Burgess Letters, 1902

== See also ==
- Algernon Sydney
- Charles Bradlaugh
- Elizabeth Gaskell
