= Broach spire =

Type of tall pyramidal spire, which usually sits atop a church

A broach spire

A broach spire is a type of spire (tall pyramidal structure), which usually sits atop a tower or turret of a church. It starts on a square base and is carried up to a tapering octagonal spire by means of triangular faces.

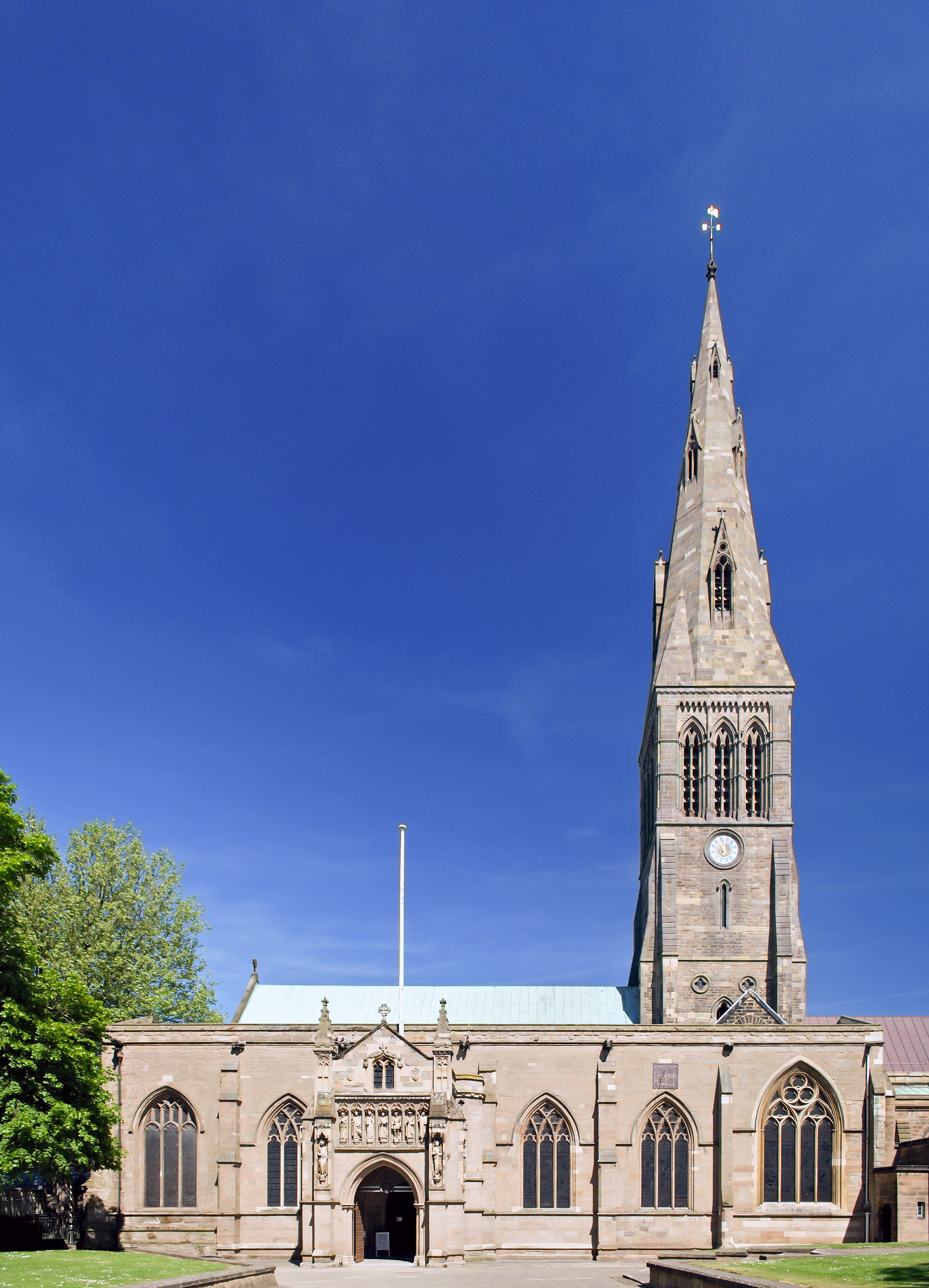
Cathedral Church of Saint Martin, Leicester

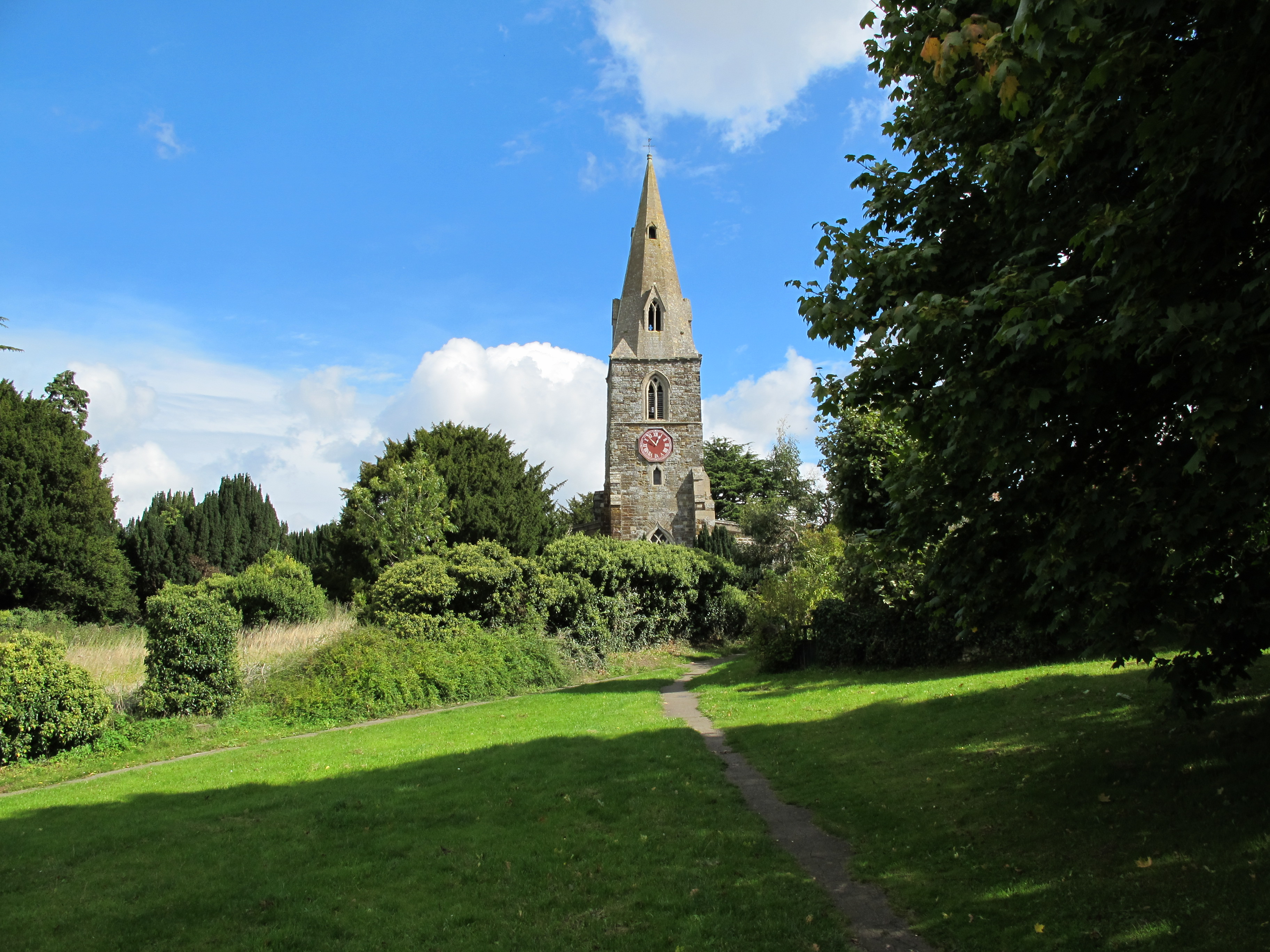
Saint Andrew's Church, Broughton, Northamptonshire

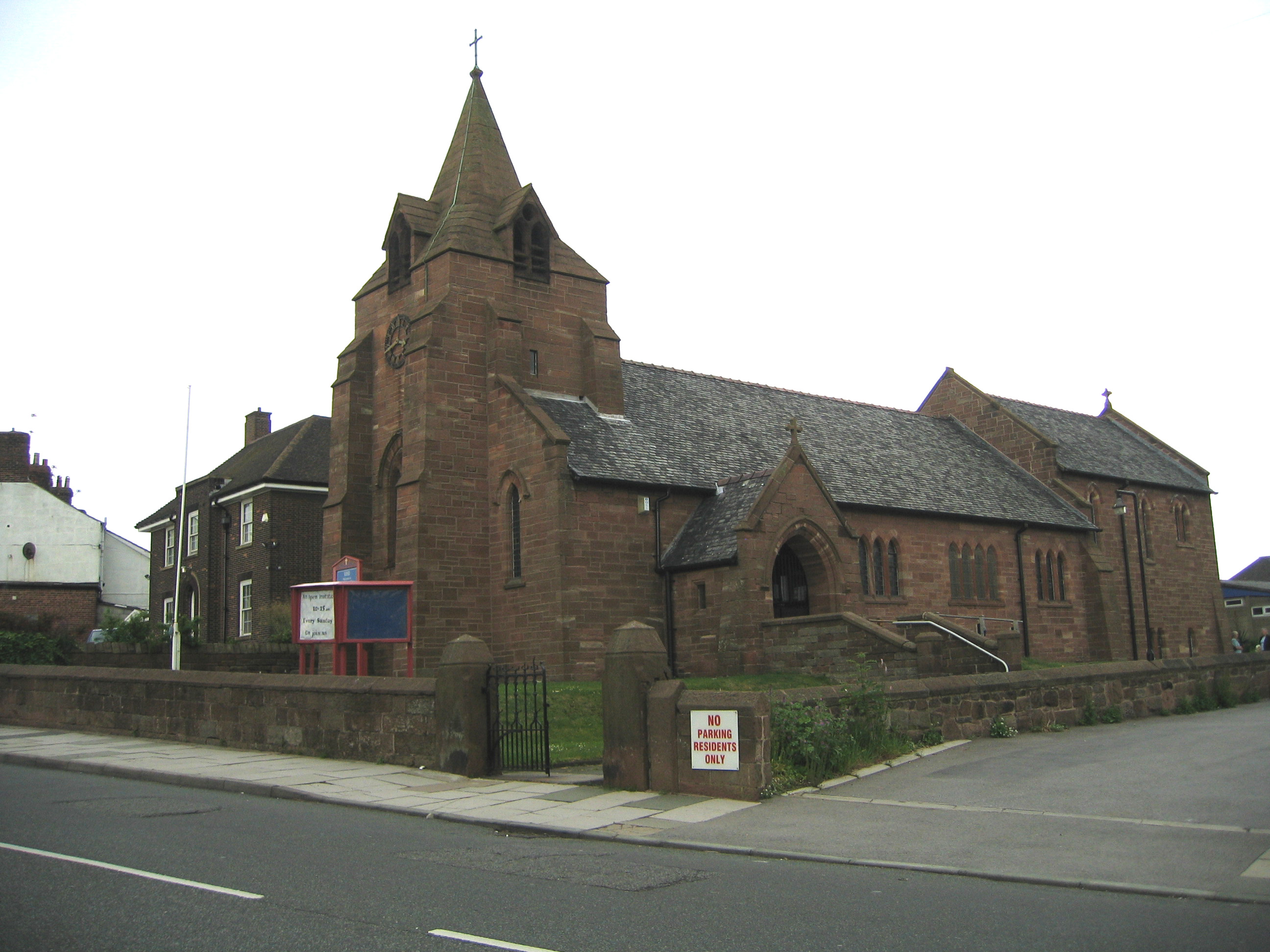
St John's Church, Weston, Runcorn, Cheshire, with its short broach spire

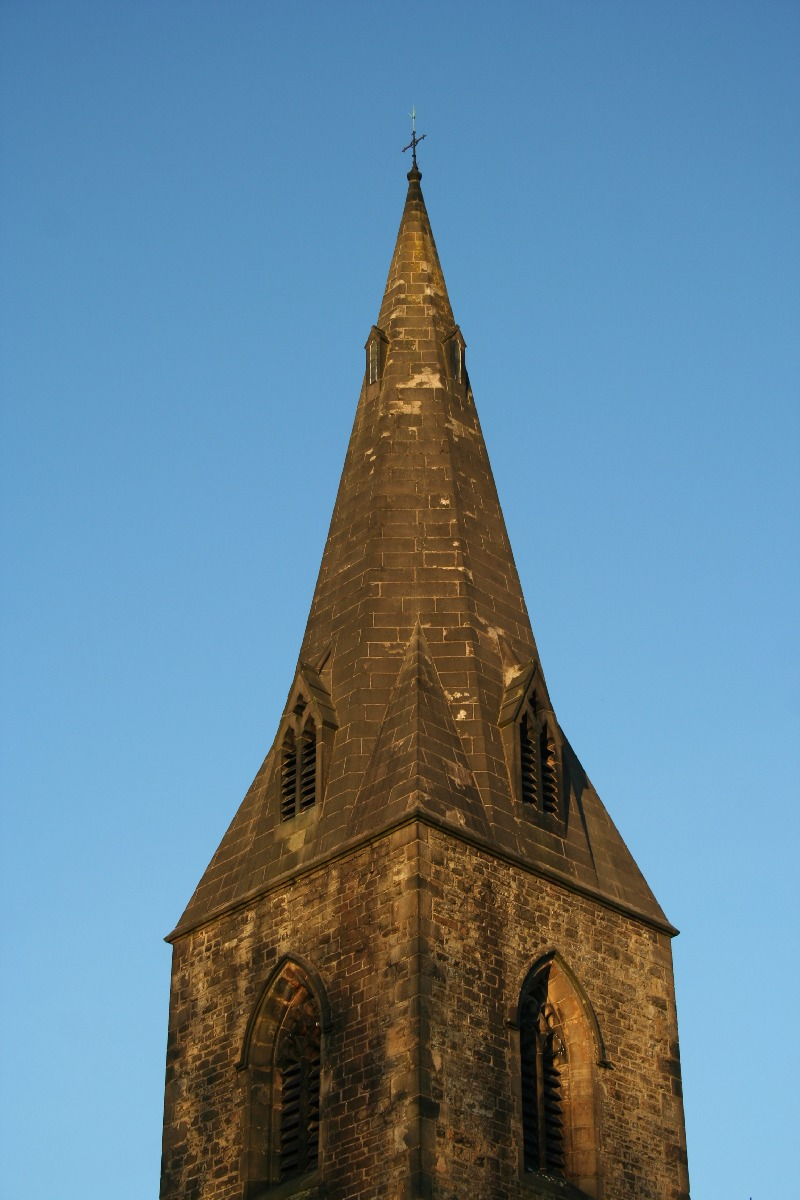
St Mary's Church, New Mills, Derbyshire

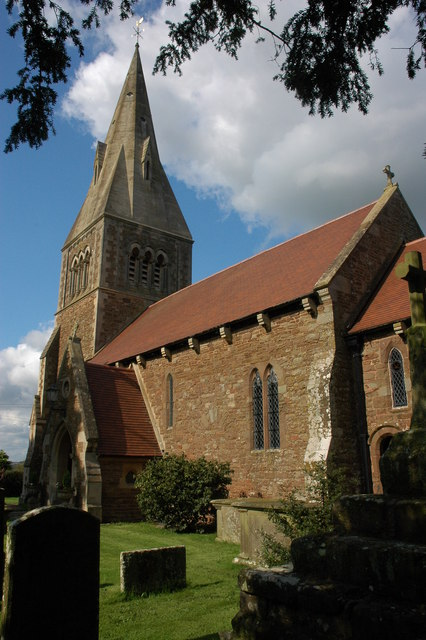
All Saints, Coddington, Herefordshire
