= Joseph Horton =

English cricketer (1915–1998)

Cricket information
- Batting: Right-handed
- Bowling: Right-arm medium

Career statistics
Competition	First-class
Matches	62
Runs scored	1,258
Batting average	13.82
100s/50s	0/4
Top score	70
Balls bowled	595
Wickets	5
Bowling average	72.40
5 wickets in innings	0
10 wickets in match	0
Best bowling	2/3
Catches/stumpings	33/–
- Source: CricInfo, 7 November 2022

Joseph Horton (12 August 1915 – 6 November 1998) was an English first-class cricketer who played 62 matches for Worcestershire in the 1930s.

Born in Colwall Green, Herefordshire, Horton made his debut against Derbyshire in July 1934, but made only 5 and 0 and was not selected again that season. The following year he played nine times, but again met with little success: in 14 innings he made only 76 runs, his highest score a mere 13. He did take 2–3 against Derbyshire (including the wicket of George Pope), but otherwise there was little for Horton to enjoy about his 1935 performances.

Horton played 21 matches in 1936, the most of any summer of his career, and his batting improved somewhat: he made 432 runs at 14.89 including two half-centuries, and his 59 against Gloucestershire came as part of an important ninth-wicket partnership of 80 with Reg Perks after Worcestershire had fallen to 139/8. Horton also picked up two wickets that season, the last he was to take.

For the next two years Horton continued to command a semi-regular place in the side, playing 13 times in 1937 and 18 in 1938, but with a couple of exceptions — such as his 70 against Glamorgan in the latter year — he was unable to produce good enough batting form to make a real claim to a permanent position, and he left first-class cricket without ever having scored 500 runs in a season.

Horton appeared for the Worcestershire second team in minor counties cricket in 1950. He died in Worcester at the age of 83.

His younger brother Henry, who predeceased him by just four days, played a few times for Worcestershire in the 1940s, but had a much more substantial career with Hampshire in the Fifties and Sixties.
