= Colwall =

Civil parish in Herefordshire, England

Coordinates: 52.08031°N 2.35746°W

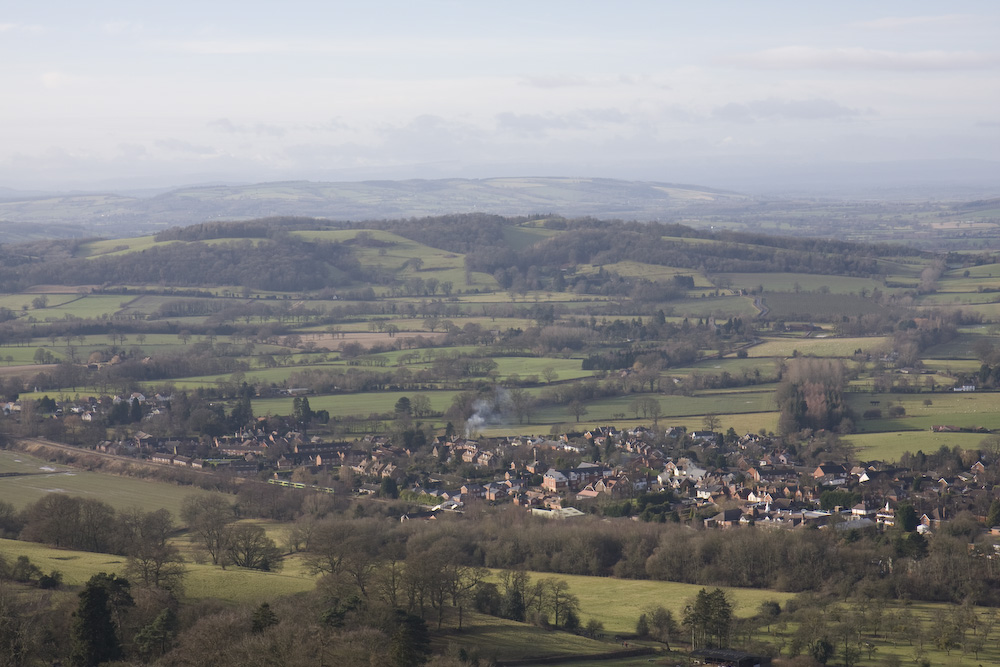
- View of Colwall Stone from the Malvern Hills

- Location within Herefordshire
- Population: 2,400 (2011)
- OS grid reference: SO756425
- Civil parish: Colwall
- Unitary authority: Herefordshire
- Ceremonial county: Herefordshire
- Region: West Midlands
- Country: England
- Sovereign state: United Kingdom
- Post town: MALVERN
- Postcode district: WR13
- Dialling code: 01684
- Police: West Mercia
- Fire: Hereford and Worcester
- Ambulance: West Midlands

Colwall is a civil parish in Herefordshire, England, on the border with Worcestershire, on the western side of the Malvern Hills, and within the AONB. Areas of the village are known as Colwall Stone, Upper Colwall which shares a common border at the Wyche Cutting with the Malvern suburb of Malvern Wells, and Colwall Green, spread along 2 miles (3.2 km) of the B4218 road, with the historic village core (at the parish church) being 1 mile (1.6 km) to the west of Colwall Stone.

A feature of Colwall is the view of the Iron Age British Camp (Herefordshire Beacon), which largely falls within the southeast corner of the parish. The towns of Ledbury and Malvern are 5 miles (8.0 km) southwest and 3 miles (4.8 km) northeast respectively from Colwall Stone, via the B4218. Colwall is often included in the informal region referred to as "The Malverns", which refers to the Malvern Hills and the surrounding settlements.

== Amenities and landmarks ==
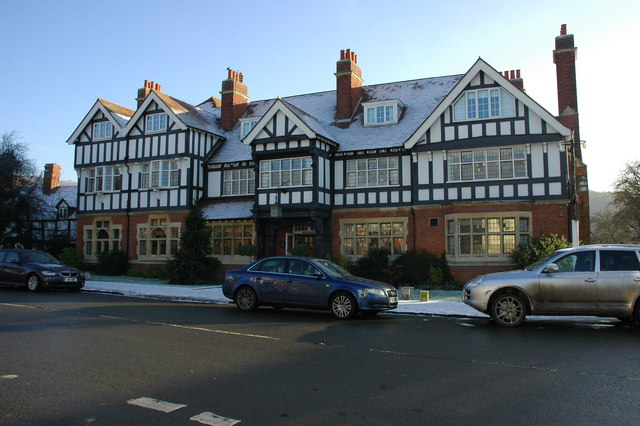
Colwall Park Hotel

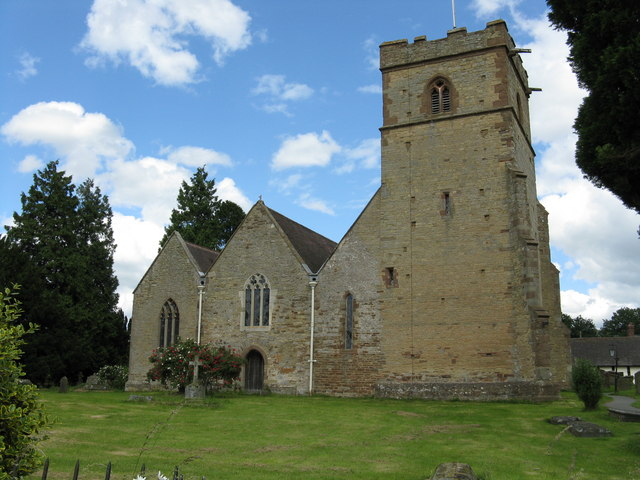
St. James the Great Church

The village is served by a single platform railway station on the single track line between the Great Malvern and Ledbury railway stations, which passes through the Colwall Tunnels, the first of which was dug under the Malvern Hills between 1856 and 1860. The original tunnel was closed in the 1920s when it was in danger of collapse, but served the nation during the Second World War when used as a torpedo store; it is now a roost for a colony of lesser horseshoe bats. Near to the station is the mock Tudor country house style Colwall Park Hotel, purpose built in 1905 to serve the now defunct Colwall Park Racecourse.

South of the village is the Grade II listed Barton Court, built circa 1785 for Henry Lambert.

From the 1920s until the 1960s, the road passing through Colwall and The Wyche was numbered the A4105, before being re-classified as the B4218. It is named "Walwyn Road" from Colwall Green to The Wyche Cutting, and is served by the 675 bus route, running between Great Malvern, West Malvern, Wellington Heath and Ledbury, Mondays through Saturdays.

The village has a state primary school (Church of England), and two independent preparatory schools, The Downs, Malvern College Prep. and The Elms, founded in 1614. The village is also home to a BBC Children in Need youth project 'Colwall Youth Project' that serves over 180 young people from Colwall and the surrounding area (including Malvern and Ledbury). 'Colwall Youth Project' was founded by Colwall Community Church and now receives funding from National Lottery, BBC Children in Need and the Everson Trust. The world's oldest (private) miniature railway is the Downs Light Railway, located on the Downs school estate.

Colwall Stone has numerous local shops and service businesses, including a convenience store, a small fruit and vegetable shop, a butcher's shop, a pharmacy, an estate agent, a hairdressers and a specialist garden centre. There is also a library, a doctors' surgery and a post office. In Upper Colwall, near The Wyche Cutting, is the Malvern Hills GeoCentre, located in the Wyche Innovation Centre (occupying the former Skot Transformers building) along with a cafe and many small businesses.

The village has several church buildings, most notably the historic Church of England parish church of St James the Great, located in the small medieval core to the west of Colwall Stone. The 'Colwall Community Church' is situated on Walwyn Road in Colwall Stone. On Jubilee Drive in Upper Colwall is the 'Wyche Free Church'. There is also a large, modern village hall on Mill Lane between Colwall Stone and Colwall Green, which incorporates the Church of England's St Crispin's Chapel. The Church of the Good Shepherd in Upper Colwall is no longer a place of worship.

There are four public houses in the parish – the Chase Inn in Upper Colwall, the Crown in Colwall Stone, the Yew Tree in Colwall Green, and the Wellington Inn in Chance's Pitch. Additionally there is the Colwall Park Hotel and Thai Rama in Colwall Stone and the Malvern Hills Hotel at the southern end of Jubilee Drive, near the British Camp.

A clock tower, built in 1931, stands in Colwall Stone, and is locally known as "Aunt Alice".

The population of the parish was recorded in the 2011 census at 2,400 – compared to 2,433 in the 2001 census.

Colwall also has a well known Scout group known as 1st Colwall, as well as an attached Explorer Group, named Tiggers. Tiggers recently won at Camp Cockerel, a countywide scouting competition.

== Malvern water ==
Malvern water has formed a part of the national heritage and culture since Queen Elizabeth I made a point of drinking it in public in the 16th century, and Queen Victoria refused to travel without it. In 1987 Malvern gained recognition as a Natural Mineral Water, a mark of purity and quality. Malvern Water was the only bottled water used by Queen Elizabeth II, which she took on her travels around the world.

It was mentioned in 1622 in Bannister's Breviary of the Eyes:

A little more I'll of their curing tell.
How they helped sore eyes with a new found well.
Great speech of Malvern Hills was late reported
Unto which spring people in troops resorted.

..."The Malvern water says Dr John Wall is famous for containing just nothing at all"...!

It was first bottled on a commercial scale in 1851 and sold as Malvern Soda and then as Malvern Seltzer Water from 1856. In 1890, Schweppes entered into a contract with a Colwall family, and built a bottling plant in 1892. The actual source of the spring is on the western side of the hills in Herefordshire. The factory was acquired by Coca-Cola & Schweppes Beverages and latterly employed 25 people who bottled 12 million litres annually. On 21 October 2010, Coca-Cola announced that Malvern Water would cease production and the Colwall plant would be sold off to property developers. Malvern Water was priced out of the market, with a market share of just 1%.

== Politics ==
Colwall has a parish council.

The parishes of Bosbury, Coddington, Colwall, and Mathon together form the ward of Hope End, which returns one elected councillor to Herefordshire Council. The most recent election was in May 2015, in which the Conservative candidate, Tony Johnson, was elected. Councillor Johnson is the Leader of the Council.

== Sport ==
Colwall is notable in cricket and has one of Herefordshire's main cricket grounds – Stowe Lane – which hosts a minor counties championship match and a minor counties knockout trophy match every year. In 1926 the Women's Cricket Association was founded in Colwall, and a Women's Cricket Week is held there every year. The Horton brothers Joseph and Henry, came from Colwall, and both played first-class cricket for Worcestershire; Henry went to greater fame with Hampshire.

Horse racing took place at Colwall Park Racecourse from 1900 to 1939, and the course also staged pony racing in 1949 and point-to-point from 1960 to 1963.

== Popular culture ==
Legend has it that the Colwall Stone (which gave its name to the settlement of Colwall Stone that has grown around it) was rolled down from the Malvern Hills by a giant whose footprint can be seen to this day on the slopes of the British Camp. The stone was replaced at some point; it took a horse and cart to take the old one away.
