= Mathon, Herefordshire =

Village in Herefordshire, England

Coordinates: 52.11°N 2.385°W

Mathon
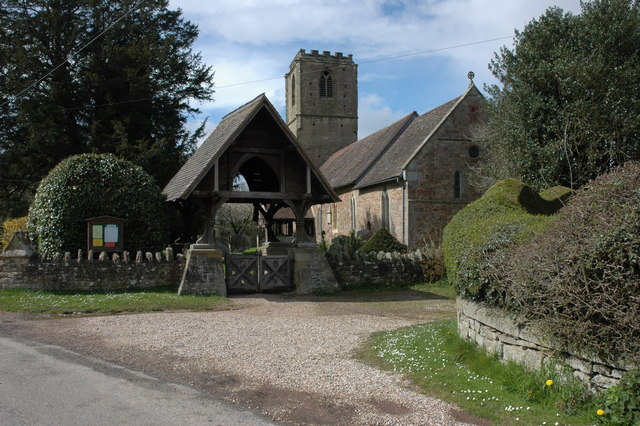
- Lych gate to Mathon Church

- Location within Herefordshire
- Population: 280
- OS grid reference: SO734458
- Civil parish: Mathon
- Unitary authority: Herefordshire Council
- Ceremonial county: Herefordshire
- Region: West Midlands
- Country: England
- Sovereign state: United Kingdom
- Post town: Malvern
- Postcode district: WR13
- Police: West Mercia
- Fire: Hereford and Worcester
- Ambulance: West Midlands

Mathon is a small village and civil parish in eastern Herefordshire, England, lying just to the west of the Malvern Hills between Malvern and Ledbury. Nearby villages include Cradley and Colwall. Immediately to the east is the county boundary with Worcestershire.

The population was recorded by the 2011 census at 280.

== Politics ==
Mathon has a parish council.

The parishes of Bosbury, Coddington, Colwall, and Mathon together form the ward of Hope End, which returns one elected councillor to Herefordshire Council. The most recent election was in May 2019, in which the Conservative candidate, Tony Johnson, was elected. Councillor Johnson was the Leader of the Council until resigning the position in March 2018. At the 2019 election, the Conservatives lost control of the council.

== History ==
The village name comes from the Old English "mathum" meaning "gift".

Mathon civil parish, including West Malvern, was in Worcestershire until 1897. In that year the rural Mathon part was transferred to Herefordshire.
