= Bogside Racecourse =

Sports venue in North Ayrshire, Scotland

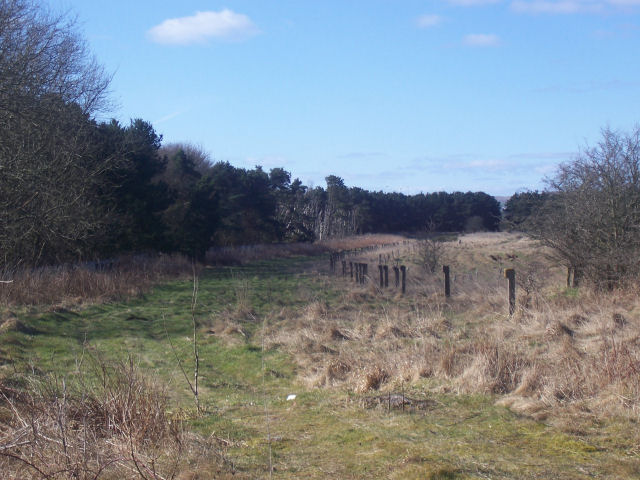
- A stretch of track from the abandoned Bogside Racecourse
- Location: Irvine, Ayrshire
- Coordinates: 55°37′41″N 4°42′35″W
- Owned by: Defunct
- Date opened: 7 June 1808
- Date closed: 10 April 1965
- Course type: Flat; National Hunt
- Notable races: Scottish Grand National

Bogside Racecourse was a horse racing track situated near the town of Irvine, Scotland, on the banks of the River Irvine, about 14 miles from Ayr.

The course opened in 1808, although races had been staged near Bogside before this. In 1636 many subscribers had donated a large sum of money to support annual race meetings. In the 1770s meetings known as the 'Irvine Marymass Races' took place.

The first meeting at Bogside, on the private estate of the Earl of Eglinton, was held on Tuesday 7th and Wednesday 8 June 1808. The first race was a Sweepstakes over 3 miles, won by Mr Boswell's Delphini, with Lord Montgomerie's Beningbrough, second. A valuable Silver Cup was added to the programme in 1810. In 1811 the meeting was advertised as 'Irvine Races on the Bogside course'.

The Scottish Grand National was first run in 1858 as the West of Scotland Grand National over three miles on Houston Racecourse in Renfrewshire, several miles west of Glasgow. There were 32 obstacles, mainly stone walls. Houston closed in 1867, so the race was transferred to Bogside that year, with prize money of £100. It was won by the Duke of Hamilton's The Elk, who beat 10 rivals by four lengths. This victory completed a memorable double for his jockey, John Page, and the owner, the Duke of Hamilton, who had won the Grand National a few weeks earlier with Cortolvin. The race's title was changed to 'Scottish Grand National' in 1880, and the distance extended to 3 miles 7 furlongs. It was won by Peacock.

Two horses won the Scottish Grand National at Bogside three times: Southern Hero (1934, 1936 and 1939, when he was 14 and carrying 12st 3lbs; he finished second in 1937 and 1938) and Queen's Taste (1953, 1954 and 1956).

Bogside held its final Scottish Grand National, worth £3,444 to the winner, on 10 April 1965. The winner was Brasher (4 to 1), trained by T. Robson (who rode Queen's Taste to victory in 1953) and ridden by J. Fitzgerald.

Bogside's flat and national hunt courses were undulating, right-handed triangular courses of about two miles in length. The steeplechase course had twelve fences, including two open ditches and a water jump. The run-in from the last fence was 370 yards, with the horses by-passing a plain fence and the water jump. The jockey H. ('Bobby') Beasley commented that. "The fences at Bogside were black and the guard rails were the same colour. There was no gorse apron or yellow bars on the take-off side to encourage the horse to jump."

The flat course had a home straight of about 3 furlongs, with a rise about 2 furlongs from the winning post. There was a straight course of 6 furlongs.

It was here that the first steeplechase recorded in Scotland took place on 25 April 1839.

During its existence it hosted the Scottish Grand National (now contested at nearby Ayr) and twice hosted the National Hunt Chase Challenge Cup which now takes place at the Cheltenham Festival. Its other major race was the Bogside Cup.

Among the most notable achievements at the course was jockey Alec Russell riding all six winners in a day at the flat meeting on 19 July 1957: Double Up, Cligarry, Wage Claim, Courtlier, Newton, Roseline. He had ridden the winner of the final race at Lanark the day before, so that was seven consecutive winners.

From 1894 until 1965 the racecourse had its own railway station, Bogside Racecourse.

In 1963, the Levy Board opted to cease funding the course, declaring 'When Ayr is developed as the main Scottish course, racing under both rules, the retention of Bogside, only 12 miles away, cannot be economically justified'. Racing at Bogside ceased soon thereafter. The final Flat meeting was held on Saturday 19 September 1964, and the last National Hunt meeting on 10 April 1965.

Point-to-Point meetings took place at Bogside until 1994, and evidence of the former racecourse still remains.

== See also ==
- List of British racecourses
