= Bedford Racecourse =

Horse racing venue in Bedford, England

- Location: Bedford, England
- Owned by: Defunct
- Notable races: First ever steeplechase

Bedford Racecourse was a former horse racing venue in Bedford, England.

In 1811, it held the first steeplechase over manufactured fences in front of a crowd of 40,000 spectators. A horse called Fugitive won, beating a horse called Cecilia over a three-mile course in which four 4 ft 6in fences were each jumped twice.

It was hosting two annual meetings by 1840.

== Bibliography ==
- Barrett, Norman, ed. (1995). The Daily Telegraph Chronicle of Horse Racing. Enfield, Middlesex: Guinness Publishing.
- Whyte, James Christie (1840). History of the British turf, from the earliest period to the present day, Volume I. London: H. Colburn. OL 6544990M.
