= Colwall Park Racecourse =

British horse racing venue

Colwall Park
- Location: Colwall, Herefordshire, England
- Coordinates: 52.075585°N 2.358174°W
- Date opened: 10 May 1900
- Date closed: 25 May 1939
- Race type: National Hunt

Colwall Park Racecourse was a British horse racing venue which operated from 1900 to 1939. It was known as one of England’s prettiest racecourses.

The course was designed by journalist and National Hunt fan, Frederick Page, as a left-handed, mainly flat steeplechase course of one and a half miles. It had eight fences, including two ditches and a water jump. There was also a one-mile hurdle course. There was a slight rise on the far side of the course and a run-in of 400 yards.

The course was situated at Brook Farm on the Barton Court Estate, near to the village railway station and was established by Roland Cave-Brown-Cave, a local man who had married the widowed daughter of the estate's owners. He built the nearby hotel, which still exists. The first meeting was held on Thursday 10 May 1900. Meetings were held annually, with the main races being the Herefordshire Open Hunters Steeplechase and Colwall Stewards Hurdle.

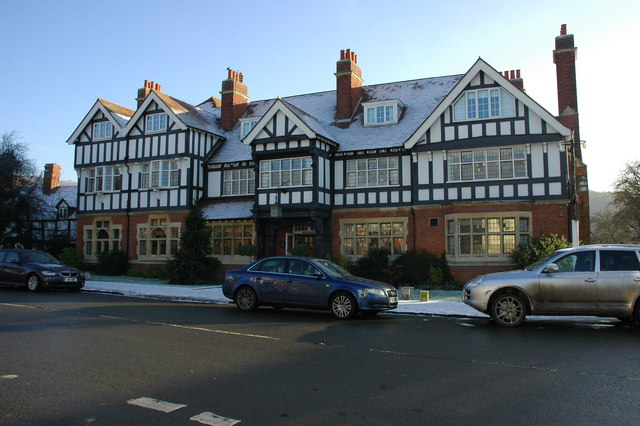
The Park Hotel, built by Cave-Brown-Cave nearby

Cave-Brown-Cave was reputedly not very good in business, and by 1915 the course was in financial trouble. As a result, the estate, including the racecourse, was auctioned off and bought by J. Scott Bowden. Racing continued throughout the First World War, with four meetings a year on Mondays in March, April, May and October. In the 1920s, the course continued to hold minor jump meetings and by the 1930s, it sold annual memberships and two Tote buildings had been built. The course proved popular with day trippers from South Wales, and hosted famous horses including the future Grand National winner Tipperary Tim who won his first race there, and African Sister, who would win the Champion Hurdle. The course also welcomed top riders like Ernie Piggott and Geoffrey Scudamore of the famous racing family.

During the Second World War, Bowden sold the land, under threat of compulsory purchase, to military contractors Dowsett McKay. It became a military vehicle park for the duration of the war and afterwards the new owners chose not to continue racing. The final meeting at the course was therefore the one held on Thursday 25 May 1939. This was not the end of all racing at the course, however. Pony racing took place for five days in 1949 and the North Ledbury Hunt held point-to-point meetings there between 1960 and 1963.

Nowadays, the area where the racecourse was, is arable farmland and there is little visual trace of its existence, except for the concrete base of one of the stands and a short stretch of running rail. One of the Tote buildings is now a lunchroom on a local estate.
