= Leonard Blunt =

English cricketer (1929–2005)

Personal information
- Born: 29 March 1921; Worcester, England
- Died: July 2005 (aged 83–84); Evesham, Worcestershire, England
- Batting: Right-handed
- Bowling: Right arm fast-medium

Domestic team information
- Years: Team
- 1942/43: Europeans
- 1946–1948: Worcestershire

Career statistics
Competition	FC
Matches	15
Runs scored	109
Batting average	7.26
100s/50s	0/0
Top score	18
Balls bowled	2,058
Wickets	37
Bowling average	26.10
5 wickets in innings	1
10 wickets in match	0
Best bowling	5-60
Catches/stumpings	4/0
- Source: CricketArchive, 3 October 2008

Leonard Blunt (21 March 1929 – July 2005) was a cricketer who played first-class cricket for Worcestershire and the Europeans in the 1940s. He also stood on one occasion as a first-class umpire.

Blunt made his first-class debut on Boxing Day 1942, turning out for Europeans against Indians in the Madras Presidency Match; he took four wickets and made a duck in his only innings.

After the end of the Second World War, Blunt played 14 first-class games for Worcestershire between 1946 and 1948, and he made a good start to his county cricket career by taking seven wickets (including his career best of 5-60) against Hampshire at Southampton on debut. However, he could not keep up this form, and after 1946 he appeared but rarely.

Although he was not seen in the first-class game after 1948, Blunt continued to play for Worcestershire's Second XI for another year, and in the early 1950s produced some impressive performances in minor counties cricket for Cheshire. He took 8–20 against Yorkshire's Second XI in late May 1951, and had a remarkable run against Northumberland in July of the following year: in three consecutive innings, spread over two games, Blunt claimed 5-49, 6-49 and 6-46.

After the end of his Worcestershire career, Blunt had a single outing as a first-class umpire, standing in a match between Worcestershire and the Combined Services in 1949.
