= Roseate Tern (horse) =

British-bred Thoroughbred racehorse

- Sire: Blakeney
- Grandsire: Hethersett
- Dam: Rosia Bay
- Damsire: High Top
- Sex: Mare
- Foaled: 12 March 1986
- Country: United Kingdom
- Colour: Bay
- Breeder: Lord Porchester
- Owner: 7th Earl of Carnarvon; Peter M. Brant
- Trainer: Dick Hern; Luca Cumani
- Record: 14: 3-6-2
- Earnings: £252,257

Major wins
- Lancashire Oaks (1989); Yorkshire Oaks (1989); Jockey Club Stakes (1990)

Roseate Tern (12 March 1986 – 2007) was a British Thoroughbred racehorse and broodmare. In her first seven races she failed to win but was placed in several major races including the May Hill Stakes, Epsom Oaks and Ribblesdale Stakes. She then recorded her first win in the Lancashire Oaks before recording her biggest win in the Yorkshire Oaks and then finished third in the St Leger. She won the Jockey Club Stakes as a four-year-old and later had some success as a broodmare. She was involved in two of the major racing controversies of the late 1980s: the dismissal of Dick Hern and the Aga Khan's boycott of British racing.

== Background ==
Roseate Tern was a bay mare bred by her owner Henry Herbert, Lord Porchester, the racing manager of Queen Elizabeth II. In 1987, Herbert inherited the title Earl of Carnarvon on the death of his father.

She was sired by Blakeney, who won The Derby in 1969 before being retired to the National Stud. His other major winners included Julio Mariner, Juliette Marny and Tyrnavos. Blakeney was a representative of the Byerley Turk sire line, unlike more than 95% of modern thoroughbreds, who descend directly from the Darley Arabian. Roseate Tern's dam, Rosia Bay, showed modest racing ability, winning two minor races from eight attempts in 1979 and 1980. She was a daughter of the broodmare Ouija, who was also the dam of Teleprompter, the grandam of Ouija Board and the great-grandam of Australia. Rosia Bay herself had previously produced Ibn Bey.

The filly was sent into training with Dick Hern at West Ilsley. Hern had been based at the yard since 1962 and was the principal trainer of the Queen's racehorses.

== Racing career ==
=== 1988: two-year-old season ===
Roseate Tern began her racing career in a Graduation Race (for horses with no more than one previous win) over seven furlongs at Doncaster Racecourse on 28 July 1988. She started the 8/13 favourite but after taking the lead a furlong out she was overtaken in the final strides and beaten a neck by Grey Spectre. In a similar event at Haydock Park in August she again started favourite but after leading for most of the way she was overtaken on the line and finished second, a head behind the winner Prince Ibrahim. On 7 September the filly was moved up in class and distance for the Group Three May Hill Stakes over one mile at Doncaster. Ridden by Willie Carson, she started an 18/1 outsider in a field headed by the Henry Cecil-trained Tessla. After racing close behind the leaders she took the lead in the straight, but for the third time in succession she was caught in the closing stages and was beaten a short head by Tessla. On her final appearance of the year, Roseate Tern was moved up to Group One class for the Fillies' Mile at Ascot Racecourse. She started 5/1 second favourite, but after leading in the early stages she finished fourth of the eight runners behind Tessla, Pick of the Pops and Rain Burst.

In late 1988 it was announced that Lord Carnarvon had decided that Hern would lose his job as the Queen's trainer and be replaced at West Ilsley by William Hastings-Bass. A compromise was subsequently reached, whereby Hern would share the premises in 1989 as he sought an alternative base. The treatment of Hern, who had been partially paralysed by a riding accident in 1984 and who was recovering from heart surgery at the time of the announcement, caused much adverse comment in the British racing community. In his own defence, Carnarvon said that he was acting in the monarch's best interests as Hern was no longer physically capable of running the stable.

=== 1989: three-year-old season ===
Despite the ill-feeling between her owner and trainer, Roseate Tern remained in Hern's care in 1989. She began her campaign in the Listed Pretty Polly Stakes over ten furlongs at Newmarket Racecourse on 4 May. Starting third choice in the betting behind Snow Bride and stayed on in the closing stages to finish third, a neck and a head behind Rambushka and Always On A Sunday. The placings of the first two were reversed following a stewards' inquiry.

On 10 June Roseate Tern, still a maiden after five starts was one of nine fillies to contest the 211th running of the Oaks Stakes over one and a half miles at Epsom Downs Racecourse and started a 25/1 outsider. The Aga Khan IV's filly Aliysa started favourite ahead of Musical Bliss, Snow Bride and Tessla, with Rambushka and Always On A Sunday among the other runners. Roseate Tern was in sixth place entering the straight and then made steady progress to finish third, beaten three lengths and a short head by Aliysa and Snow Bride. Aliysa was subsequently disqualified after testing positive for a metabolite of a banned substance, with Snow Bride and Roseate Tern being promoted to first and second. The decision led to the Aga Khan to remove all of his racehorses from training in Britain. Twelve days after her run at Epsom Roseate Tern started second favourite behind the previously undefeated Nearctic Flame in the Group Two Ribblesdale Stakes at Royal Ascot. She came from last place on the final turn to finish second of the six runners, two and a half lengths behind the winner Alydaress.

On 8 July, Roseate Tern was dropped in class for the Group Three Lancashire Oaks at Haydock and started 7/4 favourite against seven opponents. As Carson was partnering Nashwan in the Eclipse Stakes at Sandown the filly was ridden for the first time by Tony Ives. Her main rival in the betting was Knoosh, who had finished two places behind her at Epsom, whilst the other runners included the Cheshire Oaks winner Braiswick. After being fifth early in the straight she took the lead a furlong out and belatedly recorded her first success, beating Lucky Song by half a length with Wrapping two and a half lengths back in third. Roseate Tern reappeared on 23 August for the Group One Yorkshire Oaks in which she was reunited with Carson. Alydaress, who had beaten Aliysa in the Irish Oaks was made the odds-on favourite with Roseate Tern second choice at odds of 11/2. The other three runners were Petite Ile (third in the Irish Oaks), Lady Shipley (runner-up in the Nassau Stakes) and the Oaks d'Italia winner Nydrion. Carson restrained the filly at the rear of the five-runner field as Lady Shipley made the running from Nydrion, Petite Ile and Alydaress. She began to make steady progress in the straight, overtook the fading Lady Shipley a furlong out and won by one and a half lengths and a head from Alydaress and Petite Ile.

On her final start of the season Roseate Tern was matched against colts in the St Leger Stakes and started the 5/2 second favourite behind the Henry Cecil-trained Michelozzo. The St Leger meeting at Doncaster was abandoned owing to the poor state of the course and the race was run a week later at Ayr Racecourse. After being held up by Carson in the early stages the filly made steady progress without looking likely to win and finished third behind Michelozzo and Sapience, with Terimon in fourth place.

At the end of the year, the filly was bought privately by the American businessman Peter Brant and moved to the stable of Luca Cumani at Newmarket.

=== 1990: four-year-old season ===
On her first appearance as a four-year-old Roseate Tern was ridden by Frankie Dettori in the Group Two Jockey Club Stakes over one and a half miles at Newmarket on 4 May and started third choice in the betting behind Brush Aside (an eight length winner of the John Porter Stakes on his previous start) and Assatis (Hardwicke Stakes, Gran Premio del Jockey Club). The other runners included Ile de Nisky (fourth in The Derby) and Sesame (St Simon Stakes). Brush Aside led the field before Assatis went to the front three furlongs out, but Roseate Tern gained the advantage a furlong from the finish and won by two lengths from Ile de Nisky. Five weeks later she started 5/2 second favourite for the Group One Coronation Cup at Epsom but finished fourth behind In The Wings, Observation Point and her half-brother Ibn Bey.

After a three month break, Roseate Tern returned for the September Stakes over eleven furlongs at Kempton Park Racecourse for which she started favourite but was beaten two lengths into second by three-year-old colt Lord of the Field. In October she was sent to Canada to contest the Rothmans International at Woodbine Racetrack but made little impact, finishing ninth of the ten runners behind French Glory.

== Breeding record ==
Roseate Tern was retired from racing to become a broodmare for Hamdan Al Maktoum's Shadwell Farm. She died in 2007. Roseate Tern produced at least nine foals between 1993 and 2005:

- Min Elreeh, a dark bay or brown filly, foaled in 1993, sired by Danzig. Unplaced on only start.
- Siyadah, chestnut, filly, 1994, by Mr Prospector. Raced in Britain and the United States: won Pretty Polly Stakes.
- Fakhr, dark bay or brown colt, 1995, by Riverman. Won one race.
- Za Aamah, chestnut filly, 1996, by Mr Prospector. Unraced.
- Nabadhaat, dark bay or brown filly, 1997, by Mr Prospector. Failed to win in five races.
- Esloob, bay filly, 1999, by Diesis. Won three races including the Pretty Polly Stakes and Hoppings Stakes.
- Tarwij, dark bay or brown filly, 2000, by Diesis. Failed to win in two races.
- Majaales, bay colt (later gelded), 2003, by Diesis. Won five races.
- Wikaala, chestnut colt (later gelded), 2005, by Diesis. Won five races.

== Pedigree ==
Pedigree of Roseate Tern (GB), bay mare, 1986
Sire Blakeney (GB) 1966	Hethersett (GB); 1959	Hugh Lupus	Djebel
Sire Blakeney (GB) 1966	Hethersett (GB); 1959	Hugh Lupus	Sakountala
Sire Blakeney (GB) 1966	Hethersett (GB); 1959	Bride Elect	Big Game
Sire Blakeney (GB) 1966	Hethersett (GB); 1959	Bride Elect	Netherton Maid
Sire Blakeney (GB) 1966	Windmill Girl (GB); 1961	Hornbeam	Hyperion
Sire Blakeney (GB) 1966	Windmill Girl (GB); 1961	Hornbeam	Thicket
Sire Blakeney (GB) 1966	Windmill Girl (GB); 1961	Chorus Beauty	Chanteur
Sire Blakeney (GB) 1966	Windmill Girl (GB); 1961	Chorus Beauty	Neberna
Dam Rosia Bay (GB) 1977	High Top (IRE); 1969	Derring-Do	Darius
Dam Rosia Bay (GB) 1977	High Top (IRE); 1969	Derring-Do	Sipsey Bridge
Dam Rosia Bay (GB) 1977	High Top (IRE); 1969	Camenae	Vimy
Dam Rosia Bay (GB) 1977	High Top (IRE); 1969	Camenae	Madrilene
Dam Rosia Bay (GB) 1977	Ouija (GB); 1971	Silly Season	Tom Fool
Dam Rosia Bay (GB) 1977	Ouija (GB); 1971	Silly Season	Double Deal
Dam Rosia Bay (GB) 1977	Ouija (GB); 1971	Samanda	Alycidon
Dam Rosia Bay (GB) 1977	Ouija (GB); 1971	Samanda	Gradisca (Family: 12-b)
