= Mountain Lodge (horse) =

British-bred Thoroughbred racehorse

- Sire: Blakeney
- Grandsire: Hethersett
- Dam: Riddlededee
- Damsire: Acropolis
- Sex: Mare
- Foaled: 15 March 1979
- Country: United Kingdom
- Colour: Bay or brown
- Breeder: Lord Halifax
- Owner: Lord Halifax
- Trainer: John Dunlop
- Record: 13: 5-1-2

Major wins
- Cesarewitch Handicap (1982); Irish St Leger (1983)

Awards
- Timeform rating 97 (1982), 120 (1983)

Mountain Lodge (15 March 1979 – after 2002) was a British Thoroughbred racehorse and broodmare. A specialist stayer she finished unplaced on her only start as a juvenile in 1981 but in the following year she won four races culminating with a victory in the Cesarewitch Handicap over two and a quarter miles. As a four-year-old she struggled for form early in the season but returned to her best in autumn to record her biggest victory in the Irish St Leger. Her win in Ireland made her the first older horse to win an Irish classic race. As a broodmare she produced several winners, the best of them being Compton Ace who won the Gordon Stakes and finished third in the Ascot Gold Cup. Through her daughter Beacon, she is the female-line ancestor of The Oaks winner Sariska.

== Background ==
Mountain Lodge was a "smallish" bay or brown mare bred at the Garrowby Stud in Yorkshire by her owner Peter Wood, 3rd Earl of Halifax. She was trained throughout her racing career by John Dunlop at Arundel in West Sussex.

She was sired by Blakeney, who won The Derby in 1969 before being retired to the National Stud. His other major winners included Julio Mariner, Juliette Marny and Tyrnavos. Blakeney was a representative of the Byerley Turk sire line, unlike more than 95% of modern thoroughbreds, who descend directly from the Darley Arabian. Mountain Lodge's dam Fiddlededee was a winning stayer who finished third in the Park Hill Stakes and was a daughter of Eyewash, whose other female-line descendants have included Might and Power, Lucky Owners and Beauty Parlour.

== Racing career ==
=== 1981: two-year-old season ===
Mountain Lodge made her racecourse debut in a 27-runner maiden race over six furlongs at Newmarket Racecourse in October and finished unplaced behind Merlin's Charm. In their annual Racehorses of 1981, the independent Timeform organisation described her as a filly who was likely to improve given "a good test of stamina".

=== 1982: three-year-old season ===
On her first two races as a three-year-old Mountain Lodge finished third and second before winning a maiden race over two miles at Nottingham Racecourse. She then "trotted up" in a minor race over the same distance at Thirsk Racecourse. She was unplaced on her next start but then won a handicap race over two and a quarter miles at Ayr Racecourse by a neck from the colt Dudley Wood. In October the filly started at odds of 9/1 in a 28-runner field for the Cesarewitch Handicap over two and a quarter miles at Newmarket. Ridden by Willie Carson, and carrying a weight of 108 pounds, she won by three lengths from the seven-year-old gelding Popsi's Joy who had won the race in 1980. At the end of the year he was given a rating of 97 by Timeform, 37 behind their top stayer Ardross and 34 pounds behind their best three-year-old filly Akiyda.

=== 1983: four-year-old season ===
Mountain Lodge was kept in training as a four-year-old with the Ascot Gold Cup in June as her principal objective. She missed a scheduled run in the Sagaro Stakes when the race meeting was abandoned due to waterlogging and made her seasonal debut in the Henry II Stakes at Sandown Park in May when she finished fourth to Ore. Her Gold Cup hopes were ended when she sustained a foot injury on the day of the race and had to be withdrawn. Later that month she contested the Northumberland Plate at Newcastle Racecourse but raced poorly and finished unplaced behind Weavers' Pin.

After a break of well over two months Mountain Lodge returned in the Doncaster Cup in September and came from well off the pace to finish third behind Karadar and Gildoran. The 1983 Irish St Leger, run over one and three quarter miles at the Curragh Racecourse on 8 October, was the first edition of the race to be open to older horses instead of being restricted to three-year-olds. Heavy rain in the build-up resulted in very soft ground and conditions were not improved by a thick mist which restricted visibility. The British colt Band (winner of the Cumberland Lodge Stakes) started favourite ahead of Colonial Flag (representing the Vincent O'Brien stable) and Yawa (Grand Prix de Paris) with Mountain Lodge, who was expected to relish the testing conditions, next in the betting on 13/2. The best of the other six runners appeared to be the British four-year-old Khairpour, who had finished ahead of Mountain Lodge at Sandown and later won the Geoffrey Freer Stakes. Little of the early stages were clearly visible but High Cannon appeared to make the running before Arctic Lord led the field into the straight. Band went to the front in the straight, but Mountain Lodge, ridden by Declan Gillespie, wore down the tiring favourite in the final furlong and won going away by two lengths.

On her only subsequent start Mountain Lodge was sent to France for the Prix Royal-Oak at Longchamp Racecourse on 30 October. She appeared unsuited by the firm ground and finished ninth behind Old Country.

At the end of 1983 Mountain Lodge was rated 120 by Timeform, seven pounds behind their best stayer Little Wolf.

== Breeding record ==
After her retirement from racing Mountain Lodge became a broodmare for Lord Halifax's stud. She produced at least sixteen foals and five winners between 1985 and 2002:

- Turbine Blade, a bay colt, foaled in 1985, sired by Kings Lake. Won three races.
- Evelani, chestnut filly, 1986, by Chief Singer. Unraced.
- Beacon, bay filly, 1987, by High Top. Unraced: grand-dam of Sariska.
- Uluru, bay colt (later gelded), 1988, by Kris. Won one flat races and six National Hunt races.
- Tree Frog, bay filly, 1989, by Lomond. Failed to win in four races.
- Mountain Willow, bay filly, 1990, by Doyoun. Won one race.
- High Kicker, bay colt (gelded), 1991, by Salse. Faile to win in three races.
- Snow Valley, bay colt, 1992, by Shirley Heights. Failed to win in seven races.
- Clara House, bay filly, 1994, by Shirley Heights. Failed to win in two races.
- Crows Nest, bay filly, 1995, by Shirley Heights. Failed to win in six races.
- Compton Ace, chestnut colt, 1996, by Pharly. Won two races including the Gordon Stakes.
- High Barn, bay filly, 1997, by Shirley Heights. Failed to win in five races.
- Mayville Thunder, chestnut colt, 1998, by Zilzal. Won two races.
- Tainwell, chestnut colt (gelded), 1999, by Most Welcome. Failed to win in five races.
- Molehill, bay filly, 2001, by Salse. Failed to win in five races.
- Scottendale, chestnut filly, 2002, by Zilzal. Failed to win in three races.

== Pedigree ==
Pedigree of Mountain Lodge (GB), bay or brown mare, 1979
Sire Blakeney (GB) 1966	Hethersett (GB); 1959	Hugh Lupus	Djebel
Sire Blakeney (GB) 1966	Hethersett (GB); 1959	Hugh Lupus	Sakountala
Sire Blakeney (GB) 1966	Hethersett (GB); 1959	Bride Elect	Big Game
Sire Blakeney (GB) 1966	Hethersett (GB); 1959	Bride Elect	Netherton Maid
Sire Blakeney (GB) 1966	Windmill Girl (GB); 1961	Hornbeam	Hyperion
Sire Blakeney (GB) 1966	Windmill Girl (GB); 1961	Hornbeam	Thicket
Sire Blakeney (GB) 1966	Windmill Girl (GB); 1961	Chorus Beauty	Chanteur
Sire Blakeney (GB) 1966	Windmill Girl (GB); 1961	Chorus Beauty	Neberna
Dam Fiddlededee (GB) 1967	Acropolis (GB); 1952	Donatello	Blenheim
Dam Fiddlededee (GB) 1967	Acropolis (GB); 1952	Donatello	Delleana
Dam Fiddlededee (GB) 1967	Acropolis (GB); 1952	Aurora	Hyperion
Dam Fiddlededee (GB) 1967	Acropolis (GB); 1952	Aurora	Rose Red
Dam Fiddlededee (GB) 1967	Eyewash (GB); 1946	Blue Peter	Fairway
Dam Fiddlededee (GB) 1967	Eyewash (GB); 1946	Blue Peter	Fancy Free
Dam Fiddlededee (GB) 1967	Eyewash (GB); 1946	All Moonshine	Bobsleigh
Dam Fiddlededee (GB) 1967	Eyewash (GB); 1946	All Moonshine	Selene (Family: 6-e)
