= 1980 Epsom Derby =

- Derby
- Location: Epsom Downs Racecourse
- Date: 4 June 1980
- Winning horse: Henbit
- Starting price: 7/1
- Jockey: Willie Carson
- Trainer: Dick Hern
- Owner: Etti Plesch
- Conditions: Firm

Epsom Derby 1980
1-2-3
Henbit	Master Willie	Rankin

Also Ran
4-5-6
Pelerin	Garrido	Hello Gorgeous
7-8-9
Julius Caesar	Star Way	Saint Jonathon
10-11-12
Bozovici	Blast Off	Ribo Charter
13-14-15
Pimpont	Marcello	Tyrnavos
16-17-18
Running Mill	Water Mill	Prince Spruce
19-20-21
Noble Shamus	Nikoli	Moomba Masquerade
22-23-24
Monteverdi	Majestic Star	Braughing

The 1980 Epsom Derby was the 201st annual running of the Derby horse race. It took place at Epsom Downs Racecourse on 4 June 1980.

The race was won by Etti Plesch's American bred Henbit at odds of 7/1. Ridden by Willie Carson and trained at West Ilsley by Dick Hern, Henbit would be the second Derby winner in two years for the trainer/jockey duo. While the winning margin of just three quarters of a length was unremarkable, that Henbit returned with a fractured cannon bone in his off-fore leg, thought to have occurred a furlong and a half from the finish led his trainer to describe him as a "very brave horse". Furthermore, the winning time of 2:34.77 was the fastest since Nijinsky won in 1970.

== Race details ==
- Sponsor: none
- Winner's prize money: £166,820
- Going: Fast
- Number of runners: 24
- Winner's time: 2 minutes, 34.77 seconds

== Full result ==
Finish	Horse	Bred	Jockey	Trainer	Trained	SP
1st	Henbit	USA	Willie Carson	Dick Hern	UK	7/1
2nd	Master Willie	GB	Philip Waldron	Henry Candy	UK	22/1
3rd	Rankin	FR	Greville Starkey	Guy Harwood	UK	14/1
4th	Pelerin	FR	Pat Eddery	Harry Wragg	UK	18/1
5th	Garrido	ITY	Philippe Paquet	François Boutin	FR	28/1
6th	Hello Gorgeous	USA	Joe Mercer	Henry Cecil	UK	9/1
7th	Julius Caesar	FR	Paul Cook	Serge Boullenger	FR	50/1
8th	Nikoli	GB	Christy Roche	Paddy Prendergast	IRE	4/1
9th	Star Way	GB	Yves Saint-Martin	Paul Kelleway	UK	22/1
10th	Water Mill	GB	Tony Murray	Dick Hern	UK	14/1
11th	Moomba Masquerade	GB	Geoff Baxter	Jeremy Hindley	UK	40/1
12th	Tyrnavos	GB	Edward Hide	Bruce Hobbs	UK	9/1
13th	Saint Jonathon	GB	Steve Cauthen	Barry Hills	UK	33/1
14th	Monteverdi	GB	Lester Piggott	Vincent O'Brien	IRE	8/1
15th	Prince Spruce	USA	John Matthias	John Dunlop	UK	200/1
16th	Bozovici	USA	Brian Taylor	Ryan Price	UK	7/1
17th	Braughing	GB	Kipper Lynch	Clive Brittain	UK	200/1
18th	Blast Off	USA	Maurice Philipperon	John Fellows	FR	66/1
19th	Noble Shamus	GB	George McGrath	M Fogarty	IRE	100/1
20th	Ribo Charter	GB	Tommy Carberry	Paul Kelleway	UK	100/1
21st	Running Mill	GB	Tony Kimberley	Michael Stoute	UK	100/1
22nd	Pimpont	FR	Georges Doleuze	Charles Milbank	FR	40/1
23rd	Marcello	FR	Brian Rouse	Clive Brittain	UK	200/1
24th	Majestic Star	GB	John Reid	Gavin Pritchard-Gordon	UK	33/1

== Winner details ==
Further details of the winner, Henbit:

- Foaled: 28 March 1977, in America
- Sire: Hawaii; Dam: Chateaucreek (Chateaugay)
- Owner: Etti Plesch
- Breeder: Helen Drake Jones

== Form analysis ==
=== Two-year-old races ===
Notable runs by the future Derby participants as two-year-olds in 1979:

- Blast Off - 2nd in Prix Greffulhe
- Bozovici - 2nd in Seaton Delaval Stakes
- Braughing - 3rd in Gimcrack Stakes
- Hello Gorgeous - 1st in Futurity Stakes, 1st in Royal Lodge Stakes
- Master Willie - 2nd in Acomb Stakes
- Moomba Masquerade - 3rd in Futurity Stakes
- Monteverdi – 1st in National Stakes, 1st in Dewhurst Stakes
- Noble Shamus – 1st in Railway Stakes, 3rd in National Stakes
- Rankin - 1st in Solario Stakes
- Ribo Charter – 3rd in Prix de Condé
- Star Way - 1st in Chesham Stakes, 2nd in Royal Lodge Stakes, 3rd in Seaton Delaval Stakes
- Tyrnavos - 2nd in Dewhurst Stakes, 1st in Roberre Trophy Stakes
- Water Mill - 2nd in Horris Hill Stakes

=== The road to Epsom ===
Early-season appearances in 1980 and trial races prior to running in the Derby:

- Garrido - 1st in Derby Italiano
- Hello Gorgeous - 1st in Dante Stakes
- Henbit - 1st in Guardian Classic Trial, 1st in Chester Vase
- Julius Caesar - 1st in Prix Noailles
- Master Willie - 1st in Easter Stakes, 2nd in Dante Stakes
- Monteverdi – 2nd in Greenham Stakes, 2nd in McCairns Trial Stakes
- Moomba Masquerade - 2nd in Chester Vase
- Nikoli - 1st in Irish 2000 Guineas, 1st in McCairns Trial Stakes
- Pelerin - 1st in Glasgow Stakes
- Rankin - 2nd in Predominate Stakes
- Ribo Charter - 2nd in Lingfield Derby Trial
- Running Mill - 1st in Heath Stakes
- Saint Jonathon - 1st in Roseberry Stakes
- Star Way - 2nd in Craven Stakes
- Tyrnavos - 1st in Craven Stakes
- Water Mill - 3rd in Dante Stakes

=== Subsequent Group 1 wins ===
Group 1 / Grade I victories after running in the Derby.

- Master Willie - Benson and Hedges Gold Cup (1980), Coronation Cup (1981), Eclipse Stakes (1981)
- Pelerin - Grosser Preis von Baden (1981)
- Tyrnavos – Irish Derby (1980)

== Subsequent breeding careers ==
Leading progeny of participants in the 1980 Epsom Derby.

=== Stallions of Classic winners ===
Star Way (9th) Exported to New Zealand - Sire of 18 Group One winners

- Shankhill Lass - 1st The Thousand Guineas (1985)
- Waverley Star - 2nd Cox Plate (1986)
- Nimue - 1st New Zealand 1000 Guineas (1992)
- Shoal Creek - Dam of Encosta De Lago

=== Stallions of Group/Grade One winners ===
Master Willie (2nd)

- Hollywood Dream - 1st Premio Presidente della Repubblica (1996), 1st Deutschland-Preis (1996)
- Make A Stand - 1st Champion Hurdle (1997)
- Jungle Gold - 3rd Irish 1000 Guineas (1988)
- Be My Master - 2nd Derby Italiano (1986

=== Stallions of National Hunt horses ===
Henbit (1st)

- Kribensis - 1st Champion Hurdle (1990)
- Sybillin - 2nd Christmas Hurdle (1990)

Julius Caesar (7th)

- Soir de Mai - 1st Prix Georges de Talhouët-Roy (1988)
- Runway Romance - 2nd Anniversary Hurdle (1991)

=== Other Stallions ===
Tyrnavos (12th) - Dihistan (1st 1986 Hardwicke Stakes), Andrios (2nd 1984 Chesham Stakes), Akaaleel (2nd 1985 Chesham Stakes), Tartamuda (Dam of Tartak)
Hello Gorgeous (6th) - Libertine (3rd 1987 Poule d'Essai des Pouliches), Franco Forte (2nd 1987 Premio Parioli) - later exported to Brazil
Monteverdi (14th) - Exported to America - Exported to Venevuela - Concert Hall (2nd 1984 National Stakes), Laird Of Montrose (3rd 1985 Middle Park Stakes)
Nikoli (8th) - Exported to America - Exported to Uruguay - Air Display (2nd 1986 Hollywood Derby)
Water Mill (10th) - Exported to Australia - Innocent Lady (Dam of Justice Prevails)
Moomba Masquerade (11th) - Exported to South Africa
Saint Johnathon (13th) - Exported to Australia
Prince Spruce (15th) - Exported to Italy
Blast Off (18th) - Exported to Venezuela
Noble Shamus (19th) - Exported to America
Running Mill (21st) - Exported to Turkey
Marcello (23rd) - Exported to Argentina
