= 1980 in sports =

1980 in sports describes the year's events in world sport.

== Alpine skiing ==
- Alpine Skiing World Cup:
  - Men's overall season champion: Andreas Wenzel, Liechtenstein
  - Women's overall season champion: Hanni Wenzel, Liechtenstein
- January 12 – Canada's Ken Read, the leader of the "Crazy Canucks" ski team, wins the Hahnenkamm downhill in Kitzbühel, Austria, becoming the second North American to ever win the classic race.

== American football ==
- January 20 − Super Bowl XIV: the Pittsburgh Steelers (AFC) won 31–19 over the Los Angeles Rams (NFC)
  - Location: Rose Bowl
  - Attendance: 103,985
  - MVP: Terry Bradshaw, QB (Pittsburgh)
- Sugar Bowl (1979 season):
  - The Alabama Crimson Tide won 24–9 over the Arkansas Razorbacks to claim the college football national championship
- December 21: The New Orleans Saints became the NFL's first ever 1–15 team

== Association football ==
- European Championship – West Germany 2–1 Belgium
- European Cup – Nottingham Forest 1–0 Hamburg
- UEFA Cup – 2 legs, Borussia Mönchengladbach 3–2 Eintracht Frankfurt; Eintracht Frankfurt 1–0 Borussia Mönchengladbach, 3–3 on aggregate, Frankfurt win on away goals
- Cup Winners' Cup – Valencia 0–0 Arsenal (AET), Valencia won 5–4 on penalties
- England – FA Cup – West Ham United won 1–0 over Arsenal
- Newport County AFC win Welsh Cup for first time.

== Athletics ==
- March 31 – death of Jesse Owens, American sprinter who won four gold medals at the Berlin Olympics in 1936
- June 12 – Soviet Union's Nadiya Olizarenko sets the world record in the women's 800 metres, clocking 1:54.85 at Moscow
- July 27 – Nadiya Olizarenko betters her own world record in the women's 800 metres at the 1980 Summer Olympics in Moscow, clocking 1:53.43.

== Australian rules football ==
- Victorian Football League
  - Richmond wins the 84th VFL Premiership (Richmond 23.21 (159) d Collingwood 9.24 (78))
  - Brownlow Medal awarded to Kelvin Templeton (Footscray)

== Baseball ==
- September 18 – Outfielder Gary Ward become the sixth Minnesota Twins player to hit for the cycle. The Twins lose 9–8 to the Milwaukee Brewers, wasting Ward's effort. On May 26, 2004 his son, Daryle Ward, will repeat the feat guiding the Pirates' 11–8 victory over the Cardinals. Ward joined his father to become the first father-son combination in major league history to hit for the cycle.
- Rollie Fingers breaks Hoyt Wilhelm's major league record of 250 saves
- 1980 World Series – The Philadelphia Phillies of the National League end 97 years of frustration by defeating the American League champion Kansas City Royals four games to two, for the Phillies' first-ever World Championship.
- Japan's Sadaharu Oh retires from the Yomiuri Giants as the all time professional baseball home run king.

== Basketball ==
NBA Finals

- Los Angeles Lakers win four games to two over the Philadelphia 76ers

National Basketball League (Australia) Finals

- St. Kilda Saints defeated the West Adelaide Bearcats 113–88 in the final.

== Boxing ==
- March 14–22 members of the United States Olympic boxing team died in a plane crash near Warsaw, Poland
- June 20- Roberto Durán defeats Sugar Ray Leonard by a 15-round decision to win boxing's WBC world Welterweight title.
- August 2- Thomas Hearns defeats José "Pipino" Cuevas by a knockout in round 2 to win boxing's WBA world Welterweight title and Yasutsune Uehara knocks out Samuel Serrano in round six to win the WBA's world Jr. Lightweight title in Detroit
- In Cincinnati, Aaron Pryor defeats Antonio Cervantes by a knockout in round four to win the WBA's world Jr. Welterweight title.
- October 2- Larry Holmes defeats Muhammad Ali by a knockout in round eleven to retain boxing's WBC world Heavyweight title, in what would be Ali's last world title bout.
- November 25- In The No Más Fight, in New Orleans, Louisiana, Sugar Ray Leonard recovers the WBC's world Welterweight championship with an eight-round technical knockout of Roberto Durán.

== Canadian football ==
- Grey Cup – Edmonton Eskimos win 48–10 over the Hamilton Tiger-Cats
- Vanier Cup – Alberta Golden Bears win 40–21 over the Ottawa Gee-Gees

== Cycling ==
- Giro d'Italia won by Bernard Hinault of France
- Tour de France – Joop Zoetemelk of the Netherlands
- UCI Road World Championships – Men's road race – Bernard Hinault of France

== Disc sports ==
- Disc ultimate league play begins in Toronto with the formation of the Toronto Ultimate League

== Dog sledding ==
- Iditarod Trail Sled Dog Race Champion –
  - Joe May won with lead dogs: Wilbur & Cora Gray

== Field hockey ==
- Men's Champions Trophy held in Karachi and won by Pakistan
- Olympic Games (Men's Competition) won by India
- Olympic Games (Women's Competition) won by Zimbabwe

== Figure skating ==
- World Figure Skating Championships –
  - Men's champion: Jan Hoffmann, Germany
  - Ladies' champion: Anett Pötzsch, Germany
  - Pair skating champions: Marina Cherkasova & Sergei Shakhrai, Soviet Union
  - Ice dancing champions: Krisztina Regőczy & András Sallay, Hungary

== Gaelic Athletic Association ==
- Camogie
  - All-Ireland Camogie Champion: Cork
  - National Camogie League: Kilkenny
- Gaelic football
  - All-Ireland Senior Football Championship – Kerry 1–9 died Roscommon 1–6
  - National Football League – Cork 0–11 died Kerry 0–10
- Ladies' Gaelic football
  - All-Ireland Senior Football Champion: Tipperary
  - National Football League: Kerry
- Hurling
  - All-Ireland Senior Hurling Championship – Galway 2–15 died Limerick 3–9
  - National Hurling League – Cork 2–10 4–15 beat Limerick 2–10 4–6

== Golf ==
Men's professional

- The Senior PGA Tour (now called Champions Tour) is founded.
- Masters Tournament – Seve Ballesteros
- U.S. Open – Jack Nicklaus
- British Open – Tom Watson
- PGA Championship – Jack Nicklaus
- PGA Tour money leader – Tom Watson – $530,808
- Senior PGA Tour – money leader – Don January – $44,100

Men's amateur

- British Amateur – Duncan Evans
- U.S. Amateur – Hal Sutton

Women's professional

- LPGA Championship – Sally Little
- U.S. Women's Open – Amy Alcott
- Classique Peter Jackson Classic – Pat Bradley
- LPGA Tour money leader – Beth Daniel – $231,000

== Harness racing ==
- Superhorse, Niatross wins the United States Pacing Triple Crown races –
  1. Cane Pace – Niatross
  2. Little Brown Jug – Niatross
  3. Messenger Stakes – Niatross
- United States Trotting Triple Crown races –
  1. Hambletonian – Burgomeister
  2. Yonkers Trot – Nevele Impulse
  3. Kentucky Futurity – Final Score
- Australian Inter Dominion Harness Racing Championship –
  - Pacers: Koala King
  - Trotters: Hano Direct

== Horse racing ==
Steeplechases

- Cheltenham Gold Cup – Master Smudge
- Grand National – Ben Nevis

Flat races

- Australia – Melbourne Cup won by Beldale Ball
- Canada – Queen's Plate won by Driving Home
- France – Prix de l'Arc de Triomphe won by Detroit
- Ireland – Irish Derby Stakes won by Tyrnavos
- English Triple Crown Races:
  1. 2,000 Guineas Stakes – Known Fact
  2. The Derby – Henbit
  3. St. Leger Stakes – Light Cavalry
- United States Triple Crown Races:
  1. Kentucky Derby – Genuine Risk
  2. Preakness Stakes – Codex
  3. Belmont Stakes – Temperance Hill

== Ice hockey ==
- New York Islanders win Stanley Cup on Bobby Nystrom's overtime goal in game six of the Final over the Philadelphia Flyers.
- The United States men's ice hockey team defeats the Soviet Union en route to the gold medal in what is known as the Miracle on Ice.

== Olympic Games ==
- 1980 Summer Olympics takes place in Moscow, USSR (July 19 - August 3)
  - USSR wins the most medals (195), and the most gold medals (80).
- 1980 Winter Olympics takes place in Lake Placid, United States (February 13 - February 24)
  - GDR wins the most medals (23), and the USSR wins the most gold medals (10).

== Radiosport ==
- First amateur radio direction finding world championships held in Cetniewo, Poland.

== Rugby league ==
- 1980 Kangaroo tour of New Zealand
- 8 July – The inaugural 1980 State of Origin game is won by Queensland who defeat New South Wales 20–10 at Lang Park
- 1980 European Rugby League Championship
- 1980 New Zealand rugby league season
- 1979–80 Northern Rugby Football League season
- 1980 NSWRFL season
- 1980–81 Rugby Football League season
- 1980 Tooth Cup

== Rugby union ==
- 86th Five Nations Championship series is won by England who complete the Grand Slam

== Snooker ==
- World Snooker Championship – Cliff Thorburn beats Alex Higgins 18–16, becoming the first non-UK player to win the title
- World rankings – Ray Reardon remains world number one for 1980/81

== Speed skating ==
- February 19 - Eric Heiden skates Olympics record 1000 meter in 1 15.18

== Swimming ==
- XXII Olympic Games, held in Moscow, Soviet Union (July 20 – July 27)
- February 2 – USA's Chris Cavanaugh sets a world record in the 50m freestyle (long course) at a swimming meet in Amersfoort, Netherlands, shaving off 0.04 of the previous record (23.70) set by Germany's Klaus Steinbach nearly a year ago: 23.66.
- April 10 – Chris Cavanaugh betters his own world record in the 50m freestyle (long course) at a swimming meet in Austin, Texas (USA): 23.12. At the same event (and on the same day), two other swimmers from the United States, Rowdy Gaines and Bruce Stahl, go under his time, clocking 22.96 and 22.83 respectively.
- August 15 – USA's Joe Bottom betters the world record in the 50m freestyle (long course) at a meet in Honolulu, Hawaii, shaving off 0.12 of the previous record (22.83) set by Bruce Stahl four months earlier: 22.71.

== Tennis ==
- April 16 - Arthur Ashe retires from professional tennis
- Grand Slam in tennis men's results:
  1. Australian Open – Brian Teacher
  2. French Open – Björn Borg
  3. Wimbledon championships – Björn Borg
  4. U.S. Open – John McEnroe
- Grand Slam in tennis women's results:
  1. Australian Open – Hana Mandlíková
  2. French Open – Chris Evert
  3. Wimbledon championships – Evonne Goolagong Cawley
  4. U.S. Open – Chris Evert
- Davis Cup World tennis – Czechoslovakia defeated Italy 4–1.

== Water polo ==
- Water polo at the 1980 Summer Olympics won by USSR

== Yacht racing ==
- The New York Yacht Club retains the America's Cup as Freedom defeats challenger Australia, of the Royal Perth Yacht Club, 4 races to 1

== Awards ==
- ABC's Wide World of Sports Athlete of the Year: U.S. Olympic Hockey Team
- Associated Press Male Athlete of the Year – U.S. Olympic hockey team, Amateur Ice Hockey
- Associated Press Female Athlete of the Year – Chris Evert, Tennis
