= Blakeney (horse) =

British-bred Thoroughbred racehorse and sire (1966–1992)

- Racing silks of Arthur Budgett
- Sire: Hethersett
- Grandsire: Hugh Lupus
- Dam: Windmill Girl
- Damsire: Hornbeam
- Sex: Stallion
- Foaled: 1966
- Country: United Kingdom
- Colour: Bay
- Breeder: Arthur Budgett
- Owner: Arthur Budgett
- Trainer: Arthur Budgett
- Record: 12: 3-3-0
- Earnings: £83,655

Major wins
- Epsom Derby (1969); Ormonde Stakes (1970); Timeform rating: 126
- Last updated on 30 July 2024

Blakeney (28 March 1966 – 6 November 1992) was a British Thoroughbred racehorse and sire. He won the Derby at Epsom in 1969 and was kept in training in 1970 aged four. He later had a successful stud career.

== Background ==
Blakeney was bred by his owner and trainer Arthur Budgett at Kirtlington, Oxfordshire. He was the first of two Derby winners produced by the Oaks runner-up Windmill Girl, the other being Morston who won the race in 1973. His sire, Hethersett, was a top class racehorse who won the St Leger in 1962. Hethersett and Blakeney are representatives of the Byerley Turk sire line, unlike more than 95% of modern thoroughbreds, who descend directly from the Darley Arabian.

Blakeney, who was named after a village in Norfolk, was sent to the Newmarket Sales as a yearling. Shortly before the sale the colt was kicked by another horse and the resulting swelling deterred potential buyers so that he failed to reach his reserve price of 5,000gns. Budgett therefore decided to train the colt himself at his Whatcombe Stables near Wantage. The colt's one eccentricity was that he refused to enter a horse box in the usual way, preferring to go in backwards.

== Racing career ==
=== 1968: two-year-old season ===
Blakeney did not appear on the racecourse until the autumn of his first season. In September he finished fourth in the Clarence House Stakes at Ascot behind the future Coronation Cup winner Caliban. A month later, Blakeney, ridden by Ernie Johnson, recorded his first victory by winning the twenty-seven runner race at Newmarket.

During the winter, Budgett claimed that he turned down a "big American offer" for the colt and backed him for the Derby at odds of 100/1.

=== 1969: three-year-old season ===
Blakeney took time to reach his peak in the spring of 1969, and did not appear until two weeks before the Derby, when he ran in the Lingfield Derby Trial. Ridden by Geoff Lewis, he had problems finding a clear run, but then finished strongly to finish second to The Elk. The performance convinced some observers that the colt had been a "desperately unlucky" loser and was a serious contender for the Derby.

At Epsom, Blakeney was reunited with the twenty-one-year-old Ernie Johnson, who had been promised the ride after the win at Newmarket, and started at odds of 15/2. He was held up in the early stages as the pace was set by Moon Mountain. In the straight, Johnson made his challenge on the inside and drove Blakeney through a gap along the rails to take the lead inside the final furlong. The colt ran on strongly to win by a length from Shoemaker, with Prince Regent third. After the race, Budgett described himself as "the luckiest man in the world."

In his three remaining starts in 1969, Blakeney failed to reproduce his Derby-winning form. In the Irish Derby at the end of June he finished fourth of the fifteen runners behind Prince Regent. Blakeney did not have a particularly clear run in the St Leger in September, but his fifth place behind Intermezzo was a disappointment. On his final start he ran unplaced behind Levmoss in the Prix de l'Arc de Triomphe.

=== 1970: four-year-old season ===
Blakeney started his four-year-old season disappointingly, finishing fifth in the Jockey Club Stakes at Newmarket in April. In May he recorded his first win since the Derby when taking the Ormonde Stakes at Chester. Budgett then took the unusual decision to move Blakeney up in distance for the two and a half mile Ascot Gold Cup, a race which had not been won by a Derby winner since Ocean Swell in 1945. He appeared to cope with the extreme distance, but finished second, beaten three quarters of a length by Precipice Wood.

Blakeney's best performance of the year came in defeat, when he ran in the King George VI and Queen Elizabeth Stakes at Ascot in July. Although he was no threat to the odds on favourite Nijinsky he kept on well under pressure to finish second, four lengths clear of the other runners who included Caliban (Coronation Cup), Crepellana (Prix de Diane) and the Washington, D.C. International winner Karabas. On his final start he improved on his 1969 effort in the Prix de l’Arc de Triomphe, finishing fifth of the twenty-four runners behind Sassafras.

== Assessment ==
Timeform rated Blakeney at 123 as a three-year-old (their lowest rating for a Derby winner) and 126 as a four-year-old.

In their book A Century of Champions, John Randall and Tony Morris rated Blakeney a “poor” Derby winner. Randall, writing in the Racing Post, rated Blakeney the third worst Derby winner since 1945.

Arthur Budgett called him "a bloody good horse."

== Stud career ==
Blakeney stood as a stallion at the National Stud at Newmarket, where was later joined by his fellow Derby winners Mill Reef and Grundy. He made a successful start to his stud career, getting the Oaks winner Juliette Marny in his first crop of foals. His other notable winners included Julio Mariner, Tyrnavos, Mountain Lodge and Roseate Tern. Through his daughter Percy's Lass, he is the broodmare sire of the Derby winner Sir Percy.

Blakeney was euthanized on 6 November 1992 and is buried at the National Stud.

== Sire line tree ==
- Blakeney
  - Norfolk Air
  - Charlotte's Choice
  - Coloso
    - Colosal
  - Julio Mariner
    - Sir Galahad
  - Roscoe Blake
  - Sexton Blake
    - Jung
  - Commodore Blake
  - Sheringham
  - Tyrnavos
    - Dihistan
  - Electric
    - Petrullo
    - Travelling Light
  - Band
  - Castle Rising
    - Abbas
  - Just David
  - Satco
    - Szolarisz
  - Dragon Negro
  - La Yegua
    - Toldeo

== Pedigree ==
Pedigree of Blakeney (GB), bay stallion, 1966
| Sire Hethersett (GB) 1959 | Hugh Lupus; 1952 | Djebel | Tourbillon |
| Sire Hethersett (GB) 1959 | Hugh Lupus; 1952 | Djebel | Loika |
| Sire Hethersett (GB) 1959 | Hugh Lupus; 1952 | Sakountala | Goya |
| Sire Hethersett (GB) 1959 | Hugh Lupus; 1952 | Sakountala | Samos |
| Sire Hethersett (GB) 1959 | Bride Elect; 1952 | Big Game | Bahram |
| Sire Hethersett (GB) 1959 | Bride Elect; 1952 | Big Game | Myrobella |
| Sire Hethersett (GB) 1959 | Bride Elect; 1952 | Netherton Maid | Nearco |
| Sire Hethersett (GB) 1959 | Bride Elect; 1952 | Netherton Maid | Phase |
| Dam Windmill Girl (GB) 1961 | Hornbeam; 1953 | Hyperion | Gainsborough |
| Dam Windmill Girl (GB) 1961 | Hornbeam; 1953 | Hyperion | Selene |
| Dam Windmill Girl (GB) 1961 | Hornbeam; 1953 | Thicket | Nasrullah |
| Dam Windmill Girl (GB) 1961 | Hornbeam; 1953 | Thicket | Thorn Wood |
| Dam Windmill Girl (GB) 1961 | Chorus Beauty; 1952 | Chanteur | Chateau Bouscaut |
| Dam Windmill Girl (GB) 1961 | Chorus Beauty; 1952 | Chanteur | La Diva |
| Dam Windmill Girl (GB) 1961 | Chorus Beauty; 1952 | Neberna | Nearco |
| Dam Windmill Girl (GB) 1961 | Chorus Beauty; 1952 | Neberna | Springtime (Family: 20-c) |
