= Juliette Marny =

British-bred Thoroughbred racehorse

- Racing silks of James Morrison
- Sire: Blakeney
- Grandsire: Hethersett
- Dam: Set Free
- Damsire: Worden
- Sex: Mare
- Foaled: 1972
- Country: United Kingdom
- Colour: Bay
- Breeder: Fonthill Stud
- Owner: James Ian Morrison
- Trainer: Jeremy Tree
- Record: 7:3-0-1

Major wins
- Lingfield Oaks Trial (1975); Oaks Stakes (1975); Irish Oaks (1975)

Awards
- Timeform rating 123

Juliette Marny (20 March 1972 – 25 October 1996) was a British Thoroughbred racehorse and broodmare best known for winning the classic Epsom Oaks in 1975. After being beaten in both her races as a two-year-old and disqualified on her three-year-old debut, the filly won the Lingfield Oaks Trial, the Oaks Stakes and Irish Oaks before her career was ended by injury in the Yorkshire Oaks. She was then retired to stud, where she had some success as a broodmare.

== Background ==
Juliette Marny was a bay mare with no white markings bred in Wiltshire by the Fonthill Stud which was managed by James Ian Morrison, the filly's owner throughout her racing career. She was from the first crop of foals sired by Blakeney the winner of the 1969 Epsom Derby, who was standing at the National Stud. Juliette Marny's dam Set Free, was in fact the first mare covered in Blakeney's first season at stud after the inexperienced stallion reportedly "took a while to realise was what required of him".

Set Free was a moderate racehorse, with a best Timeform rating of 90, but she became an outstanding broodmare. In 1975 she produced the St Leger Stakes winner Julio Mariner (also by Blakeney) and in the following year she foaled Scintillate a filly who won the Oaks in 1979.

The filly, named after the heroine of the novel I Will Repay, was sent into training with Jeremy Tree at Beckhampton in Wiltshire.

== Racing career ==
=== 1974: two-year-old season ===
Juliette Marny failed to win in two races as a two-year-old in 1974. She showed some promise on her second appearance when she finished second in a race at Salisbury Racecourse.

=== 1975: three-year-old season ===
On her first appearance as a three-year-old, Juliette Marny contested the Group Three Princess Elizabeth Stakes over eight and a half furlongs at Epsom Downs Racecourse in April. She finished first, beating Persian Market by two lengths, but was disqualified and placed last after veering to the left in the closing stages and causing interference. Her jockey, Greville Starkey was suspended for his performance and did not ride the filly again. In May, Juliette Marny was moved up in distance to contest the Oaks Trial over one and a half miles at Lingfield Park Racecourse. Ridden by Lester Piggott, she won by a head from Harmonise, a filly who was carrying five pounds more.

On 7 June, Juliette Marny contested the 197th running of the Oaks Stakes at Epsom and started at odds of 12/1 in a field of twelve fillies. Piggott had the choice of Tree's two entries and elected to ride Juliette Marny ahead of Jock Whitney's filly Brilliantine. Racing on firm ground, she took the lead a furlong from the finish and drew clear to win very easily by four lengths from Val's Girl with the favourite Moonlight Night in third. Piggott, who equaled the record of 21 British classic victories said: "We were never in any danger ... Juliette Marny was running away in the straight." Tree called the result "the highlight of my career."

In the Irish Oaks a month later at the Curragh, she was opposed by a field which included Nobiliary, a filly who had finished second to Grundy in The Derby. Juliette Marny ridden by Piggott (who could have ridden any of the three ) won by a neck from Tuscarora, with Nobiliary in third. In August, Juliette Marny was sent to York Racecourse for the Yorkshire Oaks. She finished third behind May Hill, sustaining a leg injury which ended her racing career.

== Assessment and honours ==
In 1975, the independent Timeform organisation gave Juliette Marny a rating of 123, placing her ten pounds behind the season's top rated three-year-old filly Rose Bowl. In their book, A Century of Champions, based on the Timeform rating system, John Randall and Tony Morris rated Juliette Marny an "inferior" winner of the Oaks.

== Breeding record ==
Juliette Marny was retired from racing to become a broodmare at Fonthill Stud, where she produced at least seven winners:

1978 Sans Dot (GB), bay filly, by Busted (GB) - 4th LR Sir Charles Clore Memorial Stakes, Newbury from 2 starts in England 1981

1979 North Briton (GB), bay colt, foaled 14 April, by Northfields (USA) - won two races from 28 starts in England

1980 Jolly Bay (GB), bay filly, by Mill Reef (USA) - won LR Pretty Polly Stakes from 4 starts in England 1983

1981 Aunt Judy (GB), chestnut filly, foaled 15 April, by Great Nephew (GB) - unplaced all six starts in Britain 1983–84

1988 Surrey Dancer (GB), bay colt, foaled 22 April, by Shareef Dancer (USA), won thirteen races

1989 July Girl (GB), bay filly, foaled 1 January, by Rousillon (USA), won Listed Premio Pietro Bessero

1991 Lac Ladoga (GB), chestnut colt, foaled 1 January, by Sharpo (GB), won one race from 6 starts in France 1995–97

1992 Duchess of Alba (GB), bay filly, foaled 13 May, by Belmez (USA) won one race from 4 starts in England 1995, dam of Nicobar (won Sandown Mile, Premio Emilio Turati, sire of Dunaden)

1994 Jaunty Jack (GB), bay colt, foaled 23 March, by Midyan (USA), won five races including Gran Premio d'Italia

Juliette Marny's daughter Sans Dot (by Busted failed to win a race but produced the Grade I winning hurdlers French Holly and Deano's Beeno. Juliette Marny was euthanized at the Foxhill Stud on 25 October 1996.

== Pedigree ==
Pedigree of Juliette Marny (GB), bay mare, 1972
Sire Blakeney (GB) 1966	Hethersett (GB); 1959	Hugh Lupus	Djebel
Sire Blakeney (GB) 1966	Hethersett (GB); 1959	Hugh Lupus	Sakountala
Sire Blakeney (GB) 1966	Hethersett (GB); 1959	Bride Elect	Big Game
Sire Blakeney (GB) 1966	Hethersett (GB); 1959	Bride Elect	Netherton Maid
Sire Blakeney (GB) 1966	Windmill Girl (GB); 1961	Hornbeam	Hyperion
Sire Blakeney (GB) 1966	Windmill Girl (GB); 1961	Hornbeam	Thicket
Sire Blakeney (GB) 1966	Windmill Girl (GB); 1961	Chorus Beauty	Chanteur
Sire Blakeney (GB) 1966	Windmill Girl (GB); 1961	Chorus Beauty	Neberna
Dam Set Free (GB) 1964	Worden (FR); 1949	Wild Risk	Rialto
Dam Set Free (GB) 1964	Worden (FR); 1949	Wild Risk	Wild Violet
Dam Set Free (GB) 1964	Worden (FR); 1949	Sans Tares	Sind
Dam Set Free (GB) 1964	Worden (FR); 1949	Sans Tares	Tara
Dam Set Free (GB) 1964	Emancipation (GB); 1954	Le Sage	Chamossaire
Dam Set Free (GB) 1964	Emancipation (GB); 1954	Le Sage	Miss Know All
Dam Set Free (GB) 1964	Emancipation (GB); 1954	Fair Freedom	Fair Trial
Dam Set Free (GB) 1964	Emancipation (GB); 1954	Fair Freedom	Democratie (Family: 6-b)
