= Hello Gorgeous =

American-bred Thoroughbred racehorse (1977– after 1999)

- Sire: Mr. Prospector
- Grandsire: Raise a Native
- Dam: Bonny Jet
- Damsire: Jet Jewel
- Sex: Stallion
- Foaled: 11 March 1977
- Country: United States
- Colour: Chestnut
- Breeder: Paul Denes
- Owner: Daniel Wildenstein
- Trainer: Henry Cecil
- Record: 9: 4-3-0

Major wins
- Royal Lodge Stakes (1979); William Hill Futurity (1979); Dante Stakes (1980)

Awards
- Timeform rating: 123 (1979), 128 (1980)

Hello Gorgeous (11 March 1977 – after 1999) was an American-bred, British-trained thoroughbred racehorse and sire. From the second crop of foals sired by Mr. Prospector, he was exported to Europe where he was one of the leading colts of his generation in 1979 and 1980. As a two-year-old he won three of his four races, including the Royal Lodge Stakes and the William Hill Futurity. In the following year he defeated a strong field to win the Dante Stakes, failed to stay in the Derby and finished second in the Eclipse Stakes. He was retired with a record of four wins and three second places from nine starts. He stood as a breeding stallion in Europe and South America but had very little success as a sire of winners.

== Background ==
Hello Gorgeous was a chestnut horse with a no white markings bred in Florida by Paul Denes. He from the second crop of foals sired by the outstanding American stallion Mr. Prospector and was among the first of his sire's progeny to make an impact in Europe. Hello Gorgeous's dam Bonny Jet was an unremarkable racehorse who won three minor races, and was a descendant of the British-bred broodmare California.

When offered for sale at Saratoga as a yearling, Hello Gorgeous failed to reach his reserve price but was bought privately by the French art dealer Daniel Wildenstein. The colt was sent to race in Europe where he entered training with Henry Cecil in Newmarket, Suffolk. He was usually ridden by the veteran English jockey Joe Mercer. Hello Gorgeous, who reportedly bore a striking resemblance to his grandsire Raise a Native was named after a quotation from the film Funny Girl.

== Racing career ==
=== 1979: two-year-old season ===
Hello Gorgeous began his racing career in the Ballymore Maiden Stakes over six furlongs at York Racecourse in June and won by one and a half lengths from Millingdale Lillie, a filly who went on to finish second in both the Cheveley Park Stakes and the Irish 1000 Guineas. After a break of three months, the colt returned to action in the Denis Bushby Stakes over seven furlongs at Great Yarmouth Racecourse in September, and finished second, beaten half a length by the Bruce Hobbs-trained filly Vielle. The winner later won the Nassau Stakes and finished runner-up in the Oaks Stakes and the Yorkshire Oaks. Later in September, Hello Gorgeous was moved up in class and distance to contest the Group Two Royal Lodge Stakes over one mile at Ascot Racecourse and started the 5/4 favourite. After the late withdrawal of two fancied runners his three opponents were Rontino (winner of the Acomb Stakes), Star Way and Prince Spruce. Despite the small field, the favourite found himself boxed in against the inside rail in the straight before Mercer extricated him by switching to the outside a furlong from the finish. Hello Gorgeous accelerated impressively to take the lead in the closing stages and won by a length from Star Way.

A month after his win at Ascot, Hello Gorgeous was moved up to Group One class for the William Hill Futurity at Doncaster Racecourse. The race was the main event in the first edition of World of Sport to be televised for ten weeks after a prolonged strike by ITV staff. As in the Royal Lodge, there were several late withdrawals including the Vincent O'Brien-trained Huguenot who had been strongly fancied for the race after winning the Beresford Stakes. Hello Gorgeous was made the 11/8 favourite in a seven-runner field with his main opposition expected to come from the French challengers Choucri (Prix Robert Papin) and In Fijar (Prix des Chênes). He turned into the straight in fourth place behind Choucri but struggled to obtain a clear run in the straight and Mercer had to switch to the right in the last quarter mile, hampering In Fijar in the process. Hello Gorgeous took the lead inside the final furlong and won by one and a half lengths from Choucri with the outsider Moomba Masquerade in third.

=== 1980: three-year-old season ===
Hello Gorgeous began his second season in the Greenham Stakes (a trial race for the 2000 Guineas) over seven furlongs at Newbury Racecourse on 19 April. In an exceptionally strong renewal of the race he finished fifth behind Final Straw, Monteverdi, Posse and Known Fact. Rather than contest the 2000 Guineas over one mile at Newmarket Racecourse the colt ran in the Heathorn Stakes over ten furlongs at the same meeting and was beaten a neck into second by the Luca Cumani-trained Royal Fountain. Two weeks after his defeat at Newmarket, Hello Gorgeous started at odds of 4/1 in a seven-runner field for the Dante Stakes (a major trial for the Derby Stakes) over ten and a half furlongs at York Racecourse. His opponents were Master Willie, Tyrnavos, Dukedom (White Rose Stakes), Water Mill, World Leader and Count Fernando. In a slowly-run race he appeared to be struggling half a mile from the finish but moved up to challenge for the lead approaching the final furlong. In the closing stages he got the better of a keen struggle with Master Willie to win by a neck.

At Epsom Downs Racecourse in June, Hello Gorgeous was one of twenty-four colts to contest the 201st running of the Derby. He was strongly fancied for the race despite fears that the soft ground would diminish his prospects of success. After tracking the leaders, he moved up on the outside approaching the last quarter mile but tired in the closing stages to finish sixth behind Henbit. After apparently failing to stay the one and a half miles at Epsom, Hello Gorgeous was brought back in distance for the Eclipse Stakes over one and a quarter miles at Sandown Park Racecourse, in which he was matched against older horses for the first time. After being restrained towards the rear of the field he produced a strong late run to finish second, beaten three-quarters of a length by the four-year-old Ela-Mana-Mou.

Despite rumours that the colt would be sent to race in North America, Hello Gorgeous never raced again and was retired at the end of the season, having been bought for approximately 4.5 million by the Coolmore Stud.

== Assessment ==
The official International Classification of two-year-olds for 1979 rated Hello Gorgeous their eighth-best colt, three pounds behind the top-rated Dragon. The independent Timeform organisation gave him a rating of 123, six pounds inferior to their best two-year-old Monteverdi. In their annual Racehorses of 1979 Timeform described him as "an attractive individual" who raced with "tremendous zest". In 1980 he was rated the tenth-best three-year-old colt in Europe, five pounds behind the sprinter Moorestyle. Timeform gave him a rating of 128, nine pounds inferior to Moorestyle, their Horse of the Year. In their annual Racehorses of 1980 Timeform called him a "thoroughly genuine" colt who could have achieved more if he had continued to be campaigned over his optimum distance.

== Stud record ==
Hello Gorgeous stood as a breeding stallion in Europe before being exported to Brazil in 1992. He sired no horses of any major consequence in either location. His last recorded foals were born in 2000.

== Pedigree ==
Pedigree of Hello Gorgeous (USA), chestnut stallion, 1977
Sire Mr. Prospector (USA) 1970	Raise a Native (USA); 1961	Native Dancer	Polynesian
Sire Mr. Prospector (USA) 1970	Raise a Native (USA); 1961	Native Dancer	Geisha
Sire Mr. Prospector (USA) 1970	Raise a Native (USA); 1961	Raise You	Case Ace
Sire Mr. Prospector (USA) 1970	Raise a Native (USA); 1961	Raise You	Lady Glory
Sire Mr. Prospector (USA) 1970	Gold Digger (USA); 1962	Nashua	Nasrullah
Sire Mr. Prospector (USA) 1970	Gold Digger (USA); 1962	Nashua	Segula
Sire Mr. Prospector (USA) 1970	Gold Digger (USA); 1962	Sequence	Count Fleet
Sire Mr. Prospector (USA) 1970	Gold Digger (USA); 1962	Sequence	Miss Dogwood
Dam Bonny Jet (USA) 1959	Jet Jewel (USA); 1949	Jet Pilot	Blenheim
Dam Bonny Jet (USA) 1959	Jet Jewel (USA); 1949	Jet Pilot	Black Wave
Dam Bonny Jet (USA) 1959	Jet Jewel (USA); 1949	Crepe Myrtle	Equipoise
Dam Bonny Jet (USA) 1959	Jet Jewel (USA); 1949	Crepe Myrtle	Myrtlewood
Dam Bonny Jet (USA) 1959	Bonny Bush (USA); 1953	Mr Busher	War Admiral
Dam Bonny Jet (USA) 1959	Bonny Bush (USA); 1953	Mr Busher	Baby League
Dam Bonny Jet (USA) 1959	Bonny Bush (USA); 1953	San Bonita	Sansovino
Dam Bonny Jet (USA) 1959	Bonny Bush (USA); 1953	San Bonita	California (Family: 13-e)
