= Julio Mariner =

British-bred Thoroughbred racehorse

- Sire: Blakeney
- Grandsire: Hethersett
- Dam: Set Free
- Damsire: Worden
- Sex: Stallion
- Foaled: 24 January 1975
- Country: United Kingdom
- Colour: Bay
- Breeder: Fonthill Stud
- Owner: Marcos Lemos
- Trainer: Clive Brittain
- Record: 12:3-3-0

Major wins
- St Leger Stakes (1978)

Awards
- Timeform rating 121 (1977), 127 (1978)

Julio Mariner (24 January 1975 – 26 May 2004) was a British Thoroughbred racehorse and sire best known for winning the classic St Leger Stakes in 1978. In a racing career which lasted from August 1977 until October 1978 he won three of his twelve starts. As a two-year-old he won only one of his five races but established himself as a top-class performer when he finished a close and unlucky second in the William Hill Futurity. After running well on his three-year-old debut he produced a series of disappointing efforts before recording an upset victory over a strong field in the St Leger. After his retirement from racing he became a successful sire of sport horses and died in the Netherlands in 2004.

== Background ==
Julio Mariner was an exceptionally good-looking bay horse with no white markings bred in Wiltshire by the Fonthill Stud which was managed by James Ian Morrison. He was sired by Blakeney the winner of the 1969 Epsom Derby, who was standing at the National Stud. Julio Mariner's dam Set Free was a moderate racehorse, with a best Timeform rating of 90, but she became an outstanding broodmare. She had already produced the Oaks Stakes winner Juliette Marny (also by Blakeney) and went on to produce Scintillate a filly who won the Oaks in 1979.

In 1976, Julio Mariner was sent to the Newmarket October Yearling Sales and was bought for 40,000 guineas by the Greek shipping magnate Marcos Lemos. He was sent into training with Clive Brittain at his Carlburg stable in Newmarket.

== Racing career ==
=== 1977: two-year-old season ===
Julio Mariner made his debut in the Acomb Stakes at York Racecourse in August when he lost a great deal of ground at the start and finished unplaced. In the Sancton Stakes over seven furlongs at the same venue later that month he was beaten a short head by Tannenberg, with the two finishing twelve lengths clear of the other runners. In the following month he was moved up in class and distance for the Group Two Royal Lodge Stakes over one mile at Ascot Racecourse. He finished fourth behind Shirley Heights, Bolak and Hawaiian Sound with the independent Timeform organisation suggesting that he may have been unsuited by the firm ground.

He returned to York in early October and recorded his first success in the Leyburn Stakes, drawing well clear of his opponents in the closing stages. On his final appearance of the season, Julio Mariner contested the William Hill Futurity, the most valuable race for two-year-olds ever run in Britain. In a rough race, Julio Mariner was repeatedly blocked before being switched to the wide outside by his rider Eddie Hide to obtain a clear run in the last quarter mile. The colt made up a great deal of ground but failed by a head to catch Dactylographer. Timeform commented that "he would have won by a length or two with a clear run".

=== 1978: three-year-old season ===
Julio Mariner began his second season at York in May when he contested the Dante Stakes, a major trial race for The Derby. He took the lead three furlongs from the finish before finishing second, beaten 1 1/2 lengths by Shirley Heights. In the Derby, he looked likely to take a hand in the finish but weakened in the closing stages to finish sixth, more than eight lengths behind Shirley Heights. In the King Edward VII Stakes at Royal Ascot he finished unplaced behind Classic Example and then won a minor race over one mile at York. In the Benson and Hedges Gold Cup at York in August he was equipped with blinkers but made little impact, finishing eighth of the ten runners behind Hawaiian Sound. By this time, Julio Mariner's career was regarded as a major disappointment, with both his stamina and courage being questioned.

In September, Julio Mariner started a 28/1 outsider for the 202nd running of the St Leger Stakes over 14 1/2 furlongs at Doncaster Racecourse. The favourite for the race was the King George VI and Queen Elizabeth Stakes winner Ile de Bourbon, while the other major contenders included Le Moss and the Grand Prix de Paris winner Galiani. In a change of tactics, Hide retrained the colt at the back of the fourteen runner field before beginning to move forward approaching the final turn. Julio Mariner continued to make steady progress, overtaking the leader Obraztsovy approaching the final furlong and winning by 1 1/2 lengths from the fast-finishing Le Moss, with M-Lolshan beating Obraztsovy for third place. On his final appearance, Julio Mariner was brought back in distance for the Prix de l'Arc de Triomphe over 2400 metres at Longchamp Racecourse in October. He was never able to mount a serious challenge but made some progress in the closing stages to finish eleventh of the eighteen runners behind Alleged.

== Assessment ==
In 1978, Julio Mariner was given a rating of 121 by Timeform, nine pounds behind the top-rated two-year-old Try My Best. In the official International Classification he was less highly regarded, being rated thirteen pounds inferior to Try My Best. In the following year he was rated on 127 by Timeform, eleven pounds below their top-rated horse of the year Alleged. In the official International Classification he was rated thirteen pounds behind Alleged and eight pounds below the leading three-year-old Ile de Bourbon.

In their book, A Century of Champions, based on the Timeform rating system, John Randall and Tony Morris rated Julio Mariner an "inferior" winner of the St Leger.

== Stud record ==
Julio Mariner was retired from racing Entered in 1979-84 Ashley House Stud in Newmarket At stud in 1985-87 at Cobhall Court Stud with a syndication value of £800,000. He had limited success as sire of racehorses but after being exported to the Netherlands in 1988 he was more successful as a sire of show jumpers, dressage horses and eventers. Julio Mariner died at De Watermolen in Haaksbergen on 26 May 2004 at the age of twenty-nine.

== Pedigree ==
Pedigree of Julio Mariner (GB), bay stallion, 1975
Sire Blakeney (GB) 1966	Hethersett (GB); 1959	Hugh Lupus	Djebel
Sire Blakeney (GB) 1966	Hethersett (GB); 1959	Hugh Lupus	Sakountala
Sire Blakeney (GB) 1966	Hethersett (GB); 1959	Bride Elect	Big Game
Sire Blakeney (GB) 1966	Hethersett (GB); 1959	Bride Elect	Netherton Maid
Sire Blakeney (GB) 1966	Windmill Girl (GB); 1961	Hornbeam	Hyperion
Sire Blakeney (GB) 1966	Windmill Girl (GB); 1961	Hornbeam	Thicket
Sire Blakeney (GB) 1966	Windmill Girl (GB); 1961	Chorus Beauty	Chanteur
Sire Blakeney (GB) 1966	Windmill Girl (GB); 1961	Chorus Beauty	Neberna
Dam Set Free (GB) 1964	Worden (FR); 1949	Wild Risk	Rialto
Dam Set Free (GB) 1964	Worden (FR); 1949	Wild Risk	Wild Violet
Dam Set Free (GB) 1964	Worden (FR); 1949	Sans Tares	Sind
Dam Set Free (GB) 1964	Worden (FR); 1949	Sans Tares	Tara
Dam Set Free (GB) 1964	Emancipation (GB); 1954	Le Sage	Chamossaire
Dam Set Free (GB) 1964	Emancipation (GB); 1954	Le Sage	Miss Know All
Dam Set Free (GB) 1964	Emancipation (GB); 1954	Fair Freedom	Fair Trial
Dam Set Free (GB) 1964	Emancipation (GB); 1954	Fair Freedom	Democratie (Family: 6-b)
