= Mountain lodge =

Mountain lodge may refer to:

- Mountain hut, a building in the mountains providing food and shelter for mountaineers
- Mountain Lodge, the former governor's house in Hong Kong
- Mountain Lodge (horse), the former British racehorse
