= Tyrnavos (horse) =

British-bred Thoroughbred racehorse

- Sire: Blakeney
- Grandsire: Hethersett
- Dam: Stilvi
- Damsire: Derring-Do
- Sex: Stallion
- Foaled: 17 February 1977
- Country: United Kingdom
- Colour: Bay
- Breeder: George Cambanis
- Owner: George Cambanis
- Trainer: Bruce Hobbs
- Record: 9: 3-1-1

Major wins
- Craven Stakes (1980); Irish Derby (1980)

Awards
- Timeform rating 124 (1979), 129 (1980)

Tyrnavos (17 February 1977 – 30 August 2003) was a British Thoroughbred racehorse and sire, best known for his win in the 1980 Irish Derby. As a two-year-old he showed promise by winning one of his three races and finishing second in the Dewhurst Stakes. In the following year he won the Craven Stakes, but was well-beaten in the 2000 Guineas, Dante Stakes and Epsom Derby, before recording a 25/1 upset victory the Irish Derby at the Curragh Racecourse. He was retired to stud at the end of the year and had limited success as a sire of winners.

== Background ==
Tyrnavos was a "very impressive looking" dark-coated bay horse with no white markings, bred in England by his owner George Cambanis. His dam Stilvi was bought by Cambanis as a yearling and became a top-class racehorse, winning the King George Stakes and Duke of York Stakes and an outstanding broodmare. Before Tyranvos, she had produced Tachypous (Middle Park Stakes) and Tromos (Dewhurst Stakes) and she went on to produce the Coronation Stakes winner Tolmi. He was from the sixth crop of foals sired by Blakeney the winner of the 1969 Epsom Derby, who stood as a breeding stallion at the National Stud. Cambanis named his colt after a town in Thessaly and sent him into training with Bruce Hobbs at the Palace House stable in Newmarket, Suffolk.

== Racing career ==
=== 1979: two-year-old season ===
Tyrnavos made his racecourse debut in the Ribero Stakes over six furlongs at Doncaster Racecourse in September. According to Timeform he appeared to have "little idea of what was required" but showed promise in finishing a close third behind Thousandfold and Dalsaan. Later in the month, the colt was moved up in distance for the Roverre Trophy Stakes over seven furlongs at Ascot. He won by a length from Eyelight but was not particularly impressive. In October, Tyrnavos was moved up in class to contest the Group One Dewhurst Stakes, the most important race for two-year-olds run in the United Kingdom, in which he faced a strong field including Monteverdi, Henbit, Romeo Romani (Norfolk Stakes), Marathon Gold (Lanson Champagne Stakes) and Final Straw (Champagne Stakes). He disputed the early lead with Henbit and after looking to be struggling three furlongs from the finish he stayed on strongly to take second place, two lengths behind Monteverdi.

=== 1980: three-year-old season ===
Tyrnavos began his second season in April at Newmarket where he contested the Craven Stakes, a trial race for the 2000 Guineas. Ridden by Eddie Hide, he started at odds of 5/1 and won by a neck from Star Way with World Leader in third place. In the 2000 Guineas over the same course and distance on 3 May he raced prominently for most of the race but was unable to quicken in the last quarter mile and finished seventh, eight lengths behind the subsequently disqualified Nureyev. At York Racecourse later that month, Tyrnavos was moved up in distance to ten and a half furlongs for the Dante Stakes, a trial for The Derby. He finished strongly, but was beaten into fourth place behind Hello Gorgeous, Master Willie and Water Mill.

On 4 June, Tyrnavos was one of twenty-four colts to contest the 201st running of the Derby over one and a half miles on firm ground at Epsom Downs Racecourse. He was well-fancied for the race despite some concerns that, as the son of a sprinter (Stilvi), he might struggle to stay the distance. The early stages were very rough and Tyrnavos was blocked and bumped several times before being forced to the wide outside on the final turn. He made little progress in the straight and eventually finished twelfth behind Henbit. On 28 June, Tyrnavos, racing on soft ground for the first time, started a 25/1 outsider for the Irish Derby at the Curragh. The field included Master Willie, Rankin, Pelerin and Garrido who had finished second, third, fourth and fifth in the Epsom Derby as well as Nikoli, the beaten favourite. Ridden by Tony Murray Tyrnavos took the lead shortly after the start and set a steady pace. Apparently relishing the ground conditions, he was never headed, staying on strongly in the straight to win by one and a half lengths from the Dick Hern-trained Prince Bee, with Ramian two and a half length away in third. His win gave Bruce Hobbs the first and only classic winner of his training career. The winning time was an unusually slow 2:43.8. The ground was firmer when Tyrnavos contested Britain's most prestigious all-aged race, the King George VI and Queen Elizabeth Stakes at Ascot a month later. Ridden by Hide he led until the approach to the final turn, when he was overtaken by Ela-Mana-Mou. He appeared to be still in contention for second place when he was bumped by More Light and dropped away quickly to finish eighth of the ten runners. Shortly after his run at Ascot, Tyrnavos was syndicated at £20,000 a share, giving him a theoretical value of £800,000.

== Assessment ==
In 1979, Timeform gave Tyrnavos a rating of 124, five pounds below their top-rated juvenile Monteverdi. In the official International Classification he was again rated five pounds below Monteverdi, who shared top-rating with the French colt Dragon. In the following year he was rated 129, by Timeform, eight pounds below their best horse of the year Moorestyle. In the International Classification he was rated the tenth-best three-year-old colt in Europe.

== Stud record ==
Tyrnavos was retired from racing to become a breeding stallion at the Gazeley Stud in Newmarket and was later exported to Japan.

The best of his offspring was Dihistan, who won the Hardwicke Stakes and the September Stakes in 1986. He died on 30 August 2003 in Japan.

== Pedigree ==
Pedigree of Tyrnavos (GB), bay stallion, 1977
Sire Blakeney (GB) 1966	Hethersett (GB); 1959	Hugh Lupus	Djebel*
Sire Blakeney (GB) 1966	Hethersett (GB); 1959	Hugh Lupus	Sakountala
Sire Blakeney (GB) 1966	Hethersett (GB); 1959	Bride Elect	Big Game
Sire Blakeney (GB) 1966	Hethersett (GB); 1959	Bride Elect	Netherton Maid
Sire Blakeney (GB) 1966	Windmill Girl (GB); 1961	Hornbeam	Hyperion
Sire Blakeney (GB) 1966	Windmill Girl (GB); 1961	Hornbeam	Thicket
Sire Blakeney (GB) 1966	Windmill Girl (GB); 1961	Chorus Beauty	Chanteur
Sire Blakeney (GB) 1966	Windmill Girl (GB); 1961	Chorus Beauty	Neberna
Dam Stilvi (IRE) 1969	Derring-Do (GB); 1961	Darius	Dante
Dam Stilvi (IRE) 1969	Derring-Do (GB); 1961	Darius	Yasna
Dam Stilvi (IRE) 1969	Derring-Do (GB); 1961	Sipsey Bridge	Abernant
Dam Stilvi (IRE) 1969	Derring-Do (GB); 1961	Sipsey Bridge	Claudette
Dam Stilvi (IRE) 1969	Djerella (FR); 1960	Guersant	Bubbles
Dam Stilvi (IRE) 1969	Djerella (FR); 1960	Guersant	Montagnana
Dam Stilvi (IRE) 1969	Djerella (FR); 1960	Djeretta	Djebel*
Dam Stilvi (IRE) 1969	Djerella (FR); 1960	Djeretta	Candida (Family 3-h)

* Tyrnavos is inbred 4S x 4D to the stallion Djebel, meaning that he appears fourth generation on the sire side of his pedigree and fourth generation on the dam side of his pedigree.
