= Arthur Budgett =

British racehorse trainer

Personal information
- Born: 26 May 1916
- Died: 21 June 2011 (aged 95)
- Occupations: Trainer, Owner, Breeder

Horse racing career
- Sport: Horse racing

Major racing wins
- British Classic Race wins as trainer: Epsom Derby (2)

Racing awards
- British flat racing Champion Trainer (1969)

Significant horses
- Windmill Girl, Blakeney, Morston

Arthur Budgett (26 May 1916 – 21 June 2011) was a British Thoroughbred racehorse trainer who was one of only two people to have bred, owned and trained two English Derby winners.

Based at Whatcombe Estate in Berkshire, Budgett was British flat racing champion trainer in 1969.

Budgett purchased the mare Windmill Girl in 1962. Two of her foals were named after neighbouring villages in Norfolk, Blakeney and Morston, as was Blakeney's sire Hethersett. Blakeney went on to win the 1969 Derby and Morston followed up by winning the 1973 Derby.

Budgett retired in 1975.

== Book citations ==
- Curling, Bill (1977). DERBY DOUBLE. The Unique story of Racehorse Trainer Arthur Budgett. London: William Luscombe Publisher Limited. ISBN 0-86002-164-5.
