= Easter Stakes =

Discontinued flat horse race in Britain

- Class: Conditions
- Location: Kempton Park, Sunbury, England
- Race type: Flat / Thoroughbred
- Website: Kempton Park

Race information
- Distance: 1 mile (1,609 metres)
- Surface: Polytrack
- Track: Right-handed
- Qualification: Three-year-old colts and geldings excluding Group winners
- Weight: 8 st 12 lb Penalties; 8 lb for each Class 1 win * 6 lb for each Class 2 win * 4 lb for each Class 3 win * * since May 31 last year excluding handicap races (cumulative to max. of 10lb)
- Purse: £40,000 (2009); 1st: £22,708

Easter Stakes
2009
Pure Poetry	Shampagne	Mishrif

Previous years
2008
Il Warrd	Gaspar Van Wittel	Latin Lad
2007
Dubai's Touch	Prime Defender	Danebury Hill
2006
Asset	Royal Power	Dubai Typhoon
2005
Rebel Rebel	Capable Guest	Xtra Torrential
2004
Privy Seal	Mutahayya	Psychiatrist
2003
Prince Tum Tum	Dutch Gold	Dust Cover

The Easter Stakes was a Listed flat horse race in Great Britain open to three-year-old colts and geldings. It was run over a distance of 1 mile (1,609 metres) at Kempton Park on Easter Saturday.

It was run for the last time in April 2009.

== History ==
The Easter Stakes was originally run on turf and served as a trial for various colts' Classics in Europe.

The race was transferred to Kempton's newly opened Polytrack circuit in 2006. It was demoted from Listed status after the 2009 running, when the three-year average of its winners' ratings failed to reach the required level, and the name was dropped.

The ungraded version of the Conditions race which replaced it was initially backed by 32Red. The bookmaking company Betfred became its sponsor in 2012.

== Records ==
Leading jockey (3 wins):

- Pat Eddery – Zelphi (1988), Two O'Clock Jump (1995), Prince Tum Tum (2003)
- John Reid – Lunar Mover (1989), Lucky Lindy (1992), Right Win (1993)

Leading trainer (7 wins):

- Richard Hannon Sr. – Lucky Lindy (1992), Right Win (1993), Two O'Clock Jump (1995), Regiment (1996), Pelham (1997), Asset (2006), Pure Poetry (2009)

== Winners ==
Year	Winner	Jockey	Trainer	Time
	Turf before 2006
1979	Man of Vision	Bruce Raymond	Michael Jarvis	1:45.07
1980	Master Willie	Philip Waldron	Henry Candy	1:47.21
1981	Noalto	Greville Starkey	Frankie Durr	1:38.33
1982	Rare Gift	Lester Piggott	John Sutcliffe Jr.	1:46.33
1983	Sackford	Greville Starkey	Guy Harwood	1:53.67
1984	Keen	Lester Piggott	Henry Cecil	1:36.54
1985	Severn Bore	Geoff Baxter	Frankie Durr	1:47.15
1986	Tisn't	Philip Waldron	Paul Cole	1:50.27
1987	Shady Heights	Steve Cauthen	Robert Armstrong	1:43.42
1988	Zelphi	Pat Eddery	Jeremy Tree	1:46.86
1989	Lunar Mover	John Reid	Charlie Nelson	1:47.80
1990	Elmaamul	Willie Carson	Dick Hern	1:38.72
1991	Corrupt	Tony Cruz	Neville Callaghan	1:41.63
1992	Lucky Lindy	John Reid	Richard Hannon Sr.	1:44.66
1993	Right Win	John Reid	Richard Hannon Sr.	1:47.38
1994	Ultimo Imperatore	Willie Carson	John Dunlop	1:48.48
1995	Two O'Clock Jump	Pat Eddery	Richard Hannon Sr.	1:37.69
1996	Regiment	Richard Quinn	Richard Hannon Sr.	1:42.95
1997	Pelham	Dane O'Neill	Richard Hannon Sr.	1:39.30
1998	Krispy Knight	Richard Hills	John Hills	1:54.99
1999	Dehoush	Michael Roberts	Alec Stewart	1:39.46
2000	Kingsclere	Kieren Fallon	Ian Balding	1:47.35
2001	Herodotus	Philip Robinson	Clive Brittain	1:50.46
2002	Flat Spin	Kieren Fallon	John Dunlop	1:40.47
2003	Prince Tum Tum	Pat Eddery	John Dunlop	1:37.23
2004	Privy Seal	Frankie Dettori	John Gosden	1:42.80
2005	Rebel Rebel	Oscar Urbina	Neville Callaghan	1:42.60
	Polytrack after 2005
2006	Asset	Richard Hughes	Richard Hannon Sr.	1:40.87
2007	Dubai's Touch	Jean-Pierre Guillambert	Mark Johnston	1:39.41
2008	Il Warrd	Martin Dwyer	Marcus Tregoning	1:38.56
2009	Pure Poetry ^{[a]}	Richard Hughes	Richard Hannon Sr.	1:38.49

^{a} The 2009 winner Pure Poetry was later exported to Hong Kong and renamed Cheerful Delights.

== See also ==
- Horseracing in Great Britain
- List of British flat horse races
