= Jockey Club Stakes =

Flat horse race in Britain

- Class: Group 2
- Location: Rowley Mile; Newmarket, England
- Inaugurated: 1894
- Race type: Flat / Thoroughbred
- Sponsor: Betfred
- Website: Newmarket

Race information
- Distance: 1m 4f (2,414 metres)
- Surface: Turf
- Track: Right-hand "L"
- Qualification: Four-years-old and up
- Weight: 9 st 5 lb Allowances; 3 lb for fillies and mares Penalties; 3 lb for Group 1 winners * * after 2023
- Purse: £125,000 (2025); 1st: £70,888

Jockey Club Stakes
2026
Santorini Star	Eydon	French Master

Previous years
2025
Bellum Justum	Silver Knott	Divina Grace
2024
Outbox	Time Lock	Naqeeb
2023
Hurricane Lane	Global Storm	West Wind Blows
2022
Living Legend	Yibir	Outbox
2021
Sir Ron Priestley	Pyledriver	Thunderous

2020-2011
2019
Communique	Defoe	Mildenberger
2018
Defoe	Red Verdon	Count Octave
2017
Seventh Heaven	One Foot In Heaven	Pinzolo
2016
Exosphere	Simple Verse	Big Orange
2015
Second Step	Telescope	Pether's Moon
2014
Gospel Choir	Pether's Moon	Trading Leather
2013
Universal	Dandino	Wigmore Hall
2012
Al Kazeem	Quest For Peace	Dunaden
2011
Dandino	Native Ruler	Indian Days

2010-2001
2010
Jukebox Jury	Nanton	Claremont
2009
Bronze Cannon	Casual Conquest	Drill Sergeant
2008
Getaway	Sixties Icon	Galactic Star
2007
Sixties Icon	Admiral's Cruise	Mighty
2006
Shirocco	Munsef	Bandari
2005
Alkaased	Gamut	Bandari
2004
Gamut	Systematic	Warrsan
2003
Warrsan	Millenary	Highest
2002
Marienbard	Millenary	Storming Home
2001
Millenary	Sandmason	Holding Court

2000-1991
2000
Blueprint	Casamasa	Largesse
1999
Silver Patriarch	Silver Rhapsody	Ta-Lim
1998
Romanov	Silver Patriarch	The Fly
1997
Time Allowed	Busy Flight	Mons
1996
Riyadian	Burooj	Sacrament
1995
Only Royale	Tikkanen	Time Star
1994
Silver Wisp	Apple Tree	Bobzao
1993
Zinaad	Apple Tree	Jeune
1992
Sapience	Luchiroverte	Toulon
1991
Rock Hopper	Mountain Kingdom	Karinga Bay

1990-1989
1990
Roseate Tern	Ile De Nisky	Artic Envoy
1989
Unfuwain	Glacial Storm	Tralos

The Jockey Club Stakes is a Group 2 flat horse race in Great Britain open to horses aged four years or older. It is run over a distance of 1 mile and 4 furlongs (2,414 metres) on the Rowley Mile at Newmarket in late April or early May.

== History ==
The event was introduced by the Jockey Club in 1894. It was originally held in the autumn, and was initially run over 1 mile and 2 furlongs.

In the early part of its history, the Jockey Club Stakes was open to horses aged three or older. It sometimes featured one or more of the season's Classic winners. It was extended to 1 mile and 6 furlongs in 1901.

The race continued to be staged in the autumn until 1962. It was switched to the spring and cut to 1 mile and 4 furlongs in 1963. It was subsequently closed to three-year-olds.

The Jockey Club Stakes is currently held on the opening day of Newmarket's three-day Guineas Festival meeting.

The leading contenders from the Jockey Club Stakes often go on to compete in the Coronation Cup. The last to win both races in the same year was Shirocco in 2006.

== Records ==
Most successful horse (2 wins):

- Phardante – 1986, 1987

Leading jockey (7 wins):

- Lester Piggott – Holmbush (1950), Nucleus (1955), Court Prince (1959), St. Paddy (1961), Knockroe (1972), Relay Race (1974), Ardross (1982)

Leading trainer (9 wins):

- Alec Taylor, Jr. – Love Wisely (1897), Sceptre (1903), Sancy (1907), Lemberg (1910), Trois Temps (1914), Prince Chimay (1918), Lady Juror (1922), Inkerman (1923), Book Law (1927)

== Winners ==
Year	Winner	Age	Jockey	Trainer	Owner	Time
1894	Isinglass	4	Tommy Loates	James Jewitt	Harry McCalmont
1895	Laveno
1896	Persimmon	3		Richard Marsh	Prince of Wales	2:14.60
1897	Love Wisely			Alec Taylor Jr.
1898	Cyllene	3	Sam Loates	William Jarvis	Charles Day Rose	2:12.80
1899	Flying Fox	3	Mornington Cannon	John Porter	Hugh Grosvenor, 1st Duke of Westminster	2:11.80
1900	Disguise II	3	Mornington Cannon			2:08.80
1901	Pietermaritzburg	3	Mornington Cannon			3:09.00
1902	Rising Glass	3	William Halsey	William Halsey		3:08.80
1903	Sceptre	4		Alec Taylor Jr.	Sir William Bass
1904	Rock Sand	4	Danny Maher	George Blackwell	Sir James Miller	3:00.40
1905	St Amant	4	Kempton Cannon	T Cannon Jr	Leopold de Rothschild
1906	Beppo	3	Billy Higgs	Fred Pratt
1907	Sancy	4	Otto Madden	Alec Taylor Jr.
1908	Siberia	3	Bernard Dillon	Peter Gilpin		3:00.40
1909	Phaleron	3	Bernard Dillon	Willie Waugh
1910	Lemberg	3	Danny Maher	Alec Taylor Jr.	Alfred W. Cox
1911	Stedfast	3	Frank Wooton	George Lambton		2:56.80
1912	Prince Palatine	4	Frank O'Neill	Henry Beardsley	Thomas Pilkington	3:05.00
1913	Cantilever	3	Walter Griggs	Colledge Leader		3:05.00
1914	Trois Temps	3	James Clark	Alec Taylor Jr.		3:00.60
1915	Lanius	4	Walter Griggs	Peter Gilpin		2:59.20
1916	Cannobie	3	Morny Wing	Willie Waugh		2:59.20
	no race 1917
1918	Prince Chimay	3	Otto Madden	Alec Taylor Jr.
1919	Abandoned due to a National Rail strike (Note: The 1919 running was abandoned due to the 1919 United Kingdom railway strike)
1920	Torelore	3	Bernard Carslake	Atty Persse
1921	Milenko	3	William Lister	Fred Pratt		3:04.40
1922	Lady Juror	3	Freddy Lane	Alec Taylor Jr.		3:02.80
1923	Inkerman	3	Joe Childs	Alec Taylor Jr.		3:02.60
1924	Teresina	4	Charlie Elliott	Richard Dawson		2:59.80
1925	Tatra	3	Freddie Fox	Captain Richard Gooch		3:00.20
1926	Foxlaw	4	Brownie Carslake	Reg Day		3:04.40
1927	Book Law	3	Henri Jelliss	Alec Taylor Jr.	Lord Astor	3:06.00
1928	Toboggan	3	Tommy Weston	Frank Butters	Lord Derby	3:04.80
1929	Cyclonic	4	Charlie Elliott	Basil Jarvis		3:00.80
1930	Pyramid	3	Tommy Weston	Frank Butters		3:10.60
1931	Shell Transport	3	Bobby Dick	Joseph Lawson		3:02.00
1932	Firdaussi	3	Michael Beary	Frank Butters	Aga Khan III	3:16.00
1933	Tai-Yang	3	Gordon Richards	Fred Darling	H Morriss	3:04.60
1934	Umidwar	3	Freddie Fox	Frank Butters	Aga Khan III	2:59.60
1935	Plassy	3	Richard Perryman	Colledge Leader	Lord Derby	3:04.40
1936	Precipitation	3	Richard Perryman	Cecil Boyd-Rochfort	Lady Zia Wernher	3:02.40
1937	Solfo	3	Tommy Lowrey	Basil Jarvis	Major J S Courtauld	3:08.00
1938	Challenge	3	Eph Smith	Jack Jarvis	Sir L Philipps	3:14.00
	no race 1939–44
1945	Black Peter	3	Sam Wragg	Jack Waugh	Mrs M Harvey	3:00.40
1946	Rising Light	4	Doug Smith	Cecil Boyd-Rochfort	King George VI	3:00.00
1947	Esprit De France	3	Doug Smith		Aga Khan III	3:07.20
1948	Alycidon	3	Doug Smith	Walter Earl	Lord Derby	2:59.30
1949	Dust Devil	3	Doug Smith	Frank Butters	Aga Khan III	3:03.40
1950	Holmbush	3	Lester Piggott	Arthur Budgett	Sir Derrick Bailey	3:08.94
1951	Pardal	4	Rae Johnstone		Marcel Boussac	3:09.79
1952	Mister Cube	3	Manny Mercer	Jack Jarvis	Sir A Jarvis	3:13.73
1953	Buckhound	4	Sir Gordon Richards	Noel Murless	Colonel B Hornung	2:56.19
1954	Brilliant Green	3	Eph Smith	D F Watson	James A de Rothschild	3:06.72
1955	Nucleus	3	Lester Piggott	Charles Jerdein	Dorothy Paget	3:02.67
1956	Kurun	4	Charlie Smirke	Charlie Elliott	Marcel Boussac	3:02.65
1957	Court Harwell	3	Scobie Breasley	Sir Gordon Richards	J R Mullion	3:06.11
1958	All Serene	3	Doug Smith	Norman Bertie	H R H Princess Royal	3:14.81
1959	Court Prince	3	Lester Piggott	Noel Murless	T Lilley	3:09.79
1960	Prolific	3	Duncan Keith	Walter Nightingall	Mrs C Evans	3:05.82
1961	St. Paddy	4	Lester Piggott	Noel Murless	Lady Sassoon	3:03.81
1962	Gaul	3	Geoff Lewis	Peter Hastings-Bass	Lord Sefton	3:01.71
1963	Darling Boy	5	Joe Mercer	Dick Hern	J. J. Astor	2:36.21
1964	Fighting Ship	4	Peter Robinson	Jack Jarvis	Lord Rosebery	2:40.26
1965	Bal Masque	5	Bill Pyers	Ernie Fellows	Mrs Howell E Jackson	2:45.33
1966	Alacalde	4	Doug Smith	Bernard van Cutsem	Lord Derby	2:36.44
1967	Acrania	4	Jimmy Lindley	Guy Harwood	R Zelker	2:36.33
1968	Crozier	5	Duncan Keith	Peter Walwyn	David Oldrey	2:40.62
1969	Torpid	4	Greville Starkey	John Oxley	Dick Hollingsworth	2:43.94
1970	Queen Of Twilight	4	Brian Taylor	Harvey Leader	Mrs L Smith	2:38.48
1971	Meadowville	4	Frankie Durr	Michael Jarvis	David Robinson	2:39.80
1972	Knockroe	4	Lester Piggott	Peter Nelson	Major V McCalmont	2:33.82
1973	Our Mirage	4	Frankie Durr	Barry Hills	Mrs S Enfield	2:36.23
1974	Relay Race	4	Lester Piggott	Henry Cecil	Sir R Macdonald-Buchanan	2:40.13
1975	Shebeen	4	Geoff Baxter	Bruce Hobbs	Sir Kenneth Butt	2:39.12
1976	Orange Bay	4	Pat Eddery	Peter Walwyn	Carlo Vittadini	2:38.48
1977	Oats	4	Pat Eddery	Peter Walwyn	David Oldrey	2:35.95
1978	Classic Example	4	Pat Eddery	Peter Walwyn	F Hue-Williams	2:48.85
1979	Obraztsovy	4	Brian Taylor	Ryan Price	H Demetriou	2:44.67
1980	More Light	4	Willie Carson	Dick Hern	R Budgett	2:39.60
1981	Master Willie	4	Philip Waldron	Henry Candy	Robert Barnett	2:38.18
1982	Ardross	6	Lester Piggott	Henry Cecil	Charles St George	2:33.14
1983	Electric	4	Walter Swinburn	Michael Stoute	R Clifford-Turner	2:39.14
1984	Gay Lemur	4	Geoff Baxter	Bruce Hobbs	Lady Eva Rosebery	2:36.15
1985	Kirmann	4	Steve Cauthen	Fulke Johnson Houghton	Aga Khan IV	2:31.57
1986	Phardante	4	Greville Starkey	Guy Harwood	Simon Karmel	2:36.45
1987	Phardante	5	Greville Starkey	Guy Harwood	Simon Karmel	2:34.27
1988	Almaarad	5	Willie Carson	John Dunlop	Hamdan Al Maktoum	2:39.57
1989	Unfuwain	4	Willie Carson	Dick Hern	Hamdan Al Maktoum	2:31.09
1990	Roseate Tern	4	Frankie Dettori	Luca Cumani	Peter Brant	2:30.10
1991	Rock Hopper	4	Pat Eddery	Michael Stoute	Maktoum Al Maktoum	2:34.48
1992	Sapience	6	Ray Cochrane	David Elsworth	W H O'Gorman	2:32.13
1993	Zinaad	4	Walter Swinburn	Michael Stoute	Maktoum Al Maktoum	2:31.40
1994	Silver Wisp	5	Michael Hills	David Nicholson	Shirley Robins	2:31.37
1995	Only Royale	6	Frankie Dettori	Luca Cumani	Frank Stronach	2:31.26
1996	Riyadian	4	Richard Quinn	Paul Cole	Prince Fahd Salman	2:32.20
1997	Time Allowed	4	John Reid	Michael Stoute	Robert Barnett	2:29.15
1998	Romanov	4	John Reid	Peter Chapple-Hyam	Robert Sangster	2:39.10
1999 (Note: The 1999 running took place on Newmarket's July Course)	Silver Patriarch	5	Pat Eddery	John Dunlop	Peter Winfield	2:28.48
2000	Blueprint	5	Kieren Fallon	Sir Michael Stoute	Queen Elizabeth II	2:31.72
2001	Millenary	4	Pat Eddery	John Dunlop	L Neil Jones	2:32.67
2002	Marienbard	5	Jamie Spencer	Saeed bin Suroor	Godolphin	2:30.09
2003	Warrsan	5	Philip Robinson	Clive Brittain	Saeed Manana	2:35.48
2004	Gamut	5	Kieren Fallon	Sir Michael Stoute	Gay Smith	2:29.77
2005	Alkaased	5	Jimmy Fortune	Luca Cumani	Michael Charlton	2:31.43
2006	Shirocco	5	Christophe Soumillon	André Fabre	Baron Georg van Ullmann	2:36.25
2007	Sixties Icon	4	Frankie Dettori	Jeremy Noseda	Susan Roy	2:33.52
2008	Getaway	5	Stéphane Pasquier	André Fabre	Baron Georg van Ullmann	2:35.63
2009	Bronze Cannon	4	Jimmy Fortune	John Gosden	Anthony Oppenheimer	2:30.70
2010	Jukebox Jury	4	Royston Ffrench	Mark Johnston	Alan Spence	2:32.34
2011	Dandino	4	Paul Mulrennan	James Given	Elite Racing Club	2:33.70
2012	Al Kazeem	4	James Doyle	Roger Charlton	John Deer	2:39.66
2013	Universal	4	Joe Fanning	Mark Johnston	Abdulla Al Mansoori	2:32.83
2014	Gospel Choir	5	Ryan Moore	Sir Michael Stoute	Cheveley Park Stud	2:33.03
2015	Second Step	4	Andrea Atzeni	Luca Cumani	Merry Fox Stud Ltd	2:32.37
2016	Exosphere	4	Ryan Moore	Sir Michael Stoute	Khalid Abdullah	2:30.92
2017	Seventh Heaven	4	Ryan Moore	Aidan O'Brien	Smith / Magnier / Tabor	2:34.39
2018	Defoe	4	Andrea Atzeni	Roger Varian	Mohammed Obaid Al Maktoum	2:34.01
2019	Communique	4	Silvestre de Sousa	Mark Johnston	Hamdan bin Mohammed Al Maktoum	2:33.49
	no race 2020 (Note: The 2020 running was cancelled because of the COVID-19 pandemic in the United Kingdom)
2021	Sir Ron Priestley	5	Franny Norton	Mark Johnston	Paul Dean	2:32.54
2022	Living Legend	6	Joe Fanning	Charlie and Mark Johnston	Barbara & Alick Richmond	2:38.15
2023	Hurricane Lane	5	William Buick	Charlie Appleby	Godolphin	2:33.86
2024	Outbox	9	Hollie Doyle	Archie Watson	Hambleton Racing Ltd XXXIII	2:33.49
2025	Bellum Justum	4	Oisin Murphy	Andrew Balding	King Power Racing Co Ltd	2:32.39
2026	Santorini Star	5	Tom Marquand	William Haggas	Tony Bloom & Ian McAleavy	2:32.38

== See also ==
- Horse racing in Great Britain
- List of British flat horse races
