= Monteverdi (horse) =

Irish-bred Thoroughbred racehorse (b. 1977)

- Sire: Lyphard
- Grandsire: Northern Dancer
- Dam: Janina
- Damsire: Match
- Sex: Stallion
- Foaled: 10 April 1977
- Country: United States
- Colour: Chestnut
- Breeder: Lawrence Kip McCreery
- Owner: Robert Sangster
- Trainer: Vincent O'Brien
- Record: 8: 4-2-0

Major wins
- National Stakes (1979); Ashford Castle Stakes (1979); Dewhurst Stakes (1979)

Awards
- Timeform best two-year-old (1979); Top-rated European two-year-old (1980); Timeform rating 129 (1979), 123 (1980)
- Last updated on 12 March 2025

Monteverdi (foaled 10 April 1977) was an Irish Thoroughbred racehorse. He was the leading European two-year-old of 1979, when he was unbeaten in four races including the National Stakes, Ashford Castle Stakes and Dewhurst Stakes. His three-year-old season was a disappointment as he failed to win in four races, finishing second in his first two races and then running unplaced in the Irish 2000 Guineas and Derby. He was then retired to stud where he had little success as a sire of winners.

== Background ==
Monteverdi was a small, "neat, quite attractive" chestnut horse with a small white star and white socks on his hind legs bred in Ireland by Lawrence Kip McCreery at his Orchardstown Stud in County Tipperary. He was sired by Lyphard, an American-bred, French-trained stallion who won the Prix Jacques Le Marois and Prix de la Forêt in 1972. At stud in the United States, Lyphard sired many important winner including Three Troikas, Manila and Dancing Brave. Monteverdi's dam Janina, was a half-sister of the Coronation Cup winner Nagami and a great-granddaughter of the outstanding broodmare Athasi, whose other descendants include Trigo, Tulyar and Time Charter.

As a yearling, Monteverdi was bought at Saratoga for $305,000 by representatives of the British businessman Robert Sangster. The colt was returned to Ireland and was sent into training with Vincent O'Brien at Ballydoyle.

== Racing career ==
=== 1979: two-year-old season ===
Monteverdi began his racing career in a six furlong maiden race at Phoenix Park in August. He started the odds-on favourite and won easily from Noble Shamus. Despite his win, he was not considered the Ballydoyle stable's principal contender for the National Stakes, Ireland's most prestigious race for juveniles over seven furlongs at the Curragh in September. His stable companion, Muscovite was made 2/7 favourite, while Monteverdi, ridden by John Oxx's stable jockey Ray Carroll, started a 16/1 outsider. Monteverdi overtook the English-trained filly Millingdale Lillie two furlongs from the finish and won comfortably by two and a half lengths from Cobbler's Cove and Noble Shamus. Two weeks after his win in the National Stakes, Monteverdi reappeared in the Ashford Castle Stakes over a mile at the Curragh. Ridden again by Carroll, he started at odds of 2/5. Despite conceding weight to his seven opponents, he recorded another easy win by one and a half lengths from March Hywel.

In October, Monteverdi was sent to Newmarket in England to contest the seven furlong Dewhurst Stakes, the most important race for two-year-olds run in the United Kingdom. Ridden by Lester Piggott, he started the 15/8 favourite against a field which included Henbit, Romeo Romani (Norfolk Stakes), Marathon Gold (Lanson Champagne Stakes), Final Straw (Champagne Stakes) and Tyrnavos. Monteverdi was restrained in the early stages before accelerating past Henbit and Tyrnavos to take the lead two furlongs from the finish. Monteverdi veered sharply to the left, and Piggott resorted to striking the horse on the head with his whip before he resumed a straight course and won by two lengths from Tyrnavos, with Romeo Romani a length and a half back in third place.

At the end of the season, Monteverdi was the ante-post favourite for the following year's 2000 Guineas and Epsom Derby.

=== 1980: three-year-old season ===
Monteverdi reappeared as a three-year-old in the Group Three McCairns Trial Stakes at Phoenix Park in April and started the 1/3 favourite. He was restrained at the back of the field and, although he finished strongly, was beaten one and a half lengths into second place by the Paddy Prendergast-trained Nikoli. Two weeks later, the colt was sent to Newbury Racecourse in England for the Greenham Stakes, an important trial race for the 2000 Guineas. Starting the 8/13 favourite he was given a vigorous ride by Piggott but was beaten half a length by Final Straw. The form of the race proved exceptionally strong as the third and fourth-placed finishers, Posse and Known Fact, went on to take second and first places in the 2000 Guineas.

Monteverdi was equipped with blinkers for his next race, the Irish 2000 Guineas at the Curragh in May. He was made the 11/4 favourite but finished fifth behind Nikoli, Last Fandango, Final Straw and Posse. In the unsaddling enclosure, Piggott was heard to describe the colt as "useless". The jockey's comments were seen as aggravating the strains in the relationship between Piggott and O'Brien, which saw him replaced as Ballydoyle's retained jockey by Pat Eddery in 1981. Despite his unimpressive form, Monteverdi started third favourite behind Nikoli and Henbit for the 201st Derby on 4 June but was never in contention and finished unplaced. Piggott stated that the colt had failed to "get the trip".

== Assessment ==
In 1979, the independent Timeform organisation awarded Monteverdi a rating of 129, making him their top-rated two-year-old of the season. In the official International Classification he was rated the equal-best two-year-old in Europe, level with the Grand Critérium winner Dragon. He was rated 123 by Timeform in 1980.

== Stud record ==
Monteverdi was retired from racing to become a breeding stallion at the Walmac Farm in Kentucky. He was exported to Venezuela in 1988. He was not particularly successful in either country, with the best of his offspring probably being Great Normand who won the Meadowlands Cup in 1990.

== Pedigree ==
Pedigree of Monteverdi, chestnut stallion, 1977
Sire Lyphard (USA) 1969	Northern Dancer (CAN); 1961	Nearctic	Nearco
Sire Lyphard (USA) 1969	Northern Dancer (CAN); 1961	Nearctic	Lady Angela
Sire Lyphard (USA) 1969	Northern Dancer (CAN); 1961	Natalma	Native Dancer
Sire Lyphard (USA) 1969	Northern Dancer (CAN); 1961	Natalma	Almahmoud
Sire Lyphard (USA) 1969	Goofed (USA); 1960	Court Martial	Fair Trial
Sire Lyphard (USA) 1969	Goofed (USA); 1960	Court Martial	Instantaneous
Sire Lyphard (USA) 1969	Goofed (USA); 1960	Barra	Formor
Sire Lyphard (USA) 1969	Goofed (USA); 1960	Barra	La Favorite
Dam Janina (IRE) 1965	Match (FR); 1958	Tantieme	Deux-Pour-Cent
Dam Janina (IRE) 1965	Match (FR); 1958	Tantieme	Terka
Dam Janina (IRE) 1965	Match (FR); 1958	Relance	Relic
Dam Janina (IRE) 1965	Match (FR); 1958	Relance	Polaire
Dam Janina (IRE) 1965	Jennifer (IRE); 1948	Hyperion	Gainsborough
Dam Janina (IRE) 1965	Jennifer (IRE); 1948	Hyperion	Selene
Dam Janina (IRE) 1965	Jennifer (IRE); 1948	Avena	Blandford
Dam Janina (IRE) 1965	Jennifer (IRE); 1948	Avena	Athasi (Family 22-a)
