= Master Willie =

British-bred Thoroughbred racehorse

- Sire: High Line
- Grandsire: High Hat
- Dam: Fair Winter
- Damsire: Set Fair
- Sex: Stallion
- Foaled: 12 April 1977
- Country: United Kingdom
- Colour: Chestnut
- Breeder: William & Robert Barnett
- Owner: William & Robert Barnett
- Trainer: Henry Candy
- Record: 18: 7-6-1

Major wins
- Easter Stakes (1980); Benson and Hedges Gold Cup (1980); Jockey Club Stakes (1981); Coronation Cup (1981); Eclipse Stakes (1981)

Awards
- Timeform rating: 129

Master Willie (12 April 1977 – October 2001) was a British racehorse and sire. As a three-year-old in 1980 he finished second in The Derby and won the Group One Benson and Hedges Gold Cup. In the following year he added victories in the Coronation Cup and Eclipse Stakes before being retired to stud. He stood as a breeding stallion in the United States, the United Kingdom and Germany with mixed results before his death in 2001.

== Background ==
Master Willie was a chestnut horse with a white blaze and four white socks bred by William and Robert Barnett. He was sired by High Line, a stayer who won three consecutive runnings of the Jockey Club Cup. His dam, Fair Winter, was a top class racemare whose wins included the Nassau Stakes. Like all the Barnett's horses, the colt was trained by Henry Candy at Kingstone Warren in Oxfordshire. He was ridden in most of his races by Candy's stable jockey Philip Waldron.

== Racing career ==
=== 1979: two-year-old season ===
Master Willie ran four times as a two-year-old in 1979, winning two races. He also finished first in the Acomb Stakes but was disqualified and relegated to second place.

=== 1980: three-year-old season ===
Master Willie began his three-year-old season by winning the Easter Stakes at Kempton Park Racecourse before finishing fourth in his next race. At York in May, Master Willie finished second to the Henry Cecil-trained Hello Gorgeous in the Dante Stakes, a major trial race for the Epsom Derby.

At Epsom Downs Racecourse in June, Master Willie was one of twenty-four colts to contest in the 201st running of the Epsom Derby. Starting as a 22/1 outsider, he was settled in mid-division before producing a strong late run to finish second, three quarters of a length behind the winner Henbit. Master Willie started favourite for the Irish Derby at the end of June but was unsuited by the very soft ("gluepot") ground and finished fifth behind Tyrnavos.

At York in August, Master Willie was matched against fillies and older horses in the Benson and Hedges Gold Cup and started at odds of 13/2. He appeared to be under pressure two furlongs from home but finished strongly to take the lead in the last strides to win by half a length from the Irish filly Cairn Rouge. He started favourite for the Valdoe Stakes at Goodwood Racecourse but was beaten one and a half lengths by the four-year-old Welsh Chanter. On his final appearance of the season, Master Willie finished second to Cairn Rouge in the Champion Stakes at Newmarket Racecourse on 18 October.

=== 1981: four-year-old season ===
Master Willie returned as a four-year-old in the Jockey Club Stakes at Newmarket in April. Starting at odds of 2/1 he took an early lead and was never challenged, winning by ten lengths from King's Ride, with Henbit unplaced. Master Willie returned to Epsom for the Coronation Cup in June and was made the 1/2 favourite. On a course covered with litter left behind after the previous day's Derby, he led from the start and won easily from Prince Bee with the filly Vielle in third place. In July the colt was moved back in distance for the Eclipse Stakes over ten furlongs at Sandown Park Racecourse. He started the 6/4 favourite and again made all the running to win by three quarters of a length from Hard Fought (subsequently disqualified) and Vielle. In July he contested the 31st running of the King George VI and Queen Elizabeth Stakes at Ascot. He led for most of the race but faded in the straight and finished fourth behind Shergar. In August Master Willie attempted to win the Benson and Hedges Gold Cup for the second time, but finished third behind Beldale Flutter. Master Willie was rested until October when he finished unplaced behind Vayrann in the Champion Stakes.

== Stud record ==
At the end of his racing career, Master Willie was sold to the Windfields Farm and exported to stand as a breeding stallion in the United States. His sale valued him at $10 million, with Windfields owner E. P. Taylor regarding him as providing an outcross to Northern Dancer. He returned to the United Kingdom in 1988 and also stood in Germany. Master Willie suffered from an arthritic knee in later life and was euthanised at Conduit Farm in Oxfordshire in October 2001. After the horse's death Candy described him as "the most laid-back horse I've had. If you looked at the string from a mile away and there was a big gap in it, it would always be in front of Master Willie".

His best winners included Make A Stand, Chilly Billy (Gimcrack Stakes), Deputy Governor (Eddie Read Handicap), Hollywood Dream (Premio Presidente della Repubblica, Deutschland-Preis) and Master Speaker (Ben Ali Stakes).

== Pedigree ==
Pedigree of Master Willie (GB), chestnut stallion, 1977
Sire High Line (GB) 1966	High Hat (GB); 1957	Hyperion	Gainsborough
Sire High Line (GB) 1966	High Hat (GB); 1957	Hyperion	Selene
Sire High Line (GB) 1966	High Hat (GB); 1957	Madonna	Donatello
Sire High Line (GB) 1966	High Hat (GB); 1957	Madonna	Women's Legion
Sire High Line (GB) 1966	Time Call (GB); 1955	Chanteur	Chateau Bouscaut
Sire High Line (GB) 1966	Time Call (GB); 1955	Chanteur	La Diva
Sire High Line (GB) 1966	Time Call (GB); 1955	Aleria	Djebel
Sire High Line (GB) 1966	Time Call (GB); 1955	Aleria	Canidia
Dam Fair Winter (GB) 1964	Set Fair (GB); 1949	Denturius	Gold Bridge
Dam Fair Winter (GB) 1964	Set Fair (GB); 1949	Denturius	La Solfatara
Dam Fair Winter (GB) 1964	Set Fair (GB); 1949	Ria Geno	Pappageno
Dam Fair Winter (GB) 1964	Set Fair (GB); 1949	Ria Geno	Talaria
Dam Fair Winter (GB) 1964	Winter Gleam (GB); 1959	Aureole	Hyperion
Dam Fair Winter (GB) 1964	Winter Gleam (GB); 1959	Aureole	Angelola
Dam Fair Winter (GB) 1964	Winter Gleam (GB); 1959	Red Winter	My Babu
Dam Fair Winter (GB) 1964	Winter Gleam (GB); 1959	Red Winter	Bold Maid (Family: 4-j)
