= Hethersett (horse) =

British-bred Thoroughbred racehorse

- Sire: Hugh Lupus
- Grandsire: Djebel
- Dam: Bride Elect
- Damsire: Big Game
- Sex: Stallion
- Foaled: 1959
- Country: United Kingdom
- Colour: Bay
- Breeder: Major Lionel Brook Holliday
- Owner: Lionel Holliday
- Trainer: Dick Hern
- Record: 11: 4-3-0 (incomplete)

Major wins
- Great Voltigeur Stakes (1962); St Leger Stakes (1962)

Awards
- Timeform rating 134; Timeform top-rated three-year-old (1962)

Hethersett (1959–1966) was a British Thoroughbred racehorse and sire best known for falling when favourite for The Derby and then winning the classic St Leger Stakes in 1962. After showing promise as a two-year-old he was the highest-rated British three-year-old of 1962 when he also won the Brighton Derby Trial and the Great Voltigeur Stakes. After his success in the Leger, when he gave his trainer Dick Hern his first classic win, Hethersett never won again and was retired in 1963. He had a brief but successful stud career before he died in 1966.

== Background ==
Hethersett was a powerfully-built bay horse with no white markings bred by his owner, Major Lionel Brook Holliday and named after a village in Norfolk. Holliday sent Hethersett to his private Lagrange stable at Newmarket, Suffolk where he was trained by Dick Hern.

Hethersett was sired by Hugh Lupus, a French-bred stallion who won the Champion Stakes in 1956. Hugh Lupus, who was inbred 2 × 3 to the stallion Tourbillon, suffered from low fertility at stud but sired several other good horses including the 1,000 Guineas winner Pourparler. Hugh Lupus and Hethersett were representatives of the Byerley Turk sire line, unlike more than 95% of modern thoroughbreds, who descend directly from the Darley Arabian. Hethersett's dam, Bride Elect (by Big Game) was a fast filly who won the Queen Mary Stakes at Royal Ascot for Holliday in 1954. However her dam, Netherton Maid was a stayer and finished 2nd in the Oaks: Netherton Maid's full sister, Neasham Belle, won the 1951 Oaks. Bride Elect had considerable success as a broodmare, producing several winners including the Eclipse Stakes runner-up Proud Chieftain.

== Racing career ==
=== 1961: two-year-old season ===
Hethersett did not appear as a two-year-old until the autumn when he made a successful debut in the Duke of Edinburgh Stakes over six furlongs (not the modern race of the same name) at Ascot Racecourse. He was then moved up in class and distance for the inaugural running of the Timeform Gold Cup at Doncaster. He finished fifth behind Miralgo, although he appeared to be rather unlucky in running.

=== 1962: three-year-old season ===
Hethersett began his three-year-old season on 15 May by winning the Derby Trial Stakes at Brighton Racecourse by five lengths from River Chanter and Heron. Three weeks later he was then sent to Epsom Downs Racecourse to contest the Derby, and was strongly fancied, despite his lack of experience. Ridden by the forty-five-year-old veteran Harry Carr he started favourite at odds of 9/2 in a field of twenty-six-runners. He appeared to be travelling well in the middle of the field when he was one of seven horses who fell or were brought down in a pile-up just after half distance. Hethersett escaped with minor injuries, but Carr sustained a broken shoulder which kept him out of racing for almost two months. The race was won by the Irish-trained outsider Larkspur.

Hethersett ran poorly on firm ground at Goodwood Racecourse in July, finishing seventh behind Gay Challenger in the Gordon Stakes but returned to form in August at York. Ridden by Frankie Durr in the Great Voltigeur Stakes over 1 1/2 miles he started at odds of 15/2 and won by a short head from Miralgo.

In the St Leger Stakes at Doncaster on 12 September, Hethersett started at odds of 100/8 (12.5/1) with some doubting that he would be effective over the distance of fourteen and a half furlongs on soft ground. Ridden by Carr, he took the lead a furlong and a half from the finish and won easily by four lengths from Monterrico, with Miralgo in third and Larkspur sixth. This was Hern's first of sixteen Classic victories in his career as a trainer. On his final appearance of the season, Hethersett was brought back in distance for the Champion Stakes over one and a quarter miles at Newmarket and finished second to the Irish 2000 Guineas winner Arctic Storm.

The successes of Hethersett enabled Holliday to become British champion owner for the third time, while Hern won the first of his four trainers' championships.

=== 1963: four-year-old season ===
In 1963, Hern gave up his job as Holliday's private trainer and moved to West Ilsley in Berkshire, leaving Hethersett behind at La Grange where the training licence was taken over by Hern's former head-lad, S.J. Meaney. Hethersett failed to win in three starts although he did finish second in both the Jockey Club Stakes and the Coronation Cup (beaten six lengths by Exbury).

== Assessment ==
Hethersett was given a rating of 134 by the independent Timeform organisation, placing him equal with Arctic Storm as the best three-year-old in Europe, a pound below the top-rated four-year-old Match. In their book A Century of Champions, John Randall and Tony Morris rated Hethersett an "average" St Leger winner.

== Stud record ==
Hethersett had little chance to prove himself as a breeding stallion, dying in 1966 at the age of seven after only three years at stud. He showed considerable promise, siring the 1969 Derby winner Blakeney and the filly Highest Hopes (Prix Vermeille). Rarity, a colt from Hethersett's final crop of foals, came within a short-head of beating the then unbeaten Brigadier Gerard in the Champion Stakes at Newmarket in 1971. Hethersett died of a brain tumour on 26 August 1966. Hern speculated that the trouble stemmed from the head injury the colt sustained in the Derby.

== Sire line tree ==
- Hethersett
  - Dalry
  - Heathen
    - Harken
  - Blakeney
    - Norfolk Air
    - Charlotte's Choice
    - Coloso
      - Colosal
    - Julio Mariner
      - Sir Galahad
    - Roscoe Blake
    - Sexton Blake
      - Jung
    - Commodore Blake
    - Sheringham
    - Tyrnavos
      - Dihistan
    - Electric
      - Petrullo
      - Travelling Light
    - Band
    - Castle Rising
      - Abbas
    - Just David
    - Satco
      - Szolarisz
    - Dragon Negro
    - La Yegua
      - Toldeo
  - Harken
  - Nevado
    - Beethoven
  - Schuylerville
    - Avelino
    - Vinetu
    - Ajvanho
    - Armando
  - Healaugh Fox
  - Rarity
    - Decent Fellow
    - Pollerton
    - Rare April
    - Icelandic
      - Mickey's Town
      - Reykjavik
      - Krona
        - Regal Krona
    - Camiros

== Pedigree ==
Pedigree of Hethersett, bay stallion, 1959
Sire Hugh Lupus (FR) 1952	Djebel (FR); 1937	Tourbillon*	Ksar*^
Sire Hugh Lupus (FR) 1952	Djebel (FR); 1937	Tourbillon*	Durban
Sire Hugh Lupus (FR) 1952	Djebel (FR); 1937	Loika	Gay Crusader
Sire Hugh Lupus (FR) 1952	Djebel (FR); 1937	Loika	Coeur a Coeur
Sire Hugh Lupus (FR) 1952	Sakountala (FR); 1942	Goya	Tourbillon*^
Sire Hugh Lupus (FR) 1952	Sakountala (FR); 1942	Goya	Zariba
Sire Hugh Lupus (FR) 1952	Sakountala (FR); 1942	Samos	Bruleur*^
Sire Hugh Lupus (FR) 1952	Sakountala (FR); 1942	Samos	Samya
Dam Bride Elect (GB) 1952	Big Game (GB); 1939	Bahram	Blandford
Dam Bride Elect (GB) 1952	Big Game (GB); 1939	Bahram	Friar's Daughter
Dam Bride Elect (GB) 1952	Big Game (GB); 1939	Myrobella	Tetratema
Dam Bride Elect (GB) 1952	Big Game (GB); 1939	Myrobella	Dolabella
Dam Bride Elect (GB) 1952	Netherton Maid (GB); 1944	Nearco	Pharos
Dam Bride Elect (GB) 1952	Netherton Maid (GB); 1944	Nearco	Nogara
Dam Bride Elect (GB) 1952	Netherton Maid (GB); 1944	Phase	Windsor Lad
Dam Bride Elect (GB) 1952	Netherton Maid (GB); 1944	Phase	Lost Soul (Family:21-a)

* Hethersett is inbred 4S x 3S to the stallion Tourbillon, meaning that he appears fourth and third generation on the sire side of his pedigree.

*^ Hethersett is inbred 5S x 6S x 4S to the stallion Bruleur, meaning that he appears fifth generation (via Ksar)^, sixth generation (via Tourbillon)^ and fourth generation on the sire side of his pedigree.
