= Henbit (horse) =

American-bred Thoroughbred racehorse

- Racing silks of Etti Plesch
- Sire: Hawaii
- Grandsire: Utrillo
- Dam: Chateaucreek
- Damsire: Chateaugay
- Sex: Stallion
- Foaled: 28 March 1977
- Country: United States
- Colour: Bay
- Breeder: Helen Drake Jones
- Owner: Etti Plesch
- Trainer: Dick Hern
- Record: 8: 4-0-0
- Earnings: $430,882

Major wins
- Guardian Classic Trial (1980); Chester Vase (1980); Epsom Derby (1980)

Awards
- Timeform rating 118 (1979), 130 (1980)
- Last updated on August 29, 2007

Henbit (28 March 1977 – 1997) was an American-bred and British-trained Thoroughbred racehorse, best known for winning the Derby in 1980. After winning one minor race as a two-year-old, he showed improved form in 1980 to win the Classic Trial Stakes and the Chester Vase. He won the Derby in a fast time but sustained a leg injury in the race which ruled him out for the rest of the year. He failed when returning as a four-year-old and was retired to stud, where he had limited success as a sire of winners.

== Background ==
Henbit was a "leggy" bay horse bred in Kentucky by Helen Drake Jones, owner of Mineola Farm near Lexington. His sire was Hawaii, a South African Champion at two and three and then in the United States, the 1969 American Champion Turf Horse. Henbit's dam Chateaucreek was a daughter of the 1963 Kentucky Derby winner and American Champion Three-Year-Old Colt, Chateaugay. As a descendant of the American broodmare Some More, Chateacreek came from the branch of Thoroughbred family 3-d which also produced Dancing Brave, Lucky Debonair and Delta Blues.

As a yearling, Henbit was sold for $24,000; he was owned during his racing career by Etti Plesch, who had previously won the Derby with Psidium in 1961 and the Prix de l'Arc de Triomphe in 1970 with Sassafras. Henbit was trained by Dick Hern at West Ilsley and ridden in most of his races by Willie Carson.

== Racing career ==
=== 1979: two-year-old season ===
Henbit made his racecourse debut at Royal Ascot in June 1979, when he finished fourth behind Star Way in the six-furlong Chesham Stakes. He was off the course for three months before reappearing in a one-mile maiden race at Newbury Racecourse. He was always among the leaders in a field of twenty-five runners and won by a length from Val's Mill. On his final appearance of the season, the colt was moved up sharply in class to contest the Group One Dewhurst Stakes over seven furlongs at Newmarket Racecourse in October. He started a 16/1 outsider and finished fourth behind Monteverdi, Tyrnavos and Romeo Romani. In their annual Racehorses of 1979, Timeform described him as a colt who was likely to show better form when tried over longer distances as a three-year-old.

=== 1980: three-year-old season ===
In the spring of 1980, Henbit established himself a fringe contender for the Derby by winning the Classic Trial over one and a quarter miles at Sandown. Although he defeated the Vincent O'Brien-trained Huguenot, he was offered at odds of 33/1 for the Derby, with his stable companion Water Mill being regarded as a stronger candidate. On 6 May, he won the one and a half mile Chester Vase in which he defeated Moomba Masquerade the future St Leger Stakes winner Light Cavalry. Although he did not seem entirely at ease on the tight left-handed circuit he won "very pleasingly" and his odds for Epsom were immediately cut to 16/1. In the next three weeks, Henbit attracted strong support in the betting as several of the market leaders were either withdrawn or ran poorly in trial races.

At Epsom Downs Racecourse in June, Henbit started the 7/1 second favourite, behind the Irish-trained colt Nikoli, for the Derby. The race carried a prize of £166,820, making it the most valuable race run on turf up to that time, and attracted a field of twenty-four runners. The 201st running of the race took place in fine, hot weather and drew an estimated crowd of 500,000 spectators, including Queen Elizabeth II. Carson positioned Henbit just behind the leaders and turned into the straight in fifth place before moving up to challenge in the straight. He took the lead from the outsider Rankin a furlong from the finish, veering sharply to the right as he did so. The colt appeared to recover quickly and held the late challenge of Master Willie to win by three-quarters of a length, with Rankin in third place. Henbit's success in the race was the second in two years for Hern and Carson, who had won with Troy in 1979, and his winning time of 2:34.77 was the fastest since Nijinsky in 1970.

Henbit returned from the race with a large swelling on his right foreleg, and examinations revealed that he had sustained a hairline fracture to his cannon bone. The horse was confined to his box for three months with his leg in plaster.

=== 1981: four-year-old season ===
Henbit returned to the racecourse in 1981, and finished unplaced on his two starts. In the Jockey Club Stakes at Newmarket in April, he led for nine furlongs but dropped away quickly in the closing stages and finished last of the six runners behind Master Willie. In July, he was sent to Ireland for the Royal Whip Stakes at the Curragh. He took the lead two furlongs from the finish but faded into fifth place behind Last Light. He was then retired, with Hern expressing the view that the colt had never mentally fully recovered from his injury.

== Assessment ==
In 1979, Henbit was given a rating of 118 by the independent Timeform organisation, eleven pounds below their top two-year-old, Monteverdi. In the following year, he received a Timeform rating of 130, placing him seven pounds behind the top-rated horse of the year Moorestyle. In their book A Century of Champions, John Randall and Tony Morris rated Henbit an "inferior" Derby winner.

== Stud career ==
Retired to stud in 1982, Henbit sired 152 race winners, but few of his flat-race runners were of any note. He had more success, however, when he was moved to Helshaw Grange Stud in Shropshire and marketed as a sire of jumpers. He sired two leading National Hunt racehorses in Kribensis, winner of the 1990 Champion Hurdle, and Sybillin, a steeplechaser whose wins included the Victor Chandler Chase and Tingle Creek Trophy. Henbit died at age twenty in 1997.

== Pedigree ==
Pedigree of Henbit (USA), bay stallion, 1977
Sire Hawaii (SAF) 1964	Utrillo (ITY); 1958	Toulouse Lautrec	Dante
Sire Hawaii (SAF) 1964	Utrillo (ITY); 1958	Toulouse Lautrec	Tokamura
Sire Hawaii (SAF) 1964	Utrillo (ITY); 1958	Urbinella	Alycidon
Sire Hawaii (SAF) 1964	Utrillo (ITY); 1958	Urbinella	Isle of Capri
Sire Hawaii (SAF) 1964	Ethane (SAF); 1947	Mehrali	Mahmoud
Sire Hawaii (SAF) 1964	Ethane (SAF); 1947	Mehrali	Una
Sire Hawaii (SAF) 1964	Ethane (SAF); 1947	Ethyl	Clustine
Sire Hawaii (SAF) 1964	Ethane (SAF); 1947	Ethyl	Armond
Dam Chateaucreek (USA) 1970	Chateaugay (USA); 1960	Swaps	Khaled
Dam Chateaucreek (USA) 1970	Chateaugay (USA); 1960	Swaps	Iron Reward
Dam Chateaucreek (USA) 1970	Chateaugay (USA); 1960	Banquet Bell	Polynesian
Dam Chateaucreek (USA) 1970	Chateaugay (USA); 1960	Banquet Bell	Dinner Horn
Dam Chateaucreek (USA) 1970	Mooncreek (USA); 1963	Sailor	Eight Thirty
Dam Chateaucreek (USA) 1970	Mooncreek (USA); 1963	Sailor	Flota
Dam Chateaucreek (USA) 1970	Mooncreek (USA); 1963	Ouija	Heliopolis
Dam Chateaucreek (USA) 1970	Mooncreek (USA); 1963	Ouija	Psychist (Family: 3-d)
