= Big Game (horse) =

Irish-bred Thoroughbred racehorse

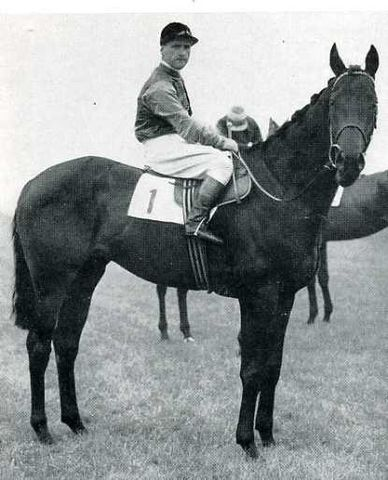
- Big Game and Gordon Richards
- Sire: Bahram
- Grandsire: Blandford
- Dam: Myrobella
- Damsire: Tetratema
- Sex: Stallion
- Foaled: 1939
- Country: Ireland
- Colour: Bay
- Breeder: National Stud
- Owner: King George VI
- Trainer: Fred Darling
- Record: 9:8-0-0

Major wins
- Coventry Stakes (1941); Champagne Stakes (1941); 2000 Guineas (1942); Champion Stakes (1942)

Big Game (1939–1963) was an Irish-bred, British-trained Thoroughbred racehorse and sire. In a career that lasted from April 1941 to October 1942, the colt, who was owned by King George VI, ran nine times and won eight races. He was the best British two-year-old colt of his generation in 1941 when he was unbeaten in five starts. Two further wins the following spring including the 2000 Guineas at Newmarket took his unbeaten run to seven, but he suffered his first defeat when odds-on favourite for the wartime "New Derby". He won his only other race in the Champion Stakes before being retired to stud. Big Game's royal connections and racecourse success made him one of the most popular horses of his time.

== Background ==
Big Game was a powerfully built dark bay horse standing 16.1 hands high, bred by the British National Stud at Tully, County Kildare, in Ireland and leased for his racing career to King George VI. He was sired by the unbeaten Triple Crown winner Bahram, out of Myrobella, an exceptionally fast filly who was rated the best British two-year-old of either sex in 1932. Myrobella was a member of the same thoroughbred family which produced the Epsom Derby winners Sansovino and Snow Knight. Big Game was sent into training with Fred Darling at Beckhampton in Wiltshire.

Big Game's entire career took place during World War II during which horse racing in Britain was subject to many restrictions. Several major racecourses, including Epsom, Ascot and Doncaster, were closed for the duration of the conflict, either for safety reasons, or because they were being used by the military. Many important races were rescheduled to new dates and venues, often at short notice, and all five of the Classics were run at Newmarket.

== Racing career ==
=== 1941: two-year-old season ===
Big Game made his first public appearance in the five furlong Hurstbourne Stakes at his local course at Salisbury in April. He started favourite in a field of twenty runners and won easily, ridden by the Champion Jockey Gordon Richards. Richards sustained a badly broken leg when he was kicked by a horse at Salisbury in May, and Big Game was partnered his other races that year by Harry Wragg, a jockey whose tactical skill and timing led to his being nicknamed "The Head Waiter". The colt ran twice more over the same course and distance, recording easy wins in the Cranbourne Stakes and the Salisbury Plate. On his next appearance, he contested the Coventry Stakes, a race traditionally run at Royal Ascot, but rescheduled to Newmarket, where a crowd of around 15,000 saw him win by five lengths from the future Derby winner Watling Street. On his final start he moved up to six furlongs for the first time as he ran in the Champagne Stakes, which took place that year at Newbury instead of at its usual Doncaster venue. He defeated Watling Street again, but the margin on this occasion was only a short head, leading some to speculate that Big Game was a horse with stamina limitations who would struggle in the following year's Classics.

In the Free Handicap, a ranking of the season's best British two-year-olds, he was the highest-rated colt on a mark of 132 pounds, placing him second overall behind his stable companion, the filly Sun Chariot (133).

=== 1942: three-year-old season ===
On his three-year-old debut, Big Game was tried over seven furlongs in a race at Salisbury and won impressively in a course record time. He was then moved up to one mile for the 2000 Guineas which was run that year on Newmarket's July course rather than the adjoining Rowley Mile. Travel restrictions, which meant that spectators had to walk several miles to reach the course, did not prevent a large attendance. Ridden by Richards, Big Game was made 8/11 favourite against thirteen opponents. He raced just behind the leaders before taking the lead from Ujiji two furlongs from the finish and going clear in the closing stages to win easily by four lengths from Watling Street and Gold Nib. The first "Royal" win in the race since Minoru in 1909 was reportedly received with "such cheering as had not before been heard in the venerable history of Newmarket" despite the fact that the King himself was not present.

A month later, he returned to the July Course for the "New Derby", a wartime substitute for The Derby. Despite the doubts about his ability to cope with the mile and a half distance, he started at odds of 4/6, making him the shortest-priced "Derby" favourite since Gainsborough won at odds of 8/13 in 1918. The King and Queen, accompanied by Princess Elizabeth attended the race for the first time since the outbreak of the war, and anticipation of a royal victory was high. Any chance Big Game had of lasting the distance quickly evaporated as he became anxious and distressed in the preliminaries and then fought the attempts of Richards to restrain him, refusing to settle in the early stages of the race. He was beaten a long way from home and finished sixth of the thirteen runners behind Watling Street. The crowd was reportedly "stunned" by the outcome and greeted the winner in near silence.

Big Game was given another chance to prove himself over middle distances in autumn when he ran in the ten furlong Champion Stakes, run a month earlier than usual on 11 September. He took the lead half a mile from the finish and won decisively from the filly Afterthought and the colt Ujiji who had finished ahead of him when taking third place in the Derby. He was then retired from racing to begin his stud career at the Aislabie Stud at an initial fee of £250.

== Assessment ==
In their book A Century of Champions, Tony Morris and John Randall rated Big Game the fortieth best British racehorse of the 20th Century and the hundredth best in their global ranking.

== Stud career ==
Big Game was based at the National Stud and proved to be a successful sire of winners, but not an outstanding one. His most important winners were the Classic-winning fillies Ambiguity (Epsom Oaks) and Queenpot (1000 Guineas) while the best of his colts was probably the unbeaten Combat. He was the damsire of Hethersett (St Leger) and Arctic Explorer (Eclipse Stakes) and was the Leading broodmare sire in Great Britain and Ireland in 1961 and 1962. His son Khorassan was a successful stallion in New Zealand where he sired Tulloch. Big Game was put down on 1 July 1963 after being diagnosed as suffering from kidney failure.

== Sire line tree ==
- Big Game
  - Combat
    - Combustion
    - Aggressor
      - Streetfighter
        - Blockbuster
      - Fire Crest
      - Activator
      - Chivas Regal
  - Murrayfield
  - Stockade
    - Teranyan
  - Yoyo
  - Henley-In-Arden
  - Hunter's Moon
  - Nebris
  - Bear Dance
  - Bobo
  - Faux Tirage
    - Hot Drop
    - Knave
    - Motueka
    - Seven Seas
    - Straight Draw
    - Amanullah
    - Rover
    - Tira Mink
    - Magician
    - Baraboo
    - Glensharold
    - Game
    - Hodmandod
    - Papillon
      - Tamboura
  - Gigantic
    - Red Crest
    - Royal Duty
    - Empyreus
    - Terrific
    - Mannix
    - Not Again
    - Town Beau
  - Makarpura
    - Best Blend
    - Little Roderick
  - Tembu
  - War Game
  - Jungle King
  - Khorassan
    - Coleridge
    - Melanion
    - Tulloch
    - Royal Khora
    - Baloo
    - Dardanus
  - King's Command
  - Cannon Game
  - Game Law
  - Master Bowman
  - Good Shot
  - Big Burn
    - Reynald
  - Masai King
  - Border Chief
  - Moon Game
    - Yootha
  - Rally
  - Head Hunter
    - Jan's Beau
    - Chimbu
  - Bellagioca

== Pedigree ==
Pedigree of Big Game (GB), bay stallion, 1939
| Sire Bahram (GB) 1932 | Blandford; 1919 | Swynford | John O'Gaunt |
| Sire Bahram (GB) 1932 | Blandford; 1919 | Swynford | Canterbury Pilgrim |
| Sire Bahram (GB) 1932 | Blandford; 1919 | Blanche | White Eagle* |
| Sire Bahram (GB) 1932 | Blandford; 1919 | Blanche | Black Cherry |
| Sire Bahram (GB) 1932 | Friar's Daughter; 1921 | Friar Marcus | Cicero |
| Sire Bahram (GB) 1932 | Friar's Daughter; 1921 | Friar Marcus | Prim Nun |
| Sire Bahram (GB) 1932 | Friar's Daughter; 1921 | Garron Lass | Roseland |
| Sire Bahram (GB) 1932 | Friar's Daughter; 1921 | Garron Lass | Concertina |
| Dam Myrobella (GB) 1930 | Tetratema; 1917 | The Tetrarch | Roi Herode |
| Dam Myrobella (GB) 1930 | Tetratema; 1917 | The Tetrarch | Vahren |
| Dam Myrobella (GB) 1930 | Tetratema; 1917 | Scotch Gift | Symington |
| Dam Myrobella (GB) 1930 | Tetratema; 1917 | Scotch Gift | Maund |
| Dam Myrobella (GB) 1930 | Dolabella; 1911 | White Eagle* | Gallinule* |
| Dam Myrobella (GB) 1930 | Dolabella; 1911 | White Eagle* | Merry Gal* |
| Dam Myrobella (GB) 1930 | Dolabella; 1911 | Gondolette | Loved One |
| Dam Myrobella (GB) 1930 | Dolabella; 1911 | Gondolette | Dongola (Family:6-e) |

* Big Game is inbred 4S x 3D to the stallion White Eagle, meaning that he appears fourth generation on the sire side of his pedigree, and third generation on the dam side of his pedigree.
