= The National Stud =

Thoroughbred stud farm in England

Coordinates: 52.2284°N 0.3456°E

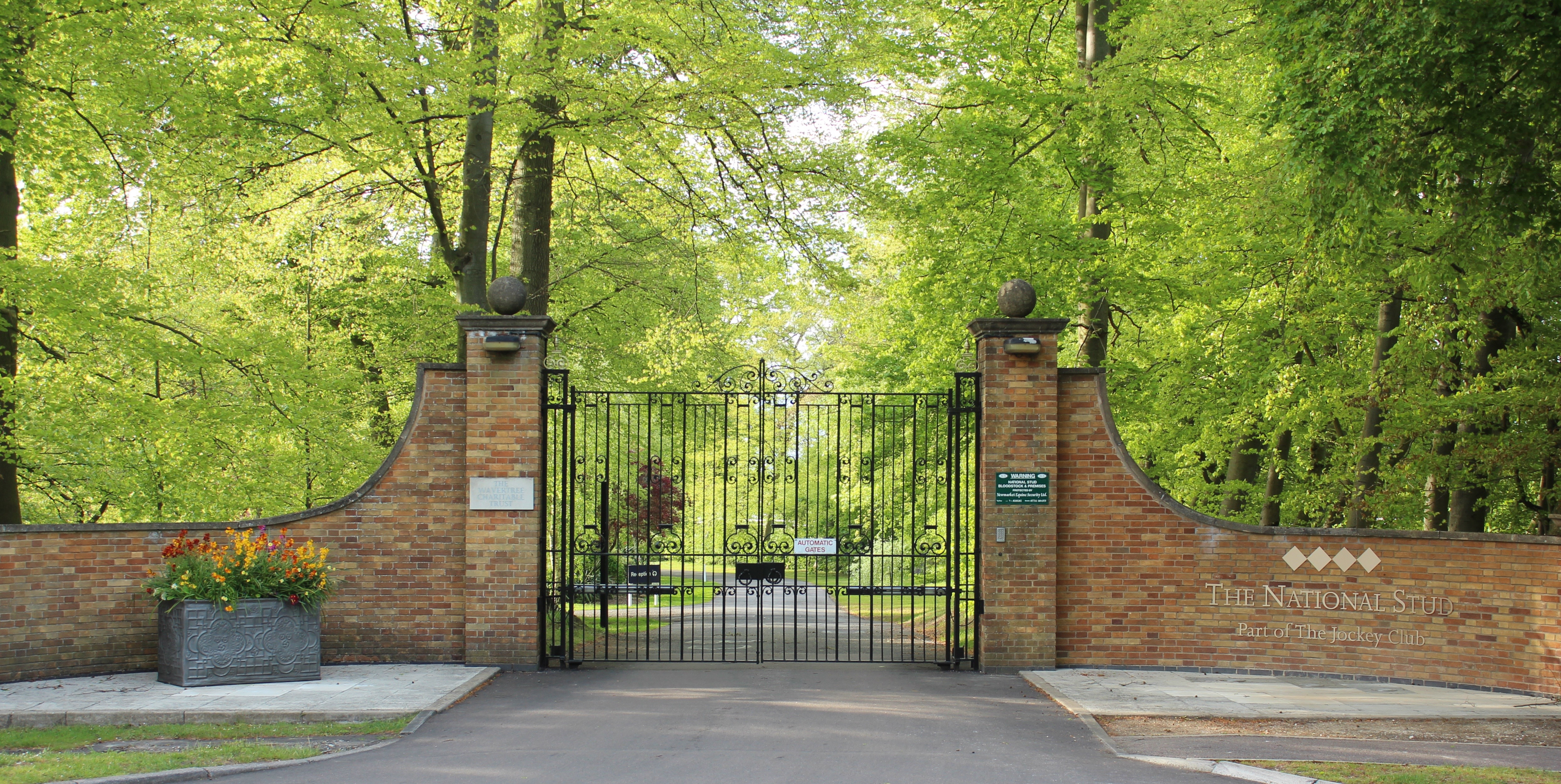
The National Stud, Newmarket, UK

The National Stud is a Thoroughbred stud farm in Newmarket which is owned by the Jockey Club. As well as commercial breeding services, it undertakes education and training activities and allows the public to visit the working stud on organised tours.

== History ==
The National Stud originated in 1916 from a gift to the British Government by William Hall Walker (later Lord Wavertree) of the entire bloodstock of his stud farm in Tully in County Kildare, Ireland. As part of the arrangement, the British government bought the Irish property from Walker for £47,625. The gift of bloodstock consisted of six stallions, 43 brood mares, 29 yearlings and two-year-olds, and 300 shorthorn cattle. The stud was placed under the control of the Ministry of Agriculture, who appointed Henry Greer as its first director. Greer resigned in 1933 and was succeeded by Noble Johnson. Peter Burrell was appointed director in 1937 and remained in post for 33 years. Notable horses bred at Tully included Blandford, Myrobella, Royal Lancer, Big Game, Sun Chariot and Chamossaire.

In 1943, the Irish Government bought the Tully property and established the Irish National Stud on the site. The British bloodstock was transferred to the Sandley Stud at Gillingham, Dorset. The stud's operations were expanded after World War II with the lease of a stud at West Grinstead in Sussex. Stallions to stand at the Dorset and Sussex studs included Tenerani, Never Say Die and Alcide.

Statue of Mill Reef

In 1963 control of the stud was transferred to the Horserace Betting Levy Board and it received no further government funding, becoming "national" in name only. The Levy Board decided to sell the stud's broodmares and operate only as a stallion station. The Gillingham stud was sold and the National Stud found new premises at Newmarket, where the Jockey Club offered the stud a 999-year lease on Bunbury Farm and Heath Stud, together comprising about 500 acres (2 km²) adjacent to the July Course. Work started on the new stud in the autumn of 1964, when the ground was ploughed and sown with grass; thousands of trees, mostly Canadian Maples, were planted the following February. The layout of the stud was decided by director Peter Burrell, while Sussex architect K.M. Benbow designed the buildings. The first stallions, Never Say Die and Tudor Melody, arrived at Newmarket in the autumn of 1966 and the stud was officially opened by the Queen in April 1967. The new stud was designed to house six stallions, some owned wholly by the National Stud and others partly owned by syndicate shareholders. A notable addition to the roster of stallions was Mill Reef, who arrived at the stud in 1973 after his racing career was ended by a leg injury. He is commemorated by a statue at the stud.

In 2007, when a shortage of funds threatened closure, the National Stud was transferred from the Levy Board to the Jockey Club.

== Facilities ==
The National Stud is set in about 500 acres (2 km²) of paddocks on the outskirts of Newmarket off the Cambridge Road, adjacent to the July Course. As of 2022, it had a roster of six stallions and five broodmares. There are facilities for up to 200 horses, including racehorses undergoing rest and recuperation as well as broodmares who are foaling, seasonal or permanent boarders.

The National Stud receives about 10,000 visitors a year on tours organised by Discover Newmarket. It is the only thoroughbred stud in the United Kingdom open to the public on a regular basis. The stud runs residential training courses at various levels for up to 50 students a year.

== Stallions ==
In 2024, there were five stallions standing at the stud: Lope Y Fernandez, Mutasaabeq, Rajasinghe, Stradivarius and Time Test. After the 2024 season, Mutasaabeq and Time Test were sold to India and Turkey respectively, while triple Group 1 winning sprinter Bradsell joined the roster. In 2026, Diego Velazquez, winner of the 2025 Prix Jacques Le Marois became the latest stallion to stand at the National Stud .

== Living legends ==
Two geldings, Lord Windermere (winner of the 2014 Cheltenham Gold Cup) and The Tin Man (winner of three Group 1 races), were retired to the National Stud as living legends. In 2025, they were joined by Kinross. Two retired broodmares and Classic winners, Attraction and Voleuse de Coeurs, share a paddock.
