= Chanteur =

French-bred Thoroughbred racehorse

- Sire: Chateau Bouscaut
- Grandsire: Kircubbin
- Dam: La Diva
- Damsire: Blue Skies
- Sex: Stallion
- Foaled: 1942
- Country: France
- Colour: Brown
- Breeder: François Dupré
- Owner: Duc Decazes, R. Wallon & P. Magot; William Hill
- Trainer: Henry Count
- Record: 26:10-6-4
- Earnings: 4,116,150 francs in France £11,344 in England.

Major wins
- Prix de Fontainebleau (1945); Prix Hocquart (1945); Prix Henry Delamarre (1945); Prix Jean Prat (four-year-olds) (1946); Prix Edmond Blanc (1947); Prix des Sablons (1947); Grand Prix du Tremblay (1947); White Rose Stakes (1947); Winston Churchill Stakes (1947); Coronation Cup (1947)

Awards
- Timeform top-rated older horse (1947); Timeform rating 135; Leading sire in Great Britain and Ireland (1953)

Chanteur (also known as Chanteur II; 1942–1962) was a French Thoroughbred racehorse and sire who was one of a group of French horses, including Caracalla, Marsyas, Arbar and Souverain, which dominated long-distance racing in Europe in the immediate post-war years. Unraced as a two-year-old, Chanteur won the Prix Hocquart in 1945 and the Prix Jean Prat in 1946. He reached his peak as a five-year-old when he won six races including the Prix des Sablons in France and the Coronation Cup in Britain. He was also placed in many important races including the Grand Prix de Paris, Prix de l'Arc de Triomphe, Prix Royal Oak, Prix du Cadran and Ascot Gold Cup. At the end of his racing career he was retired to stand as a breeding stallion in Britain, where he had considerable success as a sire of winners.

== Background ==
Chanteur was a brown horse with a broad white blaze bred by François Dupré at the Haras d'Ouilly stud farm in Pont-d'Ouilly, Calvados. He was the most notable horse sired by Chateau Bouscaut, a French stallion whose wins included the Prix du Jockey Club in 1930 and the Prix du Cadran a year later. Chanteur's dam La Diva was a half-sister to the Grand Critérium winner Pantalon. La Diva later produced La Divine, the dam of Tanerko, a colt who won two runnings of the Grand Prix de Saint-Cloud and sired the Derby winner Relko. Chanteur was trained at Chantilly by the Anglo-French trainer Harry Count. Chanteur was reportedly a horse with a strong character: he was the first horse awake at his stable and would "shout" loudly until he was fed. At exercise he refused to exert himself for an ordinarily-dressed stable lad, only showing interest when he was mounted by a jockey in racing silks. When racing in Britain, and later when standing there as a stallion the horse was known as "Chanteur II".

== Racing career ==
=== 1945: three-year-old season ===
The Second World War led to there being little racing in France in the summer and autumn of 1944 and Chanteur did not run as a two-year-old. In the spring of 1945 he established himself as one of the leading French colts of his generation by winning the Prix de Fontainebleau and the Prix Hocquart at Longchamp Racecourse before running second to Mistral in the Prix Lupin. From then on Chanteur was campaigned in the highest class. He finished fourth in the Prix du Jockey Club, fourth to Ardan in the Grand Prix de Saint-Cloud and second to Caracalla in the Grand Prix de Paris. In autumn he won the Prix Henry Delamarre before finishing third in both the Prix de l'Arc de Triomphe and the Prix Royal Oak.

=== 1946: four-year-old season ===
Chanteur's only important win of 1946 came in May when he won the older horses' version of the Prix Jean Prat (the race now known as the Prix Vicomtesse Vigier) over 3,000 metres at Longchamp. In this race he defeated the outstanding six-year-old stayer Marsyas who had won the race for the last two years. He went on to finish second in the Prix des Sablons (Prix Ganay) over 2000 metres and third to Marsyas in the 4000 meter Prix du Cadran. In June 1946, Chanteur was part of an exceptionally strong team of French stayers sent to Royal Ascot. He proved too good for the British opposition in the two and a half mile Ascot Gold Cup, but finished second, two lengths behind his compatriot Caracalla.

=== 1947: five-year-old season ===
Chanteur began his final season by showing good form over shorter distances, winning the Prix des Sablons and then moving down to 1500 metres to win the Prix Edmond Blanc. He was then sent to Britain where he won the £5,000 Winston Churchill Stakes at Ascot on 24 May and the £2,000 White Rose Stakes at Hurst Park four days later. At this point he was bought by the bookmaker William Hill, although he remained in training with Count in France. The price was reportedly £70,000, the biggest sum paid for a racehorse in Britain, with Hill explaining that he was buying the horse primarily for his stud potential. At Epsom Downs Racecourse in June he recorded his most significant international success when he won the Coronation Cup, beating Marcel Boussac's Coaraze. At Ascot later that month, Chanteur started the 2/11 favourite for the £11,316 Ascot Gold Cup, but was beaten four lengths by the French-trained four-year-old Souverain in the most valuable ever run in Britain up to that time. Shortly after the race, Hill work that the horse would be retired from racing.

== Assessment ==
The independent Timeform organisation assigned a rating of 135 to Chanteur in 1947 (the first year for which annual ratings were published), making him the equal of Souverain as the highest-rated older horse in Europe. Marsyas, who did not race in Britain that year, was not included in the ratings.

In their book A Century of Champions, based on a modified version of the Timeform system, John Randall and Tony Morris rated Chanteur the thirty-seventh best French-trained horse of the 20th century and the third-best horse foaled in 1942, behind Caracalla and Dante.

== Stud record ==
Chanteur was retired from racing to stand at Hill's Sezincote Stud in Gloucestershire, England. He had his greatest success in his second season as a breeding stallion when he sired The Derby winner Pinza whose victories led to Chanteur becoming the Leading sire in Great Britain and Ireland in 1953. His other notable progeny included the British classic winners Cantelo and Only for Life. Chanteur died at the Highclere Stud at Newmarket, Suffolk in 1962.

== Pedigree ==
Pedigree of Chanteur (FR), brown stallion, 1942
Sire Chateau Bouscaut (FR)	Kircubbin (GB)	Captivation	Cyllene
Sire Chateau Bouscaut (FR)	Kircubbin (GB)	Captivation	Charm
Sire Chateau Bouscaut (FR)	Kircubbin (GB)	Avon Hack	Hackler
Sire Chateau Bouscaut (FR)	Kircubbin (GB)	Avon Hack	Avonbeg
Sire Chateau Bouscaut (FR)	Ramondie (FR)	Neil Gow	Marco
Sire Chateau Bouscaut (FR)	Ramondie (FR)	Neil Gow	Chelandry
Sire Chateau Bouscaut (FR)	Ramondie (FR)	La Rille	Macdonald
Sire Chateau Bouscaut (FR)	Ramondie (FR)	La Rille	Recaldia
Dam La Diva (FR)	Blue Skies (FR)	Blandford	Swynford
Dam La Diva (FR)	Blue Skies (FR)	Blandford	Blanche
Dam La Diva (FR)	Blue Skies (FR)	Blue Pill	Sans Souci
Dam La Diva (FR)	Blue Skies (FR)	Blue Pill	Magnesie
Dam La Diva (FR)	La Traviata (FR)	Alcantara	Perth
Dam La Diva (FR)	La Traviata (FR)	Alcantara	Toison d'Or
Dam La Diva (FR)	La Traviata (FR)	Tregaron	Tredennis
Dam La Diva (FR)	La Traviata (FR)	Tregaron	Whinstone (Family: 12)
