= Subjectivist (horse) =

British Thoroughbred racehorse

- Sire: Teofilo
- Grandsire: Galileo
- Dam: Reckoning
- Damsire: Danehill Dancer
- Sex: Colt
- Foaled: 30 March 2017
- Country: United Kingdom
- Colour: Bay
- Breeder: Mascalls Stud
- Owner: Dr Jim Walker
- Trainer: Mark Johnston
- Record: 17: 6-4-4
- Earnings: £894,067

Major wins
- Glasgow Stakes (2020); March Stakes (2020); Prix Royal Oak (2020); Dubai Gold Cup (2021); Ascot Gold Cup (2021)

Subjectivist (foaled 30 March 2017) is a British Thoroughbred racehorse best known for his performances over extended distances. As a two-year-old he showed some promise, winning one minor race from seven attempts as well as finishing runner-up in the Listed Stonehenge Stakes. In the following year he won the Listed Glasgow Stakes, the Group 3 March Stakes as well as being placed in the King George V Stakes and the Gordon Stakes before ending his season with a Group 1 victory in the Prix Royal Oak. As a four-year-old he won the Dubai Gold Cup and the Ascot Gold Cup. He then had a break of twenty months due to injury. He returned to the racecourse as a six-year-old and came third in the Dubai Gold Cup and the Ascot Gold Cup, after which he suffered a setback in training and was retired to stud. He had won six of his twenty races and earned more than £890,000 in prize money.

== Background ==
Subjectivist is a bay horse with a small white star bred in England by Mascalls Stud. In October 2018 he was consigned to the Tattersalls October Yearling Sale and was bought for 62,000 guineas by the trainer Mark Johnston. He entered the ownership of Dr Jim Walker, a Scottish-born, Hong Kong-based economist, and was taken into training by Johnston at Middleham Moor, North Yorkshire.

He was from the ninth crop of foals sired by Teofilo the undefeated European Champion Two-Year-Old of 2006. Teofilo's other European offspring have included Cross Counter, Trading Leather, Pleascach, Twilight Payment and Parish Hall: he has also had great success in Australia where his major winners have included Happy Clapper, Humidor and Kermadec. Subjectivist's dam Reckoning showed good racing ability, winning one minor race and being placed in the Hoppings Stakes, Gillies Fillies' Stakes and Festival Stakes. As a broodmare, she had previously produced Sir Ron Priestley who won the March Stakes and finished second in the St Leger. She was a great-granddaughter of the Irish broodmare La Meillure, making her a close relative of Soldier of Fortune and the Gran Criterium winner Sholokhov as well as a more distant relative of Double Form.

== Racing career ==
=== 2019: two-year-old season ===
Subjectivist began his racing career by finishing second in a novice race (for horses with no more than two previous wins) over seven furlongs on heavy ground at Haydock Park on 7 June. Two weeks later over the same course and distance he went off the 4/11 favourite for a maiden race but was beaten a length into second place by Mystery Power. He was ridden by Jason Hart in a novice race on the synthetic Polytrack surface at Chelmsford City Racecourse on 5 July and recorded his first victory as he took the lead approaching the final furlong and drew away from his three opponents to win "very easily" by seven lengths. The colt was then stepped up in class for the Listed Pat Eddery Stakes later that month but ran poorly and came home last of the six runners. In August he finished second to Mohican Heights in the Stonehenge Stakes at Salisbury Racecourse and in the following month he ran fourth behind Pyledriver in the Ascendant Stakes at Haydock. For his final run of the year he was moved up to Group 3 class for the ten-furlong Zetland Stakes at Newmarket Racecourse but after leading for most of the way he dropped out of contention in the final furlong and came home seventh of the eight runners behind Max Vega.

=== 2020: three-year-old season ===
The 2020 flat racing season in Britain was disrupted by the COVID-19 pandemic and Subjectivist did not reappear until 17 June when he started at odds of 22/1 for the King George V Stakes over one and a half miles at Royal Ascot and finished third behind Hukum and Kipps. On 7 July he carried top weight of 133 pounds in a handicap race over one and three quarter miles at Haydock and finished second by a length to Favorite Moon to whom he was conceding 20 pounds in weight. On 16 July Subjectivist was ridden by Joe Fanning in the Listed Glasgow Stakes over 11 furlongs at Hamilton Park Racecourse. Starting the 7/4 favourite in a five-runner field he led from the start and steadily wound up the pace to win by one and three quarter lengths from Tritonic, with four lengths back to Tulip Fields in third place. After the race Mark Johnston said "This horse could be targeted at the St Leger as his half-brother Sir Ron Priestley was second in last year’s Leger. They have similar profiles although Subjectivist is rated higher at this stage of his career. He is a lovely horse and very progressive – obviously he will be suited by a step back up in trip". Fanning went on to ride Subjectivist in all his subsequent races.

Two weeks after his win at Hamilton, similar tactics were employed by Fanning on Subjectivist in the Group 3 Gordon Stakes at Goodwood Racecourse but on this occasion he was overtaken inside the final furlong and was beaten into third place by Mogul and Highland Chief. In the Group 2 Great Voltigeur Stakes at York Racecourse on 19 August he set the pace again but faded badly in the last quarter mile and came home seventh behind Pyledriver, beaten eight lengths by the winner. Ten days later Subjectivist went off the 11/10 favourite in a four-runner field for the March Stakes over fourteen furlongs at Goodwood. Fanning sent him into the lead from the start and the colt drew away from his opponents in the straight to win by fifteen lengths from the filly Cabaletta (winner of the Aphrodite Stakes). Johnston said: “It was not the plan to come here... We went to the Voltigeur... but it didn't work. I felt straight afterwards that we had to come here to see if he was a better horse over a mile and six... When it broke up to a small field we had to go for it. On the basis of that, he will have an easy fortnight now and provided he is OK, he will go to the Leger."

In the Group 1 St Leger Stakes over fourteen and a half furlongs at Doncaster Racecourse on 12 September at Doncaster Racecourse Subjectivist started a 16/1 outsider and came home seventh behind Galileo Chrome weakening in the closing stages after disputing the lead for most of the way. On 25 October Subjectivist was sent to France for the Prix Royal-Oak over 3100 metres on heavy ground at Longchamp Racecourse in which he was matched against older horses for the first time. He started the 6/1 third favourite behind Valia (Prix Chaudenay) and Princess Zoe in an eight-runner field which also included Holdthasigreen (winner of the race in 2018). With Fanning in the saddle, Subjectivist made all the running and kept on well in the straight to win by two lengths from Valia, despite hanging to the left in the closing stages. Mark Johnston commented "He's hung in the straight, and if he'd lost, we would have been very upset, but as he's won, it doesn't really matter. It's fantastic. Staying has always been the plan for him, and he's just done it a little bit sooner than we had originally planned. The idea was that he would always be a Cup horse for next year, and he's proved himself a Cup horse already."

=== 2021: four-year-old season ===
Subjectivist began the season by contesting the Group 2 Dubai Gold Cup run over two miles at Meydan in Dubai in the United Arab Emirates. Fanning took Subjectivist, who started as 13/2 joint third-favourite, into the lead at the top of the home straight and won by five and three-quarter lengths, with outsiders Walderbe and Away He Goes in second and third places and the more fancied horses several lengths further back.

Subjectivist's next race was the Ascot Gold Cup on 17 June at the Royal Ascot meeting. He started as 13/2 second favourite in a field of twelve which included odds-on favourite Stradivarius, who was attempting to win the race for the fourth year running. Fanning kicked clear over two furlongs out and went on to win by five lengths from outsider Princess Zoe, with Spanish Mission and Stradivarius in third and fourth places. Following the race, Subjectivist suffered a tendon injury and did not race again until 2023.

=== 2023: six-year-old season and retirement ===
On 25 February, after a break of twenty months, Subjectivist returned to the racecourse to contest the Group 3 Red Sea Turf Handicap on Saudi Cup Night in Riyadh. It was three days after Charlie Johnston had taken over the training license from his father Mark. Subjectivist came twelfth of the thirteen runners, ten lengths behind winner Silver Sonic. A month later, he attempted to regain the Dubai Gold Cup, which he had won in 2021. Starting at odds of 11/1 in a field of fifteen, he came third, five lengths behind winner Broome. At Royal Ascot in June, he attempted to regain the Ascot Gold Cup he had won in 2021. Starting second favourite at 9/2 in a field of twelve, he was beaten into third place by Courage Mon Ami and favourite Coltrane. In July he suffered a setback while training in preparation for a final race in the Goodwood Cup and a decision was made to retire him to stud. He had won six of his twenty races, including two Group 1 races, and earned £894,067 in prize money.

== Breeding career ==
Subjectivist joined the stallion roster at Alne Park Stud in Warwickshire, run by the Skelton family. His fee for 2024 was £4,000. After two seasons, he moved to Chapel Stud in Worcestershire as the Skeltons ceased the stallion side of their operation.

== Pedigree ==
Pedigree of Subjectivist (GB), bay colt, 2017
Sire Teofilo (IRE) 2004	Galileo (IRE); 1998	Sadler's Wells (USA)	Northern Dancer (CAN)
Sire Teofilo (IRE) 2004	Galileo (IRE); 1998	Sadler's Wells (USA)	Fairy Bridge
Sire Teofilo (IRE) 2004	Galileo (IRE); 1998	Urban Sea (USA)	Miswaki
Sire Teofilo (IRE) 2004	Galileo (IRE); 1998	Urban Sea (USA)	Allegretta (GB)
Sire Teofilo (IRE) 2004	Speirbhean (IRE); 1998	Danehill (USA)	Danzig
Sire Teofilo (IRE) 2004	Speirbhean (IRE); 1998	Danehill (USA)	Razyana
Sire Teofilo (IRE) 2004	Speirbhean (IRE); 1998	Saviour (USA)	Majestic Light
Sire Teofilo (IRE) 2004	Speirbhean (IRE); 1998	Saviour (USA)	Victorian Queen (CAN)
Dam Reckoning (IRE) 2009	Danehill Dancer (IRE); 1993	Danehill (USA)	Danzig
Dam Reckoning (IRE) 2009	Danehill Dancer (IRE); 1993	Danehill (USA)	Razyana
Dam Reckoning (IRE) 2009	Danehill Dancer (IRE); 1993	Mira Adonde (USA)	Sharpen Up (GB)
Dam Reckoning (IRE) 2009	Danehill Dancer (IRE); 1993	Mira Adonde (USA)	Lettre d'Amour
Dam Reckoning (IRE) 2009	Great Hope (IRE); 2003	Halling (USA)	Diesis (GB)
Dam Reckoning (IRE) 2009	Great Hope (IRE); 2003	Halling (USA)	Dance Machine (GB)
Dam Reckoning (IRE) 2009	Great Hope (IRE); 2003	Aspiration	Sadler's Wells (USA)
Dam Reckoning (IRE) 2009	Great Hope (IRE); 2003	Aspiration	La Meilleure (Family: 14-c)

- Subjectivist was inbred 3 × 3 to Danehill, meaning that this stallion twice in the third generation of his pedigree. He was also inbred 3 × 4 to Sadler's Wells.
