= M-Lolshan =

Irish-bred Thoroughbred racehorse

- Sire: Levmoss
- Grandsire: Le Levanstell
- Dam: Supreme Lady
- Damsire: Grey Sovereign
- Sex: Stallion
- Foaled: 22 May 1975
- Country: Ireland
- Colour: Brown
- Owner: Essa Alkhalifa
- Trainer: Ryan Price
- Record: 22: 6-6-7

Major wins
- King George V Stakes (1978); Irish St Leger (1978); Grosser Preis von Baden (1979)

Awards
- Timeform rating 101 (1977), 125 (1978), 121 (1979)

M-Lolshan (22 May 1975 – after 1998) was a British Thoroughbred racehorse and sire. He was a tough and consistent middle distance horse who won or placed in 19 of his 22 races. After winning one of his three starts as a juvenile in 1977, he made steady improvement as a three-year-old, winning the King George V Stakes in June and the Irish St Leger in October as well as being placed in the St Leger, March Stakes and Geoffrey Freer Stakes. In 1979 he won the Grosser Preis von Baden and was placed in the Princess of Wales's Stakes, Geoffrey Freer Stakes and Preis von Europa as well as finishing fourth in both the Coronation Cup and the King George VI and Queen Elizabeth Stakes. He made little impact as a breeding stallion.

== Background ==
M-Lolshan was a "lengthy" brown horse with no white marking bred in Ireland. As a yearling he was put up for auction at the Houghton Sale at Newmarket and was sold for 10,000 guineas. He entered the ownership of Essa Alkhalifa and was sent into training with Ryan Price at Findon in West Sussex.

He was one of the best horses sired by the outstanding stayer Levmoss, who won the Ascot Gold Cup and the Prix de l'Arc de Triomphe in 1969. Levmoss was a representative of the Byerley Turk sire line, unlike more than 95% of modern thoroughbreds, who descend directly from the Darley Arabian. M-Lolshan's dam Supreme Lady, who won one race as a two-year-old in 1967, and also produced Ladytown, the grand-dam of Vinnie Roe.

== Racing career ==
=== 1977: two-year-old season ===
After finishing third over seven furlongs on his racecourse debut M-Lolshan contested a 23-runner maiden race over one mile at Newbury Racecourse in September. He accelerated away from his opponents in the closing stages and won by three lengths from Ponte Vecchio. In his only other start he was brought back in distance and finished third behind Home Run and Dactylographer in the Philips Electrical Stakes over seven furlongs at Ascot Racecourse. At the end of the year the Independent Timeform organisation gave him a rating of 101, 29 pounds behind their top two-year-old Try My Best.

=== 1978: three-year-old season ===
In 1978 M-Lolshan finished second in his first three starts and was then moved up in distance and looked somewhat unlucky when narrowly beaten by the four-year-old Pollerton in the Golden Jubilee Handicap at Kempton Park Racecourse in June. Later that month he was sent to Royal Ascot for the King George V Handicap over one and a half miles and recorded his first victory of the campaign as he won very easily by four lengths. He followed up by winning a handicap over fourteen furlongs at Newmarket Racecourse in July.

M-Lolshan was moved up in class after his handicap wins and finished third to Ile de Bourbon in the Group 2 Geoffrey Freer Stakes at Newbury in August. Later that month he contested the March Stakes (a trial race for the St Leger) at Goodwood Racecourse and finished third behind Le Moss and Obraztsovy (also trained by Price). In the St Leger at Doncaster Racecourse in September he started a 28/1 outsider but exceeded expectations as he finished third, beaten one and a half lengths and a head by Julio Mariner and Le Moss, with Obraztsovy, Ile de Bourbon and Galiani (winner of the Grand Prix de Paris) finishing behind.

On 7 October at the Curragh M-Lolshan, ridden by Brian Taylor started 2/1 favourite for the Irish St Leger over fourteen furlongs. The best of his seven opponents appeared to be Icelandic (Chester Vase), Valley Forge (Blandford Stakes), the filly Sorbus (disqualified after finishing first in the Irish Oaks) and Valour (Grosser Preis von Baden). M-Lolshan took the lead two furlongs from the finish and fought off the sustained challenge of Sorbus to win by three quarters of a length with Valley Forge a head away in third.

Timeform gave him a rating of 125 for 1978, eight pounds behind Ile de Bourbon, who was their top-rated three-year-old. The official International classification however, were less impressed and rated him 12 pounds inferior to Ile de Bourbon.

=== 1979: four-year-old season ===
After finishing third in the Aston Park Stakes on his first appearance of 1979, M-Lolshan appeared to be unsuited by the soft ground when running fourth behind Ile de Bourbon in the Coronation Cup at Epsom Racecourse in June. In July he ran second to the three-year-old Milford in the Princess of Wales's Stakes at Newmarket and then finished fourth to Troy, Gay Mecene and Ela-Mana-Mou in the King George VI and Queen Elizabeth Stakes at Ascot. In August he recorded his first victory of the campaign by winning a minor race over one and a half miles at Lingfield Park Racecourse and then finished second to the three-year-old Niniski in the Geoffrey Freer Stakes. In the following month he was sent to Germany for the Grosser Preis von Baden over 2400 metres and was equipped with blinkers for the first time. Ridden by Taylor he won his second Group 1 race as he defeated the Deutsches Derby winner Königsstuhl by one and a quarter lengths. He returned to Germany in October for the Preis von Europa at Cologne but was beaten into third place by Nebos and the Polish champion Czubaryk.

== Stud record ==
After his retirement from racing M-Lolshan became a breeding stallion in Germany. Apart from his duties as a sire of Thoroughbreds he was also used a sire of German Warmbloods including Trakehner horses.

== Pedigree ==
Pedigree of M-Lolshan (IRE), brown stallion, 1975
Sire Levmoss (IRE) 1965	Le Levanstell (IRE); 1957	Le Lavandou	Djebel
Sire Levmoss (IRE) 1965	Le Levanstell (IRE); 1957	Le Lavandou	Lavande
Sire Levmoss (IRE) 1965	Le Levanstell (IRE); 1957	Stella's Sister	Ballyogan
Sire Levmoss (IRE) 1965	Le Levanstell (IRE); 1957	Stella's Sister	My Aid
Sire Levmoss (IRE) 1965	Feemoss (IRE); 1960	Ballymoss	Mossborough
Sire Levmoss (IRE) 1965	Feemoss (IRE); 1960	Ballymoss	Indian Call
Sire Levmoss (IRE) 1965	Feemoss (IRE); 1960	Feevagh	Solar Slipper
Sire Levmoss (IRE) 1965	Feemoss (IRE); 1960	Feevagh	Astrid Wood
Dam Supreme Lady (GB) 1965	Grey Sovereign (GB); 1948	Nasrullah	Nearco
Dam Supreme Lady (GB) 1965	Grey Sovereign (GB); 1948	Nasrullah	Mumtaz Begum
Dam Supreme Lady (GB) 1965	Grey Sovereign (GB); 1948	Kong	Baytown
Dam Supreme Lady (GB) 1965	Grey Sovereign (GB); 1948	Kong	Clang
Dam Supreme Lady (GB) 1965	Ulupi's Sister (GB); 1955	Combat	Big Game
Dam Supreme Lady (GB) 1965	Ulupi's Sister (GB); 1955	Combat	Commotion
Dam Supreme Lady (GB) 1965	Ulupi's Sister (GB); 1955	Puff Adder	Easton
Dam Supreme Lady (GB) 1965	Ulupi's Sister (GB); 1955	Puff Adder	Madder (Family:19)
