= Dubai Gold Cup =

- Class: Group 2
- Location: Meydan Racecourse; Dubai, United Arab Emirates
- Inaugurated: 2012
- Race type: Thoroughbred – Flat racing
- Website: Dubai World Cup

Race information
- Distance: 3,200 metres (abt 2 miles)
- Surface: Turf
- Track: left-handed
- Qualification: Three-years-old and up

The Dubai Gold Cup is a thoroughbred horse race held in Meydan Racecourse, Dubai, United Arab Emirates. It was first run in 2012 as part of Dubai World Cup night. It was initially a Group 3 race and has been run at Group 2 level since 2014.

The first running of the race was marred by the fatal injury sustained by Fox Hunt. The race was abandoned and rerun later that evening.

== Records ==
Speed record:

- 3:16.83 – Broome (2023)

Most wins: 3

- Vazirabad: (2016, 2017, 2018)

Most wins by a jockey (3):

- Christophe Soumillon: Vazirabad (2016, 2017, 2018)

Most wins by a trainer (3):

- Alain de Royer-Dupré: Vazirabad (2016, 2017, 2018)

Most wins by an owner (4):

- Godolphin: Opinion Poll (2012), Cavalryman (2013), Cross Counter (2019), Dubai Future (2025)

== Winners ==
Year	Winner	Age	Jockey	Trainer	Owner	Time
2012	Opinion Poll	6	Frankie Dettori	Mahmood Al Zarooni	Godolphin Racing	3:23.73
2013	Cavalryman	7	Silvestre de Sousa	Saeed bin Suroor	Godolphin Racing	3:25.31
2014	Certerach	6	Jamie Spencer	Michael Halford	Paul Rooney	3:23.14
2015	Brown Panther	7	Richard Kingscote	Tom Dascombe	A Black & Michael Owen	3:18.84
2016	Vazirabad	4	Christophe Soumillon	Alain de Royer Dupre	Aga Khan IV	3:19.56
2017	Vazirabad	5	Christophe Soumillon	Alain de Royer Dupre	Aga Khan IV	3:22.52
2018	Vazirabad	6	Christophe Soumillon	Alain de Royer Dupre	Aga Khan IV	3:17.92
2019	Cross Counter	4	William Buick	Charlie Appleby	Godolphin Racing	3:19.00
2020	Cancelled due to the COVID-19 pandemic.					
2021	Subjectivist	4	Joe Fanning	Mark Johnston	Dr Jim Walker	3:17.77
2022	Stay Foolish	7	Christophe Lemaire	Yoshito Yahagi	Shadai Racehorse	3:19.64
2023	Broome	7	Ryan Moore	Aidan O'Brien	Derrick Smith, Susan Magnier, Michael Tabor & Masaaki Matsushima	3:16:83
2024	Tower of London	4	Ryan Moore	Aidan O'Brien	Tabor / Smith / Magnier / Westerberg	3:17.29
2025	Dubai Future	9	Silvestre de Sousa	Saeed bin Suroor	Godolphin Racing	3:21.50
2026	Fairy Glen	5	Mickael Barzalona	Simon & Ed Crisford	Hamdan bin Mohammed Al Maktoum	3:20.04

== See also ==
- List of United Arab Emirates horse races
