= Brocklesby Stakes =

Flat horse race in Britain

- Class: Class 2
- Location: Doncaster Racecourse; Doncaster, England
- Race type: Flat / Thoroughbred
- Website: www.doncaster-racecourse.co.uk

Race information
- Distance: 5f 3y
- Surface: Turf
- Track: Straight
- Qualification: Two-year-olds
- Weight: 9 st 7 lb Allowances; 5 lb for fillies
- Purse: £40,000 (2024); 1st: £20,616

Brocklesby Conditions Stakes
2026
| A Bear Affair | Dance A Jig | Blixen Force |

Previous years
2025
Norman's Cay | Son Of Sarabi | Exclamation
2024
Zminiature | Bob The Bandit | Indication Ember
2023
Doddie's Impact | Valadero | Charged Up
2022
Persian Force | Primrose Ridge | Jiffy Boy
2021
Chipotle | Wonderful World | Makalu

2020-2011
2019
Show Me Show Me | Strong Power | Zulu Zander
2018
Izzer | Broken Spear | Wasntexpectingthat
2017(Div I)
Santry | Last Page | Benadalid
2016
The Last Lion | Simmy's Temple | Monte Cinq
2015
Ravenhoe | First Bombardment | General Alexander
2014
Cock of the North | Paddy Again | Flyball
2013
Mick's Yer Man | Vodka Time | Lord Clyde
2012
My Boy Bill | Well Acquainted | Mayfield Girl
2011
He's So Cool | Redair | Crowning Star

2010-2001
2010
Chiswick Bey | Lady Brookie | Squires Gate
2009
Hearts of Fire | Archers Road | Swilly Ferry
2008
Sally's Dilemma | Doncaster Rover | Knavesmire
2007
Mister Hardy | Fol Hollow | Portrush Storm
2006
Spoof Master | Rouen | Everyman
2005
Phantom Whisper | Danjet | Stephanies Dream
2004
Next Time Around | Dance Night | Westbrook Blue
2003
Red Power | Farewell To Arms | Bella Tutrice
2002
The Lord | Pertemps Magus | Niteowl Dream
2001
Shuffling Kid | Double Play | Magic Trick

2000-1991
2000
Nearly A Fool | Shoeshine Boy | Milly's Lass
1999
Seraphina | Lord Bankes | Top of the Class
1998
Charlene Lacy | Principality | Damalis
1997
Blueridge Dancer | Mister Bankes | Stately Princess
1996
Indian Spark | Joint Venture | Muchea
1995
World Premier | Johayro | Don't Forget Mikie
1994
Mind Games | Jobran | Hinton Rock
1993
Bandon Castle | Indian Dreamer | Culsyth Flyer
1992
Touch Silver | Nominator | Sabre Rattler
1991
Sylvan Sabre | Regal Chimes | Robins Arrow

1990-1988
1990
Itsagame | David's Flight | Rhythmic Dancer
1989
Red Henry | Champagne Gold | The Irish Sheik
1988
Denham Green | Carry On Cary | Outstanding Bill

The Brocklesby Stakes is a flat conditions race horse race in Great Britain open to horses aged two years. It is notable as the traditional opening two-year-old race of the British Flat racing season. It is run over five furlongs at Doncaster Racecourse.

== History ==
The Brocklesby was first run in 1849 as an all-age 12 furlong race at the now defunct Carholme racecourse in Lincoln, but became a five furlong race for two-year-olds in 1875. From 1905-1912 it was run over a distance of 4 furlongs and fifty yards. It moved to Doncaster in 1965, where it appears on the same card as the Lincolnshire Handicap, also previously run at Carholme. Arguably the best horse to win the race was Donovan, in 1888. Donovan went on to win The Derby and the St Leger in 1889. Other top class horses to win the race have included Semolina, Deep Diver, Provideo, The Last Lion and Hearts of Fire.

== Winners since 1896 ==
- Separate divisions of the race indicated by (1) and (2).

| Year | Winner | Jockey | Trainer | Time |
|---|---|---|---|---|
| 1896 | Jest | Tommy Loates | John Watson |
| 1897 | Gay Lothian | John Watts | John Watson |
| 1898 | Amurath | Tommy Loates | John Watson | 1:02.80 |
| 1899 | Hulcot | Tommy Loates | John Watson | 1:03.40 |
| 1900 | Britannia (Note: In 1900, Britannia was unnamed and ran as Filly by Melton out of Britta.) | Skeets Martin | Gilbert | 1:05.80 |
| 1901 | Fast Castle | Kempton Cannon | John Watson | 1:03.80 |
| 1902 | Skyscraper | Kempton Cannon | John Watson | 1:04.20 |
| 1903 |
| 1904 | Vedas | George McCall | Jack Robinson | 1:04.80 |
| 1905 | Crathorne (Note: In 1905, Crathorne was unnamed and ran as Colt by Donovan.) | Mr George Thursby | G Edwards | 0:57.20 |
| 1906 | Luisis | Bernard Dillon | Tom Waugh | 0:53.80 |
| 1907 | Counterfeit | Walter Griggs | G Edwards |
| 1908 | Miss Geddes | Danny Maher | Fred Day | 0:58.80 |
| 1909 | Dalnacrag | Herbert Jones | Felix Leach | 0:55.60 |
| 1910 | Foot Guard | Freddie Fox | Fred MacCabe | 0:53.80 |
| 1911 | Mr Peeper | Fred Rickaby jr. | Joe Butters |
| 1912 | Polonium | Danny Maher | Tom Cannon jr. |
| 1913 | Decagone | Frank Bullock | Reg Day |
| 1914 | Security | Fred Templeman | John Hallick | 1:04.80 |
| 1915 | King's Day | Walter Griggs | Samuel Pickering |
| 1916-18 | no race |
| 1919 | Lacrosse | Joe Childs | Sam Loates |
| 1920 | Napolyon | Bernard Carslake | Sam Loates |
| 1921 | Deja Thorris | Frank Bullock | Walter Griggs | 1:05.60 |
| 1922 | Black Mask (Note: In 1922, Black Mask was unnamed and ran as St Olive colt.) | Frank Bullock | Charles Morton | 1:04.40 |
| 1923 | Obliterate (Note: In 1923, Obliterate was unnamed and ran as Damage colt.) | William Griggs | Robert Colling | 1:04.80 |
| 1924 | Swanage | Charlie Elliott | Jack Jarvis | 1:05.40 |
| 1925 | Nothing Venture (Note: In 1925, Nothing Venture was unnamed and ran as Risky colt.) | Jack Leach | Felix Leach | 1:04.60 |
| 1926 | Red Tigress (Note: In 1926, Red Tigress was unnamed and ran as Puma filly.) | Bobby Jones | Jack Watts | 1:05.60 |
| 1927 (dh) | Tempting; Twinkling | Freddy Lane; Richard Perryman | Ted Gwilth; John Watson | 1:03.60 |
| 1928 | Murphy | Gordon Richards | Ted Gwilt | 1:06.40 |
| 1929 | No Fear | Cecil Ray | Etienne De Mestre |
| 1930 | Tourmaline | Charlie Elliott | Basil Jarvis | 1:03.40 |
| 1931 | Pistoia | Bernard Carslake | Basil Jarvis | 1:02.80 |
| 1932 | Maranon colt | Rufus Beasley | Basil Briscoe | 1:04.60 |
| 1933 | Petronilla | Harry Beasley Jr. | Atty Persse | 1:08.20 |
| 1934 | Vermeil II | Richard Perryman | Frank Butters | 1:04.20 |
| 1935 | Tetrazone | Eph Smith | Jack Jarvis | 1:01.80 |
| 1936 (dh) | Arabian Myth; Tap Dancer | Jack Sirett; Arthur Wragg | Vic Smyth; Tommy Hogg | 1:05.20 |
| 1937 | Koa | Jack Sirett | Vic Smyth | 1:10.80 |
| 1938 | Canticle (Note: In 1938, Canticle was unnamed and ran as Versicle colt.) | Eph Smith | Jack Jarvis | 1:03.40 |
| 1939 | Puma | Joseph Marshall | Victor Gilpin | 1:05.60 |
| 1940 | Lionetta | Billy Nevett | Charles Elsey | 1:04.80 |
| 1941 | Umballa | Richard Perryman | Walter Earl | 1:06.80 |
| 1942-45 | no race |
| 1946 | Compressor | William Wells | Chubb Leach | 1:04.60 |
| 1947 | Margaret Ann | Dennis Buckle | Ernie Davey | 1:11.20 |
| 1948 | Indian Chalice | Dennis Buckle | Ernie Davey | 1:01.20 |
| 1949 | Peace Trial | Harry Carr | Dick Warden | 1:14.00 |
| 1950 | Prince D'Ouilly | Doug Page | Norman Scobie | 1:15.20 |
| 1951 | Bondage | Doug Smith | Harry Peacock | 1:05.80 |
| 1952 | Maid Of The Woods | Ron Sheather | Ernie Davey | 1:06.20 |
| 1953 | Factory Girl | Stan Clayton | Humphrey Cottrill | 1:03.80 |
| 1954 | Knot | Doug Smith | Geoffrey Brooke | 1:06.20 |
| 1955 | Vermeil | Eph Smith | John Waugh | 1:09.20 |
| 1956 | Fair Gledhill | Lionel Brown | Ernie Davey | 1:05.20 |
| 1957 | Offspring | Willie Snaith | Humphrey Cottrill | 1:05.60 |
| 1958 | Plaudit | Stan Clayton | Dick Hern | 1:04.00 |
| 1959 | Near Naples | Edgar Britt | Charles Elsey | 1:07.20 |
| 1960 | Indian Lad | Eph Smith | Ted Leader | 1:02.60 |
| 1961 | Dipper | Eddie Larkin | Jack Jarvis | 1:01.40 |
| 1962 | Siren | Doug Smith | Geoffrey Brooke | 1:01.40 |
| 1963 | Colony | Denis Ryan | Willie Stephenson | 1:03.60 |
| 1964 | Grey Wave | Brian Taylor | Harvey Leader | 1:05.40 |
| 1965 | America | Eddie Hide | Bill Elsey | 1:05.80 |
| 1966 | Palasrullah | Bruce Raymond | Humphrey Cottrill | 1:03.00 |
| 1967 | Chebs Lad | Brian Connorton | Snowy Gray | 1:01.00 |
| 1968 | Merry Hell | Jock Wilson | Brian Swift | 1:06.00 |
| 1969 | Palyana | Geoff Lewis | Staff Ingham | 1:04.40 |
| 1970 | Royal Louise | Paul Tulk | Tommy Fairhurst | 1:04.80 |
| 1971 | Deep Diver | Frankie Durr | Paul Davey | 1:02.40 |
| 1972 | Scotch Oliver | Jimmy Lindley | Denys Smith | 1:04.60 |
| 1973 | Alexben | John Curant | Ken Payne | 1:03.06 |
| 1974 | Farewell Bleep | Richard Marshall | Bill Marshall | 1:05.55 |
| 1975 | First Quay | Pat Kelleher | Denys Smith | 1:07.66 |
| 1976 | Red Johnnie | Willie Carson | Clive Brittain | 1:03.93 |
| 1977 | Lime Grove | Greville Starkey | C Hill | 1:06.21 |
| 1978 | Middleham | Eddie Hide | Ernie Weymes | 1:00.62 |
| 1979 | Bohle | William Higgins | Tommy Tairhurst | 1:08.55 |
| 1980 | Gamma | Walter Wharton jr | Walter Wharton | 1:05.62 |
| 1981 | Hollywood Party | Steve Cauthen | Barry Hills | 1:08.13 |
| 1982 | Brondesbury | Tony Ives | Bill O'Gorman | 1:03.75 |
| 1983 | Our Dynasty | Pat Eddery | Mick Lambert | 1:06.13 |
| 1984 | Provideo | Tony Ives | Bill O'Gorman | 1:04.19 |
| 1985 | Running Edge | Pat Eddery | Mick Lambert | 1:03.17 |
| 1986 | Bluemede | Kevin Darley | Mel Brittain | 1:08.49 |
| 1987 | Great Chaddington | John Carroll | Jack Berry | 1:06.59 |
| 1988 | Denham Green | J H Brown | S J Muldoon | 1:07.98 |
| 1989 | Red Henry | Tony Ives | Bill O'Gorman | 1:03.43 |
| 1990 | Itsagame | Paul Eddery | Simon Dow | 1:02.14 |
| 1991 | Sylvan Sabre | John Williams | Pat Mitchell | 1:03.88 |
| 1992 | Touch Silver | Darryll Holland | Barry Hills | 1:03.38 |
| 1993 | Bandon Castle | David Harrison | Brian Rothwell | 1:00.53 |
| 1994 | Mind Games | John Carroll | Jack Berry | 1:02.28 |
| 1995 | World Premier | Mark Rimmer | Clive Brittain | 1:03.49 |
| 1996 | Indian Spark | Tim Sprake | Bill Turner | 1:02.03 |
| 1997 | Blueridge Dancer | Michael Tebbutt | Brian Meehan | 1:01.65 |
| 1998 | Charlene Lacy | Fergus Sweeney | Alan Jarvis | 1:04.31 |
| 1999 | Seraphina | George Duffield | Bryan McMahon | 1:02.00 |
| 2000 | Nearly A Fool | Kevin Darley | Bryan McMahon | 1:00.55 |
| 2001 | Shuffling Kid | Richard Quinn | Bryan McMahon | 1:05.13 |
| 2002 | The Lord | Alan Daly | Bill Turner | 1:05.81 |
| 2003 | Red Power | Robbie FitzPatrick | Paul Blockley | 1:02.87 |
| 2004 | Next Time Around | Robert Winston | Linda Stubbs | 1:01.57 |
| 2005 | Phantom Whisper | Alan Munro | Rod Millman | 1:02.10 |
| 2006 (Note: The 2006 running took place at Redcar) | Spoof Master | Robert Miles | Bill Turner | 1:03.68 |
| 2007 (Note: The 2007 running took place at Newcastle.) | Mister Hardy | Paul Hanagan | Richard Fahey | 1:04.99 |
| 2008 | Sally's Dilemma | Tolley Dean | Bill Turner | 1:02.66 |
| 2009 | Hearts of Fire | Paul Eddery | Pat Eddery | 0:59.71 |
| 2010 | Chiswick Bey | Paul Hanagan | Richard Fahey | 1:04.35 |
| 2011 | He's So Cool | Kieren Fox | Bill Turner | 1:01.70 |
| 2012 | My Boy Bill | Paddy Aspell | Mick Easterby | 1:00.14 |
| 2013 | Mick's Yer Man (Note: Mick's Yer Man was later exported to Hong Kong and renamed Always Win) | Ryan While | Bill Turner | 1:03.78 |
| 2014 | Cock of the North | Matthew Hopkins | Scott Dixon | 1:01.84 |
| 2015 | Ravenhoe | Silvestre De Sousa | Mark Johnston | 1:02.70 |
| 2016 | The Last Lion | Franny Norton | Mark Johnston | 1:04.90 |
| 2017 (1) | Santry | Neil Farley | Declan Carroll | 1:01.09 |
| 2017 (2) | Requinto Dawn | Tony Hamilton | Richard Fahey | 1:01.31 |
| 2018 | Izzer | Charles Bishop | Mick Channon | 1:04.64 |
| 2019 | Show Me Show Me | Paul Hanagan | Richard Fahey | 1:00.35 |
| | no race 2020 (Note: The 2020 running was cancelled because of the COVID-19 pandemic in the United Kingdom) |
| 2021 | Chipotle | Charles Bishop | Eve Johnson Houghton | 1:01.34 |
| 2022 | Persian Force | Rossa Ryan | Richard Hannon Jr. | 0:59.50 |
| 2023 | Doddie's Impact | Billy Loughnane | Robyn Brisland | 1:05.90 |
| 2024 | Zminiature | Rhys Clutterbuck | Dylan Cunha | 1:05.57 |
| 2025 | Norman's Cay | David Egan | Richard Hannon Jr. | 1:01.72 |
| 2026 | A Bear Affair | Sean Levey | Richard Hannon Jr. | 1:02.14 |

== See also ==
- Horse racing in Great Britain
- List of British flat horse races
