= Dragon Stakes =

Flat horse race in Britain

Dragon Stakes
2026
Bint Archange	A Bear Affair	Miss Lizzy

Previous years
2025
Staya	Military Code	Killavia
2024
Aesterius	It Ain't Two	The Actor
2023
Kylian	Hackman	Nazalan
2022
Rocket Rodney	Cuban Mistress	Eddie's Boy
2021
Fearby	Mojomaker	Kaboo

2020-2011
2020
Gussy Mac	Significantly	Internationaldream
2019
Liberty Beach	Dream Shot	Rayong
2018
Well Done Fox	Life of Riley	Chapelli
2017
Havana Grey	Roussel	To Wafij
2016
The Last Lion	Smokey Lane	Just An Idea
2015
Riflescope	Ejaazah	Soapy Aitken
2014
Beacon	Mukhmal	Snap Shots
2013
Ambiance	Langavat	Majestic Alexander
2012
Morawij	Lasilia	Botanic Garden
2011
Forevertheoptimist	Kohala	Bear Behind

2010-2001
2010
Zebedee	The Thrill Is Gone	Jamesway
2009
Iver Bridge Lad	Di Stefano	Angel's Pursuit
2008
Light The Fire	April Pride	Moss Likely
2007
Western Art	New Jersey	Miss Versatile
2006
Bahama Mama	Mood Music	Scented Present
2005
Zavone	Colourpoint	Smooch
2004
Polly Perkins	Southern Africa	Empire's Ghodha
2003
Fortunately	Prince of Denmark	Vienna's Boy
2002
Bella Tusa	Queen's Victory	Arran Pilot
2001
Berk The Jerk	Acclamation	Basbousate Nadia

2000-1992
2000
Misty Eyed	Triple Blue	Give Back Calais
1999
Vita Spericolata	Bandanna	Selking
1998
Sarson	Saphire	Atlantic Destiny
1997
Bodyguard	Daunting Lady	Aurigny
1996
Vax Star	Compton Place	Dancing Drop
1995
Home Shopping	Anotheranniversary	Mubhij
1994
Hoh Magic	Loveyoumillions	Pearl Venture
1993
Elrafa Ah	Ya Malak	Great Deeds
1992
Marina Park	Joyofracing	Zuno Warrior

The Dragon Stakes is a Listed flat horse race in Great Britain open to horses aged two years only. It is run at Sandown Park over a distance of 5 furlongs and 10 yards (1,015 metres), and it is scheduled to take place each year in July.

The race was first run in 1992.

The best winner of the race has probably been Hoh Magic, who went on to win the Prix Morny.

== Records ==
Leading jockey (4 wins):

- Richard Quinn – Bodyguard (1997), Vita Spericolata (1999), Berk The Jerk (2001), Bella Tusa (2002)

Leading trainer (3 wins):

- Richard Hannon Sr. – Sarson (1998), Zavone (2005), Zebedee (2010)

== Winners ==
Year	Winner	Jockey	Trainer	Time
1992	Marina Park	Dean McKeown	Mark Johnston	1:02.77
1993	Elrafa Ah	Richard Hills	Harry Thomson Jones	1:01.34
1994	Hoh Magic	Michael Hills	Michael Bell	0:59.79
1995	Home Shopping	Jason Tate	Kevin McAuliffe	1:02.55
1996	Vax Star	Jason Weaver	John Spearing	1:00.65
1997	Bodyguard	Richard Quinn	Paul Cole	1:05.53
1998	Sarson	Dane O'Neill	Richard Hannon Sr.	1:05.71
1999	Vita Spericolata	Richard Quinn	John Wainwright	1:01.10
2000	Misty Eyed	Lee Newman	Nerys Dutfield	1:01.38
2001	Berk The Jerk (Note: The 2001 winner Berk The Jerk was later exported to Hong Kong and renamed Wishmaster)	Richard Quinn	Mark Tompkins	1:02.65
2002	Bella Tusa	Richard Quinn	Chris Wall	1:04.46
2003	Fortunately	Kieren Fallon	David Evans	1:02.75
2004	Polly Perkins	Jean-Pierre Guillambert	Nick Littmoden	1:05.00
2005	Zavone	Dane O'Neill	Richard Hannon Sr.	1:02.47
2006	Bahama Mama	Shane Kelly	Jeremy Noseda	1:01.94
2007	Western Art	Jimmy Fortune	Peter Chapple-Hyam	1:04.07
2008	Light The Fire	Jimmy Fortune	Brian Meehan	1:00.83
2009	Iver Bridge Lad	Marc Halford	John Ryan	1:02.95
2010	Zebedee	Richard Hughes	Richard Hannon Sr.	1:01.49
2011	Forevertheoptimist	Kieren Fallon	Linda Stubbs	1:02.06
2012	Morawij	Neil Callan	Roger Varian	1:02.75
2013	Ambiance	Martin Harley	Mick Channon	1:00.25
2014	Beacon	Richard Hughes	Richard Hannon Jr.	1:02.49
2015	Riflescope	James Doyle	Mark Johnston	1:00.35
2016	The Last Lion	Franny Norton	Mark Johnston	1:04.20
2017	Havana Grey	P. J. McDonald	Karl Burke	1:00.59
2018	Well Done Fox	Ryan Moore	Richard Hannon Jr.	1:00.66
2019	Liberty Beach	Jason Hart	John Quinn	1:00.52
2020	Gussy Mac	Jack Mitchell	Roger Teal	1:03.75
2021	Fearby	P. J. McDonald	Edward Bethell	1:02.16
2022	Rocket Rodney	Daniel Muscutt	George Scott	1:01.13
2023	Kylian	Ryan Moore	Karl Burke	1:01.48
2024	Aesterius	James Doyle	Archie Watson	1:01.93
2025	Staya	Callum Shepherd	George Scott	1:01.22
2026	Bint Archange	Ryan Moore	Richard Hughes	1:01.42

== See also ==
- Horse racing in Great Britain
- List of British flat horse races
