= Sirenia Stakes =

Flat horse race in Britain

- Class: Group 3
- Location: Kempton Park, Sunbury, England
- Race type: Flat / Thoroughbred
- Sponsor: Unibet
- Website: Kempton Park

Race information
- Distance: 6f (1,207 metres)
- Surface: Polytrack
- Track: Right-handed
- Qualification: Two-year-olds
- Weight: 9 st 1 lb Allowances; 3 lb for fillies Penalties; 5 lb for G1 / G2 winners 3 lb for G3 winners
- Purse: £70,000 (2022); 1st: £40,000

Sirenia Stakes
2026
Moonrise	Shimmering Sun	Social Symbol

Previous years
2025
Five Ways	Rogue Supremacy	Sirius
2024
Symbol Of Strength	Jouncy	Brian
2023
Starlust	Seven Questions	Array
2022
Mischief Magic	Believing	Malrescia
2021
Eve Lodge	Wings Of War	Hierarchy

2020-2011
2020
Mighty Gurkha	Cloudbridge	Mystery Smiles
2019
Streamline	Oh Purple Reign	Huraiz
2018
Kessaar	Junius Brutus	Fuente
2017
Invincible Army	Corinthia Knight	Lake Volta
2016
The Last Lion	Koropick	Unabated
2015
Rouleau	Dream Destination	Adventurous
2014
Burnt Sugar	Maftool	Home Of The Brave
2013
Brown Sugar	Figure Of Speech	Simple Magic
2012
Glass Office	Zanetto	Well Acquainted
2011
Shumoos	Vocational	Saigon

2010-2001
2010
Hooray	Reckless Reward	Signs In The Sand
2009
Love Lockdown	Iver Bridge Lad	Monsieur Chevalier
2008
Elnawin	Square Eddie	Weatherstaff
2007
Philario	Red Alert Day	Lady Aquitaine
2006
Dhanyata	La Neige	We'll Confer
2005
Prince of Light	Ann Summers Gold	Art Market
2004
Satchem	Council Member	Visionist
2003
Pastoral Pursuits	Diosypros Blue	Cartography
2002
Sir Edwin Landseer	Hurricane Alan	Membership
2001
Lipstick	Twilight Blues	Mr Toad

2000-1991
2000
Santolina	Proceed With Care	Triple Blue
1999
Primo Valentino	Seazun	Imperialist
1998
Atlantic Destiny	Pistachio	Crystal Charm
1997
Mijana	Tadwiga	Merlin's Ring
1996
Arethusa	Maserati Monk	Starborough
1995
Rambling Bear	Eastern Prophets	Defined Feature
1994
Art Of War	Loyalize	Downclose
1993
Watani	Majestic Eagle	Governor George
1992
Silver Wizard	Forest Wind	Liyakah
1991
Bletchley Park	Wesaam	Gold Desert

1990-1988
1990
Majlood	Shalford	Storm At Night
1989
Star Hill	Daawi	Between The Sticks
1988
Sharp Justice	Rasheek	Access Travel

The Sirenia Stakes is a Group 3 flat horse race in Great Britain open to two-year-old horses. It is run at Kempton Park over a distance of 6 furlongs (1,207 metres, and it is scheduled to take place each year in early September.

== History ==
The event is named after Sirenia, a successful filly foaled in 1895. Her victories included Kempton's Duke of York Stakes and Great Jubilee Handicap, and she was subsequently a leading broodmare.

Prior to 1967, the Sirenia Stakes was run as a nursery handicap. It was originally contested on turf, and for a period it was classed at Listed level. It was promoted to Group 3 status in 2003, and was switched to a newly opened all-weather track in 2006.

== Records ==
Leading jockey (6 wins):

- Pat Eddery – King's Park (1973), Grundy (1974), Adviser (1976), Northern Chimes (1984), Silver Wizard (1992), Art of War (1994)

Leading trainer (4 wins):

- Richard Hannon Sr. – Bletchley Park (1991), Arethusa (1996), Elnawin (2008), Brown Sugar (2013)

== Winners ==
Year	Winner	Jockey	Trainer	Time
	Turf before 2006
1967	Aunt Audrey (Note: Cease Fire finished 1st, but was disqualified for crossing and placed second.)	Wally Swinburn	Peter Payne-Gallwey	1:14.40
1968	Madlin	Lester Piggott	Jeremy Tree	1:19.80
1969	Farfalla	Tony Murray	Doug Smith	1:14.80
1970	Le Johnstan	Geoff Lewis	John Sutcliffe	1:14.60
1971	Tickled Pink	Duncan Keith	Paul Davey	1:03.10
1972	Ume	Tony Murray	Fulke Johnson Houghton	1:01.93
1973	King's Park	Pat Eddery	Peter Walwyn	1:14.98
1974	Grundy	Pat Eddery	Peter Walwyn	1:12.54
1975 (Note: The 1975 running took place at Sandown over 5 furlongs.)	Royal Boy	Bruce Raymond	Michael Jarvis	1:03.16
1976	Adviser	Pat Eddery	Peter Walwyn	1:12.94
1977	Swinging Sam	Frankie Durr	Robert Armstrong	1:16.14
1978	Go Skytrain	Geoff Lewis	Ron Smyth	1:11.83
1979	Pace Jean	Eric Eldin	Guy Harwood	1:11.45
1980	Cut Throat	Philip Waldron	Henry Candy	1:12.41
1981	Sandhurst Prince	Greville Starkey	Guy Harwood	1:11.32
1982	Orange Squash	Paddy Young	Ron Smyth	1:12.01
1983	Defecting Dancer	Lester Piggott	Henry Cecil	1:14.21
1984	Northern Chimes	Pat Eddery	Eric Eldin	1:13.65
1985	Bambolona	Lester Piggott	Ron Sheather	1:12.68
1986	Gayane	Steve Cauthen	Henry Cecil	1:12.48
1987	Rahy	Walter Swinburn	Michael Stoute	1:12.96
1988	Sharp Justice	Ray Cochrane	Mick Ryan	1:14.50
1989	Star Hill	John Williams	Bill Wightman	1:13.89
1990	Majlood	Walter Swinburn	Michael Stoute	1:12.28
1991	Bletchley Park	Richard Hills	Richard Hannon Sr.	1:12.28
1992	Silver Wizard	Pat Eddery	Geoff Lewis	1:13.17
1993	Watani	Richard Hills	Robert Armstrong	1:12.22
1994	Art of War	Pat Eddery	Roger Charlton	1:13.11
1995	Rambling Bear	Stephen Davies	Michael Blanshard	1:13.53
1996	Arethusa	Dane O'Neill	Richard Hannon Sr.	1:12.46
1997	Mijana	Gary Hind	John Gosden	1:11.74
1998	Atlantic Destiny	Darryll Holland	Mark Johnston	1:13.75
1999	Primo Valentino	Michael Roberts	Peter Harris	1:11.23
2000	Santolina	Jimmy Fortune	John Gosden	1:11.74
2001	Lipstick	Steve Drowne	Mick Channon	1:13.28
2002	Sir Edwin Landseer	Steve Drowne	Paul Cole	1:10.98
2003	Pastoral Pursuits	Steve Drowne	Hughie Morrison	1:10.97
2004	Satchem	Kieren Fallon	Clive Brittain	1:10.87
2005 (Note: The 2005 running took place at Newmarket.)	Prince of Light	Joe Fanning	Mark Johnston	1:13.47
	Polytrack after 2005
2006	Dhanyata	Jimmy Fortune	Brian Meehan	1:12.22
2007	Philario	Fergus Sweeney	Karl Burke	1:12.25
2008	Elnawin	Pat Dobbs	Richard Hannon Sr.	1:11.91
2009	Love Lockdown	Keagan Latham	Ger Lyons	1:12.96
2010	Hooray	Seb Sanders	Sir Mark Prescott	1:11.50
2011	Shumoos	Martin Dwyer	Brian Meehan	1:12.04
2012	Glass Office	Jim Crowley	David Simcock	1:11.71
2013	Brown Sugar	Pat Dobbs	Richard Hannon Sr.	1:11.78
2014	Burnt Sugar	Gérald Mossé	Richard Hannon Jr.	1:11.79
2015	Rouleau	William Buick	Charlie Appleby	1:13.51
2016	The Last Lion	Joe Fanning	Mark Johnston	1:12.70
2017	Invincible Army	Martin Harley	James Tate	1:11.02
2018	Kessaar	Kieran O'Neill	John Gosden	1:11.65
2019	Streamline	Hector Crouch	Clive Cox	1:11.94
2020	Mighty Gurkha	Adam McNamara	Archie Watson	1:12.17
2021	Eve Lodge	Jim Crowley	Charlie Fellowes	1:12.58
2022	Mischief Magic	Pat Dobbs	Charlie Appleby	1:12.87
2023	Starlust	Hector Crouch	Ralph Beckett	1:12.97
2024	Symbol Of Strength (Note: The 2024 winner Symbol Of Strength was later exported to Hong Kong.)	Tom Marquand	Adrian Keatley	1:12.03
2025	Five Ways	Jason Watson	Andrew Balding	1:12.61
2026	Moonrise	Oisin Murphy	Andrew Balding	1:12.00

== See also ==
- Horse racing in Great Britain
- List of British flat horse races
