= Cross Counter =

British-bred Thoroughbred racehorse

- Racing silks of Godolphin
- Sire: Teofilo
- Grandsire: Galileo
- Dam: Waitress
- Damsire: Kingmambo
- Sex: Gelding
- Foaled: 5 April 2015
- Country: United Kingdom
- Colour: Bay
- Breeder: Godolphin
- Owner: Godolphin
- Trainer: Charlie Appleby
- Record: 16: 6-2-3
- Earnings: £3,610,588

Major wins
- Gordon Stakes (2018); Melbourne Cup (2018); Dubai Gold Cup (2019)

Awards
- Australian Champion Stayer (2018/19)
- Last updated on 6 November 2018

Cross Counter (foaled 5 April 2015) is a Thoroughbred racehorse best known for winning the 2018 Melbourne Cup. After winning two minor races he was gelded before returning in the summer of 2018 to win two more races including the Gordon Stakes as well as finishing second in the Great Voltigeur Stakes and fourth in the King George V Stakes. In autumn he was sent to Australia and on 6 November he became the first British-trained horse to win the Melbourne Cup. In 2019 he won the Dubai Gold Cup and ran third in the Goodwood Cup. He failed to win in 2020 but finished third in the Ascot Gold Cup and the Henry II Stakes.

== Background ==
Cross Counter is a bay gelding with a large white star bred and owned by Sheikh Mohammed's Godolphin organisation. He was sent into training with Charlie Appleby in Newmarket, Suffolk.

He was from the seventh crop of foals sired by the Teofilo the undefeated European Champion Two-Year-Old of 2006. Teofilo's other European offspring have included Trading Leather, Pleascach and Parish Hall: he has also had great success in Australia where his major winners have included Happy Clapper, Humidor and Kermadec. Cross Counter's dam Waitress showed little ability on the track, failing to win in four races. As a descendant of the broodmare Rahaam she was closely related to Cassandra Go, Halfway to Heaven, Rhododendron and Magical.

== Racing career ==
=== 2017: two-year-old season ===
Cross Counter made his racecourse debut on 9 December when he started at odds of 7/2 for a minor race over eight and a half furlong on the synthetic Tapeta surface at Wolverhampton Racecourse. Ridden by Adam Kirby he recovered from a slow start to take the lead a furlong out and pulled away to win by two and a quarter lengths.

=== 2018: three-year-old season ===
Six weeks after his first appearance, with Kirby again in the saddle Cross Counter returned to Wolverhampton for a race over nine and a half furlongs. Starting the 4/9 favourite he took the lead in the last quarter mile and steadily increased his advantage to win "easily" by eight lengths. He was then gelded and was off the track for four and a half months.

Cross Counter returned for a minor event at Sandown Park on 7 June in which he was ridden by William Buick and finished second of the fourteen runners behind Elwazir. Two weeks later he was assigned top weight of 132 pounds for the King George V Stakes at Royal Ascot. He made steady progress in the straight without looking likely to win and came home fourth behind the Mark Johnston Baghdad. Over the same course and distance in July, the gelding started 13/8 favourite against six opponents for a handicap race in which he was partnered by Kirby. After being restrained at the rear of the field he moved forward to take the lead approaching the final furlong and won by two lengths.

At Goodwood Racecourse on 4 August Cross Counter was stepped up in class to contest the Group 3 Gordon Stakes, a race which often serves as a major trial for the St Leger over one and a half miles. The race attracted only four runners and Cross Counter was made the 7/4 second choice in the betting behind Dee Ex Bee, a colt who had finished second in the Epsom Derby. After taking the lead soon after the start he broke away from his rivals in the straight and came home four and a half lengths clear of Dee Ex Bee despite being eased down by Buick in the final strides. The winning time of 2:31.39 was reported to be a new track record. As a gelding, Cross Counter was ineligible to run in the St Leger and there was speculation that he would be sent to Australia to contest the Melbourne Cup. Charlie Appleby's assistant Alex Merriam said "he's improving all the time. He's a big raw horse and I think there is some more improvement to come. He's been gelded – he was a bit of a boy back in the day and Charlie thought it was the best thing to do".

Eighteen days later at York Racecourse the gelding started favourite for the Group 2 Great Voltigeur Stakes. He produced a sustained run in the last quarter mile but failed by a head to overhaul his stablemate Old Persian. After the race Appleby commented "The Melbourne Cup has always been the plan for Cross Counter and hopefully this will put an extra half-kilo on his back and get him into the race. I didn’t want to take him to Australia and run in a prep-race — not as a three-year-old. I want to run him off the plane".

==== Melbourne Cup ====
On 14 September Cross Counter was one of 27 British horses to enter quarantine preparatory to being flown to Australia for the prestigious Spring Carnival meeting. After arriving in Melbourne on 29 September and emerging from quarantine two weeks later the Godolphin contingent showed excellent form: Best Solution won the Caulfield Cup, while Benbatl won the Caulfield Stakes before running second to the great mare Winx in the Cox Plate.

In the Melbourne Cup over two miles at Flemington Racecourse on 6 November Cross Counter was assigned a weight of 51 kg (approximately 112 pounds or 8.0 stones) and was partnered by Kerrin McEvoy who had won the race previously on Brew and Almandin as well as having ridden several major winners for Godolphin in Europe. He started at odds of 8/1 in 24-runner field which included Best Solution, Cliffs of Moher, Yucatan (Herbert Power Stakes), Magic Circle (Chester Cup), Youngstar (Queensland Oaks), Marmelo (Prix Maurice de Nieuil), Muntahaa (Ebor Handicap) and Avilius (The Bart Cummings). The Cup had been won by horses from France, Ireland, Germany and Japan, but despite eight second-place finishes, no British-trained horse had ever won the world's most valuable and prestigious staying race.

After racing towards the rear of the field for most of the way Cross Counter began to make progress on the final turn but still had at least fifteen horses in front of him entering the last 400 metres. Prince of Arran went to the front 200 metres out but was headed by Marmelo who looked the likely winner before Cross Counter came with a strong late run on the outside to win by a length. Prince of Arran was two lengths back in third to complete a 1-2-3 for British-trained horses. Appleby said "You can’t realise the delight of winning this race. It is known around the world as a seriously great race and to think we can bring it home to England is incredible. We have been trying very hard, but finally we have cracked it... He is a wonderful young horse".

The result of the race, following the success of Rekindling in 2017 led to questions about the weights assigned to Northern-hemisphere three-year-olds with Racing Victoria's senior handicapper Greg Carpenter saying "the way in which we integrate them into the handicap will be reviewed and evolve".

In the 2018 World's Best Racehorse Rankings Cross Counter was given a rating of 117, making him the 118th best horse in the world and the sixth-best horse over extended distances.

=== 2019: four-year-old season ===
Cross Counter made his first appearance of 2019 in the Dubai Gold Cup over 3200 metres at Meydan Racecourse on 30 March. Ridden by Buick he started the 7/4 favourite with the best fancied of his nine opponents being his stablemate Ispolini (Nad Al Sheba Trophy) and the Prix du Cadran winner Call The Wind. Cross Counter raced just behind the leaders before taking the lead 300 metres from the finish and won "comfortably" by a length and a quarter from Ispolini. Appleby commented "It was a tough ask to go to Australia as a 3-year-old and win the Melbourne Cup. It's always in the back of your mind whether it took a bit out of him, and this was our first opportunity to run him since then. He's answered all the questions we needed to know".

On his first start in Europe for almost ten months Cross Counter started the 4/1 third choice in the betting for the two and a half mile Ascot Gold Cup on 20 June. After being restrained towards the rear of the eleven runner field he stayed on well on the outside in the straight but was unable to get to the front and came home fourth behind Stradivarius, Dee Ex Bee and Master of Reality, beaten just under two lengths by the winner. He started 3/1 second favourite for the Goodwood Cup on 30 July but after briefly taking the lead a furlong out he was overtaken in the closing stages and finished third behind Stradivarius and Dee Ex Bee. On his final European start of the year the gelding was sent to Ireland and started 4/6 favourite for the Irish St. Leger at the Curragh. He raced in mid-division before making steady progress in the last quarter mile but never looked likely to win and finished fourth behind the three-year-old filly Search For A Song.

On 5 November Cross Counter carried top weight of 57.5 kg as he attempted to repeat his 2018 victory in the Melbourne Cup. With Buick in the saddle he kept on well in the last 400 metres and although he came home eighth of the twenty-four runners he finished less than two lengths behind the winner Vow And Declare.

=== 2020: five-year-old season ===
For his first run of 2020 Cross Counter was sent to Saudi Arabia for the Longines Turf Handicap over 3000 metres at King Abdulaziz Racetrack, Riyadh on 26 February. Ridden by Doyle, he started the 11/8 favourite but came home fifth of the fourteen runners behind Call The Wind after fading in the last 300 metres. On his return to Europe the gelding ran for the second time in the Ascot Gold Cup in June and finished third behind Stradivarius and Nayef Road, beaten eighteen lengths by the winner. On 5 July at Sandown Cross Counter started the 11/8 favourite for the Henry II Stakes, a race which had been rescheduled from its usual May date owing to the COVID-19 pandemic, and finished third behind the four-year-olds Dashing Willoughby and Spanish Mission.

== Pedigree ==
Pedigree of Cross Counter (IRE), bay gelding, 2015
Sire Teofilo (IRE) 2004	Galileo; 1998	Sadler's Wells	Northern Dancer
Sire Teofilo (IRE) 2004	Galileo; 1998	Sadler's Wells	Fairy Bridge
Sire Teofilo (IRE) 2004	Galileo; 1998	Urban Sea	Miswaki
Sire Teofilo (IRE) 2004	Galileo; 1998	Urban Sea	Allegretta
Sire Teofilo (IRE) 2004	Speirbhean; 1998	Danehill	Danzig
Sire Teofilo (IRE) 2004	Speirbhean; 1998	Danehill	Razyana
Sire Teofilo (IRE) 2004	Speirbhean; 1998	Saviour	Majestic Light
Sire Teofilo (IRE) 2004	Speirbhean; 1998	Saviour	Victorian Queen
Dam Waitress (USA) 2008	Kingmambo; 1990	Mr. Prospector	Raise a Native
Dam Waitress (USA) 2008	Kingmambo; 1990	Mr. Prospector	Gold Digger
Dam Waitress (USA) 2008	Kingmambo; 1990	Miesque	Nureyev
Dam Waitress (USA) 2008	Kingmambo; 1990	Miesque	Pasadoble
Dam Waitress (USA) 2008	Do The Honours (IRE); 1998	Highest Honor	Kenmare
Dam Waitress (USA) 2008	Do The Honours (IRE); 1998	Highest Honor	High River
Dam Waitress (USA) 2008	Do The Honours (IRE); 1998	Persian Secret	Persian Heights
Dam Waitress (USA) 2008	Do The Honours (IRE); 1998	Persian Secret	Rahaam (Family: 3-d)

== See also ==
- List of Melbourne Cup winners
