= The Last Lion (horse) =

Irish-bred Thoroughbred racehorse

- Racing silks of John Brown
- Sire: Choisir
- Grandsire: Danehill Dancer
- Dam: Mala Mala
- Damsire: Brief Truce
- Sex: Gelding
- Foaled: 12 February 2014
- Died: 26 March 2022 (aged 8)
- Country: Ireland
- Colour: Bay
- Breeder: Barronstown Stud & Mrs T Stack
- Owner: John Brown & Megan Dennis
- Trainer: Mark Johnston
- Record: 14: 4-4-3
- Earnings: £229,280

Major wins
- Brocklesby Stakes (2016); Dragon Stakes (2016); Sirenia Stakes (2016); Middle Park Stakes (2016)

The Last Lion (12 February 2014 – 26 March 2022) was an Irish-bred, British-trained Thoroughbred racehorse and sire. Racing only as a two-year-old in 2016, he was one of the most successful juveniles of his generation in Britain, winning the Brocklesby Stakes, Dragon Stakes and Sirenia Stakes before recording an upset victory in the Group One Middle Park Stakes. In all, he had four wins, four seconds and two third places from ten starts. At the end of the year he was sold and retired from racing to become a breeding stallion in Ireland. He returned to racing in 2021 after suffering from fertility issues, and was fatally injured while racing in March 2022.

== Background ==
The Last Lion was a light-coloured bay horse standing 15.3½ hands high (1.61 metres), with a narrow white blaze and white socks on his hind legs. He was bred in Ireland by Barronstown Stud & Mrs T Stack. As a yearling in September 2015 The Last Lion was consigned by the Glenvale Stud to the Goffs Orby sale and was bought for 82,000 euros by the trainer Mark Johnston. He entered the ownership of John Brown & Megan Dennis and was taken into training with Johnston at Middleham, North Yorkshire.

He was sired by Choisir, an Australian-bred sprinter who won the Golden Jubilee Stakes and the King's Stand Stakes at Royal Ascot in 2003. As a breeding stallion he has made a considerable impact, siring major winners including Olympic Glory, Starspangledbanner and Obviously. The Last Lion's dam Mala Mala (a half-sister to Tarascon) won only one minor races but finished third in both the Moyglare Stud Stakes and the Cheveley Park Stakes. She was descended from the Irish broodmare Ballisland (foaled in 1946) who was the female-line ancestor of several other major winners including Al Hareb, Muhaarar and Relkino.

== Racing career ==
=== 2016: two-year-old season ===
==== Spring ====
On his racecourse debut The Last Lion started the 4/5 favourite in a ten-runner field for the Brocklesby Stakes over five furlongs at Doncaster Racecourse on 2 April. Ridden by Franny Norton he took the lead before half way, went clear of his opponents a furlong out before being eased down in the closing stages to win by one and three quarter lengths from the filly Simmy's Temple.

At the end of the month the colt started 8/15 favourite for a minor race over the same distance at Ascot Racecourse. The Wesley Ward-trained filly Create A Dream led from the start and although The Last Lion made steady progress he failed by a neck to overhaul the American challenger with Deningy a short head back in third. He was relegated to third when a stewards' inquiry found that he had hampered Deningy when hanging left a furlong from the finish. Joe Fanning took over from Norton when The Last Lion contested a five furlong race at Beverley Racecourse on 28 May and finished second of the six runners behind Prince of Lir.

==== Summer ====
At Royal Ascot on 16 June The Last Lion was stepped up in class for the Group Two Norfolk Stakes and started a 20/1 outsider. After tracking the leaders he took the lead in the last quarter mile but was overtaken in the final furlong and beaten half a length by Prince of Lir. Norton was back in the saddle when the colt was dropped to Listed class for the five-furlong Dragon Stakes at Sandown Park Racecourse in 1 July. He was made the 10/11 favourite, with the best fancied of his six opponents being the Roger Varian-trained Pretty Vacant. The Last Lion took the lead two furlongs out, broke clear of his rivals and was never in danger of defeat, winning by two lengths from Smokey Lane.

In the Molecomb Stakes at Goodwood Racecourse on 27 July he was beaten three lengths by his less-fancied stablemate Yalta, with the favourite Global Applause in third place. On his next appearance the colt was stepped up distance and started a 14/1 outsider for the Gimcrack Stakes over six furlongs at York Racecourse. After racing in second place he challenged for the lead two furlongs from the finish but was unable to quicken and finished third of the ten runners behind Blue Point and Mokarris.

==== Autumn ====
Joe Fanning rode the colt in his last three races. Two weeks after his run in the Gimcrack, The Last Lion started second favourite for the Group Three Sirenia Stakes over six furlongs on the synthetic Polytrack surface at Kempton Park Racecourse. He raced in second behind the pace-setting Queensbrydge before taking the lead approaching the final furlong. He accelerated clear and won "readily" by four length from the favorite Koropick. The colt was back on the track six days later for the Group Two Flying Childers Stakes at Doncaster. The Prix Robert Papin winner Tis Marvellous headed the betting with The Last Lion on 11/2 in an eleven-runner field which also included Yalta, Prince of Lir and the Windsor Castle Stakes winner Ardad. Fanning tracked the leaders before sending his month into the lead approaching the final furlong. He was overtaken by Ardad in the final strides and was beaten three quarters of a length into a dead-heat for second place alongside Legendary Lunch.

On his final appearance of the year, The Last Lion was stepped up to Group One class for the first time and started a 25/1 outsider for the Middle Park Stakes over six furlongs at Newmarket Racecourse on 24 September. Blue Point started 11/10 favourite whilst the other eight runners included Mehmas (July Stakes, Richmond Stakes), Mokarris and Koropick as well as the Irish challengers Peace Envoy (Anglesey Stakes), Intelligence Cross (Round Tower Stakes) and Medicine Jack (Railway Stakes). The Last Lion led from the start and despite coming under pressure in the final furlong he "battled on gamely" to win by three quarters of a length from Blue Point, with Mehmas two and quarter lengths back in third place. After winning his first Group One at the age of 46, Joe Fanning said "He is a good horse. He has been tough all year. His owner said if he finished fifth he would be delighted with him. His work early on was brilliant in soft ground and he won on soft in the Brocklesby. I thought it might be against him today, but it didn't seem to bother him. He is a very laid-back horse and very versatile, very tough". Mark Johnston commented "He's a fantastic horse, and it's a fairy story right from the beginning because many years ago we had Mister Monet here for the Champion Stakes and he broke his leg and didn't make it. When I saw this horse at Goffs from the same family I phoned John Brown and said, 'You've got to have this one'".

== Assessment ==
In the official European Classification of two-year-olds for 2016 The Last Lion was given a rating of 116, making him the fifth best juvenile colt of the season, six pounds behind the top-rated Churchill.

== Stud record ==
It was announced in October that The Last Lion had been bought for an undisclosed sum by Sheikh Mohammed's Godolphin. He was immediately retired from racing to become a breeding stallion. Johnston commented "He will surely go down in history as one of the best and toughest horses I ever trained. He is the type of horse that every owner and trainers dreams of. He truly is a lion of a horse but I hope he is not the last. I am looking forward to training his progeny and I dearly hope there are many just like him".

He was based at the Kildangan Stud in County Kildare with his stud fee for 2017 being set at 12,000 euros.

== Racing career resumed ==
=== 2021: seven-year-old season ===
The Last Lion suffered from fertility problems and made no impact as a breeding stallion. After being gelded he returned to racing as a seven-year-old in 2021. He was unsuccessful in his first three races, and was euthanized after fracturing a pastern during a race at Kempton Park on 26 March 2022.

== Pedigree ==
Pedigree of The Last Lion (IRE), bay gelding, 2014
Sire Choisir (AUS) 1999	Danehill Dancer (IRE); 1993	Danehill	Danzig
Sire Choisir (AUS) 1999	Danehill Dancer (IRE); 1993	Danehill	Razyana
Sire Choisir (AUS) 1999	Danehill Dancer (IRE); 1993	Mira Adonde	Sharpen Up
Sire Choisir (AUS) 1999	Danehill Dancer (IRE); 1993	Mira Adonde	Lettre d'Amore
Sire Choisir (AUS) 1999	Great Selection (AUS); 1990	Lunchtime	Silly Season
Sire Choisir (AUS) 1999	Great Selection (AUS); 1990	Lunchtime	Great Occasion
Sire Choisir (AUS) 1999	Great Selection (AUS); 1990	Pensieve Mood	Biscay
Sire Choisir (AUS) 1999	Great Selection (AUS); 1990	Pensieve Mood	Staid
Dam Mala Mala (IRE) 1998	Brief Truce (USA); 1989	Irish River	Riverman
Dam Mala Mala (IRE) 1998	Brief Truce (USA); 1989	Irish River	Irish Star
Dam Mala Mala (IRE) 1998	Brief Truce (USA); 1989	Falafel	Northern Dancer
Dam Mala Mala (IRE) 1998	Brief Truce (USA); 1989	Falafel	Queen's Statute
Dam Mala Mala (IRE) 1998	Breyani (IRE); 1987	Commanche Run	Run the Gantlet
Dam Mala Mala (IRE) 1998	Breyani (IRE); 1987	Commanche Run	Volley
Dam Mala Mala (IRE) 1998	Breyani (IRE); 1987	Molokai	Prince Tenderfoot
Dam Mala Mala (IRE) 1998	Breyani (IRE); 1987	Molokai	Cake (Family 13-e)
