= Levmoss =

Irish Thoroughbred racehorse

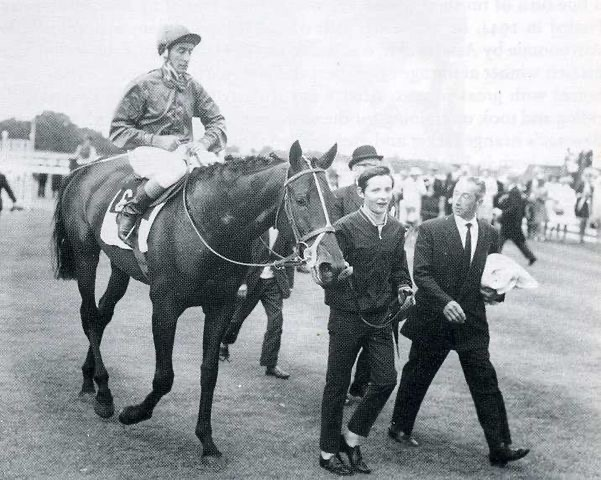
- Levmoss and Bill Williamson return after winning the Gold Cup at Royal Ascot in 1969
- Sire: Le Levanstell
- Grandsire: Le Lavandou
- Dam: Feemoss
- Damsire: Ballymoss
- Sex: Stallion
- Foaled: 1965
- Country: Ireland
- Colour: Bay
- Breeder: McGrath Trust Company
- Owner: Seamus McGrath
- Trainer: Seamus McGrath
- Record: 13:8-0-2
- Earnings: £142,226

Major wins
- Oxfordshire Stakes (1968); Prix du Cadran (1969); Ascot Gold Cup (1969); Prix de l'Arc de Triomphe (1969)

Awards
- Timeform Horse of the Year (1969); Timeform rating 133
- Last updated on September 27, 2008

Levmoss (1965–1977) was an Irish Thoroughbred racehorse whose career lasted from 1967 to 1969. He was the leading stayer in Europe in 1969, when he won the premier long-distance races in England (Ascot Gold Cup) and France (Prix du Cadran). In October of that year he moved down to middle distances to win Europe's most prestigious weight-for-age race, the Prix de l'Arc de Triomphe.

== Background ==
Levmoss was a bay horse bred in Ireland by the McGrath Trust Company, a family breeding organisation headed by Joseph McGrath. His sire was the McGrath-owned Le Levanstell, who won the Sussex Stakes and the Queen Elizabeth II Stakes in 1961 before a successful stud career. Levmoss's dam, Feemoss came from a strong staying family, being a daughter of the Yorkshire Oaks winner Feevagh and a half-sister of the Queen Alexandra Stakes winner Laurence O. After, Levmoss, Feemoss went on to produce the Prix de Diane winner Sweet Mimosa and the champion stayer Le Moss.

== Racing career ==
=== Early career ===
Levmoss ran twice as a two-year-old winning once at Gowran Park. At three he developed into a useful stayer. After winning a race at the Phoenix Park Racecourse he was sent to England where he finished fourth in the Lingfield Derby Trial. A month later he finished fourth in the Queen's Vase at Royal Ascot before returning to England for the third time where he produced his best performance of the year when winning the Oxfordshire Stakes at Newbury Racecourse, beating the St Leger Stakes runner-up Canterbury and the leading filly Park Top. That Autumn he finished third in the Prix Royal Oak (French St Leger) and ended the year by winning the Leopardstown November Handicap over two miles carrying top weight of 130 pounds.

=== 1969: four-year-old season ===
Levmoss began his four-year-old season by running unplaced in the Gladness Stakes and was then sent to France where he finished third behind Zamazaan in the Prix Jean Prat over 3100m at Longchamp Racecourse. He returned to Longchamp the following month and recorded his most important victory up to that time as he beat Zamazaan into third place in the 4000m Prix du Cadran. Having won the most important French staying race, Levmoss was then sent to Royal Ascot to contest the English equivalent, the Ascot Gold Cup. He started 15/8 favourite and won easily by four lengths from Torpid.

Levmoss returned to Ireland in September to win the Leinster Handicap at the Curragh by three lengths, carrying a weight of 150 pounds (10st 10lbs). In October, Levmoss was dropped back in distance for the Prix de l'Arc de Triomphe over 2400m at Longchamp. His opponents included Park Top, Blakeney, Prince Regent (Irish Derby) and Crepellana (Prix de Diane). As he was considered a specialist stayer, Levmoss was not considered a serious contender and started a 52/1 outsider. Ridden by the Australian Bill Williamson, Levmoss was prominent throughout before moving to the front turning into the straight and galloping on strongly all the way to the line, to win by three quarters of a length from Park Top.

== Assessment ==
In their book "A Century of Champions", based on the Timeform rating system, John Randall and Tony Morris rated Levmoss a "superior" Arc winner and the ninth best Irish racehorse of the 20th century.

== Stud record ==
Levmoss went to stud as a five-year-old after accumulating eight wins worth £142,226. He stood for most of his life in Ireland, where he had been trained by Seamus McGrath, but moved to France for the 1977 season and died on 1 October 1977. The Irish St. Leger winner M-Lolshan, Prix du Cadran winner Shafaraz and Musidora Stakes winner Moonlight Night were his best winners. He was also the damsire of Ardross.

== Sire line tree ==
- Levmoss
  - Moss Trooper
    - King Aussie
  - Nuthatch
  - Shantallah
    - Salt Lake
  - Shafaraz
  - M-Lolshan
  - Curioso

== Pedigree ==
Pedigree of Levmoss (IRE), bay stallion 1965
Sire Le Levanstell	Le Lavandou	Djebel	Tourbillon
Sire Le Levanstell	Le Lavandou	Djebel	Loika
Sire Le Levanstell	Le Lavandou	Lavande	Rustom Pasha
Sire Le Levanstell	Le Lavandou	Lavande	Livadia
Sire Le Levanstell	Stella's Sister	Ballyogan	Fair Trial
Sire Le Levanstell	Stella's Sister	Ballyogan	Serial
Sire Le Levanstell	Stella's Sister	My Aid	Knight of the Garter
Sire Le Levanstell	Stella's Sister	My Aid	Flying Aid
Dam Feemoss	Ballymoss	Mossborough	Nearco
Dam Feemoss	Ballymoss	Mossborough	All Moonshine
Dam Feemoss	Ballymoss	Indian Call	Singapore
Dam Feemoss	Ballymoss	Indian Call	Flittemere
Dam Feemoss	Feevagh	Solar Slipper	Windsor Slipper
Dam Feemoss	Feevagh	Solar Slipper	Solar Flower
Dam Feemoss	Feevagh	Astrid Wood	Bois Roussel
Dam Feemoss	Feevagh	Astrid Wood	Astrid (Family: 1-k)
