= 2018 Melbourne Cup =

Australian horse race

- Melbourne Cup
- Location: Flemington Racecourse; Melbourne, Australia
- Date: 6 November 2018
- Winning horse: Cross Counter
- Jockey: Kerrin McEvoy
- Trainer: Charlie Appleby (UAE)
- Surface: Grass
- Attendance: 83,471

300 to go, it's Finche, with A Prince of Aaran on the outside, Rostropovich is running on and Marmelo back to the inside too. A Prince of Aaran at the 200, Marmelo wearing it down, Marmelo gets up on the inside and here comes Cross Counter. Cross Counter coming at Marmelo, Cross Counter's flying, the blue army have done it at last!

— Commentator Matt Hill describes the climax of the race

The 2018 Melbourne Cup (known commercially as 2018 Lexus Melbourne Cup) was the 158th running of the Melbourne Cup, a prestigious Australian Thoroughbred horse race. The race was run over 3,200 metres (1.988 mi) on 6 November 2018 at Flemington Racecourse in Melbourne.

Lexus commenced a five-year naming rights sponsorship deal, taking over from Emirates. It was the last Melbourne Cup broadcast by the Seven Network before Network Ten takes over in 2019.

The race was won by Cross Counter, ridden by Kerrin McEvoy and trained by Charlie Appleby.

== Field ==
Number	Horse	Trainer	Jockey	Barrier	Placing
1	Best Solution	Saeed bin Suroor (UAE)	Pat Cosgrave	6	8th
2	The Cliffsofmoher	Aidan O'Brien (Ireland)	Ryan Moore	9	Did not Finish
3	Magic Circle	Ian Williams (Great Britain)	Corey Brown	17	16th
4	Chestnut Coat	Yoshito Yahagi (Japan)	Yuga Kawada	4	14th
5	Muntahaa	John Gosden (Great Britain)	Jim Crowley	13	9th
6	Sound Check	Michael Moroney	Jordan Childs	16	18th
7	Who Shot Thebarman	Chris Waller	Ben Melham	18	17th
8	Ace High	David Payne	Tye Angland	22	20th
9	Marmelo	Hughie Morrison (Great Britain)	Hugh Bowman	10	2nd
10	Avilius	James Cummings	Glyn Schofield	11	22nd
11	Yucatán	Aidan O'Brien (Ireland)	James McDonald	23	11th
12	Auvray	Richard Freedman	Tommy Berry	1	21st
13	Finche	Chris Waller	Zac Purton	15	4th
14	Red Cardinal	Darren Weir	Damien Oliver	5	23rd
15	Vengeur Masque	Michael Moroney	Patrick Moloney	2	15th
16	Ventura Storm	David Hayes	Mark Zahra	7	10th
17	Prince of Arran	Charlie Fellowes (Great Britain)	Michael Walker	20	3rd
18	Nakeeta	Iain Jardine (Great Britain)	Regan Bayliss	3	12th
19	Sir Charles Road	Lance O'Sullivan (New Zealand)	Dwayne Dunn	14	7th
20	Zacada	Murray Baker (New Zealand)	Damian Lane	24	13th
21	Runaway	Gai Waterhouse	Stephen Baster	12	19th
22	Youngstar	Chris Waller	Craig Williams	8	6th
23	Cross Counter	Charlie Appleby (UAE)	Kerrin McEvoy	19	1st
24	Rostropovich	Aidan O'Brien (Ireland)	Wayne Lordan	21	5th

== Fatality ==
Irish colt The CliffsofMoher was euthanised after he suffered a fractured right shoulder.

== Horse naming ==
Overseas horses may be forced to be raced under a different name if horses with the same name are raced in Australia. Sound Check was renamed as Sound, Cliffs of Moher renamed as The CliffsofMoher and Prince of Arran as A Prince of Arran (raced as Prince of Arran on 2019 and 2020 Melbourne Cup). Sound Check was permitted to be raced with its original name in the Melbourne Cup.

== Penalties ==
After the races, 6 jockeys were fined.

Hugh Bowman was cited on three separate charges in the $7.3 million race - an incident of careless riding at the 500m, excessive whip use prior to the final 100m and the fact that he weighed in more than half a kilogram over his prescribed weight of 55 kg aboard runner-up Marmelo.

Kerrin McEvoy was fined $3000 after using the whip nine times - four more than what is permitted under the rules - on Cross Counter in the final 400m of the race.

Jim Crowley and Christine Puls were also suspended for careless riding on the undercard at Flemington.
