= Gillies Fillies' Stakes =

Flat horse race in Britain

- Class: Listed
- Location: Doncaster Racecourse; Doncaster, England
- Race type: Flat / Thoroughbred
- Sponsor: VirginBet
- Website: www.doncaster-racecourse.co.uk

Race information
- Distance: 1m 2f 43y (2,051 metres)
- Surface: Turf
- Track: Left-handed
- Qualification: Three-years-old and up fillies and mares exc G1 winners after 31 March
- Weight: 9 st 1 lb (3yo); 9 st 4 lb (4yo+); Penalties; 7 lb for Group 2 winners * 5 lb for Group 3 winners* 3 lb for Listed winners * * after 31 March
- Purse: £60,000 (2025); 1st: £34,026

Gillies Fillies' Stakes
2026
Seren Star	Wadooda	Felicitas

Previous years
2025
Danielle	Elwateen	Bosphorus Rose
2024
Estrange	Danielle	Invisible Friend
2023
Mukaddamah	Sound Angela	Ermesinde
2022
Something Enticing	Precisely	Sweet Believer
2021
Vesela	Something Enticing	Lady Hayes

2020-2011
2020
Chamade	Trefoil	Ice Sprite
2019
Scentasia	Velma Valento	Ojooba
2018
Company Asset	Shenanigans	Bona Fide
2017
Star Rock	Vintage Folly	Melesina
2016
Carnachy	Dubai Fashion	Lady Of Camelot
2015
Princess Loulou	Latenightrequest	Imshivalla
2014
Lady Tiana	Princess Loulou	Merry Me
2013
Miss Cap Estel	Cocktail Queen	Cushion
2012
Cubanita	Sajjhaa	Reckoning
2011
Mirror Lake	Principal Role	Ceilidh House

2010-2003
2010
Ceilidh House	Zahoo	Saphira's Fire
2009
Queen Of Pentacles	Mooakada	Copperbeech
2008
Les Fazzani	Classic Remark	Kahara
2007
Gower Song	Lake Toya	Sudoor
2006
Lake Toya	Mango Mischief	Under The Rainbow
2005
Strawberry Dale	Whazzat	Royal Alchemist
2004
Mango Mischief	Star of Normandie	Autumn Wealth
2003
Al Ihtithar	Russian Society	Felicity

The Gillies Fillies' Stakes is a Listed flat horse race in Great Britain open to fillies and mares aged three years or older. It is run at Doncaster, over a distance of 1 mile, 2 furlongs and 43 yards (2,051 metres), and it is scheduled to take place each year in November.

The race was first run in 2003.

== Winners ==
Year	Winner	Age	Jockey	Trainer	Time
2003	Al Ihtithar	3	Richard Hills	Barry Hills	2:08.86
2004	Mango Mischief	3	Dane O'Neill	John Dunlop	2:18.16
2005	Strawberry Dale	3	Jamie Spencer	James Bethell	2:19.47
2006 (Note: The 2006 running was held at Windsor)	Lake Toya	4	Richard Hills	Saeed bin Suroor	2:09.30
2007	Gower Song	4	Richard Quinn	David Elsworth	2:07.71
2008	Les Fazzani	4	Darryll Holland	Kevin Ryan	2:17.64
2009	Queen Of Pentacles	3	Richard Hughes	Jeremy Noseda	2:11.87
2010	Ceilidh House	3	Jim Crowley	Ralph Beckett	2:09.66
2011	Mirror Lake	4	Martin Dwyer	Amanda Perrett	2:13.31
2012	Cubanita	3	Jim Crowley	Ralph Beckett	2:10.40
2013	Miss Cap Estel	4	David Probert	Andrew Balding	2:19.43
2014	Lady Tiana	3	Graham Lee	Lucy Wadham	2:26.46
2015	Princess Loulou	5	Joe Fanning	Roger Varian	2:20.76
2016	Carnachy	4	Jamie Spencer	David Simcock	2:07.62
2017	Star Rock	3	P. J. McDonald	Hughie Morrison	2:14.25
2018	Company Asset	5	Kevin Stott	Kevin Ryan	2:15.49
2019 (Note: The 2019 running was held at Lingfield Park on an all-weather surface)	Scentasia	3	Frankie Dettori	John Gosden	2:03.73
2020	Chamade	3	Richard Kingscote	Ralph Beckett	2:13.46
2021	Veesla	3	Rob Hornby	Ralph Beckett	2:14.74
2022	Something Enticing	4	David Probert	Andrew Balding	2:17.91
2023	Mukaddamah	5	Jim Crowley	Roger Varian	2:09.13
2024	Estrange	3	James Doyle	David O'Meara	2:16.32
2025	Danielle	4	James Doyle	John & Thady Gosden	2:16.25
2026	Seren Star	4	Cieren Fallon	William Haggas	2:14.44

== See also ==
- Horse racing in Great Britain
- List of British flat horse races
