= Celestial Storm =

Thoroughbred racehorse trained in Britain

- Sire: Roberto
- Grandsire: Hail to Reason
- Dam: Tobira Celeste
- Damsire: Ribot
- Sex: Stallion
- Foaled: 18 April 1983
- Country: United States
- Colour: Bay
- Owner: Richard L. Duchossois
- Trainer: Luca Cumani
- Record: 8: 3-4-1

Major wins
- March Stakes (1986); Princess of Wales's Stakes (1987); Top-rated older horse in Europe, 11 furlongs plus (1987)

Awards
- Timeform rating: 131 (1986), 132 (1987)

Celestial Storm (18 April 1983–after 1 February 2000) was an American-bred, British-trained Thoroughbred racehorse and sire. Although he never won above Group Two level, he was rated among the ten best racehorses in Europe in both 1986 and 1987. As a three-year-old he won the March Stakes and finished second in both the St Leger Stakes and the Champion Stakes. His four-year-old was restricted to two races, a win in the Princess of Wales's Stakes and a second place behind Reference Point in the King George VI and Queen Elizabeth Stakes. Celestial Storm stood as a breeding stallion in the United Kingdom and Japan but had very little success as a sire of winners.

== Background ==
Celestial Storm was a bay horse with a white star and a white sock on his left hind foot, bred by the North Ridge Farm of Lexington, Kentucky. He was sired by Roberto, an American-bred horse who won Epsom Derby and the inaugural Benson and Hedges Gold Cup as a three-year-old in 1972. At stud, Roberto sired many important winners including Sunshine Forever, Real Shadai, At Talaq, Touching Wood, Lear Fan, Brian's Time, Kris S. and Dynaformer. Celestial Storm's dam Tobira Celeste, a daughter of Ribot, was a highly successful broodmare. Her daughter La Vague a l'Ame produced the Canadian International Stakes winner River Memories, whilst her 1990 foal Thawakib won the Ribblesdale Stakes and produced the Prix de l'Arc de Triomphe winner Sakhee. Another of Tobira Celeste's daughters was Reves Celestes, the grand-dam of Mastercraftsman.

The colt was owned throughout his racing career by the American businessman Richard L. Duchossois and was trained by Luca Cumani at the Bedford House stable in Newmarket. Celestial Storm usually raced in a sheepskin noseband.

== Racing career ==
=== 1986: three-year-old season ===
Celestial Storm was unraced as a two-year-old, having undergone surgery for "joint trouble". He began his racing career with a three length win in a maiden race at Newmarket Racecourse in July 1986. His next race was the Extel Handicap over ten furlongs at Goodwood Racecourse a race which Luca Cumani had won for three years in succession. Celestial Storm started the heavily backed favourite but finished third behind his stable companion Chinoiserie. On his next appearance, the colt finished second to Power Bender in a handicap race at Newmarket. Celestial Storm was then moved up in distance for the March Stakes over fourteen furlongs at Goodwood and won impressively from Sadeem and Fleeting Affair.

On 13 September Celestial Storm was one of eight three-year-olds to contest the 210th running of the St Leger at Doncaster Racecourse. Ridden by Steve Cauthen, he started at odds of 6/1 and finished second behind Moon Madness. On his final appearance of the season he was brought back in distance and matched against older horses in the Champion Stakes over ten furlongs at Newmarket on 18 October. Ridden by Ray Cochrane, Celestial Storm produced a strong late run to finish second, three-quarters of a length behind the four-year-old filly Triptych and four lengths clear of Park Express in third place. The result was only confirmed after the racecourse stewards failed to sustain an objection by Cochrane, who alleged that the winner had caused interference to the runner-up in the closing stages.

=== 1987: four-year-old season ===
Problems with the tendons in his right foreleg meant that Celestial Storm did not appear as a four-year-old until the July meeting at Newmarket where he started the 13/8 favourite for the Princess of Wales's stakes over one and a half miles. Ridden by Cochrane, he accelerated clear of the field in the closing stages to win by two and half lengths from Phardante in a course record time of 2:28.68. Eighteen days later, Celestial Storm ran in Britain's most prestigious weight-for-age race, the King George VI and Queen Elizabeth Stakes. He started at odds of 5/1 in a field of eight which included the Derby winner Reference Point, the Irish Derby winner Sir Harry Lewis, the German champion Acatenango, the Italian champion Tony Bin, and the Oaks winner Unite as well as Triptych and Moon Madness. Celestial Storm was never able to challenge Reference Point, who won by three lengths but was second best on the day, wearing down Triptych in the straight to take the runner-up's prize by a neck. Celestial Storm was then aimed at the Prix de l'Arc de Triomphe at Longchamp Racecourse in October, but was withdrawn after suffering a recurrence of his tendon injury.

== Assessment ==
In the official International Classification for 1986, Celestial Storm was rated the fifth-best three-year-old colt in Europe (behind Dancing Brave, Shahrastani, Bering and Last Tycoon) and the eighth-best horse of any age. The independent Timeform organisation gave him a rating of 131, making him the equal-sixth best horse in that year. In the following year, Celestial Storm was the highest-rated older horse in Europe over one and a half miles in the International Classification, and was the fifth-best horse of any age behind Reference Point, Mtoto, Trempolino and Miesque. Timeform rated him on 132, placing him fifth behind Reference Point, Trempolino, Mtoto and Triptych.

== Stud record ==
Celestial Storm was retired from racing to become a breeding stallion at the New England Stud at Newmarket, where he began his stud career at a fee of £5,000. He was later sold and exported to Japan. Celestial Storm was a very disappointing sire. The most successful of his offspring was probably Celestial Choir, a mare who won nineteen races including the Dipper Novices' Chase at Newcastle Racecourse in 1998. He was "put out of stud" in Japan on 1 February 2000.

== Pedigree ==
Pedigree of Celestial Storm (USA), bay horse, 1983
Sire Roberto (USA) 1969	Hail To Reason (USA); 1958	Turn-To	Royal Charger
Sire Roberto (USA) 1969	Hail To Reason (USA); 1958	Turn-To	Source Sucree
Sire Roberto (USA) 1969	Hail To Reason (USA); 1958	Nothirdchance	Blue Swords
Sire Roberto (USA) 1969	Hail To Reason (USA); 1958	Nothirdchance	Galla Colors
Sire Roberto (USA) 1969	Bramalea (USA); 1959	Nashua	Nasrullah
Sire Roberto (USA) 1969	Bramalea (USA); 1959	Nashua	Segula
Sire Roberto (USA) 1969	Bramalea (USA); 1959	Rarelea	Bull Lea
Sire Roberto (USA) 1969	Bramalea (USA); 1959	Rarelea	Bleebok
Dam Tobira Celeste (USA) 1971	Ribot (GB); 1952	Tenerani	Bellini
Dam Tobira Celeste (USA) 1971	Ribot (GB); 1952	Tenerani	Tofanella
Dam Tobira Celeste (USA) 1971	Ribot (GB); 1952	Romanella	El Greco
Dam Tobira Celeste (USA) 1971	Ribot (GB); 1952	Romanella	Barbara Burrini
Dam Tobira Celeste (USA) 1971	Heavenly Body (USA); 1957	Dark Star	Royal Gem
Dam Tobira Celeste (USA) 1971	Heavenly Body (USA); 1957	Dark Star	Isolde
Dam Tobira Celeste (USA) 1971	Heavenly Body (USA); 1957	Dangerous Dame	Nasrullah
Dam Tobira Celeste (USA) 1971	Heavenly Body (USA); 1957	Dangerous Dame	Lady Kells (Family 21-a)

- Celestial Storm was inbred 4 x 4 to Nasrullah, meaning that this stallion appeared twice in the fourth generation of his pedigree.
