= Joe Fanning =

Irish jockey

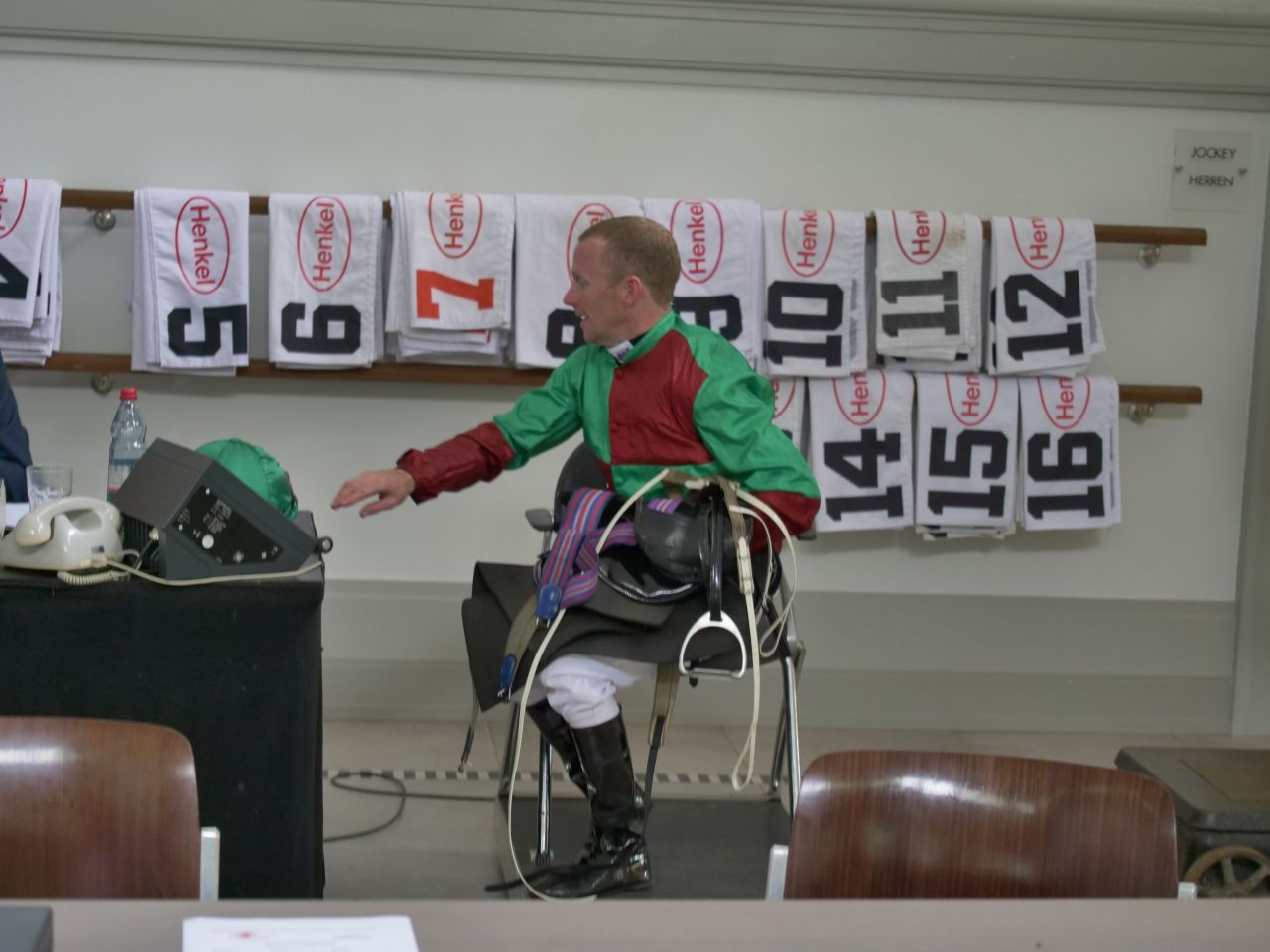

Personal information
- Born: September 24, 1970 (age 55) Dublin, Ireland
- Occupation: Jockey
- Weight: 8 st 1 lb (113 lb; 51 kg)

Horse racing career
- Sport: Horse racing

Major racing wins
- Major races Middle Park Stakes (2016); Prix Royal-Oak (2020); Ascot Gold Cup (2021)

Racing awards
- British All-Weather Champion Jockey (2009/10 & 2011/12)

Significant horses
- The Last Lion, Subjectivist
- Updated on 23 October 2023

Joseph Kevin Fanning (born 24 September 1970) is a retired Irish jockey who was based in Britain as stable jockey to Mark Johnston. He was twice All-Weather Champion Jockey. In a career spanning 36 years, he rode 2,947 winners in Britain, the seventh highest tally of any jockey in British flat racing history. The greatest success of his career was his Ascot Gold Cup victory on Subjectivist in 2021.

== Career ==
Fanning grew up in Roundwood in County Wicklow, where he was surrounded by horses. He developed an interest in racing through attending meetings at Leopardstown with his father. He graduated from the Irish Racing Academy in 1986 and was apprenticed to The Curragh trainer Kevin Connolly.

In 1988, he moved to England to work for trainer Tommy 'Squeak' Fairhurst in Middleham, Yorkshire. He rode his first winner, Holdenby, in a race over hurdles at Sedgefield on 14 November 1989. He broke two neck vertebrae in a fall at Newcastle after only three months and switched to flat racing. His first win on the flat was on Henry Will in an apprentices' handicap at Great Yarmouth on 6 June 1990 Yarmouth. He would later believe he was too light to have been a jump jockey in the first place.

He rode out his apprentice claim within two seasons, and then found it more difficult to get rides, although he won the 1993 Northumberland Plate for trainer George Moore on Highflying. In order to help his career, he began to ride out for another Middleham trainer, Mark Johnston. In 1995 he signed as a retained jockey for Johnston and his career began to recover. In 1998, he won his first Listed race, the Tote Silver Tankard at Pontefract on Three Green Leaves for Johnston. The following year he won his first Group race, the Group 3 September Stakes at Epsom on Yavana's Pace, a Johnston-trained horse on which he would also win the Prix Gladiateur at Longchamp two years later, almost to the day. He was also second twice in the Irish St Leger on Yavana's Pace - in 1999 and 2000.

Darasim, trained by Johnston, provided Fanning with his first Group 2 win, taking the Prix Kergorlay in August 2003. The horse would later provide other big race victories in the 2003 Prix Gladiateur, the 2004 Betty Barclay Rennen in Germany, and the 2004 Goodwood Cup. In 2004, Fanning secured more than £1 million in British prize money in a season for the first time. In 2006, he passed 100 winners for the first time. This was also the year of his first Royal Ascot winner - I'm So Lucky in the 2006 Wolferton Handicap. Then, in 2007, he won the King Edward VII Stakes at the Royal meeting on Boscobel, a horse on which he'd also won the Listed Glasgow Stakes at Hamilton Park. Earlier in that same season, he won the Lincoln on Very Wise for William Haggas. Also in 2007, he broke two vertebrae in his back when falling at Goodwood and was out for seven months. Other Royal Ascot victories have come on Holberg (2009 Queen's Vase), Drill Sergeant (2009 Duke of Edinburgh Stakes), Fennell Bay (2012 King George V Stakes), Hartnell (2014 Queen's Vase) and Oriental Fox (2015 and 2017 Queen Alexandra Stakes), all trained by Johnston.

Fanning's largest single prize pot to came in the Goffs Million Mile at The Curragh in September 2009 on Shakespearean, for Johnston. He won more than 100 races in Britain every season from then until 2020, with his highest total of 188 coming in 2012. Also in that period, he twice won the All-Weather Jockeys' Championship - in 2009/10 and 2011/12. In 2014, he surpassed £2 million in British prize money in a year for the only time in his career.

Although Fanning was stable jockey to Johnston, he seldom had the opportunity to ride in Group 1 races because Johnston's biggest owners had their own retained jockeys. It was only in September 2016, on his 46th birthday, Fanning finally secured his first Group 1 victory on The Last Lion in the Middle Park at Newmarket by three-quarters of a length at 25/1, having won the Group 2 Sirenia Stakes at Kempton three weeks before. Fanning later spoke of his satisfaction at winning a Group 1 after so many Group 2s and 3s. "I wouldn't have liked to face retirement without that Group 1 so I did have a feeling of relief", he said. After the race, Johnston congratulated Fanning, saying: "It's fantastic for Joe. He's ridden a huge number of winners for us over the years. He usually doesn't get the opportunity to ride in Group Ones. Hopefully he'll get a few more before he retires. He gives us loyalty. He came to us when he was just out of his apprenticeship. Many times he's been jocked off over the years and had to play second fiddle to a chain of jockeys. He never complains." Fanning responded in a rare interview by saying: "I haven't ridden out for any other trainers in 20 years or so and I respect the loyalty he has shown me. It's something that works both ways." He continued: "It's never nice being jocked off a decent horse; just because I don't complain doesn't mean it doesn't bother me."

In May 2018, Fanning achieved his first win in a Classic race, riding Nyaleti for Johnston in the Group 2 German 1,000 Guineas at Hoppegarten. He won the same race the following year on Main Edition, also trained by Johnston. He reached a mark of 2,500 winners in Great Britain on 24 August 2019 with a win at Redcar on Universal Gleam for Keith Dalgleish. He was one of only two active jockeys to reach that total, the other being Frankie Dettori.

In July 2020, Fanning rode the three-year-old Subjectivist for the first time, winning the Listed Glasgow Stakes at Hamilton Park for Johnston. Later that season, the pair won the Group 3 March Stakes at Goodwood and the Group 1 Prix Royal-Oak at Longchamp. In March 2021, they won the Group 2 Dubai Gold Cup at Meydan in Dubai. On 17 June 2021, Fanning rode Subjectivist to a five-length victory in the Ascot Gold Cup. They were applauded back into the winner's enclosure by all the jockeys who had come out of the weighing room, testament to the esteem in which Fanning was held.

Fanning fractured his humerus in June 2022, in a fall from Braes Of Doune at Musselburgh, was sidelined for a large part of the busiest time of year, which contributed to his lowest seasonal total since the 1990s. In 2023, he won the Ayr Gold Cup for the only time on Significantly and rode The Gatekeeper the 25/1 winner of the closing Balmoral Handicap on British Champions Day at Ascot. For a short time in early-to-mid-season he had headed the Jockeys Championship. In 2024, Fanning rode his tenth winner at Royal Ascot when Pilgrim, trained by David and Nicola Barron, won the Palace Of Holyroodhouse Handicap.

== Retirement ==
Fanning underwent treatment for prostate cancer at the end of 2025. The treatment was successful, but he did not return to race-riding and announced his retirement in July 2026. He said: "I've been lucky enough to experience countless special days in racing, but The Last Lion winning the Middle Park, and Subjectivist's Ascot Gold Cup success, in Dr Jim Walker's colours, will always stand out. It feels especially fitting my final ride was a winner for Johnston Racing aboard Loquella at Newcastle last November." He said he was still riding out for Johnston Racing and would be helping his wife Sarah in their sales and pre-training business. Fanning rode a total 2,947 winners on the flat in Britain, about half of them for Johnston.

== Statistics ==
Flat wins in Great Britain by year

Year	Wins	Runs	Strike rate	Total earnings
1988	0	9	0	£219
1989	0	0	0	£0
1990	17	244	7	£84,038
1991	43	527	8	£202,954
1992	45	616	7	£203,333
1993	22	513	4	£208,453
1994	14	438	3	£125,648
1995	17	302	6	£107,395
1996	19	351	5	£117,442
1997	18	270	7	£96,164
1998	18	300	6	£97,174
1999	67	603	11	£375,239
2000	63	649	10	£445,097
2001	71	725	10	£505,274
2002	76	682	11	£576,404
2003	84	753	11	£844,980
2004	97	787	12	£1,046,840
2005	76	782	10	£854,904
2006	108	938	12	£1,054,594
2007	73	462	16	£686,764
2008	82	698	12	£766,520
2009	113	712	16	£1,130,082
2010	120	895	13	£921,934
2011	103	638	16	£588,574
2012	188	1138	17	£1,149,204
2013	156	1180	13	£1,607,537
2014	168	1177	14	£2,139,833
2015	132	938	14	£1,203,609
2016	129	1025	13	£1,330,657
2017	140	849	16	£1,429,390
2018	137	935	15	£1,675,331
2019	135	810	17	£1,983,622
2020	85	744	11	£941,690
2021	80	634	13	£1,175,961
2022	41	292	14	£751,507
2023	87	556	16	£1,551,675
2024	73	584	13	£1,315,390
2025	50	431	12	£830,196

== Major wins ==
(United Kingdom) Great Britain

- Ascot Gold Cup - (1) - Subjectivist (2021)
- Middle Park Stakes - (1) - The Last Lion (2016)

France

- Prix Royal-Oak - (1) - Subjectivist (2020)
