= Stay Foolish (horse) =

Japanese Thoroughbred racehorse (2015–2022)

Stay Foolish ステイフーリッシュ
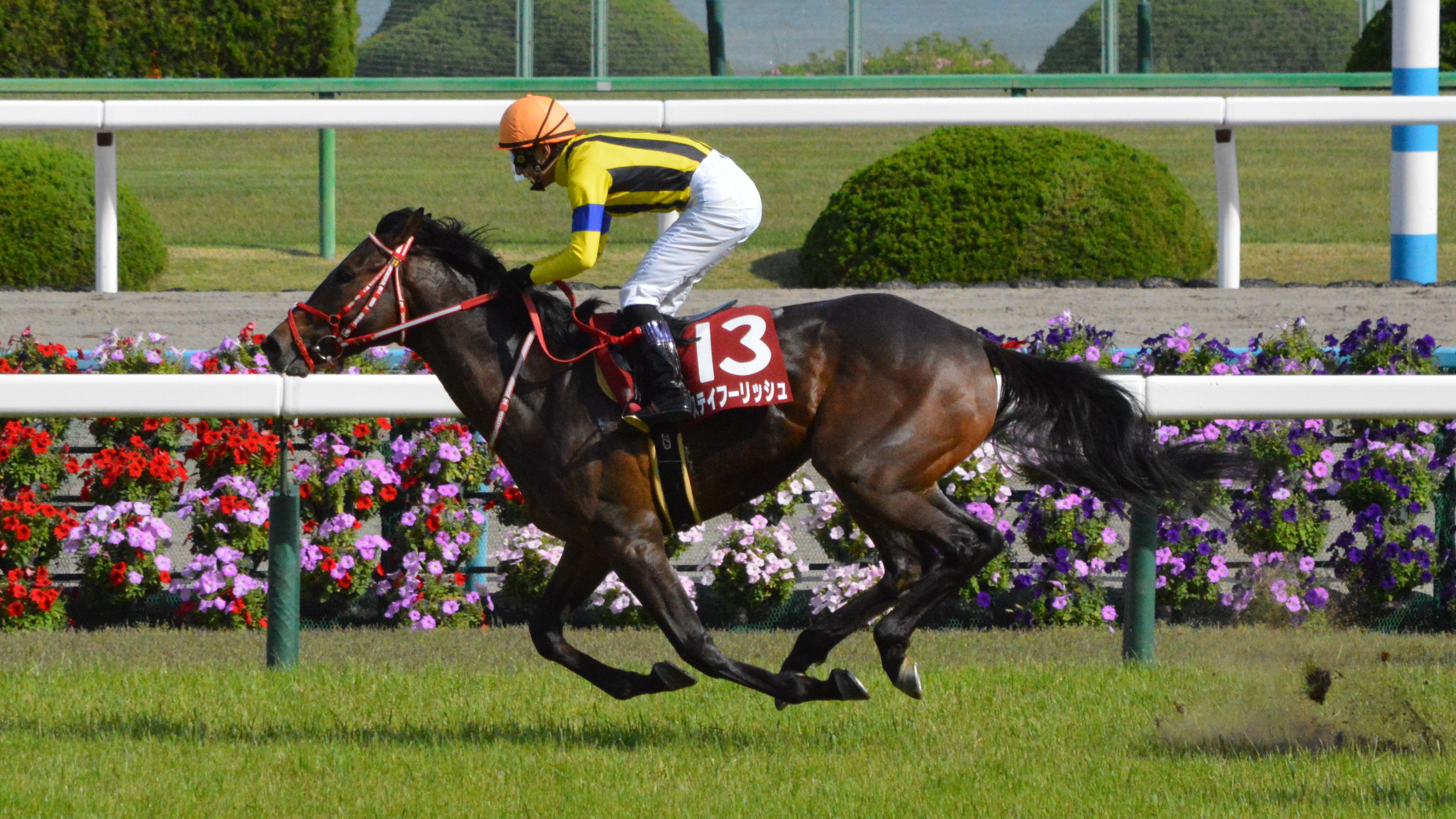
- Stay Foolish at the 2018 Kyoto Shimbun Hai
- Breed: Thoroughbred
- Sire: Stay Gold
- Grandsire: Sunday Silence
- Dam: Kauai Lane
- Damsire: King Kamehameha
- Sex: Colt->Gelding
- Foaled: 22 February 2015
- Country: Japan
- Colour: Bay
- Breeder: Shadai Farm
- Owner: Shadai Race Horse
- Racing colours
- Trainer: Yoshito Yahagi
- Jockey: Yusuke Fujioka; Christophe Lemaire; Yuta Nakatani
- Record: 34: 4-7-8 (29 JRA: 2-6-8; 5 overseas: 2-1-0)
- Earnings: ¥554,075,700

Major wins
- Kyoto Shimbun Hai (2018); Red Sea Turf Handicap (2022); Dubai Gold Cup (2022)

Stay Foolish (Japanese: ステイフーリッシュ, Hepburn: Sutei Fūrisshu; 22 February 2015) is a retired Japanese Thoroughbred racehorse. He competed from 2017 to 2022, recording four wins in thirty-four starts, including the Kyoto Shimbun Hai (GII) in 2018, the Red Sea Turf Handicap (G3) and Dubai Gold Cup (G2) in 2022. His racing name is derived from Steve Jobs' 2005 Stanford University commencement speech, "Stay Hungry, Stay Foolish."

== Background ==
Stay Foolish is a bay horse bred in Chitose, Hokkaido, by Shadai Farm. He was sired by Stay Gold, a son of Sunday Silence, and his dam was Kauai Lane, a daughter of King Kamehameha. His dam Kauai Lane won five races during her racing career, including the Turquoise Stakes (Open). His dam's half-brother is Black Hawk, winner of the Yasuda Kinen and Sprinters Stakes. He was owned by Shadai Race Horse and sent into training with Yoshito Yahagi at the JRA's Ritto Training Center.

== Racing career ==
=== 2017: Two-year-old season ===
Stay Foolish debuted on December 10, 2017, in a maiden race on the turf at Chukyo Racecourse, winning by 0.4 seconds. He finished third in the Hopeful Stakes (GI) at Nakayama Racecourse on December 28.

=== 2018: Three-year-old season ===
Stay Foolish finished tenth in the Kyodo Tsushin Hai (GIII) at Tokyo Racecourse in February. On May 5, he won the Kyoto Shimbun Hai (GII) at Kyoto Racecourse, ridden by Yusuke Fujioka, defeating Admire Alba by 0.3 seconds. He finished tenth in the Tōkyō Yūshun (Japanese Derby, GI) in May, fifth in the Kobe Shimbun Hai (GII) in September, and eleventh in the Kikuka Shō (GI) in October. He finished third in the Challenge Cup (GIII) at Hanshin Racecourse in December.

=== 2019: Four-year-old season ===
Stay Foolish ran in eight races in 2019 without a win. He finished second in the Nakayama Kimpai (GIII), Kyoto Kinen (GII), and Fukushima Kinen (GIII), and third in the Naruo Kinen (GIII) and Hakodate Kinen (GIII).

=== 2020: Five-year-old season ===
Stay Foolish ran in six races in 2020 without a win. He finished second in the American Jockey Club Cup (GII) and third in the Kyoto Kinen (GII), Meguro Kinen (GII), and All Comers (GII).

=== 2021: Six-year-old season ===
Stay Foolish finished second in the Kyoto Kinen (GII) in February. He was pulled up in the Sapporo Kinen (GII) in August after developing atrial fibrillation. He finished fifth in the Hong Kong Vase (G1) at Sha Tin Racecourse in December.

=== 2022: Seven-year-old season and retirement ===
On February 26, Stay Foolish contested the Red Sea Turf Handicap (G3) over 3000 meters at King Abdulaziz Racetrack in Saudi Arabia. Ridden by Christophe Lemaire, he took the lead from the start and won by 4.25 lengths over Sonnyboyliston, recording his first victory in three years and nine months. On March 26, he won the Dubai Gold Cup (G2) over 3200 meters at Meydan Racecourse, defeating the previously unbeaten Manobo.

Returning to Japan, he finished ninth in the Takarazuka Kinen (GI) in June. He finished second in the Grand Prix de Deauville (G2) at Deauville-La Touques Racecourse in August. He finished fourteenth in the Prix de l'Arc de Triomphe (G1) at Longchamp Racecourse in October.

On October 27, 2022, he was diagnosed with left foreleg suspensory ligamentitis. His retirement was announced the same day. He was deregistered from JRA competition on October 28, 2022.

== Statistics ==
The following table details all 34 starts of Stay Foolish's racing career based on official netkeiba, JBIS, and JRA-VAN records.

Date	Distance (Condition)	Race	Class	Course	Odds (Favourite)	Field	Finish	Time	Jockey	Winning (Losing) Margin	Winner (2nd Place)	Ref
2017 – two-year-old season
Dec 10	Turf 2000 m (Firm)	2-Y-O Newcomer	Maiden	Chukyo	5.2 (3rd)	9	1st	2:03.7	Yuta Nakatani	–0.4	(Ice Bubble)	
Dec 28	Turf 2000 m (Firm)	Hopeful Stakes	GI	Nakayama	22.9 (8th)	17	3rd	2:01.6	Yuta Nakatani	0.2	Time Flyer	
2018 – three-year-old season
Feb 11	Turf 1800 m (Firm)	Kyodo Tsushin Hai	GIII	Tokyo	5.7 (2nd)	12	10th	1:48.5	Yuta Nakatani	1.1	Oken Moon	
May 5	Turf 2200 m (Firm)	Kyoto Shimbun Hai	GII	Kyoto	12.8 (7th)	17	1st	2:11.0	Yusuke Fujioka	–0.3	(Admire Alba)	
May 27	Turf 2400 m (Firm)	Tōkyō Yūshun	GI	Tokyo	39.8 (10th)	18	10th	2:24.2	Norihiro Yokoyama	0.6	Wagnerian	
Sep 23	Turf 2400 m (Firm)	Kobe Shimbun Hai	GII	Hanshin	11.9 (4th)	10	5th	2:26.4	Yuga Kawada	0.8	Wagnerian	
Oct 21	Turf 3000 m (Firm)	Kikuka Shō	GI	Kyoto	70.2 (11th)	18	11th	3:07.5	Yusuke Fujioka	1.4	Fierement	
Dec 1	Turf 2000 m (Firm)	Challenge Cup	GIII	Hanshin	18.2 (5th)	12	3rd	1:59.0	Yusuke Fujioka	0.7	Air Windsor	
2019 – four-year-old season
Jan 5	Turf 2000 m (Firm)	Nakayama Kimpai	GIII	Nakayama	11.0 (7th)	16	2nd	1:59.3	Yusuke Fujioka	0.1	Win Bright	
Feb 10	Turf 2200 m (Firm)	Kyoto Kinen	GII	Kyoto	3.4 (1st)	12	2nd	2:14.8	Yusuke Fujioka	0.0	Danburite	
Mar 31	Turf 2000 m (Firm)	Ōsaka Hai	GI	Hanshin	94.8 (12th)	14	13th	2:02.4	Kota Fujioka	1.4	Al Ain	
Jun 1	Turf 2000 m (Firm)	Naruo Kinen	GIII	Hanshin	4.8 (4th)	9	3rd	1:59.8	Yusuke Fujioka	0.2	Mer de Glace	
Jul 14	Turf 2000 m (Firm)	Hakodate Kinen	GIII	Hakodate	6.4 (3rd)	16	3rd	1:59.9	Yuta Nakatani	0.3	My Style	
Aug 18	Turf 2000 m (Firm)	Sapporo Kinen	GII	Sapporo	32.9 (8th)	14	9th	2:01.0	Yuta Nakatani	0.9	Blast Onepiece	
Nov 10	Turf 2000 m (Firm)	Fukushima Kinen	GIII	Fukushima	12.9 (6th)	16	2nd	1:59.7	Yuta Nakatani	0.2	Crescendo Love	
Nov 30	Turf 2000 m (Firm)	Challenge Cup	GIII	Hanshin	7.3 (4th)	12	10th	1:59.7	Yuta Nakatani	0.6	Lord My Way	
2020 – five-year-old season
Jan 26	Turf 2200 m (Good)	American Jockey Club Cup	GII	Nakayama	8.0 (5th)	12	2nd	2:15.2	Christophe Lemaire	0.2	Blast Onepiece	
Feb 16	Turf 2200 m (Soft)	Kyoto Kinen	GII	Kyoto	4.3 (3rd)	9	3rd	2:17.1	Yasunari Iwata	0.7	Chrono Genesis	
Apr 5	Turf 2000 m (Firm)	Ōsaka Hai	GI	Hanshin	49.1 (8th)	12	9th	1:59.4	Yasunari Iwata	1.0	Lucky Lilac	
May 31	Turf 2500 m (Firm)	Meguro Kinen	GII	Tokyo	13.8 (7th)	18	3rd	2:29.8	Ryusei Sakai	0.2	King of Coji	
Sep 27	Turf 2200 m (Good)	All Comers	GII	Nakayama	4.9 (3rd)	9	3rd	2:15.7	Hironobu Tanabe	0.2	Centelleo	
Oct 11	Turf 2400 m (Good)	Kyoto Daishoten	GII	Kyoto	7.3 (4th)	17	5th	2:26.0	Yusuke Fujioka	0.4	Glory Vase	
2021 – six-year-old season
Jan 24	Turf 2200 m (Heavy)	American Jockey Club Cup	GII	Nakayama	9.5 (4th)	17	4th	2:18.3	Shu Ishibashi	0.4	Aristoteles	
Feb 14	Turf 2200 m (Firm)	Kyoto Kinen	GII	Hanshin	7.0 (3rd)	11	2nd	2:10.6	Ryuji Wada	0.2	Loves Only You	
Aug 22	Turf 2000 m (Firm)	Sapporo Kinen	GII	Sapporo	14.7 (6th)	13	DNF	–	Ryusei Sakai	–	Sodashi	
Sep 26	Turf 2200 m (Firm)	All Comers	GII	Nakayama	20.3 (7th)	16	5th	2:12.3	Kazuo Yokoyama	0.4	Win Marilyn	
Oct 10	Turf 2400 m (Firm)	Kyoto Daishoten	GII	Hanshin	8.4 (5th)	14	7th	2:25.1	Yoshihiko Kawasu	0.6	Makahiki	
Nov 14	Turf 2000 m (Firm)	Fukushima Kinen	GIII	Fukushima	6.7 (3rd)	16	4th	1:59.9	Ryusei Sakai	0.7	Panthalassa	
Dec 12	Turf 2400 m (Firm)	Hong Kong Vase	G1	Sha Tin	13.0 (4th)	8	5th	2:28.45	Vincent C Y Ho	1.38	Glory Vase	
2022 – seven-year-old season
Feb 26	Turf 3000 m (Firm)	Red Sea Turf Handicap	G3	KAA	15.0 (8th)	14	1st	3:06.08	Christophe Lemaire	–0.73	(Sonnyboyliston)	
Mar 26	Turf 3200 m (Firm)	Dubai Gold Cup	G2	Meydan	5.0 (2nd)	13	1st	3:19.64	Christophe Lemaire	–0.5	(Manobo)	
Jun 26	Turf 2200 m (Firm)	Takarazuka Kinen	GI	Hanshin	78.1 (10th)	17	9th	2:11.1	Ryusei Sakai	1.4	Titleholder	
Aug 28	Turf 2500 m (Firm)	Grand Prix de Deauville	G2	Deauville	3.6 (2nd)	5	2nd	2:36.41	Cristian Demuro	0.18	Botanik	
Oct 2	Turf 2400 m (Soft)	Prix de l'Arc de Triomphe	G1	Longchamp	65.0 (18th)	20	14th	2:39.16	Christophe Lemaire	3.45	Alpinista	

== Post-racing career ==
Following his retirement, Stay Foolish became a riding horse at Shadai Farm in Chitose, Hokkaido.

== Pedigree ==
Pedigree of Stay Foolish (JPN)
Sire Stay Gold (JPN) 1994	Sunday Silence (USA); 1986	Halo	Hail to Reason
Sire Stay Gold (JPN) 1994	Sunday Silence (USA); 1986	Halo	Cosmah
Sire Stay Gold (JPN) 1994	Sunday Silence (USA); 1986	Wishing Well	Understanding
Sire Stay Gold (JPN) 1994	Sunday Silence (USA); 1986	Wishing Well	Mountain Flower
Sire Stay Gold (JPN) 1994	Golden Sash (JPN); 1988	Dictus	Sanctus
Sire Stay Gold (JPN) 1994	Golden Sash (JPN); 1988	Dictus	Doronic
Sire Stay Gold (JPN) 1994	Golden Sash (JPN); 1988	Dyna Sash	Northern Taste
Sire Stay Gold (JPN) 1994	Golden Sash (JPN); 1988	Dyna Sash	Royal Sash
Dam Kauai Lane (JPN) 2006	King Kamehameha (JPN); 2001	Kingmambo	Mr. Prospector
Dam Kauai Lane (JPN) 2006	King Kamehameha (JPN); 2001	Kingmambo	Miesque
Dam Kauai Lane (JPN) 2006	King Kamehameha (JPN); 2001	Manfath	Last Tycoon
Dam Kauai Lane (JPN) 2006	King Kamehameha (JPN); 2001	Manfath	Pilot Bird
Dam Kauai Lane (JPN) 2006	Silver Lane (USA); 1985	Silver Hawk	Roberto
Dam Kauai Lane (JPN) 2006	Silver Lane (USA); 1985	Silver Hawk	Gris Vitesse
Dam Kauai Lane (JPN) 2006	Silver Lane (USA); 1985	Strait Lane	Chieftain
Dam Kauai Lane (JPN) 2006	Silver Lane (USA); 1985	Strait Lane	Level Sands

- Stay Foolish is inbred 4 × 5 to Hail to Reason.
- His dam Kauai Lane won five races including the Turquoise Stakes (Open).
- His dam's half-brother Black Hawk won the Yasuda Kinen (GI) and Sprinters Stakes (GI).

== See also ==
- Thoroughbred racing in Japan
- Kyoto Shimbun Hai
- Dubai Gold Cup
