= March Stakes =

Flat horse race in Britain

- Location: Goodwood Racecourse; W. Sussex, England
- Inaugurated: 1965
- Race type: Flat
- Sponsor: William Hill
- Website: Goodwood

Race information
- Distance: 1m 6f (2,816 metres)
- Surface: Turf
- Track: Right-handed
- Qualification: Three-years-old
- Weight: 9 st 4 lb Allowances; 5 lb for fillies and mares Penalties; 5 lb for Group 1 or 2 winners * 3 lb for Group 3 winners * * after 2021
- Purse: £100,000 (2022); 1st: £56,710

March Stakes
2022
Hoo Ya Mal	Perfect Alibi	Animato

Previous years
2021
Dancing King	Nagano	Classic Lord

2020-2011
2020
Subjectivist	Cabaletta	Celtic Art
2019
Sir Ron Priestley	Promissory	Manuela De Vega
2018
Maid Up	Ben Vrackie	Cypress Creek
2017
Call To Mind	Count Octave	Uae King
2016
Platitude	Vive Ma Fille	Mr Singh
2015
The Twisler	Fun Mac	Vive Ma Fille
2014
Forever Now	Alex My Boy	Kings Fete
2013
Harris Tweed	Mount Athos	Tac De Boistron
2012
Quest For Peace	Electrolyser	Berling
2011
Motrice	Eternal Heart	Drunken Sailor

2010-2001
2010
Drunken Sailor	Bergo	Caucus
2009
Mourilyan	Victoria Montoya	Oasis Knight
2008
Tungsten Strike	Petara Bay	Shahin
2007
Tungsten Strike	Samuel	Land 'n Stars
2006
Jadalee	Barolo	Akarem
2005
Mubtaker	Unfurled	Centaurus
2004
Orange Touch	Swift Tango	Stage Right
2003
First Charter	Scott's View	Romany Prince
2002
First Charter	Spanish John	Savannah Bay
2001
Shamaiel	Putra Sandhurst	Akbar

2000-1991
2000
Alva Glen	Kuwait Trooper	Samsaam
1999
Yavana's Pace	Iscan	Adnaan
1998
Ta-Lim	Generous Terms	Napoleon's Sister
1997
Pentad	Palio Sky	Book At Bedtime
1996
Sharaf Kabeer	Masehaab	Summer Spell
1995
Jellaby Askhir	Wot-If-We	Only two ran
1994
Midnight Legend	Pearl Kite	Golden Ball
1993
Shaiba	Azilian	Urgent Request
1992
Rain Rider	Allegan	Currency Basket
1991
Jahafil	Arcadian Heights	La Sky

1990-1988
1990
River God	Judicial Hero	Crack
1989
Michelozzo	Demawend	Noble Savage
1988
Zaffaran	Mazzacano	Maksud

The March Stakes was a flat horse race in Great Britain open to horses aged three years. It was run at Goodwood over a distance of 1 mile and 6 furlongs (2,816 metres), and was scheduled to take place each year in late August.

== History ==
The event was named after the Earldom of March, a title inherited by the eldest son of the Duke of Richmond, the owner of Goodwood Racecourse. It was established when a new fixture was introduced at the venue in 1965.

The race was originally restricted to three-year-olds, and it was formerly a leading trial for the St. Leger Stakes. The first horse to achieve victory in both events was Commanche Run in 1984, and the latest was Michelozzo in 1989.

The March Stakes was opened to older horses in 1999 and closed to them again from 2017. In 2018 it was upgraded to Group 3 status as part of the European Pattern Committee's commitment to improving the race programme for stayers in Europe. The race was removed from the Pattern and Listed race programme in 2023.

From 2018 the race was run in memory of John Dunlop (1939-2018), a racehorse trainer who trained at Arundel, near Goodwood.

== Records ==
Most successful horse (2 wins):

- First Charter – 2002, 2003
- Tungsten Strike – 2007, 2008

Leading jockey (4 wins):

- Willie Carson – Water Mill (1980), Band (1983), Jahafil (1991), Rain Rider (1992)

Leading trainer (7 wins):

- Sir Michael Stoute – Zaffaran (1988), Shaiba (1993), Ta-Lim (1998), Alva Glen (2000), First Charter (2002, 2003), Platitude (2016)

== Winners ==
Year	Winner	Age	Jockey	Trainer	Time
1965	Vivat Rex	3	Johnny Roe	Walter Wharton	3:15.00
1966	Wrekin Rambler	3	Terry Stringer	Sir Gordon Richards	3:09.60
1967	Dart Board	3	Scobie Breasley	Sir Gordon Richards	3:07.00
1968	Deep Sapphire	3	Stan Smith	Cecil Boyd-Rochfort	3:12.80
1969	Ribofilio	3	Lester Piggott	Fulke Johnson Houghton	3:10.60
1970	Hazy Idea	3	Lester Piggott	Dick Hern	3:01.40
1971	Alderney	3	Geoff Baxter	Arthur Budgett	3:06.71
1972	Scottish Rifle	3	Ron Hutchinson	John Dunlop	3:00.63
1973	Honey Crepe	3	Paul Cook	Jack Watts	3:02.84
1974	Crash Course	3	Tony Kimberley	Jeremy Hindley	3:03.36
1975	Whip It Quick	3	Tony Murray	Ryan Price	3:05.06
1976	Marquis de Sade	3	Brian Taylor	Ryan Price	3:02.63
1977	Sporting Yankee	3	Pat Eddery	Peter Walwyn	3:17.44
1978	Le Moss	3	Joe Mercer	Henry Cecil	3:03.84
1979 (Note: The 1979 running took place at Ascot)	Torus	3	John Reid	Fulke Johnson Houghton	2:35.93
1980	Water Mill	3	Willie Carson	Dick Hern	2:42.71
1981	Capstan	3	Joe Mercer	Dick Hern	2:58.83
1982	Santella Man	3	Greville Starkey	Guy Harwood	3:00.65
1983	Band	3	Willie Carson	Dick Hern	3:09.30
1984	Commanche Run	3	Darrel McHargue	Luca Cumani	2:59.47
1985	Abandoned due to waterlogging
1986	Celestial Storm	3	Walter Swinburn	Luca Cumani	3:03.61
1987	Ala Hounak	3	Billy Newnes	Frankie Durr	2:57.88
1988	Zaffaran	3	Walter Swinburn	Michael Stoute	3:03.44
1989	Michelozzo	3	Steve Cauthen	Henry Cecil	3:00.77
1990	River God	3	Steve Cauthen	Henry Cecil	3:01.97
1991	Jahafil	3	Willie Carson	Dick Hern	3:02.25
1992	Rain Rider	3	Willie Carson	John Dunlop	3:07.71
1993	Shaiba	3	Michael Roberts	Michael Stoute	3:01.86
1994	Midnight Legend	3	Frankie Dettori	Luca Cumani	3:04.07
1995	Jellaby Askhir	3	Ray Cochrane	Reg Akehurst	3:03.40
1996	Sharaf Kabeer	3	Frankie Dettori	Saeed bin Suroor	3:06.57
1997	Pentad	3	Frankie Dettori	Roger Charlton	3:06.39
1998	Ta-Lim	3	Richard Hills	Sir Michael Stoute	3:09.16
1999	Yavana's Pace	7	Richard Hughes	Mark Johnston	3:04.70
2000	Alva Glen	3	Pat Eddery	Sir Michael Stoute	3:05.13
2001	Shamaiel	4	Jamie Spencer	Gerard Butler	3:01.74
2002	First Charter	3	Kieren Fallon	Sir Michael Stoute	3:01.00
2003	First Charter	4	Kieren Fallon	Sir Michael Stoute	3:00.43
2004	Orange Touch	4	Johnny Murtagh	Amanda Perrett	3:09.47
2005	Mubtaker	8	Richard Hills	Marcus Tregoning	3:02.27
2006	Jadalee	3	Dale Gibson	Marcus Tregoning	3:02.37
2007	Tungsten Strike	6	Darryll Holland	Amanda Perrett	3:04.47
2008	Tungsten Strike	7	Darryll Holland	Amanda Perrett	3:06.28
2009	Mourilyan	5	Ryan Moore	Gary L. Moore	3:00.71
2010	Drunken Sailor	5	Kieren Fallon	Luca Cumani	3:07.34
2011	Motrice	4	Seb Sanders	Sir Mark Prescott	3:03.42
2012	Quest for Peace	4	Richard Hughes	Luca Cumani	3:07.99
2013	Harris Tweed	6	George Baker	William Haggas	3:04.87
2014	Forever Now	3	William Buick	John Gosden	3:02.43
2015	The Twisler	3	Frederik Tylicki	Jane Chapple-Hyam	3:05.07
2016	Platitude	3	Andrea Atzeni	Sir Michael Stoute	3:00.28
2017	Call To Mind	3	Pat Cosgrave	William Haggas	3:05.23
2018	Maid Up	3	Rob Hornby	Andrew Balding	3:02.76
2019	Sir Ron Priestley	3	Franny Norton	Mark Johnston	3:01.21
2020	Subjectivist	3	Joe Fanning	Mark Johnston	3:11.09
2021	Dancing King	3	Joe Fanning	Mark Johnston	3:01.62
2022	Hoo Ya Mal	3	William Buick	George Boughey	3:04.31

== See also ==
- Horse racing in Great Britain
- List of British flat horse races
