= King George V Stakes =

Flat horse race in Great Britain

- Class: Handicap
- Location: Ascot Racecourse; Ascot, England
- Race type: Flat / Thoroughbred
- Website: Ascot

Race information
- Distance: 1m 3f 211y (2,406 metres)
- Surface: Turf
- Track: Right-handed
- Qualification: Three-years-old
- Weight: Handicap
- Purse: £110,000 (2025); 1st: £56,694

King George V Stakes
2026
Enceladus	Al Azd	Believed

Previous years
2025
Merchant	Serious Contender	Pantile Warrior
2024
Going The Distance	Neski Sherelski	Go Daddy
2023
Desert Hero	Valiant King	Bertinelli
2022
Secret State	Deauville Legend	Israr
2021
Surefire	Sir Lamorak	Parachute

2020-2011
2020
Hukum	Kipps	Subjectivist
2019
South Pacific	Constantinople	Eminence
2018
Baghdad	Corgi	First Eleven
2017
Atty Persse	First Nation	Bear Valley
2016
Primitivo	Platitude	Harrison
2015
Space Age	Scottish	Marma's Boy
2014
Elite Army	Windshear	Captain Morley
2013
Elidor	Space Ship	Bold Sniper
2012
Fennell Bay	Handsome Man	Rougemont
2011
Brown Panther	Census	Well Sharp

2010-2001
2010
Dandino	London Stripe	Caucus
2009
Cosmic Sun	Chiberta King	Barwell Bridge
2008
Colony	Savarain	Moonquake
2007
Heron Bay	Filios	Walking Talking
2006
Linas Selection	Enjoy The Moment	Bandama
2005
Munsef	Sunday Symphony	Consular
2004
Admiral	Maraahel	Etmaam
2003
Fantastic Love	Salsalino	Lodger
2002
Systematic	Highest	Leadership
2001
Beekeeper	Tomasino	Arabie

2000-1991
2000
Give The Slip	Water Jump	Film Script
1999
Elmutabaki	Tier Worker	Biennale
1998
Double Classic	Emerald Heights	Blueprint
1997
Heritage	Taunt	Ciro's Pearl
1996
Samraan	Private Song	Harbour Dues
1995
Diaghilef	Bob's Ploy	Monarch
1994
Midnight Legend	Red Route	Durable
1993
Learmont	Pistol River	Master Charlie
1992
Source Of Light	Wild Fire	Inner City
1991
Torchon	Latour	Regent's Folly

1990-1985
1990
Lift And Load	Afkar	Distinct Native
1989
Carlingford	Ruddy Lucky	Cossack Guard
1988
Thethingaboutitis	Nikitas	Stratford Ponds
1987
Pipsted	Brave Dancer	Kribensis
1986
Moon Madness	Weshaam	Dalgadiyr
1985
Grand Pavois	Effigy	Eagling

The King George V Stakes is a flat handicap horse race in Great Britain open to three-year-old horses. It is run at Ascot over a distance of 1 mile 3 furlongs and 211 yards (2,406 metres), and it is scheduled to take place each year in June on the third day of the Royal Ascot meeting.

== Records ==
Leading jockey (4 wins):

- Lester Piggott – Sunny Way (1960), Brave Knight (1965), Marcus Brutus (1966), Sea Chimes (1979)
- Pat Eddery – John O'Groats (1980), Carlingford (1989), Source Of Light (1992), Give The Slip (2000)

Leading trainer (6 wins):

- Mark Johnston - Diaghilef (1995), Systematic (2002), Fantastic Love (2003), Linas Selection (2006), Fennell Bay (2012), Baghdad (2018)

== Winners ==
Year	Winner	Weight	Jockey	Trainer	Time
1946	Auralia	8–04	Doug Smith	Reg Day	2:38.40
1947 (dh)	Golden Chance; Boy Blue	8–01; 7-05	Sir Gordon Richards; Albert Richardson	William Pratt; Marcus Marsh	2:36.40
1948	Lake Placid	8–01	Joe Sime	John Watts Jr.	2:38.00
1949	Iron Duke	8–04	Edgar Britt	Marcus Marsh	2:32.20
1950	Coastal Wave	8–05	Eph Smith	William Easterby	2:37.00
1951	Le Sage	8–08	Billy Nevett	Tommy Carey	2:32.80
1952	Giuliano	7–12	Eph Smith	Walter Nightingall	2:32.00
1953	Lepidoptic	7–12	Willie Snaith	Frank Armstrong	2:39.00
1954	Gads Hill	8–03	Billy Nevett	Fred Winter Sr.	2:37.80
1955	Jardiniere	7–09	Doug Smith	Noel Murless	2:34.14
1956	Donald	8–02	Manny Mercer	Jack Jarvis	2:35.40
1957	Clouds	7–12	Manny Mercer	George Colling	2:32.00
1958	Quick Decision	7–13	Frankie Durr	Charles Elsey	2:32.98
1959	Suki Desu	8–05	Stan Clayton	Walter Nightingall	2:32.77
1960	Sunny Way	8–06	Lester Piggott	Noel Murless	2:36.10
1961	Vinca	7–13	Bobby Elliott	E Parker	2:37.10
1962	Panjandrum	8–00	Eric Eldin	John Waugh	2:36.11
1963	Master Cappelle	9–00	Brian Taylor	Harvey Leader	2:43.54
1964	Abandoned due to waterlogging
1965	Brave Knight	9–05	Lester Piggott	Walter Nightingall	2:38.34
1966	Marcus Brutus	8–10	Lester Piggott	Sam Hall	2:39.34
1967	Sharavogue	8–00	Geoff Lewis	Ian Balding	2:36.66
1968	Tudor Abbe	7–13	Ron Hutchinson	Peter Nelson	2:35.66
1969	Precipice Wood	7–09	Paul Cook	Rosemary Lomax	2:31.70
1970	Clip Joint	7-02	Philip Waldron	Sam Hall	2:34.77
1971	Royal Dancer	7–11	Willie Carson	Peter Walwyn	2:39.04
1972	Relpin	8–12	Willie Carson	Bernard van Cutsem	2:34.82
1973	Zab	7–05	Taffy Thomas	Dick Hern	2:38.34
1974	Dakota	8–03	Eddie Hide	Sam Hall	2:29.34
1975	Zimbalon	8–05	Joe Mercer	Dick Hern	2:32.22
1976	Shangamuzo	7–07	David Maitland	Gavin Hunter	2:31.86
1977	Celtic Pleasure	7–10	Richard Fox	J Bethell	2:39.22
1978	M-Lolshan	8-02	Willie Carson	Ryan Price	2:33.59
1979	Sea Chimes	8-06	Lester Piggott	John Dunlop	2:34.12
1980	John O'Groats	8-04	Pat Eddery	John Winter	2:34.12
1981	Feltwell	7–13	Bryn Crossley	Harry Wragg	2:31.29
1982	Mubarak Of Kuwait	8-08	Greville Starkey	Guy Harwood	2:29.82
1983	Dazari	9–07	Walter Swinburn	Michael Stoute	2:31.07
1984	Rough Pearl	7–10	Taffy Thomas	Geoff Lewis	2:28.30
1985	Grand Pavois	9-07	Steve Cauthen	Henry Cecil	2:31.32
1986	Moon Madness	9-04	Cash Asmussen	John Dunlop	2:29.96
1987	Pipsted	8-00	Gary Carter	Geoff Wragg	2:38.10
1988	Thethingaboutitis	7-07	Tony Culhane	Geoff Lewis	2:30.29
1989	Carlingford	8-04	Pat Eddery	Guy Harwood	2:29.31
1990	Lift And Load	9-01	Brian Rouse	Richard Hannon Sr.	2:33.26
1991	Torchon	8-07	Gary Carter	Geoff Wragg	2:32.36
1992	Source Of Light	8–10	Pat Eddery	Roger Charlton	2:29.56
1993	Learmont	8-08	John Carroll	John Gosden	2:37.90
1994	Midnight Legend	7–13	Jason Weaver	Luca Cumani	2:28.25
1995	Diaghilef	8–12	Darryll Holland	Mark Johnston	2:30.58
1996	Samraan	9-03	Richard Quinn	John Dunlop	2:31.11
1997	Heritage	8-06	Frankie Dettori	John Gosden	2:34.33
1998	Double Classic	8–12	John Reid	Sir Michael Stoute	2:38.44
1999	Elmutabaki	8–12	Richard Hills	Barry Hills	2:29.75
2000	Give The Slip	9-04	Pat Eddery	Amanda Perrett	2:31.65
2001	Beekeeper	9-07	Johnny Murtagh	Sir Michael Stoute	2:28.91
2002	Systematic	8–12	Kevin Darley	Mark Johnston	2:29.98
2003	Fantastic Love	8–11	Keith Dalgleish	Mark Johnston	2:29.85
2004	Admiral	8-03	Nicky Mackay	Sir Michael Stoute	2:31.30
2005 (Note: The 2005 running took place at York)	Munsef	8-07	Richard Hills	John Dunlop	2:29.24
2006	Linas Selection	8-09	Kevin Darley	Mark Johnston	2:27.24
2007	Heron Bay	8–11	Steve Drowne	Geoff Wragg	2:30.11
2008	Colony	8–12	Ryan Moore	Sir Michael Stoute	2:30.62
2009	Cosmic Sun	7–12	Paul Hanagan	Richard Fahey	2:31.29
2010	Dandino	8–13	Paul Mulrennan	James Given	2:30.51
2011	Brown Panther	8–13	Richard Kingscote	Tom Dascombe	2:36.93
2012	Fennell Bay	8-01	Joe Fanning	Mark Johnston	2:35.59
2013	Elidor	9-00	Martin Harley	Mick Channon	2:30.81
2014	Elite Army	9-01	Kieren Fallon	Saeed bin Suroor	2:30.59
2015	Space Age	8–10	William Buick	Charlie Appleby	2:29.71
2016	Primitivo (Note: The 2016 winner Primitivo was later exported to Hong Kong and renamed Gold Mount)	8–10	William Twiston-Davies	Alan King	2:34.51
2017	Atty Persse	8–10	Kieran Shoemark	Roger Charlton	2:31.68
2018	Baghdad	8–12	Andrea Atzeni	Mark Johnston	2:28.36
2019	South Pacific	8–10	Seamie Heffernan	Aidan O'Brien	2:32.74
2020	Hukum	8–11	Jim Crowley	Owen Burrows	2:32.97
2021	Surefire	8–9	Hector Crouch	Ralph Beckett	2:32.39
2022	Secret State	9-06	William Buick	Charlie Appleby	2:32.43
2023	Desert Hero	8–13	Tom Marquand	William Haggas	2:29.56
2024	Going The Distance	9–02	Rossa Ryan	Ralph Beckett	2:30.04
2025	Merchant	9–04	Tom Marquand	William Haggas	2:29.44
2026	Enceladus	8–12	Ryan Moore	Joseph O'Brien	2:29.74

== See also ==
- Horse racing in Great Britain
- List of British flat horse races
