= Mark Johnston (racehorse trainer) =

Scottish horse trainer

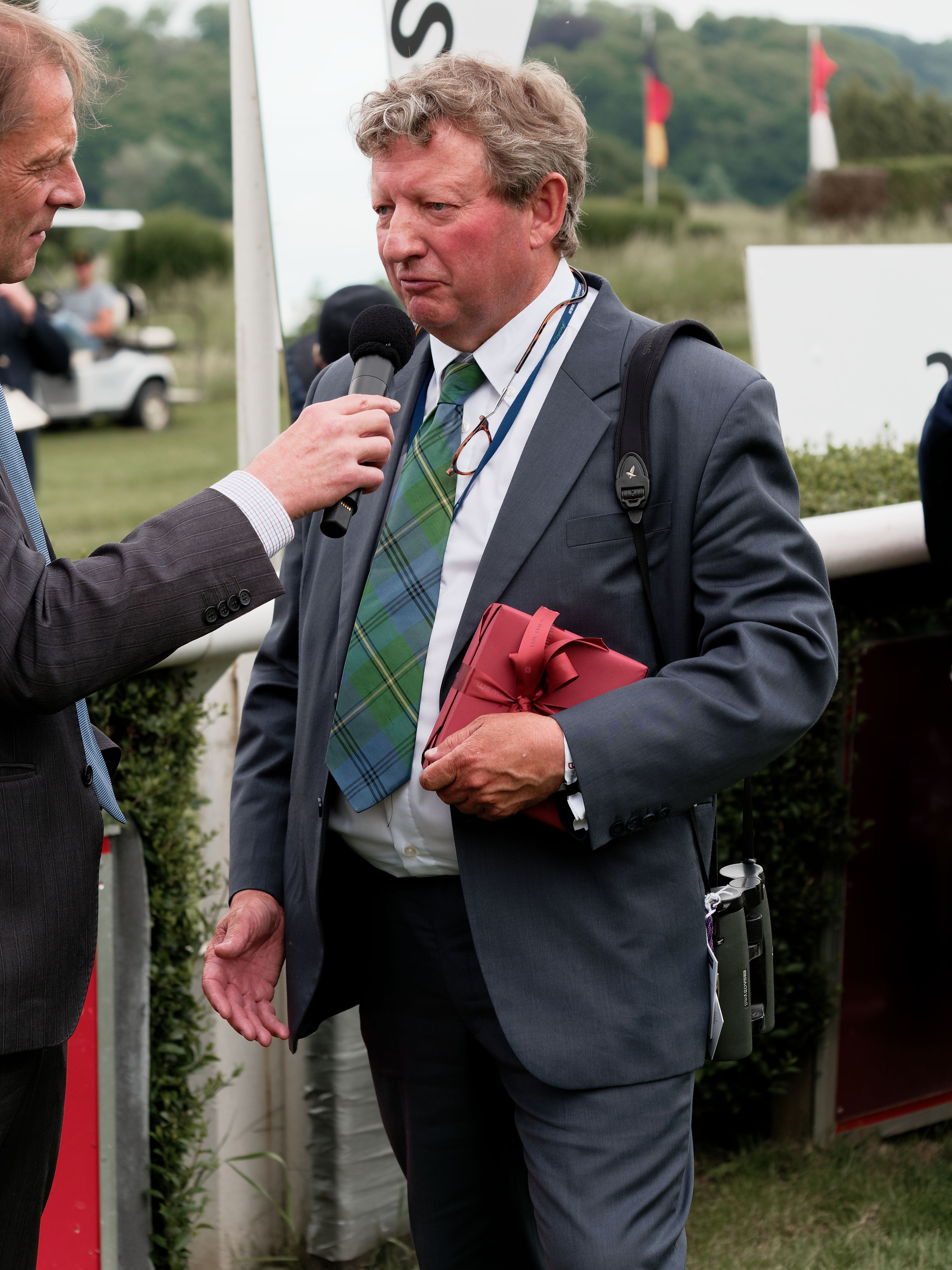
- Johnston in 2018

Personal information
- Nationality: Scottish
- Born: 10 October 1959 (age 66) Glasgow, Scotland
- Home town: Glasgow
- Education: University of Glasgow
- Occupation: Racehorse trainer
- Spouse: Deirdre Johnston
- Children: Charlie Johnston, Angus Johnston

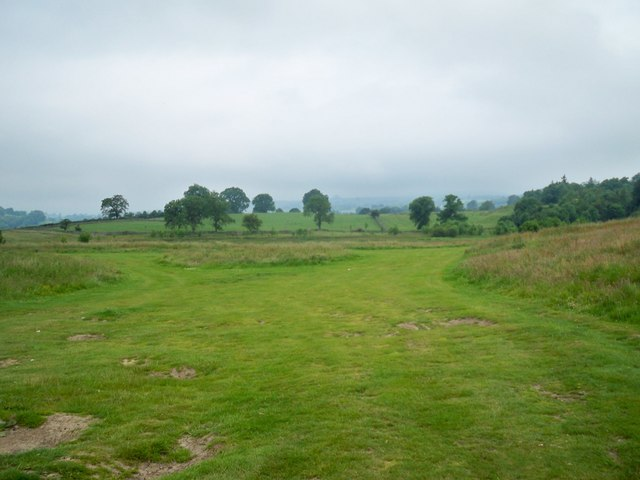
Middleham Lower Moor, near where Johnston trains

Mark Johnston (born 10 October 1959) is a Scottish racehorse trainer based in Middleham, North Yorkshire, England.

Born in Glasgow, he studied at the University of Glasgow and is a qualified vet. He started training at a stable near Louth, Lincolnshire in 1987, and his first winner was Hinari Video at Carlisle He has been training in Middleham since 1988 when he purchased Kingsley House (often falsely attributed to be the former home of Charles Kingsley, author of The Water Babies).

In 2004 he won the 1,000 Guineas with Attraction. Other successful horses he has trained are Mister Baileys, winner of the 2,000 Guineas, Shamardal, 2004 European Champion Two-Year-Old, and Double Trigger, winner of the Ascot Gold Cup.

Johnston's horses are known for their front running style and bravery in a finish, two attributes that were best advertised by the exploits of Attraction. He cites Shamardal as the best horse he ever trained, and Attraction as the one he is most proud of.

He reached his 4,000th winner on the flat in Britain when Dominating won at Pontefract on Monday 23 October 2017. He is only the third trainer in either code to reach that figure.

On 23 August 2018 Johnston became the most successful British Flat trainer of all time when Frankie Dettori rode Poet's Society to win the 3.00 at York at odds of 20–1 to give Mark his 4,194 winner. In August 2022 he took his number of winners to 5,000 when Dubai Mile won at Kempton Park.

In January 2022 Johnston's son and assistant trainer, Charlie, joined him as joint training licence holder. As joint trainers the pair were responsible for 176 winners in 2022. In December 2022 Mark Johnston announced that he would step down from the training licence, leaving Charlie as the sole trainer with Mark as assistant trainer. Johnston stressed that he wasn't retiring and the training partnership would continue as before.

The motto of the stable is "Always Trying".

He is married to Deirdre, a former teacher.

== Major wins ==
(United Kingdom) Great Britain

- 1,000 Guineas – (1) – Attraction (2004)
- 2,000 Guineas – (1) – Mister Baileys (1994)
- Ascot Gold Cup – (4) – Double Trigger (1995), Royal Rebel (2001, 2002), Subjectivist (2021)
- Cheveley Park Stakes – (1) – Lumiere (2015)
- Coronation Stakes – (1) – Attraction (2004)
- Dewhurst Stakes – (1) – Shamardal (2004)
- Falmouth Stakes – (1) – Nahoodh (2008)
- Fighting Fifth Hurdle - (1) - Star Rage (1997)
- Middle Park Stakes – (2) – Awzaan (2009), The Last Lion (2016)
- St. James's Palace Stakes – (1) – Bijou d'Inde (1996)
- Sun Chariot Stakes – (1) – Attraction (2004)

France

- Critérium de Saint-Cloud – (2) – Gear Up (2020), Dubai Mile (2022)
- Prix Royal-Oak – (1) – Subjectivist (2020)

Germany

- Bayerisches Zuchtrennen – (1) – Lady Jane Digby (2010)
- Preis von Europa – (1) – Jukebox Jury (2009)
- Rheinland-Pokal – (1) – Yavana's Pace (2002)
- German 1,000 Guineas – (2) – Nyaleti (2018), Main Edition (2019)

(Republic of Ireland) Ireland

- Irish 1,000 Guineas – (1) – Attraction (2004)
- Irish St. Leger – (1) – Jukebox Jury (dead heat 2011)
- Matron Stakes – (1) – Attraction (2005)
- Phoenix Stakes – (1) – Princely Heir (1997)

Italy

- Gran Criterium – (3) – Lend a Hand (1997), Pearl of Love (2003), Kirklees (2006)

United Arab Emirates

- Dubai Sheema Classic – (1) – Fruits of Love (1999)
