= Promising Lead =

British-bred Thoroughbred racehorse

- Sire: Danehill
- Grandsire: Danzig
- Dam: Arrive
- Damsire: Kahyasi
- Sex: Mare
- Foaled: 6 March 2004
- Country: United Kingdom
- Colour: Bay
- Breeder: Juddmonte Farms
- Owner: Khalid Abdullah
- Trainer: Michael Stoute
- Record: 7: 4-2-0
- Earnings: £213,415

Major wins
- Upavon Fillies' Stakes (2007); Middleton Stakes (2008); Pretty Polly Stakes (2008)

Promising Lead (foaled 6 March 2004) is a British Thoroughbred racehorse and broodmare. She did not race until she was three years old in 2007 when she won a maiden race on her debut and went on to win the Upavon Fillies' Stakes before being narrowly beaten in the Group 1 Prix de l'Opéra. In the following year she won the Middleton Stakes and the Pretty Polly Stakes on her only two starts. As a broodmare she produced several minor winners.

== Background ==
Promising Lead is a bay mare bred in England by her owner Khalid Abullah's Juddmonte Farms. She was sent into training with Michael Stoute at Newmarket, Suffolk.

She was sired by Danehill, a sprinter who won the Cork and Orrery Stakes and Haydock Sprint Cup in 1989. He went on to become a highly successful breeding stallion, producing the winners of more than one thousand races including 156 at Group One/Grade I level. Among his best offspring are Dylan Thomas, Duke of Marmalade, Rock of Gibraltar George Washington and North Light. Promising Lead's dam Arrive showed good form in a brief racing career, winning three of her five races including the Listed Bahrain Trophy in 2001. As a broodmare she produced several other winners including the Princess Margaret Stakes winner Visit. Arrive was a full-sister to the outstanding broodmare Hasili and a granddaughter of Sookera.

== Racing career ==
=== 2007: three-year-old season ===
Promising Lead did not race as a two-year-old and made her track debut in a maiden race over seven furlongs at Newbury Racecourse on 20 April 2007 in which she was ridden by Frankie Dettori. Starting the 100/30 favourite she took the lead in the last quarter mile and won "cosily" by half a length and a neck from Sister Act and Graduation.

Four weeks after her winning debut, Promising Lead was stepped up in class for the Listed Michael Seely Memorial Stakes over one mile at York Racecourse and started the 10/11 favourite. Ridden by Kerrin McEvoy she raced in second before taking the lead in the final furlong but was overtaken in the closing stages and beaten a neck by Silver Pivotal. In the following month at Newcastle Racecourse the filly was partnered by Ryan Moore (who rode her in all of her subsequent races) when she was matched against older fillies and mares in the Listed Hoppings Stakes over ten furlongs on soft ground. She started favourite but tired badly in the last two furlongs and came home fourth behind the six-year-old Mango Mischief, beaten more than ten lengths by the winner. On 15 August Promising Lead started 5/2 second favourite behind the Sandringham Handicap winner Barshiba in the Listed Upavon Fillies' Stakes over ten furlongs at Salisbury Racecourse. Moore settled the filly in third place as Shorthand set the pace from Russian Rosie. She took the lead two furlongs out and kept on well in the closing stages to win by two and a half lengths from Sell Out.

On 7 October Promising Lead was sent to France and moved up to Group 1 for the Prix de l'Opéra over 2000 metres at Longchamp Racecourse. Moore restrained the filly towards the rear before making a forward move in the straight and going to the front entering the last 200 metres. She was caught on the line and beaten a head by the French-trained five-year-old Satwa Queen with Finsceal Beo and Light Shift finishing unplaced.

=== 2008: four-year-old season ===
Promising Lead began her second campaign in the Group 3 Middleton Stakes over ten furlongs at York on 15 May and was made the 2/5 favourite in a five-runner field. She took the lead in the last quarter mile and went clear of her rivals to win by three and three quarter lengths from the Zetland Stakes winner Under The Rainbow. On 28 June the filly was sent to Ireland for the Group 1 Pretty Polly Stakes at the Curragh Racecourse and started 2/1 favourite ahead of Finsceal Beo. The other seven runners were Mad About You (runner up in the Irish 1000 Guineas), Sail (Cheshire Oaks), Anna Pavlova (Prix de Royallieu), Marjalina (Park Express Stakes), Ice Queen (Noblesse Stakes), She's Our Mark (Desmond Stakes) and Beach Bunny. Promising Lead tracked the leader Ice Queen until going to the front inside the last two furlongs and kept on well to win by one and a quarter lengths from Mad About You with another four and a half lengths back to Ana Pavlova in third place. Michael Stoute "She is a really big, scopey, progressive filly and improved through last year "She started off this season winning well at York and she is really coming to herself."

The Nassau Stakes, Yorkshire Oaks and Breeders' Cup were mentioned as targets for the filly, but she never raced again and was retired at the end of the season.

== Breeding record ==
After her retirement from racing Promising lead became a broodmare for Juddmonte Farms. As of July 2019 she had produced seven foals and five winners:

- Vital Evidence, a bay colt (later gelded), foaled in 2010, sired by Empire Maker. Won two races.
- Surcingle, bay filly, 2011, by Empire Maker. Won one race.
- Lead Along, bay filly, 2012, by Smart Strike. Won one race.
- Acoustic, grey colt (gelded), 2013, by Tapit. Won two races.
- Lupin, bay filly, 2014, by Medaglia d'Oro. Failed to win in two races.
- First Response, bay colt (gelded), 2015, by First Defence. Won one race.
- Detective, bay colt, 2016, by Kingman. Unraced.

== Pedigree ==
Pedigree of Promising Lead (GB), bay mare, 2004
Sire Danehill (USA) 1986	Danzig (USA); 1977	Northern Dancer (CAN)	Nearctic
Sire Danehill (USA) 1986	Danzig (USA); 1977	Northern Dancer (CAN)	Natalma (USA)
Sire Danehill (USA) 1986	Danzig (USA); 1977	Pas de Nom	Admiral's Voyage
Sire Danehill (USA) 1986	Danzig (USA); 1977	Pas de Nom	Petitioner (GB)
Sire Danehill (USA) 1986	Razyana (USA); 1981	His Majesty	Ribot (GB)
Sire Danehill (USA) 1986	Razyana (USA); 1981	His Majesty	Flower Bowl
Sire Danehill (USA) 1986	Razyana (USA); 1981	Spring Adieu (CAN)	Buckpasser (USA)
Sire Danehill (USA) 1986	Razyana (USA); 1981	Spring Adieu (CAN)	Natalma (USA)
Dam Arrive (GB) 1998	Kahyasi (IRE); 1985	Ile de Bourbon (USA)	Nijinsky (CAN)
Dam Arrive (GB) 1998	Kahyasi (IRE); 1985	Ile de Bourbon (USA)	Roseliere (FR)
Dam Arrive (GB) 1998	Kahyasi (IRE); 1985	Kadissya (USA)	Blushing Groom (FR)
Dam Arrive (GB) 1998	Kahyasi (IRE); 1985	Kadissya (USA)	Kalkeen (IRE)
Dam Arrive (GB) 1998	Kerali (GB); 1984	High Line	High Hat
Dam Arrive (GB) 1998	Kerali (GB); 1984	High Line	Time Call
Dam Arrive (GB) 1998	Kerali (GB); 1984	Sookera (USA)	Roberto
Dam Arrive (GB) 1998	Kerali (GB); 1984	Sookera (USA)	Irule (Family: 11)

- Like all of Danehill's offspring Promising Lead was inbred 4 × 4 to the mare Natalma. This means that she occurs twice in the fourth generation of her pedigree.
