= Cavalryman (horse) =

British-bred Thoroughbred racehorse

- Sire: Halling
- Grandsire: Diesis
- Dam: Silversword
- Damsire: Highest Honor
- Sex: Stallion
- Foaled: 9 May 2006
- Country: United Kingdom
- Colour: Bay
- Breeder: Darley Stud
- Owner: Sheikh Mohammed; Godolphin
- Trainer: André Fabre; Saeed bin Suroor
- Record: 39: 10-5-5
- Earnings: £1,929,292

Major wins
- Prix Matchem (2009); Grand Prix de Paris (2009); Prix Niel (2009); Grand Cup (2012); Coral Marathon (2012); Dubai Gold Cup (2013); Nad Al Sheba Trophy (2014); Princess of Wales's Stakes (2014); Goodwood Cup (2014)

Cavalryman (9 May 2006 – 28 February 2015) was a British-bred Thoroughbred racehorse. In eight seasons of racing he won ten times from thirty-nine starts in six countries, namely France, the United Arab Emirates, the United Kingdom, Germany, Italy and Australia. Beginning his career in France he won one race as a juvenile but developed to become one of the best colts of his generation in 2009, winning the Prix Matchem, Grand Prix de Paris and Prix Niel as well as running third in the Prix de l'Arc de Triomphe. After being transferred to the British/Emirati stable of Saeed bin Suroor he failed to win a race for the next two years but recovered his form when switched to competing over extended distances. He won the Grand Cup and Coral Marathon in 2012, the Dubai Gold Cup in 2013 and the Nad Al Sheba Trophy, Princess of Wales's Stakes and Goodwood Cup in 2014 at the age of eight. Cavalryman was fatally injured in a race at Meydan Racecourse in February 2015.

== Background ==
Cavalryman was a dark bay horse with no white markings bred in England by his owner Sheikh Mohammed's Darley Stud. He was sent into training with André Fabre in France.

He was sired by Halling, a top-class performer who won two editions of both the Eclipse Stakes and the International Stakes. Halling's best offspring included Jack Hobbs, Opinion Poll (Dubai Gold Cup), Cavalryman and Norse Dancer (Earl of Sefton Stakes). Cavalryman's dam Silversword showed some racing ability, winning one minor race and being narrowly beaten in the Prix de Royaumont. She was a great-granddaughter of the American broodmare Basin foaled in 1972 whose other female-line descendants have included Nathaniel and Great Heavens.

== Racing career ==
=== 2008: two-year-old season ===
Cavalryman was ridden in both of his races as a two-year-old by Maxime Guyon. After finishing fourth on his debut on 7 September at Longchamp Racecourse he recorded his first success in a minor event over 1600 metres at Saint-Cloud Racecourse on 10 October, coming home two lengths clear of his eight opponents at odds of 3.1/1.

=== 2009: three-year-old season ===
On his three-year-old debut Cavalryman ran fourth behind Allybar in the Prix François Mathet over 2000 metres at Saint-Cloud on 29 March but then produced a much better performance over the same course and distance on 12 May when he was beaten half a length by his stablemate Cutlass Bay in the Group 2 Prix Greffulhe. The Listed Prix Matchem again over 2000 metres at Saint-Cloud on 1 June saw Cavalryman start odds-on favourite against six opponents. He led from the start and won "very easily" by six lengths from Cirrus des Aigles. In the Group 1 Grand Prix de Paris over 2400 metres at Longchamp on 14 July the colt started second favourite behind the Aga Khan's Beheshtam in an eight-runner field which also included Mastery and a four horse entry from the Aidan O'Brien stable. Cavalryman produced a strong run on the outside in the straight, took the lead 200 metres out and won by one and a half lengths from Age of Aquarius. Fabre commented "I was quite confident coming into the race as he is a progressive horse by Halling and he has won nicely. He is effective from a mile and a quarter on heavy ground to a mile and a half".

After a break of almost two months, Cavalryman returned for the Prix Niel, a race which often serves as a major trial for the Prix de l'Arc de Triomphe, at Longchamp on 13 September. Racing for the first time in the blue silks of Godolphin he was partnered by Frankie Dettori with Guyon taking the ride on the stable's second string Claremont (Prix du Lys). Starting the 4/7 favourite he prevailed in a tight finish, taking the lead in the closing stages and winning by half a length from Beheshtam, with Aizavoski and Claremont close behind. After the race Dettori said "The pace wasn't very strong and he was too relaxed early. He was half-asleep. The race turned into a two-furlong sprint, but he picked up well when I asked him". In the Prix de l'Arc de Triomphe on 4 October Cavalryman started the 12/1 fourth choice in the betting in a nineteen-runner field. With Dettori in the saddle he stayed on well in the straight and finished third, two lengths and a head behind Sea the Stars and Youmzain.

In the 2009 World Thoroughbred Rankings Cavalryman was given a rating of 125, making him the seventh-best racehorse in the world.

=== 2010 & 2011: four- & five-year-old season ===
At the end of the 2009 season Cavalryman was transferred to the stable of Saeed bin Suroor, whose trainees typically spend the summer in England and the winter in Dubai. He began 2010 with two runs at Meydan Racecourse but made little impact, coming home seventh in the Al Maktoum Challenge, Round 3 and fifth in the Dubai Sheema Classic. After returning to Europe he ran six times, all at Group 1 level, but failed to win a race. He finished fifth in the Coronation Cup, last in the Prince of Wales's Stakes, fourth in the International Stakes, third in the Grosser Preis von Baden, eighth in the Prix de l'Arc de Triomphe and third in the Gran Premio del Jockey Club. He was ridden in all of his races by Dettori. Cavalryman's rating of 117 placed him 127th in the 2010 World Thoroughbred Rankings.

Cavalryman ran five times in 2011 and for the second straight year he failed to win a race. He finished fourth in the Gordon Richards Stakes and then dropped back to Listed class and ran second to Jukebox Jury in the Fred Archer Stakes. After finishing last in both the Grosser Preis von Berlin and the Rheinland-Pokal he was stepped up in distance for the Prix Royal-Oak and ran fifth.

=== 2012: six-year-old season ===
Cavalryman began his fifth season at Meydan where he ran second in the Dubai City of Gold and seventh in the Sheema Classic. On his first start of the year in Europe the horse started the 9/4 second favourite for the Listed Grand Cup over fourteen furlongs at York Racecourse on 26 May. Ridden by Dettori he took the lead approaching the final furlong and recorded his first win in more than two and a half years as he came home two lengths clear of Calico Cat. Six weeks later he was stepped up to two miles for the Coral Marathon at Sandown Park and won in "very decisive" fashion, coming home four and a half lengths in front of the Cesarewitch winner Aaim To Prosper [sic].

After finishing fourth in the Lonsdale Cup at York and second in the Rose Bowl Stakes at Newmarket Racecourse he was sent to Australia to contest the Melbourne Cup on 6 November. Starting at odds of 30/1 he finished twelfth, beaten seven and a half lengths by the winner Green Moon.

=== 2013: seven-year-old season ===
Cavalryman was back in Dubai for his first two starts of 2013 and was ridden on both occasions by Silvestre de Sousa. In the Dubai City of Gold on 9 March he led for most of the way but was overtaken in the last 100 metres and finished third, beaten half a length and a short head behind Jakkalberry and Await the Dawn. Three weeks later, over two miles at Meydan, Cavalryman started at odds of 11/2 for the second running of the Dubai Gold Cup. The 2012 Grand Prix de Paris winner Imperial Monarch was made favourite while the other eight runners included Saddler's Rock (Goodwood Cup), Tenenbaum (Prix de Reux), Verema (Prix de Lutèce) and Ahzeemah (Nad Al Sheba Trophy). Cavalryman started slowly but took the lead 300 metres out and won "comfortably" by three lengths from Ahzeemah.

Cavalryman was less successful on his return to Europe. He finished fifth in the Henry II Stakes, third in the Princess of Wales's Stakes and sixth behind Brown Panther in the Goodwood Cup on 1 August. He did not race again that year.

=== 2014: eight-year-old season ===
For the fifth time, Cavalryman began his campaign in Dubai, making his first appearance in the Group 3 Nad Al Sheba Trophy over 2800 metres at Meydan for which he started 3/1 joint-favourite with the Queen Alexandra Stakes winner Simenon. Ridden by De Sousa he went to the front 300 metres from the finish and drew away to win "comfortably" by five and a half lengths from the South African gelding Star Empire. The horse started 7/4 favourite when he attempted to repeat his 2013 success in the Dubai Gold Cup on 29 March but despite staying on strongly in the straight he failed by a neck to overhaul the 33/1 Irish outsider Certerach.

Cavalryman was back in Europe for the Princess of Wales's Stakes over one and a half miles at Newmarket on 10 July and was made the 9/1 fourth choice in a six-runner field. Arab Spring the winner of the Duke of Edinburgh Stakes at Royal Ascot started favourite ahead of Hillstar (King Edward VII Stakes) and Pether's Moon. Cavalryman led from the start and set a slow pace before accelerating two furlongs out and got the better of a "sustained duel" with Hillstar to win by a neck with Pether's Moon half a length back in third place. De Sousa commented "He's very tough and genuine. He has been unlucky, but he's come back. I'm just delighted for him to come here and get his head in front".

Three weeks later Cavalryman was moved back up in trip for the Goodwood Cup over two miles in which he was ridden by Kieren Fallon and started the 5/1 third favourite behind Estimate and Brown Panther. The other five runners included Forgotten Voice (Royal Hunt Cup), Angel Gabrial (Northumberland Plate) and Ahzeemah. After racing towards the rear of the closely grouped field, Cavalryman took the lead two furlongs out and despite hanging right in the final furlong he held on to win by a neck from Ahzeemah with the pair finishing more than four lengths clear of Brown Panther in third. After the race Fallon said "He's a real tough horse. He was campaigned during the Carnival in Dubai all winter and he has just come here and won a Goodwood Cup, which is a difficult race to win. It's one thing sprinters keeping their form from Dubai but it's hard to do it with distance horses".

On his final run of the season Cavalryman ran fourth behind the Irish mare Pale Mimosa in the Lonsdale Cup at York on 22 August.

Cavalryman's rating of 115 placed him 202nd in the 2014 World's Best Racehorse Rankings.

=== 2015: nine-year-old season ===
Cavalryman made his debut in the Nad Al Sheba Trophy at Meydan on 28 February in which he was ridden by William Buick and started the 11/10 favourite. After racing for seven furlongs he was pulled up after sustaining a serious fracture to his right hind leg. He was immediately transported to the local equine hospital but the injury proved to be untreatable and he was euthanised. Saeed bin Suroor said "He was a real character in the yard and was treasured, not only by me, but by everyone here—all of the team. We are very upset by the tragic news. He had a wonderful career and he will be hugely missed".

== Pedigree ==
Pedigree of Cavalryman (GB), bay horse 2016
Sire Halling (USA) 1991	Diesis (GB); 1980	Sharpen Up	Atan
Sire Halling (USA) 1991	Diesis (GB); 1980	Sharpen Up	Rocchetta (GB)
Sire Halling (USA) 1991	Diesis (GB); 1980	Doubly Sure	Reliance (FR)
Sire Halling (USA) 1991	Diesis (GB); 1980	Doubly Sure	Soft Angels
Sire Halling (USA) 1991	Dance Machine (GB); 1982	Green Dancer (USA)	Nijinsky (CAN)
Sire Halling (USA) 1991	Dance Machine (GB); 1982	Green Dancer (USA)	Green Valley (FR)
Sire Halling (USA) 1991	Dance Machine (GB); 1982	Never A Lady (IRE)	Pontifex (USA)
Sire Halling (USA) 1991	Dance Machine (GB); 1982	Never A Lady (IRE)	Camogie (GB)
Dam Silversword (FR) 1993	Highest Honor; 1983	Kenmare	Kalamoun (GB)
Dam Silversword (FR) 1993	Highest Honor; 1983	Kenmare	Belle of Ireland (GB)
Dam Silversword (FR) 1993	Highest Honor; 1983	High River	Riverman (USA)
Dam Silversword (FR) 1993	Highest Honor; 1983	High River	Hairbrush (USA)
Dam Silversword (FR) 1993	Silver Cobra (USA); 1986	Silver Hawk	Roberto
Dam Silversword (FR) 1993	Silver Cobra (USA); 1986	Silver Hawk	Gris Vitesse
Dam Silversword (FR) 1993	Silver Cobra (USA); 1986	Copperhead	Hawaii (SAF)
Dam Silversword (FR) 1993	Silver Cobra (USA); 1986	Copperhead	Basin (Family: 9-f)
