= Franny Norton =

English jockey

Personal information
- Born: Liverpool, England
- Occupation: Jockey

Horse racing career
- Sport: Horse racing
- Career wins: 1,904 (in Great Britain)

Racing awards
- British flat racing Champion Apprentice runner-up (1991); Lester Awards; Flat Ride of the Year (1999)

Significant horses
- Archduke Ferdinand, Making Miracles, Permian, Sir Ron Priestley
- Updated on 18 February 2026

Francis Charles "Franny" Norton (b. Liverpool, 28 July 1970) is a retired flat racing jockey, who won nearly 2,000 races in a 36-year career, including 12 Group races and 3 at Royal Ascot. He was known for his long association with the Mark Johnston stable, for whom he won many major races.

== Career ==
Norton was born to a non-racing background in Belle Vale, Liverpool in 1970. As a child his first sporting interests were boxing and judo but then he “went to some stables, one thing led to another and the rest is history".

He made his debut on Chateau Perigord at Chepstow on 30 May 1988, finishing third. His first winner came the following year on Stoneyford at Pisa in Italy. Shortly afterwards, almost a year since his first ride, he had his first British winner - Easter Glory on 3 May 1989 at Salisbury. As an apprentice, he worked for a number of stables, including Peter Arthur, Charlie Nelson, Alan Bailey and Geoff Wragg.

An early big race victory came while still an apprentice on Halkopous in the 1991 John Smith's Magnet Cup at York and he would follow up by winning that season's Ebor Handicap at the same course for Sir Michael Stoute on Deposki. He finished as runner-up to Darryl Holland, albeit a distant one, in that year's apprentice championship with 40 wins.

Having ridden out his claim, he then struggled for a few seasons (although he did win the Group 3 Chipchase Stakes on Piccolo) and considered changing careers to become a boxer. He won the stable lads' boxing title eight times and was selected to represent England at the sport at the 1998 Commonwealth Games in Kuala Lumpur, but in the end turned down the opportunity to continue racing after a friend who had worked in both racing and boxing told him there was nothing for him in pro boxing. His racing career soon began to take an upturn.

In 1999, he won the Cambridgeshire Handicap on She's Our Mare, a feat for which he won the Lester Award for flat ride of the season. The next year, he passed 50 winners for the first time, a target he would reach in all but four seasons for the rest of his career. He also won his first race at Royal Ascot, the Britannia Stakes on El Gran Papa, repeating the feat in 2001 on Analyser. His other Royal Ascot victory would come in the 2007 Buckingham Palace Stakes on Binanti. The 2001 Northumberland Plate gave him another big race win, on Archduke Ferdinand.

His first Listed race success was on Foxhaven for Patrick Chamings in Chester's Stand Cup in 2006. Later that year, he had his first Group race winner, Princess Iris in Ayr's Firth of Clyde Stakes. In 2007, he rode a Group winner for the Queen - Banknote in the Group 3 Badener Meile at Baden-Baden in Germany.

By now he had forged a connection with the Mark Johnston stable, a partnership which would continue for the rest of his career - first with Mark, then under his son Charlie. Of the partnership, Norton remarked, "Mark was unbelievably loyal to me. I was offered a few jobs when I was doing well there but there was no way I was ever going to leave. I rode lots of winners, there were plenty of horses and Mark was great to ride for." An outside ride on Our Jonathan for Kevin Ryan in 2011 gave him a win the Ayr Gold Cup, which would be the second highest rated performance of his career.

His biggest payday was the Weatherbys Insurance £300,000 2-Y-O Stakes in 2012 at Doncaster which he won on The Gold Cheongsam. He dedicated that win to the victims of the Hillsborough disaster, as it was the day after Liverpool fans had been cleared of any wrongdoing and said it was one of his most memorable victories.

Towards the end of his career, the number and quality of his winners increased. In 2018, he had his most successful year numerically - 112 winners - placing him joint-tenth in the jockeys’ championship. He also twice won the Group 2 Dante Stakes - on Permian (an "incredibly tough" horse that "never got the chance to properly fulfil his potential") in 2017 and Thunderous in 2020. He attributed some of this late career success to a network of support from sport scientists at Liverpool's John Moores University.

A fruitful partnership with the Johnston-trained Sir Ron Priestley, brought him victory in Goodwood's March Stakes in 2019, the Group 2 Princess of Wales's Stakes and Group 2 Jockey Club Stakes of 2021, as well as the Listed Barry Hills Further Flight Stakes, although the horse's greatest performance may have been his second place in the 2019 St Leger, the closest Norton ever came to Classic victory. "I loved Sir Ron because he wore his heart on his sleeve. Whenever I do anything, I like to give my all and he was exactly the same."

He partnered more than 150 winners at Chester, double that of any other jockey, earning him the nickname "The King of Chester". However, the course's most notable race, the Chester Cup eluded him until 2019 when he finally landed it on board, Making Miracles. "I'd won most races at Chester but always wanted to win the Chester Cup. I was beaten a short-head in 2000 on a horse called Ansar for Dermot Weld and I thought I'd won the race. I kept coming close after that but then Making Miracles didn't just win it in 2019, he killed them. The heavens opened, the ground was testing and I was drawn right out in stall 16 but he won by six lengths, which was a special moment."

== Retirement ==
Norton had his final rides at Chester's last meeting of the season on 21 September 2024. He rode a treble on three short-priced favourites, ending a career characterised by "tireless graft and impressive consistency".

Speaking of his decision, he said, "when you're riding at my level, the game retires you. A lot of people call it a day due to a battle with the scales but I've had a battle to get on them. I was still fit and hungry for it but if the opportunities aren't coming all you're doing is blocking the pathway to your next chapter... When I look back, I knew nothing about horses when I started in racing but I went on to ride nearly 2,000 winners and I'm proud to have reached that level." Although he never won a Group 1 in his career, he had previously said it wouldn't be something he would lose any sleep over.

On life after retirement, he spoke of his hopes of supporting young people from deprived areas and to help them break into the racing industry.

== Personal life ==
He supports Liverpool and keeps a doberman called Nova.

== See also ==
- List of jockeys
