= Sergeant Cecil =

British-bred Thoroughbred racehorse (1999–2024)

- Sire: King's Signet
- Grandsire: Nureyev
- Dam: Jadidh
- Damsire: Touching Wood
- Sex: Gelding
- Foaled: 2 May 1999
- Died: 23 June 2024 (aged 25)
- Country: United Kingdom
- Colour: Chestnut
- Breeder: Don Hazzard
- Owner: Terry Cooper
- Trainer: Seamus Mullins; Rod Millman
- Record: 53: 10–14–6
- Earnings: £828,127

Major wins
- Northumberland Plate (2005); Ebor Handicap (2005); Cesarewitch Handicap (2005); Lonsdale Cup (2006); Doncaster Cup (2006); Prix du Cadran (2006); Yorkshire Cup (2007)

Sergeant Cecil (2 May 1999 – 23 June 2024) was a British Thoroughbred racehorse. Sold very cheaply as a foal, he was a slow-maturing stayer who showed unremarkable form in his first four seasons and took fourteen attempts to win his first race. As a six-year-old in 2005 he made rapid improvement and completed a unique treble in handicap races when he won the Northumberland Plate, Ebor Handicap and Cesarewitch Handicap. In the following year he made a successful transition to weight-for-age races, taking the Lonsdale Cup, Doncaster Cup and Prix du Cadran. He was never as good again, but recorded a final major victory in the 2007 Yorkshire Cup. He was an example of a "hold up" horse who typically dropped to the back of the field before coming with a late charge in the closing stages.

== Background ==
Foaled on 2 May 1999, Sergeant Cecil was a chestnut with a white blaze and four white socks horse bred in Dorset by Don Hazzard. When the foal was six months old he was purchased privately by Terry Cooper for £1,000 with a further £400 to be paid if he won two races. Cooper named the horse after his father, Sergeant Cecil Edward Cooper. The colt was gelded and sent into training with Seamus Mullins. The trainer's stable groom Lou Griffin remembered him as "very cheeky, never nasty, but very cocksure, very much the big I am... He was always doing something you'd want to stop him doing".

He was the most successful racehorse sired by King's Signet, a sprinter who recorded his biggest win in the Stewards' Cup. Sergeant Cecil's dam Jadidh was a durable mare who contested 66 races and won seven times over hurdles. She was descended from Rockfoil, a half-sister to Rockfel.

== Racing career ==
=== Early career ===
Sergeant Cecil ran twice as juvenile in 2001, and showed no racing ability as he finished unplaced in maiden races at Kempton Park Racecourse on 24 September and Bath Racecourse a week later, starting at odds of 100/1 on both occasions. In the following year the gelding failed to make any impression in his first four races, running unplaced in minor staying events. After being transferred to the Devon stable of Rod Millman in late summer he showed some improvement without managing to win a race as he ran second four times and third once in his remaining five starts of the season.

In 2003 the gelding made steady progress and recorded his first success at his fourteenth attempt when he took a minor handicap race over one and three quarter miles at Sandown Park on 27 May. In similar events over the same course and distance he ran second on 14 June and then won again on 4 July. He was beaten on his three subsequent starts but showed good form when finishing second in the stayers' race at the Shergar Cup.

As a five-year-old Sergeant Cecil continued to show solid, but unremarkable form in handicaps. He was placed in competitive events at Goodwood, Doncaster Racecourse and Haydock Park but his only success came over one and a half miles at Ascot Racecourse on 9 July.

=== 2005: Six-year-old season ===
Alan Munro, who was returning to England after several years riding in Hong Kong, took over as Sergeant Cecil's jockey in 2005. The gelding began his season in middle-distance handicaps, finishing unplaced at Epsom in April, running second at Newbury in May and taking third place at Epsom on 4 June. Three weeks later he carried a weight of 120 pounds in the Northumberland Plate over two miles at Newcastle Racecourse and started at odds of 14/1 in a twenty-runner field. He was restrained by Munro in the early stages but began to make rapid progress on the inside rail in the straight. He weaved his way through the field, overtook the front-running Tungsten Strike inside the final furlong and won by one and a half lengths.

After finishing third in a handicap at Goodwood Racecourse in July, Sergeant Cecil was one of twenty horses to contest the Ebor Handicap over one and three quarter miles at York on 17 August when he carried 124 pounds and started at odds of 11/1. In a repeat of the tactics employed at Newcastle, he came from well of the pace, squeezed though a narrow gap in the straight and won by a length from the top weight Carte Diamond. Alan Munro said, "We had a good run today. It took me a while to get in early but once I did they went a real steady pace and that really helped. He has got a great turn of foot and got there when he needed to".

In September Sergeant Cecil was moved up in class for the Group 2 Doncaster Cup and finished second of the seven runners behind Millenary. On his final run of the year, the gelding carried top weight of 134 pounds in the Cesarewitch over two and a quarter miles at Newmarket Racecourse on 15 October and started at 10/1 against 33 opponents. As in his two previous major wins he produced a strong late run in the last quarter mile after being held up by Munro for most of the race. He gained the advantage in the final strides and won by a length from King Revo, becoming the first horse to win the Northumberland Plate, Ebor and Cesarewitch in the same year. Millman commented "He needs a confident jockey on him and that's what Alan is", while Munro said "I owe Rod a lot. He was the first to help me out when I came back, so it's brilliant to pay him back".

=== 2006: Seven-year-old season ===
In 2006 Sergeant Cecil eschewed handicap competition and was campaigned exclusively in weight-for-age races. He began his campaign by coming home fourth behind Mubtaker in the John Porter Stakes at Newbury in April and then ran second to Percussionist in the Yorkshire Cup in May. In the Ascot Gold Cup in June he came home fourth behind Yeats and was then dropped in class for the Listed Esher Stakes at Sandown in July, a race in which he started the 5/6 favourite but was beaten a neck by Land 'n Stars. On 3 August he ran fourth behind Yeats, Geordieland and Tungsten Strike in the Goodwood Cup after struggling to obtain a clear run in the straight. Frankie Dettori took over the ride from Munro when the gelding contested the Lonsdale Cup at York nineteen days later and was made the 11/4 favourite against ten opponents including Tungsten Strike, Franklins Gardens (2005 Yorkshire Cup), Kasthari (Doncaster Cup) and The Whistling Teal (Ormonde Stakes). After racing towards the rear of the field, Sergeant Cecil produced his customary late run, gained the advantage in the last hundred yards, and won by half a length from Franklins Gardens.

Dettori was again in the saddle on 8 September when Sergeant Cecil started favourite for the "Doncaster Cup", which was run that year at York. Tungsten Strike and Kasthari were again in opposition while the best fancied of the other five runners where the eleven-year-old Alcazar (Prix Royal-Oak) and the Irish mare Clara Allen. Sergeant Cecil came from the rear of the field to take the lead approaching the final furlong and won by a length from Alcazar. Rod Millman said "The horse is a privilege to be involved with. He's just a great credit to the team, I'm just the front man" while Dettori added "This horse hasn't stopped surprising people and he's become a household name. He doesn't know how to run a bad race and he's always there for you".

On 1 October the gelding was sent to France and was made the 2/1 favourite for the Group 1 Prix du Cadran over 4000 metres at Longchamp Racecourse in which he was faced by six opponents including Alcazar, Reefscape (winner of the race in 2005), Le Miracle (Prix Gladiateur) and Shamdala (Gran Premio di Milano). Sergeant Cecil turned into the straight in sixth place and overcame trouble in running before overhauling the leader Shamdala in the last 200 metres and winning by three-quarters of a length. His victory was enthusiastically received and he was described as "Britain's most popular horse". Three weeks later Sergeant Cecil returned to Longchamp for the Prix Royal Oak and finished strongly to take third place behind the four-year-olds Montare and Bellamy Cay.

=== Later career ===
As in the previous year, Sergeant Cecil began his 2007 campaign in April by finishing fourth in the John Porter Stakes before contesting the Yorkshire Cup in May. He was ridden by Jimmy Fortune at York and started the 100/30 favourite in a ten-runner field which included Munsef (King George V Stakes), The Last Drop (runner-up in the St Leger), Allegretto, Geordieland (Grand Prix de Chantilly) and Percussionist. After racing towards the rear as usual, Sergeant Cecil came with a late rush, gained the advantage inside the final furlong and won by three quarters of a length from Geordieland.

Sergeant Cecil made no impact in his three remaining races that year. He finished tailed-off in last place behind Yeats in the Ascot Gold Cup, sixth of seven behind Dylan Thomas in an ambitious bid for the King George VI and Queen Elizabeth Stakes and fifth to Septimus when attempting to repeat his 2006 victory in the Lonsdale Cup. He missed the rest of the season after contracting a "nasty lung infection".

Sergeant Cecil remained in training as a nine-year-old but was unable to recover his best form, running unplaced in the John Porter Stakes, Yorkshire Cup and Henry II Stakes. After finishing last of eight behind Yeats in the Goodwood Cup on 3 August he was retired from racing. Terry Cooper commented "He was not just the horse of a lifetime but of a dozen lifetimes – he has been absolutely fantastic and it has been a privilege to own him. Cecil has taken me to places I never thought I would go to and has enabled me to meet people I would never have met. As a horse he is a real gentleman with a lovely temperament and a sound constitution".

== Retirement ==
After his retirement from racing Sergeant Cecil was sent for re-training as a dressage horse and was then used as a mount for the trainee jockeys at a riding school but failed to settle in either task. He was returned to Terry Cooper's property and was reported in 2017 to be enjoying a "sprightly" retirement. Sergeant Cecil died on 23 June 2024, at the age of 25. Known as "The peoples horse" Sergeant Cecil's ashes were scattered at York Racecourse on 21st August 2026 https://www.instagram.com/p/DcTb8GqM77e/

== Pedigree ==
Pedigree of Sergeant Cecil (GB), chestnut gelding, 1999
Sire King's Signet (USA) 1989	Nureyev; 1977	Northern Dancer (CAN)	Nearctic
Sire King's Signet (USA) 1989	Nureyev; 1977	Northern Dancer (CAN)	Natalma (USA)
Sire King's Signet (USA) 1989	Nureyev; 1977	Special	Forli (ARG)
Sire King's Signet (USA) 1989	Nureyev; 1977	Special	Thong
Sire King's Signet (USA) 1989	Sigy (FR); 1976	Habitat (USA)	Sir Gaylord
Sire King's Signet (USA) 1989	Sigy (FR); 1976	Habitat (USA)	Little Hut
Sire King's Signet (USA) 1989	Sigy (FR); 1976	Satu (GB)	Primera
Sire King's Signet (USA) 1989	Sigy (FR); 1976	Satu (GB)	Creation
Dam Jadidh 1988	Touching Wood (USA); 1979	Roberto	Hail To Reason
Dam Jadidh 1988	Touching Wood (USA); 1979	Roberto	Bramalea
Dam Jadidh 1988	Touching Wood (USA); 1979	Mandera	Vaguely Noble (IRE)
Dam Jadidh 1988	Touching Wood (USA); 1979	Mandera	Foolish One
Dam Jadidh 1988	Petrol; 1981	Troy	Petingo
Dam Jadidh 1988	Petrol; 1981	Troy	La Milo
Dam Jadidh 1988	Petrol; 1981	Rambling Rose	Silly Season (USA)
Dam Jadidh 1988	Petrol; 1981	Rambling Rose	Honeysuckle Rose (Family: 7-a)
