= Goliath Cup Stakes =

Flat horse race in Britain

- Class: Listed
- Location: Musselburgh Racecourse; Musselburgh, Scotland
- Inaugurated: 1993
- Race type: Flat
- Sponsor: VirginBet
- Website: Musselburgh

Race information
- Distance: 1m 5f 216y (2,813m)
- Surface: Turf
- Track: Right-handed
- Qualification: Four-years-old and up
- Weight: 9 st 2 lb Allowances; 5 lb for fillies and mares Penalties; 7 lb for Group 1 or Group 2 winners * 5 lb for Group 3 winners * 3 lb for Listed winners * * after 31 August 2025
- Purse: £80,000 (2026); 1st: £45,368

Further Flight Stakes
2025
| Al Qareem | Divine Comedy | Align The Stars |

Previous years
2023
Rajinsky | Trueshan | Tashkhan
2022
Trueshan | Quickthorn | Eileendover
2021
Sir Ron Priestley | Ocean Wind | Raymond Tusk

2020-2011
2020
Withhold | Dubious Affair | Vivid Diamond
2019
Elegiac | Amazing Red | Pilaster
2018
Mount Moriah | On To Victory | Clever Cookie
2017
Elidor | Wall of Fire | Moonrise Landing
2016
Frosty Berry | Clever Cookie | Seismos
2015
Deuce Again | Island Remede | Forever Now
2014
Flying Officer | Earth Amber | High Jinx
2013
Testosterone | Earth Amber | Handazan
2012
Electrolyser | Zuider Zee | Dandino
2011
The Betchworth Kid | Free Agent | Askar Tau

2010-2001
2010
Opinion Poll | Montaff | Halla San
2009
Fiulin | The Betchworth Kid | Presbyterian Nun
2008
Gull Wing | Shipmaster | Spanish Hidalgo
2007
Mount Kilimanjaro | The Last Drop | Under The Rainbow
2006
Frank Sonata | Dancing Bay | Shabernak
2005
Winged d'Argent | Frank Sonata | Coventina
2004
Alcazar | Dusky Warbler | Hilbre Island
2003
Alcazar | Darasim | Dusky Warbler
2002
Hannibal Lad | Bosham Mill | Double Honour
2001
Turtle Valley | Yorkshire | Lunar Lord

2000-1993
1999
Raise A Prince | The Fly | Kahtan
1998
Further Flight | Georgia Venture | The Faraway Tree
1997
Nabhaan | Sheer Danzig | Key To My Heart
1996
Further Flight | Assessor | Source Of Light
1995
Khamaseen | Linpac West | Poltarf
1994
Kassab | Cuff Link | Dover Patrol
1993
Allegan | Castle Courageous | Long Silence

The Goliath Cup Stakes is a Listed flat horse race in Great Britain open to horses aged four years or older. It is run at Musselburgh over a distance of 1 mile 5 furlongs and 216 yards (2,813 metres), and it is scheduled to take place each year in April.

The race was originally run at Nottingham and named after Michelozzo, the 1989 St Leger winner, who made his debut at the course. It was renamed in 1999 to honour Further Flight, a high-class stayer during the 1990s who won this race twice and was trained by Barry Hills. From 2015 to 2025 the race also included Hills' name in its title. It was moved to Musselburgh and given its present title in 2026.

The race was first run in 1993, and has held Listed status since 2003.

== Records ==
Most successful horse (2 wins):

- Further Flight - 1996, 1998
- Alcazar - 2003, 2004
- Al Qareem - 2025, 2026

Leading jockey (2 wins):

- Michael Hills - Further Flight (1996, 1998)
- Micky Fenton - Alcazar (2003, 2004)
- Ryan Moore - Frank Sonata (2006), Testosterone (2013)
- Franny Norton - Elegiac (2019), Sir Ron Priestley (2021)
- Clifford Lee - Al Qareem (2025, 2026)

Leading trainer (3 wins):

- John Dunlop - Kassab (1994), Khamaseen (1995), Mount Kilimanjaro (2007)
- Mark Johnston - Winged d'Argent (2005), Elegiac (2019), Sir Ron Priestley (2021)

== Winners ==
| Year | Winner | Age | Jockey | Trainer | Time |
|---|---|---|---|---|---|
| 1993 | Allegan | 4 | Pat Eddery | Henry Cecil | 3:04.20 |
| 1994 | Kassab | 4 | Willie Carson | John Dunlop | 3:10.90 |
| 1995 | Khamaseen | 4 | Frankie Dettori | John Dunlop | 3:08.50 |
| 1996 | Further Flight | 10 | Michael Hills | Barry Hills | 3:07.30 |
| 1997 | Nabhaan | 4 | Ray Cochrane | David Morley | 3:07.40 |
| 1998 | Further Flight | 12 | Michael Hills | Barry Hills | 3:21.50 |
| 1999 | Raise A Prince | 6 | Neil Callan | Sean Woods | 3:12.20 |
| 2001 | Turtle Valley | 5 | Paul Doe | Simon Dow | 3:27.20 |
| 2002 | Hannibal Lad | 6 | George Baker | Mark Brisbourne | 3:01.00 |
| 2003 | Alcazar | 8 | Micky Fenton | Hughie Morrison | 3:05.74 |
| 2004 | Alcazar | 9 | Micky Fenton | Hughie Morrison | 3:03.08 |
| 2005 | Winged d'Argent | 4 | Kevin Darley | Mark Johnston | 3:12.13 |
| 2006 | Frank Sonata | 5 | Ryan Moore | Mick Quinlan | 3:12.80 |
| 2007 | Mount Kilimanjaro | 4 | Jimmy Fortune | John Dunlop | 3:07.35 |
| 2008 | Gull Wing | 4 | Richard Mullen | Michael Bell | 3:12.65 |
| 2009 | Fiulin | 4 | John Egan | Marco Botti | 3:00.08 |
| 2010 | Opinion Poll | 4 | Frankie Dettori | Michael Jarvis | 3:16.97 |
| 2011 | The Betchworth Kid | 6 | Hayley Turner | Alan King | 3:01.91 |
| 2012 | Electrolyser | 7 | Adam Kirby | Clive Cox | 3:07.61 |
| 2013 | Testosterone | 5 | Ryan Moore | Ed Dunlop | 3:05.90 |
| 2014 | Flying Officer | 4 | William Buick | John Gosden | 3:09.00 |
| 2015 | Deuce Again | 4 | Robert Havlin | John Gosden | 3:10.44 |
| 2016 | Frosty Berry | 7 | Shane Grey | Ed de Giles | 3:31.53 |
| 2017 | Elidor | 7 | Silvestre de Sousa | Mick Channon | 3:07.24 |
| 2018 | Mount Moriah | 4 | Harry Bentley | Ralph Beckett | 3:05.21 |
| 2019 | Elegiac | 4 | Franny Norton | Mark Johnston | 3:01.58 |
| 2020 (Note: The 2020 race was run at Newmarket in August due to the COVID-19 pandemic in the United Kingdom) | Withhold | 7 | Oisin Murphy | Roger Charlton | 2:53.40 |
| 2021 | Sir Ron Priestley | 5 | Franny Norton | Mark Johnston | 2:58.42 |
| 2022 | Trueshan | 6 | Hollie Doyle | Alan King | 3:05.93 |
| 2023 | Rajinsky | 7 | Harry Davies | Hugo Palmer | 3:22.90 |
| 2024 | Abandoned due to waterlogging |
| 2025 | Al Qareem | 6 | Clifford Lee | Karl Burke | 3:00.60 |
| 2026 | Al Qareem | 7 | Clifford Lee | Karl Burke | 3:03.53 |

== See also ==
- Horse racing in Great Britain
- List of British flat horse races
