= Trueshan =

French-bred Thoroughbred racehorse

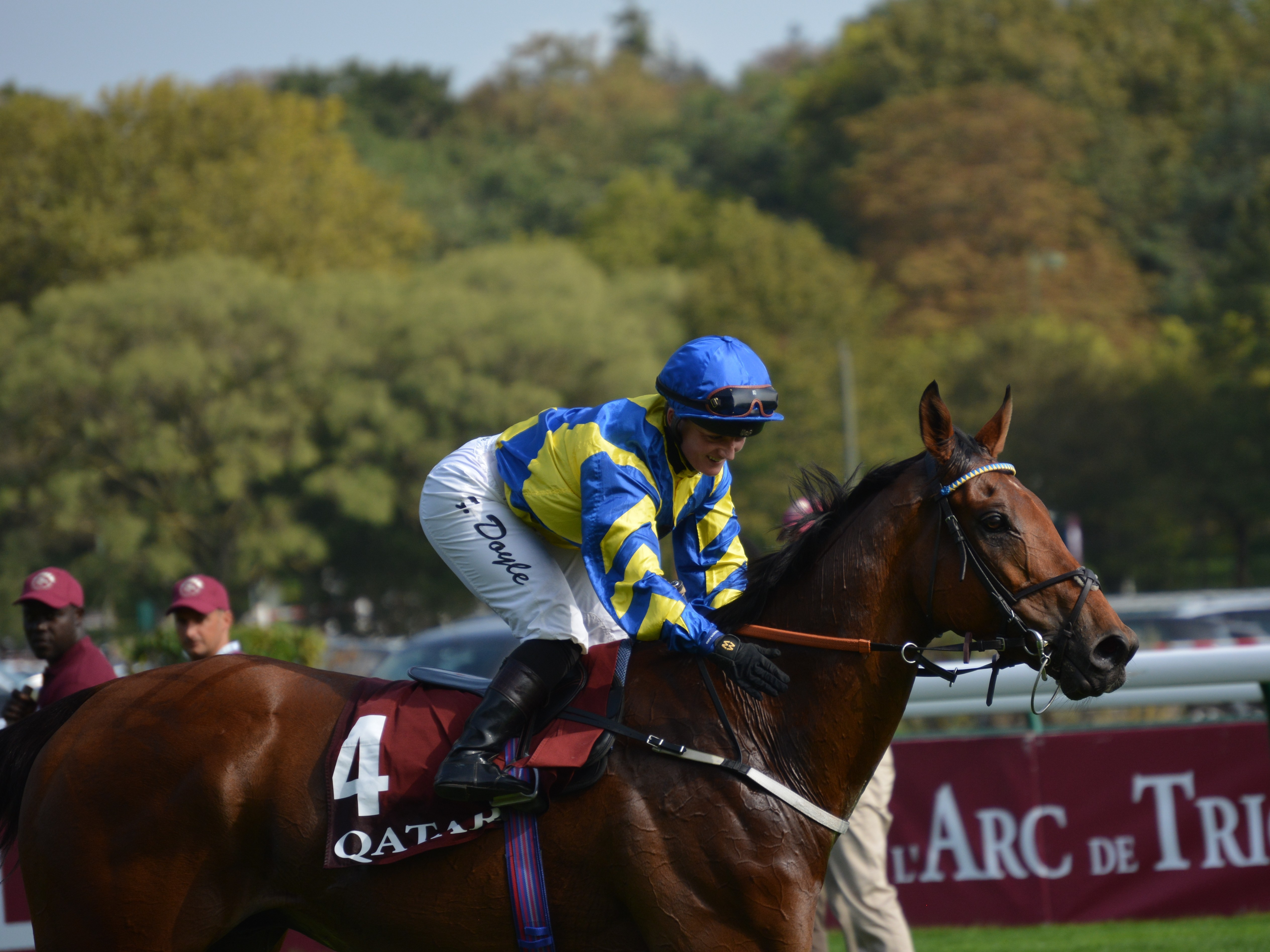
- Trueshan wins the Prix du Cadran 2023
- Sire: Planteur
- Grandsire: Danehill Dancer
- Dam: Shao Line
- Damsire: General Holme
- Sex: Gelding
- Foaled: 24 February 2016
- Died: 29 July 2025
- Country: France
- Colour: Bay
- Breeder: Didier Blot
- Owner: Singula Partnership
- Trainer: Alan King
- Record: 35: 16-6-3
- Earnings: £2,035,217

Major wins
- Tapster Stakes (2020); British Champions Long Distance Cup (2020, 2021, 2022); Goodwood Cup (2021); Prix du Cadran (2021, 2023); Barry Hills Further Flight Stakes (2022); Northumberland Plate (2022); Doncaster Cup (2023); Esher Stakes (2024)

Awards
- Cartier Champion Stayer (2021)

Trueshan (24 February 2016 – 29 July 2025) was a French-bred, British-trained Thoroughbred racehorse who specialised in races over extended distances. He finished unplaced in his only race as a two-year-old in 2018 but won four of his five starts in the following year and made further improvement as a four-year-old when he took the Listed Tapster Stakes and the Group 2 British Champions Long Distance Cup. In 2021 he recorded Group 1 victories in the Goodwood Cup and Prix du Cadran as well as a second British Champions Long Distance Cup. The following season as a six-year-old he won the Northumberland Plate and achieved a third consecutive victory in the British Champions Long Distance Cup. In 2023 he was successful in the Doncaster Cup and the Prix du Cadran, and in 2025 won the Esher Stakes. Still racing as a nine-year-old, he fractured a pastern during the 2025 Goodwood Cup and was euthanised.

== Background ==
Trueshan was a bay horse with a small white star bred in France by Didier Blot. As a yearling in 2017 he was consigned to the Osarus September Yearling Sale and was bought for €8,000 by Pegasus Bloodstock. In May 2018 he was put up for auction at the Tattersalls Guineas Breeze-Up Sale and was purchased for 31,000 guineas by the trainer Alan King and Highflyer Bloodstock. He was taken into training by King at Barbury Castle, Wiltshire and raced in the ownership of Singula Partnership. He was gelded before the start of his racing career.

He was from the second crop of foals sired by Planteur who won the Prix Ganay in 2011. Trueshan's dam Shao Line showed modest ability on the track, winning one minor race in France from six attempts. As a descendant of the Poule d'Essai des Pouliches winner Altissima she was distantly related to Cape Verdi, Arcangues, Aquarelliste and Tawkeel.

== Racing career ==
=== 2018: two-year-old season ===
On his racecourse debut Trueshan started at odds of 20/1 for a maiden race over eight and a half furlongs on soft ground at Nottingham Racecourse on 17 October when he came home sixth of the nine runners behind Dubai Icon, beaten seven and three quarter lengths by the winner.

=== 2019: three-year-old season ===
After an absence of over nine months, Trueshan began his second campaign in a novice race (for horses with no more than two previous wins) over one and a half miles on the synthetic Tapeta at Wolverhampton Racecourse on 2 August. Ridden by Hollie Doyle he went off a 33/1 outsider but overcame a slow start to record his first victory as he caught Caravan of Hope on the line to win by a short head. Doyle was again in the saddle when Trueshan followed up in a similar event on turf at Ffos Las Racecourse, winning "comfortably" by two and three quarter lengths from Caravan of Hope. He was then moved up in distance for a Handicap race over fourteen furlongs at Haydock Park on 7 September and finished second of the twelve runners behind Ranch Hand. On 11 October Trueshan was assigned a weight of 126 pounds for the Old Rowley Cup Handicap over one and half miles at Newmarket Racecourse when he was ridden by William Buick. He started the 13/2 favourite in a nineteen-runner field and won "readily" by almost four lengths after taking the lead approaching the final furlong. On his final run of the season Trueshan, ridden by Buick, won a conditions race at Newbury Racecourse two weeks later, getting the better of a sustained struggle with the odds-on favourite Hamish to prevail by a neck.

=== 2020: four-year-old season ===
The 2020 flat racing season in Britain was disrupted by the COVID-19 pandemic with racing being suspended in spring before resuming in June. On his seasonal debut, Trueshan was moved up in class for the Listed Buckhounds Stakes, which was run that year at Newmarket on 7 June, and came home fourth of the ten runners, beaten just over three lengths by the winner Dashing Willoughby. Ten days later the gelding was ridden by Martin Harley when he went off the 5/4 favourite for the Listed Tapster Stakes over one and a half miles at Haydock. After being restrained towards the rear of the seven-runner field he moved up to dispute the lead in the straight and got the better of a "sustained duel" with the Michael Stoute-trained Alignak to win by a short head. At York Racecourse in August Trueshan was assigned a weight of 135 pounds for the Ebor Handicap and finished eighth behind the six-year-old Fujaira Prince after struggling to obtain a clear run in the straight. The gelding returned to winning form at Salisbury Racecourse on 11 September as he defeated Withhold by a length in the Persian Punch Stakes over fourteen furlongs after taking the lead a furlong from the finish.

Hollie Doyle resumed her partnership with Trueshan when the gelding was stepped up to Group 2 class to contest the British Champions Long Distance Cup over two miles on soft ground at Ascot Racecourse on 17 October and started at odds of 11/1. Stradivarius started favourite while the other eleven runners included Search For A Song, Sovereign, Fujaira Prince and Broome. After racing in mid-division for most of the way Trueshan made a forward move entering the straight, gained the advantage a furlong out and drew right away in the closing stages to win "easily" by seven and a half lengths from Search For A Song. Alan King commented "We'd hope he would run well but we weren't expecting something like that... but obviously the step up in trip suited him and we know he does handle that ground... We'll put him away for the winter now and look forward to next summer", while Hollie Doyle said "The further I was going, the better, and he was tanking with me—he went through the ground like a tractor, he loved it."

In the 2020 World's Best Racehorse Rankings, Trueshan was rated on 118, making him the 80th best racehorse in the world and the second best horse over extended distances.

=== 2021: five-year-old season ===
Trueshan began his fourth season in the Group 3 Ormonde Stakes over thirteen furlongs at Chester Racecourse on 6 May and finished second to the Aidan O'Brien-trained favourite Japan, beaten three-quarters of a length by the winner. In June he was expected to contest the Ascot Gold Cup but bypassed the race as King felt that the ground would have been too firm, and was instead dropped back to handicap class for the Northumberland Plate at Newcastle Racecourse. Carrying top weight of 139 pounds and ridden by the apprentice jockey Rhys Clutterbuck he started favourite but came home sixth of the twenty runners behind the 33/1 outsider Nicholas T.

Trueshan made his first appearance in a Group 1 race when he was partnered by Doyle in the Goodwood Cup over two miles at Goodwood Racecourse on 27 July. With Stradivarius being withdrawn on account of the soft ground Trueshan started the 6/5 favourite in an eight-runner field which included Serpentine, Santiago, Sir Ron Priestley (Princess of Wales's Stakes), Amhran Na Bhfiann (Curragh Cup). After tracking the leader Nayef Road, Trueshan took the lead in the straight as the field tracked over to race up the stands side (the left side from the jockeys' viewpoint). He "kept on strongly" in the closing stages and won by almost four lengths from the outsider Away He Goes, with Sir Ron Priestley a further length and a half back in third place. After the race Doyle said "I was very confident... he's exceptionally talented on this ground. There was no gallop and I expected a bit of pace so halfway round I thought, 'I'm going to do something about this', as I didn't want to get caught on the rail – he just went when he hit the rising ground."

After a break of more than two months Trueshan was sent to France to contest the Group 1 Prix du Cadran over 4000 metres at Longchamp Racecourse on 2 October. Ridden by James Doyle (Hollie Doyle was serving a suspension) he went off the 1.6/1 favourite against twelve opponents including Stradivarius, Princess Zoe, Skazino (Prix Kergorlay), Call The Wind (winner of the race in 2018) and Bubble Smart (Prix Gladiateur). In a race run in heavy rain Trueshan settled in mid-division as the outsider Alkuin set the pace from Bubble Smart, before moving into contention approaching the final turn. He gained the advantage from Stradivarius 400 metres from the finish and drew away in the closing stages to win by four and a half lengths. James Doyle commented "He stays all day and has a good kick on this ground as well... Hollie has been a big part of this horse's career and to miss out today through suspension is pretty tough."

Two weeks later at Ascot, with Hollie Doyle back in the saddle, Trueshan attempted to repeat his 2020 success in the British Champions Long Distance Cup and started even money favourite in a ten-runner field. Stradivarius was again in opposition while the best fancied of the other contenders were Hamish (who had returned from a long absence to win the September Stakes) and Baron Samedi (Belmont Gold Cup Stakes). After tracking the leaders he moved up on the outside on the final turn, overtook the front-running The Mediterranean two furlongs out and held off a sustained challenge from the outsider Tashkhan to win by one and a half lengths, with a further two and a half lengths back to Stradivarius in third. Alan King commented "He was quite a handful to saddle and quite hot. I don't think he was at his best but I think we got away with it today, but only just. He had to be very brave today."

On 10 November Trueshan was named Champion Stayer at the Cartier Racing Awards.

=== 2022: six-year-old season ===
Trueshan started the season in April with a win over fourteen furlongs in the Barry Hills Further Flight Stakes at Nottingham. After a break of 80 days he then won the Northumberland Plate at Newcastle, starting as favourite in a field of twenty. A month later he was beaten into third place by Kyprios in the Goodwood Cup. He started odds-on favourite in the Doncaster Cup in September but was narrowly beaten by Coltrane. The season finished with a repeat of his 2020 and 2021 victories in the British Champions Long Distance Cup, beating Coltrane by a head.

=== 2023: seven-year-old season ===
Trueshan again started his campaign in the Barry Hills Further Flight Stakes, where he was narrowly beaten by Rajinsky. In May he started favourite in the Sagaro Stakes at Ascot and finished fourth, seven lengths behind Coltrane. Later that month he underwent wind surgery and did not return to the racecourse until September, winning the Doncaster Cup in spite of pulling hard in the early stages of the race. Fifteen days later he was at Longchamp, attempting a second victory in the Prix du Cadran, this time ridden by Hollie Doyle. Starting at 9/10 favourite in a field of six, he led throughout the race and won by four lengths from outsider Moon Wolf. After the race Doyle said "I was a little worried about the ground, but he got into a beautiful rhythm.... I was disappointed at Doncaster, to be honest. I didn’t get a sense of happiness like I had today because to me he did it the wrong way round at Doncaster, whereas today he was foot perfect."

=== 2024: eight-year-old season ===
After undergoing wind surgery for a second time in March 2024, Trueshan raced seven times during the season. His only victory was in the Listed Esher Stakes at Sandown. He then came fourth behind Kyprios in the Goodwood Cup and second behind Sweet William in the Doncaster Cup. In October, he raced twice in France. He was ridden by James Doyle inn the Prix du Cadran as his regular jockey Hollie Doyle was riding for her retained owner in Newmarket. They finished second, beaten two lengths by Kyprios. Three weeks later, with Hollie Doyle back onboard, he finished third in the Prix Royal-Oak.

=== 2025: nine-year-old season and death ===
Trueshan started the season in May with another trip to France, to run in the newly-upgraded Group 1 Prix Vicomtesse Vigier at Longchamp. With Hollie Doyle committed to riding Duty First in the Irish 1,000 Guineas, James Doyle again took the ride, finishing fourth in a field of nine. He was reunited with Hollie Doyle for his next run, which was his fourth run in the Goodwood Cup. Pulled up during the race, he was found to have fractured his left hind pastern and his trainer made the decision to have him euthanised. In a career spanning eight seasons, he had won 16 of his 35 starts, earning over £2 million for his owners.

== Pedigree ==
Pedigree of Trueshan (FR), bay gelding, 2016
Sire Planteur (IRE) 2009	Danehill Dancer (IRE); 1993	Danehill (USA)	Danzig
Sire Planteur (IRE) 2009	Danehill Dancer (IRE); 1993	Danehill (USA)	Razyana
Sire Planteur (IRE) 2009	Danehill Dancer (IRE); 1993	Mira Adonde (USA)	Sharpen Up (GB)
Sire Planteur (IRE) 2009	Danehill Dancer (IRE); 1993	Mira Adonde (USA)	Lettre d'Amour
Sire Planteur (IRE) 2009	Plante Rare (IRE); 2002	Giant's Causeway (USA)	Storm Cat
Sire Planteur (IRE) 2009	Plante Rare (IRE); 2002	Giant's Causeway (USA)	Mariah's Storm
Sire Planteur (IRE) 2009	Plante Rare (IRE); 2002	Palmaraie (USA)	Lear Fan
Sire Planteur (IRE) 2009	Plante Rare (IRE); 2002	Palmaraie (USA)	Petroleuse (IRE)
Dam Shao Line (FR) 1998	General Holme (USA); 1979	Noholme (AUS)	Star Kingdom (IRE)
Dam Shao Line (FR) 1998	General Holme (USA); 1979	Noholme (AUS)	Oceana (IRE)
Dam Shao Line (FR) 1998	General Holme (USA); 1979	General's Sister	Count Fleet
Dam Shao Line (FR) 1998	General Holme (USA); 1979	General's Sister	Cigar Maid
Dam Shao Line (FR) 1998	Marie d'Altoria (FR); 1993	Roi du Rome (USA)	Time For A Change
Dam Shao Line (FR) 1998	Marie d'Altoria (FR); 1993	Roi du Rome (USA)	Reve de Reine
Dam Shao Line (FR) 1998	Marie d'Altoria (FR); 1993	Marie de l'Empire	Faristan (GB)
Dam Shao Line (FR) 1998	Marie d'Altoria (FR); 1993	Marie de l'Empire	Herbissima (GB) (Family: 8-f)
