= British Champions Long Distance Cup =

Flat horse race in Britain

British Champions Long Distance Cup (ex Jockey Club Cup)
- Class: Group 1
- Location: Ascot Racecourse; Ascot, England
- Inaugurated: 1873
- Race type: Flat / Thoroughbred
- Sponsor: QIPCO
- Website: Ascot

Race information
- Distance: 1m 7f 209y (3,209 metres)
- Surface: Turf
- Track: Right-handed
- Qualification: Three-years-old and up
- Weight: 9 st 2 lb (3yo); 9 st 9 lb (4yo+); Allowances; 3 lb for fillies and mares
- Purse: £531,250 (2025); 1st: £301,272

British Champions Long Distance Cup
2026
| Mount Atlas | Queenstown | Highwayman |

Previous years
2025
Trawlerman | Sweet William | Al Qareem
2024
Kyprios | Sweet William | Trawlerman
2023
Trawlerman | Kyprios | Sweet William
2022
Trueshan | Coltrane | Trawlerman
2021
Trueshan | Tashkhan | Stradivarius

2020-2011
2020
Trueshan | Search For A Song | Fujaira Prince
2019
Kew Gardens | Stradivarius | Royal Line
2018
Stradivarius | Thomas Hobson | Sir Erec
2017
Order Of St George | Torcedor | Stradivarius
2016
Sheikhzayedroad | Quest For More | Simple Verse
2015
Flying Officer | Clever Cookie | Wicklow Brave
2014
Forgotten Rules | Biographer | Pallasator
2013
Royal Diamond | Harris Tweed | Eye of The Storm
2012
Rite Of Passage | Aiken | Askar Tau
2011
Fame And Glory | Opinion Poll | Colour Vision

2010-2001
2010
Tastahil | Motrice | Buxted
2009
Akmal | Nehaam | Above Average
2008
Veracity | Sagara | Fiulin
2007
Royal And Regal | Balkan Knight | Veenwouden
2006
Hawridge Prince | Bulwark | Balkan Knight
2005
Cover Up | Tungsten Strike | Millenary
2004
Millenary | Franklins Gardens | True Lover
2003
Persian Punch | Millenary | Kasthari
2002
Persian Punch | Boreas | Spanish John
2001
Capal Garmon | Invermark | Royal Rebel

2000-1991
2000
Persian Punch | Royal Rebel | Rainbow High
1999
Rainbow High | Arctic Owl | Celeric
1998
Arctic Owl | Celeric | Samraan
1997
Grey Shot | Double Eclipse | Further Flight
1996
Celeric | Sanmartino | Persian Punch
1995
Further Flight | Assessor | Double Eclipse
1994
Further Flight | Capias | Tethys
1993
Further Flight | Edbaysaan | Zinaad
1992
Further Flight | Supreme Choice | Shambo
1991
Further Flight | Supreme Choice | Shambo

1990-1988
1990
Great Marquess | Dance Spectrum | Ashal
1989
Weld | Sapience | Sergeyevich
1988
Kneller | Raslaan | Mr Pintips

The British Champions Long Distance Cup is a Group 1 flat horse race in Great Britain open to thoroughbreds aged three years or older. It is run at Ascot over a distance of 1 mile 7 furlongs and 209 yards (3,209 metres), and it is scheduled to take place as part of British Champions Day each year in October.

== History ==
The event was originally held at Newmarket under the title Jockey Club Cup. It was established in 1873, and was initially contested over 2¼ miles.

The distance of the race was shortened to 1½ miles in 1959. It was extended to its current length in 1963. The event was given Group 3 status in 1971.

For a period the Jockey Club Cup was staged during Newmarket's Cambridgeshire Meeting. It was switched to the venue's Champions Day fixture in 2000. It had a prize fund of £65,000 in 2010.

The race was transferred to Ascot and given its present name in 2011. It became part of the newly created British Champions Day, and its purse was increased to £200,000. It now serves as the long-distance final of the British Champions Series and was upgraded from Group 3 to Group 2 from its 2014 running. In 2025 the race was promoted to Group 1 status.

== Records ==
Most successful horse (5 wins):

- Further Flight – 1991, 1992, 1993, 1994, 1995

Leading jockey (7 wins):

- Sir Gordon Richards – Brumeux (1930), Brulette (1932), Felicitation (1934), Foxglove II (1938), Shahpoor (1943), Vic Day (1948, 1949)

Leading trainer (7 wins):

- Barry Hills – Further Flight (1991, 1992, 1993, 1994, 1995), Rainbow High (1999), Tastahil (2010)

== Winners since 1900 ==
| Year | Winner | Age | Jockey | Trainer | Time |
|---|---|---|---|---|---|
| 1900 | Osbech | 5 | Fred Rickaby | Percy Peck | |
| 1901 | King's Courier | 4 | Danny Maher | Richard Dawson | 4:16.00 |
| 1902 | Black Sand | 5 | William Lane | Luis Alvarez | |
| 1903 | Mead | 3 | | Richard Marsh | |
| 1904 | Zinfandel | 4 | Mornington Cannon | Charles Beatty | |
| 1905 | Pretty Polly | 4 | Bernard Dillon | Peter Gilpin | |
| 1906 | Batchelor's Button | 7 | Danny Maher | Charles Peck | |
| 1907 | Radium | 4 | Barry Lynham | John Watson | |
| 1908 | Radium | 5 | Otto Madden | John Watson | |
| 1909 | Amadis | 3 | Otto Madden | Willie Waugh | |
| 1910 | Lagos | 5 | Danny Maher | Samuel Pickering | |
| 1911 | Willonyx | 4 | Billy Higgs | Sam Darling | 4:10.00 |
| 1912 | Aleppo | 3 | Albert Whalley | Alec Taylor Jr. | 4:11.00 |
| 1913 | Aleppo | 4 | Albert Whalley | Alec Taylor Jr. | |
| 1914 | Son-in-Law | 3 | Frank Bullock | Reg Day | |
| 1915 | Son-in-Law | 4 | Frank Bullock | Reg Day | 3:57.20 |
| 1916 | Hurry On | 3 | Joe Childs | Fred Darling | |
| 1917 | Brown Prince | 3 | Freddie Fox | Reg Day | |
| 1918 | Queen's Square | 3 | Steve Donoghue | Alec Taylor Jr. | |
| 1919 | Gay Lord | 3 | Albert Whalley | Harry Cottrill | |
| 1920 | No Race | | | | |
| 1921 | Nippon | 3 | Freddie Fox | Basil Jarvis | 3:59.60 |
| 1922 | Bucks Hussar | 3 | William Lister | Reg Day | 4:01.80 |
| 1923 | Tranquil | 3 | Tommy Weston | George Lambton | 4:15.00 |
| 1924 | Plack | 3 | Charlie Smirke | Jack Jarvis | 4:17.80 |
| 1925 | Bucellas | 3 | Albert Orme | Basil Jarvis | 4:05.00 |
| 1926 | Bongrace | 3 | Tommy Weston | Jack Jarvis | 4:14.00 |
| 1927 | Mont Bernina | 4 | Charles Bouillon | Barker | 3:55.00 |
| 1928 | Invershin | 6 | Bernard Carslake | George Digby | 4:10.00 |
| 1929 | Fairway | 4 | Tommy Weston | Frank Butters | |
| 1930 | Brumeux | 5 | Sir Gordon Richards | Sam Darling | 4:26.60 |
| 1931 | Noble Star | 4 | Freddie Fox | Len Cundell | 3:53.80 |
| 1932 | Brulette | 4 | Sir Gordon Richards | Fred Darling | walk over |
| 1933 | Nitsichin | 5 | Harry Wragg | Peter Thrale | 4:02.60 |
| 1934 | Felicitation | 4 | Sir Gordon Richards | Frank Butters | 3:49.60 |
| 1935 | Quashed | 3 | Tommy Weston | Colledge Leader | 4:00.40 |
| 1936 | Quashed | 4 | Richard Perryman | Colledge Leader | 3:56.00 |
| 1937 | Buckleigh | 5 | Bernard Carslake | Tommy Hogg | 3:56.40 |
| 1938 | Foxglove II | 3 | Sir Gordon Richards | Fred Darling | 4:05.20 |
| 1939 | No Race | | | | |
| 1940 (Note: The 1940 running took place at Nottingham over 2 miles and 4 furlongs) | Atout Maitre | 4 | Charlie Elliott | Herbert Blagrave | 4:36.20 |
| 1941 | No Race | | | | |
| 1942 | Afterthought | 3 | Eph Smith | Jack Jarvis | 3:54.60 |
| 1943 | Shahpoor | 4 | Sir Gordon Richards | Joseph Lawson | 4:00.60 |
| 1944 | Ocean Swell | 3 | Eph Smith | Jack Jarvis | 4:03.20 |
| 1945 | Amber Flash | 3 | Cliff Richards | Jack Colling | 4:07.00 |
| 1946 | Felix II | 3 | Percy Evans | Claude Halsey | 4:02.40 |
| 1947 | Laurentis | 4 | Edgar Britt | Gordon Johnson Houghton | 4:06.00 |
| 1948 | Vic Day | 3 | Sir Gordon Richards | Herbert Blagrave | walk over |
| 1949 | Vic Day | 4 | Sir Gordon Richards | Herbert Blagrave | 4:09.00 |
| 1950 | Colonist II | 4 | Tommy Gosling | Walter Nightingall | 4:06.60 |
| 1951 | Eastern Emperor | 3 | Bill Rickaby | Jack Jarvis | 4:02.20 |
| 1952 | Blarney Stone | 3 | Bill Rickaby | Vic Smyth | 4:03.48 |
| 1953 | Ambiguity | 3 | Joe Mercer | Jack Colling | 4:02.12 |
| 1954 | Yorick II | 3 | Paul Blanc | Geoff Watson | 4:02.45 |
| 1955 | Romany Air | 4 | Bill Rickaby | Reg Day | 4:13.02 |
| 1956 | Donald | 3 | Bill Rickaby | Jack Jarvis | 4:09.03 |
| 1957 | Flying Flag II | 4 | Freddie Palmer | Jean Laumain | 4:31.08 |
| 1958 | French Biege | 5 | Geoff Littlewood | Harry Peacock | 4:07.26 |
| 1959 | Vacarme | 5 | Scobie Breasley | Norman Bertie | 2:40.08 |
| 1960 | Parthia | 4 | Harry Carr | Cecil Boyd-Rochfort | 2:39.36 |
| 1961 | Apostle | 4 | Eddie Hide | Staff Ingham | 2:46.86 |
| 1962 | Pardao | 4 | Harry Carr | Cecil Boyd-Rochfort | 2:38.66 |
| 1963 | Gaul | 4 | Geoff Lewis | Peter Hastings-Bass | 3:44.41 |
| 1964 | Oncidium | 3 | Scobie Breasley | George Todd | 3:37.87 |
| 1965 | Goupi | 3 | Geoff Lewis | Staff Ingham | 3:32.94 |
| 1966 | Hermes | 3 | Greville Starkey | John Oxley | 3:37.16 |
| 1967 | Dancing Moss | 3 | Geoff Lewis | Brud Fetherstonhaugh | 3:31.45 |
| 1968 | Riboccare | 3 | Lester Piggott | Jeremy Tree | 3:35.40 |
| 1969 | High Line | 3 | Joe Mercer | Derrick Candy | 3:41.53 |
| 1970 | High Line | 4 | Joe Mercer | Derrick Candy | 3:47.74 |
| 1971 | High Line | 5 | Joe Mercer | Derrick Candy | 3:35.59 |
| 1972 | Irvine | 4 | Lester Piggott | Henry Cecil | 3:51.68 |
| 1973 | Parnell | 5 | Willie Carson | Bernard van Cutsem | 3:39.77 |
| 1974 | Petty Officer | 7 | Eddie Hide | Arthur Budgett | 3:38.60 |
| 1975 | Blood Royal | 4 | Lester Piggott | Vincent O'Brien | 3:25.73 |
| 1976 | Bright Finish | 3 | Lester Piggott | Michael Stoute | 3:38.73 |
| 1977 | Grey Baron | 4 | Geoff Baxter | Bruce Hobbs | 3:28.04 |
| 1978 | Buckskin | 5 | Joe Mercer | Henry Cecil | 3:28.44 |
| 1979 | Nicholas Bill | 4 | Philip Waldron | Henry Candy | 3:30.10 |
| 1980 | Ardross | 4 | Lester Piggott | Kevin Prendergast | 3:40.52 |
| 1981 | Centroline | 3 | Philip Waldron | Henry Candy | 3:29.62 |
| 1982 | Little Wolf | 4 | Willie Carson | Dick Hern | 3:33.89 |
| 1983 | Karadar | 5 | Walter Swinburn | Michael Stoute | 3:29.63 |
| 1984 | Old Country | 5 | Darrel McHargue | Luca Cumani | 3:36.25 |
| 1985 | Tale Quale | 3 | Tony Ives | Henry Candy | 3:24.62 |
| 1986 | Valuable Witness | 6 | Pat Eddery | Jeremy Tree | 3:24.16 |
| 1987 | Buckley | 4 | Ray Cochrane | Luca Cumani | 3:27.73 |
| 1988 | Kneller | 3 | Pat Eddery | Henry Cecil | 3:28.39 |
| 1989 | Weld | 3 | Bruce Raymond | William Jarvis | 3:34.82 |
| 1990 | Great Marquess | 3 | Frankie Dettori | Henry Cecil | 3:21.52 |
| 1991 | Further Flight | 5 | Michael Hills | Barry Hills | 3:23.29 |
| 1992 | Further Flight | 6 | Michael Hills | Barry Hills | 3:38.91 |
| 1993 | Further Flight | 7 | Michael Hills | Barry Hills | 3:31.97 |
| 1994 | Further Flight | 8 | Michael Hills | Barry Hills | 3:28.35 |
| 1995 | Further Flight | 9 | Michael Hills | Barry Hills | 3:28.14 |
| 1996 | Celeric | 4 | Richard Hills | David Morley | 3:21.91 |
| 1997 | Grey Shot | 5 | Richard Quinn | Ian Balding | 3:19.51 |
| 1998 | Arctic Owl | 4 | Ray Cochrane | James Fanshawe | 3:23.78 |
| 1999 (Note: The 1999 edition was held on Newmarket's July Course over 2 miles and 24 yards) | Rainbow High | 4 | Michael Hills | Barry Hills | 3:38.35 |
| 2000 | Persian Punch | 7 | Richard Hughes | David Elsworth | 3:25.72 |
| 2001 | Capal Garmon | 3 | Kevin Darley | John Gosden | 3:36.44 |
| 2002 | Persian Punch | 9 | Martin Dwyer | David Elsworth | 3:21.11 |
| 2003 | Persian Punch | 10 | Martin Dwyer | David Elsworth | 3:26.92 |
| 2004 | Millenary | 7 | Richard Quinn | John Dunlop | 3:32.10 |
| 2005 | Cover Up | 8 | Kieren Fallon | Sir Michael Stoute | 3:26.79 |
| 2006 | Hawridge Prince | 6 | Jim Crowley | Rod Millman | 3:31.21 |
| 2007 | Royal and Regal | 3 | Stéphane Pasquier | André Fabre | 3:30.52 |
| 2008 | Veracity | 4 | Frankie Dettori | Saeed bin Suroor | 3:28.94 |
| 2009 | Akmal | 3 | Richard Hills | John Dunlop | 3:31.90 |
| 2010 | Tastahil | 6 | William Buick | Barry Hills | 3:29.90 |
| 2011 | Fame and Glory | 5 | Jamie Spencer | Aidan O'Brien | 3:26.50 |
| 2012 | Rite Of Passage | 8 | Pat Smullen | Dermot Weld | 3:35.98 |
| 2013 | Royal Diamond | 7 | Johnny Murtagh | Johnny Murtagh | 3:38.09 |
| 2014 | Forgotten Rules | 4 | Pat Smullen | Dermot Weld | 3:36.77 |
| 2015 | Flying Officer | 5 | Frankie Dettori | John Gosden | 3:32.19 |
| 2016 | Sheikhzayedroad | 7 | Martin Harley | David Simcock | 3:31.52 |
| 2017 | Order of St George | 5 | Ryan Moore | Aidan O'Brien | 3:37.84 |
| 2018 | Stradivarius | 4 | Frankie Dettori | John Gosden | 3:37.51 |
| 2019 (Note: The 2019, 2023 and 2024 editions were held on Ascot's inner course over 1 mile, 7 furlongs and 127 yards) | Kew Gardens | 4 | Donnacha O'Brien | Aidan O'Brien | 3:29.49 |
| 2020 | Trueshan | 4 | Hollie Doyle | Alan King | 3:35.75 |
| 2021 | Trueshan | 5 | Hollie Doyle | Alan King | 3:30.68 |
| 2022 | Trueshan | 6 | Hollie Doyle | Alan King | 3:30.22 |
| 2023 | Trawlerman | 5 | Frankie Dettori | John & Thady Gosden | 3:22.14 |
| 2024 | Kyprios | 6 | Ryan Moore | Aidan O'Brien | 3:25.91 |
| 2025 | Trawlerman | 7 | William Buick | John & Thady Gosden | 3:22.29 |
| 2026 | Mount Atlas | 5 | P. J. McDonald | Andrew Balding | 3:25.60 |

== Earlier winners ==
- 1873: Flageolet
- 1874: Gang Forward
- 1875: Carnelion
- 1876: Braconnier
- 1877: Verneuil
- 1878: Silvio
- 1879: Jannette
- 1880: Chippendale
- 1881: Corrie Roy
- 1882: Chippendale
- 1883: Ladislas
- 1884: St Gatien
- 1885: St Gatien
- 1886: St Gatien
- 1887: Carlton
- 1888: Reve d'Or
- 1889: Sheen
- 1890: Wild Monk
- 1891: Patrick Blue
- 1892: Buccaneer
- 1893: Lady Rosebery
- 1894: Callistrate
- 1895: Florizel II
- 1896: Canterbury Pilgrim
- 1897: Count Schomberg
- 1898: Merman
- 1899: Mazagan

== See also ==
- Horse racing in Great Britain
- List of British flat horse races
- Recurring sporting events established in 1873 – this race is included under its original title, Jockey Club Cup.
