= Northumberland Plate =

Flat horse race in Britain

- Class: Handicap
- Location: Newcastle Racecourse; Newcastle, England
- Inaugurated: 1833
- Race type: Flat / Thoroughbred
- Sponsor: William Hill
- Website: Newcastle

Race information
- Distance: 2m 56y (3,270 metres)
- Surface: Tapeta
- Track: Left-handed
- Qualification: Three-years-old and up
- Weight: Handicap
- Purse: £150,000 (2019); 1st: £92,385

Northumberland Plate
2026
Align The Stars	Kirchner	Synergism

Previous years
2025
Spirit Mixer	Dancing In Paris	Charging Thunder
2024
Onesmoothoperator	Evaluation	Duke Of Oxford
2023
Calling The Wind	Golden Rules	Aztec Empire
2022
Trueshan	Spirit Mixer	Solent Gateway
2021
Nicholas T	Hochfeld	Rajinsky

2020-2011
2020
Caravan Of Hope	Australis	Collide
2019
Who Dares Wins	Dubawi Fifty	Proschema
2018
Withhold	Prince Of Arran	Sir Chauvelin
2017
Higher Power	Natural Scenery	Flymetothestars
2016
Antiquarium	Seamour	Nearly Caught
2015
Quest For More	Max Dynamite	Nearly Caught
2014
Angel Gabrial	Suegioo	Repeater
2013
Tominator	Oriental Fox	Mubaraza
2012
Ile De Re	Crackentorp	Icon Dream
2011
Tominator	Montaff	Deauville Flyer

2010-2001
2010
Overturn	Drunken Sailor	Desert Sea
2009
Som Tala	Wells Lyrical	Friston Forest
2008
Arc Bleu	Halla San	Bogside Theatre
2007
Juniper Girl	Macorville	Tilt
2006
Toldo	River Alhaarth	Greenwich Meantime
2005
Sergeant Cecil	Tungsten Strike	Far Pavilions
2004
Mirjan	Swing Wing	Anak Pekan
2003
Unleash	Sentinel	Zibeline
2002
Bangalore	Mr Dinos	Zibeline
2001
Archduke Ferdinand	Cover Up	Heros Fatal

2000-1991
2000
Bay Of Islands	Temple Way	Rainbow Ways
1999
Far Cry	Travelmate	Bay Of Islands
1998
Cyrian	Rainbow Frontier	Arctic Owl
1997
Windsor Castle	Sweetness Herself	Onefourseven
1996
Celeric	Snow Princess	Secret Service
1995
Bold Gait	Trans Siberia	George Dillingham
1994
Quick Ransom	Hasten To Add	Tioman Island
1993
Highflying	Balasani	Brandon Prince
1992
Witness Box	Cabochon	Satin Lover
1991
Tamarpour	Aahsaylad	First Victory

1990-1988
1990
Al Maheb	Dance Spectrum	Holy Zeal
1989
Orpheus	Ala Hounak	Misrule
1988
Stavordale	Zero Watt	Private Audition

The Northumberland Plate is a flat handicap horse race in Great Britain open to horses aged three years or older. It is run at Newcastle over a distance of 2 miles and 56 yards (3,270 metres), and it is scheduled to take place each year in late June or early July.

== History ==
The event was established in 1833, and the inaugural running was won by Tomboy. It was initially held at Town Moor, and it was part of a meeting first staged at Killingworth in 1623. It was transferred to its present venue at Gosforth Park in 1882.

The Northumberland Plate originally took place on a Wednesday, and for many years the meeting was a holiday for local mine workers. The race became popularly known as the "Pitmen's Derby". The meeting ceased to be a holiday in 1949, and the race was switched to a Saturday in 1952.

The Northumberland Plate is now one of the richest two-mile handicaps in the world. It was sponsored by John Smith's from 2003 to 2016, by Stobart Rail Limited in 2017 and 2018 and by Betfair since 2019.

Since 2016, it has been run on an artificial all-weather surface, Tapeta, having previously been run on turf.

== Records ==
Most successful horse (3 wins):

- Underhand – 1857, 1858, 1859

Leading jockey since 1900 (3 wins):

- James Ledson – Mynora (1912), The Guller (1914), Carpathus (1923)
- Doug Smith - Doreen Jane (1935), Culrain (1947), Jardiniere (1956)

Leading trainer since 1900 (6 wins):

- Matthew Dobson Peacock – Palmy Days (1904), Sir Harry (1909), Carpathus (1923), Border Minstrel (1927), Primrose League (1928), Pomarrel (1932)

== Winners since 1900 ==
- Weights given in stones and pounds.

Year	Winner	Age	Weight	Jockey	Trainer	SP	Time
	Turf before 2016
1900	Joe Chamberlain	3	8-02	Skeets Martin	Robert Chaloner	8/1	4:38.00
1901	Reminiscence	5	6-01	Harry Aylin	George Lambton	7/2	3:25.20
1902	Osbech	7	6-07	William Halsey	Percy Peck	9/2	3:29.40
1903	Cliftonhall	4			William I'Anson Jr.
1904	Palmy Days	4	7-11	Tristram Heppell	Matthew D Peacock	3/1
1905	Princess Florizel	4	6-07	William Saxby	George Lambton	9/4 F	3:25.20
1906	Outbreak	4	8-00	Spink Walkington	Robert Colling	Evens F	3:29.40
1907	Killigrew	6	6-07	Charles Ringstead	Matthews	100/8	3:33.80
1908	Old China	4	8-02	George McCall	James Fagan	10/1
1909	Sir Harry	4	8-07	Otto Madden	Matthew D Peacock	5/2 F	3:33.80
1910	Elizabetta	4	7-11	Stanley Wootton	Alec Taylor Jr.	9/2
1911	Pillo	6	8-07	William Saxby	Jack Robinson	8/1
1912	Mynora	6	6-06	James Ledson	John Osborne	20/1	3:41.80
1913	The Tylt	4	7-13	Fred Rickaby	George Lambton	9/1
1914	The Guller	5	8-00	James Ledson	John Osborne	9/2
1915-18	no race
1919	Trestle	4	6-13	George Colling	George Lambton	6/1
1920	Irish Lake	4	7-07	Peter Jones	Robert Colling	7/2 F	3:30.40
1921	Hunt Law	4	8-04	Herbert Jones	Percy Bewicke	5/1
1922	Double Hackle	4	8-04	Herbert Robbins	Joe Cannon	5/1
1923	Carpathus	4	7-10	James Ledson	Matthew D Peacock	4/1	3:21.80
1924	Jazz Band	5	8-03	Charlie Smirke	A Scott	5/1
1925	Obliterate	4	8-12	Joe Childs	Robert Colling	3/1 F
1926	Foxlaw	4	7-13	Michael Beary	Reg Day	5/1	3:35.80
1927	Border Minstrel	4	7-03	Tommy Weston	Matthew D Peacock	3/1 JF	3:27.40
1928	Primrose League	5	7-06	Billy Nevett	Matthew D Peacock	100/7	3:34.00
1929	Ballynahinch	6	7-01	Joseph Caldwell	Alf Sadler Jr.	10/1	3:22.40
1930	Show Girl	4	8-04	Charlie Elliott	Jack Watts	100/8
1931	Blue Vision	4	7-04	Ken Gethin	Ivor Anthony	11/4	3:34.80
1932	Pomarrel	5	7-05	Johnny Dines	Matthew D Peacock	8/1
1933	Leonard	7	7-09	Billy Bullock	Charles Elsey	100/7	3:27.20
1934	Whiteplains	4	7-11	Eph Smith	Jack Jarvis	25/1
1935	Doreen Jane	5	7-08	Doug Smith	Harry Cottrill	15/8 F	3:28.00
1936	Coup de Roi	4	7-13	Eph Smith	Richard Dawson	5/2 JF	3:25.40
1937	Nectar II	4	7-12	Peter Maher	Sam Armstrong	100/8	3:25.80
1938	Union Jack	4	8-00	Billy Nevett	Charles Elsey	10/1	3:30.20
1939	Oracion	4	8-00	Tommy Weston	George Lambton	9/1	3:29.80
1940-45	no race
1946 (Note: The 1946 running took place at Aintree.)	Gusty	4	9-02	Harry Wragg	Charles Elsey	7/4 F	3:40.20
1947	Culrain	6	7-07	Doug Smith	T Hall	9/2 F	3:31.60
1948	Pappatea	5	9-05	Harry Blackshaw	George Boyd	20/1	3:27.80
1949	Fol Ami	4	7-01	Willie Snaith	Sam Armstrong	9/2 JF	3:22.00
1950	Light Cavalry	4	7-06	Joe Sime	Michael Everitt	10/1	3:27.20
1951	Sycomore II	4	8-03	Edgar Britt	Sam Armstrong	9/4 F	3:26.40
1952	Souepi	4	7-06	Herbert Packham	George Digby	4/5 F	3:45.40
1953	Nick La Rocca	4	8-11	Joe Mercer	Jack Colling	9/4 F	3:26.60
1954	Friseur	4	8-02	Gordon Richards	Noel Murless	7/1	3:29.40
1955	Little Cloud	4	8-04	Lester Piggott	Noel Murless	13/2	3:26.80
1956	Jardiniere	4	8-00	Doug Smith	Noel Murless	2/1 F	3:25.60
1957	Great Rock	4	7-08	Eddie Hide	Bill Dutton	10/1	3:27.40
1958	Master Of Arts	5	8-04	Joe Mercer	Jack Colling	7/2 F	3:43.40
1959	Cannebierre	6	7-09	Donald Morris	Andrew Barclay	100/7	3:31.00
1960	New Brig	4	8-08	Norman Stirk	George Boyd	10/1	3:24.80
1961	Utrillo	4	7-01	Des Cullen	Bill O'Gorman Sr.	100/7	3:29.40
1962	Bordone	4	8-05	Geoff Littlewood	Buster Fenningworth	100/7	3:32.00
1963	Horse Radish	4	7-08	Peter Robinson	Freddie Maxwell	8/1	3:42.80
1964	Peter Piper	4	7-09	Jock Wilson	R Mason	28/1	3:24.20
1965	Cagirama	6	7-05	Norman McIntosh	George Boyd	9/1	3:30.80
1966	Sweet Story	4	8-04	Jimmy Etherington	Richard Peacock	100/7	3:36.80
1967	Piaco	4	9-01	Taffy Thomas	Geoffrey Barling	100/30 F	3:28.40
1968	Amateur	4	7-09	Willie Carson	Bernard van Cutsem	100/9	3:37.40
1969	Even Say	4	7–11	Frankie Durr	Ryan Jarvis	6/1 F	3:27.60
1970	Philoctetes	6	7–12	Pat Eddery	Staff Ingham	20/1	3:35.87
1971	Tartar Prince	4	7-08	John Higgins	Tom Waugh	5/1	3:38.05
1972	Scoria	6	7-06	R Smyth	Colin Crossley	17/2	3:29.77
1973	Tom Cribb	4	8-04	Brian Jago	Bruce Hobbs	11/1	3:30.42
1974	Attivo	4	7-08	Roger Wernham	Cyril Mitchell	7/4 F	3:34.86
1975	Grey God	4	8-09	Bruce Raymond	Michael Jarvis	8/1	3:26.49
1976	Philominsky	5	8-00	Richard Marshall	Bill Marshall	20/1	3:28.68
1977	Tug Of War	4	8-07	Brian Rouse	Boggy Whelan	16/1	3:27.50
1978	Tug Of War	5	9-02	Brian Rouse	Boggy Whelan	11/2	3:31.34
1979	Totowah	5	8-02	Bruce Raymond	Michael Jarvis	5/1	3:28.63
1980	Mon's Beau	5	7-07	Shaun Salmon	E Beeson	40/1	3:36.47
1981	Dawn Johnny	4	8-06	Mark Birch	Michael Stoute	5/1 F	3:30.87
1982	Abandoned due to waterlogging
1983	Weavers Pin	6	8-08	Paul Eddery	Merrick Francis	20/1	3:27.55
1984	Karadar	6	9–10	Tony Kimberley	Michael Stoute	10/1	3:26.71
1985	Trade Line	4	7–10	Tyrone Williams	Ron Sheather	17/2	3:27.14
1986	Sneak Preview	6	8–12	Simon Whitworth	Henry Candy	4/1 F	3:24.93
1987	Treasure Hunter	8	7-07	Lindsay Charnock	Jimmy FitzGerald	20/1	3:32.69
1988	Stavordale	5	9-02	Michael Roberts	Harry Thomson Jones	9/4 F	3:25.36
1989	Orpheus	3	7-07	Richard Fox	Guy Harwood	4/1 JF	3:29.68
1990	Al Maheb	4	8–11	Willie Carson	Alec Stewart	9/2	3:28.96
1991	Tamarpour	4	7-07	Ernie Johnson	Martin Pipe	10/1	3:26.00
1992	Witness Box	5	9-09	George Duffield	John Gosden	6/1	3:25.48
1993	Highflying	7	7–11	Joe Fanning	George M. Moore	7/1	3:25.10
1994	Quick Ransom	6	8-08	Jason Weaver	Mark Johnston	25/1	3:24.86
1995	Bold Gait	4	9–10	David Harrison	James Fanshawe	12/1	3:27.36
1996	Celeric	4	9-04	Willie Carson	David Morley	2/1 F	3:27.33
1997	Windsor Castle	3	8–10	Richard Quinn	Paul Cole	10/1	3:45.35
1998	Cyrian	4	7–13	Tim Sprake	Paul Cole	12/1	3:47.19
1999	Far Cry	4	8–10	Kevin Darley	Martin Pipe	9/2 JF	3:24.32
2000	Bay of Islands	8	8-04	Kevin Darley	David Morris	7/1	3:26.09
2001	Archduke Ferdinand	3	8-04	Franny Norton	Paul Cole	12/1	3:26.70
2002	Bangalore	6	9-05	Seb Sanders	Amanda Perrett	8/1	3:29.10
2003	Unleash	4	8–11	Jamie Spencer	Philip Hobbs	10/1	3:31.13
2004	Mirjan	8	8-03	Paul Hanagan	Len Lungo	33/1	3:37.54
2005	Sergeant Cecil	6	8-08	Alan Munro	Rod Millman	14/1	3:29.37
2006	Toldo	4	8-02	Nelson de Souza	George M. Moore	33/1	3:27.48
2007	Juniper Girl	4	8–11	Luke Morris	Michael Bell	5/1 F	3:46.01
2008	Arc Bleu	7	8-02	Adrian Nicholls	Tony Martin	14/1	3:37.71
2009	Som Tala	6	8-08	Tony Culhane	Mick Channon	16/1	3:45.10
2010	Overturn	6	8-07	Eddie Ahern	Donald McCain	14/1	3:28.05
2011	Tominator	4	8-05	Paul Pickard	Reg Hollinshead	25/1	3:29.48
2012	Ile de Re	6	9-03	Jim Crowley	Donald McCain	5/2 F	3:53.94
2013	Tominator	6	9–10	Graham Lee	Jonjo O'Neill	8/1	3:34.11
2014	Angel Gabrial	5	8–12	George Chaloner	Richard Fahey	4/1 F	3:28.96
2015	Quest For More	5	9-04	George Baker	Roger Charlton	15/2	3:26.53
2016	Antiquarium	4	9-05	James McDonald	Charlie Appleby	16/1	3:30.91
2017	Higher Power	5	9-09	Tom Queally	James Fanshawe	11/2	3:35.37
2018	Withhold	5	9-01	Robert Winston	Roger Charlton	5/1 F	3:33.56
2019	Who Dares Wins	7	9-01	Tom Marquand	Alan King	12/1	3:33.14
2020	Caravan Of Hope	4	8-05	Harry Bentley	Hugo Palmer	9/2 F	3:33.21
2021	Nicholas T	9	8–10	Ben Robinson	Jim Goldie	33/1	3:31.88
2022	Trueshan	6	10–08	Hollie Doyle	Alan King	3/1 F	3:39.75
2023	Calling The Wind	7	09–04	Neil Callan	Richard Hughes	14/1	3:31.40
2024	Onesmoothoperator	6	08–09	Connor Beasley	Brian Ellison	12/1	3:27.59
2025	Spirit Mixer	7	08–10	Rob Hornby	Andrew Balding	25/1	3:31.28
2026	Align The Stars	5	09–06	Daniel Muscutt	Charlie Johnston	10/1	3:33.75

== Earlier winners ==
- 1833: Tomboy
- 1834: Fanny
- 1835: Satan
- 1836: Cyprian
- 1837: Wedge
- 1838: St Bennet
- 1839: St Bennet
- 1840: Hetman Platoff
- 1841: Calypso
- 1842: Heslington
- 1843: Moss Trooper
- 1844: The Era
- 1845: Inheritress
- 1846: Dolo
- 1847: Eryx
- 1848: Chanticleer
- 1849: John Cosser
- 1850: Elthiron
- 1851: Neasham
- 1852: Stilton
- 1853: Kingston
- 1854: Grapeshot
- 1855: Whitelock
- 1856: Zeta
- 1857: Underhand
- 1858: Underhand
- 1859: Underhand
- 1860: First Lord
- 1861: Joey Jones
- 1862: Montebello
- 1863: Caller Ou
- 1864: Caller Ou
- 1865: Brown Bread
- 1866: Rococo
- 1867: Fervacques
- 1868: Fortunio
- 1869: The Spy
- 1870: Kennington
- 1871: Taraban
- 1872: Spennithorne
- 1873: Falkland
- 1874: Lily Agnes
- 1875: Harriet Laws
- 1876: The Snail
- 1877: Hampton
- 1878: Glastonbury
- 1879: Clearhead
- 1880: Mycenae
- 1881: Bonnie Doon
- 1882: Victor Emanuel
- 1883: Barcaldine
- 1884: Lawminster
- 1885: Blue Grass
- 1886: Stone Clink
- 1887: Exmoor
- 1888: Matin Bell
- 1889: Drizzle
- 1890: Houndsditch
- 1891: Queen's Birthday
- 1892: Newcourt
- 1893: Seaton Delaval
- 1894: Newcourt
- 1895: The Docker
- 1896: Dare Devil
- 1897: Bradwardine
- 1898: King Crow
- 1899: Sherburn

== See also ==
- Horse racing in Great Britain
- List of British flat horse races
