= Trawlerman (horse) =

Irish-bred thoroughbred racehorse

- Racing colours of Godolphin
- Sire: Golden Horn
- Grandsire: Cape Cross
- Dam: Tidespring
- Damsire: Monsun
- Sex: Gelding
- Foaled: February 16, 2018 (age 8)
- Country: Ireland
- Colour: Bay
- Breeder: Godolphin
- Owner: Godolphin
- Trainer: John and Thady Gosden
- Jockey: Lanfranco Dettori; William Buick
- Record: 25: 11-3-5
- Earnings: £2,158,498

Major wins
- British Champions Long Distance Cup (2023, 2025); Henry II Stakes (2025); Ascot Gold Cup (2025); Lonsdale Cup (2025)

Awards
- Cartier Champion Stayer (2025)

Trawlerman (foaled 16 February 2018) is a retired Irish-bred Thoroughbred racehorse. Trained by John and Thady Gosden for Godolphin, he was a leading British long-distance racehorse whose major victories included the Ebor Handicap, Gold Cup and British Champions Long Distance Cup.

Later in his career, he wore customised goggles due to a rare condition that made him sensitive to light.

He was retired from racing in August 2026.

== Pedigree ==
Pedigree of Trawlerman (IRE), bay gelding, 2018
Sire Golden Horn (GB) 2012	Cape Cross (IRE); 1994	Green Desert (USA)	Danzig (USA)
Sire Golden Horn (GB) 2012	Cape Cross (IRE); 1994	Green Desert (USA)	Foreign Courier (USA)
Sire Golden Horn (GB) 2012	Cape Cross (IRE); 1994	Park Appeal (IRE)	Ahonoora (GB)
Sire Golden Horn (GB) 2012	Cape Cross (IRE); 1994	Park Appeal (IRE)	Balidares (IRE)
Sire Golden Horn (GB) 2012	Fleche d'Or (GB); 2006	Dubai Destination (USA)	Kingmambo (USA)
Sire Golden Horn (GB) 2012	Fleche d'Or (GB); 2006	Dubai Destination (USA)	Mysterial (USA)
Sire Golden Horn (GB) 2012	Fleche d'Or (GB); 2006	Nuryana (GB)	Nureyev (USA)
Sire Golden Horn (GB) 2012	Fleche d'Or (GB); 2006	Nuryana (GB)	Loralane (GB)
Dam Tidespring (IRE) 2008	Monsun (GER); 1990	Königsstuhl (GER)	Dschingis Khan (GER)
Dam Tidespring (IRE) 2008	Monsun (GER); 1990	Königsstuhl (GER)	Königskrönung (GER)
Dam Tidespring (IRE) 2008	Monsun (GER); 1990	Mosella (GER)	Surumu (GER)
Dam Tidespring (IRE) 2008	Monsun (GER); 1990	Mosella (GER)	Monasia (GER)
Dam Tidespring (IRE) 2008	Sweet Stream (ITY); 2000	Shantou (USA)	Alleged (USA)
Dam Tidespring (IRE) 2008	Sweet Stream (ITY); 2000	Shantou (USA)	Shaima (USA)
Dam Tidespring (IRE) 2008	Sweet Stream (ITY); 2000	Snug Dinner (IRE)	Jareer (USA)
Dam Tidespring (IRE) 2008	Sweet Stream (ITY); 2000	Snug Dinner (IRE)	Stand By Me (IRE) (Family: 9-c)

- Trawlerman is an inbred by 5 x 5 x 5 to Northern Dancer (Danzig's, Nureyev's and Jareer's sire), and 4 x 5 to Alleged (Mysterial's sire).
