= Grand Cup =

Flat horse race in Britain

Grand Cup
2026
Gregory	Tabletalk	Mount Atlas

Previous years
2025
Al Qareem	Absurde	El Cordobes
2024
Klondike	Salt Bay	Relentless Voyager
2023
Quickthorn	Israr	Divine Jewel
2022
Without A Fight	John Leeper	Euchen Glen
2021
Roberto Escobarr	Red Verdon	Makawee

2020-2011
2020
Red Verdon	King's Advice	Euchen Glen
2019
Gold Mount	Raheen House	Buzz
2018
Marmelo	Weekender	Duretto
2017
Dal Harraild	Nakeeta	Seamour
2016
Moonrise Landing	Quest For More	Angel Gabrial
2015
Clever Cookie	Nabatean	Angel Gabrial
2014
Clever Cookie	Ralston Road	Shwaiman
2013
Songcraft	Bite Of The Cherry	Address Unknown
2012
Cavalryman	Calico Cat	Gulf of Naples
2011
Times Up	Theology	Montaff

2010-2008
2010
Tactic	Munsef	Macarthur
2009
Caracciola	Friston Forest	Halla San
2008
Samuel	Tranquil Tiger	Regal Flush

The Grand Cup is a Listed flat horse race in Great Britain open to horses aged four years or older. It is run at York over a distance of 1 mile 5 furlongs and 188 yards (2,787 metres), and it is scheduled to take place each year in June.

The race was first run in 2008 and prior to 2017 it was run in late May. It was moved to a fixture in mid-June in 2018 as part of changes to European stayers' races.

== Winners ==
Year	Winner	Age	Jockey	Trainer	Time
2008	Samuel	4	Eddie Ahern	John Dunlop	2:55.03
2009	Caracciola	12	Dale Gibson	Nicky Henderson	3:02.68
2010	Tactic	4	Jimmy Quinn	John Dunlop	2:54.96
2011	Times Up	5	Eddie Ahern	John Dunlop	2:59.03
2012	Cavalryman	6	Frankie Dettori	Saeed bin Suroor	3:01.24
2013	Songcraft	5	Silvestre de Sousa	Saeed bin Suroor	3:10.18
2014 (dh)	Clever Cookie; Ralston Road	6; 4	Graham Lee; Ronan Whelan	Peter Niven; John Patrick Shanahan	3:03.14
2015	Clever Cookie	7	P. J. McDonald	Peter Niven	3:00.79
2016	Moonrise Landing	5	Fran Berry	Ralph Beckett	3:00.03
2017	Dal Harraild	4	Paul Hanagan	William Haggas	3:02.72
2018	Marmelo	5	Ryan Moore	Hughie Morrison	2:54.92
2019	Gold Mount (Note: Gold Mount originally raced in Britain under the name Primitivo)	6	Andrea Atzeni	Ian Williams	2:59.95
2020 (Note: The 2020 race was run at Doncaster due to the COVID-19 pandemic in the United Kingdom)	Red Verdon	7	David Allan	Ed Dunlop	3:10.13
2021	Roberto Escobarr	4	Tom Marquand	William Haggas	3:01.17
2022	Without A Fight	5	Andrea Atzeni	Simon & Ed Crisford	3:02.86
2023	Quickthorn	6	Jason Hart	Hughie Morrison	2:59.70
2024	Klondike	4	Ryan Moore	William Haggas	3:07.34
2025	Al Qareem	6	Clifford Lee	Karl Burke	2:58.21
2026	Gregory	6	James Doyle	John & Thady Gosden	2:57.45

== See also ==
- Horse racing in Great Britain
- List of British flat horse races
