= Nad Al Sheba Trophy =

- Class: Group 3
- Location: Meydan Racecourse; Dubai, United Arab Emirates
- Inaugurated: 2011
- Race type: Thoroughbred - Flat racing

Race information
- Distance: 2,810 metres
- Surface: Turf
- Track: Left-handed
- Qualification: 4-y-o+
- Purse: $300,000

The Nad Al Sheba Trophy, is a horse race run over a distance of 2,810 metres (one and three quarter miles) on turf in late February or early March at Meydan Racecourse in Dubai. The race is named after Nad Al Sheba Racecourse which was the principal racing venue in Dubai before it was replaced by Maeydan.

The Nad Al Sheba Trophy was first contested in 2011 as a Listed race and was elevated to Group 3 level a year later.

== Records ==
Record time:

- 2:53.78 - Manobo 2022

Most successful horse (2 wins):

- Siskany 2023, 2024

Most wins by a jockey:

- 5 - William Buick 2018, 2020, 2022, 2023, 2024

Most wins by a trainer:

- 6 - Charlie Appleby 2018, 2019, 2020, 2022, 2023, 2024

Most wins by an owner:

- 12 - Godolphin 2011, 2013, 2014, 2017, 2018, 2019, 2020, 2021, 2022, 2023, 2024, 2025

== Winners ==
Year	Winner	Age	Jockey	Trainer	Owner	Time
2011	Claremont	5	Mickael Barzalona	Mahmood Al Zarooni	Godolphin	2:59.48
2012	Fox Hunt	5	Frankie Dettori	Mahmood Al Zarooni	Hamdan bin Mohammed Al Maktoum	3:01.09
2013	Ahzeemah	4	Kieren Fallon	Saeed bin Suroor	Godolphin	2:59.26
2014	Cavalryman	8	Silvestre de Sousa	Saeed bin Suroor	Godolphin	2:56.48
2015	Almoonqith	5	Paul Hanagan	Mike de Kock	Hamdan Al Maktoum	2:54.47
2016	Sheikhzayedroad	7	Martin Harley	David Simcock	Mohammed Jaber	2:57.19
2017	Beautiful Romance	5	Oisin Murphy	Saeed bin Suroor	Godolphin	2:58.44
2018	Rare Rhythm	6	William Buick	Charlie Appleby	Godolphin	2:54.88
2019	Ispolini	4	Mickael Barzalona	Charlie Appleby	Godolphin	2:55.96
2020	Secret Advisor	6	William Buick	Charlie Appleby	Godolphin	2:55.64
2021	Volcanic Sky	6	Frankie Dettori	Saeed bin Suroor	Godolphin	2:56.63
2022	Manobo	4	William Buick	Charlie Appleby	Godolphin	2:53.78
2023	Siskany	5	William Buick	Charlie Appleby	Godolphin	2:54:14
2024	Siskany	6	William Buick	Charlie Appleby	Godolphin	2:57.06
2025	Dubai Future	9	Silvestre De Sousa	Saeed bin Suroor	Godolphin	2:57.55
2026	Al Nayyir	8	Rossa Ryan	Rom Clover	Elbashir Salem AB Elhrari	2:56.38

== Casualties and incidents ==
- 2015 - Cavalryman, owned by Godolphin and trained by Saeed bin Suroor suffered a fracture in his right hind leg while participating in the race and was euthanized.

== See also ==
- List of United Arab Emirates horse races
