= Upavon Fillies' Stakes =

Flat horse race in Britain

- Class: Listed
- Location: Salisbury Racecourse; Salisbury, England
- Race type: Flat / Thoroughbred
- Sponsor: British Stallion Studs
- Website: Salisbury

Race information
- Distance: 1m 1f 201y (1,994 metres)
- Surface: Turf
- Track: Right-hand
- Qualification: Three-years-old and up fillies and mares
- Weight: 8 st 10 lb (3yo); 9 st 4 lb (4yo+); Penalties; 7 lb for Group 1 winners * 5 lb for Group 2 winners * 3 lb for Group 3 winners * * after 2024
- Purse: £50,000 (2025); 1st: £28,355

Upavon Fillies' Stakes
2026
On Message	Miss Scott	Felicitas

Previous years
2025
Miss Justice	Revoir	Ambiente Amigo
2024
High Spirited	Rainbows Edge	Sea Of Roses
2023
State Occasion	Running Lion	Makinmedoit
2022
Rousay	Rose Of Kildare	By Starlight
2021
Lilac Road	Technique	Vesela

2020-2011
2020
Alpinista	Award Scheme	Queen Power
2019
Fanny Logan	Sand Share	Skill Set
2018
Chain Of Daisies	Mia Tesoro	Promising Run
2017
Billesdon Bess	High Hopes	Rosental
2016
Chain Of Daisies	Sagaciously	Maybelater
2015
Journey	Suffused	Tazffin
2014
Lady Pimpernel	Gifted Girl	My Spirit
2013
Mango Diva	Hippy Hippy Shake	Rock Choir
2012
Opera Gal	Oojooba	Rumh
2011
Primevere	Opera Gal	Seta

2010-2001
2010
Alsace Lorraine	Gallic Star	Mudaaraah
2009
Ave	Splashdown	Sterling Sound
2008
Lady Deauville	Sweet Lilly	Cape Amber
2007
Promising Lead	Sell Out	Russian Rosie
2006
Pictavia	Princess Nada	Kahlua Kiss
2005
La Persiana	Bon Nuit	Something Exciting
2004
New Morning	Tahtheeb	Snow Goose
2003
Hoh Buzzard	Quiet Storm	Echoes In Eternity
2002
Chorist	Fraulein	Averted View
2001
Premier Prize	Katy Nowaitee	Guaranda

2000-1990
2000
First Fantasy	Dashiba	Dream Quest
1999
Ajhiba	Choirgirl	Valentine Girl
1998
Zante	Innuendo	Putuna
1997
Dust Dancer	Dragonada	The Faraway Tree
1996
Altamura	Min Alhawa	Ta Awun
1995
Ellie Ardensky	Cask	Vena
1993
Dana Springs	Andromaque	Magical Retreat
1992
Delve	Party Cited	Never A Care
1991
Gai Bulga	Elfaslah	Always Friendly
1990
Mill Run	Ruby Setting	Jathibiyah

The Upavon Fillies' Stakes is a Listed flat horse race in Great Britain open to mares and fillies aged three years or older. It is run at Salisbury over a distance of 1 mile 1 furlong and 201 yards (1,994 metres), and it is scheduled to take place each year in August. It was first confined to fillies in 1964.

== Records ==
Most successful horse (2 wins):

- Chain Of Daisies – 2016, 2018

Leading jockey since 1964 (7 wins):

- Pat Eddery – Hello Honey (1974), Bessie Wallis (1977), Be Sweet (1978), Sirenivo (1979), Dance Machine (1985), Flamingo Pond (1989), Chorist (2002)

Leading trainer since 1964 (6 wins):

- Dick Hern – Cytheris (1972), Mey (1973), Hurlingham (1975), Restful (1980), My Maravilla (1982), Really Regal (1983)

== Winners since 1964 ==
Year	Winner	Age	Jockey	Trainer	Time
1964	Isabella Piccini	3	Scobie Breasley	Jack Clayton	1:46.63
1965	Machella	3	Greville Starkey	John Oxley	2:15.15
1966	Solway Bay	3	Ron Hutchinson	Herbert Blagrave	2:30.07
1967	Pertinacity	3	Sandy Barclay	Arthur Budgett	2:22.54
1968	Grandpa's Legacy	3	Ron Sheather	Toby Balding	2:21.83
1969	Yesterday	3	Eddie Hide	Sir Gordon Richards	2:22.96
1970	Winding River	3	Joe Mercer	Derrick Candy	2:12.31
1971	Nonsensical	3	Philip Waldron	Ian Balding	2:16.69
1972	Cytheris	3	Joe Mercer	Dick Hern	Not taken
1973	Mey	3	Joe Mercer	Dick Hern	2:09.82
1974	Hello Honey	3	Pat Eddery	Peter Walwyn	2:14.87
1975	Hurlingham	3	Joe Mercer	Dick Hern	2:11.17
1976	Rowantree	3	Joe Mercer	Ian Balding	2:11.52
1977	Bessie Wallis	3	Pat Eddery	Peter Walwyn	2:08.90
1978	Be Sweet	3	Pat Eddery	Peter Walwyn	2:15.09
1979	Sirenivo	3	Pat Eddery	Peter Walwyn	2:14.59
1980	Restful	3	Willie Carson	Dick Hern	2:17.15
1981	Flighting	3	Willie Carson	John Dunlop	2:09.77
1982	My Maravilla	3	Willie Carson	Dick Hern	2:07.72
1983	Really Regal	3	Joe Mercer	Dick Hern	2:08.11
1984	Visible Form	3	Darrel McHargue	Luca Cumani	2:06.26
1985	Dance Machine	3	Pat Eddery	John Dunlop	2:15.62
1986	Kick The Habit	3	Geoff Baxter	Clive Brittain	2:10.95
1987	Belle Poitrine	3	Steve Cauthen	Henry Cecil	2:05.23
1988	Rumoosh	3	Walter Swinburn	Michael Stoute	2:06.45
1989	Flamingo Pond	3	Pat Eddery	Jeremy Tree	2:08.06
1990	Mill Run	3	Frankie Dettori	Luca Cumani	2:11.38
1991	Gai Bulga	3	Gary Carter	Geoff Wragg	2:04.92
1992	Delve	3	Richard Quinn	John Dunlop	2:07.69
1993	Dana Springs	3	Frankie Dettori	Richard Hannon Sr.	2:05.65
1994	No race
1995	Ellie Ardensky	3	David Harrison	James Fanshawe	2:06.13
1996	Altamura	3	Frankie Dettori	John Gosden	2:05.77
1997	Dust Dancer	3	Brett Doyle	John Dunlop	2:07.64
1998	Zante	3	Kieren Fallon	Henry Cecil	2:04.99
1999	Ajhiba	3	Frankie Dettori	Saeed bin Suroor	2:08.03
2000	First Fantasy	4	Ray Cochrane	James Fanshawe	2:08.03
2001	Premier Prize	4	Richard Hughes	David Elsworth	2:06.67
2002	Chorist	3	Pat Eddery	William Haggas	2:06.74
2003	Hoh Buzzard	3	Jamie Mackay	Michael Bell	2:07.75
2004	New Morning	3	Philip Robinson	Michael Jarvis	2:05.39
2005	La Persiana	4	Alan Munro	William Jarvis	2:05.88
2006	Pictavia	4	Frankie Dettori	Saeed bin Suroor	2:06.07
2007	Promising Lead	3	Ryan Moore	Sir Michael Stoute	2:11.24
2008	Lady Deauville	3	Franny Norton	Paul Blockley	2:12.60
2009	Ave	3	Ryan Moore	Sir Michael Stoute	2:05.99
2010	Alsace Lorraine	5	Kieren Fallon	James Fanshawe	2:09.17
2011	Primevere	3	Hayley Turner	Roger Charlton	2:04.81
2012	Opera Gal	5	Jimmy Fortune	Andrew Balding	2:08.91
2013	Mango Diva	3	Franny Norton	Sir Michael Stoute	2:08.08
2014	Lady Pimpernel	4	Dane O'Neill	Henry Candy	2:06.85
2015	Journey	3	Robert Havlin	John Gosden	2:04.06
2016	Chain of Daisies	4	Fergus Sweeney	Henry Candy	2:04.00
2017	Billesdon Bess	3	Hollie Doyle	Richard Hannon Jr.	2:05.80
2018	Chain Of Daisies	6	Harry Bentley	Henry Candy	2:07.99
2019	Fanny Logan	3	Robert Havlin	John Gosden	2:11.97
2020	Alpinista	3	Ryan Tate	Sir Mark Prescott	2:04.70
2021	Lilac Road	3	Tom Marquand	William Haggas	2:08.96
2022	Rousay	3	Hollie Doyle	Richard Hannon Jr.	2:06.48
2023	State Occasion	5	Rossa Ryan	Ralph Beckett	2:05.66
2024	High Spirited	4	Trevor Whelan	Henry Candy	2:07.64
2025	Miss Justice	4	William Buick	John & Thady Gosden	2:07.12
2026	On Message	3	Hector Crouch	Ralph Beckett	2:06.08

== See also ==
- Horse racing in Great Britain
- List of British flat horse races
