= Further Flight =

Irish-bred Thoroughbred racehorse

- Sire: Pharly
- Grandsire: Lyphard
- Dam: Flying Nelly
- Damsire: Nelcius
- Sex: Gelding
- Foaled: 1986
- Country: Ireland
- Colour: Grey
- Breeder: Simon Wingfield Digby
- Owner: Simon Wingfield Digby
- Trainer: Barry Hills
- Record: 70: 24-7-7
- Earnings: £514,021

Major wins
- Ebor Handicap (1990); Jockey Club Cup (1991, 1992, 1993, 1994, 1995); Goodwood Cup (1991, 1992); St. Simon Stakes (1991); Doncaster Cup (1992)

Awards
- European Champion Older Horse (1995)

Honours
- Barry Hills Further Flight Stakes at Nottingham Racecourse
- Last updated on June 22, 2007

Further Flight (3 May 1986 – July 2001) was an Irish-bred, British-trained thoroughbred racehorse best known for winning the Jockey Club Cup for five successive years. In a career which lasted from October 1988 until October 1998, he ran seventy times and won twenty-four races. In 1995, Further Flight was voted European Champion Older Horse at the Cartier Racing Awards. He is the only horse to win the same European Group race five times.

== Background ==
Further Flight was foaled in Ireland in 1986, sired by the Prix du Moulin de Longchamp winner Pharly out of the Cambridgeshire Handicap winner Flying Nelly, from whom he inherited his grey coat. He became a favourite of the British racing public, competing in and winning long-distance events in a career that lasted from 1988 to 1998. He was trained throughout his career by Barry Hills and ridden in 64 of his 70 starts by Michael Hills.

== Racing career ==
Further Flight did not appear on the racecourse until the autumn of 1988 when he ran down the field in a minor event at Chepstow. As a three-year-old he ran four times, winning once at Ayr. As a four-year-old he emerged as a top-class staying handicapper winning four races including the Ebor Handicap and finishing second in the Cesarewitch Handicap in which he attempted to give seventeen pounds to the winner.

In 1991 he won five of his eight races starting with two handicaps before moving up to Group class to win the Goodwood Cup, St Simon Stakes and his first Jockey Club Cup. He also finished first in the Prix Kergorlay but lost the race after a Steward's Inquiry.

In 1992, he was at his peak. A run of four consecutive Group race wins saw him add wins in the Doncaster Cup and Lonsdale Stakes to repeat victories in the Goodwood Cup and Jockey Club Cup.

As a seven-year-old in 1993 he captured a second Lonsdale Stakes and a third Jockey Club Cup. 1994 brought a fourth Jockey Club Cup and a win in a listed event at Newmarket.

By 1995, it was clear that his very best days were behind him, but wins at Haydock and Doncaster were followed by a fifth victory in the Jockey Club Cup. Further Flight continued to race for another three seasons, winning once in each of them, and putting in a number of good placed efforts, including a third place as an eleven-year-old in the 1997 Jockey Club Cup.

== Retirement ==
Further Flight was retired in 1998. As a gelding, he had no stud career but had an active retirement at the home of his former jockey Michael Hills. He died after suffering a paddock injury to his hind leg in July 2001.

== Assessment ==
Further Flight was named Top Older Horse in the 1995 Cartier Racing Awards. Since 1999 the Further Flight Stakes, named in his honour, has been run at Nottingham in April over 1 mile and 6 furlongs. The race has held Listed status since 2003.

His longevity and consistency, combined with his distinctive racing style and easily recognisable grey coat made him a popular favourite. On his retirement Barry Hills said, "You could live a lifetime and never have a horse like him again".

== Pedigree ==
Pedigree of Further Flight (IRE), grey gelding, 1986
Sire Pharly (FRA) 1974	Lyphard; 1969	Northern Dancer	Nearctic
Sire Pharly (FRA) 1974	Lyphard; 1969	Northern Dancer	Natalma
Sire Pharly (FRA) 1974	Lyphard; 1969	Goofed	Court Martial
Sire Pharly (FRA) 1974	Lyphard; 1969	Goofed	Barra
Sire Pharly (FRA) 1974	Comely; 1966	Boran	Mourne
Sire Pharly (FRA) 1974	Comely; 1966	Boran	Bethora
Sire Pharly (FRA) 1974	Comely; 1966	Princess Commene	Beau Prince
Sire Pharly (FRA) 1974	Comely; 1966	Princess Commene	Commemoration
Dam Flying Nelly (IRE) 1970	Nelcius; 1963	Tenareze	Goyama
Dam Flying Nelly (IRE) 1970	Nelcius; 1963	Tenareze	La Taglioni
Dam Flying Nelly (IRE) 1970	Nelcius; 1963	Namagua	Fontenay
Dam Flying Nelly (IRE) 1970	Nelcius; 1963	Namagua	Namesake
Dam Flying Nelly (IRE) 1970	Flying By; 1964	Bleep-Bleep	Hard Sauce
Dam Flying Nelly (IRE) 1970	Flying By; 1964	Bleep-Bleep	Curtsey
Dam Flying Nelly (IRE) 1970	Flying By; 1964	Japhette	Vilmorin
Dam Flying Nelly (IRE) 1970	Flying By; 1964	Japhette	Port Beam (Family: 3-n)
