= Esher Stakes =

Flat horse race in Britain

Coral Marathon
2026
Lazy Griff	Lady Vivian	Paradias

Previous years
2025
Coltrane	Al Nayyir	Real Dream
2024
Trueshan	Night Sparkle	Miss Cynthia
2023
Yibir	Aaddeey	Ocean Wind
2022
Coltrane	Rodrigo Diaz	Calling The Wind
2021
Red Verdon	The Grand Visir	Mildenberger

2020-2011
2019
Falcon Eight	Mekong	Cleonte
2018
Nearly Caught	Platitude	Jukebox Jive
2017
Nearly Caught	Montaly	Alyssa
2016
Sandro Botticelli	She Is No Lady	Nearly Caught
2015
Eye of The Storm	Angel Gabrial	Forgotten Voice
2014
Havana Beat	Repeater	Domination
2013
Caucus	Biographer	Chiberta King
2012
Cavalryman	Aaim To Prosper	Chiberta King
2011
Chiberta King	Aaim To Prosper	Electrolyser

2010-2003
2010
King Of Wands	Illustrious Blue	Opinion Poll
2009
Desert Sea	Victoria Montoya	Wells Lyrical
2008
Distinction	Samuel	Tungsten Strike
2007
Balkan Knight	Alambic	Finalmente
2006
Land 'n Stars	Sergeant Cecil	Winged d'Argent
2005
Shabernak	Midas Way	Cover Up
2004
Silver Gilt	Misternando	Royal Rebel
2003
Persian Punch	Cover Up	Dusky Warbler

The Coral Marathon is a Listed flat horse race in Great Britain open to horses aged four years and over. It is run at Sandown over a distance of 2 mile and 50 yards (3,264 metres), and it is scheduled to take place each year in July.

The race was first run in 2003 and is registered as the Esher Stakes. It takes place at the same meeting as Sandown Park's most prestigious and valuable flat race, the Eclipse Stakes.

== Winners ==
Year	Winner	Age	Jockey	Trainer	Time
2003	Persian Punch	10	Martin Dwyer	David Elsworth	3:36.23
2004	Silver Gilt	4	Frankie Dettori	John Gosden	3:41.17
2005	Shabernak	6	Richard Hughes	Michael Bell	3:33.36
2006	Land 'n Stars	6	Paul Doe	Jamie Poulton	3:39.72
2007	Balkan Knight	7	John Egan	David Elsworth	3:38.72
2008	Distinction	9	Ryan Moore	Sir Michael Stoute	3:34.73
2009	Desert Sea	6	Ryan Moore	David Arbuthnot	3:31.90
2010	King Of Wands	4	William Buick	John Gosden	3:29.86
2011	Chiberta King	5	Jimmy Fortune	Andrew Balding	3:31.41
2012	Cavalryman	6	Frankie Dettori	Saeed bin Suroor	3:39.19
2013	Caucus	6	William Buick	John Gosden	3:29.38
2014	Havana Beat	4	David Probert	Andrew Balding	3:48.57
2015	Eye Of The Storm	5	Pat Dobbs	Amanda Perrett	3:37.62
2016	Sandro Botticelli	4	Frankie Dettori	John Ryan	3:44.25
2017	Nearly Caught	7	James Doyle	Hughie Morrison	3:29.51
2018	Nearly Caught	8	James Doyle	Hughie Morrison	3:36.42
2019	Falcon Eight	4	Frankie Dettori	Dermot Weld	3:32.55
	no race 2020 (Note: The 2020 running was cancelled because of the COVID-19 pandemic in the United Kingdom. The race replaced by Group 3 Henry II Stakes)
2021	Red Verdon	8	Ryan Moore	Ed Dunlop	3:40.71
2022	Coltrane	5	Rob Hornby	Andrew Balding	3:33.37
2023	Yibir	5	William Buick	Charlie Appleby	3:35.57
2024	Trueshan	8	Hollie Doyle	Alan King	3:34.96
2025	Coltrane	8	William Buick	Andrew Balding	3:41.58
2026	Lazy Griff	4	Billy Loughnane	Charlie Johnston	3:38.85

== See also ==
- Horse racing in Great Britain
- List of British flat horse races
