= Hollie Doyle =

British jockey

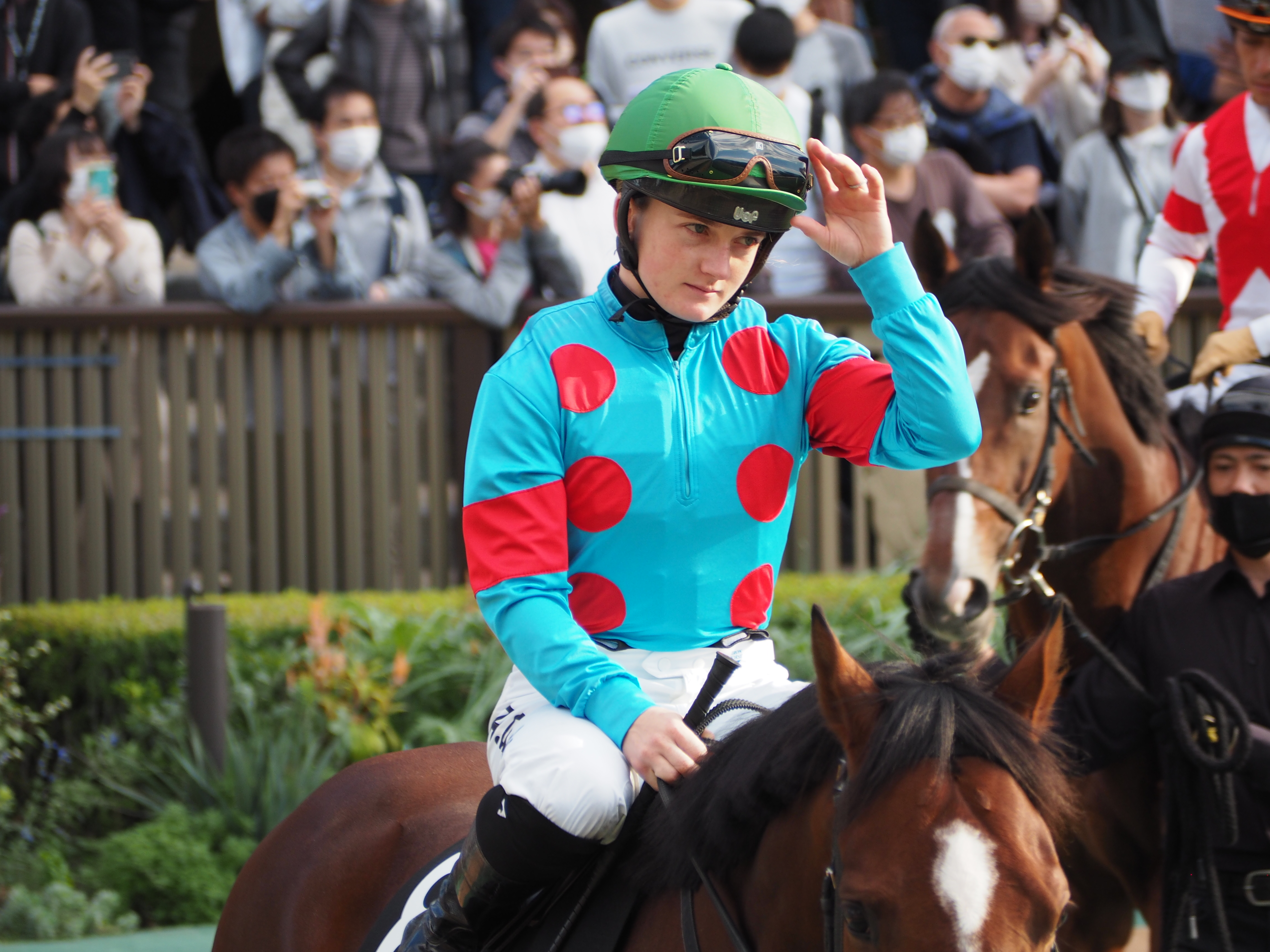
- Doyle riding in Japan in October 2022

Personal information
- Born: 11 October 1996 (age 30)
- Occupation: Jockey
- Spouse: Tom Marquand (m. 2022)

Horse racing career
- Sport: Horse racing

Major racing wins
- British Champions Sprint (2020); British Champions Long Distance Cup (2020, 2021, 2022); Princess of Wales's Stakes (2020); Goodwood Cup (2021); Prix de Diane (2022); Nassau Stakes (2022); Prix du Cadran (2023); Prix de l’Abbaye de Longchamp (2022); King's Stand Stakes (2023); Falmouth Stakes (2023); Nunthorpe Stakes (2024)

Significant horses
- Glen Shiel; Trueshan; Nashwa

Hollie Doyle (born 11 October 1996) is a British jockey who competes in flat racing. She set a new record for winners ridden in a British season by a female jockey in 2019. She came third in the BBC Sports Personality of the Year Award 2020, and was also named The Sunday Times sportswoman of the year. In June 2022 she became the first female jockey to win a French Classic and the first female jockey to win a European Group 1 Classic when she rode Nashwa to victory in the Prix de Diane (French Oaks) at Chantilly. In 2022, she came joint second in the Flat Jockeys' Championship, the highest result for a woman to date. She rode her 1,000th winner in September 2024, and rode her 1,000th British winner in March 2025.

== Background ==
Doyle comes from a racing background. Her father Mark Doyle, from Clonmel, is a former jockey and her mother Caroline rode in Arab horse races. The family lived in Herefordshire and had point-to-pointers and ponies at home. Doyle was a member of the Radnorshire & West Herefordshire Pony Club and rode her first pony race at the age of nine. She had her first ride under rules as an amateur rider on The Mongoose at Salisbury in May 2013, winning by half a length. After taking her GCSEs in 2013, she joined the training yard of David Evans in Wales. That winter she spent six weeks riding trackwork in Santa Anita Park in Arcadia, California.

== Career ==
Doyle moved as an apprentice jockey to the Wiltshire yard of trainer Richard Hannon in 2014 and rode out her claim in November 2017. Her first win in a Listed race came on Billesdon Bess in the August 2017 Upavon Fillies' Stakes at Salisbury while still an apprentice. In June 2018 Doyle was unseated in a race at Haydock and suffered facial injuries including the loss of several teeth. She returned to race riding after 10 days.

In 2019 Doyle set a new record for winners ridden in a calendar year in Britain by a female jockey with 116 victories, passing the previous record of 106 winners set by Josephine Gordon in 2017. Doyle's first win at Royal Ascot came in June 2020 when she steered 33/1 chance Scarlet Dragon to victory in the Duke of Edinburgh Stakes.

Doyle rode her first Group race winner on 9 July 2020 on Dame Malliot in the Princess of Wales's Stakes on the July Course at Newmarket. In the same month she was appointed as a retained jockey for owner Imad Al Sagar, and in August won the Rose of Lancaster Stakes on Extra Elusive for her new retainer. It was Doyle's second Group race win. On 29 August 2020 Doyle rode five winners in one day at Windsor Racecourse, making her the first female jockey to win five races on the same card in Britain. On 14 October 2020 Doyle rode her 117th winner of the season, breaking the female jockeys' record she set in 2019. On 17 October 2020, Doyle became the first female jockey to ride a winner on Champions Day at Ascot, when she steered Trueshan to victory in the Long Distance Cup. This was followed by a win in the Champions Sprint on Glen Shiel, trained by Archie Watson for whom Doyle rides as stable jockey. It was Doyle's first Group 1 win, and also a first Group 1 for Watson.

Doyle finished the season fourth in the flat jockeys' championship, which at the time was the highest ranking for a woman. In early November, she made her debut at the Breeders' Cup, riding Mighty Gurkha in the Breeders' Cup Juvenile Turf Sprint and getting her first ride for Aidan O'Brien on the undercard.

Doyle secured another five-timer, this time at Kempton Park, on 3 March 2021. She had her first opportunity to ride in a Classic race in the 2021 2000 Guineas, but her mount, outsider Albadri, reared up and fell on leaving the paddock and was withdrawn from the race. Another opportunity came when she was given the ride on Sherbet Lemon in the 2021 Oaks. Sherbert Lemon, a 28/1 outsider, finished ninth of 14 runners, a record placing for a female jockey in a British Classic race.

Doyle secured her second Group 1 victory on 27 July 2021 when she won the Goodwood Cup on 6/5 favourite Trueshan. She won the next two races to complete a 123-1 treble. On 11 September 2021, she rode the Aidan O'Brien trained Interpretation into fourth place in the St Leger Stakes at Doncaster, becoming the first female jockey to be placed in the prize money in a British Classic.

In September 2021 Doyle was given a seven-day ban for careless riding in a race at Kempton Park. The ban meant she missed a ride on Trueshan in the Prix du Cadran at Longchamp. James Doyle was given the ride and won the race. Doyle rode her 152nd winner of the year on 22 October, surpassing her own record for a British female jockey of 151 wins in 2020.

On 3 June 2022 Doyle rode Nashwa, bred and owned by Al Sagar and trained by John and Thady Gosden, into third place in the Oaks, a record for a female jockey in a British Classic. On 19 June 2022 Nashwa started 3/1 favourite for the Prix de Diane (French Oaks) at Chantilly. Doyle rode her to a narrow victory, becoming the first female jockey to win a European Group 1 Classic. (Note: In 2021 Sibylle Vogt won the German 1,000 Guineas, a Group 2 race.) Nashwa provided Doyle with another Group 1 win in the Nassau Stakes at Goodwood in July. Doyle's fifth Group 1 win came on two-year-old The Platinum Queen, trained by Richard Fahey, in the Prix de l'Abbaye de Longchamp in October. She came joint second in the 2022 flat jockeys' championship, the highest-ever ranking for a woman. She was tied with her husband Tom Marquand on 91 wins, 66 behind William Buick. The couple then set off to spend two months riding in Japan.

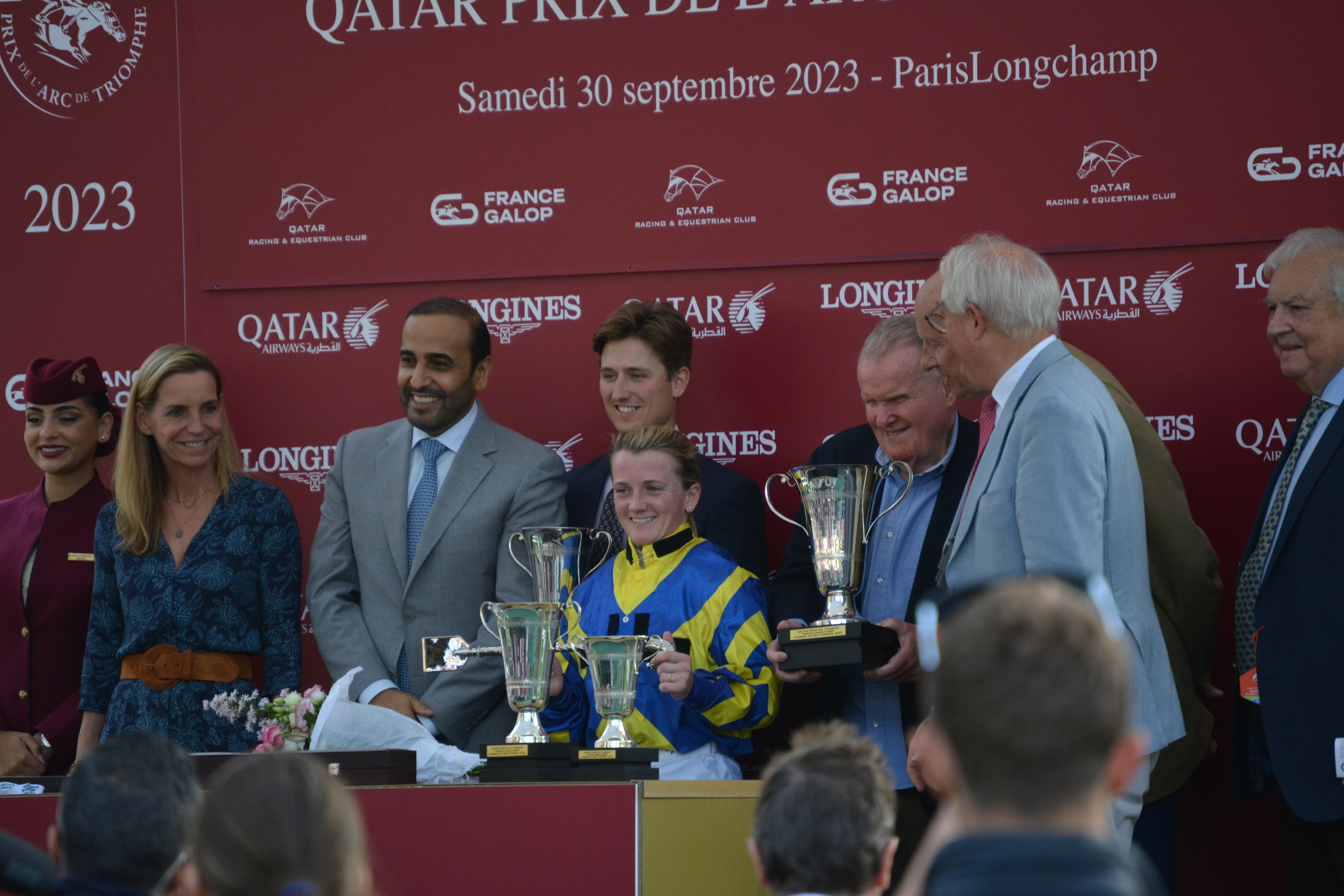
Doyle at prizegiving, Prix du Cadran 2023

On 16 January 2023, Doyle fractured her elbow and ruptured ligaments after her mount The Perfect Crown suffered a fatal injury during a race at Wolverhampton. The injury kept Doyle out of racing for two-an-a-half months. In June 2023 she secured her second European Classic, the Group 2 Oaks d'Italia at San Siro Racecourse in Milan, riding Shavasana for trainer Stefano Botti. Later that month she became the first female jockey to ride a Group 1 winner at Royal Ascot, when Bradsell, trained by Watson, survived a stewards' enquiry to take the King's Stand Stakes. There were further Group 1 successes on Nashwa in the Falmouth Stakes at Newmarket and on Trueshan in the Prix du Cadran at Longchamps.

In October 2023 Doyle was given a one-month suspended ban, having tested positive for dihydrocodeine in April. The British Horseracing Authority (BHA) accepted that she had taken the substance inadvertently in an over-the-counter painkiller purchased in Japan. Doyle, together with Marquand, returned to Japan in November 2023 for another short-term contract. In August 2024, Bradsell won the Nunthorpe Stakes to give Doyle her ninth Group 1 win. Doyle rode her 1,000th winner on Leyhaimur on 3 September 2024 at Goodwood. She rode her 1,000th British winner on Handle With Care at Lingfield on 24 March 2025.

Doyle has competed four times (2017, 2018, 2023 and 2025) in the Shergar Cup team event, being part of the winning team in 2018 and 2023 and winning the silver saddle award in 2023 for the jockey with the most points in the event. In 2025, she was captain of the Great Britain and Ireland team.

On 10 May 2025, Doyle became Britain's winningmost female jockey when she gained her 1,023rd winner riding Brindavan in a handicap at Ascot, and surpassed the record set by Hayley Turner. Doyle said:

"It's a nice milestone to reach and I'm really grateful to all the females before me. Hayley had it a lot tougher than I did and she’s paved the way for people like me to go on and do this, and there's plenty more female riders in the pipeline who will go on to do it."

In August 2025, her five-year retainer to ride for Al Sagar came to an end when the owner announced that he was replacing her with Oisin Murphy.

On 22 May 2026, when riding at Bath, Doyle sustained a fracture to her left leg when her mount, Vault Of Heaven, was fatally injured. Doyle underwent surgery and did not return to the racecourse until 31 October 2026, when she rode a winner at Southwell on her first ride back.

== Awards ==
In 2019 Doyle was awarded a Lester for lady jockey of the year. In December 2020 she was named The Sunday Times sportswoman of the year. Later that month she took third place in the BBC Sports Personality of the Year Award, and was awarded three Lesters including flat jockey of the year. In February 2022 she again won the female jockey of the year Lester award.

== Personal life ==
Doyle's husband is jockey Tom Marquand. The couple met in their Pony Club days, and they were for a time apprentices together at Richard Hannon's yard. They became engaged in 2020 and married on 21 March 2022 in the parish church of the village of Ivington in Herefordshire.

== Major wins ==
(United Kingdom) Great Britain

- British Champions Sprint Stakes - (1) - Glen Shiel (2020)
- Falmouth Stakes - (1) Nashwa (2023)
- Goodwood Cup - (1) Trueshan (2021)
- King's Stand Stakes - (1) Bradsell (2023)
- Nassau Stakes - (1) Nashwa (2022)
- Nunthorpe Stakes - (1) Bradsell (2024)

France

- Prix du Cadran - (1) Trueshan (2023)
- Prix de Diane - (1) Nashwa (2022)
- Prix de l'Abbaye de Longchamp - (1) The Platinum Queen (2022)

(Republic of Ireland) Ireland

- Flying Five Stakes - (1) Bradsell (2024)
