= Salisbury Racecourse =

Horse racing venue in England

Coordinates: 51°03′15″N 1°51′19″W

Salisbury
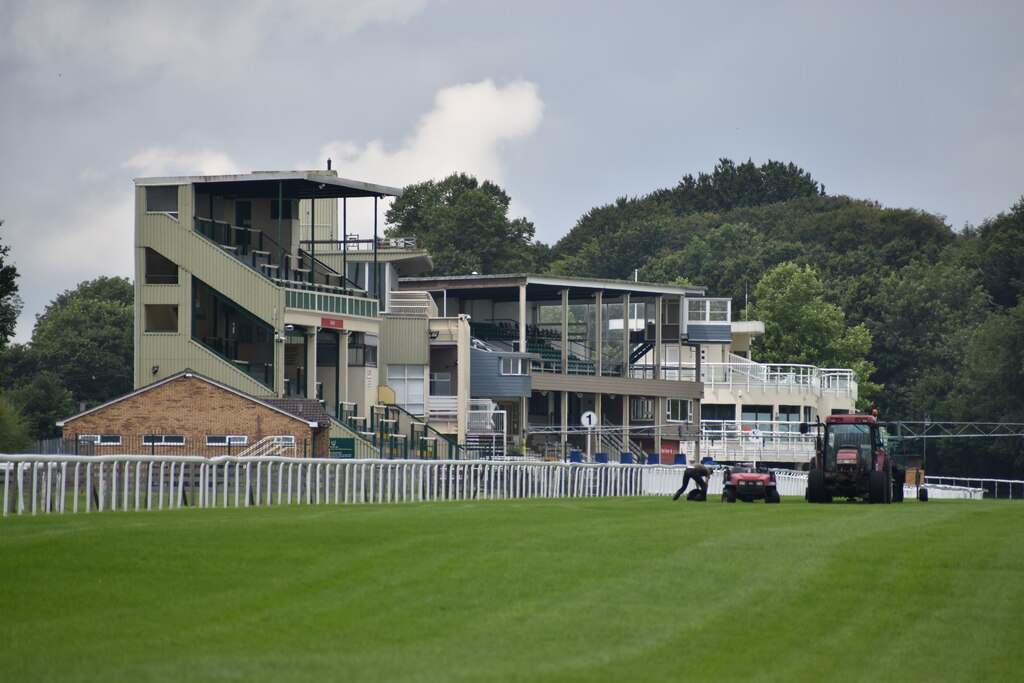
- The main stands
- Interactive map of Salisbury
- Location: Salisbury, Wiltshire
- Screened on: Racing TV
- Course type: Flat
- Notable races: Sovereign Stakes

Salisbury Racecourse is a flat racecourse in the United Kingdom featuring thoroughbred horse racing, 3 miles (5 km) southwest of Salisbury, Wiltshire, England. Fifteen race meetings a year are held there between early May and mid-October.

== History ==
Racing at the track, located three miles from Salisbury, has taken place since the mid-16th century. Many great horses have won at the racecourse including Gimcrack (1768), Eclipse (1769), Sun Chariot (1941), Mill Reef (1970) and Brigadier Gerard (1970). Sir Percy, winner of the 2006 Derby, and Look Here, winner of the 2008 Oaks, had both won at Salisbury the previous year. Lester Piggott, the jockey, first rode in public at Salisbury in 1948 when he was an apprentice jockey aged twelve and weighed only five stone. American jockey Steve Cauthen made his British debut at the course in 1979 when he rode Marquee Universal to victory here.

It was here in 1949 that Winston Churchill first raced Colonist II in the one mile Upavon Stakes. The horse won, and went on to win the Ribblesdale Stakes at Ascot later that year.

== The racecourse ==
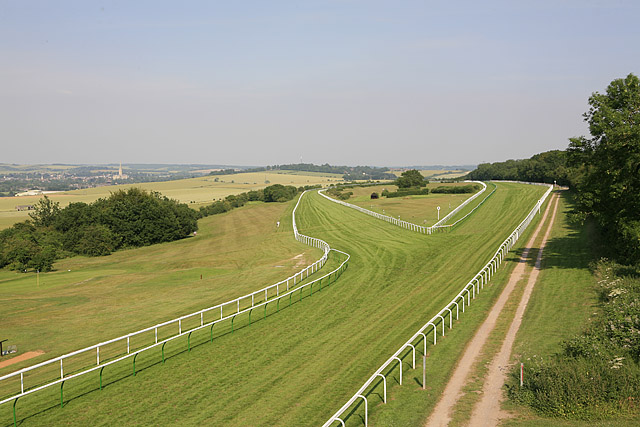
The buttonhook loop, one of only two at a British racecourse (the other being Hamilton)

About fifteen race meetings take place at Salisbury Racecourse each year between late April and mid-October. It is a downland flat-racing course with no jumps. There is a mix of race types with the majority being handicaps, where horses of similar ability race against each other, and maidens, where horses which have yet to win a race compete. The course is also renowned for its races for two-year-olds, and many of these young horses have gone on to achieve great things.

== Notable races ==
Month	DOW	Race Name	Type	Grade	Distance	Age/Sex
June	Sunday	Cathedral Stakes	Flat	Listed	6f	3yo +
August	Wednesday	Stonehenge Stakes	Flat	Listed	1m	2yo
August	Wednesday	Upavon Fillies' Stakes	Flat	Listed	1m 1f 201y	3yo +
September	Thursday	Dick Poole Fillies' Stakes	Flat	Group 3	6f	2yo only f

Salisbury's earliest big race was the King's Plate for 6-year-olds, awarded by George I in 1723.
