= 1996 in sports =

1996 in sports describes the year's events in world sport.

== Alpine skiing ==
- Alpine Skiing World Cup
  - Men's overall season champion: Lasse Kjus, Norway
  - Women's overall season champion: Katja Seizinger, Germany

== American football ==
- Super Bowl XXX – the Dallas Cowboys (NFC) won 27–17 over the Pittsburgh Steelers (AFC)
  - Location: Sun Devil Stadium
  - Attendance: 76,347
  - MVP: Larry Brown, CB (Dallas)
- World Bowl 96 – The Scottish Claymores won 32–27 over the Frankfurt Galaxy.
- Fiesta Bowl (1995 season):
  - The Nebraska Cornhuskers won 62–24 over the Florida Gators to win the national championship
- Cleveland Browns deactivate and move to Baltimore where they become the Baltimore Ravens The Browns are later reactivated in Cleveland in 1999.
- The Big 12 Conference begins with its first college football game between Texas Tech and Kansas State. Kansas State won 21–14.

== Athletics ==
- July–August – Athletics at the 1996 Summer Olympics held at Atlanta, United States

== Australian rules football ==
- Australian Football League
  - North Melbourne wins the 100th AFL premiership (North Melbourne 19.17 (131) d Sydney Swans 13.10 (88))
  - Brownlow Medal awarded to James Hird (Essendon) and Michael Voss (Brisbane Bears)
  - At the end of the season Fitzroy and the Brisbane Bears merge, forming the Brisbane Lions.

== Baseball ==
- January 8; For the first time in 25 years, no one garners 75 percent of the votes needed to be elected to the Baseball Hall of Fame. Phil Niekro comes closest with 68 percent.
- The New York Yankees won 1996 World Series defeating the Atlanta Braves.

== Basketball ==
- April 1 – NCAA Men's Basketball Championship –
  - Kentucky wins 76–67 over Syracuse
- NBA Finals –
  - Chicago Bulls win 4 games to 2 over the Seattle SuperSonics, after a record-breaking 72-10 regular season.
- The 1996 NBA draft takes place at the Continental Airlines Arena in East Rutherford, New Jersey. Tied with the 1984 and 2003 drafts, this draft is considered one of the greatest in NBA history, as it included a class of several Hall of Famers such as Kobe Bryant, Ray Allen, Allen Iverson, and Steve Nash.
- National Basketball League (Australia) Finals:
  - South East Melbourne Magic defeated the Melbourne Tigers 2–1 in the best-of-three final series.

== Boxing ==
- March 16 – Christy Martin loses to Deirdre Gogarty by a decision in six rounds to retain her Women's boxing world title in front of a national TV audience. This fight is credited with making the general public aware of women's boxing.
- March 30 to April 7 – 31st European Amateur Boxing Championships held in Vejle, Denmark
- June 7 - Oscar De La Hoya defeats Julio César Chávez by 8th round to win the WBC's world Junior Welterweight championship.

== Canadian football ==
- Grey Cup – Toronto Argonauts win 43–37 over the Edmonton Eskimos
- Vanier Cup – Saskatchewan Huskies win 31–12 over the St. Francis Xavier X-Men
- Ottawa Rough Riders fold

== Cricket ==
- Cricket World Cup – Final: Sri Lanka beat Australia by 7 wickets

== Cycling ==
- Giro d'Italia won by Pavel Tonkov of Russia
- Tour de France – Bjarne Riis of Denmark
- UCI Road World Championships – Men's road race – Johan Museeuw of Belgium

== Dogsled racing ==
- Iditarod Trail Sled Dog Race Champion –
  - Jeff King wins with lead dogs: Jake & Booster

== Field hockey ==
- Olympic Games Men's Competition: Netherlands
- Olympic Games Women's Competition: Australia

== Figure skating ==
- World Figure Skating Championships –
  - Men's champion: Todd Eldredge, United States
  - Ladies' champion: Michelle Kwan, United States
  - Pairs' champions: Marina Eltsova / Andrei Bushkov, Russia
  - Ice dancing champions: Oksana Grishuk / Evgeny Platov, Russia

== Floorball ==
- Men's World Floorball Championships
  - Champion: Sweden
- European Cup
  - Men's champion: Balrog IK
  - Women's champion: Högdalens AIS

== Gaelic Athletic Association ==
- Camogie
  - All-Ireland Camogie Champion: Galway
  - National Camogie League: Cork
- Gaelic football
  - All-Ireland Senior Football Championship – Kerry 2-9 died Mayo 1-11
  - National Football League – Derry 1-16 died Donegal 1-9
- Ladies' Gaelic football
  - All-Ireland Senior Football Champion: Monaghan
  - National Football League: Monaghan
- Hurling
  - All-Ireland Senior Hurling Championship – Wexford 1-13 died Limerick 0-14
  - National Hurling League – Galway 2–10 beat Tipperary 2–8

== Golf ==
Men's professional

- Masters Tournament - Nick Faldo
- U.S. Open - Steve Jones
- British Open - Tom Lehman
- PGA Championship - Mark Brooks
- PGA Tour money leader - Tom Lehman - $1,780,159
- Senior PGA Tour money leader - Jim Colbert - $1,627,890
- Tiger Woods turns professional in September. In the last five regular tournaments of the year on the PGA Tour, his finishes were T5-T3-1-3-1, placing him among the tour's top 30 money-winners for the year and thereby qualifying him for the season-ending The Tour Championship. Woods named the PGA Tour Rookie of the Year.

Men's amateur

- British Amateur - Warren Bladon
- U.S. Amateur - Tiger Woods becomes the first golfer to win three consecutive U.S. Amateur titles. This was the sixth consecutive year in which he won a USGA championship, one short of Bobby Jones' record of seven.
- European Amateur - Daniel Olsson

Women's professional

- Nabisco Dinah Shore - Patty Sheehan
- LPGA Championship - Laura Davies
- U.S. Women's Open - Annika Sörenstam
- Classique du Maurier - Laura Davies
- LPGA Tour money leader - Karrie Webb - $1,002,000 - becomes the first ever woman to earn more than a million dollars in one golf season.
- The United States team retained the Solheim Cup beating the European team 17 to 11.

== Handball ==
- Men's European Championship: Russia
- Women's European Championship: Denmark

== Harness racing ==
- June 22 - the fastest race mile in harness racing history was set by Jenna's Beach Boy (1:47.3) at Meadowlands Racetrack
- North America Cup - Arizona Jack
- United States Pacing Triple Crown races –
  1. Cane Pace - Scoot To Power
  2. Little Brown Jug - Armbro Operative
  3. Messenger Stakes - Go For Grins
- United States Trotting Triple Crown races –
  1. Hambletonian - Continentalvictory
  2. Yonkers Trot - Continentalvictory
  3. Kentucky Futurity - Running Sea
- Australian Inter Dominion Harness Racing Championship –
  - Pacers: Young Mister Charles
  - Trotters: Pride Of Petite

== Horse racing ==
- Inaugural running of the Dubai World Cup, promoted as the "world's richest horse race", at the Nad Al Sheba Racecourse in Dubai.

Steeplechases

- Cheltenham Gold Cup – Imperial Call
- Grand National – Rough Quest

Flat races

- Australia – Melbourne Cup won by Saintly
- Canada – Queen's Plate won by Victor Cooley
- Dubai – Dubai World Cup won by Cigar
- France – Prix de l'Arc de Triomphe won by Helissio
- Ireland – Irish Derby Stakes won by Zagreb
- Japan – Japan Cup won by Singspiel
- English Triple Crown races:
  1. 2,000 Guineas Stakes – Mark of Esteem
  2. The Derby – Shaamit
  3. St. Leger Stakes – Shantou
- United States Triple Crown races:
  1. Kentucky Derby – Grindstone
  2. Preakness Stakes – Louis Quatorze
  3. Belmont Stakes – Editor's Note
- Breeders' Cup World Thoroughbred Championships:
  1. Breeders' Cup Classic – Alphabet Soup
  2. Breeders' Cup Distaff – Jewel Princess
  3. Breeders' Cup Juvenile – Boston Harbor
  4. Breeders' Cup Juvenile Fillies – Storm Song
  5. Breeders' Cup Mile – Da Hoss
  6. Breeders' Cup Sprint – Lit de Justice
  7. Breeders' Cup Turf – Pilsudski

== Ice hockey ==
- Art Ross Trophy as the NHL's leading scorer during the regular season: Mario Lemieux, Pittsburgh Penguins
- Hart Memorial Trophy – for the NHL's Most Valuable Player: Mario Lemieux, Pittsburgh Penguins
- Stanley Cup - the Colorado Avalanche defeat the Florida Panthers 4 games to 0 for their first-ever Stanley Cup title. It was also the franchise's first season since relocating from Quebec City, where they were known as the Nordiques.
- World Cup of Hockey
  - Champion: United States defeated Canada
- World Hockey Championship
  - Men's champion: Czech Republic defeated Canada
  - Junior Men's champion: Canada defeated Sweden
- Phoenix Coyotes (now Arizona Coyotes) play inaugural season.

== Lacrosse ==
- The Buffalo Bandits defeat the Philadelphia Wings 13–12 to win the Major Indoor Lacrosse League championship

== Mixed martial arts ==
The following is a list of major noteworthy MMA events during 1996 in chronological order.

Before 1997, the Ultimate Fighting Championship (UFC) was considered the only major MMA organization in the world and featured much fewer rules then are used in modern MMA.

Date	Event	Alternate Name/s	Location	Attendance	PPV Buyrate	Notes
February 16	UFC 8: David vs. Goliath	—N/a	Bayamón, Puerto Rico	13,000	160,000	UFC rule change, timed rounds were changed to two 10-minute rounds for first two rounds of the tournament and a single 15-minute round in the tournament final and superfights. Introduction of judges. First MMA event to draw criticism from politicians.
May 17	UFC 9: Motor City Madness	—N/a	(United States) Detroit, Michigan, US	10,000	—N/a	First UFC event not to feature a tournament, however it was not the last. Closed fisted strikes to the head were banned for this event only, however this was not enforced. Following this event the UFC was removed from airing events on numerous cable systems, including TCI cable.
July 12	UFC 10: The Tournament	—N/a	(United States) Birmingham, Alabama, US	4,300	—N/a	This event was originally going to be held at the Providence Civic Center in Providence, Rhode Island.
September 20	UFC 11: The Proving Ground	—N/a	(United States) Augusta, Georgia, US	4,500	—N/a	—N/a
December 7	The Ultimate Ultimate 2	Ultimate Ultimate 1996; UFC 11.5	(United States) Birmingham, Alabama, US	6,000	—N/a	UFC rule change, introduction of "no grabbing of the fence" rule. In promotion for this event, Ken Shamrock appeared as a guest on Late Night with Conan O'Brien. Following this event Ken Shamrock would leave the UFC until 2002. And marked the last UFC fight of Don Frye.

== Professional Wrestling ==
- July 7: For the first time in 15 years, Hulk Hogan becomes a villain, and forms the New World Order alongside Scott Hall and Kevin Nash.

== Radiosport ==
- The second World Radiosport Team Championship held in San Francisco, California, US Gold medals go to Jeff Steinman KRØY and Dan Street K1TO of the United States.

== Rugby league ==
- January: England - The 1995–96 Rugby Football League season ends with Wigan declared champions.
- March 29: Paris – the new Super League competition, the first ever season of professional rugby to be played in summer, begins with new team Paris Saint-Germain's first match: a 30–24 win over Sheffield Eagles at Charlety Stadium before 17,873.
- April 27: London, England - The 1996 Challenge Cup tournament culminates in St Helens' 40–32 victory over Bradford Bulls in the final at Wembley Stadium before a crowd of 75,994.
- June 3: Sydney, Australia - The 1996 State of Origin series is wrapped up as New South Wales defeat Queensland 18–6 in Game II at the Sydney Football Stadium before a crowd of 41,955.
- June 26: Cardiff, Wales - The 1996 European Rugby League Championship is won by England who defeated Wales 26–12 at Cardiff Arms Park before a crowd of 5,245
- August 31: Salford, England - The 1996 Student Rugby League World Cup culminates in Australia's 28 - 16 defeat of Samoa
- September 29: Sydney, Australia - The 1996 ARL season culminates the Manly-Warringah Sea Eagles' 20–8 grand final victory over the St. George Dragons at the Sydney Football Stadium before a crowd of 40,985
- The 1996 Queensland Cup Season is won by the Toowoomba Clydesdales
- Super League I ends with St. Helens being crowned champions for finishing on top of the League
- The Great Britain national team go on a their tour of the Papua New Guinea, Fiji and New Zealand.

== Rugby union ==
- 102nd Five Nations Championship series is won by England
- SANZAR's new leagues the Super 12 (now Super 14) and the Tri Nations Series begin. The Super 12 is won by the Auckland Blues and the Tri Nations is won by the New Zealand All Blacks

== Snooker ==
- World Snooker Championship – Stephen Hendry beats Peter Ebdon 18-12
- World rankings – Stephen Hendry remains world number one for 1996-97

== Swimming ==
- XXVI Olympic Games, held in Atlanta United States (July 20 – July 26)
- First European SC Championships, held in Riesa, Germany (December 13 – 15)
  - Germany wins the most medals (39) and the most gold medals (14)
- December 1 – American swimmer Misty Hyman clocks 58:29 to break the world record in the women's 100m butterfly (short course)

== Tennis ==
- Grand Slam in tennis men's results:
  1. Australian Open - Boris Becker
  2. French Open - Yevgeny Kafelnikov
  3. Wimbledon championships - Richard Krajicek
  4. U.S. Open - Pete Sampras
- Grand Slam in tennis women's results:
  1. Australian Open - Monica Seles
  2. French Open - Steffi Graf
  3. Wimbledon championships - Steffi Graf
  4. U.S. Open - Steffi Graf
- 1996 Summer Olympics
  - Men's Singles Competition – Andre Agassi
  - Women's Singles Competition – Lindsay Davenport
  - Men's Doubles Competition – Todd Woodbridge & Mark Woodforde
  - Women's Doubles Competition – Gigi Fernández & Mary Joe Fernández
- Davis Cup final:
  - France wins 3–2 over Sweden
- Fed Cup final:
  - USA wins 5–0 over Spain

== Volleyball ==
- Men's World League: Netherlands
- Women's World Grand Prix: Brazil
- Olympic Games Men's Competition: Netherlands
- Olympic Games Women's Competition: Cuba

== Water polo ==
- Olympic Games Men's Competition: Spain
- Olympic Games Women's Competition: Netherlands

== Multi-sport events ==
- 1996 Summer Olympics takes place in Atlanta, United States
  - United States wins the most medals (101), and the most gold medals (44).
- Winter Asian Games held in Harbin, China
- Athletic competition in the Big 12 Conference is inaugurated with a football game between Kansas State University and Texas Tech University, in Manhattan, Kansas, on August 31.

== Awards ==
- Associated Press Male Athlete of the Year – Michael Johnson, Track and field
- Associated Press Female Athlete of the Year – Amy Van Dyken, Swimming
