= Serious Attitude =

Irish-bred Thoroughbred racehorse

- Racing silks of The Purple and Yellow Partnership/Derek J Willis and Rae Guest
- Sire: Mtoto
- Grandsire: Busted
- Dam: Zameyla
- Damsire: Cape Cross
- Sex: Mare
- Foaled: 23 March 2006
- Country: Ireland
- Colour: Bay
- Breeder: Paddy Twomey
- Owner: The Purple and Yellow Partnership; Derek J Willis & Rae Guest
- Trainer: Rae Guest
- Record: 12: 5-1-0
- Earnings: £384,303

Major wins
- Dick Poole Fillies' Stakes (2008); Cheveley Park Stakes (2008); Summer Stakes (2009); Nearctic Stakes (2009)

Serious Attitude (23 March 2006 – 25 April 2019) was an Irish-bred British-trained Thoroughbred racehorse and broodmare. A specialist sprinter, she won five of her twelve races in a racing career which lasted from August 2008 until October 2010. As a two-year-old in 2008 she was one of the best fillies of her generation in Britain, winning all three of her races including the Dick Poole Fillies' Stakes and the Cheveley Park Stakes. In the following year she disappointed in the 1000 Guineas, but won the Summer Stakes before her season was ended by injuries sustained in the Prix Maurice de Gheest. As a four-year-old she struggled to find her best form and was beaten in her first five races, before being sent to Canada where she ended her career with a win in the Nearctic Stakes. At the end of the year she was sold and exported to become a broodmare in Japan.

== Background ==
Serious Attitude is a bay mare with a white star and a white sock on her left hind leg bred in Ireland by Paddy Twomey. She was sired by Mtoto, an outstanding middle-distance performer who won the King George VI & Queen Elizabeth Stakes and two runnings of the Eclipse Stakes. As a breeding stallion, his other major winners included Shaamit, Celeric and the leading National Hunt sire Presenting. Serious Attitude's dam Zameyla showed some ability on the track, winning races at Salisbury and Leicester as a three-year-old in 2004.

In October 2007 the yearling filly was consigned to the Tattersalls sale at Newmarket and was bought for 7,500 guineas by Five Star International Bloodstock. Serious Attitude entered the ownership of The Purple and Yellow Partnership and was sent into training with Rae Guest at his Chestnut Tree Stable in Newmarket.

== Racing career ==
=== 2008: two-year-old season ===
Serious Attitude made her debut in a maiden race over six furlongs at Windsor Racecourse on 10 August and started at odds of 9/2 in a twelve-runner field. Ridden by David Probert she started slowly but moved up to take the lead approaching the final furlong before drawing away in the closing stages to win by five lengths from Kingswinford. On 4 September the filly was moved up in class for the Listed Dick Poole Fillies' Stakes at Salisbury Racecourse in which she was ridden by Jimmy Fortune. Starting the 9/2 joint-favourite against thirteen opponents she struggled to obtain a clear run in the last quarter mile before breaking clear in the final furlong to win by three lengths from Sneak Preview. After the race Rae Guest commented "She is a very nice young filly and she should get further as Jimmy has come back and said there is more to come from her on what she showed today". Shortly afterwards the ownership of the filly passed to a partnership between Guest and Derek Willis.

Four weeks after her win at Salisbury, Serious Attitude was stepped up to the highest class for the Group One Cheveley Park Stakes at Newmarket Racecourse on 3 October and started the 4/1 favourite in a field of sixteen. Her principal opponents included Infamous Angel (Lowther Stakes), Langs Lash (Queen Mary Stakes), Aspen Darlin (Firth of Clyde Stakes) and the Irish challengers Pursuit of Glory and Heart Shaped. The fillies split into two groups with Serious Attitude tracking the leaders of the far side (the right-hand side from the jockeys' viewpoint). She took the lead inside the final furlong and won by half a length from Aspen Darlin, with Pursuit of Glory and Adorn close behind in third and fourth. Guest said "She's a good two-year-old filly. Her breeder put her onto me and she's done very well. She's by Mtoto, but is very fast. Hopefully we'll go for the (1,000) Guineas but she's got so much speed I'm not sure whether she'll stay".

=== 2009: three-year-old season ===
Serious Attitude made her first appearance as a three-year-old in the 196th running of the 1000 Guineas on 3 May. Starting the 8/1 second favourite in field of fourteen she tracked the early leaders and kept on in the closing stages without ever looking likely to win and finished seventh behind Ghanaati. After a two-month break the filly returned in July and was dropped in class and distance for the Group Three Summer Stakes over six furlongs at York Racecourse in which she was matched against older fillies and mares. Ridden by Eddie Ahern she started 7/2 second favourite behind the Ballyogan Stakes winner Lesson In Humility. After tracking the leaders on the outside of the field she finished strongly to catch Lesson In Humility in the final strides and win by a head. Ahern was again in the saddle when the filly was sent to France and returned to Group One class for the Prix Maurice de Gheest over 1300 metres at Deauville Racecourse in August. After tracking the leaders she faded in the closing stages and finished eighth of the twelve runners behind King's Apostle. Guest reported that the filly had sustained muscle injuries and would miss the rest of the season.

=== 2010: four-year-old season ===
On her first appearance as a four-year-old, Serious Attitude started favourite for the Listed Kilvington Fillies' Stakes at Nottingham Racecourse in May but was beaten half a length by the five-year-old mare Prescription. She struggled when moved up to Group One class, finishing unplaced in the Golden Jubilee Stakes and the July Cup. In September she finished ninth in the Park Stakes and fifth in the Diadem Stakes.

Having failed to win in five starts in Europe, Serious Attitude was given little chance when she was sent to Canada for the Grade I Nearctic Stakes at Woodbine Racetrack on 16 October. Ridden by Garrett Gomez she started a 23.1/1 outsider and was the only female horse in a twelve-runner field. The Summer Stakes winner Bridgetown started favourite ahead of Grand Adventure (King Edward Stakes), Fatal Bullet (runner-up in the Breeders' Cup Sprint), Amico Fritz from France (Goldene Peitsche) and Balthazaar's Gift from England (Hungerford Stakes, Park Stakes). Gomez restrained the filly in the early stages and she was still only tenth as Bridgetown, Fatal Bullet and Sneaking Uponyou led the field into the straight. Serious Attitude began to make progress and was switched to the outside to deliver her challenge inside the final furlong. She took the lead 160 yards from the finish and quickly drew away to win by two and a half lengths from Grand Adventure with Fatal Bullet more than three lengths away in third. After the race Guest said "She was good all year and we knew that she had another good race in her but we were running out of opportunities at home... A lot of them were under pressure as they turned in and I thought she was travelling well – I was just worried that she wouldn't find room. I wasn't sure she would win but I knew she had plenty of horse left".

In November, the mare was auctioned at the Fasig-Tipton sale and was bought for $1,850,000 by Teruya Yoshida's Shadai Farm and exported to become a broodmare in Japan.

== Breeding record ==
Retired to become a broodmare in Japan, Serious Attitude has produced seven foals as of 2019. Serious Attitude died on 25 April 2019 after producing a stillborn foal to the cover of Orfevre.

- Anghiari, a bay colt (later gelded), foaled in 2012, sired by Zenno Rob Roy. Failed to win in twelve races.
- Supple Mind, bay filly, 2013, by Deep Impact. Won four races.
- Stiffelio, bay colt, 2014, by Stay Gold. Won eight races including Sankei Sho All Comers.
- Ever Miranda, bay filly, 2015, by Deep Impact. Failed to win in three races.
- Serious Love, bay colt, 2016, by Deep Impact. Won two races.
- Serious Fool, bay colt, 2017, by Deep Impact. Won one race.
- Lion d'Or, bay colt, 2018, by Orfevre. Won one race.

== Pedigree ==
Pedigree of Serious Attitude (IRE), bay mare, 2006
Sire Mtoto (GB) 1983	Busted (GB); 1963	Crepello	Donatello
Sire Mtoto (GB) 1983	Busted (GB); 1963	Crepello	Crepuscule
Sire Mtoto (GB) 1983	Busted (GB); 1963	Sans le Sou	Vimy
Sire Mtoto (GB) 1983	Busted (GB); 1963	Sans le Sou	Martial Loan
Sire Mtoto (GB) 1983	Amazer (FR); 1967	Mincio	Relic
Sire Mtoto (GB) 1983	Amazer (FR); 1967	Mincio	Merise
Sire Mtoto (GB) 1983	Amazer (FR); 1967	Alzara	Alycidon
Sire Mtoto (GB) 1983	Amazer (FR); 1967	Alzara	Zabara
Dam Zameyla (IRE) 2001	Cape Cross (IRE); 1994	Green Desert	Danzig
Dam Zameyla (IRE) 2001	Cape Cross (IRE); 1994	Green Desert	Foreign Courier
Dam Zameyla (IRE) 2001	Cape Cross (IRE); 1994	Park Appeal	Ahonoora
Dam Zameyla (IRE) 2001	Cape Cross (IRE); 1994	Park Appeal	Balidaress
Dam Zameyla (IRE) 2001	Angelic Sounds (IRE); 1990	The Noble Player	The Minstrel
Dam Zameyla (IRE) 2001	Angelic Sounds (IRE); 1990	The Noble Player	Noble Mark
Dam Zameyla (IRE) 2001	Angelic Sounds (IRE); 1990	Twany Angel	Double Form
Dam Zameyla (IRE) 2001	Angelic Sounds (IRE); 1990	Twany Angel	Athy Angel (Family: 6-f)
