= Chief Contender =

Irish-bred Thoroughbred racehorse

- Sire: Sadler's Wells
- Grandsire: Northern Dancer
- Dam: Minnie Hauk
- Damsire: Sir Ivor
- Sex: Stallion
- Foaled: 30 March 1993
- Country: Ireland
- Colour: Bay
- Breeder: Jayeff 'B' Stables & Calogo Bloodstock A G
- Owner: Susan Magnier, Robert Sangster & Richard Santulli
- Trainer: Peter Chapple-Hyam
- Record: 14: 4-1-4
- Earnings: £118,424

Major wins
- Grand Prix de la Region des Pays de La Loire (1996); Prix du Cadran (1997)

Chief Contender (foaled 30 March 1993) was an Irish-bred British-trained Thoroughbred racehorse who recorded his best wins in France. He showed good form as a three-year-old when he won three races including the Listed Grand Prix de la Region des Pays de La Loire and was placed in the Gordon Stakes, Prix Kergorlay and Prix de Lutèce. In the following year he ran third in the Prix Kergorlay and the Prix Gladiateur before recording his biggest win when he defeated a very strong field of stayers to take the Prix du Cadran. He was then sold and exported to Australia where he had no success.

== Background ==
Chief Contender was a bay horse bred in Ireland by Jayeff 'B' Stables & Calogo Bloodstock A G. As a yearling he was sent to the United States and offered for sale at Keeneland where he was bought for $385,000 by George Harris Bloodstock. He entered the ownership of a partnership including Susan Magnier, Robert Sangster and Richard Santulli. The colt was sent into training with Peter Chapple-Hyam at Manton, Wiltshire.

He was from the eighth crop of foals sired by Sadler's Wells, who won the Irish 2000 Guineas, Eclipse Stakes and Irish Champion Stakes in 1984 and went on to be the Champion sire on fourteen occasions. Chief Condender's dam Minnie Hauk was a daughter of the influential broodmare Best In Show, whose other descendants included El Gran Senor, Try My Best, Xaar, Jazil, Rags to Riches and Redoute's Choice. Minnie Hauk had previously produced the successful racehorse and broodmare Aviance.

== Racing career ==
=== 1996: three-year-old season ===
Chief Contender did not race as a two-year-old and began his racing career by finishing ninth in a maiden race over one and a half miles at Newmarket Racecourse on 16 April 1996. On his next appearance on 5 May the colt ran in a maiden over the same distance at Salisbury Racecourse in which he was ridden by the apprentice jockey Robert Havlin and started at odds of 10/1 in a ten-runner field. He took the lead from the start and recorded his first success as he drew away from his opponents in the final furlong came home nine lengths clear of Wilawander. Havlin was again in the saddle when Chief Contender started 5/6 favourite for a minor race over the same course and distance. The colt again made all the running and won by three and a half lengths from the Michael Stoute trained Yom Jameel. In the 1996 Epsom Derby Chief Contender started the 15/1 eighth choice in a twenty-runner field and was ridden by David Harrison. He raced close to the leaders before tiring in the last quarter mile and finishing ninth behind Shaamit, beaten nine lengths by the winner.

On 7 July Chief Contender was sent to France for the Listed Grand Prix de la Region des Pays de La Loire at Nantes in which he was again partnered by Harrison. Racing on very soft ground over 2400 metres and won by one and a half lengths from Faucon Royal. On his next race the colt contested the Group 3 Gordon Stakes (a trial race for the St Leger) over one and a half miles at Goodwood and finished and finished second, beaten a neck by St Mawes. He was back in France on 18 August for the Prix Kergorlay, a race which saw him moved up in distance to 3000 metres and matched against older horses for the first time. He disputed the lead for most of the way but came home third behind the Kassani and Nononito after tiring in the last 200 metres. His third trip to France produced a similar result as he led for most of the way in the Prix de Lutèce at Longchamp Racecourse before being overtaken in the closing stages and finishing third to Tarator. Chief Contender ended his season with a disappointing effort as he ran unplaced in the St Simon Stakes at Newbury Racecourse on 26 October.

=== 1997: four-year-old season ===
Chief Contender began his third campaign on 19 April in the John Porter Stakes at Newbury in which he finished unplaced, more than twenty lengths behind the winner Whitewater Affair. After an absence of over four months the colt returned for a second run in the Prix Kergorlay at Deauville Racecourse in August and, after disputing the lead for most of the way, took third place behind Classic Cliche and Orchestra Stall. In the Prix Gladiateur over 3100 metres at Longchamp on 7 September he came home third behind Orchestra Stall and Double Eclipse. On 4 October at Longchamp he was one of four British challengers in a seven-runner field for the Group 1 Prix du Cadran. Celeric started favourite ahead of Always Earnest (winner of the race in 1997), Persian Punch and Double Trigger with Chief Contender (ridden by Olivier Doleuze) the 11.4/1 fifth choice in the betting. After racing in third place behind Persian Punch and Double Trigger he was switched to the outside and began to stay on strongly. Chief Contender overtook Persian Punch 100 metres from the finish and held off the late challenge of Celeric to win by a neck.

Peter Chapple-Hyam had originally planned for the colt to race from the front but changed his instructions to the jockey just before the race. He explained "I was a little worried about him staying the trip in a truly run race, hence the change of plan. And early on I wasn't too happy as he had his ears flat back. He's a bit of a character at home and a hard ride, but he's a tough sort of horse and did it well in the end".

On 27 October Chief Contender was put up for auction at Tattersalls and was bought for 225,000 guinea by the bloodstock agents Cormac McCormack Associates.

Chief Contender was exported to race in Australia but made no impact, finishing tailed-off last in the Sydney Cup on 18 April 1998.

There is no record of Chief Contender standing as a breeding stallion.

== Pedigree ==
Pedigree of Chief Contender (IRE), bay colt, 1993
Sire Sadler's Wells (USA) 1981	Northern Dancer (CAN); 1961	Nearctic	Nearco (ITY)
Sire Sadler's Wells (USA) 1981	Northern Dancer (CAN); 1961	Nearctic	Lady Angela (GB)
Sire Sadler's Wells (USA) 1981	Northern Dancer (CAN); 1961	Natalma (USA)	Native Dancer
Sire Sadler's Wells (USA) 1981	Northern Dancer (CAN); 1961	Natalma (USA)	Almahmoud
Sire Sadler's Wells (USA) 1981	Fairy Bridge; 1975	Bold Reason	Hail to Reason
Sire Sadler's Wells (USA) 1981	Fairy Bridge; 1975	Bold Reason	Lalun
Sire Sadler's Wells (USA) 1981	Fairy Bridge; 1975	Special	Forli (ARG)
Sire Sadler's Wells (USA) 1981	Fairy Bridge; 1975	Special	Thong
Dam Minnie Hauk (USA) 1975	Sir Ivor; 1965	Sir Gaylord	Turn-To (IRE)
Dam Minnie Hauk (USA) 1975	Sir Ivor; 1965	Sir Gaylord	Somethingroyal
Dam Minnie Hauk (USA) 1975	Sir Ivor; 1965	Attica	Mr Trouble
Dam Minnie Hauk (USA) 1975	Sir Ivor; 1965	Attica	Athenia
Dam Minnie Hauk (USA) 1975	Best In Show; 1965	Traffic Judge	Alibhai (GB)
Dam Minnie Hauk (USA) 1975	Best In Show; 1965	Traffic Judge	Traffic Court
Dam Minnie Hauk (USA) 1975	Best In Show; 1965	Stolen Hour	Mr Busher
Dam Minnie Hauk (USA) 1975	Best In Show; 1965	Stolen Hour	Late Date (Family 8-f)
