= 1996 Epsom Derby =

217th annual running of the Derby horse race

- Location: Epsom Downs Racecourse
- Date: 8 June 1996
- Winning horse: Shaamit
- Starting price: 12/1
- Jockey: Michael Hills
- Trainer: William Haggas
- Owner: Khalifa Dasmal

Epsom Derby 1996
1-2-3
| Shaamit | Dushyantor | Shantou |

Also Ran
4-5-6
Glory Of Dancer | Alhaarth | Mystic Knight
7-8-9
Jack Jennings | Acharne | Chief Contender
10-11-12
Double Leaf | Classic Eagle | Tasdid
13-14-15
Even Top | Spartan Heartbeat | Storm Trooper
16-17-18
Zaforum | St Mawes | Busy Flight
19-20
Prince Of My Heart | Portuguese Lil | 20 Ran

The 1996 Epsom Derby was a horse race which took place at Epsom Downs on Saturday 8 June 1996. It was the 217th running of the Derby, and it was won by Shaamit. The winner was ridden by Michael Hills and trained by William Haggas. The pre-race favourite Dushyantor finished second.

== Race details ==
- Sponsor: Vodafone
- Winner's prize money: £523,100
- Going: Good (Good to Firm in places)
- Number of runners: 20
- Winner's time: 2m 35.05s

== Full result ==
| | * | Horse | Jockey | Trainer ^{†} | SP |
| 1 | | Shaamit | Michael Hills | William Haggas | 12/1 |
| 2 | 1¼ | Dushyantor | Pat Eddery | Henry Cecil | 9/2 fav |
| 3 | 1¼ | Shantou | Frankie Dettori | John Gosden | 25/1 |
| 4 | 1 | Glory of Dancer | Olivier Peslier | Paul Kelleway | 6/1 |
| 5 | hd | Alhaarth | Willie Carson | Dick Hern | 15/2 |
| 6 | 1¼ | Mystic Knight | Kevin Darley | Roger Charlton | 14/1 |
| 7 | 1 | Jack Jennings | John Reid | Bryan McMahon | 25/1 |
| 8 | 1¼ | Acharne | Warren O'Connor | Clive Brittain | 200/1 |
| 9 | 1¾ | Chief Contender | David Harrison | Peter Chapple-Hyam | 15/1 |
| 10 | ½ | Double Leaf | Johnny Murtagh | Michael Stoute | 16/1 |
| 11 | nk | Classic Eagle | Allan Mackay | Roger Harris | 200/1 |
| 12 | shd | Tasdid | Willie Supple | Kevin Prendergast (IRE) | 200/1 |
| 13 | hd | Even Top | Philip Robinson | Mark Tompkins | 11/2 |
| 14 | 6 | Spartan Heartbeat | Mark Birch | Clive Brittain | 200/1 |
| 15 | 1½ | Storm Trooper | Michael Kinane | Henry Cecil | 15/2 |
| 16 | 1¾ | Zaforum | Dane O'Neill | Les Montague Hall | 150/1 |
| 17 | 1 | St Mawes | Richard Quinn | John Dunlop | 20/1 |
| 18 | 5 | Busy Flight | Cash Asmussen | Barry Hills | 25/1 |
| 19 | 7 | Prince of My Heart | Brent Thomson | Barry Hills | 100/1 |
| 20 | 3 | Portuguese Lil (filly) | Alex Greaves | David Nicholls | 500/1 |

* The distances between the horses are shown in lengths or shorter. shd = short-head; hd = head; nk = neck.
† Trainers are based in Great Britain unless indicated.

== Winner's details ==
Further details of the winner, Shaamit:

- Foaled: 11 February 1993, in Ireland
- Sire: Mtoto; Dam: Shomoose (Habitat)
- Owner: Khalifa Dasmal
- Breeder: Khalifa Dasmal
- Rating in 1996 International Classifications: 124

== Form analysis ==
=== Two-year-old races ===
Notable runs by the future Derby participants as two-year-olds in 1995.

- Glory of Dancer – 1st Gran Criterium
- Alhaarth – 1st Vintage Stakes, 1st Solario Stakes, 1st Champagne Stakes, 1st Dewhurst Stakes
- Jack Jennings – 6th Washington Singer Stakes, 3rd Royal Lodge Stakes
- Acharne – 6th Royal Lodge Stakes
- Even Top – 1st Somerville Tattersall Stakes, 2nd Racing Post Trophy
- Storm Trooper – 2nd Autumn Stakes
- Zaforum – 4th Zetland Stakes, 8th Prix Isonomy
- Busy Flight – 2nd Haynes, Hanson and Clark Stakes, 2nd Horris Hill Stakes
- Prince of My Heart – 6th Silver Tankard Stakes

=== The road to Epsom ===
Early-season appearances in 1996 and trial races prior to running in the Derby.

- Dushyantor – 2nd Dante Stakes
- Glory of Dancer – 2nd Sandown Classic Trial, 1st Dante Stakes
- Alhaarth – 2nd Craven Stakes, 4th 2,000 Guineas
- Mystic Knight – 1st Lingfield Derby Trial
- Jack Jennings – 3rd Feilden Stakes, 3rd Dante Stakes
- Acharne – 5th Premio Parioli, 6th Lingfield Derby Trial
- Double Leaf – 4th Sandown Classic Trial, 5th Dante Stakes
- Classic Eagle – 7th Thirsk Classic Trial, 6th Chester Vase
- Tasdid – 3rd Leopardstown 2,000 Guineas Trial Stakes, 4th Amethyst Stakes
- Even Top – 2nd 2,000 Guineas
- Storm Trooper – 1st Feilden Stakes, 11th 2,000 Guineas, 6th Dante Stakes
- Zaforum – 3rd Lingfield Derby Trial
- St Mawes – 2nd Feilden Stakes, 2nd Chester Vase, 3rd Predominate Stakes
- Busy Flight – 6th Sandown Classic Trial
- Prince of My Heart – 3rd Chester Vase
- Portuguese Lil – 10th 1,000 Guineas

=== Subsequent Group 1 wins ===
Group 1 / Grade I victories after running in the Derby.

- Shantou – St. Leger (1996), Gran Premio del Jockey Club (1996), Gran Premio di Milano (1997)
- Chief Contender – Prix du Cadran (1997)
- Storm Trooper – Hollywood Invitational Turf Handicap (1998)

== Subsequent breeding careers ==
Leading progeny of participants in the 1996 Epsom Derby.

=== Sires of Classic winners ===
Alhaarth (5th)

- Haafhd - 1st 2000 Guineas Stakes (2004)
- Phoenix Reach - 1st Hong Kong Vase (2004)
- Bandari - 3rd St Leger Stakes (2002)
- Iktitaf - 1st Morgiana Hurdle (2006)

Shaamit (1st)

- Bollin Eric - 1st St Leger Stakes (2002)

=== Sires of Group/Grade One winners ===
Even Top (13th)

- Cirrus des Aigles - Champion Older Horse (2011)

=== Sires of National Hunt horses ===
Shantou (3rd)

- The Storyteller - 1st Champion Novice Chase (2018)
- Ballynagour - 1st Prix la Barka (2015)
- Beware The Bear - 1st Festival Trophy Handicap Chase (2019)
- Bun Doran - 1st Desert Orchid Chase (2019)

Dushyantor (2nd) - also shuttled to Chile

- Loosen My Load - 1st Sharp Novices' Hurdle (2009)
- Shop Dj - 2nd Champion Novice Chase (2012)

Busy Flight (18th)

- Mister Quasimodo - 3rd Desert Orchid Chase (2007)
- Impulsive Star - 1st Classic Chase (2019)

=== Other Stallions ===
Glory Of Dancer (4th) - Minor flat winners - Exported to India
Storm Trooper (15th) - Exported to India

=== Broodmare ===
Portuguese Lil (20th) - Sole runner tailed off in bumper only start
