= Millenary =

British Thoroughbred racehorse

- Sire: Rainbow Quest
- Grandsire: Blushing Groom
- Dam: Ballerina
- Damsire: Dancing Brave
- Sex: Stallion
- Foaled: 21 April 1997
- Country: Great Britain
- Colour: Bay
- Breeder: Abergwaun Farms
- Owner: Neil Jones
- Trainer: John Dunlop
- Record: 35: 12-6-8
- Earnings: £958,432

Major wins
- Chester Vase (2000); Gordon Stakes (2000); St. Leger Stakes (2000); Jockey Club Stakes (2001); Princess of Wales's Stakes (2002, 2003); Yorkshire Cup (2004); Doncaster Cup (2004, 2005); Jockey Club Cup (2004); Lonsdale Cup (2005)
- Last updated on 22 June 2007

Millenary is a retired British Thoroughbred racehorse and active sire. He won the St. Leger Stakes in 2000, and, unusually for a Classic winner, stayed in training until the age of eight, winning many important races over middle and long distances.

== Background ==
Millenary was bred by his owner, Neil Jones's Abergwaun Farms breeding operation. He was sired by the Prix de l'Arc de Triomphe winner, Rainbow Quest, out of the minor winner Ballerina. Ballerina went on to produce two other notable horses, the Princess Royal Stakes winner, Head in the Clouds, and Let The Lion Roar, who finished third in the 2004 Derby. He was trained throughout his career by John Dunlop. He was ridden in most of his races up to the end of 2003 by Pat Eddery, after which Richard Quinn was his regular jockey.

== Racing career ==
=== 1999–2000: early career ===
Unlike most racehorses, Millenary began his career in Listed races, finishing third in the Washington Singer Stakes and fifth in the Haynes, Hanson and Clark Conditions Stakes in 1999.

Dropped down to maiden race company for his three-year-old debut, he recorded a first victory at Newbury before moving into Classic contention by winning the Chester Vase. After the race, Millenary, described as "a big, gangly horse" by his trainer's representative was quoted at 25-1 for The Derby. In the event, it was Sakhee who represented the stable at Epsom with Millenary traveling to Chantilly for the Prix du Jockey-Club where he finished unplaced behind Holding Court. Returning to England, he recorded a short-head win in the Gordon Stakes, coming from last to first to catch Air Marshall close to the finish.

The St Leger involved a rematch with Air Marshall, who had gone on to win the Great Voltigeur Stakes. The two colts dominated the betting with Millenary being sent-off the 11-4 favourite ahead of Air Marshall at 3–1. The race reflected the betting, with Millenary taking the lead two furlongs out, being briefly headed by Air Marshall in the closing stages, but displaying superior stamina to stay on under pressure and win by three-quarters of a length. The winning time of 3:02.58 was the fastest for the race at Doncaster since Bahram's win in 1935, which reflected the "unremitting gallop" at which the race had been run. Despite the pace of the race and the closely contested finish, Richard Quinn felt that he had "won with a bit to spare."

=== 2001–2003: Middle distance races ===
For the next three seasons, Millenary was campaigned in top-class middle-distance events all over Europe.

His best victory in 2001 came on his debut in the Jockey Club Stakes, at Newmarket where he recorded comfortable win over Sandmason with Holding Court third and Air Marshall tailed-off in last place. The race led the BBC to suggest that he would be "a force to be reckoned with", while John Dunlop called Millenary "a lovely character and... a good ride". It proved, however, to be his only win of the season.

Millenary's most important success in 2002 came when he won the Princess of Wales's Stakes, beating the Arc runner-up Mubtaker by a neck. After the race he was a leading fancy for the King George VI and Queen Elizabeth Stakes, but John Dunlop emphasised that the horse would not be risked on firm ground. In the event, he was re-routed to Köln, where he finished third in the Aral-Pokal

In 2003 he finished first, a nose in front Loxias, in the Prix Jean de Chaudenay, but was disqualified after hanging badly to the right and interfering with the runner-up in the closing stages, despite the efforts of Pat Eddery to keep him running in a straight line. In his next race he was fitted with blinkers for the first time, and won a second Princess of Wales's Stakes with the beaten horses including the 2002 St Leger winner Bollin Eric and the leading three-year-old High Accolade (King Edward VII Stakes). It was an "impressive" performance and afterwards Eddery praised the horse, saying that "his form has been top-class this year, and he picked them up really well today".

During this period, he was also placed in important races such as the Coronation Cup, Irish St. Leger, Rheinland-Pokal, Hardwicke Stakes, Jockey Club Cup and Geoffrey Freer Stakes.

=== 2004–2006: Staying races ===
Millenary's last race of 2003, a short-head defeat to the double Champion Stayer Persian Punch in the Jockey Club Cup, indicated the direction of his future career; from 2004 onwards, he was campaigned almost exclusively at long-distance events.

In 2004, he had his greatest success since his three-year-old days. In May he won the Yorkshire Cup, "cruising" through the race and showing "a good turn of foot" to take the race by three lengths from Alcazar with the Ascot Gold Cup winner Mr Dinos well beaten. In the autumn he returned to the scene of his St Leger win and dead-heated with Kasthari in a "thrilling" race for the Doncaster Cup. A month later he was "always cantering" in the Jockey Club Cup at Newmarket before taking the lead inside the final furlong and winning by three lengths. Commenting on a "wonderful season", Dunlop said of Millenary, "He might be a seven-year-old entire, but he has retained all his ability and enthusiasm".

As an eight-year-old in 2005, he was as good again, winning the two more important staying races. At York in August for the Lonsdale Cup he was held up in last place before quickening to lead and go clear inside the final furlong, beating the odds-on favourite Distinction by two and a half lengths. "I am absolutely thrilled to bits", said Dunlop afterwards, "he has been a wonderful servant". Three weeks later he recorded his last win, again coming from last to first to win the Doncaster Cup for a second year. John Dunlop was visibly moved by the horse's victory and again paid tribute to his winner: "He's amazing...so genuine". After one more race, a third place in the Jockey Club Cup, Millenary was retired to stud.

== Assessment ==
In 2000 Millenary (116) was the highest-rated three-year-old stayer (Extended Distance division) in the International Classification drawn up by the International Classification Committee and the North American Rating Committee. This was not, however, a "World Championship", as it did not include horses from the Southern Hemisphere.

In 2004 Millenary was rated the fourth best stayer of any age in the world in the World Thoroughbred Racehorse Rankings with a rating of 117.

He was given the same rating in 2005, this time placing him third in the world in his division. His highest Timeform figure was 124.

== Stud career ==
Millenary was retired at the end of 2005 to stand at stud at the Knockhouse Stud in County Kilkenny, Ireland. He has been used as a National Hunt stallion. Millenary has proved to be a successes at stud with a healthy 33% strike rate winners to runners ratio under both Flat and National Hunt codes. His first National Hunt winner was the mare Uimhir A Seacht who won at Fontwell Racecourse in December 2012, having previously been successful in a point-to-point. His first flat winner came on 2 October 2015 at Gowran Park with the highly promising Here For The Craic. In the summer of 2015 Millenary was sold privately and it was announced that he would stand at Nunstation Stud Co Durham in the UK for the 2016 season. On 28 November 2015 at Fairyhouse in Ireland the JP McManus owned Nearly Nama'd became his first stakes winner over jumps. Millenary appears to be a true-breeding bay.

== Pedigree ==
Pedigree of Millenary (GB), bay stallion, 1997
Sire Rainbow Quest (USA) 1981	Blushing Groom; 1974	Red God	Nasrullah
Sire Rainbow Quest (USA) 1981	Blushing Groom; 1974	Red God	Spring Run
Sire Rainbow Quest (USA) 1981	Blushing Groom; 1974	Runaway Bride	Wild Rik
Sire Rainbow Quest (USA) 1981	Blushing Groom; 1974	Runaway Bride	Aimee
Sire Rainbow Quest (USA) 1981	I Will Follow; 1975	Herbager	Vandale
Sire Rainbow Quest (USA) 1981	I Will Follow; 1975	Herbager	Flagette
Sire Rainbow Quest (USA) 1981	I Will Follow; 1975	Where You Lead	Raise a Native
Sire Rainbow Quest (USA) 1981	I Will Follow; 1975	Where You Lead	Noblesse
Dam Ballerina (IRE) 1991	Dancing Brave; 1983	Lyphard	Northern Dancer
Dam Ballerina (IRE) 1991	Dancing Brave; 1983	Lyphard	Goofed
Dam Ballerina (IRE) 1991	Dancing Brave; 1983	Navajo Princess	Drone
Dam Ballerina (IRE) 1991	Dancing Brave; 1983	Navajo Princess	Olmec
Dam Ballerina (IRE) 1991	Dancing Shadow; 1977	Dancer's Image	Native Dancer
Dam Ballerina (IRE) 1991	Dancing Shadow; 1977	Dancer's Image	Noor's Image
Dam Ballerina (IRE) 1991	Dancing Shadow; 1977	Sunny Valley	Val de Loir
Dam Ballerina (IRE) 1991	Dancing Shadow; 1977	Sunny Valley	Sunland (Family: 1-l)
