= Bollin Eric =

British-bred Thoroughbred racehorse

- Sire: Shaamit
- Grandsire: Mtoto
- Dam: Bollin Zola
- Damsire: Alleged
- Sex: Stallion
- Foaled: 18 February 1999
- Died: 18 January 2020 (aged 20)
- Country: United Kingdom
- Colour: Bay
- Breeder: Sir Neil Westbrook & Lady Westbrook
- Owner: Sir Neil Westbrook
- Trainer: Tim Easterby
- Record: 18: 4-4-5
- Earnings: £506,294

Major wins
- St. Leger Stakes (2002); Lonsdale Stakes (2003)

Bollin Eric (18 February 1999 – 18 January 2020), was a British Thoroughbred racehorse and sire. In a career which lasted from July 2001 until October 2003, he ran eighteen times and won four races. He recorded his most important success when winning the Classic St. Leger Stakes as a three-year-old in 2002. He won the Lonsdale Stakes in the following year and was placed in important races including the Dante Stakes, King Edward VII Stakes, Great Voltigeur Stakes, Yorkshire Cup and Hardwicke Stakes.

== Background ==
Bollin Eric, a bay horse standing 16.2 hands high with a white blaze and four white socks, was bred by his owner, Sir Neil Westbrook and his wife Mary Fraser, daughter of Lord Strathalmond. He was by far the highest-rated horse sired by The Derby winner Shaamit and was out of the mare Bollin Zola who won two races for the Westbrooks in the late 1980s. The Westbrooks bred their horse jointly, with the colts running under the ownership of Sir Neil, while the fillies raced in Lady Westbrook's colours. All their horses carried the "Bollin" prefix taken from the River Bollin near their home in Cheshire. At stud, Bollin Zola produced at least nine other "Bollin" racehorses, the best of which was the Duke of York Stakes winner Bollin Joanne. Bollin Eric was sent into training with Tim Easterby at his Habton Grange Stable in North Yorkshire. He was ridden in twelve of his eighteen races by Kevin Darley.

== Racing career ==
=== 2001: two-year-old season ===
Bollin Eric began his racing career by finishing third in a six furlong maiden race at Doncaster in July and then finished second in a seven furlong race at Haydock Park Racecourse a month later. At the end of August, Bollin Eric started favourite for a maiden race and Beverley and recorded his first victory by taking the lead in the straight and drawing clear to win by four lengths. At the Doncaster St Leger meeting in September, Bollin Eric carried a weight of 129 pounds in a Nursery Handicap and won the one mile event by three quarters of a length. Although Bollin Eric had not raced in top class competition he was reportedly "highly thought of" by Tim Easterby.

=== 2002: three-year-old season ===
On his first start as a three-year-old, Bollin Eric was moved up in class for the Listed Feilden Stakes at Newmarket and finished third of the ten runners. Despite his defeat he was then promoted in class again to contest the Group Two Dante Stakes at York Racecourse, an important trial race for the Epsom Derby. He started at odds of 15/2 and finished second to the future Dubai World Cup winner Moon Ballad.

Bollin Eric bypassed the Derby and made his next appearance in the King Edward VII Stakes in which he finished second to Balakheri. He was then dropped back in class and started 8/15 for a Listed race at Haydock Park, but struggled to obtain a clear run and was hampered in the closing stages before finishing third to Jelani. He then finished third to Bandari in the Great Voltigeur Stakes in which the first five runners finished within a length and a half of each other.

Despite failing to win in his five previous starts, Bollin Eric's consistent performances in high-quality races, saw him being regarded as a serious contender for the St Leger at Doncaster and he started joint third favourite at odds of 7/1. Ridden by Kevin Darley, Bollin Eric was restrained towards the back of the field before being switched to the outside to challenge in the straight. He took the lead two furlongs from the finish and "kept on well" to win by one and a quarter lengths and two lengths from Highest and Bandari in what the BBC described as a "superb finish". The win provided a first Classic winner for his owner, trainer and jockey. Darley later recalled that he had personally requested the ride on Bollin Eric and described the race by saying that "once I switched him out and let him use himself it was all over". The win was warmly received by the Doncaster crowd who celebrated the first Yorkshire-trained winner of the race since Peleid in 1973.

At the end of the season, Bollin Eric was rated the best three-year-old in the world in the Extended distance division by the International Classification Committee.

=== 2003: four-year-old season ===
At four, Bollin Eric finished fourth to Warrsan in the John Porter Stakes at Newbury and second when favourite for the Yorkshire Cup. He was beaten a neck in the Hardwicke Stakes at Royal Ascot and then finished fourth to Millenary in the Princess of Wales's Stakes at Newmarket. After this race, Bollin Eric was purchased privately by Saeed Suhail. In July, Bollin Eric contested Britain's most prestigious all-aged race, the King George VI and Queen Elizabeth Stakes at Ascot in which he finished fourth of the twelve runners to Alamshar.

After five successive defeats, Bollin Eric was stepped up in distance for the two mile Lonsdale Stakes at York in which he was matched against specialist stayers including Persian Punch and Jardine's Lookout. He recorded his first win for eleven months as he took the lead a furlong from the finish and won by two lengths from Cover Up. After the race a delighted Easterby revealed that he had been "dying to run" the colt over the distance. Darley also paid tribute to the horse's consistency and said that he had been in a "different class" from the opposition. In September, Bollin Eric raced outside the United Kingdom for the first time as he was sent to the Curragh for the Irish St. Leger. He started favourite at odds of 15/8 and finished fourth to Vinnie Roe, who was recording his third consecutive win in the race. On his final start, Bollin Eric started a 33/1 outsider for the Prix de l'Arc de Triomphe and finished eighth to Dalakhani. It was the only time in his career that he finished worse than fourth.

== Stud career ==
Bollin Eric began his breeding career at the British National Stud and was later based at the Wood Farm Stud in Shropshire. In 2012 he was moved to stand at the Colmer Stud in Dorset and was marketed primarily as a National Hunt stallion. He died in January 2020 at the age of 21.

== Pedigree ==
Pedigree of Bollin Eric (GB), bay stallion 1999
| Sire Shaamit | Mtoto | Busted | Crepello |
| Sire Shaamit | Mtoto | Busted | Sans le Sou |
| Sire Shaamit | Mtoto | Amazer | Mincio |
| Sire Shaamit | Mtoto | Amazer | Alzara |
| Sire Shaamit | Shomoose | Habitat | Sir Gaylord |
| Sire Shaamit | Shomoose | Habitat | Little Hut |
| Sire Shaamit | Shomoose | Epithet | Mill Reef |
| Sire Shaamit | Shomoose | Epithet | Namecaller |
| Dam Bollin Zola | Alzao | Lyphard | Northern Dancer |
| Dam Bollin Zola | Alzao | Lyphard | Goofed |
| Dam Bollin Zola | Alzao | Lady Rebecca | Sir Ivor |
| Dam Bollin Zola | Alzao | Lady Rebecca | Pocahontas |
| Dam Bollin Zola | Sauntry | Ballad Rock | Bold Lad (IRE) |
| Dam Bollin Zola | Sauntry | Ballad Rock | True Rocket |
| Dam Bollin Zola | Sauntry | Cretia | Prince Tenderfoot |
| Dam Bollin Zola | Sauntry | Cretia | Indian Maid (Family 4-d) |
