= Maltese Women's Volleyball League =

- Current season, competition or edition: 2022–23
- Sport: Volleyball
- Founded: 1996
- First season: 1996
- No. of teams: 5 Teams
- Country: Malta
- Continent: Europe
- Domestic cups: Maltese Cup; Maltese Super Cup
- International cups: CEV Champions League; CEV Cup; CEV Challenge Cup
- Website: http://www.maltavolleyball.org

The Maltese First Division Women's Volleyball Championship is the most important national Volleyball competition organized by the Maltese Volleyball Association (MVA) among women in Malta since the year 1996.

== Competition formula ==
The first of the season 5 teams plays a preliminary round-robin tournament home and away, in which the top 4 teams in the ranking table will advance to the semis, in the Semifinals every two teams will play each other in best of three matches series and then in the final as well best of three matches will decide the champion.

== Winners list ==
Years	Champions	Runners-up	Third place
1996			
1997			PlayVolley
1998			
1999			PlayVolley
2000			
2001			PlayVolley
2002			PlayVolley
2003			PlayVolley
2004	Paola Hibs		PlayVolley
2005	Paola Hibs		PlayVolley
2006	Paola Hibs		PlayVolley
2007	Paola Hibs	PlayVolley	X-Sel Volley
2008	Paola Hibs	X-Sel Volley	PlayVolley (blue)
2009	Paola Hibs	Fleur-de-Lys	PlayVolley (blue)
2010	Paola Hibs	Flyers Depiro	Fleur-de-Lys
2011	Paola Hibs Candy	Flyers Depiro	PlayVolley
2012	Paola Hibs Candy	Fleur-de-Lys	Flyers Depiro
2013	Paola Hibs Candy	Flyers	FDL Office Group
2014	FDL Office Group	Toyota Playvolley	Flyers
2015	Fleur-De-Lys	Flyers	Paola Hibs
2016	Balzan Flyers Crosscraft	Paola	Fleur de Lys Twistees
2017	Balzan Flyers	Fleur de Lys	Paola Volley
2018	Fleur de Lys Royal Panda	Balzan Flyers Crosscraft	Paola Volley
2019	Fleur de Lys Royal Panda	Balzan Flyers	Sliema Kavallieri
2020	Competition Cancelled		
2021	Phoenix SC		
2022	Falcons VC	Phoenix SC	Balzan Flyers
2023	TBD	TBD	TBD
