= 2009 1000 Guineas =

196th 1000 Guineas Stakes
- 1000 Guineas
- Location: Newmarket Racecourse
- Date: 3 May 2009
- Winning horse: Ghanaati (USA)
- Jockey: Richard Hills
- Trainer: Barry Hills (GB)
- Owner: Hamdan Al Maktoum

The 2009 1000 Guineas Stakes was a horse race held at Newmarket Racecourse on Sunday 3 May 2009. It was the 196th running of the 1000 Guineas.

The winner was Hamdan Al Maktoum's Ghanaati, an American-bred bay filly trained at Lambourn by Barry Hills and ridden by her trainer's son Richard Hills. Hamdan Al Maktoum was winning the race for the fifth time after Salsabil (1990), Shadayid (1991), Harayir (1995) and Lahan (2000), the last two of whom were ridden by Richard Hills. Barry Hills, who retired shortly after the race, had trained Enstone Spark to win the classic in 1978. Ghanaati's win was achieved in race record time.

== The contenders ==
The race attracted a field of fourteen runners, ten trained in the United Kingdom and four in Ireland: there were no challengers from continental Europe. The odds-on favourite was the John Gosden-trained Rainbow View an undefeated, American-bred filly who was making her seasonal debut after winning the Sweet Solera Stakes, May Hill Stakes and the Fillies' Mile in 2008. Her most dangerous challenger appeared to be Cheveley Park Stakes winner Serious Attitude whilst the most-fancied of the other British-trained fillies Lahaleeb Lahaleeb, who had won the Rockfel Stakes and the Fred Darling Stakes. The Irish runners were Cuis Ghaire (Albany Stakes), Pursuit of Glory, Heart Shaped, the runner-up in the Breeders' Cup Juvenile Fillies Turf and Shimah, who had finished second to Again in the Moyglare Stud Stakes. Special Duty headed the betting at odds of 8/11 ahead of Serious Attitude (8/1) and Cuis Ghaire (12/1) with Heart Shaped and Lahaleeb on 14/1. Ghanaati, the six-length winner of a Kempton maiden race, started at 20/1.

== The race ==
The 66/1 outsider Penny's Gift took the early lead and set the pace for the first quarter-mile until she was headed by the Godolphin runner Devotee. Cuis Ghaire and Ghanaati were close behind, with Heart Shaped, Rainbow View and Serious Attitude all in touch with the leaders. The field clustered into a single group in the centre of the wide, straight course. Cuis Ghaire moved into the lead at half way, at which point the outsider Aspen Darlin was pulled up with an injury. With two furlongs left to run, Ghanaati accelerated past Cuis Ghaire to take the lead as Rainbow View and Serious Attitude began to struggle. In the final furlong, Ghanaati established a clear advantage and won by one and a half lengths from Cuis Ghaire, with the outsider Super Sleuth finishing strongly to take third by a nose from Heart Shaped. Rainbow View came next ahead of Penny's Gift and Serious Attitude. The winning time of 1:34.22 was a record for the race and was 1.66 seconds faster than that recorded by Sea The Stars in the 2000 Guineas over the same course and distance the previous day.

== Race details ==
- Sponsor: Stan James
- First prize: £227,080
- Surface: Turf
- Going: Good to Firm
- Distance: 8 furlongs
- Number of runners: 14
- Winner's time: 1:34.22

== Full result ==
| Pos. | Marg. | Horse (bred) | Jockey | Trainer (Country) | Odds |
|---|---|---|---|---|---|
| 1 | | Ghanaati (USA) | Richard Hills | Barry Hills (GB) | 20/1 |
| 2 | 1½ | Cuis Ghaire (IRE) | Kevin Manning | Jim Bolger (IRE) | 12/1 |
| 3 | 1¼ | Super Sleuth (IRE) | Martin Dwyer | Brian Meehan (GB) | 33/1 |
| 4 | nse | Heart Shaped (USA) | Johnny Murtagh | Aidan O'Brien (IRE) | 14/1 |
| 5 | hd | Rainbow View (USA) | Jimmy Fortune | John Gosden (GB) | 8/11 fav |
| 6 | hd | Penny's Gift (IRE) | Richard Hughes | Richard Hannon (GB) | 66/1 |
| 7 | 2½ | Serious Attitude (IRE) | Pat Smullen | Rae Guest (GB) | 8/1 |
| 8 | 4½ | Pursuit of Glory (IRE) | Wayne Lordan | David Wachman (IRE) | 33/1 |
| 9 | 4 | Nashmiah (IRE) | Jamie Spencer | Clive Brittain (GB) | 20/1 |
| 10 | 1 | Lahaleeb (IRE) | Darryll Holland | Mick Channon (GB) | 14/1 |
| 11 | 2½ | Shimah (USA) | Declan McDonogh | Kevin Prendergast (IRE) | 16/1 |
| 12 | 4½ | Seradim (GB) | Stéphane Pasquier | Paul Cole (GB) | 100/1 |
| 13 | 2¼ | Devotee (USA) | Frankie Dettori | Saeed bin Suroor (GB) | 50/1 |
| PU | | Aspen Darlin (IRE) | Jimmy Quinn | Alan Bailey (GB) | 40/1 |

- Abbreviations: nse = nose; nk = neck; shd = head; hd = head; dist = distance; UR = unseated rider; DSQ = disqualified; PU = pulled up

== Winner's details ==
Further details of the winner, Ghanaati

- Foaled: 6 March 2006
- Country: United States
- Sire: Giant's Causeway; Dam: Sarayir (Mr Prospector)
- Owner: Hamdan Al Maktoum
- Breeder: Shadwell Farm
