= Dick Poole Fillies' Stakes =

Flat horse race in Britain

- Class: Group 3
- Location: Salisbury Racecourse; Salisbury, England
- Race type: Flat / Thoroughbred
- Sponsor: Irish Thoroughbred Marketing
- Website: Salisbury

Race information
- Distance: 6f (1,207 metres)
- Surface: Turf
- Track: Straight
- Qualification: Two-year-old fillies
- Weight: 9 st 2 lb Penalties; 5 lb for G1 / G2 winners 3 lb for G3 winners
- Purse: £75,000 (2026); 1st: £42,533

Dick Poole Fillies' Stakes
2026
Acclamation Star	Dark Issue	Nuit D'eclair

Previous years
2025
Anthelia	Orion's Belt	Planet Seeker
2024
Tabiti	Miss Fascinator	Magic Mild
2023
Juniper Berries	Dorothy Lawrence	Soprano
2022
Juliet Sierra	All The Time	Tagline
2021
Romantic Time	Pearl Glory	Crazyland

2020-2011
2020
Happy Romance	Alcohol Free	Scarlet Bear
2019
Dark Lady	Millisle	Summer Romance
2018
Yourtimeisnow	Lady Aria	Come On Leicester
2017
Anna Nerium	Eirene	Special Purpose
2016
Madam Dancealot	Mystic Dawn	Pellucid
2015
La Rioja	Whatdoiwantthatfor	Unilit
2014
New Providence	Marsh Hawk	Stroll Patrol
2013
Joyeuse	Dorothy B	Wedding Ring
2012
Winning Express	Jadanna	Graphic Guest
2011
Sajwah	Misty Conquest	Pimpernel

2010-2001
2010
Brevity	Rimth	Margot Did
2009
Shamandar	Sweet Sonnet	Queen's Grace
2008
Serious Attitude	Sneak Preview	Seradim
2007
Fashion Rocks	Vive Les Rouges	Raymi Coya
2006
Vital Statistics	Wid	Russian Rosie
2005
Nidhaal	Saabiq	Jeanmaire
2004
Suez	Castelletto	Roodeye
2003
Nyramba	Dowager	Ruby Rocket
2002
Wimple	Ripple Effect	Ribbons And Bows
2001
Tashawak	Misterah	Aldafra

2000-1991
2000
Tempting Fate	Innit	Alshadiyah
1999
Crimplene	Forever Midnight	See You Later
1998
Imperial Beauty	Cape Grace	Intimaa
1997
Regal Revolution	Hoh Chi Min	Nanoushka
1996
Dancing Drop	Carati	Alumisiyah
1995
Najiya	White Whispers	Temptress
1994
Bajan Rose	Iltimas	Fajjoura
1993
Prophecy	Blue Siren	Crystal Magic
1992
Catherineofaragon	Seasonal Splendour	Simply Sooty
1991
Basma	High Sevens	Storm Dove

1990-1988
1990
Lee Artiste	Futuh	Almasa
1989
May Hinton	Nazela	Solo Court
1988
Dancing Tribute	Sweeping	Hufoof

The Dick Poole Stakes is a Group 3 flat horse race in Great Britain open to two-year-old fillies. It is run at Salisbury over a distance of 6 furlongs (1,207 metres), and it is scheduled to take place each year in September. It was formerly contested at Listed level and was raised to Group 3 status in 2014.

The race is named in honour of Colonel Dick Poole, a racehorse trainer, breeder and owner, and was the brainchild of Peter Walwyn and his one-time assistant Mark Smyly. It was first run in 1979, initially over a distance of 5 furlongs.

== Records ==
Leading jockey (3 wins):

- Richard Hughes - Dancing Drop (1996), Imperial Beauty (1998), Winning Express (2012)

Leading trainer (3 wins):

- John Dunlop – May Hinton (1989), Najiya (1995), Tashawak (2001)
- Richard Hannon Jr. - Anna Nerium (2017), Dark Lady (2019), Happy Romance (2020)

== Winners ==
Year	Winner	Jockey	Trainer	Time
1979	La Legende	Taffy Thomas	Henry Cecil	1:01.47
1980	Queen Of Prussia	Dean McKeown	William Hastings-Bass	1:02.23
1981	Fairy Tern	John Matthias	Ian Balding	1:00.96
1982	Miss Anagram	Billy Newnes	Henry Candy	1:00.38
1983	Boezinge	Frank Morby	Captain Mark Smyly	1:14.99
1984	All For London	Alain Lequeux	Olivier Douieb	1:15.45
1985	Ala Mahlik	Greville Starkey	Frankie Durr	1:13.77
1986	Tahilla	Pat Eddery	Jeremy Tree	1:13.43
1987	Practice	Tony Ives	Jeremy Tree	1:15.65
1988	Dancing Tribute	Walter Swinburn	Michael Stoute	1:13.37
1989	May Hinton	Willie Carson	John Dunlop	1:13.50
1990	Lee Artiste	Richard Quinn	Paul Cole	1:15.83
1991	Basma	Lester Piggott	Dick Hern	1:12.41
1992	Catherineofaragon	John Williams	Bill Wightman	1:20.41
1993	Prophecy	Pat Eddery	John Gosden	1:13.73
1994	Bajan Rose	Stephen Davies	Michael Blanshard	1:16.18
1995	Najiya	Willie Carson	John Dunlop	1:13.28
1996	Dancing Drop	Richard Hughes	Richard Hannon Sr.	1:13.48
1997	Regal Revolution	John Lowe	Peter Walwyn	1:16.79
1998	Imperial Beauty	Richard Hughes	Peter Makin	1:16.90
1999	Crimplene	Philip Robinson	Clive Brittain	1:13.28
2000	Tempting Fate	Michael Hills	John Hills	1:14.26
2001	Tashawak	Willie Supple	John Dunlop	1:14.41
2002	Wimple	Frankie Dettori	Clive Brittain	1:15.32
2003	Nyramba	Frankie Dettori	John Gosden	1:13.64
2004	Suez	Philip Robinson	Michael Jarvis	1:13.46
2005	Nidhaal	Richard Hills	Ed Dunlop	1:14.15
2006	Vital Statistics	John Egan	David Elsworth	1:13.92
2007	Fashion Rocks	Jimmy Fortune	Brian Meehan	1:15.00
2008	Serious Attitude	Jimmy Fortune	Rae Guest	1:14.62
2009	Shamandar	Michael Hills	William Haggas	1:18.65
2010	Brevity	Martin Dwyer	Brian Meehan	1:13.37
2011	Sajwah	Richard Hills	Charles Hills	1:14.54
2012	Winning Express	Richard Hughes	Ed McMahon	1:13.34
2013	Joyeuse	Tom Queally	Lady Cecil	1:14.75
2014	New Providence	Jim Crowley	Hugo Palmer	1:13.43
2015	La Rioja	Andrea Atzeni	Henry Candy	1:17.14
2016	Madam Dancealot	Tom Queally	Joseph Tuite	1:14.49
2017	Anna Nerium	Tom Marquand	Richard Hannon Jr.	1:15.30
2018	Yourtimeisnow	Andrea Atzeni	Roger Varian	1:15.01
2019	Dark Lady	Pat Dobbs	Richard Hannon Jr.	1:14.84
2020	Happy Romance	Sean Levey	Richard Hannon Jr.	1:15.11
2021	Romantic Time	Hollie Doyle	William Stone	1:13.55
2022	Juliet Sierra	Rob Hornby	Ralph Beckett	1:12.93
2023	Juniper Berries	Charles Bishop	Eve Johnson Houghton	1:12.94
2024	Tabiti	Rossa Ryan	Ralph Beckett	1:15.16
2025	Anthelia	Lewis Edmunds	Rod Millman	1:16.52
2026	Acclamation Star	Kieran Shoemark	James Owen	1:15.00

== See also ==
- Horse racing in Great Britain
- List of British flat horse races
