= 1996 Prix de l'Arc de Triomphe =

- Location: Longchamp Racecourse
- Date: October 6, 1996
- Winning horse: Helissio

The 1996 Prix de l'Arc de Triomphe was a horse race held at Longchamp on Sunday 6 October 1996. It was the 75th running of the Prix de l'Arc de Triomphe.

The winner was Helissio, a three-year-old colt trained in France by Élie Lellouche. The winning jockey was Olivier Peslier.

== Race details ==
- Sponsor: Forte Group
- Purse: 7,000,000 F; First prize: 4,000,000 F
- Going: Good to Soft
- Distance: 2,400 metres
- Number of runners: 16
- Winner's time: 2m 29.9s

== Full result ==
Pos.	Marg.	Horse	Age	Jockey	Trainer (Country)
1		Helissio	3	Olivier Peslier	Élie Lellouche (FR)
2	5	Pilsudski	4	Walter Swinburn	Michael Stoute (GB)
3	snk	Oscar Schindler	4	Cash Asmussen	Kevin Prendergast (IRE)
4	1	Swain	4	Thierry Jarnet	André Fabre (FR)
5	1½	Luna Wells	3	Thierry Thulliez	André Fabre (FR)
6	¾	Le Destin	3	Dominique Boeuf	Philippe Demercastel (FR)
7	½	Shaamit	3	Pat Eddery	William Haggas (GB)
8	½	Leeds	4	Olivier Doleuze	Henri van de Poele (FR)
9	shd	Leonila	3	Guy Guignard	Robert Collet (FR)
10	1	Pentire	4	Michael Hills	Geoff Wragg (GB)
11	snk	Darazari	3	Gérald Mossé	Alain de Royer-Dupré (FR)
12	3	Radevore	3	Sylvain Guillot	André Fabre (FR)
13	nk	Zagreb	3	Michael Kinane	Dermot Weld (IRE)
14	1½	Tamure	4	Freddy Head	John Gosden (GB)
15	15	Classic Cliche	4	Frankie Dettori	Saeed bin Suroor (GB)
SU		Polaris Flight	3	John Reid	Peter Chapple-Hyam (GB)

- Abbreviations: shd = short-head; snk = short-neck; nk = neck; SU = slipped up

== Winner's details ==
Further details of the winner, Helissio.

- Sex: Colt
- Foaled: 24 January 1993
- Country: France
- Sire: Fairy King; Dam: Helice (Slewpy)
- Owner: Enrique Sarasola
- Breeder: Ecurie Skymarc Farm
