= Celeric =

British Thoroughbred racehorse

- Sire: Mtoto
- Grandsire: Busted
- Dam: Hot Spice
- Damsire: Hotfoot
- Sex: Gelding
- Foaled: 28 April 1992
- Country: United Kingdom
- Colour: Bay
- Breeder: Chieveley Manor Enterprises
- Owner: Christopher Spence
- Trainer: David Morley; John Dunlop
- Record: 42: 13-7-5
- Earnings: £ 469,666

Major wins
- Northumberland Plate (1996); Lonsdale Stakes (1996, 1999); Jockey Club Cup (1996); Yorkshire Cup (1997); Ascot Gold Cup (1997); Sagaro Stakes (1999)

Awards
- European Champion Stayer (1997)
- Last updated on August 25, 2007

Celeric (/səˈlɛrɪk/) is a retired, British Thoroughbred racehorse. He improved from running in minor handicaps to Group One level, and recorded his most important win in the 1997 Ascot Gold Cup. In the same year he was named European Champion Stayer at the Cartier Racing Awards. He won thirteen of his forty-two races in a career which lasted from 1994 until his retirement at the age of eight in 2000. Together with Double Trigger, Kayf Tara and Persian Punch he was one of a group of horses credited with revitalising the staying division in the 1990s.

== Background ==
Celeric, a bay gelding with a white stripe was bred by the Chievely Manor Stud, a tiny operation based in the "back garden" of his owner Christopher Spence. His sire Mtoto was an outstanding middle-distance horse winning the Eclipse Stakes twice and the King George VI and Queen Elizabeth Stakes. At stud Mtoto sired the winners of more than five hundred races including The Derby winner Shaamit and the leading National Hunt sire Presenting. He was notable as an influence for stamina, with the average winning distance of his progeny being 11.5 furlongs.

Celeric's dam Hot Spice was unraced, but was a successful broodmare: in addition to Celeric she produced the St. Simon Stakes winner Sesame and the successful handicapper Turmeric. Hot Spice's foals were all given herb or spice related names with others including Camomile and Zucchini. Celeric's name was reported to be a misspelling of Celeriac.

Celeric was trained by David Morley until the trainer's death in January 1998. He was then moved to the Arundel stable of John Dunlop. His most regular jockey was Pat Eddery who rode him in eighteen races. Celeric was known as a "tricky customer" who tended to stop when in front, and therefore needed to be ridden with skill and timing.

== Racing career ==
=== 1994–1995: early career ===
Celeric's racing career began when he finished last of the seven runners in a maiden race at Kempton in August. In three other races as a two-year-old he finished no better than fourth.

In 1995, Celeric was immediately sent over extended distances and on his debut he won his first race, a handicap over thirteen furlongs at Warwick. Celeric improved steadily throughout the year, and won minor handicap races at Nottingham, Newbury and York. At the last venue he gave thirteen pounds to the future Champion Hurdler Istabraq and won by a head. Celeric's handicap mark improved from 75 to 90, suggesting that although useful, he was around 15 pounds below Group class.

=== 1996: four-year-old season ===
In 1996 Celeric was ridden in seven of his eight races by the veteran Willie Carson and improved into a top class stayer. He won once from his first three starts and then recorded his first important win carrying 130lbs to victory in the Northumberland Plate at Newcastle in June. Two weeks later he moved up to Listed class for the first time and won Foster's Silver Cup at York. He was held up in the early stages before accelerating in the straight and winning by one and a half lengths

The same tactics were employed in the Lonsdale Stakes at York, and Celeric won by two lengths, with the Goodwood Cup winner Grey Shot in fourth. Another step up in class followed, as Celeric next ran in the Group Three Doncaster Cup for which he was made second favourite. Celeric stayed on well in the race but could never get on terms with Double Trigger and finished second, beaten two lengths.

Celeric's final start of the season came in the Group Three Jockey Club Cup at Newmarket for which he started at 11/4 against a field which included Further Flight, who was attempting to win the race for a fifth time and the future dual Champion Stayer Persian Punch. Ridden by Richard Hills, Celeric tracked the leaders before moving easily up to challenge in the last quarter mile. He took the lead inside the final furlong and was driven out to hold the renewed challenge of the Ebor Handicap winner Sanmartino by a head and record his first Group win.

=== 1997: five-year-old season ===
Celeric's championship season began with a fourth place in the Jockey Club Stakes over a mile and a half in May. Less than two weeks later he returned to extended distances in the Yorkshire Cup for which he was made second favourite behind the St Leger and Ascot Gold Cup winner Classic Cliche. Held up as usual, Celeric showed "courage" to match his "turn of foot" as he "squeezed" through a gap to take the lead inside the final furlong and ran on under pressure to beat Mons by a short head, with Classic Cliche finishing last of the nine runners. On his final trial for the Gold Cup, Celeric finished second to Persian Punch in the Henry II Stakes at Sandown, beaten three quarters of a length when attempting to give seven pounds to the younger gelding.

The field for the Gold Cup at Royal Ascot in June was unusually strong. Apart from Classic Cliche, Double Trigger and Persian Punch, Celeric's rivals also included the Cartier Award winning stayers Moonax and Nononito. Celeric's task was made more difficult when the ground at Ascot was softened by heavy rain. Celeric was held up in last place by Pat Eddery in the early stages as Grey Shot and Double Trigger made the running. Classic Cliche took over the lead in the straight as Eddery moved Celeric up to challenge. Celeric caught Classic Cliche well inside the last furlong and ran on under pressure to win by three quarters of a length. Eddery was singled out for praise in timing Celeric's challenge to perfection: the gelding disliked being in front and had to be produced as late as possible.

Celeric was dropped down to a mile and a half to finish fifth in the Princess of Wales's Stakes at Newmarket, but then disappointed when favourite for the Lonsdale Stakes, finishing fourth to Double Eclipse. On his final start of the season he was sent to France and was made odds-on favourite for the Prix du Cadran. He challenged strongly in the straight but was beaten a neck by Chief Contender.

=== 1998–2000: later career ===
Following the death of David Morley in January, Celeric was sent to be trained by Morley's "great friend" John Dunlop.

Celeric failed to win in six races in 1998. In the first half of the year he was well below his best when finishing unplaced in three races including the Ascot Gold Cup.

His form improved later in the season as he finished third to Double Trigger in the Goodwood Cup, second to Persian Punch in the Lonsdale Stakes and second to Arctic Owl in the Jockey Club Cup. His effort in the Lonsdale Stakes was his best performance as he was beaten a short head when attempting to give six pounds to the winner. It was described as "a contest to make any pulse quicken."

Celeric began 1999 by recording his first win for twenty-two months. In the Sagaro Stakes at Ascot he was held up patiently by Richard Quinn (Pat Eddery was suspended) before "pouncing" inside the final furlong and being pushed out to beat Shaya by one and a half lengths. He finished fifth in his next start, when made favourite for the Henry II Stakes.

Celeric produced a "noble" effort to finish fourth of seventeen runners in the Gold Cup, but then finished sixth of seven behind Kayf Tara when joint favourite for the Goodwood Cup. Celeric was becoming unpredictable, and Dunlop considered running him in blinkers. In the Lonsdale Stakes in August, Celeric started at 10/1 and scored his last victory. Pat Eddery held the gelding up before moving steadily forward to take the lead inside the final furlong. Celeric ran on strongly under pressure to beat Arctic Owl by a length and take the race for a second time. The Racing Post described Celeric as "back to his thrilling best."

In Autumn Celeric finished third in the Doncaster Cup but on his last start of the year he was very disappointing, finishing a remote last of the three runners in the Jockey Club Cup.

Celeric failed to find his best form in 2000. He finished third in the Sagaro Stakes on his debut, but after unplaced runs in the Yorkshire Cup and the Ascot Gold Cup he was retired from racing. Announcing the decision in late June, Christopher Spence said, "He's given us more fun than you could ever imagine, and we've been very lucky to have had him."

== Assessment ==
At the 1997 Cartier Racing Awards, Celeric was named European Champion Stayer. In the official International Classification, however, he was ranked below Classic Cliche.

In the Classification for 1998, he was again rated the second best European stayer on 119, one pound below Kayf Tara.

== Retirement ==
After the end of his racing career, Celeric was retired to his birthplace, the Chievely Manor Stud near Newbury, Berkshire, where he was reported to be enjoying an active retirement.

== Pedigree ==
Pedigree of Celeric (GB), bay gelding, 1992
Sire Mtoto (GB) 1983	Busted; 1963	Crepello	Donatello
Sire Mtoto (GB) 1983	Busted; 1963	Crepello	Crepuscule
Sire Mtoto (GB) 1983	Busted; 1963	Sans le Sou	Vimy
Sire Mtoto (GB) 1983	Busted; 1963	Sans le Sou	Martial Loan
Sire Mtoto (GB) 1983	Amazer; 1967	Mincio	Relic
Sire Mtoto (GB) 1983	Amazer; 1967	Mincio	Merise
Sire Mtoto (GB) 1983	Amazer; 1967	Alzara	Alycidon
Sire Mtoto (GB) 1983	Amazer; 1967	Alzara	Zabara
Dam Hot Spice (IRE) 1978	Hotfoot; 1966	Firestreak	Pardal
Dam Hot Spice (IRE) 1978	Hotfoot; 1966	Firestreak	Hot Spell
Dam Hot Spice (IRE) 1978	Hotfoot; 1966	Pitter Patter	Kingstone
Dam Hot Spice (IRE) 1978	Hotfoot; 1966	Pitter Patter	Rain
Dam Hot Spice (IRE) 1978	Persian Market; 1972	Taj Dewan	Prince Taj
Dam Hot Spice (IRE) 1978	Persian Market; 1972	Taj Dewan	Devinette
Dam Hot Spice (IRE) 1978	Persian Market; 1972	Londonderry Air	Ballymoss
Dam Hot Spice (IRE) 1978	Persian Market; 1972	Londonderry Air	Martial Air (Family: 1-w)
