= Lonsdale Cup =

Flat horse race in Britain

- Class: Group 2
- Location: York Racecourse; York, England
- Race type: Flat / Thoroughbred
- Sponsor: Weatherbys
- Website: York

Race information
- Distance: 2m 56y (3,270 metres)
- Surface: Turf
- Track: Left-handed
- Qualification: Three-years-old and up
- Weight: 8 st 8 lb (3yo); 9 st 5 lb (4yo+); Allowances; 3 lb for fillies and mares Penalties; 3 lb for Group 1 winners* * after 2024
- Purse: £250,000 (2025); 1st: £141,775

Lonsdale Cup
2026
Al Nayyir	Illinois	Mount Atlas

Previous years
2025
Trawlerman	Sweet William	Al Nayyir
2024
Vauban	Al Nayyir	Gregory
2023
Coltrane	Courage Mon Ami	Giavellotto
2022
Quickthorn	Coltrane	Reshoun
2021
Stradivarius	Spanish Mission	The Grand Visir

2020-2011
2020
Enbihaar	Stratum	Nayef Road
2019
Stradivarius	Dee Ex Bee	Il Paradiso
2018
Stradivarius	Count Octave	Idaho
2017
Montaly	Dartmouth	St Michel
2016
Quest For More	Pallasator	Wicklow Brave
2015
Max Dynamite	Mizzou	Hidden Gold
2014
Pale Mimosa	Estimate	Times Up
2013
Ahzeemah	Simenon	Times Up
2012
Times Up	High Jinx	Lost In The Moment
2011
Opinion Poll	Duncan	Bergo

2010-2001
2010
Opinion Poll	Samuel	King Of Wands
2009
Askar Tau	Drill Sergeant	Royal And Regal
2007
Septimus	Balkan Knight	Anna Pavlova
2006
Sergeant Cecil	Franklins Gardens	The Whistling Teal
2005
Millenary	Distinction	Songlark
2004
First Charter	Dancing Bay	Millenary
2003
Bollin Eric	Cover Up	Zindabad
2002
Boreas	Cover Up	Darasim
2001
Persian Punch	Jardines Lookout	Qaatef

2000-1991
2000
Royal Rebel	Rainbow High	Ski Run
1999
Celeric	Arctic Owl	Rainbow High
1998
Persian Punch	Celeric	Maridpour
1997
Double Eclipse	Samraan	Windsor Castle
1996
Celeric	Always Aloof	Sanmartino
1995
Double Eclipse	Cuff Link	Always Aloof
1994
My Patriarch	Cuff Link	Further Flight
1993
Further Flight	Silverdale	Allegan
1992
Further Flight	Landowner	Tyrone Bridge
1991
Supreme Choice	Retouch	Bondstone

1990-1988
1990
Chelsea Girl	Tyrone Bridge	Wajna
1989
Weld	Demawend	Clifton Chapel
1988
Dam Busters	Guarde Royale	Sergeyevich

The Lonsdale Cup is a Group 2 flat horse race in Great Britain open to horses aged three years or older. It is run at York over a distance of 2 miles and 56 yards (3,270 metres), and it is scheduled to take place each year in August.

== History ==
The event was first run over 2 miles in 1962 and was a handicap until 1981, when it became a conditions race renamed the Lonsdale Stakes. For a period its distance was 1 mile, 7 furlongs and 198 yards (1.9875 miles or 3198m). It was classed as a Listed race for several years, and it was promoted to Group 3 level in 1998.

The race was renamed the Lonsdale Cup and given Group 2 status in 2004. It was extended by 78 yards in 2007 to its current distance.

The Lonsdale Cup is currently held on the third day of York's four-day Ebor Festival meeting, with the leading horses from the race often going on to compete in the following month's Doncaster Cup.

== Records ==
Most successful horse since 1962 (3 wins):

- Stradivarius - 2018, 2019, 2021

Leading jockey since 1962 (7 wins):

- Frankie Dettori - Sergeant Cecil (2006), Opinion Poll (2010, 2011), Max Dynamite (2015), Stradivarius (2018, 2019, 2021)

Leading trainer since 1962 (5 wins):

- John Dunlop – Angel City (1987), My Patriarch (1994), Celeric (1999), Millenary (2005), Times Up (2012)
- John Gosden - Stradivarius ( 2018, 2019, 2021), Enbihaar (2020), Trawlerman (2025)

== Winners since 1962 ==
Year	Winner	Age	Jockey	Trainer	Time
1962	Parthaon	3	Ron Hutchinson	Jack Jarvis	3:32.60
1963	Tanavar	3	Johnny Greenaway	Bill Elsey	3:33.80
1964	Roman Scandal	4	Doug Smith	Jack Watts	3:33.80
1965	French Patrol	4	Lionel Brown	Peter Easterby	3:35.20
1966	Mintmaster	5	Lester Piggott	A Cooper	3:38.60
1967	Zaloba	5	George Moore	Cecil Boyd-Rochfort	3:37.80
1968	Brave Pat	5	Eric Eldin	Ryan Jarvis	3:39.20
1969	Panco	4	Taffy Thomas	Ryan Jarvis	3:34.20
1970	Whindamus	3	Frankie Durr	Ron Smyth	3:26.80
1971	Cossall	4	Eddie Hide	Ryan Jarvis	3:34.90
1972	B Major	5	Willie Carson	Gordon Smyth	3:27.90
1973	Wolverene	3	Willie Carson	Doug Smith	3:34.15
1974	Party Time	5	Bruce Raymond	Michael Jarvis	3:34.73
1975	T.V. Sunday	3	Willie Carson	Barry Hills	3:27.15
1976	Coed Cochion	4	Paul Cook	Jeremy Hindley	3:27.14
1977	Belfalas	4	Willie Carson	Dick Hern	3:25.73
1978	Moonlight Rag	5	Philip Waldron	Henry Candy	3:30.22
1979	Elusive	5	Kipper Lynch	Bruce Hobbs	3:29.83
1980	Heighlin	4	Richard Fox	David Elsworth	3:33.91
1981	Donegal Prince	5	Lester Piggott	Paul Kelleway	3:38.55
1982	Capricorn Line	4	Lester Piggott	Luca Cumani	3:30.19
1983	Crusader Castle	4	Pat Eddery	Ian Balding	3:30.55
1984	Spicy Story	3	Pat Eddery	Ian Balding	3:27.88
1985	Inde Pulse	3	Paul Cook	Frankie Durr	3:37.76
1986	Valuable Witness	6	Pat Eddery	Jeremy Tree	3:26.38
1987	Angel City	3	Willie Carson	John Dunlop	3:34.29
1988	Dam Busters	3	Bryn Crossley	Maureen Piggott	3:18.49
1989	Weld	3	Bruce Raymond	William Jarvis	3:23.15
1990	Chelsea Girl	4	Willie Carson	Michael Jarvis	3:24.40
1991	Supreme Choice	3	Darryll Holland	Barry Hills	3:30.07
1992	Further Flight	6	Michael Hills	Barry Hills	3:25.64
1993	Further Flight	7	Michael Hills	Barry Hills	3:26.54
1994	My Patriarch (Note: Cuff Link finished first in 1994, but he was relegated to second place following a stewards' inquiry)	4	Pat Eddery	John Dunlop	3:20.85
1995	Double Eclipse	3	Tyrone Williams	Mark Johnston	3:22.78
1996	Celeric	4	Willie Carson	David Morley	3:20.33
1997	Double Eclipse	5	Michael Roberts	Mark Johnston	3:29.91
1998	Persian Punch	5	Richard Quinn	David Elsworth	3:24.62
1999	Celeric	7	Pat Eddery	John Dunlop	3:23.03
2000	Royal Rebel	4	Michael Kinane	Mark Johnston	3:28.21
2001	Persian Punch	8	Richard Quinn	David Elsworth	3:23.47
2002	Boreas	7	Jamie Spencer	Luca Cumani	3:23.08
2003	Bollin Eric	4	Kevin Darley	Tim Easterby	3:23.25
2004	First Charter	5	Kieren Fallon	Sir Michael Stoute	3:25.94
2005	Millenary	8	Richard Quinn	John Dunlop	3:22.71
2006	Sergeant Cecil	7	Frankie Dettori	Rod Millman	3:28.47
2007	Septimus	4	Johnny Murtagh	Aidan O'Brien	3:38.82
2008	Abandoned due to waterlogging
2009	Askar Tau	4	Ryan Moore	Marcus Tregoning	3:30.63
2010	Opinion Poll	4	Frankie Dettori	Michael Jarvis	3:34.84
2011	Opinion Poll	5	Frankie Dettori	Mahmood Al Zarooni	3:32.48
2012	Times Up	6	William Buick	John Dunlop	3:34.64
2013	Ahzeemah	4	Silvestre de Sousa	Saeed bin Suroor	3:34.75
2014	Pale Mimosa	5	Pat Smullen	Dermot Weld	3:31.52
2015	Max Dynamite	5	Frankie Dettori	Willie Mullins	3:33.09
2016	Quest For More	6	George Baker	Roger Charlton	3:32.57
2017	Montaly	6	P. J. McDonald	Andrew Balding	3:31.06
2018	Stradivarius	4	Frankie Dettori	John Gosden	3:29.70
2019	Stradivarius	5	Frankie Dettori	John Gosden	3:27.06
2020	Enbihaar	5	Jim Crowley	John Gosden	3:33.57
2021	Stradivarius	7	Frankie Dettori	John and Thady Gosden	3:30.87
2022	Quickthorn	5	Tom Marquand	Hughie Morrison	3:28.20
2023	Coltrane	6	Oisin Murphy	Andrew Balding	3:27.92
2024	Vauban	6	William Buick	Willie Mullins	3:28.54
2025	Trawlerman	7	William Buick	John and Thady Gosden	3:29.04
2026	Al Nayyir	8	William Buick	Tom Clover	3:35.52

== See also ==
- Horse racing in Great Britain
- List of British flat horse races
