= 1996 Cheltenham Gold Cup =

The 1996 Cheltenham Gold Cup was a horse race which took place at Cheltenham on Thursday March 14, 1996. It was the 69th running of the Cheltenham Gold Cup, and it was won by Imperial Call. The winner was ridden by Conor O'Dwyer and trained by Fergie Sutherland. The pre-race favourite One Man finished sixth. There was one fatality in the race when Monsieur Le Cure ridden by Jason Titley took a heavy fall at the 6th fence breaking his neck.

Imperial Call was the first winner of the Gold Cup trained in Ireland since Dawn Run in 1986.

== Race details ==
- Sponsor: Tote
- Winner's prize money: £131,156.00
- Going: Good
- Number of runners: 10
- Winner's time: 6m 42.4s

== Full result ==
	*	Horse	Age	Jockey	Trainer ^{†}	SP
1		Imperial Call	7	Conor O'Dwyer	Fergie Sutherland (IRE)	9/2
2	4	Rough Quest	10	Mick Fitzgerald	Terry Casey	12/1
3	19	Couldn't Be Better	9	Graham Bradley	Charlie Brooks	11/1
4	3	Barton Bank	10	Tony McCoy	David Nicholson	16/1
5	nk	Young Hustler	9	Chris Maude	Nigel Twiston-Davies	25/1
6	8	One Man	8	Richard Dunwoody	Gordon W. Richards	11/8 fav
7	17	King of the Gales	9	Charlie Swan	John Kiely (IRE)	50/1
PU	Fence 21	Dublin Flyer	10	Brendan Powell	Tim Forster	5/1
PU	Fence 15	Lord Relic	10	David Bridgwater	Martin Pipe	100/1
Fell	Fence 6	Monsieur Le Cure	10	Jason Titley	John Edwards	14/1

* The distances between the horses are shown in lengths or shorter. nk = neck; PU = pulled-up.
† Trainers are based in Great Britain unless indicated.
Note: Fence 16 was omitted due to the fatal fall of Monsieur Le Cure on the first circuit.

== Winner's details ==
Further details of the winner, Imperial Call:

- Foaled: February 21, 1989, in Ireland
- Sire: Callernish; Dam: Princess Menelek (Menelek)
- Owner: Lisselan Farms Ltd
- Breeder: Tom O'Donnell
