= Mtoto =

British Thoroughbred racehorse

- Sire: Busted
- Grandsire: Crepello
- Dam: Amazer
- Damsire: Mincio
- Sex: Stallion
- Foaled: 1 April 1983
- Died: 2011
- Country: Great Britain
- Colour: Bay
- Breeder: John L. Moore
- Owner: Ahmed Al Maktoum
- Trainer: Alec Stewart
- Record: 17: 8-4-1
- Earnings: £833,638

Major wins
- Brigadier Gerard Stakes (1987); Prince of Wales's Stakes (1987, 1988); Eclipse Stakes (1987, 1988); Festival Stakes (1988); K. George VI & Q. Elizabeth Stakes (1988); Select Stakes (1988)
- Last updated on 2 January 2008

Mtoto (1 April 1983 – 24 May 2011) was a British Thoroughbred racehorse. In a career which lasted from 1985 until 1988, he ran ten times and won seven races. He showed some promise as three-year-old in 1986, but emerged as a top-class horse in 1987 when he defeated The Derby winner Reference Point in the Eclipse Stakes at Sandown. In 1988, he was the dominant middle-distance horse in Britain, winning a second Eclipse Stakes and taking the King George VI and Queen Elizabeth Stakes.

== Background ==
Bred by John L. Moore, Mtoto was a bay horse with a white blaze. He was sired by the 1967 British Horse of the Year Busted out of the French mare Amazer.

== Racing career ==
He recovered so well from the foot problems which dogged his early career that when he went to stud, he did so as the winner of the King George VI and Queen Elizabeth Stakes, and double winner of both the Eclipse Stakes and Prince of Wales's Stakes. He very nearly added the Prix de l'Arc de Triomphe to this list too. Mtoto got off to a slow start on the track. By the end of his three-year-old campaign, he had won only once, and that was a small maiden race at Haydock Park. His first important success came as a four-year-old in the Brigadier Gerard Stakes at Sandown Park. In his final year, 1988, he ended a previously unbeaten season with an unlucky, fast closing neck second to Tony Bin in the Arc. Jockey Michael Roberts was blamed by many for poor positioning in this final race, Mtoto rounding the home turn into a short straight behind a wall of horses, in one of the largest Arc fields ever assembled.

== Stud career ==
Mtoto stood at Aston Upthorpe Stud at a fee of £18,000, where he sired Shaamit, Celeric, Serious Attitude and many other horses including Presenting, Arbatax and Maylane. He was retired from stud duties in 2006 and spent his retirement at Aston Upthorpe alongside Zilzal. Mtoto is grandsire to the 2008 Cheltenham Gold Cup winner Denman and 2011 Grand National winner Ballabriggs. On 24 May 2011 it was announced that Mtoto had died aged 28. Later taken as the name of a restored steam tractor (i.e. traction engine) built by John Fowler (Leeds).

== Pedigree ==
Pedigree of Mtoto bay stallion 1983
Sire Busted (GB) 1963	Crepello (GB); 1954	Donatello	Blenheim
Sire Busted (GB) 1963	Crepello (GB); 1954	Donatello	Delleana
Sire Busted (GB) 1963	Crepello (GB); 1954	Crepuscule	Mieuxce
Sire Busted (GB) 1963	Crepello (GB); 1954	Crepuscule	Red Sunset
Sire Busted (GB) 1963	Sans le Sou (FR); 1957	Vimy	Wild Risk
Sire Busted (GB) 1963	Sans le Sou (FR); 1957	Vimy	Mimi
Sire Busted (GB) 1963	Sans le Sou (FR); 1957	Martial Loan	Court Martial
Sire Busted (GB) 1963	Sans le Sou (FR); 1957	Martial Loan	Loan
Dam Amazer (FR) 1967	Mincio (FR); 1957	Relic	War Relic
Dam Amazer (FR) 1967	Mincio (FR); 1957	Relic	Bridal Colours
Dam Amazer (FR) 1967	Mincio (FR); 1957	Merise	Le Pacha
Dam Amazer (FR) 1967	Mincio (FR); 1957	Merise	Miraflore
Dam Amazer (FR) 1967	Alzara (GB); 1961	Alycidon	Donatello
Dam Amazer (FR) 1967	Alzara (GB); 1961	Alycidon	Aurora
Dam Amazer (FR) 1967	Alzara (GB); 1961	Zabara	Persian Gulf
Dam Amazer (FR) 1967	Alzara (GB); 1961	Zabara	Samovar (Family 1-k)
