= Ghanaati =

American-bred Thoroughbred racehorse (2006–2026)

- Racing colours of Hamdan Al Maktoum
- Sire: Giant's Causeway
- Grandsire: Storm Cat
- Dam: Sarayir
- Damsire: Mr. Prospector
- Sex: Mare
- Foaled: 28 March 2006
- Died: July 2026 (aged 20)
- Country: United States
- Colour: Bay
- Breeder: Shadwell Farm
- Owner: Hamdan Al Maktoum
- Trainer: Barry Hills
- Record: 6: 3-1-2

Major wins
- 1000 Guineas (2009); Coronation Stakes (2009)

Ghanaati (28 March 2006 – July 2026) was an American-bred, British-trained Thoroughbred racehorse. In a racing career which lasted from September 2008 and October 2009 she ran six times and won three races. After winning one minor race as a two-year-old she won the Classic 1000 Guineas at Newmarket Racecourse on her first appearance in 2009. She then won the Coronation Stakes at Royal Ascot and placed in both the Sussex Stakes at Goodwood and the Sun Chariot Stakes at Newmarket before being retired at the end of the season.

== Background ==
Ghanaati was a "big, strong", dark-coated bay mare bred by her owner, Hamdan Al Maktoum's Shadwell Farm at Lexington, Kentucky. Her dam, Sarayir won three races, and as a daughter of the mare Height of Fashion, was a sister of Nashwan, Unfuwain and Nayef. In addition to Ghanaati, Sarayir produced the Cumberland Lodge Stakes winner Mawatheeq. As a descendant of the 1000 Guineas winner Highclere, Ghanaati is also closely related to the Japanese champion Deep Impact. Ghanaati's sire, the 2000 European Horse of the Year Giant's Causeway has, as of 2012, sired the winners of more than 20 Group One/Grade I races and more than £5,000,000 in prize money. He was Leading sire in North America in 2009 and 2010.

She was trained by Barry Hills at Lambourn and ridden in five of her six races by her trainer's son Richard. The filly's name is Arabic and means "my love".

== Racing career ==
Ghanaati began her racing career on the Polytrack surface at Kempton Park in the autumn of 2008. On her debut in September, she started slowly before finishing third in a seven furlong maiden race. Five weeks later, racing over the same course and distance, Ghanaati started 4/6 favourite for a similar event. After starting slowly again, she recovered to take the lead in the straight and drew clear to win very easily by six lengths.

She did not race as a three-year-old before contesting the 1000 Guineas over the Rowley Mile at Newmarket on 3 May. She was not considered a major contender and started at odds of 20/1 in a field fourteen fillies with Rainbow View being made the 8/11 favourite. Richard Hills positioned the filly among the leaders from the start before going to the front in the final quarter mile. Ghanaati quickly went clear and was not seriously challenged, winning by one and a half lengths from the Irish-trained Cuis Ghaire. The previously unbeaten Rainbow View finished fifth, with her connections claiming that she was unsuited by the exceptionally firm ground. The winning time of 1:34.22 was a record for the race and was 1.66 seconds faster than that recorded by Sea the Stars in the 2000 Guineas over the same course and distance the previous day. Shortly after the race Barry Hills became seriously ill with blood poisoning and the day-to-day supervision of Ghanaati's training was taken on by his son Charlie Hills.

On 19 June Ghanaati was matched against the Poule d'Essai des Pouliches winner Elusive Wave and the Irish 1,000 Guineas winner Again in the Coronation Stakes at Royal Ascot. Ghanaati was made 2/1 favourite with Elusive Wave starting at 4/1. The race was an unusually rough one, with several collisions between the horses early in the straight. Ghanaati survived a bump two furlongs from the finish before taking the lead and winning comfortably by two lengths from Raggane. According to the Racing Post she was "never in danger" and "always in command" in the closing stages. Her winning time of 1:38.42 was a record for Ascot's round mile course. As her owner felt that she had little to prove against three-year-old fillies, Ghanaati was then tried against colts and older horses in the Sussex Stakes at Goodwood in July. She started 2/1 second favourite but was well beaten and finished third behind Rip Van Winkle and Paco Boy. After the race, Charlie Hills expressed the view that Ghanaati had run well in what was described as a "vintage" running of the Group One event.

Ghanaati was then rested until October when she contested the Sun Chariot Stakes, over the same course and distance as the 1000 Guineas and started 6/5 favourite. She led the race a furlong from the finish but was overtaken and beaten one and a half lengths by the French-trained four-year-old Sahpresa, who recorded the first of her three wins in the race.

== Death ==
On 28 July 2026, it was announced that Ghanaati had died at the age of 20.

== Assessment and honours ==
In the 2009 World Thoroughbred Rankings, Ghanaati was given a rating of 118, making her the seventh highest-rated three-year-old filly in the world. She was the highest rated three-year-old filly over one mile on turf.

== Stud record ==
At the end of her racing career, Ghanaati became a broodmare for Shadwell Farms. In her first three years at stud she was covered by the stallions Dansili, Dubawi and Oasis Dream.

2011 ALMUHALAB (GB): Bay colt (gelded), foaled 15 February, by Dansili (GB) – won once and placed four times from 22 starts in Britain to date (15/05/17) 2013–16

2012 ALNASHAMA (GB): Bay colt (gelded), foaled 24 February, by Dubawi (IRE) – won 4 races and placed 6 times from 17 starts in Britain to date (15/05/17) 2014–17

2013

2014 AFAAK (GB): Bay colt, foaled 3 March, by Oasis Dream (GB) – won 2 races and placed fourth once from 3 starts in England to date (5/06/17) in 2017

2015 Wafy bay gelding by Dubawi winner

2016 Alandalos bay mare by Invincible Spirit (IRE) winner

2017 Covered by Muhaarar (GB) in 2016

2018 Mutasaabeq horse by Invincible Spirit winner

2019 Maghlaak gelding by Muhaarar Winner

== Pedigree ==
Pedigree of Ghanaati (USA), bay mare, 2006
Sire Giant's Causeway (USA) 1997	Storm Cat; 1983	Storm Bird	Northern Dancer
Sire Giant's Causeway (USA) 1997	Storm Cat; 1983	Storm Bird	South Ocean
Sire Giant's Causeway (USA) 1997	Storm Cat; 1983	Terlingua	Secretariat
Sire Giant's Causeway (USA) 1997	Storm Cat; 1983	Terlingua	Crimson Saint
Sire Giant's Causeway (USA) 1997	Mariah's Storm; 1991	Rahy	Blushing Groom
Sire Giant's Causeway (USA) 1997	Mariah's Storm; 1991	Rahy	Glorious Song
Sire Giant's Causeway (USA) 1997	Mariah's Storm; 1991	Immense	Roberto
Sire Giant's Causeway (USA) 1997	Mariah's Storm; 1991	Immense	Imsodear
Dam Sarayir (USA) 1994	Mr. Prospector; 1970	Raise a Native	Native Dancer
Dam Sarayir (USA) 1994	Mr. Prospector; 1970	Raise a Native	Raise You
Dam Sarayir (USA) 1994	Mr. Prospector; 1970	Gold Digger	Nashua
Dam Sarayir (USA) 1994	Mr. Prospector; 1970	Gold Digger	Sequence
Dam Sarayir (USA) 1994	Height of Fashion; 1979	Bustino	Busted
Dam Sarayir (USA) 1994	Height of Fashion; 1979	Bustino	Ship Yard
Dam Sarayir (USA) 1994	Height of Fashion; 1979	Highclere	Queen's Hussar
Dam Sarayir (USA) 1994	Height of Fashion; 1979	Highclere	Highlight (Family: 2-f)
