= Persian Punch =

Irish-bred Thoroughbred racehorse

- Sire: Persian Heights
- Dam: Rum Cay
- Damsire: Our Native
- Sex: Gelding
- Foaled: 13 April 1993
- Country: Ireland
- Colour: Chestnut
- Breeder: Adstock Manor Stud
- Owner: Jeff Smith
- Trainer: David Elsworth
- Record: 63: 20-8-11
- Earnings: £1,008,785

Major wins
- Bahrain Trophy (1996); Henry II Stakes (1997, 1998, 2000); Sagaro Stakes (1998); Lonsdale Cup (1998, 2001); Prix Kergorlay (2000); Goodwood Cup (2001, 2003); Jockey Club Cup (2000, 2002, 2003); Doncaster Cup (2003)

Awards
- European Champion Stayer (2001, 2003)

Honours
- Statue at Newmarket Racecourse
- Last updated on January 22, 2009

Persian Punch (1993–2004) was a Thoroughbred racehorse trained in the United Kingdom. He was frequently heralded by the Racing Post and his fans as the most popular horse in training during the final years of his career and had his own fan club and website.

He was sired by Persian Heights and was out of Rum Cay who was trained by Roger Curtis at Lambourn, Berkshire. He had a half brother by Mozart, Classic Punch.

Persian Punch was trained throughout his racing career by David Elsworth at Whitsbury Manor Racing Stables, Fordingbridge, Wiltshire, England. His most famous stablemate was Desert Orchid, retired by then but still leading out the 2 year olds. Persian Punch was owned by Jeff Smith, owner of Littleton Stud, whose silks had been carried by many famous racehorses including Lochsong and Chief Singer. Persian Punch's lad was Derek Brown.

Persian Punch won 20 races and was placed in 19 of his 63 races, amassing total prize money of over £1million. Although he never won a Group 1 race (he was placed), he won 13 European Pattern races, equalling the record of Ardross, Acatenango and Brigadier Gerard.

At the age of 10, he was just denied the Stayers Triple Crown of Goodwood Cup, Ascot Gold Cup, and Doncaster Cup when Mr Dinos beat him into 2nd place at Ascot. He won three Jockey Club Cups, a Doncaster Cup, two Goodwood Cups, three Henry II Stakes, and two Lonsdale Cups.

Persian Punch also travelled to Australia on two occasions, and finished third in the 1998 and 2001 Melbourne Cups.

He earned the 2001 and 2003 Cartier Award for Top Stayer.

Persian Punch died on 28 April 2004, when he collapsed at the end of the Sagaro Stakes at Ascot. His fan club contacted Newmarket Racecourse, where he had his most wins and his last victory, to request a memorial there to him. The Persian Punch Memorial Fund was founded, and a lifesize bronze by Philip Blacker was unveiled on the anniversary of his last win. This was mostly funded by Jeff Smith, but fans were given the opportunity to contribute and their names are displayed on a plaque.

== See also ==
- Repeat winners of horse races
