= Shaamit =

Irish-bred Thoroughbred racehorse

- Racing colours of Khalifa Dasmal
- Sire: Mtoto
- Grandsire: Busted
- Dam: Shomoose
- Damsire: Habitat
- Sex: Colt
- Foaled: 10 February 1993
- Country: Ireland
- Colour: Bay
- Breeder: Khalifa Dasmal
- Owner: Khalifa Dasmal
- Trainer: William Haggas
- Record: 6: 2-0-1
- Earnings: £585,959

Major wins
- Epsom Derby (1996)
- Last updated on November 22, 2006

Shaamit (1993–2001) was an Irish-bred, British-trained Thoroughbred race horse and sire. In a career which lasted from September 1995 to October 1996, he ran six times and won twice. He was the winner of the Epsom Derby in 1996. He was retired to stud at the end of his three-year-old season where he had limited success. He died in 2001.

== Background ==
Shaamit was bred by his owner Khalifa Dasmal. He was foaled on 11 February 1993, sired by Mtoto out of the mare Shomoose. Mtoto was a highly successful middle-distance racehorse who won the Eclipse Stakes in 1987 and 1988 and the King George VI and Queen Elizabeth Stakes in 1988. Shaamit's dam Shomoose was by the sprinter Habitat. At stud, Mtoto sired the European Champion Stayer Celeric and the leading National Hunt stallion Presenting.

Shaamit was trained throughout his career by William Haggas at Newmarket. He was ridden by Michael Hills in four of his six races, including both of his victories, and in his other two races by the eleven times Champion Jockey Pat Eddery.

== Racing career ==
=== 1995:two-year-old season ===
Shaamit made his first racecourse appearance in a maiden race at Newmarket on 25 September 1995. He started at odds of 20/1 and showed some inexperience ("ran green") in finishing fourth of the twenty runners. On 4 November, he reappeared in another maiden race over one mile at Doncaster and started 13/8 favourite in a field of twenty-three. He took the lead a furlong from the finish and won by three and a half lengths.

=== 1996:three-year-old season ===
Shaamit was not among the original entries for the 1996 Epsom Derby. In April, Haggas's father-in-law Lester Piggott rode the colt in an exercise gallop and described the colt as "marvellous" and a potential Derby winner. As a result, Shaamit was added to the Derby field as a supplementary entry. It was intended that the colt would make his seasonal debut in the Dante Stakes at York, but he was withdrawn after sustaining a foot injury.

Shaamit started at odds of 12/1 for the 1996 Epsom Derby on 8 June on his first appearance of the season. The race was run at the unusually early time of 2.25pm to avoid a clash with the opening game of the 1996 European Football Championship, which featured the England national football team, leading some commentators to claim that the race lacked its usual atmosphere and sense of occasion. Shaamit was the sixth choice in the betting, with Dushyantor being sent off the 9/2 favourite in a field of twenty runners. He was attempting to become the second horse in consecutive years to win the Derby on his seasonal debut, following Lammtarra in 1995. Ridden by Hills, he raced in the middle of the field for most of the way before turning into the straight in sixth place. He was then switched to the outside and made rapid progress to take the lead a furlong and a half from the finish. He went clear and stayed on well in the closing stages to hold off the fast finish of Dushyantor and win by 1 1/4, with Shantou a further 1 1/4 lengths back in third.

Shaamit did not run again for seven weeks before he reappeared in the King George VI and Queen Elizabeth Stakes at Ascot on 27 July. He was made 2/1 favourite in a field of eight runners, despite the fact that Michael Hills had elected to ride the four-year-old Pentire who had finished second to Lammtarra in the 1995 running of the race. Ridden by Pat Eddery, Shaamit had every chance in the straight but finished third behind Pentire and the St Leger winner Classic Cliche. Haggas made no excuses for Shaamit's defeat, saying that his colt was "just not good enough". Three weeks after his defeat at Ascot, Shaamit was sent off the 5/4 favourite for the Irish Champion Stakes at Leopardstown. He was unable to quicken in the straight and finished a "tame" fourth to the filly Timarida, beaten just over three lengths.

On 6 October, Shaamit started at odds of 22/1 in the Prix de l'Arc de Triomphe. He finished seventh of the sixteen starters behind Helissio.

== Assessment ==
In their book A Century of Champions, John Randall and Tony Morris rated Shaamit a "poor" Derby winner.

== Race record ==
Date	Race	Dist (f)	Course	Class	Prize (£K)	Odds	Runners	Placing	Margin	Time	Jockey	Trainer
26 September 1995	Soltykoff Maiden Stakes	8	Newmarket	M	5	20/1	20	4	3.75	1:40.50	Michael Hills	William Haggas
4 November 1995	Sureflow Maiden Stakes	8	Doncaster	M	4	13/8	23	1	3.5	1:39.20	Michael Hills	William Haggas
8 June 1996	Epsom Derby	12	Epsom Downs	1	523	12/1	20	1	0.75	2:35.05	Michael Hills	William Haggas
27 July 1996	King George VI and Queen Elizabeth Stakes	12	Ascot	1	294	2/1	8	3	2	2:28.10	Pat Eddery	William Haggas
14 September 1996	Irish Champion Stakes	10	Leopardstown	1	94	5/4	6	4	2	2:06.20	Michael Hills	William Haggas
6 October 1996	Prix de l'Arc de Triomphe	12	Longchamp	1	527	22/1	16	7	9	2:29.90	Pat Eddery	William Haggas

== Retirement and progeny ==
He was retired to the National Stud where in 1998 he became the first European horse to serve as a shuttle stallion to South Africa. He subsequently moved to Scarvagh House Stud, County Down, Northern Ireland where he died of a ruptured stomach on 7 April 2001. By far the best of his progeny was his son Bollin Eric who won the St. Leger in 2002. His most successful National Hunt horse was the mare Shaddiva, winner of six races

== Pedigree ==
Pedigree of Shaamit
Sire Mtoto	Busted	Crepello	Donatello II
Sire Mtoto	Busted	Crepello	Crepuscule
Sire Mtoto	Busted	Sans Le Sou	Vimy
Sire Mtoto	Busted	Sans Le Sou	Martial Loan
Sire Mtoto	Amazer	Mincio	Relic
Sire Mtoto	Amazer	Mincio	Merise
Sire Mtoto	Amazer	Alzara	Alycidon
Sire Mtoto	Amazer	Alzara	Zabara
Dam Shomoose	Habitat	Sir Gaylord	Turn-to
Dam Shomoose	Habitat	Sir Gaylord	Somethingroyal
Dam Shomoose	Habitat	Little Hut	Occupy
Dam Shomoose	Habitat	Little Hut	Savage Beauty
Dam Shomoose	Epithet	Mill Reef	Never Bend
Dam Shomoose	Epithet	Mill Reef	Milan Mill
Dam Shomoose	Epithet	Namecaller	Malicious
Dam Shomoose	Epithet	Namecaller	Fools Folly
