= 2009 Epsom Derby =

- Location: Epsom Downs Racecourse
- Date: 6 June 2009
- Winning horse: Sea the Stars
- Starting price: 11/4
- Jockey: Michael Kinane
- Trainer: John Oxx
- Owner: Christopher Tsui

Epsom Derby 2009
1–2–3
Sea The Stars	Fame And Glory	Masterofthehorse

Also Ran
4–5–6
Rip Van Winkle	Golden Sword	Crowded House
7–8–9
Age of Aquarius	Debussy	Kite Wood
10–11–12
Black Bear Island	Gan Amhras	Montaff

The 2009 Epsom Derby was a horse race which took place at Epsom Downs on Saturday 6 June 2009. It was the 230th running of the Derby, and it was won by Sea the Stars. The winner was ridden by Michael Kinane and trained by John Oxx. The pre-race favourite Fame and Glory finished second.

== Race details ==
- Sponsor: Investec
- Winner's prize money: £709,625
- Going: Good
- Number of runners: 12
- Winner's time: 2m 36.74s

== Full result ==
	*	Horse	Jockey	Trainer ^{†}	SP
1		Sea the Stars	Michael Kinane	John Oxx (IRE)	11/4
2	1¾	Fame and Glory	Seamie Heffernan	Aidan O'Brien (IRE)	9/4 fav
3	nk	Masterofthehorse	Richard Hughes	Aidan O'Brien (IRE)	16/1
4	nse	Rip Van Winkle	Johnny Murtagh	Aidan O'Brien (IRE)	6/1
5	shd	Golden Sword	Colm O'Donoghue	Aidan O'Brien (IRE)	25/1
6	6	Crowded House	Jamie Spencer	Brian Meehan	20/1
7	½	Age of Aquarius	Pat Smullen	Aidan O'Brien (IRE)	25/1
8	nk	Debussy	Jimmy Fortune	John Gosden	33/1
9	4½	Kite Wood	Frankie Dettori	Saeed bin Suroor	28/1
10	hd	Black Bear Island	Ryan Moore	Aidan O'Brien (IRE)	7/1
11	5	Gan Amhras	Kevin Manning	Jim Bolger (IRE)	8/1
12	11	Montaff	Richard Hills	Mick Channon	40/1

* The distances between the horses are shown in lengths or shorter – nse = nose; shd = short-head; hd = head; nk = neck
† Trainers are based in Great Britain unless indicated

== Winner's details ==
Further details of the winner, Sea the Stars:

- Foaled: 6 April 2006 in Ireland
- Sire: Cape Cross; Dam: Urban Sea (Miswaki)
- Owner: Christopher Tsui
- Breeder: Sunderland Holdings Ltd
- Rating in 2009 World Thoroughbred Rankings: 136

== Form analysis ==
=== Two-year-old races ===
Notable runs by the future Derby participants as two-year-olds in 2008.

- Sea the Stars – 1st Beresford Stakes
- Fame and Glory – 1st Critérium de Saint-Cloud
- Masterofthehorse – 3rd Beresford Stakes, 11th Racing Post Trophy
- Rip Van Winkle – 1st Tyros Stakes, 7th Dewhurst Stakes
- Crowded House – 2nd Tattersalls Million, 1st Racing Post Trophy
- Age of Aquarius – 4th Critérium de Saint-Cloud
- Kite Wood – 1st Autumn Stakes
- Gan Amhras – 2nd Goffs (C & G) Million

=== The road to Epsom ===
Early-season appearances in 2009 and trial races prior to running in the Derby.

- Sea the Stars – 1st 2,000 Guineas
- Fame and Glory – 1st Ballysax Stakes, 1st Derrinstown Stud Derby Trial
- Masterofthehorse – 2nd Chester Vase
- Rip Van Winkle – 4th 2,000 Guineas
- Golden Sword – 4th Prix Noailles, 1st Chester Vase
- Crowded House – 8th Dante Stakes
- Age of Aquarius – 1st Lingfield Derby Trial
- Debussy – 1st Blue Riband Trial Stakes, 3rd Chester Vase
- Kite Wood – 5th Dante Stakes
- Black Bear Island – 3rd Prix La Force, 1st Dante Stakes
- Gan Amhras – 3rd 2,000 Guineas
- Montaff – 2nd Lingfield Derby Trial

=== Subsequent Group 1 wins ===
Group 1 / Grade I victories after running in the Derby.

- Sea the Stars – Eclipse Stakes (2009), International Stakes (2009), Irish Champion Stakes (2009), Prix de l'Arc de Triomphe (2009)
- Fame and Glory – Irish Derby (2009), Tattersalls Gold Cup (2010), Coronation Cup (2010), Ascot Gold Cup (2011)
- Rip Van Winkle – Sussex Stakes (2009), Queen Elizabeth II Stakes (2009), International Stakes (2010)
- Debussy – Arlington Million (2010)

== Subsequent breeding careers ==
Leading progeny of participants in the 2009 Epsom Derby.

=== Sires of Classic winners ===
Sea The Stars (1st) Sire of fourteen individual Group/Grade One winners including six classic winners as of August 2020

- Taghrooda - 1st Epsom Oaks (2014)
- Sea The Moon - 1st Deutsches Derby (2014)
- Harzand - 1st Epsom Derby, 1st Irish Derby (2016)
- Sea Of Class - 1st Irish Oaks (2018)
- Star Catcher - 1st Irish Oaks (2019)
- Stradivarius - Champion Stayer (2018, 2019)

=== Sires of Group/Grade One winners ===
Rip Van Winkle (4th) - Later exported to New Zealand

- Dick Whittington - 1st Phoenix Stakes (2014)
- Te Akau Shark - 1st Chipping Norton Stakes (2020)
- Jennifer Eccles - 1st New Zealand Oaks (2020)
- Winston C - 1st New York Turf Writers Cup (2019)

=== Sires of National Hunt horses ===
Fame And Glory (2nd)

- Gardons Le Sourire - 1st Prix Ferdinand Dufaure (2020), 1st Prix Jean Stern (2020)
- Commander Of Fleet - 2nd Spa Novices' Hurdle (2019)
- Embittered - 3rd County Handicap Hurdle (2020)

=== Other Stallions ===
Masterofthehorse (3rd) - Flat and jumps winners
Golden Sword (5th) - Exported to South Africa
Crowded House (6th) - Exported to Australia
