= Sans Frontieres =

Irish-bred Thoroughbred racehorse

- Sire: Galileo
- Grandsire: Sadler's Wells
- Dam: Llia
- Damsire: Shirley Heights
- Sex: Stallion
- Foaled: 6 April 2006
- Country: Ireland
- Colour: Chestnut
- Breeder: Lavington Stud
- Owner: Robert Ogden
- Trainer: Jeremy Noseda
- Record: 9: 4-1-1
- Earnings: £253,449

Major wins
- Princess of Wales's Stakes (2010); Geoffrey Freer Stakes (2010); Irish St. Leger (2010)

Sans Frontieres (foaled 6 April 2006) is an Irish-bred, British-trained Thoroughbred racehorse and sire. In his first two seasons he showed promise but was restricted to only three races in total owing to injuries. As a four-year-old in 2010 he emerged as a top-class performer over middle and long distances, winning the Princess of Wales's Stakes and Geoffrey Freer Stakes in England and then recording his biggest victory in his final race when he took the Irish St. Leger at the Curragh. Leg injuries kept him off the course for the next two years before he was retired to become a breeding stallion.

== Background ==
Sans Frontieres is a chestnut horse with a white blaze and four white socks bred in Ireland by the Lavington Stud. As a yearling he was offered for sale at Tattersalls in October 2007 and was bought for 450,000 guineas by the bloodstock agent John Warren. He entered the ownership of Sir Robert Ogden, best known as an owner of National Hunt horses including See More Business, Voy Por Ustedes and Exotic Dancer. The colt was sent into training with Jeremy Noseda at Newmarket.

He was sired by Galileo, who won the Derby, Irish Derby and King George VI and Queen Elizabeth Stakes in 2001 before becoming a very successful breeding stallion. Galileo's other progeny include Cape Blanco, Frankel, Nathaniel, New Approach, Rip Van Winkle, Found, Minding and Ruler of the World. Sans Frontieres' dam Llia, who won one minor race and finished third in the Pretty Polly Stakes, and produced seer other winners including Hans Holbein (Chester Vase) and Kootenay (Princess Elizabeth Stakes). Llia was a distant female-line descendant of the broodmare Clarence (foaled 1934), and was therefore related to many leading winners including Sun Chariot and Santa Claus.

== Racing career ==
=== 2008: two-year-old season ===
Sans Frontieres began his racing career in a maiden race over seven furlongs at Lingfield Park on 1 September in which he started the 5/6 favorite against nine opponents. Ridden by Shane Kelly, he took the lead inside the final furlong and won from Rafaan, Admiral Duque and Beat Up in a "blanket finish" which saw the first four finishing within half a length of each other.

=== 2009: three-year-old season ===
On his three-year-old debut Sans Frontieres was ridden by Johnny Murtagh in the Craven Stakes (a trial race for the 2000 Guineas) over one mile at Newmarket Racecourse on 16 April in which he at odds of 12/1 and finished second of the seven runners behind the odds-on favourite Delegator. On 14 May at York Racecourse the colt was stepped up in distance for the Dante Stakes, a major trial for The Derby in which he was partnered by Mick Kinane. After racing towards the rear of the field he stayed on strongly in the straight to take third place beat three quarters of a length and a head by the Aidan O'Brien-trained colts Black Bear Island and Freemantle. Sans Frontieres had training problem after his run in the Dante and missed the rest of the season.

=== 2010: four-year-old season ===
After a break of eleven months, Sans Frontieres returned in the Group 3 Earl of Sefton Stakes over nine furlongs at Newmarket in April in which he was partnered by Frankie Dettori and finished sixth of the eight-runner behind Sri Putra. In the Huxley Stakes at Chester Racecourse in May he again failed to make much impact and finished sixth behind Debussy.

At Royal Ascot on 19 June the colt was ridden by Tom Queally when he was stepped up in distance and started a 25/1 outsider for the Hardwicke Stakes over one and a half miles. He never looked likely to win but kept on well in the closing stages to finish fourth behind Harbinger despite having some problems obtaining clear run in the straight. Nineteen days after his run at Ascot Sans Frontieres, with Queally again in the saddle, started at odds of 14/1 in an eight-runner field for the Princess of Wales's Stakes on good to firm ground at Newmarket. Spanish Moon started favourite while the other runners included Crowded House, Holberg (winner of the Queen's Vase), Tazeez (Earl of Sefton Stakes) and Man of Iron. After being restrained by Queally in the early stages he moved up to take the lead approaching the final furlong and stayed on well to win by two and a half lengths from the Barry Hills-trained Redwood, with another two and a half lengths back to Tazeez in third place. After the race Jeremy Noseda said "I came here thinking he'd finish in the three but I didn't think he'd beat Spanish Moon. But if Spanish Moon didn't perform, he'd have as good a chance as anything. I didn't expect to win, so hadn't looked much beyond today, but hopefully there will be a better day ahead".

In the Group 2 Geoffrey Freer Stakes on softer ground at Newbury Racecourse Sans Frontieres was ridden by Murtagh and started the 3/1 second choice in the betting behind the Godolphin representative Kite Wood, the winner of the race in 2009. The other six runners included Laaheb (Fred Archer Stakes) and Golden Sword (Chester Vase). After tracking the leaders Sans Frontieres went to the front approaching the final furlong and drew away to win by two and a quarter lengths from Laaheb despite hanging to the right. Noseda commented "To be honest I was very worried about the ground but I chatted to Sir Robert Ogden and we decided to go for it. I was fairly worried he wouldn't go on it, but we had to find out today because we've had the Irish St. Leger on our minds and there's a good chance it will be soft there. So it will be the Irish St. Leger next and hopefully after that, we can have a tilt at the Melbourne Cup".

As predicted, Sans Frontieres was next sent to Ireland and was moved up in class and distance for the Group 1 Irish St. Leger over one and three quarter miles at the Curragh on 11 September. Ridden by Olivier Peslier he was made the 13/8 favourite against seven runners headed by the six-year-old mare Profound Beauty whose wins included the Curragh Cup and two editions of the Ballyroan Stakes. Kite Wood was again in opposition, as well as Tactic (Curragh Cup) and the Japanese challenger Pop Rock. The outsider Lady Lupus set the pace and saw off a short-lived challenge from Tactic to lead the field into the straight. Peslier meanwhile, had settled his mount in seventh place before moving up on the outside entering the straight. Profound Beauty went to the front a furlong and a half out but was soon joined by Sans Frontieres who gained the advantage before drawing ahead to win "comfortably" by three quarters of a length. Robert Ogden's racing manager Barry Simpson said "He didn't like the ground at all, but he did his best bit of work ever last week and I know Jeremy would have thought him a certainty on good ground, but all the rain dampened our enthusiasm", before going on to echo Noseda's statement that the Melbourne Cup was a likely target.

After some deliberation, the horse went into quarantine in preparation for a trip to Australia. The plans were abandoned, however, after he developed a muscular problem ("azoturia") following a training gallop on 5 October.

=== Retirement ===
Sans Frontieres sustained a tendon injury in 2011 which kept him off the track for the whole of the year. Noseda persevered with the horse but when the injury recurred in 2012, Sans Frontieres was retired from racing. The trainer commented "He was due to run at Newbury later this month and had been working very well, showing his customary dash. So it is a great shame that he has had a recurrence of a tendon injury. Sans Frontieres was a very talented horse who, without question, would have won more Group 1s with a little more luck."

== Stud career ==
Sans Frontieres began his stud career at the Coolmore organisation's Beeches Stud in County Waterford where he is marketed as a National Hunt stallion.

== Pedigree ==
Pedigree of Sans Frontieres (IRE), chestnut stallion, 2006
Sire Galileo (IRE) 1998	Sadler's Wells (USA); 1981	Northern Dancer	Nearctic
Sire Galileo (IRE) 1998	Sadler's Wells (USA); 1981	Northern Dancer	Natalma
Sire Galileo (IRE) 1998	Sadler's Wells (USA); 1981	Fairy Bridge	Bold Reason
Sire Galileo (IRE) 1998	Sadler's Wells (USA); 1981	Fairy Bridge	Special
Sire Galileo (IRE) 1998	Urban Sea (USA); 1989	Miswaki	Mr. Prospector
Sire Galileo (IRE) 1998	Urban Sea (USA); 1989	Miswaki	Hopespringseternal
Sire Galileo (IRE) 1998	Urban Sea (USA); 1989	Allegretta	Lombard
Sire Galileo (IRE) 1998	Urban Sea (USA); 1989	Allegretta	Anatevka
Dam Llia (GB) 1992	Shirley Heights (GB); 1975	Mill Reef	Never Bend
Dam Llia (GB) 1992	Shirley Heights (GB); 1975	Mill Reef	Milan Mill
Dam Llia (GB) 1992	Shirley Heights (GB); 1975	Hardiemma	Abdos
Dam Llia (GB) 1992	Shirley Heights (GB); 1975	Hardiemma	Kelty
Dam Llia (GB) 1992	Llyn Gwynant (IRE); 1972	Persian Bold	Bold Lad (IRE)
Dam Llia (GB) 1992	Llyn Gwynant (IRE); 1972	Persian Bold	Relkarunner
Dam Llia (GB) 1992	Llyn Gwynant (IRE); 1972	Etoile des Galles	Busted
Dam Llia (GB) 1992	Llyn Gwynant (IRE); 1972	Etoile des Galles	Welsh Star (Family 3-o)
