= 2009 in sports =

2009 in sports describes the world events in sport.

== Alpine skiing ==
- 2009 Winter Universiade held in Harbin,China
- Alpine World Ski Championships 2009 held in Val d'Isère, Savoy, France

== American football ==
- Super Bowl XLIII – the Pittsburgh Steelers (AFC) won 27–23 over the Arizona Cardinals (NFC)
  - Location: Raymond James Stadium
  - Attendance: 70,774
  - MVP: Santonio Holmes, WR (Pittsburgh)
- BCS National Championship Game at Orange Bowl (2008 season):
  - The Florida Gators won 24-14 over the Oklahoma Sooners in front of a record crowd of 78,468 to win the BCS National Championship
- September 20 – The Dallas Cowboys play their first game in the new Cowboys Stadium against the New York Giants and lose 31–33. The game drew an NFL record regular-season crowd of over 105,000.
- September 27 – Detroit Lions defeat the Washington Redskins to end a 19-game losing streak dating back to December 2007. This tied the 1942–45 Chicago Cardinals (who suspended independent operations in 1944) and the 1961–62 Oakland Raiders for the second longest such streak after the 1976–77 Tampa Bay Buccaneers.
- October 8 – The United Football League made its debut.
- November 27 – In the first UFL Championship Game, the Las Vegas Locomotives defeat the previously unbeaten Florida Tuskers 20–17 in overtime.

== Association football ==
- Shakhtar Donetsk win the UEFA Cup after beating Werder Bremen 2–1 in extra time of the 2009 UEFA Cup Final in Istanbul.
- FC Barcelona win the UEFA Champions League after beating Manchester United 2–0 in the 2009 UEFA Champions League Final in Rome.
- Estudiantes win the Copa Libertadores after beating Cruzeiro 4–1 on points.
- Brazil win the 2009 FIFA Confederations Cup after beating the United States 3–2 in the final in Johannesburg, South Africa.
- Mexico win the 2009 CONCACAF Gold Cup after beating the United States 5–0 in the final in East Rutherford, United States.
- Ghana win the 2009 FIFA U-20 World Cup after beating Brazil 4–3 in penalties (the match ended 0–0) in the final in Cairo, Egypt.
- Switzerland win the 2009 FIFA U-17 World Cup after beating Nigeria 1–0 in the final in Abuja, Nigeria.
- FC Barcelona win the 2009 FIFA Club World Cup after beating Estudiantes de La Plata 2–1 in the final in Abu Dhabi, United Arab Emirates.
- Liga Deportiva Universitaria de Quito win the Recopa Sudamericana after defeating Internacional in the two-legged final.
- Liga Deportiva Universitaria de Quito win the Copa Sudamericana after defeating Fluminense FC in the two-legged final.
- FIFA World Player of the Year:
  - Men: Lionel Messi, Argentina and FC Barcelona
  - Women: Marta, Brazil and Los Angeles Sol
    - Marta becomes the first four-time winner of the award of either sex, with all of her awards consecutive.

== Athletics ==
- 2009 World Championships in Athletics at Olympiastadion, Berlin

== Australian Rules Football ==
- Australian Football League
  - July 11 – Fremantle kick the lowest score since 1961 when they score only 1.7 (13) against Adelaide’s 19.16 (130)
  - September 26 – 2009 AFL Grand Final in Melbourne, Australia, is won by the Geelong Football Club against the St Kilda Football Club on by 12 points.

== Bandy ==
- 2009 Bandy World Championship in Västerås, Sweden, is won by the host nation after defeating Russia in the final

== Baseball ==
- Japan win the 2009 World Baseball Classic after beating South Korea by 5–3 (F/10) in the final at Dodger Stadium, Los Angeles, California.
- New York City opens two new ballparks, The New Yankee Stadium for the New York Yankees and Citi Field for the New York Mets.
- Mark Buehrle of the Chicago White Sox throws the 18th perfect game in Major League history against the Tampa Bay Rays.
- The New York Yankees defeat the Philadelphia Phillies 4 games to 2 to win their 27th World Series championship. Hideki Matsui is named World Series MVP
- The Yomiuri Giants defeat the Hokkaido Nippon-Ham Fighters 4 games to 2 to win their 21st Japan Series championship. The Giants' Shinnosuke Abe is named MVP.

== Basketball ==
- NCAA men's tournament — North Carolina defeats Michigan State 89–72 at Ford Field in Detroit. It is North Carolina's fifth national title.
- NBA Finals — The Los Angeles Lakers defeat the Orlando Magic 4 games to 1 to win the 2009 NBA Championship. The Lakers' Kobe Bryant is named Finals MVP.
- Euroleague — Panathinaikos win their fifth Euroleague crown, defeating defending champions CSKA Moscow 73–71 in the final in Berlin.
- NCAA women's tournament — Connecticut completes a 39–0 season with a 76–54 win over Louisville at the Scottrade Center in St. Louis. It is the sixth national title and third unbeaten season for the Huskies.

== Boxing ==
- 2009 World Amateur Boxing Championships held in Mediolanum Forum, Milan
- David Haye defeats Nikolai Valuev to claim the WBA World heavyweight title.
- Vitali Klitchko comes back from injury
- Manny Pacquiao defeated Ricky Hatton to win the IBO and Ring Magazine Light Welterweight championship. Pacquiao also defeated Miguel Cotto to win the WBO Welterweight championship to become the first boxer to win 7 world title in seven different weight classes.
- Floyd Mayweather Jr. came out of retirement by facing lightweight champion Juan Manuel Marquez and defeating him by unanimous decision.

== Canadian football ==
- 97th Grey Cup game at McMahon Stadium in Calgary – Montreal Alouettes defeat Saskatchewan Roughriders 28–27. Avon Cobourne was named MVP

== Cricket ==
- March 3 – five members of the Sri Lanka national cricket team are injured when their team bus is attacked by masked gunmen en route to the third day's play of their Second Test against Pakistan at Lahore. The tour is cancelled following the attack.
- March 7–22 – 2009 Women's Cricket World Cup held in Australia.
- Deccan Chargers win the 2009 Indian Premier League held in South Africa.
- June 5, – June 21, – 2009 ICC World Twenty20 held in England.
- September 22, – October 5, – 2009 ICC Champions Trophy held in South Africa

== Cycling ==
- Giro d'Italia – Denis Menchov
- Tour de France – Alberto Contador
- Vuelta a España – Alejandro Valverde
- 2009 UCI Road World Championships - Men's Road Race – Cadel Evans
- 2009 UCI Road World Championships – Men's Time Trial – Fabian Cancellara
- 2009 UCI Road World Championships - Women's Road Race – Tatiana Guderzo
- 2009 UCI Road World Championships – Women's Time Trial – Kristin Armstrong

== Floorball ==
- Women's World Floorball Championships
  - Champion: Sweden
- Men's U-19 World Floorball Championships
  - Champion: Sweden
- EuroFloorball Cup
  - Men's champion: (Finland) SSV Helsinki
  - Women's champion: (Sweden) IKSU innebandy

== Golf ==
Major championships

- The Masters winner: Ángel Cabrera
- U.S. Open winner: Lucas Glover
- The Open Championship winner: Stewart Cink
- PGA Championship winner: Yang Yong-eun

Women's major championships

- Kraft Nabisco Championship winner: Brittany Lincicome
- LPGA Championship winner: Anna Nordqvist
- U.S. Women's Open winner: Ji Eun-hee
- Women's British Open winner: Catriona Matthew

Senior major championships

- Senior PGA Championship winner: Michael Allen
- Senior British Open winner: Loren Roberts
- U.S. Senior Open winner: Fred Funk
- The Tradition winner: Mike Reid
- Senior Players Championship winner: Jay Haas

== Gymnastics ==
- 2009 World Artistic Gymnastics Championships
- 2009 World Rhythmic Gymnastics Championships

== Handball ==
- 2009 World Men's Handball Championship – France defeats Croatia 24–19 in the final

== Horse racing ==
Steeplechases

- Cheltenham Gold Cup – Kauto Star
- Grand National – Mon Mome

Flat races

- Australia: Melbourne Cup – Shocking
- Canadian Triple Crown:
  1. Queen's Plate – Eye of the Leopard
  2. Prince of Wales Stakes – Gallant
  3. Breeders' Stakes – Purple Shower
- Dubai: Dubai World Cup – Well Armed
- France: Prix de l'Arc de Triomphe – Sea the Stars
- Ireland: Irish Derby Stakes – Fame and Glory
- Japan: Japan Cup – Vodka
- English Triple Crown:
  1. 2,000 Guineas Stakes – Sea the Stars
  2. The Derby – Sea the Stars
  3. St. Leger Stakes – Mastery
- United States Triple Crown:
  1. Kentucky Derby – Mine That Bird
  2. Preakness Stakes – Rachel Alexandra
  3. Belmont Stakes – Summer Bird
- Breeders' Cup World Thoroughbred Championships at Santa Anita Park, Arcadia, California (all races in order of running):
  - Day 1 (November 6):
    1. Breeders' Cup Marathon – Man of Iron
    2. Breeders' Cup Juvenile Fillies Turf – Tapitsfly
    3. Breeders' Cup Juvenile Fillies – She Be Wild
    4. Breeders' Cup Filly & Mare Turf – Midday
    5. Breeders' Cup Filly & Mare Sprint – Informed Decision
    6. Breeders' Cup Ladies' Classic – Life Is Sweet
  - Day 2 (November 7):
    1. Breeders' Cup Juvenile Turf – Pounced
    2. Breeders' Cup Turf Sprint – California Flag
    3. Breeders' Cup Sprint – Dancing in Silks
    4. Breeders' Cup Juvenile – Vale of York
    5. Breeders' Cup Mile – Goldikova
    6. Breeders' Cup Dirt Mile – Furthest Land
    7. Breeders' Cup Turf – Conduit
    8. Breeders' Cup Classic – Zenyatta

== Ice hockey ==
- April 18 – Bentley Generals win 2009 Allan Cup Canadian senior championship.
- April 19 – Ak Bars Kazan win 2009 Gagarin Cup.
- May 10 – Russia defeats Canada 2–1 to win the 2009 IIHF World Championship.
- May 24 – Windsor Spitfires win 2009 Memorial Cup Canadian junior championship.
- June 12 – Pittsburgh Penguins defeat the Detroit Red Wings to win the 2009 Stanley Cup. Evgeni Malkin is awarded the Conn Smythe Trophy.
- June 26–27 – 2009 NHL entry draft held in Montreal.
- September 29 – ZSC Lions defeat the Chicago Blackhawks to win the 2009 Victoria Cup.

== Mixed martial arts ==
The following is a list of major noteworthy MMA events by month.

January

1/14 – World Victory Road Presents: Sengoku no Ran 2009

1/17 – UFC 93: Franklin vs. Henderson

1/24 – Affliction: Day of Reckoning (Last Affliction event)

1/25 – WEC 38: Varner vs. Cerrone

1/31 – UFC 94: St-Pierre vs. Penn 2

February

2/7 – UFC Fight Night: Lauzon vs. Stephens

2/21 – UFC 95: Sanchez vs. Stevenson

March

3/1 – WEC 39: Brown vs. Garcia

3/7 – UFC 96: Jackson vs. Jardine

3/8 – DREAM.7

3/20 – World Victory Road Presents: Sengoku 7

April

4/1 – UFC Fight Night: Condit vs. Kampmann

4/3 – Bellator I (Bellator FC's first event; Start of Bellator season 1)

4/5 – WEC 40: Torres vs. Mizugaki

4/5 – DREAM.8

4/10 – Bellator II

4/11 – Strikeforce: Shamrock vs. Diaz

4/17 – Bellator III

4/17 – Bellator IV

4/18 – UFC 97: Redemption

May

5/1 – Bellator V

5/2 – World Victory Road Presents: Sengoku 8

5/8 – Bellator VI

5/15 – ShoMMA 1: Evangelista vs. Aina

5/15 – Bellator VII

5/15 – MFC 21: Hard Knocks

5/23 – UFC 98: Evans vs. Machida

5/26 – DREAM.9

5/29 – Bellator IX

June

6/5 – Bellator X

6/6 – Strikeforce: Lawler vs. Shields

6/7 – WEC 41: Brown vs. Faber II

6/12 – Bellator XI

6/13 – UFC 99: The Comeback

6/19 – ShoMMA 2: Villasenor vs. Cyborg

6/19 – Bellator XII (End of Bellator season 1)

6/20 – The Ultimate Fighter: United States vs. United Kingdom Finale

July

7/11 – UFC 100 (This event holds the highest PPV buyrate for a MMA event with 1.6 million buys)

7/20 – DREAM.10

8/2 – World Victory Road Presents: Sengoku 9

8/8 – UFC 101: Declaration

8/9 – WEC 42: Torres vs. Bowles

8/15 – Strikeforce: Carano vs. Cyborg

8/29 – UFC 102: Couture vs. Nogueira

September

9/16 – UFC Fight Night: Diaz vs. Guillard

9/19 – UFC 103: Franklin vs. Belfort

9/23 – World Victory Road Presents: Sengoku 10

9/25 – ShoMMA 3: Kennedy vs. Cummings

October

10/6 – DREAM.11

10/10 – WEC 43: Cerrone vs. Henderson

10/24 – UFC 104: Machida vs. Shogun

10/25 – DREAM.12

November

11/6 – ShoMMA 4: Gurgel vs. Evangelista

11/7 – Strikeforce: Fedor vs. Rogers

11/7 – World Victory Road Presents: Sengoku 11

11/14 – UFC 105: Couture vs. Vera

11/18 – WEC 44: Brown vs. Aldo

11/20 – ShoMMA 5: Woodley vs. Bears

11/21 – UFC 106: Ortiz vs. Griffin 2

December

12/5 – The Ultimate Fighter: Heavyweights Finale

12/12 – UFC 107: Penn vs. Sanchez

12/19 – WEC 45: Cerrone vs. Ratcliff

12/19 – Strikeforce: Evolution

12/31 – Dynamite!! 2009 (Event featured 12 DREAM/SRC MMA bouts and 6 K-1 kickboxing bouts)

== Netball ==
International tournaments

Date	Tournament	Winners	Runners up
19–28 June	2009 Asian Netball Championships	Sri Lanka	Singapore
24–29 Aug	2009 Taini Jamison Trophy Series	World 7	New Zealand
September	2009 South Pacific Mini Games	Fiji	Papua New Guinea
9–11 October	2009 World Netball Series	New Zealand	Jamaica

Major leagues

Host	League	Winners	Runners up
Australia/New Zealand	ANZ Championship	Melbourne Vixens	Adelaide Thunderbirds
United Kingdom	Netball Superleague	Team Bath	Galleria Mavericks

== Pickleball ==
- November 2–8: The first United States national pickleball championships are held in Surprise, Arizona.

== Rink hockey ==
- Spain wins the 2009 Rink Hockey World Championship, defeating Argentina in the final.

== Rowing ==
- 2009 World Rowing Championships regatta will be held at Lake Malta, Poznań, Poland

== Rugby league ==
- March 1 – Manly-Warringah Sea Eagles defeats Leeds Rhinos 28–20 to win the 2009 World Club Challenge at Elland Road
- March 22: Maesteg, South Wales – 20-year-old forward Leon Walker collapses and dies on the field in a reserve match between Wakefield Trinity Wildcats and Celtic Crusaders.
- June–July – Queensland defeats New South Wales 2–1 in the 2009 State of Origin series to claim a record 4th straight Origin series victory.
- August 29 – Warrington Wolves defeats Huddersfield Giants 25 – 16 to win The Carnegie Challenge Cup at Wembley
- October 4 – Melbourne Storm defeat Parramatta Eels 23–16 in the 2009 NRL Grand Final to win their third premiership and second in two years. Billy Slater named Clive Churchill Medalist. On April 22, 2010, the Melbourne Storm were stripped of the 2007 and 2009 premierships and the 2006–2008 minor premierships, after Storm officials confessed to the NRL that the club had committed serious and systematic breaches of the salary cap between 2006 and 2010 by running a well-organized dual contract and bookkeeping system which concealed a total of $3.17 million in payments made to players outside of the salary cap.
- November – Australia defeat England 46–16 in the final of the Rugby League Four Nations tournament in England.

== Rugby union ==
- 115th Six Nations Championship series is won by Ireland who complete the Grand Slam
- 2009 Rugby World Cup Sevens
  - Wales win the men's competition.
  - The inaugural women's competition is won by Australia.
- 2008–09 IRB Sevens World Series – South Africa
- July 18 – The Celtic League and Italian Rugby Federation tentatively agree that two Italian teams will enter the previously Celtic league in 2010–11.
- September 14 – SANZAR, the organiser of the Tri Nations and Super 14 competitions, announces that Argentina has been provisionally invited to join an expanded "Four Nations" competition effective in 2012.
- November 12 – Independent arbitrators appointed by SANZAR award the 15th Super Rugby franchise to Melbourne, specifically to the operators of the Melbourne Rebels, the city's representative in the defunct Australian Rugby Championship. The new team, whose name was ultimately announced as the Rebels, will join an expanded Super 15 in 2011.
- 2009 British & Irish Lions tour to South Africa – South Africa wins the Test series 2–1
- Tri Nations – South Africa

== Ski jumping ==
- January 6 – Wolfgang Loitzl wins the Four Hills Tournament

== Speed skating ==
- Czech female skater Martina Sáblíková and Dutch male skater Sven Kramer win the 2009 World Allround Speed Skating Championships in Hamar

== Swimming ==
- 2009 World Aquatics Championships held at Rome

== Tennis ==
- Australian Open
  - Men's final: Rafael Nadal defeats Roger Federer, 7–5, 3–6, 7–6(3), 3–6, 6–2
  - Women's final: Serena Williams defeats Dinara Safina, 6–0, 6–3
- French Open
  - Men's final: Roger Federer defeats Robin Söderling, 6–1, 7–6(1), 6–4
  - Women's final: Svetlana Kuznetsova defeats Dinara Safina, 6–4, 6–2
- Wimbledon championships
  - Men's final: Roger Federer defeats Andy Roddick, 5–7, 7–6(6), 7–6(5), 3–6, 16–14
  - Women's final: Serena Williams defeats Venus Williams, 7–6(3), 6–2
- U.S. Open
  - Men's final: Juan Martín del Potro defeats Roger Federer, 3–6, 7–6(5), 4–6, 7–6(4), 6–2
  - Women's final: Kim Clijsters defeats Caroline Wozniacki, 7–5, 6–3
- Davis Cup
  - Spain defeats Czech Republic, 5–0
- Fed Cup
  - Italy defeats United States, 4–0

== Water polo ==
- Men's water polo World Championship 2009 : Serbia

== Multi-sport events ==
- August 3 – 9 – 2009 World Waterski Championships in Calgary, Alberta, Canada.
- July 11 – 19 – 2009 Lusophony Games in Lisbon, Portugal.
- July 16 – 26 – World Games 2009 in Kaohsiung, Taiwan.
  - Chinese delegation boycotts the opening ceremony on July 16.
- 2009 Summer Deaflympics is held in Taipei, Taiwan
- December 5(some events started from December 2)—December 13 – 2009 East Asian Games in Hong Kong, China
- December 9 – December 18 – 2009 Southeast Asian Games in Vientiane, Laos
