= 2009 Prix de l'Arc de Triomphe =

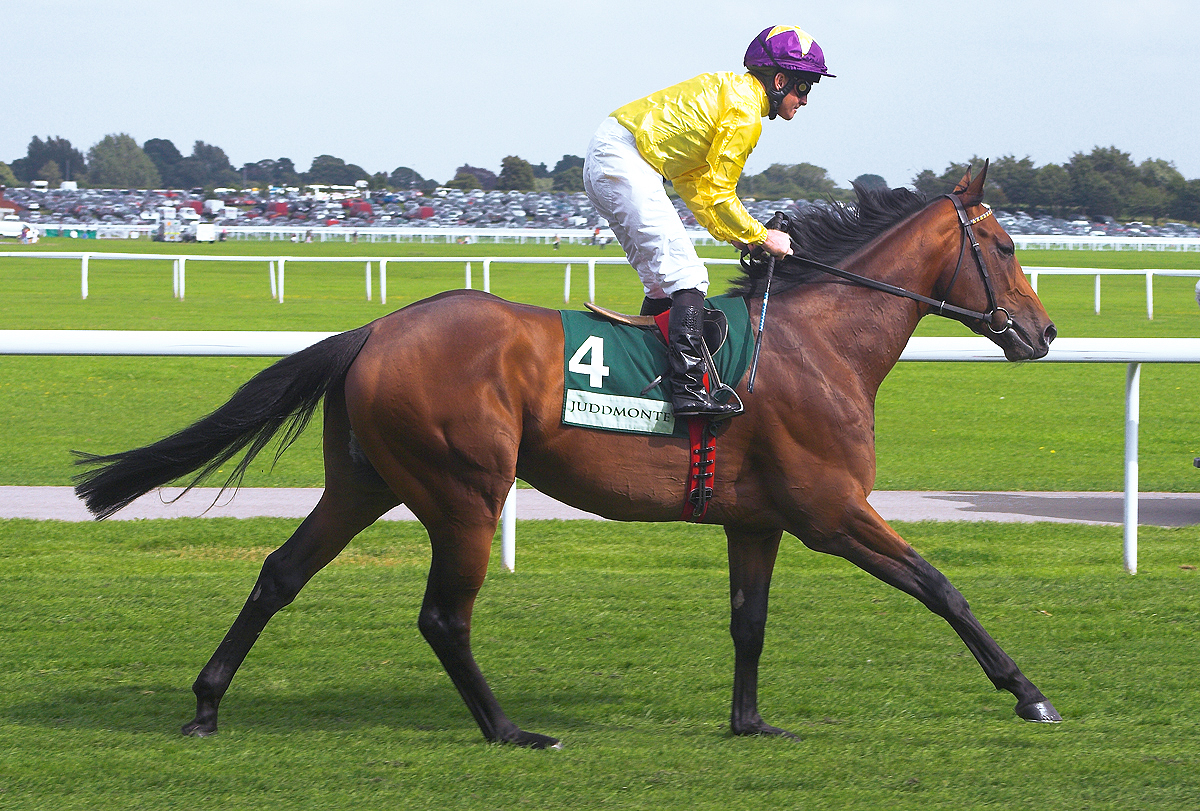
- Location: Longchamp Racecourse
- Date: October 200
- Winning horse: Sea the Stars

The 2009 Prix de l'Arc de Triomphe was a horse race held at Longchamp on Sunday 4 October 2009. It was the 88th running of the Prix de l'Arc de Triomphe.

The winner was Sea the Stars, a three-year-old colt trained in Ireland by John Oxx. The winning jockey was Michael Kinane.

Sea the Stars became the first horse to win the 2,000 Guineas, the Epsom Derby and the Prix de l'Arc de Triomphe. It was his sixth consecutive Group 1 victory.

Set Sail and... Grand Ducal, there about five in front now of Stacelita, he's getting up on the inside of Sea the Stars, he's got six or seven lengths to make up, he'll have to be a champion. Stacelita races into the lead now, 2 in front, he is a champion I reckon, he's got the run though in the center, he's out after the leader, he picks up Stacelita, he powers clear! Sea the Stars racing away perfection in equine form, a horse of a lifetime he's just going to go on and win the arc by two lengths!

— Commentator Jim McGrath describes the climax of the race

== Race details ==
- Sponsor: Qatar Racing and Equestrian Club
- Purse: €4,000,000; First prize: €2,285,600
- Going: Good
- Distance: 2,400 metres
- Number of runners: 19
- Winner's time: 2m 26.3s

== Full result ==
Pos.	Marg.	Horse	Age	Jockey	Trainer (Country)
1		Sea the Stars	3	Michael Kinane	John Oxx (IRE)
2	2	Youmzain	6	Kieren Fallon	Mick Channon (GB)
3	hd	Cavalryman	3	Frankie Dettori	André Fabre (FR)
4	hd	Conduit	4	Ryan Moore	Sir Michael Stoute (GB)
5	1	Dar Re Mi	4	Jimmy Fortune	John Gosden (GB)
6	1	Fame and Glory	3	Johnny Murtagh	Aidan O'Brien (IRE)
7	½	La Boum	6	Thierry Jarnet	Robert Collet (FR)
7	dh	Stacelita	3	Christophe Soumillon	Jean-Claude Rouget (FR)
9	¾	Magadan	4	Anthony Crastus	Élie Lellouche (FR)
10	½	Vision d'Etat	4	Olivier Peslier	Eric Libaud (FR)
11	¾	Tangaspeed	4	Ioritz Mendizabal	Robert Laplanche (FR)
12	shd	Beheshtam	3	Gérald Mossé	Alain de Royer-Dupré (FR)
13	3	Getaway	6	Stéphane Pasquier	Jens Hirschberger (GER)
14	snk	The Bogberry	4	Magomet Kappushev	Alain de Royer-Dupré (FR)
15	8	Hot Six	4	T. J. Pereira	Givanildo Duarte (BRZ)
16	2	Tullamore	4	Vaclav Janacek	Zdeno Koplik (CZE)
17	4	Grand Ducal	3	Pat Smullen	Aidan O'Brien (IRE)
18	2	Set Sail	3	Sean Levey	Aidan O'Brien (IRE)
19	15	Steele Tango	4	Darryll Holland	Roger Teal (GB)

- Abbreviations: dh = dead-heat; shd = short-head; hd = head; snk = short-neck

== Winner's details ==
Further details of the winner, Sea the Stars.

- Sex: Colt
- Foaled: 6 April 2006
- Country: Ireland
- Sire: Cape Cross; Dam: Urban Sea (Miswaki)
- Owner: Christopher Tsui
- Breeder: Sunderland Holdings Ltd
