= Star Catcher (horse) =

Racehorse trained in Britain

- Sire: Sea the Stars
- Grandsire: Cape Cross
- Dam: Lynnwood Chase
- Damsire: Horse Chestnut
- Sex: Filly
- Foaled: 19 February 2016
- Country: United Kingdom
- Color: Bay
- Breeder: Hascombe and Valiant Studs
- Owner: Anthony Oppenheimer
- Trainer: John Gosden
- Record: 7: 5-0-1
- Earnings: £961,165

Major wins
- Ribblesdale Stakes (2019); Irish Oaks (2019); Prix Vermeille (2019); British Champions Fillies & Mares Stakes (2019)

Awards
- Cartier Champion Three-year-old Filly (2019)

Star Catcher (foaled 19 February 2016) is a British Thoroughbred racehorse. She ran sixth in her only run as a two-year-old in 2018 and showed promise in the following spring when she won on her seasonal debut and then finished third in the Fillies' Trial Stakes. Star Catcher then established herself as a top-class performer with wins in the Ribblesdale Stakes, Irish Oaks, Prix Vermeille and British Champions Fillies & Mares Stakes.

== Background ==
Star Catcher is a bay filly with no white markings bred in England by her owner Anthony Oppenheimer's Hascombe and Valiant Stud. Oppenheimer is a member of the family that controlled the De Beers Mining Company. The filly was sent into training with John Gosden at Clarehaven Stables in Newmarket, Suffolk.

She is from the sixth crop of foals sired by Sea the Stars who won the 2000 Guineas, Epsom Derby and Prix de l'Arc de Triomphe in 2009. His other major winners have included Harzand, Taghrooda, Stradivarius, Sea of Class and Sea The Moon. Star Catcher's dam Lynnwood Chase showed no racing ability, failing to win or place in two six starts but was a very successful broodmare who also produced Cannock Chase (Canadian International Stakes) and Pisco Sour (Prix Eugène Adam). She is one of several notable horses descended from the Lowther Stakes winner Bitty Girl.

== Racing career ==
=== 2018: two-year-old season ===
Star Catcher made her first and only appearance as a juvenile in a maiden race over one mile on the synthetic Polytrack surface at Chelmsford City Racecourse on 20 December. Ridden by Robert Havlin she was made the 4/5 favourite but never recovered from a slow start and came home sixth of the twelve runners, six and a quarter lengths behind the winner Mister Chiang.

=== 2019: three-year-old season ===
==== Spring ====
Star Catcher was ridden in all of her races as a three-year-old by Frankie Dettori. On her seasonal debut, she started 10/11 favourite for a maiden over ten furlongs on soft ground at Newbury Racecourse on 12 April and recorded her first success as she drew away from her ten opponents in the closing stages to win by four and a half lengths. After the race Dettori told Gosden "don't go for the Oaks, go to the Ribblesdale, she's not got the strength for the Oaks yet".

On 18 May, over the same course and distance, the filly was stepped up in class for Listed Fillies' Trial Stakes in which she led until being overtaken in the final furlong and finished a close third behind Queen Power and Lavender's Blue. Dettori blamed himself for the defeat, saying that he had set too slow a pace.

==== Summer ====
Despite her defeat at Newbury, Star Catcher was moved up in grade again for the Group 2 Ribblesdale Stakes over one and a half miles at Royal Ascot on 20 June and started the 4/1 second choice behind the Aidan O'Brien-trained Fleeting who had won the May Hill Stakes and finished third in the Epsom Oaks. The other nine runners included Queen Power and Frankellina (second in the Musidora Stakes) as well as Star Catcher's well-fancied stablemates Fanny Logan and Sparkle Roll. Star Catcher raced in mid-division before taking the lead early in the straight and pulled away in the final strides to win by one and a half lengths from Fleeting.

On 20 July the filly was sent to Ireland for the Irish Oaks over one and a half miles at the Curragh. As she had not been among the original entries for the race, her owner was required to pay a supplementary fee of €40,000 to secure her place in the contest. She started the 7/2 second favourite behind Pink Dogwood (runner-up in the Epsom Oaks) in an eight-runner field which also included Fleeting and Iridessa. Star Catcher led from the start, accelerated clear of her opponents in the straight, and held off a late challenge from Fleeting to win by half a length. John Gosden commented "It was the obvious race to run her in after her Ribblesdale win, and we got the result we wanted. But I've said it before and I'll say it again: The Irish classics close too soon... When Frankie won on her at Royal Ascot, he said the last furlong was her best, so he was determined it wouldn't be a falsely run race. You leave things to Frankie, and his tactics today were perfect. We're very lucky to have him. We knew Star Catcher had really done well since the Ribblesdale. She's very progressive and can only get better".

==== Autumn ====
After a late summer break, Star Catcher returned on 15 September at Longchamp Racecourse when she was matched against older fillies and mares in the Group 1 Prix Vermeille over 2400 metres. She started the 11/10 favourite ahead of her stablemate Anapurna in a field which also included Fleeting, Pink Dogwood, Channel and Villa Marina. Star Catcher took the lead at the start and made all the running, staying on well in the straight to win by three quarters of a length from Musis Amica. After the race Dettori said "She's a very good filly. She stays well, she doesn't mind being in front and the ground was slick today and she likes it. I couldn't fault her. She didn't put a foot wrong... once she got to the front she was full of enthusiasm. She travelled strong. We went a decent gallop and she kept it up".

In the British Champions Fillies & Mares Stakes run on soft ground at Ascot on 19 October Star Catcher was made 7/4 favourite against eleven opponents including Fleeting, Anapurna, Pink Dogwood, Sparkle Roll, Tarnawa, and Antonia de Vega (Prestige Stakes). Star Catcher raced in fourth place behind the front-running Delphinia before producing a sustained run in the straight. She overtook Delphinia inside the final furlong and won by a short head. John Gosden commented "she was determined to get her head in front. You can have nothing but admiration for courage like that. She is a brave, wonderful filly and will now have a lovely winter off".

== Pedigree ==
Pedigree of Star Catcher (GB), bay filly, 2016
Sire Sea the Stars (IRE) 2006	Cape Cross (IRE); 1994	Green Desert (USA)	Danzig
Sire Sea the Stars (IRE) 2006	Cape Cross (IRE); 1994	Green Desert (USA)	Foreign Courier
Sire Sea the Stars (IRE) 2006	Cape Cross (IRE); 1994	Park Appeal	Ahonoora (GB)
Sire Sea the Stars (IRE) 2006	Cape Cross (IRE); 1994	Park Appeal	Balidaress
Sire Sea the Stars (IRE) 2006	Urban Sea (USA); 1989	Miswaki	Mr. Prospector
Sire Sea the Stars (IRE) 2006	Urban Sea (USA); 1989	Miswaki	Hopespringseternal
Sire Sea the Stars (IRE) 2006	Urban Sea (USA); 1989	Allegretta (GB)	Lombard (GER)
Sire Sea the Stars (IRE) 2006	Urban Sea (USA); 1989	Allegretta (GB)	Anatevka (GER)
Dam Lynnwood Chase (USA) 2002	Horse Chestnut (SAF); 1995	Fort Wood (USA)	Sadler's Wells
Dam Lynnwood Chase (USA) 2002	Horse Chestnut (SAF); 1995	Fort Wood (USA)	Fall Aspen
Dam Lynnwood Chase (USA) 2002	Horse Chestnut (SAF); 1995	London Wall	Col Pickering
Dam Lynnwood Chase (USA) 2002	Horse Chestnut (SAF); 1995	London Wall	Nalatale
Dam Lynnwood Chase (USA) 2002	Lady Ilsley (USA); 1996	Trempolino	Sharpen Up (GB)
Dam Lynnwood Chase (USA) 2002	Lady Ilsley (USA); 1996	Trempolino	Trephine (FR)
Dam Lynnwood Chase (USA) 2002	Lady Ilsley (USA); 1996	Sue Warner	Forli (ARG)
Dam Lynnwood Chase (USA) 2002	Lady Ilsley (USA); 1996	Sue Warner	Bitty Girl (GB) (Family 1-n)
