= Sea Of Class =

Irish-bred Thoroughbred racehorse

- Racing silks of Sunderland Holding Inc
- Sire: Sea the Stars
- Grandsire: Cape Cross
- Dam: Holy Moon
- Damsire: Hernando
- Sex: Filly
- Foaled: 23 May 2015
- Died: 22 July 2019 (aged 4)
- Country: Ireland
- Colour: Chestnut
- Breeder: Razza del Velino SRL
- Owner: Sunderland Holding Inc
- Trainer: William Haggas
- Record: 7: 4-2-0
- Earnings: £1,501,911

Major wins
- Fillies' Trial Stakes (2018); Abingdon Stakes (2018); Irish Oaks (2018); Yorkshire Oaks (2018)

Sea Of Class (23 May 2015 – 22 July 2019) was an Irish-bred British-trained Thoroughbred racehorse. She was unraced as a juvenile and beaten on her three-year-old debut, but then made rapid progress, winning the Fillies' Trial Stakes in May and the Abingdon Stakes in June. When stepped up to Group 1 class she defeated top-class fields to take the Irish Oaks in July and the Yorkshire Oaks in August before being narrowly beaten in the Prix de l'Arc de Triomphe. She died on 22 July 2019 after undergoing surgery to remove a tumour from her gut.

== Background ==
Sea Of Class was a light-coloured chestnut filly with no white markings bred in Ireland by the Italian-based breeding company Razza del Velino SRL. She was a very late foal, being born on 23 May. As a yearling she was offered for sale at Tattersalls and bought for 170,000 guineas by McKeever Bloodstock. She passed into the ownership Sunderland Holding Inc and was sent into training with William Haggas at the Somerville Lodge stable in Newmarket, Suffolk. She was ridden in all of her races by James Doyle.

She was from the fifth crop of foals sired by Sea the Stars who won the 2000 Guineas, Epsom Derby and Prix de l'Arc de Triomphe in 2009. His other major winners have included Harzand, Taghrooda, Stradivarius and Sea The Moon. Sea Of Class's dam Holy Moon won two races in Italy and became a very successful broodmare whose other foals have included Charity Line (Oaks d'Italia, Premio Lydia Tesio), Final Score (Oaks d'Italia, Premio Lydia Tesio) and Cherry Collect (Premio Regina Elena, Oaks d'Italia). Her dam Centinela was a half-sister to yet another Oaks d'Italia winner in Bright Generation and was a distant relative of Scratch.

== Racing career ==
=== Spring ===
On her racecourse debut, Sea Of Class contested a maiden race over one mile at Newmarket Racecourse on 18 April in which she started the 5/4 favourite in a field of nine fillies. She took the lead approaching the final furlong but was caught in the last strides and beaten a neck by the 14/1 outsider Ceilidhs Dream. Despite her defeat she was then stepped up in class for the Listed Fillies' Trial Stakes over ten furlongs at Newbury Racecourse on 19 May. Starting the 9/4 second choice in the betting, she took the lead a furlong out and won "readily" by two lengths from the Aidan O'Brien-trained Athena, with five lengths back to the favoured Crystal Hope in third.

=== Summer ===
In the Listed Abingdon Stakes, since 2018 run as the Johnnie Lewis Memorial Stakes to commemorate Major Johnnie Lewis, a bloodstock agent who died in June 2017, Sea Of Class started the 30/100 favourite against six opponents. After being restrained by Doyle in the early stages she went to the front approaching the final furlong and won "comfortably" by two lengths from Mrs Sippy.

On 21 July Sea Of Class was the only British-trained filly to be sent to Ireland to contest the 2018 running of the Irish Oaks over one and half miles at Curragh and was made the 11/4 second choice in the betting. Her six opponents included the Epsom Oaks winner Forever Together, Magic Wand (winner of the Ribblesdale Stakes, and 10/11 favourite) and Bye Bye Baby (Blue Wind Stakes) (all trained by O'Brien) as well as Mary Tudor (Salsabil Stakes) and the maiden race winners Romiyna and Tissiak. Sea Of Class was held up at the rear of the field before being switched to the outside to make her challenge in the straight. She moved into second place behind Forever Together entering the final furlong and caught the Epsom Oaks winner in the last strides to win by a neck under a "hands and heels" ride. Commenting on the extreme waiting tactics employed by Doyle Haggas commented "I did ask him to be brave, but I didn't think he’d be that brave" whilst Doyle said "I had full confidence in her. Let's hope there's improvement again. It's only her fourth race and a lot of these that ran today had plenty of experience".

The Yorkshire Oaks on 23 August saw Sea Of Class matched against older fillies and mares for the first time. She started the 7/4 favourite ahead of Laurens whilst the other six runners were Coronet (Ribblesdale Stakes), Magic Wand, Bye Bye Baby, Eziyra (Ballyroan Stakes), Horseplay (Lancashire Oaks) and Flattering. She raced at the rear of the field before making a forward move on the outside in the straight and accelerating into the lead a furlong out. She quickly drew clear of her rivals and won in "impressive" style by two and a quarter lengths from Coronet. Haggas, who was celebrating said 58th birthday said "She was devastating. You always hope they are going to do something like that, but she really was impressive". After the race bookmakers elevated the filly to joint-favourite for the Prix de l'Arc de Triomphe even though she had not been entered for the race and that her participation was dependent on her owner paying a supplementary entry fee.

=== Autumn ===
On 3 October Sea of Class was entered in the Prix de l'Arc de Triomphe after her owners paid a supplementary fee of €120,000. Four days later the filly started the 5.4/1 joint second choice in the betting for the race over 2400 metres at Longchamp Racecourse despite being drawn on the wide outside. When asked for advice on how to deal with the unfavourable draw the trainer's father-in-law Lester Piggott said "Don't change the tactics, drop her out the back and pray". Doyle dropped the filly in at the rear of the field and turned into the straight last of the nineteen runners. Sea of Class then began to make rapid progress, cutting through the field and overtaking horse after horse but failing by a short neck to overhaul the favourite Enable. The filly's owner Christopher Tsui commented "I was proud of my filly, I thought she ran a fantastic race. It's the most disappointed I’ve been to win €1 million". On the following day Haggas said "Sea of Class arrived back from France this morning in good shape... She won't be running again this year and the intention is to keep her for next year. She ran a great race yesterday and hopefully she can go one better next year".

In the 2018 World's Best Racehorse Rankings Sea Of Class was given a rating of 122, making her the 20th best racehorse in the world and the third best three-year-old filly behind Almond Eye and Alpha Centauri.

=== 2019: four-year-old season ===
On her four-year-old debut, Sea Of Class started the 5/1 fourth choice in the betting for the Prince of Wales's Stakes over ten furlongs at Royal Ascot on 19 June. The race was run in very difficult conditions, with the course being swept by heavy rain and the filly never looked likely to win, coming home fifth of the eight runners behind Crystal Ocean.

== Death ==
On 3 July 2019, Sea Of Class underwent colic surgery to remove a mass, which turned out to be a malignant lymphoma, and part of her gut. After initially making good progress, her condition deteriorated on 22 July 2019 and, after a scan revealed another lymphoma, she was euthanised.

== Pedigree ==
Pedigree of Sea of Class (IRE), chestnut filly, 2015
| Sire Sea the Stars (IRE) 2006 | Cape Cross (IRE); 1994 | Green Desert (USA) | Danzig |
| Sire Sea the Stars (IRE) 2006 | Cape Cross (IRE); 1994 | Green Desert (USA) | Foreign Courier |
| Sire Sea the Stars (IRE) 2006 | Cape Cross (IRE); 1994 | Park Appeal | Ahonoora (GB) |
| Sire Sea the Stars (IRE) 2006 | Cape Cross (IRE); 1994 | Park Appeal | Balidaress |
| Sire Sea the Stars (IRE) 2006 | Urban Sea (USA); 1989 | Miswaki | Mr. Prospector |
| Sire Sea the Stars (IRE) 2006 | Urban Sea (USA); 1989 | Miswaki | Hopespringseternal |
| Sire Sea the Stars (IRE) 2006 | Urban Sea (USA); 1989 | Allegretta (GB) | Lombard (GER) |
| Sire Sea the Stars (IRE) 2006 | Urban Sea (USA); 1989 | Allegretta (GB) | Anatevka (GER) |
| Dam Holy Moon (IRE) 2000 | Hernando (FR); 1990 | Niniski (USA) | Nijinsky (CAN) |
| Dam Holy Moon (IRE) 2000 | Hernando (FR); 1990 | Niniski (USA) | Virginia Hills |
| Dam Holy Moon (IRE) 2000 | Hernando (FR); 1990 | Whakilyric (USA) | Miswaki |
| Dam Holy Moon (IRE) 2000 | Hernando (FR); 1990 | Whakilyric (USA) | Lyrism |
| Dam Holy Moon (IRE) 2000 | Centinela (GB); 1992 | Caerleon (USA) | Nijinsky (CAN) |
| Dam Holy Moon (IRE) 2000 | Centinela (GB); 1992 | Caerleon (USA) | Foreseer |
| Dam Holy Moon (IRE) 2000 | Centinela (GB); 1992 | New Generation (IRE) | Young Generation |
| Dam Holy Moon (IRE) 2000 | Centinela (GB); 1992 | New Generation (IRE) | Madina (FR) (Family 14-f) |

- Sea Of Class is inbred 3 × 4 to Miswaki, meaning that this stallion appears in both the third and fourth generations of her pedigree. She is also inbred 4 × 4 to Nijinsky.
