= Crowded House (horse) =

British-bred Thoroughbred racehorse

- Sire: Rainbow Quest
- Grandsire: Blushing Groom
- Dam: Wiener Wald
- Damsire: Woodman
- Sex: Stallion
- Foaled: 22 March 2006
- Country: United Kingdom
- Colour: Chestnut
- Breeder: Car Colston Hall Stud
- Owner: J Paul Reddam, Carmen Burrell & Jonathan Harvey
- Trainer: Brian Meehan; Ben Cecil
- Record: 19: 2-4-0
- Earnings: £590,702

Major wins
- Racing Post Trophy (2008)

Awards
- Top-rated British two-year-old (2008)

Crowded House (foaled 22 March 2006) is a British-bred Thoroughbred racehorse and sire. As a two-year-old in 2008 he won two of his four races including an impressive victory in the Group One Racing Post Trophy and was rated the season's best British-trained juvenile. He started the following year as a leading contender for the British Classic Races but ran poorly in the Dante Stakes before finishing sixth in The Derby. He subsequently raced in Dubai and the United States but never won another race although he finished second in the Al Maktoum Challenge, Round 2 and the Pacific Classic. He was retired from racing in 2011 having won two of his nineteen races and became a breeding stallion in Australia.

== Background ==
Crowded House is a chestnut horse with a broad white blaze and four white socks bred by the Nottinghamshire-based Car Colston Hall Stud. He was sired by Rainbow Quest who won the Prix de l'Arc de Triomphe before becoming a very successful breeding stallion. Rainbow Quest's other progeny included Quest for Fame, Saumarez, Raintrap, Nedawi, Armiger, Spectrum and Millenary. Crowded House's dam Wiener Wald made no impact as a racehorse, failing to win or place in five races in the United States, but was a daughter of Chapel of Dreams who won the Palomar Handicap and was a half-sister to Storm Cat.

As a yearling, Crowded House was offered for sale at Tattersalls in October 2007 and was bought for 75,000 guineas by the bloodstock agents McKeever St Lawrence. The colt was sent into training with Brian Meehan at Manton in Wiltshire. During his racing career Crowded House was owned in partnership by J Paul Reddam, Carmen Burrell and Jonathan Harvey.

== Racing career ==
=== 2008: two-year-old season ===
On his racecourse debut Crowded House started a 25/1 outsider in a maiden race over seven furlongs at Newmarket Racecourse on 22 August and finished tenth of the nineteen runners behind his stable companion Delegator. On 5 September the colt was stepped up in distance for a maiden over one mile on the polytrack surface at Kempton Park Racecourse and started the 11/4 joint-favourite alongside the John Gosden-trained Alwaary in a thirteen-runner field. Ridden by Jamie Spencer he disputed the lead from the start, went clear of the field approaching the final furlong and won by three and a quarter lengths despite being eased down in the closing stages. Crowded House's next race was the Tattersalls Timeform Million at Newmarket on 4 October, a race restricted to horses sold as yearlings at Tatteralls and which carried a first prize of £541,700. After racing among the leaders he took the lead 50 yards from the finish he was caught in the final strides and beaten by the gelding Donativum. The winner went on to take the Breeders' Cup Juvenile Turf three weeks later.

On 25 October Crowded House was moved up in class for the Group One Racing Post Trophy over one mile at Doncaster Racecourse and was made the 7/1 third favourite behind Jukebox Jury (winner of the Royal Lodge Stakes) and the Irish challenger Masterofthehorse who had finished third to Sea the Stars in the Beresford Stakes. The other twelve runners included Sri Putra (Solario Stakes), Indian Ocean (fourth in the National Stakes) and several highly regarded maiden winners. Jamie Spencer restrained the colt at the rear of the field as the outsider Cornish set the pace, before switching to the right to make his challenge in the last quarter mile. The colt veered to the left, hampering at least two of his opponents before sprinting clear in the closing stages to win by three and a half lengths from Jukebox Jury with Skanky Biscuit (also trained by Meehan) a neck away in third. After the race Spencer commented "He's just a good horse and needs better ground really. I was just stopped in my run early and when I got out he just flew. It was just inexperience that made him go left. He's a class horse." Meehan said "He looks good, he looks a serious horse, he did it so well. He was probably always getting there. In the Sales race at Newmarket, we had to go for the money but it was obviously a furlong too short. He looked very impressive here today and he's a very classy horse, everything about him is good".

=== 2009: three-year-old season ===
Crowded House began the 2008 season as the ante-post favourite for The Derby. On his first appearance as a three-year-old, Crowded House contested the Dante Stakes (a major trial race for the Derby) over ten and a half furlongs at York Racecourse on 14 May. He started the 2/1 favourite but never looked likely to win and finished eighth of the ten runners behind Black Bear Island. Meehan said that the colt had returned from York in a somewhat "battered" condition and commented "I still think the world of the horse. We've still got big plans for him".

In the 2009 Epsom Derby on 6 June Crowded House started at odds of 20/1 in a twelve-runner field which contained only four British-trained runners. Meehan decided to allow the colt to take his chance after an impressive exercise gallop six days before the race. After turning into the straight in eleventh place he made steady progress before being badly hampered two furlongs from the finish and came home sixth behind the Irish colts Sea the Stars, Fame and Glory, Masterofthehorse, Rip Van Winkle and Golden Sword.

=== 2010: four-year-old season ===
In the early part of 2010 Crowded House was sent to race in Dubai where he contested three races on the synthetic Tapeta Footings track at Meydan Racecourse. In February he finished second to Alexandros in the Al Rashidiya and then started favourite for the Al Maktoum Challenge, Round 2 in which he was beaten half a length by the locally trained Allybar. On 27 March he was ridden by John Velasquez in the Dubai World Cup and finished ninth of fourteen behind the Brazilian-bred Gloria de Campeao.

On his return to Europe, Crowded House finished fourth in the Gordon Richards Stakes at Sandown Park Racecourse in April, sixth to Harbinger in the Hardwicke Stakes at Royal Ascot in June and seventh in the Princess of Wales's Stakes at Newmarket in July.

In the autumn of 2010 Crowded House was sent to race in the United States where he was trained by Ben Cecil. On his first appearance in North America he finished fourth behind The Usual Q T in the Grade I Eddie Read Handicap on turf at Del Mar Racetrack on 25 July. On 29 August he was ridden by Corey Nakatani in the Grade I Pacific Classic on Del Mar's polytrack surface. Starting at odds of 12.6/1 he took the lead a furlong out but was caught in the last 40 yards and beaten three quarter of a length into second place by the five-year-old Richard's Kid. In his two remaining races of 2010 Crowded House finished a close fourth to Court Vision in the Woodbine Mile in September but then ran poorly when last of seven behind Richard's Kid in the Goodwood Stakes at Hollywood Park Racetrack on 3 October.

=== 2011: five-year-old season ===
In 2011 Crowded House was again sent to race in Dubai and ran three times at Meydan. He finished seventh in the Al Maktoum Challenge, Round 2 and ninth in the Burj Nahaar before running last of fourteen in the Godolphin Mile on 26 March.

== Assessment ==
In the 2008 European Thoroughbred Rankings, Crowded House was given a rating of 120, making him the third-best juvenile of the year behind the Irish colts Mastercraftsman and Bushranger.

== Stud record ==
At the end of his racing career, Crowded House was retired to become a breeding stallion at the Wattle Grove Stud, in the Southern Highlands region of New South Wales, Australia.

== Pedigree ==
Pedigree of Crowded House (GB), chestnut stallion, 2006
Sire Rainbow Quest (USA) 1981	Blushing Groom (FR); 1974	Red God	Nasrullah
Sire Rainbow Quest (USA) 1981	Blushing Groom (FR); 1974	Red God	Spring Run
Sire Rainbow Quest (USA) 1981	Blushing Groom (FR); 1974	Runaway Bride	Wild Risk
Sire Rainbow Quest (USA) 1981	Blushing Groom (FR); 1974	Runaway Bride	Aimee
Sire Rainbow Quest (USA) 1981	I Will Follow (USA); 1975	Herbager	Vandale
Sire Rainbow Quest (USA) 1981	I Will Follow (USA); 1975	Herbager	Flagette
Sire Rainbow Quest (USA) 1981	I Will Follow (USA); 1975	Where You Lead	Raise a Native
Sire Rainbow Quest (USA) 1981	I Will Follow (USA); 1975	Where You Lead	Noblesse
Dam Wiener Wald (USA) 1992	Woodman (USA); 1983	Mr. Prospector	Raise a Native
Dam Wiener Wald (USA) 1992	Woodman (USA); 1983	Mr. Prospector	Gold Digger
Dam Wiener Wald (USA) 1992	Woodman (USA); 1983	Playmate	Buckpasser
Dam Wiener Wald (USA) 1992	Woodman (USA); 1983	Playmate	Intriguing
Dam Wiener Wald (USA) 1992	Chapel of Dreams (USA); 1984	Northern Dancer	Nearctic
Dam Wiener Wald (USA) 1992	Chapel of Dreams (USA); 1984	Northern Dancer	Natalma
Dam Wiener Wald (USA) 1992	Chapel of Dreams (USA); 1984	Terlingua	Secretariat
Dam Wiener Wald (USA) 1992	Chapel of Dreams (USA); 1984	Terlingua	Crimson Saint (Family: 8-c)

- Crowded House was inbred 4 × 4 to Raise a Native, meaning that this stallion appears twice in the fourth generation of his pedigree.
