= Crowded House (disambiguation) =

Crowded House are an Australasian rock band.

Crowded House may also refer to:

- Crowded House (album), the band's eponymous debut album, 1986
- Crowded House (horse) (foaled 2006), a British Thoroughbred racehorse
- "Crowded House" (Doctors), a 2005 television episode
