= 2009 in tennis =

This page covers all the important events in the sport of tennis in 2009. Primarily, it provides the results of notable tournaments throughout the year on both the ATP and WTA Tours, the Davis Cup, and the Fed Cup.

== Changes ==
The structure of both the WTA and ATP tours has been changed for 2009. On the men's side, Masters Series events have been replaced by Masters 1000 tournaments, while the International Series Gold and International Series tournaments are now 500 Series and 250 Series events respectively. The season-ending ATP World Tour Finals remains unchanged.

On the women's tour, the tiered system which has existed since 1988 has been scrapped in favour of a structure closer to the men's circuit. Tier I and Tier II have been merged into the WTA Premier Tournaments. The Tier III and Tier IV have also been merged into International Tournaments. The WTA Tour Championships remain on the schedule but the WTA have also initiated a second season-ending tournament, the Commonwealth Bank Tour of Champions for eight players who did not qualify for the Tour Championships (usually below the top eight in the rankings).

== News ==
=== January ===
See: 2009 ATP World Tour, 2009 WTA Tour

- 1 January: The season begins a few days earlier than usual with the newly formed Capitala World Tennis Championship in Abu Dhabi. The draw features Roger Federer, Rafael Nadal, James Blake, Nikolay Davydenko, Andy Murray and Andy Roddick.
- 4 January: The first official event of the season, the new Brisbane International joint event commences in Australia.
- 5 January: Two male events begin in Chennai and Doha, while a women's tournament in Auckland also starts.

=== February ===
1 February: Rafael Nadal defeats Roger Federer in five sets to win the Australian Open.

=== March ===
Rafael Nadal and Andy Murray win the BNP Paribas Open and the Sony Ericsson Open respectively

=== April ===
Rafael Nadal wins the Monte-Carlo Rolex Masters, Barcelona Open Banco Sabadell, and the Internazionali BNL d'Italia

=== May ===
17 May: Roger Federer overturns a 5 match losing streak to Rafael Nadal by defeating him in straight sets to win the Mutua Madrileña Madrid Open which ended his title drought

=== June ===
7 June: Roger Federer ties Pete Sampras's all-time record with the most grand slam singles titles (14) by defeating Robin Söderling in the final to win his first Roland Garros title

=== July ===
5 July: Roger Federer defeats Andy Roddick 5–7, 7-6(8), 7-6(5), 3–6, 16–14 to win his 6th Wimbledon title and record 15th Grand Slam singles title

=== August ===
- 13 August: The top 8 seeds ( Roger Federer, Rafael Nadal, Andy Murray, Novak Djokovic, Andy Roddick, Juan Martín del Potro, Jo-Wilfried Tsonga, Nikolay Davydenko) advance to the quarterfinals of the Rogers Cup, making it the first time in tennis history that the top 8 players in the ATP ranking system made it to the quarterfinals of the same tournament. Jo-Wilfried Tsonga turned around a 1–5 deficit in the third set of the quarterfinals against Roger Federer to win the match before losing to eventual champion Andy Murray
- 23 August: Roger Federer wins his sixth ATP World Tour 1000 title defeating Novak Djokovic at the Cincinnati Masters.

=== September ===
- 14 September: Juan Martín del Potro turns around a 1 set to 2 deficit to upset top ranked defending champion Roger Federer to win the US Open

=== November ===
- 29 November: Nikolay Davydenko defeats all three 2009 Grand Slam Champions en route to winning the Barclays ATP World Tour Finals.

== ITF ==
=== Grand Slam events ===
- Australian Open (19 January – 1 February)
  - Men's singles: Rafael Nadal def. Roger Federer
  - Women's singles: Serena Williams def. Dinara Safina
  - Men's doubles: Bob Bryan / Mike Bryan def. Mahesh Bhupathi / Mark Knowles
  - Women's doubles: Serena Williams / Venus Williams def. Daniela Hantuchová / Ai Sugiyama
  - Mixed doubles: Sania Mirza / Mahesh Bhupathi def. Nathalie Dechy / Andy Ram
- French Open (24 May – 7 June)
  - Men's singles: Roger Federer def. Robin Söderling
  - Women's singles: Svetlana Kuznetsova def. Dinara Safina
  - Men's doubles: Lukáš Dlouhý / Leander Paes def. Wesley Moodie / Dick Norman
  - Women's doubles: Anabel Medina Garrigues / Virginia Ruano Pascual def. Victoria Azarenka / Elena Vesnina
  - Mixed doubles: Liezel Huber / Bob Bryan def. Vania King / Marcelo Melo
- Wimbledon Championships (22 June – 5 July)
  - Men's singles: Roger Federer def. Andy Roddick
  - Women's singles: Serena Williams def. Venus Williams
  - Men's doubles: Daniel Nestor / Nenad Zimonjić def. Bob Bryan / Mike Bryan
  - Women's doubles: Serena Williams / Venus Williams def. Samantha Stosur / Rennae Stubbs
  - Mixed doubles: Anna-Lena Grönefeld / Mark Knowles def. Cara Black / Leander Paes
- US Open (31 August – 13 September)
  - Men's singles: Juan Martín del Potro def. Roger Federer
  - Women's singles: Kim Clijsters def. Caroline Wozniacki
  - Men's doubles: Lukáš Dlouhý / Leander Paes def. Mahesh Bhupathi / Mark Knowles
  - Women's doubles: Serena Williams / Venus Williams def. Cara Black / Liezel Huber
  - Mixed doubles: Carly Gullickson / Travis Parrott def. Cara Black / Leander Paes

=== Davis Cup ===
World Group Draw

- S-Seeded
- U-Unseeded
- * Choice of ground

First round 6–8 March
Buenos Aires, Argentina (clay)
1	Argentina	5
Netherlands	0
Ostrava, Czech Republic (indoor carpet)
8	France	2
Czech Republic	3
Birmingham, Alabama, USA (indoor hard)
4	United States	4
Switzerland	1
Poreč, Croatia (indoor hard)
5	Croatia	5
Chile	0
Malmö, Sweden (indoor carpet)
Israel	3
6	Sweden	2
Sibiu, Romania (indoor carpet)
Romania	1
3	Russia	4
Garmisch-Partenkirchen, Germany (indoor hard)
Austria	2
7	Germany	3
Benidorm, Spain (clay)
Serbia	1
2	Spain	4

Quarterfinals; 10–12 July
Ostrava, Czech Republic (indoor hard)
1	Argentina	2
Czech Republic	3
Poreč, Croatia (indoor clay)
4	United States	2
5	Croatia	3
Tel Aviv, Israel (indoor hard)
Israel	4
3	Russia	1
Marbella, Spain (clay)
7	Germany	2
2	Spain	3

Semifinals; 18–20 September
Poreč, Croatia (indoor clay)
Czech Republic	4
5	Croatia	1
Torre-Pacheco, Spain (clay)
Israel	1
2	Spain	4

Final; 4–6 December
Barcelona, Spain (indoor clay)
Czech Republic	0
2	Spain	5

World Group play-offs

Venue (surface)	Winning Team	Score	Losing Team
Rancagua, Chile (clay)	Chile	3–2	Austria (5)
Charleroi, Belgium (indoor clay)	Belgium (6)	3–2	Ukraine
Porto Alegre, Brazil (indoor clay)	Ecuador	3–2	Brazil (8)
Maastricht, Netherlands (indoor clay)	France (2)	4–1	Netherlands
Johannesburg, South Africa (indoor hard)	India (7)	4–1	South Africa
Belgrade, Serbia (indoor hard)	Serbia (3)	5–0	Uzbekistan
Helsingborg, Sweden (indoor hard)	Sweden (1)	3–2	Romania
Genoa, Italy (clay)	Switzerland (4)	3–2	Italy

=== Fed Cup ===
World Group Draw

- S-Seeded
- U-Unseeded
- * Choice of ground

Quarterfinals; 7–8 February
Moscow, Russia (indoor hard)
1	Russia	5
China	0
Orléans, France (indoor hard)
4	Italy	5
France	0
Surprise, Arizona, USA (hard)
Argentina	2
3	United States	3
Brno, Czech Republic (indoor carpet)
Czech Republic	4
2	Spain	1

Semifinals; 25–26 April
Castellaneta, Italy (clay)
1	Russia	1
4	Italy	4
Brno, Czech Republic (indoor hard)
3	United States	3
Czech Republic	2

Final; 7–8 November
Reggio Calabria, Italy (clay)
4	Italy	4
3	United States	0

=== Final ===
Italy
4
Circolo del Tennis, Reggio Calabria, Italy
7–8 November 2009
clay (outdoors)

United States
0

			1	2	3
1	(Italy) (United States)	Flavia Pennetta; Alexa Glatch	6; 3	6; 1
2	(Italy) (United States)	Francesca Schiavone; Melanie Oudin	7^{7} 6^{2}	6; 2
3	(Italy) (United States)	Flavia Pennetta; Melanie Oudin	7; 5	6; 2
4	(Italy) (United States)	Francesca Schiavone; Alexa Glatch				not played
5	(Italy) (United States)	Sara Errani / Roberta Vinci; Liezel Huber / Vania King	4; 6	6; 3	11; 9

World Group play-offs

Date: 25–26 April

Venue (surface)	Winning team	Score	Losing team
Lleida, Spain (clay)	Serbia	4–0	Spain (1)
Limoges, France (indoor clay)	France (2)	3–2	Slovakia
Frankfurt, Germany (clay)	Germany	3–2	China (3)
Mar del Plata, Argentina (clay)	Ukraine	5–0	Argentina (4)

=== Hopman Cup ===
Group A
Pos.	Country	W	L	Matches	Sets
1	Slovakia	3	0	8–1	12–3
2	Germany	2	1	4–5	10–10
3	United States	1	2	3–6	9–14
4	Australia	0	3	3–6	8–12

Group B
Pos.	Country	W	L	Matches	Sets
1	Russia	3	0	6–3	14–7
2	Italy	2	1	6–3	12–7
3	France	1	2	5–4	10–8
4	Chinese Taipei	0	3	1–8	3–17

==== Final ====
Slovakia
2
Burswood Entertainment Complex, Perth
9 January 2009, 18:00 AWST (UTC+8)
hard (indoors)

Russia
0

			1	2	3
1	(Slovakia) (Russia)	Dominika Cibulková; Dinara Safina	6^{4} 7^{7}	6; 1	6; 4
2	(Slovakia) (Russia)	Dominik Hrbatý; Marat Safin	6^{5} 7^{7}	7; 5	7^{7} 6^{4}
3	(Slovakia) (Russia)	Dominika Cibulková / Dominik Hrbatý; Dinara Safina / Marat Safin				not played

2009 Hopman Cup Champions
(Slovakia)
Slovakia
Third title

== ATP World Tour ==
See: 2009 ATP World Tour

=== Changes in No. 1 rank ===
1 January – 5 July: (Spain) Rafael Nadal
6 July – 31 December: (Switzerland) Roger Federer

=== ATP World Tour Finals ===
- London, United Kingdom (22 November – 29 November)
  - Singles Qualifiers: (Spain) Rafael Nadal, (Switzerland) Roger Federer, (United Kingdom) Andy Murray, (Serbia) Novak Djokovic, (Argentina) Juan Martín del Potro, ~~(United States) Andy Roddick~~, (Russia) Nikolay Davydenko, (Spain) Fernando Verdasco, (Sweden) Robin Söderling
  - Doubles Qualifiers: (Canada) Nestor / (Serbia) Zimonjić, (United States) Bryan / (United States) Bryan, (Czech Republic) Dlouhý / (India) Paes, (India) Bhupathi / (The Bahamas) Knowles, (Poland) Kubot / (Austria) Marach, (Czech Republic) Čermák / (Slovakia) Mertiňák, (Belarus) Mirnyi / (Israel) Ram, (Poland) Fyrstenberg / (Poland) Matkowski
    - Singles Final: (Russia) Nikolay Davydenko def. (Argentina) Juan Martín del Potro
    - Doubles Final: (United States) Bryan / (United States) Bryan def. (Belarus) Mirnyi / (Israel) Ram

=== ATP Masters 1000 ===
Tournament	Singles Winner	Runner-up	Score	Doubles Winners	Runners-up	Score
Indian Wells	(Spain) Rafael Nadal	(United Kingdom) Andy Murray	6–1, 6–2	(United States) Fish; (United States) Roddick	(Belarus) Mirnyi; (Israel) Ram	3–6, 6–1, 14–12
Miami	(United Kingdom) Andy Murray	(Serbia) Novak Djokovic	6–2, 7–5	(Belarus) Mirnyi; (Israel) Ram	(Australia) Fisher; (Australia) Huss	6–7(4), 6–2, 10–7
Monte Carlo	(Spain) Rafael Nadal	(Serbia) Novak Djokovic	6–3, 2–6, 6–1	(Canada) Nestor; (Serbia) Zimonjić	(United States) Bryan; (United States) Bryan	6–4, 6–1
Rome	(Spain) Rafael Nadal	(Serbia) Novak Djokovic	7–6^{2}, 6–2	(Canada) Nestor; (Serbia) Zimonjić	(United States) Bryan; (United States) Bryan	7–6(5), 6–3
Madrid	(Switzerland) Roger Federer	(Spain) Rafael Nadal	6–4, 6–4	(Canada) Nestor; (Serbia) Zimonjić	(Sweden) Aspelin; (South Africa) Moodie	6–4, 6–4
Montreal	(United Kingdom) Andy Murray	(Argentina) Juan Martín del Potro	6–7^{4}, 7–6^{3}, 6–1	(India) Bhupathi; (The Bahamas) Knowles	(Belarus) Mirnyi; (Israel) Ram	6–4, 6–3
Cincinnati	(Switzerland) Roger Federer	(Serbia) Novak Djokovic	6–1, 7–5	(Canada) Nestor; (Serbia) Zimonjić	(United States) Bryan; (United States) Bryan	3–6, 7–6(2), 15–13
Shanghai	(Russia) Nikolay Davydenko	(Spain) Rafael Nadal	7–6^{3}, 6–3	(France) Benneteau; (France) Tsonga	(Poland) Fyrstenberg; (Poland) Matkowski	6–2, 6–4
Paris	(Serbia) Novak Djokovic	(France) Gaël Monfils	6–2, 5–7, 7–6^{3}	(Canada) Nestor; (Serbia) Zimonjić	(Spain) Granollers; (Spain) Robredo	6–3, 6–4

=== Blue Group ===
Pos.	Country	Points	Matches	Sets
1.	Serbia	3–0	7–2	14–5
2.	Argentina	2–1	7–2	13–5
3.	Italy	1–2	3–6	6–13
4.	Russia	0–3	1–8	4–14

=== Red Group ===
Pos.	Country	Points	Matches	Sets
1.	Germany	3–0	7–2	15–8
2.	Sweden	2–1	5–4	13–10
3.	United States	1–2	4–5	11–13
4.	France	0–3	2–7	8–16

=== Serbia vs. Germany ===
Serbia
2
Düsseldorf, Germany
23 May 2009
clay

Germany
1

			1	2	3
1	(Serbia) (Germany)	Viktor Troicki; Rainer Schüttler	6; 4	7^{7} 6^{5}
2	(Serbia) (Germany)	Janko Tipsarević; Philipp Kohlschreiber	6; 2	6; 4
3	(Serbia) (Germany)	Nenad Zimonjić / Viktor Troicki; Nicolas Kiefer / Mischa Zverev	5; 7	6; 4	7; 10

== Sony Ericsson WTA Tour ==
See: 2009 WTA Tour

=== Changes in No. 1 rank ===
1 January – 1 February: (Serbia) Jelena Janković
2 February – 19 April: (United States) Serena Williams
20 April – 11 October: (Russia) Dinara Safina
12 October – 25 October: (United States) Serena Williams
26 October – 1 November: (Russia) Dinara Safina
2 November – 31 December: (United States) Serena Williams

=== WTA Tour Championships ===
- Doha, Qatar (27 October – 1 November)

Singles Finals

Semifinals
8	(Serbia) Jelena Janković	7	3	4
7	(United States) Venus Williams	5	6	6
4	(Denmark) Caroline Wozniacki	4	1^{r}
2	(United States) Serena Williams	6	0

Final
7	(United States) Venus Williams	2	6^{4}
2	(United States) Serena Williams	6	7

- Singles Round Robin Players: (Russia) Safina, (Russia) Dementieva, (Russia) Kuznetsova, (Belarus) Azarenka
- Singles Alternates: (Russia) Zvonareva, (Poland) Radwańska

Doubles Final

Finals
1	(Zimbabwe) Cara Black (United States) Liezel Huber	6^{0}	7	[7]
3	(Spain) Nuria Llagostera Vives (Spain) María José Martínez Sánchez	7	5	[10]

- Doubles Semifinalists: (Australia) Stosur/ (Australia) Stubbs, (United States) S Williams/ (United States) V Williams

=== Tournament of Champions ===
- Bali, Indonesia (4 November – 8 November)
  - Final: (France) Aravane Rezaï def. (France) Marion Bartoli, 7–5, retired

=== WTA Premier Tournaments ===
Tournament	Singles Winner	Runner-up	Score	Doubles Winners	Runners-up	Score
Sydney	(Russia) E Dementieva	(Russia) D Safina	6–3, 2–6, 6–1	(Chinese Taipei) Hsieh; (China) Peng	(France) Dechy; (Australia) Dellacqua	6–0, 6–1
Paris	(France) A Mauresmo	(Russia) E Dementieva	7–6(7), 2–6, 6–4	(Zimbabwe) Black; (United States) Huber	(Czech Republic) Peschke; (United States) Raymond	6–4, 3–6, [10–4]
Dubai	(United States) V Williams	(France) V Razzano	6–4, 6–2	(Zimbabwe) Black; (United States) Huber	(Russia) Kirilenko; (Poland) Radwańska	6–3, 6–3
Indian Wells	(Russia) V Zvonareva	(Serbia) A Ivanovic	7–6(5), 6–2	(Belarus) Azarenka; (Russia) Zvonareva	(Argentina) Dulko; (Israel) Pe'er	6–4, 3–6, [10–5]
Miami	(Belarus) V Azarenka	(United States) S Williams	6–3, 6–1	(Russia) Kuznetsova; (France) Mauresmo	(Czech Republic) Peschke; (United States) Raymond	4–6, 6–3, [10–3]
Charleston	(Germany) S Lisicki	(Denmark) C Wozniacki	6–2, 6–4	(United States) Mattek-Sands; (Russia) Petrova	(Latvia) Dekmeijere; (Switzerland) Schnyder	6–7(5), 6–2, [11–9]
Stuttgart	(Russia) S Kuznetsova	(Russia) D Safina	6–2, 6–4	(United States) Mattek-Sands; (Russia) Petrova	(Argentina) Dulko; (Italy) Pennetta	5–7, 6–3, [10–7]
Rome	(Russia) D Safina	(Russia) S Kuznetsova	6–3, 6–2	(Chinese Taipei) Hsieh; (China) Peng	(Slovakia) Hantuchová; (Japan) Sugiyama	7–5, 7–6(5)
Madrid	(Russia) D Safina	(Denmark) C Wozniacki	6–2, 6–4	(Zimbabwe) Black; (United States) Huber	(Czech Republic) Peschke; (United States) Raymond	4–6, 6–3, [10–6]
Warsaw	(Romania) A Dulgheru	(Ukraine) A Bondarenko	7–6(3), 3–6, 6–0	(United States) Kops-Jones; (United States) Mattek-Sands	(China) Yan; (China) Zheng	6–1, 6–1
Eastbourne	(Denmark) C Wozniacki	(France) V Razzano	7–6(5), 7–5	(Uzbekistan) Amanmuradova; (Japan) Sugiyama	(Australia) Stosur; (Australia) Stubbs	6–4, 6–3
Stanford	(France) M Bartoli	(United States) V Williams	6–2, 5–7, 6–4	(United States) S Williams; (United States) V Williams	(Chinese Taipei) Chan; (Romania) Niculescu	6–4, 6–1
Los Angeles	(Italy) F Pennetta	(Australia) S Stosur	6–4, 6–3	(Chinese Taipei) Chuang; (China) Yan	(Russia) Kirilenko; (Poland) Radwańska	6–0, 4–6, [10–7]
Cincinnati	(Serbia) J Janković	(Russia) D Safina	6–4, 6–2	(Zimbabwe) Black; (United States) Huber	(Spain) Llagostera Vives; (Spain) Martínez Sánchez	6–3, 0–6, [10–2]
Toronto	(Russia) E Dementieva	(Russia) M Sharapova	6–4, 6–3	(Spain) Llagostera Vives; (Spain) Martínez Sánchez	(Australia) Stosur; (Australia) Stubbs	2–6, 7–5, [11–9]
New Haven	(Denmark) C Wozniacki	(Russia) E Vesnina	6–2, 6–4	(Spain) Llagostera Vives; (Spain) Martínez Sánchez	(Czech Republic) Benešová; (Czech Republic) Hradecká	6–2, 7–5
Tokyo	(Russia) M Sharapova	(Serbia) J Janković	5–2 ret.	(Russia) Kleybanova; (Italy) Schiavone	(Slovakia) Hantuchová; (Japan) Sugiyama	6–4, 6–2
Beijing	(Russia) S Kuznetsova	(Poland) A Radwańska	6–2, 6–4	(Chinese Taipei) Hsieh; (China) Peng	(Russia) Kudryavtseva; (Russia) Makarova	6–3, 6–1
Moscow	(Italy) F Schiavone	(Belarus) O Govortsova	6–3, 6–0	(Russia) Kirilenko; (Russia) Petrova	(Russia) Kondratieva; (Czech Republic) Zakopalová	6–2, 6–2

== International Tennis Hall of Fame ==
- Class of 2008:
  - Andrés Gimeno, player
  - Monica Seles, player
  - Donald Dell, contributor
  - Robert Walter Johnson, contributor
