= Sea the Stars =

Irish-bred Thoroughbred racehorse and sire

Sea The Stars
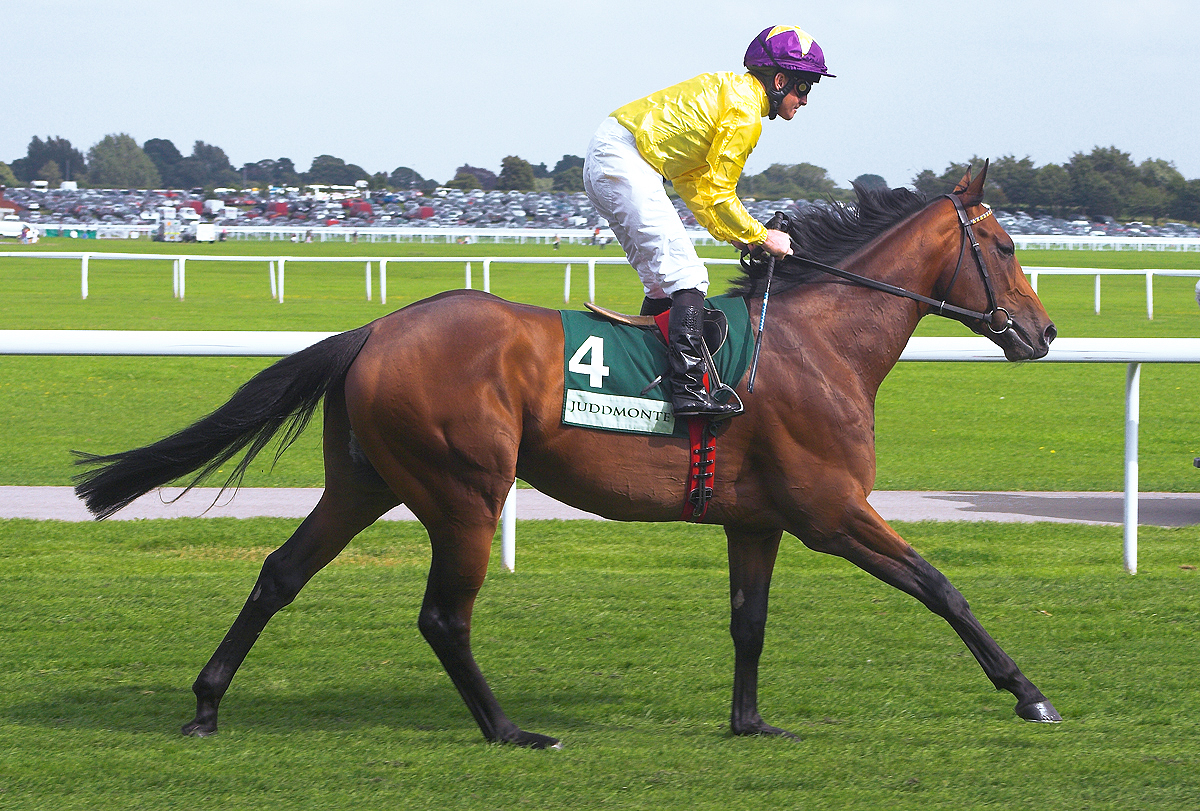
- Sire: Cape Cross
- Grandsire: Green Desert
- Dam: Urban Sea
- Damsire: Miswaki
- Sex: Stallion
- Foaled: 6 April 2006 (age 20)
- Country: Ireland
- Colour: Bay
- Breeder: Sunderland Holdings Ltd
- Owner: Christopher Tsui
- Trainer: John Oxx
- Record: 9: 8-0-0
- Earnings: £4,416,732

Major wins
- Beresford Stakes (2008); 2000 Guineas (2009); Epsom Derby (2009); Eclipse Stakes (2009); International Stakes (2009); Irish Champion Stakes (2009); Prix de l'Arc de Triomphe (2009)

Awards
- European Champion 3-Y-O Colt (2009); European Horse of the Year (2009); AHT Duralock Racing Award (2009); ROA Champion 3-Y-O Colt (2009); ROA Horse of the Year (2009); HRI Horse of the Year (2009); ITBA Champion 3-Y-O Colt (2009); 1st in World Thoroughbred Rankings (2009); Timeform rating: 140; British Champions Series Hall of Fame (2023)

Sea The Stars (foaled 6 April 2006) is a retired champion Irish Thoroughbred racehorse regarded as one of the greatest racehorses of all time. In 2009, he won the 2000 Guineas, the Derby and the Eclipse Stakes , as well as the International Stakes, the Irish Champion Stakes and the Prix de l'Arc de Triomphe in the same year. Sea The Stars is also a successful sire. His progeny have won classic races including the Derby, Irish Derby, the Oaks, the Irish Oaks and the Prix de L'Arc de Triomphe. By August 2026 his progeny had won 50 Group 1 races. He is the only horse in history to have won the 2000 Guineas, Epsom Derby and the Prix de l'Arc de Triomphe.

== Breeding ==
Sea The Stars was bred by Sunderland Holdings Ltd, the breeding operation of the Tsui family. Sea the Stars is a half brother to Epsom Derby winner Galileo, both being sons of Arc winner Urban Sea.

== Racing career ==
=== 2008: two-year-old season ===
Sea The Stars started his racing career at Curragh in July 2008. Still very green and boxed in in the final furlong, he finished a close fourth behind subsequent US Grade 1 winner Driving Snow.

He won his second race easily at Leopardstown by 2 1/2 lengths, taking the lead 2 furlongs out and never being threatened.

In the last race of his 2-year-old campaign, Sea The Stars won the Group 2 2008 Beresford Stakes at the Curragh by 1/2 length from stablemate Mourayan and Ballydoyle's Masterofthehorse. This turned out to be his closest race.

=== 2009: three-year-old season ===
Sea The Stars completed a three-year-old campaign, winning six Group 1 races in six months, including two English Classic races and one Europe's most prestigious 3-year-old and up race. His three-year-old record is described by many as the best of modern thoroughbred racing.

==== 2000 Guineas Stakes ====
Sea The Stars was rested over the winter, and John Oxx entered him in the 2009 2000 Guineas without a prep race. Despite this, he started 8-1 in the betting behind Craven Stakes winner Delegator (3/1f). There were concerns about his preparations because of a setback on 17 March due to a viral infection and a temperature. He rested for 2 weeks, which hampered his preparation for the Guineas. However, Oxx still wanted to give him his chance at a mile, and a good workout the week prior to the race encouraged Oxx to declare him.

Travelling well throughout the race, Sea The Stars pulled clear of the field in the final furlong, winning by one length from the favourite, with Gan Amhras 3/4 of a length behind in third. Michael Kinane, winning his fourth 2000 Guineas, later commented: "He's a classy horse and we've waited for him all winter. He's been crying out for this ground."

==== Epsom Derby ====
Despite doubts about his stamina and a strong field, notably from Ballydoyle, who fielded six of the twelve runners, Sea The Stars won the 2009 Epsom Derby, beating the favourite, Fame And Glory, and Masterofthehorse (making it a 1-2-3 to Ireland). Racing prominently behind the pacemakers, Sea The Stars traveled very well and slowly reeled in the leader from three furlongs out, taking the lead with 1 1/2 furlongs to go and keeping the lead all the way to the finish. Mick Kinane (winning his third Derby two weeks shy of his 50th birthday) said of the winner, "I was going so easy all the way, it was as if we were going in slow motion."

==== Eclipse Stakes ====
Sea the Stars was scratched from the 2009 Irish Derby due to the track conditions, but won the Eclipse Stakes at Sandown Park a week later. Always travelling well, he overtook the fading pacemakers early down the straight, forcing Kinane to commit earlier than expected. Rip Van Winkle came with a strong challenge two furlongs out, but Sea The Stars fought him off with a surge of acceleration, winning readily by one and a half lengths, with 2008 Breeders' Cup Turf winner Conduit five lengths behind in third.

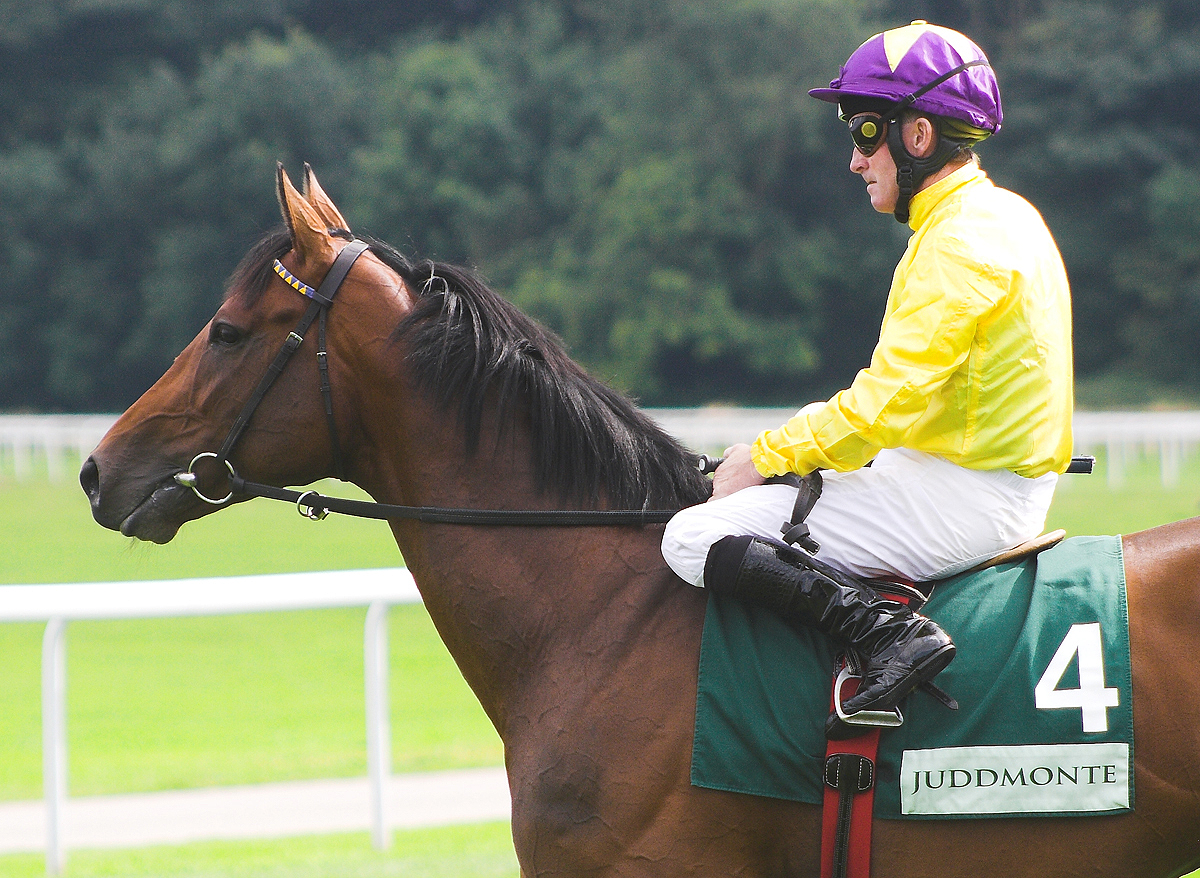
Sea The Stars at York

==== International Stakes ====
In August 2009, Sea the Stars won the Juddmonte International Stakes at York. Scaring off most of the opposition, he faced only four other horses were left in the race, three of them from Ballydoyle. Mastercraftsman, winner of four Group I races including the Irish 2000 Guineas and the St. James's Palace Stakes at Ascot, was the main opposition, with the two others acting as pacemakers. Tracking Mastercraftsman throughout the race, Kinane followed Johnny Murtagh through a narrowing gap created by the two pacemakers at the beginning of the straight. Sea The Stars powered past Mastercraftsman in the last furlong, taking the Group I race by a length and breaking the track record by 0.8 seconds.

==== Irish Champion Stakes ====
Next was the Irish Champion Stakes at Leopardstown in September 2009. It was Sea The Stars' first appearance in front of his home crowd since 2008, and the race was billed as a clash between him and Fame and Glory, who since finishing second in The Derby had won the Irish Derby by five lengths and been rested for two months. The race was highly anticipated, as the rematch during the Irish Derby was postponed due to ground conditions. Turning into the straight, Johnny Murtagh on board Fame and Glory took the initiative and got first run on Sea The Stars. A patient Kinane stayed on Murtagh's heels and with a powerful burst of speed went easily past Fame and Glory two furlongs out to win by two and a half lengths. Mastercraftsman finished third, another two and a half lengths behind Fame and Glory. After his win in the Irish Champion Stakes, Sea The Stars was awarded a 140 Timeform Rating.

==== Prix de l'Arc de Triomphe ====
On 4 October 2009, six months since his win in the 2000 Guineas, Sea The Stars lined up as the odds-on favourite for Europe's most prestigious 3-year-old and up race, the Prix de l'Arc de Triomphe in France. A large field of nineteen runners along with a long and difficult season were major concerns, with some thinking this was one race too many. The race featured nine other Group I winners, including unbeaten French filly Stacelita; Yorkshire Oaks and Pretty Polly Stakes winner Dar Re Mi; Irish Derby winner Fame and Glory; 2008 St Leger Stakes, 2008 Breeders' Cup Turf and King George VI and Queen Elizabeth Stakes winner Conduit; Prince of Wales's Stakes winner Vision d'Etat; Grand Prix de Paris and Prix Niel winner Cavalryman; and two-time Arc runner-up Youmzain. Quickly out of the stalls, Sea The Stars pulled very hard for the first two furlongs, was bumped and dropped back down the field. Kinane settled him and raced on in eighth and ninth position throughout the race. Turning into the straight, Sea The Stars stayed on the rail and seemed boxed in and in trouble. As the principals started to pick up, Kinane found a gap and challenged Stacelita alongside Dar Re Mi. Sea The Stars then produced a decisive turn of foot and went clear in a matter of strides. After going three lengths clear half a furlong out, he was eased down, winning by two lengths. He thus became the only horse to have won the 2000 Guineas, Epsom Derby, and Prix de l'Arc de Triomphe in the same year.

== Assessment ==
Sea The Stars took all the available major awards across Europe, including Champion 3 Year Old and Horse of the Year at the Cartier Racing Awards, Champion 3 Year Old and Horse of the Year at the Racehorse Owners Association Awards and Horse of the Year at the Irish Horse Racing Awards. He was officially rated the best horse in the world in 2009, with a rating of 136. He was rated six pounds superior to the second-rated horse, Goldikova. Timeform rated him 140, and the joint seventh best horse in their history, with only Sea Bird, Tudor Minstrel, Brigadier Gerard, Abernant, Ribot and Mill Reef rated superior (Frankel has also since surpassed this mark).

== Stud career ==
His retirement was announced on 13 October 2009 by trainer John Oxx.

On 27 October 2009, it was announced that Sea The Stars would stand at the Aga Khan's Gilltown Stud in Ireland. The 2008 Prix De l'Arc de Triomphe winner, Zarkava, was among the first mares booked to be covered by him.

On 6 March 2010, it was announced that Sea The Stars had his first five mares checked in foal. Among those is Zarkash of the unbeaten Zarkava. The other notable mares includes Bordighera - dam 2000 Guineas winner George Washington, the 2009 winner of the Darley Prix Jean Romanet (Fr-I) Alpine Rose, Centreofattention, a full sister to Irish Group 1 winner Holy Roman Emperor, and Seward's Folly, the dam of Group 2 winner Sayif. As of July 2010, Sea The Stars has covered 140 mares.

On 23 January 2011, it was reported that two days previously, his first foal had been born to the Australian horse Centreofattention at Castlebridge Stud in Ireland. The owner of Castlebridge Stud said, "We are delighted to have had the first Sea the Stars foal born, he looks a smashing colt with plenty of size and scope."

On 5 June 2014, Taghrooda won the Investec Oaks Stakes, marking the first Classic win for Sea The Stars as a sire. On 26 July, Taghrooda won Britain's premier weight-for-age race the King George VI and Queen Elizabeth Stakes.

On 6 July 2014, Sea The Moon, by Sea The Stars out of Sanwa, won the German Derby (Gr.1) by 11 lengths, making it the second Classic win for Sea The Stars as a sire from his first crop of three year olds.

His stud fee for 2010 was €85,000.

On 4 June 2016, Harzand, a member of the crop of Sea The Stars, out of Hazariya, won The Derby. This was followed up a month later winning the Irish Derby. Three other horses from the third crop have gone on since to a Group 1 race; Zelzal, Cloth of Stars and Mekhtaal.

His stud fee for 2024 is €200,000. In 2026 it was increased to €300,000.

=== Notable progeny ===
Foaled	Name	Sex (Note: Sex: c – colt; g – gelding; f – filly)	Major Results
2011	Sea The Moon	c	Deutsches Derby
2011	Taghrooda	f	Epsom Oaks; King George VI and Queen Elizabeth Stakes
2011	Vazira	f	Prix Saint-Alary (Note: Vazira finished second place in the Prix Saint-Alary, but was awarded first after the winner "We Are" was disqualified after having abnormal levels of testosterone from an ovarian tumour.)
2013	Zelzal	c	Prix Jean Prat
2013	Harzand	c	Epsom Derby; Irish Derby
2013	Cloth of Stars	c	Prix Ganay
2013	Mekhtaal	c	Prix d'Ispahan
2013	Shraaoh	g	Sydney Cup
2014	Stradivarius	c	Goodwood Cup (x4); Ascot Gold Cup (x3)
2014	Crystal Ocean	c	Prince of Wales's Stakes
2015	Sea of Class	f	Irish Oaks; Yorkshire Oaks
2015	Fifty Stars	c	Australian Cup
2016	Star Catcher	f	Irish Oaks; Prix Vermeille; British Champions Fillies and Mares Stakes
2017	Hukum	c	Coronation Cup; King George VI and Queen Elizabeth Stakes
2017	Miss Yoda	f	Preis der Diana
2018	Baaeed	c	Prix du Moulin; Queen Elizabeth II Stakes; Lockinge Stakes; Queen Anne Stakes; Sussex Stakes; International Stakes
2018	Just Fine	g	The Metropolitan
2018	Sea La Rosa	f	Prix de Royallieu
2018	Teona	f	Prix Vermeille
2019	Emily Upjohn	f	British Champions Fillies and Mares Stakes; Coronation Cup
2019	Sea Silk Road	f	Prix de Royallieu
2021	Sosie	c	Grand Prix de Paris; Prix Ganay; Prix d'Ispahan; Hong Kong Vase
2021	Aventure	f	Prix Vermeille; Prix Jean Romanet
2022	Daryz	c	Prix de l'Arc de Triomphe (twice); Prix Ganay; Prix Aga Khan IV
2023	Maltese Cross	c	Grand Prix de Paris
2023	Johanna Walsh	f	Irish Oaks

== Pedigree ==
Sea The Stars is by the top class European Miler Cape Cross, winner of the Lockinge Stakes, Celebration Mile and Queen Anne Stakes in the UK. Since retiring to stud, he has sired the winners of 19 Group 1 races worldwide, including Ouija Board (winner of Breeders' Cup Filly & Mare Turf (twice) and Epsom Oaks). Cape Cross stood at Kildangan Stud in Ireland.

Urban Sea, Sea the Stars' dam, was the winner of France's most prestigious race, the Prix de l'Arc de Triomphe. She is also one of the top broodmares of her generation. Sea The Stars is half brother to a number of stakes and group winners including: Galileo (1998 colt by Sadler's Wells), winner of Epsom Derby, Irish Derby and the King George VI and Queen Elizabeth Stakes and voted European Champion Three-Year-Old; Black Sam Bellamy (2000 colt by Sadler's Wells), winner of the Gran Premio del Jockey Club and Tattersalls Gold Cup; All Too Beautiful (2001 filly by Sadler's Wells), second in the Oaks; and, My Typhoon (2002 filly by Giant's Causeway), winner of Diana Handicap. Urban Sea is one of only a few mares to ever produce two Epsom Derby winners, namely Galileo and Sea the Stars.

Pedigree of Sea The Stars
Sire Cape Cross	Green Desert	Danzig	Northern Dancer
Sire Cape Cross	Green Desert	Danzig	Pas De Nom
Sire Cape Cross	Green Desert	Foreign Courier	Sir Ivor
Sire Cape Cross	Green Desert	Foreign Courier	Courtly Dee
Sire Cape Cross	Park Appeal	Ahonoora	Lorenzaccio
Sire Cape Cross	Park Appeal	Ahonoora	Helen Nichols
Sire Cape Cross	Park Appeal	Balidaress	Balidar
Sire Cape Cross	Park Appeal	Balidaress	Innocence
Dam Urban Sea	Miswaki	Mr. Prospector	Raise a Native
Dam Urban Sea	Miswaki	Mr. Prospector	Gold Digger
Dam Urban Sea	Miswaki	Hopespringseternal	Buckpasser
Dam Urban Sea	Miswaki	Hopespringseternal	Rose Bower
Dam Urban Sea	Allegretta	Lombard	Agio
Dam Urban Sea	Allegretta	Lombard	Promised Lady
Dam Urban Sea	Allegretta	Anatevka	Espresso
Dam Urban Sea	Allegretta	Anatevka	Almyra

== See also ==
- List of racehorses
