= Christopher Tsui =

Hong Kong businessman and racehorse owner

- Born: 1981 (age 43–44); British Hong Kong
- Education: Cass Business School
- Occupation(s): Businessman, racehorse owner, professional golfer
- Known for: Sea The Stars
- Parent: David Tsui (father)

Christopher Tsui (born 1981 in Hong Kong) is a businessman and a Champion Thoroughbred racehorse owner. Educated in Paris and London, he graduated in 2008 from Cass Business School with a master's in Management. He is also a professional golfer who qualified to play on the Canadian Professional Golf Tour.

== Career ==
He is best known as the owner of Sea The Stars, the World Champion thoroughbred racehorse who completed an unbeaten three-year-old career by winning the 2000 Guineas, The Derby and the Prix de l'Arc de Triomphe in the same year, the only horse to do so in the history of thoroughbred racing. Sea The Stars also won the Eclipse Stakes, the International Stakes and the Irish Champion Stakes in the same year, all major international races. Christopher Tsui is the youngest known owner to have won any of these races.

Sea The Stars was bred by Sunderland Holding Inc, the Tsui family's breeding operation. Founded by Christopher's father, David Tsui began buying horses in the early 1990s and raced a stable in France. David Tsui most famously owned 1993 Arc winner Urban Sea who is the dam of Sea The Stars and who died several years ago. However, in an interview at Epsom Downs Racecourse, Christopher Tsui said that his mother, Ling, a special adviser to the Ministry of Labour for the Chinese Government, studies pedigrees and breeding patterns and does all the research that has led to the family's racing success. Since becoming involved in the sport, Sunderland Holding Inc has bred a number of successful horses including Galileo, Black Sam Bellamy, All Too Beautiful, Melikah, Cherry Hinton, My Typhoon, and Urban Ocean.

== Awards ==
In 2009, Christopher Tsui was voted Owner of the Year twice, once by the British Racehorse Owners Association and another by the Horserace Writers and Photographers Association.
