= Debussy (horse) =

Irish-bred Thoroughbred racehorse

- Sire: Diesis
- Grandsire: Sharpen Up
- Dam: Opera Comique
- Damsire: Singspiel
- Sex: Stallion
- Foaled: 26 February 2006
- Country: Ireland
- Colour: Bay/Brown
- Breeder: Darley
- Owner: Princess Haya; Godolphin
- Trainer: John Gosden; Mahmood Al Zarooni
- Record: 22: 6-0-2
- Earnings: £825,857

Major wins
- Blue Riband Trial Stakes (2009); Huxley Stakes (2010); Arlington Million (2010)

Debussy (foaled 26 February 2006) is an Irish Thoroughbred racehorse who won the Arlington Million in 2010. Debussy was trained by John Gosden.
