= Black Bear Island =

Irish Thoroughbred racehorse

- Sire: Sadler's Wells
- Grandsire: Northern Dancer
- Dam: Kasora
- Damsire: Darshaan
- Sex: Stallion
- Foaled: 2006
- Country: Ireland
- Colour: Bay
- Breeder: Tower Bloodstock
- Owner: Michael Tabor & Sue Magnier
- Trainer: Aidan O'Brien
- Record: 5:2-1-1
- Earnings: 109,013

Major wins
- Dante Stakes (2009)
- Last updated on June 4, 2009

Black Bear Island (2006–2010) was a Thoroughbred racehorse from Ireland. Sired by Sadler's Wells from the dam Kasora, Black Bear Island was a full brother to six time Group One winner High Chaparral.

In the lead-up to The Derby, Black Bear Island raced in the Prix La Force at Longchamp and finished 3rd, followed by a win in the Dante Stakes. He finished tenth in the Derby. After being sold to American connections, Black Bear Island was shipped to Arlington Park and ran 2nd in the Grade One Secretariat Stakes. He subsequently raced unplaced in three further starts.

Sold to a partnership led by former Hollywood Park chairman RD Hubbard, Black Bear Island was narrowly defeated in the Grade 1 Secretariat Stakes on the Arlington Million card before joining Los Angeles–based trainer Julio Canani, for whom he was eighth in the Hollywood Derby in November.

According to the Daily Racing Form, Black Bear Island was being prepared for a US turf campaign in 2010 when he suffered a fatal injury.

== Pedigree ==
Pedigree of Black Bear Island
Sire Sadler's Wells 1981	Northern Dancer 1961	Nearctic	Nearco
Sire Sadler's Wells 1981	Northern Dancer 1961	Nearctic	Lady Angela
Sire Sadler's Wells 1981	Northern Dancer 1961	Natalma	Native Dancer
Sire Sadler's Wells 1981	Northern Dancer 1961	Natalma	Almahmoud
Sire Sadler's Wells 1981	Fairy Bridge 1975	Bold Reason	Hail To Reason
Sire Sadler's Wells 1981	Fairy Bridge 1975	Bold Reason	Lalun
Sire Sadler's Wells 1981	Fairy Bridge 1975	Special	Forli
Sire Sadler's Wells 1981	Fairy Bridge 1975	Special	Thong
Dam Kasora 1993	Darshaan 1981	Shirley Heights	Mill Reef
Dam Kasora 1993	Darshaan 1981	Shirley Heights	Hardiemma
Dam Kasora 1993	Darshaan 1981	Delsy	Abdos
Dam Kasora 1993	Darshaan 1981	Delsy	Kelty
Dam Kasora 1993	Kozana 1982	Kris	Sharpen Up
Dam Kasora 1993	Kozana 1982	Kris	Doubly Sure
Dam Kasora 1993	Kozana 1982	Koblenza	Hugh Lupus
Dam Kasora 1993	Kozana 1982	Koblenza	Kalimara
