= Beresford Stakes =

Flat horse race in Ireland

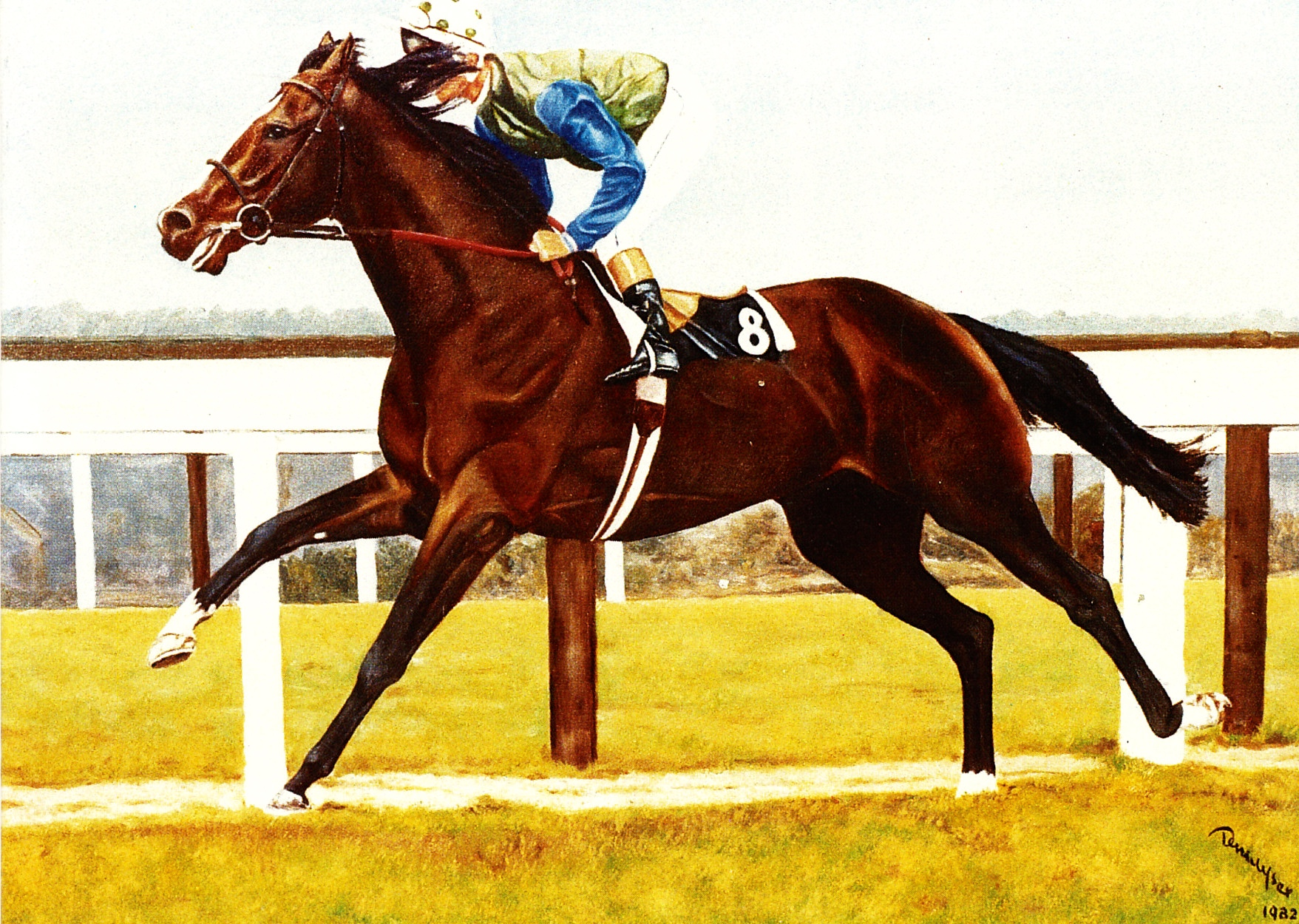
- Assert, oil on canvas Painting by Bob Demuyser (1920–2003)
- Class: Group 2
- Location: Curragh Racecourse; County Kildare, Ireland
- Race type: Flat / Thoroughbred
- Website: Curragh

Race information
- Distance: 1 mile (1,609 metres)
- Surface: Turf
- Track: Right-handed
- Qualification: Two-year-olds
- Weight: 9 st 3 lb Allowances; 3 lb for fillies Penalties; 5 lb for Group 1 winners 3 lb for Group 2 winners
- Purse: €111,600 (2022); 1st: €70,800

Beresford Stakes
2026
Noble Exhibit	City of Dubai	Drumbeat

Previous years
2025
Hawk Mountain	Geryon	Al Haarith
2024
Hotazhell	Tennessee Stud	Windlord
2023
Deepone	Chief Little Rock	Grosvenor Square
2022
Crypto Force	Adelaide River	Young Ireland
2021
Luxembourg	Manu Et Corde	Tuwaiq

2020-2011
2020
High Definition	Monaasib	Snapraeterea
2019
Innisfree	Shekhem	Gold Maze
2018
Japan	Mount Everest	Power Of Now
2017
Saxon Warrior	Delano Roosevelt	Warm The Voice
2016
Capri	Yucatan	Exemplar
2015
Port Douglas	True Solitaire	Beacon Rock
2014
Ol' Man River	Clonard Street	Battle Of Marathon
2013
Geoffrey Chaucer	Oklahoma City	Altruistic
2012
Battle Of Marengo	Orgilgo Bay	Probably
2011
David Livingston	Akeed Mofeed	Athens

2010-2001
2010
Casamento	Mawaakef	Robin Hood
2009
St Nicholas Abbey	Layali Al Andalus	Passion For Gold
2008
Sea The Stars	Mourayan	Masterofthehorse
2007
Curtain Call	Domestic Fund	Going Public
2006
Eagle Mountain	Capital Exposure	Silent Waves
2005
Septimus	Rekaab	Altius
2004
Albert Hall	Merger	Sant Jordi
2003
Azamour	Relaxed Gesture	Mustameet
2002
Alamshar	Brian Boru	Feabhas
2001
Castle Gandolfo	Camp David	Brooklyn

2000-1991
2000
Turnberry Isle	Sligo Bay	Vinnie Roe
1999
Lermontov	Barrier Reef	Sharp Focus
1998
Festival Hall	Port Bayou	Tarfaa
1997
Saratoga Springs	Hanzanar	Timekeeper
1996
Johan Cruyff	Cambodian	Quws
1995
Ahkaam	Sheraka	Ceirseach
1994
Burden Of Proof	Fill The Bill	Mister Positive
1993
Sheridan	City Nights	Bawardi
1992
Frenchpark	Scribe	Wootton Rivers
1991
El Prado	Colorific	Political Fact

1990-1988
1990
Approach The Bench	Roger Ramjet	Dowland
1989
Victory Piper	Armanasco	Hero's Welcome
1988
Classic Fame	Prince Ibrahim	Free Sweater

The Beresford Stakes is a Group 2 flat horse race in Ireland open to two-year-old thoroughbreds. It is run at the Curragh over a distance of 1 mile (1,609 metres), and it is scheduled to take place each year in September or October.

== History ==
The event was sponsored by Panasonic in the mid-1980s, and during this time it held Group 2 status. Juddmonte Farms took over the sponsorship in 1988. Its most illustrious winner was Nijinsky in 1969.

The race was relegated to Group 3 level in 1992. It regained Group 2 status in 2003.

The Beresford Stakes was added to the Breeders' Cup Challenge series in 2012. The winner earned an invitation to compete in the Breeders' Cup Juvenile Turf. It was dropped from the series in 2013. Since 2017 the Beresford Stakes has been part of the Road to the Kentucky Derby.

== Records ==
Leading jockey since 1950 (6 wins):

- Liam Ward – Kildoon (1953), Carezza (1955), Scissors (1963), Hibernian (1967), Nijinsky (1969), Minsky (1970)

Leading trainer since 1950 (23 wins):

- Aidan O'Brien - Johan Cruyff (1996), Saratoga Springs (1997), Festival Hall (1998), Lermontov (1999), Turnberry Isle (2000), Castle Gandolfo (2001), Albert Hall (2004), Septimus (2005), Eagle Mountain (2006), St Nicholas Abbey (2009), David Livingston (2011), Battle of Marengo (2012), Geoffrey Chaucer (2013), Ol' Man River (2014), Port Douglas (2015), Capri (2016), Saxon Warrior (2017), Japan (2018), Innisfree (2019), High Definition (2020), Luxembourg (2021), Hawk Mountain (2025), Noble Exhibit (2026)

== Winners since 1977 ==
Year	Winner	Jockey	Trainer	Time
1977	Icelandic	Christy Roche	Paddy Prendergast	1:44.80
1978	Just a Game	Tommy Carberry	Clem Magnier	1:42.90
1979	Huguenot	Tommy Murphy	Vincent O'Brien	1:46.70
1980	Euclid	George McGrath	Vincent O'Brien
1981	Assert	Christy Roche	David O'Brien	1:42.50
1982	Danzatore	Pat Eddery	Vincent O'Brien
1983	Sadler's Wells	Pat Eddery	Vincent O'Brien	1:44.50
1984	Gold Crest	Pat Eddery	Vincent O'Brien	1:40.70
1985	Flash of Steel	Michael Kinane	Dermot Weld	1:46.80
1986	Gulf King	Steve Cauthen	Paul Kelleway	1:39.30
1987	Insan	Richard Quinn	Paul Cole	1:47.20
1988	Classic Fame	John Reid	Vincent O'Brien	1:46.50
1989	Victory Piper	John Reid	Barry Hills	1:43.00
1990	Approach the Bench	Billy Newnes	John Mulhern	1:44.10
1991	El Prado	Lester Piggott	Vincent O'Brien	1:43.80
1992	Frenchpark	Pat Shanahan	Con Collins	1:44.30
1993	Sheridan	Willie Carson	John Dunlop	1:47.30
1994	Burden of Proof	Christy Roche	Charles O'Brien	1:48.60
1995	Ahkaam	Michael Kinane	Dermot Weld	1:46.10
1996	Johan Cruyff	Christy Roche	Aidan O'Brien	1:44.30
1997	Saratoga Springs	Christy Roche	Aidan O'Brien	1:47.70
1998	Festival Hall	Jamie Spencer	Aidan O'Brien	1:47.20
1999	Lermontov	Paul Scallan	Aidan O'Brien	1:47.30
2000	Turnberry Isle	Michael Kinane	Aidan O'Brien	1:46.40
2001	Castle Gandolfo	Michael Kinane	Aidan O'Brien	1:44.70
2002	Alamshar	Johnny Murtagh	John Oxx	1:44.90
2003	Azamour	Johnny Murtagh	John Oxx	1:42.00
2004	Albert Hall	Jamie Spencer	Aidan O'Brien	1:43.80
2005	Septimus	Seamie Heffernan	Aidan O'Brien	1:43.10
2006	Eagle Mountain	Kieren Fallon	Aidan O'Brien	1:43.40
2007	Curtain Call	Fran Berry	Jessica Harrington	1:46.74
2008	Sea the Stars	Michael Kinane	John Oxx	1:42.36
2009	St Nicholas Abbey	Johnny Murtagh	Aidan O'Brien	1:41.60
2010	Casamento	Pat Smullen	Michael Halford	1:43.52
2011	David Livingston	Seamie Heffernan	Aidan O'Brien	1:46.23
2012	Battle of Marengo	Joseph O'Brien	Aidan O'Brien	1:47.77
2013	Geoffrey Chaucer	Joseph O'Brien	Aidan O'Brien	1:42.70
2014	Ol' Man River	Joseph O'Brien	Aidan O'Brien	1:39.38
2015	Port Douglas	Emmet McNamara	Aidan O'Brien	1:43.38
2016	Capri	Ryan Moore	Aidan O'Brien	1:45.05
2017	Saxon Warrior (Note: The 2017 and 2018 runnings took place at Naas due to redevelopment work at The Curragh)	Ryan Moore	Aidan O'Brien	1:46.45
2018	Japan	Ryan Moore	Aidan O'Brien	1:38.68
2019	Innisfree	Donnacha O'Brien	Aidan O'Brien	1:50.06
2020	High Definition	Seamie Heffernan	Aidan O'Brien	1:45.28
2021	Luxembourg	Seamie Heffernan	Aidan O'Brien	1:40.88
2022	Crypto Force	Colin Keane	Michael O' Callaghan	1:44.30
2023	Deepone	Billy Lee	Paddy Twomey	1:41.42
2024	Hotazhell	Shane Foley	Jessica Harrington	1:38.16
2025	Hawk Mountain	Ronan Whelan	Aidan O'Brien	1:43.36
2026	Noble Exhibit	Wayne Lordan	Aidan O'Brien	1:41.53

== Earlier winners ==
- 1875: Richelieu
- 1880: Barcaldine
- 1891: Wordsworth
- 1910: Cheery Pat
- 1917: Judea
- 1919: Royal Ashe
- 1920: Ballyheron
- 1930: Spiral
- 1943: Arctic Sun
- 1945: Linaria
- 1946: Grand Weather
- 1949: Dark Warrior
- 1950: Setello
- 1951: Grand Morning
- 1952: Northern Gleam
- 1953: Kildoon
- 1954: Arctic Time
- 1955: Carezza
- 1956: Viviptic
- 1957: Articeelagh
- 1958: Sunny Court
- 1959: Lynchris
- 1960: Paris Princess
- 1961: Richmond
- 1962: Pontifex
- 1963: Scissors
- 1964: Jealous
- 1965: Boleslas
- 1966: Sovereign Slipper
- 1967: Hibernian
- 1968: Deep Run
- 1969: Nijinsky
- 1970: Minsky
- 1971: Boucher
- 1972: Chamozzle
- 1973: Saritamer
- 1974: Mark Anthony
- 1975: Whistling Deer
- 1976: Orchestra

== See also ==
- Horse racing in Ireland
- List of Irish flat horse races
