= Urban Sea =

American-bred Thoroughbred racehorse

- Racing silks of David Tsui
- Sire: Miswaki
- Grandsire: Mr. Prospector
- Dam: Allegretta
- Damsire: Lombard
- Sex: Mare
- Foaled: 18 February 1989
- Died: 2 March 2009 (aged 20)
- Country: United States
- Colour: Chestnut
- Breeder: Marystead Farm
- Owner: David Tsui
- Trainer: Jean Lesbordes
- Record: 23: 8-3-3
- Earnings: US$1,704,553 (equivalent)

Major wins
- Prix Gontaut-Biron (1993); Prix Exbury (1993); Prix de l'Arc de Triomphe (1993); Prix d'Harcourt (1994)

Awards
- Europe Champion Older Mare (1993); Ireland’s Broodmare of the Year (2001); England's Top Broodmare (2001); ITBA Outstanding Broodmare (2005); ITBA Special Achievement Award (2009)

Urban Sea (18 February 1989 – 2 March 2009) was an American bred Thoroughbred racemare best known for winning France's most prestigious race, the Prix de l'Arc de Triomphe, in 1993 and for her importance as a world-class broodmare. She is one of ten mares to produce two Derby winners, namely Galileo and Sea the Stars. She is the only mare in the 21st century to produce two Derby winners. None has produced three winners of this race.

== Background ==
Bred by Paul de Moussac's Marystead Farm in Kentucky, Urban Sea was a chestnut filly by Miswaki, a stakes-winning son of the leading sire in North America, Mr. Prospector. Her dam was Allegretta, a Group 3-placed mare by the German sire Lombard. Allegretta also produced Classic winner King's Best by Kingmambo and established a thriving female family. In addition to Urban Sea, other notable broodmares by Allegretta include Group 3 winner Allez Les Trois by Riverman (dam of Classic winner of Anabaa Blue), Anzille by Plugged Nickle (dam German Group 1 winner Anzillero), Turbaine by Trempolino (dam of stakes winners Tertullian and Terek, and third dam of Arc winner Torquator Tasso), and Altruiste (dam of stakes winners Terrubi and Alpine Snow).

French trainer Jean Lesbordes conditioned a small stable of Thoroughbreds in France for Hong Kong businessman David Tsui. In 1990 he purchased Urban Sea at the Deauville yearling sale on behalf of Tsui for the price of FF280,000 (approximately US$50,000).

== Racing career ==
Winner of a maiden race at age two in 1991, the following year the three-year-old Urban Sea won two listed races in her seven starts, capturing the French Prix de la Seine at Longchamp Racecourse in May 1992 and the Challenge d'Or Piaget at Deauville-La Touques Racecourse. In June, Urban Sea ran in two Group One races, finishing sixth in the Prix de Diane and third in the Prix Vermeille. She was shipped to Düsseldorf, Germany where she finished third in the Arag Preis (German 1000 Guineas). Sent to North America in the fall to compete in races for fillies and mares, at Woodbine Racetrack in Toronto, Urban Sea ran second to fellow French horse Hatoof in the 1992 E. P. Taylor Stakes. At Santa Anita Park in California, she finished last in the Yellow Ribbon Invitational Stakes.

Urban Sea began her 1993 campaign in March with a win in the Prix Exbury. She traveled to Sha Tin Racecourse in Hong Kong in April, where she finished sixth in the Hong Kong Cup. Back in France, she was fifth in the Prix Jean de Chaudenay. After taking second place in the Prince of Wales's Stakes at Royal Ascot, she won a French listed race in July, and in August the Prix Gontaut-Biron. In October, Urban Sea made it three in a row when she scored an upset win in France's most prestigious race, the Prix de l'Arc de Triomphe. In the process of defeating fourteen Group 1 winners, including males, she was ridden in the Arc by Eric Saint-Martin, son of French jockey Yves Saint-Martin.

Following her Arc victory, Urban Sea was invited to compete in the Japan Cup at the end of November at Tokyo Racecourse, where she ran eighth.

Sent back to the track at age five, Urban Sea began her 1994 racing season in May with a win in the Prix d'Harcourt. She finished third in the Prix Ganay. In what proved to be her last race, she ran fourth in the Coronation Cup at Epsom Downs in England. A fetlock injury ended her racing career.

== Breeding record ==
Owner David Tsui sent Urban Sea to Ireland as a broodmare for his Sunderland Holdings, where she became one of the world's most successful broodmares. Her 1997 filly, Melikah, was auctioned in 1998 for €1,500,000, the highest-ever price paid for a yearling at the Deauville sales; she won the Pretty Polly Stakes. Her 1998 colt, Galileo, won the Derby and Irish Derby, plus the King George VI and Queen Elizabeth Stakes. As a result, Urban Sea was named the 2001 Broodmare of the Year in both England and Ireland. Her 2002 filly, My Typhoon, set a record price for a filly foal of US$2,955,000 when sold at the Tattersalls Sale, and became a Grade I winner in the United States. When Urban Sea's 2006 foal Sea the Stars won The Derby in 2009, she became one of the few mares to have foaled two Derby winners – the last mare to have done so was Windmill Girl, the dam of Blakeney (1969) and Morston (1973). Sea The Stars also won the Prix de l'Arc de Triomphe, and Urban Sea became only the second Arc de Triomphe-winning mare to foal a winner of that race (Detroit, the dam of Carnegie, is the other).

In 2009, Urban Sea delivered a bay colt by Invincible Spirit, later named Born to Sea. She died on 2 March 2009 as a complication of foaling.

Urban Sea's importance as a broodmare has been magnified by the success of her offspring at stud. In particular, Galileo was the leading sire in Great Britain and Ireland in 2008 and from 2010 through 2018 inclusive. Multiple classic winners, including the undefeated Frankel, descend from Urban Sea through Galileo. Sea the Stars has also become an important sire, whose major winners include Stradivarius and Harzand. Her four daughters have all become stakes-producing broodmares as well.

The 2018 Derby winner Masar is inbred to Urban Sea, descending from Galileo on his sire's side and from Melikah on his dam's side.

=== Foals ===
c = colt, f = filly

Foaled	Name	Sex	Sire	Major Wins	Record	Prize Money
1996	Urban Ocean	c	Bering	Gallinule Stakes	14: 4–0–1	£57,210
1997	Melikah	f	Lammtarra	Pretty Polly Stakes	4: 1–1–1	£83,280
1998	Galileo	c	Sadler's Wells	Ballysax Stakes, Derrinstown Stud Derby Trial, Epsom Derby, Irish Derby, King George VI and Queen Elizabeth Stakes	8: 6–1–0	£1,621,110
1999	Black Sam Bellamy	c	Sadler's Wells	Gran Premio del Jockey Club, Tattersalls Gold Cup	18:4-2-3	£444,207
2000	Atticus	c	Sadler's Wells		unraced
2001	All Too Beautiful	f	Sadler's Wells	Middleton Stakes	6: 3–1–1	£163,413
2002	My Typhoon	f	Giant's Causeway	Just A Game Handicap, Diana Handicap	22: 9–3–3	$1,308,361
2004	Cherry Hinton	f	Green Desert		5: 0–1–2	£27,069
2005	Sea's Legacy	c	Green Desert		unraced
2006	Sea the Stars	c	Cape Cross	Beresford Stakes, 2000 Guineas, Epsom Derby, Eclipse Stakes, International Stakes, Irish Champion Stakes, Prix de l'Arc de Triomphe	9: 8–0–0	£4,417,163
2009	Born To Sea	c	Invincible Spirit	Blenheim Stakes	8: 1–3–0	£276,048

== Pedigree ==
Pedigree of Urban Sea (USA), chestnut mare, 1989
Sire Miswaki	Mr. Prospector	Raise a Native	Native Dancer
Sire Miswaki	Mr. Prospector	Raise a Native	Raise You
Sire Miswaki	Mr. Prospector	Gold Digger	Nashua
Sire Miswaki	Mr. Prospector	Gold Digger	Sequence
Sire Miswaki	Hopespringseternal	Buckpasser	Tom Fool
Sire Miswaki	Hopespringseternal	Buckpasser	Busanda
Sire Miswaki	Hopespringseternal	Rose Bower	Princequillo
Sire Miswaki	Hopespringseternal	Rose Bower	Lea Lane
Dam Allegretta	Lombard	Agio	Tantieme
Dam Allegretta	Lombard	Agio	Aralia
Dam Allegretta	Lombard	Promised Lady	Prince Chevalier
Dam Allegretta	Lombard	Promised Lady	Belle Sauvage
Dam Allegretta	Anatevka	Espresso	Acropolis
Dam Allegretta	Anatevka	Espresso	Babylon
Dam Allegretta	Anatevka	Almyra	Birkhahn
Dam Allegretta	Anatevka	Almyra	Alameda
