= Miswaki =

American-bred Thoroughbred racehorse

- Sire: Mr. Prospector
- Grandsire: Raise a Native
- Dam: Hopespringseternal
- Damsire: Buckpasser
- Sex: Stallion
- Foaled: 1978
- Country: United States
- Colour: Chestnut
- Breeder: Bruce Campbell & Early Bird Stud
- Owner: Etti Plesch
- Trainer: François Boutin (France); Woody Stephens (USA)
- Record: 13: 6-4-1
- Earnings: US$232,320

Major wins
- Prix Yacowlef (1980); Prix de la Salamandre (1980); Charles Hatton Stakes (1981)

Awards
- Leading broodmare sire in Great Britain & Ireland (1999, 2001)

Miswaki (February 22, 1978 – December 17, 2004) was an American-bred Thoroughbred racehorse that was a Group One winner in France and a stakes race winner in the United States. He was an important sire of 97 stakes race winners and was the Leading broodmare sire in Great Britain and Ireland in 1999 and 2001.

== Breeding and ownership ==
Bred in Florida, Miswaki was sired by Mr. Prospector, who became a two-time leading sire in North America and a nine-time leading broodmare sire in North America. His dam was Hopespringseternal, a daughter of Buckpasser, the 1966 American Horse of the Year and Hall of Fame inductee that became a four-time leading broodmare sire in North America.

Miswaki was purchased and raced by Etti Plesch, a prominent horsewoman in Europe, who as at the end of 2011, is the only female to have won The Derby twice, doing it first in 1961 with Psidium then with Henbit in 1980. In addition, she won the 1970 Prix de l'Arc de Triomphe with Sassafras.

== Racing career ==
Miswaki was conditioned for racing by one of France's leading trainers, François Boutin. Raced at age two, he made four starts on grass in 1980, winning the Prix Yacowlef at Deauville-La Touques Racecourse in his debut. After a runner-up finish in Deauville's Group One Prix Morny, he won the Group One Prix de la Salamandre at Longchamp. Sent to England's Newmarket Racecourse for the Group One Dewhurst Stakes, Miswaki ran third to winner, Storm Bird. For his three-year-old campaign in 1981, Miswaki was sent to race in the United States, where he made nine starts for Hall of Fame trainer Woody Stephens. The colt won three allowance races plus the ungraded Charles Hatton Stakes at Elmont, New York's Belmont Park.

== At stud ==
Beginning in 1982, Miswaki spent his entire 22-year stud career at Walmac International Farm in Lexington, Kentucky. Pensioned in August 2004, he died on December 17 that same year and was buried in the equine cemetery at Walmac International.

The two most notable of Miswaki's successful progeny are the great racing mare Urban Sea, that won the 1993 Prix de l'Arc de Triomphe and is the dam of Galileo and Sea the Stars, and Black Tie Affair, the 1991 American Horse of the Year.

Miswaki sired:

- Bachelor Duke, won the 2004 Irish 2,000 Guineas
- Black Tie Affair, 1991 American Horse of the Year & Breeders' Cup Classic winner
- Etoile Montante, filly whose wins include the 2003 G1 Prix de la Forêt in France and the 2004 G2 Palomar Handicap in the United States.
- Germignaga, won the 1996 Oaks d'Italia
- Kistena, multiple stakes winner in France including the Group One Prix de l'Abbaye de Longchamp
- Marvelous Crown, won 1994 Japan Cup
- Misil, won three Group One races including the 1993 Gran Premio del Jockey Club
- Umatilla, won Karrakatta Plate, successful sire in Australia
- Urban Sea, 1993 Prix de l'Arc de Triomphe winner

Miswaki was the damsire of:

- Dalakhani, won the 2003 G1 Prix du Jockey Club
- Daylami, 1999 European Horse of the Year, winner of the G1 Breeders' Cup Turf
- Galileo, 2001 European Champion Three-Year-Old Colt
- Hernando, won the 1993 G1 Prix du Jockey Club
- Jimwaki, won the 1997 Grande Premio Brasil
- Landseer, won 2002 G1 Poule d'Essai des Poulains
- My Typhoon, multiple stakes winner
- Sadowa, won the 2002 Premio Regina Elena
- Sea the Stars, 2009 European Horse of the Year, winner of The Derby and Prix de l'Arc de Triomphe
- Talkin Man, 1994 Canadian Champion Two-Year-Old Colt
- Silence Suzuka, won 1998 Takarazuka Kinen
- That's the Plenty, won 2003 Kikuka Sho

Pedigree of Miswaki
Sire Mr. Prospector	Raise a Native	Native Dancer	Polynesian
Sire Mr. Prospector	Raise a Native	Native Dancer	Geisha
Sire Mr. Prospector	Raise a Native	Raise You	Case Ace
Sire Mr. Prospector	Raise a Native	Raise You	Lady Glory
Sire Mr. Prospector	Gold Digger	Nashua	Nasrulllah
Sire Mr. Prospector	Gold Digger	Nashua	Segula
Sire Mr. Prospector	Gold Digger	Sequence	Count Fleet
Sire Mr. Prospector	Gold Digger	Sequence	Miss Dogwood
Dam Hopespringseternal	Buckpasser	Tom Fool	Menow
Dam Hopespringseternal	Buckpasser	Tom Fool	Gaga
Dam Hopespringseternal	Buckpasser	Busanda	War Admiral
Dam Hopespringseternal	Buckpasser	Busanda	Businesslike
Dam Hopespringseternal	Rose Bower	Princequillo	Prince Rose
Dam Hopespringseternal	Rose Bower	Princequillo	Cosquilla
Dam Hopespringseternal	Rose Bower	Lea Lane	Nasrulllah
Dam Hopespringseternal	Rose Bower	Lea Lane	Lea Lark
