= Cape Cross (horse) =

Irish-bred Thoroughbred racehorse

- Sire: Green Desert
- Grandsire: Danzig
- Dam: Park Appeal
- Damsire: Ahonoora
- Sex: Stallion
- Foaled: 13 March 1994
- Died: 21 April 2017 (aged 23)
- Country: Ireland
- Colour: Bay
- Breeder: Darley Stud
- Trainer: Godolphin Racing
- Record: 19: 5-3-3
- Earnings: £266,105

Major wins
- Lockinge Stakes (1998); Queen Anne Stakes (1999); Celebration Mile (1999)
- Last updated on June, 06 2009

Cape Cross (13 March 1994 – 21 April 2017) was an Irish-bred Thoroughbred racehorse. He is a son of the July Cup winner Green Desert and Cheveley Park Stakes, winner Park Appeal who was the Champion two-year-old filly in England and Ireland in 1984.

== Racing career ==
As a two-year-old Cape Cross raced twice, winning his maiden on the second attempt. His first start as a three-year-old was in the Craven Stakes, where he finished third. This was followed by an eighth place in the 2000 Guineas. He only won once as a three-year-old. He won the Lockinge Stakes as a four-year-old, when starting a 20/1 outsider. He won twice as a five-year-old, the Queen Anne Stakes at Royal Ascot and the Celebration Mile.

== Stud career ==
Since retiring to stud, Cape Cross has sired the winners of 21 Group 1 races worldwide. He stood at the Kildangan Stud in Ireland at a fee of €35,000. In March 2016 he was retired from stallion duty after suffering fertility problems. He was euthanized on 21 April 2017 due to infirmities of old age.

=== Notable progeny ===
c = colt, f = filly, g = gelding

Foaled	Name	Sex	Major Wins
2001	Ouija Board	f	Epsom Oaks, Irish Oaks, Breeders' Cup Filly & Mare Turf (twice), Hong Kong Vase, Prince of Wales's Stakes, Nassau Stakes
2002	Able One	c	Champions Mile (twice), Hong Kong Mile
2002	Seachange	f	New Zealand 1000 Guineas, Mudgway Stakes (twice), Stoney Bridge Stakes (twice), Telegraph Handicap, Waikato Sprint
2006	Sea the Stars	c	2000 Guineas, Epsom Derby, Eclipse Stakes, International Stakes, Irish Champion Stakes, Prix de l'Arc de Triomphe
2007	Behkabad	c	Grand Prix de Paris
2009	He’s Your Man	g	Epsom Handicap
2009	Nayarra	f	Gran Criterium
2012	Golden Horn	c	Epsom Derby, Eclipse Stakes, Irish Champion Stakes, Prix de l'Arc de Triomphe
2012	Guignol	c	Grosser Preis von Bayern (twice), Grosser Preis von Baden
2013	Awtaad	c	Irish 2000 Guineas
2014	Walton Street	g	Canadian International Stakes

Cape Cross also sired Rising Cross, who won the 2006 Park Hill Stakes and later foaled Croix du Nord in Japan, the winner of the 2024 Hopeful Stakes and the 2025 Tōkyō Yūshun.

== Pedigree ==
Pedigree of Cape Cross
Sire Green Desert	Danzig	Northern Dancer	Nearctic
Sire Green Desert	Danzig	Northern Dancer	Natalma
Sire Green Desert	Danzig	Pas De Nom	Admiral's Voyage
Sire Green Desert	Danzig	Pas De Nom	Petitioner
Sire Green Desert	Foreign Courier	Sir Ivor	Sir Gaylord
Sire Green Desert	Foreign Courier	Sir Ivor	Attica
Sire Green Desert	Foreign Courier	Courtly Dee	Never Bend
Sire Green Desert	Foreign Courier	Courtly Dee	Tulle
Dam Park Appeal	Ahonoora	Lorenzaccio	Klairon
Dam Park Appeal	Ahonoora	Lorenzaccio	Phoenissa
Dam Park Appeal	Ahonoora	Helen Nichols	Martial
Dam Park Appeal	Ahonoora	Helen Nichols	Quaker Girl
Dam Park Appeal	Balidaress	Balidar	Will Somers
Dam Park Appeal	Balidaress	Balidar	Violet Bank
Dam Park Appeal	Balidaress	Innocence	Sea Hawk II
Dam Park Appeal	Balidaress	Innocence	Novitiate
