= 2006 in sports =

2006 in sports describes the year's events in world sport.

== Alpine skiing ==
- Alpine skiing World Cup
  - Men’s overall season champion: Benjamin Raich (Austria)
  - Women’s overall season champion: Janica Kostelić (Croatia)

== American football ==
- Super Bowl XL – the Pittsburgh Steelers (AFC) won 21–10 over the Seattle Seahawks (NFC)
  - Location: Ford Field
  - Attendance: 68,206
  - MVP: Hines Ward, WR (Pittsburgh)
- Rose Bowl (2005 season):
  - The Texas Longhorns won 41–38 over the Southern California Trojans to win the BCS National Championship
- March 14 - former San Diego Chargers quarterback Drew Brees signs a 6-year, $60 million deal with the New Orleans Saints after the Miami Dolphins were suggested by medical staff to not sign Brees due to a career-threatening shoulder injury he suffered at the end of the 2005 season. After Brees had immediate success and broke several records in New Orleans, this signing is believed by many as the greatest free agency signing in NFL history, tied with the Denver Broncos’ signing of Peyton Manning in 2012.
- August 19 - Barrow High School played the first organized football game in the Arctic against Delta Junction High School.
- MVP of Super Bowl XL is Pittsburgh Steelers wide receiver Hines Ward.
- Reggie White, Troy Aikman, John Madden, Warren Moon, Harry Carson, and Rayfield Wright are elected to the Pro Football Hall of Fame.

== Association football ==
- January 1 – Australia officially leaves the Oceania Football Confederation and joins the Asian Football Confederation

International competitions

- 2006 African Cup of Nations – Egypt
- 2006 FIFA World Cup – Italy
- 2006 FIFA Club World Cup – Sport Club Internacional
- Copa Libertadores 2006 – Sport Club Internacional
- UEFA Champions League 2005-06 – FC Barcelona

Domestic competitions

- Argentina Primera División – Boca Juniors (Clausura)
- Brazil Campeonato Brasileiro – São Paulo FC
- England Premiership – Chelsea
- France Ligue 1 – Lyon
- Germany Bundesliga – Bayern Munich
- Italy Serie A – Inter Milan awarded title after initial winners Juventus were stripped of the title due to involvement in the 2006 Serie A match fixing scandal.
- Spain La Liga – FC Barcelona
- Portugal Liga – FC Porto

== Athletics ==
- March – 2006 Commonwealth Games held in Melbourne
- May 12 – Justin Gatlin equals Asafa Powell's 100 m world record time of 9.77 seconds in Doha, Qatar. Gatlin was initially given a time of 9.76, which would have been a new record, but a few days later the time was corrected to 9.77
- June 11 – Asafa Powell equals the 100 m world record once again, as he ran the distance in 9.77 seconds at Gateshead, England
- August 18 – Asafa Powell runs the 100 m in a record-equalling 9.77 seconds for a third time, this time in Zürich
- August – 2006 European Championships in Athletics held in Gothenburg, Swedeno

== Baseball ==
- March 20 – Japan wins the first World Baseball Classic, defeating Cuba 10–6 in the championship game.
- May 28 – Barry Bonds hits his 715th career home run in a 6–3 home loss to the Colorado Rockies, passing Babe Ruth for second place on the career list and setting a new record for left-handed hitters.
- July 11 – American League wins the MLB All–Star Game by a score of 3–2 on Michael Young's game-winning 2-run triple in the 9th inning.
- October 14 – Detroit Tigers sweep the Oakland Athletics in the American League Championship Series and advance to their first World Series since 1984.
- October 27 – St. Louis Cardinals win the 2006 World Series 4–1 in Game 5. The St. Louis Cardinals (10 wins) advance to 2nd place for most World Series wins after the New York Yankees (27).

== Basketball ==
- Miami Heat defeated the Dallas Mavericks in 6 games in the NBA Finals series for Miami's first-ever NBA World Championship. Finals MVP Dwyane Wade rallied four consecutive 35-point games to come back from a two games to none deficit and win four straight.
- University of Florida wins its first ever NCAA title, defeating UCLA 73–57. George Mason, an 11 seed, makes it to the final four
- University of Maryland wins its first ever NCAA women's title, defeating Duke 77–75 in overtime.
- January 22 – Los Angeles Lakers star Kobe Bryant scores 81 points in a win over the Toronto Raptors, becoming only the second player in league history to score at least 80 points in one game. It was the second highest individual point total in NBA history (Second only to Wilt Chamberlain's 100 point performance).
- Chinese Basketball Association – Guangdong Southern Tigers defeat Bayi Rockets (4–1) in finals.
- National Basketball League (Australia) – Melbourne Tigers defeat the Sydney Kings 3–0 in best-of-five final series
- Euroleague – Russian power CSKA Moscow dethrones the two-time defending Euroleague champions Maccabi Tel Aviv (Israel) 73–69 at Sazka Arena in Prague. This is CSKA's fifth title in the competition, but first since 1971. Third place goes to TAU Cerámica, which defeated FC Barcelona 87–82 in an all-Spanish affair.
- The Detroit Shock stunned the 2005 WNBA Champion Sacramento Monarchs in 5 games in the 2006 WNBA Finals.

== Beach Soccer ==
- November 12 - Brazil wins the 2nd edition of the FIFA Beach Soccer World Cup on home soil.

== Bowling ==
- February 19 - Tommy Jones wins the 63rd U.S. Open
- March 26 - Walter Ray Williams, Jr. wins the Denny's PBA World Championship
- April 9 - Chris Barnes wins the Dexter Tournament of Champions
- Tommy Jones is named the Chris Schenkel PBA Player of the Year
- October 29 - Doug Kent wins the USBC Masters

== Boxing ==
- January 7 – Carlos Manuel Baldomir upsets Zab Judah by unanimous decision and is crowned world welterweight champion by the WBC.
- March 3 – Welshman Joe Calzaghe defeats American Jeff Lacy by landslide unanimous decision for the WBO-IBF super middleweight title unification. Calzaghe's stellar performance propelled him to #9 in Ring Magazine's pound for pound list.
- April 1 – Sergei Liakhovich wins the WBO world heavyweight title from Lamon Brewster by unanimous decision.
- April 8 – Floyd Mayweather Jr. defeats Zab Judah by unanimous decision to win the IBF welterweight title. A mini-riot ensued as Roger Mayweather, Floyd's uncle and trainer, runs into the ring retaliating to a low blow and rabbit punch by Judah. The fight resumed and Mayweather won by decision.
- April 22 – Wladimir Klitschko wins the IBF world heavyweight title from Chris Byrd by TKO in round 7.
- June 10 – Bernard Hopkins defeats Antonio Tarver by unanimous to take the light heavyweight world championship.
- June 17 – Winky Wright and Jermain Taylor fight ends in a draw for the undisputed middleweight championship of the world in Memphis, Tennessee
- 13 to July 23 – 36th European Amateur Boxing Championships held in Plovdiv, Bulgaria
- August 12 – Oleg Maskaev knocks out Hasim Rahman in the 12th round to win the WBC Heavyweight title.
- November 4 Floyd Mayweather Jr. becomes the WBC and linear Welterweight champion after he defeats Carlos Baldomir by unanimous decision.
- November 11 Wladimir Klitschko defends his IBF heavyweight title by defeating American contender Calvin Brock winning by a stunning knockout in the seventh round.
- November 18 Manny Pacquiao wins by technical knockout in his third and rubber match against Erik Morales
- December 9 Jermain Taylor defends his middleweight title as he defeats Kassim Ouma

== Canadian football ==
- November 19 – The BC Lions win the 94th Grey Cup game, defeating the Montreal Alouettes 25–14 at Canad Inns Stadium in Winnipeg.

== Curling ==
- Olympic champions:
  - Men's – Canada (Brad Gushue, Mark Nichols, Russ Howard, Jamie Korab, Mike Adam)
  - Women's – Sweden (Anette Norberg, Eva Lund, Cathrine Lindahl, Anna Svärd, Ulrika Bergman)
- World champions:
  - Men's – Scotland (David Murdoch, Ewan MacDonald, Warwick Smith, Euan Byers, Peter Smith)
  - Women's – Sweden (Anette Norberg, Eva Lund, Cathrine Lindahl, Anna Svärd, Ulrika Bergman)

== Cycling ==
- 2006 Tour de France was won by Floyd Landis of the US, who subsequently failed a drugs test
- 2006 UCI Cyclo-cross World Championships held in Zeddam, Netherlands, and won by Erwin Vervecken (men) and Marianne Vos (women)
- 2006 Giro d'Italia is won by Ivan Basso.
- 2006 Vuelta a España is won by Alexander Vinokourov.

== Figure skating ==
- World Figure Skating Championships held in Calgary, Alberta, Canada
  - Men's champion: Stéphane Lambiel
  - Ladies' champion: Kimmie Meissner
  - Pair skating champions: Pang Qing and Tong Jian
  - Ice dancing champions: Albena Denkova and Maxim Staviski

== Floorball ==
- Men's World Floorball Championships
  - Champion: Sweden
- Women's under-19 World Floorball Championships
  - Champion: Sweden
- European Cup
  - Men's champion: Warberg IC
  - Women's champion: IKSU innebandy

== Gaelic Athletic Association ==
- Gaelic football
  - All–Ireland Senior Football Championship, Kerry 4–15 Mayo 3-05
  - National Football League, Kerry 2–11 Galway 0–11
- Hurling
  - All–Ireland Senior Hurling Championship, Kilkenny 1–16 Cork 1–13

== Gliding ==
- World Gliding Championships held at Eskilstuna, Sweden
  - Open Class Winner: Michael Sommer, Germany; Glider: Alexander Schleicher ASW 22 BLE

== Golf ==
Men's professional

- Masters Tournament – Phil Mickelson
- U.S. Open – Geoff Ogilvy
- British Open – Tiger Woods
- PGA Championship – Tiger Woods
- PGA Tour money leader – Tiger Woods with $9,941,563

Men's amateur

- British Amateur – Julien Guerrier
- U.S. Amateur – Richie Ramsay
- European Amateur – Rory McIlroy

Women's professional

- Kraft Nabisco Championship – Karrie Webb
- LPGA Championship – Se Ri Pak
- U.S. Women's Open – Annika Sörenstam
- Women's British Open – Sherri Steinhauer
- LPGA Tour money leader – Lorena Ochoa with $2,592,872

Team event

- Team Europe wins the Ryder Cup for the third straight time, defeating Team USA 18½–9½.

== Handball ==
- 2006 European Men's Handball Championship: France
- 2006 European Women's Handball Championship: Norway

== Horse racing ==
Steeplechases

- Cheltenham Gold Cup – War of Attrition
- Grand National – Numbersixvalverde

Flat races

- Australia – Melbourne Cup won by Delta Blues
- Canadian Triple Crown:
  1. Queen's Plate – Edenwold
  2. Prince of Wales Stakes – Shillelagh Slew
  3. Breeders' Stakes – Royal Challenger
- Dubai – Dubai World Cup won by Electrocutionist
- France – Prix de l'Arc de Triomphe won by Rail Link
- Ireland – Irish Derby won by Dylan Thomas
- Japan – Japan Cup won by Deep Impact
- English Triple Crown:
  1. 2,000 Guineas Stakes – George Washington
  2. The Derby – Sir Percy
  3. St. Leger Stakes – Sixties Icon
- United States Triple Crown:
  1. Kentucky Derby – Barbaro
  2. Preakness Stakes – Bernardini. Barbaro suffered a breakdown during the race and died from complications of the injury in January 2007.
  3. Belmont Stakes – Jazil
- Breeders' Cup World Thoroughbred Championships:
  1. Breeders' Cup Classic – Invasor
  2. Breeders' Cup Distaff – Round Pond
  3. Breeders' Cup Filly & Mare Turf – Ouija Board
  4. Breeders' Cup Juvenile – Street Sense
  5. Breeders' Cup Juvenile Fillies – Dreaming of Anna
  6. Breeders' Cup Mile – Miesque's Approval
  7. Breeders' Cup Sprint – Thor's Echo
  8. Breeders' Cup Turf – Red Rocks

== Ice hockey ==
- February 17 – Swedish women's ice hockey team defeats the United States in the semi-final round in the 2006 Olympic games. This marks the first time that either the United States or Canada has lost to anyone other than each other.
- February 26 – Sweden defeats Finland 3–2 to capture the men's gold medal at the 2006 Olympic games.
- April 8 – Wisconsin Badgers defeat the Boston College Eagles for the NCAA National Championship.
- Stanley Cup Finals – Carolina Hurricanes defeat the Edmonton Oilers 4 games to 3 to win the Stanley Cup

== Lacrosse ==
- World Lacrosse Championship – Canada 15–10 USA in London, Ontario, breaking a 28-year US winning streak.
- National Lacrosse League – Champion's Cup won by Colorado Mammoth over Buffalo Bandits 16–9 at the HSBC Arena, Buffalo, New York
- Major League Lacrosse – Steinfeld Cup won by Philadelphia Barrage over Denver Outlaws 23–12 at The Home Depot Center, Carson, California

== Mixed martial arts ==
The following is a list of major noteworthy MMA events during 2006 in chronological order.

Date	Event	Alternate Name/s	Location	Attendance	PPV Buyrate	Notes
January 16	UFC Ultimate Fight Night 3	Ultimate Fight Night 3	(United States) Las Vegas, Nevada, USA	1,008	—	—
February 4	UFC 57: Liddell vs. Couture 3	—	(United States) Las Vegas, Nevada, USA	11,000	400,000	—
February 4	Cage Rage 15: Adrenalin Rush	—	London, England	—	—	—
February 26	Pride 31: Unbreakable	Pride 31: Dreamers	Saitama, Japan	—	—	—
March 4	UFC 58: USA vs Canada	—	(United States) Las Vegas, Nevada, USA	9,569	300,000	This was the first UFC event to hold a lightweight fight since UFC 49.
March 10	Strikeforce: Shamrock vs. Gracie	—	(United States) San Jose, California, USA	18,265	—	Strikeforce's first MMA event, after 20 years of kickboxing promotion. The event featured Frank Shamrock in his first fight since March 2003.
March 15	K-1 Hero's 4	—	Tokyo, Japan	—	—	—
April 2	Pride Bushido 10	—	Tokyo, Japan	—	—	—
April 6	UFC Ultimate Fight Night 4	Ultimate Fight Night 4	(United States) Las Vegas, Nevada, USA	843	—	—
April 15	UFC 59: Reality Check	—	(United States) Anaheim, California, USA	13,814	425,000	—
April 22	Cage Rage 16: Critical Condition	—	London, England	—	—	—
April 29	IFL: Legends Championship 2006	—	(United States) Atlantic City, New Jersey, USA	—	—	IFL's first event; Start of 2006 IFL Season 1.
May 3	K-1 Hero's 5	—	Tokyo, Japan	—	—	—
May 5	Pride Total Elimination Absolute	—	Osaka, Japan	—	—	Opening round to Pride GP 2006 openweight tournament.
May 27	UFC 60: Hughes vs. Gracie	—	(United States) Los Angeles, California, USA	14,765	620,000	The event featured Royce Gracie's return to the UFC since April 1995.
June 3	IFL: Championship 2006	—	(United States) Atlantic City, New Jersey, USA	—	—	End of 2006 IFL Season 1.
June 4	Pride Bushido Survival 2006	Pride Bushido 11; Pride Bushido Survival	Saitama, Japan	—	—	Opening round to Pride GP 2006 welterweight tournament.
June 9	Strikeforce: Revenge	—	(United States) San Jose, California, USA	10,374	—	This event featured Alistair Overeem's American debut. Prior to this Overeem fought exclusively in Europe and Japan since 1999.
June 24	The Ultimate Fighter 3 Finale	—	(United States) Las Vegas, Nevada, USA	—	—	Randy "The Natural" Couture was inducted into the UFC Hall of Fame at this event.
June 28	UFC Ultimate Fight Night 5	Ultimate Fight Night 5	(United States) Las Vegas, Nevada, USA	606	—	—
July 1	Pride Critical Countdown Absolute	—	Saitama, Japan	—	—	Quarterfinals to Pride GP 2006 openweight tournament.
July 1	Cage Rage 17: Ultimate Challenge	—	London, England	—	—	—
July 8	UFC 61: Bitter Rivals	—	(United States) Las Vegas, Nevada, USA	11,167	775,000	—
July 22	WFA: King of the Streets	—	(United States) Los Angeles, California, USA	—	—	WFA's last event. The event featured Bas Rutten's only fight after retiring in 1999.
August 5	K-1 Hero's 6	—	Tokyo, Japan	—	—	—
August 17	UFC Fight Night 6	—	(United States) Las Vegas, Nevada, USA	—	—	—
August 26	UFC 62: Liddell vs. Sobral	—	(United States) Las Vegas, Nevada, USA	9,859	500,000	—
August 26	Pride Bushido 12	Pride Bushido Survival 2nd Round	Nagoya, Japan	—	—	Quarterfinals to Pride GP 2006 welterweight tournament.
September 9	IFL: Portland	—	(United States) Portland, Oregon, USA	—	—	Start of 2006 IFL Season 2.
September 10	Pride Final Conflict Absolute	—	Saitama, Japan	—	—	Semifinals and final to Pride GP 2006 openweight tournament. Mirko Filipović becomes the Pride 2006 openweight Grand Prix champion.
September 23	IFL: Gracie vs. Miletich	—	(United States) Moline, Illinois, USA	—	—	—
September 23	UFC 63: Hughes vs. Penn	—	(United States) Anaheim, California, USA	12,604	400,000	—
September 30	Cage Rage 18: Battleground	—	London, England	—	—	—
October 7	Strikeforce: Tank vs. Buentello	—	(United States) Fresno, California, USA	4,437	—	—
October 9	K-1 Hero's 7	—	Yokohama, Japan	—	—	—
October 10	Ortiz vs. Shamrock 3: The Final Chapter	UFC Fight Night 6.5	(United States) Hollywood, Florida, USA	3,510	—	This event featured a third fight between, Tito Ortiz and Ken Shamrock. The show was aired on Spike TV and received 5.7 million viewers.
October 14	UFC 64: Unstoppable	—	(United States) Las Vegas, Nevada, USA	10,173	300,000	—
October 21	Pride 32: The Real Deal	—	(United States) Las Vegas, Nevada, USA	11,727	40,000	This was the first Pride FC event held in the USA.
November 2	IFL: World Championship Semifinals	—	(United States) Portland, Oregon, USA	—	—	—
November 5	Pride Bushido 13	Pride Bushido Survival Finals	Yokohama, Japan	—	—	Semifinals and final to Pride GP 2006 welterweight tournament. Kazuo Misaki becomes the Pride 2006 welterweight Grand Prix champion.
November 11	The Ultimate Fighter 4 Finale	—	(United States) Las Vegas, Nevada, USA	—	—	—
November 11	K-1 Hero's Lithuania 2006	—	Lithuania	—	—	—
November 18	UFC 65: Bad Intentions	—	(United States) Sacramento, California, USA	14,666	500,000	—
December 8	Strikeforce: Triple Threat	—	(United States) San Jose, California, USA	8,701	—	This event featured one of the first major women's MMA bouts. Between Gina Carano and Elaina Maxwell.
December 13	UFC Fight Night: Sanchez vs Riggs	UFC Fight Night 7	(United States) San Diego, California, USA	—	—	—
December 29	IFL: Championship Final	—	(United States) Uncasville, Connecticut, USA	—	—	End of 2006 IFL Season 2.
December 30	UFC 66: Liddell vs. Ortiz 2	—	(United States) Paradise, Nevada, USA	13,761	1,050,000	This is the first MMA event to receive over a million PPV buys.
December 31	Pride Shockwave 2006	—	Saitama, Japan	48,709	—	—
December 31	K-1 PREMIUM 2006 Dynamite!!	—	Osaka, Japan	51,930	—	Event featured ten K-1 Hero's MMA bouts and four K-1 kickboxing bouts.

== Radiosport ==
- 13th Amateur Radio Direction Finding World Championship held in Primorsko, Bulgaria.

== Rugby league ==
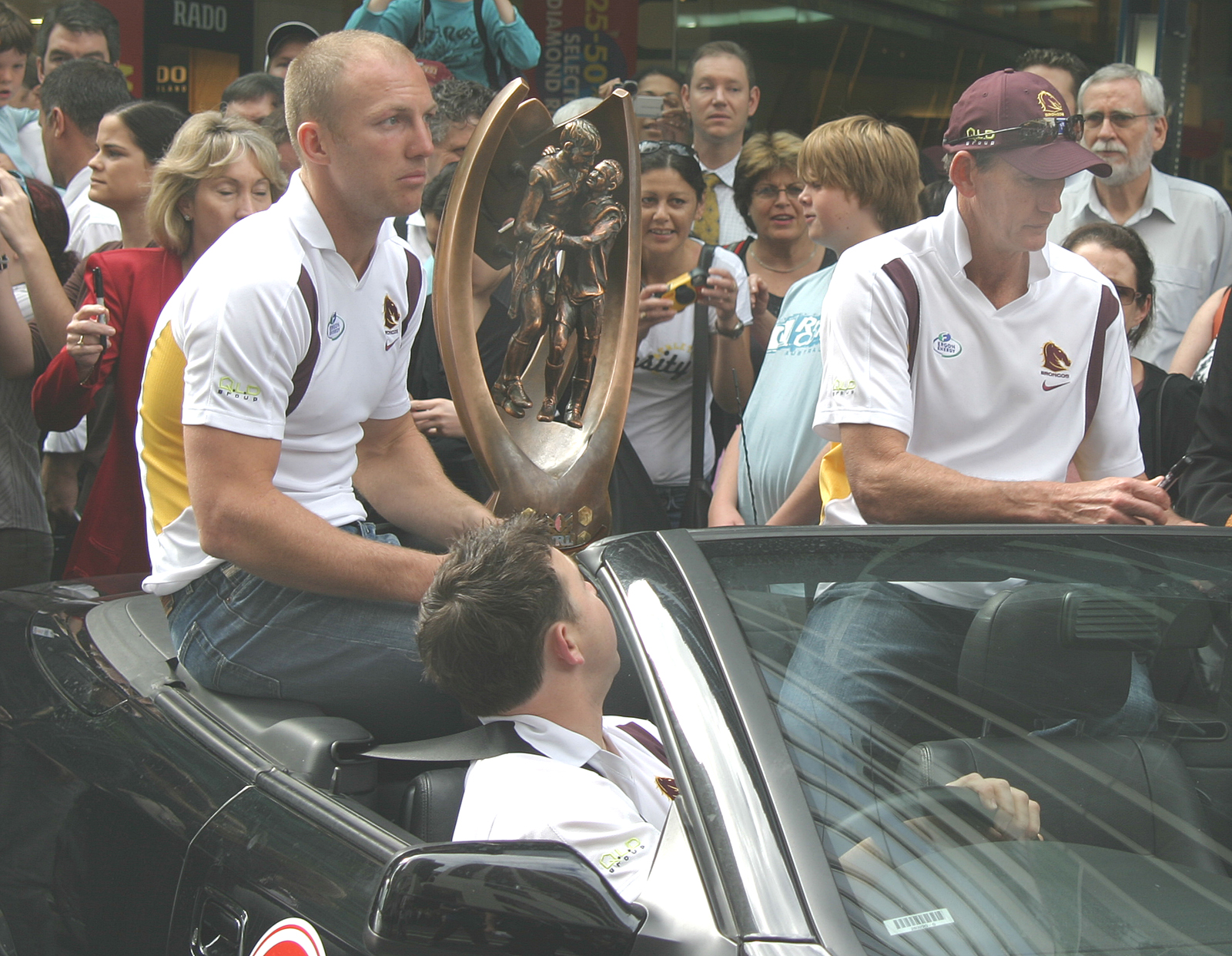
The Brisbane Broncos won the 2006 NRL Premiership.

- February 3 at Galpharm Stadium, Huddersfield – 2006 World Club Challenge match is won by the Bradford Bulls 30–10 over the Wests Tigers before 19,207
- March 18 at Canberra Stadium, Canberra – record for most points scored in Australian premiership history is broken with 102 scored in the Newcastle Knights' 70–32 win over the Canberra Raiders
- May 5 at Suncorp Stadium, Brisbane – 2006 ANZAC Day Test is won by Australia 50–12 against New Zealand before 44,191
- July 5 at Telstra Dome, Melbourne – 2006 State of Origin is won by Queensland in the third and deciding match against New South Wales 16–14 before 54,833
- August 26 at Twickenham Stadium, London – 2006 Challenge Cup tournament culminates in St Helens R.F.C.'s 42–12 win over Huddersfield Giants in the final before 65,187
- October 1 at Telstra Stadium, Sydney – 2006 NRL premiership culminates in the Brisbane Broncos' 15–8 win over the Melbourne Storm in the Grand Final before 79,609
- October 14 at Old Trafford, Manchester – Super League XI culminates in St Helens R.F.C.'s 26–4 win over Hull F.C. in the Grand Final before 72,582
- November 25 at Sydney Football Stadium, Sydney – 2006 Tri-nations tournament culminates in Australia's 16–12 win over New Zealand in the final before 27,325

== Rugby union ==
- 112th Six Nations Championship series is won by France
- Sale Sharks win the Guinness Premiership
- London Wasps win the 2005-06 Powergen Cup
- Biarritz win the Top 14
- Ulster win the Celtic League
- Munster win the 2005-06 Heineken Cup
- The Crusaders win the Super 14 final in foggy conditions.
- The All Blacks win the 2006 Tri Nations Series
- The Blue Bulls and the Free State Cheetahs share the Currie Cup in Bloemfontein after the final went into extra time and was drawn 28–28

== Ski jumping ==
- Four Hills Tournament – Janne Ahonen and Jakub Janda are joint winners, the first time in the tournament's 54-year history that it has been shared

== Ski mountaineering ==
- February–March – 2006 World Championship of Ski Mountaineering held in the Province of Cuneo in Italy

== Speed skating ==
- European Championships held at Hamar, Norway
  - Men's all-round: Enrico Fabris (Italy) with 151.523 points
  - Ladies' all-round: Claudia Pechstein (Germany) with 163.159 points
- World Sprint Championships held at Heerenveen, Netherlands
  - Men: Joey Cheek (USA) with 139.990 points
  - Ladies: Svetlana Zhurova (Russia) with 153.625 points
- World Allround Championships held at Calgary, Alberta, Canada
  - Men: Shani Davis (USA) with 145.742 points
  - Ladies: Cindy Klassen (Canada) with 154.580 points

== Swimming ==
- 8th World Short Course Championships held in Shanghai
  - Australia wins the most medals (24) and the most gold medals (12)
- 28th European LC Championships held in Budapest
  - Italy and France win the most medals (15); Russia the most gold medals (7)
- August 12 – Roland Schoeman breaks the short course world record in the men's 50m freestyle (short course) at Hamburg with a time of 20:98 seconds.
- August 28 – at Hobart, Tasmania, Australian swimmer Libby Lenton betters Natalie Coughlin's world record in the women's 100m butterfly (short course) from 56:39 to 55:95

== Tennis ==
- Australian Open
  - Men's Final: Roger Federer (Switzerland) defeats Marcos Baghdatis (Cyprus)
  - Women's Final: Amélie Mauresmo (France) defeats Justine Henin-Hardenne (Belgium)
- French Open
  - Men's Final: Rafael Nadal (Spain) defeats Roger Federer (Switzerland)
  - Women's Final: Justine Henin-Hardenne (Belgium) defeats Svetlana Kuznetsova (Russia)
- Wimbledon Championships
  - Men's Final: Roger Federer (Switzerland) defeats Rafael Nadal (Spain)
  - Women's Final: Amélie Mauresmo (France) defeats Justine Henin-Hardenne (Belgium)
- US Open
  - Men's Final: Roger Federer (Switzerland) defeats Andy Roddick (USA)
  - Women's Final: Maria Sharapova (Russia) defeats Justine Henin-Hardenne (Belgium)

== Triathlon ==
- ITU World Championships held in Lausanne, Switzerland

== Volleyball ==
- Men's World League: Brazil
- 2006 Men's European Volleyball League: Netherlands
- 2006 FIVB Men's World Championship: Brazil
- Women's World Grand Prix: Brazil
- 2006 FIVB Women's World Championship: Russia

== Water polo ==
- 2006 FINA Men's Water Polo World Cup: Serbia
- 2006 FINA Men's Water Polo World League: Serbia
- 2006 Men's European Water Polo Championship: Serbia
- 2006 Women's European Water Polo Championship: Russia
- 2006 FINA Women's Water Polo World League: USA

== Weightlifting ==
- 2006 World Weightlifting Championships in Santo Domingo, Dominican Republic

== World University Championships ==
- 2006 World University Championships

== Multi-sport events ==
- Central American and Caribbean Games held in Cartagena de Indias, Colombia
- 2006 Lusophony Games held in Macau, People's Republic of China.
- 2006 Commonwealth Games held in Melbourne, Australia
- 2006 Asian Games held in Doha, Qatar
- 2006 Winter Olympics in Turin, Italy from February 10, 2006, through February 26, 2006.
- 2006 Gay Games held in Chicago, United States from July 15 to July 22, 2006.

== Awards ==
- Associated Press Male Athlete of the Year – Tiger Woods, PGA golf
- Associated Press Female Athlete of the Year – Lorena Ochoa, LPGA golf
