= Imagine (horse) =

Irish-bred Thoroughbred racehorse

- Racing colours of Susan Magnier
- Sire: Sadler's Wells
- Grandsire: Northern Dancer
- Dam: Doff the Derby
- Damsire: Master Derby
- Sex: Mare
- Foaled: 20 February 1998
- Country: Ireland
- Colour: Bay
- Breeder: Barronstown Stud and Orpendale
- Owner: Susan Magnier & Diane Nagle
- Trainer: Aidan O'Brien
- Record: 10: 4-2-2
- Earnings: £382,032

Major wins
- C. L. Weld Park Stakes (2000); Irish 1000 Guineas (2001); Epsom Oaks (2001)

Honours
- Timeform rating 119

Imagine (foaled 20 February 1998) was an Irish Thoroughbred racehorse and broodmare best known for winning the Irish 1000 Guineas and The Oaks in 2001. In a racing career which lasted from August 2000 to June 2001 the filly ran ten times and won four races. As a two-year-old, Imagine ran six times, winning the Group Three C. L. Weld Park Stakes at the Curragh and finishing second in the Group Two Rockfel Stakes at Newmarket. The following spring, the filly was beaten in her first two races before winning the Irish 1000 Guineas at the Curragh. Imagine recorded her most valuable success on her final appearance, winning the Classic Oaks over one and a half miles at Epsom. She never raced again, but proved to be a successful broodmare.

== Background ==
Imagine is a dark-coated bay mare sired by the thirteen time Champion sire Sadler's Wells. She was the last foal of her dam, the American bred mare Doff the Derby, who had become famous a decade earlier as the dam of The Derby winner Generous. Doff the Derby was a half-sister of the leading racemare Trillion, who in turn produced the multiple Group One winner Triptych. Imagine was bred by a partnership between Barronstown Stud, who owned Doff the Derby, and Orpendale, a breeding company associated with the Coolmore organisation. Like many Coolmore horses, Imagine was trained by Aidan O'Brien at Ballydoyle. The filly usually raced in the colours of Susan Magnier, the wife of John Magnier although she was partly owned by Diane Nagle one of the owners of Barronstown.

== Racing career ==
=== 2000: two-year-old season ===
Imagine initially bypassed maiden races, making her first appearance in the Listed Debutante Stakes at the Curragh in August 2000 and finishing third behind the more experienced fillies Affianced and Sequoyah. She was then moved up to Group One level for the Moyglare Stud Stakes over the same course two weeks later. Ridden by the British veteran George Duffield, she finished sixth of the ten runners behind Sequoyah. Eleven days later Imagine was dropped in class for maiden race at Gowran Park and recorded her first win, ridden for the first time by Mick Kinane. Nine days late, Imagine was sent to England to contest the Group One Fillies' Mile at Ascot. She led for most of the way, but weakened in the closing stages and finished fourth to Crystal Music. On 30 September, Imagine, running for the fifth time in forty-one days contested the Group Three C. L. Weld Park Stakes at the Curragh. Starting the 5/2 favourite against eleven other fillies, she led from the start and held the late challenge of Katherine Seymour to win by half a length. Imagine's final appearance of 2000 came in the Group Two Rockfel Stakes at Newmarket in October. In a close and rough finish, Imagine overcame interference to finish third, beaten a short head and half a length by Sayedah and Katherine Seymour, but was promoted to second place when the runner-up was disqualified after a steward's inquiry.

=== 2001: three-year-old season ===
Imagine reappeared as a three-year-old in the Leopardstown 1,000 Guineas Trial Stakes in April. She started the 9/10 favourite but was beaten five and a half lengths by the easy winner Rebelline. On 7 May, Imagine was made favourite for the Listed Athasi Stakes but finished third behind Cool Clarity and Rose Gypsy. The field for the Irish 1000 Guineas at the Curragh included Rebelline, Cool Clarity, Sequoyah, Katherine Seymour and Crystal Music, who started favourite, while Imagine was not fancied and started a 16/1 outsider. Ridden by Seamie Heffernan, Imagine was restrained in the early stages before moving up to fourth place a quarter of a mile from the finish. Imagine took the lead just inside the final furlong and ran on strongly to win by two lengths from Crystal Music. Imagine's win, which came one day after O'Brien had trained the first three horses in the Irish 2000 Guineas, enabled Sadler's Wells to equal the record of 45 individual Group One/Grade I set by Sir Tristram.

Twelve days after her win in the Irish classic, Imagine started 3/1 favourite against thirteen opponents in the Epsom Oaks. O'Brien had not been able to run his horses in Britain earlier in the season because of restrictions on the movement of livestock imposed as a result of the 2001 United Kingdom foot-and-mouth outbreak. Ridden by Kinane, Imagine was restrained at the back of the field in the early stages and seemed to be struggling just after halfway as she seemed unable to handle the downhill section of the course. She turned into the straight in eighth place but then made steady progress down the centre of the course to challenge the leader Relish the Thought inside the last quarter mile. Imagine overtook Relish the Thought 150 yards from the finish and won by one and a quarter lengths with the fast-finishing second favourite Flight of Fancy (owned by the Queen) taking second place in the last strides. The first three were all daughters of Sadler's Wells. After the race O'Brien said that Imagine was "an amazing filly to win like that when it was ground she didn't like."

Shortly after the Oaks, Imagine sustained an injury (described by O'Brien as a "stone bruise") which interrupted her training. During her break she gained a great deal of weight and it proved impossible to bring her back to peak fitness for a run in the Prix de l'Arc de Triomphe. In September it was announced that she would be retired from racing.

== Assessment and honours ==
In the 2001 International Classification (the forerunner of the World Thoroughbred Racehorse Rankings), Imagine was given a rating of 117, making her the equal tenth best three-year-old filly in the world (and the third best in Europe), six pounds below the top-rated Banks Hill.

The independent Timeform organisation gave Imagine a rating of 119.

== Stud record ==
Imagine was retired to become a broodmare for the Coolmore Stud, and proved highly successful. Her first foal was Horatio Nelson, by Danehill who won the Prix Jean-Luc Lagardère and was fatally injured when second favourite for the 2006 Epsom Derby. She went on to produce the Group Two winners Viscount Nelson and Kitty Matcham as well as Red Rock Canyon, who won only one minor race but acted as pacemaker for the Ballydoyle champions Dylan Thomas and Duke of Marmalade.

- 2003 Horatio Nelson (IRE) : Bay colt, foaled 30 April, by Danehill (USA) – won 4 races including G1 Grand Critérium Prix Jean-Luc Lagardère, Longchamp; G2 Futurity Stakes, Curragh; G3 Superlative Stakes, Newmarket; 2nd G1 Dewhurst Stakes, Newmarket from 7 starts in Ireland and England 2005-6
- 2004 Red Rock Canyon (IRE) : Bay colt, foaled 8 May, by Rock of Gibraltar (IRE) – winner and 2nd G3 Meld Stakes, Leopardstown; 3rd G1 Irish Champion Stakes, Leopardstown; G1 Tattersalls Gold Cup, Curragh; 3rd G2 Royal Whip Stakes, Curragh; 3rd G3 International Stakes, Curragh; 4th G1 King George VI & Queen Elizabeth Stakes, Ascot in Ireland, England, U.S.A. and Dubai 2006–10
- 2005 Kitty Matcham (IRE) : Bay filly, foaled 21 May, by Rock of Gibraltar (IRE) – won 2 races including G2 Rockfel Stakes, Newmarket from 10 starts in Ireland and England 2007-8
- 2007 Viscount Nelson (USA) : Bay colt, foaled 6 February, by Giant's Causeway (USA) – won 4 races including G2 Al Fahidi Fort, Meydan; LR Hurricane Run Stakes, Tipperary; LR Silver Stakes, Curragh; 2nd G2 Champagne Stakes, Doncaster; 2nd G2 Godolphin Mile, Meydan; 3rd G1 Irish 2000 Guineas, Curragh; 3rd G1 Eclipse Stakes, Sandown from 20 starts in Ireland, England, France, U.S.A. and Dubai 2009–12
- 2008 Guessing (USA) : Bay filly, foaled 27 February, by Kingmambo (USA) – unplaced in Ireland and New Zealand 2011–12
- 2010 Point Piper (USA) : Bay colt, foaled 16 March, by Giant's Causeway (USA) – won and placed twice from 5 starts in Ireland 2012–13; won 2 races including G3 Longacres Mile H, Emerald Downs and placed 6 times including 3rd G2 Oaklawn H, Oaklawn Park; G3 Mineshaft H, Fairgrounds from 12 starts to date (4/11/16) in the U.S.A. 2015–16.
- 2011 Adeste Fideles (USA) : Bay filly, foaled 14 March, by Giant's Causeway (USA) – won one race and placed three times from seven starts in Ireland 2013–14
- 2013 General Macarthur (USA) : Bay colt, foaled 19 March, by War Front (USA) – won twice and placed 2nd once and 4th twice, including G3 Meld S, Leopardstown from 11 starts to date (4/11/16) in Ireland 2015–16
- 2018 Van Gogh (USA) : Bay colt, foaled 11 February, by American Pharoah (USA) - has won twice and placed 2nd twice, including G1 Critérium International

== Pedigree ==
Pedigree of Imagine (IRE), bay mare, 1998
Sire Sadler's Wells (USA) 1981	Northern Dancer; 1961	Nearctic	Nearco
Sire Sadler's Wells (USA) 1981	Northern Dancer; 1961	Nearctic	Lady Angela
Sire Sadler's Wells (USA) 1981	Northern Dancer; 1961	Natalma	Native Dancer
Sire Sadler's Wells (USA) 1981	Northern Dancer; 1961	Natalma	Almahmoud
Sire Sadler's Wells (USA) 1981	Fairy Bridge; 1975	Bold Reason	Hail to Reason
Sire Sadler's Wells (USA) 1981	Fairy Bridge; 1975	Bold Reason	Lalun
Sire Sadler's Wells (USA) 1981	Fairy Bridge; 1975	Special	Forli
Sire Sadler's Wells (USA) 1981	Fairy Bridge; 1975	Special	Thong
Dam Doff the Derby (USA) 1981	Master Derby; 1972	Dust Commander	Bold Commander
Dam Doff the Derby (USA) 1981	Master Derby; 1972	Dust Commander	Dust Storm
Dam Doff the Derby (USA) 1981	Master Derby; 1972	Madam Jerry	Royal Coinage
Dam Doff the Derby (USA) 1981	Master Derby; 1972	Madam Jerry	Our Kretchen
Dam Doff the Derby (USA) 1981	Margarethen; 1962	Tulyar	Tehran
Dam Doff the Derby (USA) 1981	Margarethen; 1962	Tulyar	Neocracy
Dam Doff the Derby (USA) 1981	Margarethen; 1962	Russ-Marie	Nasrullah
Dam Doff the Derby (USA) 1981	Margarethen; 1962	Russ-Marie	Marguery (Family:4-n)
