= Scorpion (horse) =

Irish-bred Thoroughbred racehorse

- Sire: Montjeu
- Grandsire: Sadler's Wells
- Dam: Ardmelody
- Damsire: Law Society
- Sex: Stallion
- Foaled: 2002
- Country: Ireland
- Colour: Bay
- Breeder: Grangemore Stud
- Owner: Sue Magnier & Michael Tabor
- Trainer: Aidan O'Brien
- Record: 15: 4-6-0
- Earnings: £958,059

Major wins
- Grand Prix de Paris (2005); St. Leger Stakes (2005); Coronation Cup (2007)
- Last updated on September 28, 2009

Scorpion (foaled February 5, 2002) is an Irish Thoroughbred racehorse and sire. As a three-year-old in 2005 he won the Grand Prix de Paris (in record time) and the St. Leger Stakes. In 2007 he won the Coronation Cup.

== Background ==
Scorpion is a bay horse with a white star and white socks on his hind feet bred in Ireland by the County Kildare-based Grangemore Stud. He is one of many top-class horses sired by Montjeu. Others include the Derby winners Motivator, Authorized, Pour Moi and Camelot, the St Leger winners Leading Light and Masked Marvel, and the Prix de l'Arc de Triomphe winner Hurricane Run. Scorpion's dam Ardmelody, was an unraced daughter of the Irish Derby winner Law Society. Ardmelody's dam, Thistlewood, was a half-sister to both the outstanding stayer Ardross and the Prix de Flore winner Gesedeh, the grand-dam of Electrocutionist.

In September 2003, the yearling was sent to the Goffs sale where he was bought for €260,000 by the bloodstock agent Dermot "Demi" O'Byrne on behalf of the Coolmore organisation. Like many of the Coolmore horses, the details of Scorpion's ownership changed from race to race. He sometimes raced in the colours of Sue Magnier and sometimes as the property of a partnership of Magnier and Michael Tabor. He was trained at Ballydoyle by Aidan O'Brien.

== Racing career ==
=== 2005: three-year-old season ===
Scorpion did not race as a two-year-old, but made his debut in a ten-furlong maiden race at Leopardstown on 8 May 2005. Ridden by Kieren Fallon he started the 4/5 favourite and won by half a length from Magnolia Lane, with a gap of ten lengths back to the third placed horse. Two weeks later he was moved up in class for the Group Three Gallinule Stakes at the Curragh Racecourse. He again started the odds-on favourite but failed by a short head to catch Im Spartacus, with the British-trained Mister Genepi another short head away in third.

Despite his defeat at the Curragh, the colt was again stepped up in class for the Group One Prix du Jockey Club at Chantilly Racecourse on 5 June. After restraining the colt in the early stages Fallon attempted to make a forward move in the straight but Scorpion made no progress and finished sixteenth of the seventeen runners behind Shamardal, who defeated the favourite Hurricane Run by a neck. Scorpion was moved up in distance three weeks later and started a 25/1 outsider for the Irish Derby over one and a half miles at the Curragh. Ridden by Colm O'Donoghue he took the lead in the straight and kept on well after being overtaken by Hurricane Run to finish second, half a length behind the winner. Scorpion returned to France for the Grand Prix de Paris over 2400 metres at Longchamp Racecourse on 14 July. Reunited with Fallon, he started the 6/4 favourite against eight opponent headed by the Prix du Lys winner Desideratum. After racing just behind the leaders he took the lead in the straight and drew away in the last 200 metres to win by two and a half lengths from Desideratum.

After a break of almost two months, Scorpion returned to the racecourse to start 10/11 favourite for the 229th running of the St Leger over fourteen and half furlongs at Doncaster Racecourse on 10 September. He faced only five opponents, with his most serious opposition appearing likely to come from Hard Top and The Geezer, first and second in the Great Voltigeur Stakes. Ridden by Frankie Dettori, he took the lead from the start and was never seriously challenged, going clear in the straight and winning by two lengths from The Geezer, with Tawqeet five lengths back in third. On his final appearance of the season he was ridden by Mick Kinane in the Prix de l'Arc de Triomphe at Longchamp on 2 October. He was among the early leaders and held fourth place early in the straight but weakened in the closing stages and finished tenth of the fifteen runners, thirteen and a half lengths behind the winner Hurricane Run.

=== 2006: four-year-old season ===
Training problems kept Scorpion off the racecourse before he returned in the Listed Finale Stakes at the Curragh on 8 October. He started favourite but was beaten a length by the British-trained five-year-old Frank Sonata. In his two remaining races Scorpion competed in major international races but made little impact. He finished fifth behind Red Rocks in the Breeders' Cup Turf at Churchill Downs in November and seventh behind Collier Hill in the Hong Kong Vase at Sha Tin Racecourse in December.

=== 2007: five-year-old season ===
Scorpion began his third campaign in the Ormonde Stakes at Chester Racecourse on 11 May in which he was ridden by Kinane. He started favourite but appeared very nervous before the race and was beaten two lengths into second place by the Michael Stoute-trained four-year-old Ask. Three weeks later, the horse contested the Group One Coronation Cup over one and a half miles at Epsom Downs Racecourse. He started the 8/1 fifth choice in the betting behind the 2006 St Leger winner Sixties Icon, the Mooresbridge Stakes winner Septimus (also trained by Aidan O'Brien), the 2006 Epsom Derby winner Sir Percy and Maraahel, twice winner of the Huxley Stakes. Scorpion moved into second place behind Septimus at half way, before overtaking his better fancied stable companion two furlongs from the finish. He stayed on strongly in the closing stages to win by one and a quarter lengths and half a length from Septimus and Maraahel. Scorpion started 4/5 favourite for the Hardwicke Stakes at Royal Ascot on 23 June but was beaten half a length by Maraahel, to whom he was conceding five pounds. On 28 July, Scorpion started 3/1 second favourite (behind his stable companion Dylan Thomas) for Britain's most prestigious weight-for-age race, the King George VI and Queen Elizabeth Stakes over one and a half miles at Ascot. He took the lead soon after the start and maintained his advantage into the straight but weakened in the closing stages to finish fifth of the seven runners behind Dylan Thomas.

On his final racecourse appearance, Scorpion was matched against another stable companion, the double Ascot Gold Cup winner Yeats in the Irish St. Leger over one and three quarter miles at the Curragh on 15 September. Scorpion was ridden by Seamie Heffernan and started at odds of 7/2, whilst Yeats, ridden by Fallon, was the 4/7 favourite. Scorpion went to the front from the start and held the lead until well inside the final furlong when he was caught and beaten half a length by Yeats.

== Stud record ==
Scorpion was retired from racing to become a breeding stallion for the Coolmore Stud National Hunt breeding arm. He stood at the Castle Hyde Stud in County Cork and was marketed as a National Hunt stallion. The best of his progeny have included the King George VI Chase winner Might Bight, the American Champion Steeplechase Horse Scorpiancer and Don't Touch It (Herald Champion Novice Hurdle).

== Pedigree ==
Pedigree of Scorpion (IRE), dark bay or brown stallion, 2002
Sire Montjeu (IRE) 1996	Sadler's Wells (USA); 1981	Northern Dancer	Nearctic
Sire Montjeu (IRE) 1996	Sadler's Wells (USA); 1981	Northern Dancer	Natalma
Sire Montjeu (IRE) 1996	Sadler's Wells (USA); 1981	Fairy Bridge	Bold Reason
Sire Montjeu (IRE) 1996	Sadler's Wells (USA); 1981	Fairy Bridge	Special
Sire Montjeu (IRE) 1996	Floripedes (FR); 1985	Top Ville	High Top
Sire Montjeu (IRE) 1996	Floripedes (FR); 1985	Top Ville	Sega Ville
Sire Montjeu (IRE) 1996	Floripedes (FR); 1985	Toute Cy	Tennyson
Sire Montjeu (IRE) 1996	Floripedes (FR); 1985	Toute Cy	Adele Toumignon
Dam Ardmelody (IRE) 1987	Law Society (USA); 1982	Alleged	Hoist The Flag
Dam Ardmelody (IRE) 1987	Law Society (USA); 1982	Alleged	Princess Pout
Dam Ardmelody (IRE) 1987	Law Society (USA); 1982	Bold Bikini	Boldnesian
Dam Ardmelody (IRE) 1987	Law Society (USA); 1982	Bold Bikini	Ran-Tan
Dam Ardmelody (IRE) 1987	Thistlewood (IRE); 1979	Kalamoun	Zeddaan
Dam Ardmelody (IRE) 1987	Thistlewood (IRE); 1979	Kalamoun	Khairunissa
Dam Ardmelody (IRE) 1987	Thistlewood (IRE); 1979	Le Melody	Levmoss
Dam Ardmelody (IRE) 1987	Thistlewood (IRE); 1979	Le Melody	Arctic Melody (Family: 23)
