= Van Gogh (horse) =

American-bred Thoroughbred racehorse

- Racing silks of Michael Tabor
- Sire: American Pharoah
- Grandsire: Pioneerof the Nile
- Dam: Imagine
- Damsire: Sadler's Wells
- Sex: Colt
- Foaled: 11 February 2018
- Country: United States
- Colour: Bay
- Breeder: Barronstown Stud
- Owner: Michael Tabor, Derrick Smith, Susan Magnier & Diana Nagle
- Trainer: Aidan O'Brien
- Record: 7: 2-3-0
- Earnings: £120,533

Major wins
- Critérium International (2020)

Awards
- Cartier Champion Two-year-old Colt (2020)

Van Gogh (foaled 11 February 2018) is an American-bred, Irish-trained Thoroughbred racehorse. He was named the Champion Two-year-old Colt of Europe in 2020 when he won two of his seven races including the Group 1 Critérium International as well as finishing second in the Tyros Stakes, Juvenile Stakes and Autumn Stakes.

== Background ==
Van Gogh is an "imposing" bay colt with no white markings bred in Kentucky by the County Wicklow-based Barronstown Stud. He initially raced for the Coolmore Stud partners Michael Tabor, Derrick Smith and Susan Magnier in association with Barronstown's Diane Nagle. The colt was sent into training with Aidan O'Brien at Ballydoyle.

He was from the second crop of foals sired by American Pharoah won the American Triple Crown and the Breeders' Cup Classic in 2015. Van Gogh's dam Imagine was an outstanding racemare who won the Irish 1,000 Guineas and the Epsom Oaks in 2001. As a broodmare, her other foals included Horatio Nelson and Viscount Nelson (Al Fahidi Fort). Imagine was the last foal of her dam Doff the Derby, who had previously produced Generous and was closely related to Trillion, Triptych and Treve.

== Racing career ==
=== 2020: two-year-old season ===
The 2020 flat racing season in Europe was disrupted by the COVID-19 pandemic, which saw many of the early meetings abandoned before racing resumed under tight restrictions. Van Gogh made his racecourse debut in a maiden race over seven furlongs at Leopardstown Racecourse on 11 July when he led until the closing stages before finishing fourth behind the odds-on favourite Masen, beaten one and a quarter lengths by the winner. Despite his defeat the colt was stepped up in class to contest the Group 3 Tyros Stakes over the same course and distance eighteen days later and ran second behind his stablemate Military Style, with Masen in third place. On 22 August at the Curragh he started 7/2 second favourite for the Group 2 Futurity Stakes but ran poorly and came home sixth of the eight runners behind Mac Swiney. In the Group 2 Juvenile Stakes over one mile at Leopardstown he led for most of the way before being overtaken inside the final furlong and finishing second to the Jessica Harrington-trained Cadillac. For his next start Van Gogh was dropped back in class and started the 4/7 favourite for a maiden over seven furlongs at the Curragh on 27 September. Ridden by Seamie Heffernan he took the lead soon after the start and repelled a sustained challenge from Colour Sergeant to win by half a length.

On 10 October Van Gogh was sent to England to contest the Group 3 Autumn Stakes over the Rowley Mile course at Newmarket Racecourse and went off the 9/2 joint-favourite in a ten-runner field. After starting slowly and racing towards the rear of the field for most of the way he produced a strong finish to take second place, one and three quarter lengths behind the winner One Ruler. Two weeks after his run at Newmarket the colt was sent to France for the Group 1 Critérium International over 1600 metres on heavy ground at Saint-Cloud Racecourse. Ridden by Pierre-Charles Boudot he was made the 3.6/1 third choice in the betting behind the British-trained challengers Jadoomi and La Barrosa (winner of the Somerville Tattersall Stakes) in a six-runner field which also included Normandy Bridge (Prix Thomas Bryon), Policy of Truth (Prix des Chênes) and Darkness (Listed Criterium de Lyon). Van Gogh raced towards the rear in the early stages but went to the front 300 metres from the finish to win "comfortably" by four lengths from Normandy Bridge. Boudot commented "He is impressive. Aidan told me before the race that he needed cover, for a nice trip and be relaxed – and he has a nice turn of foot. But he is still green and tricky when he arrived in front – but he won in very good style".

On 19 November Van Gogh was named Champion Two-year-old Colt at the Cartier Racing Awards. In the official European classification of for 2020 Van Gogh was given a rating of 114, making him the ninth best two-year-old of the season six pounds behind the top-rated St Mark's Basilica.

== Pedigree ==
Pedigree of Van Gogh (IRE), bay colt 2018
Sire American Pharoah (USA) 2012	Pioneerof The Nile (USA); 2006	Empire Maker	Unbridled
Sire American Pharoah (USA) 2012	Pioneerof The Nile (USA); 2006	Empire Maker	Toussaud
Sire American Pharoah (USA) 2012	Pioneerof The Nile (USA); 2006	Star of Goshen	Lord At War (ARG)
Sire American Pharoah (USA) 2012	Pioneerof The Nile (USA); 2006	Star of Goshen	Castle Eight
Sire American Pharoah (USA) 2012	Littleprincessemma (USA); 2006	Yankee Gentleman	Storm Cat
Sire American Pharoah (USA) 2012	Littleprincessemma (USA); 2006	Yankee Gentleman	Key Phrase
Sire American Pharoah (USA) 2012	Littleprincessemma (USA); 2006	Exclusive Rosette	Ecliptical
Sire American Pharoah (USA) 2012	Littleprincessemma (USA); 2006	Exclusive Rosette	Zetta Jet
Dam Imagine (IRE) 1998	Sadler's Wells (USA); 1981	Northern Dancer (CAN)	Nearctic
Dam Imagine (IRE) 1998	Sadler's Wells (USA); 1981	Northern Dancer (CAN)	Natalma (USA)
Dam Imagine (IRE) 1998	Sadler's Wells (USA); 1981	Fairy Bridge	Bold Reason
Dam Imagine (IRE) 1998	Sadler's Wells (USA); 1981	Fairy Bridge	Special
Dam Imagine (IRE) 1998	Doff The Derby (USA); 1981	Master Derby	Dust Commander
Dam Imagine (IRE) 1998	Doff The Derby (USA); 1981	Master Derby	Madam Jerry
Dam Imagine (IRE) 1998	Doff The Derby (USA); 1981	Margarethen	Tulyar (IRE)
Dam Imagine (IRE) 1998	Doff The Derby (USA); 1981	Margarethen	Russ-Marie (Family: 4-n)
