= Pat Dobbs =

Irish jockey

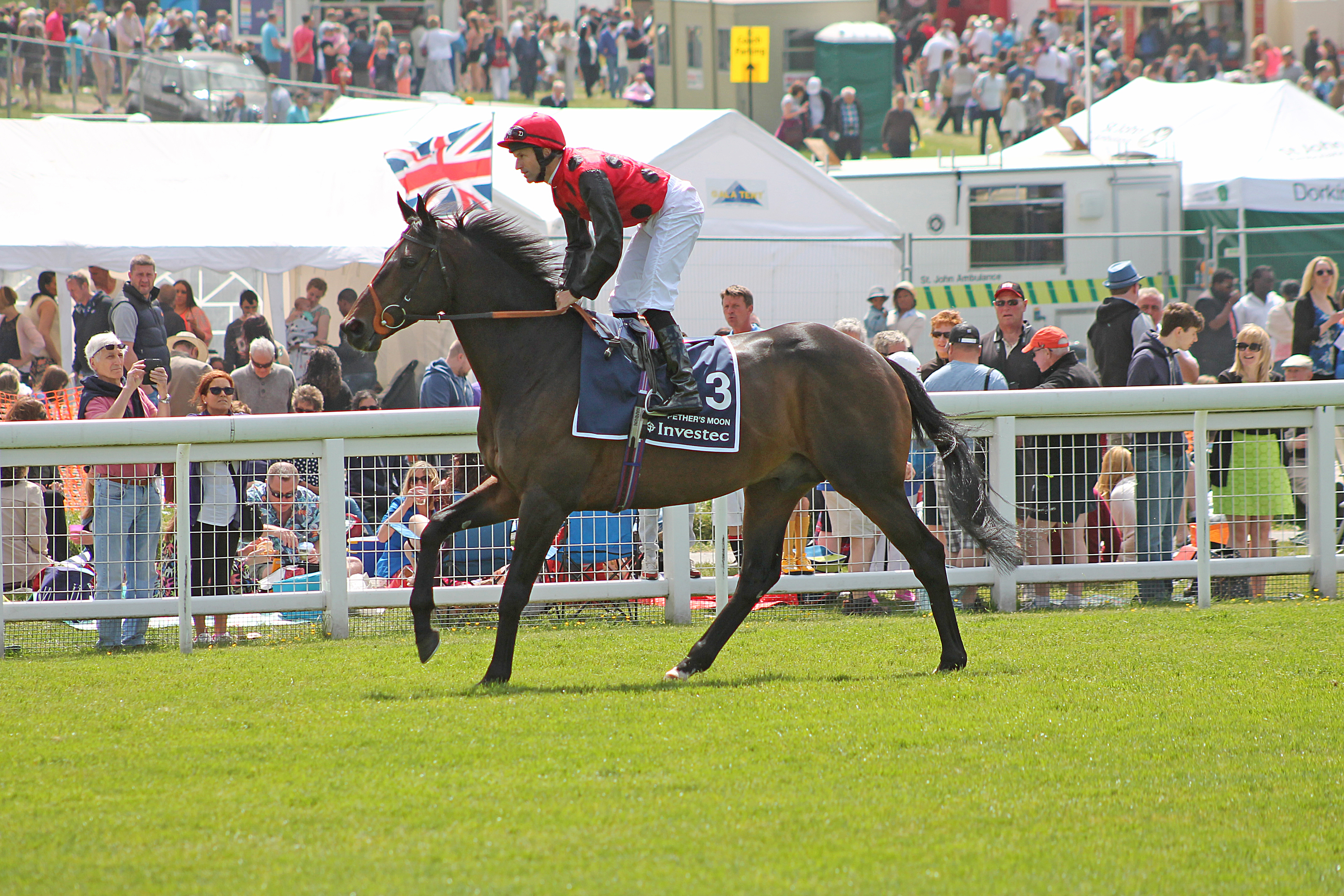
- Dobbs going to post on Coronation Cup winner Pethers Moon

Personal information
- Born: 6 February 1978 (age 48) Enniscorthy, County Wexford, Ireland
- Occupation: Jockey

Horse racing career
- Sport: Horse racing

Major racing wins
- Coronation Cup (2015); Al Maktoum Challenge

Significant horses
- Pether's Moon

Pat Dobbs (born 1978) is a Group 1 winning Irish jockey. He is stable jockey for Richard Hannon Jr.

== Career ==
Dobbs was born and brought up in a non-racing family in County Wexford, Ireland. He found racing an enjoyable alternative to school and after entering the apprentices' school in Kildare at 15, he was placed with trainer Dessie Hughes, where he spent three years. Hughes had few flat horses, however, so, at the recommendation of Dessie's son, Richard Hughes, Dobbs got a job with Richard Hannon Sr. in England. He rode for Richard Sr until the older man's retirement and has continued to ride for his son, Richard Jr since.

Throughout his time with the Hannons, Dobbs was normally understudy to Hughes, who became the stable's first choice jockey. To start with, he had been allowed to keep the ride after winning on a horse, but once Hughes was established, “Richard always went to the best meetings and I would work around him.” Dobbs suffered a series of injuries early in his career, and being "painfully shy" didn't speak about his frustration.

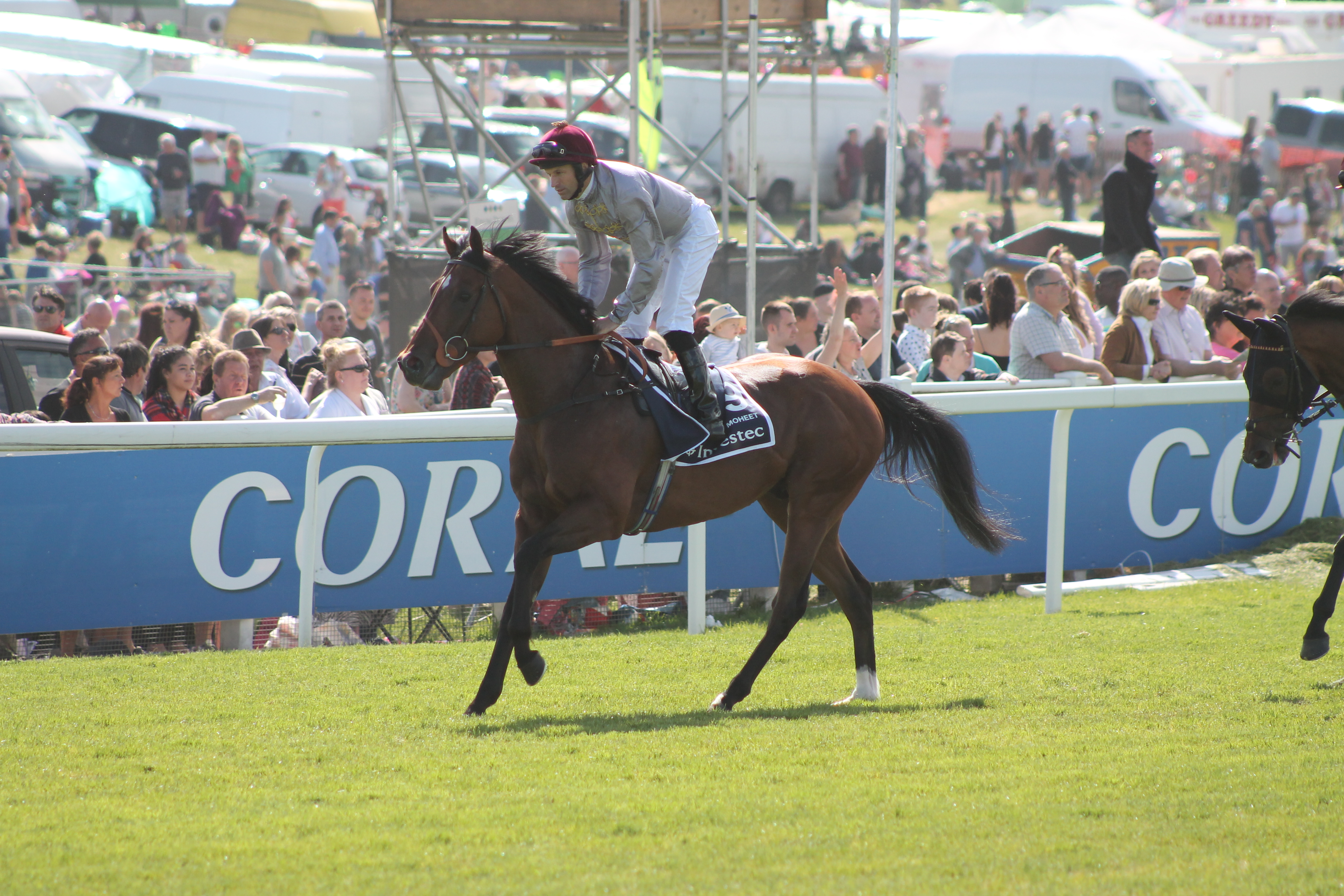
Pat Dobbs going to post on Moheet, his first Derby ride

Dobbs won some valuable sales races for Richard Sr, and also twice won the Sandown Mile on Hurricane Alan (2004 and 2005), but his biggest win during this time was the Wokingham Stakes at Royal Ascot in 2012 on David Marnane's Dandy Boy.

Richard Hannon Sr. retired in 2013, and once Richard Hughes retired in 2014, Dobbs had more opportunity on better horses. In 2015, he had his first Group 1 success on Pether's Moon in the Coronation Cup, besting French horses Dolniya and Flintshire in the final 100 yards. “It didn’t sink in until much later," he said. "At the time, I was just a bit surprised. It was only 50 yards from the line that I thought he’d win.” Later that day, he also got his first ride in the Derby on Moheet, finishing 10th. Both were Hannon horses. 2015 became his best season to date with 64 winners and, for the first time, over £1 million in prize money. At the time, he spoke of expecting to be able to ride for another ten years.

Since then, he has continued to ride for Richard Jr, winning the 2017 Earl of Sefton Stakes among other things, but owners at the stable have also used younger jockeys like Sean Levey and Cam Hardie. Dobbs has spent a number of winters in Dubai, where he is better known than in Britain, and has won several significant races for American trainer, Doug Watson.

His favourite horse is Hurricane Alan.

== Critical opinion ==
A commentator in The Times spoke of the "absence of expectation and entitlement" in Dobbs. "He is not a man who will stand out in a crowd, either by what he says or how he looks... but mention him around the racing community and there will be nods acknowledging a decent, dependable man, rather than strong opinions about personality or ability."

== Statistics ==
Flat wins in Great Britain by year

| Year | Wins | Runs | Strike rate | Total earnings |
|---|---|---|---|---|
| 1997 | 3 | 17 | 18 | £10,953 |
| 1998 | 11 | 95 | 12 | £48,578 |
| 1999 | 9 | 111 | 8 | £56,062 |
| 2000 | 16 | 155 | 10 | £89,872 |
| 2001 | 40 | 369 | 11 | £270,653 |
| 2002 | 21 | 247 | 9 | £164,556 |
| 2003 | 26 | 349 | 7 | £301,276 |
| 2004 | 19 | 353 | 5 | £283,495 |
| 2005 | 14 | 208 | 7 | £256,692 |
| 2006 | 18 | 253 | 7 | £135,594 |
| 2007 | 38 | 416 | 9 | £276,235 |
| 2008 | 30 | 347 | 9 | £429,349 |
| 2009 | 45 | 377 | 12 | £430,427 |
| 2010 | 49 | 425 | 12 | £352,379 |
| 2011 | 46 | 302 | 15 | £343,778 |
| 2012 | 51 | 377 | 14 | £734,502 |
| 2013 | 47 | 424 | 11 | £455,593 |
| 2014 | 44 | 358 | 12 | £509,331 |
| 2015 | 64 | 521 | 12 | £1,056,669 |
| 2016 | 35 | 402 | 9 | £623,432 |
| 2017 | 31 | 347 | 9 | £514,544 |
| 2018 | 18 | 166 | 11 | £247,506 |
| 2019 | 38 | 270 | 14 | £771,194 |
| 2020 | 26 | 248 | 10 | £306,581 |
| 2021 | 30 | 281 | 11 | £697,805 |
| 2022 | 35 | 266 | 13 | £1,001,477 |
| 2023 | 22 | 202 | 11 | £641,901 |

== Major wins ==
(United Kingdom) Great Britain

- Coronation Cup - (1) - Pether's Moon (2015)

United Arab Emirates

- Al Maktoum Challenge - (1) - Kabirkhan (2024)
