= Sir Percy =

British-bred Thoroughbred racehorse

- Racing colours of Anthony Pakenham
- Sire: Mark of Esteem
- Grandsire: Darshaan
- Dam: Percy's Lass
- Damsire: Blakeney
- Sex: Stallion
- Foaled: 27 January 2003
- Country: Great Britain
- Colour: Bay
- Breeder: The Old Suffolk Stud
- Owner: Anthony Pakenham
- Trainer: Marcus Tregoning
- Record: 10: 5-1-0
- Earnings: £1,145,291

Major wins
- Vintage Stakes (2005); Dewhurst Stakes (2005); Epsom Derby (2006)
- Last updated on 21 June 2007

Sir Percy (foaled 2003) is a British Thoroughbred race horse and sire. In a career which lasted from July 2005 to June 2007 he ran ten times and won five races. He was among the leading British two-year-olds of 2005, when his win included the Dewhurst Stakes. In the following year he recorded his most important success when winning The Derby. He was retired to stud after three unsuccessful starts in 2007.

== Background ==
Sir Percy was bred by Harry Ormesher at the Old Suffolk Stud in Hundon, Suffolk. His sire Mark of Esteem won the 1996 2,000 Guineas; his dam Percy's Lass won the Group 3 September Stakes in 1988 (and subsequently died of colic when Sir Percy was a foal. Sir Percy was the last of her offspring) and his damsire Blakeney won the Epsom Derby himself in 1969. Sir Percy was named after Sir Percy Blakeney, the hero of the novel The Scarlet Pimpernel. In November 2003 Sir Percy was sent as a weanling to the Tattersalls sales. He was bought for 20,000 guineas by Will Edmeades bloodstock, acting on behalf of Anthony Pakenham. Pakenham bought the colt as compensation for losing a National Hunt Horse.

Sir Percy was sent into training with Marcus Tregoning at Lambourn, Berkshire. He was ridden in all his races by Martin Dwyer.

== Racing career ==
=== 2005: two-year-old season ===
Sir Percy was undefeated as a two-year-old, winning all four of his races. He made his debut in a maiden race at Goodwood on 28 May. He started at odds of 8/1 and finished strongly to win by one and three quarter lengths. Four weeks late he started 7/4 favourite for a minor stakes race at Salisbury and won by one and a quarter lengths from Dont Dili Dali. On 27 July Sir Percy completed his hat trick and recorded his first Group race success when beating Cool Creek by a neck in the Vintage Stakes at Goodwood.

Sir Percy was then rested until returning in Britain's most prestigious two-year-old race, the Dewhurst Stakes, on 15 October. He was held up in the early stages before producing a powerful late run to take the lead inside the final furlong and win by a neck from the odds-onn favourite Horatio Nelson.

=== 2006: three-year-old season ===
Sir Percy made his seasonal debut in the 2000 Guineas on 6 May. He started 4/1 second favourite in a field of fourteen runners. He tracked the leaders for most of the way and stayed on strongly in the closing stages to finish second, beaten two and a half lengths by George Washington. Sir Percy sustained a pulled muscle in training after the Guineas and his participation in the Derby was in some doubt, with Tregoning considering the less demanding Prix du Jockey Club as an alternative target.

On 3 June he started 6/1 third favourite for the 2006 Epsom Derby. The French-trained colt Visindar was the 2/1 favourite, with Horatio Nelson the 11/2 second choice. Sir Percy was held up by Martin Dwyer in the early stages and was only eleventh as the field turned into the straight. In the final quarter mile Dwyer struggled to find room for a clear run until the last hundred yards when he sent the colt through a gap along the rails. Sir Percy accelerated to take the lead in the last strides and won in a four-way photo finish beating Dragon Dancer by a short head, with Dylan Thomas a head a way in third and Hala Bek a short head further back in fourth. The race was marred by the fatal injury sustained by Horatio Nelson in the straight. After the race Dwyer called Sir Percy an exceptional horse with a "tremendous turn of foot". Martin Dwyer's ride on Sir Percy at Epsom earned him the 2006 Lester Award for Flat Ride of the Year.

Sir Percy was troubled with a series of training problems which included a shoulder injury which ruled him out of a run in the Prix de l'Arc de Triomphe. On his only start after his Derby win he finished seventh of eight runners behind Pride in the Champion Stakes, when it was revealed he was still suffering the ill effects of an injury sustained in the Derby.

=== 2007: four-year-old season ===
Sir Percy remained in training for 2007 but failed to win in three starts. His first race of the season came in the Dubai Sheema Classic at Nad Al Sheba Racecourse on 31 March. He was struck into just after the field left the stalls but ran on to finish fourth to Vengeance of Rain. For his next race on 1 June he returned to Epsom to contest the Coronation Cup, finishing sixth of the seven runners behind Scorpion. On his final racecourse appearance Sir Percy was last of the six runners behind Manduro in the 2007 Prince of Wales's Stakes at Ascot Racecourse. He made much of the running in the race but was outpaced near the finish.

== Assessment and honors ==
Sir Percy, retired with five wins from 10 races and earnings of $2,150,350. He was a Cartier Award nominee at 2 and 3. In the 2005 International Classification for two-year-olds he was assessed on 121 making him the top-ranked colt in Britain and the second highest ranked two-year-old in Europe, three pounds behind George Washington. In the 2006 World Thoroughbred Racehorse Rankings Sir Percy was given a rating of 121, making him the twentieth best racehorse in the world.

== Stud career ==
He was retired to stud at Kirsten Rausing's Lanwades Stud in Newmarket where he entered stud in 2008 for a fee of £8,000. He made a promising start to his stud career with his first crop of two-year-olds winning eleven races in 2011.

== Pedigree ==
Pedigree of Sir Percy
Sire Mark of Esteem	Darshaan	Shirley Heights	Mill Reef
Sire Mark of Esteem	Darshaan	Shirley Heights	Hardiemma
Sire Mark of Esteem	Darshaan	Delsy	Abdos
Sire Mark of Esteem	Darshaan	Delsy	Kelsy
Sire Mark of Esteem	Homage	Ajdal	Northern Dancer
Sire Mark of Esteem	Homage	Ajdal	Native Partner
Sire Mark of Esteem	Homage	Home Love	Vaguely Noble
Sire Mark of Esteem	Homage	Home Love	Homespun
Dam Percy's Lass	Blakeney	Hethersett	Hugh Lupus
Dam Percy's Lass	Blakeney	Hethersett	Bride Elect
Dam Percy's Lass	Blakeney	Windmill Girl	Hornbeam
Dam Percy's Lass	Blakeney	Windmill Girl	Chorus Beauty
Dam Percy's Lass	Laughing Girl	Sassafras	Sheshoon
Dam Percy's Lass	Laughing Girl	Sassafras	Ruta
Dam Percy's Lass	Laughing Girl	Violetta	Pinza
Dam Percy's Lass	Laughing Girl	Violetta	Urshalim
