= Poulpeasty =

Village in County Wexford, Ireland

Pollpeasty Poll Péiste
- Village
- Location in Ireland
- Coordinates: 52°26′56″N 6°48′29″W
- Country: Ireland
- Province: Leinster
- County: Wexford
- Time zone: UTC+0 (WET)
  - Summer (DST): UTC-1 (IST (WEST))
- Area code: 053

Poulpeasty, officially Pollpeasty (Irish: Poll Péiste, meaning 'hole of the Péist'), is a small village in the west of County Wexford, Ireland.

== History and development ==
The village and surrounding area were once part of the large estate of the Carew family in the nearby, but now ruined, Castleboro House.

Today, the village contains a primary school, a Roman Catholic church, and a small number of houses. The local Gaelic Athletic Association club is the Cloughbawn GAA Club.

== People ==
- Aidan O'Brien, racehorse trainer, was born and raised in Poulpeasty. He attended the local primary school St Joseph's Donard N.S.

== See also ==
- List of towns and villages in Ireland
