= Aidan O'Brien =

Private Horse trainer for Coolmore Stud

- O'Brien at the Critérium de Saint-Cloud (2023)

Personal information
- Born: 16 October 1969 (age 57) County Wexford, Ireland
- Occupation: Trainer

Horse racing career
- Sport: Horse racing

Honours
- British Champions Series Hall of Fame (2024)

Significant horses
- Istabraq, Giant's Causeway, Mozart, Imagine, Galileo, Johannesburg, Hawk Wing, Rock of Gibraltar, High Chaparral, Powerscourt, Oratorio, Yeats, Scorpion, George Washington, Alexandrova, Dylan Thomas, Peeping Fawn, Duke of Marmalade, Henrythenavigator, Mastercraftsman, Fame and Glory, Rip Van Winkle, Lillie Langtry, St Nicholas Abbey, Cape Blanco, Misty for Me, Roderic O'Connor, So You Think, Treasure Beach, Camelot, Ruler of the World, Australia, Gleneagles, Qualify, Minding, Found, Highland Reel, Churchill, Winter, Magical, Auguste Rodin, Paddington, City of Troy

Aidan Patrick O'Brien (born 16 October 1969 in County Wexford, Ireland) is an Irish horse racing trainer. Since 1996, he has been the private trainer at Ballydoyle Stables near Rosegreen in County Tipperary for John Magnier and his Coolmore Stud associates. He is widely acknowledged as one of the greatest horse racing trainers of all time.

== Early and private life ==
Aidan Patrick O'Brien was born on 16 October 1969 in County Wexford, Ireland, one of six children of Denis O'Brien (died 1 December 2008) and his wife Stella (née Doyle). Denis was a farmer and small-scale horse trainer in the townland of Killegney, near Poulpeasty, in County Wexford, where Aidan grew up.

Aidan O'Brien attended Donard National School, located less than a mile from his parents' home. He subsequently attended secondary school at Good Counsel College, New Ross, also located in County Wexford. O'Brien is a member of the Pioneer Total Abstinence Association, meaning that he does not drink alcohol.

O'Brien first started working professionally with horses at P.J. Finn's racing stables at the Curragh, County Kildare, and then with Jim Bolger at Coolcullen, County Carlow.

Aidan O'Brien is married to Anne-Marie (née Crowley). Anne-Marie's father, Joe Crowley trained horses at Piltown, County Kilkenny, where his tenure was interrupted in quick succession by his daughter Anne-Marie (Champion National Hunt Trainer during her brief time at the helm), his son-in-law Aidan O'Brien (who took over from his wife in 1993 but moved on to Ballydoyle in 1996) and then another daughter, Frances Crowley (who moved on to train on the Curragh for some years). Joe then renewed his own training licence for some years before retiring.

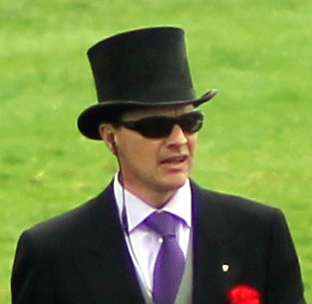
Aidan O'Brien at the 2012 Epsom Derby

Aidan O’Brien was champion Irish National Hunt trainer in the 1993/94 season and went on to lift the title for the next 5 consecutive seasons. His most successful horse during this time was the famed Istabraq. In 1996 he was approached by John Magnier to train at Ballydoyle. For a number of years he retained his Piltown yard.

O'Brien and Anne-Marie have four children, with Joseph, Sarah, Anastasia and Donnacha all became jockeys. Joseph and Donnacha also became trainers. Joseph became apprenticed to his father and rode his first winner shortly after his sixteenth birthday, on Johann Zoffany at Leopardstown on 28 May 2009. In 2012 O'Brien and Joseph, 19, became the first father-son/trainer-jockey combination to win The Derby, with Camelot. As of 2025, Aidan O'Brien is the most successful Epsom Derby trainer of all time with 11 wins.

== Successes ==
- 1996 Season

Desert King won the National Stakes to give Aidan O'Brien his first Group 1 success.

- 1997 Season

Desert King won the Irish 2,000 Guineas to give Aidan O'Brien his first classic success.

- 2001 Season

Aidan O'Brien was crowned England's champion trainer, the first Irishman to achieve the feat since Vincent O'Brien in 1971.

- 2004 Season

2004 Proved to be a disappointing year for O'Brien. It started off with the removal of Michael Kinane as stable jockey. Kinane was replaced by the young Jamie Spencer who had developed a good reputation riding in the UK. However the year ultimately proved disappointing on the track. Spencer was replaced after a string of self-confessed mistakes on Powerscourt in the Arlington Million and on the same horse again in the Breeders' Cup Turf.

- 2005 season

Kieren Fallon replaced Spencer as Ballydoyle's stable jockey. On the first classic weekend of the 2005 flat season the newly formed partnership of Aidan O'Brien and Kieren Fallon took home both the 2,000 Guineas (Footstepsinthesand) and the 1,000 Guineas (Virginia Waters). More major successes followed with Oratorio (Eclipse Stakes, Irish Champion Stakes), Scorpion (Grand Prix de Paris, St. Leger) and juveniles George Washington, Rumplestiltskin and Horatio Nelson.

- 2006 Season

The start of the 2006 flat season saw George Washington confirm his juvenile promise by easily winning the 2,000 Guineas on Newmarket's Rowley Mile to give O'Brien his fourth win in the race. While George Washington disappointed in the Irish equivalent, he redeemed himself in the Queen Elizabeth II Stakes at Ascot. Dylan Thomas also made his mark in the top middle distance races in Europe. After going close in the Epsom Derby, he was found to be more effective under a patient Kieren Fallon ride in the Irish Derby. Dylan Thomas also showed his battling qualities in the Irish Champion Stakes, where he beat the Champion mare Ouija Board by a neck. Other 2006 highlights came through Alexandrova who dominated the middle distance fillies classics taking in The Oaks, Irish Oaks and Yorkshire Oaks. The end of season saw the juvenile Holy Roman Emperor take the Prix Jean-Luc Lagardère on Arc day at Longchamp. In one of the races of the season he was beaten by a head in the Dewhurst Stakes by European Champion 2-year-old Teofilo. Much anticipation centred on the expected rematch of these two colts in the 2,000 Guineas at Newmarket the following spring. Aidan finished the season with prizemoney of over €6.5m in Ireland and Great Britain. The season was marked however by the emerging race fixing allegations involving stable jockey Kieren Fallon. On 3 July 2006, Fallon was charged along with 7 other people for conspiring to defraud clients of the internet betting exchange Betfair. Fallon was one of 28 people answering bail at Bishopsgate police station in the City of London in connection with the inquiry. In a released police statement, he was described as being charged with "offences relating to allegations of fixing the outcome of horse races between 1 December 2002 and 2 September 2004, and money laundering". He was among three jockeys charged, along with Darren Williams and Fergal Lynch, all of whom had their licences to ride in Britain suspended, effectively under the principle that they would be guilty until found innocent. Fallon's problems were further compounded when on 29 November 2006 the French racing authority France Galop suspended Fallon for six months after he tested positive for a metabolite of a banned substance.

- 2007 season

The end of the 2006 season had apparently left Ballydoyle with multiple options for the following year's classics. However the opening part of the season was left in turmoil after the premature retirement of Holy Roman Emperor. The previous year's champion miler George Washington proved almost infertile, ultimately siring only one foal. As a late replacement, Holy Roman Emperor was sent to Coolmore Stud. Plans had to be drastically changed with O'Brien saying "all our eggs were in one basket" in relation to the opening classic of the season the 2,000 Guineas. As a result, the season began relatively quietly as far as O'Brien's classic crop was concerned. However signs of changing fortunes would emerge on the day of the Poule d'Essai des Poulains when Astronomer Royal came with a late run to give Ballydoyle a 1–3–4 finish. Group 1 success was seen in the older horses through the previous year's Irish Derby winner Dylan Thomas when he won the Prix Ganay. The mid summer was highlighted by Scorpion winning the Coronation Cup in an O'Brien 1–2 with stable mate Septimus. The stable also dominated the St. James's Palace Stakes and the Irish Derby with Excellent Art and Soldier of Fortune respectively leading home 1–2–3 for O'Brien horses. O'Brien finished Royal Ascot as top trainer with four winners including Yeats who retained his Ascot Gold Cup and Henrythenavigator who set the juvenile standard for the early part of the season by winning the Coventry Stakes. Kieren Fallon returned to retainer duties in both Ireland and France, although his ban in Britain was still being enforced pending the result of his trial in relation to fraud in racing. Peeping Fawn managed to learn from her second place in The Oaks by taking the Audi Pretty Polly Stakes at the Curragh and eventually overturning form, albeit on softer ground, with Light Shift in the Irish Oaks. The season of 2007 also saw Aidan land the one big European race that had so far eluded him throughout his illustrious career when Dylan Thomas won the Prix de l'Arc de Triomphe under Kieren Fallon. The season however ended on a very sad note after George Washington was put down after breaking down in the Breeders Cup Classic.

- 2008 Season

During the off season Johnny Murtagh was appointed stable jockey after Kieren Fallon's acquittal on race-fixing charges was quickly followed by a second drugs suspension. However the introduction of Johnny Murtagh to Ballydoyle was to prove a baptism of fire and assisted Aidan in what was to be a vintage Ballydoyle year, equalling his previous best Group 1 tally of 23. As a team Aidan and Johnny were to dominate the Irish classic scene taking all five Irish Classic Races thus being the first trainer to do so since 1935. He again was named Champion trainer in Britain taking his second title in a row. He equalled former Ballydoyle resident Vincent O'Brien's record of 6 winners at Royal Ascot, four of these at the highest level including Yeats' record-equalling third consecutive Ascot Gold Cup. Henrythenavigator won both the Irish and English 2000 Guineas, and followed up with the St James's Palace Stakes. Duke of Marmalade won 5 times at group 1 level and was considered by many to be the Champion older male horse in Europe at middle distances. Other highlights through the year were provided by Halfway to Heaven, Frozen Fire, Mastercraftsman, Mount Nelson, Fame and Glory, Septimus and Moonstone.

- 2016 Season

O'Brien's horses won a record 7 races at Royal Ascot in 2016.

- 2017 season

O'Brien set a new world record by training 26 Group or Grade 1 winners in one calendar year when Saxon Warrior won the Racing Post Trophy at Doncaster, which beat the US-based Bobby Frankel's 2003 mark of 25. By the end of the year O'Brien extended the record to 28.

== Coolmore Stud ==
O'Brien is backed by the Coolmore operation. The Coolmore operation is renowned for high-priced yearling purchases at the Keeneland September Yearling Sales and elsewhere.

== Major wins ==
(Republic of Ireland) Ireland

- Irish 1,000 Guineas – (12) – Classic Park (1997), Imagine (2001), Yesterday (2003), Halfway to Heaven (2008), Misty for Me (2011), Marvellous (2014), Winter (2017), Hermosa (2019), Peaceful (2020), Empress Josephine (2021), Lake Victoria (2025), Precise (2026)
- Irish 2,000 Guineas – (13) – Desert King (1997), Saffron Walden (1999), Black Minnaloushe (2001), Rock of Gibraltar (2002), Henrythenavigator (2008), Mastercraftsman (2009), Roderic O'Connor (2011), Power (2012), Magician (2013), Gleneagles (2015), Churchill (2017), Paddington (2023), Gstaad (2026)
- Irish Champion Stakes – (13) – Giant's Causeway (2000), High Chaparral (2003), Oratorio (2005), Dylan Thomas (2006, 2007), Cape Blanco (2010), So You Think (2011), Magical (2019, 2020), St Mark's Basilica (2021), Luxembourg (2022), Auguste Rodin (2023), Delacroix (2025)
- Irish Derby – (18) – Desert King (1997), Galileo (2001), High Chaparral (2002), Dylan Thomas (2006), Soldier of Fortune (2007), Frozen Fire (2008), Fame and Glory (2009), Cape Blanco (2010), Treasure Beach (2011), Camelot (2012), Australia (2014), Capri (2017), Sovereign (2019), Santiago (2020), Auguste Rodin (2023), Los Angeles (2024), Lambourn (2025), Benvenuto Cellini (2026)
- Irish Oaks – (8) – Alexandrova (2006), Peeping Fawn (2007), Moonstone (2008), Bracelet (2014), Seventh Heaven (2016), Snowfall (2021), Savethelastdance (2023), Minnie Hauk (2025)
- Irish St. Leger – (8) – Yeats (2007), Septimus (2008), Order Of St George (2015, 2017), Flag of Honour (2018), Kyprios (2022, 2024), Scandinavia (2026)
- Matron Stakes – (3) – Lillie Langtry (2010), Alice Springs (2016), Hydrangea (2017)
- Moyglare Stud Stakes – (12) – Sequoyah (2000), Quarter Moon (2001), Necklace (2003), Rumplestiltskin (2005), Misty for Me (2010), Maybe (2011), Minding (2015), Happily (2017), Love (2019), Lake Victoria (2024), Precise (2025), Sun Goddess (2026)
- National Stakes – (12) – Desert King (1996), King of Kings (1997), Beckett (2000), Hawk Wing (2001), One Cool Cat (2003), George Washington (2005), Mastercraftsman (2008), Power (2011), Gleneagles (2014), Air Force Blue (2015), Churchill (2016), Henry Longfellow (2023)
- Phoenix Stakes – (18) – Lavery (1998), Fasliyev (1999), Minardi (2000), Johannesburg (2001), Spartacus (2002), One Cool Cat (2003), George Washington (2005), Holy Roman Emperor (2006), Mastercraftsman (2008), Alfred Nobel (2009), Zoffany (2010), Pedro the Great (2012), Dick Whittington (2014), Air Force Blue (2015), Caravaggio (2016), Sioux Nation (2017), Little Big Bear (2022), Sun Goddess (2026)
- Flying Five Stakes - (3) - Ishiguru (2001), Caravaggio (2017), Fairyland (2019)
- Golden Fleece Stakes - (1) - Darkness Falls (2026)
- Pretty Polly Stakes – (6) – Peeping Fawn (2007), Misty For Me (2011), Diamondsandrubies (2015), Minding (2016), Magical (2020), Whirl (2025)
- Tattersalls Gold Cup – (11) – Black Sam Bellamy (2003), Powerscourt (2004), Duke of Marmalade (2008), Fame and Glory (2010), So You Think (2011, 2012), Lancaster Bomber (2018), Magical (2019, 2020), Luxembourg (2023), Los Angeles (2025)
- Irish Champion Hurdle – (4) – Istabraq (1998, 1999, 2000, 2001)
- Punchestown Champion Hurdle – (1) – Istabraq (1999)
- December Festival Hurdle – (5) – Theatreworld (1996), Istabraq (1997, 1998, 1999, 2001)
- Paddy Power Future Champions Novice Hurdle – (1) – Istabraq (1996)
- Royal Bond Novice Hurdle – (2) – Thats My Man (1995), Istabraq (1996)
- Chanelle Pharma Novice Hurdle – (2) – Hotel Minella (1995), Istabraq (1997)
- Hatton's Grace Hurdle – (2) – Istabraq (1997, 1998)
- Alanna Homes Champion Novice Hurdle – (1) – Istabraq (1997)
- Drinmore Novice Chase – (1) – Private Peace (1997)
- Herald Champion Novice Hurdle – (1) – Hotel Minella (1995)
- Slaney Novice Hurdle – (2) – Minella Lad (1995), Promalee (1998)
- John Durkan Memorial Punchestown Chase – (1) – Royal Mountbrowne (1996)
- Champion Four Year Old Hurdle – (2) – Glenstal Flagship (1994), Shaunies Lady (1996)
- Arkle Novice Chase – (1) – Private Peace (1998)

Australia

- Cox Plate – (1) – Adelaide (2014)
- LKS Mackinnon Stakes - (1) - Magic Wand (2019)

Canada

- Canadian International – (2) – Ballingarry (2002), Joshua Tree (2010)

France

- Critérium International – (7) – Mount Nelson (2006), Jan Vermeer (2009), Roderic O'Connor (2010), Johannes Vermeer (2015), Van Gogh (2020), Twain (2024), Puerto Rico (2025)
- Critérium de Saint-Cloud – (7) – Ballingarry (2001), Alberto Giacometti (2002), Fame and Glory (2008), Recital (2010), Los Angeles (2023), Pierre Bonnard (2025), Drumbeat (2026)
- Grand Prix de Paris – (5) – Scorpion (2005), Imperial Monarch (2012), Kew Gardens (2018), Japan (2019), Mogul (2020)
- Grand Prix de Saint-Cloud – (1) - Broome (2021)
- Poule d'Essai des Poulains – (6) – Landseer (2002), Aussie Rules (2006), Astronomer Royal (2007), The Gurkha (2016), St Mark's Basilica (2021), Henri Matisse (2025)
- Prix de la Forêt - (1) - True Love (2026)
- Prix du Cadran - (2) - Kyprios (2022, 2024)
- Poule d'Essai des Pouliches – (2) – Rose Gypsy (2001), Diamond Necklace (2026)
- Prix de l'Arc de Triomphe – (2) – Dylan Thomas (2007), Found (2016)
- Prix de l'Opéra - (1) - Rhododendron (2017)
- Prix de Diane - (2) - Joan of Arc (2021), Diamond Necklace (2026)
- Prix Jean Prat - (1) - Tenebrism (2022)
- Prix du Jockey Club – (3) – St Mark's Basilica (2021), Camille Pissarro (2025), Constitution River (2026)
- Prix Ganay – (2) – Dylan Thomas (2007), Duke of Marmalade (2008)
- Prix Jacques Le Marois – (2) – Excelebration (2012), Diego Velazquez (2025)
- Prix Jean-Luc Lagardère – (10) – Second Empire (1997), Ciro (1999), Rock of Gibraltar (2001), Hold That Tiger (2002), Oratorio (2004), Horatio Nelson (2005), Holy Roman Emperor (2006), Happily (2017), Camille Pissarro (2024), Puerto Rico (2025)
- Prix Lupin – (1) – Ciro (2000)
- Prix Marcel Boussac – (6) – Rumplestiltskin (2005), Misty for Me (2010), Found (2014), Ballydoyle (2015), Opera Singer (2023), Diamond Necklace (2025)
- Prix Maurice de Gheest – (1) – King Charlemagne (2001)
- Prix Morny – (5) – Orpen (1998), Fasliyev (1999), Johannesburg (2001), Blackbeard (2022), Whistlejacket (2024)
- Prix du Moulin de Longchamp – (2) – Rock of Gibraltar (2002), Circus Maximus (2019)
- Prix Rothschild - (2) - Roly Poly (2017), Mother Earth (2021)
- Prix de Royallieu – (1) – Grateful (2024)
- Prix Royal-Oak – (2) – Yeats (2008), Queenstown (2026)
- Prix de la Salamandre – (1) – Giant's Causeway (1999)
- Prix Vermeille - (1) - Warm Heart (2023)

Qatar

- Irish Thoroughbred Marketing Cup – (1) – Order Of Australia (2023)

(United Kingdom) Great Britain

- 1000 Guineas – (8) – Virginia Waters (2005), Homecoming Queen (2012), Minding (2016), Winter (2017), Hermosa (2019), Love (2020), Mother Earth (2021), True Love (2026)
- 2000 Guineas – (10) – King of Kings (1998), Rock of Gibraltar (2002), Footstepsinthesand (2005), George Washington (2006), Henrythenavigator (2008), Camelot (2012), Gleneagles (2015), Churchill (2017), Saxon Warrior (2018), Magna Grecia (2019)
- Aintree Hurdle – (2) – Urubande (1996), Istabraq (1999)
- Ascot Gold Cup – (10) – Yeats (2006, 2007, 2008, 2009), Fame and Glory (2011), Leading Light (2014), Order of St George (2016), Kyprios (2022, 2024), Scandinavia (2026)
- Baring Bingham Novices' Hurdle – (2) – Urubande (1996), Istabraq (1997)
- British Champions Fillies and Mares Stakes - (3) - Hydrangea (2017), Magical (2018), Minnie Hauk (2026)
- British Champions Sprint Stakes - (1) - Bianconi (1998)
- Champion Hurdle – (3) – Istabraq (1998, 1999, 2000)
- Champion Stakes – (1) – Magical (2019)
- Cheveley Park Stakes - (7) - Brave Anna (2016), Clemmie (2017), Fairyland (2018), Tenebrism (2021), Lake Victoria (2024), True Love (2025), Sun Goddess (2026)
- Commonwealth Cup - (1) - Caravaggio (2017)
- Coronation Cup – (10) – Yeats (2005), Scorpion (2007), Soldier of Fortune (2008), Fame and Glory (2010), St Nicholas Abbey (2011, 2012, 2013), Highland Reel (2017), Luxembourg (2024), Jan Brueghel (2025)
- Coronation Stakes – (4) – Sophisticat (2002), Lillie Langtry (2010), Winter (2017), Precise (2026)
- Diamond Jubilee Stakes - (2) - Starspangledbanner (2010), Merchant Navy (2018)
- Epsom Derby – (12) – Galileo (2001), High Chaparral (2002), Camelot (2012), Ruler of the World (2013), Australia (2014), Wings of Eagles (2017), Anthony Van Dyck (2019), Serpentine (2020), Auguste Rodin (2023), City of Troy (2024), Lambourn (2025), Christmas Day (2026)
- Dewhurst Stakes – (9) – Rock of Gibraltar (2001), Beethoven (2009), War Command (2013), Air Force Blue (2015), Churchill (2016), U S Navy Flag (2017), St Mark's Basilica (2020), City of Troy (2023), Darkness Falls (2026)
- Eclipse Stakes – (10) – Giant's Causeway (2000), Hawk Wing (2002), Oratorio (2005), Mount Nelson (2008), So You Think (2011), St Mark's Basilica (2021), Paddington (2023), City of Troy (2024), Delacroix (2025), Constitution River (2026)
- Falmouth Stakes - (2) - Alice Springs (2016), Roly Poly (2017)
- Fillies' Mile – (7) – Sunspangled (1998), Listen (2007), Together Forever (2014), Minding (2015), Rhododendron (2016), Ylang Ylang (2023), Precise (2025)
- Futurity Trophy – (13) – Saratoga Springs (1997), Aristotle (1999), High Chaparral (2001), Brian Boru (2002), St Nicholas Abbey (2009), Camelot (2011), Kingsbarns (2012), Saxon Warrior (2017), Magna Grecia (2018), Luxembourg (2021), Auguste Rodin (2022), Hawk Mountain (2025), Giant Sequoia (2026)
- Goodwood Cup - (6) - Yeats (2006, 2008), Kyprios (2022, 2024), Scandinavia (2025, 2026)
- International Stakes – (7) – Giant's Causeway (2000), Duke of Marmalade (2008), Rip Van Winkle (2010), Declaration of War (2013), Australia (2014), Japan (2019), City of Troy (2024)
- July Cup – (5) – Stravinsky (1999), Mozart (2001), Starspangledbanner (2010), U S Navy Flag (2018), Ten Sovereigns (2019)
- King Charles III Stakes - (1) - Mission Central (2026)
- King George VI and Queen Elizabeth Stakes – (4) – Galileo (2001), Dylan Thomas (2007), Duke of Marmalade (2008), Highland Reel (2016)
- Lockinge Stakes – (2) – Hawk Wing (2003), Rhododendron (2018)
- Mersey Novices' Hurdle – (1) – Promalee (1998)
- Middle Park Stakes – (7) – Minardi (2000), Johannesburg (2001), Ad Valorem (2004), Crusade (2011), U S Navy Flag (2017), Ten Sovereigns (2018), Blackbeard (2022)
- Nassau Stakes – (7) – Peeping Fawn (2007), Halfway to Heaven (2008), Minding (2016), Winter (2017), Opera Singer (2024), Whirl (2025), Diamond Necklace (2026)
- Nunthorpe Stakes – (2) – Stravinsky (1999), Mozart (2001)
- Epsom Oaks – (11) – Shahtoush (1998), Imagine (2001), Alexandrova (2006), Was (2012), Qualify (2015), Minding (2016), Forever Together (2018), Love (2020), Snowfall (2021), Tuesday (2022), Minnie Hauk (2025)
- Prince of Wales's Stakes – (5) – Duke of Marmalade (2008), So You Think (2012), Highland Reel (2017), Love (2021), Auguste Rodin (2024)
- Queen Anne Stakes – (4) – Ad Valorem (2006), Haradasun (2008), Declaration of War (2013), Circus Maximus (2020)
- Queen Elizabeth II Stakes – (4) – George Washington (2006), Rip Van Winkle (2009), Excelebration (2012), Minding (2016)
- St. James's Palace Stakes – (9) – Giant's Causeway (2000), Black Minnaloushe (2001), Rock of Gibraltar (2002), Excellent Art (2007), Henrythenavigator (2008), Mastercraftsman (2009), Gleneagles (2015), Circus Maximus (2019), Paddington (2023)
- St Leger – (9) – Milan (2001), Brian Boru (2003), Scorpion (2005), Leading Light (2013), Capri (2017), Kew Gardens (2018), Continuous (2023), Jan Brueghel (2024), Scandinavia (2025)
- Sun Chariot Stakes – (3) – Halfway to Heaven (2008), Alice Springs (2016), Roly Poly (2017)
- Sussex Stakes – (6) – Giant's Causeway (2000), Rock of Gibraltar (2002), Henrythenavigator (2008), Rip Van Winkle (2009), The Gurkha (2016), Paddington (2023)
- Triumph Hurdle - (1) - Ivanovich Gorbatov (2016)
- Yorkshire Oaks – (9) – Alexandrova (2006), Peeping Fawn (2007), Tapestry (2014), Seventh Heaven (2016), Love (2020), Snowfall (2021), Warm Heart (2023), Content (2024), Minnie Hauk (2025)

Hong Kong

- Hong Kong Vase - (3) - Highland Reel (2015, 2017), Mogul (2020)

Saudi Arabia

- Red Sea Turf Handicap – (1) – Tower of London (2024)

Italy

- Gran Criterium – (2) – Sholokhov (2001), Spartacus (2002)
- Gran Premio del Jockey Club – (1) – Black Sam Bellamy (2002)

United Arab Emirates

- Dubai Sheema Classic – (1) – St Nicholas Abbey (2013)
- Dubai Gold Cup – (2) – Broome (2023), Tower of London (2024)
- UAE Derby – (3) – Daddy Long Legs (2012), Lines Of Battle (2013), Mendelssohn (2018)

United States

- Arlington Million – (2) – Powerscourt (2005), Cape Blanco (2011)
- Belmont Derby - (2) - Deauville (2016), Bolshoi Ballet (2021)
- Belmont Oaks - (2) - Athena (2018), Santa Barbara (2021)
- Beverly D. Stakes - (1) - Santa Barbara (2021)
- Breeders' Cup Juvenile – (1) – Johannesburg (2001)
- Breeders' Cup Juvenile Fillies Turf - (2) - Meditate (2022), Lake Victoria (2024), Sun Goddess (2026)
- Breeders' Cup Filly & Mare Turf - (1) Tuesday (2022)
- Breeders' Cup Juvenile Turf – (9) – Wrote (2011), George Vancouver (2012), Hit It A Bomb (2015), Mendelssohn (2017), Victoria Road (2022), Unquestionable (2023), Henri Matisse (2024), Gstaad (2025), Haffner (2026)
- Breeders' Cup Marathon – (1) – Man of Iron (2009)
- Breeders' Cup Mile - (1) - Order of Australia (2020)
- Breeders' Cup Turf – (8) – High Chaparral (2002, 2003 DH), St Nicholas Abbey (2011), Magician (2013), Found (2015), Highland Reel (2016), Auguste Rodin (2023), Benvenuto Cellini (2026)
- Joe Hirsch Turf Classic Invitational Stakes – (1) – Cape Blanco (2011)
- Man o' War Stakes – (1) – Cape Blanco (2011)
- Pegasus World Cup Turf Invitational - (1) - Warm Heart (2024)
- Queen Elizabeth II Challenge Cup Stakes – (1) – Together (2011)
- Secretariat Stakes – (4) – Ciro (2000), Treasure Beach (2011), Adelaide (2014), Highland Reel (2015)
- Shadwell Turf Mile Stakes – (2) – Landseer (2002), Aussie Rules (2006)
- Sword Dancer Stakes - (1) - Bolshoi Ballet (2023)
