= 2006 Epsom Derby =

- Location: Epsom Downs Racecourse
- Date: 3 June 2006
- Winning horse: Sir Percy
- Starting price: 6/1
- Jockey: Martin Dwyer
- Trainer: Marcus Tregoning
- Owner: Anthony Pakenham

Epsom Derby 2006
1–2–3
| Sir Percy | Dragon Dancer | Dylan Thomas |

Also Ran
4–5–6
Hala Bek | Visindar | Best Alibi
7–8–9
Sixties Icon | Mountain | Linda's Lad
10–11–12
Papal Bull | Championship Point | Septimus
13–14–15
Before You Go | Sienna Storm | Atlantic Waves
16–17–18
Snoqualmie Boy | Noddies Way | Horatio Nelson

The 2006 Epsom Derby was a horse race which took place at Epsom Downs on Saturday 3 June 2006. It was the 227th running of the Derby, and it was won by Sir Percy. The winner was ridden by Martin Dwyer and trained by Marcus Tregoning. The pre-race favourite Visindar finished fifth.

== Race details ==
- Sponsor: Vodafone
- Winner's prize money: £740,695
- Going: Good to Firm
- Number of runners: 18
- Winner's time: 2m 35.23s

== Full result ==
| | * | Horse | Jockey | Trainer ^{†} | SP |
| 1 | | Sir Percy | Martin Dwyer | Marcus Tregoning | 6/1 |
| 2 | shd | Dragon Dancer | Darryll Holland | Geoff Wragg | 66/1 |
| 3 | hd | Dylan Thomas | Johnny Murtagh | Aidan O'Brien (IRE) | 25/1 |
| 4 | shd | Hala Bek | Philip Robinson | Michael Jarvis | 9/1 |
| 5 | 2 | Visindar | Christophe Soumillon | André Fabre (FR) | 2/1 fav |
| 6 | 1 | Best Alibi | Ryan Moore | Sir Michael Stoute | 33/1 |
| 7 | 2 | Sixties Icon | Shane Kelly | Jeremy Noseda | 66/1 |
| 8 | 1¼ | Mountain | Seamie Heffernan | Aidan O'Brien (IRE) | 50/1 |
| 9 | 1¼ | Linda's Lad | Frankie Dettori | André Fabre (FR) | 9/1 |
| 10 | ¾ | Papal Bull | Robert Winston | Sir Michael Stoute | 11/1 |
| 11 | 1½ | Championship Point | Ted Durcan | Mick Channon | 12/1 |
| 12 | 1¼ | Septimus | Michael Kinane | Aidan O'Brien (IRE) | 17/2 |
| 13 | 1¾ | Before You Go | Ian Mongan | Terry Mills | 100/1 |
| 14 | ½ | Sienna Storm | Michael Hills | Mark Tompkins | 200/1 |
| 15 | 4 | Atlantic Waves | Joe Fanning | Mark Johnston | 25/1 |
| 16 | 2½ | Snoqualmie Boy | John Egan | David Elsworth | 150/1 |
| 17 | 10 | Noddies Way | Robert Miles | John Panvert | 500/1 |
| PU | | Horatio Nelson | Kieren Fallon | Aidan O'Brien (IRE) | 11/2 |

* The distances between the horses are shown in lengths or shorter. shd = short-head; hd = head; PU = pulled up.
† Trainers are based in Great Britain unless indicated.

== Winner's details ==
Further details of the winner, Sir Percy:

- Foaled: 27 January 2003 in Great Britain
- Sire: Mark of Esteem; Dam: Percy's Lass (Blakeney)
- Owner: Anthony Pakenham
- Breeder: The Old Suffolk Stud
- Rating in 2006 World Thoroughbred Racehorse Rankings: 121

== Form analysis ==
=== Two-year-old races ===
Notable runs by the future Derby participants as two-year-olds in 2005.

- Sir Percy – 1st Vintage Stakes, 1st Dewhurst Stakes
- Dylan Thomas – 2nd Autumn Stakes, 6th Racing Post Trophy
- Best Alibi – 4th Racing Post Trophy
- Mountain – 4th Eyrefield Stakes
- Linda's Lad – 2nd Prix des Chênes, 1st Prix de Condé, 1st Critérium de Saint-Cloud
- Championship Point – 1st Chesham Stakes
- Septimus – 1st Beresford Stakes, 3rd Racing Post Trophy
- Sienna Storm – 7th Silver Tankard Stakes
- Atlantic Waves – 5th Autumn Stakes
- Horatio Nelson – 1st Superlative Stakes, 1st Futurity Stakes, 1st Prix Jean-Luc Lagardère, 2nd Dewhurst Stakes

=== The road to Epsom ===
Early-season appearances in 2006 and trial races prior to running in the Derby.

- Sir Percy – 2nd 2,000 Guineas
- Dragon Dancer – 2nd Chester Vase
- Dylan Thomas – 1st Derrinstown Stud Derby Trial
- Visindar – 1st Prix Greffulhe
- Best Alibi – 2nd Dante Stakes
- Mountain – 4th Ballysax Stakes, 2nd Derrinstown Stud Derby Trial
- Linda's Lad – 4th Prix Noailles, 1st Lingfield Derby Trial
- Papal Bull – 1st Chester Vase
- Championship Point – 1st Predominate Stakes
- Septimus – 7th Prix La Force, 1st Dante Stakes
- Before You Go – 1st Blue Riband Trial Stakes, 4th Lingfield Derby Trial
- Sienna Storm – 3rd Blue Riband Trial Stakes, 2nd Predominate Stakes
- Atlantic Waves – 1st Feilden Stakes
- Snoqualmie Boy – 3rd Dante Stakes
- Horatio Nelson – 8th 2,000 Guineas

=== Subsequent Group 1 wins ===
Group 1 / Grade I victories after running in the Derby.

- Dylan Thomas – Irish Derby (2006), Irish Champion Stakes (2006, 2007), Prix Ganay (2007), King George VI and Queen Elizabeth Stakes (2007), Prix de l'Arc de Triomphe (2007)
- Sixties Icon – St. Leger (2006)
- Septimus – Irish St. Leger (2008)

== Subsequent breeding careers ==
Leading progeny of participants in the 2006 Epsom Derby.

=== Sires of Group/Grade One winners ===
Sir Percy (1st)

- Wake Forest - 1st Man o' War Stakes (2016)
- Sir John Hawkwood - 1st The Metropolitan (2016)
- Flighty Lady - 3rd Prix Marcel Boussac (2019)
- Presenting Percy - 1st RSA Insurance Novices' Chase (2018)

Dylan Thomas (3rd)

- Blazing Speed - 1st Queen Elizabeth II Cup (2015)
- Dylan Mouth - 1st Derby Italiano (2014)
- Pretty Please - dam of Persian King (1st Poule d'Essai des Poulains 2019)
- Peter The Mayo Man - 3rd Dovecote Novices' Hurdle (2017)

=== Sires of National Hunt horses ===
Linda's Lad (8th)

- Draconien - 1st Herald Champion Novice Hurdle (2018)
- Tout Est Permis - 1st Kinloch Brae Chase (2018)
- Cash Back - 2nd Arkle Novice Chase (2020)

=== Other Stallions ===
Sixties Icon (7th) - Standing in Great Britain but shuttles to Argentina - Sired Argentinian Group 1 winners Crazy Icon and Sixties Song along with useful hurdler Buildmeupbuttercup
Dragon Dancer (2nd) - Sired jumps winners including Goodbye Dancer
Papal Bull (10th) - Sired flat and jumps winners including The Jam Man (2nd William Fry Handicap Hurdle 2020)
Hala Bek (4th) - Exported to Australia
Visindar (5th) - Exported to Spain
Championship Point (11th) - Exported to Saudi Arabia
Atlantic Waves (15th) - Sired flat placed horse
