= Floodlit Stakes =

Flat horse race in Britain

- Class: Listed
- Location: Kempton Park, Sunbury, England
- Inaugurated: 2007
- Race type: Flat / Thoroughbred
- Sponsor: Unibet
- Website: Kempton Park

Race information
- Distance: 1m 3f 219yd (2,413 metres)
- Surface: Polytrack
- Track: Right-handed
- Qualification: Three-years-old and up excl G1 or G2 winners since 31 March
- Weight: 9 st 2 lb (3yo); 9 st 7 lb (4yo+); Allowances; 5 lb for fillies and mares Penalties; 5 lb for Group 3 winners * 3 lb for Listed winners * * after 31 March
- Purse: £50,000 (2025); 1st: £28,355

Floodlit Stakes
2025
Shader	West Wind Blows	Siempre Arturo

Previous years
2024
Military Academy	Aimeric	Penzance
2023
Lion's Pride	Measured Time	Belloccio
2022
Warren Point	Wild Crusade	Candleford
2021
Shandoz	Desert Fire	Dubai Future

2020-2011
2019
Young Rascal	Loxley	Spirit Of Appin
2018
Kasperenko	Architecture	Podemos
2017
Titi Makfi	Red Verdon	Dylan Mouth
2016
Western Hymn	Star Storm	Restorer
2015
Missed Call	Hamelin	Dartmouth
2014
Grendisar	Fire Fighting	Rydan
2013
Pether's Moon	Gatewood	Aussie Reigns
2012
Spring Of Fame	Modun	Viking Storm
2011
Prince Bishop	Parlour Games	Laaheb

2010-2006
2010
Dansili Dancer	Mastery	Age Of Reason
2009
Once More Dubai	Age Of Reason	Beauchamp Xerxes
2008
Spanish Moon	Re Barolo	Scintillo
2007
Dansant	Into The Dark	Illustrious Blue
2006
Odiham	Mudawin	Barolo

The Floodlit Stakes is a Listed flat horse race in Great Britain, which is open to horses aged three years or older. It is run at Kempton Park over a distance of 1 mile, 3 furlongs and 219 yards (2,414 metres). It is scheduled to take place each year in November.

The race was first run in 2006, over a distance of 2 miles, but was reduced to its current distance in 2007.

== Winners ==
Year	Winner	Age	Jockey	Trainer	Time
2006	Odiham	5	Steve Drowne	Hughie Morrison	3:30.98
2007	Dansant	3	Eddie Ahern	Gerard Butler	2:30.48
2008	Spanish Moon	4	Ryan Moore	Sir Michael Stoute	2:32.61
2009	Once More Dubai	4	Alan Munro	Saeed bin Suroor	2:36.09
2010 (dh)	Mastery; Dansili Dancer	4; 8	Ted Durcan; Adam Kirby	Saeed bin Suroor; Clive Cox	2:32.90
2011	Prince Bishop	4	Silvestre de Sousa	Saeed bin Suroor	2:29.33
2012	Spring Of Fame	6	Mickael Barzalona	Saeed bin Suroor	2:28.99
2013	Pether's Moon	3	Sean Levey	Richard Hannon Sr.	2:32.01
2014	Grendisar	4	Martin Harley	Marco Botti	2:32.78
2015	Missed Call	5	Tom Queally	James Fanshawe	2:31.91
2016	Western Hymn	5	Robert Havlin	John Gosden	2:29.28
2017	Titi Makfi	3	Franny Norton	Mark Johnston	2:31.91
2018	Kasperenko	4	Martin Harley	Brendan Powell snr	2:29.02
2019	Young Rascal	4	Tom Marquand	William Haggas	2:30.64
2020	Loxley	5	William Buick	Charlie Appleby	2:35.46
2021	Shandoz	4	David Egan	Roger Varian	2:33.70
2022	Warren Point	3	James Doyle	Charlie Appleby	2:35.62
2023	Lions Pride	3	Robert Havlin	John & Thady Gosden	2:35.26
2024	Military Academy	3	Kieran Shoemark	John & Thady Gosden	2:29.79
2025	Shader	4	Colin Keane	John & Thady Gosden	2:29.45

== See also ==
- Horse racing in Great Britain
- List of British flat horse races
