= Precision =

Precision, precise or precisely may refer to:

== Arts and media ==
- Precision (march), the official marching music of the Royal Military College of Canada
- "Precision" (song), by Big Sean
- Precisely (sketch), a dramatic sketch by the English playwright Harold Pinter

== Science, and technology, and mathematics ==
=== Mathematics and computing (general) ===
- Accuracy and precision, measurement deviation from true value and its scatter
- Significant figures, the number of digits that carry real information about a measurement
- Precision and recall, in information retrieval: the proportion of relevant documents returned
- Precision (computer science), a measure of the detail in which a quantity is expressed
- Precision (statistics), a model parameter or a quantification of precision

=== Computing products ===
- Dell Precision, a line of Dell workstations
- Precision Architecture, former name for PA-RISC, a reduced instruction set architecture developed by Hewlett-Packard
- Ubuntu 12.04 "Precise Pangolin", Canonical's sixteenth release of Ubuntu

== Companies ==
- Precision Air, an airline based in Tanzania
- Precision Castparts Corp., a casting company based in Portland, Oregon, in the United States
- Precision Drilling, the largest drilling-rig contractor in Canada
- Precision Monolithics, an American company that produced linear semiconductors
- Precision Talent, a voice-over talent-management company
- F. E. Baker Ltd, maker of Precision motorcycle and cycle-car engines pre-WW1
- Precisely (company), formerly Syncsort
- Precision, a fintech platform from Etraveli Group

== Other uses ==
- Precision Club, a bidding system in the game of contract bridge
- Precision 15, a self-bailing dinghy
- Fender Precision Bass, by Fender Musical Instruments Corporation

== See also ==
- Precisionism, an artistic movement also known as Cubist Realism
- Precisionist (1981–2006), an American Hall of Fame Thoroughbred racehorse
