= Pether's Moon =

Irish-bred Thoroughbred racehorse

- Racing silks of John Manley
- Sire: Dylan Thomas
- Grandsire: Danehill
- Dam: Softly Tread
- Damsire: Tirol
- Sex: Stallion
- Foaled: 15 April 2010
- Country: Ireland
- Colour: Bay
- Breeder: Michael G Daly
- Owner: John Manley
- Trainer: Richard Hannon Sr. Richard Hannon Jr.
- Record: 21: 7-6-4
- Earnings: £584,391

Major wins
- Floodlit Stakes (2013); Glorious Stakes (2014); Bosphorus Cup (2014); Cumberland Lodge Stakes (2014); Coronation Cup (2015)

Pether's Moon (foaled 15 April 2010) is an Irish-bred, British-trained Thoroughbred racehorse and sire best known for his win in the 2015 Coronation Cup. After showing some promise as a juvenile in 2012 he became a successful handicapper in the following year and ended his season with a win in the Listed Floodlit Stakes. As a four-year-old in 2014 he became a Group race performer, winning the Glorious Stakes and the Cumberland Lodge Stakes in England and the Bosphorus Cup in Turkey. In 2015 he was beaten in his first two races but then recorded his biggest win in the Group One Coronation Cup. He did not race again and was retired to become a breeding stallion.

== Background ==
Pether's Moon is a bay horse with no white markings bred in Ireland by Michael G Daly. As a yearling in September 2011 the colt was offered for sale at the Tattersalls Ireland sale and was bought for €52,000 by the bloodstock agents Peter & Ross Doyle. The colt entered the ownership of John Manley and was sent into training with Richard Hannon at East Everleigh in Wiltshire.

He was from the second crop of foals sired by Dylan Thomas and outstanding middle-distance runner who was named Cartier Horse of the Year for 2007. His other offspring have included Blazing Speed (Queen Elizabeth II Cup), Dylan Mouth, Nymphea (Grosser Preis von Berlin) and Tannery (E. P. Taylor Stakes). Pether's Moon's dam Softly Tread was a high-class filly who won three of her seven races including the Tyros Stakes and the Gladness Stakes. She was a distant, female-line descendant of the influential British broodmare Fancy Free.

== Racing career ==
=== 2012: two-year-old season ===
On his racecourse debut, Pether's Moon started 11/4 favourite for a maiden race over nine furlongs at Goodwood Racecourse on 25 September. Ridden by Richard Hughes he started slowly and never looked likely to win and finished seventh, eighteen lengths behind the winner Sweet Deal. Four weeks later he started at odds of 14/1 for a one-mile maiden on the synthetic Polytrack surface at Kempton Park Racecourse and produced a much better effort, staying on in the closing stages and finishing second by a neck to the Godolphin runner Secret Number.

=== 2013: three-year-old season ===
Pether's Moon began his second season in a one-mile maiden on Kempton's polytrack and recorded his first victory as he led from the start and kept on well to win by a lengths from Thatchmaster. In his next five starts the colt competed in handicap races. After finishing second over ten furlongs at Salisbury Racecourse in May he was moved up to one and a half miles for the King George V Stakes at Royal Ascot in June and finished unplaced behind Elidor after being blocked twice when attempting to obtain a clear run in the straight. At Newmarket Racecourse in July he started 6/4 favourite for the Egerton House Handicap but was beaten a neck by the Luca Cumani-trained Havana Cooler. On his next appearance at Goodwood on 3 August Pether's Moon was assigned a weight of 129 pounds in the RAC Stakes and started at odds of 4/1 against eight opponents including Havana Cooler, Elidor and the Queen's colt Bold Sniper (the 3/1 favourite). After starting well he was restrained by Hughes at the rear of the field before making steady progress in the straight. He took the lead inside the final furlong and won "readily" by one and a quarter lengths from Salutation.

In September, Pether's Moon was matched against older horses in the Mallard Stakes at Doncaster Racecourse and finished third behind the John Gosden-trained five-year-old Camborne. The colt ended his season with a return to Kempton's synthetic surface and a step up in class for the Listed Floodlit Stakes over one and a half miles on 6 November. Ridden by Sean Levey he started the 7/2 third choice in the betting behind Gatewood (winner of the Geelong Cup) and the Godolphin runner Urban Dance. Pether's Moon led from the start and steadily increased the pace before going clear of his rivals in the straight and winning by three and three quarter lengths from Gatewood. After the race his trainer's assistant Tony Gorman commented "He's a lovely horse and we fancied him tonight. We've always thought he was a really good horse and he'll be stepping up another level next year".

When Richard Hannon retired at the end of the 2013 season, his training operation was taken over by his son, Richard Hannon Jr.

=== 2014: four-year-old season ===
In 2004 Pether's Moon was campaigned exclusively in weight-for-age races and began his season by contesting his first Group race when he started at odds of 10/1 for the Jockey Club Stakes at Newmarket in April. He finished second to the Michael Stoute-trained Gospel Choir with the odds-on favourite Trading Leather in third and the dual Doncaster Cup winner Times Up unplaced. After being narrowly beaten when attempting to concede three pounds to Gatewood in the Buckhounds Stakes in May he was sent to Royal Ascot for the second time and finished third behind Telescope and Hillstar in the Hardwicke Stakes. In the Princess of Wales's Stakes at Newmarket on 10 July he was beaten less than a length when taking third place behind Cavalryman and Telescope. On 1 August started 11/10 favourite for the Group Three Glorious Stakes over one and a half miles at Goodwood against six opponents including Encke, Quest For Peace (winner of the race in 2012) and Battle of Marengo (Derrinstown Stud Derby Trial). Hughes settled the favourite behind the leaders as Battle of Marengo set the pace before making a forward move on the inside in the straight. Pether's Moon took the lead approaching the final furlong and went clear of the field to win by a length and a quarter from Encke despite being eased down in the final strides. After the race Hughes said "He is not ungenuine, he is just lazy. You think you are going better than you are and you don't find a whole lot but he finds enough to get there. He is a big, late maturing horse". Richard Hannon commented "We like him a lot and he's very much one we'd like to keep as he's still growing into his frame. There are plenty of options for him abroad and the Caulfield Cup is one we're considering".

Two weeks after his win at Goodwood Pether's Moon started favourite for the Geoffrey Freer Stakes over thirteen and a half furlongs at Newbury Racecourse but ran poorly and finished ninth of the eleven runners behind the six-year-old gelding Seismos. He was then sent to Turkey for the Bosphorus Cup over 2400 metres on very soft ground at Veliefendi Race Course on 7 September. Starting the 2/5 favourite he was held up at the rear of the six-runner field before taking the lead 200 metres from the finish. He quickly went clear before idling in the closing stages and winning by a length from the locally trained Village Wind with the German challengers Vif Monsieur and Nymphea in third and fourth.

On his return to Britain Pether's Moon contested the Cumberland Lodge Stakes at Ascot on 4 October. He started second favourite behind Encke in a five-runner field which also included Parish Hall (Dewhurst Stakes) and the Brazilian mare Energia Fribby. Ridden by Pat Dobbs he raced in second place behind Encke before taking the lead a furlong out and held off the late challenge of Parish Hall to win by a neck. Two weeks later, on his final run of the year, Pether's Moon was dropped in distance for the Champion Stakes over ten furlongs in which he started a 25/1 outsider and finished seventh of the nine runners behind Noble Mission.

=== 2015: five-year-old season ===
Pether's Moon began his fourth season in John Porter Stakes at Newbury in April and started a 10/1 outsider in an eight-runner field headed by Romsdal, a four-year-old who had finished third in the 2014 Epsom Derby and third in the St Leger. After racing in second place, Pether's moved up to dispute the lead in the straight and finished second to Arab Spring with Romsdal in third place. At Newmarket in May he ran for the second time in the Jockey Club Cup but produced a very disappointing performance to finish third behind Second Step and Telescope, beaten more than eighteen lengths by the winner.

The horse the contested the 110th running of the Coronation Cup which took place on 6 June over one and a half miles at Epsom Racecourse and attracted a field of four runners. The French challengers Dolniya (Sheema Classic) and Flintshire dominated the betting with Pether's Moon third choice on 11/1 ahead of Sheikhzayedroad (Northern Dancer Turf Stakes). Pat Dobbs settled the horse at the rear of the four runner field before moving up to third at half way as Dolniya set a steady pace from Sheikhzayedroad. In the straight Dolniya repelled a challenge from Flintshire but Pether's Moon made steady progress on the inside before switching right inside the final furlong. He caught the French filly in the final strides and won by a neck, with Flintshire a length and a half back in third place. After the race Richard Hannon Jr. said "I must admit I didn’t see that coming. His last run was very moderate. He's been around the circuit this horse and probably deserves a bit more credit than he gets. John Manley, his owner, always tries him pretty hard. This was his entry and well done to him. John has really enjoyed this horse, he might go to Melbourne (Melbourne Cup), I don’t know. Pat has given him a super ride. Richard Hughes has ridden some lovely races on him as well, but he really goes for Dobbsy". Dobbs, who was riding his first Group One winner said "He was very good. He's loads of ability, but he pulls up when he gets to the front. Even though I got there late, I could feel him pulling up in the last 50 yards, but he's got plenty of class. He's run some good races, he obviously handled the track and he loves fast ground.

Pether's Moon did not race again and was retired at the end of the season.

== Stud record ==
After his retirement from racing Pether's Moon became a breeding Stallion at the Yorton Stud at Leighton near Welshpool in Wales.

== Pedigree ==
Pedigree of Pether's Moon (IRE), bay colt, 2010
Sire Dylan Thomas (IRE) 2003	Danehill (USA); 1986	Danzig	Northern Dancer
Sire Dylan Thomas (IRE) 2003	Danehill (USA); 1986	Danzig	Pas de Nom
Sire Dylan Thomas (IRE) 2003	Danehill (USA); 1986	Razyana	His Majesty
Sire Dylan Thomas (IRE) 2003	Danehill (USA); 1986	Razyana	Spring Adieu
Sire Dylan Thomas (IRE) 2003	Lagrion (USA); 1989	Diesis	Sharpen Up
Sire Dylan Thomas (IRE) 2003	Lagrion (USA); 1989	Diesis	Doubly Sure
Sire Dylan Thomas (IRE) 2003	Lagrion (USA); 1989	Wrap It Up	Mount Hagen
Sire Dylan Thomas (IRE) 2003	Lagrion (USA); 1989	Wrap It Up	Doc Nan
Dam Softly Tread (IRE) 1998	Tirol (IRE); 1987	Thatching	Thatch
Dam Softly Tread (IRE) 1998	Tirol (IRE); 1987	Thatching	Abella
Dam Softly Tread (IRE) 1998	Tirol (IRE); 1987	Alpine Niece	Great Nephew
Dam Softly Tread (IRE) 1998	Tirol (IRE); 1987	Alpine Niece	Fragrant Morn
Dam Softly Tread (IRE) 1998	Second Guess (IRE); 1986	Ela-Mana-Mou	Pitcairn
Dam Softly Tread (IRE) 1998	Second Guess (IRE); 1986	Ela-Mana-Mou	Rose Bertin
Dam Softly Tread (IRE) 1998	Second Guess (IRE); 1986	Warning Sound	Red Alert
Dam Softly Tread (IRE) 1998	Second Guess (IRE); 1986	Warning Sound	Shenachie (Family: 20-c)
