= 2006 Prix de l'Arc de Triomphe =

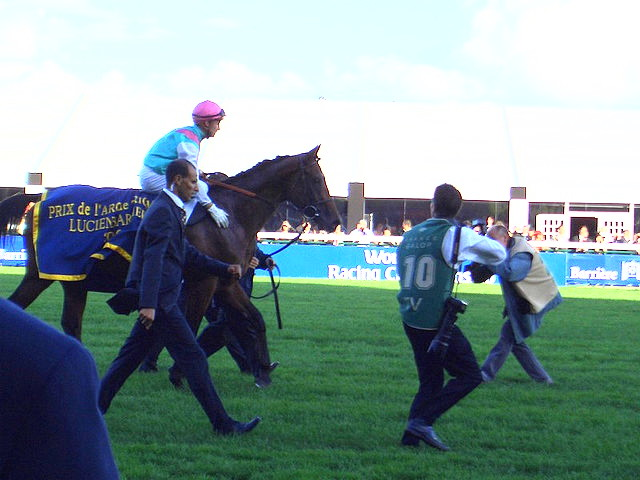
- 2006 Prix de l'Arc de Triomphe winner Rail Link
- Location: Longchamp Racecourse
- Date: October 1, 2006
- Winning horse: Rail Link

The 2006 Prix de l'Arc de Triomphe was a horse race held at Longchamp on Sunday 1 October 2006. It was the 85th running of the Prix de l'Arc de Triomphe.

The winner was Rail Link, a three-year-old colt trained in France by André Fabre. The winning jockey was Stéphane Pasquier.

== Race details ==
- Sponsor: Groupe Lucien Barrière
- Purse: €2,000,000; First prize: €1,142,800
- Going: Good
- Distance: 2,400 metres
- Number of runners: 8
- Winner's time: 2m 26.3s

== Full result ==
Racing silks of Khalid Abdullah, owner of Rail Link

Pos.	Marg.	Horse	Age	Jockey	Trainer (Country)
1		Rail Link	3	Stéphane Pasquier	André Fabre (FR)
2	nk	Pride	6	Christophe Lemaire	Alain de Royer-Dupré (FR)
	½	Deep Impact (disq.)	4	Yutaka Take	Yasuo Ikee (JPN)
3	2½	Hurricane Run	4	Kieren Fallon	André Fabre (FR)
4	2	Best Name	3	Olivier Peslier	Robert Collet (FR)
5	snk	Irish Wells	3	Dominique Boeuf	François Rohaut (FR)
6	4	Sixties Icon	3	Frankie Dettori	Jeremy Noseda (GB)
7	1½	Shirocco	5	Christophe Soumillon	André Fabre (FR)

- Abbreviations: snk = short-neck; nk = neck

== Winner's details ==
Further details of the winner, Rail Link.

- Sex: Colt
- Foaled: 26 March 2003
- Country: Great Britain
- Sire: Dansili; Dam: Docklands (Theatrical)
- Owner: Khalid Abdullah
- Breeder: Juddmonte Farms

== Disqualification of Deep Impact ==
The pre-race favourite Deep Impact finished third, but was later disqualified after testing positive for Ipratropium bromide, a banned substance. The disqualification had left a sore spot on Deep Impact's reputation in Japan, with the sharp decline in attendance and betting of that year's Arima Kinen (which was also Deep Impact's retirement race) being attributed by critics to the controversy tainting the image of the horse, and by extension the sport in general among the Japanese public. One of the journalists eligible for voting in the JRA Award, Shunsuke Hamaki of Sports Hochi, also cited this scandal as to why he voted for Daiwa Major as Horse of the Year rather than Deep Impact, stating that fair play was violated by the scandal and "didn't consider the horse for Horse of the Year at all".
