= Rail Link (horse) =

British-bred Thoroughbred racehorse

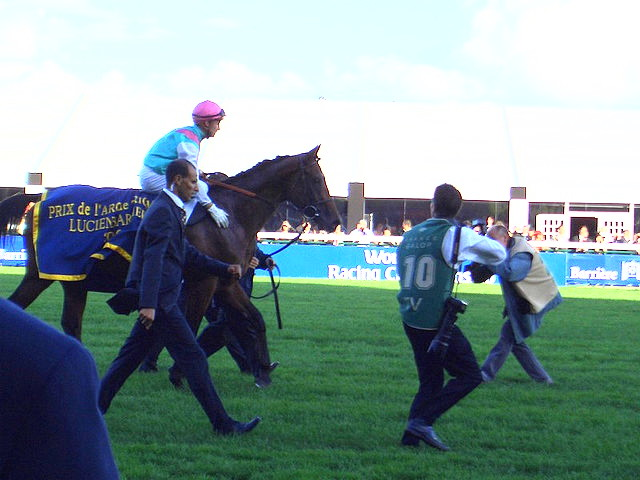
- Rail Link at the 2006 Prix de l'Arc de Triomphe
- Sire: Dansili
- Grandsire: Danehill
- Dam: Docklands
- Damsire: Theatrical
- Sex: Stallion
- Foaled: 2003
- Country: Great Britain
- Colour: Bay
- Breeder: Juddmonte Farms
- Owner: Khalid Abdullah
- Trainer: André Fabre
- Record: 7: 5-1-0
- Earnings: £1,074,965

Major wins
- Prix du Lys (2006); Grand Prix de Paris (2006); Prix Niel (2006); Prix de l'Arc de Triomphe (2006)

Rail Link (26 March 2003 – 20 May 2022) was a thoroughbred racehorse best known for winning the Prix de l'Arc de Triomphe in 2006.

== Background ==
Rail Link was trained by André Fabre, and was ridden by jockey Christophe Soumillon or Stéphane Pasquier for owner Khalid Abdullah.

== Racing career ==
Unraced at two, he made an inauspicious start to his three-year-old career, unseating his rider on his debut at Saint-Cloud, and then finishing second in its next race at Chantilly Racecourse. From then on he was undefeated in five races, winning the Prix Gouvernant, Prix du Lys, Grand Prix de Paris and Prix Niel.

On 1 October 2006 he won the 85th Prix de l'Arc de Triomphe, defeating Pride, Deep Impact, Shirocco, and Hurricane Run.

During the Winter of 2006–7, he suffered a tendon problem and was taken out of training. He was expected to return in the Summer of 2007, but the injury was too serious and he was retired from racing. He was sent to stud at Juddmonte Farms.

== Pedigree ==
Pedigree of Rail Link
Sire Dansili	Danehill	Danzig	Northern Dancer
Sire Dansili	Danehill	Danzig	Pas de Nom
Sire Dansili	Danehill	Razyana	His Majesty
Sire Dansili	Danehill	Razyana	Spring Adieu
Sire Dansili	Hasili	Kahyasi	Ile de Bourbon
Sire Dansili	Hasili	Kahyasi	Kadissya
Sire Dansili	Hasili	Kerali	High Line
Sire Dansili	Hasili	Kerali	Sookera
Dam Docklands	Theatrical	Nureyev	Northern Dancer
Dam Docklands	Theatrical	Nureyev	Special
Dam Docklands	Theatrical	Tree of Knowledge	Sassafrás
Dam Docklands	Theatrical	Tree of Knowledge	Sensibility
Dam Docklands	Dockage	Riverman	Never Bend
Dam Docklands	Dockage	Riverman	River Lady
Dam Docklands	Dockage	Golden Alibi	Empery
Dam Docklands	Dockage	Golden Alibi	Charming Alibi
