= Horatio Nelson (horse) =

Irish-bred Thoroughbred racehorse

- Sire: Danehill
- Grandsire: Danzig
- Dam: Imagine
- Damsire: Sadler's Wells
- Sex: Stallion
- Foaled: 2003
- Country: Ireland
- Colour: Bay
- Breeder: Beaverstone & Tower Bloodstock
- Owner: Sue Magnier & Diane Nagle
- Trainer: Aidan O'Brien
- Record: 7: 4-1-0
- Earnings: £284,236

Major wins
- Superlative Stakes (2005); Futurity Stakes (2005); Prix Jean-Luc Lagardère (2005)
- Last updated on June 21, 2007

Horatio Nelson (2003 – 3 June 2006) was a racehorse sired by Danehill, out of the Irish 1,000 Guineas and Epsom Oaks winner Imagine. His owners were John Magnier and David Nagle. The colt won four of his seven starts, including the Prix Jean-Luc Lagardère at Longchamp Racecourse in October 2005. He competed in the 2006 Epsom Derby but broke down during the race and was later euthanized. He sustained a fractured cannon bone, a sesamoid bone and a dislocated fetlock joint on his right fore leg.
