= Dylan Thomas (horse) =

Irish-bred Thoroughbred racehorse

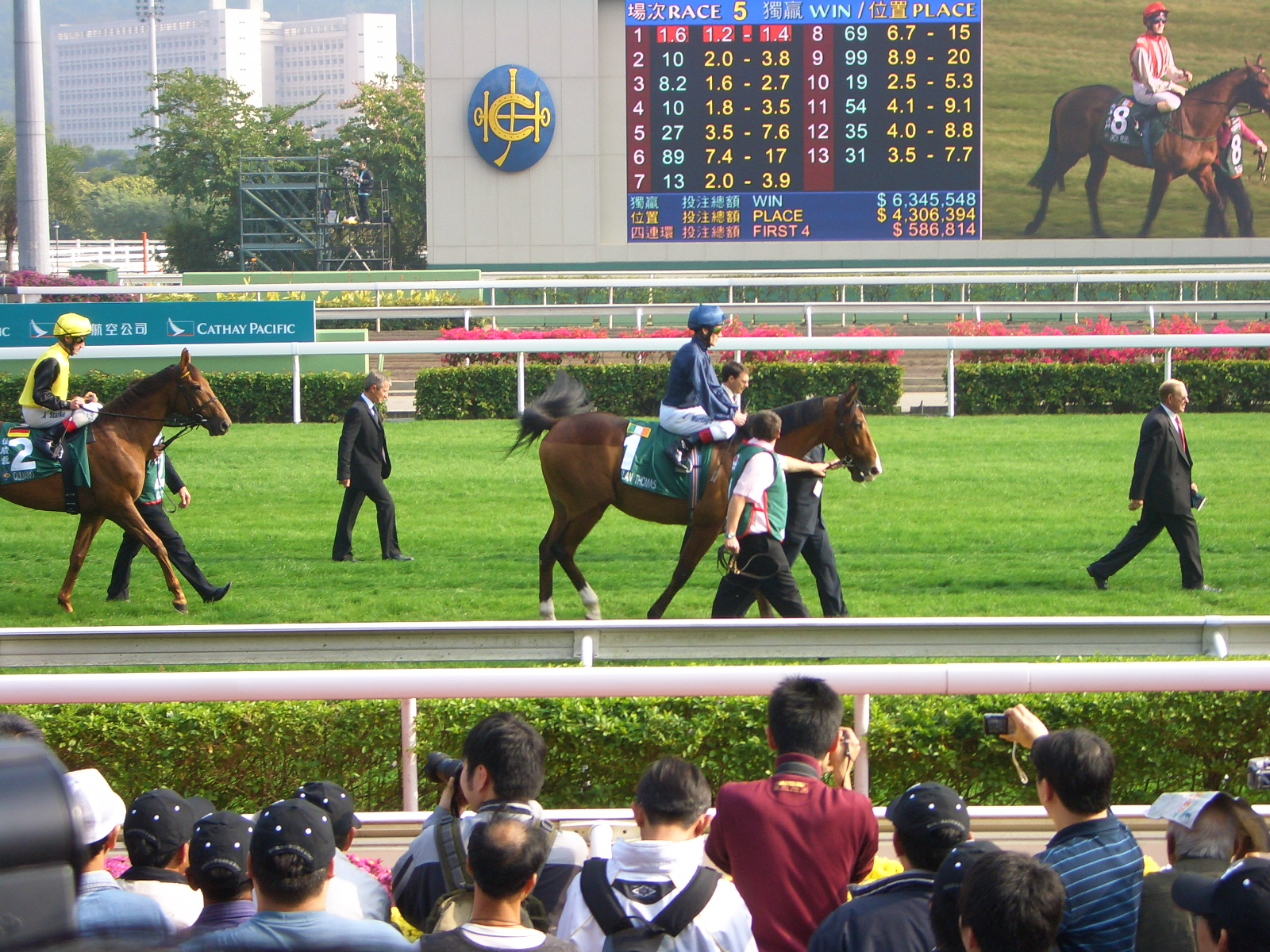
- Dylan Thomas at 2007 Hong Kong Vase
- Sire: Danehill
- Grandsire: Danzig
- Dam: Lagrion
- Damsire: Diesis
- Sex: Stallion
- Foaled: 2003
- Country: Ireland
- Colour: Bay
- Breeder: Tower Bloodstock
- Owner: Sue Magnier and Michael Tabor
- Trainer: Aidan O'Brien
- Record: 18:10-4-1
- Earnings: £3,368,912

Major wins
- Derrinstown Stud Derby Trial (2006); Irish Derby (2006); Irish Champion Stakes (2006, 2007); Prix Ganay (2007); K. George VI & Q. Elizabeth Stakes (2007); Prix de l'Arc de Triomphe (2007)

Awards
- Irish Champion 3yr old & Horse of the year. European Horse of the Year (2007); European Champion Older Horse (2007)
- Last updated on 3 February 2009

Dylan Thomas (foaled 23 April 2003) is a retired Irish Thoroughbred racehorse and active sire. In a racing career which lasted from June 2005 until December 2007, he ran twenty times and won ten races. After winning two minor races in 2005 he improved to become one of the leading European three-year-olds of 2006, winning the Irish Derby and the Irish Champion Stakes as well as finishing a close third in The Derby. In 2007 he won three of Europe's most important weight-for-age races, taking the King George VI and Queen Elizabeth Stakes at Ascot, a second Irish Champion Stakes and the Prix de l'Arc de Triomphe at Longchamp. His performances led to his being named European Horse of the Year in 2007.

== Background ==
Dylan Thomas is a bay horse bred in Ireland by Tower Bloodstock. He was trained in Ireland by Aidan O'Brien and owned by Sue Magnier and Michael Tabor. He was sired by Danehill out of Lagrion, a daughter of Diesis. Dylan Thomas is a half brother to the 2001 European champion two-year-old filly, Queen's Logic and to the 2012 1000 Guineas winner Homecoming Queen.

== Racing career ==
=== 2005: two-year-old season ===
Dylan Thomas made his first racecourse appearance in a maiden race at Tipperary on 30 June. Ridden by Kieren Fallon, he started even money favourite and won by a length from Galantas. He was off the racecourse until 10 September when he ran in the Irish Breeders' Foal Levy Stakes at Leopardstown. He took the lead two furlongs from the finish and won by three quarters of a length from Royal Power despite hanging badly to the right in the closing stages. Dylan Thomas was then sent to England to contest the Group Three Autumn Stakes at Salisbury on 8 October. Ridden by Johnny Murtagh, he started 13/8 favourite, but after leading briefly in the straight he finished second by a neck to Blitzkrieg. The future Dubai World Cup winner Well Armed finished fourth. Three weeks later, Dylan Thomas was moved up to Group One class for the Racing Post Trophy at Doncaster. He made little impression and finished sixth of the seven runners behind Palace Episode.

=== 2006: three-year-old season ===
Dylan Thomas made his three-year-old debut in the Derrinstown Stud Derby Trial over ten furlongs at Leopardstown on 14 May. Ridden by Seamie Heffernan he took the lead early in the straight and stayed on strongly to win from his stable companion Mountain and the English challenger Youmzain. On 3 June, he lined up for The Derby. Ridden by Johnny Murtagh, he was sent to the lead after half a mile and stayed there until headed on the line by winner Sir Percy and runner-up Dragon Dancer. He subsequently won the Irish Derby at the Curragh, ridden by Kieren Fallon. After a summer break, Dylan Thomas beat Ouija Board in a thrilling finish to the Irish Champion Stakes in September.

In late September 2006, Coolmore took the unusual step of sending Dylan Thomas to run in the Jockey Club Gold Cup at Belmont Park, his first (and only) race on dirt where he raced against top US dirt 3yo Bernardini. He never took to the surface and struggled from the break, trailing in a distant last.

=== 2007: four-year-old season ===
As a four-year-old in 2007, Dylan Thomas won the Prix Ganay at Longchamp in France, and the King George VI and Queen Elizabeth Stakes at Ascot, the latter under Johnny Murtagh. On 8 September 2007 he became the first two-time winner of the Irish Champion Stakes and rider Kieren Fallon became the first jockey to win the race three times in succession. He crowned this season with a win in the Prix de l'Arc de Triomphe on soft ground. The victory stood after a half-hour stewards enquiry into interference was caused because Dylan Thomas veered sharply to the right halfway up the home straight, thereby coming across two other runners. Prior to this race, Fallon had described Dylan Thomas as the best horse he had ever ridden.

After the Prix de l'Arc de Triomphe, Dylan Thomas was entered in the John Deere Breeders' Cup Turf, but he did not contend. After he was withdrawn from the Japan Cup, his last race was the Hong Kong Vase, in which he finished 7th. Dylan Thomas retired to Coolmore Stud in Ireland before the end of the year. He raced for Michael Tabor and Susan Magnier, whose husband, John Magnier, is Coolmore's managing partner.

== Assessment ==
Dylan Thomas was named Horse of the Year at the annual Irish Horse Racing Awards in the Shelbourne Hotel, Dublin on Monday 10 December 2007.[3]

== Stud career ==
He was retired at the end of 2007 to stand as a "shuttle stallion" for Coolmore, serving mares at the main Coolmore farm in Ireland during the Northern Hemisphere breeding season and at Coolmore's Australia farm during the Southern Hemisphere breeding season. The most successful of his first crop of foals was the German-trained 4 year old filly Nymphea who won the Group One Grosser Preis von Berlin in 2013. In May 2014, Dylan Thomas added two more major successes as Dylan Mouth won the Derby Italiano and Blazing Speed won Hong Kong Champions & Chater Cup. In 2015 Pether's Moon won the Coronation Cup. In 2018, Ladies First won the Auckland Cup.

In 2020 he relocated permanently to Haras Don Alberto in Chile, where he continues to be an active sire. His first Chilean crop born in 2014 included champion filly Penn Rose, who won the 2017 edition of the Group 1 Clásico Las Oaks and graded stakes winners Tavernera, Bicampeon Chileno and Sensa Paura, while his second crop born in 2020 includes multiple listed stakes winner Gigio L'Amico.

== Pedigree ==
Pedigree of Dylan Thomas (IRE), bay stallion 2003
Sire Danehill (USA) 1986	Danzig; 1977	Northern Dancer	Nearctic
Sire Danehill (USA) 1986	Danzig; 1977	Northern Dancer	Natalma*
Sire Danehill (USA) 1986	Danzig; 1977	Pas de Nom	Admiral's Voyage
Sire Danehill (USA) 1986	Danzig; 1977	Pas de Nom	Petitioner
Sire Danehill (USA) 1986	Rayzana; 1981	His Majesty	Ribot
Sire Danehill (USA) 1986	Rayzana; 1981	His Majesty	Flower Bowl
Sire Danehill (USA) 1986	Rayzana; 1981	Spring Adieu	Buckpasser
Sire Danehill (USA) 1986	Rayzana; 1981	Spring Adieu	Natalma*
Dam Lagrion 1989	Diesis; 1980	Sharpen Up	Atan
Dam Lagrion 1989	Diesis; 1980	Sharpen Up	Rocchetta
Dam Lagrion 1989	Diesis; 1980	Doubly Sure	Reliance
Dam Lagrion 1989	Diesis; 1980	Doubly Sure	Soft Angels
Dam Lagrion 1989	Wrap It Up; 1979	Mount Hagen	Bold Bidder
Dam Lagrion 1989	Wrap It Up; 1979	Mount Hagen	Moonmadness
Dam Lagrion 1989	Wrap It Up; 1979	Doc Nan	Francis S
Dam Lagrion 1989	Wrap It Up; 1979	Doc Nan	Betty W (Family: 9-c)

- Like all of Danehill's offspring Dylan Thomas is inbred 4x4 to the mare Natalma. This means that she occurs twice in the fourth generation of his pedigree.
