= Samitar =

British-bred Thoroughbred racehorse

- Sire: Rock of Gibraltar
- Grandsire: Danehill
- Dam: Aileen' Gift
- Damsire: Rainbow Quest
- Sex: Mare
- Foaled: 1 February 2009
- Country: United Kingdom
- Colour: Bay
- Breeder: Norman Court Stud
- Owner: Nick & Olga Dhandsa and John & Zoe Webster; Martin S. Schwartz
- Trainer: Mick Channon; Chad Brown
- Record: 20: 6-4-4
- Earnings: £730,913

Major wins
- Albany Stakes (2011); Tattersalls Millions 2yo Fillies' Trophy (2011); Irish 1,000 Guineas (2012); Garden City Stakes (2012)

Samitar (foaled 1 February 2009) is a British-bred Thoroughbred racehorse and broodmare who raced in four countries and won major races in England, Ireland and the United States. She showed good form as a juvenile in 2011, winning the Albany Stakes at Royal Ascot and a valuable sales race at Newmarket Racecourse as well as being placed in the May Hill Stakes and the Fillies' Mile. In the following year she recorded an upset win in the Irish 1,000 Guineas before being sent to race in North America where she won the Garden City Stakes. She remained in training as a four-year-old and won stakes races at Belmont Park and Saratoga.

== Background ==
Samitar is a bay filly with no white markings bred in England by the Wiltshire-based Norman Court Stud. As a yearling she was consigned to the Tattersalls sale in October 2010 and was bought for 39,000 guineas by the bloodstock agent Gill Richardson. She entered the ownership of Nick & Olga Dhandsa and John & Zoe Webster and was sent into training with Mick Channon at West Ilsley in Berkshire.

Samitar was from the sixth crop of foals sired by Rock of Gibraltar who won seven Group 1 races in a row, including the 2000 Guineas. He went on to sire a number of other top racehorses, including Society Rock, Eagle Mountain, Varenar (Prix de la Forêt) and Mount Nelson. Samitar's dam Aileen's Gift was unraced but produced several other winners including the Albany Stakes winner Nijoom Dubai. She was a granddaughter of Optimistic Lass, who won the Nassau Stakes in 1984 and was the female-line ancestor of Golden Opinion, My Dream Boat and Alice Springs.

== Racing career ==
=== 2011: two-year-old season ===
Samitar was ridden in her first five races by Jamie Spencer. She made her debut in a maiden race over six furlongs at Newmarket Racecourse on 27 May in which she started at odds of 8/1 and finished third of the twelve runners behind Regal Realm. Despite her defeat she was stepped up in class for the Group Three Albany Stakes at Royal Ascot on 17 June and started a 16/1 outsider in a thirteen-runner field headed by the Fillies' Sprint Stakes winner Teolane. After being restrained by Spencer in the early stages she was switched to the left approaching the final furlong, took the lead in the closing stages and won by three quarters of a length from Inetrobil. After the race Channon said "I believed in this filly and this was the plan... The 1,000 Guineas is so far away, but she's a nice filly. I will give her a break and probably bring her back for the backend".

After a break of over two months Samitar returned in the Tattersalls Millions Median Auction Stakes at Newmarket on 27 August ain which she started the 11/10 favourite but was beaten a short head by the colt Mehdi to whom she was conceding one pound in weight. Two weeks later the filly was stepped up in class and distance for the Group Two May Hill Stakes over one mile at Doncaster Racecourse and finished strongly to take third place behind Lyric of Light and Fallen For You. Samitar faced Lyric of Light and Fallen For You again in the Group One Fillies' Mile at Mewmarket on 23 September. After leading for most of the way she was challenged by Lyric of Light and was beaten a head into second place after a sustained struggle over the final furlong. On her final appearance of the season she started the 5/4 favourite for the Tattersalls Millions 2yo Fillies' Trophy (a race for horses sold at Tattersalls) over seven furlongs at Newmarket on 1 October. Ridden by Sam Hitchcott, she tracked the leaders, took the lead approaching the final furlong and stayed on well to win by one and a quarter lengths from Hazel Lavery.

=== 2012: three-year-old season ===
In early 2012 Samitar was bought privately by Martin S. Schwartz. She began her second season by finishing unplaced in another Tattersalls sales race over six furlongs at Newmarket on 18 April and was then sent to France for the Poule d'Essai des Pouliches over 1600 metres at Longchamp Racecourse in which she finished ninth of the thirteen runners behind Beauty Parlour. On 27 May at the Curragh, Samitar was one of eight fillies to contest the Irish 1000 Guineas in which she was ridden by Martin Harley and started at odds of 12/1. Homecoming Queen (horse) started favourite after a nine-length win in the 1000 Guineas while the other runners included La Collina (Phoenix Stakes) and Yellow Rosebud (Derrinstown Stud 1,000 Guineas Trial). After racing in third place behind Homecoming Queen, Samitar took the lead approaching the final furlong and stayed on well to win by one and a half lengths from the 33/1 outsider Ishvana. Her victory gave both her trainer and her jockey their first classic race success. After the race Harley said "It was a big opportunity to be given my first ride in a Classic. The boss has given me a lot of chances and to give me a ride like this in a Classic is unbelievable. She travelled like the winner the whole way". Explaining the filly's poor form in her last two starts Channon said "She didn't run badly [in France] but she made the running and she should have been held up. It was my fault for running her in a sales race at Newmarket before that, I was trying to be clever dropping her back to six furlongs. She needed some decent ground and she's got it now".

On her next appearance Samitar started the 9/2 third favourite for the Coronation Stakes at Royal Ascot. After disputing second place for mot of the way he was outpaced in the closing stages and finished fourth behind Fallen For You. She was then sent to the United States for the Grade II Lake George Stakes over eight and a half furlongs at Saratoga Race Course on 25 July and finished a close third, beaten a neck and a head by Centre Court and Better Lucky. Following the race she was moved permanently to the United States where she was trained by Chad Brown.

On 15 September, Samitar, ridden by Ramon Domínguez, started odds-on favourite for the Grade I Garden City Stakes over nine furlongs at Belmont Park. Her rivals included Karlovy Vary (Ashland Stakes), Tannery (Kilboy Estate Stakes) and Somali Lemonade. Karlovy Vary went to the front and set a steady pace with Samitar settled in fourth place. amitar was switched to the outside entering the straight, took the lead inside the final furlong and held off the late challenge of Somali Lemonade to win by a head. After the race Brown said "She had been training great and blended into our program nicely. She came to me in good shape to begin with. I was happy to see her get a mile and an eighth. That was my one reservation, watching her train and in her races. She has the quality to do it, but I needed to see it, and I saw it today, which is great. Ramon rode a terrific race".

She ended her season in the Queen Elizabeth II Challenge Cup Stakes at Keeneland Racecourse on 13 October in which she finished strongly to take fourth place behind Dayatthespa.

=== 2013: four-year-old season ===
In the spring of 2013 Samitar finished second to Centre Court in both the Honey Fox Handicap at Gulfstream Park and the Jenny Wiley Stakes before running fourth behind her stablemate Pianist when favourite for the Gallorette Handicap at Pimlico Race Course. In the Fairy Garden Stakes at Belmont Park on 4 July she was ridden by Javier Castellano and recorded her first success of the year as she prevailed by one and a quarter lengths from Baffle Me. Later that month she returned to Grade I class in the Diana Handicap at Saratoga Race Course and finished fourth behind Laughing, Dream Peace and Stephanie's Kitten. She was dropped in class for the Speed Boat Stakes at the same track on 1 September and beat Baffle Me by a neck. On her final racecourse appearance eleven days later she started favourite for the Grade III Athenia Stakes at Belmont but finished third behind Pianist and Abaco.

== Pedigree ==
Pedigree of Samitar (GB), bay mare, 2009
| Sire Rock of Gibraltar (IRE) 1999 | Danehill (USA); 1986 | Danzig | Northern Dancer |
| Sire Rock of Gibraltar (IRE) 1999 | Danehill (USA); 1986 | Danzig | Pas de Nom |
| Sire Rock of Gibraltar (IRE) 1999 | Danehill (USA); 1986 | Razyana | His Majesty |
| Sire Rock of Gibraltar (IRE) 1999 | Danehill (USA); 1986 | Razyana | Spring Adieu |
| Sire Rock of Gibraltar (IRE) 1999 | Offshore Boom (IRE); 1985 | Be My Guest | Northern Dancer |
| Sire Rock of Gibraltar (IRE) 1999 | Offshore Boom (IRE); 1985 | Be My Guest | What a Treat |
| Sire Rock of Gibraltar (IRE) 1999 | Offshore Boom (IRE); 1985 | Push a Button | Bold Lad |
| Sire Rock of Gibraltar (IRE) 1999 | Offshore Boom (IRE); 1985 | Push a Button | River Lady |
| Dam Aileen's Gift (IRE) 1998 | Rainbow Quest (USA); 1981 | Blushing Groom | Red God |
| Dam Aileen's Gift (IRE) 1998 | Rainbow Quest (USA); 1981 | Blushing Groom | Runaway Bride |
| Dam Aileen's Gift (IRE) 1998 | Rainbow Quest (USA); 1981 | I Will Follow | Herbager |
| Dam Aileen's Gift (IRE) 1998 | Rainbow Quest (USA); 1981 | I Will Follow | Where You Lead |
| Dam Aileen's Gift (IRE) 1998 | Joyful (IRE); 1992 | Green Desert | Danzig |
| Dam Aileen's Gift (IRE) 1998 | Joyful (IRE); 1992 | Green Desert | Foreign Courier |
| Dam Aileen's Gift (IRE) 1998 | Joyful (IRE); 1992 | Optimistic Lass | Mr. Prospector |
| Dam Aileen's Gift (IRE) 1998 | Joyful (IRE); 1992 | Optimistic Lass | Loveliest (Family: 2-f) |
