= Invermark =

Invermark may mean

- Invermark Castle, a Scottish castle in Angus
- Invermark Lodge, a shooting lodge near the castle
- Invermark (horse), a racehorse named after the lodge
