= Chester Stakes =

Flat horse race in Britain

- Class: Listed
- Location: Chester Racecourse; Chester, Cheshire, England
- Race type: Flat / Thoroughbred
- Sponsor: Virgin Bet
- Website: Chester

Race information
- Distance: 1m 6f 87y (2,896 metres)
- Surface: Turf
- Track: Left-handed
- Qualification: Three-years-old and up
- Weight: 8 st 13 lb (3yo); 9 st 8 lb (4yo+); Allowances; 5 lb for fillies and mares Penalties; 3 lb for Listed winners* 5 lb for Group 3 winners* 7 lb for Group 1 / 2 winners" * after 2024
- Purse: £60,000 (2025); 1st: £34,026

Chester Stakes
2026
Midak	By The Book	Tactician

Previous years
2025
Allonsy	Tabletalk	Alsakib
2024
Absurde	Caius Chorister	Samui
2023
Shanroe	Divine Jewel	Lone Eagle
2022
River Of Stars	Loft	Typewriter
2021
Yesyes	Dancing King	Morando

2020-2011
2020
Spanish Mission	Selino	Hereby
2019
Vivid Diamond	Persian Moon	Outbox
2018
Duretto	Hochfeld	Top Tug
2017
My Reward	Cape Coast	Harlequeen
2016
Muntahaa	Duretto	Fabricate
2015
Gabrial's King	Gabrial's Star	Blue Wave
2014
Big Orange	Whiplash Willie	De Rigueur
2013
Sun Central	Bite Of The Cherry	Handsome Man
2012
Tominator	Communicator	Scrapper Smith
2011
Berling	Tominator	Theology

2010-2001
2010
Lady Eclair	Red Cadeaux	Jedi
2009
Munsef	Mystery Star	Sabotage
2008
Red Gala	Strategic Mount	Cool Judgement
2007
Bauer	Lundy's Lane	Sagredo
2006
New Guinea	Sunday Symphony	Casual Glance
2005
Jagger	Masafi	Light of Morn
2004
Swift Tango	Midas Way	Hambleden
2003
Compton Bolter	Supremacy	Bourgeois
2002
Supremacy	Mesmeric	Scott's View
2001
Flossy	Jalousie	Garden Society

2000-1991
2000
Zaajer	Lightning Arrow	Taufan's Melody
1999
Salmon Ladder	Kadaka	The Glow-Worm
1998
Invermark	Delilah	Perfect Paradigm
1997
Further Flight	Kutta	Grey Shot
1996
Royal Scimitar	Leonato	Snow Princess
1995
Source Of Light	Labibeh	Soba Up
1994
Sadler's Image	Misbelief	Safety In Numbers
1993
Nassma	Azhar	Star Player
1992
Jahafil	Surrealist	Spinning
1991
Arcadian Heights	Secret Waters	Bondstone

1990-1988
1990
Tarikhana	Sesame	Braashee
1989
Nemesia	Lazaz	Upper Strata
1988
Sudden Victory	Grand Tour	Dastur

The Chester Stakes is a Listed flat horse race in Great Britain open to horses aged three years or older. It is run at Chester over a distance of 1 mile, 6 furlongs and 87 yards (2,896 metres), and it is scheduled to take place each year in late August or early September. Prior to 2018 it was run as a handicap. The handicap element was removed in 2018 to comply with a recommendation that no handicap should carry Listed status, and it became a conventional Listed Race.

== Winners ==
=== As a handicap ===
Year	Winner	Age	Weight	Jockey	Trainer	Time
1987	Mountain Kingdom	3	8-05	George Duffield	Clive Brittain	3:22.18
1988	Sudden Victory	4	9-05	Michael Hills	Barry Hills	3:05.25
1989	Nemesia	4	8-13	Willie Carson	Dick Hern	2:54.00
1990	Tarikhana	3	8-01	Paul Eddery	Michael Stoute	2:56.19
1991	Arcadian Heights	3	8-06	Walter Swinburn	Geoff Wragg	2:49.84
1992	Jahafil	4	9-07	Willie Carson	Dick Hern	2:53.63
1993	Nassma	3	8-03	Willie Ryan	James Fanshawe	2:56.77
1994	Sadler's Image	3	8-07	Paul Eddery	Michael Stoute	2:55.42
1995	Source Of Light	6	9-07	David Harrison	Roger Charlton	2:54.40
1996	Royal Scimitar	4	8-12	Richard Quinn	Paul Cole	2:56.80
1997	Further Flight	11	9-01	Michael Hills	Barry Hills	3:07.09
1998	Invermark	4	8-07	Richard Hughes	James Fanshawe	3:00.90
1999	Salmon Ladder	7	8-10	Kieren Fallon	Paul Cole	2:57.34
2000	Zaajer	4	9-07	Richard Hills	Ed Dunlop	2:53.79
2001	Flossy	5	8-07	Robert Winston	Chris Thornton	2:55.04
2002	Supremacy	3	8-06	Kieren Fallon	Sir Michael Stoute	2:51.83
2003	Compton Bolter	6	9-09	Eddie Ahern	Gerard Butler	2:48.98
2004	Swift Tango	4	9-00	Paul Hanagan	Ed Dunlop	3:09.33
2005	Jagger	5	9-07	Darryll Holland	Gerard Butler	2:51.81
2006	New Guinea	3	8-00	M Henry	Michael Jarvis	2:55.07
2007	Bauer	4	9-03	Eddie Ahern	Luca Cumani	2:52.71
2008	Red Gala	5	9-09	Richard Mullen	Sir Michael Stoute	2:49.90
2009	Munsef	7	9-08	Eddie Ahern	Ian Williams	2:51.70
2010	Lady Eclair	4	8-12	Joe Fanning	Mark Johnston	3:01.81
2011	Berling	4	8-13	Phillip Makin	John Dunlop	2:48.77
2012	Tominator	5	9-00	Graham Gibbons	Reg Hollinshead	2:54.34
2013	Sun Central	4	9-11	Seb Sanders	William Haggas	2:54.75
2014	Big Orange	3	8-07	Tom Queally	Michael Bell	2:57.31
2015	Gabrial's King	6	9-01	George Chaloner	Richard Fahey	2:50.20
2016	Muntahaa	3	9-00	Graham Lee	John Gosden	2:50.89
2017	My Reward	5	9-05	David Allan	Tim Easterby	2:54.02

=== As a conditions race ===
Year	Winner	Age	Jockey	Trainer	Time
2018	Duretto	6	David Probert	Andrew Balding	3:02.84
2019	Vivid Diamond	3	Franny Norton	Mark Johnston	3:10.73
2020	Spanish Mission	4	Jamie Spencer	Andrew Balding	3:16.28
2021	Yesyes	3	John Egan	Ralph Beckett	3:12.35
2022	River of Stars	3	John Egan	Ralph Beckett	3:05.45
2023	Shanroe	9	Jason Hart	Karl Thornton	3:11.63
2024	Absurde	6	Daniel Tudhope	Willie Mullins	3:06.41
2025	Allonsy	4	Edward Greatrex	Ralph Beckett	3:08.25

== See also ==
- Horse racing in Great Britain
- List of British flat horse races
