= Penhill (horse) =

British-bred Thoroughbred racehorse (foaled 2011)

- Sire: Mount Nelson
- Grandsire: Rock of Gibraltar
- Dam: Serrenia
- Damsire: High Chaparral
- Sex: Gelding
- Foaled: 16 March 2011
- Country: United Kingdom
- Colour: Bay
- Breeder: Newsells Park Stud & Equity Bloodstock
- Owner: Clarendon Thoroughbred Racing; Tony Bloom
- Trainer: James Bethell; Luca Cumani; Willie Mullins
- Record: 34: 12-6-1
- Earnings: £471,402

Major wins
- Joe Mac Novice Hurdle (2016); Guinness Novice Hurdle (2016); Spa Novices' Hurdle (2017); Stayers' Hurdle (2018)

Penhill (foaled 16 March 2011) is a British-bred racehorse best known for his achievements in National Hunt racing. Racing on the flat in England he showed good form in handicap races, winning five times from eighteen starts. When transferred to Ireland to race over obstacles he was one of the best Novice Hurdlers of the 2016/2017 season, winning six races including the Joe Mac Novice Hurdle, Guinness Novice Hurdle and Spa Novices' Hurdle. His subsequent career was disrupted by chronic injury problems but he recorded his biggest win in March 2018 when he won the Stayers' Hurdle.

== Background ==
Penhill is a bay horse with a narrow white blaze and four white socks bred in England by Newsells Park Stud & Equity Bloodstock. As a yearling, he was offered for sale at Tattersalls in October 2012 and was bought for 24,000 guineas by the trainer, James Bethell. The colt entered the ownership of Clarendon Thoroughbred Racing and was taken into training by Bethell at Middleham Moor, North Yorkshire.

He was sired by Mount Nelson, who won the Critérium International in 2006 and the Eclipse Stakes in 2008. The best of his other offspring was probably the sprinter Librisa Breeze who won the British Champions Sprint Stakes in 2017. Penhills's dam Serrenia was an unraced daughter of the Epsom Derby winner High Chaparral. As a descendant of the American broodmare Evening Belle (foaled 1945), she was a distant relative of Overskate and Brave Anna.

== Racing career ==
=== 2013 Flat season ===
On his racecourse debut, Penhill started a 33/1 outsider for a seven furlong maiden race at Newcastle Racecourse on 27 July and finished sixth of the twelve runners behind Xanthos, beaten eight and three quarter lengths by the winner. He went on to run fifth in similar event at Chester Racecourse in August and twelfth in another maiden at York Racecourse in October. At the end of the season he was gelded.

=== 2014 Flat season ===
As a three-year-old, Penhill was campaigned in handicap races over middle and long distances. After finishing unplaced at Beverley Racecourse on his reappearance he recorded his first event when he took a minor event over ten furlongs at Nottingham Racecourse on 29 April. He went on to finish second and fourth in two races at York before winning again on 15 July, when he won easily from two opponents over one and a half miles at Thirsk Racecourse. He followed up successfully on soft ground at Thirsk Racecourse four days later, taking the lead a furlong out and coming home six lengths clear of the Mark Johnston-trained Notarised. The gelding was then stepped up in class to contest more valuable handicaps and was less successful, finishing sixth at York in August before being well beaten at Ascot Racecourse in September and Newmarket Racecourse in October.

At the end of October 2014 Penhill returned to the sales-ring at Tattersalls and was sold for 230,000 guineas to Stephen Hillen Bloodstock.

=== 2015 Flat season ===
For the 2015 season, Penhill was trained by Luca Cumani in Newmarket and raced in the blue and white colours of Tony Bloom.

On his first appearance of 2015 Penhill started 13/8 favourite for a handicap over one and a half miles at Ascot on 9 May and held off a strong late challenge from New Years's Night to prevail by a short head. Later that month he finished seventh when favourite for a similar event at Newmarket. He went on to run fourth in the Old Newton Cup in July and second in a handicap at Pontefract Racecourse in August. In a handicap at Haydock Park on 3 September the gelding started 9/4 favourite and took the lead at half way before repelling the challenge of Buonarotti to win by half a length. Penhill ended his season by running sixth in a handicap at Doncaster Racecourse on 7 November.

=== 2016/17 National Hunt season ===
At the end of the 2015 flat season Penhill was sent Ireland to join the National Hunt stable of Willie Mullins at Bagenalstown, County Carlow. In the 2016/17 National Hunt season the gelding was campaigned in Novice Hurdle races. On his first run for his new trainer, Penhill started odds-on favourite for a minor event over two miles at Tramore Racecourse on 4 May and won easily by a length and a half after taking the lead on the run-in. He ran poorly when he broke a blood vessel in a novice hurdle at Killarney Racecourse on 14 July but returned to winning form twelve days later at Galway Races when he jumped poorly but produced a strong late run to win by half a length from his stablemate Master of Verse.

Penhill began his autumn campaign at Listowel Racecourse on 17 September when he was ridden by Ruby Walsh and won bu seven lengths from his stablemate Bel Sas after taking the lead between the last two obstacles. Two weeks later the gelding was stepped up in class and started favourite for the Grade 3 Joe Mac Novice Hurdle at Tipperary Racecourse. With Walsh again in the saddle he jumped poorly in the early stages but overtook the Henry de Bromhead-trained Balzac Turgot two flights from the finish and drew away on the run-in to win by four and a half lengths. After the race Walsh said "He was quite deliberate over the first two but got better as he went on... Other than Killarney he has done everything right... He keeps improving though and I imagine he'll keep going until he tells us otherwise.

On 4 December Penhill was moved up to Grade 1 class for the Royal Bond Novice Hurdle over two miles at Fairyhouse and came home fourth behind Airlie Beach, Saturnas and Le Martalin after being badly hampered at the second last. He was then moved up in distance for the Grade 1 Guinness Novice Hurdle over three miles at Limerick Racecourse on 29 December and started the 3/1 third choice in the betting behind Rathnure Rebel (winner of the Cork Stayers Novice Hurdle) and Livelovelaugh. Ridden by Paul Townend, Penhill raced towards the rear of the five-runner field before moving up to take the lead at the second last before pulling away to win "easily" by seven lengths from Call The Taxie. Townend commented "I thought we went a good gallop and he jumped okay but I suppose the step up to three miles helped him. It helps him sort himself out but still galloped into one or two. There was a question mark whether he'd get the trip coming here but he got it well and I don't think we hung around."

On 17 September, Penhill returned to his native England and went off a 16/1 outsider for the Grade 1 Albert Bartlett Novices' Hurdle over three miles at Cheltenham Racecourse on 17 March. The Slaney Novice Hurdle winner Death Duty started favourite while the other thirteen runners included Augusta Kate, Wholestone (Bristol Novices' Hurdle), Monalee (Mercedes-Benz Novice Hurdle), The World's End (Prestige Novices' Hurdle) and Constantine Bay (River Don Novices' Hurdle). After being restrained by Townend in the early stages he moved into contention in the last half-mile and recovered from being hampered at the penultimate obstacle to take the lead from Monalee approaching the final flight. He pulled away on the run-in to win by three and a half lengths from Monalee with a gap of four lengths back to Wholestone in third. Tony Bloom said "I'm over the moon for everyone involved, it was a great ride by Paul and it's a brilliant horse we have here. He was looking good all the way and two out we were expecting him to win, his hurdling was a lot better than it has been and he's got the pace. Racing over three miles has been the making of him, as it gives him more time for his jumping. I haven't had many Cheltenham runners, so it is very exciting. I've brought a lot of friends and they're all on at 16 and 20-1."

Walsh took the ride when Penhill started the 2/1 favourite for the Grade 1 Irish Daily Mirror Novice Hurdle at Punchestown on 26 April and finished second to the Gordon Elliott-trained outside Champagne Classic.

=== 2017/18 National Hunt season ===
After an absence of almost eleven months, Penhill returned to the track to contest the Grade 1 Stayers' Hurdle at Cheltenham on 15 March 2018 in which he was ridden by Townend and started at odds of 12/1. The Long Walk Hurdle winner Sam Spinner started favourite while the other thirteen runners included Supasundae (Irish Champion Hurdle), Yanworth (Liverpool Hurdle), Unowhatimeanharry (Champion Stayers Hurdle), L'Ami Serge (Grande Course de Haies d'Auteuil), The Worlds End, Augusta Kate and The New One. After racing at the rear of the field for most of the way, Penhill moved up on the outside to dispute the lead at the second last flight of hurdles. He gained the advantage approaching the final obstacle and saw off a sustained challenge from Supasundae to win by two lengths. Paul Townend said: "He's got a massive engine. It was some training performance. I got there too soon and luckily he kept going. He jumped rusty enough early on but when I needed him at the last he produced."

For his second and final run of the season, Penhill started 2/1 favourite for the Champion Stayers Hurdle at Punchestown on 26 April when he ran second to the front-running Faugheen.

Penhill was trained for the 2019 Stayers' Hurdle but two weeks before the race he was withdrawn from the contest after being found to be "very sore" following a preparatory gallop.

=== 2019/20 National Hunt season ===
After an absence of over nineteen months Penhill returned to the track at Fairyhouse in December 2019 and came home last of the six runners behind Honeysuckle in the Hatton's Grace Hurdle. Later that month he finished third behind Apple's Jade and Unowhatimeanharry in the Christmas Hurdle at Leopardstown Racecourse. In January he finished second to the French-bred mare Benie des Dieux in the Grade 2 Galmoy Hurdle at Gowran Park although the details of the race where hard to establish as it was run in thick fog. He produced arguably his best run of the season at Navan Racecourse in February when he was a four-length runner-up to Cracking Smart in the Boyne Hurdle with Tiger Roll finishing fifth. At Cheltenham on 12 March the gelding started the 10/1 joint third choice in the betting as he attempted to regain his Stayers' Hurdle title but went lame after the third flight and was pulled up by Townend.

== Pedigree ==
Pedigree of Penhill, bay gelding, 2011
Sire Mount Nelson (GB) 2004	Rock of Gibraltar (IRE); 1999	Danehill (USA)	Danzig
Sire Mount Nelson (GB) 2004	Rock of Gibraltar (IRE); 1999	Danehill (USA)	Razyana
Sire Mount Nelson (GB) 2004	Rock of Gibraltar (IRE); 1999	Offshore Boom	Be My Guest (USA)
Sire Mount Nelson (GB) 2004	Rock of Gibraltar (IRE); 1999	Offshore Boom	Push A Button
Sire Mount Nelson (GB) 2004	Independence (GB); 1998	Selkirk (USA)	Sharpen Up (GB)
Sire Mount Nelson (GB) 2004	Independence (GB); 1998	Selkirk (USA)	Annie Edge (IRE)
Sire Mount Nelson (GB) 2004	Independence (GB); 1998	Yukon Hope (USA)	Forty Niner
Sire Mount Nelson (GB) 2004	Independence (GB); 1998	Yukon Hope (USA)	Sahara Forest (GB)
Dam Serrenia (IRE) 2005	High Chaparral (IRE); 1999	Sadler's Wells (USA)	Northern Dancer (CAN)
Dam Serrenia (IRE) 2005	High Chaparral (IRE); 1999	Sadler's Wells (USA)	Fairy Bridge
Dam Serrenia (IRE) 2005	High Chaparral (IRE); 1999	Kasora	Darshaan (GB)
Dam Serrenia (IRE) 2005	High Chaparral (IRE); 1999	Kasora	Kozana (GB)
Dam Serrenia (IRE) 2005	Helvellyn (USA); 1990	Gone West	Mr. Prospector
Dam Serrenia (IRE) 2005	Helvellyn (USA); 1990	Gone West	Secrettame
Dam Serrenia (IRE) 2005	Helvellyn (USA); 1990	Accredied	Alleged
Dam Serrenia (IRE) 2005	Helvellyn (USA); 1990	Accredied	Belle de Nuit (Family: 22-b)
