= Arcadian Heights =

British-bred Thoroughbred racehorse

- Sire: Shirley Heights
- Grandsire: Mill Reef
- Dam: Miss Longchamp
- Damsire: Northfields
- Sex: Gelding
- Foaled: 14 April 1988
- Country: United Kingdom
- Colour: Bay
- Breeder: John Pearce
- Owner: John Pearce
- Trainer: Geoff Wragg
- Record: 23: 4-4-5
- Earnings: £241,952

Major wins
- Chester Stakes (1991); Ascot Gold Cup (1994); Doncaster Cup (1994)

Arcadian Heights (14 April 1988 – after 2011) was a British Thoroughbred racehorse who recorded his biggest win in the 1994 Ascot Gold Cup. He was unraced as a two-year-old but developed into a useful stayer as a three-year-old when he won the Chester Stakes, finished second in the March Stakes and ran prominently for a long way in the St Leger. In 1992 he failed to win but ran well to take second place in the Ormonde Stakes, Henry II Stakes and Ascot Gold Cup. His prospects however became compromised by his difficult and aggressive temperament as he attempted to attack other horses during his races. An attempt to curb his behaviour by fitting him with a muzzle was only partially successful and he was gelded before the end of the year.

As a five-year-old in 1993 he was better-behaved but less successful although he did finish third in the Goodwood Cup. He reached his peak in 1994, his final season of racing, when he defeated the Melbourne Cup winner Vintage Crop to win the Ascot Gold Cup at the third attempt. He was also placed in the Sagaro Stakes, Goodwood Cup and Prix Kergorlay before ending his racing career with a win in the Doncaster Cup. Arcadian Heights remained a difficult horse to manage in his retirement, and special measures had to be taken to protect other horses and stable staff.

== Background ==
Arcadian Heights was a bay horse bred in England by his owner John Pearce. He was trained throughout his racing career by Geoff Wragg at the Abington Place stable in Newmarket, Suffolk.

Arcadian Heights was from the ninth crop of foals sired by Shirley Heights who won The Derby and the Irish Derby in 1978, before becoming a very successful breeding stallion who sired many good winners including Slip Anchor and Darshaan. Arcadian Heights' dam Miss Longchamp showed some ability as a racehorse, winning two races in England as a three-year-old in the summer of 1982. She was a half-sister of the Premio Vittorio di Capua winner Paris-Turf and, as a descendant of Polish Star, a relative of the leading Australian performers Stormy Rex (VRC Derby) and Sheraco (AJC Oaks).

== Racing career ==
=== 1991: three-year-old season ===
Arcadian Heights did not race as a two-year-old and began his racing career in May 1991 when he finished seventh in a maiden race over one and a half miles at Newmarket Racecourse. In a similar event over fourteen furlongs at Yarmouth Racecourse on 4 June he finished third behind Sought Out and Jendali, horses who went on to win the Prix du Cadran and the Queen's Vase respectively. Later that month he started at odds of 8/1 in a four-runner maiden over fifteen furlongs at Newmarket and recorded his first success as he led from the start and won by three lengths from the Henry Cecil-trained Shelegai.

After a break of almost two months Arcadian Heights was moved up in class for the Listed March Stakes at Goodwood Racecourse on 24 August. He raced in second place for most of the way and finished runner-up to the Dick Hern-trained Jahafil. Seven days later the colt was matched against older horses in the Chester Stakes over thirteen furlongs at Chester Racecourse and started the 5/2 joint-favourite alongside the Henry Cecil-trained four-year-old Bondstone. Ridden by Walter Swinburn (who became his regular jockey) he led from the start, accelerated clear of the field and won by three lengths from the filly Secret Waters. On 14 September Arcadian Heights was one of ten three-year-olds to contest the 215th running of the St Leger Stakes over fourteen and a half furlongs at Doncaster Racecourse. Starting at odds of 12/1 he was amongst the leaders from the start and went to the front approaching the final turn but faded in the straight to finish eighth behind Toulon.

=== 1992: four-year-old season ===
On his first appearance of 1992 Arcadian Heights finished fourth to Luchiroverte in the Doncaster Shield over one and a half miles on 19 March after leading for most of the way. In this race he showed signs of his aggressive temperament as he bit Luchiroverte when he was overtaken a furlong from the finish. In his next two races he finished eighth behind Al Mutahm in the Sagaro Stakes at Ascot Racecourse in April and second, beaten ten lengths by Saddlers' Hall in the Ormonde Stakes at Chester on 7 May. In the Henry II Stakes at Sandown Park Racecourse sixteen days later he started a 25/1 outsider but recovered from being hampered half a mile from the finish to finish second of the eight runners behind Drum Taps. In the Ascot Gold Cup Arcadian Heights started the 11/2 fourth choice behind Drum Taps, Endoli and Turgeon in a six-runner field. After turning into the straight in fourth place he ran on in the closing stages to finish second behind Drum Taps. In what appeared to be a repeat of his antics at Doncaster, Arcaidian Heights lunged aggressively at Drum Taps early in the straight and was ordered to wear a muzzle in subsequent races. Geoff Wragg said "He is a bit yappy but he's not vicious. He just reacts like any other horse if you intimidate or annoy him". On his final appearance of the season Arcadian Heights finished fourth behind Further Flight in the Goodwood Cup on 30 July.

Arcadian Heights became increasingly unhappy with his muzzle and it was decided to geld him to preserve his future as a racehorse.

=== 1993: five-year-old season ===
After an absence of ten months, Arcadian Heights returned in the Henry II Stakes on 31 May 1993 and finished fifth behind the John Gosden-trained Brier Creek. On his second appearance in the Ascot Gold Cup on 17 June he finished fifth behind Drum Taps, Assessor, Turgeon and Sought Out. Frankie Dettori took over from Swinburn and partnered the gelding in his three subsequent races in 1993. In the Goodwood Cup he briefly led in the straight before finishing third behind Sonus and Assessor. Arcadian Heights finished forty lengths behind Further Flight when running seventh in the Lonsdale Stakes at York Racecourse in August. He ended his season in the Jockey Club Cup at Newmarket in October when he finished fifth of the six runners behind Further Flight.

=== 1994: six-year-old season ===
Arcadian Heights began his 1994 campaign in the Sagaro Stakes at Ascot on 27 April in which he started a 20/1 outsider and finished third of the thirteen runners behind Safety In Numbers and the favoured Cairo Prince. The American jockey Cash Asmussen took the ride when the gelding contested the Henry II Stakes at Sandown on 30 May and finished sixth behind the John Dunlop-trained My Patriarch. Arcadian Heights was ridden by Michael Hills when he made his third appearance in the Gold Cup at Royal Ascot on 16 June and started a 20/1 outsider in a nine-runner field. The prize looked likely to go abroad as the great Irish stayer Vintage Crop, winner of the Melbourne Cup started favourite with the French-trained challenger Raintrap also strongly-fancied. The other six runners were My Patriarch, Safety In Numbers, Sonus and the leading National Hunt performers Morley Street, Oh So Risky (twice runner-up in the Champion Hurdle) and Corrouge (Scottish Champion Hurdle). Arcadian Heights took the lead from the start and set the pace before giving way to My Patriarch a mile from the finish but rallied to regain the advantage approaching the final turn. He held off a sustained challenge from Vintage Crop in the last quarter mile to win by three quarters of a length with a gap of seven lengths back to Sous in third place.

On his third appearance in the Goodwood Cup Arcadian Heights carried top weight of 133 pounds and finished third in a close finish, beaten just over a length by the winner Tioman Island with My Patriarch and Further Flight unplaced. In August he was sent to France for the Prix Kengorlay over 3000 metres at Deauville Racecourse. Carrying 136 pounds he again finished a close third, beaten three quarters of a length and the same by Molesnes and Epaphos. Arcadian Heights ended his racing career in the Doncaster Cup in which he started the 7/2 favourite under top weight of 133. My Patriarch and Further Flight were again in opposition whilst the other fancied runners included Cuff Link (Queen Alexandra Stakes), Quick Ransom (Northumberland Plate) and Edbaysaan (third in the 1993 St Leger). Frankie Dettori sent the gelding into the lead from the start and Arcadian Heights ended his career with a victory as he quickened three furlongs out and stayed on well in the closing stages to win by one and a quarter lengths from Quick Ransom.

== Retirement ==
At the end of his racing career, Arcadian Heights was sent to the Brick Kiln Farm, a retirement facility for former racehorses at Heveningham, Suffolk operated by Diane and Colin Cooper. In 2011 he was reported to be in good health but had lost none of his temper: Diane Cooper commented "Arcadian is fine with mares and he used to be brilliant at weaning time when we had foals, but put him in with another gelding and he'll bite, kick, both at the same time; he's very vicious". A veterinary surgeon who administered an injection to the gelding narrowly escaped injury when he was attacked by Arcadian Heights on returning to the yard: the safety of the farrier who shoed Arcadian Heights was preserved by distracting the horse with carrots during the procedure. Cooper added that "We know what he's like and never give him the chance to get us. We never take our eyes off him if we're near him".

== Assessment and awards ==
In their book A Century of Champions, based on a modified version of the Timeform system, John Randall and Tony Morris rated Arcadian Heights as a "poor" Gold Cup winner.

== Pedigree ==
Pedigree of Arcadian Heights, bay gelding, 1988
Sire Shirley Heights (GB) 1975	Mill Reef (USA); 1968	Never Bend	Nasrullah
Sire Shirley Heights (GB) 1975	Mill Reef (USA); 1968	Never Bend	Lalun
Sire Shirley Heights (GB) 1975	Mill Reef (USA); 1968	Milan Mill	Princequillo
Sire Shirley Heights (GB) 1975	Mill Reef (USA); 1968	Milan Mill	Virginia Water
Sire Shirley Heights (GB) 1975	Hardiemma (GB); 1969	Hardicanute	Hard Ridden
Sire Shirley Heights (GB) 1975	Hardiemma (GB); 1969	Hardicanute	Harvest Maid
Sire Shirley Heights (GB) 1975	Hardiemma (GB); 1969	Grand Cross	Grandmaster
Sire Shirley Heights (GB) 1975	Hardiemma (GB); 1969	Grand Cross	Blue Cross
Dam Miss Longchamp (IRE) 1979	Northfields (USA); 1968	Northern Dancer	Nearctic
Dam Miss Longchamp (IRE) 1979	Northfields (USA); 1968	Northern Dancer	Natalma
Dam Miss Longchamp (IRE) 1979	Northfields (USA); 1968	Little Hut	Occupy
Dam Miss Longchamp (IRE) 1979	Northfields (USA); 1968	Little Hut	Savage Beauty
Dam Miss Longchamp (IRE) 1979	Miss Paris (GB); 1969	Sovereign Path	Grey Sovereign
Dam Miss Longchamp (IRE) 1979	Miss Paris (GB); 1969	Sovereign Path	Mountain Path
Dam Miss Longchamp (IRE) 1979	Miss Paris (GB); 1969	Belle Affaire	Elopement
Dam Miss Longchamp (IRE) 1979	Miss Paris (GB); 1969	Belle Affaire	V C (Family 8-k)
