= Invermark (horse) =

British-bred Thoroughbred racehorse

- Sire: Machiavellian
- Grandsire: Mr. Prospector
- Dam: Applecross
- Damsire: Glint of Gold
- Sex: Gelding
- Foaled: 20 February 1994
- Country: United Kingdom
- Colour: Bay
- Breeder: Sir David Wills
- Owner: Sir David Wills; Lady Wills
- Trainer: James Fanshawe
- Record: 49: 12-7-4
- Earnings: £187,085

Major wins
- Chester Stakes (1998); Prix du Cadran (1998)

Invermark (20 February 1994 – after 2002) was a British Thoroughbred racehorse who excelled over extended distances. He showed modest ability in his early career and won only one minor race in his first two seasons. In 1998 however he made rapid progress as he took a minor event at Haydock Park before winning the Chester Stakes and then recording his biggest success in the Group 1 Prix du Cadran. In the following year he failed to win but arguably reached his peak with a second place in a very strong renewal of the Ascot Gold Cup and also finished placed in the Chester Cup and Prix Kergorlay. After being sidelined by injury for almost two years he returned to the track as a seven-year-old in 2001 to win another minor race at Haydock before running second in the Jockey Club Cup. The highlight of his final active season was a second place in the Henry II Stakes.

== Background ==
Invermark was a dark bay or brown horse bred in England owned and bred by Sir David Wills. A member of the Wills family of tobacco merchants Sir David established the Ditchley Foundation and was described as "one of the greatest but least-known benefactors of the post-war era". Invermark was trained throughout his racing career by James Fanshawe at the Pegasus Stable at Newmarket, Suffolk. Wills was an enthusiastic follower of field sports and Invermark was named after Invermark Lodge in Angus, Scotland.

He was sired by Machiavellian, an American-bred, French-trained racehorse who was one of the leading European two-year-olds of his generation, winning the Prix Morny and the Prix de la Salamandre in 1989. He later became a very successful breeding stallion, siring leading winners including Almutawakel, Street Cry, Medicean and Storming Home. Invermark's dam Applecross showed good form in a brief racing career, winning three of her six races and finishing second in both the Park Hill Stakes and the Princess Royal Stakes. She produced several other winners including Craigsteel (Princess of Wales's Stakes) and Inchrory (Stockholm Cup International). She was descended from Alassio, a half-sister to both Royal Charger and the influential broodmare Tessa Gillian.

== Racing career ==
=== Early career ===
Invermark began his racing career by finishing eighth in a maiden race over seven furlongs at Newbury Racecourse on 17 August 1996. He showed some progress in two similar events before the end of the year, running fifth at Thirsk in September and third at Yarmouth in October.

The colt began his second campaign by coming home twelfth in a minor handicap race at Newmarket Racecourse in May and was gelded shortly afterwards. After recovering from the operation Invermark returned in a maiden over 11 1/2 furlongs at Yarmouth on 22 July and started at odds of 8/1 in an eight-runner field. Ridden by Michael Hills he recorded his first success as he took the lead three furlongs out and prevailed in a tight finish by a head from the Henry Cecil-trained favourite Awesome Wells. He then returned to handicap races, finishing fifth at Newmarket in August and second at Haydock Park in September. On his final run of the year he came home fourth behind Sabadilla in the November Handicap at Doncaster.

=== 1998: four-year-old season ===
On his first two appearances of 1998 Invermark came home sixth in handicaps at Newmarket and Sandown Park in April. He produced a better effort when finishing runner-up at Doncaster in June and then started odds-on favourite when carrying 140 pounds in a minor handicap over fourteen furlongs at Haydock on 3 July. Ridden by Walter Swinburn he took the lead in the last quarter mile and drew right away from his opponents to win by seven lengths. Richard Hughes took the ride when the gelding contested a more prestigious handicap, the Listed Chester Stakes over 13 1/2 furlongs at Chester Racecourse in August and started at odds of 8/1. After being restrained in the early stages he moved into contention in the last half mile and took the lead a furlong out. Invermark pulled clear in the closing stages to win by 3 1/2 lengths from the filly Delilah (Princess Royal Stakes) with the favourite Perfect Paradigm (Old Newton Cup) in third.

Invermark was moved up significantly in class when he was sent to France for the Group 3 Prix Gladiateur over 3100 metres on very soft ground at Longchamp Racecourse on 6 September. Ridden by the locally based Olivier Peslier he led for most of the way before being overtaken in the closing stages and finishing fourth behind Tiraaz, Solo Mio and Asolo, beaten two lengths by the winner. Hughes was back in the saddle when the gelding returned to Longchamp for the Group 1 Prix du Cadran over 4000 metres on 3 October and started an 18.7/1 outsider. Tiraaz was made favourite, while the other seven runners included San Sebastian, Asolo, Canon Can (Doncaster Cup) and Three Cheers (Prix de Lutèce). Invermark raced towards the rear of the field as Canon Can set the pace, before being switched to the outside and making rapid progress in the straight. Tiraaz went to the front but Invermark overhauled the favourite in the last 100 metres and won by half a length, with the pair finishing four lengths clear of San Sebastian in third. Richard Hughes said "When I won on him at Chester the time before I sat last on him for most of the way and he never came off the bridle. He's not really quirky, but he's still a bit green and he's happier settled behind. As soon as I went past the other horse today he almost started pulling up. It would be a nightmare to go the whole way in front on him and I couldn't quite figure out what they were doing [in the Prix Gladiateur] last time".

Three weeks later the gelding ended his season with another run at Longchamp but failed to reproduce his best form and came home last of the seven starters behind Tiraaz.

=== 1999: five-year-old season ===
Invermark began his fourth campaign by finishing third under top weight of 136 pounds in the Chester Cup over 2 1/4 miles on 5 May. On 17 June the gelding produced what was probably his best performance in the Gold Cup over 2 1/2 miles at Royal Ascot. Ridden by Hughes he raced towards the rear before producing a strong late run and taking second place behind Enzeli in a field which also included Kayf Tara, Celeric, Nedawi and Persian Punch. Invermark returned to France for his last two races that year. In the Prix Kergorlay at Deauville Racecourse in August he stayed on well in the straight but proved no match for Kayf Tara and was beaten five lengths into second place. In October he attempted to repeat his 1998 victory in the Prix du Cadran but came home fourth behind Tajoun, San Sebastian and Divination.

After the death of David Wills in December 1999 the ownership of Invermark passed to his widow Lady Wills (formerly Eva Kavanaugh).

=== Later career ===
Invermark was off the track for the whole of the 2000 season after sustaining a serious suspensory ligament injury.

After an absence of nearly two years Invermark returned for a minor event over 1 3/4 miles at Haydock on 28 September 2001 and started at odds of 8/1 in a twelve-runner field. Ridden by Hughes he produced a sustained run in the straight, took the lead inside the final furlong and won by a neck from Murghem. On his only other appearance of the year he started 2/1 favourite for the Jockey Club Cup at Newmarket on 20 October and finished a close second to the three-year-old Capal Garmon, with Royal Rebel and San Sebastian in third and fourth.

Invermark returned as an eight-year-old and was ridden by Michael Hills in all three of his races. He ran fourth to Give Notice in the Sagaro Stakes at Ascot in May and then finished a close second to Akbar in the Henry II Stakes at Sandown. On his final racecourse appearance the gelding ran for the second time in the Ascot Gold Cup and came home seventh of the fifteen runners behind Royal Rebel.

== Pedigree ==
Pedigree of Invermark (GB), bay gelding, 1994
Sire Machiavellian (USA) 1987	Mr. Prospector; 1970	Raise a Native	Native Dancer
Sire Machiavellian (USA) 1987	Mr. Prospector; 1970	Raise a Native	Raise You
Sire Machiavellian (USA) 1987	Mr. Prospector; 1970	Gold Digger	Nashua
Sire Machiavellian (USA) 1987	Mr. Prospector; 1970	Gold Digger	Sequence
Sire Machiavellian (USA) 1987	Coup de Folie; 1982	Halo	Hail To Reason
Sire Machiavellian (USA) 1987	Coup de Folie; 1982	Halo	Cosmah
Sire Machiavellian (USA) 1987	Coup de Folie; 1982	Raise The Standard (CAN)	Hoist The Flag (USA)
Sire Machiavellian (USA) 1987	Coup de Folie; 1982	Raise The Standard (CAN)	Natalma (USA)
Dam Applecross (GB) 1987	Glint of Gold; 1978	Mill Reef (USA)	Never Bend
Dam Applecross (GB) 1987	Glint of Gold; 1978	Mill Reef (USA)	Milan Mill
Dam Applecross (GB) 1987	Glint of Gold; 1978	Crown Treasure (USA)	Graustark
Dam Applecross (GB) 1987	Glint of Gold; 1978	Crown Treasure (USA)	Treasure Chest
Dam Applecross (GB) 1987	Rhynecra; 1981	Blakeney	Hethersett
Dam Applecross (GB) 1987	Rhynecra; 1981	Blakeney	Windmill Girl
Dam Applecross (GB) 1987	Rhynecra; 1981	Marypark	Charlottown
Dam Applecross (GB) 1987	Rhynecra; 1981	Marypark	Margaret Ann (Family: 9-c)
