= Martin Harley (jockey) =

Irish jockey

Personal information
- Born: 19 July 1989 (age 37) County Donegal, Ireland
- Occupation: Jockey

Horse racing career
- Sport: Horse racing

Major racing wins
- Major races J.J. Atkins (2025); King's Stand Stakes (2015); Irish 1,000 Guineas (2012); Prix de l'Abbaye (2015); Prix Royal Oak (2013)

Significant horses
- Goldream, Samitar, Sheikhzayedroad, Tac De Boistron

Martin Harley (born 19 July 1989 in County Donegal, Ireland) is a Group 1 winning Irish jockey.

== Career ==
Harley had spells as stable jockey for Mick Channon and Marco Botti, before turning freelance. His first Group 1 victory was for Channon on Samitar in the Irish 1,000 Guineas in May 2012. For Botti, he won the Prix Royal Oak the following year on Tac De Boistron, which helped him to a yearly prize money total of over £1 million for the first time.

His breakthrough triumph was the 2015 King's Stand Stakes at Royal Ascot, on the Robert Cowell-trained Goldream. He won by a short head. He won the Prix de l'Abbaye with another narrow victory on the same horse later in the season.

In March 2014, in a minor race at Lingfield, he clipped the heels of a rival on Red Art, and was catapulted into the ground, at almost 40 mph. He suffered a broken neck and several broken ribs in an injury that was considered potentially career-ending.

In 2016, he built a successful partnership with stayer Sheikhzayedroad, winning three group races, including the Doncaster Cup and British Champions Long Distance Cup.

== Statistics ==
Flat wins in Great Britain by year

Year	Wins	Runs	Strike rate	Total earnings
2007	0	1	0	—
2008	1	9	11	£4,533
2009	0	1	0	—
2010	1	4	25	£10,101
2011	67	530	13	£277,986
2012	74	656	11	£723,350
2013	103	788	13	£1,109,828
2014	79	579	14	£923,531
2015	83	685	12	£1,221,202
2016	76	602	13	£1,289,534
2017 (Note: to 25 Oct)	57	492	12	£835,623

== Major wins ==
(United Kingdom) Great Britain

- King's Stand Stakes - Goldream (2015)

(Republic of Ireland) Ireland

- Irish 1,000 Guineas - Samitar (2012)

France

- Prix de l'Abbaye - Goldream (2015)
- Prix Royal Oak - Tac De Boistron (2013)
