= Big Orange (horse) =

British-bred Thoroughbred racehorse

- Sire: Duke of Marmalade
- Grandsire: Danehill
- Dam: Miss Brown To You
- Damsire: Fasliyev
- Sex: Gelding
- Foaled: 14 February 2011
- Country: United Kingdom
- Colour: Bay
- Breeder: Stetchworth & Middle Park Studs
- Owner: Bill Gredley
- Trainer: Michael Bell
- Record: 27: 9-3-2
- Earnings: £1,255,031

Major wins
- Chester Stakes (2014); Noel Murless Stakes (2014); Princess of Wales's Stakes (2015, 2016); Goodwood Cup (2015, 2016); Henry II Stakes (2017); Ascot Gold Cup (2017)

Big Orange (foaled 14 February 2011) is a British Thoroughbred racehorse. After failing to win a two-year-old he made good progress in 2014, winning three of his six races including the Chester Stakes and Noel Murless Stakes. He emerged a top class performer in the following year, winning the Princess of Wales's Stakes and the Goodwood Cup and took the same two races in 2016. In 2017 he won the Henry II Stakes and then recorded his biggest win in the Ascot Gold Cup.

== Background ==
Big Orange is a bay gelding with a very small white star bred by his owner Bill Gredley at his Stetchworth Stud near Newmarket, Suffolk. Big Orange was gelded as a yearling and sent into training with Michael Bell at Newmarket.

He was from the second crop of foals sired by Duke of Marmalade who won the Prix Ganay, Tattersalls Gold Cup, Prince of Wales's Stakes, King George VI and Queen Elizabeth Stakes and International Stakes in 2008. His other progeny have included Simple Verse and Star of Seville (Prix de Diane). Big Orange's dam Miss Brown To You showed modest racing ability, winning one minor race from six starts. As a granddaughter of Al Bahathri she was closely related to Military Attack, Haafhd, Gladiatorus and Red Cadeaux.

== Racing career ==
=== 2013: two-year-old season ===
Big Orange ran twice as a two-year-old, finishing fourth in a maiden race over nine furlongs at Goodwood Racecourse on 13 October and sixth in a similar event over one mile at Newmarket Racecourse ten days later.

=== 2014: three-year-old season ===
On his first run as a three-year-old Big Orange started at odds of 10/1 for a maiden over eleven furlongs on the polytrack at Kempton Park Racecourse and finished second to Romsdal (a colt who went on to finish third in the Epsom Derby). On the polytrack at Lingfield Park on 29 April the gelding started favourite for a ten furlong maiden and recorded his first success a he led from the start and won by one and a half lengths from Royal Warranty. In June Big Orange was steppedupin class to contest the Listed Queen's Vase at Royal Ascot in which he started a 33/1 outsider and came home fourth of the ten runners, beaten just over three lengths by the winner Hartnell.

After a two-month break, Big Orange returned to the track at Chester Racecourse in August and was matched against older horses in the Chester Stakes, a Listed handicap race in which he carried a weight of 120 pounds. Ridden by Tom Queally he led from the start, went clear of his rivals approaching the final furlong, and held on to win by one and a quarter lengths from the six-year-old Whiplash Willie. At Ascot on 3 October the gelding started 100/30 third choice in the betting in a six-runner field for the Listed Noel Murless Stakes. With Queally again in the saddle he took the lead in the straight and "battled on" to win in a three-way photo-finish from Marzocco and Mizzou. For his final run of the season Big Orange was stepped up to Group 2 class for the British Champions Long Distance Cup on heavy ground at Ascot in which he led the field into the straight but then faded and finished fifth behind Forgotten Rules.

=== 2015: four-year-old season ===
In his first two starts of 2015 Big Orange proved no match for the seven-year-old gelding Clever Cookie, finishing fourth in the Ormonde Stakes at Chester and seventh in the Grand Cup at York. On 9 July Big Orange started the 25/1 outsider in an eight-runner field for the Princess of Wales's Stakes over one and a half miles on good-to-firm ground at Newmarket. The Wolferton Stakes winner Mahsoob started favourite while the other runners included Gospel Choir (Yorkshire Cup) Second Step (Jockey Club Stakes), Hillstar (Canadian International Stakes) and Sheikhzayedroad (Northern Dancer Turf Stakes). Ridden by Jamie Spencer, Big Orange led from the start and rallied after being overtaken a furlong out to win by half a length and a head from Second Step and Gospel Choir. After the race, Jamie Spencer said "We were tilting at windmills a bit looking at the form, but when a horse is telling the trainer he's happy, you've got to take a chance and it's worked out. We went a nice, even gallop and when the others came at him he just kept stretching, stretching".

Three weeks after his win at Newmarket Big Orange was stepped up in distance to contest the Goodwood Cup over two miles and started the 6/1 fourth choice in the betting behind Quest For More (Northumberland Plate), Trip To Paris and Pallasator (Jockey Club Rose Bowl). He took the early lead and then settled in second place behind Vive Ma Fille before regaining the advantage approaching the final furlong. He was overtaken by Quest For More in the closing stages but rallied in the final strides and won by a neck with Trip To Paris a short head away in third place. Spencer commented "He's very tough and honest and loves this ground. He can only get stronger as the year goes on".

On his next appearance, in the Lonsdale Cup at York in August Big Orange led race until the last three furlongs but dropped from contention in the last quarter mile and came home seventh of the eight runners behind the Irish-trained Max Dynamite. For his final run of the season, Big Orange was sent to Australia to contest the Melbourne Cup over 3200 metres at Flemington Racecourse on 5 November. Starting a 60/1 outsider he led the field into the straight before being overtaken but kept on well in the closing stages to finish fifth of the 24 runners, two and a half lengths behind the winner Prince of Penzance.

=== 2016: five-year-old season ===
Big Orange began his 2016 campaign with a trip to United Arab Emirates for the Dubai Gold Cup on 26 March in which he finished second, beaten a neck by the French-trained gelding Vazirabad. On his return to Europe he ran third behind Exospheric and Simple Verse in the Jockey Club Stakes at Newmarket on 30 April.

Plans to run the gelding in the Ascot Gold Cup were abandoned as the ground was deemed to be unsuitably soft. When Big Orange attempted to repeat his 2015 success in the Princess of Wales's Stakes on 7 July he started the 8/1 sixth choice in a seven-runner field. The Grey Gatsby was made favourite while the other runners included Second Step and Exospheric. Ridden by James McDonald, the gelding led from the start, opened up a clear advantage a furlong out, and won by two and a half lengths from The Grey Gatsby. Michael Bell commented "He just loves fast, summer ground and we've had to wait all year for it basically. He's older and stronger now and that was probably his career-best performance. He beat some very good horses pretty easily".

Later that month Big Orange, with Spencer in the saddle, went off the 11/4 favourite for the Goodwood Cup, with the best-fancied of his thirteen opponents being Sword Fighter (Curragh Cup), Quest For More, Pallasator and Sheikhzayedroad. Big Orange set the pace as usual, and although he was overtaken by Sword Fighter in the last quarter mile but rallied to regain the advantage. He kept on "very gamely" in the closing stages and won by one and a quarter lengths and a head from Pallasator and Sheikhzayedroad. Spencer commented "He wears his heart on his sleeve. He's a big strong galloper and he's got stronger since last year and can sustain top speed. I always wanted to be leading or sat second, but he got on with it and put them to the sword."

Big Orange embarked on an international campaign in the late autumn of 2016. He made little impression when running tenth in the Melbourne Cup but produced a much better effort in the Zipping Classic eleven days later in which he finished third, beaten a short head and a head by Beautiful Romance and Almoonqith in a three-way photo finish. In the Hong Kong Cup at Sha Tin Racecourse in December he was outpaced in the straight and came home unplaced behind Satono Crown.

=== 2017: six-year-old season ===
As in the previous year, Big Orange made his seasonal debut in the Dubai Gold Cup and ran fourth behind Vazirabad, Beautiful Romance and Sheikhzayedroad. On 25 May, on his first run of the season in Europe the gelding started odds-on favourite for the Henry II Stakes over two miles at Sandown Park Racecourse. Ridden by Frankie Dettori he led from the start and drew right away from his rivals in the straight to win by five lengths from Higher Power.

On 22 June Big Orange was one of fourteen horses to contest the Gold Cup over two and a half miles at Royal Ascot and stated the 5/1 second favourite behind the 2016 winner Order of St George. The other runners included Simple Verse, Sheikhzayedroad, Harbour Law, Trip To Paris, Sweet Selection (Cesarewitch), Quest For More, Torcedor (Vintage Crop Stakes) and Endless Time (Lancashire Oaks). Ridden by James Doyle in the absence of the injured Dettori, he disputed the lead with Quest For More before established a clear advantage after six furlongs. After going two lengths clear in the straight he was strongly challenged by Order of St George but held on to win in a photo finish by a short head with a gap of six lengths back to Harbour Law in third. Michael Bell said "It was an epic race. I can't describe the feeling of pride I have in my horse.I was just begging for the line to come. The horse is a superstar - he's a warrior."

On 1 August Big Orange attempted to become the first horse to win three consecutive runnings of the Goodwood Cup (Double Trigger won the race three times in four years) and started the 6/4 favourite in a fourteen-runner field. With Dettori in the saddle he led from the start but was overtaken in the straight and beaten one and three quarter lengths by the three-year-old Stradivarius. In the British Champions Long Distance Cup at Ascot on 21 October Big Orange led early but quickly dropped from contention and finished tailed off in a race won by Order of St George.

== Last race and retirement ==
For the third consecutive year, Big Orange began his season in the Dubai Gold Cup. On this occasion he started slowly before settling in third place before dropping back and coming home twelfth of the sixteen runners behind Vazirabad. In May it was announced that the gelding had sustained a leg injury and would not race again in 2018. Michael Bell said "It's a body blow for all concerned but the vet is cautiously optimistic that it should heal in time".

In February 2019 Bell announced that Big Orange's leg injury had "flared up" again and that the horse had been retired from racing. His owner Tim Gredley said that the gelding would return to his birthplace and spend his retirement at Stetchworth.

== Pedigree ==
Pedigree of Big Orange (GB), bay gelding, 2011
Sire Duke of Marmalade (IRE) 2004	Danehill (USA); 1986	Danzig	Northern Dancer (CAN)
Sire Duke of Marmalade (IRE) 2004	Danehill (USA); 1986	Danzig	Pas de Nome
Sire Duke of Marmalade (IRE) 2004	Danehill (USA); 1986	Razyana	His Majesty
Sire Duke of Marmalade (IRE) 2004	Danehill (USA); 1986	Razyana	Spring Adieu
Sire Duke of Marmalade (IRE) 2004	Love Me True (USA); 1998	Kingmambo	Mr Prospector
Sire Duke of Marmalade (IRE) 2004	Love Me True (USA); 1998	Kingmambo	Miesque
Sire Duke of Marmalade (IRE) 2004	Love Me True (USA); 1998	Lassie's Lady	Alydar
Sire Duke of Marmalade (IRE) 2004	Love Me True (USA); 1998	Lassie's Lady	Lassie Dear
Dam Miss Brown To You (IRE) 2005	Fasliyev (USA); 1997	Nureyev	Northern Dancer (CAN)
Dam Miss Brown To You (IRE) 2005	Fasliyev (USA); 1997	Nureyev	Special
Dam Miss Brown To You (IRE) 2005	Fasliyev (USA); 1997	Mr P's Princess	Mr Prospector
Dam Miss Brown To You (IRE) 2005	Fasliyev (USA); 1997	Mr P's Princess	Anne Campbell
Dam Miss Brown To You (IRE) 2005	Almaaseh (IRE); 1988	Dancing Brave (USA)	Lyphard
Dam Miss Brown To You (IRE) 2005	Almaaseh (IRE); 1988	Dancing Brave (USA)	Navajo Princess
Dam Miss Brown To You (IRE) 2005	Almaaseh (IRE); 1988	Al Bahathri (USA)	Blushing Groom (FR)
Dam Miss Brown To You (IRE) 2005	Almaaseh (IRE); 1988	Al Bahathri (USA)	Chain Store (family: 9-e)
