= Mount Nelson (horse) =

British-bred Thoroughbred racehorse

- Sire: Rock of Gibraltar
- Grandsire: Danehill
- Dam: Independence
- Damsire: Selkirk
- Sex: Stallion
- Foaled: 7 April 2004
- Country: United Kingdom
- Colour: Bay
- Breeder: Cliveden Stud
- Owner: Derrick Smith, Susan Magnier and Michael Tabor
- Trainer: Aidan O'Brien
- Record: 9: 3-1-2
- Earnings: £459,137

Major wins
- Critérium International (2006); Eclipse Stakes (2008)

Mount Nelson (7 April 2004 – 1 November 2019) was a British-bred, Irish-trained Thoroughbred racehorse and sire best known for winning the Eclipse Stakes in 2008. Mount Nelson showed great promise as a two-year-old in 2006 when he won the Critérium International less than a month after his racecourse debut. Hopes that he would become a classic contender in 2007 ended when he sustained a serious foot injury early in the year. He returned as a four-year-old to win the Eclipse and ran well in defeat in several other major races. He was then retired to stud and sired several good winners both on the flat and over jumps.

== Background ==
Mount Nelson was a bay horse with a white star and stripe bred by the Cliveden Park Stud in Buckinghamshire. Mount Nelson was from the first crop of foals sired by Rock of Gibraltar who won seven Group 1 races in a row, including the 2000 Guineas. He has gone on to sire a number of other top racehorses, including Society Rock, Eagle Mountain, Varenar (Prix de la Forêt) and Samitar (Irish 1000 Guineas). Mount Nelson's dam, Independence, was a high-class racemare who won four races including the Matron Stakes and the Sun Chariot Stakes in 2001. She was descended from Home on the Range, the dam of the Epsom Derby winner Reference Point. Apart from Mount Nelson, Independence's best performer has been Monitor Closely, who won the Great Voltigeur Stakes and finished third in the St Leger Stakes.

As a yearling, the colt was consigned from the New England Stud to the Tattersalls sales at Newmarket. On 5 October he was bought for 330,000 guineas by the bloodstock agent Dermot "Demi" O'Byrne, acting on behalf of John Magnier's Coolmore organisation. Like many Coolmore horses, the details of Mount Nelson's ownership varied from race to race: he was sometimes listed as being owned by Derrick Smith, while in other races he was listed as the property of a partnership of Smith, Susan Magnier and Michael Tabor. The colt was trained throughout his racing career by Aidan O'Brien at Ballydoyle.

== Racing career ==
=== 2006: two-year-old season ===
Mount Nelson did not compete in a race until late autumn, but then ran three times in a little over three weeks. On 6 October he started at odds of 5/2 in a seven furlong maiden race at Gowran Park, County Kilkenny and finished second of the fourteen runners behind the Dermot Weld-trained Treasure Map. In a similar event at the Curragh Racecourse sixteen days later, the colt started 2/1 favourite against twenty-eight opponents. Ridden by Seamie Heffernan, Mount Nelson established a clear lead approaching the final quarter mile and drew away from the field in the closing stages to win impressively by six lengths. Eight days after his win in the Curragh maiden race, the colt was moved up abruptly in class when he was sent to France to contest the Group One Critérium International over 1600 metres at Saint-Cloud Racecourse. He was coupled in the betting with his stable companion Yellowstone and went off at odds of 10.9/1, with the locally trained Spirit One being made the 3/5 favourite. Heffernan restrained Mount Nelson in the early stages before moving up to challenge the leaders in the straight. He took the lead approaching the last 200 metres and held off a sustained challenge of Spirit One to win by a short-head in a photo-finish, with Yellowstone in third. Despite the soft ground, the winning time of 1:41.3 was a new course record. Commenting on the performance, O'Brien said "Our decision to run Mount Nelson twice in the period of a week was justified, but it was a big risk. He's a lovely horse who will be even better next year when he should stay further." The trainer went on to mention the 2000 Guineas and the Poule d'Essai des Poulains as future targets, whilst bookmakers introduced him into the betting for the 2007 Epsom Derby at odds of 20/1.

=== 2007: three-year-old season ===
Mount Nelson was being prepared for his three-year-old campaign when he sustained a serious injury to his left front foot. According to O'Brien the colt "tore off a shoe... and took half of his foot off with it". Both the hoof and bone were damaged, necessitating surgery and a long period of recuperation. He made his one and only appearance of the season at Newmarket Racecourse in October when he ran in the Champion Stakes. He started a 16/1 outsider and finished eleventh of the twelve runners, forty lengths behind the winner Literato.

=== 2008: four-year-old season ===
On his return to racing as a four-year-old, Mount Nelson started odd-on favourite for the Mooresbridge Stakes at the Curragh in May, but was never in contention and finished sixth of the eight runners. A month later he showed improved form to finish third in the Prix du Chemin de Fer du Nord at Chantilly despite having difficulty obtaining a clear run in the straight. On 17 June, Mount Nelson returned to Group One level for the Queen Anne Stakes over one mile at Royal Ascot. Racing against leading milers he started at odds of 33/1 and finished fifth of the ten runners behind Haradasun, Darjina, Finsceal Beo and Cesare, beaten just over a length by the winner. For the second race in succession he encountered trouble in running, being "squeezed out" approaching the final furlong.

On 5 July, Mount Nelson started the 7/2 second favourite in for the Eclipse Stakes at Sandown Park Racecourse. The field for the weight-for-age event appeared to be well below the usual standard: none of Mount Nelson's seven opponents had won at Group One level. Ridden by Johnny Murtagh, the colt was held up in the early stages before making progress in the straight. Despite hanging to the right a furlong from the finish he caught the leader Phoenix Tower in the last stride and won by a short-head. Commenting on the colt's victory, O'Brien said that "the whole team did a great job to get him back, and they need to take all the credit. He is an amazing horse to come back, and we didn’t think he would make it."

After a break of two months, Mount Nelson was sent to the United States to contest the Arlington Million over one and a quarter miles at Arlington Park. Murtagh positioned the colt in second place for most of the race, but he could make no progress in the straight and finished third behind Spirit One and Archipenko.

== Assessment ==
In the 2008 edition of the World Thoroughbred Racehorse Rankings, Mount Nelson was given a rating of 119, making him the fifty-second best racehorse in the world.

== Stud record ==
Mount Nelson was retired from racing to become a breeding stallion at Newsells Park Stud in Hertfordshire, where he stood at a fee of £6,000 along with Nathaniel and the leading sprinter Equiano. The best of his first crop of foals was the filly Purr Along, which won the Prix du Calvados at Deauville Racecourse in August 2012. At Royal Ascot in June 2013, Berkshire, a colt from Mount Nelson's second crop won the Listed Chesham Stakes by two and a half lengths. The most successful of his subsequent offspring was the sprinter Librisa Breeze (British Champions Sprint Stakes).

He later moved to the Boardsmill Stud in County Meath where he stood as a National Hunt stallion, siring the Stayers' Hurdle winner Penhill. After a "prolonged battle with lymphangitis" he died in 2019 at the age of fifteen.

== Pedigree ==
Pedigree of Mount Nelson (GB), bay stallion, 2004
Sire Rock of Gibraltar (IRE) b. 1999	Danehill (USA) b. 1986	Danzig (USA) b. 1977	Northern Dancer*
Sire Rock of Gibraltar (IRE) b. 1999	Danehill (USA) b. 1986	Danzig (USA) b. 1977	Pas de Nom
Sire Rock of Gibraltar (IRE) b. 1999	Danehill (USA) b. 1986	Razyana (USA) b. 1981	His Majesty
Sire Rock of Gibraltar (IRE) b. 1999	Danehill (USA) b. 1986	Razyana (USA) b. 1981	Spring Adieu
Sire Rock of Gibraltar (IRE) b. 1999	Offshore Boom (IRE) ch. 1985	Be My Guest (USA) ch. 1974	Northern Dancer*
Sire Rock of Gibraltar (IRE) b. 1999	Offshore Boom (IRE) ch. 1985	Be My Guest (USA) ch. 1974	What a Treat
Sire Rock of Gibraltar (IRE) b. 1999	Offshore Boom (IRE) ch. 1985	Push a Button (IRE) b. 1980	Bold Lad
Sire Rock of Gibraltar (IRE) b. 1999	Offshore Boom (IRE) ch. 1985	Push a Button (IRE) b. 1980	River Lady
Dam Independence (GB) b. 1998	Selkirk (USA) ch. 1988	Sharpen Up (GB) ch. 1969	Atan
Dam Independence (GB) b. 1998	Selkirk (USA) ch. 1988	Sharpen Up (GB) ch. 1969	Rocchetta
Dam Independence (GB) b. 1998	Selkirk (USA) ch. 1988	Annie Edge (IRE) ch. 1980	Nebbiolo
Dam Independence (GB) b. 1998	Selkirk (USA) ch. 1988	Annie Edge (IRE) ch. 1980	Friendly Court
Dam Independence (GB) b. 1998	Yukon Hope (USA) b. 1993	Forty Niner (USA) ch. 1985	Mr. Prospector
Dam Independence (GB) b. 1998	Yukon Hope (USA) b. 1993	Forty Niner (USA) ch. 1985	File
Dam Independence (GB) b. 1998	Yukon Hope (USA) b. 1993	Sahara Forest (GB) b. 1988	Green Desert
Dam Independence (GB) b. 1998	Yukon Hope (USA) b. 1993	Sahara Forest (GB) b. 1988	Home on the Range (Family: 10-d)

Note: b. = Bay, ch. = Chestnut

* Mount Nelson is inbred 4x4 to Northern Dancer. This means that the stallion appears twice in the fourth generation of his pedigree.
