= David Harrison (jockey) =

Welsh flat racing jockey

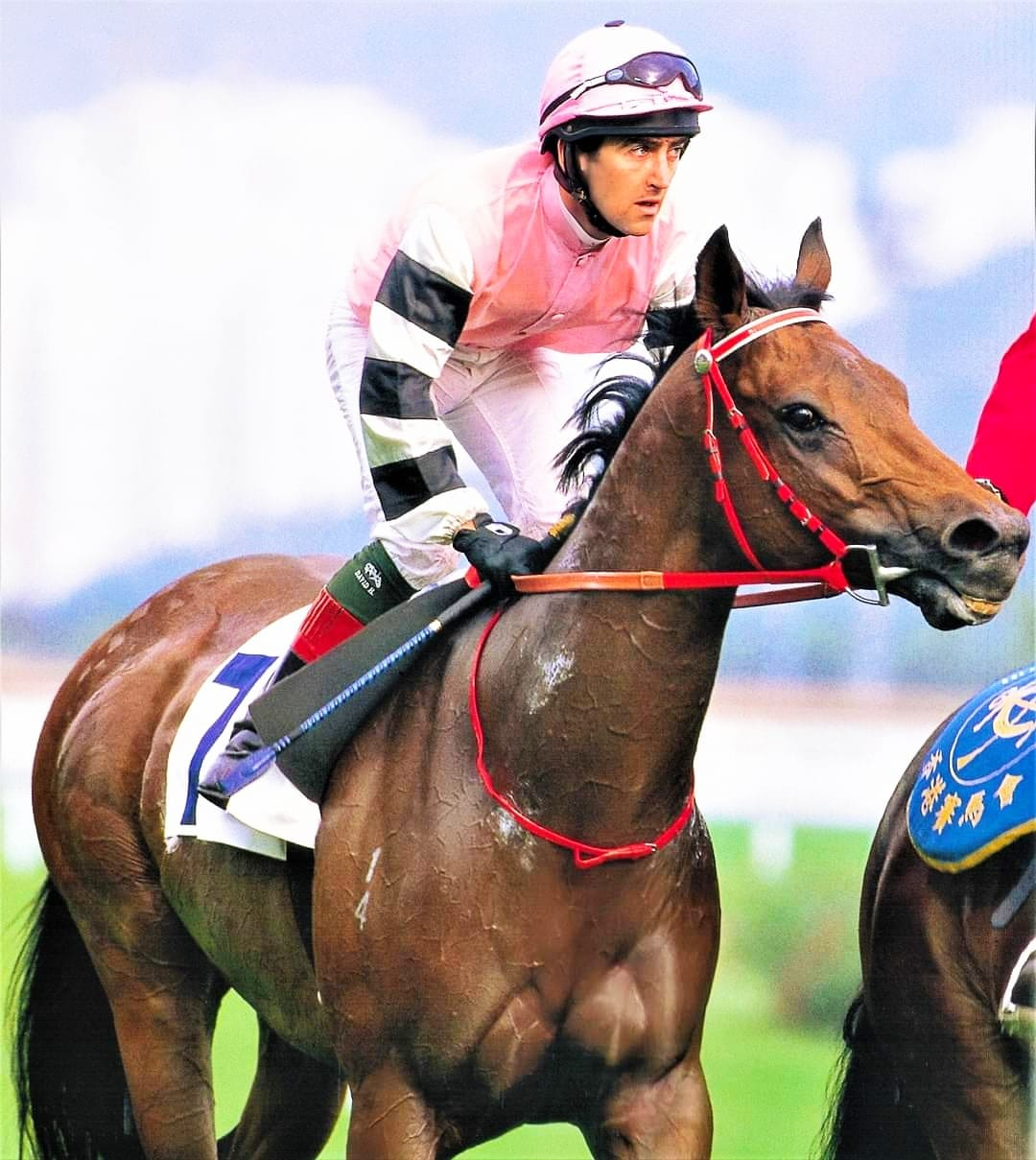
- David Harrison aboard Holy Grail after winning the 1999 Hong Kong Derby
- Occupation: Jockey
- Born: 8 July 1972 (age 52); St Asaph, North Wales

Major racing wins
- Irish St Leger, Hong Kong Derby, Derby Italiano, Swiss Derby, Ulster Derby, Royal Hunt Cup, Criterion Stakes, Northumberland Plate, Cambridgeshire Handicap, Nell Gwyn Stakes

Racing awards
- British flat racing Champion Apprentice 1992

Honours
- Lester Award Apprentice Jockey of the Year 1992

Significant horses
- Arctic Owl, Holy Grail, Single Empire, Mongol Warrior, Penny Drops, Blomberg, Thrilling Day, Colour Sergeant, Bishop of Cashel, Bold Gait, Miss Stamper, Don Corleone, Travelmate, Romanov, Muchea, Docklands Limo

David Paul Harrison (born 8 July 1972) is a retired Welsh flat racing jockey.

Harrison began his career as apprentice jockey to Lord Huntingdon and rode his first winner on Majestic Image at Southwell Racecourse on St David's Day, 1 March 1991. He went on to become the British flat racing Champion Apprentice jockey in 1992, with 56 winners, also winning the Lester Award for 'Apprentice Jockey of the Year'.

During his 11 years in racing, Harrison’s major wins included the Royal Hunt Cup for Queen Elizabeth II at Royal Ascot (Colour Sergeant) along with victories in the Hong Kong Derby (Holy Grail) and Irish St. Leger (Arctic Owl).

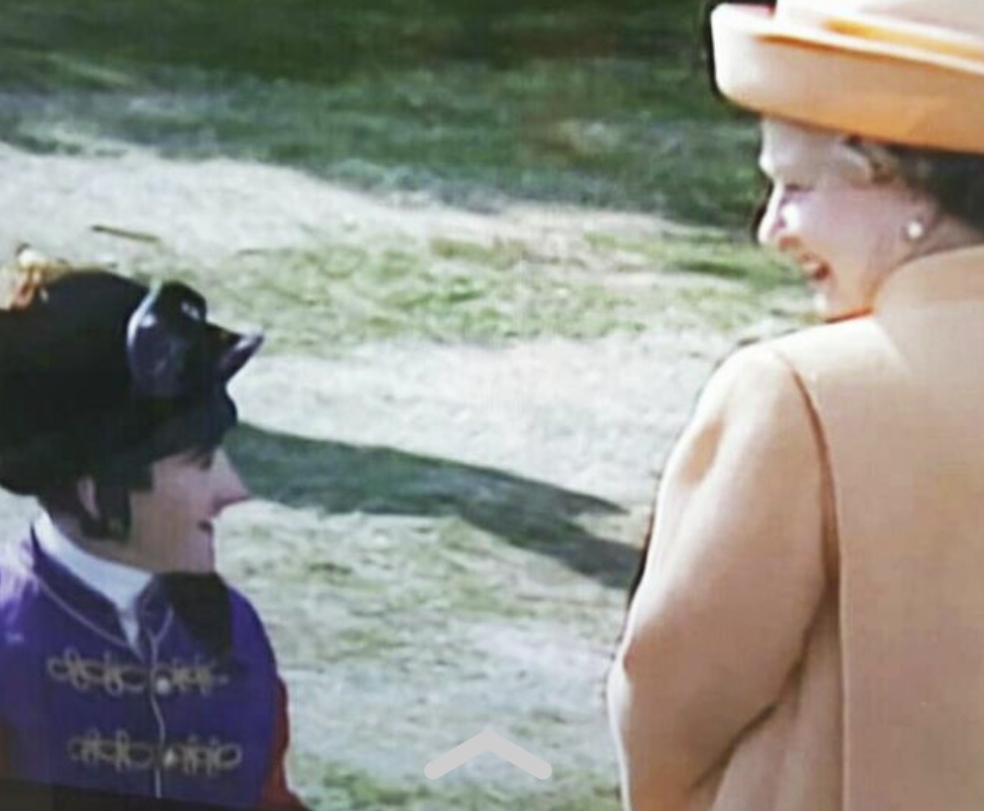

David Harrison with Her Majesty Queen Elizabeth II after their triumph in the 1992 Royal Hunt Cup

In 1997, he rode Single Empire to victory in the Derby Italiano trained by Peter Chapple-Hyam. Other notable group winners during his career include Penny Drops and Mongol Warrior, both trained by Lord Huntingdon, the latter becoming the first British-trained winner of the Swiss Derby. He rode many other winners worldwide with the majority coming in the UK and Hong Kong where he was a retained jockey to trainers James Fanshawe and Brian Kan.

Harrison's career ended prematurely after he damaged his spinal cord when he fell from the racehorse, My Chief, in a race at Sha Tin Racecourse, Hong Kong, on 30 May 2001. My Chief clipped the heels of another horse and took a heavy fall.

After his accident, Harrison relocated to Andalucia and became an agent for other jockeys.
