= Joe Mac Novice Hurdle =

Hurdle horse race in Ireland

Dolores Purcell Memorial Novice Hurdle
2025
| Love Me Tender | Whimsy | Arch Empire |

Previous years
2024
Gaucher | Sunchart | Ah Fuhgeddaboudit
2023
Williamstowndancer | Bialystok | Birdie Or Bust
2022
Champ Kiely | Brazil | Hubrisko
2021
Purple Mountain | Bonarc | The Names Jock

2020-2011
2020
Shewearsitwell | Goodbye Someday | Wajaaha
2019
Turnpike Trip | Razoul | Popong
2018
Quick Grabim | Triplicate | Easy Game
2017
Sayar | Morgan | Housesofparliament
2016
Penhill | Balzac Turgot | Timiyan
2015
Bachasson | Three Stars | Cardinal Palace
2014
Rich Coast | Macnicholson | Storm Away
2013
King of The Picts | Que Pasa | Shamar
2012
Whatever Jacksays | Passage Vendome | Top Madam
2011
Tavern Times | Bleakfield Lady | Jim Will Fix It

2010-2001
2010
Oilily | Ballyadam Brook | Oneeightofamile
2009
Fosters Cross | Loosen My Load | Turf War
2008
Vital Plot | No Full | Desert Abbey
2007
Norther Bay | Mahrajaan | Dark Bolero
2006
Kalderon | Mill House Girl | Footy Facts
2005
French Accordion | Carthalawn | Name For Fame
2004
Studmaster | Orchid Bay | Master Of the Chase
2003
Rupununi | Felix The Great | Blanc C'est Blanc
2002
Wouldn't You Agree | Macs Valley | Pro Dancer
2001
Golden Row | Soltero | Sweet Brief

2000-1997
2000
Copernicus | Penny Rich | Kapok
1999
Stage Affair | Quintus | Sweet Deal
1997
Go Roger Go | Promalee | Dunrally Fort

The Joe Mac Novice Hurdle is a Grade 3 National Hunt novice hurdle race in Ireland which is open to horses aged four years or older. It is run at Tipperary over a distance of about 2 miles (3,218 metres), and it is scheduled to take place each year in October.

The race was awarded Grade 3 status in 2003.

In line with several races at Tipperary, the race is named after a horse owned by J. P. McManus, Joe Mac. Between 2010 and 2016 it was run as the Dolores Purcell Memorial Novice Hurdle.

The race was first run in 1997 and was sponsored for many years by the company owned by J. P. McManus's younger brother, Kevin McManus Bookmakers.

== Records ==
Leading jockey (5 wins):

- Paul Townend - Quick Grabim (2016), Shewearsitwell (2020), Gaucher (2024), Love Me Tender (2025), Witches Familiar (2026)

Leading trainer (11 wins):

- Willie Mullins – Bachasson (2015), Penhill (2016), Sayar (2017), Quick Grabim (2018), Shewearsitwell (2020), Purple Mountain (2021), Champ Kiely (2022), Williamstowndancer (2023), Gaucher (2024), Love Me Tender (2025), Witches Familiar (2026)

== Winners ==
| Year | Winner | Age | Jockey | Trainer |
|---|---|---|---|---|
| 1997 | Go Roger Go | | Richard Dunwoody | Edward O'Grady |
| 1998 | no race 1998 |
| 1999 | Stage Affair | 5 | Tony McCoy | Dermot Weld |
| 2000 | Copernicus (Note: The 2000 running took place at Cork) | 5 | Paul Carberry | P Hughes |
| 2001 | Golden Row | 7 | P P O'Brien | Charles Byrnes |
| 2002 | Wouldn't You Agree | 6 | Paul Moloney | Christy Roche |
| 2003 | Rupununi | 6 | Paul Carberry | Francis Ennis |
| 2004 | Studmaster | 4 | Tommy Treacy | Jessica Harrington |
| 2005 | French Accordion | 5 | Barry Geraghty | Paul Nolan |
| 2006 | Kalderon | 6 | David Casey | Tom Hogan |
| 2007 | Norther Bay | 4 | David Casey | Eoin Griffin |
| 2008 | Vital Plot | 4 | Ruby Walsh | Dermot Weld |
| 2009 | Fosters Cross | 7 | Davy Russell | Thomas Mullins |
| 2010 | Oilily | 7 | Andrew Leigh | Sean Byrne |
| 2011 | Tavern Times | 7 | Davy Russell | Thomas Mullins |
| 2012 | Whatever Jacksays | 7 | Robbie Colgan | Oliver McKiernan |
| 2013 | King of The Picts | 4 | Andrew McNamara | John Patrick Shanahan |
| 2014 | Rich Coast | 6 | Paul Carberry | Noel Meade |
| 2015 | Bachasson | 4 | Ruby Walsh | Willie Mullins |
| 2016 | Penhill | 5 | Ruby Walsh | Willie Mullins |
| 2017 | Sayar | 4 | Ruby Walsh | Willie Mullins |
| 2018 | Quick Grabim | 6 | Paul Townend | Willie Mullins |
| 2019 | Turnpike Trip | 5 | Kevin Brouder | Charlie Byrnes |
| 2020 | Shewearsitwell | 5 | Paul Townend | Willie Mullins |
| 2021 | Purple Mountain | 6 | Sean O'Keeffe | Willie Mullins |
| 2022 | Champ Kiely | 6 | Danny Mullins | Willie Mullins |
| 2023 | Williamstowndancer | 5 | Danny Mullins | Willie Mullins |
| 2024 | Gaucher | 5 | Paul Townend | Willie Mullins |
| 2025 | Love Me Tender | 4 | Paul Townend | Willie Mullins |
| 2026 | Witches Familiar | 4 | Paul Townend | Willie Mullins |

== See also ==
- Horse racing in Ireland
- List of Irish National Hunt races
