= Arctic Owl (horse) =

British-bred Thoroughbred racehorse

- Sire: Most Welcome
- Grandsire: Be My Guest
- Dam: Short Rations
- Damsire: Lorenzaccio
- Sex: Gelding
- Foaled: 29 March 1994
- Died: 13 August 2021 (aged 27)
- Country: United Kingdom
- Colour: Bay
- Breeder: John Greetham
- Owner: The Owl Society
- Trainer: James Fanshawe
- Record: 25: 10-4-5
- Earnings: £285,812

Major wins
- Prix Kergorlay (1998); Jockey Club Cup (1998); Henry II Stakes (1999); Shergar Cup Classic (2000); Irish St Leger (2000)

Arctic Owl (29 March 1994 – 13 August 2021) was a British Thoroughbred racehorse. A specialist stayer who was gelded before the start of his racing career, he won ten of twenty-five races between his June 1997 debut and September 2002 retirement. As a four-year-old in 1998, he emerged as a top class performer when he won four of his five races including the Prix Kergorlay and the Jockey Club Cup. He won the Henry II Stakes in 1999 and recorded his biggest victory in 2000 when he won the Irish St Leger. He remained in training until the age of eight when his career was ended by injury.

== Background ==
Arctic Owl was a bay horse bred in Norfolk by John Greetham. His breeder was not impressed by the colt, and offered him for sale as a yearling in October 1995 at Tattersalls where he was bought for 10,000 guineas by the bloodstock agent John Warren on behalf of the trainer James Fanshawe. During the horse's racing career he was trained at the Pegasus stables in Newmarket by Fanshawe and owned by a five-man partnership from Devon called The Owl Society. Arctic Owl was gelded before his first race. Fanshawe later recalled "He was too much of a character to begin with and was gelded very early because he was naughty".

He was one of the best horses sired by Most Welcome, who finished second in the 1987 Epsom Derby and later won the Lockinge Stakes: his other offspring included Suances (Prix Jean Prat) and Eccentric (Winter Derby). Arctic Owl's dam Short Rations, was a minor winner as a two-year-old in Italy before being bought for £8,000 by Greetham as a broodmare prospect. She was closely related to Pampapaul and was the female-line ancestor of Victoire Pisa.

== Racing career ==
=== 1997 three-year-old season ===
Arctic Owl was unraced as a juvenile and began his racing career as a three-year-old on 2 June 1997 in a maiden race over ten furlongs at Windsor Racecourse. He started a 25/1 outsider but finished strongly to win by three quarters of a length from the David Elsworth-trained Mystic Ridge. He then finished fourth in a minor race at Newcastle and second in a handicap at Kempton. On 2 September at York Racecourse Arctic Owl carried 129 pounds the Garrowby Handicap over one and a half miles and was awarded the race on the disqualification of Honourable. In his two remaining races he ran third in a valuable handicap at Ascot and then finished unplaced in the November Handicap at Newbury.

=== 1998: four-year-old season ===
In his first three races of 1998 Arctic Owl was partnered by Walter Swinburn. Competing in handicap races, he won over one and a half miles at Newmarket in May and then produced an exceptional performance at York in June when he carried 131 pounds to a fourteen length victory over the dual Chester Cup winner Top Cees. Later that month he started 7/4 favourite for the Northumberland Plate at Newcastle and finished third of the twenty runners, a length behind the winner Cyrian, to whom he was conceding eighteen pounds. With his weight in handicaps continuing to rise Arctic Owl was switched to compete in weight-for-age races. On 23 August the horse was sent to Deauville Racecourse in France for the Prix Kergorlay over 3000 metres in which he was ridden by Kieren Fallon and started the 5.1/1 third favourite behind Tajoun (Prix Vicomtesse Vigier) and Kayf Tara. After being restrained in the early stages, Arctic Owl turned into the straight in second place behind the Goodwood Cup winner Grey Shot, took the lead inside the final 200 metres and won by one and a half lengths.

The Jockey Club Cup over two miles at Newmarket on 3 October saw Arctic Owl start the 7/2 second favourite behind the Yorkshire Cup winner Busy Flight in a seven-runner field which also included Celeric, Grey Shot, Samraan (King George V Stakes) and Craigsteel. Ridden by Ray Cochrane the gelding raced in fourth place before moving up to take the lead approaching the last quarter mile. He quickly went clear of the field and held off the late challenge of Celeric to win by a length, with a gap of three and a half lengths back to Samraan in third.

=== 1999: five-year-old season ===
On his first run as a five-year-old, Arctic Owl started favourite for the Yorkshire Cup on 13 May but was beaten a neck and half a length into third by Churlish Charm and Largesse. At the end of the month he was one of eleven horses including Celeric, Persian Punch, Spirit of Love (Cesarewitch Handicap), Canon Can (Doncaster Cup), Maridpour (Queen's Vase) and Rainbow High (Chester Cup) to contest the Henry II Stakes over two miles at Sandown Park Racecourse. Ridden by Cochrane he settled behind the leaders before making a forward move in the straight but struggled to obtain a clear run. In the final furlong he was extricated from his predicament as he was switched left and produced a strong late run to catch Rainbow High in the final strides and win by a short head.

Arctic Owl failed to win again in 1999, but produced a series of creditable efforts in defeat. He finished second to Craigsteel in the Princess of Wales's Stakes at Newmarket in July and second to Celeric in the Lonsdale Stakes at York in August. When attempting to repeat his 1998 success in the Jockey Club Cup he finished runner-up yet again as he went down by a neck to Rainbow High, to whom he was conceding five pounds in weight. On his final start of the year he failed to reproduce his best form and finished last of the seven runners in the Prix Royal-Oak over 3100 metres at Longchamp on 24 October.

=== 2000: six-year-old season ===
Arctic Owl began his fourth campaign by finishing third to Persian Punch and Churlish Charm in the Henry II Stakes at Sandown on 29 May. He then made his first and only appearance in the Ascot Gold Cup and came home seventh of the eleven runners behind Kayf Tara. The second running of the Shergar Cup at Ascot on 12 August saw two teams of jockeys representing Europe and the Rest of the World compete in a series of races. Arctic Owl, ridden by Johnny Murtagh, represented the European team in the one and a half mile "Classic" and came from well off the pace to win by a head from Murghem.

On 16 September Arctic Owl was sent to Ireland to contest the Irish St Leger over one and three quarter miles at the Curragh. Ridden by David Harrison he started the 7/2 third choice in the betting behind Mutafaweq and Katiykha (Duke of Edinburgh Stakes). The other five runners were Yavana's Pace (John Porter Stakes), Little Rock (Princess of Wales's Stakes), Chimes At Midnight, Lermontov (Beresford Stakes) and Rostropovich. Lermontov set the early pace before giving way to Yavana's Pace at half way with Arctic Owl settled in fifth by Harrison before making a forward move in the straight. Arctic Owl overtook Yavana's Pace approaching the final furlong and kept on well to win by one and a half lengths. After the race Fanshawe commented "It's a great thrill to have my first winner in Ireland, and even more so to win a Classic with a horse which we picked up originally for only 10,000 guineas at Newmarket". When asked about a challenge for the Melbourne Cup he added "It is a long way to go and a hell of a risk. But it is hugely valuable and I think a horse like Arctic Owl would go well".

On his final appearance of the season, Arctic Owl was indeed shipped to Australia to contest the Melbourne Cup over 3200 metres at Flemington Racecourse on 7 November. Starting at odds of 14/1 he was hampered on the final turn but produced a strong late run to finish fifth of the 22 runners behind Brew to whom he was conceding sixteen pounds.

=== 2002: eight-year-old season ===
Arctic Owl was off the track for well over a year after sustaining a tendon injury in his Melbourne Cup run. On returning the horse to racing Fanshawe experimented by entering Arctic Owl in a hurdle race at Doncaster in January 2002 in which he started odds-on favourite but finished fourth of the twelve runners. The performance saw him ruled out of a projected run in the Champion Hurdle. The gelding returned to the flat in May when he finished third to High Pitched in the Listed Aston Park Stakes at Newbury. Arctic Owl made his final appearance in a minor event at Windsor on 24 August 2002 in which he was ridden by Richard Hughes. After racing in third place he took the lead inside the final furlong and won by one and a quarter lengths from Gamut.

He was being prepared for another run in the Irish St Leger when he suffered an recurrence of an existing tendon injury and was retired from racing. Fanshawe said "He was a real star for the yard... At least we've retired him at home, having won his last race, rather than him breaking down on the track... He's been a grand servant. He was a horse who improved every year we had him until he won the Irish Leger in 2000. He'll have some time off now before we find him a good home".

== Retirement ==
Shortly after he retired from racing Arctic Owl relocated to Devon where he was cared for by his owner’s daughter Elli Morgan. He was successfully retrained to compete in show jumping and dressage and was described as "the perfect father figure around younger horses". He died on 13 August 2021, aged 27.

== Pedigree ==
Pedigree of Arctic Owl (GB), bay gelding, 1994
Sire Most Welcome (GB) 1984	Be My Guest (USA); 1974	Northern Dancer	Nearctic
Sire Most Welcome (GB) 1984	Be My Guest (USA); 1974	Northern Dancer	Natalma
Sire Most Welcome (GB) 1984	Be My Guest (USA); 1974	What A Treat	Tudor Minstrel
Sire Most Welcome (GB) 1984	Be My Guest (USA); 1974	What A Treat	Rare Treat
Sire Most Welcome (GB) 1984	Topsy (GB); 1976	Habitat	Sir Gaylord
Sire Most Welcome (GB) 1984	Topsy (GB); 1976	Habitat	Little Hut
Sire Most Welcome (GB) 1984	Topsy (GB); 1976	Furioso	Ballymoss
Sire Most Welcome (GB) 1984	Topsy (GB); 1976	Furioso	Violetta
Dam Short Rations (GB) 1975	Lorenzaccio (GB); 1965	Klairon	Clarion
Dam Short Rations (GB) 1975	Lorenzaccio (GB); 1965	Klairon	Kalmia
Dam Short Rations (GB) 1975	Lorenzaccio (GB); 1965	Phoenissa	The Phoenix
Dam Short Rations (GB) 1975	Lorenzaccio (GB); 1965	Phoenissa	Erica Fragrans
Dam Short Rations (GB) 1975	Short Commons (GB); 1962	Hard Tack	Hard Sauce
Dam Short Rations (GB) 1975	Short Commons (GB); 1962	Hard Tack	Cowes
Dam Short Rations (GB) 1975	Short Commons (GB); 1962	Padus	Anwar
Dam Short Rations (GB) 1975	Short Commons (GB); 1962	Padus	Cherry Way (Family: 8-d)
