= Henry II Stakes =

Flat horse race in Britain

- Class: Group 3
- Location: Sandown Park; Esher, England
- Inaugurated: 1963
- Race type: Flat / Thoroughbred
- Sponsor: Star Sports
- Website: Sandown Park

Race information
- Distance: 2m 50y (3,264m)
- Surface: Turf
- Track: Right-handed
- Qualification: Four-years-old and up
- Weight: 9 st 3 lb (4yo); 9 st 4 lb (5yo+); Allowances; 3 lb for fillies and mares Penalties; 7 lb for Group 1 winners * 5 lb for Group 2 winners * 3 lb for Group 3 winners * * since 31 August last year
- Purse: £80,000 (2025); 1st: £45,368

Henry II Stakes
2026
Dubai Future	Sweet William	Lazy Griff

Previous years
2025
Trawlerman	Coltrane	Al Nayyir
2024
Sweet William	Caius Chorister	Trueshan
2023
Roberto Escobarr	Nate The Great	Sleeping Lion
2022
Quickthorn	Nate The Great	Rodrigo Diaz
2021
Lismore	Ranch Hand	Ocean Wind

2020-2010
2020
Dashing Willoughby	Spanish Mission	Cross Counter
2019
Dee Ex Bee	Mekong	Austrian School
2018
Magic Circle	Red Verdon	Weekender
2017
Big Orange	Higher Power	She Is No Lady
2016
Pallasator	Suegioo	Max Dynamite
2015
Vent De Force	Trip To Paris	Aussie Reigns
2014
Brown Panther	High Jinx	Whiplash Willie
2013
Gloomy Sunday	Number Theory	Model Pupil
2012
Opinion Poll	Ibicenco	Chiberta King
2011
Blue Bajan	Montaff	Holberg

2010-2001
2010
Akmal	Saptapadi	Darley Sun
2009
Geordieland	Patkai	Tastahil
2008
Finalmente	Balkan Knight	Royal And Regal
2007
Allegretto	Balkan Knight	Bulwark
2006
Tungsten Strike	Winged d'Argent	Barolo
2005
Fight Your Corner	Lochbuie	Alcazar
2004
Papineau	Mr Dinos	New South Wales
2003
Mr Dinos	Pole Star	Kasthari
2002
Akbar	Invermark	Persian Punch
2001
Solo Mio	Romantic Affair	Persian Punch

2000-1991
2000
Persian Punch	Churlish Charm	Arctic Owl
1999
Arctic Owl	Rainbow High	Maridpour
1998
Persian Punch	Samraan	Kayf Tara
1997
Persian Punch	Celeric	Eva Luna
1996
Double Trigger	Assessor	Court Of Honour
1995
Double Trigger	Old Rouvel	Linney Head
1994
My Patriarch	Zinaad	Further Flight
1993
Brier Creek	Not In Doubt	Assessor
1992
Drum Taps	Arcadian Heights	Tyrone Bridge
1991
Top Of The World	Crack	Teamster

1990-1988
1990
Teamster	Mountain Kingdom	Chelsea Girl
1989
Sadeem	Zero Watt	Zaffaran
1988
Primitive Rising	Guarde Royale	Sadeem

The Henry II Stakes is a Group 3 flat horse race in Great Britain open to horses aged four years or older. It is run at Sandown Park over a distance of 2 miles and 50 yards (3,264 metres), and it is scheduled to take place each year in late May.

== History ==
The event is named after Henry II, who founded a priory on the site of Sandown Park in the 12th century. It was established in 1963, and the inaugural running was won by Gaul.

The present system of race grading was introduced in 1971, and for a period the Henry II Stakes held Group 3 status. It was promoted to Group 2 in 2002, and relegated back to Group 3 in 2012.

The leading horses from the Henry II Stakes often go on to compete in the following month's Gold Cup at Ascot. The last to win both in the same year was Trawlerman in 2025.

== Records ==
Most successful horse (3 wins):

- Persian Punch – 1997, 1998, 2000

Leading jockey (6 wins):

- Frankie Dettori – Drum Taps (1992), Mr Dinos (2003), Papineau (2004), Finalmente (2008), Opinion Poll (2012), Big Orange (2017)

Leading trainer (6 wins):

- Dick Hern – Grey of Falloden (1965), Charlton (1971), Zab (1975), Sea Anchor (1976), Smuggler (1978), Longboat (1986)

== Winners ==
Year	Winner	Age	Jockey	Trainer	Time
1963	Gaul	4	Geoff Lewis	Peter Hastings-Bass	3:36.60
1964	Fighting Ship	4	Peter Robinson	Jack Jarvis	3:43.40
1965	Grey of Falloden	6	Joe Mercer	Dick Hern	3:38.40
1966	Fighting Charlie	5	Greville Starkey	Freddie Maxwell	3:48.00
1967	Parbury	4	Ron Hutchinson	Derrick Candy	3:47.20
1968	Chicago	4	Sandy Barclay	Harry Wragg	3:45.00
1969	Chicago	5	Ron Hutchinson	Harry Wragg	3:52.20
1970	Ginger Boy	6	Bill Williamson	J Hooton	3:42.60
1971	Charlton	4	Joe Mercer	Dick Hern	3:41.50
1972	Hornet	4	Tony Murray	George Todd	3:34.50
1973 (Note: The 1973 running took place at Kempton Park)	The Admiral	4	Geoff Lewis	Noel Murless	3:25.81
1974	Ragstone	4	Ron Hutchinson	John Dunlop	3:36.47
1975	Zab	5	Joe Mercer	Dick Hern	3:36.76
1976	Sea Anchor	4	Joe Mercer	Dick Hern	3:39.03
1977	Grey Baron (Note: Bruni finished first in 1977, but he was disqualified for bumping Grey Baron)	4	Geoff Lewis	Bruce Hobbs	3:44.18
1978	Smuggler	5	Willie Carson	Dick Hern	3:39.18
1979	Buckskin	6	Joe Mercer	Henry Cecil	3:50.32
1980	Billion	6	Pat Eddery	John Dunlop	3:39.88
1981	Abandoned due to waterlogging
1982	Ardross	6	Lester Piggott	Henry Cecil	3:31.16
1983	Ore	5	Lester Piggott	Willie Musson	3:42.65
1984	Harly	4	Pat Eddery	John Dunlop	3:41.78
1985	Destroyer	4	Simon Whitworth	Kim Brassey	3:46.62
1986	Longboat	5	Willie Carson	Dick Hern	3:37.83
1987	Saronicos	4	Tony Ives	Clive Brittain	3:30.47
1988	Primitive Rising	4	Steve Cauthen	Henry Cecil	3:40.95
1989	Sadeem	6	Greville Starkey	Guy Harwood	3:29.93
1990	Teamster	4	Walter Swinburn	Michael Stoute	3:33.88
1991	Top of the World	4	Michael Roberts	Clive Brittain	3:35.59
1992	Drum Taps	6	Frankie Dettori	Lord Huntingdon	3:32.75
1993	Brier Creek	4	Michael Roberts	John Gosden	3:39.64
1994	My Patriarch	4	Pat Eddery	John Dunlop	3:38.34
1995	Double Trigger	4	Jason Weaver	Mark Johnston	3:33.01
1996	Double Trigger	5	Jason Weaver	Mark Johnston	3:41.15
1997	Persian Punch	4	Ray Cochrane	David Elsworth	3:35.15
1998	Persian Punch	5	Walter Swinburn	David Elsworth	3:35.58
1999	Arctic Owl	5	Ray Cochrane	James Fanshawe	3:33.18
2000	Persian Punch	7	Philip Robinson	David Elsworth	3:53.45
2001	Solo Mio	7	Michael Kinane	Amanda Perrett	3:37.43
2002	Akbar	6	Richard Hills	Mark Johnston	3:32.44
2003	Mr Dinos	4	Frankie Dettori	Paul Cole	3:30.50
2004	Papineau	4	Frankie Dettori	Saeed bin Suroor	3:34.17
2005	Fight Your Corner	6	Kerrin McEvoy	Saeed bin Suroor	3:38.77
2006	Tungsten Strike	5	Ryan Moore	Amanda Perrett	3:45.55
2007	Allegretto	4	Seb Sanders	Sir Michael Stoute	3:39.47
2008	Finalmente	6	Frankie Dettori	Simon Callaghan	3:54.30
2009	Geordieland	8	Shane Kelly	Jamie Osborne	3:30.07
2010	Akmal	4	Richard Hills	John Dunlop	3:37.92
2011	Blue Bajan	9	Daniel Tudhope	David O'Meara	3:41.33
2012	Opinion Poll	6	Frankie Dettori	Mahmood Al Zarooni	3:34.80
2013	Gloomy Sunday	4	Olivier Peslier	Christophe Ferland	3:44.57
2014	Brown Panther	6	Richard Kingscote	Tom Dascombe	3:47.94
2015	Vent De Force	4	Richard Hughes	Hughie Morrison	3:37.86
2016	Pallasator	7	Oisin Murphy	Sir Mark Prescott	3:43.12
2017	Big Orange	6	Frankie Dettori	Michael Bell	3:32.67
2018	Magic Circle	6	Fran Berry	Ian Williams	3:41.09
2019	Dee Ex Bee	4	Silvestre de Sousa	Mark Johnston	3:34.00
2020 (Note: The 2020 race was run in July due to the COVID-19 pandemic)	Dashing Willoughby	4	Oisin Murphy	Andrew Balding	3:35.36
2021	Lismore	4	Jamie Spencer	Henry de Bromhead	3:50.22
2022	Quickthorn	5	Tom Marquand	Hughie Morrison	3:38.27
2023	Roberto Escobarr	6	Richard Kingscote	William Haggas	3:38.67
2024	Sweet William	5	Robert Havlin	John and Thady Gosden	3:39.15
2025	Trawlerman	7	William Buick	John and Thady Gosden	3:37.03
2026	Dubai Future	10	David Probert	Saeed bin Suroor	3:39.90

== See also ==
- Horse racing in Great Britain
- List of British flat horse races
