= Rock of Gibraltar (horse) =

Irish-bred Thoroughbred racehorse (1999–2022)

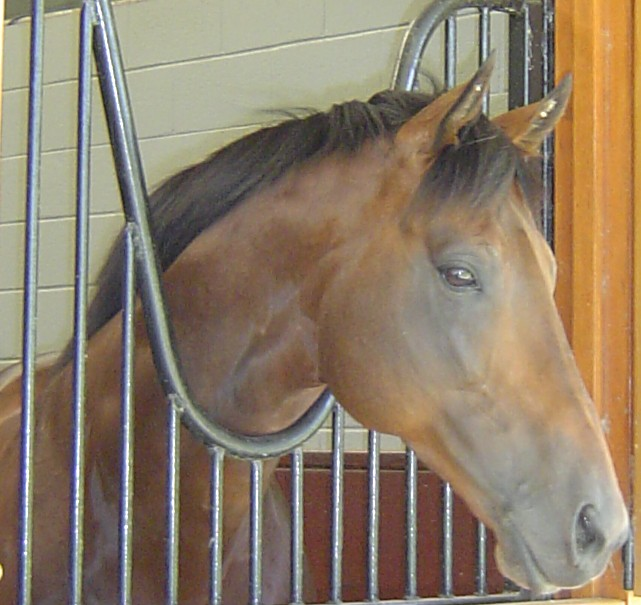
- Rock of Gibraltar, 2005
- Sire: Danehill
- Grandsire: Danzig
- Dam: Offshore Boom
- Damsire: Be My Guest
- Sex: Stallion
- Foaled: 8 March 1999
- Died: 23 October 2022 (aged 23)
- Country: Ireland
- Colour: Bay
- Breeder: Joe Crowley, M/M Aidan P. O'Brien
- Owner: Sue Magnier and Alex Ferguson
- Trainer: Aidan O'Brien
- Record: 13: 10-2-0
- Earnings: £1,164,804

Major wins
- Grand Critérium (2001); Dewhurst Stakes (2001); 2000 Guineas (2002); Irish 2,000 Guineas (2002); St. James's Palace Stakes (2002); Sussex Stakes (2002); Prix du Moulin de Longchamp (2002)

Awards
- European Horse of the Year (2002); European Champion 3-Yr-Old Colt (2002); Timeform rating: 133
- Last updated on 15 September 2022

Rock of Gibraltar (8 March 1999 – 23 October 2022) was an Irish Thoroughbred racehorse who won seven consecutive Group 1 races, including the 2000 Guineas and Irish 2,000 Guineas in 2002. He was at stud in Ireland during the Northern Hemisphere breeding season and in Australia as a shuttle stallion (Note: In Australia, stallions that travel to that continent from elsewhere for the Southern Hemisphere breeding season are known as shuttle stallions.) during the Southern Hemisphere breeding season.

== Background ==
Rock of Gibraltar was sired by the leading sire Danehill. He was named after the Rock of Gibraltar, a monolithic limestone promontory in Gibraltar on the southern tip of the Iberian Peninsula.

== Racing career ==
=== 2001 ===
In April 2001 he won on his first outing as a two-year-old at the Curragh in Ireland and followed up with a 6th place at Ascot in England in June followed by another first place at the Curragh in July. Later in the year he had four further outings – winning at York and Newmarket in England, Longchamp Racecourse in France and finishing second back in England at Doncaster. For the 2001 season he was partnered by Irish jockey M. J. Kinnane and had won six times (two Group 1, three Group 2 and a Maiden).

=== 2002 ===
As a three-year-old he won his first race in 2002 at Newmarket, following up with four straight wins at the Curragh, Ascot, Goodwood and Longchamp. His final race was a second place in the United States at Arlington. The 2002 wins meant that he achieved the record of winning seven consecutive Group 1 races in the Northern Hemisphere. Rock of Gibraltar retired to stud at the end of the 2002 season having collected five more Group 1 wins and lifetime prize winnings (at 2002 values) of £1,269,804, ensuring that he would be a sought-after stud.

=== Trainer ===
The horse was trained by Aidan O'Brien at Ballydoyle Stables, Co. Tipperary, Ireland. O'Brien also bred him in partnership with his wife Anne-Marie and father-in-law Joe Crowley. Over the course of two seasons, Rock of Gibraltar won seven consecutive Group 1 wins before finishing second to Domedriver in the 2002 Breeders' Cup Mile. He was voted the 2002 European Horse of the Year.

=== Ownership ===
For much of his racing career, Rock of Gibraltar ran in the colours of Manchester United manager Sir Alex Ferguson, who was named as a part-owner along with Susan Magnier, wife of Coolmore owner John Magnier. Upon Rock of Gibraltar's retirement, Ferguson and John Magnier were involved in a dispute over the exact nature of the ownership of the horse. The dispute was settled out of court. The dispute led to the Glazer family gaining overall ownership and control of Manchester United in 2005.

== Stud career ==
Among Rock of Gibraltar's offspring were Hong Kong Cup winner and Epsom Derby runner-up Eagle Mountain, and Group One winners Samitar, Seventh Rock, Mount Nelson, Varenar, Society Rock and Big Rock.

== Race record ==
Date	Course	Distance	Race	Class	Position	Jockey	Odds
21 April 2001	Curragh, IRE	5 furlongs	First Flier E.B.F. Maiden	Maiden (2yo)	1st of 6	M J Kinane	11/10F
19 June 2001	Ascot, GB	6 furlongs	Coventry Stakes	Group 3 (2yo)	6th of 20	M J Kinane	10/1
1 July 2001	Curragh, IRE	6 furlongs	Railway Stakes	Group 3 (2yo)	1st of 7	M J Kinane	1/2F
22 August 2001	York, GB	6 furlongs	Gimcrack Stakes	Group 2 (2yo)	1st of 9	M J Kinane	11/4
14 September 2001	Doncaster, GB	7 furlongs	Champagne Stakes	Group 2 (2yo)	2nd of 8	M J Kinane	11/10
7 October 2001	Longchamp, FR	1400 meters	Grand Critérium	Group 1 (2yo)	1st of 5	M J Kinane	4/5J
20 October 2001	Newmarket, GB	7 furlongs	Dewhurst Stakes	Group 1 (2yo)	1st of 8	M J Kinane	4/6F
4 May 2002	Newmarket, GB	1 mile	2000 Guineas	Group 1 (3yo)	1st of 22	Johnny Murtagh	9/1
25 May 2002	Curragh, IRE	1 mile	Irish 2,000 Guineas	Group 1 (3yo)	1st of 7	M J Kinane	4/7F
18 June 2002	Ascot, GB	1 mile	St. James's Palace Stakes	Group 1 (3yo)	1st of 9	M J Kinane	4/5F
31 July 2002	Goodwood, GB	1 mile	Sussex Stakes	Group 1 (3yo+)	1st of 5	M J Kinane	8/13F
8 September 2002	Longchamp, FR	1600 meters	Prix du Moulin de Longchamp	Group 1 (3yo+)	1st of 7	M J Kinane	3/5J
26 October 2002	Arlington Park, USA	1 mile	Breeders' Cup Mile	Group 1 (3yo+)	2nd of 14	M J Kinane	4/5F

Source: "Rock Of Gibraltar (IRE)". The Racing Post.

== Pedigree ==
Pedigree of Rock of Gibraltar
Sire Danehill	Danzig	Northern Dancer	Nearctic
Sire Danehill	Danzig	Northern Dancer	Natalma
Sire Danehill	Danzig	Pas de Nom	Admiral's Voyage
Sire Danehill	Danzig	Pas de Nom	Petitioner
Sire Danehill	Razyana	His Majesty	Ribot
Sire Danehill	Razyana	His Majesty	Flower Bowl
Sire Danehill	Razyana	Spring Adieu	Buckpasser
Sire Danehill	Razyana	Spring Adieu	Natalma
Dam Offshore Boom	Be My Guest	Northern Dancer	Nearctic
Dam Offshore Boom	Be My Guest	Northern Dancer	Natalma
Dam Offshore Boom	Be My Guest	What a Treat	Tudor Minstrel
Dam Offshore Boom	Be My Guest	What a Treat	Rare Treat
Dam Offshore Boom	Push a Button	Bold Lad	Bold Ruler
Dam Offshore Boom	Push a Button	Bold Lad	Barn Pride
Dam Offshore Boom	Push a Button	River Lady	Prince John
Dam Offshore Boom	Push a Button	River Lady	Nile Lady

- Rock of Gibraltar is inbred 3 × 3 to Northern Dancer. This also means that Rock of Gibraltar is inbred to Nearctic and Natalma 4 x 4, however like all of Danehill's offspring Rock of Gibraltar is inbred 4 × 4 to the mare Natalma. As a result of this Rock of Gibraltar is inbred 4 × 4 x 4 to Natalma.
