= Society Rock =

Irish-bred Thoroughbred racehorse

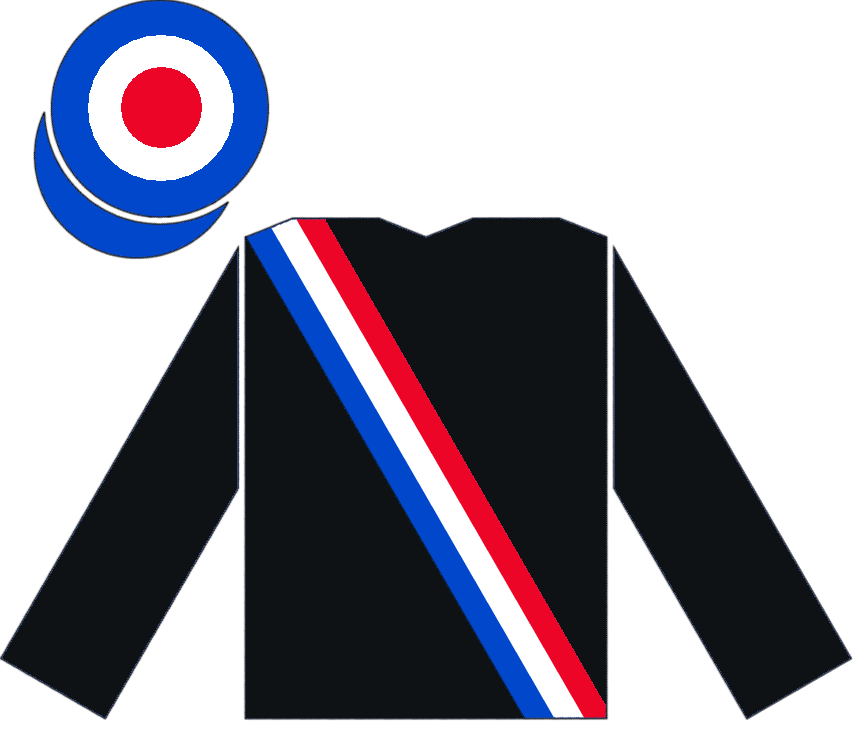
- Racing silks of Simon Gibson
- Sire: Rock of Gibraltar
- Grandsire: Danehill
- Dam: High Society
- Damsire: Key Of Luck
- Sex: Stallion
- Foaled: 8 February 2007
- Died: 31 May 2016
- Country: Ireland
- Colour: Bay
- Breeder: San Gabriel Investments
- Owner: Simon Gibson
- Trainer: James Fanshawe
- Record: 23: 6-6-2
- Earnings: £1,043,732

Major wins
- Pavilion Stakes (2010); Golden Jubilee Stakes (2011); Haydock Sprint Cup (2012); Duke of York Stakes (2013)

Society Rock (8 February 2007 – 31 May 2016) was an Irish-bred, British-trained Thoroughbred racehorse who won the Golden Jubilee Stakes and Haydock Sprint Cup. He was owned by Simon Gibson and trained by James Fanshawe.

== Breeding ==
Society Rock is the son of Rock of Gibraltar who won seven Group 1 races in a row, including the 2000 Guineas. Rock of Gibraltar has sired a number of other top racehorses, including Eclipse Stakes winner Mount Nelson and Prix de la Forêt winner Varenar. Society Rock's dam is High Society, a daughter of Key Of Luck. His stable name is Rocky.

== Racing career ==
=== Early career ===
In Society Rock's early days he was given the stable name of Rocky then Society Rock (Rocky) won two of his four starts as a two-year-old, including the valuable Tattersalls Timeform Millions Sprint at Newmarket. He won the Listed Pavilion Stakes at Ascot in his first run as a three-year-old. After finishing second in another listed contest he stepped up to the highest class for the Golden Jubilee Stakes at Royal Ascot. Ridden by Pat Cosgrave, he started as a 50/1 outsider. He was held up near the rear of the field in the early stages, but came through the pack to finish in second place, 1¾ lengths behind winner Starspangledbanner. In his last start of the season he finished seventh in the July Cup.

=== 2011: four-year-old season ===
Society Rock started the 2011 season by finishing tenth in the Abernant Stakes and then second to Bated Breath in a five-runner race at Haydock Park. He then went so Royal Ascot for the Golden Jubilee Stakes again. Ridden again by Pat Cosgrave, who had been his jockey for every race since Royal Ascot the previous year, he started at 25/1. Again he was held up near the rear, coming through to challenge the leaders in the final furlong. He stayed on well to take the lead in the final 75 yards and went on to win by half a length from Monsieur Chevalier, with Star Witness in third place. After Ascot, Society Rock finished second to Moonlight Cloud in the Prix Maurice de Gheest. He finished four lengths behind the winner, but the horses behind him included Dream Ahead and Zoffany. He then finished sixth behind Dream Ahead in the Haydock Sprint Cup, followed by two disappointing efforts in the British Champions Sprint Stakes and Hong Kong Sprint.

=== 2012: five-year-old season ===
Society Rock started his five-year-old season by finishing third in the Duke of York Stakes, less than half a length behind winner Tiddliwinks. He then went to Royal Ascot for the third successive year. He ran in the same race again, which had been renamed to the Diamond Jubilee Stakes in honour of the Diamond Jubilee of Elizabeth II. The 1/6 favourite for the race was the Australian mare Black Caviar. Society Rock started at 8/1 and was ridden by Johnny Murtagh. He missed the start and was at the very rear of the field, but made up ground in the final furlong to finish in fifth place, about two lengths behind winner Black Caviar. After this run he was made favourite for the July Cup, which was run on heavy ground. In the race he finished in third, 6 lengths behind surprise winner Mayson. Society Rock then started the Haydock Sprint Cup at 10/1 and was ridden by Kieren Fallon. Fallon settled him in the midfield and made up ground in the last furlong and a half. He then ran on to take the lead with 75 yards to run and went on to win by ¾ length from Gordon Lord Byron, with Bated Breath a further 1¼ lengths back in third. Fallon commented after the race "He's like a little terrier and tries very hard, which is what you need in a race like this."

In the British Champions Sprint Stakes on Champions Day at Ascot (20 October) Society Rock came home fifth of the fifteen runners behind Maarek.

=== 2013: six-year-old season ===
Society Rock ran three times as a six-year-old. He won the Duke of York Stakes in May and finished second to Lethal Force in both the Diamond Jubilee Stakes and the July Cup.

== Stud record ==
Society Rock was retired from racing to become a breeding stallion at the Tally-Ho Stud in County Westmeath. His offspring included Unfortunately, A'Ali (Prix Robert Papin) and The Mackem Bullet (Appalachian Stakes).

Society Rock died after succumbing to a bout of laminitis in May 2016.

== Pedigree ==
Pedigree of Society Rock, bay stallion, 2007
Sire Rock of Gibraltar (IRE) b. 1999	Danehill b. 1986	Danzig* b. 1977	Northern Dancer*
Sire Rock of Gibraltar (IRE) b. 1999	Danehill b. 1986	Danzig* b. 1977	Pas de Nom
Sire Rock of Gibraltar (IRE) b. 1999	Danehill b. 1986	Razyana b. 1981	His Majesty
Sire Rock of Gibraltar (IRE) b. 1999	Danehill b. 1986	Razyana b. 1981	Spring Adieu
Sire Rock of Gibraltar (IRE) b. 1999	Offshore Boom ch. 1985	Be My Guest ch. 1974	Northern Dancer*
Sire Rock of Gibraltar (IRE) b. 1999	Offshore Boom ch. 1985	Be My Guest ch. 1974	What a Treat
Sire Rock of Gibraltar (IRE) b. 1999	Offshore Boom ch. 1985	Push a Button b. 1980	Bold Lad
Sire Rock of Gibraltar (IRE) b. 1999	Offshore Boom ch. 1985	Push a Button b. 1980	River Lady
Dam High Society (IRE) b. 1999	Key Of Luck b. 1991	Chief's Crown b. 1982	Danzig*
Dam High Society (IRE) b. 1999	Key Of Luck b. 1991	Chief's Crown b. 1982	Six Crowns
Dam High Society (IRE) b. 1999	Key Of Luck b. 1991	Balnonella b. 1984	Gay Mecene
Dam High Society (IRE) b. 1999	Key Of Luck b. 1991	Balnonella b. 1984	Bamieres
Dam High Society (IRE) b. 1999	Ela's Gold b. 1990	Ela-Mana-Mou b. 1976	Pitcairn
Dam High Society (IRE) b. 1999	Ela's Gold b. 1990	Ela-Mana-Mou b. 1976	Rose Bertin
Dam High Society (IRE) b. 1999	Ela's Gold b. 1990	Majestic's Gold b. 1978	Rheingold
Dam High Society (IRE) b. 1999	Ela's Gold b. 1990	Majestic's Gold b. 1978	Majestic

Note: b. = Bay, ch. = Chestnut

* Society Rock is inbred 3 × 4 to Danzig. This means that the stallion appears once in the third generation and once in the fourth generation of his pedigree. He is also 4x4 inbred to Northern Dancer.
