= Eagle Mountain (horse) =

British-bred Thoroughbred racehorse

- Sire: Rock of Gibraltar
- Grandsire: Danehill
- Dam: Masskana
- Damsire: Darshaan
- Sex: Gelding
- Foaled: 25 February 2004
- Country: United Kingdom
- Colour: Bay or brown
- Breeder: London Thoroughbred Services
- Trainer: Aidan O'Brien; Mike de Kock; Stephen McKee
- Record: 23: 5-7-1
- Earnings: £1,794,242

Major wins
- Beresford Stakes (2006); Royal Whip Stakes (2007); Joel Stakes (2008); Hong Kong Cup (2008)

Eagle Mountain (born 25 February 2004) is a British Thoroughbred racehorse who won the Hong Kong Cup and came second in the Epsom Derby.

== Background ==
Eagle Mountain is owned by Sheikh Mohammed Bin Khalifa Al Maktoum. He was sired by seven-time group one winner Rock of Gibraltar and out of the mare Masskana.

== Racing career ==
In his two-year-old season in 2006, Eagle Mountain won the Group 2 Beresford Stakes, finished second in the Futurity Stakes and Champagne Stakes, and finished fourth in the Racing Post Trophy.

As a three-year-old in 2007, he won the Group 2 Royal Whip Stakes, finished fifth in the 2000 Guineas, second in the Epsom Derby, third in the Irish Derby, second in the Champion Stakes, second in the York Stakes.

=== 2008: Four-Year-Old Season ===
When he was a four-year-old, Eagle Mountain was sold and Mike De Kock trained him.

He then won the Group 3 Joel Stakes at Newmarket Racecourse, setting a new record for the fastest finish on the Rowley Mile course.

His next race was a second place finish in the Breeders' Cup Turf.

He went on to win the 2009 Hong Kong Cup by 1 1/4 lengths and then was retired. He had earned $3,521,721 in winnings.

=== Later career ===
In New Zealand, Eagle Mountain was found to be infertile, so returned to racing and came fifth in the 2009 Hong Kong Cup.

He came second in a race at Meydan Racecourse in February 2010, and injured his tendon while training after the race and retired in March.

All attempts at racing in New Zealand as an eight-year-old were unsuccessful.
