= Invermark Lodge =

Hunting lodge in Angus, Scotland

Coordinates: 56.9129°N 2.9266°W

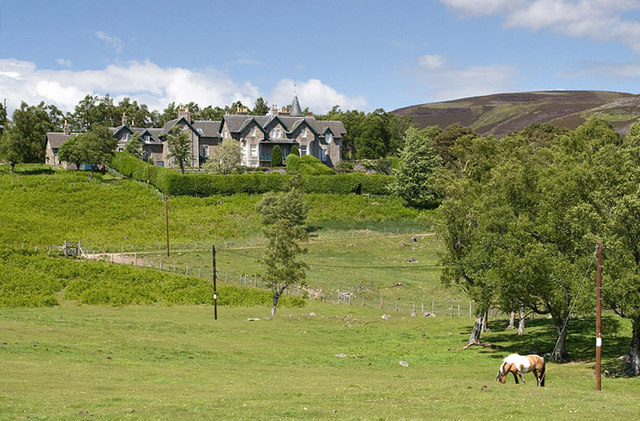

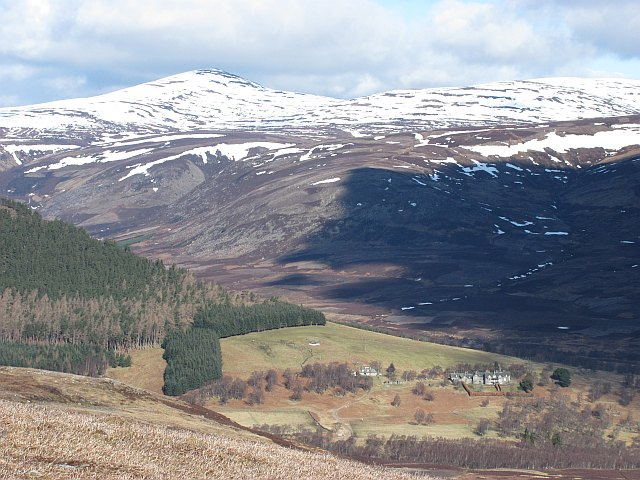

Invermark Lodge is a hunting lodge which was built near Invermark Castle in 1852 for John Ramsay, 13th Earl of Dalhousie. It is now a listed building and continues to be operated as a grouse moor by the Dalhousie family.
