= James Fanshawe =

British racehorse trainer

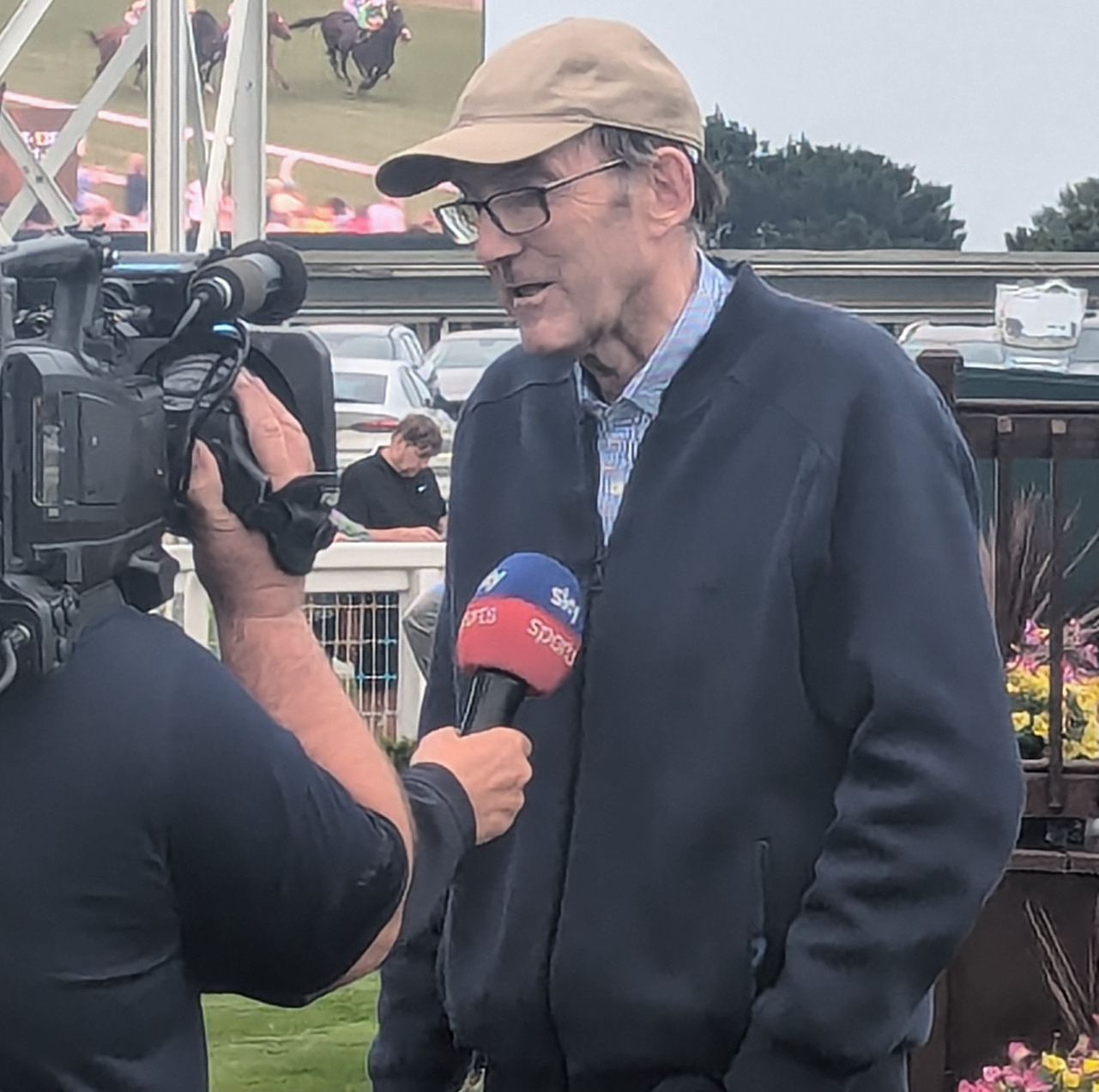
- Fanshawe in 2024

Personal information
- Born: 1961 (age 64–65)
- Occupation: Trainer

Horse racing career
- Sport: Horse racing

James Fanshawe is a British racehorse trainer. Based at Pegasus Stables in Newmarket, he has saddled 26 Group 1 winners. Although training horses mainly on the flat, he holds a dual licence and trained two winners of the Champion Hurdle.

== Background ==
Fanshawe was born into an equestrian family. His father Brian Fanshawe was an amateur jockey who won the 1967 National Hunt Chase on Master Tammy and his grandfather was the equestrian Richard Fanshawe. Fanshawe was a boarder at Stowe School. Having worked for National Hunt trainers George Fairbairn and Josh Gifford as well as his aunt's husband David Nicholson, he moved to Newmarket and worked for flat trainer Michael Stoute.

== Career ==
Fanshawe took out his own licence in 1990 to train at Pegasus Stables, the yard that had been built by jockey Fred Archer. He saddled his first winner, Black Sapphire, at Salisbury in May 1990. Later that year, he achieved his first Group race success when Radwell won the group 3 Solario Stakes. The following season Environment Friend won the Eclipse Stakes to provide him with his first Group 1 win.

Holding a dual purpose licence to train horses on the flat and over jumps, Fanshawe sent out Royal Gait to win the Champion Hurdle at the 1992 Cheltenham Festival. Ten years later Hors La Loi III won the same race.

In September 2000, Arctic Owl won the Irish St. Leger, providing Fanshawe with his only British or Irish Classic victory. The mare Soviet Song provided the yard with five Group 1 victories between 2002 and 2006. Fanshawe had his most successful year in terms of wins in 2002, with 58 wins at a strike rate of 22 per cent. His most successful year in terms of prize money was 2004. During the 2010s Society Rock, Seal of Approval, Ribbons, High Jinx and Speedy Boarding contributed to Fanshawe's success at the highest level. Between 2015 and 2020, stable star The Tin Man (given Fred Archer's nickname) won nine of his 31 starts, including three Group 1 wins. In 2020, Audarya won the Prix Jean Romanet and the Breeders' Cup Filly & Mare Turf.

== Personal life ==
Fanshawe is married to Jacko, who takes an active part in running Pegasus stables. The couple's son Tom rode The Tin Man at home.

== Major wins ==
(United Kingdom) Great Britain

- British Champions Fillies' and Mares' Stakes – (1) – Seal of Approval (2013)
- British Champions Sprint Stakes – (3) – Deacon Blues (2011), The Tin Man (2016), Kind Of Blue (2024)
- Champion Hurdle – (2) – Royal Gait (1992), Hors La Loi III (2002)
- Diamond Jubilee Stakes – (1) – The Tin Man (2017)
- Eclipse Stakes – (1) – Environment Friend (1991)
- Falmouth Stakes – (3) – Macadamia (2003), Soviet Song (2004, 2005)
- Fillies' Mile – (1) – Soviet Song (2002)
- Golden Jubilee Stakes – (1) – Society Rock (2011)
- Haydock Sprint Cup – (2) – Society Rock (2012), The Tin Man (2018)
- July Cup – (1) – Frizzante (2004)
- Sussex Stakes – (1) – Soviet Song (2004)

France

- Prix de l'Opéra – (1) – Speedy Boarding (2016)
- Prix du Cadran – (2) – Invermark (1998), High Jinx (2014)
- Prix Jean Romanet – (3) – Ribbons (2014), Speedy Boarding (2016), Audarya (2020)

(Republic of Ireland) Ireland

- Irish St. Leger – (1) – Arctic Owl (2000)
- Matron Stakes – (1) – Soviet Song (2004)

Canada

- E. P. Taylor Stakes – (1) – Wandering Star (1996)

United States

- Breeders' Cup Filly & Mare Turf – (1) – Audarya (2020)
