= Bay City Roller =

British Thoroughbred racehorse

- Sire: New Bay
- Grandsire: Dubawi
- Dam: Bloomfield
- Damsire: Teofilo
- Sex: Stallion
- Foaled: 6 February 2022 (age 4)
- Country: Ireland
- Colour: Bay
- Breeder: John Connaughton
- Owner: Victorious Forever
- Racing colours
- Trainer: George Scott
- Jockey: Oisin Murphy
- Record: 17: 5-8-1
- Earnings: £2,188,765

Major wins
- Grosser Preis von Bayern (2025); Coronation Cup (2026)

Bay City Roller (foaled 6 February 2022) is an Irish Thoroughbred racehorse.

He was undefeated over 3 races in his 2-year old season. As a 3-year old, he initially went winless, with four second places, before winning the German Grosser Preis von Bayern by 7 lengths. As a 4-year old, he placed second in the Tattersalls Gold Cup and Prix de l'Arc de Triomphe, and won the Coronation Cup by 10 lengths.

== Racing form ==
The below data is from Timeform and Racing Post..

Date	Race name	D(f)	Course	Class	Prize	Odds	Runners	Place	Margin (L)	Winner (Runner-up)	Time (Note: The time of the winning horse, not Bay City Roller's time.)	Jockey	Trainer
2024 – two-year-old season
31 July 2024	EBF Novice Stakes	7	Sandown	4	£5,400	9/4f	13	1st	neck	(Vecu)	1:28.23	Callum Shepherd	George Scott
29 August 2024	Novice Stakes	7	Chelmsford City	4	£5,234	4/9f	10	1st	3/4	(Rock d'Oro)	1:25.43	Callum Shepherd	George Scott
14 September 2024	Champagne Stakes	7	Doncaster	1 (G2)	£88,800	9/2	5	1st	1/2	(Monumental)	1:25.02	Callum Shepherd	George Scott
2025 – three-year-old season
29 May 2025	Heron Stakes	8	Sandown	1 (Listed)	£9,675	9/2	7	2nd	2 1/2	Opera Ballo	1:42.45	Callum Shepherd	George Scott
29 June 2025	Prix Eugène Adam	10	Saint-Cloud	1 (G2)	£23,636.36	58/10	6	2nd	3/4	Daryz	2:09.81	Callum Shepherd	George Scott
26 July 2025	York Stakes	10	York	1 (G2)	£2,025	12/1	7	6th	6 3/4	Royal Champion	2:05.64	Callum Shepherd	George Scott
7 September 2025	Prix Niel	12	Longchamp	1 (G2)	£21,636.36	16/1	8	2nd	short neck	Caulificar	2:30.56	Callum Shepherd	George Scott
4 October 2025	Prix Dollar	10	Longchamp	1 (G2)	£33,272.73	12/5f	8	2nd	1 1/4	First Look	2:05.61	Oisin Murphy	George Scott
19 October 2025	Prix du Conseil de Paris	11	Longchamp	1 (G2)	£6,884.30	42/10	7	4th	3	Convergent	2:17.02	Mickael Barzalona	George Scott
8 November 2025	Grosser Preis von Bayern	12	Munich	1 (G1)	£82,644.63	106/10	8	1st	7	(Tiffany)	2:38.13	Adrie de Vries	George Scott
2026 – four-year-old season
8 May 2026	Huxley Stakes	10	Chester	1 (G2)	£36,550	9/2	9	2nd	neck	Lambourn	2:08.77	Oisin Murphy	George Scott
24 May 2026	Tattersalls Gold Cup	10 1/2	Curragh	1 (G1)	€94,500	15/2	7	2nd	2	Almaqam	2:06.80	Oisin Murphy	George Scott
6 June 2026	Coronation Cup	12	Epsom Downs	1 (G1)	£560,200	17/2	6	1st	10	(Jan Brueghel)	2:40.08	Oisin Murphy	George Scott
6 September 2026	Prix Foy	12	Longchamp	1 (G2)	£22,765.22	29/10	4	2nd	1 3/4	Daryz	2:30.89	Oisin Murphy	George Scott
4 October 2026	Prix de l'Arc de Triomphe	12	Longchamp	1 (G1)	£993,913.04	38/1	16	2nd	1 1/4	Daryz	2:27.11	Oisin Murphy	George Scott
17 October 2026	Champion Stakes	10	Ascot	1 (G1)	£139,880	17/2	6	3rd	5 1/2	Ombudsman	2:04.22	Oisin Murphy	George Scott
31 October 2026	Breeders' Cup Turf	12	Keeneland	1 (G1)	£74,074.07	5/1	14	6th	2 3/4	Benvenuto Cellini	2:27.50	Oisin Murphy	George Scott

== Pedigree ==
Pedigree of Bay City Roller
Sire New Bay ch. 2012	Dubawi b. 2002	Dubai Millennium	Seeking the Gold
Sire New Bay ch. 2012	Dubawi b. 2002	Dubai Millennium	Colorado Dancer
Sire New Bay ch. 2012	Dubawi b. 2002	Zomaradah	Deploy
Sire New Bay ch. 2012	Dubawi b. 2002	Zomaradah	Jawaher
Sire New Bay ch. 2012	Cinnamon Bay ch. 2004	Zamindar	Gone West
Sire New Bay ch. 2012	Cinnamon Bay ch. 2004	Zamindar	Zaizafon
Sire New Bay ch. 2012	Cinnamon Bay ch. 2004	Trellis Bay	Sadler's Wells
Sire New Bay ch. 2012	Cinnamon Bay ch. 2004	Trellis Bay	Bahamian
Dam Bloomfield b. 2014	Teofilo b. 2004	Galileo	Sadler's Wells
Dam Bloomfield b. 2014	Teofilo b. 2004	Galileo	Urban Sea
Dam Bloomfield b. 2014	Teofilo b. 2004	Speirbhean	Danehill
Dam Bloomfield b. 2014	Teofilo b. 2004	Speirbhean	Saviour
Dam Bloomfield b. 2014	Ramona b. 1999	Desert King	Danehill
Dam Bloomfield b. 2014	Ramona b. 1999	Desert King	Sabaah
Dam Bloomfield b. 2014	Ramona b. 1999	Rahaam	Secreto
Dam Bloomfield b. 2014	Ramona b. 1999	Rahaam	Fager's Glory

Bay City Roller is inbred S4 × D4 to the stallion Sadler's Wells, meaning he appears once in the fourth generation on the sire's side and once in the fourth generation on the dam's side. He is also inbred D4 × D4 to Danehill, S5 × S5 × S5 to Mr. Prospector and S5 × D5 × D5 to Northern Dancer.
