= 2025 Epsom Derby =

- Epsom Derby
- Location: Epsom Downs Racecourse
- Date: 7 June 2025
- Winning horse: Lambourn
- Starting price: 13–2
- Jockey: Wayne Lordan
- Trainer: Aidan O'Brien
- Owner: Derrick Smith, Susan Magnier and Michael Tabor
- Conditions: Good

The 2025 Epsom Derby was the 246th annual running of the Derby horse race and took place at Epsom Downs Racecourse on 7 June 2025. The race was won by the third favourite, Lambourn, an Irish-bred bay colt, owned by Derrick Smith, Susan Magnier and Michael Tabor, trained at Ballydoyle in Ireland by Aidan O'Brien and ridden by Wayne Lordan. The colt's win was the first for his jockey and a record-extending eleventh win for O'Brien.

== The contenders ==
Nineteen three-year-old colts were declared for the Derby but the 2000 Guineas winner Ruling Court was withdrawn on the morning of the race as his connections felt that he would be unsuited by the ground conditions. The favourite for the race was Delacroix, trained in Ireland by Aidan O'Brien, a colt who had looked impressive in winning both his races of 2025. O'Brien also saddled Lambourn, the winner of the Chester Vase and The Lion In Winter who had been favourite for the race over the winter but run poorly on his previous start. The fourth Irish entry, trained by O'Brien's son Joseph, was Tennessee Stud, the winner of the Group 1 Criterium de Saint-Cloud. The two French challenegers were the Prix Greffulhe winner Midak, representing the stable of the late Aga Khan IV and the Juddmonte-owned outsider New Ground.

The two best-fancied of the English runners came from the Hampshire stable of Ralph Beckett: Pride of Arras had won the Dante Stakes while Stanhope Gardens had run second to Delacroix in the Autumn Stakes. The only others to start at odds of less than 50/1 were Tornado Alert (fourth in the 2000 Guineas), Nightwalker (third in the Autumn Stakes) and Tuscan Hills (Silver Tankard Stakes).

== Race card ==
No	Horse	Weight (st–lb)	Jockey	Trainer	Owner
1	Al Wasl Storm (IRE)	9–0	David Probert	Owen Burrows	Green Team Racing
2	Damysus	9–0	James Doyle	John & Thady Gosden	Wathnan Racing
3	Delacroix (IRE)	9–0	Ryan Moore	Aidan O'Brien (IRE)	Tabor / Smith / Magnier
4	Green Storm (IRE)	9–0	Billy Loughnane	Charlie Johnston	Ahmad Al Shaikh
5	Lambourn (IRE)	9–0	Wayne Lordan	Aidan O'Brien (IRE)	Tabor / Smith / Magnier
6	Lazy Griff (GER)	9–0	Christophe Soumillon	Charlie Johnston	Middleham Park Racing & G Griffiths
7	Midak (FRA)	9–0	Mickael Barzalona	Francis-Henri Graffard (FRA)	Aga Khan Studs
8	New Ground	9–0	Alexis Pouchin	Henri Francois Devin (FRA)	Juddmonte
9	Nightime Dancer (IRE)	9–0	Jamie Spencer	Richard Hannon Jr.	Stall Perlen
10	Nightwalker	9–0	Tom Marquand	John & Thady Gosden	Juddmonte
11	Pride of Arras (IRE)	9–0	Rossa Ryan	Ralph Beckett	Mrs David Aykroyd
12	Rogue Impact	9–0	Luke Morris	James Owen	The Rogues Gallery
13	Ruling Court	9–0	William Buick	Charlie Appleby	Godolphin
14	Sea Scout (IRE)	9–0	Harry Davies	Simon & Ed Crisford	Abdulla Al Mansoori
15	Stanhope Gardens (IRE)	9–0	Hector Crouch	Ralph Beckett	Marcstown Ltd And New Chelsea
16	Tennessee Stud (IRE)	9–0	Dylan Browne McMonagle	Joseph Patrick O'Brien (IRE)	Westerberg / Tabor / Smith / Magnier
17	The Lion In Winter (IRE)	9–0	Colin Keane	Aidan O'Brien (IRE)	Tabor / Smith / Magnier
18	Tornado Alert (IRE)	9–0	Oisin Murphy	Saeed bin Suroor	Godolphin
19	Tuscan Hills (FRA)	9–0	David Egan	Raphael Freire	Amo Racing

Trainers are based in Great Britain unless indicated.

== The race ==
The Derby was run on a cloudy, wet day on ground officially described as good in front of an unusually small paying crowd of 22,312. Lambourn took the lead soon after the start and set the pace from Sea Scout with Lazy Griff and Midak settled just behind the leaders. The leading positions remained unchanged until the turn into the straight when Sea Scout and Midak began to struggle, allowing Lambourn to open up a clear lead with Lazy Griff moving into second place. Lambourn never looked in any danger and stayed on strongly to win by three and three quarter lengths from Lazy Griff. Stanhope Gardens moved into third place inside the final quarter mile but was overtaken by Tennessee Stud and New Ground in the final strides. The favourite Delacroix was never in contention and finished ninth. In describing the race the Racing Post's David Jennings commented "Can you remember a less dramatic Derby? Literally nothing happened. Anywhere. At any stage. Lambourn broke well, made all, unchallenged."

== Full result ==
	Dist *	Horse	Jockey	Trainer	SP
1		Lambourn	Wayne Lordan	Aidan O'Brien (IRE)	13/2
2	3¾	Lazy Griff	Christophe Soumillon	Charlie Johnston	50/1
3	1	Tennessee Stud	Dylan Browne McMonagle	Joseph Patrick O'Brien (IRE)	28/1
4	nk	New Ground	Alexis Pouchin	Henri-Francois Devin (FRA)	50/1
5	nk	Stanhope Gardens	Hector Crouch	Ralph Beckett	12/1
6	3	Tornado Alert	Oisin Murphy	Saeed bin Suroor	40/1
7	1¼	Green Storm	Billy Loughnane	Charlie Johnston	50/1
8	½	Nightime Dancer	Jamie Spencer	Richard Hannon, Jr.	100/1
9	6	Delacroix	Ryan Moore	Aidan O'Brien (IRE)	2/1F
10	nk	Midak	Mickael Barzalona	Francis-Henri Graffard (FRA)	9/1
11	¾	Sea Scout	Harry Davies	Simon & Ed Crisford	125/1
12	6	Nightwalker	Tom Marquand	John & Thady Gosden	40/1
13	2	Rogue Impact	Luke Morris	James Owen	200/1
14	2½	The Lion In Winter	Colin Keane	Aidan O'Brien (IRE)	7/1
15	13	Al Wasl Storm	David Probert	Owen Burrows	50/1
16	2¼	Tuscan Hills	David Egan	Raphael Freire	40/1
17	7½	Pride of Arras	Rossa Ryan	Ralph Beckett	4/1
18	1¾	Damysus	James Doyle	John & Thady Gosden	16/1

* The distances between the horses are shown in lengths or shorter; hd = head.
† Trainers are based in Great Britain unless indicated.

== Winner details ==
Further details of the winner:

- Foaled: 24 April 2022
- Sire: Australia
- Owner: Tabor / Smith / Magnier
- Breeder: Coolmore Stud

== Form analysis ==
=== Two-year-old races ===
Notable runs by the future Derby participants as two-year-olds in 2024

- Delacroix – 1st in Autumn Stakes, 2nd in Futurity Trophy, 2nd in Juvenile Stakes.
- Green Storm – 2nd in Zetland Stakes, 2nd in Critérium de Saint-Cloud.
- Lambourn – 1st in Criterium de l'Ouest.
- Lazy Griff – 1st in Prix de Conde.
- Nightwalker – 3rd in Autumn Stakes.
- Stanhope Gardens – 2nd in Autumn Stakes.
- Tennessee Stud – 1st in Critérium de Saint-Cloud, 2nd in Beresford Stakes.
- The Lion In Winter – 1st in Acomb Stakes.
- Tuscan Hills – 1st in Silver Tankard Stakes.

=== Road to Epsom ===
Early-season appearances in 2025 and trial races prior to running in the Derby:

- Damysus – 2nd in Sandown Classic Trial, 3rd in Dante Stakes.
- Delacroix – 1st in Ballysax Stakes, 1st in Leopardstown Derby Trial.
- Lambourn – 1st in Chester Vase.
- Lazy Griff – 2nd in Chester Vase.
- Midak – 1st in Prix Greffulhe.
- New Ground – 3rd in Prix La Force, 3rd in Prix de Suresnes.
- Nightime Dancer – 3rd in Lingfield Derby Trial.
- Nightwalker – 3rd in Feilden Stakes.
- Pride of Arras – 1st in Dante Stakes.
- Sea Scout – 1st in Blue Riband Trial Stakes.
- Tennessee Stud – 3rd in Leopardstown Derby Trial.
- Tornado Alert – 4th in 2,000 Guineas.

=== Subsequent Group 1 wins ===
- Delacroix - Eclipse Stakes (2025), Irish Champion Stakes (2025)
- Lambourn – Irish Derby (2025)
- Tornado Alert – Bayerisches Zuchtrennen (2025)
