= Delacroix (horse) =

Irish-bred Thoroughbred racehorse (born 2022)

- Breed: Thoroughbred
- Sire: Dubawi
- Grandsire: Dubai Millennium
- Dam: Tepin
- Damsire: Bernstein
- Sex: Stallion
- Foaled: April 2, 2022
- Country: Ireland
- Color: Bay
- Breeder: Tepin Syndicate
- Owner: Derrick Smith, Mrs. John Magnier, & Michael Tabor
- Trainer: Aidan O'Brien
- Record: 12: 6-4-0
- Earnings: $2,356,839

Major wins
- Autumn Stakes (2024); Ballysax Stakes (2025); Derby Trial (2025); Eclipse Stakes (2025); Irish Champion Stakes (2025)

Awards
- Cartier Champion Three-year-old Colt (2025); Timeform rating: 129

Delacroix (foaled April 2, 2022), is a retired champion Thoroughbred racehorse and active breeding stallion. He placed second in his debut race at Leopardstown Racecourse, and he alternated between first and second place finished in his other four races of 2025, including a graded stakes victory in the Grade 3 Autumn Stakes and then in late October 2026 was just denied victory by a nose in the prestigious Grade 1 Futurity Stakes to Hotazhell, who later won the Irish Champion Stakes a feat also achieved by Delacroix. Delacroix ended the year as one of the highest rated 2 year-olds in training. He started the 2026 season early, running in March and April with consecutive victories in the Ballysax Stakes and the Leopardstown Derby Trial, both Grade 3 races, showing high levels of acceleration. This ensured he started a short-priced favourite for the Epsom Derby, where he placed ninth. Delacroix then dropped back to 10 furlongs for the remainder of his career - initially bouncing straight back to winning with an elite performance at the Grade 1 Coral Eclipse, where he went from last to first, overtaking the champion Ombudsman for his first Grade 1 victory - Delacroix ran the last furlong in a record time for the race. In a rematch against Ombudsman at the International Stakes Delacroix suffered a 3 1/2 length loss, but he bounced back under a month later at the Irish Champion Stakes, securing his second Grade 1 victory m. Despite indications from his trainer that Delacroix might not run again after having been running since March that year, he reappeared for a final race of his 2025 season at Ascot in the Champion Stakes against the likes of champion older horses Calandagan and Ombudsman; however, Delacroix ran below form. After the race, it was announced that he would be retired to stand as a sire at Coolmore Stud in 2026, with his standing fee set to be €40,000 while in Ireland, and A$38,500 after plans to also shuttle him to Australia later in the year, where there is strong demand for stallion sons of Dubawi. Delacroix was subsequently awarded the prestigious title of Cartier Champion Three-year-old Colt for the 2025 season. As a sire, he proved the most popular new horse standing at stud in the UK and Ireland, covering 282 mares in his debut season, making him the second most popular flat racing stallion in 2026 overall in terms of mares covered.

== Background ==
Delacroix was bred by the Tepin Syndicate, a branch of Coolmore Studs, which was founded after the US champion mare Tepin was purchased by Michael Magnier for $8 million. Tepin's most famous achievements include her Breeders' Cup Mile victory, as well being named the American Champion Female Turf Horse in 2015 and 2016. Delacroix was the last of four foals by Tepin before she passed away on October 5, 2024, at the age of 12. Delacroix's sire, Dubawi, is also a champion racehorse with multiple Grade 1 victories. In addition to being a successful racer, Dubawi is a prolific stallion, having sired notable racehorses including Notable Speech and Rebel's Romance.

Delacroix is under joint ownership with partners Derrick Smith, Mrs. John (Susan) Magnier, and billionaire Michael Tabor. The three are each partners in Coolmore Stud, an enterprise founded by Susan Magnier's husband, John Magnier. Among the notable horses that have stood as stallions for Coolmore include Storm Bird, Giant's Causeway, and American Pharoah, who is currently standing at Shizunai Stallion Station in Japan.

== Racing career ==
=== 2024: Two-year-old season ===
Delacroix made his debut at a Maiden race at Leopardstown Racecourse on July 25 over a distance of 1600 meters with Ryan Moore as jockey. He stayed in the middle of the field for much of the race before beginning his acceleration at the final furlong, but he was unable to catch the leader, Green Impact, and finished the race in second. Less than a month later on August 10, Delacroix raced again, this time at Curragh Racecourse over a shorter distance of 1400 meters. Unlike his previous start, he led the entire time and finished 1 1/4 lengths ahead of second.

For his first start in a graded stakes race, Delacroix entered the Grade 2 Juvenile Stakes at Leopardstown on September 14. The Juvenile Stakes featured a small field of four runners, among whom was Green Impact. For most of the race Delacroix trailed behind Green Impact in third position, but he struggled to catch up to the two leaders in the final stretch and barely overtook Bernard Shaw in the final seconds of the race, again placing second behind Green Impact. On October 12, Delacroix ran in the Grade 3 Autumn Stakes at Newmarket Racecourse. Much like his second race, he stayed close to the front of the pack throughout the race, and in the final two furlongs he was locked in a tight battle for first with Stanhope Gardens, where he won by a neck, earning his first graded stakes victory.

== Statistics ==
Date	Distance	Race	Grade	Course	Field	Finish	Winning Time	Winning (Losing) Margin	Winner (2nd Place)	Jockey	Ref
2024 – Two-year-old season
July 25	1600m	Maiden race		Leopardstown	8	2nd	1:43.70	(1 1/2 lengths)	Green Impact	Ryan Moore	
August 10	1400m	Maiden Race		Curragh	13	1st	1:25.42	1 1/4 lengths	(Acapulco Bay)	Ryan Moore	
September 14	1600m	Juvenile Stakes	G2	Leopardstown	4	2nd	1:39.50	(1/2 length)	Green Impact	Ryan Moore	
October 12	1600m	Autumn Stakes	G3	Newmarket	6	1st	1:40:49	neck	(Stanhope Gardens)	Ryan Moore	
October 26	1600m	Futurity Trophy	G1	Doncaster	8	2nd	1:41.95	(nose)	Hotazhell	Ryan Moore	
2025 – Three-year-old season
March 30	2000m	Ballysax Stakes	G3	Leopardstown	7	1st	2:06.10	2 1/4 lengths	(Lambourn)	Ryan Moore	
May 11	2000m	Derby Trial	G3	Leopardstown	5	1st	2:10:50	2 3/4 lengths	Purview	Wayne Lordan	
June 7	2400m	Epsom Derby	G1	Epsom Downs	18	9th	2:38:50	(15 lengths)	Lambourn	Ryan Moore	
July 5	2000m	Coral Eclipse	G1	Sandown Park	6	1st	2:05.92	neck	(Ombudsman)	Ryan Moore	
August 20	2050m	International Stakes	G1	York	6	2nd	2:07.90	(3 1/2 lengths)	Ombudsman	William Buick	
September 13	2000m	Irish Champion Stakes	G1	Leopardstown	8	1st	2:04.60	3/4 length	(Anmaat)	Christophe Soumillon	
October 18	2000m	Champion Stakes	G1	Ascot	11	4th	2:03.19	4 lengths	Calandagan	Christophe Soumillon	

== Pedigree ==
Pedigree of Delacroix (IRE), bay stallion, foaled April 2, 2022
Sire Dubawi (IRE)	Dubai Millennium (GB)	Seeking the Gold (USA)	Mr. Prospector (USA)
Sire Dubawi (IRE)	Dubai Millennium (GB)	Seeking the Gold (USA)	Con Game (USA)
Sire Dubawi (IRE)	Dubai Millennium (GB)	Colorado Dancer (IRE)	Shareef Dancer (USA)
Sire Dubawi (IRE)	Dubai Millennium (GB)	Colorado Dancer (IRE)	Fall Aspen (USA)
Sire Dubawi (IRE)	Zomaradah (GB)	Deploy (GB)	Shirley Heights (GB)
Sire Dubawi (IRE)	Zomaradah (GB)	Deploy (GB)	Slightly Dangerous (USA)
Sire Dubawi (IRE)	Zomaradah (GB)	Jawaher (IRE)	Dancing Brave (USA)
Sire Dubawi (IRE)	Zomaradah (GB)	Jawaher (IRE)	High Tern (IRE)
Dam Tepin (USA)	Bernstein (USA)	Storm Cat (USA)	Storm Bird (CAN)
Dam Tepin (USA)	Bernstein (USA)	Storm Cat (USA)	Terlingua (USA)
Dam Tepin (USA)	Bernstein (USA)	La Affirmed (USA)	Affirmed (USA)
Dam Tepin (USA)	Bernstein (USA)	La Affirmed (USA)	La Mesa (USA)
Dam Tepin (USA)	Life Happened (USA)	Stravinsky (USA)	Nureyev (USA)
Dam Tepin (USA)	Life Happened (USA)	Stravinsky (USA)	Fire the Groom (USA)
Dam Tepin (USA)	Life Happened (USA)	Round it Off (USA)	Apalachee (USA)
Dam Tepin (USA)	Life Happened (USA)	Round it Off (USA)	Capp it Off (USA)
