= Calandagan =

Irish-bred, French-trained Thoroughbred racehorse

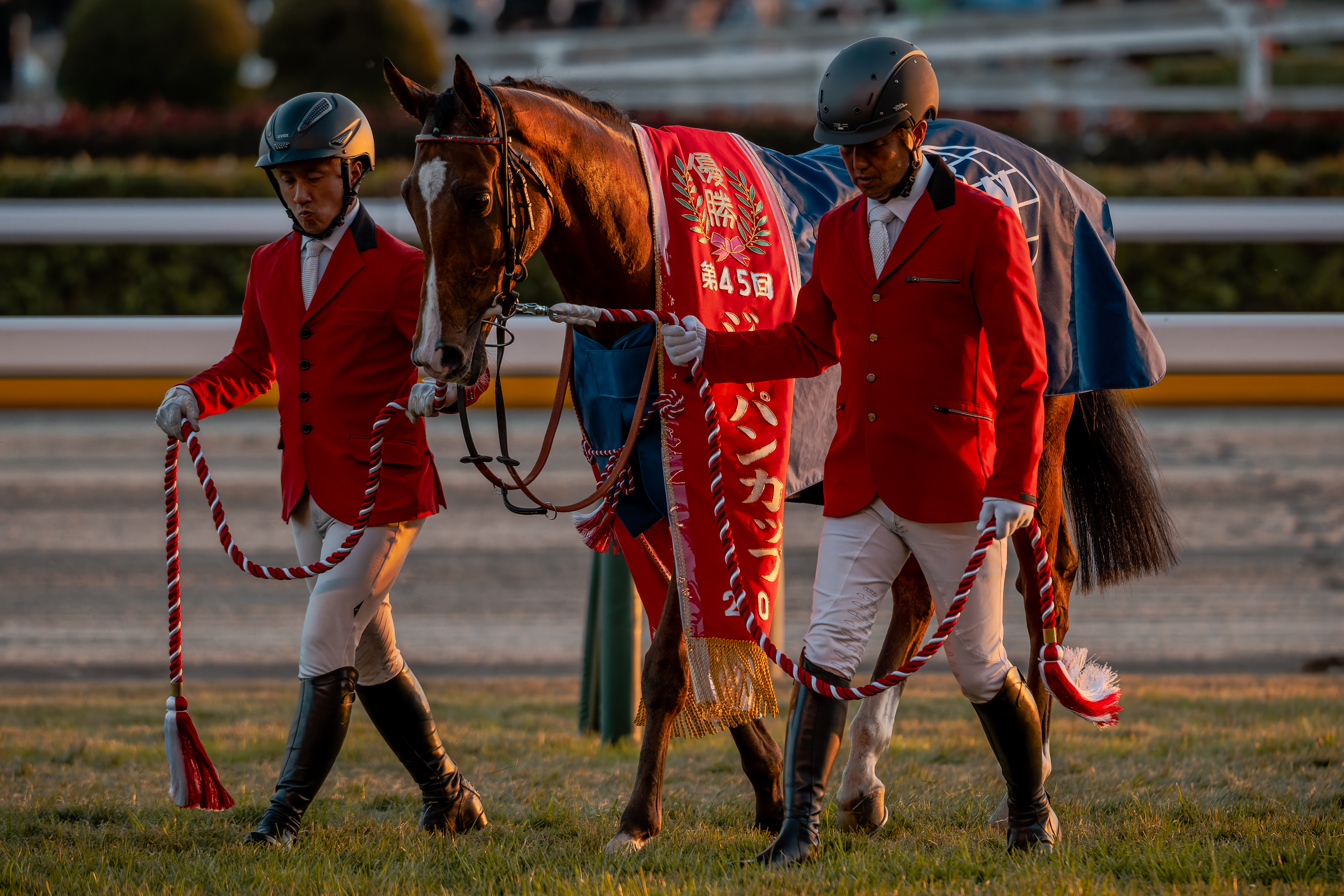
- Calandagan after winning the 2025 Japan Cup
- Breed: Thoroughbred
- Sire: Gleneagles
- Grandsire: Galileo
- Dam: Calayana
- Damsire: Sinndar
- Sex: Gelding
- Foaled: 27 January 2021 (age 5)
- Country: Ireland
- Colour: Bay
- Owner: Aga Khan Studs SCEA
- Trainer: Francis-Henri Graffard
- Record: 18: 10-6-1
- Earnings: € 9,599,366

Major wins
- Prix Noailles (2024); Prix Hocquart (2024); King Edward VII Stakes (2024); Grand Prix de Saint-Cloud (2025, 2026); King George VI and Queen Elizabeth Stakes (2025); Champion Stakes (2025); Japan Cup (2025); Dubai Sheema Classic (2026)

Awards
- IFHA World's Best Racehorse (2025); Cartier Horse of the Year (2025); Cartier Champion Older Horse (2025); JRA Special Award (2025); Timeform rating: 133

Calandagan (foaled 27 January 2021) is an active Irish-bred, French-trained champion Thoroughbred racehorse. He has won multiple Grade 1 victories across the globe, and was named the 2025 Longines World’s Best Racehorse by the International Federation of Horseracing Authorities (IFHA).

Calandagan raced twice as a two-year-old, placing 3rd in his debut before going on to win a maiden race. As a 3-year-old, Calandagan won or placed second in all six starts. Calandagan then began his four-year-old season by placing 2nd at the Dubai Sheema Classic and Coronation Cup. He went on to win the Grand Prix de Saint-Cloud, before becoming the second horse to achieve the double of the King George VI and Queen Elizabeth Stakes and Champion Stakes in the same season after Brigadier Gerard.

Following his win at the Champion Stakes, Calandagan was placed at the top of the November rankings with a Longines rating of 130, the highest of his career and the world. In November, Calandagan was awarded the Cartier Horse of the Year and Champion Older Horse award. Later in the month, he won his fourth consecutive Grade 1 victory at the Japan Cup, becoming the first foreign horse to win the race in 20 years since Alkaased and in the process breaking the world record for 2,400m on turf.

== Background ==
Calandagan was bred by Haras De Son Altesse L'Aga Khan Scea in Ireland, and was foaled on 27 January 2021. Calandagan was sired out of Gleneagles, a champion racehorse who won several Group 1 races, as well as winning the Cartier Champion Two-year-old Colt. Galileo, the grandsire of Calandagan, is the most successful sire in racing history having sired over 100 Group 1 winners, breaking the previous record of 84 winners set by Danehill.

Calandagan was trained by Francis-Henry Graffard under the ownership of Aga Khan Studs, a horse racing and breeding operation owned by 4 generations of the Aga Khan family with stud farms in Ireland and France.

== Racing career ==
=== 2023: Two-year-old season ===
Calandagan's debut race was at Deauville over 1600m on soft ground on 12 August 2023. Jockeyed by Mickael Barzalona, he finished 3 lengths and a head behind Metropolitan, a future winner of the Poule d'Essai des Poulains. After his debut race, Calandagan was gelded, with trainer Graffard saying, "As a 2-year-old, he was very difficult... We had no choice to geld him - I'd rather have a very good gelding than a bad colt."

Calandagan participated in another maiden race, this time at Chantilly over 1900m with a field of 7 racers jockeyed by Stéphane Pasquier. He led for most of the race before pulling away on the final straight to win by 10 lengths with a time of 1:55.25.

=== 2024: Three-year-old season ===
Calandagan's first race of his three-year-old season was the 2100m Prix Francois Mathet at Saint-Cloud. He stayed in the middle of the pack throughout most of the race, before moving to take the lead with about 600m left in the race. Calandagan lost his lead to Bright Picture around the 250m mark. Unable to take back the lead for the rest of the race, Calandagan came in second by 3/4 of a length.

His next race was the Group 3 Prix Noailles at Longchamp over 2100m. Unlike his previous races, Calandagan stayed at the rear for the majority of the race, and only took the lead with just over 200m to go. Much like the Prix Francois Mathet, the fight for first was between Calandagan and Bright Picture. However, this time it was Calandagan holding onto the lead with Bright Picture unable to catch up, as he won by 1 3/4 lengths. Calandagan raced again just over a month later at the 2200m Prix Hocquart with a field of 5. He waited at the rear for most of the race before surging forward in the last 250m and winning by 1 3/4 lengths.

On 21 June, Calandagan raced in his first G2 race, the King Edward VII Stakes, over 2400m on good to firm track. He got the outside draw in gate 13. Stéphane Pasquier rode quietly for most of the race, before taking the lead in the last two furlongs and winning by 6 lengths. When interviewed after the race, Graffard said, "I am very impressed... this horse did it very easily.", and that "He's not used to a big field like that... It is just unbelievable how he quickened all that way."

After his win at Ascot, Calandagan's next start was at the International Stakes in York. Calandagan was held up in the rear before powering forward in the last two furlongs of the race. Only he challenged the leader, City of Troy, going into the final furlong. However, Calandagan was unable to catch up in the end, losing by a length to City of Troy, who broke the previous track record by 0.97 seconds.

The final race of the year for Calandagan was the Qipco Champion Stakes over 2000m on 19 October 2024. Calandagan was the pre-race favorite to win, with odds of 6/4. In the final stretch of the race, Calandagan was not able to find an opening until the final furlong, where he took a slight lead before being overtaken by Anmaat in the last seconds to lose by 1/2 a length in a 40/1 upset.

=== 2025: Four-year-old season ===
==== Riding with Mickael Barzalona ====
For his 2025 season, Calandagan was no longer jockeyed by Stéphane Pasquier, and was instead by ridden by Mickael Barzalona who took over as the No. 1 jockey for Aga Khan. Their first race together was at the Dubai Sheema Classic on 5 April 2025. Calandagan was slow to start, and was mired in traffic for much of the race. He attempted a late surge to take the lead, but it was not enough to take the lead from Danon Decile who had started his kick earlier, as Calandagan placed second in a 1 1/4 length loss. After the race, Graffard stated, "He was slow out of the stalls and he takes so much time to get into his rhythm", adding, "It's a very good run and Mickael will know him more for the future, too."

In his next race, the Coronation Cup at Ascot, it was only Calandagan and Jan Brueghel challenging for first. In the final straight, Calandagan put forth a valiant effort to take the lead, but was unable to maintain this lead against Jan Brueghel. Despite being faster than Jan Brueghel in the final 3 furlongs, Calandagan was not able to reach his full potential due to Ascot's challenging uphill climb to the finish. Jan Brueghel won the race with a final time of 2:36.13, with Calandagan a half length behind. Graffard commented on the race, "I don't have any excuses. The horse had the perfect run and Mickael gave him a ride with plenty of thought.", with Barzalona adding, "I think I hit the front 100 yards before the line and he kind of just stayed on and got a bit tired going uphill. The O'Brien horse was just a little bit stronger today."

==== A streak of G1 victories ====
Having placed 2nd in four consecutive G1 races, Calandagan's team was eager to get their first group 1 victory. His next opportunity came just a couple of weeks later at the Grand Prix de Saint-Cloud with a field of 5. Calandagan remained in 4th position until he made his move around the 400m mark. There was a brief battle for first between Calandagan and Aventure, but Calandagan pulled away in the final 100m of the race to win by 3 1/2 lengths in his first G1 victory. Graffard was full of praise after Calandagan's monumental victory, saying "He's never run a bad race and he's either been beaten by a champion or circumstances. Today everything went his way and we saw how good he could be."

After his success in Saint-Cloud, Calandagan's next race was set to be the King George VI and Queen Elizabeth Stakes at Ascot, with Graffard aiming to achieve back-to-back wins in the race. The race was set to be relatively straightforward, with the 40-1 longshot Continuous designated to be the pacemaker for his stablemate Jan Brueghel, but the team behind both horses had other plans. Instead of leading the race, Continuous was held back to stay should-to-shoulder with Jan Brueghel forcing the other horses to navigate around the two. Kalpana was the first to work their way around, with Calandagan following shortly after. Similarly to his Coronation Cup race, Calandagan found himself trying to chase the leader, Kalpana. However, this time Calandagan was able to catch up with Kalpana and take the lead to win by a length. When asked about the change in tactics, Graffard responded, "What happened in the race came as a surprise... Aidan and his team put a lot of work into the tactics and it's always interesting, but Calandagan is an easy ride and I'm glad he had time to come and catch the filly."

After his consecutive victories, Calandagan was set to challenge the Juddmonte International Stakes once again, but Graffard eventually opted not to, commenting, "He [Calandagan] has big targets in Japan, Hong Kong, the Breeders' Cup and Dubai... I have to discuss it with the princess [Zahra Aga Khan], but at the moment I am probably going to go for a break with him."

Following his break, Calandagan raced on 18 October at the Qipco Champion Stakes. The field included star horses such as Ombudsman, the best racehorse in the world in the September and October Longines rankings; and Delacroix, who was awarded the Cartier Champion Three-year-old Colt award a month later. Both Calandagan and Ombudsman started the race in the very rear, and both horses simultaneously made their move around the outside of the pack nearing the two-furlong pole. However, it was Calandagan with the lead inside the final furlong, with Ombudsman about a length behind. Ombudsman desperately tried to chase down the leader, but Calandagan stayed strong and extended his lead to win the Champion Stakes by 2 1/4 lengths. Mickael Barzalona spoke after the race, "I think he's a very good horse. He deserves it. When he found his action and I was ready to go, I let him go. I could feel Ombudsman coming to me but I was going much better than him," and added, "It's been an incredible job from everyone in the yard. Everyone works very hard and it has paid off today."

==== Running at the Japan Cup ====
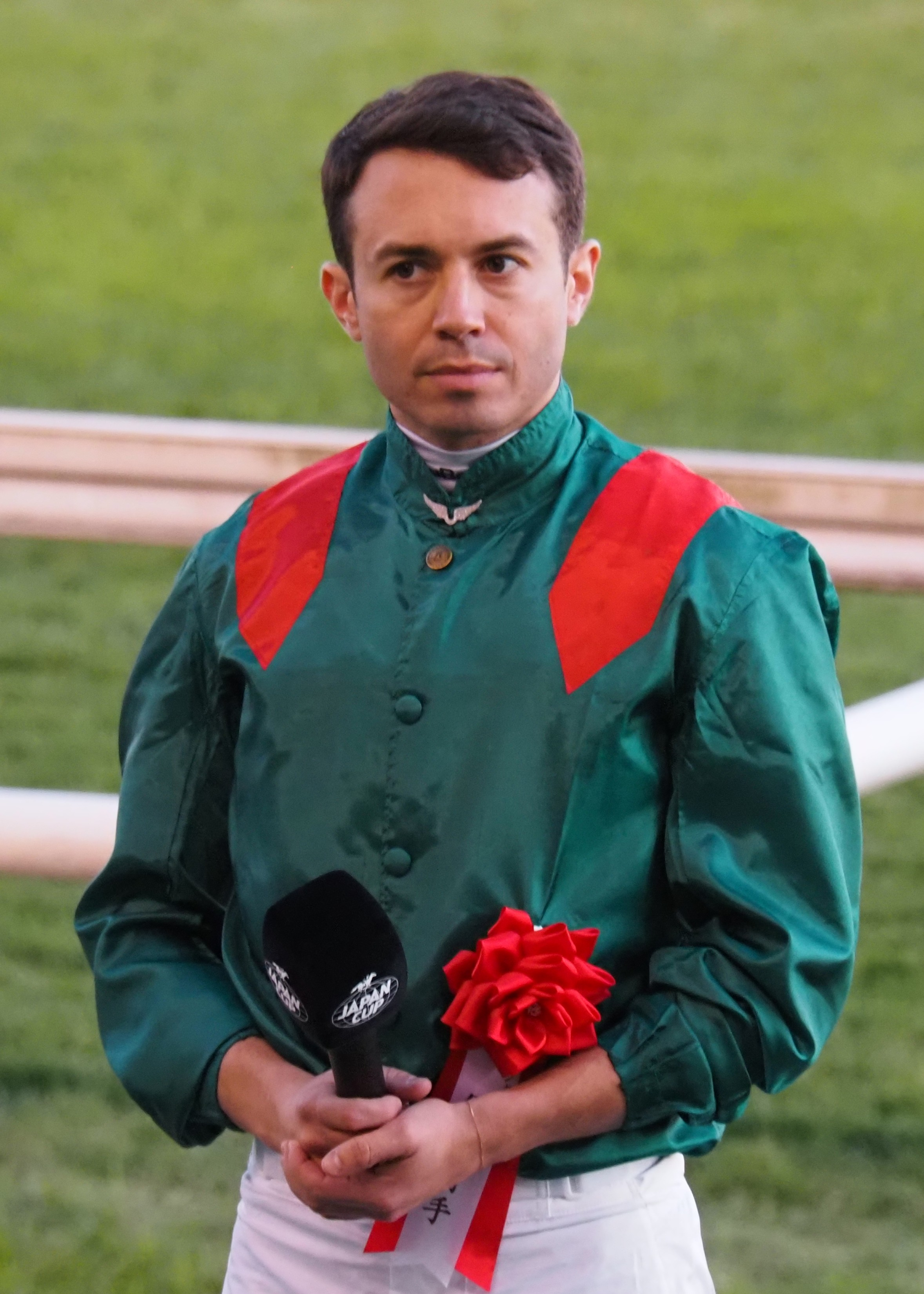
Mickael Barzalona, jockey of Calandagan, at the 2025 Japan Cup

Calandagan's next run was the Japan Cup at Tokyo Racecourse. He was originally to be joined by his stablemate Goliath, and Aidan O'Brien's Los Angeles and Queenstown, but all three horses withdrew leaving Calandagan to be the only foreign horse in the race. When asked about their preparations for Japan, stable manager Nemone Routh stated, "[Calandagan] has one more hoop to jump through... and if all goes to plan he will then take his flight and ship to Japan."

Immediately after the race started, Admire Terra threw off his jockey, disqualifying him from the race. Calandagan waited in the middle of the back third of the field for the first couple of furlongs of the race, before moving to the outside where he stayed until the final 500m. He surged forward with Masquerade Ball in the final 200m of the race, alongside Admire Terra. All three horses were within a head of each other, as the lead changed multiple times between Calandagan and Masquerade Ball. However, Calandagan took the lead by a head right before the finish, securing his victory. The official winning time of the race was 2:20.3, slightly faster than Almond Eye's track record, and the fastest time on 2400m turf, of 2:20.6. With his victory, Calandagan is the first foreign horse to win the Japan Cup since Alkaased twenty years ago, and the second ever French-trained horse to win since Le Glorieux in 1987.

After Calandagan's Japan Cup victory, trainer Francis Graffard said that:

"It's one thing bringing the best horse in the world to this race but he faced a really high-quality field. Everything seemed to go well but I was looking for Christophe Lemaire and he seemed to get a dream run through. He went a head up and I thought we were beaten but he's tough and he battled back. He's an exceptional horse to have put his head in front on the line."

Princess Zahra Aga Khan also issued a statement to the Japan Racing Association:

"It has been a very good year thanks to the people sitting next to me and the rest of the team – it's, I think, the best year we've had in a very long time... Calandagan is a good horse – he's trained and has improved throughout the year. Both Francis and Mickael know how to read the horse and bring him to the best place on the right day at the right time. It's been a great honour to win this race today and to be here. It's been truly an amazing experience."

Calandagan ended 2025 with a rating of 130, the highest rating in the world at the time. For this, he was crowned the year's World’s Best Racehorse by the International Federation of Horseracing Authorities on 20 January 2026.

=== 2026: Five-year-old season ===
On 19 March th Calandagan ran in the Dubai Sheema Classic, seeking to avenge his loss by Danon Decile from the year prior. Shortly after the race began, the field began to run in a single-file line next to the inner rail. As the race progressed, a large gap would emerge between the leader, West Wind Blows, and the rest of the field. Going into the final straight, Calandagan made his move along the outside to catch the leader. At the final 100 meter mark, Calandagan was neck and neck with West Wind Blows before taking the lead and finishing 3/4 of a length over West Wind Blows.

Due to the fact that the Dubai Sheema Classic serves as a 'win and you're in' race for the Breeders' Cup Turf, Calandagan now has an automatic entry into the race should his team choose the accept the invitation. When asked about the opportunity, Graffard stated that:

"The Breeders’ Cup could be an option and I don’t see why not, but it might depend if we go back for the Japan Cup again. They are very hard races to win and American tracks are quite tight also, so it might not really suit his abilities... The Cox Plate could be a possible especially this year at Flemington which is a big galloping track, but we don’t want to be too greedy and we need to think about it and respect the horse... I said to Princess Zahra I hope your passport is OK, because we are going to travel."

Calandagan's streak of victories came to an end at his second attempt at the Coronation Cup, finishing fourth of six racers and 41 1/2 lengths behind Bay City Roller. The event was held under unusually heavy rain conditions; the track was so waterlogged that Graffard had considering pulling Calandagan before the race, and ultimately attributed to as the reason for his horse's poor performance.

"It [was] awful ground and awful weather. My horse never travelled and I'm upset with myself. I've never seen him having a hard blow like that [after a race]. I just hope he comes out well but the ground was terrible for him today. Mickael said he never travelled comfortably and that the ground is too testing for him. I shouldn't have run him."

In the week after the race, Graffard confirmed Calandagan had recovered completely from the race and will be entering July's King George VI and Queen Elizabeth Stakes to defend his title and set up a rematch of the 2025 Japan Cup with Masquerade Ball. 3 week beforehand, Calandagan entered and won the Grand Prix de Saint Cloud for a second consecutive year.

== Statistics ==
| Date | Distance* (Condition) | Race | Class | Course | Field | Finish | Time (Note: Official time of winning horse. The time written in grey doesn't belong to Calandagan.) | Winning (Losing) Margin | Winner (2nd place) | Jockey | Ref |
|---|---|---|---|---|---|---|---|---|---|---|---|
2023 – Two-year-old season
| 12 Aug | 1600 m (Soft) | Prix de Montaigu | | Deauville | 9 | 3rd | 1:46.08 | (3 lengths) | Metropolitan | Mickael Barzalona | |
| 31 Oct | 1900 m (Standard) | Prix du Mont Cesar | | Chantilly | 7 | 1st | 1:55.25 | 10 lengths | (Silver Spur) | Stéphane Pasquier | |
2024 – Three-year-old season
| 16 Mar | 2100 m (Very Heavy) | Prix Francois Mathet | Listed | Saint-Cloud | 6 | 2nd | 2:30.55 | (3/4 length) | Bright Picture | Stéphane Pasquier | |
| 14 Apr | 2100 m (Very Soft) | Prix Noailles | G3 | Longchamp | 7 | 1st | 2:13.62 | 1 3/4 lengths | (Bright Picture) | Stéphane Pasquier | |
| 23 May | 2200 m (Heavy) | Prix Hocquart | G3 | Longchamp | 5 | 1st | 2:27.48 | 1 3/4 lengths | (Trafalgar Square) | Stéphane Pasquier | |
| 21 Jun | 1 1/2 miles (Good to Firm) | King Edward VII Stakes | G2 | Ascot | 14 | 1st | 2:29.11 | 6 lengths | (Space Legend) | Stéphane Pasquier | |
| 21 Aug | 1 mile 2 1/2 furlongs (Good to Firm) | International Stakes | G1 | York | 13 | 2nd | 2:04.32 | (1 length) | City of Troy | Stéphane Pasquier | |
| 19 Oct | 1 1/4 miles (Inner Soft) | Champion Stakes | G1 | Ascot | 5 | 2nd | 2:08.96 | (1/2 length) | Anmaat | Stéphane Pasquier | |
2025 – Four-year-old season
| 5 Apr | 2410 m (Good) | Dubai Sheema Classic | G1 | Meydan | 9 | 2nd | 2:27.05 | (1 1/4 lengths) | Danon Decile | Mickael Barzalona | |
| 6 Jun | 1 1/2 miles (Good to Soft) | Coronation Cup | G1 | Epsom Downs | 7 | 2nd | 2:36.13 | (1/2 length) | Jan Brueghel | Mickael Barzalona | |
| 29 Jun | 2400 m (Good to Soft) | Grand Prix de Saint-Cloud | G1 | Saint-Cloud | 5 | 1st | 2:28.28 | 3 1/2 lengths | (Aventure) | Mickael Barzalona | |
| 26 Jul | 1 1/2 miles (Good) | King George VI & Queen Elizabeth Stakes | G1 | Ascot | 5 | 1st | 2:29.74 | 1 length | (Kalpana) | Mickael Barzalona | |
| 18 Oct | 1 1/4 miles (Good) | Champion Stakes | G1 | Ascot | 11 | 1st | 2:03.19 | 2 1/4 lengths | (Ombudsman) | Mickael Barzalona | |
| 30 Nov | 2400 m (Firm) | Japan Cup | G1 | Tokyo | 17 | 1st | R2:20.3 | head | (Masquerade Ball) | Mickael Barzalona | |
2026 – Five-year-old season
| 28 Mar | 2410 m (Good) | Dubai Sheema Classic | G1 | Meydan | 6 | 1st | 2:27.88 | 3/4 length | (West Wind Blows) | Mickael Barzalona | |
| 6 Jun | 1 1/2 miles (Good to Soft) | Coronation Cup | G1 | Epsom Downs | 6 | 4th | 2:40.08 | (41 1/2 lengths) | Bay City Roller | Mickael Barzalona | |
| 5 Jul | 2400 m (Good to Firm) | Grand Prix de Saint-Cloud | G1 | Saint-Cloud | 8 | 1st | 2:27.27 | neck | (Cualificar) | Mickael Barzalona | |
| 25 Jul | 1 1/2 miles (Good to Firm) | King George VI & Queen Elizabeth Stakes | G1 | Ascot | 9 | 2nd | 2:27.72 | (1 1/2 lengths) | Kalpana | Mickael Barzalona | |
| 17 Oct | 1 1/4 miles (Good) | Champion Stakes | G1 | Ascot | 6 | 2nd | 2:04.22 | (3 3/4 lengths) | Ombudsman | Christophe Soumillon | |
| 29 Nov | 2400 m | Japan Cup | G1 | Tokyo | | | | | | Mickael Barzalona | |

- R in the chart and the time written in red indicates the horse finished in record time.

* Conversion of race distances
| Meters | Miles | Furlongs |
|---|---|---|
| 1,600 | 0.99 | 7.95 |
| 1,900 | 1.18 | 9.44 |
| 2,012 | 1.25 | 10 |
| 2,100 | 1.3 | 10.44 |
| 2,112 | 1.31 | 10.5 |
| 2,200 | 1.37 | 10.94 |
| 2,400 | 1.49 | 11.93 |
| 2,410 | 1.5 | 11.98 |
| 2,414 | 1.5 | 12 |

== Pedigree ==
Pedigree of Calandagan (IRE), bay gelding, foaled 27 January 2021
| Sire Gleneagles (IRE) (2012) | Galileo (IRE) (1988) | Sadler's Wells (USA) (1981) | Northern Dancer* (CAN) |
| Sire Gleneagles (IRE) (2012) | Galileo (IRE) (1988) | Sadler's Wells (USA) (1981) | Fairy Bridge (USA) |
| Sire Gleneagles (IRE) (2012) | Galileo (IRE) (1988) | Urban Sea (USA) (1989) | Miswaki (USA) |
| Sire Gleneagles (IRE) (2012) | Galileo (IRE) (1988) | Urban Sea (USA) (1989) | Allegretta (GB) |
| Sire Gleneagles (IRE) (2012) | You'resothrilling (USA) (2005) | Storm Cat (USA) (1983) | Storm Bird* (CAN) |
| Sire Gleneagles (IRE) (2012) | You'resothrilling (USA) (2005) | Storm Cat (USA) (1983) | Terlingua (USA) |
| Sire Gleneagles (IRE) (2012) | You'resothrilling (USA) (2005) | Mariah's Storm (USA) (1991) | Rahy (USA) |
| Sire Gleneagles (IRE) (2012) | You'resothrilling (USA) (2005) | Mariah's Storm (USA) (1991) | Immense (USA) |
| Dam Calayana (FR) (2012) | Sinndar (IRE) (1997) | Grand Lodge (USA) (1991) | Chief's Crown (USA) |
| Dam Calayana (FR) (2012) | Sinndar (IRE) (1997) | Grand Lodge (USA) (1991) | La Papagena (GB) |
| Dam Calayana (FR) (2012) | Sinndar (IRE) (1997) | Sinntara (IRE) (1989) | Lashkari (GB) |
| Dam Calayana (FR) (2012) | Sinndar (IRE) (1997) | Sinntara (IRE) (1989) | Sidama (FR) |
| Dam Calayana (FR) (2012) | Clariyn (FR) (2009) | Acclamation (GB) (1999) | Royal Applause (GB) |
| Dam Calayana (FR) (2012) | Clariyn (FR) (2009) | Acclamation (GB) (1999) | Princess Athena (IRE) |
| Dam Calayana (FR) (2012) | Clariyn (FR) (2009) | Clodovina (IRE) (2004) | Rock of Gibraltar (IRE) |
| Dam Calayana (FR) (2012) | Clariyn (FR) (2009) | Clodovina (IRE) (2004) | Clodora (FR) |

* Calandagan is inbred 4S x 5S to the stallion Northern Dancer, meaning that he appears twice in the fourth and fifth generation (via Storm Bird) on the sire side of his pedigree.

== See also ==
- List of leading Thoroughbred racehorses
