= Stand Cup =

Flat horse race in Britain

Stand Cup
2026
Plage De Havre	Grey Cuban	Dubai Honour

Previous years
2025
Hamish	Mount Atlas	Grey Cuban
2021
Invite	Alounak	Wells Farhh Go
2020
Alignak	Morando	Hereby
2019
Sextant	Manuela De Vega	Grace And Danger
2018
Blakeney Point	Hochfeld	Mistress Quickly
2017
Duretto	Across The Stars	Rich Legacy
2016
Mountain Bell	Desert Encounter	Foundation
2015
Secret Number	Lustrous	Sheikhzayedroad
2014
Energia Fribby	Livia's Dream	Pinzolo
2013
Tac De Boistron	Cubanita	Allied Powers
2012
Goldoni	Naseem Alyasmeen	Good Morning Star
2011
Debussy	Kiama Bay	Zennor
2010
Harris Tweed	Les Fazzani	Wajir
2009
Snoqualmie Girl	Traffic Guard	Indian Days
2008
Foxhaven	Carte Diamond	Strategic Mount
2007
Hattan	Foxhaven	Lundy's Lane
2006
Foxhaven	Soulacroix	Camrose

The Stand Cup is a Listed flat horse race in Great Britain open to horses aged three years or older. It is run at Chester over a distance of 1 mile 4 furlongs and 63 yards (2,472 metres), and it is scheduled to take place each year in September.

The race was first run in 2006.

== Winners ==
Year	Winner	Age	Jockey	Trainer	Time
2006	Foxhaven	4	Franny Norton	Patrick Chamings	2:40.15
2007	Hattan	5	Seb Sanders	Clive Brittain	2:37.11
2008	Foxhaven	6	Franny Norton	Patrick Chamings	2:43.77
2009	Snoqualmie Girl	3	Silvestre de Sousa	David Elsworth	2:34.93
2010	Harris Tweed	3	Liam Jones	William Haggas	2:48.75
2011	Debussy	5	Paul Hanagan	Mahmood Al Zarooni	2:37.39
2012	Goldoni	3	David Probert	Andrew Balding	2:42.42
2013	Tac De Boistron	6	Martin Harley	Marco Botti	2:49.83
2014	Energia Fribby	4	Ted Durcan	Marco Botti	2:41.41
2015	Secret Number	5	James Doyle	Saeed bin Suroor	2:46.90
2016	Mountain Bell	3	John Egan	Ralph Beckett	2:41.84
2017	Duretto	5	Graham Lee	Andrew Balding	2:53.40
2018	Blakeney Point	5	Trevor Whelan	Roger Charlton	2:44.14
2019	Sextant	4	Louis Steward	Sir Michael Stoute	2:38.00
2020	Alignak	4	David Allan	Sir Michael Stoute	2:39.24
2021	Invite	3	John Egan	Andrew Balding	2:38.85
2023	Al Qareem	4	Sam James	Karl Burke	2:41.93
2024	Al Qareem	5	Pierre-Louis Jamin	Karl Burke	2:43.21
2025	Hamish	9	Cieren Fallon	William Haggas	2:36.61
2026	Plage De Havre	5	Callum Hutchinson	Andrew Balding	2:39.05

== See also ==
- Horse racing in Great Britain
- List of British flat horse races
