= Golden Sword (horse) =

British-bred Thoroughbred racehorse

- Racing silks of Michael Tabor
- Sire: High Chaparral
- Grandsire: Sadler's Wells
- Dam: Sitara
- Damsire: Salse
- Sex: Stallion
- Foaled: 26 April 2006
- Country: Great Britain
- Colour: Bay
- Breeder: T. E. Pocock; Morton Bloodstock
- Owner: Michael Tabor; Derrick Smith; Mrs John Magnier; Sheikh Mohd bin Khalifa Al Maktoum
- Trainer: Aidan O'Brien; Mike de Kock; Jane Chapple-Hyam
- Record: 20: 4–2–2
- Earnings: £514,438

Major wins
- Chester Vase

Golden Sword (foaled 26 April 2006) is a British-bred Thoroughbred racehorse. He won the Chester Vase in 2009, before finishing fifth in The Derby and second in the Irish Derby. He was trained by Aidan O'Brien until the summer of 2010, when was transferred to Mike de Kock after being purchased by Sheikh Mohd bin Khalifa Al Maktoum.
