= Cartier Champion Three-year-old Colt =

Award in European horse racing

The Cartier Champion Three-year-old Colt is an award in European horse racing, founded in 1991, and sponsored by Cartier SA as part of the Cartier Racing Awards. The award winner is decided by points earned in group races plus the votes cast by British racing journalists and readers of the Racing Post and The Daily Telegraph newspapers.

== Records ==
Leading trainer (8 wins):

- Aidan O'Brien – Galileo (2001), Rock of Gibraltar (2002), George Washington (2006), Camelot (2012), Magician (2013), St Mark's Basilica (2021), City of Troy (2024), Delacroix (2025)

Leading owner (9 wins):

- Michael Tabor – Montjeu (1999), Galileo (2001), Hurricane Run (2005), George Washington (2006), Camelot (2012), Magician (2013), St Mark's Basilica (2021), City of Troy (2024), Delacroix (2025)

=== Winners ===
Year	Horse	Bred	Trained	Trainer	Owner
1991	Suave Dancer	USA	FR	John Hammond	Henri Chalhoub
1992	Rodrigo de Triano	USA	GB	Peter Chapple-Hyam	Robert Sangster
1993	Commander in Chief	GB	GB	Henry Cecil	Khalid Abdullah
1994	King's Theatre	IRE	GB	Henry Cecil	Sheikh Mohammed
1995	Lammtarra	USA	GB	Saeed bin Suroor	Saeed al Maktoum
1996	Helissio	FR	FR	Élie Lellouche	Enrique Sarasola
1997	Peintre Celebre	USA	FR	André Fabre	Daniel Wildenstein
1998	Dream Well	FR	FR	Pascal Bary	Niarchos family
1999	Montjeu	IRE	FR	John Hammond	Michael Tabor
2000	Sinndar	IRE	IRE	John Oxx	Aga Khan IV
2001	Galileo	IRE	IRE	Aidan O'Brien	Sue Magnier and Michael Tabor
2002	Rock of Gibraltar	IRE	IRE	Aidan O'Brien	Sue Magnier and Alex Ferguson
2003	Dalakhani	IRE	FR	Alain de Royer-Dupré	Aga Khan IV
2004	Bago	FR	FR	Jonathan Pease	Niarchos family
2005	Hurricane Run	IRE	FR	André Fabre	Michael Tabor
2006	George Washington	IRE	IRE	Aidan O'Brien	Magnier, Smith and Tabor
2007	Authorized	IRE	GB	Peter Chapple-Hyam	Saleh Al Homaizi and Imad Al Sagar
2008	New Approach	IRE	IRE	Jim Bolger	Princess Haya of Jordan
2009	Sea the Stars	IRE	IRE	John Oxx	Christopher Tsui
2010	Workforce	GB	GB	Michael Stoute	Khalid Abdullah
2011	Frankel	GB	GB	Henry Cecil	Khalid Abdullah
2012	Camelot	GB	IRE	Aidan O'Brien	Magnier, Smith and Tabor
2013	Magician	IRE	IRE	Aidan O'Brien	Magnier, Smith and Tabor
2014	Kingman	GB	GB	John Gosden	Khalid Abdullah
2015	Golden Horn	GB	GB	John Gosden	Anthony Oppenheimer
2016	Almanzor	FR	FR	Jean-Claude Rouget	Ecurie Antonio Caro
2017	Cracksman	GB	GB	John Gosden	Anthony Oppenheimer
2018	Roaring Lion	USA	GB	John Gosden	Qatar Racing
2019	Too Darn Hot	GB	GB	John Gosden	Andrew Lloyd Webber
2020	Palace Pier	GB	GB	John Gosden	Hamdan bin Mohammed Al Maktoum
2021	St Mark's Basilica	FR	IRE	Aidan O'Brien	Tabor, Smith and Magnier
2022	Vadeni	FR	FR	Jean-Claude Rouget	Aga Khan IV
2023	Ace Impact	IRE	FR	Jean-Claude Rouget	Ecuries Serge Stempniak
2024	City of Troy	USA	IRE	Aidan O'Brien	Magnier, Tabor & Smith
2025	Delacroix	IRE	IRE	Aidan O'Brien	Magnier, Tabor & Smith
2026	Bow Echo	IRE	GB	George Boughey	Executors of the Late Sheikh Mohammed Obaid al Makhtoum
