= Autumn Stakes (Great Britain) =

Flat horse race in Britain

- Class: Group 3
- Location: Rowley Mile; Newmarket, England
- Inaugurated: 1987
- Race type: Flat / Thoroughbred
- Sponsor: Emirates
- Website: Newmarket

Race information
- Distance: 1 mile (1,609 metres)
- Surface: Turf
- Track: Straight
- Qualification: Two-year-olds
- Weight: 9 st 3 lb Allowances; 3 lb for fillies Penalties; 5 lb for G1 / G2 winners 3 lb for G3 winners
- Purse: £65,000 (2025); 1st: £34,026

Autumn Stakes
2026
Rock Montreal	Sergei Diaghilev	Al Jabbar

Previous years
2025
Hankelow	Al Zanati	Glacius
2024
Delacroix	Stanhope Gardens	Nightwalker
2023
Ancient Wisdom	Chief Little Rock	Ambiente Friendly
2022
Silver Knott	Epictetus	Holloway Boy
2021
Coroebus	Imperial Fighter	Dubai Poet

2020-2011
2020
One Ruler	Van Gogh	Dhahabi
2019
Military March	Al Suhail	Ropey Guest
2018
Persian King	Magna Grecia	Circus Maximus
2017
Ghaiyyath	Dream Today	Purser
2016
Best Solution	Zainhom	The Anvil
2015
Gifted Master	Beacon Rock	Ibn Malik
2014
Commemorative	Restorer	Future Empire
2013
Kingston Hill	Oklahoma City	Truth Or Dare
2012
Trading Leather	Montiridge	Eye of The Storm
2011
Rockinante	Perennial	Astrology

2010-2001
2010
Abjer	Pausanias	Dux Scholar
2009
Morana	Prompter	Simenon
2008
Kite Wood	Taameer	Four Winds
2007
Ibn Khaldun	Redolent	Yahrab
2006
Caldra	Kid Mambo	Moudez
2005
Blitzkrieg	Dylan Thomas	Arabian Prince
2003
Fantastic View	Menokee	Temple Place
2002
Big Bad Bob	Rainwashed Gold	Choir Master
2001
Fight Your Corner	Coshocton	Assaaf

2000-1991
2000
Nayef	Hill Country	Count Dubois
1999
Epic Express	One Step At A Time	Total Love
1998
Daliapour	Boatman	Stormy Skye
1997
Dr Fong	Equity Princess	Rabah
1996
High Roller	Barnum Sands	Sheer Face
1995
Beauchamp King	Storm Trooper	Bright Heritage
1994
Presenting	Dahik	Brave Revival
1992
Taos	Declassified	Mukhamedov
1991
Ninja Dancer	King's Loch	Rokeby

1990-1988
1990
Sea Level	Circus Light	Green's Ferneley
1989
Noble Patriarch	Harbour Bar	Green's Leader
1988
Nashwan	Optimist	Cacoethes

The Autumn Stakes is a Group 3 flat horse race in Great Britain open to two-year-old horses. It is run on the Rowley Mile at Newmarket over a distance of 1 mile (1,609 metres), and it is scheduled to take place each year in October.

== History ==
The event was established in 1987, and it was originally held at Ascot. The inaugural running was abandoned because of a waterlogged course. For a period the race held Listed status, and it was promoted to Group 3 level in 2003.

The Autumn Stakes was transferred to Newmarket in 2011. It became part of a new fixture called Future Champions Day but from 2014 it moved to be run at the same fixture as the Cesarewitch Handicap. Since 2015 it has formed part of the revamped Future Champions Festival at Newmarket.

The leading horses from the race sometimes go on to compete in the Futurity Trophy. The last to win both was Kingston Hill in 2013.

== Records ==
Leading jockey (7 wins):

- William Buick - Gifted Master (2015), Ghaiyyath (2017), One Ruler (2020), Coroebus (2021), Silver Knott (2022), Ancient Wisdom (2023), Rock Montreal (2026)

Leading trainer (5 wins):

- Charlie Appleby - Ghaiyyath (2017), One Ruler (2020), Coroebus (2021), Silver Knott (2022), Ancient Wisdom (2023)

== Winners ==
Year	Winner	Jockey	Trainer	Time
1987	Abandoned due to waterlogging
1988	Nashwan	Willie Carson	Dick Hern	1:47.29
1989	Noble Patriarch	Willie Carson	John Dunlop	1:43.91
1990	Sea Level	Steve Cauthen	Barry Hills	1:42.08
1991	Ninja Dancer	Bruce Raymond	Julie Cecil	1:45.28
1992	Taos	Steve Cauthen	John Gosden	1:43.34
1993	Abandoned due to waterlogging
1994	Presenting	Frankie Dettori	John Gosden	1:41.86
1995	Beauchamp King	John Reid	John Dunlop	1:48.16
1996	High Roller	Pat Eddery	Henry Cecil	1:44.91
1997	Dr Fong	Kieren Fallon	Henry Cecil	1:49.31
1998	Daliapour	Olivier Peslier	Luca Cumani	1:48.32
1999	French Fellow (Note: The 1999 winner French Fellow was later exported to Hong Kong and renamed Epic Express)	Pat Eddery	Tim Easterby	1:46.86
2000	Nayef	Richard Hills	Marcus Tregoning	1:49.79
2001	Fight Your Corner	Kevin Darley	Mark Johnston	1:44.59
2002	Big Bad Bob	Pat Eddery	John Dunlop	1:42.52
2003	Fantastic View	Pat Dobbs	Richard Hannon Sr.	1:45.55
2004	no race (Note: The 2004 race was scheduled to be run at Salisbury, but it was cancelled due to heavy rain)
2005 (Note: The 2005 edition took place at Salisbury. Dylan Thomas finished second.)	Blitzkrieg	Seb Sanders	Vince Smith	1:40.90
2006	Caldra	Declan McDonogh	Sylvester Kirk	1:43.56
2007	Ibn Khaldun	Frankie Dettori	Saeed bin Suroor	1:44.24
2008	Kite Wood	Philip Robinson	Michael Jarvis	1:42.42
2009	Morana	Alan Munro	Peter Chapple-Hyam	1:43.51
2010	Abjer	Richard Hills	Clive Brittain	1:44.84
2011	Rockinante	Richard Hughes	Richard Hannon Sr.	1:37.71
2012	Trading Leather	Kevin Manning	Jim Bolger	1:37.83
2013	Kingston Hill	Andrea Atzeni	Roger Varian	1:39.07
2014	Commemorative	James Doyle	Charles Hills	1:37.91
2015	Gifted Master	William Buick	Hugo Palmer	1:39.24
2016	Best Solution	William Carson	Saeed bin Suroor	1:37.15
2017	Ghaiyyath	William Buick	Charlie Appleby	1:35.92
2018	Persian King	Pierre-Charles Boudot	André Fabre	1:37.35
2019	Military March	Oisin Murphy	Saeed bin Suroor	1:40.47
2020	One Ruler	William Buick	Charlie Appleby	1:39.71
2021	Coroebus	William Buick	Charlie Appleby	1:38.65
2022	Silver Knott	William Buick	Charlie Appleby	1:36.00
2023	Ancient Wisdom	William Buick	Charlie Appleby	1:37.92
2024	Delacroix	Ryan Moore	Aidan O'Brien	1:40.49
2025	Hankelow	Clifford Lee	Karl Burke	1:38.12
2026	Rock Montreal	William Buick	Roger Varian	1:36.31

== See also ==
- Horse racing in Great Britain
- List of British flat horse races
