= Lambourn (horse) =

Irish Thoroughbred racehorse

- Sire: Australia
- Grandsire: Galileo
- Dam: Gossamer Wings
- Damsire: Scat Daddy
- Sex: Colt
- Foaled: 24 April 2022
- Country: Ireland
- Colour: Bay
- Breeder: Coolmore Stud
- Owner: Derrick Smith, Susan Magnier and Michael Tabor
- Trainer: Aidan O'Brien
- Record: 12: 6-1-0
- Earnings: £1,876,210

Major wins
- Criterium de l'Ouest (2024); Chester Vase (2025); Epsom Derby (2025); Irish Derby (2025); Huxley Stakes (2026)

Lambourn (foaled 24 April 2022) is an Irish Thoroughbred racehorse. He showed promise as a two-year-old in 2024, winning two of his three starts including the Listed Criterium de l'Ouest. In the following year he showed improved form, finishing second in the Ballysax Stakes before winning the Chester Vase, the Epsom Derby and the Irish Derby.

== Background ==
Lambourn is a bay colt with a white stripe bred in Ireland by the Coolmore Stud. He races in the ownership of the Coolmore partners Derrick Smith, Susan Magnier and Michael Tabor and was sent into training with Aidan O'Brien at Ballydoyle.

He is from the seventh crop of foals sired by Australia who won the Epsom Derby, Irish Derby and International Stakes in 2014. Lambourn's dam Gossamer Wings won one minor race from fourteen starts and was placed in both the Queen Mary Stakes and the Flying Childers Stakes.

== Racing career ==
=== 2024: two-year-old season ===
Lambourn began his racing career in a one mile race on good ground at Killarney Racecourse on 17 July when he was ridden by Wayne Lordan and started at odds of 6/1 in a ten-runner field. After racing "lazily" in the early stages he looked unlikely to win until the clear leader Green Triangle veered off the course inside the final furlong. Lambourn stayed on well in the closing stages and won by three quarters of a length from J'Adore Chris.

For his next race the colt was stepped up in class and sent to France to contest the Listed Criterium de l'Ouest over 1600 metres on very soft ground at Craon on 31 August. Ridden by Christophe Soumillon he started the odds-on favourite against six opponents and recovered from a poor start to win by three quarters of a length from Place Fontenoy after taking the lead 300 metres from the finish.

On his final start as a two-year-old Lambourn was moved up in class again for the Group 2 Beresford Stakes at the Curragh on 28 September when he was equipped with blinkers. He made little impact and looked "outpaced" in the closing stages as he finished last of the five runners, almost eight lengths behind the winner Hotazhell.

=== 2025: three-year-old season ===
Lambourn began his second campaign in the Group 3 Ballysax Stakes over ten furlongs at Leopardstown Racecourse on 30 March when he was ridden by Ronan Whelan and started the 9/1 third choice in the betting. After racing in third place he made steady progress in the straight but proved "no match" for his stablemate Delacroix and finished second, beaten two and a quarter lengths by the winner. Ryan Moore took the ride when Lambourn was sent to England to contest the Chester Vase (a trial race for the Epsom Derby) over one and a half miles at Chester Racecourse on 7 May. Starting the 11/8 favourite in an eight-runner field, he raced close behind the leaders before overtaking Lazy Griff inside the final furlong and won "going away" by one and a half lengths. After the race Aidan O'Brien said "He looked a thorough stayer and while he was a little on and off the bridle, once the penny dropped, he came home really strongly... He got the trip really well and he's gone through the line nicely.

A month after his win at Chester, Lambourn returned to England to contest the 246th running of the Derby over one and half miles on good ground at Epsom Racecourse when he was ridden by Lordan. He went off the 13/2 third choice in the betting behind Delacroix and the Dante Stakes winner Pride of Arras in an eighteen-runner field which also included The Lion In Winter (Acomb Stakes), Midak (Prix Greffulhe) and Tennessee Stud (Criterium de Saint-Cloud). Lambourn took the lead from the start and was never seriously challenged, coming home three and three quarter lengths clear of Lazy Griff, with Tennessee Stud taking third place ahead of the French-trained outsider New Ground. After the race Lordan said "He's a horse we always felt would stay. I just thought that anybody who would get to me would have to stay well and it would be tough for them... for any jockey that starts out all they ever want to do is win a Derby". O'Brien commented "Lambourn is very straightforward... he's a very genuine horse. I'm delighted for Wayne, I couldn't be happier." A close-fought victory followed in the Irish Derby. The second half of the season, however, proved a disappointment, with Lambourn finishing fifth in the Great Voltigeur Stakes at York and fourth in the St Leger in September.

== Pedigree ==
Pedigree of Lambourn (IRE), bay colt, 2022
Sire Australia (IRE) 2011	Galileo (IRE); 1998	Sadler's Wells (USA)	Northern Dancer (CAN)
Sire Australia (IRE) 2011	Galileo (IRE); 1998	Sadler's Wells (USA)	Fairy Bridge
Sire Australia (IRE) 2011	Galileo (IRE); 1998	Urban Sea (USA)	Miswaki
Sire Australia (IRE) 2011	Galileo (IRE); 1998	Urban Sea (USA)	Allegretta (GB)
Sire Australia (IRE) 2011	Ouija Board (GB); 2001	Cape Cross (IRE)	Green Desert (USA)
Sire Australia (IRE) 2011	Ouija Board (GB); 2001	Cape Cross (IRE)	Park Appeal
Sire Australia (IRE) 2011	Ouija Board (GB); 2001	Selection Board	Welsh Pageant (FR)
Sire Australia (IRE) 2011	Ouija Board (GB); 2001	Selection Board	Ouija
Dam Gossamer Wings (USA) 2016	Scat Daddy (USA); 2004	Johannesburg	Hennessy
Dam Gossamer Wings (USA) 2016	Scat Daddy (USA); 2004	Johannesburg	Myth
Dam Gossamer Wings (USA) 2016	Scat Daddy (USA); 2004	Love Style	Mr Prospector
Dam Gossamer Wings (USA) 2016	Scat Daddy (USA); 2004	Love Style	Likeable Style
Dam Gossamer Wings (USA) 2016	Lavender Baby (USA); 1999	Rubiano	Fappiano
Dam Gossamer Wings (USA) 2016	Lavender Baby (USA); 1999	Rubiano	Ruby Slippers
Dam Gossamer Wings (USA) 2016	Lavender Baby (USA); 1999	Mighty Milk	Hero's Honor
Dam Gossamer Wings (USA) 2016	Lavender Baby (USA); 1999	Mighty Milk	Hot Milk (Family: 4-i)
