= Huxley Stakes =

Flat horse race in Britain

- Class: Group 2
- Location: Chester Racecourse; Chester, England
- Inaugurated: 1999
- Race type: Flat / Thoroughbred
- Sponsor: Irish Thoroughbred Marketing
- Website: Chester

Race information
- Distance: 1m 2f 70y (2,076m)
- Surface: Turf
- Track: Left-handed
- Qualification: Four-years-old and up
- Weight: 9 st 3 lb Allowances; 3 lb for fillies and mares Penalties; 5 lb for Group 1 winners * 3 lb for Group 2 winners * * since 31 August last year
- Purse: £130,000 (2025); 1st: £73,323

Huxley Stakes
2026
| Lambourn | Bay City Roller | Ice Max |

Previous years
2025
The Foxes | Cairo | Liberty Lane
2024
Passenger | Israr | Regal Reality
2023
Point Lonsdale | Mujtaba | Layfayette
2022
Solid Stone | Certain Lad | Megallan
2021
Armory | Sangarius | Palavecino

2020-2011
2019
Forest Ranger | Matterhorn | Success Days
2018
Forest Ranger | War Decree | Gabrial
2017
Deauville | Poet's Word | Folkswood
2016
Cannock Chase | Western Hymn | Master Carpenter
2015
Maverick Wave | Cannock Chase | Air Pilot
2014
Noble Mission | Telescope | Danadana
2013
Danadana | Highland Knight | Gabrial
2012
Marcret | Myplacelater | Wigmore Hall
2011
Await The Dawn | Distant Memories | Forte Dei Marmi

2010-2001
2010
Debussy | Les Fazzani | South Easter
2009
Doctor Fremantle | Staying On | Expresso Star
2008
Championship Point | Maraahel | Spice Route
2007
Maraahel | Blue Bajan | Ivy Creek
2006
Maraahel | Counsel's Opinion | Kew Green
2005
Maraahel | Solskjaer | Counsel's Opinion
2004
Bandari | Parasol | Leporello
2003
Parasol | Vintage Premium | Burning Sun
2002
Freefourinternet | Island House | Tough Speed
2001
Adilabad | Island House | Gold Academy

2000-1999
2000
| Sossus Vlei | Rain In Spain | Monsajem |
1999
| Chester House | Supreme Sound | Generous Libra |

The Huxley Stakes is a Group 2 flat horse race in Great Britain open to horses aged four years or older. It is run over a distance of 1 mile, 2 furlongs and 70 yards (2,076 metres) at Chester in May.

== History ==
The event is named after Huxley, a village located to the east of Chester. It was established in 1999, and the first running was won by Chester House. It initially held Listed status, and was promoted to Group 3 level in 2005. It was upgraded again to Group 2 level in 2018.

The trophy for the Huxley Stakes is known as the Tradesman's Cup. Another race at the venue, the Chester Cup, was originally called the Tradesmen's Cup.

== Records ==
Most successful horse (3 wins):

- Maraahel – 2005, 2006, 2007

Leading jockey (9 wins):

- Ryan Moore - Doctor Fremantle (2009), Await The Dawn (2011), Marcret (2012), Cannock Chase (2016), Deauville (2017), Armory (2021), Solid Stone (2022), Point Lonsdale (2023), Lambourn (2026)

Leading trainer (8 wins):

- Sir Michael Stoute – Adilabad (2001), Maraahel (2005, 2006, 2007), Doctor Fremantle (2009), Cannock Chase (2016), Solid Stone (2022), Passenger (2024)

Leading owner (5 wins):

- Sue Magnier - Await the Dawn (2011), Deauville (2017), Armory (2021), Point Lonsdale (2023), Lambourn (2026)
- Michael Tabor - Await the Dawn (2011), Deauville (2017), Armory (2021), Point Lonsdale (2023), Lambourn (2026)

== Winners ==
| Year | Winner | Age | Jockey | Trainer | Owner | Time |
|---|---|---|---|---|---|---|
| 1999 | Chester House | 4 | Kieren Fallon | Henry Cecil | Khalid Abdullah | 2:11.79 |
| 2000 | Sossus Vlei | 4 | Michael Roberts | Geoff Wragg | Anthony Oppenheimer | 2:11.95 |
| 2001 | Adilabad | 4 | Kieren Fallon | Sir Michael Stoute | Aga Khan IV | 2:10.32 |
| 2002 | Freefourinternet | 4 | Pat Eddery | Brian Meehan | Roldvale Ltd | 2:09.69 |
| 2003 | Parasol | 4 | Frankie Dettori | David Loder | Mohammed Al Nabouda | 2:10.66 |
| 2004 | Bandari | 5 | Richard Hills | Mark Johnston | Hamdan Al Maktoum | 2:14.40 |
| 2005 | Maraahel | 4 | Richard Hills | Sir Michael Stoute | Hamdan Al Maktoum | 2:13.29 |
| 2006 | Maraahel | 5 | Richard Hills | Sir Michael Stoute | Hamdan Al Maktoum | 2:07.92 |
| 2007 | Maraahel | 6 | Richard Hills | Sir Michael Stoute | Hamdan Al Maktoum | 2:08.88 |
| 2008 | Championship Point | 5 | Darryll Holland | Mick Channon | John Livock | 2:11.21 |
| 2009 | Doctor Fremantle | 4 | Ryan Moore | Sir Michael Stoute | Khalid Abdullah | 2:10.04 |
| 2010 | Debussy | 4 | William Buick | John Gosden | Princess Haya of Jordan | 2:12.38 |
| 2011 | Await the Dawn | 4 | Ryan Moore | Aidan O'Brien | Susan Magnier & Michael Tabor | 2:08.54 |
| 2012 | Marcret | 5 | Ryan Moore | Marco Botti | Marwan Koukash | 2:19.30 |
| 2013 | Danadana | 5 | Kieren Fallon | Luca Cumani | Sheikh Mohammed Obaid al Maktoum | 2:11.61 |
| 2014 | Noble Mission | 5 | James Doyle | Lady Cecil | Khalid Abdullah | 2:13.11 |
| 2015 | Maverick Wave | 4 | William Buick | John Gosden | Godolphin | 2:15.33 |
| 2016 | Cannock Chase | 5 | Ryan Moore | Sir Michael Stoute | Saeed Suhail | 2:11.65 |
| 2017 | Deauville | 4 | Ryan Moore | Aidan O'Brien | Hay / Tabor / Magnier / Smith | 2:10.22 |
| 2018 | Forest Ranger | 4 | Tony Hamilton | Richard Fahey | Mrs H Steel | 2:08.39 |
| 2019 | Forest Ranger | 5 | Tony Hamilton | Richard Fahey | Mrs H Steel | 2:16.26 |
| | no race 2020 (Note: The 2020 running was cancelled because of the COVID-19 pandemic in the United Kingdom) |
| 2021 | Armory | 4 | Ryan Moore | Aidan O'Brien | Magnier / Tabor / Smith | 2:11.64 |
| 2022 | Solid Stone | 6 | Ryan Moore | Sir Michael Stoute | Saeed Suhail | 2:07.79 |
| 2023 | Point Lonsdale | 4 | Ryan Moore | Aidan O'Brien | Magnier / Tabor / Westerberg / Smith | 2:13.98 |
| 2024 | Passenger | 4 | Richard Kingscote | Sir Michael Stoute | Flaxman Stables Ireland Ltd | 2:05.24 |
| 2025 | The Foxes | 5 | Oisin Murphy | Andrew Balding | King Power Racing Co Ltd | 2:09.21 |
| 2026 | Lambourn | 4 | Ryan Moore | Aidan O'Brien | Magnier /Tabor / Smith | 2:08:77 |

== See also ==
- Horse racing in Great Britain
- List of British flat horse races
