= Chester Vase =

Flat horse race in Britain

- Class: Group 3
- Location: Chester Racecourse; Chester, Cheshire, England
- Inaugurated: 1907
- Race type: Flat / Thoroughbred
- Sponsor: Boodles
- Website: Chester

Race information
- Distance: 1m 4f 63y (2,472m)
- Surface: Turf
- Track: Left-handed
- Qualification: Three-year-old colts and geldings
- Weight: 9 st 2 lb Penalties; 4 lb for G1 / G2 winners * * after 31 August 2024
- Purse: £140,000 (2025); 1st: £79,394

Chester Vase
2026
Benvenuto Cellini	Proposition	Mr Colonel

Previous years
2025
Lambourn	Lazy Griff	Convergent
2024
Hidden Law	Agenda	Grosvenor Square
2023
Arrest	Adelaide River	Hadrianus
2022
Changingoftheguard	New London	Savvy Victory
2021
Youth Spirit	Sandhurst	Fancy Man

2020-2011
2019
Sir Dragonet	Norway	Dashing Willoughby
2018
Young Rascal	Dee Ex Bee	Hunting Horn
2017
Venice Beach	Wings Of Eagles	The Anvil
2016
Us Army Ranger	Port Douglas	Ormito
2015
Hans Holbein	Storm The Stars	Medrano
2014
Orchestra	Romsdal	Scotland
2013
Ruler Of The World	Mister Impatience	Havana Beat
2012
Mickdaam	Model Pupil	Call To Battle
2011
Treasure Beach	Nathaniel	Slumber

2010-2001
2010
Ted Spread	Icon Dream	Chink Of Light
2009
Golden Sword	Masterofthehorse	Debussy
2008
Doctor Fremantle	All The Aces	Pampas Cat
2007
Soldier of Fortune	Arabian Gulf	Celestial Halo
2006
Papal Bull	Dragon Dancer	Mashaahed
2005
Hattan	Almighty	First Row
2004
Red Lancer	Privy Seal	Temple Place
2003
Dutch Gold	Summerland	Risk Taker
2002
Fight your Corner	Sparkling Water	Kaysari
2001
Mr Combustible	Snowstorm	Golden Wells

2000-1991
2000
Millenary	Windsor Boy	Tantalus
1999
Peshtigo	Lightning Arrow	Iscan
1998
Gulland	The Glow-Worm	Distant Mirage
1997
Panama City	Ivan Luis	State Fair
1996
High Baroque	St Mawes	Prince Of My Heart
1995
Luso	Court Of Honour	Maralinga
1994
Broadway Flyer	Moonax	Sadler's Image
1993
Armiger	Shrewd Idea	Persian Brave
1992
Twist And Turn	Jape	Mack The Knife
1991
Toulon	Luchiroverte	Peking Opera

1990-1988
1990
Belmez	Quest For Fame	Missionary Ridge
1989
Old Vic	Golden Pheasant	Warrshan
1988
Unfuwain	Kalakate	Vayrua

The Chester Vase is a Group 3 flat horse race in Great Britain open to three-year-old colts and geldings. It is run over a distance of 1 mile, 4 furlongs and 63 yards (2,472 metres) at Chester in May.

== History ==
The event was established in 1907, and it was originally open to horses aged three or four. The result of the first running was a dead-heat.

For a period the race was contested over 1 mile, 5 furlongs and 75 yards. It was restricted to three-year-olds and cut to 1 mile, 4 furlongs and 53 yards in 1959. It was not held in 1969, and extended by several yards in 1970.

The Chester Vase serves as a trial for the Epsom Derby. The last horse to win both races was Lambourn in 2025.

== Records ==
Leading jockey (10 wins):

- Ryan Moore - Doctor Fremantle (2008), Treasure Beach (2011), Ruler Of The World (2013), Orchestra (2014), Hans Holbein (2015), US Army Ranger (2016), Venice Beach (2017), Changingoftheguard (2022), Lambourn (2025), Benvenuto Cellini (2026)

Leading trainer (12 wins):

- Aidan O'Brien - Soldier Of Fortune (2007), Golden Sword (2009), Treasure Beach (2011), Ruler Of The World (2013), Orchestra (2014), Hans Holbein (2015), US Army Ranger (2016), Venice Beach (2017), Sir Dragonet (2019), Changingoftheguard (2022), Lambourn (2025), Benvenuto Cellini (2026)

== Winners ==
Year	Winner	Jockey	Trainer	Time
1907 (dh)	Earlston; Sancy	Charles Heckford; Otto Madden	Sam Loates; Alec Taylor Jr.
1908	Galvani	Bernard Dillon	Peter Gilpin
1909	St Ninian	Harry Watts	Martin Gurry
1910	Bayardo	Danny Maher	Alec Taylor Jr.
1911	Maaz	Edwin Piper	Ralph Moreton
1912	Lycaon	Frank Wootton	Charles Morton	2:42.40
1913	Cylba	Danny Maher	Samuel Pickering	2:54.60
1914	Dan Russell	Frank Bullock	George Lambton	2:40.60
1915	Esplandian	Charles Dickens	Joseph Butters
1916-18	No Race
1919	Air Raid	Joe Childs	Alec Taylor Jr.	2:53.00
1920	Buchan	Frank Bullock	Alec Taylor Jr.	2:50.80
1921	Meeting Abandoned due to a National Coal Strike
1922	Fodder	Joe Shatwell	Etienne De Mestre	2:44.40
1923	Papyrus	Steve Donoghue	Basil Jarvis	2:42.00
1924	Inkerman	Frank Bullock	Alec Taylor Jr.	2:52.40
1925	Vermilion Pencil	Tommy Weston	Richard Dawson	2:46.40
1926	Swift and Sure	Bobby Jones	Alec Taylor Jr.	2:38.40
1927	Lone Knight	Archie Burns	F Scott	2:40.00
1928	Hectare	Harry Graves	George Digby	2:42.00
1929	En Garde	Gordon Richards	John Watts Jr.	2:43.40
1930	Pinxit	Archie Burns	Norman Scobie	2:45.80
1931	Sandwich	Billy Nevett	Jack Jarvis	2:44.80
1932	Bulandshah	Freddie Fox	Frank Butters	2:54.60
1933	Hyperion	Tommy Weston	George Lambton	2:41.80
1934	Windsor Lad	Freddie Fox	Marcus Marsh	2:42.00
1935	Valerius	Tommy Weston	Joseph Lawson	2:38.20
1936	Taj Akbar	Gordon Richards	Frank Butters	2:40.80
1937	Merry Mathew	Billy Nevett	Matthew Peacock	2:45.00
1938	Cave Man	Cliff Richards	Joseph Lawson	2:40.00
1939	Heliopolis	Tommy Weston	Walter Earl	2:42.00
1940–45	No Race
1946	Sky High	Tommy Weston	Walter Earl	2:38.80
1947	Edward Tudor	Gordon Richards	Fred Darling	2:45.80
1948	Valognes	Edgar Britt	Marcus Marsh	2:35.20
1949	Swallow Tail	Doug Smith	Walter Earl	2:52.60
1950	Castle Rock	Doug Smith	Jack Jarvis	2:55.20
1951	Supreme Court	Rae Johnstone	Evan Williams	2:56.60
1952	Summer Rain	Manny Mercer	Jack Jarvis	3:01.00
1953	Empire Honey	Manny Mercer	Jack Jarvis	2:51.80
1954	Blue Rod	Derrick Greening	Harvey Leader	2:54.40
1955	Daemon	Jock Wilson	Paddy Prendergast	3:04.60
1956	Articulate	Denis Ryan	Willie Stephenson	2:55.60
1957	King Babar	Peter Robinson	Paddy Prendergast	2:54.00
1958	Alcide	Willie Snaith	Cecil Boyd-Rochfort	2:58.00
1959	Fidalgo	Stan Clayton	Harry Wragg	2:42.20
1960	Mr Higgins	Harry Carr	Humphrey Cottrill	2:37.40
1961	Sovrango	Joe Mercer	Harry Wragg	2:51.60
1962	Silver Cloud	Ron Hutchinson	Jack Jarvis	2:41.00
1963	Christmas Island	Lester Piggott	Paddy Prendergast	2:40.00
1964	Indiana	Joe Mercer	Jack Watts	2:37.20
1965	Gulf Pearl	Jimmy Lindley	Jeremy Tree	2:51.60
1966	General Gordon	Paul Cook	Jack Jarvis	2:47.60
1967	Great Host	Des Lake	Paddy Prendergast	2:42.60
1968	Remand	Joe Mercer	Dick Hern	2:49.20
1969	Abandoned due to waterlogging
1970	Politico	Sandy Barclay	Noel Murless	2:40.40
1971	Linden Tree	Duncan Keith	Peter Walwyn	2:38.30
1972	Ormindo	Brian Taylor	Harry Wragg	2:40.60
1973	Proverb	Ernie Johnson	Barry Hills	2:41.78
1974	Jupiter Pluvius	John Gorton	Bruce Hobbs	2:41.33
1975	Shantallah	Brian Taylor	Harry Wragg	2:41.51
1976	Old Bill	Brian Taylor	Harry Wragg	2:44.36
1977	Hot Grove	Lester Piggott	Fulke Johnson Houghton	2:45.60
1978	Icelandic	Christy Roche	Paddy Prendergast	2:42.93
1979	Cracaval	Steve Cauthen	Barry Hills	2:49.70
1980	Henbit	Willie Carson	Dick Hern	2:36.56
1981	Shergar	Walter Swinburn	Michael Stoute	2:40.47
1982	Super Sunrise	Paul Cook	Gavin Hunter	2:41.12
1983	Abandoned due to waterlogging
1984	Kaytu	Willie Carson	Dick Hern	Not taken
1985	Law Society	Pat Eddery	Vincent O'Brien	2:44:72
1986	Nomrood	Richard Quinn	Paul Cole	2:46.08
1987	Dry Dock	Willie Carson	Dick Hern	2:37.97
1988	Unfuwain	Willie Carson	Dick Hern	2:52.48
1989	Old Vic	Steve Cauthen	Henry Cecil	2:34.21
1990	Belmez	Steve Cauthen	Henry Cecil	2:41.42
1991	Toulon	Pat Eddery	André Fabre	2:45.69
1992	Twist and Turn	Steve Cauthen	Henry Cecil	2:37.13
1993	Armiger	Pat Eddery	Henry Cecil	2:35.32
1994	Broadway Flyer	Michael Hills	John Hills	2:36.03
1995	Luso	Michael Kinane	Clive Brittain	2:38.38
1996	High Baroque	John Reid	Peter Chapple-Hyam	2:40.16
1997	Panama City	John Reid	Peter Chapple-Hyam	2:46.64
1998	Gulland	Michael Hills	Geoff Wragg	2:38.18
1999	Peshtigo (Note: Housemaster finished first in 1999, but he was relegated to fourth place following a stewards' inquiry)	Michael Hills	Barry Hills	2:36.63
2000	Millenary	Pat Eddery	John Dunlop	2:38.11
2001	Mr Combustible	Michael Hills	Barry Hills	2:34.30
2002	Fight Your Corner	Kevin Darley	Mark Johnston	2:33.70
2003	Dutch Gold	Frankie Dettori	Clive Brittain	2:35.85
2004	Red Lancer	Robert Miles	Richard Price	2:44.33
2005	Hattan	Seb Sanders	Clive Brittain	2:44.91
2006	Papal Bull	Kieren Fallon	Sir Michael Stoute	2:35.24
2007	Soldier of Fortune	Michael Kinane	Aidan O'Brien	2:35.24
2008	Doctor Fremantle	Ryan Moore	Sir Michael Stoute	2:37.39
2009	Golden Sword	Colm O'Donoghue	Aidan O'Brien	2:33.86
2010	Ted Spread	Darryll Holland	Mark Tompkins	2:43.32
2011	Treasure Beach	Ryan Moore	Aidan O'Brien	2:39.10
2012	Mickdaam	Tony Hamilton	Richard Fahey	2:50.01
2013	Ruler of the World	Ryan Moore	Aidan O'Brien	2:40.29
2014	Orchestra	Ryan Moore	Aidan O'Brien	2:42.05
2015	Hans Holbein	Ryan Moore	Aidan O'Brien	2:45.53
2016	US Army Ranger	Ryan Moore	Aidan O'Brien	2:41.07
2017	Venice Beach	Ryan Moore	Aidan O'Brien	2:35.84
2018	Young Rascal	James Doyle	William Haggas	2:39.55
2019	Sir Dragonet	Donnacha O'Brien	Aidan O'Brien	2:42.91
	no race 2020 (Note: The 2020 running was cancelled because of the COVID-19 pandemic in the United Kingdom)
2021	Youth Spirit	Tom Marquand	Andrew Balding	2:45.83
2022	Changingoftheguard	Ryan Moore	Aidan O'Brien	2:43.36
2023	Arrest	Frankie Dettori	John & Thady Gosden	2:52.31
2024	Hidden Law (Note: Hidden Law was fatally injured after the finish of the race)	William Buick	Charlie Appleby	2:38.89
2025	Lambourn	Ryan Moore	Aidan O'Brien	2:40.12
2026	Benvenuto Cellini	Ryan Moore	Aidan O'Brien	2:35:22

== See also ==
- Horse racing in Great Britain
- List of British flat horse races
