= Chester Racecourse =

Horse racing venue in England

Coordinates: 53°11′11″N 2°53′59″W

Chester
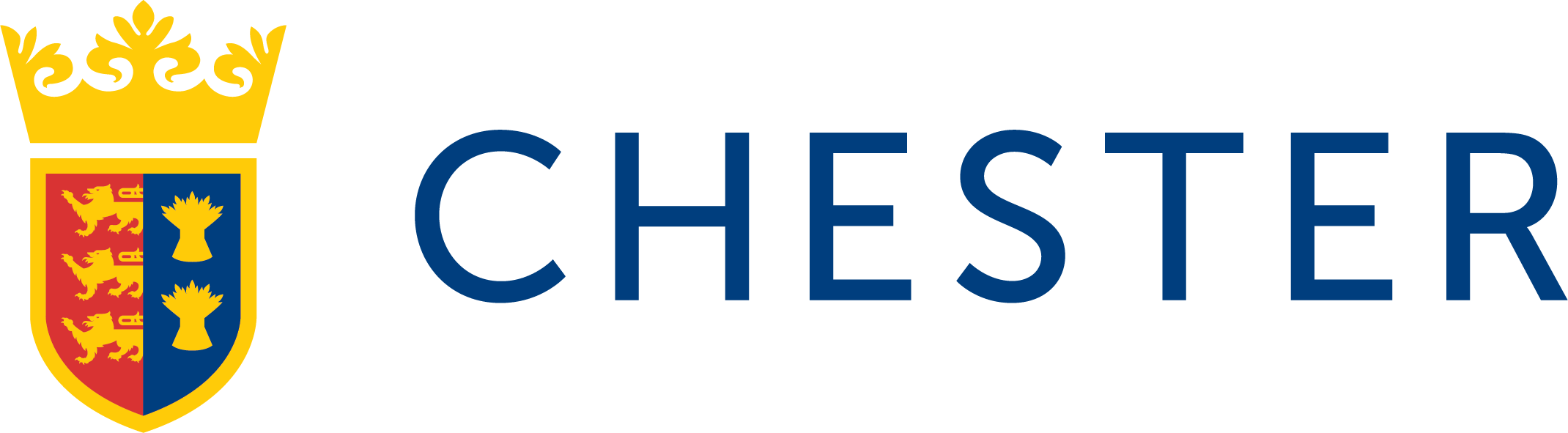

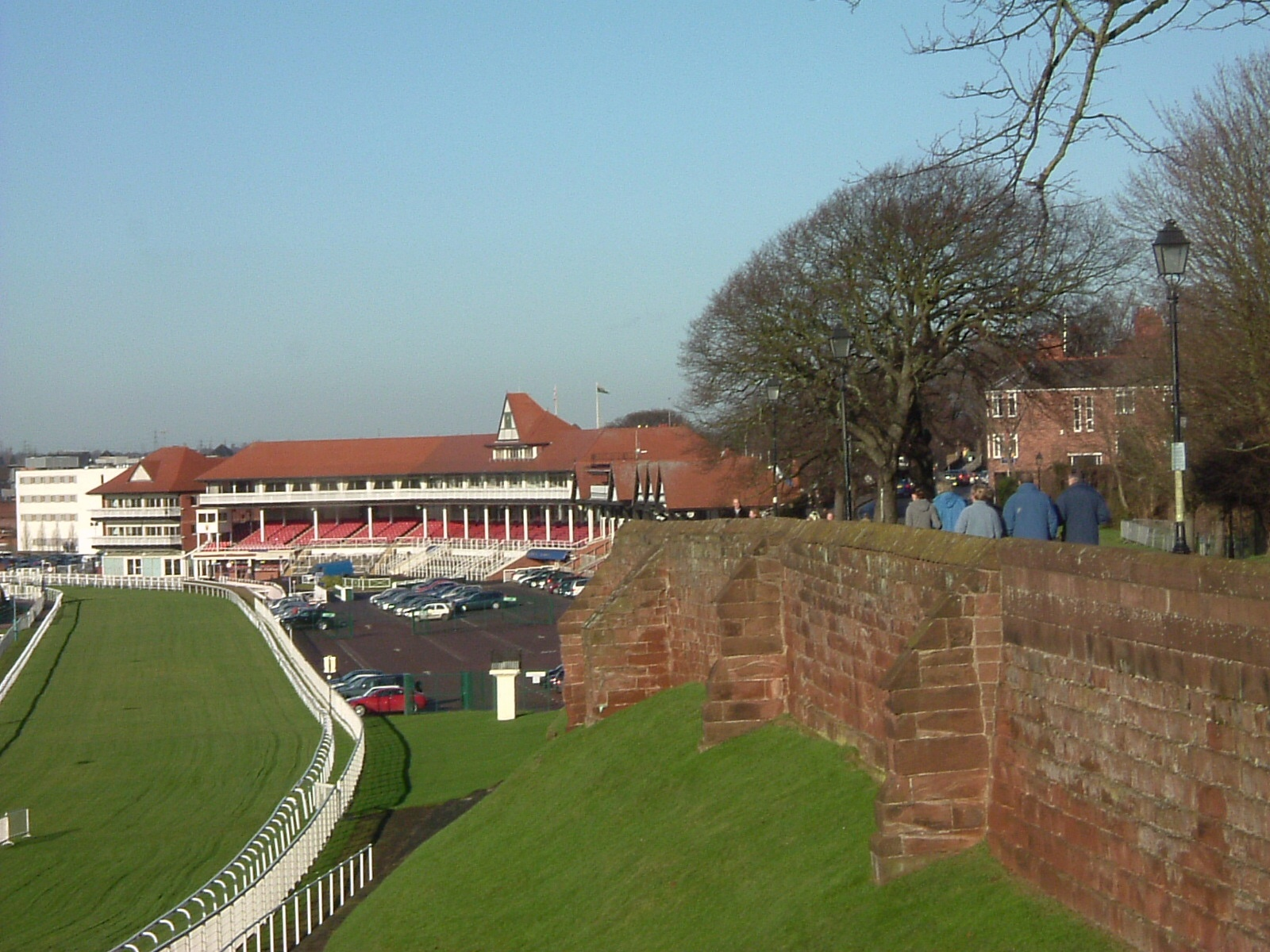
- The racecourse stands, with the city walls visible on the right
- Interactive map of Chester
- Location: Chester, Cheshire
- Owned by: Chester Race Company Ltd.
- Screened on: Sky Sports Racing
- Course type: Flat

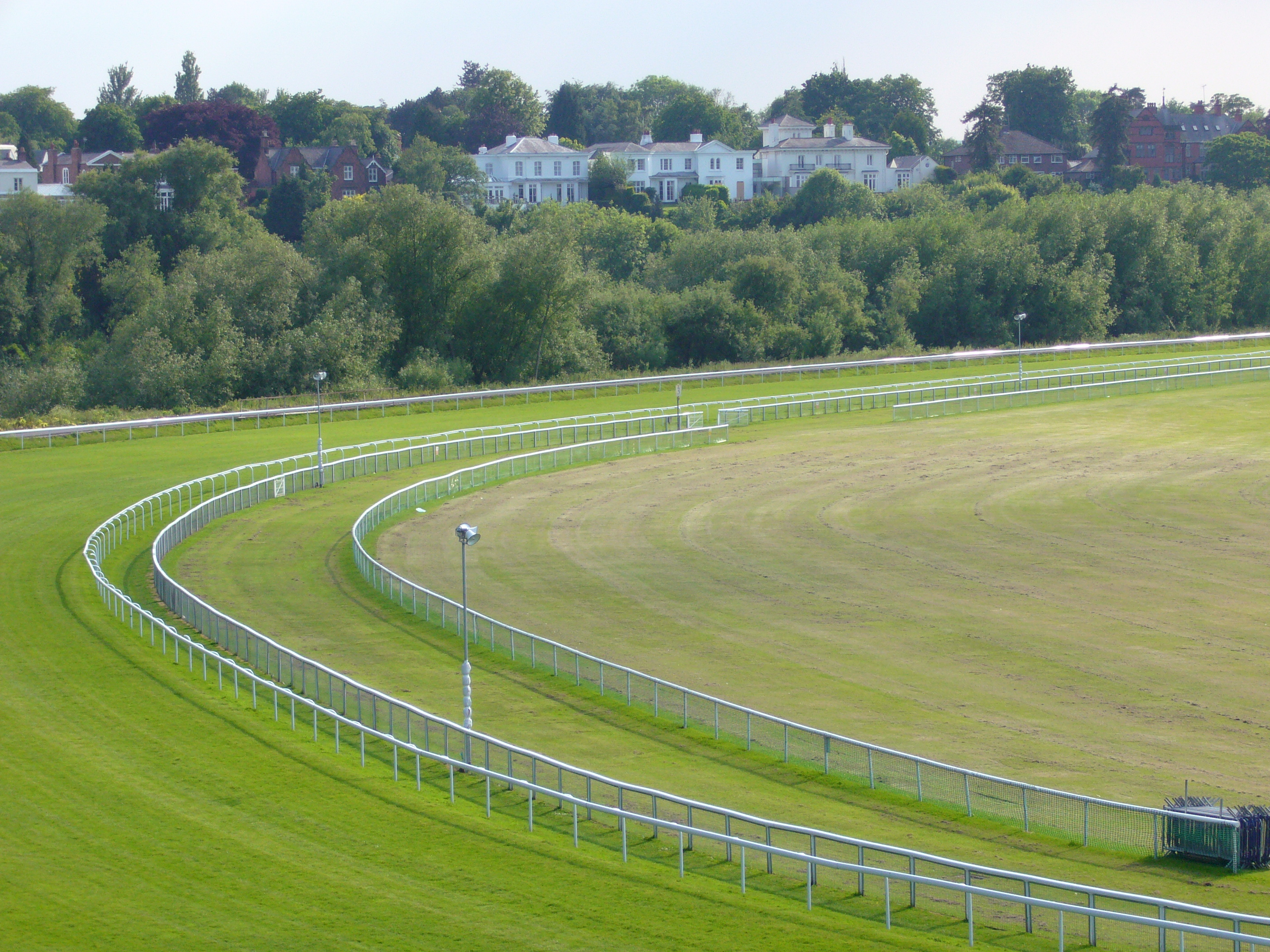
View across the Roodee to Curzon Park on the South bank of the River Dee.

Chester Racecourse, also known as the Roodee, is a racecourse located in Chester, England. The horse racing venue is officially recognised by Guinness World Records as the "oldest racecourse still in operation". Horse racing in Chester started in the early sixteenth century, with 1539 cited as the year racing began, although some sources give a date of 1512 for the first races in Chester. It is also thought to be the smallest racecourse of significance in England at 1 mile and 1 furlong (1.8 km) long.

== History ==
The 65-acre (26-hectare) racecourse lies on the banks of the River Dee. The site was once a harbour during the Roman settlement of the city during the Early Middle Ages, sometimes referred to as the Dark Ages, but was closed as the river silted up thus making navigation impossible. Towards the centre of the in field is a raised mound which is decorated by a small cross known as a "rood". It is from this that the race course derives the name "Roodee"; Roodee is a corruption of "Rood Eye", meaning "The Island of the Cross", and is sometimes seen as "roody" in early sources.

According to legend the cross marks the burial site of a statue of the Virgin Mary sentenced to hang after causing the death of Lady Trawst, the wife of the Governor of Hawarden. The legend states that she had gone to church to pray for rain but when her prayers were answered by a tremendous thunderstorm the statue was loosened and fell, killing her. As a holy object, hanging or burning the statue would be sacrilege so the statue was left by the banks of the river and the tide carried it down to Chester. The statue was found guilty by a jury of 12 men. If the legend is true, then this is the first recorded case of a jury being used in a court. In an alternative version of the legend, the statue was instead carried to St John's Church. An ancient statue of the Virgin was recorded at the time of the reformation but may not be the same one. The statue was thrown down as a relic of popery, used as a whipping post for scholars and burned.

Less fanciful is a report from 1840 that the stone obelisk is the base of a cross that marked the boundary of the Benedictine Nunnery, the nunnery having been created in the mid 12th century, and dissolved in January 1540. The cross was known as the Rood Dee (the Dee cross), to distinguish it from the cross at St. Peter's Church.

The site was formerly the home of the original Chester Midsummer Watch Parade, temporarily banned by Oliver Cromwell but finally abolished in 1677.

The east of the race course abuts directly onto Chester's ancient city walls which were once used to moor Roman trading vessels, before the course of the river changed. Spectators can watch races for free from the walls which offer a clear view of the whole circuit. The Grosvenor Bridge, at one time the longest single arch bridge in the world, passes over the south-eastern corner. The north of the course is bordered by a long railway bridge carrying the North Wales Coast Line (shared with the Shrewsbury–Chester line) over the River Dee. The course is overlooked from the opposite bank of the river by the mansions of Curzon Park, which can be seen dominating the skyline from any of the three grandstands. The Welsh border is roughly a mile west of the racecourse.

== Horse racing ==
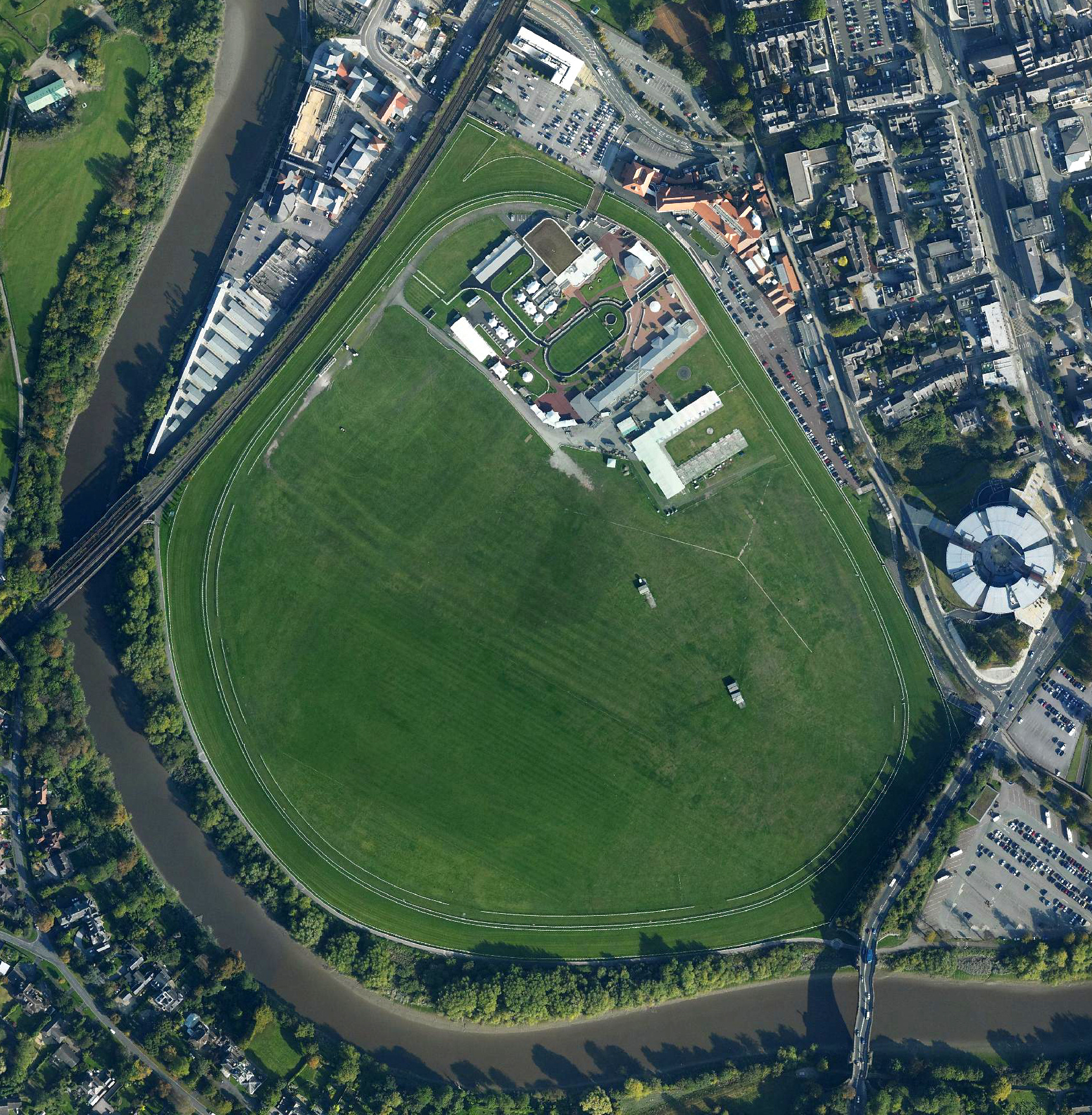
Aerial view of the Racecourse.

The Chester Racecourse site was home to the famous and bloody Goteddsday football match. The game was very violent and, in 1533, banned by the city, to be replaced in 1539 by horse racing. The first recorded race was held on 9 February 1539 (although other sources list this as 10 January 1511 and some as 1512) with the consent of the Mayor Henry Gee, whose name led to the use of the term "gee-gee" for horses. Races originally took place on Goteddsday (Shrove Tuesday) until 1609, and thereafter on St George's Day, both major festivals during the medieval period. Victors were awarded the "Chester Bells", a set of three decorative bells for decorating the horse's bridle, for winning a race five times round the "roody" and from 1744 the "Grosvenor Gold Cup", a small tumbler made from solid gold (later silver). In 1745, the meeting became a four-day one, with one race on each day. In 1766 a May Festival was introduced. In 1824 the Tradesmen's Cup Race (the predecessor to the Chester Cup) was also introduced.

The racecourse was at that point still just an open field, with the first grandstand finished in 1817 and the first admittance fee not being taken until 1897. The stand was rebuilt in 1899–1900, and was replaced after being destroyed by arson in 1985.

== Today ==
The racecourse's position in the city makes race meetings at Chester very popular as it is only a very short stroll to all the hotels, bars, shopping and restaurants. The racecourse itself is just over 1-mile (1.6 km) long, flat and raced anti-clockwise or left-handed. The main characteristic of the course is the very short straight (239 yards (219 m)). As such, long-strided horses, which perform better on straights, are at a distinct disadvantage.

On 19 August 2006, Irish vocal pop band Westlife held a concert for their Face to Face Tour supporting their album Face to Face.

In 2008, a restaurant opened at the racecourse, named "1539", after the first year that horse racing took place in Chester.

In May 2012, all former Tote betting positions were replaced by the racecourse's own in-house chesterBET betting system.

In 2013 a new pub and restaurant called The White Horse was opened in the centre of the Course.

The main race meetings at Chester were often broadcast on Channel 4 Racing until 2016 and have been broadcast on ITV Racing since 2017.

The Clerk of the Course is Andrew Morris, who is also Clerk of the Course for sister course Bangor-on-Dee, which is a National Hunt jumps course.

Chester Racecourse has continually evolved to meet the needs and desires of modern racing fans, blending its rich history with a forward-thinking approach. In 2023, the racecourse introduced a state-of-the-art digital betting platform, which has enhanced the overall visitor experience

In 2023, Chester Racecourse is still one of the oldest and popular racecourses in the United Kingdom.

In addition to horse racing, the racecourse grounds serve as a venue for various other events throughout the year, including concerts, food festivals, and outdoor cinema screenings. Chester Racecourse has also broadened its culinary offerings, catering to a wide range of tastes from casual street food to fine dining experiences.

2023 also saw the introduction of a dynamic pricing system for Chester Races, designed to reward early bookings. The new system ensures the lowest ticket price at the point of checkout when tickets are added to the customer's basket, encouraging visitors to secure their spots at the events well in advance. There is no evidence to support dynamic ticketing pricing or that it provides additional early sales.

== Notable races ==
Month	Meeting	DOW	Race Name	Type	Grade	Distance	Age/Sex
May	Festival	Wednesday	Cheshire Oaks	Flat	Listed	1m 3f 79y	3yo only f
May	Festival	Wednesday	Chester Vase	Flat	Group 3	1m 4f 66y	3yo only
May	Festival	Thursday	Ormonde Stakes	Flat	Group 3	1m 5f 89y	4yo +
May	Festival	Thursday	Dee Stakes	Flat	Listed	1m 2f 75y	3yo only
May	Festival	Friday	Huxley Stakes	Flat	Group 2	1m 2f 75y	4yo +
May	Festival	Friday	Chester Cup	Flat	Handicap	2m 2f 147y	4yo +

Other races

- Earl Grosvenor Stakes
- City Plate
- Queensferry Stakes
- Henry Gee Stakes
- Stand Cup
- Lily Agnes Conditions Stakes

== Bibliography ==
- Cawthorne, George James; Herod, Richard S. (1902). Royal Ascot, Its History & Its Associations (PDF). London: A Treherne & Co.
- Horse-Racing: Its History and Early Records of the Principal and other Race Meetings with Anecdotes etc. London: Saunders, Otley & Co. 1863.
