= Ombudsman (horse) =

Irish-bred, British-trained Thoroughbred racehorse)

- Ombudman mid-race at the 2024 Prix Nureyev at Deauville, ridden by Ryan Moore
- Breed: Thoroughbred
- Sire: Night of Thunder
- Grandsire: Dubawi
- Dam: Syndicate
- Damsire: Dansili
- Sex: Colt
- Foaled: 12 April 2021
- Country: Ireland
- Color: Bay
- Breeder: James Hanly
- Owner: Godolphin
- Trainer: John & Thady Gosden
- Record: 14: 10-3-0
- Earnings: £4,154,948

Major wins
- Prix du Prince d'Orange (2024); Prince of Wales's Stakes (2025, 2026); International Stakes (2025); Dubai Turf (2026); Brigadier Gerard Stakes (2026); Champion Stakes (2026)

Awards
- Cartier Horse of the Year (2026); Cartier Champion Older Horse (2026); Timeform rating: 134

Ombudsman (foaled 12 April 2021), is an active Irish champion Thoroughbred racehorse. He made his debut as a three-year-old in June 2024 at a novice race in Newmarket, and went on to win or place in each of his following eight races. Ombudsman ended his three-year-old season undefeated in four races, with his last win of 2024 being the Grade 3 Prix du Prince d'Orange. In the next year, Ombudsman alternated between second and first places in his first 4 starts, where he claimed victory at the Prince of Wales's Stakes and International Stakes. After his win at the International Stakes, Ombudsman was placed at the top of the Longines World's Best Racehorse Rankings with a rating of 128. Ombudsman stayed at the top of the rankings until the final race of his four-year-old season at the Champion Stakes, where he lost to Calandagan by 2 1/4 lengths.

== Background ==
Ombudsman was bred by James Hanly at Ballyhimikin Stud near Nenagh, Ireland. He was sired by Night of Thunder, a successful racehorse who won the 2000 Guineas in 2014 as well as the 2015 Lockinge Stakes. Ombudsman's grandsire Dubawi is also a successful racehorse, with three Group 1 victories under his name, including the National Stakes, Irish 2,000 Guineas, and the Prix Jacques Le Marois. After retirement, Dubawi saw much success as a breeding stallion, siring multiple champion racehorses such as Rebel's Romance, Notable Speech, Modern Games, and many more.

Ombudsman was trained jointly by John and Thady Gosden under the ownership of Godolphin, the Maktoum family's private horse racing stable founded by Sheikh Mohammed Bin Rashid Al-Maktoum. The racing operation is headquartered in Dubai and has horses in Ireland, Australia, Japan, France, the UK, and the US. Godolphin's breeding sector, Darley Stud, has produced many top racehorses with six of the greatest being honored in the Godolphin Hall of Fame: the aforementioned Dubawi, Cody's Wish, Anamoe, Dubai Millennium, Fantastic Light, and Masar.

== Racing career ==
=== 2024: Three-year-old season ===
Ombudsman made his debut at a novice Stakes race at Newmarket Racecourse on 22 June 2024, racing over 1 mile with Benoit de la Sayette as jockey. For most of the race, he remained in the centre of the pack, but in the last furlong, he surged with a fast turn of foot to win by 1 1/4 lengths. Just under a month later, on 18 July, Ombudsman entered another novice stakes race at Leicester over 1 mile 2 furlongs with a new jockey, William Buick. He was held up in fourth or fifth position for the first mile. At the two-furlong mark he made his move, taking the lead inside the final furlong to win by a length.

For his next race, Ombudsman had his third jockey in three races, Ryan Moore, at the listed Prix Nureyev over 2000 metres. Once again he was ridden patiently for most of the race before pulling away from the rest of the field on the final straight to win by 3 1/2 lengths. Speaking about the race, trainer John Gosden stated, "That was run at a proper pace and the ground was fast enough," and that "He was immature last year and had problems with his knees, but he’s done everything right."

Ombudsman's final race of his three-year-old season came at the Prix du Prince d'Orange, the first group race of his career. For the majority of the race, Ombudsman stayed on the inside rail before he pushed through a gap to gain position with 400 meters left in the race. One seized the first place with about 150m left in the race and held on to the lead for a 1/2 length win.

=== 2025: Four-year-old season ===
On 29 May, Ombudsman entered the first race of his four-year-old season: the 1 mile 2 furlong Brigadier Gerard Stakes at Sandown Park. He started the race in the middle of the pack before moving to the outside about halfway through the race. In the final two furlongs, he attempted to chase down the leader, Almaqam, but was unable to take the lead and finished second, 1 3/4 lengths behind Almaqam. After the race, trainer Thady Gosden said, "It was a very pleasing run–it was his first outing for 263 days and he was giving three pounds to the winner as well... He has an entry in the Prince of Wales's Stakes and there is also the other mile-and-a-quarter races, so we'll see how he comes out of it and how the races are looking and go from there.”

For his first Group 1 race of his career, Ombudsman was entered in the 1 mile 2 furlong Prince of Wales's Stakes held at Ascot Racecourse on 18 June 2025. The race started at a rapid pace, with Aidan O'Brien's duo of the 13-8 favourite Los Angeles and 100-1 long shot Continuous setting very fast fractions. While attempting to find a way forward, Ombudsman's jockey William Buick was blocked due to the wall of horses in front. However, Buick found a gap by switching to the outside in the last 250m of the race. With a burst of speed in the final half furlong, Ombudsman won the race 2 lengths clear of any competition.

After his victory in the Prince of Wales's Stakes, Ombudsman's elder trainer John Gosden gave praise to owner Mohammed bin Rashid Al Maktoum:

"It was a case of waiting for the gap and this horse has an extraordinary turn of foot. He's a special horse and it's just a question of an owner giving you the time to let them mature and get there. Sheikh Mohammed is without doubt the nicest and easiest owner I've ever trained for, he says 'do what we think is right.' I never get pushed; he'd never be the horse he was unless I had such a patient owner."

Shortly after his win at the Prince of Wales's Stakes, Ombudsman was set to race again on 5 July at the Coral Eclipse, another 1 mile 2 furlong race. Unlike in many of his previous races, he made an early move to the outside of the field and stayed near the leaders for most of his race until his final surge. Ombudsman took a tenuous lead with one and a half furlongs left. However, Delacroix, who had been in a disadvantageous position for most of the race, displayed a turn of foot in the final seconds of the race to snatch the win from Ombudsman by a neck. In a post-race interview, John Gosden said, "I said before it could be a messy race and I was correct. We thought Delacroix would go forward and the French horse (Sosie) would sit handy and then it was all the other way around. That can happen in small fields.", and that "He's run a wonderful race. Full marks to the winner, he's outstayed us and at the end it was down to stamina."

An opportunity to avenge his narrow loss in the Coral Eclipse came quickly, as Ombudsman was entered in the International Stakes held at York Racecourse on 20 August 20, 2025. Similarly to his previous race, the field at the International Stakes was small, comprising six horses. Among the participants were Danon Decile, who won the 2024 Japanese Derby and the 2025 Dubai Sheema Classic; Daryz, a future Prix de l'Arc de Triomphe winner; and Delacroix, the horse who had narrowly defeated Ombudsman in their previous race. Similarly to the Coral Eclipse, Ombudsman remained near the front of the main group about a length behind the leader, Danon Decile. Leading the field was the pacemaker Birr Castle, who had about a 25-length lead as they were turning into the final straight. Ombudsman moved into second place with two furlongs left and a sizable gap between him and the leader. Inside the final furlong, Ombudsman took the lead from Birr Castle, finishing with s 3 1/2 length lead ahead of second-place Delacroix, avenging his loss at the Coral Eclipse.

When interviewed after the race, John Gosden said:

"Look, he's a lovely horse, a grand horse, he's picked up well and won it well and won it emphatically... The Eclipse was a muddling affair, as we said, and we'll leave it at that. It was a great win, but I thought for a moment that Andre (Fabre) was going to be the lucky man.", adding that "We never raced him at (age) 2, and he came along gradually. He's getting better and better, he's trained well, he was undefeated last year, and his only defeat this year was in the Eclipse, so he's a proper horse."

Ombudsman's final race of his four-year-old season took place on 18 October in the 1 mile 2 furlong Champion Stakes at Ascot. The field of eleven runners featured familiar runners such as Delacroix and Almaqam, both of whom had defeated Ombudsman before. In addition, the Champion Stakes featured another runner in Calandagan who, despite suffering four losses in a row between the end of 2024 and the beginning of 2025, had won two Group 1 races in the Grand Prix de Saint-Cloud and the King George Stakes leading up to the race.

In the Champion Stakes, Ombudsman would return to his usual strategy of holding up in the rear for the majority of the race. As the race approached its final phase, Calandagan and Ombudsman made simultaneous moves near the two-furlong pole with Calandagan being the one to seize the lead. Ombudsman attempted to catch up to Calandagan, but he failed the close the gap and was soundly defeated by 2 1/4 lengths.

Jockey William Buick spoke about the race afterwards:

"He ran a super race. He's had some season. We had a slightly awkward draw and there was a very good pace to run at. It was always going to be between myself and Calandagan (as it unfolded). I took the race to him but his stamina probably kicked in and in the last furlong he pulled away. I'm proud of his run."

=== 2026: Five-year-old season ===
For his first race of the 2026 season, Ombudsman was entered into the Dubai Turf over 1800m at Meydan Racecourse. He rode in the middle of the pack for most of the race before accelerating out of the final corner to win by 1 3/4 lengths. Because of this win, Ombudsman was granted an automatic berth for the Breeders' Cup Mile later in the autumn from the Breeders' Cup "Win and You're In" program.

After the race, John Gosden showered Ombudsman with praise and spoke about future plans for the horse:

“I was delighted with him in every way and he’s a big and strong horse, he’s five now and fully matured... I think you are looking Prince of Wales’s Stakes again and the Eclipse, Juddmonte International, those are the obvious big summer races... I’m sure he will go to stud at the end of the year so let’s be bold with him and Sheikh Mohammed is keen to take things on."

== Statistics ==
Date	Distance	Race	Grade	Course	Field	Finish	Winning Time	Winning (Losing) Margin	Winner (2nd Place)	Jockey	Ref
2024 – Three-year-old season
22 June	1 mile	Novice Stakes		Newmarket	14	1st	1:36.71	1 1/4 lengths	(Arabian Light)	Benoit de la Sayette	
18 July	1 1/4 miles	Novice Stakes		Leicester	13	1st	2:09.54	1 length	(Winston's Tipple)	William Buick	
21 August	2000 metres	Prix Nureyev	Listed	Deauville	9	1st	2:03.88	3 1/2 lengths	(Sons and Lovers)	Ryan Moore	
19 October	2000 metres	Prix du Prince d'Orange	G3	Longchamp	7	1st	2:11.42	1/2 length	(Start of Day)	William Buick	
2025 – Four-year-old season
29 May	1 1/4 miles	Brigadier Gerard Stakes	G3	Sandown Park	7	2nd	2:06.03	(1 3/4 lengths)	Almaqam	Ryan Moore	
18 June	1 1/4 miles	Prince of Wales's Stakes	G1	Ascot	8	1st	2:02.51	2 lengths	(Anmaat)	William Buick	
5 July	1 1/4 miles	Coral Eclipse	G1	Sandown Park	6	2nd	2:05.92	(neck)	Delacroix	William Buick	
20 August	1 mile 2 1/2 furlongs	International Stakes	G1	York	6	1st	2:07.90	3 1/2 lengths	(Delacroix)	William Buick	
18 October	1 1/4 miles	Champion Stakes	G1	Ascot	11	2nd	2.03.19	(2 1/4 lengths)	Calandagan	William Buick	
2026 – Five-year-old season
28 March	1800 metres	Dubai Turf	G1	Meydan	11	1st	1.47.46	1 3/4 lengths	(Quddwah)	William Buick	
28 May	1 1/4 miles	Brigadier Gerard Stakes	G3	Sandown Park	6	1st	2:06.44	neck	(Gethin)	William Buick	
17 June	1 1/4 miles	Prince of Wales's Stakes	G1	Ascot	6	1st	2:03.24	4 lengths	(Minnie Hauk)	William Buick	
19 August	1 mile 2 1/2 furlongs	International Stakes	G1	York	8	4th	2:08.44	(4 3/4) lengths	Item	William Buick	
17 October	1 1/4 miles	Champion Stakes	G1	Ascot	6	1st	2:04.22	3 3/4 lengths	(Calandagan)	William Buick	
29 November	2400m	Japan Cup	G1	Tokyo						William Buick	

== Pedigree ==
Pedigree of Ombudsman (IRE), bay colt, foaled 12 April 2021
Sire Night of Thunder (IRE)	Dubawi (IRE)	Dubai Millennium (GB)	Seeking the Gold (USA)
Sire Night of Thunder (IRE)	Dubawi (IRE)	Dubai Millennium (GB)	Colorado Dancer (IRE)
Sire Night of Thunder (IRE)	Dubawi (IRE)	Zomaradah (GB)	Deploy (GB)
Sire Night of Thunder (IRE)	Dubawi (IRE)	Zomaradah (GB)	Jawaher (IRE)
Sire Night of Thunder (IRE)	Forest Storm (GB)	Galileo (IRE)	Sadler's Wells (USA)
Sire Night of Thunder (IRE)	Forest Storm (GB)	Galileo (IRE)	Urban Sea (USA)
Sire Night of Thunder (IRE)	Forest Storm (GB)	Quiet Storm (IRE)	Desert Prince (IRE)
Sire Night of Thunder (IRE)	Forest Storm (GB)	Quiet Storm (IRE)	Hertford Castle (GB)
Dam Syndicate	Dansili (GB)	Danehill (USA)	Danzig (USA)
Dam Syndicate	Dansili (GB)	Danehill (USA)	Razyana (USA)
Dam Syndicate	Dansili (GB)	Hasili (IRE)	Kahyasi (IRE)
Dam Syndicate	Dansili (GB)	Hasili (IRE)	Kerali (GB)
Dam Syndicate	Indication (USA)	Sadler's Wells (USA)	Northern Dancer (CAN)
Dam Syndicate	Indication (USA)	Sadler's Wells (USA)	Fairy Bridge (USA)
Dam Syndicate	Indication (USA)	Insinuate (USA)	Mr. Prospector (USA)
Dam Syndicate	Indication (USA)	Insinuate (USA)	All at Sea (USA)

- Ombudsman is inbred 4s x 3d to Sadler's Wells, meaning that this stallion appears in the fourth generation on the sire side and third generation on the dam side of Ombudsman's pedigree.
