= Chester Midsummer Watch Parade =

Festival celebrated in Chester, England

Chester's Midsummer Watch Parade is a festival celebrated in Chester, England.

== History ==
A monk, Lucian, wrote of a Chester procession of clerics in the year 1195 in De laude Cestrie, and city annals mention a parade in 1397/8, but it was not until the mayoralty of Richard Goodman who served from November 1498 until November 1499 that the "Wach on Midsummer Eve was first sett out and begonne". At every summer solstice, Cestrians would march through the streets carrying torches and wearing costumes during years when the famous Chester Mystery Plays were not performed.

(A similar practise was performed every midwinter - the Christmas Eve Watch was a candlelit procession which would go from the mayor's house to the Common Hall where the keys to the city gates would be given to the mayor who, in turn, entrusted them to the watchmen who would keep the city safe over the festive season.)

In 1564 the midsummer watch parade included: 4 gyants, 1 unikorne, 1 dromodarye, 1 luce, 1 camell, 1 dragon, 6 hobbyhorses and 16 naked boys.

Putting the procession together was profitable for some and fun for others. An annual account includes: Buckram for the giants Hood 4s; Fine buckram for the giant's whiskers 10s 10d; Michael Linch for cutting the garnish whiskers and all the roses used in the work 10s; John Banion 15 days work at 1s, 15s; John Wright, 35 days chiding and brawling and hindering the workmen from their work, and allsoe for fuddleing and drinkeing with several ather leters and molestationers, just notrhing and wortily he declare it, 0s 0d.

Despite the cancellation of the mystery plays in 1575, (although they were performed again in 1578) and the banning of the midsummer parade in 1600 by the Protestant mayor, Henry Hardware, the tradition was revived by the next mayor Robert Brerewood, but without the devil in feathers and the naked boys. The parade continued for every year until the last quarter of the 17th century. The last Midsummer show was recorded in 1670, it was then moved to Whit Tuesday until 1678 and not revived until 1995.

The most famous part of the performance was the family of giants; massive pasteboard models of people carried by several performers. Other attractions included the dragon of Hell, the fools and the massive mounts, a precursor to modern floats - one was the 'Merchant's Mount', a pirate ship.

== Modern day ==
The parade takes place on the Saturday and Sunday closest to Midsummer and travels from the Cathedral, down Watergate Street, along the ring road, and then up a steep, narrow backstreet called 'Whitefriars' which leads to Bridge Street, and on to the Town Hall, where the parade ends with juggling, fire breathing and dancing.

The most famous attractions are a recreated family of giants and replica of the Merchant's Mount, as well as the Devil and Angel puppets and the flocks of geese, from 'Saint Werburgh's and Columba's Primary School'. Saint Werburgh is the patron saint of Chester, and is often portrayed as a goose.
