= Dunfermline (horse) =

British-bred Thoroughbred racehorse (1974–1989)

- Racing silks of Queen Elizabeth II
- Sire: Royal Palace
- Grandsire: Ballymoss
- Dam: Strathcona
- Damsire: St. Paddy
- Sex: Mare
- Foaled: 15 April 1974
- Country: United Kingdom
- Colour: Bay
- Breeder: Queen Elizabeth II
- Owner: Queen Elizabeth II
- Trainer: Dick Hern
- Record: 12:3-3-3

Major wins
- Epsom Oaks (1977); St. Leger Stakes (1977)

Honours
- Timeform Top-rated Three-year-old filly (1977); Timeform rating: 133
- Last updated on 25 August 2023

Dunfermline (1974–1989) was a British Thoroughbred racehorse and broodmare. In a career which lasted from July 1976 until August 1978, she ran twelve times and won three races. In 1977, the year of her owner Queen Elizabeth II's Silver Jubilee, she won two of the five British Classic Races. Dunfermline won the Oaks against other fillies in June and, in September, added the St Leger, beating double Prix de l'Arc de Triomphe winner Alleged – the only time Alleged was ever beaten. She raced without winning in 1978 before being retired to stud.

== Background ==
Dunfermline, a "rangy" bay filly with a white star, was bred by her owner Queen Elizabeth II. She was sired by the 1967 Derby winner Royal Palace who had previously had a disappointing record at stud. Her dam, Strathcona won one race and was sold by the Queen in 1976, the year before Dunfermline's greatest success: she was a half-sister to the Eclipse winner Canisbay. Dunfermline was sent into training with Major Dick Hern at West Ilsley in Berkshire. She was ridden in all of her races by Hern's stable jockeys: Joe Mercer as a two-year-old and Willie Carson thereafter.

== Racing career ==
=== 1976: two-year-old season ===
Dunfermline ran three times as a two-year-old in 1976. She failed to win but was placed in all of her starts. She finished second to Triple First in the May Hill Stakes at Doncaster and second again behind Miss Pinkie in the Argos Star Fillies Mile at Ascot.

=== 1977: three-year-old season ===
On her three-year-old debut, Dunfermline was sent to Newmarket in April to contest the Pretty Polly Stakes. She recorded her first win by beating Olwyn by four lengths in the ten furlong race. The form of Dunfermline's victory was boosted when Olwyn won the Irish 1000 Guineas in May.

In the Oaks, Dunfermline started at odds of 6/1 in a field of thirteen fillies. Her task was made easier when Durtal the Cheveley Park Stakes winner was withdrawn after sustaining an injury when going to the start. Dunfermline stayed on strongly in the closing stages to win by three quarters of a length from Freeze The Secret. Dunfermline reappeared in August in the Yorkshire Oaks. She appeared to be unsuited by the slow pace and finished third behind the Peter Walwyn trained filly Busaca.

In the St Leger at Doncaster, Dunfermline started at odds of 10/1 in a field of thirteen, with the Irish-trained colt Alleged being made odds-on favourite. Hern also entered a colt called Gregarious who acted as a pacemaker and led until half a mile from the finish. Alleged, ridden by Lester Piggott, took the lead but was soon challenged by Carson on Dunfermline. The colt and the filly pulled clear of the field in the final quarter mile with Dunfermline getting the better of a prolonged struggle to beat Alleged by one and half lengths. In the Prix de l'Arc de Triomphe at Longchamp in October, Dunfermline finished fourth behind Alleged. Later that month, she finished third behind Rex Magna and Trillion in the Prix Royal-Oak.

=== 1978: four-year-old season ===
Dunfermline stayed in training as a four-year-old but failed to win in three starts. Her best performance came when she finished second to Montcontour in the Hardwicke Stakes at Royal Ascot

== Assessment ==
Timeform gave Dunfermline a rating of 133 in 1977, making her the top-rated three-year-old filly in Europe. The rating was the third highest given to a three-year-old filly up to that time behind Coronation (135 in 1949) and Petite Etoile (134 in 1959).

In their book A Century of Champions, John Randall and Tony Morris rated Dunfermline a "great" Oaks winner and the eleventh best filly trained in Britain and Ireland in the 20th century.

== Stud career ==
Dunfermline was retired to stud, but made no impact as a broodmare. She died in 1989.

== Pedigree ==
Pedigree of Dunfermline (GB), bay mare, 1974
Sire Royal Palace (GB) 1964	Ballymoss (GB); 1954	Mossborough	Nearco
Sire Royal Palace (GB) 1964	Ballymoss (GB); 1954	Mossborough	All Moonshine
Sire Royal Palace (GB) 1964	Ballymoss (GB); 1954	Indian Call	Singapore
Sire Royal Palace (GB) 1964	Ballymoss (GB); 1954	Indian Call	Flittermere
Sire Royal Palace (GB) 1964	Crystal Palace (GB); 1956	Solar Slipper	Windsor Slipper
Sire Royal Palace (GB) 1964	Crystal Palace (GB); 1956	Solar Slipper	Solar Flower
Sire Royal Palace (GB) 1964	Crystal Palace (GB); 1956	Queen of Light	Borealis
Sire Royal Palace (GB) 1964	Crystal Palace (GB); 1956	Queen of Light	Picture Play
Dam Strathcona (GB) 1967	St. Paddy (GB); 1957	Aureole	Hyperion
Dam Strathcona (GB) 1967	St. Paddy (GB); 1957	Aureole	Angelola
Dam Strathcona (GB) 1967	St. Paddy (GB); 1957	Edie Kelly	Bois Roussel
Dam Strathcona (GB) 1967	St. Paddy (GB); 1957	Edie Kelly	Caerlissa
Dam Strathcona (GB) 1967	Stroma (GB); 1955	Luminary	Fair Trial
Dam Strathcona (GB) 1967	Stroma (GB); 1955	Luminary	Luciebella
Dam Strathcona (GB) 1967	Stroma (GB); 1955	Whoa Emma	Prince Chevalier
Dam Strathcona (GB) 1967	Stroma (GB); 1955	Whoa Emma	Ready (Family:12-d)
