= Mail The Desert =

Irish-bred Thoroughbred racehorse

- Sire: Desert Prince
- Grandsire: Green Desert
- Dam: Mail Boat
- Damsire: Formidable
- Sex: Mare
- Foaled: 23 January 2000
- Country: Ireland
- Colour: Bay
- Breeder: Sean Coughlan
- Owner: John Livock; Newsells Park Stud
- Trainer: Mick Channon
- Record: 10: 2-2-2
- Earnings: £172,634

Major wins
- Moyglare Stud Stakes (2002)

Awards
- Timeform rating 110

Mail The Desert (23 January 2000 – February 2015) was an Irish-bred, British-trained Thoroughbred racehorse and broodmare. As two-year-old in 2002 she ran seven times in just over three months, winning the Group 1 Moyglare Stud Stakes in Ireland as well as finishing second in the Prestige Stakes. In the following year she failed to win in three starts but was placed third in the Coronation Stakes. As a broodmare she produced five winners before dying in 2015 at the age of fifteen.

== Background ==
Mail The Desert was a bay mare bred in Ireland by Sean Coughlan. As a yearling in October 2001 she was consigned to the Goffs sale and was bought for 54,000 Irish guineas by the bloodstock agents Bloodhorse International. She entered the ownership of the "property entrepreneur" John Livock and was sent into training with Mick Channon at West Ilsley. She was ridden in all but one of her races by Steve Drowne.

Her sire Desert Prince was the top-rated European three-year-old colt of 1998 when he won the Irish 2000 Guineas, Prix du Moulin and Queen Elizabeth II Stakes. He had some success as a breeding stallion, with his other offspring including My Tent Or Yours, Outback Prince (The T J Smith), Oriental Magic (Scottish Derby), Mourilyan (March Stakes), France (Tetrarch Stakes) and Tarzi (Hyperion Stakes). Mail The Desert's dam Mail Boat was unraced but came from a very good family. She was descended from the influential broodmare Felucca, who was the ancestor of numerous major winners Cut Above, Sharp Edge, Longboat, Bireme, Indigenous and Fenomeno.

== Racing career ==
=== 2002: two-year-old season ===
Mail The Desert made her racecourse debut in a minor race over six furlongs on good to soft ground at Windsor Racecourse on 25 May. Starting at odds of 100/30 in a ten-runner field she took the lead a furlong out and won by two lengths from New Foundation. The filly was then stepped up in class for the Listed Albany Stakes at Royal Ascot on 22 June in which she finished fourth of the nineteen runners behind the David Elsworth-trained Duty Paid. Three weeks later she was sent to France for the Listed Prix Roland de Chambure over 1400 metres on very soft ground at Deauville and came home fourth behind Six Perfections. In the Star Stakes at Sandown Park two weeks later she ran third to Sister Bluebird, beaten just over half a length by the winner. The filly's busy schedule continued as she contested the Sweet Solera Stakes at Newmarket Racecourse on 10 August but ran poorly and finished seventh of the eight runners in a race won by Soviet Song. Mail The Desert was back on the track two weeks later for the Prestige Stakes at Goodwood Racecourse and produced an improved effort as she took second place, beaten one and a half lengths by the Barry Hills-trained favourite Geminiani.

On 1 September Mail The Desert ran for the seventh time when she was sent to Ireland to contest the Group 1 Moyglare Stud Stakes at the Curragh and stated at odds of 8/1 in a nine-runner field. The Lowther Stakes runner-up Danaskaya started favourite, while the other fancied runners included Pearl Dance, Szabo and Luminata (Silver Flash Stakes). Mail The Desert disputed the lead with Pearl Dance before establishing a narrow advantage a furlong out and stayed on well under pressure to win by a head from Luminata to give Steve Drowne his first win in Ireland. Pearl Dance and Danaskaya were a neck and half a length away in third and fourth. MickChannon said "I'm delighted... We keep turning up for these good races and all I said to the owner was that wherever Pearl Dance finished we'd be either half a length in front of her or half a length behind her... as well as having a fair bit of ability, Mail The Desert is tough and takes her races well."

Mail The Desert did not race again in 2002, missing intended targets in the Fillies' Mile and the Prix Marcel Boussac.

=== 2003: three-year-old season ===
Before the start of her second season, Mail The Desert was acquired by the Hertfordshire-based Newsells Park Stud.

The filly began her second campaign when she returned from an absence of over nine months to contest the Coronation Stakes at Royal Ascot on 20 June. Starting a 14/1 outsider she led for most of the way before being overtaken in the straight and finishing third behind Russian Rhythm and Soviet Song. In the following month Mail The Desert was sent to Germany for the Group 2 Grosser Porsche Preis over 1600 metres at Hoppegarten. She finished second to the locally trained colt Martillo after repeating the front-running tactics employed at Ascot. The filly was then dropped back in trip for the Prix Maurice de Gheest over 1300 metres at Deauville on 10 August. Ridden by Thierry Thulliez she never looked likely to win and came home tenth of the eleven finishers behind Porlezza.

== Breeding record ==
At the end of her racing career Mail The Desert was retired to become a broodmare for the Newsells Park Stud. She produced ten foals and five winners between 2005 and 2015:

- Crimson Dawn, a bay filly, foaled in 2005, sired by Fasliyev. Failed to win in two races.
- Postman, bay colt (later gelded), 2006, by Dr Fong. Won five races.
- Al Muthanaa, chestnut colt (gelded), 2007, by Pivotal. Won one race.
- Medicean Messenger, colt (gelded), 2008, by Medicean. Unraced.
- Mail Princess, chestnut filly, 2009, by Pivotal. Unraced.
- Michief N Mayhem, bay filly, 2010, by Nayef. Failed to win in 14 races.
- Pushkar, bay filly, 2011, by Danehill Dancer. Won one race.
- Desert Force, bay colt, 2012, by Equiano. Won four races.
- Zwayyan, chestnut colt, 2013, by Pivotal. Won four races.
- Mail Order, bay filly, 2015, by Nathaniel. Failed to win in five races.

Mail The Desert died after a bout of colic in February 2015.

== Pedigree ==
Pedigree of Mail The Desert (IRE) bay mare 2000
Sire Desert Prince (IRE) 1995	Green Desert (USA); 1983	Danzig	Northern Dancer
Sire Desert Prince (IRE) 1995	Green Desert (USA); 1983	Danzig	Pas de Nom
Sire Desert Prince (IRE) 1995	Green Desert (USA); 1983	Foreign Courier	Sir Ivor
Sire Desert Prince (IRE) 1995	Green Desert (USA); 1983	Foreign Courier	Courtly Dee
Sire Desert Prince (IRE) 1995	Flying Fairy (GB); 1983	Bustino	Busted
Sire Desert Prince (IRE) 1995	Flying Fairy (GB); 1983	Bustino	Ship Yard
Sire Desert Prince (IRE) 1995	Flying Fairy (GB); 1983	Fairy Footsteps	Mill Reef
Sire Desert Prince (IRE) 1995	Flying Fairy (GB); 1983	Fairy Footsteps	Glass Slipper
Dam Mail Boat (GB) 1993	Formidable (USA); 1975	Forli	Aristophanes
Dam Mail Boat (GB) 1993	Formidable (USA); 1975	Forli	Trevisa
Dam Mail Boat (GB) 1993	Formidable (USA); 1975	Native Partner	Raise A Native
Dam Mail Boat (GB) 1993	Formidable (USA); 1975	Native Partner	Dinner Partner
Dam Mail Boat (GB) 1993	Boathouse (GB); 1978	Habitat	Sir Gaylord
Dam Mail Boat (GB) 1993	Boathouse (GB); 1978	Habitat	Little Hut
Dam Mail Boat (GB) 1993	Boathouse (GB); 1978	Ripeck	Ribot
Dam Mail Boat (GB) 1993	Boathouse (GB); 1978	Ripeck	Kyak (family: 11-d)
