= Ripon Champion Two Years Old Trophy =

Flat horse race in Britain

- Class: Listed
- Location: Ripon Racecourse; Ripon, England
- Race type: Flat / Thoroughbred
- Sponsor: British Stallion Studs
- Website: Ripon

Race information
- Distance: 6f (1,207 metres)
- Surface: Turf
- Track: Straight
- Qualification: Two-year-olds
- Weight: 9 st 5 lb; Allowances 5 lb for fillies and mares Penalties; 5 lb for Group winners 3 lb for Listed winners
- Purse: £40,000 (2025); 1st: £22,408

Ripon Champion Two Years Old Trophy
2026
Silent Beauty	Rogue Jewel	Harry Knows

Previous years
2025
Anaisa	Awraad	Lam Yai
2024
Soldier's Heart	Benevento	Mearall
2023
Task Force	Matters Most	Seven Questions
2022
Shouldvebeenaring	Bolt Action	Star Of Lady
2021
Flotus	Hellomydarlin	Atomic Lady

2020-2011
2020
Bahrain Pride	Internationaldream	Terrichang
2019
Platinum Star	Lambeth Walk	Oh Purple Reign
2018
Sporting Chance	Gypsy Spirit	Sunsprite
2017
Enjazaat	Tip Two Win	Lake Volta
2016
Alicante Dawn	Private Matter	Grand Coalition
2015
Whitman	Chiringuita	Still On Top
2014
Izzthatright	Bossy Guest	Explosive Lady
2013
Supplicant	Riverboat Springs	Ventura Mist
2012
Deauville Prince	Melody Of Love	Botanic Garden
2011
Gerfalcon	Gold City	Compton

2010-2001
2010
Bathwick Bear	Mayson	Black Moth
2009
Hold Your Colour	Skylla	Di Stefano
2008
Desert Phantom	Favourite Girl	Zezao
2007
Fat Boy	Anosti	Cristal Clear
2006
Stevie Gee	Everymanforhimself	Rainbow Mirage
2005
Sir Xaar	Johannes	Campbeltown
2004
Space Shuttle	Abraxas Antelope	Sentiero Rosso
2003
Auditorium	Peak To Creek	Mac Love
2002
Cool Question	Harb	Polar Force
2001
Resplendent Cee	Million Percent	Kelsey Rose

2000-1991
2000
Baaridd	Piccolo Player	Imperial Dancer
1999
Invincible Spirit	Khasayl	Femme Fatale
1998
Boldly Goes	Anno Domini	Ace of Parkes
1997
Arkadian Hero	Land of Dreams	Mijana
1996
Indian Rocket	Omaha City	Just Visiting
1995
Kahir Almaydan	High Priority	Persian Secret
1994
Limerick Belle	Fard	Painted Madam
1993
Ehtfaal	Alanees	Bid For Blue
1992
Star Family Friend	Gymcrak Tiger	Nominator
1991
Colway Bold	Harvest Girl	Last Exit

1990-1988
1990
Anjiz	Big Blow	Timeless Times
1989
Green's Belle	Tod	Generals Daughter
1988
Wonder Dancer	Rahik	Sign People

The Ripon Champion Two Years Old Trophy is a Listed flat horse race in Great Britain open to horses aged two years. It is run at Ripon over a distance of 6 furlongs (1,207 metres), and it is scheduled to take place each year in August.

== History ==
The inaugural running took place in October 1960 over a distance of 1 mile. The race was reduced to its present distance in 1965.

== Winners ==
Year	Winner	Jockey	Trainer	Time
1960	Vinnie	Norman McIntosh	Sam Hall	1:48.80
1961	Lucky Brief	Brian Connorton	Snowy Gray	1:52.60
1962	Zaleucus	Doug Smith	Geoffrey Brooke	1:45.40
1963	Con Brio	Michael Hayes	Frank Armstrong	1:42.20
1964	Never A Fear	Albert Robson	Walter Wharton	1:46.80
1965	Audrey Joan	George Cadwaladr	Eric Cousins	1:15.60
1966	Horned Moon	Joe Sime	Reg Day	1:13.40
1967	Cheb's Lad	Brian Connorton	Snowy Gray	1:15.60
1968	Meldrum	Peter Hetherington	Ernie Weymes	1:15.60
1969	Sweet Revenge	Brian Connorton	Atty Corbett	1:15.40
1970	Madame's Share	Joe Mercer	Dick Hern	1:12.20
1971	High Top	Lester Piggott	Bernard van Cutsem	1:12.60
1972	Prince Chad	Eddie Hide	Herbert Jones	1:13.00
1973	Burwell	Johnny Seagrave	Mick Easterby	1:13.80
1974	Cry Of Truth	John Gorton	Bruce Hobbs	1:11.70
1975	Outer Circle	Geoff Lewis	Ian Balding	1:12.50
1976	Anax	Geoff Baxter	Bruce Hobbs	1:15.00
1977	Fast Colour	Jimmy Bleasdale	Harry Thomson Jones	1:13.00
1978	Alert	Eddie Hide	Clive Brittain	1:17.70
1979	Lingdale	Graham Sexton	Bill Elsey	1:17.00
1980	Noalto	Philip Robinson	Frankie Durr	1:11.60
1981	Glancing	Dean McKeown	William Hastings-Bass	1:12.70
1982	Top O' The North	John Murray	Mick Easterby	1:16.10
1983	Idolized	Paul Eddery	Ernie Weymes	1:11.80
1984	Provideo	Tony Ives	Bill O'Gorman	1:15.20
1988	Wonder Dancer	Kevin Darley	Alan Bailey	1:15.20
1989	Green's Belle	Michael Hills	William Jarvis	1:13.50
1990	Anjiz	Pat Eddery	Alex Scott	1:12.50
1991	Colway Bold	Dean McKeown	Bill Watts	1:11.00
1992	Star Family Friend	Philip Robinson	Mark Tompkins	1:15.30
1993	Ehtfaal	Richard Hills	Harry Thomson Jones	1:12.60
1994	Limerick Belle	John Carroll	Jack Berry	1:11.20
1995	Kahir Almaydan	Willie Carson	John Dunlop	1:10.90
1996	Indian Rocket	Willie Carson	John Dunlop	1:15.30
1997	Arkadian Hero	Pat Eddery	Luca Cumani	1:11.80
1998	Boldly Goes	Dean McKeown	Chris Fairhurst	1:12.40
1999	Invincible Spirit	Michael Kinane	John Dunlop	1:11.40
2000	Baaridd	Philip Robinson	Michael Jarvis	1:13.40
2001	Resplendent Cee	Johnny Murtagh	Peter Harris	1:12.00
2002	Cool Question	George Duffield	Sir Mark Prescott Bt	1:15.70
2003	Auditorium	Kieren Fallon	Sir Michael Stoute	1:15.62
2004	Space Shuttle	David Allan	Tim Easterby	1:14.63
2005	Sir Xaar	Philip Robinson	Bryan Smart	1:12.06
2006	Stevie Gee	Robert Winston	Alan Swinbank	1:15.82
2007	Fat Boy	Richard Hughes	Richard Hannon Sr.	1:12.56
2008	Desert Phantom	Richard Mullen	David Simcock	1:15.03
2009	Hold Your Colour	Eddie Ahern	Brian Meehan	1:12.46
2010	Bathwick Bear	Richard Evans	David Evans	1:13.65
2011	Gerfalcon	Martin Dwyer	Brian Meehan	1:13.89
2012	Deauville Prince	Richard Kingscote	Tom Dascombe	1:14.43
2013	Supplicant	Tony Hamilton	Richard Fahey	1:12.49
2014	Izzthatright	Tony Hamilton	Richard Fahey	1:12.57
2015	Whitman	Andrew Elliott	Mark Johnston	1:13.70
2016	Alicante Dawn	Connor Beasley	Bryan Smart	1:12.81
2017	Enjaazat	Jim Crowley	Owen Burrows	1:11.79
2018	Sporting Chance	Silvestre de Sousa	Simon Crisford	1:12.48
2019	Platinum Star	Callum Shepherd	Saeed bin Suroor	1:10.42
2020	Bahrain Pride	James Doyle	Simon & Ed Crisford	1:13.48
2021	Flotus	Silvestre de Sousa	Simon & Ed Crisford	1:11.78
2022	Shouldvebeenaring	Sean Levey	Richard Hannon Jr.	1:11.70
2023	Task Force	Rossa Ryan	Ralph Beckett	1:12.53
2024	Soldier's Heart	Harry Davies	Simon & Ed Crisford	1:10.51
2025	Anaisa	David Allan	Tim Easterby	1:10.69
2026	Silent Beauty	David Egan	Kevin Philipart De Foy	1:13.56

== See also ==
- Horse racing in Great Britain
- List of British flat horse races
