= Provideo =

Irish-bred Thoroughbred racehorse (1982–2000)

- Racing silks of Ahmed Foustok
- Sire: Godswalk
- Grandsire: Dancer's Image
- Dam: Nadwa
- Damsire: Tyrant
- Sex: Stallion
- Foaled: 4 January 1982
- Country: Ireland
- Colour: Brown
- Breeder: Ahmed Foustok
- Owner: Ahmed Foustok
- Trainer: Bill O'Gorman
- Record: 27: 16-7-1

Major wins
- Brocklesby Stakes (1984); Star Stakes (1984); Ripon Champion Two Years Old Trophy (1984)

Awards
- British Horse of the Year (1984); Timeform Horse of the Year (1984)

Provideo (4 January 1982 – 7 September 2000) was an Irish-bred, English-trained Thoroughbred racehorse and sire. In 1984 he set a 20th-century record for a British-trained two-year-old when he won sixteen of his twenty-four races. His most important successes were in two Listed races, the Star Stakes at Sandown Park and the Champion Two-Year-Old Trophy at Ripon Racecourse. Despite being rated twenty pounds below the best horses of the year, he was named Horse of the Year by the Timeform organisation and topped the official British Horse of the Year poll conducted by the Racegoers Club.

== Background ==
Provideo was a small, compact brown colt bred by his owner Ahmed Foustok and sired by the sprinter Godswalk. He was the second foal of his dam Nadwa, who won two minor races as a two-year-old in 1978. Like Nadwa, Provideo was trained throughout his career by Bill O'Gorman. Provideo raced in blinkers from his fifth start onwards and usually won his races from the front. He was sent into training with O'Gorman at Newmarket, Suffolk and was ridden in most of his races by Tony Ives. In the autumn of 1983 it had been decided that the yearling would be taken to be sold at the Doncaster sales, but O'Gorman was unable to travel having been kicked by another horse, and he decided instead to train the colt for racing.

== Racing career ==
Provideo began his racing career with a four-length win in the Brocklesby Stakes at Doncaster Racecourse in March. In the next three months he added a further eight wins: three at Catterick, two at Beverley and one each at Ripon, Lingfield Park and Folkestone. He had finished second in his four defeats. Despite his consistency, Provideo had shown himself to be an aggressive horse ("a devil to manage") and on one occasion he hospitalised a stable lad who entered his box unexpectedly. He was also difficult to manage on race-days, often misbehaving in the preliminaries and having to be mounted on the racecourse rather than the paddock. In July he recorded his tenth win when taking the Cock of the North Stakes at Haydock Park in a three-way photo-finish. Provideo followed up two days later at Pontefract and before the end of the month he had won a minor race at Windsor and the Listed Star Stakes at Sandown Park. The latter race saw him equal the 20th century record of thirteen wins by a British two-year-old which had been set by the filly Nagwa in 1975 and matched by Spindrifter in 1980.

Provideo made his first attempt to break the record when he was moved up to Group Three class and finished second to Petoski in the Lanson Champagne Stakes at Goodwood. After finishing second again in a race at York in August he was sent to Ripon for the Listed Ripon Champion Two Years Old Trophy. He won by one and a half lengths from Lobbit and received an enthusiastic reception from the crowd as he returned to the winner's enclosure. Having broken the modern record, Provideo's next target was the all-time best for a British two-year-old, the sixteen wins achieved by The Bard in 1885. In September he finished third in the Sirenia Stakes and then contracted a minor respiratory infection which delayed his record attempt until the end of the British flat racing season. In October he won a five-runner race at Doncaster and in the last week of the season he was sent to Redcar in November for the Dinsdale Spa Stakes, a minor event with prize money of £1,452. Racing against moderate opposition he started at odds of 1/8 and won by seven lengths to equal The Bard's record. As the British season had ended he was sent to California for his attempt to break the record in the Buckpasser Stakes at Hollywood Park. Racing at a distance beyond his best he finished unplaced for the first time in his career behind Overtump. O'Gorman later criticised his own decision to race the horse in the United States, saying that "It was stupid, I wish I hadn't sent him."

Provideo raced three times as a three-year-old without success. He finished second in a five furlong race at Haydock Park in April but was then off the course until autumn when he finished unplaced on his other two starts.

== Assessment and honours ==
At the end of his two-year-old season, Provideo was given a rating of 112 by the independent Timeform organisation. Despite being rated 24 pounds below the season's top rated horse El Gran Senor, Provideo was named Timeform's Horse of the Year. In their annual Racehorses of 1984 the organisation described him as "a colt who in terms of combined toughness, consistency, courage and character was without equal in Europe in 1984".

In the official British Horse of the Year poll, Provideo received 17 of the 30 votes to become the first two-year-old to win the award ahead of Teenoso (six votes) and El Gran Senor (five votes).

Tony Ives called Provideo "the toughest horse I ever rode", while admitting that he sometimes had to "batter" the colt to achieve success.

== Stud record ==
Provideo was exported to become a breeding stallion in Tasmania. He sired some winners, but few of top class. The most successful of his offspring was Black Rouge, a gelding who won the Sir Rupert Clarke Stakes in 1993. His last recorded foals were born in 2001. He died on 7 September 2000 in Tasmania.

== Pedigree ==
Pedigree of Provideo (GB), brown stallion 1982
| Sire Godswalk | Dancer's Image | Native Dancer | Polynesian |
| Sire Godswalk | Dancer's Image | Native Dancer | Geisha |
| Sire Godswalk | Dancer's Image | Noor's Image | Noor |
| Sire Godswalk | Dancer's Image | Noor's Image | Little Sphinx |
| Sire Godswalk | Kate's Intent | Intentionally | Intent |
| Sire Godswalk | Kate's Intent | Intentionally | My Recipe |
| Sire Godswalk | Kate's Intent | Julie Kate | Hill Prince |
| Sire Godswalk | Kate's Intent | Julie Kate | Doggin It' |
| Dam Nadwa | Tyrant | Bold Ruler | Nasrullah |
| Dam Nadwa | Tyrant | Bold Ruler | Miss Disco |
| Dam Nadwa | Tyrant | Anadem | My Babu |
| Dam Nadwa | Tyrant | Anadem | Anne of Essex |
| Dam Nadwa | Evening Storm | Arctic Storm | Arctic Star |
| Dam Nadwa | Evening Storm | Arctic Storm | Rabina |
| Dam Nadwa | Evening Storm | Evening Belle | Beau Sabreur |
| Dam Nadwa | Evening Storm | Evening Belle | Fair Terms (Family: 13-a) |

== See also ==
- List of leading Thoroughbred racehorses
