= Markab (horse) =

British-bred Thoroughbred racehorse

- Sire: Green Desert
- Grandsire: Danzig
- Dam: Hawafiz
- Damsire: Nashwan
- Sex: Gelding
- Foaled: 4 February 2003
- Country: United Kingdom
- Colour: Bay
- Breeder: Shadwell Stud
- Owner: Hamdan Al Maktoum; Tight Lines Partnership; Mosaic Racing
- Trainer: Freddy Head; Kevin Morgan; Henry Candy
- Record: 38: 9-6-3
- Earnings: £419,257

Major wins
- Great St. Wilfrid Stakes (2009); Greenlands Stakes (2010); Betfred Sprint Cup (2010); Leisure Stakes (2012)

Markab (foaled 4 February 2003) is a British-bred Thoroughbred racehorse. Originally trained in France, he did not race as a juvenile and won one minor race from six attempts as a three-year-old in 2006. He was then sold to race in England where he won three small handicap races in 2008 and the Great St. Wilfrid Stakes in the following year. After being transferred to the stable of Henry Candy he belatedly emerged as a top-class performer at the age of seven in 2010 when he won the Greenlands Stakes in Ireland before recording his biggest win in the Group One Betfred Sprint Cup. He remained in training for two more years, winning the Leisure Stakes in 2012 at the age of nine.

== Background ==
Markab is a bay gelding with a small white star and white socks on his hind legs bred in England by his owner Hamdan Al Maktoum's Shadwell Stud. He was sired by Green Desert who finished second to Dancing Brave in the 2000 Guineas and won the July Cup in 1986. As a breeding stallion Green Desert sired the winners of over 1,000 races, including Oasis Dream, Desert Prince, Sheikh Albadou and Cape Cross. Markab's dam Hawafiz showed some ability as a racecourse, winning two of her five races in 2000 and 2001, and was a distant female-line descendant of the influential British broodmare Molly Adare.

Markab was initially sent into training with Freddy Head in France. His name is an Arabic word مركب meaning "the saddle".

== Racing career ==
=== 2006 & 2007: early career ===
Markab was unraced as a two-year-old and spent his 2006 season competing in minor races in France. After finishing sixth on his debut he won a maiden race over 1600 metres over heavy ground at Maisons-Laffitte Racecourse on 31 March. He finished third in races at Saint-Cloud Racecourse and Maisons-Laffitte in May before being dropped to sprint distances. Racing over 1200 metres he was runner-up at Deauville Racecourse on 4 July before running third at Maisons-Laffitte later that month. He did not race again in 2006.

In March 2007 the colt was offered for sale at Doncaster and was bought for 33,000 guineas by the bloodstock agent E B Giles. He entered the ownership of the Tightlines Partnership and was moved to the stable of Kevin Morgan at Gazeley in Suffolk.

Markab did not run for his new connections until September when he contested a handicap race over seven and a half furlongs on good to firm ground at Chester Racecourse. He was never in contention and was tailed-off in last place when pulled up by his jockey Paul Mulrennan. After another lengthy break he ended the year by finishing seventh of the eight runners in a handicap on the synthetic Polytrack surface at Lingfield in December.

=== 2008: five-year-old season ===
Markab's first two starts of 2008 saw little improvement as he finished unplaced in minor handicaps on synthetic tracks at Lingfield and Kempton in January. In March he recorded his first win in Britain as he "stayed on grimly" to win a seven furlong handicap at Kempton at odds of 16/1. He was ridden in the race by Pat Cosgreve, who became his regular jockey. Racing on turf at Newcastle Racecourse in April he won again, leading from the start and winning by two and a half lengths in another small handicap race. Later that month he ran fifth in a more valuable handicap at Newbury Racecourse and then had another prolonged absence.

Four and half months after his last appearance, Markab finished fourth in a handicap on the Lingfield polytrack on 5 September. He was seventeenth of twenty-nine runners in a valuable handicap at Ascot Racecourse later that month and then ran poorly when unplaced at Kempton in October. He returned to Lingfield for his last three races of the year beginning with a win in a seven furlong handicap on 6 November and then finishing second in similar events on 22 November and 7 December.

=== 2009: six-year-old season ===
In 2009 Markab moved to the stable of the veteran Henry Candy at Kingston Warren in Oxfordshire although Cosgrave retained the ride on the gelding. From the start of the season he was moved up to compete in major handicap races on turf, starting with the Victoria Cup over seven furlongs at Ascot in May when he started a 25/1 outsider but raced prominently from the start before finishing sixth of the 27 runners behind Swift Gift. He then finished fourth of 26 to High Standing in the Wokingham Stakes and June and fourth of 26 again when favourite for the Stewards' Cup at Goodwood Racecourse on 1 August. Two weeks later the gelding was assigned a weight of 127 pounds for the Great St Wilfrid Stakes over six furlongs at Ripon Racecourse and started the 7/2 favourite against sixteen opponents. After racing prominently from the start he made a forward move in the last quarter mile gained the advantage inside the final furlong and won by a neck and a short head from Tamagin and Advanced. Cosgrave commented "I won on him when he was with Kevin Morgan and his owners wanted me to keep the ride. He was drawn on the wrong side in the Wokingham. At Goodwood I was criticised for making the running – which, incidentally, I didn't – but today I wanted to hang on to him. He always travels well and he has plenty of pace. I think he could be just as effective over a bit shorter."

Markab failed to win his two remaining races that year. He finished unplaced in the Portland Handicap and Doncaster Racecourse in September. He was then moved up to Group Three class for the first time to contest the Bengough Stakes at Ascot on 10 October and dead-heated for fifth place, three and a half lengths behind the winner Royal Rock.

=== 2010: seven-year-old season ===
As a seven-year-old, Markab began his campaign in a minor stakes race at Thirsk Racecourse on 17 April and led from the start before winning by a neck from the Barry Hills-trained favourite Damien. In May he was sent to Ireland for the Group Three Greenlands Stakes over six furlongs at the Curragh and started 100/30 favourite in an eleven-runner field with the best-fancied of his rivals being Alfred Nobel, Jimmy Styles (Ayr Gold Cup) and the Listed winner Rain Delayed. He again led from the start and stayed on well in the closing stages to win by two lengths from Snaefell. Cosgrave commented "I thought he looked a lot better today than the last day, he clocked a very quick time at Thirsk and I thought he had improved about 5lb or 7lb for the run so I hoped he would go well".

At Royal Ascot in June Markab was dropped back in distance to five furlongs for the first time in his career when he contested the King's Stand Stakes. Starting at odds of 14/1 he started well and tracked the leaders before moving up to challenge in the final furlong and finished second of the twelve runners behind the five-year-old Equiano. In the Hackwood Stakes at Newbury in July he started favourite but after leading for most of the way he faded in the closing stages and finished sixth behind Regal Parade. On 4 September Markab was one of thirteen horses to contest the Group One Betfred Sprint Cup over six furlongs on good-to-firm ground at Haydock Park and started at odds of 12/1. Starspangledbanner was made favourite, whilst the other runners included Kingsgate Native, Regal Parade, Lady of the Desert (Lowther Stakes) and Borderlescott. Cosgrave sent the gelding into the lead from the start and set the pace on the stands-side (the right-hand side from the jockeys' viewpoint). Despite edging towards the centre of the track in the closing stages and won from Lady of the Desert, Genki, Kingsgate Native, Starspangledbanner and Regal Parade, all of whom were racing on the opposite side of the course. His winning time of 1:09.40 was a new course record, and he became the joint-oldest winner of the race equaling the achievement of Boldboy who won as a seven-year-old in 1977. After the race Henry Candy commented "He got jarred up a little at Ascot. He has now won a Group One and it is incredible. I'd say 99.9 per cent of horses his age don't carry on improving but he has, and still is. He's bigger and stronger than ever, a very happy horse".

=== 2011 & 2012: later career ===
Markab failed to win in five starts in 2011, when he raced in the colours of Mosaic Racing. In May he finished unplaced in both the Duke of York Stakes and the Temple Stakes, after which Dane O'Neill took over from Cosgrave as his regular jockey. The gelding produced his best effort of the season in July when he finished second to the Wokingham Stakes winner Deacon Blues in the Hackwood Stakes. In his two remaining races he finished unplaced behind Moonlight Cloud in the Prix Maurice de Gheest and then ran fourth when favourite for the Listed Starlit Stakes at Goodwood in September.

Markab began his final season by finishing fourth in a minor race over six furlongs at Haydock on 12 May. Sixteen days later he started 11/4 second favourite behind Genki (winner of the Chipchase Stakes) in the Leisure Stakes at Windsor Racecourse, with the other three runners being Elnawin (Sirenia Stakes), Angels Will Fall (Princess Margaret Stakes) and Medicean Man. The nine-year-old led from the start and fought off the challenges of Elnawin and Angels Will Fall to win by three quarters of a length. Markab ended his racing career in the Listed Hopeful Stakes in which he set the pace before being overtaken in the final furlong and beaten a length into second place by Hitchens.

== Pedigree ==
Pedigree of Markab (GB), bay gelding, 2003
Sire Green Desert (USA) 1983	Danzig (USA); 1977	Northern Dancer	Nearctic
Sire Green Desert (USA) 1983	Danzig (USA); 1977	Northern Dancer	Natalma
Sire Green Desert (USA) 1983	Danzig (USA); 1977	Pas de Nom	Admiral's Voyage
Sire Green Desert (USA) 1983	Danzig (USA); 1977	Pas de Nom	Petitioner
Sire Green Desert (USA) 1983	Foreign Courier (USA); 1979	Sir Ivor	Sir Gaylord
Sire Green Desert (USA) 1983	Foreign Courier (USA); 1979	Sir Ivor	Attica
Sire Green Desert (USA) 1983	Foreign Courier (USA); 1979	Courtly Dee	Never Bend
Sire Green Desert (USA) 1983	Foreign Courier (USA); 1979	Courtly Dee	Tulle
Dam Hawafiz (GB) 1998	Nashwan (USA); 1986	Blushing Groom	Red God
Dam Hawafiz (GB) 1998	Nashwan (USA); 1986	Blushing Groom	Runaway Bride
Dam Hawafiz (GB) 1998	Nashwan (USA); 1986	Height of Fashion	Bustino
Dam Hawafiz (GB) 1998	Nashwan (USA); 1986	Height of Fashion	Highclere
Dam Hawafiz (GB) 1998	Taghareed (USA); 1991	Shadeed	Nijinsky
Dam Hawafiz (GB) 1998	Taghareed (USA); 1991	Shadeed	Continual
Dam Hawafiz (GB) 1998	Taghareed (USA); 1991	Alghuzaylah	Habitat
Dam Hawafiz (GB) 1998	Taghareed (USA); 1991	Alghuzaylah	Asian Princess (Family: 14-c)
