= Light Cavalry (horse) =

British-bred Thoroughbred racehorse

- Sire: Brigadier Gerard
- Grandsire: Queen's Hussar
- Dam: Glass Slipper
- Damsire: Relko
- Sex: Stallion
- Foaled: 7 February 1977
- Country: United Kingdom
- Colour: Bay
- Breeder: Jim Joel
- Owner: Jim Joel
- Trainer: Henry Cecil
- Record: 11:5-2-2

Major wins
- King Edward VII Stakes (1980); St Leger Stakes (1980); Princess of Wales's Stakes (1981)

Awards
- Timeform rating 95p (1979), 128 (1980), 124 (1981)

Light Cavalry (7 February 1977–2004) was a British Thoroughbred racehorse and sire best known for winning the classic St Leger Stakes in 1980. After winning his only race as a two-year-old, Light Cavalry was one of the best three-year-olds in Britain in 1980, winning the King Edward VII Stakes and being placed in the Chester Vase, Gordon Stakes and Great Voltigeur Stakes before winning the St Leger by four lengths. He remained in training in 1981 and won the Princess of Wales's Stakes, but his season was restricted by injury problems. After his retirement from racing he stood as a breeding stallion in the United States and Argentina with limited success.

== Background ==
Light Cavalry was a "big, rangy" heavily built bay horse with a white blaze and a white sock on his right hind leg bred by his owner Jim Joel. He was the only British classic winner sired by Brigadier Gerard, an outstanding racehorse who won seventeen of his eighteen races between 1970 and 1972 including the 2000 Guineas, Champion Stakes (twice), Eclipse Stakes and King George VI and Queen Elizabeth Stakes. Apart from Light Cavalry, his best offspring was probably the Champion Stakes winner Vayrann. Light Cavalry's dam Glass Slipper was a half-sister of the Derby winner Royal Palace and showed good form during a brief racing career, finishing second in the Musidora Stakes. A year after Light Cavalry was foaled, Glass Slipper produced Fairy Footsteps, a filly who won the 1000 Guineas in 1981. Joel sent the colt into training with Henry Cecil at his Warren Place stable in Newmarket, Suffolk. Light Cavalry was ridden in his all his races by the retained stable jockey: the veteran English jockeys Joe Mercer (as two-year-old and three-year-old) and Lester Piggott (as a four-year-old).

== Racing career ==
=== 1979: two-year-old season ===
On his racecourse debut, Light Cavalry contested a maiden race over seven furlong at Sandown Park Racecourse in October. He took the lead two furlongs from the finish and won comfortably by a length from Himalia. In their annual Racehorses of 1979, Timeform described him as having "considerable scope for improvement".

=== 1980: three-year-old season ===
Light Cavalry began his three-year-old season in May, when he contested the Group Three Chester Vase, a trial race for the Epsom Derby. He was settled behind the leaders in the early stages, but when asked to accelerate in the straight he made no progress and finished third behind Henbit and Moomba Masquerade. Later that month he was dropped in class for a handicap race at Newbury Racecourse over 1 1/2 miles. He started the odds-on favourite and won the race, but had to work hard to secure the prize from Ayyabaan, and was not particularly impressive.

Light Cavalry missed the Derby (won by Henbit) and reappeared in the Group Two King Edward VII Stakes at Royal Ascot in June when he started at odds of 9/2. Joe Mercer adopted more aggressive tactics, racing in first or second place throughout, and Light Cavalry responded by staying on strongly in the straight to win by three-quarters of a length and a length from Saviour and Saint Jonathon. Cecil then prepared the colt for the St Leger, beginning with a run in the Gordon Stakes at Goodwood Racecourse in July, when Light Cavalry finished third behind the Irish Derby runner-up Prince Bee and Fingal's Cave. Light Cavalry met Prince Bee in the Great Voltigeur Stakes at York Racecourse. Light Cavalry led from the start and went clear of the field in the straight but was overtaken in the final quarter mile and beaten two lengths by Prince Bee. In both of his defeats by Prince Bee, Light Cavalry had been conceding weight to the Dick Hern-trained colt.

Prince Bee was aimed at the Prix de l'Arc de Triomphe and Light Cavalry started the 3/1 second favourite against six opponents for the 204th running of the St Leger Stakes over 14 1/2 furlongs at Doncaster Racecourse on 13 September. The Alycidon Stakes winner Water Mill was a short-priced favourite, while the other contenders included Saviour, World Leader and the French-trained Lancastrian. The start of the race was delayed when Lancastrian threw of his jockey Freddy Head and broke loose, but the colt was sson reunited with his rider and was able to take part in the classic. Mercer repeated the tactics employed at York, taking the lead from the start and setting a steady pace before accelerating on the turn into the straight. Water Mill emerged as his only serious challenger, but Light Cavalry stayed on very strongly in the final quarter mile and drew away in the closing stages to win by four lengths. Water Mill finished second, four lengths clear of World Leader in third place.

=== 1981: four-year-old season ===
On his four-year-old debut, Light Cavalry started favourite for the John Porter Stakes over 1 1/2 miles at Newbury Racecourse in April. He ran very poorly, finishing unplaced behind Pelerin, and returned from the race with a tendon injury and a swollen hock, leading Cecil to speculate that the colt might never run again.

Light Cavalry recovered from his injuries in time to run in the Hardwicke Stakes at Royal Ascot in June. He set a strong pace from the start and stayed on after being overtaken in the straight and finished second, three lengths behind Pelerin, to whom he was conceding weight. In the Princess of Wales's Stakes at Newmarket Racecourse three weeks later, Light Cavalry conceded at least twelve pounds to his seven opponents in the Group Two Princess of Wales's Stakes in which he was ridden by Lester Piggott and started at odds of 11/4. Piggott sent Light Cavalry into the lead from the start and set a strong pace before being overtaken by Royal Fountain three furlongs from the finish but quickly regained the lead. A furlong from the finish Light Cavalry was challenged by Castle Keep and Centurius and appeared beaten but rallied under strong pressure and won by a neck. Light Cavalry was then aimed at the King George VI and Queen Elizabeth Stakes at Ascot in July, but suffered a recurrence of his tendon injury and appeared before the race with heavily bandaged legs. He led the race for a mile, but eventually finished last of the seven runners behind Shergar.

== Assessment ==
In 1979, the independent Timeform gave Light Cavalry a rating of 95p, the "p" indicating that the colt was likely to make more than normal improvement. In 1980, Timeform gave Light Cavalry a rating of 128, nine pounds below the top-rated horse Moorestyle. In the official International Classification he was rated the eighth-best three-year-old colt in Europe, four pounds below Moorestyle. In the following year, Timeform rated him at 124, while in the International Classification he was rated the fourth-best older male racehorse in Europe, and the tenth-best horse of any age.

In their book, A Century of Champions, based on the Timeform rating system, John Randall and Tony Morris rated Light Cavalry an "inferior" winner of the St Leger.

== Stud career ==
In September 1981, Light Cavalry was sold for an estimated $2,500,000 and exported to stand at Crescent Farm, Kentucky, U.S.A. at a stud fee of $12,500 a mare. He was exported to Argentina in 1987 and died in December 2004. The best of his offspring was probably Mr Light Tres who won the Argentinian Gran Premio del Jockey Club in 1992.

== Pedigree ==
Pedigree of Light Cavalry (GB), bay stallion, 1977
Sire Brigadier Gerard (GB) 1968	Queen's Hussar (GB); 1960	March Past	Petition
Sire Brigadier Gerard (GB) 1968	Queen's Hussar (GB); 1960	March Past	Marcelette
Sire Brigadier Gerard (GB) 1968	Queen's Hussar (GB); 1960	Jojo	Vilmorin
Sire Brigadier Gerard (GB) 1968	Queen's Hussar (GB); 1960	Jojo	Fairy Jane
Sire Brigadier Gerard (GB) 1968	La Paiva (GB); 1956	Prince Chevalier	Prince Rose
Sire Brigadier Gerard (GB) 1968	La Paiva (GB); 1956	Prince Chevalier	Chevalerie
Sire Brigadier Gerard (GB) 1968	La Paiva (GB); 1956	Brazen Molly	Horus
Sire Brigadier Gerard (GB) 1968	La Paiva (GB); 1956	Brazen Molly	Molly Adare
Dam Glass Slipper (GB) 1969	Relko (GB); 1960	Tanerko	Tantieme
Dam Glass Slipper (GB) 1969	Relko (GB); 1960	Tanerko	La Divine
Dam Glass Slipper (GB) 1969	Relko (GB); 1960	Relance	Relic
Dam Glass Slipper (GB) 1969	Relko (GB); 1960	Relance	Polaire
Dam Glass Slipper (GB) 1969	Crystal Palace (GB); 1956	Solar Slipper	Windsor Slipper
Dam Glass Slipper (GB) 1969	Crystal Palace (GB); 1956	Solar Slipper	Solar Slipper
Dam Glass Slipper (GB) 1969	Crystal Palace (GB); 1956	Queen of Light	Borealis
Dam Glass Slipper (GB) 1969	Crystal Palace (GB); 1956	Queen of Light	Picture Play (Family:1-s)
