= Picture Play =

British race horse

- Sire: Donatello
- Grandsire: Blenheim
- Dam: Amuse
- Damsire: Phalaris
- Sex: Mare
- Foaled: 1941
- Country: United Kingdom
- Colour: Bay
- Breeder: Jim Joel
- Owner: Jim Joel
- Trainer: John Evelyn Watts
- Record: 6: 3-0-1

Major wins
- 1000 Guineas Stakes (1944)

Picture Play (1941–1956) was a British Thoroughbred racehorse and broodmare, who raced during World War II and was best known for winning the classic 1000 Guineas in 1944. As a two-year-old she won twice from four races before winning the 1000 Guineas by four lengths on her three-year-old debut. She was injured in her only subsequent race and was retired to stud. She went on to become a very successful and influential broodmare, whose descendants have won seven classics and many other major races.

== Background ==
Picture Play was an exceptionally good-looking bay mare bred by her owner Jim Joel who had inherited a substantial stable of horses on the death of his father Jack Barnato Joel in 1940. The filly had a white star and a white sock on her left hind foot. She was from the third crop of foals sired by the French-bred stallion Donatello who won eight races when trained in Italy including the Gran Criterium, Gran Premio di Milano and Derby Italiano. After a slow start at stud he went on to sire many leading horses including Alycidon and Crepello. Picture Plays's dam, Amuse, showed little ability as a racehorse but came from an excellent family: she was a granddaughter of Joel's outstanding broodmare Absurdity, whose other descendants included Jest, Humorist and Black Jester. Joel sent the filly to his private trainer John Evelyn Watts (the son of John Watts) at his Foxhill Stable in Wiltshire.

Picture Play's racing career took place during World War II during which horse racing in Britain was subject to many restrictions. Several major racecourses, including Epsom and Doncaster, were closed for the duration of the conflict, either for safety reasons, or because they were being used by the military. Many important races were rescheduled to new dates and venues, often at short notice, and all five of the Classics were usually run at Newmarket. Wartime austerity also meant that prize money was reduced: Picture Play's 1000 Guineas was worth £1,777 compared to the £7,592 earned by Galatea in 1939.

== Racing career ==
=== 1943: two-year-old season ===
Picture Play won two of her four starts as a two-year-old, and showed promise when finishing third to Fair Fame in the Queen Mary Stakes, which was run that year at Newmarket Racecourse. On her final appearance of the season she finished unplaced behind the same filly in the Cheveley Park Stakes.

=== 1944: three-year-old season ===
On her three-year-old debut on 16 May Picture Play contested the 131st running of the 1000 Guineas which was run over the July course at Newmarket rather than its traditional home on the Rowley Mile. Ridden by Charlie Elliott she started at odds of 15/2 in an eleven-runner field. She won by four lengths from Grand Corniche, with Superior two lengths back in third place.

In the "New Oaks" run at Newmarket over one and a half miles a month later, Picture Play finished unplaced behind Hycilla. The filly was injured in the race and never ran again.

== Assessment ==
In their book A Century of Champions, based on a modified version of the Timeform system, John Randall and Tony Morris rated Picture Play an "average" winner of the 1000 Guineas.

== Breeding record ==
At the end of her racing career, Picture Play was retired to become a broodmare for her owner's Childwickbury Stud in Hertfordshire. Between 1947 and 1955 she produced at least seven foals. Through her daughters Red Shoes and Queen of Light she was the ancestor of numerous major winners.

- Full Hand, a chestnut colt (later gelded), foaled in 1947, sired by Straight Deal. Winner.
- Red Shoes, bay filly, 1948, by Bois Roussel. She was the dam of West Side Story (Yorkshire Oaks) and the female-line ancestor of User Friendly.
- Queen of Light, bay filly, 1949, by Borealis. Won Falmouth Stakes. At stud, she produced Ancient Lights (Dewhurst Stakes) and Crystal Palace (Falmouth Stakes, Nassau Stakes). Queen of Light's descendants have included Royal Palace, Fairy Footsteps, Light Cavalry, Moonshell, Lawman, Desert Prince, Cape Blanco, Stylish Century and Miss Finland.
- Boxwood, brown colt, 1950, by Bois Roussel. He had some success as a sire in Australia.
- Love Parade, bay filly, 1952 My Love. Winner.
- Royal Pageant, bay filly, 1953, by Prince Chevalier. Winner.
- Promulgation, bay colt, 1955, by Court Martial. Winner.

== Pedigree ==
Pedigree of Picture Play (GB), bay mare, 1941
Sire Donatello (FR) 1934	Blenheim (GB); 1927	Blandford	Swynford
Sire Donatello (FR) 1934	Blenheim (GB); 1927	Blandford	Blanche
Sire Donatello (FR) 1934	Blenheim (GB); 1927	Malva	Charles o'Malley
Sire Donatello (FR) 1934	Blenheim (GB); 1927	Malva	Wild Arum
Sire Donatello (FR) 1934	Delleana (ITY); 1925	Clarissimus	Radium
Sire Donatello (FR) 1934	Delleana (ITY); 1925	Clarissimus	Quintessence
Sire Donatello (FR) 1934	Delleana (ITY); 1925	Duccia di Buoninsegna	Bridge of Earn
Sire Donatello (FR) 1934	Delleana (ITY); 1925	Duccia di Buoninsegna	Dutch Mary
Dam Amuse (GB) 1927	Phalaris (GB); 1913	Polymelus	Cyllene
Dam Amuse (GB) 1927	Phalaris (GB); 1913	Polymelus	Maid Marian
Dam Amuse (GB) 1927	Phalaris (GB); 1913	Bromus	Sainfoin
Dam Amuse (GB) 1927	Phalaris (GB); 1913	Bromus	Cheery
Dam Amuse (GB) 1927	Gesture (GB); 1918	Sunstar	Sundridge
Dam Amuse (GB) 1927	Gesture (GB); 1918	Sunstar	Doris
Dam Amuse (GB) 1927	Gesture (GB); 1918	Absurdity	Melton
Dam Amuse (GB) 1927	Gesture (GB); 1918	Absurdity	Paradoxical (Family: 1-s)
