= Tony Ives =

English jockey (1952–2026)

Personal information
- Born: 7 February 1952 (age 74) Westow, North Yorkshire, England
- Died: 23 or 24 May 2026 Thailand
- Occupation: Jockey
- Height: 5 ft 2 in (157 cm)

Horse racing career
- Sport: Horse racing
- Career wins: Great Britain: 1,064 (1970–96), Worldwide: 2,000+

Major racing wins
- Major races Arlington Million (1985)

Racing awards
- Jockey on Provideo, Horse of the Year 1984

Significant horses
- Forest Flower, Provideo, Teleprompter
- Updated on 26 May 2026

Tony Alexander Ives (7 February 1952 – 23 or 24 May 2026) was a flat racing jockey who won over 2,000 races worldwide, including the 1985 Arlington Million on Teleprompter in a career that lasted over a quarter of a century.

== Early life ==
Ives was born at Westow, near Malton, on 7 February 1952. His father John was a trainer in Belgium and the Netherlands.

== Career ==
He was apprenticed first to Arthur Stephenson, but later moved to work with Snowy Wainwright. He had his first winner on Moor Court at Hamilton on 18 July 1970.

In 1974, he joined Reg Hollinshead as stable jockey. It was for Hollinshead he came closest to winning a British Classic with Remainder Man, finishing second in the 1978 2,000 Guineas and third in the Derby.

His most successful period came after moving to Newmarket to become stable jockey to Bill O’Gorman, who called him "the most stylish jockey in the country." In 1981, he finally secured the first of his 21 Group winners – Alma Ata in the Park Hill Stakes. The following season, he partnered the two year old Brondesbury to win its first six races for O'Gorman. However, this was surpassed in 1984, when Provideo set the record for most two year old wins in a season with 16 and was honoured with the Horse of the Year title. This also resulted in his best season numerically, winning a total of 90 races.

His biggest payday came the following year with a win on Teleprompter, trained by Bill Watts, in the 1985 Arlington Million. It was described later by fellow jockey Dale Gibson as "one of the boldest rides you will ever see in a major race... everyone thought Tony had gone off too fast, but he hadn’t and he judged the fractions to perfection." It was all the more remarkable considering that earlier that week, back in Britain, he had been kicked in the head by a horse. That year, he finished fifth in the jockeys' championship, his highest ever ranking.

His only Classic win came in 1987 when he won the Irish 1,000 Guineas for Ian Balding on Forest Flower. She had been the champion two-year-old filly despite being disqualified in the Cheveley Park Stakes. Among his other big British wins were three wins in the Magnet Cup at York – two on Chaumiere (1985–86) and one on Icona (1989). He also briefly rode for his idol, Lester Piggott, during Piggott's short training career.

In 1989, he left the UK for Hong Kong along with friend Philip Robinson and rode there and in Macau until 1993, once coming runner-up in the jockeys' championship. A back problem forced retirement on him in 1996. “I was getting no feeling in both my hands and my right leg. It was just an accumulation of old age and wear and tear. My hands were going cold and I had tingling in my right leg.” His last victory was at Lingfield on 10 August 1996 on board Paradise Navy.

After retiring, he became assistant trainer to Australian Geoff Allendorf in Macau and later Panamanian jockey Jose Corrales.

== Style ==
Ives rode with an ultra-short hold of the reins, which in the words of Dale Gibson helped with "keeping the revs up".

== Personal life ==
Ives had three children from his first marriage, and three with his second wife, Jiraporn, with whom he lived in Thailand. He was admitted to hospital in November 2024 with a blood infection. Friends from his racing days raised funds for his treatment. He spent his final days at home with his family.

== Major wins ==
France

- Grand Prix de Saint-Cloud – Sheriff's Star (1989)

(Republic of Ireland) Ireland

- Irish 1,000 Guineas – Forest Flower (1987)

United States

- Arlington Million – Teleprompter (1985)

== See also ==
- List of jockeys
