= Mick Channon =

English footballer (born 1948)

Personal information
- Full name: Michael Roger Channon
- Date of birth: 28 November 1948 (age 77)
- Place of birth: Orcheston, Wiltshire, England
- Height: 6 ft 0 in (1.83 m)
- Position: Forward

Youth career
- Shrewton
- 1964–1965: Southampton

Senior career*
Years	Team	Apps	(Gls)
1965–1977	Southampton	391	(157)
1974	→ Durban Celtic (loan)		
1977–1979	Manchester City	72	(24)
1978	→ Cape Town City (loan)		
1979–1982	Southampton	119	(28)
1981	→ Newcastle KB United (loan)	4	(3)
1981	→ Gosnells City (loan)	1	(1)
1982	Caroline Hill		
1982	Newcastle United	4	(1)
1982	Bristol Rovers	9	(0)
1982–1985	Norwich City	88	(16)
1983	→ Durban City (loan)		
1985	Miramar Rangers		
1985–1986	Portsmouth	34	(6)
1986–1987	Finn Harps	0	(0)
Total		722	(236)

International career
1970–1972	England U23	9	(3)
1972–1977	England	46	(21)
- * Club domestic league appearances and goals

Michael Roger Channon (born 28 November 1948) is an English former professional footballer who played as a forward and represented the England national team in the 1970s. Scoring over 250 goals in his career, mainly for Southampton, he became known for his trademark windmill goal celebration. Channon later became a successful racehorse trainer.

== Club career ==
=== Southampton ===
Channon was born in Orcheston, Wiltshire and made his debut for Southampton as a 17-year-old in 1966, scoring in a match against Bristol City. Within three years he had established himself as the club's main goalscorer and was consistent in front of goal at a time when Southampton were one of the less fashionable teams in English football's First Division. However, despite a record season tally of 21 goals for Southampton in 1974, the club was relegated to the Second Division at the end of the season.

Channon stayed loyal to Southampton despite obvious concerns for his international chances and was rewarded in 1976 which was a special year for Channon. Southampton were still in the Second Division but nevertheless enjoyed a dream run to the FA Cup final where they played Manchester United. Although Southampton were a lower division side, they were considerably more experienced than Manchester United's youthful team. Southampton won 1–0, with Channon playing a part in the winning goal scored late in the game by Bobby Stokes. It was his first domestic honour in the game.

=== Manchester City ===
In the 1977 close season, Channon left Southampton — still in the Second Division — to join Manchester City in a £300,000 deal. His new club were making progress, having just finished second in the First Division behind champions Liverpool, but this was where they peaked and Channon struggled to settle. He made 72 appearances and scored 24 goals during his time at Manchester City.

=== Return to Southampton ===
Channon went back to Southampton (by now back in the First Division) in September 1979. Now in his thirties, he continued to play regularly though his goals ratio was not good in his second spell, with only ten coming in each of his first two seasons back at the club. He joined Newcastle United in 1982 after playing 510 games for Southampton over two spells, scoring a total of 185 goals placing him top of the club's list of all-time goalscorers.

=== After Southampton ===
Channon lasted barely a month at Newcastle before joining Bristol Rovers. His impressive career seemingly on the decline, he failed to score in nine games for Bristol Rovers before a sudden departure again, this time to Norwich City where, at the age of 34, he found some of his old touch. He played 88 games over three seasons, scoring 16 goals, and suffered a mixed end to his Norwich career in 1985 when the club won the League Cup — Channon's second and final domestic honour — with a 1–0 win over Sunderland at Wembley, but were then relegated (with Sunderland) at the end of the same season. Channon joined Portsmouth and Finn Harps (where he played in one League of Ireland Cup game), before retiring from the game in 1986.

== International career ==
Called up to make his debut for the England national team by Alf Ramsey in October 1972, Channon played well enough in a 1–1 draw with Yugoslavia at Wembley to be selected for the squads for two subsequent qualifying matches for the 1974 FIFA World Cup, although he was not eventually in the team for either. However, he won his second cap in a famous 5–0 hammering of Scotland at Hampden Park in February 1973, scoring his first goal in the process.

As the year progressed, Channon scored again in a match against Wales and then added a brace in a 7–0 thumping of Austria before he was picked by Ramsey for his first competitive match – a crucial and ultimately infamous World Cup qualifier against Poland at Wembley. If England did not win, they would not qualify for the tournament. Channon, in his tenth England outing, was in an attacking line-up which spent pretty much the whole match in the Poland half, trying to break the deadlock. Channon saw his own chances saved by the eccentric but inspired goalkeeper Jan Tomaszewski and the game ended 1–1.

He played in a series of post-season friendlies for England, scoring in three of them and was kept in the side the following October as England began their campaign to qualify for the 1976 European Championships. Channon scored in the game against Czechoslovakia as England won 3–0. Channon's next goal for England was a while coming — in September 1975 — as England beat Switzerland in a friendly. England had two qualifying games left at the end of the year for the 1976 European Championships and Channon scored in both, but England lost 2–1 to Czechoslovakia in Bratislava and then only drew 1–1 with Portugal in Lisbon. England failed to qualify and Czechoslovakia went on to win the tournament.

After winning an FA Cup medal in the 1976 Final, Channon was back at Wembley days later to score twice in England's 4–0 win over Northern Ireland; he then scored again four days later against Scotland but England lost 2–1 at Hampden Park. There followed a summer tournament in the U.S. for the bi-centennial celebrations, and Channon scored twice in a thrilling game against Italy as England came from two goals down to win 3–2, whilst also becoming the first Southampton player to captain England. A fortnight later, Channon scored again as England defeated Finland 4–1 in Helsinki to get their qualification campaign for the 1978 FIFA World Cup off to a perfect start, though this would be tempered later by a defeat against Italy in Rome.

In March 1977, Channon scored twice as England beat Luxembourg at Wembley to get their World Cup campaign back on track; Luxembourg were the 'whipping boys' of the group and England would later need to demolish Luxembourg by a similar or better scoreline in Luxembourg to give themselves a chance of overhauling Italy and qualifying for the World Cup.

Channon hit his 20th England goal in a 2–1 win over Northern Ireland in May 1977. A week later came another Channon goal against Scotland – this time from the penalty spot – but this proved an infamous England defeat as the Scots won 2–1 and their fans invaded the Wembley pitch in celebration, ripping up clods of souvenir turf and pulling down one of the crossbars.

After an ill-fated move to Manchester City affected his form, Ron Greenwood chose to omit him from the starting line-up when England played the crucial World Cup qualifier in Luxembourg in October 1977. England won 2–0 and, despite victory over Italy in the last game of the campaign, the goals record was insufficient to take them to the World Cup. Channon was not selected for his country again; his international career ended with 46 appearances and a healthy 21 goals. England's failure to qualify for three major international tournaments during Channon's career leaves him as the most-capped player never to have been named to a World Cup or European Championships squad. As of 17 July 2018, he remains joint 18th in the all-time England scorers list, level with Kevin Keegan and Steven Gerrard.

== Horse racing ==
Channon always had an interest in horse racing during his football career. After retiring from full-time professional football in 1986, he began working as an assistant trainer, before becoming a licensed trainer in his own right in 1990. He initially had ten horses.

He then moved to the West Ilsley stables near Newbury, formerly owned by Queen Elizabeth II, and began to increase his number of horses, eventually ending up with almost 200.

In 2002, he ended the season with 123 winners, topping the 100-mark for the first time in his career.

In May 2012, he produced his first Classic winner when Samitar took the Irish 1,000 Guineas.

Among owners who had their horses with Channon are old football colleagues, including Kevin Keegan, Alan Ball, Chris Cattlin and Alex Ferguson.

In October 2022, Channon retired from training. His son Jack took over the licence.

== Personal life ==
On 27 August 2008, Channon was injured in a motorway accident on the M1. He was travelling from the Doncaster Sales to his West Ilsley stables in Berkshire when the accident happened. Channon was reported to have suffered a punctured lung and broken arm and jaw.

During an interview with Clare Balding broadcast on BBC One on 3 January 2009, Channon spoke about how, as a result of the broken jaw, he was subsequently fitted with metal plates in his face. Bloodstock agent and friend Tim Corby died in the accident.

He was the subject of This Is Your Life in 2001 when he was surprised by Michael Aspel while being interviewed at his West Ilsley racing stables near Newbury.

== Career statistics ==
=== International ===
Appearances and goals by national team and year
National team	Year	Apps	Goals
England	1972	1	0
England	1973	10	4
England	1974	10	4
England	1975	9	3
England	1976	8	6
England	1977	8	4
Total		46	21

Scores and results list England's goal tally first, score column indicates score after each Channon goal.

List of international goals scored by Mick Channon
No.	Date	Venue	Opponent	Score	Result	Competition	Ref.
1	14 February 1973	Hampden Park, Glasgow, Scotland	Scotland	3–0	5–0	Friendly	
2	15 May 1973	Wembley Stadium, London, England	Wales	2–0	3–0	1972–73 British Home Championship	
3	26 September 1973	Wembley Stadium, London, England	Austria	1–0	7–0	Friendly	
4	26 September 1973	Wembley Stadium, London, England	Austria	4–0	7–0	Friendly	
5	22 May 1974	Wembley Stadium, London, England	Argentina	1–0	2–2	Friendly	
6	29 May 1974	Zentralstadion, Leipzig, Germany	East Germany	1–1	1–1	Friendly	
7	5 June 1974	Red Star Stadium, Belgrade, Serbia	Yugoslavia	1–0	2–2	Friendly	
8	30 October 1974	Wembley Stadium, London, England	Czechoslovakia	1–0	3–0	UEFA Euro 1976 qualification	
9	3 September 1975	St. Jakob-Park, Basel, Switzerland	Switzerland	2–0	2–1	Friendly	
10	30 October 1975	Tehelné pole, Bratislava, Slovakia	Czechoslovakia	1–0	1–2	UEFA Euro 1976 qualification	
11	19 November 1975	Estádio José Alvalade, Lisbon, Portugal	Portugal	1–1	1–1	UEFA Euro 1976 qualification	
12	11 May 1976	Wembley Stadium, London, England	Northern Ireland	2–0	4–0	1975–76 British Home Championship	
13	11 May 1976	Wembley Stadium, London, England	Northern Ireland	4–0	4–0	1975–76 British Home Championship	
14	15 May 1976	Hampden Park, Glasgow, Scotland	Scotland	1–0	1–2	1975–76 British Home Championship	
15	28 May 1976	Yankee Stadium, New York City, USA	Italy	1–2	3–2	1976 U.S.A. Bicentennial Cup Tournament	
16	28 May 1976	Yankee Stadium, New York City, USA	Italy	3–2	3–2	1976 U.S.A. Bicentennial Cup Tournament	
17	13 June 1976	Helsinki Olympic Stadium, Helsinki, Finland	Finland	3–1	4–1	1976 FIFA World Cup qualification	
18	30 March 1977	Wembley Stadium, London, England	Luxembourg	4–0	5–0	1976 FIFA World Cup qualification	
19	30 March 1977	Wembley Stadium, London, England	Luxembourg	5–0	5–0	1976 FIFA World Cup qualification	
20	28 May 1977	Windsor Park, Belfast, Northern Ireland	Northern Ireland	1–1	2–1	1976–77 British Home Championship	
21	4 June 1977	Wembley Stadium, London, England	Scotland	1–2	1–2	1976–77 British Home Championship	

== Football honours ==
Southampton

- FA Cup: 1975–76

Norwich City

- Football League Cup: 1984–85

Individual

- Rothmans Golden Boots Awards: 1973, 1974

== Horse racing honours ==
=== Group 1 / Grade I wins ===
Great Britain

- Cheveley Park Stakes: Seazun (1999), Queen's Logic (2001)
- Dewhurst Stakes: Tobougg (2000)
- Falmouth Stakes: Music Show (2010)
- King's Stand Stakes: Piccolo (1995)
- Nunthorpe Stakes: Piccolo (1994)
- St. James's Palace Stakes: Zafeen (2003)
- Sun Chariot Stakes: Majestic Roi (2007)

Canada

- E. P. Taylor Stakes: Lahaleeb (2009)

France

- Grand Prix de Saint-Cloud: Youmzain (2008)
- Prix Morny: Silca's Sister (2005)
- Prix Rothschild: Ascension (2001)
- Prix de la Salamandre: Tobougg (2000)

Germany

- Preis von Europa: Youmzain (2006)

Ireland

- Irish 1,000 Guineas: Samitar (2012)
- Moyglare Stud Stakes: Mail The Desert (2002)

Italy

- Gran Criterium: Nayarra (2011)
- Premio Lydia Tesio: Eva's Request (2009)
- Premio Roma : Imperial Dancer (2003)
