= Godswalk =

American-bred Thoroughbred racehorse

- Sire: Dancer's Image
- Grandsire: Native Dancer
- Dam: Shaft light
- Damsire: Intentionally
- Sex: Stallion
- Foaled: 9 February 1974
- Country: United States
- Colour: Grey
- Breeder: Glade Valley Farms, Peter Fuller
- Owner: Patrick Gallagher; Robert Sangster
- Trainer: Christy Grassick; Vincent O'Brien
- Record: 11:8-2-1

Major wins
- Norfolk Stakes (1976); Ballyogan Stakes (1977); King's Stand Stakes (1977)

Awards
- Top-rated Irish two-year-old colt (1976); Timeform rating 123 (1976), 130 (1977)

Godswalk (9 February 1974 – 1 December 1988) was an American-bred, Irish-trained Thoroughbred racehorse and sire. A specialist sprinter, he won eight of his eleven races in a racing career which lasted from the spring of 1976 until September 1977. As a two-year-old he won five of his seven races including the Norfolk Stakes and was rated the best colt of his generation in Ireland. In the following year he established himself as one of the best sprinters in Europe, winning three of his four races including the Ballyogan Stakes in Ireland and the King's Stand Stakes in England. After his retirement from racing, Godswalk had some success as a sire of winners in Europe and Australia.

== Background ==
Godswalk was a "strong, compact" grey horse with a white star bred in Maryland by Glade Valley Farms and Peter Fuller. He was one of the best horses sired by Fuller's horse Dancer's Image who won the 1968 Kentucky Derby but was disqualified after traces of phenylbutazone were discovered in a post-race urinalysis. As a breeding stallion, he stood in Europe and Japan, siring several other good winners including the multiple Group One winner Lianga and the July Cup winner Saritamer. Godswalk's dam Kate's Intent was a successful racehorse in Canada.

As a yearling, Godswalk was sent to the Saratoga sales where he was bought for $61,000. He entered into the ownership of Patrick Gallagher and was sent to race in Europe where he was trained in Ireland by Christy Grassick.

== Racing career ==
=== 1976: two-year-old season ===
As a two-year-old, Godswalk was campaigned exclusively over the minimum distance of five furlongs. After finishing third on his racecourse debut he recorded impressive wins in minor events at the Curragh and Phoenix Park. At the Curragh in May he won the Marble Hill Stakes, taking the lead at half way and accelerating away from the field in the closing stages to beat Digitalis by five lengths, with Piney Ridge in third. In June, Godswalk was sent to England and moved up in class to contest the Norfolk Stakes at Royal Ascot. Ridden by Derrmot Hogan he started the 8/13 favourite against four opponents. He took the lead two furlongs from the finish and won by four lengths from the Italian colt Alpherat, with Hogan sitting motionless in the closing stages. Godswalk started favourite for the Phoenix Stakes, but proved no match for the filly Cloonlara and was beaten into second place by a margin of six lengths. The colt was scheduled to return to England for the Cornwallis Stakes at Ascot in October but the meeting was abandoned owing to the exceptionally wet, heavy ground. A week later, Godswalk ended his season in the Waterford Testimonial Stakes at the Curragh and won easily by four lengths at odds of 1/3.

At the end of the year, the colt was bought for £300,000 by the British businessman Robert Sangster and moved to the stable of Vincent O'Brien at Ballydoyle.

=== 1977: three-year-old season ===
As a three-year-old, Godswalk did not reappear until early June when he contested the Ballyogan Stakes over five furlongs at Leopardstown Racecourse. Ridden by Tommy Murphy he won very easily by six lengths from Piney Ridge. Thirteen days later the colt was sent to England and was ridden by Lester Piggott in the King's Stand Stakes at Royal Ascot. He started the 4/6 favourite against a field which included Girl Friend (Prix Maurice de Gheest), Gentilhombre (Cork and Orrery Stakes, Prix de l'Abbaye) and Raga Navarro (Palace House Stakes). Godswalk stumbled exiting the starting stalls, losing three lengths, but recovered quickly. He took the lead entering the final furlong and won by three quarters of a length and two lengths from Girl Friend and Haveroid.

It was intended that the colt would step up to six furlongs for the July Cup, but was ruled out of the race with a blood disorder. In the William Hill Sprint Championship at York Racecourse in August, Godswalk again started odds-on favourite and was ridden by Piggott. He was among the leaders from the start and looked the likely winner when going to front two furlongs from the finish, but began to struggle in the closing stages and was beaten a head by Haveroid. In September, Godswalk started favourite for Ireland's most valuable sprint race, the Airlie/Coolmore/Castle Hyde Championship Stakes over six furlongs at the Curragh for which his opponents included Sweet Mint and Cawston's Clown (Coventry Stakes). Godswalk went clear of the field approaching the final quarter mile and won by two and a half lengths despite being eased down in the closing stages.

== Assessment ==
There was no International Classification of European two-year-olds in 1976: the official handicappers of Britain, Ireland and France compiled separate rankings for horses which competed in those countries. In the Irish Free Handicap he was rated the best two-year-old colt, seven pounds behind the filly Cloonlara, and ahead of The Minstrel and Nebbiolo. In the British Free Handicap he was rated the second best juvenile of the season, five pound behind J O Tobin. In the same year, the independent Timeform organisation awarded Godswalk a rating of 123, eight pounds below their leading two-year-old Blushing Groom. In 1977, Godswalk was rated 130 by Timeform, one pound behind their leading sprinter Gentilhombre and eight pounds behind their horse of the year Alleged.

== Stud career ==
Godswalk stood as a breeding stallion for the Coolmore Stud and was also "shuttled" to stand in Australia for the Southern Hemisphere breeding season. His most notable offspring was the 1984 British Horse of the Year Provideo, but he also sired St Jude (Canterbury Guineas), Shearwalk (third in the 1983 Epsom Derby), Celestial Dancer (Prix de Meautry) and Godstone (Richmond Stakes). Godswalk died in Australia on 1 December 1988 at the age of fourteen.

== Pedigree ==
Pedigree of Godswalk, grey stallion, 1974
Sire Dancer's Image (USA) 1965	Native Dancer (USA); 1950	Polynesian	Unbreakable
Sire Dancer's Image (USA) 1965	Native Dancer (USA); 1950	Polynesian	Black Polly
Sire Dancer's Image (USA) 1965	Native Dancer (USA); 1950	Geisha	Discovery
Sire Dancer's Image (USA) 1965	Native Dancer (USA); 1950	Geisha	Miyako
Sire Dancer's Image (USA) 1965	Noors Image (USA); 1953	Noor	Nasrullah
Sire Dancer's Image (USA) 1965	Noors Image (USA); 1953	Noor	Queen of Baghdad
Sire Dancer's Image (USA) 1965	Noors Image (USA); 1953	Little Sphinx	Challenger
Sire Dancer's Image (USA) 1965	Noors Image (USA); 1953	Little Sphinx	Khara
Dam Kate's Intent (USA) 1964	Intentionally (USA); 1956	Intent	War Relic
Dam Kate's Intent (USA) 1964	Intentionally (USA); 1956	Intent	Li F.
Dam Kate's Intent (USA) 1964	Intentionally (USA); 1956	My Recipe	Discovery
Dam Kate's Intent (USA) 1964	Intentionally (USA); 1956	My Recipe	Perlette
Dam Kate's Intent (USA) 1964	Julie Kate (USA); 1957	Hill Prince	Princequillo
Dam Kate's Intent (USA) 1964	Julie Kate (USA); 1957	Hill Prince	Hildene
Dam Kate's Intent (USA) 1964	Julie Kate (USA); 1957	Doggin' It	Bull Dog
Dam Kate's Intent (USA) 1964	Julie Kate (USA); 1957	Doggin' It	Passerine (Family 2-h)

- Godswalk was inbred 4 × 4 to Discovery, meaning that this stallion appears twice in the fourth generation of his pedigree.
