= Great St. Wilfrid Stakes =

Flat horse race in Britain

- Class: Handicap
- Location: Ripon Racecourse; Ripon, England
- Race type: Flat / Thoroughbred
- Sponsor: William Hill / MND Association
- Website: Ripon

Race information
- Distance: 6f (1,207 metres)
- Surface: Turf
- Track: Straight
- Qualification: Three-years-old and up
- Weight: Handicap
- Purse: £100,000 (2025); 1st: £51,540

Great St Wilfrid Handicap
2026
Royal Zabeel	I'm Next	Lord Roxby

Previous years
2025
Intervention	Kodiac Thriller	First Folio
2024
Dare To Hope	Ramazan	Secret Guest
2023
Sophia's Starlight	Summerghand	Wobwobwob
2022
Intrinsic Bond	Good Earth	Mark's Choice
2021
Justanotherbottle	Golden Apollo	Gale Force Maya

2020-2011
2020
Staxton	Royal Residence	Mr Lupton
2019
Dakota Gold	Summerghand	Citron Major
2018
Gunmetal	Dakota Gold	Growl
2017
Mattmu	Pipers Note	Shanghai Glory
2016
Nameitwhatyoulike	Intisaab	Baccarat
2015
Don't Touch	Kimberella	Tatlisu
2014
Out Do	Spinatrix	Confessional
2013
Baccarat	Spinatrix	Rodrigo De Torres
2012
Pepper Lane	Tax Free	Louis The Pious
2011
Pepper Lane	Our Jonathan	Mayson

2010-2001
2010
Damika	Tajneed	Signor Peltro
2009
Markab	Tamagin	Advanced
2008
Tajneed	Valery Borzov	Tamagin
2007
Kostar	Obe Brave	Indian Trail
2006
Excusez Moi	Fullandby	Ice Planet
2005
Ice Planet	Pieter Brueghel	River Falcon
2004
Smokin Beau	Pieter Brueghel	Hiccups
2003
Hidden Dragon	Undeterred	Mutawaqed
2002
Deceitful	Budelli	Artie
2001
Antonio Canova	Banjo Bay	Abbajabba

2000-1991
2000
William's Well	Blue Mountain	Bahamian Pirate
1999
Pipalong	Bon Ami	Now Look Here
1998
Cadeaux Cher	Emerging Market	Double Oscar
1997
Tadeo	Emerging Market	Tiler
1996
Samwar	Options Open	Fantasy Racing
1995
Double Blue	Lennox Lewis	Top Banana
1994
Whittle Woods Girl	Hever Golf Rose	For The Present
1993
Hard To Figure	Samsolom	Master Planner
1992
Green Dollar	Gorinsky	Red Rosein
1991
Premier Touch	Hinari Televideo	Prenonamoss

1990-1988
1990
Fascination Waltz	Cumbrian Waltzer	So Rhythmical
1989
Thornfield Boy	Erris Express	Sully's Choice
1988
Golden Ancona	Softly Spoken	Glencroft

The Great St. Wilfrid Stakes is a flat handicap horse race in Great Britain open to horses aged three years or older. It is run at Ripon over a distance of 6 furlongs (1,207 metres), and it is scheduled to take place each year in August.

The event is named after St. Wilfrid, the patron saint of Ripon. The winning owner is awarded a silver trophy depicting St. Wilfrid mounted on horseback.

The Great St. Wilfrid Stakes is the venue's most valuable race of the season. It has been sponsored by William Hill since 1994.

== History ==
The event was initially contested over a distance of one mile and two furlongs. In 1899 it was extended by two furlongs. It reverted to its original distance in 1948, before being reduced to six furlongs in 1956. The race was restricted to three year olds from 1947 to 1949.

== Records ==
Most successful horse (2 wins):

- Pepper Lane - 2011, 2012

Leading jockey since 1960 (3 wins):

- Philip Robinson - Betsy Red (1980), Never So Bold (1983), Kostar (2007)
- Daniel Tudhope - Pepper Lane (2011, 2012), Out Do (2014)
- Connor Beasley - Nameitwhatyoulike (2014), Dakota Gold (2019), Intrinsic Bond (2022)

Leading trainer since 1960 (3 wins):

- Mick Easterby – Lucky Dutch (1984), Catherines Well (1986), William's Well (2000)
- David O'Meara - Pepper Lane (2011, 2012), Out Do (2014)
- Tim Easterby - Pipalong (1999), Staxton (2020), Intrinsic Bond (2022)

== Winners since 1898 ==
- Weights given in stones and pounds.

Year	Winner	Age	Weight	Jockey	Trainer	SP	Time
1898	Queen's Park	3	7-06	Tom Lofthouse	Thomas Bruckshaw	9/2
1899	Her Ring	4	7-06	Seth Chandley	Ernest Tinsley	Evens F
1900	Lilly Thorpe	4	6–13	George Sanderson	Robert Gore	9/2
1901	Dark Eye	4	8-06	Charles Yarnell	William Elsey	6/4
1902	Boss Croker	3	7-00	Harvey	William I'Anson Jr.	7/4 F
1903
1904	Orrag	4	9-01	Elijah Wheatley	William Elsey	3/1
1905	Killigrew	4	7-03	Arthur Flanagan	Matthews	3/1
1906	Sweet Rosalind	3	7-02	Harry Blades	Unwin	7/4 F
1907	Swannington	7	8-06	William Griggs	James Fagan	11/4 F
1908	Noturnia	3	6-07	Charles Ringstead	Scott	5/2 F
1909	Downshire	5	11–13	William Griggs	Tom Waugh	7/2 F
1910	Mynora (Note: In 1910 Mynora was unnamed and ran as "Memoria filly".)	4	6–12	Arthur Flanagan	John Osborne Jr.	10/1
1911	Des-Essars	7	7-04	Charles Ringstead	William Cotcheifer	11/2
1912	Loup Chien	4	7-07	Michael Carron	William Binnie	7/2
1913	Sun Cloud	6	7-06	Herbert Robbins	William Yapp	2/1
1914	Pochard	4	7-07	James Ledson	Cole	2/1 JF
1915-18	No race
1919	Skager Rack	4	8-06	Charlie Foy	Alf Sadler Sr.	Evens F
1920	Jacksdale	4	7-02	Charles Ringstead	Ossie Casebourne	9/2
1921	Jacksdale	5	7-05	Tommy Morgan	Ossie Casebourne	5/2 F
1922	Wise Folly	4	7–13	Harry Wragg	Spittle	5/1
1923	Fastolite	5	8-09	Richard Crisp	William Walters	4/1
1924	Right Ho	4	7-01	Kenneth Robertson	J Dawson	10/1
1925	Seradella	3	7-03	William Alford	Cecil Boyd-Rochfort	13/8 F
1926	Hinton Bridge	4	7-08	Archie Burns	Major John Morris	3/1 JF
1927	Obvious	5	6–10	George Baines	Joe Cannon	100/8
1928	Servus	5	8-08	Ronald James	Percy Peck	10/11 F
1929	Sir Picton	7	6–10	Chris Adley	Percy Botterill	8/1
1930	Gigolo	5	7-09	Sam Wragg	Ossie Bell	6/4 F
1931	Kerr's Pink	5	7-09	Billy Nevett	Matthew D Peacock	7/1
1932	Sans Espoir	5	8-01	Sam Wragg	Frank Butters	13/8 F
1933	Craig Park	6	7–10	Freddy Lane	Willie Jarvis	9/4 F
1934	Simonside	5	8-01	Billy Nevett	Matthew D Peacock	4/1
1935	Moneybox	4	9-04	Billy Nevett	Matthew D Peacock	4/6 F
1936	Menton	4	8-01	Doug Smith	Frank Butters	7/1	2:44.00
1937	Miss Quiz	5	7-05	Percy Evans	Jim Storie	3/1	2:45.80
1938	Great Barton	4	8-01	Harry Blackshaw	Bill Wightman	100/7
1939	Nord Express	3	8–10	Sam Wragg	Ossie Bell	7/4 F	2:43.00
1940	No race
1941	Lovetin	4	7–11	Freddy Lane	Robert Colling	5/1	2:31.60
1942-45	No race
1946	Trimbush	6	9-07	Harry Blackshaw	Percy Vasey	6/4 F
1947	Good Company	3	8-00	Percy Evans	Harry Peacock	9/4	2:53.00
1948	Private Affair	3	6–13	Dennis Schofield	Rufus Beasley	100/8	2:06.40
1949	Tudor Emblem	3	7-00	Willie Christie	A Cooper	5/1	2:05.80
1950	Starpoint	4	8-05	Bill Rickaby	Sam Hall	10/1	2:05.60
1951	Presyl	3	7-08	Arthur Roberts	Richard Peacock	7/2	2:11.80
1952	Dader	3	7-07	Doug Smith	Marcus Marsh	4/5 F	2:06.40
1953	Torcross	4	9-04	Billy Nevett	Richard Peacock	9/2	2:06.20
1954	Whitebrigg	4	8-02	Stan Clayton	Avril Vasey	5/2	2:08.80
1955	Whitebrigg	5	7-07	Joe Sime	Avril Vasey	9/4	2:05.20
1956	Prairie Emblem	3	8-08	Peter Robinson	Bill Dutton	7/1	1:13.40
1957	Roman Vale	7	7–11	Ron Armstrong	Jack Fawcus	11/8 F	1:11.60
1958	Kandy-Sugar	3	8–13	Jimmy Etherington	William Bellerby	11/2	1:13.40
1959	Golden Leg	4	8-03	Greville Starkey	Michael Pope	8/1	1:12.60
1960	Whistler's Daughter	3	7-08	Norman McIntosh	Sam Hall	9/2	1:13.60
1961	Galivanter	5	9-07	Harry Carr	Dick Hern	4/5 F	1:12.60
1962	Whistling Sands	4	8-08	Paul Tulk	Eric Cousins	4/1 F	1:12.20
1963	Matatina	3	8-09	Lester Piggott	Sam Armstrong	5/6 F	1:16.00
1964	Miladdo	5	7–11	Peter Robinson	Eddie Duffy	9/2	1:11.80
1965	Monkey Palm	4	7-05	Willie Carson	Sam Armstrong	100/9	1:11.60
1966	Royal Yacht	5	7-03	Des Cullen	Bill Holden	100/8	1:14.80
1967	Gemini Six	3	7-07	Graham Sexton	Harry Wragg	9/4 F	1:16.80
1968	Morgan's Pride	4	7-01	David Coates	Steve Nesbitt	20/1	1:14.00
1969	Pals Passage	5	7–13	Willie McCaskill	Mick Easterby	9/2	1:12.60
1970	Bream	3	7–13	Ernie Johnson	Ernie Weymes	6/1	1:10.80
1971	Abandoned due to waterlogging
1972	Spanish Gold	5	7-05	Steve Perks	Reg Hollinshead	14/1	1:10.95
1973	Day Two	4	7–11	Mark Birch	Victor Mitchell	18/1	1:11.45
1974	Princely Son	5	9-03	Johnny Seagrave	Ken Cundell	7/1	1:13.20
1975	Blue Star	4	9-08	Eric Eldin	Arthur Stephenson	9/1	1:12.00
1976	Honeyblest	4	8–13	Geoff Baxter	Doug Smith	13/2	1:10.70
1977	Private Line	4	8–12	Eddie Hide	Clive Brittain	8/1	1:13.10
1978	Laser Lady	4	7-08	Michael Wood	Paul Cole	5/1	1:11.80
1979	Lord Rochfort	4	8–10	Steve Raymont	Brian Swift	7/2 F	1:15.90
1980	Betsy Red	3	8-07	Philip Robinson	Frankie Durr	8/1	1:14.29
1981	Belfort	4	7-09	Nicky Howe	Matty McCourt	11/2	1:11.50
1982	Soba	3	9-07	David Nicholls	David Chapman	9/4 F	1:12.50
1983	Never So Bold	3	8-03	Philip Robinson	Robert Armstrong	10/1	1:11.10
1984	Lucky Dutch	5	7–10	David Leadbitter	Mick Easterby	100/30 F	1:10.40
1985	Numismatist	6	8-05	Robert Street	M Salaman	11/2	1:14.60
1986	Catherines Well	3	8-08	Gary Carter	Mick Easterby	100/30	1:11.70
1987	Umbelata	4	8–10	Tony Culhane	Mick Naughton	7/1	1:15.60
1988	Golden Ancona	5	8-09	Mark Birch	Peter Easterby	4/1 F	1:16.40
1989	Thornfield Boy	3	8-06	Pat Eddery	Reg Akehurst	7/2 F	1:10.40
1990	Fascination Waltz	3	7–12	Gary Carter	John Mackie	9/2	1:12.20
1991	Premier Touch	4	9-07	Alex Greaves	David Barron	8/1	1:11.40
1992	Green Dollar	9	9-04	Michael Tebbutt	Eric Wheeler	16/1	1:12.30
1993	Hard to Figure	7	9-03	Steve Drowne	Ron Hodges	10/1	1:11.60
1994	Whittle Woods Girl	3	7-07	Jimmy Quinn	Eric Alston	20/1	1:11.00
1995	Double Blue	6	9–13	Jason Weaver	Mark Johnston	15/2	1:10.10
1996	Samwar	4	8-06	Ray Cochrane	Gay Kelleway	15/2	1:11.60
1997	Tadeo	4	9-08	Dean McKeown	Mark Johnston	12/1	1:09.80
1998	Cadeaux Cher	4	8-06	Ray Cochrane	Barry Hills	8/1	1:11.50
1999	Pipalong	3	9-07	Lindsay Charnock	Tim Easterby	16/1	1:13.00
2000	William's Well	6	7–13	Dale Gibson	Mick Easterby	14/1	1:11.30
2001	Antonio Canova	5	8-09	Franny Norton	Bob Jones	7/2 F	1:11.60
2002	Deceitful	4	8-08	Francis Ferris	David Evans	20/1	1:09.90
2003	Hidden Dragon	4	9-01	David Nolan	Paul Blockley	16/1	1:10.53
2004	Smokin Beau	7	9–10	Joe Fanning	Nick Littmoden	16/1	1:13.65
2005	Ice Planet	4	8-07	Phillip Makin	David Nicholls	10/1	1:13.19
2006	Excusez Moi	4	9-04	Kerrin McEvoy	Clive Brittain	10/1	1:13.82
2007	Kostar	6	9-06	Philip Robinson	Clive Cox	10/1	1:11.61
2008	Tajneed	5	8–12	Adrian Nicholls	David Nicholls	17/2	1:13.75
2009	Markab	6	9-03	Pat Cosgrave	Henry Candy	7/2 F	1:10.10
2010	Damika	7	8–10	Michael Stainton	Richard Whitaker	18/1	1:13.31
2011	Pepper Lane	4	8–12	Daniel Tudhope	David O'Meara	11/1	1:12.34
2012	Pepper Lane	5	9-01	Daniel Tudhope	David O'Meara	20/1	1:11.95
2013	Baccarat	4	8-09	Tony Hamilton	Richard Fahey	9/2 F	1:09.72
2014	Out Do	5	9-01	Daniel Tudhope	David O'Meara	7/1 F	1:12.79
2015	Do not Touch	3	8–12	Tony Hamilton	Richard Fahey	4/1 F	1:12.00
2016	Nameitwhatyoulike	7	8–13	Connor Beasley	Bryan Smart	16/1	1:10.14
2017	Mattmu	5	9-01	David Allan	Tim Easterby	25/1	1:11.72
2018	Gunmetal	5	9-00	Joe Fanning	David Barron	10/1	1:09.98
2019	Dakota Gold	5	9-07	Connor Beasley	Michael Dods	5/1 F	1:14.56
2020	Staxton	5	8-05	Duran Fentiman	Tim Easterby	4/1 F	1:11.71
2021	Justanotherbottle	7	8–12	Kevin Stott	Kevin Ryan	18/1	1:09.72
2022	Intrinsic Bond	5	8-07	Connor Beasley	Tracy Waggott	11/1	1:09.35
2023	Sophia's Starlight	3	8-07	Sam James	Grant Tuer	7/1	1:11.51
2024	Dare To Hope	4	8–11	Oisin Orr	Richard Fahey	9/2 F	1:09.53
2025	Intervention	8	8-02	William Pyle	Mick Appleby	16/1	1:10.77
2026	Royal Zabeel	5	9-07	Jason Watson	Mick Appleby	17/2	1:10.36

== See also ==
- Horse racing in Great Britain
- List of British flat horse races
