= Royal Palace (horse) =

British-bred Thoroughbred racehorse and sire (1964–1991)

- Racing silks of Jim Joel
- Sire: Ballymoss
- Grandsire: Mossborough
- Dam: Crystal Palace
- Damsire: Solar Slipper
- Sex: Stallion
- Foaled: 1964
- Country: Great Britain
- Colour: Bay
- Breeder: Jim Joel
- Owner: Jim Joel
- Trainer: Noel Murless
- Record: 11: 9-0-1
- Earnings: £166,063

Major wins
- Acomb Stakes (1966); Royal Lodge Stakes (1966); 2000 Guineas Stakes (1967); Epsom Derby (1967); Coronation Stakes (1968); Coronation Cup (1968); Prince of Wales's Stakes (1968); Eclipse Stakes (1968); King George VI and Queen Elizabeth Stakes (1968); Timeform rating: 131
- Last updated on 30 July 2024

Royal Palace (1964–1991) was a British Thoroughbred racehorse and sire. In a racing career which lasted from June 1966 until July 1968, he ran eleven times and won nine races. After being rated the best English-trained two-year-old of 1966, he won the first two legs of the Triple Crown, the 2000 Guineas and the Derby in 1967. He returned for an unbeaten four-year-old season in 1968 when he won five top-class races.

== Background ==
Royal Palace was a dark-coated bay horse with a white star and one white foot, bred and raced by Jim Joel, whose father and uncle were both major forces in British horse racing. He was sired by Ballymoss, the leading European racehorse of 1958 and a grandson of one of the most influential stallions in history, Nearco. His dam Crystal Palace was a successful racemare who won the Falmouth Stakes and the Nassau Stakes in 1959. She was also an important broodmare, producing Prince Consort (Princess of Wales's Stakes), Selhurst, (Hardwicke Stakes) and Glass Slipper, the dam of the Classic winners Light Cavalry, (St. Leger Stakes) and Fairy Footsteps, 1000 Guineas. Joel sent the colt into training with Noel Murless at his Warren Place stables in Newmarket, Suffolk.

== Racing career ==
=== 1966: two-year-old season ===
Royal Palace made his first racecourse appearance in the Coventry Stakes over six furlongs at Royal Ascot in June. He showed good early speed before finishing unplaced behind the Irish colt Bold Lad. After a break of two months, Royal Palace reappeared at the Ebor meeting at York Racecourse, where he won the Acomb Stakes. On his final run of the year, the colt returned to Ascot for the Royal Lodge Stakes over one mile. He was left behind at the start and was still in last place on the final turn, but then quickened past his opponents to win by one and a half lengths from Slip Stitch. In the Free Handicap, an assessment of the year's best two-year-olds, Royal Palace was ranked second, three pounds below Bold Lad.

=== 1967: three-year-old season ===
Royal Palace made his three-year-old debut in the 2000 Guineas at Newmarket, for which he started 100/30 joint-favourite with Bold Lad in a field of eighteen runners. He was not impressive in the paddock before the race, as he appeared to be agitated and was sweating freely. Ridden by the Australian Racing Hall of Fame jockey George Moore, he challenged for the lead in the final quarter mile and won by a short head from the French-trained colt Taj Dewan. The race was the first British Classic to use starting stalls. The victory was reportedly well-received owing to the popularity of Jim Joel, who was winning his first classic since Royal Palace's great-grandam Picture Play won the 1000 Guineas in 1944. At Epsom Downs Racecourse on 7 June, Royal Palace started 7/4 favourite for the Derby. An unusual feature of the build-up to the race was the huge public gamble on the outsider El Mighty, who was backed from odds of 200/1 to 25/1 after a Peterborough shopkeeper claimed to have seen the horse winning in a dream. El Mighty led the field into the straight, but Royal Palace was always well placed and took the lead two furlongs from the finish. He won by two and a half lengths, defeating Charles W. Engelhard, Jr.'s Ribocco with Dart Board two lengths further back in third.

Having won the first two legs of the Triple Crown, Royal Palace missed the important summer championship races to be prepared for the St Leger at Doncaster Racecourse. In August he sustained an injury which forced him to miss his trial race in the Great Voltigeur Stakes at York. He fell behind in his preparation and worked badly a week before the St Leger, leading his connections to withdraw him from the race. He returned for the Champion Stakes over ten furlongs at Newmarket in October, but failed to reproduce his best form, finishing third behind Reform and Taj Dewan.

=== 1968: four-year-old season ===
In 1968 the teenager Sandy Barclay replaced Moore and Royal Palace was undefeated in five races. He began by winning the Coronation Stakes at Sandown in May. He then won the Coronation Cup at Epsom and the Prince of Wales's Stakes at Royal Ascot.

In July, returned to Sandown for an exceptionally strong renewal of the Eclipse Stakes, in which his opponents included Taj Dewan and the 1968 Derby winner Sir Ivor, who started the 4/5 favourite. The race has been compared to the 1903 Eclipse, in which the Derby winners Ard Patrick and Rock Sand were opposed by the outstanding racemare Sceptre. Taj Dewan took the lead in the straight, and although Royal Palace produced a strong finish he appeared to have narrowly failed to catch the leader. The photo-finish, however, revealed that he had prevailed by a short-head from Taj Dewan, with Sir Ivor in three-quarters of a length behind in third. The race was rated forty-eighth in the Racing Post's 2005 listing of the "100 Greatest Races". On his final start, Royal Palace contested the King George VI and Queen Elizabeth Stakes at Ascot. His main rival was expected to be Ribero, who had defeated Sir Ivor in the Irish Derby. In the straight Royal Palace sustained an injury to the suspensory ligament in his left foreleg, but stayed on to win by half a length from Felicio, with the future Prix de l'Arc de Triomphe winner Topyo in third and Ribero fourth. The injury ended his racing career and he was retired to stud.

== Assessment and honours ==
Royal Palace was twice runner-up in Great Britain's Horse of the Year voting. His Timeform rating of 131 also marked him as a very good horse.

== Stud career ==
As a stallion, Royal Palace was owned jointly by Jim Joel, Hon. Lady Macdonald-Buchanan, and Lord Howard de Walden. Royal Palace sired some good winners, but his overall record was disappointing. His best flat runner was Dunfermline, winner of the 1977 Epsom Oaks and St. Leger Stakes for her owner, Queen Elizabeth II. Royal Palace later sired the triple Champion Hurdler, See You Then.

In 1991, at The National Stud near Newmarket, Suffolk in England, the twenty-seven-year-old Royal Palace was put down as a result of infirmities from old age. He is buried in The National Stud's horse cemetery.

== Pedigree ==
Pedigree of Royal Palace, bay stallion 1964
Sire Ballymoss	Mossborough	Nearco	Pharos
Sire Ballymoss	Mossborough	Nearco	Nogara
Sire Ballymoss	Mossborough	All Moonshine	Bobsleigh
Sire Ballymoss	Mossborough	All Moonshine	Selene
Sire Ballymoss	Indian Call	Singapore	Gainsborough
Sire Ballymoss	Indian Call	Singapore	Tetrabazzia
Sire Ballymoss	Indian Call	Flittermere	Buchan
Sire Ballymoss	Indian Call	Flittermere	Keysoe
Dam Crystal Palace	Solar Slipper	Windsor Slipper	Windsor Lad
Dam Crystal Palace	Solar Slipper	Windsor Slipper	Carpet Slipper
Dam Crystal Palace	Solar Slipper	Solar Flower	Solario
Dam Crystal Palace	Solar Slipper	Solar Flower	Serena
Dam Crystal Palace	Queen of Light	Borealis	Brumeux
Dam Crystal Palace	Queen of Light	Borealis	Aurora
Dam Crystal Palace	Queen of Light	Picture Play	Donatello
Dam Crystal Palace	Queen of Light	Picture Play	Amuse (Family: 1-s)
