= Teleprompter (horse) =

British-bred Thoroughbred racehorse

- Sire: Welsh Pageant
- Grandsire: Tudor Melody
- Dam: Ouija
- Damsire: Silly Season
- Sex: Gelding
- Foaled: 11 April 1980
- Country: United Kingdom
- Colour: Bay
- Breeder: Edward Stanley, 18th Earl of Derby
- Owner: Edward Stanley, 18th Earl of Derby
- Trainer: Bill Watts
- Record: 34:11-11-4

Major wins
- Pacemaker International Stakes (1984, 1985); Desmond Stakes (1984); Prix Quincey (1984); Queen Elizabeth II Stakes (1984); Arlington Million (1985)

Awards
- Top-rated older miler in Europe (1986); Timeform rating 104 in 1983; 122 in 1984; 130 in 1985; 124 in 1986; 119 in 1987

Teleprompter (11 April 1980 – October 2003) was a British thoroughbred racehorse best known for winning the fifth running of the Arlington Million in 1985, a victory that helped change the rules of racing in Europe. After being beaten in his only race as a two-year-old he was gelded and returned in 1983 to become a successful handicapper, winning four races. In the following year he made the transition to group races and won Pacemaker International Stakes, Desmond Stakes, Prix Quincey and Queen Elizabeth II Stakes. At a time when most of the top races in Europe were not open to him, the gelding recorded his greatest success in 1985 when he traveled to the United States to win the Arlington Million, one of the most valuable horse races in the world. Teleprompter won only one race after Arlington but continued to run in major races until his retirement in 1987. He died in 2003 at the age of twenty-three.

== Background ==
Teleprompter was a large, powerfully-built bay gelding with a large white star bred at the Woodlands stud by his owner the 18th Earl of Derby's Stanley Estate. He was sired by Welsh Pageant, a one-mile specialist whose wins included the Lockinge Stakes, Queen Anne Stakes and Queen Elizabeth II Stakes. Teleprompter's dam Ouija went on to produce Selection Board (also by Welsh Pageant), whose daughter Ouija Board was twice named Cartier Horse of the Year. Ouija was also closely related to the Australian champion Kingston Town.

Lord Derby sent Teleprompter into training with Bill Watts at Richmond in North Yorkshire. Watts, whose biggest previous success had been with Waterloo in the 1972 1000 Guineas, was a great-grandson of the nineteenth century jockey John Watts. Teleprompter usually raced in a set of black blinkers and a white sheepskin noseband.

== Racing career ==
=== 1982 and 1983: early career ===
On his only appearance as a two-year-old, Teleprompter finished unplaced in a race over seven furlongs. At the end of the season the horse was gelded on the instruction of his owner, who felt that the operation would improve him as a racehorse. In the following year he won a maiden race at Edinburgh Racecourse and handicap race at Carlisle, before being sent to Royal Ascot in June for the Britannia Stakes over one mile. He was towards the rear of the field in the early stages, but came through the field to take the lead in the closing stages and won by one and a half lengths from Amazon Prince and twenty-five others. Teleprompter did not win again in 1983 but was placed in his four remaining races, most notably the Cambridgeshire Handicap at Newmarket Racecourse in October when he started favourite and finished second by a head to the four-year-old Sagamore. In their annual "Racehorses of 1983" Timeform described him as a "big, strong, useful-looking gelding ... tends to hang and needs strong handling".

=== 1984: four-year-old season ===
Teleprompter finished unplaced over ten furlongs on his first race of 1984 and won a handicap over one mile at York Racecourse. At Royal Ascot where he raced in blinkers for the first time he was assigned top weight of 137 pounds for the Royal Hunt Cup and finished second by a length to Hawkley. Watts then moved the gelding up in class and sent him to Ireland for the Group 3 Pacemaker International Stakes at Phoenix Park Racecourse. Ridden by Brian Rouse, he took the lead soon after the start and was never overtaken, winning by a length from the Vincent O'Brien-trained favourite Salmon Leap. After failing to concede weight to the season's other leading gelding Bedtime in the Land of Burns Stakes at Ayr Racecourse he returned to Ireland and won the Desmond Stakes at the Curragh by two and a half lengths. He was then sent to France for the Prix Quincey at Deauville Racecourse in August. He won his third Group race of the season, beating the British-trained filly Brocade by a head.

Geldings were, at that time, barred from Group One races in Britain, on the grounds that they did nothing to improve the breed. The Queen Elizabeth II Stakes at Ascot in October was then a Group Two race and represented the highest level of competition open to Teleprompter in his home country. He was ridden by Willie Carson and started at odds of 11/2 against five opponents including the leading three-year-old colt Chief Singer, the Coronation Stakes winner Katies, and the four-year-old Sackford, who had won the race in 1983. Teleprompter led from the start, set a very fast pace, and turned into the straight several lengths clear the field. In the final furlong he was strongly challenged by Katies, but rallied in the final strides to win by a neck.

=== 1985: five-year-old season ===
Teleprompter again finished unplaced on his seasonal debut but then failed by only a short-head against Prismatic in Lockinge Stakes (then a Group Two race) at Newbury Racecourse. In July he was ridden by Tony Ives as won his second Pacemaker International, beating Northern Plain by six lengths and then finished second to Parliament in the Land of Burns Stakes.

In August Teleprompter was accompanied by his fellow British challengers King of Clubs and Free Guest as he was sent to contest the fifth running of the Arlington Million in Chicago. British-trained horses had had considerable success in the race: Tolomeo had won in 1983 after Madam Gay had run third and Be My Native had finished second in the first two runnings. The race was briefly under threat as many of the racecourse buildings had been destroyed by a fire on 31 July, but temporary stands were erected and a crowd of 35,000 were in attendance for what was known as the "Miracle Million". The American-trained runners included Gate Dancer, Greinton, Both Ends Burning (Oak Tree Invitational Stakes), Kings Island (Sunset Handicap) and Dahar (Prix Lupin). Teleprompter, started at odds of 14.2/1 in a thirteen-runner field, with Greinton and Dahar being made joint-favourites. He was ridden again by Ives, who was only cleared to ride on the Wednesday before the race, after being kicked in the head by a horse in England earlier in the week. The main concern for Watts and Ives was that the gelding, having mainly been campaigned over a mile, might struggle to stay the distance, especially after the ground was softened by heavy rain: Ives therefore sent the gelding into the front after a furlong and then slowed down to set a steady pace. On the final and turn Teleprompter accelerated and quickly opened up a three length advantage. Greinton emerged as a serious challenger, but Teleprompter held on to win by three-quarters of a length and claim a Grade I victory and first-prize money of £428,571. His win made him the biggest money-winner trained in Britain up to that time. Watts called the winner "very powerful, very strong ... he fights very hard".

After recovering from a "turbulent" flight back from Chicago, Teleprompter attempted to repeat his 1984 success in the Queen Elizabeth II Stakes. Unusually he was settled towards the rear of the field and struggled to obtain a clear run before making ground in the straight and finishing second to the 2000 Guineas winner Shadeed. On his final appearance of the year he was sent back to the United States and moved up in distance for the Breeders' Cup Turf over one and a half miles at Belmont Park. He took the lead soon after the start and opened up a clear advantage before being overtaken at the top of the stretch and dropping away to finish eighth behind Pebbles.

At the end of the season it was announced that most all-aged Group One races in Europe would be opened to geldings in the following year. The successes of Teleprompter were regarded as being an important factor in bringing about this change.

=== 1986 and 1987: later career ===
Teleprompter continued to run well in 1986 although he won only one of his eight races. He began the season by finishing second in the Lockinge Stakes but then injured his back when running third in the Queen Anne Stakes (then a Group Two race) at Royal Ascot. In July Teleprompter was able to contest a Group One race in Britain for the first when he (and Bedtime) ran in the Eclipse Stakes at Sandown Park Racecourse. He finished third of the eight runners behind Dancing Brave and Triptych. In the Land of Burns Stakes he pulled hard in the early stages before finishing third to Santiki. On 31 August the gelding started at odds of 10.8/1 as he attempted to win his second Budweiser Arlington Million. In contrast to the previous year however, he started poorly and was never able to reach the leaders eventually finishing seventh behind Estrapade.

In autumn he ran in his third consecutive Queen Elizabeth II Stakes and again ran well finishing second to the three-year-old Sure Blade, to whom he was conceding three pounds more than weight-for-age. His only victory came in October when he won the Breeder' Cup prep Mile, a newly created race run at Phoenix Park Racecourse. In November he ended his season with a run in the Washington, D.C. International at Laurel Park Racecourse where he started slowly and finished fifth behind Lieutenant's Lark.

Teleprompter began his final season promisingly by finishing second to Vertige in the Sandown Mile after leading until the final strides. In his next race however, he aggravated an old back injury when finishing unplaced in the Lockinge Stakes. He failed to reproduce his best form when he finished unplaced in the Queen Anne Stakes and the Pacemaker International and was retired.

== Assessment ==
In 1983 Teleprompter was given a Timeform rating of 104, suggesting that he was just below Group race standard. In the following year his rating improved to 122, and he appeared for the first time in the official International Classification where he was rated fourteen pounds behind the top-rated European older horse Teenoso. Teleprompter achieved a peak Timeform rating of 130 (the fourth-highest ever awarded to a gelding) in 1985: in the International Classification he was rated the seventh-best older horse in Europe, seven pounds below Rainbow Quest. Although his Timeform figure slipped to 124 in 1986, he achieved his only "championship" as the International classification rated him the best older horse in the 7 furlong plus division.

== Retirement ==
Teleprompter was retired from racing to his birthplace, Lord Derby's Woodlands Stud, and later spent many years at the New England Stud. He died at the age of twenty-three in 2003 and was buried at the Stanley House stud in Newmarket.

== Pedigree ==
Pedigree of Teleprompter (GB), bay gelding, 1980
Sire Welsh Pageant (FR) 1966	Tudor Melody (GB); 1956	Tudor Minstrel	Owen Tudor
Sire Welsh Pageant (FR) 1966	Tudor Melody (GB); 1956	Tudor Minstrel	Sansonnet
Sire Welsh Pageant (FR) 1966	Tudor Melody (GB); 1956	Matelda	Dante
Sire Welsh Pageant (FR) 1966	Tudor Melody (GB); 1956	Matelda	Fairly Hot
Sire Welsh Pageant (FR) 1966	Picture Light (FR); 1954	Court Martial	Fair Trial
Sire Welsh Pageant (FR) 1966	Picture Light (FR); 1954	Court Martial	Instantaneous
Sire Welsh Pageant (FR) 1966	Picture Light (FR); 1954	Double Deal	Borealis
Sire Welsh Pageant (FR) 1966	Picture Light (FR); 1954	Double Deal	Picture Play
Dam Ouija (GB) 1971	Silly Season (USA); 1962	Tom Fool	Menow
Dam Ouija (GB) 1971	Silly Season (USA); 1962	Tom Fool	Gaga
Dam Ouija (GB) 1971	Silly Season (USA); 1962	Queen of Light	Straight Deal
Dam Ouija (GB) 1971	Silly Season (USA); 1962	Queen of Light	Nonats
Dam Ouija (GB) 1971	Samanda (GB); 1956	Alycidon	Donatello
Dam Ouija (GB) 1971	Samanda (GB); 1956	Alycidon	Aurora
Dam Ouija (GB) 1971	Samanda (GB); 1956	Gradisca	Goya
Dam Ouija (GB) 1971	Samanda (GB); 1956	Gradisca	Phebe (Family: 12-b)
