= Fairy Footsteps =

Irish-bred Thoroughbred racehorse

- Sire: Mill Reef
- Grandsire: Never Bend
- Dam: Glass Slipper
- Damsire: Relko
- Sex: Mare
- Foaled: 15 January 1978
- Country: United Kingdom
- Colour: Bay
- Breeder: Jim Joel
- Owner: Jim Joel
- Trainer: Henry Cecil
- Record: 6:3-2-1

Major wins
- Waterford Candelabra Stakes (1980); Nell Gwyn Stakes (1981); 1000 Guineas (1981)

Awards
- Timeform rating: 118p (1980), 123 (1981)

Fairy Footsteps (15 January 1978 – 1996) was a British Thoroughbred racehorse and broodmare best known for winning the classic 1000 Guineas in 1981. She showed promise in her first two races as a two-year-old before establishing herself as one of the best fillies of her generation with an emphatic win in the Waterford Candelabra Stakes. In the spring of 1981 she was heavily backed for the 1000 Guineas before and after a win in the Nell Gwyn Stakes. She won the 1000 Guineas by leading all the way and was considered highly likely to follow up with a win in the Epsom Oaks but was retired after a disappointing defeat in the Musidora Stakes. She had some success as a broodmare.

== Background ==
Fairy Footsteps was a "well-made, robust" bay mare with a narrow white blaze and three white socks bred in Ireland by her owner Jim Joel. She was sired by Mill Reef, an American-bred horse who won the Epsom Derby, King George VI and Queen Elizabeth Stakes and Prix de l'Arc de Triomphe in 1971. Mill Reef's other offspring included Reference Point, Shirley Heights, Lashkari and Doyoun. An outbreak of metritis in Britain in 1977 saw many leading stallions operating at drastically reduced fertility and Fairy Footsteps was one of only nine foals sired by Mill Reef born in 1978. Fairy Footsteps' dam Glass Slipper was a half-sister of the Derby winner Royal Palace and showed good form during a brief racing career, finishing second in the Musidora Stakes. A year before Fairy Footsteps was foaled, Glass Slipper had produced Light Cavalry, a colt who won the St Leger in 1980.

== Racing career ==
=== 1980: two-year-old season ===
Fairy Footsteps made her racecourse debut in a maiden race over seven furlongs at Sandown Park Racecourse in July 1980. She came from last place on the turn into the straight to finish fourth of the sixteen runners behind Seasurf. She then finished second to Exclusively Raised in the Sweet Solera Stakes at Newmarket Racecourse, beaten 1 1/2 lengths. Later that month, Fairy Footsteps and Exclusively Raised met again in the Group Three Waterford Candelabra Stakes (the race now known as the Prestige Stakes) over seven furlongs at Goodwood Racecourse. Ridden for the first time by Pat Eddery she started third favourite at odds of 4/1. According to Timeform, she "ran rings round the opposition", taking the lead three furlongs from the finish and winning by 4 1/2 lengths from Madam Gay with Exclusively Raised in fourth and Leap Lively in fifth place. The winning time was a new course record for two-year-olds. She did not race again in 1980, but the form of her Goodwood win was boosted when Exclusively Raised won the May Hill Stakes and Leap Lively won the Fillies' Mile.

=== 1981: three-year-old season ===
Fairy Footsteps began her three-year-old season in the Nell Gwyn Stakes, a trial race for the 1000 Guineas at Newmarket in April. Before the race she had been the subject of heavy support in the betting for the Guineas, with her price being cut from 12/1 to 5/2. Ridden by Lester Piggott she started 4/6 favourite and led from the start to win very easily by 2 1/2 lengths from Shark Song. On 30 April 1981, Fairy Footsteps was one of fourteen fillies to contest the 168th running of the 1000 Guineas over the Rowley Mile course at Newmarket. Ridden again by Piggott, she was made the 6/4 favourite ahead of the previous year's champion filly Marwell. Piggott sent the filly into the lead from the start and set a reasonable pace, without ever breaking clear of her rivals. In the closing stages several challengers emerged but Fairy Footsteps ran on strongly and held on to win by a neck from Tolmi, with Go Leasing, Marwell and Madam Gay close behind. The win gave Piggott a twenty-fourth win in a classic. A week previously Piggott had been dragged under the stalls at Epsom Downs Racecourse, resulting in ear injury which required 32 stitches and damage to ligaments in his back. He was only able to return to riding on the eve of the Guineas and was still feeling the effects of the accident on the day of the race. He later commented that Fairy Footsteps' win "eased the discomfort".

Fairy Footsteps' breeding suggested that she was likely to be better suited by longer distances and she was very strongly fancied for The Oaks. At York Racecourse in May she started odds-on favourite for the Musidora Stakes over 10 1/2 furlongs. She appeared to be travelling well for most of the race, but began to struggle early in the straight and finished third of the five runners, beaten four lengths and one length by Condessa and Madam Gay. Fairy Footsteps remained in the Oaks field for a few days but then performed disappointingly in training and was withdrawn from the race. According to Henry Cecil: "The fact is that she does not stay. She moved smoothly but had nothing left after a mile. There is no point in running her in the Oaks". It was expected that Fairy Footsteps would return in the Coronation Stakes at Royal Ascot but she never raced again.

== Assessment ==
In the 1980 Free Handicap, a rating of the best two-year-olds of the season, Fairy Footsteps was allotted 122 pounds, eleven pounds below the top-rated Storm Bird and five pounds below the leading filly Marwell. The independent Timeform organisation gave her a rating of 118p, the "p" indicating that she was likely to make significant improvement. In the following year, Fairy Footsteps was given a rating of 123 by Timeform. In the official International Classification, she was rated nineteen pounds below the top-rated horse Shergar and nine pounds below the top-rated three-year-old filly Marwell. In their book, A Century of Champions, based on the Timeform rating system, John Randall and Tony Morris rated Fairy Footsteps an "average" winner of the 1000 Guineas.

== Stud career ==
Fairy Footsteps was retired from racing to become a broodmare for her owner's stud. She produced at least nine foals and six minor winners between 1983 and 1995:

- Flying Fairy (GB) : chesnut filly, foaled 1 January 1983, sired by Bustino (GB), failed to win in four races, dam of Desert Prince (Irish 2,000 Guineas, Prix du Moulin, Queen Elizabeth II Stakes)
- Lothario (GB) : chesnut colt (gelded), foaled in 1985, sired by Hello Gorgeous (USA) – unplaced in 2 starts on the flat in England 1988; unplaced 2 starts over hurdles in England 1989–90; unplaced 2 starts in steeple chases in England 1991
- Lovely Fairy (GB) : bay filly, foaled in 1986, sired by Beldale Flutter (USA) – won two races from 7 starts in England 1988–89
- Fleet Fairy (USA) : bay filly, foaled in 1987, sired by Teenoso (USA) – maiden, 3rd G3 Prix Penelope Saint-Cloud; 4th LR Prix Rose de Mai, Maisons-Laffitte
- Always Far (USA) : brown filly, foaled in 1989, sired by Alydar (USA) – unraced
- Haunted Wood (USA) : bay filly, foaled in 1990, sired by Nijinsky (CAN), won one race and placed once from 4 starts in England 1992-3
- Fabulous Fairy (USA) : chesnut filly, foaled 14 May 1991, sired by Alydar (USA), won one race from 5 starts in Britain 1993-4
- Swan Princess (USA) : bay filly, foaled in 1993, sired by Nureyev (USA) – unraced
- Sky Commander (USA) : brown colt, foaled 31 March 1994, sired by Storm Bird (CAN), won two races and placed 2nd twice from 7 starts in England 1996–97
- Brigade Charge (USA) : bay colt, foaled 7 April 1995, sired by Affirmed (USA) – won one race and placed 2nd once from 4 starts on the flat in England 1998; won once and placed five times from 12 starts over hurdles in Ireland and England 1999–2000; won twice and placed twice from 9 starts over fences in Ireland and England 2002-4

== Pedigree ==
Pedigree of Fairy Footsteps, bay mare, 1978
Sire Mill Reef (USA) 1968	Never Bend (USA); 1960	Nasrullah	Nearco
Sire Mill Reef (USA) 1968	Never Bend (USA); 1960	Nasrullah	Mumtaz Begum
Sire Mill Reef (USA) 1968	Never Bend (USA); 1960	Lalun	Djeddah
Sire Mill Reef (USA) 1968	Never Bend (USA); 1960	Lalun	Be Faithful
Sire Mill Reef (USA) 1968	Milan Mill (USA); 1962	Princequillo	Prince Rose
Sire Mill Reef (USA) 1968	Milan Mill (USA); 1962	Princequillo	Cosquilla
Sire Mill Reef (USA) 1968	Milan Mill (USA); 1962	Virginia Water	Count Fleet
Sire Mill Reef (USA) 1968	Milan Mill (USA); 1962	Virginia Water	Red Ray
Dam Glass Slipper (GB) 1969	Relko (GB); 1960	Tanerko	Tantieme
Dam Glass Slipper (GB) 1969	Relko (GB); 1960	Tanerko	La Divine
Dam Glass Slipper (GB) 1969	Relko (GB); 1960	Relance	Relic
Dam Glass Slipper (GB) 1969	Relko (GB); 1960	Relance	Polaire
Dam Glass Slipper (GB) 1969	Crystal Palace (GB); 1956	Solar Slipper	Windsor Slipper
Dam Glass Slipper (GB) 1969	Crystal Palace (GB); 1956	Solar Slipper	Solar Slipper
Dam Glass Slipper (GB) 1969	Crystal Palace (GB); 1956	Queen of Light	Borealis
Dam Glass Slipper (GB) 1969	Crystal Palace (GB); 1956	Queen of Light	Picture Play (Family:1-s)
