= Reg Hollinshead =

British racehorse trainer (1924-2013)

Reginald Hollinshead (3 January 1924 – 6 May 2013) was a British racehorse trainer and National Hunt jockey. His career in horse racing spanned more than six decades, during which he trained almost 2,000 winners in both Flat racing and National Hunt racing. At the time of his death, he was the oldest licensed racehorse trainer in the United Kingdom.

== Early life ==
Hollinshead was born in Upper Longdon, Staffordshire. Following the death of his father, Richard Hollinshead, in 1940, he took over the family farm at the age of 16. Although farming exempted him from military service, he served in the local Home Guard.

== Career ==
Hollinshead began horse racing as an amateur jockey and point-to-point rider. He received a trainer's permit in 1948 and trained his first winner, Shivalee, in 1949.

In 1978, he trained Remainder Man to finish second in the 2000 Guineas and third in the Derby. Later in his career, he trained Tominator, which won the Northumberland Plate at Newcastle in 2011 and a Listed race at Chester the following season.

He initially combined riding and training, achieving 88 wins as a jockey before focusing solely on training. Hollinshead trained both flat racing and jump racing horses at Lodge Farm in Upper Longdon. Among his horses, Suluk won 25 races between 1989 and 1993.

Hollinshead continued training into his late eighties and received the Sir Peter O’Sullevan Award in 2009.

== Notable horses ==
- Colonise – 1957 Cheltenham Festival winner
- Afzal – 1984 Liverpool Hurdle winner
- Out of the Gloom – 1985 Fighting Fifth & 1986 Long Walk Hurdle winner
- Bluff Cove – 1987 Long Walk Hurdle winner
- Remainder Man – Classic-placed in 1978, Ormonde Stakes winner
- The Quiet Bidder – 1981 Cork and Orrery Stakes winner
- Spanish Gold – 1972 Great St. Wilfrid Handicap winner
- Regal Steel – 1983 Old Newton Cup winner
- Royal Cavalier – 2001 November Handicap winner
- Tominator – 2011 Northumberland Plate winner
- Suluk – 1989-1993 25 wins

== Personal life ==
Hollinshead was married to Christine Hollinshead and had three children: Andrew, Tim, and Sarah. His son, Andrew, succeeded him as head trainer at Lodge Farm, working alongside his sister Sarah. Hollinshead died on 6 May 2013 in Burton-on-Trent, at the age of 89.

== Legacy ==
Hollinshead trained several jockeys who later became prominent in British racing, including Walter Swinburn, Willie Ryan, Kevin Darley, Jamie Spencer, and William Buick. Following his death, The Scotsman described him as "a gentleman of the turf" and "a key figure in British racing."

He also recorded wins in several major Flat racing handicaps, including the Great St. Wilfrid Stakes with Spanish Gold in 1972, the Free Handicap with Remainder Man in 1978, and the November Handicap with Royal Cavalier in 2001.
