= Ripon Racecourse =

Racecourse in North Yorkshire, England

Coordinates: 54°07′24.38″N 1°29′53.73″W

Ripon
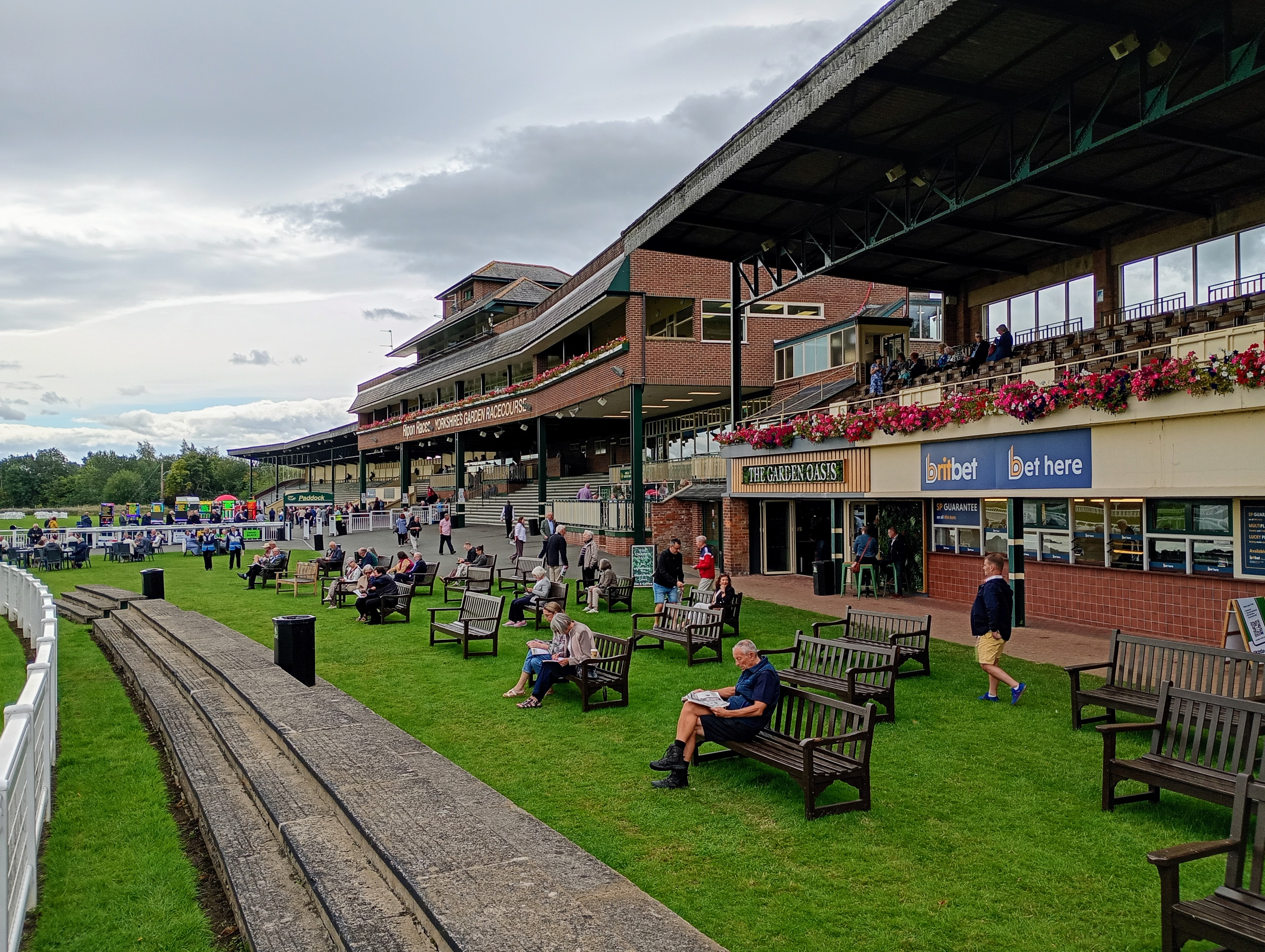
- The stands from the north
- Interactive map of Ripon
- Location: Ripon, North Yorkshire
- Owned by: The Ripon Race Company Ltd.
- Date opened: 6 August 1900
- Screened on: Sky Sports Racing
- Course type: Flat
- Notable races: Great St. Wilfrid Stakes; Ripon Champion Two Years Old Trophy

Ripon Racecourse is a thoroughbred horse racing venue located in Ripon, North Yorkshire, England. It is nicknamed the Garden Racecourse being known for its lawns, trees and flowerbeds, with it having been said that there's 'no more attractive paddock in the country'. It has a circumference of one mile and five furlongs and is in a city where racing has taken place in some form since 1664. The current site opened in 1900 and plays host to some significant race meetings, whilst also being adjacent to a nature reserve.

It is hosting sixteen fixtures in 2026, including the Great St Wilfrid Handicap and Ripon Champion Two Years Old Trophy.

== History ==
Ripon's recorded connections to horse racing begin with the cathedral city being the site of one of Henry VIII's studs.

Racing has taken place at a number of locations in Ripon from as far back as 1664 when the first meeting took place on Bondgate Green, although by 1675 meetings had moved to Monckton Moor. In 1713, a meeting was held to discuss moving racing to the High Common, where racing would remain until the common was enclosed in 1826.

In 1721, John Aislabie of nearby Studley Royal gave £45 to be run for, his second wife Judith (née Vernon) donating donating £12 worth of plate. Racing in the town first gained national attention in 1723 when the city hosted Britain's first horse race exclusively for female jockeys. Lady Judith Aislabie would sponsor and win the race, which saw nine female jockeys ride wearing drawers, waistcoats and jockey caps.

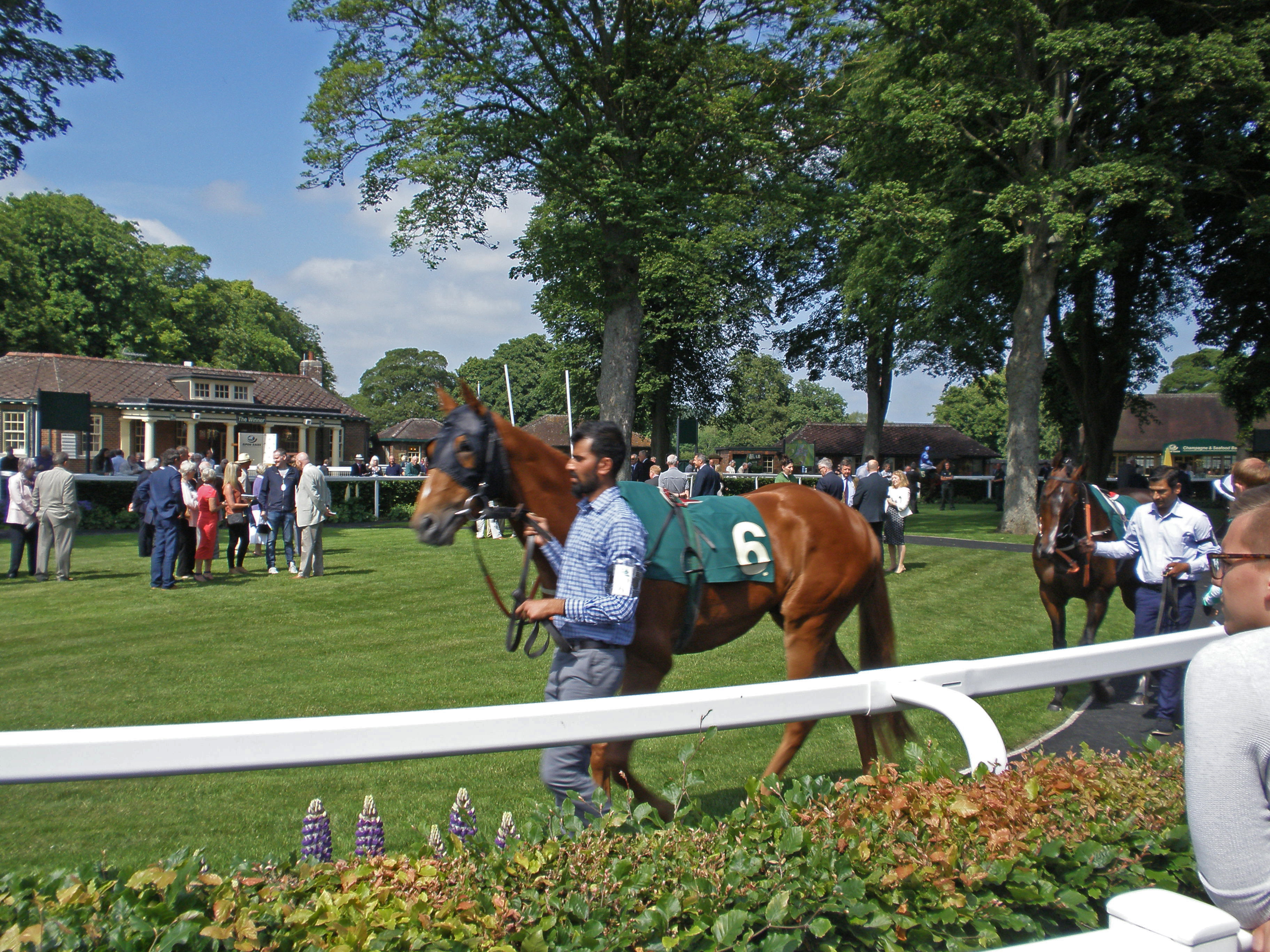
The parade ring

After the enclosure of the common in 1826, racing ceased. However, interest in racing in Ripon was revived through a modest meeting held by a local publican named Haygarth on his own land. In 1837, a new course north of the River Ure opened, largely to provide entertainment for the feast of St Wilfrid, the patron saint of Ripon. An 1856 OS map shows this racecourse, beside the road to Thirsk and adjacent to the railway station. Racing moved yet again in 1865, this time to be off Whitcliffe Road at Redbank, to the west of Ripon town centre. The Ripon Races Company was formed in 1879 but racing on the present site on Boroughbridge Road wouldn't begin until 6 August 1900.

Between 1916 and 1919, the southern half of the racecourse was used as a base for No. 76 Squadron of the Royal Flying Corps (later the Royal Air Force) as RFC/RAF Ripon. The ground was also used sporadically for civilian aircraft into the 1920s.

It was voted the 'Best Small Racecourse in the North' by the Racegoers' Club in 2011, 2014 and 2015. It was also used in the filming of an episode of the revival of the TV series All Creatures Great and Small, in which Siegfried Farnon attempts to become the Darrowby Racecourse vet and attends to an injured horse.

== Nature ==
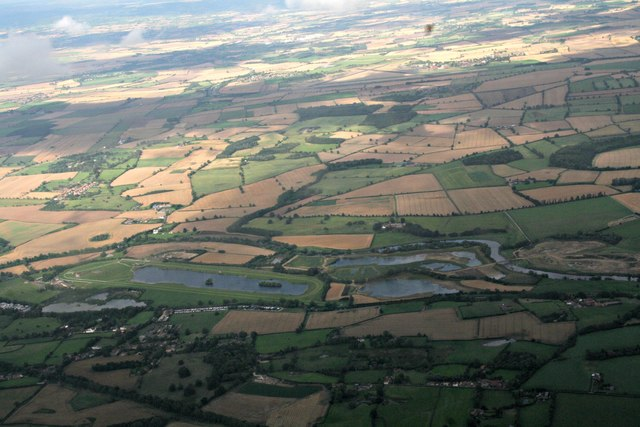
The racecourse (bottom left) and wetlands from the air

In the centre of the racecourse is a 22-acre lake, which is stocked with over 250 carp and is popular for fishing and other water pursuits.

The Yorkshire Wildlife Trust's Ripon City Wetlands nature reserve is adjacent to the racecourse in a former quarry, with it being possible to see bitterns, avocets, little ringed plovers, kingfishers, otters and other species there.

== Course characteristics ==
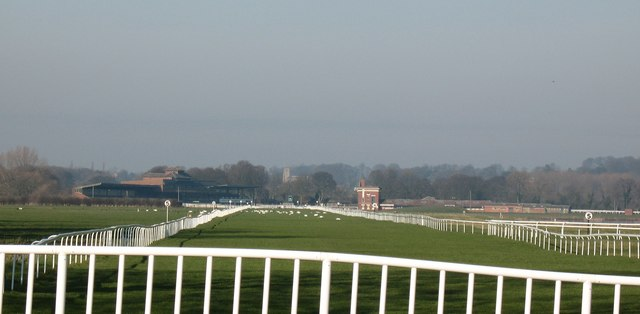
The enclosures viewed from the end of the undulating six-furlong straight

The course is a right-handed oval of one mile and five furlongs with a sharp bend preceding the five-furlong run-in. There is a chute which creates a six furlong straight course. The cramped bends and undulations in the straight make the course very sharp, making it a track beneficial to front-runners.

The course has three enclosures, which are the Club Stand (the most expensive encolure), Paddock Enclosure and Course Enclosure in the centre of the track. Ripon also boasts a permanent giant screen.

== Facts and figures ==
- Number of fixtures (2026): 16
- Top trainer (2021-2025 inc.): Tim Easterby, 55 wins from 485 runs (11% strike rate)

== Notable races ==
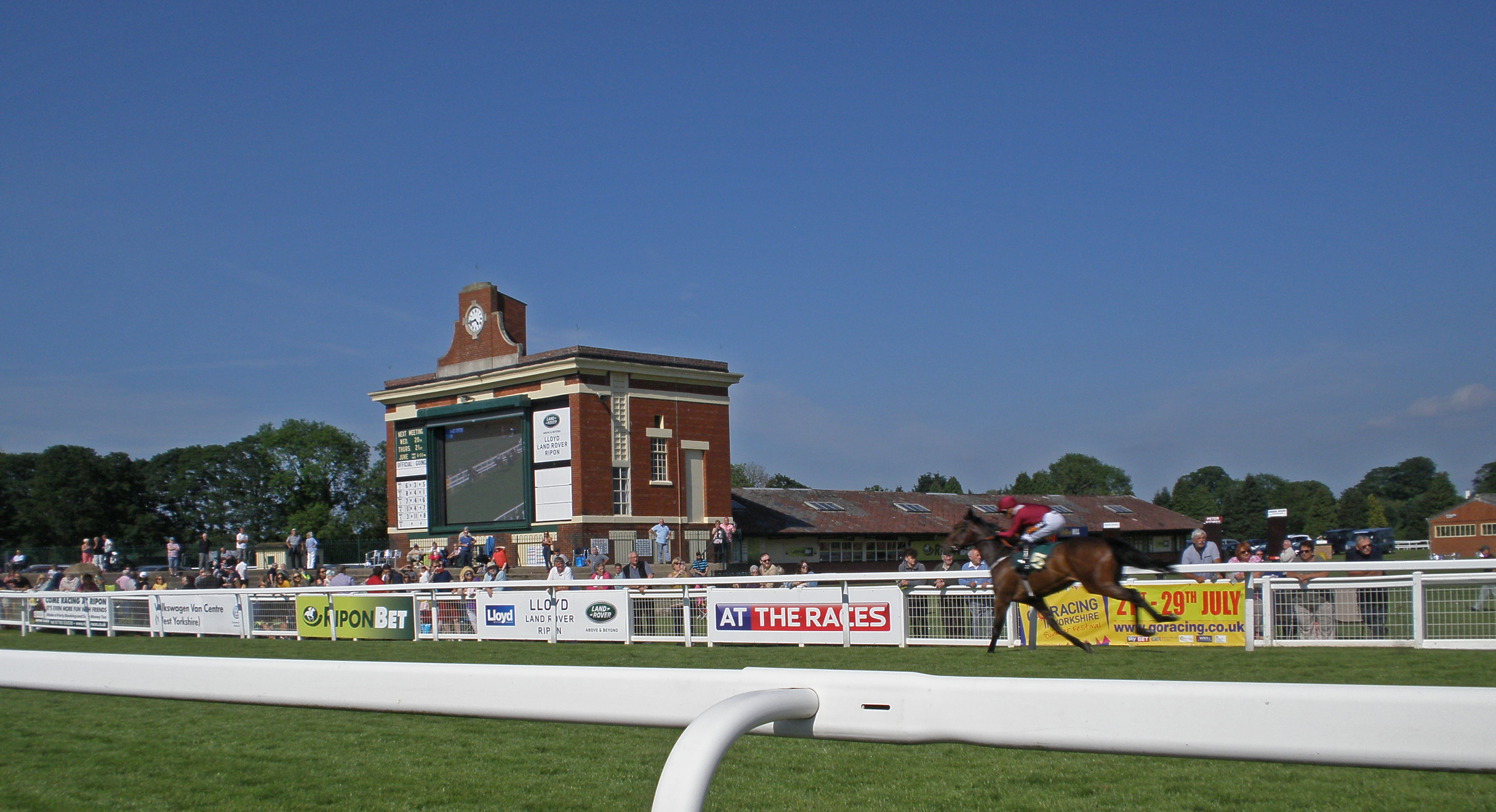
The course enclosure viewed from across the track

The most prestigious race in Ripon's calendar is the Great St Wilfrid Handicap, run over six furlongs and named in honour of Ripon's patron saint Wilfrid. Significant past winners have included Pipalong in 1999 and Markab in 2009. The likeable Dakota Gold won the 2019 running and was still winning at Ripon in 2025, taking the Armstrong Memorial Handicap in April that year. The other particularly significant race is the Ripon Champion Two Years Old Trophy, which takes place on the August Bank Holiday Monday, with Invincible Spirit among its winners, having taken the 1999 edition.

Racing history was also made in a match race at Ripon in 2023, when Doom became the joint shortest-priced loser in British racing history. The horse was defeated at a starting price of 1/25 in a maiden, beaten by Karmology. The record stood until 2026, when Najidi Storm lost at 1/33 at Goodwood.

Month	DOW	Race Name	Type	Grade	Distance	Age/Sex
August	Saturday	Great St. Wilfrid Stakes	Flat	Handicap	6f	3yo +
August	Monday	Ripon Champion Two Years Old Trophy	Flat	Listed	6f	2yo

== Bibliography ==
- Delve, Ken (2006). Northern England : Co. Durham, Cumbria, Isle of Man, Lancashire, Merseyside, Manchester, Northumberland, Tyne & Wear, Yorkshire. Ramsbury: Crowood. ISBN 1-86126-809-2.
- Gill, James (1975). Racecourses of Great Britain. London: Barrie & Jenkins. ISBN 0-2142-0090-6.
- Mortimer, Roger; Onslow, Richard; Willett, Peter (1978). Biographical Encyclopaedia of British Flat Racing. London: Macdonald and Jane's. ISBN 0-354-08536-0.
