= Desert Prince =

Irish-bred Thoroughbred racehorse

- Sire: Green Desert
- Grandsire: Danzig
- Dam: Flying Fairy
- Damsire: Bustino
- Sex: Stallion
- Foaled: 14 March 1995
- Country: United Kingdom
- Colour: Chestnut
- Breeder: Tarworth Bloodstock Investments
- Owner: Lucayan Stud
- Trainer: David Loder
- Record: 11:5-2-1
- Earnings: £495,005

Major wins
- European Free Handicap (1998); Irish 2,000 Guineas (1998); Prix du Moulin (1998); Queen Elizabeth II Stakes (1998)

Awards
- Top-rated European three-year-old colt (1998); Timeform rating:130

Desert Prince (14 March 1995 – 25 October 2022) was an Irish-bred, British-trained Thoroughbred racehorse and sire. After winning one of his four starts as a two-year-old in 1997, he improved to become one of the best milers and the highest-rated horse of his generation in Europe in the following year. He won the European Free Handicap in April before winning three Group One races in three countries: the Irish 2,000 Guineas in Ireland, the Prix du Moulin in France and the Queen Elizabeth II Stakes in the United Kingdom. After a disappointing run in the Breeders' Cup Turf he was retired to stud and has had some success as a sire of winners.

== Background ==
Desert Prince was a bay horse with white socks on his hind feet bred in Ireland by Tarworth Bloodstock, a breeding company owned by the Jersey-based businessman Peter Pritchard. He was sired by Green Desert, a horse who finished second to Dancing Brave in the 1986 2000 Guineas before winning the July Cup and the Haydock Sprint Cup. At stud, his other winners included Oasis Dream, Sheikh Albadou and Cape Cross. Desert Prince's dam, Flying Fairy, failed to win a race but came from a good family, being a daughter of the 1000 Guineas winner Fairy Footsteps.

In October 1996, the yearling colt was sent from Pritchard's Genesis Green Stud to the Tattersalls sale at Newmarket, Suffolk, where he was bought for 62,000 guineas by the bloodstock agent Charlie Gordon-Watson acting on behalf of Edward St Georges's Lucayan Stud. Gordon-Watson later recalled: "At the sales, Desert Prince stood out because he was just a great athletic horse. He had a good pedigree with Fairy Footsteps and Light Cavalry in there on the dam's side. On pedigree, I thought he had a chance of producing the goods. David Loder and I knew Desert Prince was going to make more than St George was prepared to pay. We managed to track him down in London, where he was having lunch. We told him the horse was definitely worth having. He gave us the OK and he's the most expensive horse St George has ever bought". The colt was sent into training with Loder at Nemarket.

== Racing career ==
=== 1997: two-year-old season ===
Desert Prince began his racing career in a six furlong maiden race at Doncaster Racecourse on 24 May. Ridden by Kevin Darley he started the 2/5 favourite in a thirteen-runner field and took the lead in the closing stages to win by half a length from Hayil, a colt who went on to win the Group One Middle Park Stakes that October. In June the colt was moved up in class for the Group Two Coventry Stakes at Royal Ascot in which he was ridden for the first time by Olivier Peslier. Starting the 3/1 favourite he was among the leaders from the start but was beaten one and a half lengths by the Aidan O'Brien-trained Harbour Master.

Kieren Fallon became the third jockey to ride Desert Prince when the colt was sent to France to contest the Group One Prix Morny over 1200 metres at Deauville Racecourse on 24 August. Racing against some of the best French juveniles, he finished fifth behind Chargé d'Affaires, Xaar, Heeremandi and Khumba Mela. The colt returned to England for his final appearance of the season in the Group One Dewhurst Stakes at Newmarket Racecourse on 18 October. Ridden by Frankie Dettori he started a 14/1 outsider and finished fourth, proving no match for Xaar, who won impressively by seven lengths.

=== 1998: three-year-old season ===
Desert Prince began his second season in the European Free Handicap at Newmarket on 15 April in which he carried a weight of 131 pounds and started at odds of 7/1. Ridden by Peslier, he took the lead inside the final furlong and won by one and a quarter lengths from Trans Island. Sylvain Guillot took the ride when the colt was sent to France for the Group One Poule d'Essai des Poulains at Longchamp Racecourse on 10 May. He raced in second place for much of the race, but was unable to quicken in the straight and finished third behind Victory Note and Muhtathir. Two weeks later Desert Prince was sent to Ireland to contest the Irish 2000 Guineas oer one mile at the Curragh. Ridden as in all his subsequent races by Peslier he started at 8/1 in a field of seven runners, with the O'Brien-trained Second Empire, the winner of the Grand Critérium being made the 4/5 favourite. After racing in second place behind the outsider Untold Story, Desert Prince took the lead two furlongs out and kept on well to win by three lengths from the Godolphin runner Fa-Eq. Desert Prince ran at Royal Ascot for the second time when he ran in the St James's Palace Stakes and started 4/1 second favourite against seven other three-year-old colts including Victory Note, Fa-Eq and the Henry Cecil-trained Dr Fong. In a change of tactics, Desert Prince took the lead from the start and had many of his rivals struggling early in the straight, but was caught in the final strides and beaten a neck by Dr Fong after what The Independent described as "a stirring battle".

After a break of more than two and a half months, Desert Prince returned in the Group One Prix du Moulin at Longchamp on 6 September in which he was matched against older horses for the first time. In a race run on very soft ground he started at odds of 4.1/1 in a field of seven runners which included Second Empire, Zalaiyka (winner of the Poule d'Essai des Pouliches) and the Japanese trained Seeking the Pearl who had won the Prix Maurice de Gheest in August. Desert Prince raced in third place behind the Japanese colt before taking the lead 400 metres from the finish. He went clear in the closing stages to win by three lengths from the outsider Gold Away with second Empire two lengths further back in third. Loder said after the race "I knew he'd come on something like 10lb since Ascot and it just remained for him to confirm my opinion on the racecourse. The colt had pleased me in his work and physically throughout the summer. It was always the intention to give Desert Prince a break after the St James's Palace and aim him at the Moulin. He goes on all ground and is a top-class colt. The plan now is to run him in the Queen Elizabeth II Stakes and then the Breeders' Cup Mile, before he retires to the Irish National Stud". Peslier commented: "Desert Prince would have been more impressive on better ground. I gave him time to build up momentum and he gave me a big effort".

Three weeks later, Desert Prince started the 100/30 favourite for the Group One Queen Elizabeth II Stakes at Ascot. The race saw him pitted for the second time against Dr Fong, with the other runners including Second Empire, Cape Cross and the Sussex Stakes winner Among Men. Peslier tracked the leaders before ending the colt into the lead two furlong from the finish. He held off a challenge from Dr Fong to prevail by half a length with a gap of three and a half lengths back to Second Empire in third. After the race, Loder said of the horse that "ever since he arrived in the yard he has had a presence or an aura around him. Last year I thought he was the best horse I have trained and he has come good". On his final racecourse of the season he was sent to the United States to contest the Breeders' Cup Mile at Churchill Downs on 7 November. Loder explained that while the colt's victory at Ascot was "the icing on the cake", the Breeders' Cup would be "the cherry on the top". He started 3/1 second favourite behind Favorite Trick, but after being hampered in the early stages he was never in contention and finished last of the fourteen runners behind Da Hoss.

In the International Classification, published in January 1999, Desert Prince was rated the best European three-year-old colt of 1998, one pound ahead of Dr Fong.

== Stud record ==
Desert Prince was retired from racing to become a breeding stallion in 1999–2006 at the Irish National Stud in County Kildare at a fee of €20000 and shuttled in 1999–2004 to Woodlands Stud Australia for the Southern Hemisphere breeding season. At stud in 2007–11 at the Gestut Isarland Germany. At stud in 2012–13 and 2015–20 at Scuderia Andy Capp Italy. in 2014 stand at the Haras du Thenney near Saint-Pierre-Azif in Calvados France. Pensioned in 2020 and died on 25 October 2022. His best winners have included Oriental Magic (Scottish Derby), Tarzi (Hyperion Stakes), Outback Prince (TJ Smith Stakes), France (Tetrarch Stakes), Mail The Desert and the leading hurdler My Tent Or Yours.

== Pedigree ==
Pedigree of Desert Prince (IRE), bay stallion, 1995
Sire Green Desert (USA) 1983	Danzig (USA); 1977	Northern Dancer	Nearctic
Sire Green Desert (USA) 1983	Danzig (USA); 1977	Northern Dancer	Natalma
Sire Green Desert (USA) 1983	Danzig (USA); 1977	Pas de Nom	Admirals Voyage
Sire Green Desert (USA) 1983	Danzig (USA); 1977	Pas de Nom	Petitioner
Sire Green Desert (USA) 1983	Foreign Courier (USA); 1979	Sir Ivor	Sir Gaylord
Sire Green Desert (USA) 1983	Foreign Courier (USA); 1979	Sir Ivor	Attica
Sire Green Desert (USA) 1983	Foreign Courier (USA); 1979	Courtly Dee	Never Bend
Sire Green Desert (USA) 1983	Foreign Courier (USA); 1979	Courtly Dee	Tulle
Dam Flying Fairy (GB) 1983	Bustino (GB); 1971	Busted	Crepello
Dam Flying Fairy (GB) 1983	Bustino (GB); 1971	Busted	Sans Le Sou
Dam Flying Fairy (GB) 1983	Bustino (GB); 1971	Ship Yard	Doutelle
Dam Flying Fairy (GB) 1983	Bustino (GB); 1971	Ship Yard	Paving Stone
Dam Flying Fairy (GB) 1983	Fairy Footsteps (IRE); 1978	Mill Reef	Never Bend
Dam Flying Fairy (GB) 1983	Fairy Footsteps (IRE); 1978	Mill Reef	Milan Mill
Dam Flying Fairy (GB) 1983	Fairy Footsteps (IRE); 1978	Glass Slipper	Relko
Dam Flying Fairy (GB) 1983	Fairy Footsteps (IRE); 1978	Glass Slipper	Crystal Palace (Family:1-s)
