= 1979 Epsom Derby =

- Derby
- Location: Epsom Downs Racecourse
- Date: 6 June 1979
- Winning horse: Troy
- Starting price: 6/1
- Jockey: Willie Carson
- Trainer: Dick Hern
- Owner: Sir Michael Sobell & Lord Weinstock
- Conditions: Good

Epsom Derby 1979
1-2-3
Troy	Dickens Hill	Northern Baby

Also Ran
4-5-6
Man of Vision	Cracaval	Niniski
7-8-9
Milford	Noelino	Tap On Wood
10-11-12
Son of Love	Two of Diamonds	Accomplice
13-14-15
Saracen Prince	New Berry	Morvetta
16-17-18
Lyphard's Wish	Leodegrance	Laska Floko
19-20-21
Lake City	Hardgreen	Halyudh
Ela-Mana-Mou	Chetinkaya	23 Ran

The 1979 Epsom Derby was the 200th annual running of the Derby horse race. It took place at Epsom Downs Racecourse on 6 June 1979. With a prize of £153,980 to the winner, the race value was a significant increase on the £98,410 offered the previous year and a record for a race contested in Europe

The winter ante-post market was headed by Tromos who was followed by More Light, Gregorian, Sandy Creek and Troy. However, only the latter named would line up at Epsom. Dewhurst Stakes winner Tromos picked up a virus after finishing runner up in the Craven Stakes, More Light was decisively beaten in both the Heath Stakes and the Dante Stakes, Gregorian was unraced again after beaten 8¾ lengths in the Ballymoss Stakes while Sandy Creek never returned to the racecourse after his juvenile season. On the day of the race, the market was headed by Guy Harwood's Ela-Mana-Mou who had supplemented his juvenile success in the Royal Lodge Stakes by winning the Heath Stakes by four lengths. Next in the market was Troy who had won four of his previous five starts including the Vintage Stakes, Sandown Classic Trial and Predominate Stakes. One of three representatives for Dick Hern, who had been attempting to win the race for twenty years, he was the chosen mount of Willie Carson. Milford and Tap On Wood were the remaining horses in the single digit price range with the former winning his trials at Ascot and Sandown by a combined fifteen lengths, and the latter a surprise 20/1 winner of the 2000 Guineas.

The pace was set by Henry Cecil's Lyphard's Wish and his lead lasted until a furlong and a half from home when passed by the Irish trained Dickens Hill.Dickens Hill's lead would not last long however as Troy, who had struggled for pace early on and was only in thirteenth place at Tattenham Corner, stormed past for an emphatic victory. The winning margin of seven lengths was the widest recorded since Manna in 1925. The race was in danger of being marred as a toilet roll was thrown at the runners by a spectator at Tattenham Corner. Yves Saint-Martin, riding Vincent O'Brien's Accomplice, passed the finishing with the paper still attached to his head although he stated that the incident did not cost him the race.

== Race details ==
- Sponsor: none
- Winner's prize money: £153,980
- Going: Good
- Number of runners: 23
- Winner's time: 2 minutes, 36.59 seconds

== Full result ==
	Dist *	Horse	Jockey	Trainer	SP
1		Troy	Willie Carson	Dick Hern	6-1
2	7	Dickens Hill	Tony Murray	Mick O'Toole	15-1
3	3	Northern Baby	Philippe Paquet	François Boutin	66-1
4	¾	Ela-Mana-Mou	Greville Starkey	Guy Harwood	9-2f
5	2	Lyphard's Wish	Joe Mercer	Henry Cecil	11-1
6	shd	Hardgreen	Paul Cook	Michael Stoute	25-1
7	hd	Man Of Vision	Bruce Raymond	Michael Jarvis	33-1
8		Cracaval	Bill Shoemaker	Barry Hills	22-1
9		Niniski	John Reid	Dick Hern	80-1
10		Milford	Lester Piggott	Dick Hern	15-2
11		Noelino	Christy Roche	Paddy Prendergast	12-1
12		Tap On Wood	Steve Cauthen	Barry Hills	15-2
13		Morvetta	Geoff Baxter	Denys Smith	500-1
14		Two Of Diamonds	Ernie Johnson	Barry Hills	25-1
15		Son Of Love	Alain Lequeux	Robert Collet	200-1
16		Lake City	Brian Taylor	Ryan Price	50-1
17		New Berry	Pat Eddery	Peter Walwyn	25-1
18		Chetinkaya	Brian Rouse	Philip Mitchell	500-1
19		Accomplice	Yves Saint-Martin	Vincent O'Brien	50-1
20		Leodegrance	Philip Waldron	Toby Balding	500-1
21		Halyudh	Geoff Lewis	Scobie Breasley	200-1
22		Laska Floko	Edward Hide	Clive Brittain	40-1
Ref		Saracen Prince	Kipper Lynch	Paul Kelleway	500-1

== Winner details ==
Further details of the winner, Troy:

- Foaled: 25 March 1976, in Ireland
- Sire: Petingo; Dam: La Milo (Hornbeam)
- Owner: Sir Michael Sobell & Lord Weinstock
- Breeder: Ballymacoll Stud

== Form analysis ==
=== Two-year-old races ===
Notable runs by the future Derby participants as two-year-olds in 1978:

- Accomplice - 1st Ashford Castle Stakes, Beresford Stakes
- Dickens Hill - 1st Anglesey Stakes, 2nd National Stakes
- Ela-Mana-Mou - 2nd Vintage Stakes, 1st Royal Lodge Stakes
- Hardgreen - 3rd Mill Reef Stakes, 2nd Horris Hill Stakes
- Lake City - 1st Coventry Stakes
- Laska Floko - 4th Futurity Stakes
- Lyphard's Wish - 1st Solario Stakes, 3rd Royal Lodge Stakes, 3rd Futurity Stakes
- Man Of Vision - 2nd Acomb Stakes
- Milford - 2nd Houghton Stakes, 2nd Clarence House Stakes
- Saracen Prince - 3rd Vintage Stakes
- Son Of Love - 1st Prix Isonomy
- Tap On Wood - 1st National Stakes
- Troy - 1st Vintage Stakes, 2nd Royal Lodge Stakes

=== The road to Epsom ===
Early-season appearances in 1979 and trial races prior to running in the Derby:

- Cracaval - 1st - Chester Vase
- Dickens Hill - 2nd Vauxhall Trial Stakes, 1st Ballymoss -Stakes, 1st Irish 2000 Guineas
- Ela-Mana-Mou - 1st Heath Stakes
- Halyudh - 2nd Lingfield Derby Trial
- Hardgreen - 2nd Dante Stakes
- Lake City - 1st 2,000 Guineas Trial Stakes, 3rd Dante Stakes
- Laska Floko - 5th Dante Stakes
- Lyphard's Wish - 1st Craven Stakes, 5th 2000 Guineas, 1st Dante Stakes
- Man Of Vision - 1st Easter Stakes, 4th Prix Lupin
- Milford - 1st White Rose Stakes, 1st Lingfield Derby Trial
- Niniski - 2nd Glasgow Stakes
- Noelino - 1st Nijinsky Stakes
- Northern Baby - 2nd Prix de Suresnes, 2nd Prix La Force
- Son Of Love - 2nd Prix Noailles
- Tap On Wood - 1st 2000 Guineas Stakes
- Two Of Diamonds - 2nd Sandown Classic Trial, 1st Dee Stakes
- Troy – 1st Sandown Classic Trial, 1st Predominate Stakes

=== Subsequent Group 1 wins ===
Group 1 / Grade I victories after running in the Derby.

- Dickens Hill - Eclipse Stakes (1979)
- Ela-Mana-Mou - Eclipse Stakes (1980), King George VI and Queen Elizabeth Stakes (1980)
- Lyphard's Wish - United Nations Handicap (1980)
- Niniski - Irish St. Leger (1979), Prix Royal-Oak (1979)
- Northern Baby - Champion Stakes (1979)
- Son Of Love - St Leger Stakes (1979)
- Troy – Irish Derby (1979), King George VI and Queen Elizabeth Stakes (1979),Benson and Hedges Gold Cup (1979)

== Subsequent breeding careers ==
Leading progeny of participants in the 1979 Epsom Derby.

=== Sires of Classic winners ===
Niniski (9th)

- Minster Son - 1st St Leger Stakes (1988)
- Assessor - 1st Prix Royal-Oak (1992)
- Hernando - 1st Prix du Jockey Club (1993)
- Alflora - 1st Queen Anne Stakes (1993)

Troy (1st)

- Helen Street - 1st Irish Oaks (1985) Dam of Street Cry
- Walensee - 1st Prix Vermeille (1985) Dam of Westerner
- Cocotte - 2nd Prix de Psyché (1986) Dam of Pilsudski and Fine Motion
- Sheer Audacity - Dam of Oath (1st Epsom Derby 1999)

Northern Baby (3rd)

- Michelozzo - 1st St Leger Stakes (1989)
- Possibly Perfect - American Champion Female Turf Horse (1995)
- Baby Turk - 1st Grand Prix de Deauville (1986) - Sire of Azertyuiop
- Warm Spell - American Champion Steeplechase Horse (1989)

Ela-Mana-Mou (4th)

- Eurobird - 1st Irish St. Leger (1987)
- Snurge - 1st St Leger Stakes (1990)
- Double Trigger - 1st Ascot Gold Cup (1995)
- Fair of the Furze - 1st Rogers Gold Cup (1986) - Dam of White Muzzle

=== Sires of Group/Grade One winners ===
Lyphard's Wish (5th)

- Derby Wish - 1st Secretariat Stakes (1985)
- Art Francais - 3rd Poule d'Essai des Poulains (1986)
- Vertige - 2nd Prix Jacques le Marois (1985)
- Villez - 1st Prix Cambacérès (1995)

=== Sires of National Hunt horses ===
Dickens Hill (2nd)

- Victorian Hill - 1st Iroquois Steeplechase (1991, 1992)

=== Other Stallions ===
Tap On Wood (12th) - Royal Touch (2nd Prix de la Forêt 1989), Miss Boniface (3rd Prix de la Salamandre 1987)
Milford (10th) - Cunizza da Romano (2nd Oaks d'Italia 1987), Luck Mugen (3rd Oka Sho 1992) - Exported to Japan
Halyudh (21st) - Mr Boston (2nd Midlands Grand National 1992)
Hardgreen (6th) - Minor flat and jumps winners
Man Of Vision (7th) - Exported to Japan
Lake City (17th) - Exported to Venezuela
Laska Floko (22nd) - Exported to South Africa
