= 1979 in sports =

1979 in sports describes the year's events in world sport.

== Alpine skiing ==
- Alpine Skiing World Cup
  - Men's overall season champion: Peter Lüscher, Switzerland
  - Women's overall season champion: Annemarie Moser-Pröll, Austria

== American football ==
- Super Bowl XIII – the Pittsburgh Steelers (AFC) won 35−31 over the Dallas Cowboys (NFC)
  - Location: Miami Orange Bowl
  - Attendance: 79,484
  - MVP: Terry Bradshaw, QB (Pittsburgh)
- Sugar Bowl (1978 season):
  - The Alabama Crimson Tide won 14–7 over the Penn State Nittany Lions to claim AP Poll national championship
- August 4 – Opening game of the American Football Bundesliga played between Frankfurter Löwen and Düsseldorf Panther, first-ever league game of American football in Germany.
- November 10 – German Bowl I – Frankfurter Löwen defeated the Ansbach Grizzlies 14–8.

== Artistic gymnastics ==
- World Artistic Gymnastics Championships –
  - Men's all-around champion: Alexander Dityatin, USSR
  - Women's all-around champion: Nellie Kim, USSR
  - Men's team competition champion: USSR
  - Women's team competition champion: Romania

== Association football ==
- May 12 – England – FA Cup – Arsenal win 3–2 over Manchester United
- Sport Club Internacional win the Brazilian Championship undefeated

== Australian rules football ==
- Victorian Football League
  - April 28: Collingwood beats a 70-year-old record for the greatest winning margin in VFL football when they beat St. Kilda by 178 points 31.21 (207) to 3.11 (29)
  - July 28: Fitzroy beats Collingwood's three-month-old record when they beat Melbourne 36.22 (238) to 6.12 (48) with Bob Beecroft kicking ten goals
  - Carlton win the 83rd VFL Premiership (Carlton 11.16 (82) d Collingwood 11.11 (77))
  - Brownlow Medal awarded to Peter Moore (Collingwood)

== Baseball ==
- January 23 – Willie Mays receives 409 of 432 votes in the BBWAA election to earn enshrinement in the Hall of Fame.
- July 12 – Disco Demolition Night at Comiskey Park between the Chicago White Sox and Detroit Tigers
- August 2 – death of Thurman Munson, New York Yankees catcher, in an air crash
- World Series – Pittsburgh Pirates won 4 games to 3 over the Baltimore Orioles. The Series MVP was Willie Stargell, Pittsburgh. The Pirates become the only team in sports history to come back from a three games to one deficit in a championship series twice, having also achieved the comeback in the 1925 World Series.

== Basketball ==
- NCAA Division I Men's Basketball Championship –
  - Michigan St. wins 75–64 over Indiana St.
- NBA Finals –
  - Seattle SuperSonics, coached by Lenny Wilkens, won 4 games to 1 over the Washington Bullets for the only finals win in Seattle SuperSonics history.
- National Basketball League (Australia) –
  - The Australian NBL was founded. The St Kilda Saints became the first champions by defeating the Canberra Cannons 94–93 in the final.

== Boxing ==
- September 28 in Las Vegas, Larry Holmes retains his World Heavyweight title with an 11th-round TKO of Earnie Shavers.
- November 30 in Las Vegas, dual world championship undercard: Vito Antuofermo retains his world Middleweight title with a 15-round draw (tie) against Marvin Hagler, and Sugar Ray Leonard wins his first world title, beating WBC world Welterweight champion Wilfred Benítez by knockout in round 15.

== Canadian football ==
- Grey Cup – Edmonton Eskimos win 17–9 over the Montreal Alouettes
- Vanier Cup – Acadia Axemen win 34–12 over the Western Ontario Mustangs

== Cricket ==
- Cricket World Cup – West Indies beat England by 92 runs
- World Series Cricket rival competition to official International Cricket Council matches is disbanded.

== Cycling ==
- Giro d'Italia – won by Giuseppe Saronni of Italy
- Tour de France – Bernard Hinault of France
- UCI Road World Championships – Men's road race – Jan Raas of Netherlands

== Dogsled racing ==
- Iditarod Trail Sled Dog Race Champion –
  - Rick Swenson won with lead dogs: Andy & O.B. (Old Buddy)

== Field hockey ==
- 1979 Pan American Games men's competition held in San Juan, Puerto Rico and won by Argentina
- August – The 2nd Women's World Field Hockey Championships are held at Vancouver, British Columbia, Canada with the Netherlands as the champions.

== Figure skating ==
- World Figure Skating Championships –
  - Men's champion: Vladimir Kovalev, Soviet Union
  - Ladies' champion: Linda Fratianne, United States
  - Pair skating champions: Tai Babilonia & Randy Gardner, United States
  - Ice dancing champions: Natalia Linichuk & Gennadi Karponossov, Soviet Union

== Golf ==
Men's professional

- Masters Tournament – Fuzzy Zoeller defeats Ed Sneed and Tom Watson in the second hole of a sudden-death playoff, the first time the Masters used a sudden-death format.
- U.S. Open – Hale Irwin
- British Open – Seve Ballesteros becomes the first golfer from Continental Europe to win a major since Arnaud Massy of France won this event in 1907.
- PGA Championship – David Graham
- PGA Tour money leader – Tom Watson – $462,636
- Ryder Cup – United States won 17–11 over Europe in the first Ryder Cup to feature a side representing all of Europe.

Men's amateur

- British Amateur – Jay Sigel
- U.S. Amateur – Mark O'Meara

Women's professional

- LPGA Championship – Donna Caponi
- U.S. Women's Open – Jerilyn Britz
- Classique Peter Jackson Classic – Amy Alcott
- LPGA Tour money leader – Nancy Lopez – $197,489

== Harness racing ==
- The Hambletonian is awarded to Meadowlands Racetrack, starting in 1981.
- United States Pacing Triple Crown races –
  1. Cane Pace – Happy Motoring
  2. Little Brown Jug – Hot Hitter
  3. Messenger Stakes – Hot Hitter
- United States Trotting Triple Crown races –
  1. Hambletonian – Legend Hanover
  2. Yonkers Trot – Mo Bandy
  3. Kentucky Futurity – Filet of Sole
- Australian Inter Dominion Harness Racing Championship –
  - Pacers: Rondel
  - Trotters: No Response

== Horse racing ==
Steeplechases

- Cheltenham Gold Cup – Alverton
- Grand National – Rubstic

Flat races

- Australia – Melbourne Cup won by Hyperno
- Canada – Queen's Plate won by Steady Growth
- France – Prix de l'Arc de Triomphe won by Three Troikas
- Ireland – Irish Derby Stakes won by Troy
- English Triple Crown Races:
  1. 2,000 Guineas Stakes – Tap On Wood
  2. The Derby – Troy
  3. St. Leger Stakes – Son of Love
- United States Triple Crown Races:
  1. Kentucky Derby – Spectacular Bid
  2. Preakness Stakes – Spectacular Bid
  3. Belmont Stakes – Coastal

== Ice hockey ==
- Art Ross Trophy as the NHL's leading scorer during the regular season: Bryan Trottier, New York Islanders
- Hart Memorial Trophy for the NHL's Most Valuable Player: Bryan Trottier, New York Islanders
- Stanley Cup – Montreal Canadiens win 4 games to 1 over the New York Rangers
- World Hockey Championship
  - Men's champion: Soviet Union defeated Czechoslovakia
  - Junior Men's champion: Soviet Union defeated Sweden
- Réal Cloutier of the Quebec Nordiques became the second NHL player to score a hat trick in his debut NHL game.
- Avco World Trophy – Winnipeg Jets won 4 games to 2 over the Edmonton Oilers

== Rugby league ==
- 1979 Great Britain Lions tour
- 1979 Amco Cup
- 1979 European Rugby League Championship
- 1979 New Zealand rugby league season
- 1978–79 Northern Rugby Football League season / 1979–80 Northern Rugby Football League season
- 1979 NSWRFL season

== Rugby union ==
- 85th Five Nations Championship series is won by Wales

== Snooker ==
- World Snooker Championship – outsider Terry Griffiths beats Dennis Taylor 24-16
- World rankings – Ray Reardon remains world number one for 1979/80

== Swimming ==
- Pan American Games in San Juan, Puerto Rico
- July 23 – West Germany's Klaus Steinbach sets a world record in the 50m freestyle at a swimming meet in Freiburg, shaving off 0.02 of the previous record (23.72) set by Ron Manganiello nearly a year ago: 23.70.

== Tennis ==
- Grand Slam in tennis men's results:
  1. Australian Open – Guillermo Vilas
  2. French Open – Björn Borg
  3. Wimbledon championships – July 7 – Björn Borg
  4. U.S. Open – John McEnroe
- Grand Slam in tennis women's results:
  1. Australian Open – Barbara Jordan
  2. French Open – Chris Evert
  3. Wimbledon championships – July 7 – Martina Navratilova
  4. U.S. Open – Tracy Austin, youngest US Open Champion at the age of 16 years, 8 months and 28 days defeating 4-time defending champion Chris Evert 6–4, 6–3 in the final after defeating 2nd seeded Martina Navratilova in the semifinal making Evert lose for the first time in 32 matches.
- Davis Cup – United States wins 5–0 over Italy in world tennis.

== Volleyball ==
- Asian Men's Volleyball Championship: won by China
- Asian Women's Volleyball Championship: won by China
- Men and Women's European Volleyball Championship held in France: both won by USSR
- Volleyball at the 1979 Pan American Games in San Juan, Puerto Rico: men's and women's tournaments both won by Cuba

== Water polo ==
- 1979 FINA Men's Water Polo World Cup held in Yugoslavia and won by Hungary
- 1979 FINA Women's Water Polo World Cup held in Merced, California and won by USA

== Multi-sport events ==
- 8th Pan American Games held in San Juan, Puerto Rico
- 8th Mediterranean Games held in Split, Yugoslavia
- Tenth Summer Universiade held in Mexico City, Mexico
- September 7 – The Entertainment and Sports Programming Network (ESPN) makes its debut.

== Awards ==
- Associated Press Male Athlete of the Year – Willie Stargell, Major League Baseball
- Associated Press Female Athlete of the Year – Tracy Austin, Tennis
- ABC's Wide World of Sports Athlete of the Year: Willie Stargell, Major League Baseball
