= 1979 Prix de l'Arc de Triomphe =

- Location: Longchamp Racecourse
- Date: October 7, 1979
- Winning horse: Three Troikas

The 1979 Prix de l'Arc de Triomphe was a horse race held at Longchamp on Sunday 7 October 1979. It was the 58th running of the Prix de l'Arc de Triomphe.

The winner was Three Troikas, a three-year-old filly trained in France by Criquette Head and ridden by her brother Freddy. The filly won by three lengths from Le Marmot with the odds-on favourite Troy in third. The winning time was 2:28.9.

== Race details ==
- Sponsor: none
- Purse:
- Going: Dead
- Distance: 2,400 metres
- Number of runners: 22
- Winner's time: 2:28.9

== Full result ==
Pos.	Marg.	Horse	Age	Jockey	Trainer (Country)
1		Three Troikas	3	Freddy Head	Criquette Head (FR)
2	3	Le Marmot	3	Philippe Paquet	François Boutin (FR)
3	1	Troy	3	Willie Carson	Dick Hern (GB)
4	nk	Pevero	4	Alain Lequeux	François Boutin (FR)
5	4	Trillion	5	Lester Piggott	Maurice Zilber (FR)
6	½	Northern Baby	3	Pat Eddery	François Boutin (FR)
7	2	Jeune Loup	4	Alain Badel	Olivier Douieb (FR)
8	8	Noble Saint	3	Joe Mercer	Robert Armstrong (GB)
9	2	Pawiment	5	Greville Starkey	Theo Grieper (GER)
10	5	Crimson Beau	4	Geoff Baxter	Paul Cole (GB)
11	nk	Pitasia	3	Alfred Gibert	Aage Paus (FR)
12	3	Two of Diamonds	3	Steve Cauthen	Barry Hills (GB)
13	nk	Valour	4	Paul Cook	Fulke Johnson Houghton (GB)
14	7	Ile de Bourbon	4	John Reid	Fulke Johnson Houghton (GB)
15	5	Fabulous Dancer	3	J Taillard	Criquette Head (FR)
16	shd	Noble Dancer	7	Jacinto Vásquez	T. J. Kelly (USA)
17	6	Top Ville	3	Yves Saint-Martin	François Mathet (FR)
18	¾	Telescopico	4	Sandy Hawley	Maurice Zilber (FR)
19	15	Kamaridaan	3	J Heloury	François Mathet (FR)
20		Player	3	Edward Hide
21		Princess Redowa	3	M Ouzouir	Aage Paus (FR)
22		Rivadon	3	Alan Bond	Dick Hern (GB)

* Abbreviations: ns = nose; shd = short-head; hd = head; snk = short neck; nk = neck

== Winner's details ==
Further details of the winner, Three Troikas.

- Sex: Filly
- Foaled: 25 January 1976
- Country: France
- Sire: Lyphard; Dam: Three Roses (Dual)
- Owner: Ghislaine Head
- Breeder: Artur Pfaff
