= Sandy Creek (horse) =

Irish-bred Thoroughbred racehorse

- Sire: Petingo
- Grandsire: Petition
- Dam: Keep Right
- Damsire: Klairon
- Sex: Stallion
- Foaled: 21 March 1976
- Country: Ireland
- Colour: Chestnut
- Breeder: O. Freaney
- Owner: Alfie McLean
- Trainer: Con Collins
- Record: 5: 2-1-1
- Earnings: Top-rated Irish two-year-old (1978)

Major wins
- Larkspur Stakes (1978); William Hill Futurity (1978)

Awards
- Timeform rating 123 (1978)

Sandy Creek (21 March 1976 – 24 March 1991) was an Irish Thoroughbred racehorse and sire. His racing career consisted of only five races between August and October 1978, but he was rated one of the best horses of his generation in Europe in that year. After finishing fifth in the Anglesey Stakes on his debut he finished a close, and somewhat unlucky third in the National Stakes before winning the Group Three Larkspur Stakes at Leopardstown Racecourse. Following a narrow defeat in the Beresford Stakes he was sent to England and ended his season by winning the Group One William Hill Futurity in a track record time. He never raced again and later stood as a breeding stallion in Europe and Japan. He had little success as a sire of winners.

== Background ==
Sandy Creek was a chestnut horse with a broad white blaze and white socks on his hind legs bred in Ireland by O Freaney. He was from the last full crop of foals sired by Petingo, the leading English two-year-old of 1967, a year in which he was rated the best horse of any age in Europe by the independent Timeform organisation. Petingo's other progeny included the English Prince, Fair Salinia and Troy. Sandy Creek's dam Keep Right never raced but was a daughter of Narrow Escape who won the Chesham Stakes and was a half-sister of the Timeform Gold Cup winner Pushful. Another of Narrow Escape's daughters, Quality of Life, was the grand-dam of the St Leger winner Bob's Return.

As a yearling, the colt was offered for sale and sold for 40,000 guineas and entered the ownership of the bookmaker Alfie McLean. He was sent into training with Con Collins (d. 2007) at The Curragh, County Kildare.

== Racing career ==
=== 1978: two-year-old season ===
Sandy Creek never contested a maiden race beginning his racing career by finishing fifth of the nine runners behind Dickens Hill in the Group Three Anglesey Stakes over six and a half furlongs at the Curragh in August. He then started a 33/1 outsider for the Group One National Stakes over the seven furlongs at the same track but belied his odds by finishing third to Tap On Wood and Dickens Hill, beaten a length after being slightly hampered by the winner in the closing stages. In the Group Three Larkspur Stakes at Leopardstown in September he started second favourite behind the British-trained Shack. He raced in second place behind Carelko before taking the lead a furlong from the finish and won by a length from Shack with Carelko in third. In the Beresford Stakes at the Curragh two weeks later he was matched against the Vincent O'Brien-trained Accomplice. He looked likely to win in the final furlong but was overhauled in the final strides and beaten a head by the 50/1 outsider Just A Game.

In late October Sandy Creek was sent to England to contest the Group One William Hill Futurity over one mile at Doncaster Racecourse. Ridden by Christy Roche he started at odds of 15/1 in a field of eleven runners. His main rivals appeared to be Lyphard's Wish (winner of the Solario Stakes), Warmington (third in the Dewhurst Stakes) and Bolide (runner-up in the Critérium de Maisons-Laffitte). Bolide took the lead from the start and set a very strong pace, whilst Sandy Creek was settled behind the leaders and turned into the straight in fourth place. Sandy Creek overtook Bolide a furlong and a half from the finish and held off several challengers to win by three quarters of a length from Warmington, with Lyphard's Wish, Laska Floko and Bolide close behind. The winning time of 1:38.32 was a track record for two-year-olds.

Sandy Creek stayed in training in 1979 but never ran again and was retired from racing at the end of the season. He was reportedly bought for £600,000 by John Magnier.

== Assessment ==
In the inaugural International Classification for two-year-olds, Sandy Creek was the highest-rated Irish-trained horse and the equal fourth-best juvenile in Europe behind Tromos, Irish River and Sigy. The independent Timeform organisation gave him a rating of 123, eleven pounds inferior to their best two-year-old Tromos.

== Stud record ==
At the end of his racing career Sandy Creek stood as a breeding stallion in Europe for two seasons before being exported to Japan. In nine seasons at stud in Japan he sired 56 winners from 137 registered foals the last of which were born in 1991. The best of his offspring was probably Lindo Hosho who won the Grade II Keio Hai Spring Cup and finished third in the Sprinters Stakes. Sandy Creek died on 24 March 1991.

== Pedigree ==
Pedigree of Sandy Creek (IRE), chestnut stallion, 1976
Sire Petingo (GB) 1965	Petition (GB); 1944	Fair Trial	Fairway
Sire Petingo (GB) 1965	Petition (GB); 1944	Fair Trial	Lady Juror
Sire Petingo (GB) 1965	Petition (GB); 1944	Art Paper	Artists Proof
Sire Petingo (GB) 1965	Petition (GB); 1944	Art Paper	Quire
Sire Petingo (GB) 1965	Alcazar (FR); 1957	Alycidon	Donatello
Sire Petingo (GB) 1965	Alcazar (FR); 1957	Alycidon	Aurora
Sire Petingo (GB) 1965	Alcazar (FR); 1957	Quarterdeck	Nearco
Sire Petingo (GB) 1965	Alcazar (FR); 1957	Quarterdeck	Poker Chip
Dam Keep Right (GB) 1969	Klairon (FR); 1952	Clarion	Djebel
Dam Keep Right (GB) 1969	Klairon (FR); 1952	Clarion	Columba
Dam Keep Right (GB) 1969	Klairon (FR); 1952	Kalmia	Kantar
Dam Keep Right (GB) 1969	Klairon (FR); 1952	Kalmia	Sweet Lavender
Dam Keep Right (GB) 1969	Narrow Escape (GB); 1960	Narrator	Nearco
Dam Keep Right (GB) 1969	Narrow Escape (GB); 1960	Narrator	Phase
Dam Keep Right (GB) 1969	Narrow Escape (GB); 1960	Press Forward	Precipitation
Dam Keep Right (GB) 1969	Narrow Escape (GB); 1960	Press Forward	Running Wild (Family: 1-w)
