= Dickens Hill =

Irish-bred Thoroughbred racehorse

- Sire: Mount Hagen
- Grandsire: Bold Bidder
- Dam: London Life
- Damsire: Panaslipper
- Sex: Stallion
- Foaled: 25 January 1976
- Country: Ireland
- Colour: Chestnut
- Breeder: Frank Flannery/ Egmont Stud
- Owner: Mme Jean-Pierre Binet; J & R Gaines
- Trainer: Mick O'Toole; H. Allen Jerkens
- Record: 14:5-4-3

Major wins
- Anglesey Stakes (1978); Ballymoss Stakes (1979); Irish 2000 Guineas (1979); Eclipse Stakes (1979)

Awards
- Top-rated Irish three-year-old (1979); Timeform rating 112 (1978), 130 (1979)

Dickens Hill (foaled 25 January 1976) was an Irish Thoroughbred racehorse and sire. The colt showed promising form as a two-year-old in 1978, winning the Anglesey Stakes and being narrowly beaten by the English-trained Tap On Wood in the National Stakes. In the following year he emerged as the best Irish racehorse of his generation, winning the Ballymoss Stakes and the Irish 2000 Guineas in Ireland in spring and the weight-for-age Eclipse Stakes in Britain in July. He also finished runner-up to the outstanding English-trained colt Troy in both The Derby and the Irish Derby. At the end of his three-year-old season he was sold and exported to the United States where he made little impact as a racehorse and proved to be a disappointment as a breeding stallion.

== Background ==
Dickens Hill was a chestnut horse with a white star and white socks on his hind legs bred by Frank Flannery's Egmont Stud in County Cork. He was from the first crop of foals sired by Mount Hagen, a horse owned and bred by Daniel Wildenstein, which won the Prix du Moulin in 1974. His dam London Life was a poor racehorse (rated 65 by Timeform) but a better broodmare, producing several other winners including Miralife, who finished third in the Irish 1000 Guineas and produced Miralla.

As a yearling, the colt was sent to the Houghton sale at Newmarket where he was bought for 34,000 guineas by representatives of Mme Jean-Pierre Binet. He was sent into training with Mick O'Toole, best known for his handling of National Hunt horses including the Cheltenham Gold Cup winner Davy Lad, and for his willingness to gamble heavily on his charges. The colt's name was originally rendered as Dickins Hill.

== Racing career ==
=== 1978: two-year-old season ===
After finishing third to Miami Springs and Gerald Martin on his racecourse debut in the Tyros Stakes, Dickins Hill recorded his first success by beating Cabinbinini by a length in a six furlong maiden race at the Curragh in July. In August, the colt was moved up in class for the Group Three Anglesey Stakes over the same course and distance. Before this race the spelling of the colt's name had been changed from Dickins Hill to Dickens Hill. Ridden by Wally Swinburn, he won by one and a half lengths from Card Game, with the rest of the field well beaten. In September, Dickens Hill started second favourite for the Group Two National Stakes at the Curragh. He was beaten a head by the English-trained Tap On Wood, although the result was only confirmed when the racecourse stewards overruled an objection by Swinburn, who alleged that the winner had caused interference in the final furlong. The beaten horses included Sandy Creek, who went on to win the William Hill Futurity. Dickens Hill face Tap On Wood again when he was sent to France and moved up to Group One Class for the Grand Critérium at Longchamp Racecourse on 8 October. Starting a 22/1 outsider he dead-heated with Le Marmot, six lengths behind the winner Irish River.

=== 1979: three-year-old season ===
Dickens Hill began his second season in the Vauxhall Trial Stakes over seven furlongs at Phoenix Park Racecourse, in which he finished second to Gerald Martin. He was then moved up in distance and tested against older horses in the ten-furlong Ballymoss Stakes at the Curragh. In the closing stages, he carried his head at a high, awkward angle but won by three quarters of a length from the John Oxx-trained five-year-old Orchestra. On 12 May, Dickens Hill started 5/2 second choice in the betting behind the odds-on favourite Gerald Martin in the Irish 2000 Guineas at the Curragh. The race was run on exceptionally heavy ground: the previous day's card had been cancelled as the turf course had been so waterlogged that it was considered unsafe for racing. Ridden by Tony Murray, Dickens Hill took the lead two furlongs from the finish and won by four lengths despite throwing his head from side to side after going to the front. The value of his victory was questioned by some observers on account of the extreme conditions and the fact that the runner-up, Brother Philips, was a 200/1 outsider with little worthwhile form.

On 6 June, Dickens Hill started at odds of 15/1 for the 200th running of the Derby Stakes over one and a half miles at Epsom Downs Racecourse. The colt was settled in fifth place before accelerating in the straight, taking the lead a furlong from the finish and looking the likely winner. He was quickly overtaken by Troy on the outside and was beaten seven lengths but held on to second place, finishing three lengths ahead of the French-trained Northern Baby in third. The other beaten horses included Ela-Mana-Mou, Tap On Wood and Son of Love. Dickens Hill faced Troy again in the Irish Derby at the Curragh on 30 June. On this occasion, Murray held up the colt at the back of the field before moving through the field to challenge Troy approaching the final furlong, but Dickens Hill again proved no match for the English colt and was beaten four lengths into second place. Seven days after his defeat at the Curragh, Dickens Hill started 7/4 second favourite for one of Britain's most prestigious weight-for-age races, the Eclipse Stakes over ten furlongs at Sandown Park Racecourse. He was re-opposed by Northern Baby, while the older horses included the favourite Swiss Maid (the top-rated three-year-old filly of 1978), Stone (winner of the Gran Premio del Jockey Club and the Premio Presidente della Repubblica) and Crimson Beau (winner of the Prince of Wales's Stakes). Murray tracked the leaders before sending Dickens Hill past Northern Baby and Crimson Beau to take the lead a furlong from the finish. In the closing stages, he stayed on under pressure to win by two lengths from Crimson Beau, with Northern Baby a length away in third.

Dickens Hill was then aimed at the Prix de l'Arc de Triomphe in October and did not run again until 22 September when he started the 1/2 favourite for the Joe McGrath Memorial Stakes at Leopardstown Racecourse. He ran very poorly, reverting to his old habit of throwing his head in the air, making no progress in the closing stages and finishing fifth of the six runners behind the four-year-old Fordham. He was subsequently found to be suffering from a respiratory infection. He did not race in Europe again, being sold to representatives of the Kentucky-based Gainesway Farm and exported to the United States.

=== 1980: four-year-old season ===
In 1980, Dickens Hill was campaigned in the United States where he was trained by H. Allen Jerkens. He raced twice in Florida in March, but failed to reproduce his best European form, finishing third in an allowance race at Hialeah Park Race Track and third behind Morning Frolic and Pearlescent in a three-way photo finish for the Canadian Turf Handicap at Gulfstream Park.

== Assessment ==
In 1978, the independent Timeform organisation gave Dickens Hill a rating of 112, placing him twenty-two pounds below their top-rated two-year-old Tromos. In the Irish Free Handicap, he was rated the seventh-best two-year-old colt to race in Ireland, eleven pounds below Sandy Creek. In the following year he was rated 130 by Timeform, seven pounds behind Troy. In the official International Classification, he was rated the best three-year-old colt in Ireland and the seventh-best three-year-old colt in Europe.

== Stud record ==
Dickens Hill was retired from racing to become a breeding stallion at Gainesway Farm. He made very little impact as a sire of winners, with his most successful performer being the steeplechaser Victorian Hill. The best of his flat race performers were Hudson Newes (Kingston Stakes) and Tropical Whip (Woodlawn Stakes).

== Pedigree ==
Pedigree of Dickens Hill, chestnut stallion, 1976
Sire Mount Hagen (FR) 1971	Bold Bidder (USA); 1962	Bold Ruler	Nasrullah
Sire Mount Hagen (FR) 1971	Bold Bidder (USA); 1962	Bold Ruler	Miss Disco
Sire Mount Hagen (FR) 1971	Bold Bidder (USA); 1962	High Bid	To Market
Sire Mount Hagen (FR) 1971	Bold Bidder (USA); 1962	High Bid	Stepping Stone
Sire Mount Hagen (FR) 1971	Moonmadness (USA); 1963	Tom Fool	Menow
Sire Mount Hagen (FR) 1971	Moonmadness (USA); 1963	Tom Fool	Gaga
Sire Mount Hagen (FR) 1971	Moonmadness (USA); 1963	Sunset	Hyperion
Sire Mount Hagen (FR) 1971	Moonmadness (USA); 1963	Sunset	Fair Ranger
Dam London Life (GB) 1961	Panaslipper (IRE); 1952	Solar Slipper	Windsor Slipper
Dam London Life (GB) 1961	Panaslipper (IRE); 1952	Solar Slipper	Solar Flower
Dam London Life (GB) 1961	Panaslipper (IRE); 1952	Panastrid	Panorama
Dam London Life (GB) 1961	Panaslipper (IRE); 1952	Panastrid	Atrid
Dam London Life (GB) 1961	Court Circular (GB); 1949	Court Martial	Fair Trial
Dam London Life (GB) 1961	Court Circular (GB); 1949	Court Martial	Instantaneous
Dam London Life (GB) 1961	Court Circular (GB); 1949	Queanladdie	Motrico
Dam London Life (GB) 1961	Court Circular (GB); 1949	Queanladdie	Gladiatrix (Family 11-e)
