= Northern Baby =

Canadian-bred Thoroughbred racehorse

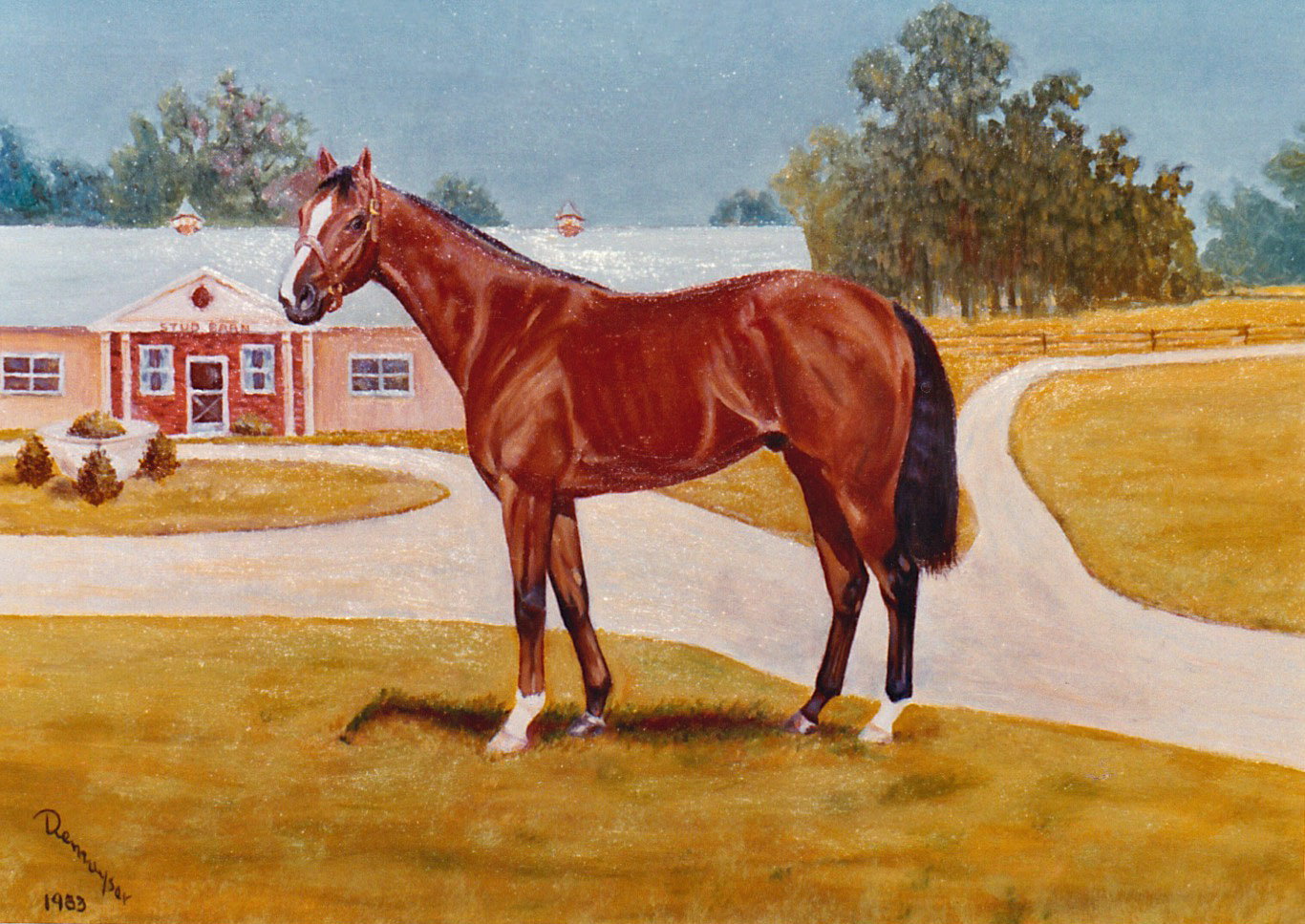
- Northern Baby, oil on canvas painted by Bob Demuyser (1920–2003)
- Sire: Northern Dancer
- Grandsire: Nearctic
- Dam: Two Rings
- Damsire: Round Table
- Sex: Stallion
- Foaled: 1 April 1976
- Country: Canada
- Colour: Chestnut
- Breeder: Kinghaven Farm
- Owner: Anne-Marie d'Estainville
- Trainer: François Boutin
- Record: 17:5-2-5

Major wins
- Prix de la Côte Normande (1979); Champion Stakes (1979); Prix Dollar (1980)

Awards
- Timeform rating 109 (1978), 127 (1979), 119 (1980)

Northern Baby (1 April 1976 – 21 February 2007) was a Canadian-bred, French-trained Thoroughbred racehorse and sire. In a racing career which lasted from October 1978 until September 1980 he won five of his seventeen races. After showing promising form as a two-year-old he emerged as a top-class middle-distance performer in 1979, winning the Prix de la Côte Normande in France but showing his best form in England, where he finished third in both The Derby and the Eclipse Stakes before recording his most important victory in the Champion Stakes. He remained in training as a four-year-old with mixed success, running several moderate races but defeating the outstanding filly Three Troikas in the Prix Dollar. He was retired to stud and became a very successful sire of steeplechasers. He died in 2007 at the advanced age (for a Thoroughbred) of thirty-one.

== Background ==
Northern Baby was a small, lightly built chestnut horse with a narrow white blaze, two white socks and one white coronet, bred by the Kinghaven Farm Stud in Ontario. He was one of many important winners sired by the Canadian-bred Northern Dancer, who won the Kentucky Derby in 1964 before becoming one of the most successful breeding stallions in Thoroughbred history. He was the first foal of Two Rings, a tough and consistent racemare who won nine of her thirty-one races including the Nassau Stakes. Two Rings was great-granddaughter of the broodmare Gallita, whose other descendants included Nadir, Mashaallah and Mark of Esteem.

As a yearling, the colt was offered for sale at Keeneland and was bought for $120,000 by representatives of Anne-Marie d'Estainville. He was sent to race in Europe where he was trained by François Boutin at Chantilly and ridden in most of his major races by Philippe Paquet.

== Racing career ==
=== 1978: two-year-old season ===
Northern Baby did not appear on the racecourse until October 1978 when he was one of eighteen two-year-olds to contest a maiden race over 1600 metres at Saint-Cloud Racecourse and won by one and a half lengths. Later that month he was moved up sharply in class when he was sent to England for the Group One William Hill Futurity over one mile at Doncaster Racecourse. He started third favourite, but was never in contention and finished eighth behind the Irish-trained Sandy Creek.

=== 1979: three-year-old season ===
Northern Baby began his three-year-old season by winning a minor race over 2100m at Saint-Cloud and was then beaten one length by the Alec Head-trained Wolverton in the Prix de Suresnes over 2000m at Longchamp Racecourse. On 20 May, Northern Baby started the 17/4 second favourite for the Group Three Prix La Force, but was again beaten by a runner from the Head stable, finishing second by a head to Fabulous Dancer.

On 6 June, Northern Baby started at 66/1 outsider for the 200th running of the Derby Stakes over one and a half miles at Epsom Downs Racecourse. He raced just behind the leader and turned into the straight in third place before moving up to dispute the lead with two furlongs left to run. He was quickly overtaken by Troy and Dickens Hill but stayed on to finish third, beaten seven lengths and three lengths. Northern Baby returned to England for one of Britain's most prestigious weight-for-age races, the Eclipse Stakes over ten furlongs at Sandown Park Racecourse and finished third behind Dickens Hill and Crimson Beau. In August, the colt was dropped in class for the Group Three Prix de la Côte Normande at Deauville Racecourse in which he started second favourite behind Wolverton. Northern Baby won the race easily by two and a half lengths from Lord Zara, with Wolverton in fourth.

Northern Baby began his autumn campaign in the Prix du Prince d'Orange over 2000m at Longchamp in September, in which he was beaten half a length and a head by the four-year-old colt Rusticaro and the five-year-old mare Trillion. On 7 October Northern Baby started a 90/1 outsider for the Prix de l'Arc de Triomphe. Ridden by the Irish jockey Pat Eddery he briefly took the lead in the straight before fading to finish sixth of the twenty-two runners behind Three Troikas, Le Marmot, Troy, Pevero and Trillion. Two weeks after his run in the Arc, Northern Baby was sent to England for the third time to contest the Group One Champion Stakes over ten furlongs at Newmarket Racecourse. Paquet resumed his partnership with the colt, who started at odds of 9/1 in a field of fourteen runners which included Ela-Mana-Mou, Lyphard's Wish and the French-trained filly Producer (winner of the Prix de l'Opéra and the Prix de la Forêt) who started favourite. Northern Baby moved up to dispute the lead two furlongs and always looked the likely winner. In the closing stages he held off a challenge from the five-year-old Town And Country to win by one and a half lengths, with Haul Knight a neck away in third and Lyphard's Wish in fourth place.

=== 1980: four-year-old season ===
Northern Baby began his third season in the Group One Prix Ganay and Longchamp on 4 May in which he was ridden by Eddery and finished third behind Le Marmot and Three Troikas. On 1 June he met Three Troikas again in the Prix Dollar over 1950m at the same course. Ridden by Paquet, he started the 5.3/1 favourite and won by a length from Strong Gale, with the Arc winner two and a half lengths away in third place. In the Prix d'Ispahan at the end of the month he finished fourth after setting the pace for the winner Nadjar, who raced in the same ownership.

In August, the colt was sent to England again, but failed to reproduce his form of 1979, finishing unplaced behind Master Willie in the Benson and Hedges Gold Cup at York. A month later, Northern Baby was brought back in distance for the Prix du Moulin over 1600m at Longchamp and finished fifth behind Kilijaro. Two weeks later, Northern Baby showed something of a return to form as he finished third behind Dunette and Three Troikas in the Prix du Prince d'Orange, but did not race again.

== Assessment ==
In 1978 the independent Timeform organisation gave Northern Baby a rating of 109, twenty-five pounds below their top-rated two-year-old Tromos. In the following year he was rated 127 by Timeform, ten pounds below the top-rated racehorse Troy. In the official International Classification he was rated thirteen pounds below the top-rated Three Troikas. As a four-year-old, Northern Baby was rated 119 by Timeform, eighteen pounds below the top-rated Moorestyle. In the International Classification he was rated eight pounds behind Moorestyle and seven pounds inferior to the top-rated older horse Ela-Mana-Mou.

== Stud record ==
Northern Baby was retired to stud to begin his career as a breeding stallion at the Grangewilliam Stud near Maynooth in County Kildare. In 1982, he was moved to Stone Farm in Kentucky, where he became "buddies" with the Kentucky Derby winner Gato Del Sol. He sired several top-class flat race performances, but had his greatest success as a sire of steeplechasers. His best winners included:

- Baby Turk, 1982, won Grand Prix de Deauville
- Highland Bud, 1985 American Champion Steeplechase Horse, won two runnings of the Breeders' Cup Steeplechase
- Michelozzo, 1986, won St Leger
- Warm Spell, 1988, American Champion Steeplechase Horse
- Possibly Perfect, 1990, American Champion Female Turf Horse, won Yellow Ribbon Invitational Stakes, Santa Ana Handicap, Gamely Handicap, Ramona Handicap, Beverly D. Stakes
- Noyan, 1990, won 20 races including the Punchestown Gold Cup

Northern Baby was pensioned from breeding duty in 2001. He was euthanized on 21 February 2007 and was buried at Stone Farm.

== Pedigree ==
Pedigree of Northern Baby (CAN), chestnut stallion, 1976
Sire Northern Dancer (CAN) 1961	Nearctic (CAN); 1954	Nearco	Pharos
Sire Northern Dancer (CAN) 1961	Nearctic (CAN); 1954	Nearco	Nogara
Sire Northern Dancer (CAN) 1961	Nearctic (CAN); 1954	Lady Angela	Hyperion
Sire Northern Dancer (CAN) 1961	Nearctic (CAN); 1954	Lady Angela	Sister Sarah
Sire Northern Dancer (CAN) 1961	Natalma (USA); 1957	Native Dancer	Polynesian
Sire Northern Dancer (CAN) 1961	Natalma (USA); 1957	Native Dancer	Geisha
Sire Northern Dancer (CAN) 1961	Natalma (USA); 1957	Almahmoud	Mahmoud
Sire Northern Dancer (CAN) 1961	Natalma (USA); 1957	Almahmoud	Arbitrator
Dam Two Rings (USA) 1970	Round Table (USA); 1954	Princequillo	Prince Rose
Dam Two Rings (USA) 1970	Round Table (USA); 1954	Princequillo	Cosquilla
Dam Two Rings (USA) 1970	Round Table (USA); 1954	Knights Daughter	Sir Cosmo
Dam Two Rings (USA) 1970	Round Table (USA); 1954	Knights Daughter	Feola
Dam Two Rings (USA) 1970	Allofthem (USA); 1964	Bagdad	Double Jay
Dam Two Rings (USA) 1970	Allofthem (USA); 1964	Bagdad	Bazura
Dam Two Rings (USA) 1970	Allofthem (USA); 1964	Gal I Love	Nasrullah
Dam Two Rings (USA) 1970	Allofthem (USA); 1964	Gal I Love	Gallita (Family 17-b)
