= Le Marmot =

French-bred Thoroughbred racehorse

- Sire: Amarko
- Grandsire: Tanerko
- Dam: Malinka
- Damsire: Molvedo
- Sex: Stallion
- Foaled: 14 May 1976
- Country: France
- Colour: Bay
- Breeder: Marquis R de Talhouet Roy
- Owner: Rodolph Schafer
- Trainer: François Boutin
- Record: 14:7-2-2

Major wins
- Prix La Rochette (1978); Prix Greffulhe (1979); Prix Hocquart (1979); Prix Niel (1979); Prix Ganay (1980); Prix Foy (1980)

Awards
- Top-rated French three-year-old colt (1979); Top-rated French older horse(1980); Timeform rating 112 (1978), 130 (1979), 128 (1980)

Le Marmot (14 May 1976 – 1981) was a French Thoroughbred racehorse and sire. He won two of his three race as a two-year-old in 1978 including the Prix La Rochette before emerging as a top-class performer in the following year when he won the Prix Greffulhe, Prix Hocquart and Prix Niel as well as finishing second in the Prix du Jockey Club and the Prix de l'Arc de Triomphe and third in the Washington, D.C. International. As a four-year-old he defeated the Arc de Triomphe winner Three Troikas in the Prix Ganay and also won the Prix Niel. Le Marmot was rated one of the ten best racehorses in Europe in both 1979 and 1980. He had little opportunity to prove himself as a sire of winners, dying in 1981 at the age of five.

== Background ==
Le Marmot was a bay horse with a white sock on his right hind leg bred in France by the Marquis de Talhouet Roy. He was by far the best horse sired by Amarko, who finished second in the Prix d'Harcourt and several major prizes on French provincial tracks including the Grand Prix de Bordeaux and the Derby de l'Ouest. Le Marmot's dam Molinka also won several races in the French Provinces and was a granddaughter of Sanelta, who produced the Prix du Jockey Club and Grand Prix de Paris winner Sanctus.

As a yearling, Le Marmot was sent to the sales and was bought for 205,000 francs (approximately £24,200) by Rodolph Schafer. The colt was sent into training with François Boutin at Chantilly and was ridden in most of his races by Philippe Paquet.

== Racing career ==
=== 1978: two-year-old season ===
Le Marmot made a successful racecourse debut by winning a maiden race over 1100 metres at Chantilly Racecourse in June. He did not race again until 3 September, when he was moved up in class and distance for the Prix La Rochette, a Group Three race over 1600 m at Longchamp Racecourse. He started the 13/10 favourite and produced a strong finish to win by half a length from Echion. On 8 October, Le Marmot started second favourite for the Group One Grand Critérium over the same course and distance but dead-heated for eighth place, six lengths behind the winner Irish River.

=== 1979: three-year-old season ===
Le Marmot began his three-year-old season in the Prix Greffulhe over 2100 m at Longchamp. Starting at odds of 3.9/1, he took the lead in the straight and drew away from his opponents to win by four lengths and one length from Wolverton and Soleil Noir. On 6 May at the same course, Le Marmot started 14/10 favourite for the Prix Hocquart over 2400 m in which he was opposed by High Sierra and Son of Love, who had finished first and second in the Prix Noailles. The colt raced just behind the leaders before accelerating clear of the field in the straight and winning by three lengths from High Sierra.

On 3 June at Chantilly, Le Marmot was matched against Top Ville the winner of the Prix de Guiche and the Prix Lupin in the Group One Prix du Jockey Club over 2400 m at Chantilly. Starting the 6/4 second favourite, he was outpaced when Top Ville went more than three lengths clear of the field in the straight but closed the gap in the last 300 m to finish second by a length, with Sharpman five lengths back in third.

After a break of three months, Le Marmot returned for the Prix Niel at Longchamp on 9 September, when he faced Top Ville for the second time. He was in contention from the start before moving up to dispute the lead in the straight. In a closely contested finish he prevailed by a neck and head from Fabulous Dancer and Kamaridaan, with Top Ville a length and a half further back in fourth place. On 7 October, Le Marmot started the 7.25/1 third favourite for the 58th running of the Prix de l'Arc de Triomphe over 2400 m at Longchamp. Le Marmot raced just behind the leaders before taking the lead from Northern Baby in the straight. He was quickly overtaken by the filly Three Troikas but held on to take second place from the English-trained favourite Troy. In November, Le Marmot was sent to the United States to represent France in the Washington, D.C. International at Laurel Park Racecourse. Paquet attempted to restrain the colt in a slowly run race and found himself boxed in on the rails in the straight. The colt finished strongly, but appeared an unlucky loser, finishing third behind Bowl Game and Trillion.

=== 1980: four-year-old season ===
Le Marmot's first two races of 1980 saw him matched against Three Troikas, the filly who had beaten him in the Arc. On 7 April Le Marmot finished third behind Three Troikas and Gain in the Prix d'Harcourt over 2000 m at Longchamp. On 4 May Le Marmot faced Three Troikas, Gain, Northern Baby and High Sierra at weight-for-age in the Prix Ganay. Starting at odds of 4.6/1, he overtook Northern Baby early in the straight and won decisively by one and a half lengths from the 3/10 favourite Three Troikas.

In July, Le Marmot was sent to England and started favourite for Britain's most prestigious weight-for-age race, the King George VI and Queen Elizabeth Stakes over one and a half miles at Ascot Racecourse. Despite his position in the betting, the colt was not at his best, having had an injury in training which disrupted his preparation and then picking up a knock to his hock when being shipped from France: Paquet was under instructions to withdraw the horse if he showed any sign of lameness before the start. Le Marmot was never going well and hung badly to the left in the last half mile before finishing fifth behind Ela-Mana-Mou.

Le Marmot prepared for his second attempt at the Prix de l'Arc de Triomphe with a run in the Prix Foy on 14 September. Starting the 4/10 favourite, he looked unlikely to win until the final 100 m, when he produced what Timeform described as "a terrific run" to catch the filly Anifa and win by a short neck. On 5 October, Le Marmot started 2/1 favourite for the 57th running of the Prix de l'Arc de Triomphe: he was coupled in the betting with Ela-Mana-Mou, as the Irish breeder Tim Rogers owned a share in both horses. He was among the early leaders but dropped back and eventually finished eighth behind Detroit. He was subsequently found to be lame and did not race again.

== Assessment ==
In 1978, the independent Timeform organisation awarded Le Marmot a rating of 112, twenty-two pounds below their top-rated two-year-old Tromos. In the French Free Handicap a rating of the best two-year-olds to race in France, Le Marmot was rated twelve pounds inferior to Irish River. In the following year, Timeform rated Le Marmot on 120, seven pounds behind their top-rated horse Troy, despite the fact that Le Marmot had defeated the British colt when they met in the Arc. In the official International Classification, Le Marmot was rated the best three-year-old colt in France and the fourth-best horse of any age in Europe behind Three Troikas, Troy and Ile de Bourbon. Le Marmot was rated 128 by Timeform in 1980. In that year's International Classification he was rated the best older horse in France and the equal-fourth-best horse of any age in Europe behind Moorestyle, Argument and Ela-Mana-Mou.

== Stud record ==
Le Marmot was retired from racing to become a breeding stallion at the Haras du Petit Tellier but died 1981, during his first season at stud. His only crop of 20 foals included the Gr.2 Golden Gate Handicap winner Le Solaret.

== Pedigree ==
Pedigree of Le Marmot (FR), bay stallion, 1976
Sire Amarko (FR) 1965	Tanerko (FR); 1953	Tantieme	Deux-Pour-Cent
Sire Amarko (FR) 1965	Tanerko (FR); 1953	Tantieme	Terka
Sire Amarko (FR) 1965	Tanerko (FR); 1953	La Divine	Fair Copy
Sire Amarko (FR) 1965	Tanerko (FR); 1953	La Divine	La Diva
Sire Amarko (FR) 1965	Thamar (FR); 1958	Mat de Cocagne	Birikil
Sire Amarko (FR) 1965	Thamar (FR); 1958	Mat de Cocagne	Fascine
Sire Amarko (FR) 1965	Thamar (FR); 1958	Ines	Admiral Drake
Sire Amarko (FR) 1965	Thamar (FR); 1958	Ines	Ann's Twin
Dam Molinka (FR) 1967	Molvedo (ITY); 1958	Ribot	Tenerani
Dam Molinka (FR) 1967	Molvedo (ITY); 1958	Ribot	Romanella
Dam Molinka (FR) 1967	Molvedo (ITY); 1958	Maggiolina	Nakamuro
Dam Molinka (FR) 1967	Molvedo (ITY); 1958	Maggiolina	Murcia
Dam Molinka (FR) 1967	Telstar (FR); 1962	Cambremer	Chamossaire
Dam Molinka (FR) 1967	Telstar (FR); 1962	Cambremer	Tomorrow
Dam Molinka (FR) 1967	Telstar (FR); 1962	Sanelta	Tourment
Dam Molinka (FR) 1967	Telstar (FR); 1962	Sanelta	Satanella (Family: 16-a)
