= Son of Love =

French-bred Thoroughbred racehorse

- Sire: Jefferson
- Grandsire: Charlottesville
- Dam: Mot d'Amour
- Damsire: Bon Mot
- Sex: Stallion
- Foaled: 24 April 1976
- Country: France
- Colour: Chestnut
- Breeder: Haras du Hoguenet
- Owner: Alexis Rolland
- Trainer: Robert Collet
- Record: 35:3-7-4

Major wins
- Prix Isonomy (1978); St Leger Stakes (1979)

Awards
- Timeform rating: 109 (1978), 126 (1979), 116 (1980)

Son of Love (foaled 24 April 1976) was a French Thoroughbred racehorse best known for winning the classic St Leger Stakes in 1979. After winning two races (including the Prix Isonomy) as a two-year-old, the horse lost his next eleven races before winning the St Leger as a 20/1 outsider. The rest of his career was undistinguished, as he failed to win in seventeen subsequent races.

== Background ==
Son of Love was a chestnut horse with a small white star and a white sock on his left hind leg bred in France by the Haras du Hoguenet. He was sired by Jefferson, a British-bred stallion who recorded his biggest win in the 1971 Prix Gontaut-Biron. Jefferson's only other major winner was Marson, who won the Prix Gladiateur in 1979 and the Prix Kergorlay in 1980. Son of Love was the first foal of his dam Mot d'Amour, who went on to produce Taxi de Nuit, who won the Premio Ribot in 1996. As a descendant of the broodmare Majideh, Mot d'Amour came from the same branch of Thoroughbred family 5e which also produced Masaka, Gallant Man, Kahyasi, Law Society, Milan and Lashkari. As a two-year-old the colt was offered for sale and bought for 40,000 francs (approximately £4,700). During his racing career he was owned by Alexis Rolland and trained by Robert Collet at Chantilly. He was ridden in most of his races by Alain Lequeux.

== Racing career ==
=== 1978: two-year-old season ===
Son of Love ran seven times as a two-year-old in 1978, showing little worthwhile form until the autumn. Having been raced over 1000 m and 1200m in the early part of the year, he was moved up in distance and won a nursery handicap (a handicap race restricted to two-year-olds) over 1700m at Longchamp Racecourse, conceding 11 pounds to the runner-up. He then contested the Prix Isonomy over 2000m at Évry Racecourse and won by half a length from Periculo Ludus. For his final appearance of the season, Son of Love was moved up in class for the Critérium de Saint-Cloud over 2000m on 20 November. The race resulted in a blanket finish, and although the colt finished sixth, he was beaten less than a lengths by the winner Callio.

=== 1979: three-year-old season ===
In the spring of 1979, Son of Love contested several of the trial races for the French Classic Races. He finished third in the Prix de Courcelles, second to High Sierra in the Prix Noailles over 2200m at Longchamp in April and fourth to Le Marmot in the Prix Hocquart in May.

In June Son of Love was sent to England to contest the 200th running of the Epsom Derby. He started a 200/1 outsider and was never a factor in the race, finishing fifteenth behind Troy. Eighteen days later, the colt was moved up in distance for the Group One Grand Prix de Paris over 3000m at Longchamp. Starting at odds of 10/1 he was restrained at the back of the field by Lequeux and was still well adrift of the leaders on the final turn. In the closing stages he made rapid progress, but failed by a head to catch the odds-on favourite Soleil Noir. Son of Love continued to race in France in July and August: he finished second by a neck to Singapore Girl in the Prix Maurice de Nieuil at Saint-Cloud, second by half a length to the six-year-old Campero in the Prix Kergorlay at Deauville Racecourse and fourth behind First Prayer in the Grand Prix de Deauville. The last of these races was notable as it saw the British jockey Lester Piggott being suspended for "borrowing" another rider's whip when he dropped his own in the closing stages.

By the time he was sent to England again for the 203rd running of the St Leger at Doncaster Racecourse Son of Love had run ten times as a three-year-old without winning a race. Son of Love started at odds of 20/1 in a field of seventeen, with the betting being headed by Niniski, the winner of the Geoffrey Freer Stakes and Cracaval, who had recorded an upset win over Ile de Bourbon in the September Stakes. The most serious French challengers appeared to be Scorpio and Soleil Noir. Scorpio led the field into the straight, where he was overtaken by Niniski, with Stetchworth, Milford and Soleil Noir also moving forward. A furlong from the finish Soleil Noir took the lead and Son of Love, who had been making steady progress under a strong ride from Lequeux emerged as his only challenger. The two French colts drew away from the field, with Son of Love prevailing by a short head in a "driving finish".

For his two remaining races of the season Son of Love was sent to compete in North America. On October 27 he started the 31/1 outsider for the Turf Classic at Aqueduct Racetrack and finished fifth of the seven runners behind Bowl Game. Two weeks later he finished fourth in the Washington, D.C. International behind Bowl Game, Trillion and Le Marmot. It was reported that Son of Love would continue his racing career in the United States, but he returned to France at the end of the year.

=== Later career ===
Son of Love remained in training for two more years but had little success. His best performances came when finishing third in the Prix Exbury in 1980 and second to Perrault in La Coupe in 1981.

== Assessment ==
In 1978, Son of Love was given a rating of 109 by the independent Timeform organisation, placing him twenty-five pounds behind their leading two-year-old Tromos. In the French Free Handicap, a ranking of the best two-year-olds to race in France, he was rated thirteen pounds behind the colt Irish River and the filly Sigy. In the following year, Son of Love was rated 126 by Timeform, eleven pounds behind their top-rated three-year-old Troy. In the official International Classification he was rated the ninth best three-year-old colt in Europe, ten pounds below Troy.

In their book, A Century of Champions, based on the Timeform rating system, John Randall and Tony Morris rated Son of Love an "inferior" winner of the St Leger.

== Pedigree ==
Pedigree of Son of Love (FR), chestnut stallion, 1976
Sire Jefferson (GB) 1967	Charlottesville (GB); 1957	Prince Chevalier	Prince Rose
Sire Jefferson (GB) 1967	Charlottesville (GB); 1957	Prince Chevalier	Chevalerie
Sire Jefferson (GB) 1967	Charlottesville (GB); 1957	Noorani	Nearco
Sire Jefferson (GB) 1967	Charlottesville (GB); 1957	Noorani	Empire Glory
Sire Jefferson (GB) 1967	Monticella (FR); 1955	Cranach	Coronach
Sire Jefferson (GB) 1967	Monticella (FR); 1955	Cranach	Reine Isaure
Sire Jefferson (GB) 1967	Monticella (FR); 1955	Montenica	Djebel*
Sire Jefferson (GB) 1967	Monticella (FR); 1955	Montenica	Nica*
Dam Mot d'Amour (FR) 1970	Bon Mot (FR); 1963	Worden	Wild Risk
Dam Mot d'Amour (FR) 1970	Bon Mot (FR); 1963	Worden	Sans Tares
Dam Mot d'Amour (FR) 1970	Bon Mot (FR); 1963	Djebel Idra	Phil Drake
Dam Mot d'Amour (FR) 1970	Bon Mot (FR); 1963	Djebel Idra	Djebellica*
Dam Mot d'Amour (FR) 1970	Anamour (FR); 1961	Amber	Zuccarello
Dam Mot d'Amour (FR) 1970	Anamour (FR); 1961	Amber	Pantomime
Dam Mot d'Amour (FR) 1970	Anamour (FR); 1961	Princess Niloufer	Tantieme
Dam Mot d'Amour (FR) 1970	Anamour (FR); 1961	Princess Niloufer	Malekeh (Family: 5-e)

* Son of Love is inbred 4S x 5D to the stallion Djebel, meaning that he appears fourth generation on the sire side of his pedigree and fifth generation (via Djebelica) on the dam side of his pedigree.

* Son of Love is inbred 4S x 5D to the mare Nica, meaning that she appears fourth generation on the sire side of his pedigree and fifth generation (via Djeblica) on the dam side of his pedigree.
