= Prix Greffulhe =

Flat horse race in France

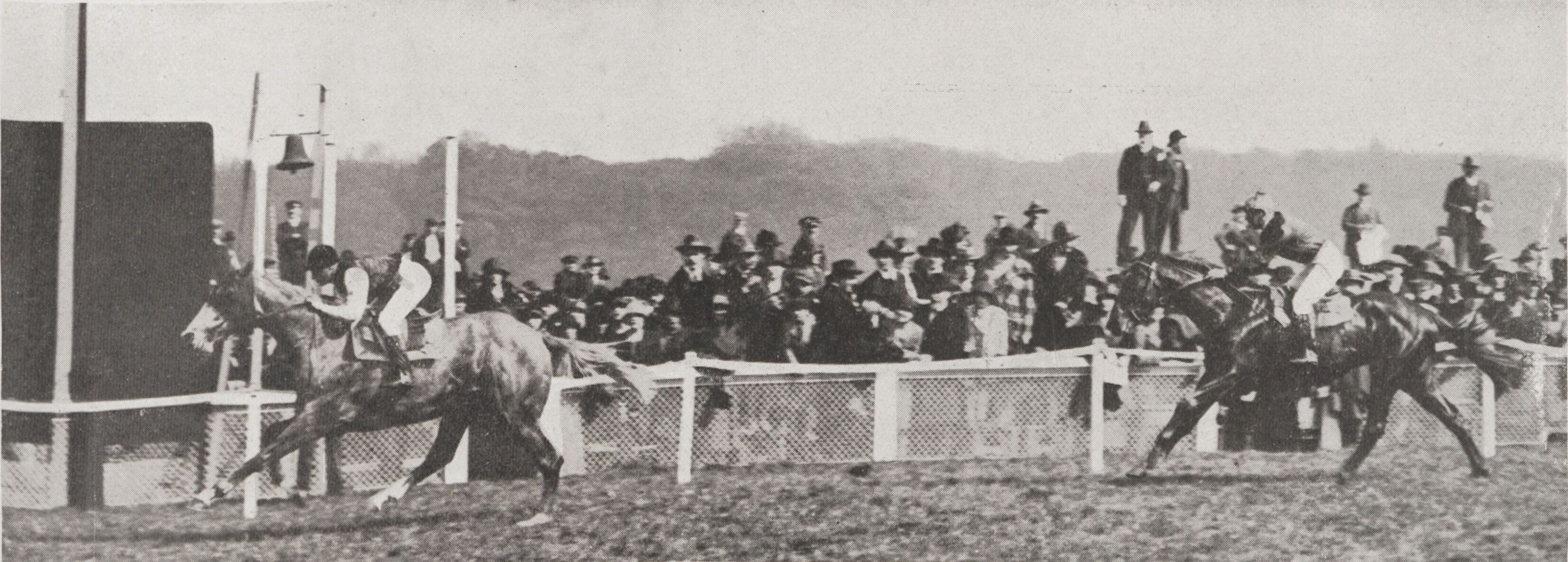
- 1925 winner, Belfonds
- Class: Group 2
- Location: Saint-Cloud Racecourse; Saint-Cloud, France
- Inaugurated: 1882
- Race type: Flat / Thoroughbred
- Website: france-galop.com

Race information
- Distance: 2,000 metres (1¼ miles)
- Surface: Turf
- Track: Left-handed
- Qualification: Three-year-olds
- Weight: 58 kg Allowances; 1½ kg for fillies
- Purse: €130,000 (2022); 1st: €74,100

Prix Greffulhe
2022
Onesto	Agave	Sir Bob Parker

Previous years
2021
Baby Rider	Smile Makers	Martial Eagle

2020-2011
2020
Gold Trip	Influx	In Swoop
2019
Roman Candle	Pappalino	Starmaniac
2018
Study Of Man	Alounak	Alhadab
2017
Recoletos	Waldgeist	Akihiro
2016
Cloth Of Stars	Robin Of Navan	Kidmenever
2015
Sumbal	Untold Secret	Kouros Jelois
2014
Prince Gibraltar	Earnshaw	Nolohay
2013
Ocovango	Bravodino	Wire To Wire
2012
Kesampour	Albion	Navel Orange
2011
Pour Moi	Bubble Chic	Vadamar

2010–2001
2010
Ice Blue	Handsome Devil	Green Rock
2009
Cutlass Bay	Cavalryman	Allybar
2008
Prospect Wells	Ripple	Trois Rois
2007
Quest For Honor	Sagara	Sunshine Kid
2006
Visindar	Onerous	Hello Sunday
2005
Vatori	Plea Bargain	Melanosporum
2004
Millemix	Day Or Night	Vassilievsky
2003
Dalakhani	Jipapibaquigrafo	Fairly Ransom
2002
Act One	Caesarion	Without Connexion
2001
Maille Pistol	Nolt	Chichicastenango

2000–1990
2000
Rhenium	Boutron	Aristotle
1999
Montjeu	Sendawar	Gracioso
1998
Croco Rouge	Cantilever	Petit Versailles
1997
Peintre Celebre	Astarabad	Kashwan
1996
Ragmar	Egeo	Radevore
1995
Diamond Mix	Angel Falls	Denver County
1994
Tikkanen	Solid Illusion	Dare And Go
1993
Hunting Hawk	Bigstone	Talloires
1992
Apple Tree	Break Bread	Silver Kite
1991
Suave Dancer	Beau Sultan	Toulon
1990
Epervier Bleu	Theatre Critic	Priolo

The Prix Greffulhe is a Group 2 flat horse race in France open to three-year-old horses. It is run over a distance of 2,000 metres (about 1¼ miles) at Saint-Cloud in May.

== History ==
The event is named in memory of Henri Greffulhe (1815–1879), a long-serving member of the Société d'Encouragement. It was established in 1882, and was originally run at Longchamp over 2,100 metres.

The Prix Greffulhe was one of several trials for the Prix du Jockey Club collectively known as the Poules des Produits. The others (listed by their modern titles) were the Prix Daru, the Prix Lupin, the Prix Hocquart and the Prix Noailles. The Prix Greffulhe was restricted to the colts and fillies born and bred in France. It was funded by entries submitted before a horse's birth, in the year of conception.

The race was abandoned throughout World War I, with no running from 1915 to 1919. It was contested at Le Tremblay over 2,150 metres from 1943 to 1945.

The Prix Greffulhe was transferred to Saint-Cloud and shortened to 2,000 metres in 2005.

Twenty-three winners of the Prix Greffulhe have achieved victory in the Prix du Jockey Club. The first was Gospodar in 1894, and the most recent was Study of Man in 2018. Two winners, Sea Bird (1965) and Pour Moi (2011), subsequently won The Derby.

The Prix Greffulhe, which was previously restricted to colts and fillies, was opened to geldings from the 2020 running.

== Records ==
Leading jockey (6 wins):

- Stéphane Pasquier - Vatori (2005), Ice Blue (2010), Study Of Man (2018), Gold Trip (2020), Baby Rider (2021), Onesto (2022)

Leading trainer (13 wins):

- André Fabre – Along All (1989), Apple Tree (1992), Hunting Hawk (1993), Diamond Mix (1995), Peintre Celebre (1997), Visindar (2006), Quest for Honor (2007), Prospect Wells (2008), Cutlass Bay (2009), Pour Moi (2011), Ocovango (2013), Cloth Of Stars (2016), Roman Candle (2019)

Leading owner (7 wins):

- Marcel Boussac – Asterus (1926), Tourbillon (1931), Cillas (1938), Ardan (1944), Ambiorix (1949), Scratch (1950), Dankaro (1974)
- HH Aga Khan IV – Hafiz (1955), Naasiri (1978), Darshaan (1984), Mouktar (1985), Dalakhani (2003), Visindar (2006), Kesampour (2012)

== Winners since 1979 ==
Year	Winner	Jockey	Trainer	Owner	Time
1973	Roi Lear	Freddy Head	Alec Head	Germaine Wertheimer	2:13.50
1974	Dankaro	Gerard Rivases	Roger Poincelet	Marcel Boussac	2:16.10
1975	Mariacci	Gerard Rivases	Jean-Michel de Choubersky	Guy de Rothschild	2:28.10
1976	Youth	Gerard Dubroeucq	Maurice Zilber	Nelson Bunker Hunt	2:20.70
1977	Rex Magna	Philippe Paquet	François Boutin	Mme J Couturie	2:25.10
1978	Naasiri	Henri Samani	François Mathet	Aga Khan IV	2:16.20
1979	Le Marmot	Philippe Paquet	François Boutin	Rodolph Schafer	2:25.20
1980	Providential	Philippe Paquet	François Boutin	Serge Fradkoff	2:13.10
1981	The Wonder	Lester Piggott	Jacques de Chevigny	Mrs Alain du Breil	2:15.20
1982	Bois de Grace	Henri Samani	François Mathet	Guy de Rothschild	2:17.70
1983	Dom Pasquini	Yves Saint-Martin	Robert Collet	Mrs Daniel Bertrand	2:32.90
1984	Darshaan	Yves Saint-Martin	Alain de Royer-Dupré	Aga Khan IV	2:19.30
1985	Mouktar	Yves Saint-Martin	Alain de Royer-Dupré	Aga Khan IV	2:35.60
1986	Arokar	Cash Asmussen	Jacques de Chevigny	Prince Kais Al Said	2:28.30
1987	Persifleur	Tony Cruz	Patrick Biancone	Daniel Wildenstein	2:12.80
1988	Soft Machine	Alfred Gibert	Patrick Rago	Bertrand Lavelot	2:13.70
1989	Along All	Cash Asmussen	André Fabre	Daniel Wildenstein	2:18.90
1990	Epervier Bleu	Dominique Boeuf	Élie Lellouche	Daniel Wildenstein	2:19.80
1991	Suave Dancer	Cash Asmussen	John Hammond	Henri Chalhoub	2:16.30
1992	Apple Tree	Thierry Jarnet	André Fabre	Paul de Moussac	2:14.70
1993	Hunting Hawk	Thierry Jarnet	André Fabre	Sheikh Mohammed	2:18.40
1994	Tikkanen	Cash Asmussen	Jonathan Pease	George Strawbridge	2:14.50
1995	Diamond Mix	Thierry Jarnet	André Fabre	Jean-Luc Lagardère	2:21.50
1996	Ragmar	Gérald Mossé	Pascal Bary	Jean-Louis Bouchard	2:10.60
1997	Peintre Celebre	Olivier Peslier	André Fabre	Daniel Wildenstein	2:14.00
1998	Croco Rouge	Sylvain Guillot	Pascal Bary	Wafic Saïd	2:25.30
1999	Montjeu	Cash Asmussen	John Hammond	Michael Tabor	2:20.10
2000	Rhenium (Note: Aristotle finished first in 2000, but he was relegated to third place following a stewards' inquiry)	Thierry Jarnet	Jean-Claude Rouget	Robert Bousquet	2:30.00
2001	Maille Pistol	Jean-René Dubosc	Jean-Claude Rouget	Michel Roussel	2:28.50
2002	Act One	Thierry Gillet	Jonathan Pease	Gerald Leigh	2:18.50
2003	Dalakhani	Christophe Soumillon	Alain de Royer-Dupré	HH Aga Khan IV	2:17.30
2004	Millemix	Christophe Lemaire	Criquette Head-Maarek	Alec Head	2:12.90
2005	Vatori	Stéphane Pasquier	Philippe Demercastel	Ecurie Bader	2:08.20
2006	Visindar	Christophe Soumillon	André Fabre	HH Aga Khan IV	2:03.10
2007	Quest for Honor	Christophe Soumillon	André Fabre	Moussac Family	2:09.90
2008	Prospect Wells	Olivier Peslier	André Fabre	Wertheimer et Frère	2:11.60
2009	Cutlass Bay	Frankie Dettori	André Fabre	Sheikh Mohammed	2:14.50
2010	Ice Blue	Stéphane Pasquier	Pascal Bary	Khalid Abdullah	2:07.80
2011	Pour Moi	Mickael Barzalona	André Fabre	Magnier / Smith / Tabor	2:03.20
2012	Kesampour	Christophe Lemaire	Mikel Delzangles	HH Aga Khan IV	2:09.40
2013	Ocovango	Pierre-Charles Boudout	André Fabre	Prince A A Faisal	2:06.96
2014	Prince Gibraltar	Christophe Soumillon	Jean-Claude Rouget	Jean-François Gribomont	2:13.56
2015	Sumbal	Andrea Atzeni	Francis-Henri Graffard	Qatar Racing Ltd	2:13.04
2016	Cloth of Stars	Mickael Barzalona	André Fabre	Godolphin	2:03.70
2017	Recoletos	Olivier Peslier	Carlos Laffon-Parias	Sarl Darpat France	2:13.97
2018	Study Of Man	Stéphane Pasquier	Pascal Bary	Flaxman Holdings	2:19.29
2019	Roman Candle	Mickael Barzalona	André Fabre	Godolphin	2:12.55
2020	Gold Trip (Note: The 2020 race was run at Lyon Parilly in June due to the COVID-19 pandemic in France)	Stéphane Pasquier	Fabrice Chappet	Jean-Louis Bouchard	2:22.09
2021	Baby Rider	Stéphane Pasquier	Pascal Bary	Jean-Louis Bouchard	2:10.12
2022	Onesto	Stéphane Pasquier	Fabrice Chappet	Jean-Pierre-Joseph Dubois	2:11.43
2023	Greenland	Christophe Soumillon	Aidan O'Brien	Magnier / Smith / Tabor, & Westerberg	2:17.86
2024	Wootton Verni	Cristian Demuro	Jerome Andreu	Dubois / Seroul	2:14.79
2025	Midak	Mickael Barzalona	Francis-Henri Graffard	Aga Khan Studs SCEA	2:11.64
2026	Alam	Antoine Hamelin	Mikel Delzangles	Al Shaqab Racing	2:13:82

== Earlier winners ==
- 1882: Clio
- 1883: Farfadet
- 1884: Serge
- 1885: Palamede
- 1886: Sauterelle
- 1887: Brio
- 1888: Bocage
- 1889: Chopine
- 1890: Cerbere
- 1891: Reverend
- 1892: Fra Angelico
- 1893: Arkansas
- 1894: Gospodar
- 1895: Le Sagittaire
- 1896: Montreuil
- 1897: Palmiste
- 1898: Le Roi Soleil
- 1899: Tapis Vert
- 1900: Cymbalier
- 1901: Passaro
- 1902: Maximum
- 1903: Chatte Blanche
- 1904: Monsieur Charvet
- 1905: Genial
- 1906: Brisecoeur
- 1907: Kalisz
- 1908: Kenilworth
- 1909: Union
- 1910: Nuage
- 1911: Combourg
- 1912: Patrick
- 1913: Nimbus
- 1914: Diderot
- 1915–19: no race
- 1920: Flowershop
- 1921: Tacite
- 1922: Kefalin
- 1923: Checkmate
- 1924: Tapin / Nethou *
- 1925: Belfonds
- 1926: Asterus
- 1927: Lusignan
- 1928: Ivanoe
- 1929: Verdi
- 1930: Veloucreme
- 1931: Tourbillon
- 1932: Sagace
- 1933: Antenor
- 1934: Maravedis
- 1935: Mansur
- 1936: Fastnet
- 1937: Samy
- 1938: Cillas
- 1939: Bacchus
- 1940: Tresor
- 1941: Le Pacha
- 1942: Arcot
- 1943: Pensbury
- 1944: Ardan
- 1945: Mistral
- 1946: Prince Chevalier
- 1947: Chesterfield
- 1948: Rigolo
- 1949: Ambiorix
- 1950: Scratch
- 1951: Sicambre
- 1952: Silnet
- 1953: Marly Knowe
- 1954: Major
- 1955: Hafiz
- 1956: Patras
- 1957: Amber
- 1958: Upstart
- 1959: Herbager
- 1960: Hautain
- 1961: Devon
- 1962: Whippoorwill
- 1963: Le Mesnil
- 1964: Free Ride
- 1965: Sea Bird
- 1966: Hauban
- 1967: Roi Dagobert
- 1968: Val d'Aoste
- 1969: Prince Regent
- 1970: Magic Hope
- 1971: Rheffic
- 1972: Sancy
- 1973: Roi Lear

* The 1924 race was a dead-heat and has joint winners.

== See also ==
- List of French flat horse races
