= Ragmar =

French-bred Thoroughbred racehorse

- Sire: Tropular
- Grandsire: Troy
- Dam: Reggae
- Damsire: New Chapter
- Sex: Stallion
- Foaled: 26 March 1993
- Country: France
- Colour: Chestnut
- Breeder: Georges Sandor & Mme G Sandor
- Owner: Ecurie Jean-Louis Bouchard
- Trainer: Pascal Bary
- Record: 5: 2-2-1

Major wins
- Prix Greffulhe (1996); Prix du Jockey Club (1996)

Ragmar (26 March 1993 – after 2012) was a French Thoroughbred racehorse and sire. As a juvenile he finished second in a well-contested minor event on his debut and was then narrowly beaten in the Critérium de Saint-Cloud. In the following spring he won the Prix Greffulhe and then recorded his biggest success in the Prix du Jockey Club, beating Helissio into fifth place. He was well beaten in his only subsequent race and was retired to stud. He had limited opportunities to prove himself as a sire of flat horses but had some success with his jumpers.

== Background ==
Ragmar was a chestnut horse bred in France by Georges Sandor & Mme G Sandor. His sire Tropular, was from the first crop of foals sired by the Derby winner Troy. He won two minor races before being retired to stud where the best of his other winners was the Prix d'Aumale winner Guislaine. Ragmar's dam Reggae made no impact as a racehorse but was distantly related to the Prix de l'Arc de Triomphe winner Prince Royal.

Ragmar was bought by Gerard Larrieu of Chantilly Bloodstock, acting on behalf of Jean-Louis Bouchard. During his racing career, the colt was trained by Pascal Bary.

== Racing career ==
=== 1995: two-year-old season ===
On his racecourse debut Ragmar contested the Prix de Courcevelles over 1600 metres at Deauville Racecourse on 8 August when he was ridden by Thierry Jarnet. He finished second, beaten one-and-a-half lengths by Le Triton, a Criquette Head-trained colt who went on to win the Prix La Rochette and the Prix Jean Prat. Dominique Boeuf took over the ride when the colt was moved up in class and distance for the Group One Critérium de Saint-Cloud over 2000 metres on 29 October. He was the 8.8/1 fourth choice in the betting behind the André Fabre-trained Quorum, the Richmond Stakes winner Polaris Flight and the Prix de Condé winner Go Between. Restrained at the back of the five-runner field he made strong progress in the straight but failed by a short-head to catch Polaris Flight.

=== 1996: three-year-old season ===
On his first appearance as a three-year-old Ragmar started the 2/1 second favourite for the Group Two Prix Greffulhe over 2100 metres at Longchamp Racecourse on 21 April. Khalid Abdullah's colt Radevore started favourite, whilst the other runners included Oliviero (third to Helissio in the Prix Noailles). Ridden by Mosse, he raced in third before taking the lead inside the last 200 metres and drew away to win by three lengths from Egeo, with Radevore two lengths back in third. Ragmar missed a clash with Helissio in the Prix Lupin. According to his owner, this was for two reasons: "One is rational, to avoid a hard race against Helissio. The other is more emotional, to be able to dream a little longer."

On 2 June Ragmar contested the 159th running of the Prix du Jockey Club over 2400 metres on firm ground at Chantilly Racecourse. Radevore, Polaris Flight and Oliviero where again in opposition, but Helissio was made favourite at odds of 13/10. Other contenders included Grape Tree Road (Prix de Suresnes), High Baroque (Chester Vase), L'Africain Bleu (Prix de l'Avre), Arbatax (Prix Hocquart). Starting at odds of 9.3/1, Ragmar was held up by Mosse towards the rear of the field before making progress in the straight. He took the lead 200 metres from the finish and held on to win by a nose and a short neck from Polaris Flight and Le Destin with Helissio in fifth. Four weeks later the colt was matched against older horses for the first time in the Grand Prix de Saint-Cloud and started 5.7/1 third favourite behind Swain and Helissio. Ragmar raced in fourth place but was unable to accelerate in the straight and finished seventh of the nine runners.

== Stud record ==
At the end of his racing career, Ragmar became a breeding stallion, standing at the Haras de Saint-Gatien before being bought by the French National Stud. He was not popular with flat racing breeders but was more successful as a sire of steeplechasers, covering many AQPS mares. Whilst based at Cluny in 1999 he was described as "a magnificent stallion, with a beautiful conformation and an even temperament". He later moved to Britain where he was standing at the Vauterhill Stud in Devon as late as 2013. The most successful of his offspring has probably been Quartz de Thaix, who won nine National Hunt races between 2009 and 2012.

== Pedigree ==
Pedigree of Ragmar (FR), chestnut stallion, 1993
| Sire Tropular (GB) 1981 | Troy (GB); 1976 | Petingo | Petition |
| Sire Tropular (GB) 1981 | Troy (GB); 1976 | Petingo | Alcazar |
| Sire Tropular (GB) 1981 | Troy (GB); 1976 | La Milo | Hornbeam |
| Sire Tropular (GB) 1981 | Troy (GB); 1976 | La Milo | Pin Prick |
| Sire Tropular (GB) 1981 | Popular Win (GB); 1975 | Lorenzaccio | Klairon |
| Sire Tropular (GB) 1981 | Popular Win (GB); 1975 | Lorenzaccio | Phoenissa |
| Sire Tropular (GB) 1981 | Popular Win (GB); 1975 | Jakomima | Diatome |
| Sire Tropular (GB) 1981 | Popular Win (GB); 1975 | Jakomima | Vivien |
| Dam Reggae (FR) 1980 | New Chapter (GB); 1966 | Crepello | Donatello |
| Dam Reggae (FR) 1980 | New Chapter (GB); 1966 | Crepello | Crepuscule |
| Dam Reggae (FR) 1980 | New Chapter (GB); 1966 | Matatina | Grey Sovereign |
| Dam Reggae (FR) 1980 | New Chapter (GB); 1966 | Matatina | Zanzara |
| Dam Reggae (FR) 1980 | Moon Dancer (FR); 1974 | Tarbes | Tarquin |
| Dam Reggae (FR) 1980 | Moon Dancer (FR); 1974 | Tarbes | Djeida |
| Dam Reggae (FR) 1980 | Moon Dancer (FR); 1974 | Missy | Frontin |
| Dam Reggae (FR) 1980 | Moon Dancer (FR); 1974 | Missy | Ma (Family:3-h) |
