= Mouktar =

Irish-bred Thoroughbred racehorse

- Sire: Nishapour
- Grandsire: Zeddaan
- Dam: Molitva
- Damsire: Tompion
- Sex: Stallion
- Foaled: 19 January 1982
- Country: Ireland
- Colour: Grey
- Breeder: Aga Khan IV
- Owner: Aga Khan IV
- Trainer: Alain de Royer-Dupré
- Record: 7: 6-0-0

Major wins
- Critérium de Saint-Cloud (1984); Prix Greffulhe (1985); Prix Hocquart (1985); Prix du Jockey Club (1985); Prix Niel (1985)

Awards
- Top-rated French two-year-old (1984); Top-rated French three-year-old (1985); Timeform rating: 124p (1984), 129 (1985)

Mouktar (foaled 19 January 1982) was an Irish-bred, French-trained Thoroughbred racehorse and sire. Bred and owned by the Aga Khan, he was undefeated in his first five races including the Critérium de Saint-Cloud, Prix Greffulhe, Prix Hocquart and Prix du Jockey Club before finishing unplaced behind Law Society in the Irish Derby. He won the Prix Niel on his only subsequent appearance and was retired to stud at the end of his three-year-old season.

== Background ==
Mouktar was a "fine, big, rangy" grey horse bred in Ireland by his owner Aga Khan IV. He was sired by the grey stallion Nishapour, who won the Poule d'Essai des Poulains for the Aga Khan in 1978 and sired the Prix de Diane winner Shemaka and the Racing Post Trophy winner Beauchamp King. Mouktar's dam Molitva won two races over one and half miles and was a descendant of François Dupré's racemare Mirna, who won the Prix de la Forêt and the Prix du Moulin.

The colt was sent into training with Alain de Royer-Dupré at Chantilly and was ridden in most of his races by Yves Saint-Martin.

== Racing career ==
=== 1986: two-year-old season ===
Mouktar did not make his racecourse debut until late October 1984 when he won a maiden race over 1800 metres at Longchamp Racecourse against nine opponents. In November he was moved up in class to contest the Group two Critérium de Saint-Cloud over 2000 metres. Mouktar started the odds-on favourite in field of fourteen runners. He took the lead in the straight and drew clear of the field to win by six lengths from Hello Bill.

=== 1985: three-year-old season ===
In April 1985, Mouktar made his first appearance of the season in the Prix Greffulhe over 2000 metres at Longchamp. Racing on very soft ground, he started the 1/5 favourite and won easily from French School. In May Mouktar started the 3/10 favourite for the Prix Hocquart over 2400 metres. Racing on much faster ground he led from the start and was never seriously challenged, winning comfortably from Premier Role.

On 9 June, Mouktar started the 1/5 favourite for the Prix du Jockey Club over 2400 metres at Chantilly Racecourse. He took the lead from the pacemaker Gottardo at half distance and won by two and a half lengths from Air de Cour. Timeform described the race as "dull and uninteresting", pointing out that many of the best French-trained colts, including Baillamont and Sumayr had bypassed the event in favour of the Prix Jean Prat and the Grand Prix de Paris. Commenting of the ease of Mouktar's win, Saint-Martin called the winner "an exceptional horse who has never been under pressure in his life". Three weeks after his win at Chantilly, Mouktar was sent to the Curragh to contest the Irish Derby against a field which included Law Society, Triptych, Damister and Baillamont. Mouktar was accompanied by his regular traveling companion, a pony which helped to soothe his nervous disposition. He started the 9/4 second favourite but after taking the lead early in the straight he faded in the last two furlongs and finished seventh of the thirteen runners behind Law Society.

In September, Mouktar ran in the Prix Niel at Longchamp, and won by a nose from Saint Estephe to whom he was conceding two pounds. He was entered in the Prix de l'Arc de Triomphe but was withdrawn from the race and retired.

== Assessment ==
In the official International Classification for 1984, Mouktar was the highest-rated two-year-old trained in France, four pounds below the British colt Kala Dancer. The independent Timeform organisation rated him at 124p, the "p" indicating that he was likely to make significant improvement. As a three-year-old, Mouktar was given a Timeform rating of 129, seven pounds behind the top-rated Slip Anchor. In the International Classification he was the top-rated three-year-old trained in France and the seventh highest-rated horse in Europe behind Slip Anchor, Petoski, Rainbow Quest, Sagace, Pebbles and Shadeed.

== Stud record ==
Mouktar was retired from racing to become a breeding stallion at his owner's Ballymany Stud in County Kildare. He was not a great success at stud, but sired a few good winners including the Japanese Group Three winner Mayano Petrus and the steeplechaser Morceli who won the Dipper Novices' Chase and Maghull Novices' Chase in 1996.

== Pedigree ==
Pedigree of Mouktar (IRE), grey horse, 1982
Sire Nishapour (FR) 1975	Zeddaan (GB); 1965	Grey Sovereign	Nasrullah
Sire Nishapour (FR) 1975	Zeddaan (GB); 1965	Grey Sovereign	Kong
Sire Nishapour (FR) 1975	Zeddaan (GB); 1965	Vareta	Vilmorin
Sire Nishapour (FR) 1975	Zeddaan (GB); 1965	Vareta	Veronique
Sire Nishapour (FR) 1975	Alama (IRE); 1969	Aureole	Hyperion
Sire Nishapour (FR) 1975	Alama (IRE); 1969	Aureole	Angelola
Sire Nishapour (FR) 1975	Alama (IRE); 1969	Nucciolina	Nuccio
Sire Nishapour (FR) 1975	Alama (IRE); 1969	Nucciolina	Mah Behar
Dam Molitva (GB) 1973	Tompion (USA); 1957	Tom Fool	Menow
Dam Molitva (GB) 1973	Tompion (USA); 1957	Tom Fool	Gaga
Dam Molitva (GB) 1973	Tompion (USA); 1957	Sunlight	Count Fleet
Dam Molitva (GB) 1973	Tompion (USA); 1957	Sunlight	Halcyon Days
Dam Molitva (GB) 1973	Mislava (FR); 1968	Tanerko	Tantieme
Dam Molitva (GB) 1973	Mislava (FR); 1968	Tanerko	La Divine
Dam Molitva (GB) 1973	Mislava (FR); 1968	Mirna	Mourne
Dam Molitva (GB) 1973	Mislava (FR); 1968	Mirna	Mitzika (Family 5-b)
