= Ela-Mana-Mou =

British-bred Thoroughbred racehorse

- Sire: Pitcairn
- Grandsire: Petingo
- Dam: Rose Bertin
- Damsire: High Hat
- Sex: Stallion
- Foaled: 1976
- Country: United Kingdom
- Colour: Bay
- Breeder: Patrick Clarke
- Owner: Audry Muinos; Simon Weinstock
- Trainer: Guy Harwood; Dick Hern
- Record: 16:10-2-2
- Earnings: £286,581

Major wins
- Royal Lodge Stakes (1978); King Edward VII Stakes (1979); Earl of Sefton Stakes (1980); Prince of Wales's Stakes (1980); Eclipse Stakes (1980); King George VI and Queen Elizabeth Stakes (1980)

Awards
- European Champion Older Horse (1980); Timeform rating: 132; Leading British money winner (1980)

Ela-Mana-Mou (1976–2008) was a British Thoroughbred race horse and sire. In a career which lasted from 1978 until October 1980, he ran sixteen times and won ten races. He was one of the best British two-year-olds of 1978, when he defeated Troy in the Royal Lodge Stakes. At three, he won the King Edward VII Stakes and was the beaten favourite for The Derby. Ela-Mana-Mou had his most successful season as a four-year-old in 1980 when he won his first four races including the Eclipse Stakes and the King George VI and Queen Elizabeth Stakes. He later became a highly successful sire of winners before his death in 2008.

== Background ==
Ela-Mana-Mou was foaled in 1976 in Ireland. He was a dark-coated bay horse with three white socks, bred by Patrick Clarke. He was one of the first crop of foals sired by the Goodwood Mile winner Pitcairn, who was exported to Japan before Ela-Mana-Mou became a champion. As a yearling, he was sent to the sales and purchased for 4,500 guineas by Max and Audry Muinos. The colt was initially sent into training with Guy Harwood at Pulborough, West Sussex. His name is a transliteration of the Greek έλα μάνα μου, which can be translated as "Come on, my darling" (slang term – literally translated as "come on, my mother").

== Racing career ==
=== 1978: two-year-old season ===
Ela-Mana-Mou made a successful racecourse debut at Newbury in June when he won a six-furlong maiden race. He followed up in July by winning the Willow Stakes over the same distance at Kempton Park Racecourse. Later in the month, he was moved up in class for the Vintage Stakes at Goodwood in which he finished second to the Dick Hern-trained Troy. On his next appearance, Ela-Mana-Mou won a nursery handicap at Lingfield and was then moved back up in class for the Royal Lodge Stakes at Ascot Racecourse in which he was matched against Troy again. Ela-Mana-Mou recorded an upset victory, beating Troy by three-quarters of a length, with Lyphard's Wish in third.

=== 1979: three-year-old season ===
As a three-year-old, Ela-Mana-Mou was trained for the 200th Epsom Derby and won the Heath Stakes at Newmarket on his debut. During the build-up to the Derby, Harwood monitored the horse around the clock by installing a closed-circuit camera in his stable.

At Epsom Downs Racecourse, Ela-Mana-Mou started favourite for the Derby at odds of 9/2 ahead of Troy and the Queen's colt Milford. Ridden by Greville Starkey, Ela-Mana-Mou was restrained in the early stages before making steady progress in the straight but was never able to reach the leaders and finished fourth behind Troy, Dickens Hill, and Northern Baby. Two weeks after his defeat at Epsom, he was sent to Royal Ascot, where he was an easy winner of the King Edward VII Stakes. He was then sent to France, where he finished second to Gay Mecene in the Grand Prix de Saint-Cloud and then finished third to Troy and Gay Mecene in the King George VI and Queen Elizabeth Stakes.

After a break of almost three months, Ela-Mana-Mou returned to the racecourse for the Champion Stakes at Newmarket, in which he failed to reproduce his best form when finishing sixth to Northern Baby. At the end of the season, he was sold for 500,000 guineas to the bloodstock agent Peter Wragg acting on behalf of Simon Weinstock and transferred to the stable of Dick Hern at West Ilsley. Willie Carson replaced Starkey as his regular jockey.

=== 1980: four-year-old season ===
On his four-year-old debut, Ela-Mana-Mou won for his new owner and trainer, taking the Group Three Earl of Sefton Stakes at Newmarket in April. He was found to be jarred up afterwards, and Peter Wragg subsequently discovered that the horse's neck and shoulders had been regularly treated by a physiotherapist, Pam Leadham, while he was at Harwood's stable. Hern engaged her to continue treating to the horse at his yard. He also determined that he would not be able to run Ela-Mana-Mou on firm ground.

At Royal Ascot in June, Ela-Mana-Mou added a victory in the Prince of Wales's Stakes, which was then a Group Two race. In the Group One Eclipse Stakes at Sandown Park Racecourse in July, he was pitted against Sea Chimes, an improving horse who recently won the Coronation Cup. Ela-Mana-Mou produced a "typically dogged and determined performance" to win from the Henry Cecil-trained three-year-old Hello Gorgeous and the Irish colt Gregorian, with Sea Chimes unplaced. Later in the month, he returned to the one and a half mile distance for the first time in a year when he contested Britain's most prestigious all-aged race, the King George VI and Queen Elizabeth Stakes at Ascot, for which he was made second favourite behind the French colt Le Marmot. Ridden by Carson, Ela-Mana-Mou took the lead four furlongs from the finish and held the strong late challenge of the Prix de Diane winner Mrs Penny by three-quarters of a length.

After a break of more than two months, Ela-Mana-Mou started 2/1 favourite for the Prix de l'Arc de Triomphe at Longchamp. In a closely contested finish, the British colt finished third behind the French three-year-olds Detroit and Argument after leading until the final 100m. The ground at Longchamp was firmer than usual for the time of year, and Hern fitted Ela-Mana-Mou with rubber undershoes to help take some jar out of the ground, but he was still unable to run as freely as possible. Following his run in the Arc, Ela-Mana-Mou was retired to stud with a valuation of £3.2M.

== Assessment ==
Ela-Mana-Mou was rated the best older horse in Europe in 1980 and the equal second-best overall, one pound behind the three-year-old sprinter Moorestyle. He was given a Timeform rating of 132: a rating of 130 is considered the rating of an above-average European Group One winner.

== Stud record ==
Ela-Mana-Mou was a successful stallion and was particularly important as an influence for stamina. His progeny included major winners such as Snurge, Double Trigger, Sumayr (Grand Prix de Paris), Almaarad, Emmson, Ela Romara (Nassau Stakes), Double Eclipse (Lonsdale Cup), The Little Thief (Prix de Lutèce) and Anna of Saxony (Park Hill Stakes).

Ela-Mana-Mou was based throughout his stud career at the Simmonstown division of the County Kildare-based Airlie Stud. He was euthanized in his paddock at Airlie on 6 August 2008 at the "grand old age" of thirty-two.

== Pedigree ==
Pedigree of Ela-Mana-Mou (IRE), bay stallion, 1976
Sire Pitcairn (IRE) 1971	Petingo (GB); 1965	Petition	Fair Trial
Sire Pitcairn (IRE) 1971	Petingo (GB); 1965	Petition	Art Paper
Sire Pitcairn (IRE) 1971	Petingo (GB); 1965	Alcazar	Alycidon
Sire Pitcairn (IRE) 1971	Petingo (GB); 1965	Alcazar	Quarterdeck
Sire Pitcairn (IRE) 1971	Border Bounty (GB); 1965	Bounteous	Rockefella
Sire Pitcairn (IRE) 1971	Border Bounty (GB); 1965	Bounteous	Marie Elizabeth
Sire Pitcairn (IRE) 1971	Border Bounty (GB); 1965	B Flat	Chanteur
Sire Pitcairn (IRE) 1971	Border Bounty (GB); 1965	B Flat	Ardeen
Dam Rose Bertin (GB) 1970	High Hat (GB); 1957	Hyperion	Gainsborough
Dam Rose Bertin (GB) 1970	High Hat (GB); 1957	Hyperion	Selene
Dam Rose Bertin (GB) 1970	High Hat (GB); 1957	Madonna	Donatello
Dam Rose Bertin (GB) 1970	High Hat (GB); 1957	Madonna	Women's Legion
Dam Rose Bertin (GB) 1970	Wide Awake (GB); 1964	Major Portion	Court Martial
Dam Rose Bertin (GB) 1970	Wide Awake (GB); 1964	Major Portion	Better Half
Dam Rose Bertin (GB) 1970	Wide Awake (GB); 1964	Wake Island	Relic
Dam Rose Bertin (GB) 1970	Wide Awake (GB); 1964	Wake Island	Alor Star (Family:3-g)
