= Mick O'Toole =

Irish racehorse trainer

Personal information
- Born: 18 September 1931 Dublin, Ireland
- Died: 23 August 2018 (aged 86) Dublin, Ireland
- Occupations: Racehorse trainer; Greyhound trainer

Horse racing career
- Sport: Horse racing

Major racing wins
- Horse racing: Cheltenham Gold Cup (1977); Irish 2,000 Guineas (1979); Eclipse Stakes (1979); Greyhound racing Oaks (1965)

Significant horses
- Davy Lad, Dickens Hill

Mick O'Toole (18 September 1931 – 23 August 2018) was an Irish racehorse trainer, whose horses competed in both Flat racing and National Hunt racing, and was active from 1966 to 1996, winning major races both in Ireland and Great Britain during the course of his career.

== Greyhound racing ==
Born in Dublin, O'Toole began his training career with greyhounds and won the 1965 Oaks with a greyhound called Marjone.

== Horse racing ==
O'Toole became a horse trainer at Phoenix Park Racecourse from 1966 to 1968 before moving to Maddenstown at the Curragh where he trained until his retirement in 1996. His most significant victory was winning the 1977 Cheltenham Gold Cup with Davy Lad and he also gained important Flat racing success with Dickens Hill who won the 1979 Irish 2000 Guineas and Eclipse Stakes. He was leading trainer in Ireland on races won in 1971 with 56 winners.
