= Michelozzo (horse) =

American-bred Thoroughbred racehorse

- Sire: Northern Baby
- Grandsire: Northern Dancer
- Dam: Tres Agreable
- Damsire: Luthier
- Sex: Stallion
- Foaled: 1986
- Country: United States
- Colour: Bay
- Breeder: Charles Rowe
- Owner: Charles A. B. St. George
- Trainer: Henry Cecil
- Record: 17: 4-2-3
- Earnings: £not found

Major wins
- March Stakes (1989); St. Leger Stakes (1989)

Michelozzo (foaled 1986 in the United States) is a retired British Thoroughbred racehorse best known for winning the 1989 Classic St. Leger Stakes (run that year at Ayr because the Doncaster course was deemed unsafe due to subsidence) under jockey Steve Cauthen. Raced by Charles A. B. St-George, who had owned the great Ardross, Michelozzo was trained by Henry Cecil.
