= Law Society (horse) =

American-bred Thoroughbred racehorse

- Sire: Alleged
- Grandsire: Hoist the Flag
- Dam: Bold Bikini
- Damsire: Boldnesian
- Sex: Stallion
- Foaled: 16 February 1982
- Country: United States
- Colour: Dark Bay or Brown
- Breeder: William Stamps Farish III
- Owner: Stavros Niarchos
- Trainer: Vincent O'Brien
- Record: 8: 5-2-0

Major wins
- Anglesey Stakes (1984); National Stakes (1984); Chester Vase (1985); Irish Derby (1985)

Awards
- Timeform rating: 129 (1984), 130 (1985); Timeform joint-top-rated two-year-old (1984); Top-rated Irish-trained two-year-old colt (1984); Top-rated Irish-trained racehorse (1985)

Law Society (16 February 1982 – 7 March 2011) was an American-bred, Irish-trained Thoroughbred racehorse and sire. In a racing career which lasted from August 1984 until July 1985 he won five of his eight races and was rated among the best of his generation in Europe in both years. As a two-year-old he won the Anglesey Stakes and the National Stakes in Ireland before being narrowly defeated in the Dewhurst Stakes. In the following year he won the Chester Vase and finished second in The Derby before recording his biggest win when defeating a strong international field in the Irish Derby. He was retired from racing at the end of his three-year-old season and stood as a breeding stallion in Ireland and Germany with some success. Law Society died in 2011 at the age of twenty-nine.

== Background ==
Law Society was a strongly-built, good-looking brown horse with a small white star bred at the Lane's End Farm in Versailles, Kentucky by William Stamps Farish III. He was sired by the dual Prix de l'Arc de Triomphe winner Alleged out of the mare Bold Bikini. Alleged was a successful stallion, and a strong influence for stamina: his best winners included Miss Alleged, Shantou, Legal Case and Midway Lady. Bold Bikini won six races and had previously produced the Breeders' Futurity winner Strike Your Colours. In July 1983, Law Society was sent as a yearling to the sales at Keeneland where he bought for $2,700,000 by representatives of BBA (Ireland) acting on behalf of Stavros Niarchos. He was then sent to Europe to be trained by Vincent O'Brien at Ballydoyle.

== Racing career ==
=== 1984: two-year-old season ===
Law Society began his racing career in a maiden race over six furlongs at the Curragh Racecourse on 18 August. He took the lead one and a half furlongs from the finish and won by two and a half lengths from My Regrets and nine others. At the time his success drew little coverage, as attention was focused on his better regarded stable companion Father Matthew who ran unsuccessfully in the Tyros Stakes on the same card. Two weeks after his debut win, Law Society was moved up in class to contest the Group Three Anglesey Stakes over the same course and distance. He disputed the lead from the start and won by a length from Kamakura. In late September, the colt was moved up in class and distance for the Group One National Stakes over seven furlongs at the Curragh. He started the odds-on favourite against eight opponents and won by half a length from Concert Hall with Kamakura three lengths back in third place.

In October, Law Society was sent to the United Kingdom to contest Britain's most prestigious two-year-old race, the Dewhurst Stakes over seven furlong at Newmarket Racecourse. Ridden by Pat Eddery, he started favourite with his main rivals appearing to be the Mill Reef Stakes winner Local Suitor and the Prix de la Salamandre winner Noblequest. Law Society moved up to contest the lead a quarter of a mile finish and was soon engaged in a three-way struggle with Local Suitor and the 20/1 outsider Kala Dancer. Eddery struggled to keep the favourite straight in the closing stages and he was beaten a head by Kala Dancer, with Local Suitor a head away in third.

=== 1985: three-year-old season ===
Law Society did not thrive in the early part of 1985 and appeared to be less than fully fit when he made his seasonal debut in the Chester Vase, a trial race for the Epsom Derby at Chester Racecourse on 7 May. He was O'Brien's first runner in the race since Boucher ran poorly in 1972. Law Society disputed the lead from half way and was left in front after Miller's Mate pulled up injured in the straight, going on to win by two and a half lengths from Petoski.

Four weeks after his win at Chester, Law Society was one of fourteen colts to contest the 206th running of the Derby at Epsom Downs Racecourse. Ridden by Eddery, he started the 5/1 third favourite behind Slip Anchor and Shadeed. Law Society was in fifth place on the turn into the straight and moved into second place early into the straight but had no chance of catching Slip Anchor, who had gone clear of the field just after half way. He finished second, seven lengths behind Slip Anchor and six lengths clear of Damister who finished third. Law Society's next race was the Irish Derby over one and a half miles at the Curragh on 29 June. He started 15/8 favourite in an international field which included Damister, Theatrical, Triptych, Mouktar (winner of the Prix du Jockey Club) and Baillamont (winner of the Prix Jean Prat). Eddery settled Law Society in the middle of the field but was blocked when attempting to move the colt forward and was forced to switch to the outside in the straight. The favourite produced a strong late run and despite hanging to the right in the closing stages, he caught Theatrical inside the final hundred yards and won by half a length. After the race O'Brien commented "Law Society has come on a lot since Epsom, although the faster Curragh ground certainly helped him."

Law Society returned to England in July for the King George VI and Queen Elizabeth Stakes at Ascot Racecourse, where he was matched against older horses for the first time and started second favourite behind the filly Oh So Sharp. Eddery tracked the leaders but was unable to make any significant progress in the straight and finished fourth behind Petoski, Oh So Sharp and Rainbow Quest. Law Society was then aimed at the Phoenix Champion Stakes in September but sustained an injury to his right foreleg in training and never raced again.

== Assessment ==
In 1984, the independent Timeform organisation gave Law Society a rating of 129, making him their equal top-rated two-year-old alongside Kala Dancer, while the official International Classification ranked him second behind the same colt. As a three-year-old, Law Society was given a Timeform rating of 130, six pounds behind Slip Anchor. In the International Classification he was the top-rated horse of any age trained in Ireland and the seventh highest-rated horse in Europe behind Slip Anchor, Petoski, Rainbow Quest, Sagace, Pebbles and Shadeed.

== Stud record ==
Law Society was retired from racing to become a breeding stallion at the Coolmore Stud in Ireland. He was later sold and moved to the Isarland Stud in Germany. He had some success as a sire of winners, with the best of his progeny including:

- Anzillero (bay colt, foaled 1987), won Deutschland-Preis
- Approach the Bench (bay colt, foaled 1988), won Eddie Read Handicap
- Fortune's Wheel (bay colt, foaled 1988), won Prix d'Harcourt
- Homme de Loi (bay colt, foaled 1988), won Grand Prix de Paris
- Right Win (bay colt, foaled 1990), won Gordon Stakes, Gran Premio d'Italia, John Porter Stakes, Gallinule Stakes, Tolworth Hurdle
- Court of Honour (bay colt, foaled 1992), won Gran Premio del Jockey Club
- Catch Me (brown gelding, foaled 2002), won Hatton's Grace Hurdle

Horses bred from Law Society mares include British Classic Race winners Love Divine and Scorpion as well as the Japanese champion Manhattan Cafe.

Law Society was retired from breeding in 2008 and died in Germany on 7 March 2011 at the age of twenty-nine.

== Pedigree ==
Pedigree of Law Society (USA), dark bay or brown stallion, 1982
Sire Alleged (USA) 1974	Hoist The Flag (USA); 1968	Tom Rolfe	Ribot
Sire Alleged (USA) 1974	Hoist The Flag (USA); 1968	Tom Rolfe	Pocahontas
Sire Alleged (USA) 1974	Hoist The Flag (USA); 1968	Wavy Navy	War Admiral*
Sire Alleged (USA) 1974	Hoist The Flag (USA); 1968	Wavy Navy	Triomphe
Sire Alleged (USA) 1974	Princess Pout (USA); 1966	Prince John	Princequillo
Sire Alleged (USA) 1974	Princess Pout (USA); 1966	Prince John	Not Afraid
Sire Alleged (USA) 1974	Princess Pout (USA); 1966	Determined Lady	Determine
Sire Alleged (USA) 1974	Princess Pout (USA); 1966	Determined Lady	Tumbling*
Dam Bold Bikini (USA) 1969	Boldnesian (USA); 1963	Bold Ruler	Nasrullah
Dam Bold Bikini (USA) 1969	Boldnesian (USA); 1963	Bold Ruler	Miss Disco
Dam Bold Bikini (USA) 1969	Boldnesian (USA); 1963	Alanesian	Polynesian
Dam Bold Bikini (USA) 1969	Boldnesian (USA); 1963	Alanesian	Alablue
Dam Bold Bikini (USA) 1969	Ran-Tan (USA); 1960	Summer Tan	Heliopolis
Dam Bold Bikini (USA) 1969	Ran-Tan (USA); 1960	Summer Tan	Miss Zibby
Dam Bold Bikini (USA) 1969	Ran-Tan (USA); 1960	Mehrabi	Migoli
Dam Bold Bikini (USA) 1969	Ran-Tan (USA); 1960	Mehrabi	Majideh (Family:5-e)

* Law Society is inbred 4S x 5S to the stallion War Admiral, meaning that he appears fourth generation and fifth generation (via Tumbling) on the sire side of his pedigree.
