= Tap On Wood =

Irish-bred Thoroughbred racehorse

- Sire: Sallust
- Grandsire: Pall Mall
- Dam: Cat O' Mountaine
- Damsire: Ragusa
- Sex: Stallion
- Foaled: 15 February 1976
- Country: Ireland
- Colour: Chestnut
- Breeder: Irish National Stud
- Owner: Anthony Shead
- Trainer: Barry Hills
- Record: 18: 10-2-1

Major wins
- National Stakes (1978); Thirsk Classic Trial (1979); 2000 Guineas (1979); Kiveton Park Stakes (1979)

Awards
- Timeform rating: 113 (1978), 130 (1979)

Tap On Wood (15 February 1976 – 25 December 1999) was an Irish-bred British-trained Thoroughbred racehorse and sire best known for winning the classic 2000 Guineas in 1979. As a two-year-old in 1978 he won seven of his thirteen races including the National Stakes. In the following spring he defeated the outstanding miler Kris to record an upset victory in the Guineas. His later career was disrupted by illness and he appeared in only two more races, finishing unplaced in the Derby and winning the Kiveton Park Stakes. He subsequently had some success as a breeding stallion in Europe and Japan.

== Background ==
Tap On Wood was a chestnut horse with no white markings bred by the Irish National Stud. He was from the third crop of foals sired by Sallust an outstanding miler who won the Sussex Stakes and the Prix du Moulin in 1972. Sallust also sired the filly Sanedtki, whose wins included the Prix de la Forêt, Prix du Moulin. Tap On Wood's dam, Cat o' Mountaine was a half-sister of the Dewhurst Stakes winner Bounteous and a great granddaughter of the broodmare Bayora, whose other descendants included the 1000 Guineas winner Rose Royale.

As a yearling, Tap On Wood was sent to the sales and was bought for 12,500 guineas. During his racing career he was owned by Tony Shead and trained by Barry Hills at Lambourn in Berkshire.

== Racing career ==
=== 1978: two-year-old season ===
Tap On Wood had an unusually active two-year-old season for a top-class European racehorse: by September he had already run ten times and won six races at distances from five to seven furlongs. He was ridden in most of his races that year by the British jockey Ernie Johnson. He won the Donnington Castle Stakes at Newbury Racecourse but his other successes came against moderate opposition. On his tenth start he was beaten when attempting to concede nine pounds by Warmington in the Heronslea Stakes at Ayr Racecourse. On his next appearance the colt was sent to Ireland to contest the Group Two National Stakes over seven furlongs at the Curragh. Tap On Wood took the lead approaching the final furlong and held off the challenge of Dickens Hill to win by a head with Sandy Creek (subsequent winner of the William Hill Futurity) in third place. His win was only confirmed after the racecourse stewards overruled an objection by the rider of the runner-up who claimed that Tap On Wood had caused interference by hanging to the right in the closing stages. Tap On Wood was sent to France and moved up to Group One Class for the Grand Critérium at Longchamp Racecourse on 8 October. He started a 21/1 outsider and finished sixth of the twelve runners, six lengths behind the winner Irish River. On his final appearance of the year he was well-beaten when finishing sixth behind Kris in the Horris Hill Stakes at Newbury.

=== 1979: three-year-old season ===
Tap On Wood began his second season in April at Salisbury Racecourse where he finished a well-beaten fourth behind Lake City in the 2000 Guineas Trial. Two weeks later, the colt was sent to Yorkshire to contest the Timeform Racecard Stakes over one mile at Thirsk Racecourse and won by half a length from the filly Abbeydale. The form of his win was boosted when Abbeydale finished second to One In A Million in the 1000 Guineas. On 5 May, Tap On Wood started a 20/1 outsider in a field of 20 runners for the 171st running of the 2000 Guineas over the Rowley Mile course at Newmarket Racecourse. The favourite for the race was Kris, who had won the Greenham Stakes on his seasonal debut, while Lyphard's Wish, who had defeated the previous year's champion two-year-old Tromos in the Craven Stakes was also strongly fancied. Ridden by the American jockey Steve Cauthen, Tap On Wood raced towards the back of the field before moving up to contest the lead with three furlongs left to run. In the closing stages three colts drew clear of the field, with Tap On Wood challenged by Kris on the rails to his right and Young Generation on his left. In what Timeform described as "a memorable finish" Tap On Wood prevailed by half a length from Kris, with Young Generation a short head away in third place, giving Cauthen his first win in a British classic race. Cauthen would go on to win a total of ten British classic races in his career.

On 6 June, Tap On Wood was moved up in distance to contest the 200th Derby Stakes over one and a half miles at Epsom Downs Racecourse. He was never in serious contention and finished twelfth of the twenty-three runners behind Troy. Cauthen reported that the colt was never going well at any stage of the race. Shortly after the Derby, Tap On Wood was found to be suffering from a viral infection and was off the course for the next three months. During this period the form of his 2000 Guineas win was boosted: Kris won the St James's Palace Stakes, Sussex Stakes and Celebration Mile while Young Generation who had defeated older horses the Lockinge Stakes in May, traveled to France to take the Prix Jean Prat.

Tap On Wood returned in the Kiveton Park Stakes at Doncaster Racecourse in September for which he was required to carry a ten-pound weight penalty for his classic win. Starting at odds of 11/4 he looked impressive before the race and won convincingly by a length and one and a half lengths from R B Chesne and Alert. Tap On Wood was scheduled to meet Kris for a third time in the Queen Elizabeth II Stakes at Ascot later that month but he suffered a recurrence of the viral infection and did not race again.

== Assessment ==
In 1978, the independent Timeform organisation described Tap On Wood as "a thoroughly likeable individual" and awarded him a rating of 113, twenty-one pounds below their top-rated two-year-old Tromos. In the Free Handicap, a ranking of the best two-year-olds to race in Britain, the colt was given a weight of 118 pounds, fifteen pounds inferior to Tromos. In 1979, Tap On Wood was rated 130 by Timeform, five pounds below Kris and seven below the leading three-year-old Troy. He was described in their annual Racehorses of 1979 as having shown "outstanding toughness and generosity and the ability to act on any type of going". In the International Classification, he was rated the seventh best three-year-old colt in Europe behind Troy, Le Marmot, Irish River, Kris, Bellypha and Dickens Hill.

In their book, A Century of Champions, based on the Timeform rating system, John Randall and Tony Morris rated Tap On Wood an "average" winner of the 2000 Guineas.

== Stud record ==
At the end of his three-year-old season, Tap On Wood was syndicated at a value of £1 million and retired to stand as a breeding stallion at the Kildangan Stud in County Kildare. He was later exported to stand in Japan. The best of his offspring was Kyoei Tap, a filly who won the Queen Elizabeth II Commemorative Cup in 1990. Other good winners included Nisnas (Great Voltigeur Stakes), Royal Touch (Grosser Preis von Düsseldorf), From The Wood (Concorde Stakes), Ozopulmin (Criterium Nazionale), Miss Boniface (Ribblesdale Stakes), Mahogany (Fred Darling Stakes), Sedulous (Killavullan Stakes), Ibadiyya (Prix Chloé), Rappa Tap Tap (Blue Seal Stakes) and Knock Knock (18 wins including the Chesterfield Cup). His last foals were born in 1999. He was reported to have died on 25 December 1999 by the Japanese Stud Book.

== Pedigree ==
Pedigree of Tap On Wood (IRE), chestnut stallion, 1976
Sire Sallust (GB) 1969	Pall Mall (IRE); 1955	Palestine	Fair Trial
Sire Sallust (GB) 1969	Pall Mall (IRE); 1955	Palestine	Una
Sire Sallust (GB) 1969	Pall Mall (IRE); 1955	Malapert	Portlaw
Sire Sallust (GB) 1969	Pall Mall (IRE); 1955	Malapert	Malatesta
Sire Sallust (GB) 1969	Bandarilla (GB); 1960	Matador	Golden Cloud
Sire Sallust (GB) 1969	Bandarilla (GB); 1960	Matador	Spanish Galantry
Sire Sallust (GB) 1969	Bandarilla (GB); 1960	Interval	Jamaica Inn
Sire Sallust (GB) 1969	Bandarilla (GB); 1960	Interval	Second Act
Dam Cat O'Mountaine (GB) 1967	Ragusa (IRE); 1960	Ribot	Tenerani
Dam Cat O'Mountaine (GB) 1967	Ragusa (IRE); 1960	Ribot	Romanella
Dam Cat O'Mountaine (GB) 1967	Ragusa (IRE); 1960	Fantan	Ambiorix
Dam Cat O'Mountaine (GB) 1967	Ragusa (IRE); 1960	Fantan	Red Eye
Dam Cat O'Mountaine (GB) 1967	Marie Elizabeth (IRE); 1948	Mazarin	Mieuxce
Dam Cat O'Mountaine (GB) 1967	Marie Elizabeth (IRE); 1948	Mazarin	Boiarinia
Dam Cat O'Mountaine (GB) 1967	Marie Elizabeth (IRE); 1948	Miss Honor	Mr Jinks
Dam Cat O'Mountaine (GB) 1967	Marie Elizabeth (IRE); 1948	Miss Honor	Bayora (Family: 14-f)
