= Three Troikas =

French Thoroughbred racehorse (b. 1976)

- Sire: Lyphard
- Grandsire: Northern Dancer
- Dam: Three Roses
- Damsire: Dual
- Sex: Filly
- Foaled: 1976
- Country: France
- Colour: Bay
- Breeder: Artur Pfaff
- Owner: Ghislaine Head
- Trainer: Criquette Head
- Record: ?: 7-5-?
- Earnings: F3,549,000

Major wins
- Prix Vanteaux (1979); Poule d'Essai des Pouliches (1979); Prix Saint-Alary (1979); Prix Vermeille (1979); Prix de l'Arc de Triomphe (1979); Prix d'Harcourt (1980)

Awards
- Top-rated European three-year-old (1979); Timeform Top-rated three-year-old filly (1979); Top-rated Older mare in France (1980); Timeform rating: 133

Honours
- Three Troikas Stakes at Turffontein Racecourse
- Last updated on 26 September 2023

Three Troikas (foaled 1976) was a French Thoroughbred champion racehorse owned, trained and raced by three members of the famous Head family. The highlight of her career came in the 1979 Prix de l'Arc de Triomphe, where she defeated the Derby winner Troy. She was crowned European champion three-year-old the same year.

== Early life ==
Three Troikas' sire, Lyphard had been a very talented miler for Alec Head, winning the Prix de la Forêt and Prix Jacques Le Marois but he had not handled the unique course or the trip when attempting The Derby at Epsom in 1972.

Her dam was the Irish mare, Three Roses which was foaled in County Limerick and trained on The Curragh by Mick Connolly. She was by the unfashionable sire Dual, who stood for 48 guineas and whose chief attraction lay in him being out of a half sister to Meld. Despite being a big filly, Three Roses had a very busy juvenile career in Ireland, winning two races including the Park Stakes at the Phoenix Park and placing seven times including running second in the Patriotic Nursery at Baldoyle.

The mating which resulted in Three Troikas was planned based on the physical compatibility of sire and dam with the diminutive Lyphard mated to the big, well-made Three Roses. The progeny was a bay filly which was purchased as a yearling by Alec Head's Haras du Quesnay at Tattersalls, Newmarket for 41,000gns from her breeder, the South African construction magnate Artur Pfaff.

The filly would be named Three Troikas, and would go on to race in the colours of Head's wife Ghislaine. She would be trained by their daughter Criquette at Chantilly, and would be ridden by their son Freddy.

== Racing career ==
Three Troikas won her only start at two in November 1978 at Longchamp under Head.

Racing as a three-year-old, Three Troikas began the season with an impressive three-length win over Dunette in the Prix Vanteaux at Longchamp on April 16. A fortnight later she defeated Nonoalco when landing the Poule d'Essai des Pouliches at Longchamp. In the Prix Saint-Alary, again at Longchamp, she set a new course record which had been held by Solitude since 1961 when defeating Pitasia with the free-running Dunette only fifth.

Three Troikas was next saddled for the Prix de Diane at Chantilly. It poured rain throughout the day and the filly did not appear to move easily on the going. Having seen off Nonoalco and Producer at the 200 metre mark she was caught on the line by the late challenge of Dunette, going down by a nose. Criquette believed the defeat may have been caused by a bruised foot. Rested until the Prix Vermeille on September 16, Three Troikas was opposed by Epsom Oaks winner Scintillate. Intent on not giving her a hard race before the Arc, Head did not push the filly out close home and she had only a short head to spare over Pitasia, when she could certainly have won by much more. Scintillate finished a disappointing ninth.

== Prix de l'Arc de Triomphe ==
Having already had a fine season, Three Troikas was among the fancies for the 1979 Prix de l'Arc de Triomphe. The British colt Troy, who had won the Derby in such an easy fashion, was destined however to go off hot favourite at odds of 8/10 on the Pari-Mutuel, coupled with his pacemakers Player and Rivadon. Three Troikas was 88/10 fourth choice coupled with the Head-owned Fabulous Dancer. A crowd of 34,182, swelled by a great number of English visitors, flocked to see the end-of-season finale.

Troy looked well in the paddock, as did Three Troikas and Le Marmot. Major Dick Hern said before the race that Troy was as well as he had been for the Derby. Criqette Head reported that Three Troikas had been particularly satisfactory in a piece of work with Gay Mecene (second to Troy in the King George) and Fabulous Dancer.

Troy's pacemaker Rivadon set the early pace while Three Troikas tacked across to the inside rail from a high draw. Crimson Beau then surprisingly went into a long lead ahead of Troy's pacemakers. Top Ville began to struggle as they entered the straight while Three Troikas loomed on the outside going very easily. The French filly went on to win going away by three lengths from Le Marmot and a staying on Troy. The victory was a triumph for the Head family and made Criquette Head the first, and still only, woman in history to train an Arc winner. Three Troikas' 1979 performance made her the highest-rated three-year-old in Europe in the International Classification.

== Champion Older Mare ==
At age four, during an injury-interrupted campaign Three Troikas enjoyed some success, winning the Prix d'Harcourt at Longchamp in April. She was then beaten by Le Marmot in the Ganay before injuring a metacarpal bone in her off-fore foot when running third behind Northern Baby and Strong Gale in the Prix Dollar and running a creditable fourth behind Detroit in the Arc. Taken to Aqueduct for the Turf Classic, Three Troikas could not handle the exceptionally heavy going and finished last. This injury-blighted campaign was nonetheless enough for her to be crowned Champion Older Mare in Europe in 1980.

== Stud record ==
Madame Alec Head sold the mare privately to an American syndicate in 1981 which involved Overbrook Stud. She was covered the same year by Exclusive Native. She threw a chestnut filly to this mating before suffering three covering seasons without offspring. In 1991 however, she foaled a brown filly by Halo, named Three Angels that showed a semblance of her dam's own brilliance, winning the Gr. 3 Prix Des Reservoirs at Longchamp and running-up in the Gr.1 Prix Saint-Alary. In a generally disappointing stud career, her best progeny were thrown to the Hail To Reason stallion, Halo, from which she threw three winners and two stakes performers.
