= Troy (horse) =

Irish-bred, British-trained Thoroughbred racehorse

- Racing colours of Michael Sobell and Arnold Weinstock
- Sire: Petingo
- Grandsire: Petition
- Dam: La Milo
- Damsire: Hornbeam
- Sex: Stallion
- Foaled: 25 March 1976
- Died: 12 May 1983 (aged 7)
- Country: Ireland
- Colour: Bay
- Breeder: Ballymacoll Stud
- Owner: Sir Michael Sobell & Lord Weinstock
- Trainer: Dick Hern
- Record: 11: 8-2-1
- Earnings: £450,494

Major wins
- Vintage Stakes (1978); Sandown Classic Trial (1979); Predominate Stakes (1979); Epsom Derby (1979); Irish Derby (1979); K. George VI & Q. Elizabeth Stakes (1979); Benson and Hedges Gold Cup (1979)

Awards
- Timeform Horse of the Year (1979); Timeform Best Middle-distance horse (1979); Gilbey Champion Racehorse of the Year; Gilbey Middle Distance Champion; British Horse of the Year (1979); Timeform rating: 137
- Last updated on 23 August 2022

Troy (25 March 1976 – 12 May 1983) was an Irish-bred, British-trained Thoroughbred racehorse and sire. In a career that lasted from 1978 to 1979, he ran eleven times and won eight races. He is most notable for his form in the summer of 1979, when he won the 200th running of the Derby and subsequently added victories in the Irish Derby, the King George VI and Queen Elizabeth Stakes and the Benson and Hedges Gold Cup. He was retired to stud at the end of the season. His career as a stallion lasted only four years before he died in 1983.

== Background ==
Troy, a big, powerfully built bay horse with three white socks, was bred in County Meath, Ireland, by the Ballymacoll Stud, the breeding operation of his owners, industrialist Sir Michael Sobell and his son-in-law Lord Weinstock. He was sired by Petingo, the leading English two-year-old of 1967, and was out of the mare La Milo. La Milo had previously produced Washington D. C. International winner Admetus. Troy was sent into training with Dick Hern at West Ilsley in Berkshire.

== Racing career ==
=== 1978: two-year-old season ===
Troy made his racecourse debut in summer of 1978, wearing the light blue silks of his owners, when he finished second in a six furlong maiden race. In his next start, he moved up in distance for the Plantation Maiden Stakes over seven furlongs at Newmarket Racecourse in June and won by two lengths from Warmington. He was then moved up in class for the Listed Vintage Stakes at Goodwood Racecourse in July. Starting at odds of 2/1 he was restrained by Carson at the rear of the six-runner field before taking the lead in the final furlong and winning by two and a half lengths from Ela-Mana-Mou.

Troy was again moved up in class and distance for his final start of the year in the Group Two Royal Lodge Stakes, over one mile at Ascot Racecourse in September. He chased the leader Lyphard's Wish before taking the lead a furlong from the finish but was overtaken in the closing stages and was beaten three quarters of a length by Ela-Mana-Mou.

=== 1979: three-year-old season ===
==== Spring ====
In the spring of 1979, Troy was prepared for the Epsom Derby by running in two of the recognised trial races. In early May, he ran in the Classic Trial Stakes over ten furlongs at Sandown. He started the 4/7 favourite but looked less than fully fit and was not particularly impressive as he "scrambled" home to win by a neck from Two of Diamonds. The form was made to look somewhat better when Two of Diamonds won the Dee Stakes at Chester Racecourse. Later in the month, he was moved up in distance for the mile and a half Predominate Stakes at Goodwood. He took the lead approaching the final furlong and drew right away from his opponents without being put under any pressure and won by seven lengths Serge Lifar and Galaxy Libra. At the time it was felt that, while he had won the race impressively, he had beaten mediocre opposition, but Serge Lifar went on to win the Scottish Derby, whilst Galaxy Libra became a leading turf performer in the United States, winning the Sunset Handicap and the Man o' War Stakes in 1981.

==== Summer ====
In the 200th Derby on 6 June, Troy started third favourite behind Milford and Ela-Mana-Mou at odds of 6/1 in a field of twenty-three runners. Milford, also trained by Hern, was owned by the Queen and was popular with the public, but had been passed over by stable jockey Willie Carson in favour of Troy. Carson held Troy up in the early stages and entered the straight in thirteenth place behind the front-running Lyphard's Wish. Carson moved Troy to the outside, where he produced a strong run to take the lead a furlong and a half from the finish. In the closing stages, he drew away to win by seven lengths from Dickens Hill with Northern Baby in third ahead of Ela-Mana-Mou. The unplaced horses included Cracaval, Niniski, Son of Love and Tap On Wood. The form of the race was particularly strong: Dickens Hill won the Eclipse Stakes in July; Cracaval upset Ile de Bourbon in the September Stakes and Northern Baby won the Champion Stakes in October. Michael Sobell called the result "the culmination of twenty years of ownership", while Carson described Troy as "the best colt I have ever ridden."

At the end of the June, Troy contested the Irish Derby at the Curragh in which he was reopposed by Dickens Hill, with the other runners including the French challengers Scorpio and the undefeated Fabulous Dancer. After turning into the straight in fifth place behind the Irish-trained outsider The Bart he took the lead approaching the final furlong and won by four lengths from Dickens Hill, Bohemian Grove, Scorpio and The Bart. In July, Troy raced against older horses for the first time in the King George VI and Queen Elizabeth Stakes at Ascot. His task was made easier by the absence of Ile de Bourbon, the 1978 winner, who was withdrawn after contracting a "virus". He started at odds of 2/5 with his main opposition looking likely to come from the French four-year-old Gay Mecene. Troy raced in fourth place before moving up to overtake Ela-Mana-Mou in the straight and held the late challenge of Gay Mecene to win by 1 1/2 lengths, with Ela-Mana-Mou holding on to take third ahead of M-Lolshan. He became the fourth horse after Nijinsky, Grundy and The Minstrel to complete the Derby-Irish Derby-King George treble. His performance was described as "workmanlike" and "unspectacular" with Timeform commenting that he was almost certainly unsuited by the relatively slow early pace. At York in August, Troy was brought back in distance for the Benson and Hedges Gold Cup over 10 1/2 furlongs and started the 1/2 favourite. He appeared outpaced in the early stages and was ten lengths behind the leaders Lyphard's Wish and Crimson Beau with three furlongs left to run. He produced a sustained run in the straight to take the lead inside the final furlong and was eased down in the final strides to win by three quarters of a length from Crimson Beau.

==== Autumn ====
Troy's final race was the Prix de l'Arc de Triomphe at Longchamp Racecourse on 7 October. He started the 4/5 favourite in a field of twenty-two runners which included Top Ville, Le Marmot, Three Troikas, Fabulous Dancer, Ile de Bourbon, Trillion, Crimson Beau, Two of Diamonds and Northern Baby. He was not far behind the leaders on the final turn, but his usual finishing run failed to materialse, and although he made some progress in the closing stages and finished third behind Three Troikas and Le Marmot. Timeform commented that Troy had failed to reproduce his best form, speculating that he had not recovered from his hard race at York.

== Assessment and honours ==
In the official International Classification for 1978, Troy was rated the tenth best two-year-old in Europe, seven pounds behind the top-rared Tromos. Troy was given a rating of 122 by the independent Timeform organisation, twelve pounds behind Tromos and was described in their annual Racehorses of 1978 as "just the type to develop into a high-class three-year-old". Troy was given an end of season rating of 137 by Timeform in 1979, the fourth highest awarded to a Derby winner up to that time, and was named their Horse of the Year. In the Gilbey Racing Awards, based on points accrued in major races Troy was named Champion Racehorse of the Year and Middle Distance Champion. The compilers of the International Classification was less impressed: he was named the best three-year-colt in Europe but was rated a pound behind Three Troikas. He was named British Horse of the Year for 1979 by the Racecourse Association, taking twenty-seven of the thirty-two votes.

In their book A Century of Champions, John Randall and Tony Morris rated Troy a "great" Derby winner and the sixteenth best British racehorse of the 20th Century.

Troy's third-place prize money from the Arc took his total earnings to £450,428, a record for a horse trained in Britain or Ireland, which stood for three years until it was surpassed by Glint of Gold.

== Stud career ==
Troy was syndicated by the Queen's manager of racing, Lord Porchester, for a then-record price of £7.2 million and retired to stallion duty at the Highclere Stud, Burghclere Newbury, Berkshire.in 1980.

In a very short career, Troy proved particularly successful as a sire of fillies and broodmares. He sired Helen Street, winner of the 1985 Irish Oaks and France's Prix du Calvados: Helen Street produced Street Cry, the sire of 2007 Kentucky Derby winner Street Sense. By another daughter, Sheer Audacity, Troy was also the damsire of the 1999 Epsom Derby winner, Oath. Troy also sired Walensee, who raced in France and won the 1985 Prix Vermeille and was voted that country's Champion 3-Year-Old Filly. She was the dam of Westerner, the 2004 and 2005 European Champion Stayer. Through another daughter, Cocotte, Troy was the damsire of Pilsudski, the 1997 European Champion Older Horse. Troy's son Tropular sired the Prix du Jockey Club winner Ragmar.

After only four seasons as a stallion, the seven-year-old Troy died at stud of an acute peritonitis on 12 May 1983 found by stablehand Carl Skelton. He is buried at Highclere Stud.

== Pedigree ==
Pedigree of Troy (IRE), bay stallion, 1976
Sire Petingo (GB) 1965	Petition (GB); 1944	Fair Trial	Fairway
Sire Petingo (GB) 1965	Petition (GB); 1944	Fair Trial	Lady Juror
Sire Petingo (GB) 1965	Petition (GB); 1944	Art Paper	Artists Proof
Sire Petingo (GB) 1965	Petition (GB); 1944	Art Paper	Quire
Sire Petingo (GB) 1965	Alcazar (FR); 1957	Alycidon	Donatello
Sire Petingo (GB) 1965	Alcazar (FR); 1957	Alycidon	Aurora
Sire Petingo (GB) 1965	Alcazar (FR); 1957	Quarterdeck	Nearco
Sire Petingo (GB) 1965	Alcazar (FR); 1957	Quarterdeck	Poker Chip
Dam La Milo (GB) 1963	Hornbeam (GB); 1953	Hyperion	Gainsborough
Dam La Milo (GB) 1963	Hornbeam (GB); 1953	Hyperion	Selene
Dam La Milo (GB) 1963	Hornbeam (GB); 1953	Thicket	Nasrullah
Dam La Milo (GB) 1963	Hornbeam (GB); 1953	Thicket	Thorn Wood
Dam La Milo (GB) 1963	Pin Prick (GB); 1955	Pinza	Chanteur
Dam La Milo (GB) 1963	Pin Prick (GB); 1955	Pinza	Pasqua
Dam La Milo (GB) 1963	Pin Prick (GB); 1955	Miss Winston	Royal Charger
Dam La Milo (GB) 1963	Pin Prick (GB); 1955	Miss Winston	East Wantleye (Family: 1-b)
