= Trillion (horse) =

American-bred Thoroughbred racehorse

- Sire: Hail To Reason
- Grandsire: Turn-To
- Dam: Margarethen
- Damsire: Tulyar
- Sex: Mare
- Foaled: 1974
- Country: United States
- Colour: Bay
- Breeder: Nelson Bunker Hunt
- Owner: Nelson Bunker Hunt & Edward L. Stephenson
- Trainer: Maurice Zilber
- Record: 31: 9-14-3
- Earnings: not found

Major wins
- Prix Minerve (1977); Prix de Royallieu (1977); Prix Ganay (1978); Prix Foy (1978); Prix Dollar (1978, 1979); Prix d'Harcourt (1979)

Awards
- French Champion Older Mare (1979); American Champion Female Turf Horse (1979)

Trillion (1974–1987) was a French Thoroughbred racing mare who was an Eclipse Award winner in the United States.

== Background ==
Bred in Kentucky by Texas oilman, Nelson Bunker Hunt, she was sired by Hail To Reason, the Leading sire in North America in 1970. Her dam, Margarethen, was a durable racing mare who won sixteen of sixty-four starts. Damsire Tulyar was an outstanding runner in England where his wins included the 1952 Epsom Derby, St. Leger Stakes, and King George VI and Queen Elizabeth Stakes.

Raced by Nelson Bunker Hunt in partnership with long-time friend Edward L. Stephenson of Warrenton, Virginia, Trillion regularly competed against males in both Europe and the United States.

== 1977 racing campaign ==
Trained by Maurice Zilber, in 1977 the three-year-old Trillion won the Group 3 Prix Minerve at Deauville-La Touques Racecourse and the Prix de Royallieu at Longchamp Racecourse in Paris. She notably finished second in two Group One races, the Prix Royal-Oak and Prix de Diane.

== 1978 racing campaign ==
Trillion had an outstanding year in 1978 when she won the Prix Foy, her first of two consecutive editions of the Prix Dollar, and the Group One Prix Ganay. She also had strong second-place performances in the Prix d'Ispahan, Grand Prix de Saint-Cloud and, ( her usual jockey Lester Piggott riding Alleged) she was ridden by American superstar jockey Bill Shoemaker, finished second behind winner Alleged in the Prix de l'Arc de Triomphe.

In late October Trillion was sent to compete in the United States. At Aqueduct Racetrack in New York City she ran third to winner Waya in the Turf Classic Invitational Stakes. In the November 4th Washington D.C. International Stakes at Laurel Park Racecourse in Maryland, she finished fourth to winner Mac Diarmida.

== 1979 racing campaign ==
Back in France for her five-year-old campaign, Trillion won the Prix d'Harcourt and her second straight Prix Dollar. She additionally earned seconds in the Prix Foy, Prix Ganay, and Prix du Prince d'Orange.

Returning to the United States in the fall of 1979, Trillion finished second to male horses in four Grade 1 races at distances of 1 1/2 to 1 5/8 miles (2.4 to 2.6 km). She was runner-up to Golden Act in the Canadian International Championship Stakes, to Bowl Game in both the Turf Classic Invitational Stakes, and the Washington D. C. International Stakes, and to Balzac in the Oak Tree Invitational Stakes at Santa Anita Park in California. Trillon's four strong showings against male horses on the turf earned her the 1979 Eclipse Award for American Champion Female Turf Horse.

== As a broodmare ==
Bred to Riverman, Trillion produced the outstanding racing mare Triptych who won nine Group One races in Europe. However, Trillion's broodmare career was cut short in 1987 when she died as a result of foaling complications.
