= Tromos =

British-bred Thoroughbred racehorse

- Sire: Busted
- Grandsire: Crepello
- Dam: Stilvi
- Damsire: Derring-Do
- Sex: Stallion
- Foaled: 10 March 1976
- Country: United Kingdom
- Colour: Chestnut
- Breeder: George Cambanis
- Owner: George Cambanis
- Trainer: Bruce Hobbs; Peter Howe
- Record: 6:2-1-1

Major wins
- Clarence House Stakes (1978); Dewhurst Stakes (1978)

Awards
- Top-rated European two-year-old (1978); Timeform best two-year-old (1978); Timeform rating: 134 (1978), 123 (1979)
- Last updated on 26 July 2022

Tromos (10 March 1976 – October 1982) was a British Thoroughbred racehorse and sire. In the autumn of 1978 he won the Clarence House Stakes by thirteen lengths and the Dewhurst Stakes by three. As a result of these performances he was rated the best two-year-old racehorse in Europe by both the independent Timeform organisation and the official International Classification. After being beaten in the Craven Stakes on his first run in 1979 he suffered from ill health and did not race again in Europe. He returned to racing as a four-year-old in the United States but was well beaten in both his races. Tromos was then retired to stud, but died only two years later.

== Background ==
Tromos was a "fine, big, rangy" flaxen chestnut colt with a broad white blaze and four white stockings bred by his owner George Cambanis. His dam Stilvi was bought by Cambanis as a yearling and became a top-class racehorse, winning the King George Stakes and Duke of York Stakes and an outstanding broodmare. Before Tromos, she had produced the Middle Park Stakes winner Tachypous and went on to produce the Irish Derby winner Tyrnavos and the Coronation Stakes winner Tolmi. Tromos is a Greek word meaning "a trembling or quaking with fear". The colt was sent into training with Bruce Hobbs at his Palace House stables in Newmarket and was ridden in his British races by the lightweight jockey John "Kipper" Lynch.

== Racing career ==
=== 1978: two-year-old season ===
Tromos made his racecourse debut in the Ribero Stakes over six furlongs at Doncaster Racecourse in September. He appeared to be less than fully fit, but showed some promise to finish third, beaten two lengths and a neck by Indian Brave and Sandford Boy. Twelve days later the colt was sent to Ascot Racecourse for the six furlong Clarence House Stakes. Tromos raced close to the lead before going clear of the field in the last quarter mile and drawing away to win by thirteen lengths from the Queen's colt Milford. Lynch said that he thought that something must have happened to the horses behind him as "everything had suddenly gone quiet". In October, Tromos was moved up in class and distance to contest the Group One Dewhurst Stakes, Britain's most prestigious race for two-year-olds over seven furlongs at Newmarket Racecourse. He started at odds of 11/4, making him third favourite in a field of six runners behind R B Chesne and More Light, who had finished first and second in the Champagne Stakes. Lynch sent the colt into the lead from the start and set a strong pace which soon had the other contenders under pressure. Two furlongs from the finish Tromos accelerated away from the field and won very impressively by an official margin of three lengths from More Light with Warminton in third (Timeform gave the winning distance as four lengths). Tromos went into the winter break as favourite for the following year's 2000 Guineas and Derby.

=== 1979: three-year-old season ===
Tromos began his three-year-old season at Newmarket in April when he started 30/100 favourite for the Craven Stakes, a trial race for the 2000 Guineas. His only two opponents, to whom he was conceding seven pounds, were Warminton and the Solario Stakes winner Lyphard's Wish. In contrast to the tactics previously employed on the colt, Lynch attempted to restrain the horse in the early stages. Tromos fought his jockey's attempts to hold him up and in the closing stages he never looked likely to catch the front-running Lyphard's Wish and finished second, beaten two and a half lengths. Shortly after the Craven, Tromos was diagnosed as suffering from a viral infection and did not race again in 1979.

Late in the year, Tromos was sold privately to the Kentucky-based Pillar Farm and exported to the United States.

=== 1980: four-year-old season ===
As a four-year-old, Tromos was trained in the United States by Peter M. Howe. He failed to recover his form, finishing unplaced in two allowance races at Belmont Park in June. He was ridden in his American races by Jorge Velásquez.

== Assessment ==
In 1978 the independent Timeform organisation gave Tromos a rating of 134, making him their highest-rated two-year-old of the season, two pounds ahead of the French-trained filly Sigy. His rating was the second best achieved by a two-year-old in the 1970s behind Apalachee's 137 and equalling those of My Swallow, Deep Diver and Grundy. In the inaugural International Classification, a collaboration between the official handicappers of France, Ireland and the United Kingdom, Tromos was rated the best two-year-old in Europe ahead of Sigy and Irish River. In the following year he was rated 123 by Timeform, fourteen pounds behind the top three-year-old colt Troy.

In their book, A Century of Champions, based on the Timeform rating system, John Randall and Tony Morris rated Tromos the forty-seventh-best British or Irish two-year-old of the 20th century.

== Stud record ==
Tromos retired from racing to become a breeding stallion at the Pillar Farm. He died of colic at the age of six in October 1982 after two seasons at stud and was buried at the farm. The most successful of his offspring was Trokhos, who won the San Marcos Handicap in 1989. His daughter Tralthee was the granddam of the Cartier Champion Older Horse Soviet Song.

== Pedigree ==
Pedigree of Tromos (GB), chestnut stallion, 1976
Sire Busted (GB) 1963	Crepello (GB); 1954	Donatello	Bleheim
Sire Busted (GB) 1963	Crepello (GB); 1954	Donatello	Delleana
Sire Busted (GB) 1963	Crepello (GB); 1954	Crepuscule	Mieuxce
Sire Busted (GB) 1963	Crepello (GB); 1954	Crepuscule	Red Sunset
Sire Busted (GB) 1963	Sans le Sou (GB); 1957	Vimy	Wild Risk
Sire Busted (GB) 1963	Sans le Sou (GB); 1957	Vimy	Mimi
Sire Busted (GB) 1963	Sans le Sou (GB); 1957	Martial Loan	Court Martial
Sire Busted (GB) 1963	Sans le Sou (GB); 1957	Martial Loan	Neberna
Dam Stilvi (IRE) 1969	Derring-Do (GB); 1961	Darius	Dante
Dam Stilvi (IRE) 1969	Derring-Do (GB); 1961	Darius	Yasna
Dam Stilvi (IRE) 1969	Derring-Do (GB); 1961	Sipsey Bridge	Abernant
Dam Stilvi (IRE) 1969	Derring-Do (GB); 1961	Sipsey Bridge	Claudette
Dam Stilvi (IRE) 1969	Djerella (FR); 1960	Guersant	Bubbles
Dam Stilvi (IRE) 1969	Djerella (FR); 1960	Guersant	Montagnana
Dam Stilvi (IRE) 1969	Djerella (FR); 1960	Djeretta	Djebel
Dam Stilvi (IRE) 1969	Djerella (FR); 1960	Djeretta	Candida (Family 3-h)
