= Bolas (horse) =

British-bred Thoroughbred racehorse

- Sire: Unfuwain
- Grandsire: Northern Dancer
- Dam: Three Stars
- Damsire: Star Appeal
- Sex: Mare
- Foaled: 5 March 1991
- Country: United Kingdom
- Colour: Brown
- Breeder: Juddmonte Farms
- Owner: Khalid Abdullah
- Trainer: Barry Hills
- Record: 6: 3-0-0
- Earnings: £213,315

Major wins
- Cheshire Oaks (1994); Ribblesdale Stakes (1994); Irish Oaks (1994)

Bolas (5 March 1991 – after 2013) was a British Thoroughbred racehorse and broodmare. After finishing unplaced on her only start as a two-year-old in 1993 she emerged as a top-class middle-distance filly in the following year, winning the Cheshire Oaks, Ribblesdale Stakes and Irish Oaks. She finished unplaced in her last two races and was retired from racing at the end of the season with a record of three wins in six starts. She was not successful as a broodmare, producing ony a few minor winners.

== Background ==
Bolas was a brown mare with a small white star bred in England by her owner Khalid Abdullah's Juddmonte Farms. During her racing career she was trained at Lambourn in Berkshire by Barry Hills and was ridden in all of her races by Pat Eddery.

Her sire, Unfuwain was a high-class middle-distance runner who won four Group races before siring the winners of more than five hundred winners at stud. He was particularly successful with fillies: his daughters included Lahan, Petrushka, Eswarah, Lailani and Zahrat Dubai. Bolas's dam Three Stars showed some ability as a racehorse, winning two minor races from four starts as a three-year-old in 1985. Three Stars was a great-granddaughter of the influential broodmare Felucca, whose other descendants included Cut Above, Sharp Edge, Longboat, Bireme, Indigenous and Fenomeno.

== Racing career ==
=== 1993: two-year-old season ===
Bolas made her debut when she was one of twenty-eight juvenile colts and fillies to contest the Westley Maiden Stakes over seven furlongs at Newmarket Racecourse on 30 September. She started at odds of 9/1 and finished eighteenth behind the colt Darnay after fading in the second half of the race.

=== 1994: three-year-old season ===
On her first appearance as a three-year-old Bolas contested the Listed Cheshire Oaks (a trial race for The Oaks) over one mile three and a half furlongsat Chester Racecourse on 4 May. She was made the 5/1 third choice behind the May Hill Stakes winner Hawajiss and State Crystal in an eight-runner field. Bolas took the lead before half way and kept on well when challenged in the straight to win by one and three quarter lengths from State Crystal with seven lengths back to Hawajiss in third. The filly had never been entered in the Eprom Oaks but at Royal Ascot in June she was stepped up in class for the Group 2 Ribblesdale Stakes. In a nine-runner field she was made the 3/1 favourite ahead of Spot Prize (second in the Musidora Stakes), Munnaya (Lingfield Oaks Trial) and Gothic Dream. Bolas took the lead after a furlong and was never seriously challenged, winning by five lengths and three quarters of a length from Gothic Dream and Pearl Kite.

On 9 July Bolas was sent to Ireland and moved up to Group 1 class for the Irish Oaks on soft ground at the Curragh Racecourse. She was made the 5/2 favourite ahead of the Epsom Oaks runner-up Wind In Her Hair who was trained by Barry Hills' son John and ridden by another of his sons Richard. Hawajiss and Gothic Dream where again in opposition, while the other six runners included Bulaxie (Fred Darling Stakes, Lupe Stakes) as well as the French challengers Her Ladyship (second in the Prix de Diane) and Bonash (Prix de Malleret). In another front-running performance, Bolas took the lead from the start and was never headed, keeping on well in the straight to come home two lengths clear of Hawajiss with Gothic Dream in third.

After three consecutive victories against her own generation Bolas was matched against older fillies and mares in the Yorkshire Oaks on 17 August and started 6/5 favourite in a seven-runner field. She attempted to make all the running but was overtaken three furlongs from the finish and was eased down by Eddery to finish fifth, more than ten lengths behind the five-year-old winner Only Royale. After a break of two and a half months Bolas ended her racing career with a trip to the United States to contest the Breeders' Cup Turf at Churchill Downs on 5 November. She started at odds of 9.5/1 but after racing in second place she dropped away in the last half mile and finished tailed-off behind Tikkanen.

== Breeding record ==
After her retirement from racing Bolas became a broodmare for Juddmonte. In November 2005 she was put up for auction at Tattersalls and was bought for 13,000 guineas by Seamus Kennedy. She produced fifteen foals and four minor winners between 1996 and 2013:

- Twice, a bay colt (later gelded), foaled in 1996, sired by Rainbow Quest. Won two races.
- Bolero, bay filly, 1997, by Rainbow Quest. Unraced.
- Shipton Wood, bay colt (gelded), 1998, by Caerleon. Failed to win in seven races.
- Rainbow Lass, bay filly, 1999, by Rainbow Quest. Unraced.
- All Guns, bay colt, 2000, by Darshaan. Unraced.
- Boutique, bay filly, 2001, by Selkirk. Unraced.
- Conniving, bay filly, 2002, by Machiavellian. Unplaced in only race.
- Root Cause, grey colt (gelded), 2003, by Linamix. Won one race under National Hunt rules.
- Hollow Ridge, bay filly, 2004, by Beat Hollow. Won one race.
- Motif, bay filly, 2005, by Observatory. Unraced.
- Miss Beat, bay filly, 2006, by Beat Hollow. Won one race.
- Captain Cornelius, bay colt (gelded), 2007, by Captain Rio. Failed to win in four races.
- Rhiannon, bay filly, 2009, by High Chaparral. Failed to win in eight races.
- Coeur en Joie, bay colt, 2010, by Presenting.
- Panic and Run, bay colt (gelded) 2013, by Roderic O'Connor.

== Pedigree ==
Pedigree of Bolas (GB), brown mare, 1991
Sire Unfuwain (USA) 1985	Northern Dancer (CAN); 1961	Nearctic	Nearco
Sire Unfuwain (USA) 1985	Northern Dancer (CAN); 1961	Nearctic	Lady Angela
Sire Unfuwain (USA) 1985	Northern Dancer (CAN); 1961	Natalma	Native Dancer
Sire Unfuwain (USA) 1985	Northern Dancer (CAN); 1961	Natalma	Almahmoud
Sire Unfuwain (USA) 1985	Height of Fashion (FR); 1979	Bustino	Busted
Sire Unfuwain (USA) 1985	Height of Fashion (FR); 1979	Bustino	Ship Yard
Sire Unfuwain (USA) 1985	Height of Fashion (FR); 1979	Highclere	Queen's Hussar
Sire Unfuwain (USA) 1985	Height of Fashion (FR); 1979	Highclere	Highlight
Dam Three Stars (GB) 1982	Star Appeal (IRE); 1970	Appiani	Herbager
Dam Three Stars (GB) 1982	Star Appeal (IRE); 1970	Appiani	Angela Rucellai
Dam Three Stars (GB) 1982	Star Appeal (IRE); 1970	Sterna	Neckar
Dam Three Stars (GB) 1982	Star Appeal (IRE); 1970	Sterna	Stammesart
Dam Three Stars (GB) 1982	Pirogue (GB); 1971	Reliance	Tantieme
Dam Three Stars (GB) 1982	Pirogue (GB); 1971	Reliance	Relance
Dam Three Stars (GB) 1982	Pirogue (GB); 1971	Cutter	Donatello
Dam Three Stars (GB) 1982	Pirogue (GB); 1971	Cutter	Felucca (Family: 11-d)
