= Zahrat Dubai =

British-bred Thoroughbred racehorse

- Sire: Unfuwain
- Grandsire: Northern Dancer
- Dam: Walesiana
- Damsire: Star Appeal
- Sex: Mare
- Foaled: 29 February 1996
- Country: United Kingdom
- Colour: Brown
- Breeder: Ahmed Al Maktoum
- Owner: Ahmed Al Maktoum; Godolphin
- Trainer: David Loder; Saeed bin Suroor
- Record: 6: 2-0-1
- Earnings: £136,950

Major wins
- Musidora Stakes (1999); Nassau Stakes (1999)

Zahrat Dubai (foaled 29 February 1996) is a British Thoroughbred racehorse and broodmare. After running unplaced in her only race as a juvenile she wintered in Dubai and returned to Britain to record an impressive victory in the Musidora Stakes. She finished third when favourite for The Oaks but then defeated a strong field in the Nassau Stakes. She failed to reproduce her best form in two subsequent races and was retired at the end of the year. Zahrat Dubai became a broodmare and produced two winners from eleven foals.

== Background ==
Zahrat Dubai was a Chestnut mare bred in the United Kingdom bred in England by her first owner Ahmed bin Rashid Al Maktoum. Her sire, Unfuwain was a high-class middle-distance runner who won four Group races before siring the winners of more than five hundred winners at stud. He was particularly successful with fillies: his daughters included Lahan, Petrushka, Eswarah (Irish Oaks), Lailani and Bolas (Irish Oaks). Zahrat Dubai's dam Walesiana was a successful racemare, winning the German 1,000 Guineas in 1990 and came from a family which produced several other major winners in Germany.

Zahrat Dubai was sent into training with David Loder at the Godolphin Stable's British base at Newmarket, Suffolk.

== Racing career ==
=== 1998: two-year-old season ===
Zahrat Dubai made her debut in the Westley Maiden Stakes over seven furlongs at Newmarket Racecourse on 1 October. Ridden by Pat Eddery she finished sixth of the twenty-seven runners behind the colt Easaar.

At the end of the season Zahrat Dubai entered the ownership of Sheikh Mohammed's Godolphin organisation and was transferred to the stable of Saeed bin Suroor, spending the winter in Dubai.

=== 1999: three-year-old season ===
In early 1999 Zahrat Dubai reportedly ran well in trial races in Dubai but did not appear as a three-year-old in Europe until 11 May when she contested the Musidora Stakes (a major trial race for The Oaks) over ten and a half furlong at York Racecourse. Partnered by Mick Kinane, she was made the 6/5 favourite with the best-fancied of her five opponents being Barafamy (winner of the Premio Dormello) and Mother of Pearl (Prix Saint-Roman). Zahrat Dubai tracked the leaders, took the lead two furlongs from the finish and drew well clear of her opponents to win by five lengths from Mother of Pearl. After the race Godolphin's racing manager Simon Crisford said "This is our Oaks filly... we knew she would be very good over today's distance" whilst Saeed bun Suroor commented "she was very relaxed. She blew very hard after the race, so I feel she can improve again for this run".

In the 221st running of the Oaks Stakes at Epsom Racecourse on 4 June Zahrat Dubai, ridden by Frankie Dettori started the 9/4 favourite in a ten-runner field. She tracked the leaders in the early stages and turned into the straight in third place. She briefly challenged for the lead in the last quarter mile was unable to make any further progress and finished third, beaten three lengths and five lengths by Ramruma and Noushkey. On 31 July the filly was dropped back in distance and matched against older fillies and mares in the Nassau Stakes over ten furlongs at Goodwood Racecourse, a race which was being run for the first time as a Group One event. Ridden by the American jockey Gary Stevens she started the 5/1 third favourite behind Alborada and Cape Verdi whilst the other runners were Kissogram (Sun Chariot Stakes), Lady in Waiting (Middleton Stakes), Juvenia (Prix Marcel Boussac), Alabaq (Pretty Polly Stakes) and Diamond White. Zahrat Dubai took the lead soon after the start made all the running and repelled several challenges in the straight and won by half a length and a neck from Lady in Waiting and Diamond White. Although Stevens received a two-day ban for careless riding the racecourse stewards ruled that the result was not affected. He commented "It's a personal milestone to get my first Group 1 in Britain... She's a pretty straightforward filly to ride, but it wasn't an easy run... The last furlong she was rolling around, but I felt she won with something left".

In August Zahrat Dubai moved back up to one and a half miles and faced a rematch with Ramruma in the Yorkshire Oaks in which she was ridden by Dettori. After tracking the leaders she failed to quicken in the straight and finished fourth of the eleven runners behind Ramruma, Ela Athena and Silver Rhapsody. On her final appearance, the filly was sent to France and started second favourite for the Prix de l'Opéra over 1850 metres at Longchamp Racecourse on 3 October. After leading for most of the way she faded in the last 300 metres and finished fifth behind Diamond White.

== Breeding record ==
Zahrat Dubai was retired from racing to become a broodmare for Sheikh Mohammed's Darley Stud. She has produced at least eleven foals and two winners:

- Qaadimm, a bay colt, foaled in 2001, sired by Rahy. Failed to win in two races.
- Qaadmah, bay filly, 2002, by Dubai Millennium. Failed to win in five races.
- Shariki, brown colt, 2003, by Spectrum. Won one race.
- Own Gift, bay filly, 2004, by Rahy. Failed to win in three races.
- Lazeyma, brown filly, 2005 by Fantastic Light. Failed to win in four races.
- Taarkod, brown filly, 2006, by Singspiel. Unraced.
- Modeyra, brown filly, 2007, by Shamardal. Won two races including the Listed Severals Stakes.
- Serjaan, bay colt, 2008, by Monsun. Failed to win in three races.
- Shemaal, colt, 2010, by Monsun. Failed to win in three races.
- Fullaah, bay filly, 2011, by Shamardal. Failed to win in one race.
- Zamzama, bay filly, 2012, by Shamardal. Failed to win in one race,

== Pedigree ==
Pedigree of Zahrat Dubai (GB), brown mare, 1996
Sire Unfuwain (USA) 1985	Northern Dancer (CAN); 1961	Nearctic	Nearco
Sire Unfuwain (USA) 1985	Northern Dancer (CAN); 1961	Nearctic	Lady Angela
Sire Unfuwain (USA) 1985	Northern Dancer (CAN); 1961	Natalma	Native Dancer
Sire Unfuwain (USA) 1985	Northern Dancer (CAN); 1961	Natalma	Almahmoud
Sire Unfuwain (USA) 1985	Height of Fashion (FR); 1979	Bustino	Busted
Sire Unfuwain (USA) 1985	Height of Fashion (FR); 1979	Bustino	Ship Yard
Sire Unfuwain (USA) 1985	Height of Fashion (FR); 1979	Highclere	Queen's Hussar
Sire Unfuwain (USA) 1985	Height of Fashion (FR); 1979	Highclere	Highlight
Dam Walesiana (GER) 1987	Star Appeal (IRE); 1970	Appiani	Herbager
Dam Walesiana (GER) 1987	Star Appeal (IRE); 1970	Appiani	Angela Rucellai
Dam Walesiana (GER) 1987	Star Appeal (IRE); 1970	Sterna	Neckar
Dam Walesiana (GER) 1987	Star Appeal (IRE); 1970	Sterna	Stammesart
Dam Walesiana (GER) 1987	Wondrous Pearl (GB); 1980	Prince Ippi	Imperial
Dam Walesiana (GER) 1987	Wondrous Pearl (GB); 1980	Prince Ippi	Prinzess Addi
Dam Walesiana (GER) 1987	Wondrous Pearl (GB); 1980	Weltwunder	Watteau
Dam Walesiana (GER) 1987	Wondrous Pearl (GB); 1980	Weltwunder	Wacholdis (Family: 4-o)
