= 1988 Epsom Derby =

- Derby
- Location: Epsom Downs Racecourse
- Date: 1 June 1988
- Winning horse: Kahyasi
- Starting price: 11/1
- Jockey: Ray Cochrane
- Trainer: Luca Cumani
- Owner: Aga Khan IV

Epsom Derby 1988
1-2-3
Kahyasi	Glacial Storm	Doyoun

Also Ran
4-5-6
Red Glow	Kefaah	Sheriff's Star
7-8-9
Unfuwain	Minster Son	Project Manager
10-11-12
Al Mufti	Charmer	Clifton Chapel
13-14
Maksud	Al Muhalhal	14 Ran

The 1988 Epsom Derby was a horse race which took place at Epsom Downs on Wednesday 1 June 1988. It was the 209th running of the Derby, and it was won by Kahyasi. The winner was ridden by Ray Cochrane and trained by Luca Cumani. The pre-race favourite Red Glow finished fourth.

== Race details ==
- Sponsor: Ever Ready
- Winner's prize money: £296,500
- Going: Good
- Number of runners: 14
- Winner's time: 2m 33.84s

== Full result ==
	*	Horse	Jockey	Trainer ^{†}	SP
1		Kahyasi	Ray Cochrane	Luca Cumani	11/1
2	1½	Glacial Storm	Michael Hills	Barry Hills	14/1
3	1½	Doyoun	Walter Swinburn	Michael Stoute	9/1
4	½	Red Glow	Pat Eddery	Geoff Wragg	5/2 fav
5	nk	Kefaah	John Reid	Luca Cumani	25/1
6	3	Sheriff's Star	Tony Ives	Lady Herries	18/1
7	hd	Unfuwain	Steve Cauthen	Dick Hern	9/2
8	6	Minster Son	Willie Carson	Dick Hern	6/1
9	½	Project Manager	Kevin Manning	Jim Bolger (IRE)	66/1
10	2½	Al Mufti	Richard Hills	Harry Thomson Jones	14/1
11	1	Charmer	Paul Eddery	Dick Hern	11/1
12		Clifton Chapel	Billy Newnes	Steve Norton	100/1
13		Maksud	Michael Roberts	Robert Armstrong	200/1
14		Al Muhalhal	Paul D'Arcy	Harry Thomson Jones	500/1

* The distances between the horses are shown in lengths or shorter. hd = head; nk = neck.
† Trainers are based in Great Britain unless indicated.

== Winner's details ==
Further details of the winner, Kahyasi:

- Foaled: April 2, 1985, in Ireland
- Sire: Ile de Bourbon; Dam: Kadissya (Blushing Groom)
- Owner: HH Aga Khan IV
- Breeder: HH Aga Khan IV
- Rating in 1988 International Classifications: 126

== Form analysis ==
=== Two-year-old races ===
Notable runs by the future Derby participants as two-year-olds in 1987.

- Glacial Storm – 1st Horris Hill Stakes
- Sheriff's Star – 2nd Futurity Stakes
- Unfuwain – 1st Haynes, Hanson and Clark Stakes
- Minster Son – 5th Horris Hill Stakes
- Project Manager – 1st Tyros Stakes, 4th National Stakes
- Clifton Chapel – 6th Prix Saint-Roman

=== The road to Epsom ===
Early-season appearances in 1988 and trial races prior to running in the Derby.

- Kahyasi – 1st Lingfield Derby Trial
- Glacial Storm – 2nd Sandown Classic Trial, 3rd Dante Stakes
- Doyoun – 1st Craven Stakes, 1st 2,000 Guineas
- Red Glow – 2nd Newmarket Stakes, 1st Dante Stakes
- Kefaah – 1st Feilden Stakes, 2nd Dante Stakes
- Sheriff's Star – 2nd Predominate Stakes
- Unfuwain – 1st Warren Stakes, 1st Chester Vase
- Minster Son – 1st Newmarket Stakes, 1st Predominate Stakes
- Project Manager – 1st Gowran Classic Trial, 6th Irish 2,000 Guineas, 1st Gallinule Stakes
- Al Mufti – 5th European Free Handicap, 3rd Predominate Stakes
- Charmer – 2nd European Free Handicap, 2nd 2,000 Guineas
- Clifton Chapel – 1st Dee Stakes
- Maksud – 3rd Sandown Classic Trial, 2nd Derrinstown Stud Derby Trial

=== Subsequent Group 1 wins ===
Group 1 / Grade I victories after running in the Derby.

- Kahyasi – Irish Derby (1988)
- Sheriff's Star – Coronation Cup (1989), Grand Prix de Saint-Cloud (1989)
- Minster Son – St. Leger (1988)

== Subsequent breeding careers ==
Leading progeny of participants in the 1988 Epsom Derby.

=== Sires of Classic winners ===
Unfuwain (7th)

- Bolas - 1st Irish Oaks (1994)
- Lahan - 1st 1000 Guineas Stakes (2000)
- Petrushka - 1st Irish Oaks (2000)
- Lailani - 1st Irish Oaks (2001)
- Eswarah - 1st Epsom Oaks (2005)

Kahyasi (1st)

- Vereva - 1st Prix de Diane (1997)
- Zainta - 1st Prix de Diane (1998)
- Hasili - Dam of Dansili, Banks Hill, Heat Haze (1st Beverly D. Stakes 2003), Intercontinental, Cacique, Champs Elysees and Deluxe (2nd Prix Saint-Alary 2010)
- Paddy's Return - 1st Triumph Hurdle (1996), 1st Champion Stayers Hurdle (1997). 1st Long Walk Hurdle (1997)

Doyoun (3rd)

- Daylami - 1st Poule d'Essai des Poulains (1997)
- Margarula - 1st Irish Oaks (2002)
- Kalanisi - Cartier Champion Older Horse (2000)
- Mistinguett - 1st Cleeve Hurdle (1998)

=== Sires of National Hunt horses ===
Glacial Storm (2nd)

- Alexander Banquet - 1st Hennessy Cognac Gold Cup (2002)
- Gunther McBride - 1st Racing Post Chase (2002)
- Kates Charm - 1st Cleeve Hurdle 2002
- Tempest Belle - Dam of Monalee

Minster Son (8th)

- Rambling Minster - 1st Blue Square Gold Cup (2009)
- Minster Glory - 2nd Castleford Chase (2001)
- Ross Comm - 1st Cumberland Handicap Chase (2005)

=== Other Stallions ===
Sheriff's Star (6th) - Seuin Sky (1st Kikuka-shō 1998)
Charmer (11th) - Passion For Life (1st Abernant Stakes 1996), Quinze (1st Galway Hurdle 1999)
Kefaah (5th) - Dr Leunt (1st Rehearsal Chase 1999) - Exported to South Africa
Al Mufti (10th) - Exported to South Africa - Victory Moon (3rd Dubai World Cup 2004), Captail Al - Champion Sire in South Africa
Red Glow (4th) - Exported to New Zealand - Mr Mutual Respect (3rd Australian Guineas 1994)
Project Manager (9th) - Strong Project (1st Phil Sweeney Memorial Chase 2006)
