= Lailani =

British-bred Thoroughbred racehorse

- Sire: Unfuwain
- Grandsire: Northern Dancer
- Dam: Lailati
- Damsire: Mr. Prospector
- Sex: Mare
- Foaled: 2 February 1998
- Country: United Kingdom
- Colour: Bay
- Breeder: Gainsborough Stud
- Owner: Maktoum Al Maktoum
- Trainer: Ed Dunlop
- Record: 10: 7-0-0
- Earnings: £514,981

Major wins
- Irish Oaks (2001); Nassau Stakes (2001); Flower Bowl Invitational Stakes (2001)

Lailani (foaled 2 February 1998) is a British Thoroughbred racehorse and broodmare. In a racing career which lasted from October 2000 until October 2001 she won seven of her ten races including Group One/ Grade I races in three countries. After showing little ability in two races as a juvenile she made relentless progress as a three-year-old, winning seven consecutive races including the Irish Oaks in Ireland, the Nassau Stakes in England and the Flower Bowl Invitational Stakes in the United States. After her retirement from racing she had some success as a broodmare.

== Background ==
Lailani was a bay mare with an interrupted white stripe bred in the United Kingdom by her owner, Maktoum Al Maktoum, Gainsborough Stud. Her sire, Unfuwain was a high-class middle-distance runner who won four Group races before siring the winners of more than five hundred winners at stud. He was particularly successful with fillies: his daughters included Lahan, Petrushka, Eswarah (Irish Oaks), Zahrat Dubai (Nassau Stakes) and Bolas (Irish Oaks). Lailani's dam Lailati failed to win in five races and produced several other winners. She was distantly descended from the American broodmare Passan, a half-sister to Colin.

Lailani was sent into training with Ed Dunlop at Newmarket, Suffolk.

== Racing career ==
=== 2000: two-year-old season ===
Lailani made no impact in two races as a two-year-old in 2000, finishing unplaced in maiden races at Doncaster and Newmarket in October.

=== 2001: three-year-old season ===
On her three-year-old debut, contested a maiden over one mile at Windsor Racecourse on 23 April and started at odds of 3/1 in an eleven-runner field. Ridden by Gary Carter she took the lead two furlong out and drew right away from her rivals to win by ten lengths despite being eased down in the final strides. In May and June Lailani competed in handicap races and won all three of her starts under her new jockey Frankie Dettori with her official rating improving from 80 to 104. She won over ten furlongs at Newmarket, ten and a half furlongs at Haydock Park ten furlongs and Epsom. On 15 July Lailani was moved up sharply in class for the Group One Irish Oaks over one and a half miles at the Curragh and started the 5/1 second favourite behind the Barry Hills-trained Relish The Thought who had finished third in The Oaks. The other ten runners included Time Away (Musidora Stakes), Rebelline (Pretty Polly Stakes (Ireland)), Mot Juste (also trained by Ed Dunlop and the winner of the Pretty Polly Stakes (Great Britain)) and Sequoyah (Moyglare Stud Stakes). Lailani was restrained by Dettori and turned into the straight in sixth place behind the outsider Chamela Bay. Mot Juste took the lead in the last quarter mile but Lailani produced a strong late run to gain the advantage in the final furlong and won by a neck from her stablemate. After the race Dunlop said "The wonderful thing on a great day for me is that I have won the race for Sheikh Maktoum, who wanted to run Lailani in this race, owns my yard and has given me some top-class horses to train all along. I thought Lailani had it all to do from the No 1 draw, but Frankie gave her a wonderful ride".

Lailani was brought back in distance and matched against older fillies and mares in the Nassau Stakes over ten furlongs at Goodwood Racecourse on 4 August. Sequoyah and Time Away were again in opposition as well as the Sun Chariot Stakes winner Danceabout. After racing in third place behind the outsider Snowflake she took the lead in the final furlong and won by one and a half lengths with Snowflake holding on for second ahead of Time Away. Dettori commented "I had to wait a little bit and give her something to aim at but she really gave everything to me. I think that she is a bit of a favorite with the crowds now that she has won six. She is a buzzy little filly and has had some tough races. She was getting as bit warm but I am very good with the fillies!"

In September Lailani was sent to the United States for the Grade I Flower Bowl Invitational over ten furlongs at Belmont Park. Ridden by Jerry Bailey, she started at odds of 2.95/1 against five opponents headed by England's Legend (winner of the Beverly D. Stakes) and Starine. After racing in third place for most of the way she overtook England's Legend 100 yards from the finish and won by three quarters of a length to record her seventh win in succession. After the race Bailey commented "I didn't know what to expect from her since this was my first time riding her. She handled everything great. She accelerated pretty quickly on the turn and I give her a lot of credit for running down England's Legend".

A month later Lailani contested the Breeders' Cup Filly & Mare Turf over the sake course and distance and started second favourite behind England's Legend. With Bailey again in the saddle she raced in fifth place but was unable to make any progress in the straight and finished eighth of the twelve runners behind Banks Hill.

== Breeding record ==
Lailani was retired to become a broodmare for the Gainsborough Stud's base at Versailles, Kentucky. She produced at least seven foals:

- Paullinus, a chestnut colt, foaled in 2003, sired by A.P. Indy. Won four races in the United States.
- Gabriels Hill, bay colt, 2004, by A.P. Indy. Won four races in the United States.
- Sovereign Remedy, chestnut colt, 2006, by Elusive Quality. Won two races in the United Kingdom.
- Ley Hunter, bay colt, 2007, by Kingmambo. Won four races in France including the Prix Gladiateur.
- Lacily, bay filly, 2009, by Elusive Quality. Won one race in England.
- Linford, chestnut colt (later gelded), 2010, by Street Cry. Unraced.

== Pedigree ==
Pedigree of Lailani (GB), bay mare, 1998
| Sire Unfuwain (USA) 1985 | Northern Dancer (CAN); 1961 | Nearctic | Nearco |
| Sire Unfuwain (USA) 1985 | Northern Dancer (CAN); 1961 | Nearctic | Lady Angela |
| Sire Unfuwain (USA) 1985 | Northern Dancer (CAN); 1961 | Natalma | Native Dancer |
| Sire Unfuwain (USA) 1985 | Northern Dancer (CAN); 1961 | Natalma | Almahmoud |
| Sire Unfuwain (USA) 1985 | Height of Fashion (FR); 1979 | Bustino | Busted |
| Sire Unfuwain (USA) 1985 | Height of Fashion (FR); 1979 | Bustino | Ship Yard |
| Sire Unfuwain (USA) 1985 | Height of Fashion (FR); 1979 | Highclere | Queens Hussar |
| Sire Unfuwain (USA) 1985 | Height of Fashion (FR); 1979 | Highclere | Highlight |
| Dam Lailati (USA) 1990 | Mr. Prospector (USA); 1970 | Raise a Native | Native Dancer |
| Dam Lailati (USA) 1990 | Mr. Prospector (USA); 1970 | Raise a Native | Raise You |
| Dam Lailati (USA) 1990 | Mr. Prospector (USA); 1970 | Gold Digger | Nashua |
| Dam Lailati (USA) 1990 | Mr. Prospector (USA); 1970 | Gold Digger | Sequence |
| Dam Lailati (USA) 1990 | Carduel (USA); 1978 | Buckpasser | Tom Fool |
| Dam Lailati (USA) 1990 | Carduel (USA); 1978 | Buckpasser | Busanda |
| Dam Lailati (USA) 1990 | Carduel (USA); 1978 | Minstrelete | Round Table |
| Dam Lailati (USA) 1990 | Carduel (USA); 1978 | Minstrelete | Gay Violin (Family: 19-b) |
