= Unfuwain =

American-bred, British-trained Thoroughbred racehorse

- Racing colours of Hamdan Al Maktoum
- Sire: Northern Dancer
- Grandsire: Nearctic
- Dam: Height of Fashion
- Damsire: Bustino
- Sex: Stallion
- Foaled: 5 March 1985
- Country: United States
- Colour: Bay
- Breeder: Hamdan Al Maktoum.
- Owner: Hamdan Al Maktoum.
- Trainer: Dick Hern
- Record: 10: 6-2-0
- Earnings: £206,858

Major wins
- Haynes, Hanson & Clark Stakes (1987); Chester Vase (1988); Princess of Wales's Stakes (1988); John Porter Stakes (1989); Jockey Club Stakes (1989)

Awards
- Leading British-based Stallion (2000); Timeform rating: 130
- Last updated on 2 August 2022

Unfuwain (5 March 1985 – 16 January 2002) was an American-bred, British-trained Thoroughbred racehorse bred and owned by Hamdan Al Maktoum. In a career of ten starts from 1987 to 1989, he won four Group races and was placed in the King George VI and Queen Elizabeth Stakes and the Prix de l'Arc de Triomphe. He went on to become a successful sire.

== Background ==
Unfuwain was a strongly-built, 16.1 hand bay horse, bred in Kentucky by his owner Hamdan Al Maktoum. He was one of the last important winners sired by Northern Dancer. As a son of the mare Height of Fashion, he was a half-brother to several important winners, including the Derby winner Nashwan and the multiple Group One winner Nayef. He went into training with Dick Hern at West Ilsley and was ridden in all but one of his starts by the stable jockey Willie Carson.

== Racing career ==
=== 1987: two-year-old season ===
Unfuwain made two starts in the late summer of 1987. On his debut, he finished second in a 27-runner maiden race at Newbury to the subsequent St Leger winner Minster Son. He confirmed the promise of this run with a win in the Haynes, Hanson and Clark Conditions Stakes at the same track a month later. His early runs established his racing style; he lacked acceleration but was able to sustain a "relentless" gallop over sustained distances.

=== 1988: three-year-old season ===
In April 1988, Unfuwain began his three-year-old career by winning the Warren Stakes at Epsom by 15 lengths. Two weeks later, he moved up in class and recorded an eight length win in the Group Three Chester Vase, taking the lead in the straight and finishing "unchallenged".

As a result of these victories, he was a leading fancy for the 1988 Epsom Derby, starting as the 9-2 second favourite. He disappointed in the classic, finishing seventh behind Kahyasi. He was beaten by horse of his own generation only on this occasion, apart from his debut. It was also the only race of his career in which he was not ridden by Carson, who chose to ride Minster Son, a colt he had bred himself. The ride instead went to Steve Cauthen.

After a brief break, he returned in the Princess of Wales's Stakes and, facing older horses, produced his best performance, taking the lead two furlongs out and pulling away to win by fifteen lengths from a field which included Canadian International Stakes winner Infamy, and Breeders' Cup Classic runner-up Ibn Bey. Coincidentally, this was the race in which his mother, Height of Fashion, had recorded her most important success when defeating Ardross in 1982.

He was made 2-1 favourite for the King George VI and Queen Elizabeth Stakes at Ascot three weeks later. He ran up to his best form, taking the lead in the straight before finishing second to Mtoto, ahead of the subsequent Prix de l'Arc de Triomphe winner Tony Bin. In his final race of the year, he finished fourth in the Arc, beaten just over a length behind Tony Bin, Mtoto and Boyatino. In both the King George and the Arc, he finished well ahead of the other three-year-olds.

=== 1989: four-year-old season ===
Unfuwain's four-year-old career consisted of just two races in the spring of 1989, for both of which he started odds-on favourite. At Newbury in April, he led half a mile from home and ran on strongly to beat Per Quod by one and a half lengths in the John Porter Stakes. Once again, he was following a family pattern, the race having been won the year before by his full brother Alwasmi.

Three weeks later in the Jockey Club Stakes at Newmarket Unfuwain went clear a quarter mile from home and did not have to be put under pressure to record a one length win over the Derby runner-up Glacial Storm. Sheriff's Star, who went on to win both the Coronation Cup and Grand Prix de Saint-Cloud later that summer, was beaten a further six lengths in fourth.

As the season progressed, Unfuwain reportedly became difficult to train and was retired to stud without racing again.

== Assessment ==
In the official International Classification, Unfuwain was the fourth highest-rated three-year-old colt in Europe in 1988 and the highest-rated colt in the 11-14 furlong division.

Unfuwain was given a Timeform rating of 99p as a two-year-old, 130 as a three-year-old and 126 as a four-year-old.

== Stud career ==
Unfuwain was retired to his owner's Nunnery Stud at Thetford in Norfolk. As a stallion, Unfuwain sired numerous top-class performers. He was especially successful as an influence for stamina, and his fillies tended to be better than his colts.

His progeny include Lahan, Petrushka, Lailani, Zahrat Dubai, Bolas, Eswarah and Alhaarth.

Unfuwain's most notable achievement as a sire came in the 1,000 Guineas in 2000. He was the sire of Lahan and Petrushka, who finished first and third respectively, and he was also the maternal grandsire of the runner-up, Princess Ellen.

In January 2001 he was awarded the title of Leading British-based Stallion for the previous year by the Thoroughbred Breeders' Association.

Unfuwain died from a neurological condition at the Nunnery Stud on 16 January 2002. The stud's director, Richard Lancaster described him as " a most wonderful horse to deal with. He had immense courage and will be remembered with great affection."

== Pedigree ==
Pedigree of Unfuwain
Sire Northern Dancer	Nearctic	Nearco	Pharos
Sire Northern Dancer	Nearctic	Nearco	Nogara
Sire Northern Dancer	Nearctic	Lady Angela	Hyperion
Sire Northern Dancer	Nearctic	Lady Angela	Sister Sarah
Sire Northern Dancer	Natalma	Native Dancer	Polynesian
Sire Northern Dancer	Natalma	Native Dancer	Geisha
Sire Northern Dancer	Natalma	Almahmoud	Mahmoud
Sire Northern Dancer	Natalma	Almahmoud	Arbitrator
Dam Height of Fashion	Bustino	Busted	Crepello
Dam Height of Fashion	Bustino	Busted	Sans le Sou
Dam Height of Fashion	Bustino	Ship Yard	Doutelle
Dam Height of Fashion	Bustino	Ship Yard	Paving Stone
Dam Height of Fashion	Highclere	Queen's Hussar	March Past
Dam Height of Fashion	Highclere	Queen's Hussar	Jojo
Dam Height of Fashion	Highclere	Highlight	Borealis
Dam Height of Fashion	Highclere	Highlight	Hypericum
