= Nashwan =

American-bred Thoroughbred racehorse

- Racing silks of Hamdan Al Maktoum
- Sire: Blushing Groom
- Grandsire: Red God
- Dam: Height of Fashion
- Damsire: Bustino
- Sex: Stallion
- Foaled: 1 March 1986
- Country: USA
- Colour: Chestnut
- Breeder: Hamdan Al Maktoum
- Owner: Hamdan Al Maktoum
- Trainer: Dick Hern
- Record: 7: 6-0-1
- Earnings: £793,248

Major wins
- Autumn Stakes (1988); 2,000 Guineas (1989); Epsom Derby (1989); Eclipse Stakes (1989); K. George VI & Q. Elizabeth Stakes (1989)

Awards
- Timeform rating: 135

Nashwan (1 March 1986 – 19 July 2002) was an American-bred, British-trained Thoroughbred racehorse and sire. After winning both his starts as a two-year-old, he developed into an outstanding performer in the spring and summer of 1989, completing a unique four-timer when winning the 2000 Guineas, Epsom Derby, Eclipse Stakes, and King George VI and Queen Elizabeth Stakes. After sustaining his only defeat in the Prix Niel in September, he was retired to stud where he was a successful sire of winners.

== Background ==
Nashwan was a large, powerfully built chestnut horse with a white star and a white sock on his right foreleg bred by his owner Hamdan Al Maktoum at his Shadwell Farm in Lexington, Kentucky. He was sired by the 1977 Poule d'Essai des Poulains winner Blushing Groom. Blushing Groom became an exceptionally successful breeding stallion, siring Rainbow Quest, Blushing John, Arazi, and many other leading horses. Nashwan's successes made him the Leading sire in Great Britain & Ireland in 1989. Nashwan's dam was Height of Fashion, a daughter of Bustino previously owned by Queen Elizabeth II. He was thus a half-brother to the Group Race winners Alwasmi, Unfuwain, and Nayef, and a close relative of the Japanese champion Deep Impact and the 1000 Guineas winner Ghanaati.

Nashwan was trained throughout his racing career by Major Dick Hern at West Ilsley in Berkshire, England, and was ridden in all of his races by Willie Carson. His name was reported to be an Arabic word meaning "joy".

== 1988: two-year-old season ==
Nashwan made his debut in the Yattendon Maiden Stakes at Newbury in August 1988. He started 6/4 favourite in a field of 27 runners and won by three quarters of a length from Young Turpin, with the unplaced runners including the subsequent Derby Italiano winner Prorutori. On 8 October, Nashwan was moved up in class to contest the Listed Autumn Stakes over one mile at Ascot. Starting the odds-on favourite, he took the lead inside the final quarter mile and drew away to win by four lengths from Optimist, with Cacoethes in third.

== 1989: three-year-old season ==
In the spring of 1989, reports of impressive work at home saw Nashwan's odds for Classic Races continually shorten, and when he began his three-year-old campaign in the General Accident 2000 Guineas at Newmarket on 6 May, he started the race as 3/1 favourite. He took the lead approaching the final quarter mile and won by a length, with Exbourne in second and Danehill a further half length behind in third.

A month later, Nashwan was moved up in distance for the Ever Ready Derby over one and a half miles at Epsom Downs Racecourse. Despite the unseasonably cold, damp weather, the race attracted an estimated 500,000 spectators including Queen Elizabeth II. Nashwan started 5/4 favourite against eleven opponents, with the biggest danger expected to come from Cacoethes, winner of the Lingfield Derby Trial. Carson positioned the favourite just behind the leaders before moving up to take the lead from Cacoethes in the straight. He pulled "effortlessly" clear in the closing stages to win by five lengths from the 500/1 outsider Terimon, who finished well to deprive Cacoethes of second. He was the first horse to complete the Guineas-Derby double since Nijinsky II in 1970, though he was emulated by Sea the Stars in 2009 and Camelot in 2012.

Nashwan's next task was to prove himself against older opposition, starting with the Eclipse Stakes over one and a quarter miles at Sandown Park on 8 July. Despite having recently recovered from a foot infection and facing both the outstanding racemare Indian Skimmer and the champion miler Warning, he was sent off the 2/5 favourite. Nashwan took the lead approaching the final furlong and won by five lengths from the outsider Opening Verse, who later won the Breeders' Cup Mile. Two weeks later, Nashwan contested Britain's most prestigious all-aged race, the King George VI and Queen Elizabeth Stakes over one and a half miles at Ascot. With the late withdrawal of Prix du Jockey Club winner Old Vic, Nashwan was expected to win easily and started as 2/9 favourite. This time he had to fight for his victory, with old rival Cacoethes challenging him throughout the final two furlongs. Nashwan was driven out by Carson to win by a neck, with the subsequent Prix de l'Arc de Triomphe winner Carroll House a further eleven lengths back in fifth. His narrow margin of victory led some critics to question his status as a "super-horse".

Nashwan's owner decided not to attempt the Triple Crown in the St Leger Stakes, and the colt was instead aimed at the Prix de l'Arc de Triomphe at Longchamp in October. To prepare for this race, he was sent to the Prix Niel over the Arc course and distance on 17 September. Racing on soft ground, Nashwan moved up to challenge in the straight but made no further progress and finished third, beaten one and a half lengths and half a length by the French-trained colts Golden Pheasant and French Glory. Neither Hern nor Carson could offer any explanation for the "lifeless" performance, with the jockey commenting that the 1/5 favourite "didn't have any energy". Nashwan missed the Arc, and, as had been announced in summer, he was retired from racing at the end of the year.

== Assessment ==
Nashwan was rated the third best British-trained three-year-old of 1989. The independent Timeform organisation gave him a rating of 135, behind Zilzal (137) and Old Vic (136). The official International Classification also placed him third behind the same two colts. He is the only horse to have won the 2000 Guineas, Epsom Derby, Eclipse and King George VI & Queen Elizabeth Stakes in the same season. Dick Hern called Nashwan "the best horse I've ever trained".

== Stud record ==
Nashwan was retired from racing to become a breeding stallion at his owner's Shadwell Stud. His most successful racehorses were Swain (foaled 1992), dual winner of the King George VI and Queen Elizabeth Diamond Stakes, and Bago (2001), winner of the Prix de l'Arc de Triomphe. The best of his fillies was the International Stakes winner One So Wonderful.

He died while at Shadwell Stud on 19 July 2002, after suffering complications following an operation on a minor leg injury.

== Cultural references ==
British computer game developer Bitmap Brothers included references to Nashwan in many of their games. For example, Super Nashwan Power in Xenon 2 Megablast, Super Nashwan in Speedball 2, and "Nashwan" is used as a password in Gods.

== Pedigree ==
Pedigree of Nashwan (USA), chestnut stallion 1986
Sire Blushing Groom (USA) 1974	Red God (USA); 1954	Nasrullah	Nearco
Sire Blushing Groom (USA) 1974	Red God (USA); 1954	Nasrullah	Mumtaz Begum
Sire Blushing Groom (USA) 1974	Red God (USA); 1954	Spring Run	Menow
Sire Blushing Groom (USA) 1974	Red God (USA); 1954	Spring Run	Boola Brook
Sire Blushing Groom (USA) 1974	Runaway Bride (GB); 1962	Wild Risk	Rialto
Sire Blushing Groom (USA) 1974	Runaway Bride (GB); 1962	Wild Risk	Wild Violet
Sire Blushing Groom (USA) 1974	Runaway Bride (GB); 1962	Aimée	Tudor Minstrel
Sire Blushing Groom (USA) 1974	Runaway Bride (GB); 1962	Aimée	Emali
Dam Height of Fashion (GB) 1979	Bustino (GB); 1971	Busted	Crepello
Dam Height of Fashion (GB) 1979	Bustino (GB); 1971	Busted	Sans le Sou
Dam Height of Fashion (GB) 1979	Bustino (GB); 1971	Ship Yard	Doutelle
Dam Height of Fashion (GB) 1979	Bustino (GB); 1971	Ship Yard	Paving Stone
Dam Height of Fashion (GB) 1979	Highclere (GB); 1971	Queen's Hussar	March Past
Dam Height of Fashion (GB) 1979	Highclere (GB); 1971	Queen's Hussar	Jojo
Dam Height of Fashion (GB) 1979	Highclere (GB); 1971	Highlight	Borealis
Dam Height of Fashion (GB) 1979	Highclere (GB); 1971	Highlight	Hypericum (Family 2-f)
