= Height of Fashion Stakes =

Flat horse race in Britain

- Class: Listed
- Location: Goodwood Racecourse; W. Sussex, England
- Inaugurated: 1972
- Race type: Flat / Thoroughbred
- Sponsor: William Hill
- Website: Goodwood

Race information
- Distance: 1m 1f 197y (1,991m)
- Surface: Turf
- Track: Right-handed
- Qualification: Three-year-old fillies
- Weight: 9 st 2 lb Penalties; 5 lb for Group winners* 3 lb for Listed winners* *after 31 August 2023
- Purse: £60,000 (2024); 1st: £34,026

Height Of Fashion Stakes
2026
Inis Mor	Earth Shot	On Message

Previous years
2025
Victoria Harbour	Music Piece	Never Let Go
2024
Francophone	Regal Jubilee	Where I Wanna Be
2023
Araminta	Understated	Secret Solace
2022
Sea Silk Road	Eternal Pearl	Viareggio
2021
Ad Infinitum	Lady Hayes	Aura Blue

2020-2011
2019
Aloe Vera	Shambolic	Love So Deep
2018
Magnolia Springs	Shaherezada	Herecomesthesun
2017
Mori	Coconut Creme	Indian Blessing
2016
Skiffle	The Black Princess	Play Gal
2015
Lady Of Dubai	Encore L'amour	Jellicle Ball
2014
Marsh Daisy	Eastern Belle	Psychometry
2013
Elik	Heading North	Harmonic Note
2012
Coquet	Minidress	Gathering
2011
Beatrice Aurore	Highest	Imperial Pippin

2010-2001
2010
Snow Fairy	Pipette	Deirdre
2009
Moneycantbuymelove	Fallen In Love	Say No Now
2008
Michita	Annie Skates	Rosa Grace
2007
Cosmodrome	Sudoor	Impetious
2006
Rising Cross	Soft Centre	Nyarhini
2005
Something Exciting	Thakafaat	Corcoran
2004
Halicardia	Spotlight	Carini
2003
Ocean Silk	Mezzo Soprano	Hearts 'n Minds
2002
Mellow Park	Kootenay	Cozy Maria
2001
Foodbroker Fancy	Arhaaff	Candice

2000-1991
2000
Love Divine	Spinning Top	Inforapenny
1999
Claxon	Musical Treat	Oriental Fashion
1998
Napoleon's Sister	Putuna	Enchant
1997
Maid Of Camelot	Priena	Keyboogie
1996
Whitewater Affair	Shemozzle	Papering
1995
Subya	Tillandsia	Yarn
1994
Bulaxie	Highland Legend	Reason To Dance
1993
Gisarne	Yawl	Seasonal Splendour
1992
Oumaldaaya	Niodini	Fern
1991
Fragrant Hill	Satin Flower	Fife

1990-1983
1990
Moon Cactus	Game Plan	Front Line Romance
1989
Lady Shipley	Miss Fancy That	Lucky Song
1988
Miss Boniface	Haiati	Suntrap
1987
Scimitarra	Bint Pasha	Trojan Miss
1986
Tralthee	Altiyna	Land of Ivory
1985
Bella Colora	Goody Blake	Gay Hellene
1984
Miss Beaulieu	Celtic Assembly	Troyanna
1983
Current Raiser	Mytinia	Hardihostess

The Height of Fashion Stakes is a Listed flat horse race in Great Britain open to three-year-old fillies. It is run at Goodwood over a distance of 1 mile, 1 furlong and 197 yards (1,991 metres), and it is scheduled to take place each year in May.

== History ==
The event was established in 1972, and it was originally called the Lupe Stakes. It was named after Lupe, the winner of The Oaks in 1970. It was briefly run over a distance of 1 mile 4 furlongs from 1981 to 1983.

The race was renamed the Height of Fashion Stakes in 2007. It now pays tribute to Height of Fashion, a filly whose victories included the Lupe Stakes in 1982. She became a successful broodmare, and was the dam of Unfuwain, Nashwan and Nayef.

The Height of Fashion Stakes sometimes serves as a trial for the Epsom Oaks. The last horse to win both races was Snow Fairy in 2010.

== Records ==
Leading jockey (6 wins):

- Willie Carson – Cistus (1978), Height of Fashion (1982), Oumaldaaya (1992), Gisarne (1993), Bulaxie (1994), Subya (1995)

Leading trainer (6 wins):

- John Dunlop – Oumaldaaya (1992), Gisarne (1993), Bulaxie (1994), Subya (1995), Claxon (1999), Beatrice Aurore (2011)

== Winners ==
Year	Winner	Jockey	Trainer	Time
1972	Star Ship	Tony Murray	Ryan Price	2:11.83
1973	Rosolini	Ron Hutchinson	Peter Nelson	2:12.11
1974	Northern Princess	Tony Kimberley	Jeremy Hindley	2:16.66
1975	Misoptimist	Tony Kimberley	Jeremy Hindley	2:14.27
1976	Laughing Girl	Pat Eddery	Harry Wragg	2:13.75
1977	Western Star	Pat Eddery	Peter Walwyn	2:11.34
1978	Cistus	Willie Carson	Dick Hern	2:05.64
1979	Britannia's Rule	Philip Waldron	Henry Candy	2:14.65
1980 (Note: The 1980 running took place at Kempton Park)	Vielle	Geoff Baxter	Bruce Hobbs	2:03.56
1981	Golden Bowl	John Matthias	Ian Balding	2:51.55
1982	Height of Fashion	Willie Carson	Dick Hern	2:39.62
1983	Current Raiser	Tony Ives	Clive Brittain	2:51.62
1984	Miss Beaulieu	Lester Piggott	Geoff Wragg	2:07.31
1985	Bella Colora	Walter Swinburn	Michael Stoute	2:10.02
1986	Tralthee	Pat Eddery	Luca Cumani	2:20.29
1987	Scimitarra	Steve Cauthen	Henry Cecil	2:05.47
1988	Miss Boniface	Michael Roberts	Paul Kelleway	2:11.11
1989	Lady Shipley	Greville Starkey	Michael Stoute	2:06.95
1990	Moon Cactus	Steve Cauthen	Henry Cecil	2:09.34
1991	Fragrant Hill	Ray Cochrane	Ian Balding	2:11.48
1992	Oumaldaaya	Willie Carson	John Dunlop	2:08.73
1993	Gisarne	Willie Carson	John Dunlop	2:10.15
1994	Bulaxie	Willie Carson	John Dunlop	2:14.53
1995	Subya	Willie Carson	John Dunlop	2:09.31
1996	Whitewater Affair	Ray Cochrane	Michael Stoute	2:15.51
1997	Maid of Camelot	Tim Sprake	Roger Charlton	2:13.26
1998	Napoleon's Sister	Kieren Fallon	David Elsworth	2:07.22
1999	Claxon	Pat Eddery	John Dunlop	2:07.50
2000	Love Divine	Richard Quinn	Henry Cecil	2:10.52
2001	Foodbroker Fancy	Dane O'Neill	David Elsworth	2:05.97
2002	Mellow Park	Darryll Holland	Jeremy Noseda	2:08.98
2003	Ocean Silk	Jimmy Fortune	John Gosden	2:08.57
2004	Halicardia	Darryll Holland	Peter Harris	2:07.13
2005	Something Exciting	Richard Quinn	David Elsworth	2:08.07
2006 (dh)	Rising Cross; Soft Centre	George Baker; Dane O'Neill	John Best; Amanda Perrett	2:09.67
2007	Cosmodrome	Nicky Mackay	Luca Cumani	2:07.52
2008	Michita	Jimmy Fortune	John Gosden	2:07.45
2009	Moneycantbuymelove	Jamie Spencer	Michael Bell	2:07.91
2010	Snow Fairy	Eddie Ahern	Ed Dunlop	2:06.92
2011	Beatrice Aurore	Ted Durcan	John Dunlop	2:07.63
2012	Coquet	Robert Havlin	Hughie Morrison	2:07.34
2013	Elik	Ryan Moore	Sir Michael Stoute	2:07.34
2014	Marsh Daisy	Pat Dobbs	Hughie Morrison	2:11.59
2015	Lady Of Dubai	Adam Kirby	Luca Cumani	2:07.76
2016	Skiffle	William Buick	Charlie Appleby	2:08.67
2017	Mori	Ryan Moore	Sir Michael Stoute	2:06.40
2018	Magnolia Springs	Charles Bishop	Eve Johnson Houghton	2:08.80
2019	Aloe Vera	Harry Bentley	Ralph Beckett	2:07.50
	no race 2020 (Note: The 2020 running was cancelled because of the COVID-19 pandemic in the United Kingdom)
2021	Ad Infinitum	Jamie Spencer	David Simcock	2:15.90
2022	Sea Silk Road	Tom Marquand	William Haggas	2:11.55
2023	Araminta	Trevor Whelan	Henry Candy	2:06.49
2024	Francophone	Joe Fanning	Charlie Johnston	2:06.71
2025	Victoria Harbour	Pierre-Louis Jamin	Karl Burke	2:10.67
2026	Inis Mor	Saffie Osborne	David Menuisier	2:09.26

== See also ==
- Horse racing in Great Britain
- List of British flat horse races
- Recurring sporting events established in 1972 – this race is included under its original title, Lupe Stakes.
