= Eswarah =

British-bred Thoroughbred racehorse

- Racing silks of Hamdan Al Maktoum
- Sire: Unfuwain
- Grandsire: Northern Dancer
- Dam: Midway Lady
- Damsire: Alleged
- Sex: Mare
- Foaled: 21 April 2002
- Country: United Kingdom
- Colour: Bay
- Breeder: Shadwell Estate
- Owner: Hamdan Al Maktoum
- Trainer: Michael Jarvis
- Record: 5: 3-0-0
- Earnings: £258,395

Major wins
- Fillies' Trial Stakes (2005); Epsom Oaks (2005)

Eswarah (foaled 21 April 2002) is a British Thoroughbred racehorse and broodmare best known for winning the 2005 Epsom Oaks. In a racing career which lasted from April to August 2005 the filly ran five times and won three races. Unraced as a two-year-old, Eswarah won her first three races as a three-year-old culminating with a win in the Classic Oaks over one and a half miles at Epsom. In her two subsequent appearances she finished eighth in the King George VI and Queen Elizabeth Stakes and fourth in the Yorkshire Oaks.

== Background ==
Eswarah is a bay mare with a white star and a white sock on her left hind leg, bred by her owner Hamdan Al Maktoum's Shadwell Estate. Her sire, Unfuwain was a high-class middle-distance runner who won four Group races before siring the winners of more than five hundred winners at stud. He was particularly successful with fillies: his daughters included Lahan (1,000 Guineas Stakes), Petrushka (Irish Oaks, Yorkshire Oaks, Prix de l'Opéra), Lailani (Irish Oaks, Nassau Stakes, Flower Bowl Invitational Handicap), Zahrat Dubai (Nassau Stakes) and Bolas (Irish Oaks). Eswarah's dam Midway Lady was a successful racemare, winning the 1000 Guineas and the Oaks in 1986 before producing several winners at stud.

Eswarah was originally sent to be trained at Newmarket, Suffolk by Ben Hanbury, who had trained Midway Lady, but when Hanbury retired at the end of 2004, the filly, who had yet to race, was moved to the stables of Michael Jarvis. Eswarah, whose name is Arabic for "bracelet" was ridden in all of her races by Richard Hills.

== Racing career ==
Eswarah made her first appearance in a ten furlong maiden race at Newbury in April 2005. Starting the 5/2 favourite against fifteen other fillies, Eswarah took the lead a furlong from the finish and won by two and a half lengths from Alumni. Four weeks later, Eswarah was moved up to Listed class for the Fillies' Trial Stakes over the same course and distance. Starting at odds of 1/2, Eswarah went clear of the field in the straight and won very easily by two lengths.

On 3 June Eswarah started 11/4 joint favourite for the Oaks at Epsom, level in the betting with the 1000 Guineas winner Virginia Waters, despite being the least experienced and "about the smallest". Richard Hills settled the filly on the outside of the field of twelve runners and turned into the straight in fifth place. Hills explained that he kept the inexperienced filly well away from the inside rail to avoid and bumping or interference. Eswarah moved into the lead two furlongs from the finish and was driven out by Hills to win by one and a half lengths from the David Elsworth-trained Something Exciting. There was a gap of three lengths to Pictavia, who beat Virginia Waters by a length for third. The win was a second classic of Michael Jarvis's long career following Ameerat's success in the 2001 1000 Guineas. After the race he described Eswarah as an exceptional filly and named the Irish Oaks and the Yorkshire Oaks as likely future targets.

Eswarah was then given a break of seven weeks before returning in Britain's most prestigious all-aged race, the King George VI and Queen Elizabeth Stakes. Her connections cited the filly's improving form and the generous weight-for-age concessions she would receive from her opponents as the main reasons for decision to run. As Ascot Racecourse was being redeveloped, the 2005 King George was run at Newbury Racecourse and Eswarah was the only three-year-old in the twelve runner field starting at odds of 9/1. After looking to be going well early in the straight, Eswarah weakened in the closing stages and finished eighth behind Azamour, beaten eighteen lengths. In the Yorkshire Oaks at York Racecourse in August, Eswarah led briefly a furlong from the finish but faded into fourth place behind the four-year-old Punctilious. After this disappointing performance x-ray examinations revealed a bone chip in the filly's knee and her retirement from racing was announced in September. Jarvis commented that despite Eswarah's win in the Oaks, which he described as "the highlight of my career", the filly had never been suited by the firm ground which had prevailed that summer.

== Assessment and honours ==
In the 2005 World Thoroughbred Racehorse Rankings, Eswarah was given a rating of 115, making her the equal sixth best three-year-old filly in the world seven pounds below Divine Proportions.

The filly received an unusual honour when property developers named a new housing estate in Epsom Eswarah House.

== Stud record ==
Eswarah was retired to become a broodmare for the Shadwell Stud. Her progeny include Firdaws, a filly sired by Kingmambo, who won one race and finished third in the Group One Fillies' Mile in 2011.

2007 Sheklaan (USA) : Bay colt, foaled 22 February, by Kingmambo (USA) – unplaced in five races in England and Dubai 2010/11

2008

2009 Firdaws (USA) : Bay filly, 26 February, by Mr Greeley (USA) – won 1 race and 3rd G1 Fillies' Mile, Newmarket in England 2011–12

2010 Qawaafy (USA) : Bay filly, foaled 1 March, by Street Cry (IRE) – won 1 race and placed 2nd three times from seven starts in England 2012/13

2013 Elraazy (GB) : Bay filly, foaled 28 April, by Dubawi (IRE) – won 1 race from 2 starts to date (1/09/16) in England 2016

2015 Filly by Sea the Stars (IRE)

== Pedigree ==
Pedigree of Eswarah (GB), bay mare, 2002
Sire Unfuwain (USA) 1985	Northern Dancer; 1961	Nearctic	Nearco
Sire Unfuwain (USA) 1985	Northern Dancer; 1961	Nearctic	Lady Angela
Sire Unfuwain (USA) 1985	Northern Dancer; 1961	Natalma	Native Dancer
Sire Unfuwain (USA) 1985	Northern Dancer; 1961	Natalma	Almahmoud
Sire Unfuwain (USA) 1985	Height of Fashion; 1979	Bustino	Busted
Sire Unfuwain (USA) 1985	Height of Fashion; 1979	Bustino	Ship Yard
Sire Unfuwain (USA) 1985	Height of Fashion; 1979	Highclere	Queen's Hussar
Sire Unfuwain (USA) 1985	Height of Fashion; 1979	Highclere	Highlight
Dam Midway Lady (USA) 1983	Alleged; 1974	Hoist The Flag	Tom Rolfe
Dam Midway Lady (USA) 1983	Alleged; 1974	Hoist The Flag	Wavy Navy
Dam Midway Lady (USA) 1983	Alleged; 1974	Princess Pout	Prince John
Dam Midway Lady (USA) 1983	Alleged; 1974	Princess Pout	Determined Lady
Dam Midway Lady (USA) 1983	Smooth Bore; 1976	His Majesty	Ribot
Dam Midway Lady (USA) 1983	Smooth Bore; 1976	His Majesty	Flower Bowl
Dam Midway Lady (USA) 1983	Smooth Bore; 1976	French Leave	Damascus
Dam Midway Lady (USA) 1983	Smooth Bore; 1976	French Leave	Marche Lorraine (Family: 8-k)
