= Brigadier Gerard (horse) =

British-bred Thoroughbred racehorse (1968–1989)

- Sire: Queen's Hussar
- Grandsire: March Past
- Dam: La Paiva
- Damsire: Prince Chevalier
- Sex: Stallion
- Foaled: 5 March 1968
- Country: Great Britain
- Colour: Bay
- Breeder: John L. Hislop
- Owner: Mr & Mrs. John L. Hislop
- Trainer: Dick Hern
- Record: 18: 17-1-0
- Earnings: £253,024.70

Major wins
- Washington Singer Stakes (1970); Middle Park Stakes (1970); 2000 Guineas (1971); St. James's Palace Stakes (1971); Sussex Stakes (1971); Goodwood Mile (1971); Queen Elizabeth II Stakes (1971 & 1972); Champion Stakes (1971 & 1972); Westbury Stakes (1972); Lockinge Stakes (1972); Prince of Wales's Stakes (1972); Eclipse Stakes (1972); K. George VI & Q. Elizabeth Stakes (1972)

Awards
- British Horse of the Year (1972); Timeform top-rated horse (1971 (equal), 1972)

Honours
- Timeform rating: 144; Brigadier Gerard Stakes at Sandown Park
- Last updated on 7 May 2025

Brigadier Gerard (5 March 1968 – 29 October 1989) was a British Thoroughbred racehorse and sire. In a racing career which lasted from June 1970 until October 1972, he won seventeen of his eighteen races. He was rated by Timeform as the joint best racehorse trained in Britain in the 20th century with Tudor Minstrel, and joint 3rd racehorse of all-time behind only Frankel and Sea Bird.

Brigadier Gerard was unbeaten as a two-year-old in 1970, when his most important win came in the Middle Park Stakes. At three he was again unbeaten, defeating Mill Reef in a famous race for the 2000 Guineas and going on to win the St. James's Palace Stakes, Sussex Stakes, Goodwood Mile and Queen Elizabeth II Stakes over a mile, before moving up in distance to win the Champion Stakes over ten furlongs. As a four-year-old he won the Lockinge Stakes, Prince of Wales's Stakes and Eclipse Stakes before moving up in distance to win the King George VI and Queen Elizabeth Stakes over 1 1/2 miles. Brigadier Gerard sustained his only defeat when beaten by Roberto in the inaugural running of the Benson and Hedges Gold Cup.

== Background ==
Bred by John Hislop in England and foaled on 5 March 1968, Brigadier Gerard was a son of the stallion Queen's Hussar, winner of the Sussex Stakes and the Lockinge Stakes, and the non-winning racemare, La Paiva, a daughter of Prince Chevalier. On his female side he traced back to the Fillies' Triple Crown winner Pretty Polly, who was his fifth dam. This bay colt was named after the Arthur Conan Doyle character. Brigadier Gerard had good conformation and stood 16 hands 2 inches high. Brigadier Gerard was trained during his racing career by Major Dick Hern and ridden in all his races by Joe Mercer.

== Racing career ==
=== 1970: two-year-old season ===
==== Berkshire Stakes ====
Brigadier Gerard began his career as a two-year-old on 24 June 1970 in the Berkshire Stakes at Newbury. The race was run on good ground over five furlongs and attracted a field of five runners, including three previous winners. Brigadier Gerard was ridden by Joe Mercer and was relatively unfancied at odds of 100/7.

In the race, Mercer sat behind the more experienced runners until approaching the two-furlong markers where Brigadier Gerard took the lead to win by five lengths. John Lawrence in the Daily Telegraph wrote: "This was the big bay colts first race, but showing no sign of inexperience he proceeded to treat his opponents, including three previous winners, with total disrespect."

==== Champagne Stakes ====
Brigadier Gerard's owners decided to run him eight days later on 2 July in the Champagne Stakes over six furlongs at Salisbury. Carrying a penalty for his previous win Brigadier Gerard was favourite at 13 to 8 on. Another success, by 4 lengths, ensued.

==== Washington Singer Stakes ====
Having had two races in quick succession, Brigadier Gerard was given a six-week break before reappearing in the Washington Singer Stakes at Newbury on 15 August. Starting favourite at odds of 4/9 and carrying a penalty, he won by two lengths from Comedy Star.

==== Middle Park Stakes ====
Following three successes, Brigadier Gerard was entered in the Middle Park Stakes at Newmarket, run over six furlongs for a value of £10,515 18s. The opposition included Mummy's Pet, unbeaten in his three starts including the Hyperion Stakes and Norfolk Stakes, and Swing Easy, winner of three of his four starts including the New Stakes at Royal Ascot, July Stakes at Newmarket and the Richmond Stakes at Goodwood, his only defeat being at the hands of My Swallow in the Prix de la Salamandre at Longchamp. Mummy's Pet started favourite at 6/5 on, with Swing Easy at 9/4 and Brigadier Gerard at 11/2. After a slow early pace, Joe Mercer allowed Brigadier Gerard to stride into the lead, where he drew steadily clear to win easing down by three lengths from Mummy's Pet with Swing Easy a further half a length away in third place. Len Thomas, The Sporting Life, wrote: "Yesterday, in the Middle Park Stakes, the early pace was very slow for the first couple of furlongs but when Brigadier Gerard reached the incline he settled the issue in a few strides to win impressively. It was interesting to note Brigadier Gerard finished the same distance ahead of Swing Easy as did My Swallow in the Prix de la Salamandre at Longchamp recently". Owner John Hislop wrote: "It was a truly thrilling moment. To have won the Middle Park Stakes was a triumph in itself, but for the Brigadier to have slaughtered the opposition in this way was unbelievable. His right to contest the Two Thousand Guineas has been won with honours."

As three-year-olds, Mummy's Pet and Swing Easy remained at sprinting, winning, among other successes, the Sceptre Stakes, Temple Stakes, Daniel Prenn, King's Stand Stakes, and Nunthorpe Stakes.

=== 1971: three-year-old season ===
==== 2000 Guineas ====
The field of six runners for the season's first colts' classic, the 2000 Guineas at Newmarket, was one of the smallest in recent memory. However, the three colts that had headed the Free handicap, My Swallow, Mill Reef, and Brigadier Gerard, had between them won 18 of their 19 races, including every major two-year-old race in Europe. My Swallow, unbeaten in eight races as a two-year-old, and Mill Reef, winner of five of his six races as a two-year-old, including the Coventry Stakes at Royal Ascot, Gimcrack Stakes at York, and Dewhurst Stakes at [Newmarket, had won their prep races, the Usher Stakes at Kempton Park and the Greenham Stakes at Newbury. Brigadier Gerard, as planned, arrived at the Rowley Mile without a preparatory race. The race was generally billed as a match between the 6/4 favourite Mill Reef and the 2/1 second favourite My Swallow. Brigadier Gerard was relatively overlooked at 11/2. The other runners were Minsky, a full brother to Nijinsky and Irish champion 2-y-o in 1970 at 15/2, Good Bond at 16/1, and Indian Ruler, the complete outsider at 100/1.

In the race, My Swallow made the early running from Mill Reef until they came together, three furlongs from home. At this point, neither Geoff Lewis on Mill Reef nor Frankie Durr, on My Swallow had asked their charges any serious questions. When Joe Mercer asked Brigadier Gerard to close the gap on the two leaders, the response was immediate. With under three furlongs left to run, Brigadier Gerard drew alongside Mill Reef before striding away to win by three lengths. My Swallow was 3/4 length back in third, and Minsky finished fourth.

Mill Reef was not beaten again, winning The Derby, Eclipse Stakes, King George VI & Queen Elizabeth Stakes, Prix de l'Arc de Triomphe, Prix Ganay, and Coronation Cup. He was retired to stud after suffering a serious leg injury on the gallops. My Swallow ran twice more. He dropped back in distance to contest the Prix de la Porte Maillot at Longchamp, finishing 2nd to top French miler Faraway Son. Then, 11 days later, he contested the July Cup at Newmarket, where he was beaten narrowly by Realm. He was then retired to stud having won 9 of his 12 races in just under 14 months. Minsky, winner of four of his 7 races, went to North America, where he won several races.

==== St James's Palace Stakes ====
The weather had been so bad it was questionable whether racing would go ahead on the first day of Royal Ascot. As the St James's Palace Stakes was the last race on the card, it would be run in the worst of the going. Only four runners were declared, including the main danger, Sparkler. Trained by Sam Armstrong and ridden by Lester Piggott, Sparkler was a very good two-year-old rated 8lbs behind the very best of his age including My Swallow, Mill Reef, and Brigadier Gerard. As a three-year-old, he had won the Thirsk Classic Trial before being beaten, some thought unluckily and following a stewards enquiry, in the Irish 2000 Guineas. Sparkler had subsequently won the Diomed Stakes at Epsom. Good Bond, a long way behind Brigadier Gerard in the 2000 Guineas, and Ballyhot, a maiden winner, completed the field. Brigadier Gerard started at odds of 4/11.

In the prevailing conditions, the visibility was poor. Sparkler made the running until the two-furlong marker where Joe Mercer brought Brigadier Gerard to challenge. Some viewers suggested the Brigadier hit a patch of false ground and lost 6 lengths. Mercer had picked him up and renewed his challenge, catching Sparkler 25 yards from the line to win going away. "After the race, John Hislop confirmed that his plans for Brigadier Gerard depended, in part at least, on Mr David Robinson, owner of My Swallow. John Hislop had offered him the chance of revenge for his colts defeat in the 2000 Guineas if he ran his colt in the July Cup. When the offer was not accepted the decision was made to run Brigadier Gerard next in the Sussex Stakes at Goodwood" (John Lawrence, Daily Telegraph).

==== Sussex Stakes ====
Heavy rain on the Tuesday and plenty more in the hour before racing had made the going at Goodwood not as deep as Royal Ascot, but still considered to be much to the disadvantage of Brigadier Gerard. The four-year-olds were well represented. Leading the opposition was French challenger and soft-ground specialist Faraway Son who, as a three-year-old, had finished first but was disqualified in the Poule d'Essai des Poulains (French 2000 Guineas) in favour of French horse Caro, whose only defeat this season had been by Mill Reef in the Eclipse Stakes. Faraway Son had also just beaten the 2000 Guineas third, My Swallow, by six lengths at Longchamp. Joshua had won three times from his four starts with a very narrow defeat in the Lockinge Stakes by top miler Welsh Pageant being his only blot on his season. The three-year-old division was also well represented by King's Company and Ashleigh. King's Company, the second highest rated two-year-old in Ireland, had won the Irish 2000 Guineas in somewhat controversial circumstances, in course record time, and by the narrowest of margins from Sparkler. He had, more recently, won the Cork and Orrery Stakes at Royal Ascot. Ashleigh, highly regarded by his trainer, Paddy Prendergast, had won the Jersey Stakes at Royal Ascot on his only run this season.

As a result of prevailing conditions, Joe Mercer allowed Brigadier Gerard to stroll along at the head of affairs until approaching the furlong maker, where Faraway Son and Joshua threw down their challenges. Brigadier Gerard pulled away to win by 5 lengths from Faraway Son, with the finishing time two seconds outside the course record. Faraway Son was not beaten again. He next won the Prix du Rond Point (beating Poule d'Essai des Pouliches (French 1000 Guineas) winner Bold Fascinator), the Prix du Moulin de Longchamp, and the Prix de la Foret.

==== Goodwood Mile ====
A small field contested the Goodwood Mile run in damp, wintry conditions. Only two horses opposed Brigadier Gerard: Gold Rod and Ashleigh, resulting in the favourite's cramped odds of 1/6. In 1970, Gold Rod was extensively campaigned, running 12 times and winning three including the Prix du Moulin de Longchamp. It took the best milers in this country to prevent him from also winning the St James's Palace Stakes, [Sussex Stakes and Queen Elizabeth II Stakes. Ashleigh, having his third run of the season, had won the Jersey Stakes at Royal Ascot before losing to Brigadier Gerard in the Sussex Stakes.

In the race, Brigadier Gerard made the running, then quickened at the two-furlong mark to win by 10 lengths. Gold Rod beat Ashleigh by four lengths for the runner-up spot.

==== Queen Elizabeth II Stakes ====
Another small field contested this race run before a bumper cowd at Ascot. In opposition was leading French challenger Dictus, fourth in last season's Champion Stakes just behind Nijinsky, and now fresh from victory in the Prix Jacques le Marois at Deauville, where he defeated Sparkler by half a length. And to complete the three runners was Ashleigh, whose two previous defeats were at the hands of Brigadier Gerard. Starting at odds of 2/11, Brigadier Gerard beat Dictus by eight lengths in near course record time.

==== Champion Stakes ====
Following Brigadier Gerard's narrow success in the St James's Palace Stakes at Royal Ascot, he lined up for his first attempt at ten furlongs in conditions rapidly approaching those he encountered that day at Ascot. Brigadier Gerard's owner had stated that they would never run him in such conditions as he had encountered at Ascot, but with huge crowds turning up to watch him run they did not want to disappoint them. A field of ten contested the £35,000 prize. From Great Britain, the leading older horses included Welsh Pageant, who was having his fourth run of the season, winning the Lockinge Stakes and Hungerford Stakes and he had finished third in the Eclipse Stakes behind Mill Reef and Caro. Gold Rod was fresh from his win in the Prix La Coupe, where he had exacted revenge on Amadou, who had finished 5 lengths in front of him in the Prix Ganay. Great Wall (fourth to Nijinsky in the Epsom Derby), Leander (winner of the Prix Jean Prat at Chantilly as a three-year-old), and Tamil winner of a minor event at Deauville. From France came Tratteggio, trained by Alec Head, having just won the Prix Henri Delamere by 6 lengths, Amadou who had run Caro, the best older horse in France, very close before being beaten narrowly by Gold Rod and Roi Soliel, a mud lover, who had won the Queen Anne Stakes at Royal Ascot before being narrowly defeated by Dictus and Gold Rod in the[Prix Jacques le Marois. From Ireland came Rarity, trained by Paddy Prendergast and ridden by Pat Eddery. This lightly raced four-year-old had shown a distinct preference for soft ground. In his last race, the Desmond Stakes at the Curragh, he had beaten Lombardo by 4 lengths in similar conditions. Lombardo boasted Epsom Derby form, having been beaten into 4th place at Epsom, 6 lengths behind Mill Reef, and was then beaten 3 lengths into 2nd place in the Irish Derby at the Curragh by the Epsom Derby third, Irish Ball.

The rain had continued throughout the day and the race itself was run in very poor visibility and in very soft underfoot conditions. In the race Welsh Pageant, Leander, Gold Rod and Roi Soleil were all in the leading group with Brigadier Gerard behind them. As they entered the dip three furlongs from home, Brigadier Gerard moved into the lead and pulled three lengths clear. On reaching the rising ground, Rarity made progress on the outside, where Brigadier Gerard held on to win by a short head with Welsh Pageant 2 1/2 lengths away in third. After the race, Brigadier Gerard's owners declared they would not run again in similar, testing, underfoot conditions.

The 1971 season ended with Brigadier Gerard maintaining his unbeaten record with 10 wins. He became the first English classic winner since Ormonde, who was foaled in 1883, to be unbeaten in 10 or more races. Mill Reef also remained unbeaten since their meeting in the 2000 Guineas at Newmarket. The scene was now set for a showdown between these two in the 1972 Eclipse Stakes at Sandown Park run over ten furlongs. It was advertised widely as the Race of the Century.

=== 1972: four-year-old season ===
==== Lockinge Stakes ====
On 20 May, on good ground, Brigadier Gerard made his first appearance of the season where a field of five runners contested this Group 2 race run on the straight mile at Newbury. With a new introduction to his pre-arranged racing schedule, the Westbury Stakes at Sandown Park, requiring Brigadier Gerard to return to the racecourse in nine days, the instructions given to his jockey were to win but be given as easy a race as was possible. Brigadier Gerard, who started at odds of 2/7, was accompanied to the start by older horses Gold Rod, level weights, who the Brigadier had beaten in their two previous meetings, and Leander, a useful handicapper who was in receipt of seven pounds for not winning a Group 1 race. Two three years olds, Grey Mirage and Crespinall, made up the five runners and were in receipt of 22lbs and 25lbs respectively. Grey Mirage had just won two classic trials by wide margins and had finished 8th in the Two Thousand Guineas at Newmarket. Crespinall had just won a Group 3 race at Epsom and subsequently won the Nassau Stakes at Goodwood. The race was uneventful. Crespinall made the running until Brigadier Gerard took over four furlongs from home to win pushed out. Grey Mirage finished 2 1/2 lengths away in second, with Gold Rod a further eight lengths away in third.

==== Westbury Stakes ====
On 29 May, Brigadier Gerard ran in the Group 3 Westbury Stakes at Sandown Park run over 10 furlongs, with a view to gaining experience of the Sandown Park racecourse prior to his long-awaited meeting with Mill Reef in the Eclipse Stakes on 8 July. Carrying 9st 10lbs he was set to give 10lbs to three of his rivals, Fair World, Pembroke Castle and Juggernaut and 14lbs to the fourth, Ballyhot. Timeform pointed out: "The task he faced was a tough one and by our reckoning he was no certainty". Brigadier Gerard started at odds of 4/9. Ballyhot made the early running at a steady pace before quickening in the home straight, where Brigadier Gerard moved into 2nd place and, running on well under hands and heels riding only, led inside the final furlong for a half-length success. Before the race Brian Taylor, Ballyhot's jockey, had expressed the view that Brigadier Gerard could not give a stone to a horse as good as Ballyhot. Afterwards he remarked that race may have done Brigadier Gerard a lot of good but it won't have done Ballyhot any good at all. In his next race Ballyhot finished third, in the Group 1 Prix d'Ispahan at Longchamp, behind Riverman. After the race owner was to John Hislop declared, "Having not been fully tuned up at home it was a relief to hear Joe Mercer express himself well satisfied with the Brigadier’s two preliminary races".

==== Prince of Wales Stakes ====
Two days before the Prince of Wales's Stakes, Joe Mercer was involved in a plane crash when travelling to Brussels. He was thrown clear but returned to help rescue his fellow passengers, although the pilot was killed. Mercer had to pass a fitness test on the day of the race, with Jimmy Lindley standing by to replace him. On 20 June, on good ground, facing six opponents and ridden by Mercer, Brigadier Gerard lined up for the Group 2, Prince of Wales Stakes. Three older horses, Pembroke Castle, Prominent, and Lord David, in receipt of 4lbs, 4lbs, and 6lbs respectively and three-year-olds Steel Pulse, Pardner, and The Broker in receipt of 19lbs, 22lbs and 26lbs respectively, completed the line-up. When interviewed by John Trickett, Daily Express, jockey Geoff Baxter, riding front-runner Prominent confirmed that he was intending to ensure Brigadier Gerard stayed the distance well. "You can say I will be riding Prominent in the usual way" he said. "I will let him bowl along at his own pace. And if the Brigadier beats us you will know for sure that he genuinely gets the mile and a quarter". Brigadier Gerard started favourite at odds of 1/2. Prominent made the running and led into the home straight with Brigadier Gerard two lengths behind him with Steel Pulse in third place. Bursting clear, Brigadier Gerard came home in course record time to win by 5 lengths from Steel Pulse with Pembroke Castle finishing third.

A week later and ten days before the Eclipse Stakes, the race billed as the "Race of the Century", Balding declared that Mill Reef was suffering from a virus and was withdrawn.

==== Eclipse Stakes ====
On 8 July, 19 days after the Prince of Wales Stakes, Brigadier Gerard lined up for the Group 1 Eclipse Stakes at Sandown Park. As the race approached, following the defection of Mill Reef from the line-up and with the going at Sandown Park predicted as being on the fast side of good, odds of 1/10 were available. Then, on the Friday afternoon, it started raining heavily. Following the Champion Stakes at Newmarket Brigadier Gerard's owners had stated that they would never race their horse again in similar conditions but, with so many tickets sold for this contest they decided to let him take his place. While all the time keeping a close eye on the fact that there was still the real possibility of meeting Mill Reef in the King George VI & Queen Elizabeth Stakes at Ascot two weeks later. As a result of the rain continuing to fall heavily, the ground became so bad that only 27 runners stood their ground on the day's card. The Eclipse Stakes had the biggest field of the day with 6 runners. Owner, John Hislop and trainer Major Dick Hern walked the course before racing and advised jockey Joe Mercer to keep toward the centre of the course up the home straight. The five runners facing Brigadier Gerard included three older horses, Charladouce, Gold Rod, and Lord David all carrying 9st 5lbs with two 3-year-olds Alonso and Home Guard carrying 8st 7lbs.

Brigadier Gerard started at odds of 4/11. Charladouce made the early running from Gold Rod with Brigadier Gerard in third place. At the two furlong marker, Charladouce dropped away and Brigadier Gerard took over with Lord David challenging, Gold Rod running on, and Home Guard trying to come through with a late run. Brigadier Gerard slogged on through the rain followed by Gold Rod and Home Guard. The race took very little out of the Brigadier who, according to his trainer Dick Hern, only lost 8lbs. After a couple of easy days it was confirmed by his connections that Brigadier Gerard's next race would indeed be in the King George VI and Queen Elizabeth Stakes at Ascot where he would step up to 12 furlongs for the first time in his career.

==== King George VI & Queen Elizabeth Stakes ====
Brigadier Gerard, in this weight-for-age clash would be conceding 14lbs to the three-year-olds. On Saturday 21 July on good going following overnight rain, Brigadier Gerard lined up for the King George VI and Queen Elizabeth Stakes at Ascot. There were nine runners, four 4-year-olds and five 3-year-olds, and this was Brigadier Gerard's fifth race in nine weeks. The first three in the betting had run 27 times, winning 26 and one second by a neck. The field included five individual classic winners. Parnell had run 12 times as a three-year-old, winning seven, including the Irish St Leger by four lengths. He had a good record at Ascot, running twice and winning on both occasions. First in the Queen's Vase at Royal Ascot beating 19 opponents and next, this season, first time out winning the Rouge Dragon handicap, carrying 9st 13lbs, by 8 lengths in a canter. Also, this season, he had won the Prix Jean Prat at Longchamp before being beaten narrowly by Rock Roi in the Group 1 Prix du Cadran also at Longchamp. From Italy, ridden by Lester Piggott was Gay Lussac. Unbeaten in 7 races in Italy, including winning the Derby Italiano. Reports were that he was the best horse to come out of Italy since Ribot. From France the three-year-old Riverman, unbeaten in four races this season including the French 2000 Guineas. And Steel Pulse who had finished 5th in the Epsom Derby, after recently changing stables and who subsequently won the Irish Derby beating Scottish Rifle and the Irish 2000 Guineas winner Ballymore. Also included were Selhurst, unbeaten in three races this season, including the Hardwicke Stakes at Ascot, Sukawa, 2nd in the Group 1 Grand Prix de Paris, where he beat Our Mirage by five lengths. Our Mirage had just finished two lengths fourth in Roberto's Epsom Derby. Fair World and Bog Road also ran. Brigadier Gerard started at odds of 8/13.

Drawn wide, in stall one, Brigadier Gerard remained on the outside of the field throughout to ensure a clear run in the home straight. Joe Mercer's instructions were to challenge on entering the home straight. The race was run at a strong pace set by Selhurst for over five furlongs where Parnell took over. Brigadier Gerard moved up behind Parnell before entering the home straight, where he challenged two furlongs out. Leading approaching the final furlong, Brigadier Gerard stayed on strongly for success, missing Mill Reef's course record by 0.3 seconds while carrying 14lbs more. As a result of jockey Willie Carson switching Parnell in the closing stages, a steward's enquiry was called. The head-on patrol film, used for the first time on a British racecourse, showed no interference, there was always room for Parnell to challenge up the rails, and the result was allowed to stand.

==== Benson and Hedges Gold Cup ====
On Tuesday 15 August, on good fast ground and running in his sixth race in 12 weeks, Brigadier Gerard lined up against four opponents in the inaugural running of the Benson & Hedges Gold Cup. Mill Reef had been withdrawn a week earlier, leaving his pacemaker Bright Beam and Brigadier Gerard's old adversary Gold Rod to carry the colours of the older horses. The first and second in the Epsom Derby, Roberto and Rheingold, represented the best of the three-year-old division, and they were the main opposition to the 1/3 favourite. This was the first and only time Brigadier Gerard had raced left-handed.

Vincent O'Brien, Roberto's trainer, had been having difficulty acquiring a jockey to ride him at York. His usual jockey Bill Williamson, who had been 'jocked-off' by Lester Piggott in the Epsom Derby had agreed to ride in Belgium that day and Lester Piggott had turned down the ride in favour of Rheingold, who had recently won the Group 1 Grand Prix de St Cloud. As a result, Vincent had asked Roberto's owner John Galbraith for help, where it was agreed his American jockey Braulio Baeza, a Panamanian, would fly over for the ride. York racecourse wa similar to the United States racecourses, flat and left-handed. Roberto had beaten Rheingold by the narrowest of margins at Epsom where the general consensus was that, at anywhere else but Epsom, he would gain his revenge.

From the outset it was clear that Roberto's jockey wanted to force the pace and when he was joined by Bright Beam, the pair quickly opened up a six length gap to Rheingold, followed by Brigadier Gerard, then Gold Rod. They remained in this order until the entrance to the home straight, where Bright Beam ran wide and dropped away. Baeza now set Roberto alight while Brigadier Gerard had passed Rheingold and entered the long home straight about three lengths behind Roberto. Brigadier Gerard closed the gap on Roberto but on reaching his hindquarters he could make no further inroads, and when they entered the final furlong Mercer eased his mount to finish three lengths behind Roberto. The race time was a record, with both first and second beating the course record. Gold Rod finished in third with Rheingold 4th. Brigadier Gerard was giving 11lbs (weight for age) to Roberto. Following the race, Brigadier Gerard showed signs of carrying a mild virus but with the video tape showing that he had beaten Gold Rod by 17 lengths into third place plus the very fast time suggested Brigadier Gerard must have run close to his best. Vincent O'Brien's assistant trainer, Michael Kauntze, rated Roberto on a par with Nijinsky when on form, and Lester Piggott stated that "he was a champion when things were in his favour". Roberto had weak knees and required a left-handed track to perform to his best. Although an exceptional 2-year-old, he had never shown the York form before and despite producing a brilliant performance in the 1973 Coronation Cup at Epsom in record time, never quite matched it again. Vincent O'Brien's official biographer noted, "It was an electric performance. It was also in a different league to any race Roberto had run before, or would run after". Vincent suggested that Roberto's improvement may have been down to the left-handed nature of York racecourse. Vincent O’Brien had briefed Baeza about Roberto, the other horses in the race and also about the track but left the tactics to the jockey. As Baeza reported later, "Vincent O’Brien didn't give me any instructions. He just said 'you're the rider, do what you think is best', though he did say that if the pace was strong it would find out Brigadier Gerard in the last half-mile. Timeform stated that they were unable to give Roberto a rating for this race adding that, although he beat Brigadier Gerard fair and square in the Benson & Hedges Gold Cup at York they were unable to rate Roberto in the same class as Brigadier Gerard.

As a result of the possibility of rain, Brigadier Gerard had also been entered in the Nunthorpe Stakes, a five-furlong sprint race, two days later.

==== Queen Elizabeth II Stakes ====
On 23 September, exactly 5 1/2 weeks after his defeat at York, Brigadier Gerard arrived at Ascot for the Queen Elizabeth II Stakes.

The Hislops had acquired Almagest earlier in the season as a lead horse for the Brigadier in his home work and to travel with him to the racecourse. This time he was entered to ensure the race was run at a suitable pace. Apart from Almagest, two other runners were declared. These were old rival Sparkler, in receipt of 7lbs, who had run Brigadier Gerard close at level weights in the St James Palace Stakes over course and distance and the three-year-old Redundant, fresh from carrying 9st 10lbs to an all the way victory at Sandown Park.

Starting at odds of 4/11 Brigadier Gerard started unusually sluggishly losing about three or four lengths, and brought up the rear. Almagest made the early running at a strong pace but was spent after four furlongs where Redundant took over ahead of Sparkler, Brigadier Gerard and the weakening Almagest. Turning in, Sparkler challenged Redundant on his outside with Brigadier Gerard sitting behind. As Sparkler took the lead approaching the final furlong, Brigadier Gerard moved forward and drew well clear for a six-length success. Brigadier Gerard and Sparkler both beat the old course record. Timeform in 'Racehorses of 1972' summed up the finish. "Mercer had to pull Brigadier Gerard round the two leaders to deliver a challenge about two furlongs out. Responding magnificently, Brigadier Gerard caught the new leader, Sparkler, in twenty strides and, pushed right out strode away in tremendous style to win by six lengths". Adding that Sparkler ran through the line without slackening his pace. John Hislop in The Brigadier wrote: "As usual, the Brigadier took about three strides to reach full momentum. As he attained it, he was coming into the last furlong and from there he left Sparkler standing, opening up an ever-increasing gap till, at the post, he was six lengths clear. It was a staggering performance".

==== Champion Stakes ====
On 14 October, Brigadier Gerard lined up for his eighth top-class race in 21 weeks. His races were run over a range of distances between one mile and twelve furlongs and a range of goings between firm and heavy. And, according to his trainer Dick Hern he never missed a day's work. Eight horses opposed the Brigadier, including two three-year-old classic winners Riverman and Steel Pulse who were in receipt of 7lbs. Boreen, Lord David, Jimsun, Sol Argent and L’Apache fell just below Group 1 standard and the Brigadier's stable companion Almagest made up the field.

Almagest set the pace for four furlongs where Steel Pulse took over followed by Brigadier Gerard. Approaching the final three furlongs Brigadier Gerard pulled his way to the front and quickly established a clear lead. Riverman, who had not run since being defeated by the Brigadier in the King George, 12 weeks previously, came out of the pack to chase. The result was never in any doubt allowing the Brigadier to end his career with his 17th win in 18 starts.

Brigadier Gerard's four-year-old season began somewhat inauspiciously. With the main target being a renewed match with Mill Reef in the Eclipse Stakes at Sandown Park on 8 July, a meeting widely publicised as 'The race of the Century', it was important that Brigadier Gerard gained experience of Sandown Park racecourse beforehand. For this reason the provisional programme, planned by his owners John and Jean Hislop, was to start with the Coronation Stakes, run at Sandown Park, in April. He would then run in the Lockinge Stakes at Newbury followed by the Prince of Wales Stakes at Royal Ascot before his date with destiny in the Eclipse Stakes at Sandown Park. Then, following a short break, he would run in the Benson and Hedges Gold Cup, (now the International Stakes) at York, the Queen Elizabeth II Stakes at Ascot before ending his career with a repeat win in the Champion Stakes at Newmarket. In his book, The Brigadier, John Hislop wrote that everything was going according to plan and on schedule until the Brigadier was mistakenly withdrawn from the Coronation Stakes at Sandown Park, just before the four-day stage, because of the likely soft ground. As it happened, the ground dried appreciably and the going was perfect on the day the race was run; however, the repercussions of this decision significantly undermined Brigadier Gerard's pre-planned schedule. Starting his season a month later than originally planned resulted in him running in four top class races in seven weeks and then, when the King George VI and Queen Elizabeth Stakes was added to the list, it became five top class races in a period of nine weeks.

== Stud record ==
Just over four weeks after his final race Brigadier Gerard was loaded onto the horsebox for the return journey to the headquarters of British racing. This time the destination was Egerton Stud, Newmarket which lies within hailing distance of four of the Brigadier's most memorable successes, the Middle Park Stakes, the 2000 Guineas and two Champion Stakes, all memorable in their own way. Whatever high hopes the syndicate who bought into Brigadier Gerard held the terms and conditions of using his services appeared to be a huge gamble and were strongly criticised in the racing press. The terms and conditions were that only breeders that race their own produce could use his services and any stud that sells yearlings is barred. No-one can know how damaging these rules and conditions were to the Brigadier's stud career with many claiming they were punitive, misguided and Canute-like. Andrew Caulfield of The Sporting Life concluded "Only four British and Irish stallions could claim as good a figure as Brigadier Gerard. These were Rainbow Quest, Sadler's Wells, Kris and Caerleon. With his fertility failing, Brigadier Gerard was retired in 1987. Altogether he sired 320 foals which is less than Saddlers Wells sired in his first six crops".

Brigadier Gerard died in 1989 and his remains are interred in the gardens of the Swynford Hotel (formerly Swynford Paddocks), Six Mile Bottom, Newmarket. He appears in the fifth generation of 2015 US Triple Crown winner American Pharoah's pedigree, via his son, General. With only two Group 1 winners and a total of 25 stakes winners from 14 crops, he has to be regarded as a disappointing sire.

== Assessment and honours ==
Brigadier Gerard was given an end-of-year Timeform rating of 141 in 1971, making him the equal highest rated horse of the year, alongside Mill Reef. He topped the Timeform ratings in 1972 with 144, the joint second highest figure at that time given for a flat racehorse, equal with Tudor Minstrel and one pound behind Sea Bird. The Brigadier Gerard Stakes at Sandown is named in his honour. In the 1972 British Horse of the Year poll conducted by the Racegoers' Club, Brigadier Gerard polled all forty of the available votes, making him the first horse to be unanimously elected to the honour.

John Skeaping, the sculptor with advanced knowledge of equine anatomy, pronounced him as the "best-looking" and "most perfectly formed horse" he had ever seen.

== Pedigree ==
Pedigree of Brigadier Gerard, bay stallion, 1968
Sire Queen's Hussar B. 1960	March Past; Br. 1950	Petition	Fair Trial
Sire Queen's Hussar B. 1960	March Past; Br. 1950	Petition	Art Paper
Sire Queen's Hussar B. 1960	March Past; Br. 1950	Marcelette	William of Valence
Sire Queen's Hussar B. 1960	March Past; Br. 1950	Marcelette	Permavon
Sire Queen's Hussar B. 1960	Jojo; Gr. 1950	Vilmorin	Gold Bridge
Sire Queen's Hussar B. 1960	Jojo; Gr. 1950	Vilmorin	Queen of the Meadows
Sire Queen's Hussar B. 1960	Jojo; Gr. 1950	Fairy Jane	Fair Trial
Sire Queen's Hussar B. 1960	Jojo; Gr. 1950	Fairy Jane	Light Tackle
Dam La Paiva B. 1956	Prince Chevalier; B. 1943	Prince Rose	Rose Prince
Dam La Paiva B. 1956	Prince Chevalier; B. 1943	Prince Rose	Indolence
Dam La Paiva B. 1956	Prince Chevalier; B. 1943	Chevalerie	Abbot's Speed
Dam La Paiva B. 1956	Prince Chevalier; B. 1943	Chevalerie	Kassala
Dam La Paiva B. 1956	Brazen Molly; B. 1940	Horus; Ch. 1926	Papyrus
Dam La Paiva B. 1956	Brazen Molly; B. 1940	Horus; Ch. 1926	Lady Peregrine
Dam La Paiva B. 1956	Brazen Molly; B. 1940	Molly Adare	Phalaris
Dam La Paiva B. 1956	Brazen Molly; B. 1940	Molly Adare	Molly Desmond (Family 14-c)

== Bibliography ==
• 1973. The Brigadier by John Hislop (owner), Martin Secker & Warburg Ltd, ISBN 0436-19700-6

• 1973. Racehorses of 1972 compiled by Phil Bull B.Sc. and Reg Griffin, Portway Press Ltd.

• 2005. Vincent O’Brien. The Official Biography by Jaqueline O’Brien & Ivor Herbert, Bantam Press, ISBN 978-0-553-81739-3

• 2022. BRIGADIER GERARD and Me by Laurie Williamson (groom), Brigustbooks, ISBN 978-1-3999-0193-2

== See also ==
- List of leading Thoroughbred racehorses
- List of racehorses
