= Lahan (horse) =

British-bred Thoroughbred racehorse

- Racing colours of Hamdan Al Maktoum
- Sire: Unfuwain
- Grandsire: Northern Dancer
- Dam: Ballet Shoes
- Damsire: Mr. Prospector
- Sex: Mare
- Foaled: 22 January 1997
- Country: United Kingdom
- Colour: Bay
- Breeder: Shadwell Estates
- Owner: Hamdan Al Maktoum
- Trainer: John Gosden
- Record: 4: 3-0-0
- Earnings: £173,068

Major wins
- Rockfel Stakes (1999); 1000 Guineas (2000)
- Last updated on 25 August 2007

Lahan (1997 – 2014) was a British thoroughbred racehorse. In a brief career which lasted from October 1999 until May 2000 she ran four times and won three races. On the second of her two races in 1999 she won the Rockfel Stakes at Newmarket. In the following spring she won the Classic 1000 Guineas at the same course.

== Background ==
Lahan was a bay mare bred by her owner Hamdan Al Maktoum's Shadwell Estates stud. She was one of many good fillies sired by Unfuwain: others included Petrushka (Irish Oaks), Lailani (Irish Oaks), Zahrat Dubai (Nassau Stakes), Bolas (Irish Oaks), Eswarah (Epsom Oaks) Lahan's dam, Amanah, was a daughter of the Hollywood Starlet Stakes winner Cheval Volant, and a product of the same branch of Thoroughbred Family 8-f which produced Nijinsky and The Minstrel. The filly was sent into training with John Gosden at Manton, Wiltshire.

== Racing career ==
=== 1999: two-year-old season ===
Lahan made her first racecourse appearance in a seven furlong maiden race at Redcar on 2 October. Ridden by Dale Gibson, she started at odds of 10/1 in a field of fifteen fillies and won by half a length. Two weeks later she was moved up in class to contest the Group Two Rockfel Stakes over the same distance at Newmarket. Lahan was made 7/2 joint favourite and won by a neck from Clog Dance. In this race she was ridden for the first time by Richard Hills.

=== 2000: three-year-old season ===
The weather in the early part of 2000 was unusually wet and cold, and Gosden found it difficult to bring his horses to peak fitness. He took the precaution of moving Lahan, a filly he held in very high regard, to a stable next to the yard's boiler in an attempt to keep her warm and comfortable. Lahan began the 2000 season with a run in the Fred Darling Stakes, a recognised trial for the 1000 Guineas run over seven furlongs on soft ground at Newbury Racecourse. Starting the 9/4 favourite, she took the lead quarter of a mile from the finish and looked to be going well, but weakened in the closing stages to finish fourth behind Iftiraas, Glen Rosie and Crimplene. Gosden later said that he had been "really depressed" after the performance until his fourteen-year-old daughter told him that "it was only a horserace". In the 1000 Guineas, on 7 May, Lahan was ridden by Richard Hills and started at odds of 14/1, with Petrushka being made 6/4 favourite. Lahan pulled hard in the early stages before producing a strong run to take the lead a furlong from the finish. She stayed on to win by one and a quarter lengths from the 66/1 outsider Princess Ellen, with Petrushka three lengths further back in third. The win was a notable one for Unfuwain: as well as siring the first and third horses, he was the damsire of the runner-up. After the race Richard Hills said "I set out to track Bintalreef because I thought she was the quick one in the race, but they were going faster on the stands' side and I had to tack straight across to get the cover I needed and it took a couple of furlongs to get her settled. John Gosden got me to ride Lahan from behind in a gallop on Wednesday and what she did there gave me the confidence I needed for today".

Lahan was being prepared for a run in the Coronation Stakes at Royal Ascot when she sustained an injury to her right foreleg. The injury was not thought to be serious, but examinations revealed a stress fracture which forced the filly out for the rest of the season and ended her racing career.

== Breeding career ==
Lahan produced five foals, but did not produce any offspring that won major races. She died in 2014.

== Pedigree ==
Pedigree of Lahan (GB), bay mare, 1997
Sire Unfuwain (USA) 1985	Northern Dancer; 1961	Nearctic	Nearco
Sire Unfuwain (USA) 1985	Northern Dancer; 1961	Nearctic	Lady Angela
Sire Unfuwain (USA) 1985	Northern Dancer; 1961	Natalma	Native Dancer
Sire Unfuwain (USA) 1985	Northern Dancer; 1961	Natalma	Almahmoud
Sire Unfuwain (USA) 1985	Height of Fashion; 1979	Bustino	Busted
Sire Unfuwain (USA) 1985	Height of Fashion; 1979	Bustino	Ship Yard
Sire Unfuwain (USA) 1985	Height of Fashion; 1979	Highclere	Queen's Hussar
Sire Unfuwain (USA) 1985	Height of Fashion; 1979	Highclere	Highlight
Dam Amanah (USA) 1992	Mr. Prospector; 1970	Raise a Native	Native Dancer
Dam Amanah (USA) 1992	Mr. Prospector; 1970	Raise a Native	Raise You
Dam Amanah (USA) 1992	Mr. Prospector; 1970	Gold Digger	Nashua
Dam Amanah (USA) 1992	Mr. Prospector; 1970	Gold Digger	Sequence
Dam Amanah (USA) 1992	Cheval Volant; 1987	Kris S.	Roberto
Dam Amanah (USA) 1992	Cheval Volant; 1987	Kris S.	Sharp Queen
Dam Amanah (USA) 1992	Cheval Volant; 1987	Flight	Barachois
Dam Amanah (USA) 1992	Cheval Volant; 1987	Flight	Bright Merry (Family: 8-f)
