= Petrushka (horse) =

Irish Thoroughbred racehorse

- Sire: Unfuwain
- Grandsire: Northern Dancer
- Dam: Ballet Shoes
- Damsire: Ela-Mana-Mou
- Sex: Mare
- Foaled: 3 May 1997
- Country: Ireland
- Colour: Chestnut
- Breeder: Airlie Stud
- Owner: Highclere Thoroughbred Racing Ltd
- Trainer: Sir Michael Stoute
- Record: 9: 5-0-1
- Earnings: £367,624

Major wins
- Nell Gwyn Stakes (2000); Irish Oaks (2000); Yorkshire Oaks (2000); Prix de l'Opéra (2000)

Awards
- European Champion Three-Year-Old Filly (2000)
- Last updated on August 25, 2007

Petrushka is a retired Thoroughbred racehorse who was bred in Ireland and trained in the United Kingdom during a racing career which lasted from October 1999 to June 2001. She was named European Champion Three-Year-Old Filly at the 2000 Cartier Racing Awards. In her championship season she won four times from seven starts including Group One races is three countries. She won the Irish Oaks against other three-year-old fillies, before beating older fillies and mares in the Yorkshire Oaks in England and the Prix de l'Opéra in France. Petrushka was retired to stud after a single, unsuccessful run as a four-year-old.

== Background ==
Petrushka, a dark chestnut filly with a small white star was bred at the Airlie Stud, near Maynooth, County Kildare, sired by the Northern Dancer stallion Unfuwain out of the mare Ballet Shoes. Unfuwain was a high-class middle-distance runner who won four Group races before siring the winners of more than five hundred winners at stud. Ballet Shoes, who won two minor races, was a product of the Ballymacoll Stud and a half sister to the Champion Stakes winner Spectrum. As a descendant of the broodmare Sunny Valley, she was also closely related to Sun Princess.

Petrushka's name derives from the ballet by Stravinsky, and was suggested by the name of her dam. An odd feature of the filly's name was that the original Petrushka in Russian folk puppetry was male.

Petrushka was sent as a yearling to the Goffs sales in October 1998 where she was bought for IR£110,000 by John Warren, the director of the Highclere Thoroughbred Racing group. Petrushka was sent into training with Sir Michael Stoute at Newmarket, Suffolk.

== Racing career ==
=== 1999: two-year-old season ===
Petrushka had only one race as a two-year-old, starting 5/1 second favourite in a maiden race at Leicester in October. She started slowly and took time to reach her full speed, but then made rapid progress to take the lead inside the final furlong and win "cleverly" by three quarters of a length.

Despite the race's modest status, Petrushka's win attracted attention, and she went into the winter break regarded as "a serious filly" and a possible contender for the following year's Classics.

=== 2000: three-year-old season ===
==== Spring ====
Petrushka was originally considered more of a prospect for the one and a half mile Oaks, than the 1000 Guineas over one mile, but her improved home form suggested that she had the speed for the shorter classic. On her three-year-old debut, Petrushka confirmed this impression in her first Group race, the Nell Gwyn Stakes over seven furlongs at Newmarket. She was sent off the 7/2 favourite, despite the presence in the field of the Cheveley Park Stakes winner Seazun. Held up in the early stages by Kieren Fallon, Petrushka moved up to take the lead a furlong out and pulled clear to beat Seazun by four lengths. Fallon praised the filly saying that "she travels and she's got a serious turn of foot. You couldn't fault her in any way." Her odds for the Guineas and the Oaks were cut to 2/1 and 5/1 respectively. Tony Morris, writing in the Racing Post, offered the opinion that "a star was born" in the Nell Gwyn.

Less than three weeks later Petrushka was made 6/4 favourite against seventeen opponents in the 1000 Guineas. Petrushka was held up by Fallon, but was bumped when trying to make a forward move and was then unable to find space for a clear run. She finished strongly, but was unable to reach the leaders, finishing third, more than four lengths behind Lahan.

==== Summer ====
Petrushka was then moved up in distance for the Oaks over one and a half miles at Epsom for which she was made 9/2 third favourite. Her second attempt at classic success ended in failure, however, as she finished a well-beaten fourth behind Love Divine, Kalypso Katie and Melikah.

From this point on, Petrushka showed rapid improvement. In July she was sent to The Curragh for the Irish Oaks, where she was ridden for the first time by Johnny Murtagh, Fallon having suffered a serious shoulder injury at Royal Ascot. After tracking the leaders in the early stages, Petrushka took the lead in the straight and pulled well clear to win by five and a half lengths despite being eased down in the closing stages. She decisively reversed the Epsom for with Melikah, who finished second, and Kalypso Katie who was a further four and a half lengths back in fifth. The Independent described it as "a slaughter", while Stoute contrasted the performance with her previous two runs by insisting that "this is the real Petrushka."

The Yorkshire Oaks at York in August saw Petrushka matched against Love Divine for a second time, with the 1999 Champion Filly Ramruma also in the field. The meeting of the three outstanding fillies was highly anticipated as one of the "races of the season". Petrushka was held up as usual, as Ramruma made the early running. Murtagh made his challenge in the straight, as Love Divine moved past Ramruma to take the lead. Petrushka produced an impressive "burst of speed" to catch Love Divine a furlong out and stayed on well to beat the Oaks winner by one and a quarter lengths. After the race one of her owners suggested that both the Prix de l'Arc de Triomphe and the Champion Stakes were being considered for her next race, with the Breeders' Cup Filly & Mare Turf as her likely end of season target.

==== Autumn ====
In October, Petrushka was sent to France for the Prix de l'Opéra at Longchamp. Although the opposition in the Group One race did not appear to be as strong as at York, the distance of 2000m was short of Petrushka's best and an unfavourable draw did not help her chances. Murtagh predictably held the filly up before moving her to the wide outside to challenge in the straight. Petrushka produced a sustained run to take the lead inside the final 200m and win by three quarters of a length from the Prix Saint-Alary winner Reve d'Oscar.

On her final start of the season, Petrushka was sent to Churchill Downs for the Breeders' Cup and was made 7/5 favourite for the Filly & Mare Turf. She was settled in sixth place by Murtagh before being moved out to challenge in the straight. She could make no progress however, and finished fifth of the fourteen starters behind Perfect Sting.

=== 2001: four-year-old season ===
Petrushka was kept in training at four but had little chance to make an impact, despite positive reports concerning her form in training. On her only start she finished fifth of the six runners behind Mutafaweq in the Coronation Cup at Epsom in June.

Shortly after the race it was announced that she had sustained a tendon injury in her right foreleg and would be unable to race again. At the end of June she was sold to Sheikh Mohammed bin Rashid al-Maktoum's Darley Stud as a prospective broodmare for a reported £3,500,000.

== Assessment ==
At the Cartier Racing Awards for 2000, Petrushka was named European Champion Three-Year-Old Filly. In the official International Classification, Petrushka was rated the second best European filly on a rating of 122, four pounds below the Prix de l'Arc de Triomphe runner-up Egyptband.

Michael Stoute called Petrushka "the best middle-distance filly I have trained."

== Stud career ==
Although Petrushka has been bred to many leading stallions including Rainbow Quest and Gone West, she has yet to produce a top class flat runner. Her son Parlour Games (by Monsun) is however a Grade I National Hunt winner having triumphed in the 2014 Challow Novices' Hurdle.

== Pedigree ==
Pedigree of Petrushka (IRE), chestnut mare, 1997
| Sire Unfuwain (USA) 1985 | Northern Dancer; 1961 | Nearctic | Nearco |
| Sire Unfuwain (USA) 1985 | Northern Dancer; 1961 | Nearctic | Lady Angela |
| Sire Unfuwain (USA) 1985 | Northern Dancer; 1961 | Natalma | Native Dancer |
| Sire Unfuwain (USA) 1985 | Northern Dancer; 1961 | Natalma | Almahmoud |
| Sire Unfuwain (USA) 1985 | Height of Fashion; 1979 | Bustino | Busted |
| Sire Unfuwain (USA) 1985 | Height of Fashion; 1979 | Bustino | Ship Yard |
| Sire Unfuwain (USA) 1985 | Height of Fashion; 1979 | Highclere | Queens Hussar |
| Sire Unfuwain (USA) 1985 | Height of Fashion; 1979 | Highclere | Highlight |
| Dam Ballet Shoes (IRE) 1990 | Ela-Mana-Mou; 1976 | Pitcairn | Petingo |
| Dam Ballet Shoes (IRE) 1990 | Ela-Mana-Mou; 1976 | Pitcairn | Border Bounty |
| Dam Ballet Shoes (IRE) 1990 | Ela-Mana-Mou; 1976 | Rose Bertin | High Hat |
| Dam Ballet Shoes (IRE) 1990 | Ela-Mana-Mou; 1976 | Rose Bertin | Wide Awake |
| Dam Ballet Shoes (IRE) 1990 | River Dancer; 1983 | Irish River | Riverman |
| Dam Ballet Shoes (IRE) 1990 | River Dancer; 1983 | Irish River | Irish Star |
| Dam Ballet Shoes (IRE) 1990 | River Dancer; 1983 | Dancing Shadow | Dancer's Image |
| Dam Ballet Shoes (IRE) 1990 | River Dancer; 1983 | Dancing Shadow | Sunny Valley (Family: 1-l) |
