= Richard Hills (jockey) =

English jockey

Personal information
- Born: 22 January 1963 (age 63)
- Occupation: Jockey
- Height: 5 ft 4 in (163 cm)

Horse racing career
- Sport: Horse racing
- Career wins: 1,892

Major racing wins
- British Classic Races: 2000 Guineas Stakes (2004); St Leger Stakes (1999); 1000 Guineas Stakes (1995, 2000, 2009); Oaks Stakes (2005); Other major races: British Champions Sprint Stakes (1997, 2007, 2009); British Champions Fillies' and Mares' Stakes (2003); Queen Elizabeth II Stakes (1994, 2001); Dewhurst Stakes (1998); Champion Stakes (2001, 2004); Middle Park Stakes (1997, 2009); Grosser Preis von Berlin (2000); Preis der Diana (2002); Grosser Preis von Bayern (1995); Prix du Moulin de Longchamp (2009); Prix Morny (2009); Al Maktoum Challenge, Round 3 (1998); Dubai World Cup (1999); Dubai Turf (1999); Jebel Hatta (2005); Dubai Sheema Classic (2002); Falmouth Stakes (2000, 2002); International Stakes (2002); July Cup (1998); Coronation Stakes (2009); Gold Cup (1990)

Significant horses
- Almutawakel, Aqlaam, Arcano, Ashal, Awzaan, Elnadim, Eswarah, Ghanaati, Haafhd, Harayir, Hayil, Lahan, Maroof, Mujahid, Mutafaweq, Nayef, Salve Regina, Summoner, Wind in Her Hair
- Updated on 22 October 2023

Richard Hills (born 22 January 1963) is a retired flat racing jockey, who won six British Classic Races in a 33-year career.

== Career ==
Richard James Hills was born in Newmarket, Suffolk on 22 January 1963, along with twin brother Michael who also became a jockey. Their father is former racehorse trainer Barry Hills. The twins' older brother John Hills was also a trainer. They have two younger brothers.

Hills rode his first winner, Border Dawn, at Doncaster on 26 October 1979, a couple of months after Michael had ridden his first. Initially apprenticed to his father, he transferred to Tom Jones, for whom he had won the Yorkshire Cup on Ilium and finished fourth in the Derby on At Talaq.

His first Group 1 winner was Ashal in the Ascot Gold Cup in 1990. He became the second jockey of Hamdan Al Maktoum in 1995, and was promoted to first jockey in 1997 following the retirement of Willie Carson. He used to fill in on spare rides for Godolphin Racing. He retired at the Dubai World Cup on 31 March 2012. On Sky Sports TV coverage, he joked that he retired twice in one day, as the inaugural Dubai Gold Cup in which he was racing had to be re-run, due to a fall by a Godolphin horse, Fox Hunt.

== British career wins ==
- 1979 – 2
- 1980 – 6
- 1981 – 12
- 1982 – 31
- 1983 – 25
- 1984 – 39
- 1985 – 39
- 1986 – 42
- 1987 – 46
- 1988 – 52
- 1989 – 63
- 1990 – 56
- 1991 – 67
- 1992 – 52
- 1993 – 57
- 1994 – 59
- 1995 – 70
- 1996 – 71
- 1997 – 85
- 1998 – 83
- 1999 – 77
- 2000 – 81
- 2001 – 79
- 2002 – 82
- 2003 – 75
- 2004 – 66
- 2005 – 72
- 2006 – 54
- 2007 – 73
- 2008 – 68

== Major wins ==
(United Kingdom) Great Britain

- 1,000 Guineas – (3) – Harayir (1995), Lahan (2000), Ghanaati (2009)
- 2,000 Guineas – (1) – Haafhd (2004)
- Ascot Gold Cup – (1) – Ashal (1990)
- Champion Stakes – (2) – Nayef (2001), Haafhd (2004)
- Coronation Stakes – (1) – Ghanaati (2009)
- Dewhurst Stakes – (1) – Mujahid (1998)
- Falmouth Stakes – (2) – Alshakr (2000), Tashawak (2002)
- International Stakes – (1) – Nayef (2002)
- July Cup – (1) – Elnadim (1998)
- Middle Park Stakes – (2) – Hayil (1997), Awzaan (2009)
- Oaks – (1) – Eswarah (2005)
- Prince of Wales's Stakes – (2) – Mtoto (1987), Nayef (2003)
- Queen Elizabeth II Stakes – (2) – Maroof (1994), Summoner (2001)
- St Leger – (1) – Mutafaweq (1999)

Canada

- Canadian International Stakes – (1) – Mutamam (2001)

France

- Prix Morny – (1) – Arcano (2009)
- Prix du Moulin de Longchamp – (1) – Aqlaam (2009)

Germany

- Aral-Pokal – (1) – Wind in Her Hair (1995)
- Deutschland-Preis – (1) – Mutafaweq (2000)
- Preis der Diana – (1) – Salve Regina (2002)

Italy

- Gran Premio del Jockey Club – (1) – Ekraar (2003)
- Gran Premio di Milano – (1) – Leadership (2003)

United Arab Emirates

- Dubai Duty Free Stakes – (1) – Altibr (1999)
- Dubai Sheema Classic – (1) – Nayef (2002)
- Dubai World Cup – (1) – Almutawakel (1999)

== See also ==
- List of jockeys
- List of significant families in British horse racing

== Bibliography ==
- Wright, Howard (1986). The Encyclopaedia of Flat Racing. London: Robert Hale. ISBN 0-7090-2639-0.

Sporting positions
Preceded by Willie Carson	Hamdan Al Maktoum retained jockey 1997–2012	Succeeded by Paul Hanagan
