= Dick Hern =

English horse trainer (1921–2002)

Personal information
- Born: 20 January 1921 Holford, Somerset, England
- Died: 22 May 2002 (aged 81) Oxford, Oxfordshire, England
- Occupation: Horse trainer

Horse racing career
- Sport: Horse racing

Major racing wins
- British Classic Race wins: 2,000 Guineas (2); 1,000 Guineas (2); Epsom Oaks (3); Epsom Derby (3); St. Leger Stakes (6)

Honours
- Champion Trainer (1962, 1972, 1980, 1983); British Racing Hall of Fame (2025)

Significant horses
- Hethersett, Provoke, Highest Hopes, Brigadier Gerard, Sallust, Highclere, Bustino, Dunfermline, Troy, Ela-Mana-Mou, Henbit, Sun Princess, Petoski, Minster Son, Unfuwain, Nashwan, Alhaarth, Dayjur, Harayir.

William Richard Hern CVO CBE (20 January 1921 – 22 May 2002) was an English Thoroughbred racehorse trainer and winner of sixteen British Classic Races between 1962 and 1995, and was Champion Trainer on four occasions.

Following his early career in the Army (Major), he became a riding instructor, including a spell as instructor to the Olympic gold medal-winning team in 1952. His first training licence was as private trainer to Major Lionel Holliday in 1958, at La Grange Stables in Newmarket, before moving to West Ilsley at the end of the 1962 season to take over from R. J. "Jack" Colling.

Hern became a St. Leger Stakes specialist, winning the event six times. He produced three Epsom Derby winners in Troy (1979), Henbit (1980) and Nashwan (1989), who also won the 2,000 Guineas and the King George VI and Queen Elizabeth Stakes. Hern trained Brigadier Gerard who was only beaten once in eighteen races. Other major winners include Sun Princess, Dayjur, Hethersett, Bireme, Bustino, Longboat, Little Wolf, Petoski, Highclere, Provoke, Prince of Dance, Minster Son, Unfuwain, Dunfermline and Cut Above.

In December 1984, Hern was seriously injured in a hunting accident, after which time he used a wheelchair.

In 1988, he was controversially sacked from his position as trainer for Queen Elizabeth II at West Ilsley by her racing manager 7th Earl of Carnarvon – Hern was recovering from heart surgery at the time. Later a compromise was reached whereby Hern shared the stable with the new incumbent – William Hastings-Bass (later Earl of Huntingdon) for a year before moving to Hamdan Al Maktoum's Kingwood House Stables in Lambourn.

Dick Hern died on 22 May 2002 in Oxford, England, aged 81.

== Major wins ==
(United Kingdom) Great Britain

- 1,000 Guineas – (2) – Highclere (1974), Harayir (1995)
- 2,000 Guineas – (2) – Brigadier Gerard (1971), Nashwan (1989)
- Ascot Gold Cup – (2) – Little Wolf (1983), Longboat (1986)
- Champion Stakes – (2) – Brigadier Gerard (1971, 1972)
- Coronation Cup – (2) – Buoy (1974), Bustino (1975)
- Derby Stakes – (3) – Troy (1979), Henbit (1980), Nashwan (1989)
- Dewhurst Stakes – (1) – Alhaarth (1995)
- Eclipse Stakes – (4) – Brigadier Gerard (1972), Ela-Mana-Mou (1980), Nashwan (1989), Elmaamul (1990)
- Falmouth Stakes – (1) – Cistus (1978)
- Fillies' Mile – (1) – Height of Fashion (1981)
- Haydock Sprint Cup – (2) – Boldboy (1977), Dayjur (1990)
- Benson & Hedges Gold Cup – (2) – Relkino (1977), Troy (1979)
- July Cup – (1) – Galivanter (1961)
- King George VI & Queen Elizabeth Stakes – (5) – Brigadier Gerard (1972), Troy (1979), Ela-Mana-Mou (1980), Petoski (1985), Nashwan (1989)
- King's Stand Stakes – (1) – Dayjur (1990)
- Lockinge Stakes – (3) – Brigadier Gerard (1972), Boldboy (1974), Relkino (1977)
- Middle Park Stakes – (1) – Brigadier Gerard (1970)
- Nassau Stakes – (2) – Nortia (1962), Cistus (1978)
- Nunthorpe Stakes – (1) – Dayjur (1990)
- Epsom Oaks – (3) – Dunfermline (1977), Bireme (1980), Sun Princess (1983)
- Prince of Wales's Stakes – (3) – Brigadier Gerard (1972), Ela-Mana-Mou (1980), Morcon (1984)
- Queen Anne Stakes – (1) – Sun Prince (1973)
- Queen Elizabeth II Stakes – (3) – Brigadier Gerard (1971, 1972), Homing (1978)
- William Hill Futurity – (1) – Emmson (1987)
- St. James's Palace Stakes – (2) – Brigadier Gerard (1971), Sun Prince (1972)
- St. Leger – (6) – Hethersett (1962), Provoke (1965), Bustino (1974), Dunfermline (1977), Cut Above (1981), Sun Princess (1983)
- Sun Chariot Stakes – (1) – Dusty Dollar (1986)
- Sussex Stakes – (2) – Brigadier Gerard (1971), Sallust (1972)
- Yorkshire Oaks – (4) – None Nicer (1958), Shoot A Line (1980), Sun Princess (1983), Roseate Tern (1989)

France

- Prix de l'Abbaye de Longchamp – (1) – Dayjur (1990)
- Prix de Diane – (1) – Highclere (1974)
- Prix du Moulin de Longchamp – (1) – Sallust (1972)
- Prix de l'Opéra – (1) – Cistus (1978)
- Prix Royal Oak – (1) – Niniski (1979)
- Prix Vermeille – (1) – Highest Hopes (1970)

(Republic of Ireland) Ireland

- Irish 1,000 Guineas – (1) – Gaily (1974)
- Irish 2,000 Guineas – (1) – Sharp Edge (1973)
- Irish Champion Stakes – (1) – Elmaamul (1990)
- Irish Derby – (1) – Troy (1979)
- Irish Oaks – (3) – Shoot A Line (1980), Swiftfoot (1982), Helen Street (1985)
- Irish St. Leger – (2) – Craighouse (1965), Niniski (1979)
