= Height of Fashion (horse) =

French-bred, British-trained Thoroughbred racehorse

- Sire: Bustino
- Grandsire: Busted
- Dam: Highclere
- Damsire: Queen's Hussar
- Sex: Mare
- Foaled: 14 April 1979
- Country: United Kingdom
- Colour: Bay
- Breeder: Queen Elizabeth II
- Owner: Queen Elizabeth II; Hamdan Al Maktoum
- Trainer: Dick Hern
- Record: 7: 5-0-0

Major wins
- Acomb Stakes (1981); May Hill Stakes (1981); Fillies' Mile (1981); Lupe Stakes (1982); Princess of Wales's Stakes (1982)

Awards
- Top-rated British two-year-old filly (1981); Timeform rating 115 (1981), 124 (1982)

Height of Fashion (14 April 1979 – 29 July 2000) was a French-bred, British-trained Thoroughbred racehorse and broodmare. Owned and bred by Queen Elizabeth II, she was undefeated in her three races as a two-year-old in 1981, winning the Acomb Stakes, May Hill Stakes and Fillies' Mile. The following year she added a win in the Lupe Stakes before a record-breaking victory in the Princess of Wales's Stakes. She ran poorly in her two remaining races and was retired to stud at the end of the season. Height of Fashion proved to be an exceptional broodmare, producing the major stakes winners Unfuwain, Nashwan and Nayef. She died in Kentucky in 2000.

== Background ==
Height of Fashion was a "massive" bay mare bred by her owner Queen Elizabeth II. She was one of the best horses sired by Bustino, who won the 1974 St Leger Stakes and the 1975 Coronation Cup as well as finishing second to Grundy in a famous race for the King George VI and Queen Elizabeth Stakes. Her dam Highclere won the 1000 Guineas and the Prix de Diane for the Queen in 1974 and went on to become an influential broodmare. Apart from Height of Fashion and her descendants, she was also the ancestor of the Japanese champion Deep Impact.

The filly was sent into training with Dick Hern at West Ilsley in Berkshire.

== Racing career ==
=== 1981: two-year-old season ===
Height of Fashion began her racing career in the Acomb Stakes (now a Group Three race) at York Racecourse. Racing against colts, she won from Ashenden with Count Pahlen (later to win the William Hill Futurity) in third place and was ridden by Lester Piggott, replacing the injured Willie Carson. After the race, Hern described the winner as "a grand filly" who closely resembled her dam Highclere. She was then moved up to Group Three class for the May Hill Stakes at Doncaster and was ridden to victory by the veteran Joe Mercer at odds of 4/6. Mercer was again the jockey when Height of Fashion ran next in the Hoover Fillies' Mile at Ascot Racecourse. She started at odds of 15/8 and completed an undefeated first season by beating the Waterford Candelabra Stakes winner Stratospheric.

=== 1982: three-year-old season ===
Height of Fashion began her second season in the Lupe Stakes at Goodwood Racecourse in May. She was hampered when Devon Air fell directly in front of her and it was only after a "monumental struggle" that she prevailed by two lengths from her stable companion Round Tower. She was considered a contender for the Oaks Stakes but bypassed the race as it was felt that she would be unsuited to the course at Epsom.

The filly did not race again until July when she ran against colts and older horses in the Princess of Wales's Stakes at Newmarket Racecourse where she wore blinkers for the first time. She was made the 4/1 second favourite behind Ardross, an outstanding stayer who had won the last two runnings of the Ascot Gold Cup. Ridden by Willie Carson, Height of Fashion led from the start and produced a career-best performance to win by two lengths in course record time from Amyndas, with Ardross in third.

Following her win at Newmarket, Height of Fashion was sold for a reported £1.5 million to Hamdan Al Maktoum. Later in July, Height of Fashion ran in her first Group One race when she was the only filly to contest the thirty-second running of the King George VI and Queen Elizabeth Stakes at Ascot. She never recovered after banging her head on exiting the starting stalls and finished seventh of the nine runners behind Kalaglow. On her final appearance on 17 August she failed to recover her previous form as she finished last behind Awaasif in Yorkshire Oaks.

== Stud record ==
Height of Fashion was retired from racing to become a broodmare for Hamdan Al Maktoum's Shadwell Stud in Kentucky. Her offspring included:

- Alwasmi (USA), bay colt, foaled 1984, sired by Northern Dancer (CAN), won G3 John Porter Stakes Newbury
- Unfuwain (USA), bay colt, 1985, by Northern Dancer (CAN), won G2 Princess of Wales's Stakes, Newmarket; G3 John Porter Stakes, Newbury; G3 Chester Vase, Chester; G2 Jockey Club Stakes, Newmarket; 2nd G1 King George VI & Queen Elizabeth Stakes, Ascot;
- Nashwan (USA), chestnut colt, foaled 1 March 1986, by Blushing Groom (FR), won G1 2000 Guineas, Newmarket; G1 Epsom Derby, Epsom; G1 Eclipse Stakes, Sandown; G1 King George VI and Queen Elizabeth Stakes, Ascot;
- Mukddaam (USA), bay colt, foaled 20 March 1987, by Danzig (USA), won 3 races, including LR Fred Archer Stakes, Newmarket; 2nd G2 King Edward VII Stakes, Royal Ascot; G2 Princess of Wales's Stakes, Newmarket;
- Manwah (USA), chestnut filly, foaled 1 May 1988, by Lyphard (USA) - placed 4 times from 5 starts in England 1991
- Bashayer (USA), brown filly, foaled 30 January 1990, by Mr Prospector (USA), won 2 races and placed 6 times including 2nd LR Cheshire Oaks from 12 starts in England 1992-93.Fourth dam of full-brothers Hukum and Baaeed.
- Wijdan (USA), chestnut filly, foaled 4 April 1991, by Mr Prospector (USA), won 2 races and placed 3 times from 5 races in England 1993-94
- Deyajeer (USA), bay filly, 1992, by Dayjur (USA) - unraced
- Sarayir (USA), bay filly, foaled 7 April 1994, by Mr Prospector (USA), won 3 races including LR Oh So Sharp Stakes, Newmarket and placed twice from 8 starts in Britain 1996-7; dam of Ghanaati (USA), won G1 1000 Guineas Stakes, Newmarket; G1 Coronation Stakes, Royal Ascot
- Burhan (USA), brown colt, foaled 6 April 1995, by Riverman (USA) - unraced
- Nayef (USA), bay colt, foaled 1 May 1998, by Gulch (USA), won 9 races including G1 Champion Stakes, Newmarket; G1 International Stakes, York; G1 Dubai Sheema Classic, Nad Al Sheba; G1 Prince of Wales's Stakes, Royal Ascot; G3 Rose of Lancaster Stakes, Haydock; G3 Select Stakes, Goodwood; G3 Cumberland Lodge Stakes, Ascot; LR Autumn Stakes, Ascot; placed 7 times including 2nd G1 King George VI and Queen Elizabeth Stakes, Ascot; 2nd G1 Eclipse Stakes, Sandown, from 20 starts in England, Ireland and Dubai 2000-2003

Height of Fashion was in foal to A P Indy when she died at Shadwell's Kentucky base on 29 July 2000.

== Pedigree ==
Pedigree of Height of Fashion (FR), bay mare, 1979
Sire Bustino (GB) 1971	Busted (GB); 1963	Crepello	Donatello
Sire Bustino (GB) 1971	Busted (GB); 1963	Crepello	Crepuscule
Sire Bustino (GB) 1971	Busted (GB); 1963	Sans Le Sou	Vimy
Sire Bustino (GB) 1971	Busted (GB); 1963	Sans Le Sou	Martial Loan
Sire Bustino (GB) 1971	Ship Yard (GB); 1963	Doutelle	Prince Chevalier
Sire Bustino (GB) 1971	Ship Yard (GB); 1963	Doutelle	Above Board
Sire Bustino (GB) 1971	Ship Yard (GB); 1963	Paving Stone	Fairway
Sire Bustino (GB) 1971	Ship Yard (GB); 1963	Paving Stone	Rosetta
Dam Highclere (GB) 1971	Queen's Hussar (GB); 1960	March Past	Petition
Dam Highclere (GB) 1971	Queen's Hussar (GB); 1960	March Past	Marcelette
Dam Highclere (GB) 1971	Queen's Hussar (GB); 1960	Jojo	Vilmorin
Dam Highclere (GB) 1971	Queen's Hussar (GB); 1960	Jojo	Fairy Jane
Dam Highclere (GB) 1971	Highlight (GB); 1958	Borealis	Brumeux
Dam Highclere (GB) 1971	Highlight (GB); 1958	Borealis	Aurora
Dam Highclere (GB) 1971	Highlight (GB); 1958	Hypericum	Hyperion
Dam Highclere (GB) 1971	Highlight (GB); 1958	Hypericum	Feola (Family: 2-f)
