= Bustino =

British-bred Thoroughbred racehorse (1971–1997)

- Sire: Busted
- Grandsire: Crepello
- Dam: Ship Yard
- Damsire: Doutelle
- Sex: Stallion
- Foaled: 1971
- Country: Great Britain
- Colour: Bay
- Breeder: E. Cooper Bland
- Owner: Lady Beaverbrook
- Trainer: Dick Hern
- Record: 9: 5-3-1
- Earnings: US$335,030 (equivalent)

Major wins
- Sandown Classic Trial (1974); Lingfield Derby Trial (1974); Great Voltigeur Stakes (1974); St. Leger Stakes (1974); Coronation Cup (1975)

Awards
- British Champion Older Horse (1975); Leading broodmare sire in Britain & Ireland (1989); Timeform rating: 136
- Last updated on 11 March 2025

Bustino (14 April 1971 – 2 October 1997) was a British Thoroughbred racehorse and sire. In a career which lasted from August 1973 until July 1975, he ran nine times and won five races. He was the best British three-year-old of 1974, when his wins included the Classic St Leger, as well as the Sandown Classic Trial, Lingfield Derby Trial and Great Voltigeur Stakes. As a four-year-old he won the Coronation Cup in record time and finished second to Grundy in the King George VI and Queen Elizabeth Stakes in what is often described as the 'Race of the Century'. He was a successful stallion.

== Background ==
Bustino was a bay horse bred by Edgar Cooper Bland. He was sired by 1967 British Horse of the Year, Busted, out of the mare Ship Yard. As a descendant of the mare Rose Red, Bustino was related to the British Classic winners Larkspur, Alycidon and My Babu as well as the Belmont Stakes winner Celtic Ash.

As a yearling, he was sent to the sales at Newmarket where he was bought for 21,000 guineas by Lady Beaverbrook. Lady Beaverbrook was considered an eccentric character who gave most of her horses names consisting of one word with seven letters (Bustino, Terimon, Boldboy, Niniski, Mystiko, Petoski), as this was the most common form for Derby winners.

Bustino was sent into training with Dick Hern at West Ilsley in Berkshire.

== Racing career ==
=== 1973: two-year-old season ===
Like many of Hern's best horses, Bustino was not highly tried at two-year-old. He made his only appearance in the Acomb Stakes at York in August and finished third.

=== 1974: three-year-old season ===
As a three-year-old in 1974, the colt began by winning the Sandown Classic Trial from the future Epsom Derby winner Snow Knight, who was carrying five pounds more in weight. In the Lingfield Derby Trial he again defeated Snow Knight, this time at level weights.

At Epsom, he seemed to be unsuited by the firm ground and finished fourth in the Derby, behind Snow Knight, Imperial Prince and Giacometti. Bustino was then sent to France for the Grand Prix de Paris at Longchamp Racecourse, in which he finished second of the eighteen runners, beaten two lengths by Sagaro. Back in England, he won the Great Voltigeur Stakes in August, beating Irish Derby winner English Prince.

At Doncaster in September, Bustino started the 11/10 favourite for the St. Leger Stakes. He was assisted by his stable companion Riboson, who set a strong pace, before Bustino took the lead in the straight and won by three lengths from Giacometti.

=== 1975: four-year-old season ===
Sent back to the track in 1975 at age four, Bustino won the Group One Coronation Cup at Epsom Downs Racecourse then was an integral part of what the British racing world and major newspapers dubbed the "Race of the Century."

==== Britain's "Race of the Century" ====
Bustino was against a very solid field in the King George VI and Queen Elizabeth Stakes that was open to older horses. The participants included Eclipse Stakes winner, Star Appeal, Nelson Bunker Hunt's mare, Dahlia, one of the greatest female horses in world Thoroughbred racing history, and the three-year-old Grundy, a winner of both the Epsom and Irish Derbys.

Trainer Dick Hern knew Bustino had the stamina for the 2,414 metre race (1½ miles) and started two of Bustino's stablemates to set a blistering early pace designed to wear down Grundy. With half a mile left to run, Bustino and jockey Joe Mercer led the race. He was ahead by four lengths by the time they entered the top of the straight when Pat Eddery on Grundy mounted a charge. The two horses began pulling away from the rest of the field and with a furlong left to run, Grundy passed Bustino, who soon retook the lead. Fifty yards from the finish line, Grundy fought back and recaptured the lead, holding off Bustino's continued furious effort to win by half a length with Dahlia another five lengths behind in third. The winning time of 2:26.98 beat the race record by almost two and a half seconds, a record that lasted for 35 years. It happens,that a race of this nature took a toll on both horses. Grundy ran only once more without success, and Bustino never raced again.

In The Observer newspaper's list of the "10 greatest horse races of all time," the match between Bustino and Grundy in the King George VI and Queen Elizabeth Stakes at Ascot Racecourse on 26 July 1975, was ranked number two: number one was the race between Quashed and Omaha for the 1936 Ascot Gold Cup.

Bustino was being prepared for the Prix de l'Arc de Triomphe when he sustained an injury to his foreleg which ended his racing career. He was retired to stud with a valuation of £600,000.

== Assessment ==
Bustino was awarded a rating of 136 by Timeform. A rating of 130 is considered the mark of an above average Group One winner. In their book A Century of Champions, John Randall and Tony Morris rated Bustino the eighty-seventh best racehorse of the twentieth century and the thirty-eighth best British horse.

== Stud career ==
Retired to stud duty, Bustino proved a very successful sire. His offspring include:

- Easter Sun (b. 1977), won 1982 Group 1 Coronation Cup
- Height of Fashion (b. 1979), as a two-year-old won the Acomb Stakes, May Hill Stakes and Fillies' Mile and as a three-year-old the Lupe Stakes and Princess of Wales's Stakes, beating Ardross. She was also dam of the Group One winning colts Nashwan and Nayef, as well as the multiple Group winner and leading sire Unfuwain. She was also the grand dam of the One Thousand Guineas winner Ghanaati
- Stufida (b. 1981), won Group 1 Premio Lydia Tesio Grand Dam of Pivotal
- Rakaposhi King (b. 1982), multiple stakes winner
- Supreme Leader (b. 1982), a flagship National Hunt stallion for Coolmore Stud who, between 1987 and 2001, covered 3,416 mares(not including the non-Thoroughbred mares he covered)
- Paean (b. 1983), won the 1987 Group 1 Ascot Gold Cup
- Terimon (b. 1986), won the 1991 Group 1 Juddmonte International Stakes

Bustino was notably the damsire of a number of successful horses including Vintage Crop. In 1989, he was the Leading broodmare sire in Great Britain & Ireland.

== Pedigree ==
Pedigree of Bustino bay stallion 1971
Sire Busted (GB) 1963	Crepello (GB); 1954	Donatello	Bleheim
Sire Busted (GB) 1963	Crepello (GB); 1954	Donatello	Delleana
Sire Busted (GB) 1963	Crepello (GB); 1954	Crepuscule	Mieuxce
Sire Busted (GB) 1963	Crepello (GB); 1954	Crepuscule	Red Sunset
Sire Busted (GB) 1963	Sans le Sou (IRE); 1957	Vimy	Wild Risk
Sire Busted (GB) 1963	Sans le Sou (IRE); 1957	Vimy	Mimi
Sire Busted (GB) 1963	Sans le Sou (IRE); 1957	Martial Loan	Court Martial
Sire Busted (GB) 1963	Sans le Sou (IRE); 1957	Martial Loan	Loan
Dam Ship Yard (GB) 1963	Doutelle (GB); 1954	Prince Chevalier	Prince Rose
Dam Ship Yard (GB) 1963	Doutelle (GB); 1954	Prince Chevalier	Chevalerie
Dam Ship Yard (GB) 1963	Doutelle (GB); 1954	Above Board	Straight Deal
Dam Ship Yard (GB) 1963	Doutelle (GB); 1954	Above Board	Feola
Dam Ship Yard (GB) 1963	Paving Stone (GB); 1946	Fairway	Phalaris
Dam Ship Yard (GB) 1963	Paving Stone (GB); 1946	Fairway	Scapa Flow
Dam Ship Yard (GB) 1963	Paving Stone (GB); 1946	Rosetta	Kantar
Dam Ship Yard (GB) 1963	Paving Stone (GB); 1946	Rosetta	Rose Red (Family 1-w)
