= Queen's Hussar =

British-bred Thoroughbred racehorse

- Sire: March Past
- Grandsire: Petition
- Dam: Jojo
- Damsire: Vilmorin
- Sex: Stallion
- Foaled: 1960
- Country: United Kingdom
- Colour: Bay
- Breeder: G S Stephens
- Owner: Henry Herbert, 6th Earl of Carnarvon
- Trainer: Thomas Corbett
- Record: 21: 7-2-2

Major wins
- Washington Singer Stakes (1962); Lockinge Stakes (1963); Sussex Stakes (1963)

Awards
- Leading sire in Great Britain and Ireland (1972); Timeform rating: 124

Queen's Hussar (1960–1981) was a British Thoroughbred racehorse and sire. He won the Washington Singer Stakes as a two-year-old in 1962 before taking the Lockinge Stakes and the top-class Sussex Stakes in 1963. He was retired to stud where his record was initially disappointing. However, he went on to sire the classic winners Brigadier Gerard, the highest-rated British horse of the twentieth century, and Highclere.

== Background ==
Queen's Hussar was a bay horse with a small white star officially bred by G. S. Stephens at the Highclere Stud. He was sired by March Past, a sprinter whose biggest win came in the Wokingham Stakes in 1954. Apart from Queen's Hussar, the best of his progeny was Major Rose, a stayer who won the Chester Cup and the Cesarewitch Handicap as well as being placed in two runnings of the Champion Hurdle. Queen's Hussar's dam Jojo won one minor race before becoming a successful broodmare. She also produced the Nell Gwyn Stakes winner Hiding Place who was the dam of the Ascot Gold Cup winner Little Wolf and the grand-dam of Sheikh Albadou.

During his racing career, Queen's Hussar raced in the colours of Henry Herbert, 6th Earl of Carnarvon, the owner of the Highclere Stud. He was trained by Thomas "Atty" Corbett (1921–1976) at Yew Tree House at Compton in Berkshire.

== Racing career ==
Queen's Hussar raced nine times as a two-year-old in 1962. He won the Cannon Yard Plate at Windsor Racecourse, the Cuddington Stakes at Epsom, the Washington Singer Stakes at Newbury and a Rous Memorial Stakes at Newmarket.

In the spring of 1963, Queen's Hussar was tried over sprint distances and finished third in the Palace House Stakes over five furlong at Newmarket. In May he was moved up in distance and matched against older horses in the Lockinge Stakes over one mile at Newbury. Ridden by the Australian jockey Scobie Breasley he started at odds of "9/2" and won from Cyrus and Romulus. At Royal Ascot in June he contested the Jersey Stakes in which he finished third behind the fillies The Creditor and Brief Flight. Queen's Hussar then ran in the Sussex Stakes (then restricted to three and four-year-olds) over one mile at Goodwood Racecourse on 31 July. Ridden by the Australian Ron Hutchinson he was given little chance and started a 25/1 outsider in front of a crowd which included Queen Elizabeth II. Hutchinson held the horse up at the back of the field before producing a strong late run to win by a head from the Irish 2,000 Guineas winner Linacre with Nereus three lengths back in third. In August, Queen's Hussar finished second to the filly Dunce Cap in the Hungerford Stakes over seven furlongs at Newbury.

Queen's Hussar raced three times as a four-year-old in 1964, recording his only win in the Cavendish Stakes at Sandown Park Racecourse.

== Assessment ==
In the 1962 Free Handicap, a ranking of the best two-year-olds to race in Great Britain, Queen's Hussar was assigned a weight of 123 pounds, eight pounds below the top-rated Crocket.

The independent Timeform organisation gave Queen's Hussar a peak rating of 124.

== Stud record ==
Queen's Hussar was retired from racing to become breeding stallion. In the early part of his stud career, there was little demand for his services and he stood for several years at a fee of £250. This changed following the successes of his son Brigadier Gerard from 1970 to 1972. The colt won seventeen races and is still rated by Timeform as the second best racehorse trained in Britain since 1947. Thanks to the performances of Brigadier Gerard, Queen's Hussar was the Leading sire in Great Britain and Ireland in 1972. His stud fee increased to £2,000, and he went on to sire several other good winners:

- Highclere, won the 1000 Guineas and the Prix de Diane before becoming an influential broodmare.
- Marquis de Sade, won King Edward VII Stakes
- Shiny Tenth, won Palace House Stakes
- Church Parade, won Vintage Stakes

== Pedigree ==
Pedigree of Queen's Hussar (GB), bay stallion, 1960
Sire March Past (GB) 1950	Petition (GB); 1944	Fair Trial	Fairway
Sire March Past (GB) 1950	Petition (GB); 1944	Fair Trial	Lady Juror
Sire March Past (GB) 1950	Petition (GB); 1944	Art Paper	Artist's Proof
Sire March Past (GB) 1950	Petition (GB); 1944	Art Paper	Quire
Sire March Past (GB) 1950	Marcelette (GB); 1942	William of Valence	Vatout
Sire March Past (GB) 1950	Marcelette (GB); 1942	William of Valence	Queen Iseult
Sire March Past (GB) 1950	Marcelette (GB); 1942	Permavon	Stratford
Sire March Past (GB) 1950	Marcelette (GB); 1942	Permavon	Curl Paper
Dam Jojo (GB) 1950	Vilmorin (GB); 1943	Gold Bridge	Golden Boss
Dam Jojo (GB) 1950	Vilmorin (GB); 1943	Gold Bridge	Flying Diadem
Dam Jojo (GB) 1950	Vilmorin (GB); 1943	Queen of the Meadows	Fairway
Dam Jojo (GB) 1950	Vilmorin (GB); 1943	Queen of the Meadows	Queen of the Blues
Dam Jojo (GB) 1950	Fairy Jane (GB); 1939	Fair Trial	Fairway
Dam Jojo (GB) 1950	Fairy Jane (GB); 1939	Fair Trial	Lady Juror
Dam Jojo (GB) 1950	Fairy Jane (GB); 1939	Light Tackle	Salmon Trout
Dam Jojo (GB) 1950	Fairy Jane (GB); 1939	Light Tackle	True Joy (Family: 19-c)

- Queen's Hussar was inbred 3 x 3 to Fair Trial, meaning that this stallion appear twice in the third generation of his pedigree. He was also inbred 4 x 4 x 4 to Fairway.
