= Busted (horse) =

British-bred Thoroughbred racehorse (1963–1988)

- Sire: Crepello
- Grandsire: Donatello
- Dam: Sans le Sou
- Damsire: Vimy
- Sex: Stallion
- Foaled: 16 March 1963
- Country: United Kingdom
- Colour: Bay
- Breeder: Stanhope Joel
- Owner: Stanhope Joel
- Trainer: R. N. Fetherstonhaugh; Noel Murless
- Record: 13:5–2–1

Major wins
- Gallinule Stakes (1966); Coronation Stakes (1967); Eclipse Stakes (1967); King George VI & Queen Elizabeth Stakes (1967); Prix Foy (1967); Timeform rating: 134

Awards
- British Horse of the Year (1967)
- Last updated on 20 April 2023

Busted (16 March 1963 – 11 March 1988) was a British Thoroughbred racehorse and sire. He was trained at first in Ireland but was moved to England, where his form improved enormously. In 1967, he was undefeated in four races, winning the Eclipse Stakes and the King George VI & Queen Elizabeth Stakes and being voted horse of the year. After his racing career was ended by injury, he was retired to stud, where he proved to be a highly successful sire of winners.

== Background ==
Busted was a "big, handsome" bay horse bred by his owner, Stanhope Joel's Snailwell Stud. He was sired by the 1957 Epsom Derby winner Crepello out of the mare Sans le Sou. Joel bought Sans le Sou for 750 guineas after an undistinguished racing career which was hampered by a tendency to break blood-vessels. Joel sent the colt to be trained in Ireland by R.N. "Brud" Fetherstonhaugh.

== Racing career ==
=== 1965: two-year-old season ===
Busted was an immature two-year-old and showed little ability. He finished unplaced in both his races.

=== 1966: three-year-old season ===
As a three-year-old, Busted showed some improvement, but appeared to be well below top class. He won the Gallinule Stakes at the Curragh by a head from Pieces of Eight who was carrying ten pounds more than the winner (Pieces of Eight did go on to win that year's Eclipse Stakes). When tried at the highest level he finished unplaced behind the English-trained Sodium in the Irish Derby. Busted finished second to White Gloves in the Desmond Stakes and then ran unplaced in the Irish Cambridgeshire Handicap.

At the end of the year it seemed likely that Busted would be gelded and prepared for a career as a National Hunt horse. Stanhope Joel's cousin, Jim Joel however, needed a lead horse for his Classic contender Royal Palace, and Busted was selected for the role. He was sent to England where he joined the stable of Noel Murless. Murless told the story that he saw Busted's effort in the Irish Derby and considered him suitable to be Royal Palace's lead horse. However he felt the situation could be difficult if he bought the colt for Jim Joel and then improved him. At the end of the season Murless asked Stanhope Joel what he was doing with Busted. When Stanhope replied that he was having the horse gelded, Murless said "Christ, you'd better not do that".

=== 1967: four-year-old season ===
In England, Busted showed remarkable improvement, and soon demonstrated that he was far too good for his intended role of exercise companion. He instead came to be aimed at the major middle-distance events in which he was to be ridden by the Australian jockey George Moore. He did lead Royal Palace in his work up to his first start for Murless. At Sandown in April he won the Coronation Stakes over ten furlongs. He returned from this race with a slight injury which curtailed his lead work and it was decided to aim him at the King George VI & Queen Elizabeth Stakes. Because of this injury Busted did not return to the track until July when he went back to Sandown for the Eclipse Stakes over the same course and distance: to "tune him up" according to his trainer for his Ascot target. Stable jockey Moore rode Murless's, much more fancied Fleet, who had won the One Thousand Guineas and Busted was ridden by Bill Rickaby. Busted, who started at 8/1, produced a strong finish to take the lead fifty yards from the finish and won easily by two lengths from Great Nephew.

A week later he was aimed at Britain's most prestigious weight-for-age race, the King George VI & Queen Elizabeth Stakes at Ascot on 15 July. Starting at odds of 4/1 he was restrained in last place in the early stages before being produced by Moore in the straight. He passed the entire field and pulled away to win very comfortably by three lengths from Salvo and Ribocco.

Busted was then trained for the Prix de l'Arc de Triomphe. In September he won the Prix Foy over the Arc course and distance. Shortly afterwards he sustained an injury to the tendons in his leg during exercise which forced his retirement.

== Honours and assessment ==
In an official poll organised by the Racecourse Association, Busted received 18 of the 40 votes to be elected 1967 British Horse of the Year ahead of his stable companion Royal Palace. He was given a Timeform rating of 134 in 1967, the second highest of the year behind the two-year-old Petingo (135). In their book A Century of Champions, John Randall and Tony Morris rated Busted at #80 in their global list of the 20th Century's best horses. Randall has also described Busted as "arguably a great champion, the best Flat horse trained in Britain in the 1960s".

== Stud career ==
Busted began his stud career at his owner's Snailwell Stud at a fee of £1,500. He was a successful stallion, with the best of his progeny being the middle distance champions Bustino and Mtoto. He was represented in the United States by the multiple Grade I winner Erins Isle. Busted died at the age of twenty-five after suffering a heart attack on 11 March 1988 at the Snailwell Stud.

== Pedigree ==
Pedigree of Busted (GB), bay stallion, 1963
Sire Crepello (GB) 1954	Donatello; 1934	Blenheim	Blandford*
Sire Crepello (GB) 1954	Donatello; 1934	Blenheim	Malva
Sire Crepello (GB) 1954	Donatello; 1934	Delleana	Clarissimus
Sire Crepello (GB) 1954	Donatello; 1934	Delleana	Duccia di Buoninsegna
Sire Crepello (GB) 1954	Crepuscule; 1948	Mieuxce	Massine
Sire Crepello (GB) 1954	Crepuscule; 1948	Mieuxce	L'Olivete
Sire Crepello (GB) 1954	Crepuscule; 1948	Red Sunset	Solario
Sire Crepello (GB) 1954	Crepuscule; 1948	Red Sunset	Dulce
Dam Sans le Sou (GB) 1957	Vimy; 1952	Wild Risk	Rialto
Dam Sans le Sou (GB) 1957	Vimy; 1952	Wild Risk	Wild Violet*
Dam Sans le Sou (GB) 1957	Vimy; 1952	Mimi	Black Devil
Dam Sans le Sou (GB) 1957	Vimy; 1952	Mimi	Mignon
Dam Sans le Sou (GB) 1957	Martial Loan; 1950	Court Martial	Fair Trial
Dam Sans le Sou (GB) 1957	Martial Loan; 1950	Court Martial	Instantaneous
Dam Sans le Sou (GB) 1957	Martial Loan; 1950	Loan	Portlaw
Dam Sans le Sou (GB) 1957	Martial Loan; 1950	Loan	Borrow (Family:2-s)

* Busted is inbred 4S x 5D to the stallion Blandford, meaning that he appears fourth generation on the sire side of his pedigree, and fifth generation (via Wild Violet) on the dam side of his pedigree.
