= Assessor (horse) =

Irish-bred Thoroughbred racehorse

- Sire: Niniski
- Grandsire: Nijinsky
- Dam: Dingle Bay
- Damsire: Petingo
- Sex: Stallion
- Foaled: 1 March 1989
- Died: 2012 (aged 22–23)
- Country: Ireland
- Colour: Bay
- Breeder: Airlie Stud
- Owner: Bjorn Nielsen; Sultan Al Kabeer
- Trainer: Richard Hannon Sr.
- Record: 32: 8-9-6
- Earnings: £432,364

Major wins
- Lingfield Derby Trial (1992); Prix Royal-Oak (1992); Yorkshire Cup (1993); Doncaster Cup (1993); Prix du Cadran (1993); St Leger Italiano (1995)

Assessor (1 March 1989 – 2012) was an Irish-bred, British-trained Thoroughbred racehorse and sire best known for his performances over extended distances. After winning two minor races as a juvenile developed into a high-class stayer in 1992, recording wins in the Lingfield Derby Trial and Prix Royal-Oak. He reached his peak as a four-year-old in 1993 when he won the Yorkshire Cup, Doncaster Cup and Prix du Cadran. He suffered from training problems thereafter but recorded another big win when he took the St Leger Italiano in 1995. After his retirement from racing he became a successful sire of National Hunt horses.

== Background ==
Assessor was a bay horse bred in Ireland by the County Kildare-based Airlie Stud. The colt was acquired by Bjorn Nielsen and entered training with Richard Hannon at East Everleigh in Wiltshire.

He was sired by the American-bred stallion Niniski, who won the Irish St. Leger and the Prix Royal-Oak in 1979 before going on to sire many good staying horses including Petoski, Minster Son and Hernando. Assessor's dam Dingle Bay was an unraced, Irish-bred daughter of Petingo. She was a granddaughter of B Flat (foaled 1958) whose other descendants included Bachir, Pitcairn and Rafha.

== Racing career ==
=== 1991: two-year-old season ===
Assessor began his racecourse career in a maiden race over seven furlongs on good to soft ground at Kempton Park on 7 August in which he was ridden by the apprentice jockey Richard Perham and won by three and a half lengths from Flight Lieutenant. He was ridden his four subsequent races that year by John Reid. Before the end of the month the colt had been moved up in class to finish second to Rodrigo de Triano in the Washington Singer Stakes and then run second to Twist and Turn in a Graduation Stakes at Sandown Park. In the Mornington Stakes at Ascot Racecourse on 27 September Assessor recorded his second victory as he came home four lengths clear of Bobzao (later to win the Hardwicke Stakes). The colt ended his season in the Group 1 Racing Post Trophy over one mile at Doncaster Racecourse in which he ran third behind Seattle Rhyme and Mack The Knife.

=== 1992: three-year-old season ===
Walter Swinburn rode Assessor in his first three runs as a three-year-old. On his seasonal debut he contested the Thresher Classic Trial over ten furlongs at Sandown in which he finished third behind Pollen Count and Aljadeer. The Maxims Club Derby Trial Stakes over one and a half miles at Lingfield Park on 9 May saw the colt start the 9/4 favourite against six opponents. After being pushed along in the early stages he went to the front three furlongs out and drew well clear to win "comfortably" by seven lengths from Tapis Rouge, with two and a half lengths back to Bonny Scot in third place. Assessor's win at Lingfield established him as a contender for the 1992 Epsom Derby and on 2 June he started the 9/1 joint third favourite in an eighteen-runner field for the 213th running of the race. He was never in contention and ran poorly, coming home thirteenth in a race which saw Dr Devious win from St Jovite.

After a break of two and a half months Assessor was ridden by Reid when he finished third to Bonny Scot in the Great Voltigeur Stakes at York and then ran sixth behind the filly User Friendly in the St Leger at Doncaster. On 3 October the colt was sent to France to contest the Group 3 Prix de Lutèce over 3000 metres at Longchamp Racecourse in which he was partnered by Richard Quinn and finished third behind Dadarissime and Jamshid, having led the race until the last 200 metres. Three week later he returned to Longchamp for the Group 1 Prix Royal-Oak over 3100 metres on soft ground, a race which saw him matched against older horses for the first time. He was re-opposed by Dadarissime and Jamshid while his other eight opponents included Sought Out (Prix du Cadran), Ivyanna (Oaks d'Italia), Justice (Prix Hubert de Chaudenay), Dariyoun (Gran Premio de Madrid), Always Friendly (Princess Royal Stakes) and Witness Box (Northumberland Plate). After being retrained by Quinn in the early stages he began to make steady progress and turned into the straight in second place behind Always Friendly. Assessor overtook the filly 300 metres from the finish and won by two and a half lengths with six lengths back to Sought Out in third.

=== 1993: four-year-old season ===
Assessor began his third season in April 1993 when he finished fourth to Linpac West in the John Porter Stakes Newbury and second to Roll A Dollar when favourite for the Sagaro Stakes at Ascot. On 13 May at York the colt was ridden by Quinn in the Yorkshire Cup over fourteen furlongs and started at odds of 9/1 in an eight-runner field. The Premio Roma winner Spring started favourite while the other runners included Mashaallah, Sapience (Princess of Wales's Stakes), Roll A Dollar and Shambo (Geoffrey Freer Stakes). Assessor raced close to the leaders from the start, took the lead approaching the final furlong and won by a length from Allegan.

After running third in the Henry II Stakes at Sandown, Assessor contested the Gold Cup over two and a half miles at Ascot in June. He took the lead in the straight but was overtaken and beaten into second by the seven-year-old Drum Taps, with Turgeon, Sought Out, Arcadian Heights, Vintage Crop and Further Flight finishing behind. He finished runner-up on his next two starts, beaten by Sonus in the Goodwood Cup and Azzilfi in the Geoffrey Freer Stakes. In the Doncaster Cup over two and a quarter miles on soft ground at Doncaster on 9 September the colt carried top weight of 133 pound and started the 5/4 favourite ahead of Further Flight and Witness Box. Quinn retrained Assessor at the rear of the five-runner field before sending him into the lead in the straight and drawing away to win by four lengths.

Nine days after his win at Doncaster Assessor contested the Irish St. Leger at the Curragh Racecourse and ran second to Vintage Crop, with Sonus, Drum Taps and Snurge in fourth, fifth and sixth. On 2 October the colt was sent to France for the Prix du Cadran over 4000 metres on heavy ground at Longchamp and started the 6/5 favourite ahead of ten opponents including Sonus, Turgeon, Oh So Risky (Triumph Hurdle, Prix Gladiateur), Dajraan (Prix Chaudenay) and Sought Out. Ridden by Reid, Assessor turned into the straight in fourth place, went to the front 300 metres from the finish, and pulled clear to win "easily" by six lengths. On his last run of the year Assessor attempted to repeat his 1992 success in the Prix Royal Oak but finished fifth to Raintrap after being badly hampered approaching the straight.

Shortly before his final appearance of the season Assessor had been acquired by the Saudi Sultan bin Mohammed bin Saud Al Kabeer.

=== Later career ===
Assessor was off the track for almost two years before returning for the Jockey Club Cup at Newmarket Racecourse in September 1995 and finishing second to Further Flight. After coming home fifth to Sunshack in the Prix Royal Oak he was sent to Italy for the St Leger Italiano over 2900 metres at Turin of 1 November. With Richard Hughes in the saddle he took the lead in the straight and won "easily" by almost three lengths from Puerto Escondido.

Assessor remained in training as a seven-year-old in 1996 but failed to win in six starts. He finished second to Further Flight in a race at Nottingham, fourth to Double Eclipse in the Prix Vicomtesse Vigier and second to Double Trigger in the Henry II Stakes. Despite his promising early form he finished last in his three subsequent races, namely the Ascot Gold Cup, Prix Kegorlay and Doncaster Cup.

== Stud record ==
After his retirement from racing, Assessor was sent to France and became successful sire of steeplechase horses. His offspring included My Way de Solzen, Reve de Sivola (Long Walk Hurdle), Anibale Fly (3rd in the Cheltenham Gold Cup) and Coo Star Sivola (Ultima Handicap Chase). He died in 2012 at the age of 23.

== Pedigree ==
Pedigree of Assessor (IRE), bay stallion, 1989
Sire Niniski (USA) 1976	Nijinsky (CAN); 1967	Northern Dancer	Nearctic
Sire Niniski (USA) 1976	Nijinsky (CAN); 1967	Northern Dancer	Natalma (USA)
Sire Niniski (USA) 1976	Nijinsky (CAN); 1967	Flaming Page	Bull Page (USA)
Sire Niniski (USA) 1976	Nijinsky (CAN); 1967	Flaming Page	Flaring Top (USA)
Sire Niniski (USA) 1976	Virginia Hills (USA); 1971	Tom Rolfe	Ribot (GB)
Sire Niniski (USA) 1976	Virginia Hills (USA); 1971	Tom Rolfe	Pocahontas
Sire Niniski (USA) 1976	Virginia Hills (USA); 1971	Ridin' Easy	Ridan
Sire Niniski (USA) 1976	Virginia Hills (USA); 1971	Ridin' Easy	Easy Eight
Dam Dingle Bay (IRE) 1976	Petingo (GB); 1965	Petition	Fair Trial
Dam Dingle Bay (IRE) 1976	Petingo (GB); 1965	Petition	Art Paper
Dam Dingle Bay (IRE) 1976	Petingo (GB); 1965	Alcazar (FR)	Alycidon (GB)
Dam Dingle Bay (IRE) 1976	Petingo (GB); 1965	Alcazar (FR)	Quarterdeck (GB)
Dam Dingle Bay (IRE) 1976	Border Bounty (GB); 1965	Bounteous	Rockefella
Dam Dingle Bay (IRE) 1976	Border Bounty (GB); 1965	Bounteous	Marie Elizabeth
Dam Dingle Bay (IRE) 1976	Border Bounty (GB); 1965	B Flat	Chanteur (FR)
Dam Dingle Bay (IRE) 1976	Border Bounty (GB); 1965	B Flat	Ardeen (Family: 7-a)
