= Pitcairn (horse) =

Irish Thoroughbred racehorse

- Sire: Petingo
- Grandsire: Petition
- Dam: Border Bounty
- Damsire: Bounteous
- Sex: Stallion
- Foaled: 1971
- Country: Ireland
- Colour: Bay
- Breeder: Captain Tim Rogers
- Owner: Sandy Struthers
- Trainer: John Dunlop
- Record: 15: 5-4-3
- Earnings: US$101,090 (equivalent)

Major wins
- Blue Riband Trial Stakes (1974); Hungerford Stakes (1974); Goodwood Mile (1974)

Awards
- Leading sire in Great Britain and Ireland (1980)

Pitcairn (1971–2004) was an Irish-bred Thoroughbred racehorse who competed in four countries before retiring to stud where he became Champion Sire in Britain.

== Background and pedigree ==
Bred at Airlie Stud in Ireland, Pitcairn was bought as a yearling at Ballsbridge for IR£3,200 by the British Bloodstock Agency for Sandy Struthers. The relatively modest price was possibly due to an unattractive skin condition. He was sired by Petingo (incidentally the leading Great British sire the season prior to his son winning the title) who also produced 1978 Oaks winner Fair Salinia and 1979 horse of the year Troy. Pitcairn's full brother, Valley Forge, finished third in the 1978 Irish St Leger as well as winning the Blandford Stakes of the same year while their full sister, Dingle Bay, produced classy stayer and successful National Hunt stallion Assessor. Half sister Eljazzi produced another Blandford Stakes winner in Chiang Mai who herself produced Chinese White, the Champion older Irish mare of 2010. She is also the grand dam of prominent sires Invincible Spirit and Kodiac. Their dam, Border Bounty finished second in 1968's Musidora Stakes, Park Hill Stakes and Yorkshire Oaks while her half sister, Brief Chorus, who finished third in the 1966 renewal of the latter named race, was also the great grand-dam of Bachir who won the Irish, French and UAE equivalents of the 2000 guineas.

== Racing career ==
=== 2yo season ===
Pitcairn made a winning debut on 9 May 1973 in the five furlong Warminster Stakes at Salisbury which he took by four lengths. He followed up with a victory over six furlongs in Kempton's Nightingale Stakes beating two previous winners. Pitcairn would not win any of his remaining five races for the season but he did run with credit in his final three starts. After finishing third to the talented Giacometti in Doncaster's Champagne Stakes, he was a two and a half length runner up to the season's leading juvenile, Habat, in Newmarket's Middle Park Stakes while wearing a hood for the first time. Pitcairn then returned to Newmarket to finish runner up to Cellini in the Dewhurst Stakes. He would surpass his latter two conquerors during the following season.

=== 3yo season ===
Pitcairn began his 1974 season with an eight length victory from Deerslayer in Epsom's Blue Riband Trial Stakes. This was followed by a solid effort on his return to Ireland in the Irish 2000 Guineas where after making the running, he was caught in the final strides by Furry Glen and beaten a short head. A fever of 104 ruled him out of the Epsom Derby, a race for which he was as low as 16/1. Pitcairn returned to action in the Sussex Stakes at Goodwood. Prior to the race, trainer John Dunlop was not convinced that his charge would be at his best. During the race, he was slow to break and unable to adopt his usual front running tactics so in light of his lack of fitness, the sixth-place finish was not without merit. He returned to winning ways next time out when taking the Hungerford Stakes at Newbury by three lengths from the useful Midsummer Star. Eight days later, Pitcairn added a third and final victory to his seasonal tally when beating his two rivals in the Goodwood Mile despite hanging left. Following a short break, Pitcairn finished a respectable third behind Giacometti and Northern Gem on his sole attempt over ten furlongs in Newmarket's Champion Stakes. His season closed with a rather tepid fifth in the Prix de la Forêt at Longchamp before finishing second behind the two-year-old and subsequent Italian Oaks winner Carnauba in the Premio Chiusura.

== Stud career ==
Upon retirement, Pitcairn stood at Lord Harrington's Greenmount Stud in Limerick at £1,250 no foal, no fee. However, he was not especially popular among broodmare nominations was exported to Japan in 1978. Nevertheless, he was crowned Champion Sire of Great Britain and Ireland in 1980 thanks largely to the efforts of Ela-Mana-Mou and Cairn Rouge.

=== Notable progeny ===
c = colt, f = filly, g = gelding

Foaled	Name	Sex	Notable Performances
1976	Ela-Mana-Mou	c	1978 1st Royal Lodge Stakes, 1979 1st King Edward VII Stakes, 3rd King George VI and Queen Elizabeth Stakes, 1980 Earl of Sefton Stakes, 1st Prince of Wales Stakes, 1st Eclipse Stakes, 1st King George VI and Queen Elizabeth Stakes, 3rd Prix de l'Arc de Triomphe
1976	Yanuka	f	1979 3rd 1000 Guineas Stakes, 3rd Coronation Stakes
1976	Bonnie Isle	f	1979 2nd Epsom Oaks, 2nd Sun Chariot Stakes, 1980 3rd Prince of Wales Stakes, 2nd Nassau Stakes
1977	Cairn Rouge	f	1980 1st Irish 1000 Guineas, 1st Coronation Stakes, 2nd Benson & Hedges Gold Cup, 1st Champion Stakes 1981 2nd Champion Stakes
1977	Kahaila	f	1980 3rd Yorkshire Oaks
1978	Flightling	f	1981 1st Princess Royal Stakes

== Pedigree ==
Pedigree of Pitcairn (IRE), Bay Horse, 1974
Sire Petingo (GB) Bay 1965	Petition; 1944	Fair Trial; 1932	Fairway
Sire Petingo (GB) Bay 1965	Petition; 1944	Fair Trial; 1932	Lady Juror
Sire Petingo (GB) Bay 1965	Petition; 1944	Art Paper; 1933	Artists Proof
Sire Petingo (GB) Bay 1965	Petition; 1944	Art Paper; 1933	Quire
Sire Petingo (GB) Bay 1965	Alcazar; 1957	Alycidon; 1945	Donatello
Sire Petingo (GB) Bay 1965	Alcazar; 1957	Alycidon; 1945	Aurora
Sire Petingo (GB) Bay 1965	Alcazar; 1957	Quarterdeck; 1947	Nearco
Sire Petingo (GB) Bay 1965	Alcazar; 1957	Quarterdeck; 1947	Poker Chip
Dam Border Bounty (IRE) Bay 1965	Bounteous; 1958	Rockefella; 1941	Hyperion
Dam Border Bounty (IRE) Bay 1965	Bounteous; 1958	Rockefella; 1941	Rockfel
Dam Border Bounty (IRE) Bay 1965	Bounteous; 1958	Marie Elizabeth; 1948	Mazarin
Dam Border Bounty (IRE) Bay 1965	Bounteous; 1958	Marie Elizabeth; 1948	Miss Honor
Dam Border Bounty (IRE) Bay 1965	B Flat; 1958	Chanteur; 1942	Chateau Bouscaut
Dam Border Bounty (IRE) Bay 1965	B Flat; 1958	Chanteur; 1942	La Diva
Dam Border Bounty (IRE) Bay 1965	B Flat; 1958	Ardeen; 1949	Ardan
Dam Border Bounty (IRE) Bay 1965	B Flat; 1958	Ardeen; 1949	Peradventure
