= Prince's Polly =

Irish-bred Thoroughbred racehorse

- Sire: English Prince
- Grandsire: Petingo
- Dam: Suspicious Polly
- Damsire: Above Suspicion
- Sex: Mare
- Foaled: 3 April 1979
- Country: Ireland
- Colour: Bay
- Breeder: Tom Nicholson
- Owner: Tom Nicholson; Kerry Fitzpatrick
- Trainer: Tom Nicholson; Dermot Weld
- Record: 10: 4–3-2

Major wins
- Silken Glider Stakes (1981); Irish 1,000 Guineas (1982); Pretty Polly Stakes (1982)

Awards
- Timeform rating 103 (1981), 113 (1982)

Prince's Polly (3 April 1979 – early 1983) was an Irish thoroughbred racehorse. As a two-year-old she won two races including the Silken Glider Stakes and was placed in her other three starts. In the following year she was the best Irish-trained filly of the season, defeating Woodstream and On The House in the Irish 1,000 Guineas before going on to win the Pretty Polly Stakes and finish second in the Irish Oaks. She was retired soon after but had no chance to make an impact as a broodmare as she died in 1983 at the age of four.

== Background ==
Prince's Polly was a "lengthy, deep-girthed" bay filly with a broad white blaze bred in Ireland by Tom Nicholson, a farmer from County Kilkenny. Nicholson, who also owned and trained her during her two-year-old season, had been successful in National Hunt racing and had trained Bigaroon to win three runnings of the Irish Cesarewitch. Her dam Suspicious Polly was also owned and trained by Nicholson and had some success on the track, winning three minor races in Ireland.

Her sire English Prince won the Irish Derby in 1974 and stood as breeding stallion in Europe before being exported to Japan in 1980. The best of his other progeny was Sun Princess who won The Oaks and St Leger in 1983.

== Racing career ==
=== 1981: two-year-old season ===
Prince's Polly began her racing career with a win in a maiden race over seven furlongs at Leopardstown Racecourse in June. Over the same course and distance in August she finished second twice, beaten three quarters of a length by Fly Street in the Ardenode Stud Stakes, and a neck by Woodstream in a minor event. She was then moved up in class and distance for the Group Three Silken Glider Stakes over one mile at Leopardstown in September. Ridden by the veteran Wally Swinburn she took the lead early in the straight and won by two and a half lengths from Realms Reason, to whom she was conceding six pounds. On her final appearance of the season she finished third in the Park Stakes over seven furlongs at the Curragh in October, conceding twelve pounds to the winner More Heather.

At the end of the year, a half-share in the filly was sold to the American owner Kerry Fitzpatrick and she was transferred to the stable of Dermot Weld.

=== 1982: three-year-old season ===
On her three-year-old debut Prince's Polly looked unlucky to be beaten when finishing third in the Azalea Stakes over seven furlongs at Leopardstown. She was then stepped up to the highest class when she was one of twenty-four fillies to contest the Irish 1000 Guineas over one mile at the Curragh on 22 May. The English 1000 Guineas winner On The House started the 3/1 favourite ahead of Woodstream, Mary Mitsu and Miss Lillian with Prince's Polly, ridden by Swinburn, going off the 12/1 fifth choice in the betting. Fly Start and More Heather were also in the field. The last quarter mile saw a prolonged struggle between Prince's Polly and On The House before the Irish filly pulled ahead in the closing stages to win by a length, with Woodstream finishing strongly to deprive On The House of second by a short head.

Prince's Polly bypassed The Oaks and ran instead in the Pretty Polly Stakes over ten furlongs at the Curragh in late June. With Swinburn again in the saddle she took the lead three furlongs out and won by three quarters of a length from Kazanina, to whom she was conceding four pounds. At the same track on 17 July she started favourite for the Irish Oaks over one and a half miles at the Curragh but was unable to catch the front-running Swiftfoot and was beaten three lengths into second place. In August she was made odds on favourite for the Brownstown Stakes at the Curragh but after briefly taking the lead she faded and finished sixth behind the Vincent O'Brien-trained Miraflora.

Prince's Polly was retired from racing to become a broodmare. She was sent to be covered in the United States but died there in early 1983.

== Assessment ==
In the Irish Free Handicap for 1981, Prince's Polly was given a weight of 120 pounds, making her the second-best juvenile filly trained in Ireland, 8 pounds inferior to the top-rated Woodstream. The independent Timeform organisation gave her a rating of 103, 10 pounds behind Woodstream and 19 behind their top two-year-old filly Circus Ring. In their annual Racehorses of 1981 they described her as "game and consistent" and likely to be suited by longer distances.

In 1982 she was given a rating of 113 by Timeform, 18 pounds behind their top-rated three-year-old fillies Akiyda and Time Charter. In the Irish Free Handicap she was rated the second best filly of her generation behind the British-trained Swiftfoot.

== Pedigree ==
Pedigree of Prince's Polly (IRE), bay mare, 1979
Sire English Prince (IRE) 1971	Petingo (GB); 1965	Petition	Fair Trial
Sire English Prince (IRE) 1971	Petingo (GB); 1965	Petition	Art Paper
Sire English Prince (IRE) 1971	Petingo (GB); 1965	Alcazar	Alycidon
Sire English Prince (IRE) 1971	Petingo (GB); 1965	Alcazar	Quarterdeck
Sire English Prince (IRE) 1971	English Miss (GB); 1955	Bois Roussel	Vatout
Sire English Prince (IRE) 1971	English Miss (GB); 1955	Bois Roussel	Plucky Liege
Sire English Prince (IRE) 1971	English Miss (GB); 1955	Virelle	Casterari
Sire English Prince (IRE) 1971	English Miss (GB); 1955	Virelle	Perfume
Dam Suspicious Polly (IRE) 1970	Above Suspicion (GB); 1956	Court Martial	Fair Trial
Dam Suspicious Polly (IRE) 1970	Above Suspicion (GB); 1956	Court Martial	Instantaneous
Dam Suspicious Polly (IRE) 1970	Above Suspicion (GB); 1956	Above Board	Straight Deal
Dam Suspicious Polly (IRE) 1970	Above Suspicion (GB); 1956	Above Board	Feola
Dam Suspicious Polly (IRE) 1970	Polly Flinders (IRE); 1962	Polly's Jet	Polynesian
Dam Suspicious Polly (IRE) 1970	Polly Flinders (IRE); 1962	Polly's Jet	Mary's Dell
Dam Suspicious Polly (IRE) 1970	Polly Flinders (IRE); 1962	Dedica (ITY)	Sirte
Dam Suspicious Polly (IRE) 1970	Polly Flinders (IRE); 1962	Dedica (ITY)	Debra (Family:17-b)
