= English Prince =

Irish-bred Thoroughbred racehorse

- Sire: Petingo
- Grandsire: Petition
- Dam: English Miss
- Damsire: Bois Roussel
- Sex: Stallion
- Foaled: 1971
- Country: Ireland
- Colour: Bay
- Breeder: Vera Hue-Williams
- Owner: Vera Hue-Williams
- Trainer: Peter Walwyn
- Record: 6: 4-2-0

Major wins
- White Rose Stakes (1974); Predominate Stakes (1974); King Edward VII Stakes (1974); Irish Derby (1974)

Awards
- Timeform rating 129 (1974)

English Prince (1971–1983) was an Irish-bred, British-trained Thoroughbred racehorse and sire. In a racing career which lasted four months in the spring and summer of 1974 he ran six times and won four races. After being beaten on his racecourse debut he won the White Rose Stakes, Predominate Stakes and King Edward VII Stakes in England before recording his most important success in the Irish Derby. He suffered from a series of training problems thereafter, was beaten by Bustino in his only subsequent race and was retired from racing at the end of the year. He sired the dual classic winner Sun Princess before being exported to Japan where he died in 1983.

== Background ==
English Prince was a "big, well-made, attractive" bay horse with a narrow white blaze and a white sock on his left hind leg bred by his owner, Vera Hue-Williams (formerly Vera Lilley) at her Irish stud in County Kildare which she ran in partnership with her second husband Roger Hue-Williams. She had previously owned many top-class racehorses including Supreme Court when married to Tom Lilley. In the same year, the Hue-Williams stud bred a colt by Sir Ivor who was named Imperial Prince and raced in Roger's ownership. English Prince was from the second crop of foals sired by Petingo, the leading English two-year-old of 1967 when he was rated the best horse in Europe by the independent Timeform organisation. Petingo's later progeny included the 1978 Oaks winner Fair Salinia and 1979 Derby winner Troy. English Prince's dam English Miss was a useful stayer (rated 99 by Timeform) who won over a mile as a two-year-old and ran in the Cesarewitch at three. English Miss's grand-dam Perfume was a half-sister to Ambiorix and the dam of the 2000 Guineas winner My Babu and the Prix Jacques Le Marois winner Sayani.

Vera Hue-Williams sent her colt into training with Peter Walwyn at the Seven Barrows Stable near Lambourn in Berkshire.

== Racing career ==
=== 1974: three-year-old season ===
Unraced as a two-year-old, English Prince made his racecourse debut in a maiden race over one mile at Newbury Racecourse in April and finished second to Final Chord who went on to win the Britannia Stakes in June. Despite his defeat English Prince was then moved up in class and distance for the Group Three White Rose Stakes over ten furlongs at Ascot Racecourse in May. Ridden by Pat Eddery, he won from Regular Guy and Rymer. In the Predominate Stakes (usually a trial race for the Epsom Derby) over a mile and a half at Goodwood Racecourse later that month he won again, beating Live Arrow by six lengths. Walwyn opted not to run English Prince in the Epsom Derby, believing that the colt was still immature and would be unsuited by the course. At Royal Ascot on 20 June English Prince, with Eddery again in the saddle, started the 8/11 favourite for the Group Two King Edward VII Stakes against five opponents including Royal Empire (runner-up in the Prix Jean de Chaudenay), Honoured Guest (winner of the Dante Stakes) and Straight As A Die (Royal Lodge Stakes). English won in race record time from Straight As A Die, to whom he was conceding four pounds.

Nine days after his win at Ascot, English Prince was sent to Ireland to contest the Irish Sweeps Derby at the Curragh with the French champion Yves Saint-Martin taking over the ride from Eddery, who was serving a suspension. Roger Hue-Williams' Imperial Prince, runner-up to Snow Knight in the Epsom Derby, started favourite ahead of the French-trained colts Caracolero (Prix du Jockey Club) and Mississipian (Grand Critérium) with English Prince fourth in the betting at odds of 8/1 in a field of thirteen which also included the Irish 2000 Guineas winner Furry Glen. Saint-Martin kept the colt in the first three from the start before going to the front half a mile from the finish and establishing a clear advantage in the straight. English Prince stayed on strongly in the closing stages to win by one and a half lengths from Imperial Prince with Mississipian finishing third ahead of Sir Penfro with Furry Glen seventh, Caracolero eighth and the future Irish St Leger winner Mistigri in tenth. After the race Saint-Martin said that the winner "always ran beautifully, and was all ready to go when I urged him to do so". Mississipian was demoted from third to fourth following a stewards' inquiry. English Prince was regarded as a leading contender for the St Leger Stakes, but had a series of minor training problems before he appeared for his trial race, the Great Voltigeur Stakes at York Racecourse. He looked impressive before the race and started favourite, but after taking the lead in the straight he proved no match for Bustino and was beaten four lengths into second place. On returning from the race, the colt was found to be suffering from soreness in his right foreleg. The injury did not respond to treatment: he was withdrawn from the St Leger and did not race again.

== Assessment ==
There was no International Classification of European three-year-olds in 1974: the official handicappers of Britain, Ireland and France compiled separate rankings for horses which competed in those countries. In the British handicap English Prince was rated the ninth best three-year-old colt of the season, six pounds behind Take A Reef. The independent Timeform organisation gave him a rating of 129 one pound behind the best British-trained colts Bustino and Giacometti, and two pounds behind the French three-year-olds Nonoalco, Sagaro, Dankaro, Caracolero and Comtesse de Loir.

== Stud record ==
English Prince was retired from racing to become a breeding stallion, beginning his stud career at the Ballylinch Stud in County Kilkenny at a fee of £2,000. His early results were not impressive and in 1980 he was sold and exported to Japan where he died in 1983. His last three European crops boosted his reputation as a stallion after his departure to Japan. In 1982 his three-year-old daughter Prince's Polly won the Irish 1000 Guineas (beating On The House), whilst his four-year-old son Evzon took the Queen's Vase at Royal Ascot. In the following year the three-year-old filly Sun Princess emerged as the best of English Prince's offspring, winning The Oaks by twelve lengths, the Yorkshire Oaks and the St Leger as well as finishing second in the Prix de l'Arc de Triomphe.

== Pedigree ==
Pedigree of English Prince (IRE), bay stallion, 1971
Sire Petingo (GB) 1965	Petition (GB); 1944	Fair Trial	Fairway
Sire Petingo (GB) 1965	Petition (GB); 1944	Fair Trial	Lady Juror
Sire Petingo (GB) 1965	Petition (GB); 1944	Art Paper	Artists Proof
Sire Petingo (GB) 1965	Petition (GB); 1944	Art Paper	Quire
Sire Petingo (GB) 1965	Alcazar (FR); 1957	Alycidon	Donatello
Sire Petingo (GB) 1965	Alcazar (FR); 1957	Alycidon	Aurora
Sire Petingo (GB) 1965	Alcazar (FR); 1957	Quarterdeck	Nearco
Sire Petingo (GB) 1965	Alcazar (FR); 1957	Quarterdeck	Poker Chip
Dam English Miss (GB) 1955	Bois Roussel (FR); 1935	Vatout	Prince Chimay
Dam English Miss (GB) 1955	Bois Roussel (FR); 1935	Vatout	Vashti
Dam English Miss (GB) 1955	Bois Roussel (FR); 1935	Plucky Liege	Spearmint
Dam English Miss (GB) 1955	Bois Roussel (FR); 1935	Plucky Liege	Concertina
Dam English Miss (GB) 1955	Virelle (FR); 1942	Casterari	Fiterari
Dam English Miss (GB) 1955	Virelle (FR); 1942	Casterari	Castleline
Dam English Miss (GB) 1955	Virelle (FR); 1942	Perfume	Badruddin
Dam English Miss (GB) 1955	Virelle (FR); 1942	Perfume	Lavendula (Family: 1-w)
