= Woodstream =

American-bred Thoroughbred racehorse

- Sire: Northern Dancer
- Grandsire: Nearctic
- Dam: Rule Formi
- Damsire: Forli
- Sex: Mare
- Foaled: 14 May 1979
- Country: United States
- Colour: Chestnut
- Breeder: Swettenham Stud
- Owner: Robert Sangster
- Trainer: Vincent O'Brien
- Record: 6: 4-1-0

Major wins
- Moyglare Stud Stakes (1981); Cheveley Park Stakes (1981)

Awards
- Timeform rating 113 (1981), 108 (1982); Top-rated Irish two-year-old filly (1981)

Woodstream (14 May 1979 – after 2003) was an American-bred, Irish-trained Thoroughbred racehorse and broodmare. In a racing career which lasted from July 1981 until June 1982, she won four of her six races and finished second one. As a two-year-old she was rated the best filly of her age in Ireland after being unbeaten in four starts. After winning two minor races she was awarded the Moyglare Stud Stakes on the disqualification of Sweet Side and then traveled to England to win the Group One Cheveley Park Stakes. In the following year she finished second in the Irish 1,000 Guineas but was retired after running poorly in the Coronation Stakes. She had some success as a broodmare, although she produced no major winners.

== Background ==
Woodstream was a "strong, very attractive" chestnut mare with a large white star and two white socks bred in Maryland by Robert Sangster's Swettenham Stud. She was one of many important winners sired by Northern Dancer, who won the Kentucky Derby in 1964 before becoming one of the most successful breeding stallions in Thoroughbred history. Woodstream was the third foal of Rule Formi, an unraced daughter of the Argentinian champion Forli, making her a half-sister to Jaazeiro. Rule Formi's dam, Miss Nasrullah, was a half-sister to Prince John.

The filly was sent to race in Europe where she was trained by Vincent O'Brien at Ballydoyle.

== Racing career ==
=== 1981: two-year-old season ===
Woodstream began her racing career in July 1981 when she contested a maiden race over six furlongs at Phoenix Park Racecourse and won by a length from Miss Lillian. In August she was moved up in distance for a minor race over seven furlongs at Leopardstown Racecourse. Ridden by Pat Eddery she took the race by a neck from Prince's Polly, appearing to win more easily than the margin indicated. On her next appearance, Woodstream was moved up in class and started favourite for the Group Two Moyglare Stud Stakes over six furlongs at the Curragh. She moved up to dispute the lead approaching the final furlong and looked the likely winner but was strongly challenged by the 50/1 outsider Sweet Side and beaten into second place. The winner however, had veered left and right in the closing stages, hampering both Woodstream and the third-placed finisher Santa Roseanna: after a stewards inquiry Sweet Side was demoted to third and the race was awarded to Woodstream.

On her final appearance of the season, Woodstream was sent to England for the Cheveley Park Stakes at Newmarket Racecourse on 30 September, which, at the time, the race was the only Group One contest in either Britain or Ireland restricted to juvenile fillies. With Eddery again in the saddle, started the 5/2 joint-favourite alongside the British-trained On the House. The other fancied runners in the thirteen runner field were Hollow Heart, Plum Bold and Admiral's Princess. Woodstream raced in mid-division before moving forward in the last quarter mile and went to the front a furlong out alongside On the House. In the closing stages she drew away from the British filly and won by one and a half lengths with Admiral's Princess a length and a half away in third.

=== 1982: three-year-old season ===
Woodstream was aimed at the 1000 Guineas at The Oaks in 1982, but took longer than expected to reach full fitness and missed the former race, which was won in her absence by On the House. She made her seasonal debut in the Irish 1,000 Guineas at the Curragh on 22 May and started 7/2 second favourite behind On the House in a twenty-four runner field. Woddstream appeared to be going well when moving into fourth with a quarter mile left to run but then began to hang to the right and was beaten a length by Prince's Polly, with On the House a short head away in third place. Her connections opted to bypass the Oaks and the filly made her next appearance in the Coronation Stakes (then a Group Two race) at Royal Ascot in June. She sweated up badly before the race, fought against her jockey's attempts to restrain her in the early stages and eventually finished seventh of the eight runners behind Chalon. She never raced again and was retired at the end of the season.

== Assessment ==
In the International Classification for 1981, Woodstream was the top-rated two-year-old filly trained in Ireland and the fifth-best filly of her age in Europe. The independent Timeform organisation gave her a rating of 113, nine pounds below their top-rated two-year-old filly Circus Ring. In the following year she was rated 108 by Timeform and was the third highest rated three-year-old filly in the Irish Free Handicap.

== Breeding record ==
Woodstream was retired from racing to become a broodmare. She was exported to Japan in 1993. She produced at least sixteen foals and nine winners between 1984 and 2003:

- Lord Chancellor, a chestnut colt, foaled in 1984, sired by Alydar. Unraced.
- Alpine Stream, bay filly, 1985, by Seattle Slew. Failed to win in two races.
- Seattle Centre, bay colt, 1986, by Seattle Slew. Won one race.
- Tributary, brown filly, 1987, by Seattle Slew. Won one race.
- Head of Chambers, grey colt (later gelded), 1988, by Alleged. Failed to win in two races.
- Cross Examine, bay colt, 1989, by Law Society. Unraced.
- Crystal Lake, bay filly, 1991, by Shirley Heights. Won one race.
- Royal Canal, bay colt, 1992, by Shirley Heights. Won one race.
- Wedgewood, chestnut filly, 1993, by Woodman. Unraced.
- Biwa Primula, chestnut filly, 1994, by Woodman. Won four races.
- Biwa Dia, chestnut filly, 1996, by Golden Pheasant. Unraced.
- Teio Monana, chestnut colt, 1998, by Timber Country. Won fifteen races.
- Chiko, chestnut colt, 1999, by Timber Country. Won one race.
- Tsunami Go Go, chestnut colt, 2000, by Timber Country. Won one race.
- Silk Rosemary, chestnut filly, 2001, by Timber Country. Won one race.
- Fukuno Flash, chestnut colt, 2003, by Brocco. Failed to win in five races.

== Pedigree ==
Pedigree of Woodstream (USA), chestnut mare, 1979
Sire Northern Dancer (CAN) 1961	Nearctic (CAN); 1954	Nearco	Pharos
Sire Northern Dancer (CAN) 1961	Nearctic (CAN); 1954	Nearco	Nogara
Sire Northern Dancer (CAN) 1961	Nearctic (CAN); 1954	Lady Angela	Hyperion
Sire Northern Dancer (CAN) 1961	Nearctic (CAN); 1954	Lady Angela	Sister Sarah
Sire Northern Dancer (CAN) 1961	Natalma (USA); 1957	Native Dancer	Polynesian
Sire Northern Dancer (CAN) 1961	Natalma (USA); 1957	Native Dancer	Geisha
Sire Northern Dancer (CAN) 1961	Natalma (USA); 1957	Almahmoud	Mahmoud
Sire Northern Dancer (CAN) 1961	Natalma (USA); 1957	Almahmoud	Arbitrator
Dam Rule Formi (USA) 1969	Forli (ARG); 1963	Aristophanes	Hyperion
Dam Rule Formi (USA) 1969	Forli (ARG); 1963	Aristophanes	Commotion
Dam Rule Formi (USA) 1969	Forli (ARG); 1963	Trevisa	Advocate
Dam Rule Formi (USA) 1969	Forli (ARG); 1963	Trevisa	Veneta
Dam Rule Formi (USA) 1969	Miss Nasrullah (USA); 1958	Nasrullah	Nearco
Dam Rule Formi (USA) 1969	Miss Nasrullah (USA); 1958	Nasrullah	Mumtaz Begum
Dam Rule Formi (USA) 1969	Miss Nasrullah (USA); 1958	Not Afraid	Count Fleet
Dam Rule Formi (USA) 1969	Miss Nasrullah (USA); 1958	Not Afraid	Banish Fear (Family 14-f)
