= Swiftfoot =

British-bred Thoroughbred racehorse

- Sire: Run the Gantlet
- Grandsire: Tom Rolfe
- Dam: Whitefoot
- Damsire: Relko
- Sex: Mare
- Foaled: 5 February 1979
- Country: United Kingdom
- Colour: Bay
- Breeder: Herbert Robin Cayzer, 2nd Baron Rotherwick
- Owner: Lord Rotherwick
- Trainer: Dick Hern
- Record: 8: 4-1-1

Major wins
- Cheshire Oaks (1982); Irish Oaks (1982); Park Hill Stakes (1982)

Awards
- Top-rated three-year-old filly in Ireland (1982); Timeform rating: 92 (1981), 119 (1982)

Swiftfoot (5 February 1979 – after 1988) was a British Thoroughbred racehorse and broodmare. She showed some promise as a two-year-old in 1981 when she won easily on her racecourse debut and finished fourth behind male opponents on her only other start. In the following year she emerged as one of the best staying fillies of her generation, winning the Cheshire Oaks, Irish Oaks and Park Hill Stakes as well as finishing second in the Yorkshire Oaks and third in the Irish St. Leger. After her retirement from racing she produced four foals, three of whom won races.

== Background ==
Swiftfoot was a "well-made, attractive" bay mare with a white blaze and a white sock on her right hind leg bred at the Cornbury Stud in Oxfordshire by her owner Herbert Robin Cayzer, 2nd Baron Rotherwick. The filly was sent into training with Dick Hern at West Ilsley in Berkshire

She was sired by Run the Gantlet, an American stallion whose biggest win came in the 1971 edition of the Washington, D.C. International Stakes. After being retired to stud duty in Ireland he proved to be a very successful breeding stallion and a strong influence for stamina with his best runners including Ardross, Providential, April Run and Commanche Run. Swiftfoot's dam Whitefoot showed good racing ability as a three-year-old when she won the Musidora Stakes in 1970. She was a granddaughter of the British broodmare Mitrailleuse (foaled 1944) whose other descendants have included Full Dress, One in a Million, Commanche Run, Creag-An-Sgor, Milligram and One So Wonderful.

== Racing career ==
=== 1981: two-year-old season ===
On her racecourse debut, Swiftfoot started favourite against five opponents in the Rose of Lancaster Stakes (not the current race of the same name) over seven furlongs at Haydock Park in July. She looked less than fully fit but "outclassed" her rivals to win by two and a half lengths. On her only other race of the year she was matched against male opposition in the Sandwich Stakes over one mile at Goodwood Racecourse in September and finished fourth behind the colts Jalmood, Vin St Benet and Padalco.

=== 1982: three-year-old season ===
Swiftfoot began her second season in the Cheshire Oaks (a trial for The Oaks) over one and a half miles at Chester Racecourse in May. Ridden by Willie Carson she led from the start in a slowly-run race and won by three lengths from the Jeremy Tree-trained Epithet.

In the Oaks at Epsom Racecourse on 5 June Carson opted to ride the Hern stable's other runner Cut Loose, leaving the ride on Swiftfoot to Greville Starkey. She was travelling well in the early stages but "choked" soon after entering the straight and was eased down by Starkey to finish last of the thirteen runners behind Time Charter. Hern was never able to explain the incident and said that nothing similar happened to the filly before or after. Twelve days after her run at Epsom the filly was sent to Ireland to contest the Irish Oaks on good to firm ground at the Curragh and started the 4/1 second favourite behind the Irish 1,000 Guineas winner Prince's Polly in a ten-runner field. The other fancied contenders were Santa Roseanna (winner of the Minstrel Stakes), Rosananti (Premio Regina Elena), Cooliney Princess and More Heather (C L Weld Park Stakes). With Carson in the saddle, Swiftfoot took the lead from the start and extended her advantage early in the straight. Prince's Polly emerged as her only challenger ibut never looked a serious threat, and Swiftfoot drew away in the closing stage to win by three lengths with a gap of three lengths back to Rosananti in third. The racecourse stewards inquired into the winner's improvement but accepted Hern's explanation. On 17 August Swiftfoot started 11/4 favourite in a seven-runner field for the Yorkshire Oaks at York Racecourse. She took the lead from her stablemate Height of Fashion early in the straight and maintained a narrow lead entering the final furlong but was overtaken in the closing stages and beaten a neck by Awaasif with the Ribblesdale Stakes winner Dish Dash a head away in third.

At Doncaster Racecourse in September, Swiftfoot was moved up in distance for the Group Two Park Hill Stakes and started the 4/6 favourite against four opponents including Sing Softly (Lancashire Oaks) and Tants (Lingfield Oaks Trial). Carson sent the favourite to the front and set a steady pace before increasing the tempo in the straight. Swiftfoot repelled a challenge from Tants, went clear of her opponents in the last furlong and on by one and a half lengths from Sa-Vegas despite being eased down in the final strides. Although there were suggestions that the filly might turn out again in the St Leger over the same course and distance two days later she did not reappear until 9 October when she started second favourite for the Irish St. Leger at the Curragh. Racing on soft ground she failed to reproduce her best form and finished third behind Touching Wood and Father Rooney, beaten ten lengths by the winner.

== Assessment ==
In 1981 the independent Timeform organisation gave Swiftfoot a rating of 92, making her 30 pounds inferior to their best two-year-old filly Circus Ring. In the following year the Irish Free Handicap rated her the best three-year-old filly to race in Ireland. She received a rating of 119 from Timeform, 12 pounds behind the Prix de l'Arc de Triomphe winner Akiyda, who was their best three-year-old filly. In their annual Racehorses of 1982 Timeform described her as "genuine and consistent" and "well-suited by a test of stamina".

== Breeding record ==
At the end of her racing career Swiftfoot was retired to become a broodmare at her owner's stud. She produced four foals and three winners from 1985 to 1988:

- Bannister, a bay colt (later gelded), foaled in 1985, sired by Known Fact. Won one flat race and four hurdle races.
- Lakefoot, bay filly, 1986, by Kings Lake. Unplaced on only start.
- Harefoot, bay filly, 1987, by Rainbow Quest. Won one race.
- Bravefoot, bay colt, 1988, by Dancing Brave. Won two flat races and five hurdle races.

== Pedigree ==
Pedigree of Swiftfoot (GB), bay mare, 1979
Sire Run the Gantlet (USA) 1968	Tom Rolfe (USA); 1962	Ribot	Tenerani
Sire Run the Gantlet (USA) 1968	Tom Rolfe (USA); 1962	Ribot	Romanella
Sire Run the Gantlet (USA) 1968	Tom Rolfe (USA); 1962	Pocahontas	Roman
Sire Run the Gantlet (USA) 1968	Tom Rolfe (USA); 1962	Pocahontas	How
Sire Run the Gantlet (USA) 1968	First Feather (USA); 1963	First Landing	Turn-To
Sire Run the Gantlet (USA) 1968	First Feather (USA); 1963	First Landing	Hildene
Sire Run the Gantlet (USA) 1968	First Feather (USA); 1963	Quill	Princequillo
Sire Run the Gantlet (USA) 1968	First Feather (USA); 1963	Quill	Quick Touch
Dam Whitefoot (GB) 1967	Relko (GB); 1960	Tanerko	Tantieme
Dam Whitefoot (GB) 1967	Relko (GB); 1960	Tanerko	La Divine
Dam Whitefoot (GB) 1967	Relko (GB); 1960	Relance	Relic
Dam Whitefoot (GB) 1967	Relko (GB); 1960	Relance	Polaire
Dam Whitefoot (GB) 1967	Mitraille (GB); 1953	Big Game	Bahram
Dam Whitefoot (GB) 1967	Mitraille (GB); 1953	Big Game	Myrobella
Dam Whitefoot (GB) 1967	Mitraille (GB); 1953	Mitrailleuse	Mieuxce
Dam Whitefoot (GB) 1967	Mitraille (GB); 1953	Mitrailleuse	French Kin (Family: 16-h)
