= Charles Belmont Davis =

Writer, drama critic, and publisher

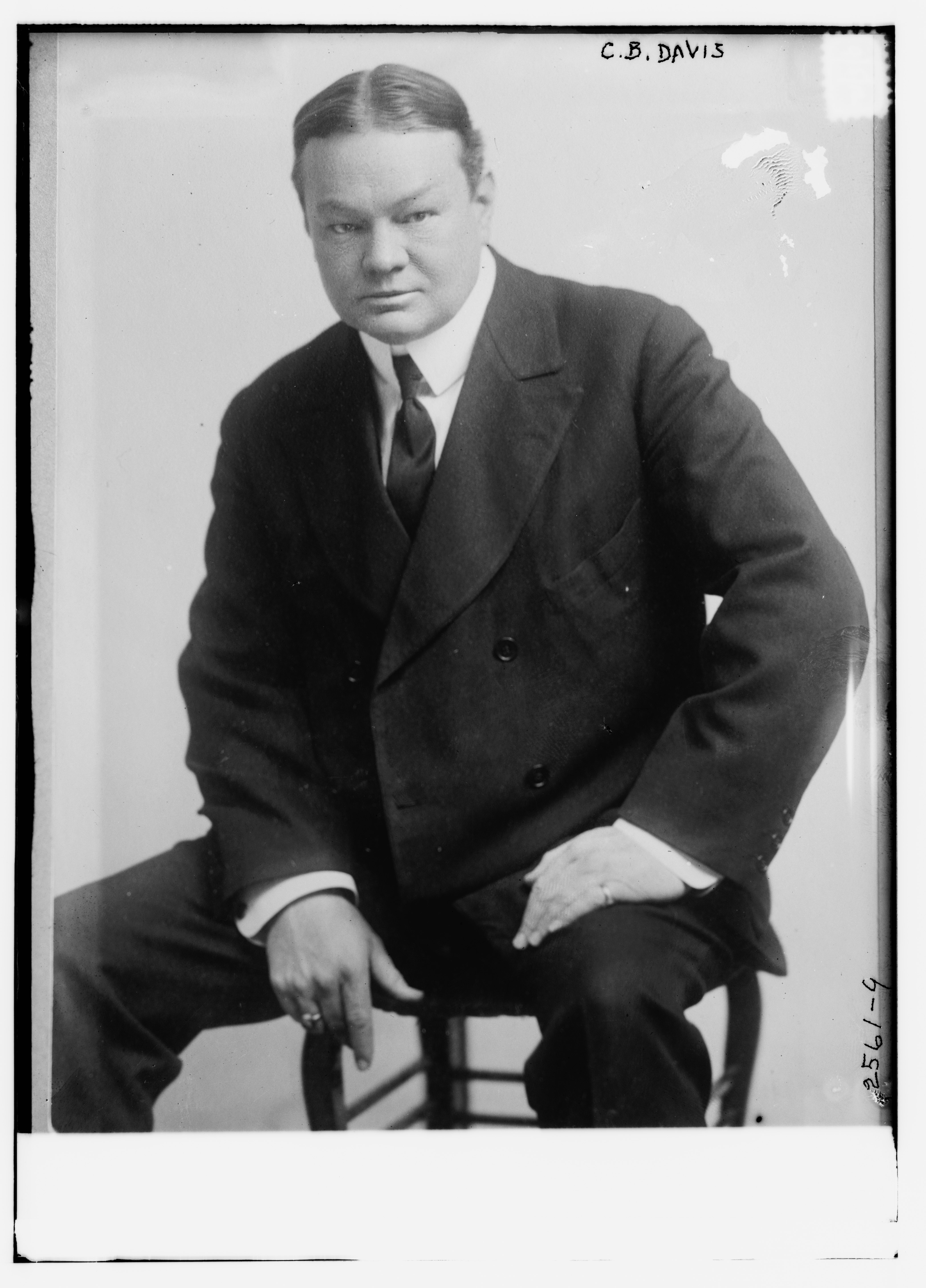
Charles Belmont Davis

Charles Belmont Davis (January 24, 1866 in Philadelphia, Pennsylvania –1926) was a writer, drama critic, and publisher. Several of his stories were adapted into films including his short story "The Octopus" which was adapted into Mother o' Mine (1921). His short story "When Johnny Comes Marching Home" which appeared in the October 1914 issue of Metropolitan Magazine was adapted into The Home Stretch (1921). His story "Handle with Care" was adapted into the 1922 film Handle with Care.

He wrote a couple stories for Harper's Magazine.

His mother was pioneering writer and social reformer Rebecca Harding Davis and his older brother was Richard Harding Davis. The brothers attended Lehigh University and were involved in establishing its drama club. Davis served as U. S. Consul to Florence from 1893 to 1897.

Davis married Dai Turgeon in 1914; they divorced in 1921.

== Bibliography ==
- The Borderland of Society, H. S. Stone & Co., New York (1898), a collection of short stories
- Nothing a Year (1916)
- The Stage Door, C. Scribner's sons, New York (1908)
- Tales of the Town (1911)
- The Lodger Overhead, and other stories, Charles Scribner's, New York
- In Another Moment
- Adventures and Letters of Richard Harding (1917)
- Her Own Sort
- In Another Moment

== Filmography ==
- Mother o' Mine (1921)
- The Home Stretch (1921)
- Handle with Care (1922 film)
