= Handle with Care (1922 film) =

1922 film directed by Phil Rosen

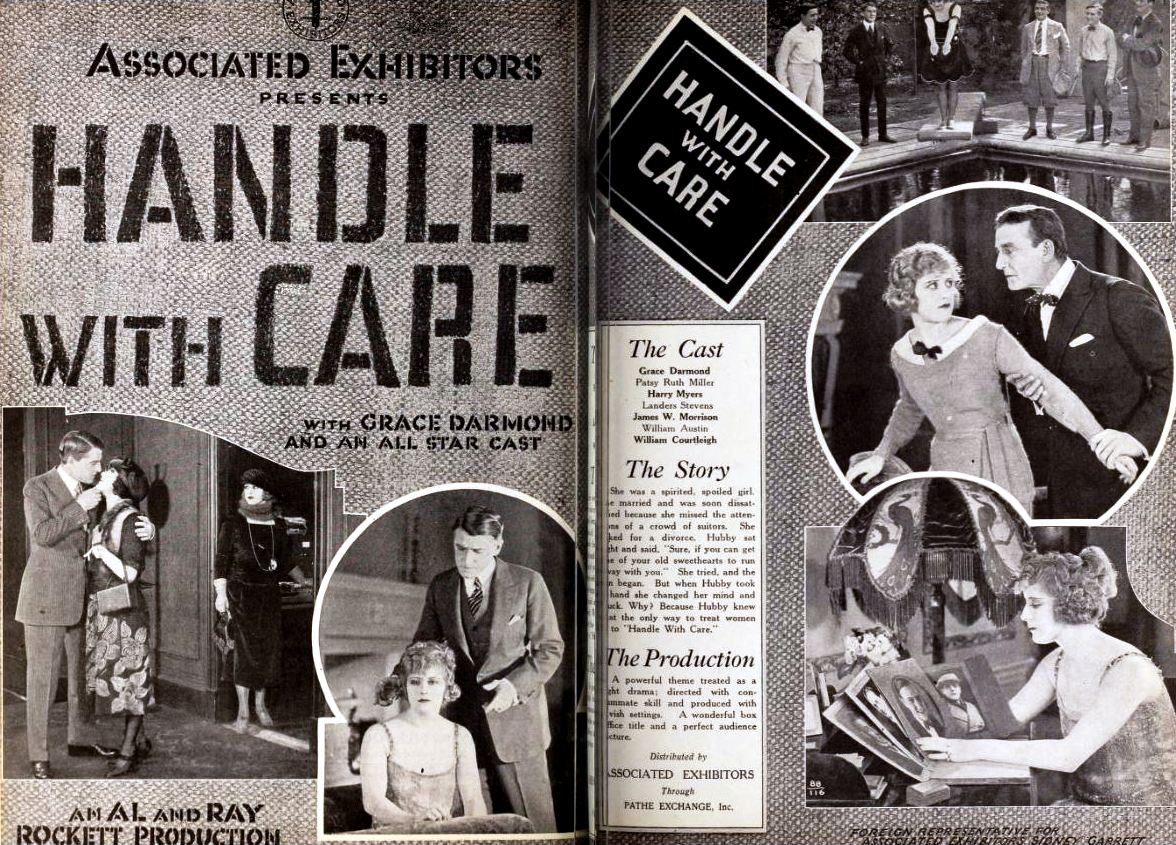
- Advertisement
- Directed by: Phil Rosen
- Written by: Will M. Ritchie
- Based on: the short story, "Handle With Care" by Charles Belmont Davis
- Produced by: Al Rockett; Ray Rockett
- Starring: Grace Darmond; Harry Myers; James Morrison
- Cinematography: Philip Hurn
- Production company: Rockett Film Corp.
- Distributed by: Associated Exhibitors
- Release date: January 22, 1922 (US)
- Running time: 5 reels
- Country: United States
- Language: Silent (English intertitles)

Handle with Care is a 1922 American silent comedy film directed by Phil Rosen. It stars Grace Darmond, Harry Myers, and James Morrison, and was released on January 22, 1922.

== Plot ==
As described in a film magazine, Jeanne Lee (Darmond) has been wooed by five young men. She finally makes up her mind and marries one of them, David Norris (Stevens). Everything goes well until David, engrossed in his business, becomes neglectful and gets mixed up on the date of his wedding anniversary. Jeanne is indignant and intimates that a divorce is the only solution. David consents to this on the condition that she persuade one of her former suitors to elope with her while he proves that he is really worthy of her. She tries one suitor after the other, but meets with failure. The first has become infatuated with another young woman and is consequently disinterested in eloping with Jeanne. The second one proves his unworthiness when he agrees to accept $10,000 from David to not elope with his wife. The third one, who had one declared that he was ready to die for her, suddenly has a change of heart when confronted with the opportunity to do so. By this time, the young wife has become convinced that it is her husband that she loves after all. The fourth suitor demands that Jeanne elope with him, but she has had enough. This convinces her husband that she learned her lesson through his careful handling. It turns out that the proffer of the last suitor was a frame-up and that he has actually married Marian (Miller), a ward of David's. Together the two couples leave on a tour of foreign lands.

== Cast list ==
- Grace Darmond as Jeanne Lee
- Harry Myers as Ned Picard
- James Morrison as Phil Burnham
- Landers Stevens as David Norris
- William Austin as Peter Carter
- William Courtleigh as MacCullough
- Patsy Ruth Miller as Marian
