= Night Off =

Irish-bred Thoroughbred racehorse

- Sire: Narrator
- Grandsire: Nearco
- Dam: Persuader
- Damsire: Petition
- Sex: Mare
- Foaled: 1962
- Country: Ireland
- Colour: Bay
- Breeder: Major Lionel Brook Holliday
- Owner: Lionel Holliday
- Trainer: Walter Wharton
- Record: 8: 2-1-0

Major wins
- Cheveley Park Stakes (1964); 1000 Guineas (1965)

Awards
- Top-rated British two-year-old filly (1964); Timeform rating 124 in 1964, 113 in 1965

Night Off (1962 – after 1978) was an Irish-bred, British-trained Thoroughbred racehorse and broodmare best known for winning the classic 1000 Guineas in 1965. Despite running only twice in 1964 she was the top-rated filly in Britain after a win in the Cheveley Park Stakes. After recovering from illness to win the 1000 Guineas in April 1965 her form deteriorated, with a second place at Royal Ascot being her only notable performance in five subsequent races. She had some success as a broodmare, despite producing only five foals.

== Background ==
Night Off was a bay mare with no white markings bred by her owner, Major Lionel Brook Holliday at his Cleaboy stud in County Westmeath. Holliday sent the filly to his private La Grange stable at Newmarket, Suffolk where she was trained by Walter Wharton.

Night Off was the most notable racehorse sired by Holliday's stallion Narrator, who won the Champion Stakes and the Coronation Cup for his owner in the mid-1950s. Her dam, Persuader, won five races including the 1956 Horris Hill Stakes, and produced several other winners including Night Off's full brother No Argument. Persuader's dam Palma Rosa, was a French-bred mare bought by Holliday from Marcel Boussac for 10,500 guineas.

== Racing career ==
=== 1964: two-year-old season ===
Night Off made her first racecourse appearance at Newmarket Racecourse in August when she finished second in the Prendergast Stakes. At the same course in late September she was moved up in class to contest the Cheveley Park Stakes, Britain's most prestigious race for two-year-old fillies. Ridden by Joe Mercer she started at odds of 20/1 and won from the odds-on favourite Fall In Love with Greengage in third place. In the Free Handicap, a rating of the best two-year-olds to have raced in Britain that year, she was the top-rated filly, nine pounds behind the leading colt Double Jump.

=== 1965: three-year-old season ===
In the spring of 1965, Night Off was one of many British horses to be affected by a respiratory infection which disrupted her training. Despite her problems she recovered sufficiently to contest the 1000 Guineas over the Rowley Mile course at Newmarket on 29 April. The filly was ridden by the Australian jockey Bill Williamson and started the 9/2 favourite in a field of sixteen. Night Off won the classic by a neck from Yami, with Mabel three lengths away in third. Night Off was then aimed at the Oaks, but when tried over ten furlongs in the Musidora Stakes at York Racecourse she finished unplaced behind Arctic Melody. On 21 May, Night Off was withdrawn from the Oaks by Holliday who thought she had been drugged or poisoned, stating that the filly was "in a terrible state, almost dead." A drug test was administered by the Jockey Club but was negative.

In June Night Off was brought back in distance for the Coronation Stakes over a mile at Royal Ascot. She looked the likely winner in the straight but was caught on the line and beaten a short head by Greengage. Her form then tailed off and she ran poorly in her three remaining races before being retired at the end of the year.

== Assessment ==
The independent Timeform organisation awarded Night Off a rating of 124 in 1964, making her one of the highest rated two-year-old fillies in Europe. In 1965, however, she was given a rating of 113, one of the lowest ever given to a classic winner, and thirteen pounds behind the top-rated three-year-old filly Aunt Edith. In their book A Century of Champions, based on a modified version of the Timeform system John Randall and Tony Morris rated Night Off a "poor" winner of the 1000 Guineas.

== Stud career ==
Night Off produced only five foals in twelve years at stud, but three of them were winners. The best of her progeny was the filly Madame's Share (sired by Major Portion) who won Prix d'Astarte in 1971. Another of her daughters, Sweet Relations, produced Montekin, winner of the 1983 Waterford Crystal Mile. Her son Baldur, (by Breton), showed promise as a two-year-old in 1974 when he finished third to Grundy in the Dewhurst Stakes but he did not go on to any major successes.

== Pedigree ==
Pedigree of Night Off (IRE), bay mare, 1962
Sire Narrator (GB) 1951	Nearco (ITY); 1935	Pharos	Phalaris
Sire Narrator (GB) 1951	Nearco (ITY); 1935	Pharos	Scapa Flow
Sire Narrator (GB) 1951	Nearco (ITY); 1935	Nogara	Havresac
Sire Narrator (GB) 1951	Nearco (ITY); 1935	Nogara	Catnip
Sire Narrator (GB) 1951	Phase (GB); 1939	Windsor Lad	Blandford
Sire Narrator (GB) 1951	Phase (GB); 1939	Windsor Lad	Resplendent
Sire Narrator (GB) 1951	Phase (GB); 1939	Lost Soul	Solario
Sire Narrator (GB) 1951	Phase (GB); 1939	Lost Soul	Orlass
Dam Persuader (GB) 1954	Petition (GB); 1944	Fair Trial	Fairway
Dam Persuader (GB) 1954	Petition (GB); 1944	Fair Trial	Lady Juror
Dam Persuader (GB) 1954	Petition (GB); 1944	Art Paper	Artist's Proof
Dam Persuader (GB) 1954	Petition (GB); 1944	Art Paper	Quire
Dam Persuader (GB) 1954	Palma Rosa (GB); 1941	Mahmoud	Blenheim
Dam Persuader (GB) 1954	Palma Rosa (GB); 1941	Mahmoud	Mah Mahal
Dam Persuader (GB) 1954	Palma Rosa (GB); 1941	Tsianina	Asterus
Dam Persuader (GB) 1954	Palma Rosa (GB); 1941	Tsianina	Merry Girl (Family: 16-g)
