= Mother o' Mine (1921 film) =

1921 film

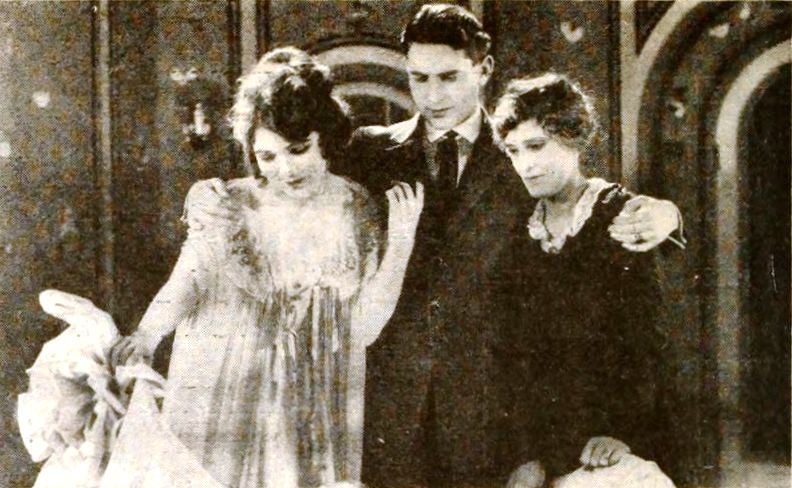
- Film still with Betty Ross Clarke, Lloyd Hughes, Claire McDowell
- Directed by: Fred Niblo
- Written by: C. Gardner Sullivan
- Based on: "The Octopus" by Charles Belmont Davis
- Produced by: Thomas H. Ince
- Starring: Lloyd Hughes; Betty Ross Clarke
- Cinematography: Henry Sharp
- Distributed by: Associated Producers
- Release date: June 5, 1921
- Running time: 70 minutes
- Country: United States
- Language: Silent (English intertitles)

Mother o' Mine is a 1921 American silent drama film that was directed by Fred Niblo. It written by C. Gardner Sullivan based on the short story "The Octopus" by Charles Belmont Davis. A complete print of the film exists in the Library of Congress as well as its trailer.

== Plot ==
As described in a film publication, several years earlier Mrs. Sheldon (McDowell) had been deserted by her husband. She brought up her son Robert (Hughes) in the belief that his father was dead. His desire to make good in the city leads his mother to send him to his father, Willard Thatcher (Kilgour). Unknown to him, Robert is now working for his own father, and all goes well until he learns of his father's nefarious financial schemes. They end up fighting, and Willard tells Robert that while he is married to his mother, Robert is not his son. Willard is accidentally killed, and on the evidence of Fan Baxter (Blythe), Willard's woman, Robert is condemned. A last minute forced confession from Fan by Robert's mother saves the day.

== Cast ==
- Lloyd Hughes as Robert Sheldon
- Betty Ross Clarke as Dolly Wilson
- Betty Blythe as Fan Baxter
- Joseph Kilgour as Willard Thatcher
- Claire McDowell as Mrs. Sheldon
- Andrew Robson as District Attorney
- Andrew Arbuckle as Henry Godfrey
