= Turgeon =

Surname

Turgeon is a surname. Notable people with the surname include:

== Athletics ==
- Frédérique Turgeon (born 1999), Canadian para-alpine skier
- Mélanie Turgeon (born 1976), Canadian skier
- Mark Turgeon (born 1965), college basketball coach
- Mathieu Turgeon (born 1979), Canadian trampoline gymnast
- Pete Turgeon (1897-1977), baseball player
- Pierre Turgeon (born 1969), ice hockey player
- Sylvain Turgeon (born 1965), ice hockey player

== Politics ==
- Abraham Turgeon (1783-1851), notary and political figure in Canada East
- Adélard Turgeon (1863-1930), Canadian lawyer and politician
- James Gray Turgeon (1879-1964), broker, soldier and a provincial and federal level politician from Canada
- J. B. Turgeon (1810-1897), the first French-Canadian mayor of Bytown, Canada
- Joseph Turgeon (1751-1831), master carpenter and political figure in Lower Canada
- Joseph-Ovide Turgeon (1797-1856), Quebec official and political figure
- Louis Turgeon (1762-1827), notary, seigneur and political figure in Lower Canada
- Onésiphore Turgeon (1849-1944), Canadian parliamentarian
- William Ferdinand Alphonse Turgeon (1877-1969), Canadian politician, judge, and diplomat

== Other ==
- Charlotte Turgeon (1912-2009), American chef and author
- Dai Turgeon, Canadian stage actress
- Frances Turgeon Wiggin (1891-1985), American author and composer
- Marie-Élisabeth Turgeon (1840-1881), Canadian Roman Catholic religious sister and Blessed
- Pierre Turgeon (born 1947), a Canadian novelist and essayist
- Pierre-Flavien Turgeon (1787-1867), Canadian Roman Catholic priest and Archbishop of Quebec
- Serge Turgeon (1946-2004), Quebec actor and union leader
