= Bachir =

Irish-bred Thoroughbred racehorse

- Sire: Desert Style
- Grandsire: Green Desert
- Dam: Morning Welcome
- Damsire: Be My Guest
- Sex: Stallion
- Foaled: 8 March 1997
- Country: Ireland
- Colour: Bay
- Breeder: Kevin and Meta Cullen
- Owner: Sheikh Mohammed; Godolphin
- Trainer: John Gosden; Saeed bin Suroor
- Record: 10: 5-1-2
- Earnings: £401,023

Major wins
- Richmond Stakes (1999); UAE 2000 Guineas (2000); Poule d'Essai des Poulains (2000); Irish 2000 Guineas (2000)

Bachir (foaled 8 March 1997) is an Irish Thoroughbred racehorse and sire. In a racing career which lasted from July 1999 until August 2000 he won five of his ten races and recorded major victories in four different countries. As a juvenile in 1999 he showed top-class form by winning the Richmond Stakes and finishing third in both the Prix Morny and Prix de la Salamandre. In the following spring he was sent to Dubai where he won the UAE 2000 Guineas before returning to Europe to take the Poule d'Essai des Poulains and the Irish 2000 Guineas. He ran disappointingly in two subsequent races and was retired from racing at the end of the year. Bachir has stood as a breeding stallion in Ireland and Japan but has made little impact as a sire of winners.

== Background ==
Bachir is a bay horse with a small white star and white socks on his hind legs bred in Ireland by Kevin and Meta Cullen of the Middlelane Farm near Naas. As a foal in November 1997 he was offered for sale at Goffs and was bought for IR£31,000 by the bloodstock agent Michael Grassick. In October 1998 the yearling returned to the auction ring at Goffs and was sold for IR£50,000 to Sheikh Mohammed's Darley Stud. The colt was initially sent into training with John Gosden at the Stanley House Stables in Newmarket.

He was from the first crop of foals sired by Desert Style, a sprinter whose wins included the Tetrarch Stakes, Ballycorus Stakes and Phoenix Sprint Stakes. As a breeding stallion he also sired Paco Boy, Mandesha, Next Desert (Deutsches Derby), Caradak (Prix de la Forêt) and Desert Blanc (Manhattan Handicap). Bachir's dam Morning Welcome showed no racing ability, failing to win in five races, but did better as a broodmare, producing several other winners including the gelding Albuhera who won twelve races including the Fulke Walwyn Novices' Chase. She was descended from the British broodmare B Flat (foaled 1958) who was the female-line ancestor of Pitcairn (sire of Ela-Mana-Mou), Assessor (Prix Royal Oak, Prix du Cadran) and Invincible Spirit.

== Racing career ==
=== 1999: two-year-old season ===
On his racecourse debut, Bachir started the 5/2 favourite in a maiden race over six furlongs over six furlongs at Chepstow on 3 July. Ridden by Gary Hind he started slowly but took the lead a furlong out and won "easily" by three and a half lengths from the John Dunlop-trained Maestersinger. Frankie Dettori took the ride 25 days later when the colt was stepped up in class for the Group Two Richmond Stakes over the same distance at Goodwood and started 11/8 favourite against six opponents. As in his previous race he started slowly but soon recovered and went to the front a furlong from the finish to win in "comfortable" fashion by one and a half lengths from Hunting Lion.

On 22 August Bachir was sent to France to contest the Group One Prix Morny over 1200 metres at Deauville in which he was ridden by Dominique Boeuf. Racing on very soft ground he was never able to challenge for the lead and finished third behind Fasliyev and Warm Heart (also trained by Gosden). Four weeks later the colt was back in France for the Prix de la Salamandre over 1400 metres at Longchamp. With Boeuf again in the saddle he raced in second place but was unable to make any progress in the closing stages and came home third of the five runners behind Giant's Causeway.

=== 2000: three-year-old season ===
In February 2000 Bachir joined Sheikh Mohammed's Godolphin team and was transferred to the stable of Saeed bin Suroor in Dubai. He began his three-year-old campaign with two races on the dirt track at Nad Al Sheba Racecourse, starting with the UAE 2000 Guineas over one mile on 20 February. He was ridden by Sylvain Guillot and led from the start to win by three quarters of a length and four lengths from his stablemates Interrogate and Zoning. In the UAE Derby on 25 March, with Guillot again in the saddle, Bachir took the lead after two furlongs and led for most of the way but was overtaken in the closing stages and finished second to his stablemate China Visit.

Bachir returned to Godolphin's British base at Newmarket and made his first appearance of the season in Europe in the Poule d'Essai des Poulains over 1600 metres at Longchamp on 14 May in which he was ridden by Dettori. The undefeated Irish colt Monashee Mountain, whose wins included the Killavullan Stakes and the Tetrarch Stakes, started favourite ahead of Berine's Son (Prix de Fontainebleau) with Bachr next in the betting on 3.1/1. The other four runner were Slipstream King (third in the Prix de Fontainebleau), Ekraar (Vintage Stakes), Mon Pote Le Gitan and Valentino. After taking an early lead, Bachir was settled in second place behind Ekraar. He regained the advantage 200 metres from the finish and won by one and a half lengths from Berine's Son with Valentino taking third ahead of Ekraar.

Thirteen days after his win at Longchamp, Bachir was sent to the Curragh for the Irish 2000 Guineas over one mile. He had not been among the original entries for the race, meaning that his owner had to pay a supplementary entry fee of IR£25,000. The top two places in the betting were taken by Giant's Causeway and Barathea Guest who had finished second and third to King's Best in the 2000 Guineas on 6 May. Bachir, ridden by Dettori, was made the 4/1 third choice with the other five runners starting at odds of 16/1 or more. Bachir led from the start and stayed on well under strong pressure to hold off the challenge of Giant's Causeway and win by a neck with Cape Town close behind in third. After the race Dettori said "I had no particular plan but having ridden earlier and realised the ground was perfect and there was no obvious pace in the race, I decided to have my mount prominent from the start. I nicked a length on the favourite two furlongs out and this was a help as he just ran out of ground".

With Dettori convalescing from injuries sustained in a plane crash at Newmarket the American veteran Jerry Bailey took the ride when Bachir faced Giant's Causeway again in the St James's Palace Stakes at Royal Ascot on 20 June. Drawn on the wide outside he led for much of the way before being headed in the straight and was outpaced in the closing stages, finishing sixth of the eleven runners, two and a quarter lengths behind the winner. Dettori resumed the ride when the colt was dropped in class for the Group Two Celebration Mile at Goodwood on 26 August. Carrying top weight of 125 pounds he led for most of the way but faded in the closing stages to finish fifth of the six runners behind Medicean, Observatory, Cape Town and Seazun.

== Stud record ==
At the end of his racing career Bachir was retired to become a breeding stallion at the Kildangan Stud in Ireland. After standing for one season in Ireland he was exported to Japan. In 2007 he was returned to Europe where he was based at the Haras des Brousses in France. He has sired the winners of many minor races but no top-class performers.

== Pedigree ==
Pedigree of Bachir (IRE), stallion, 1997
Sire Desert Style (IRE) 1992	Green Desert (USA); 1983	Danzig	Northern Dancer
Sire Desert Style (IRE) 1992	Green Desert (USA); 1983	Danzig	Pas de Nom
Sire Desert Style (IRE) 1992	Green Desert (USA); 1983	Foreign Courier	Sir Ivor
Sire Desert Style (IRE) 1992	Green Desert (USA); 1983	Foreign Courier	Courtly Dee
Sire Desert Style (IRE) 1992	Organza (GB); 1985	High Top	Derring-Do
Sire Desert Style (IRE) 1992	Organza (GB); 1985	High Top	Camenae
Sire Desert Style (IRE) 1992	Organza (GB); 1985	Canton Silk	Runnymede
Sire Desert Style (IRE) 1992	Organza (GB); 1985	Canton Silk	Clouded Lamp
Dam Morning Welcome (IRE) 1989	Be My Guest (USA); 1974	Northern Dancer	Nearctic
Dam Morning Welcome (IRE) 1989	Be My Guest (USA); 1974	Northern Dancer	Natalma
Dam Morning Welcome (IRE) 1989	Be My Guest (USA); 1974	What A Treat	Tudor Minstrel
Dam Morning Welcome (IRE) 1989	Be My Guest (USA); 1974	What A Treat	Rare Treat
Dam Morning Welcome (IRE) 1989	Dawn Is Breaking (GB); 1978	Import	Porto Bello
Dam Morning Welcome (IRE) 1989	Dawn Is Breaking (GB); 1978	Import	Immortelle
Dam Morning Welcome (IRE) 1989	Dawn Is Breaking (GB); 1978	Brief Chorus	Counsel
Dam Morning Welcome (IRE) 1989	Dawn Is Breaking (GB); 1978	Brief Chorus	B Flat (Family 7-a)

- Bachir was inbred 3 × 4 to Northern Dancer, meaning that this stallion appears in both the third and fourth generations of his pedigree.
