= Sirius Symboli =

Japanese-bred Thoroughbred racehorse

Sirius Symboli シリウスシンボリ
- Sirius Symboli at the 1988 Mainichi Okan.
- Breed: Thoroughbred
- Sire: Mogami
- Grandsire: Lyphard
- Dam: Sweet Epsom
- Damsire: Partholon
- Sex: Stallion
- Foaled: 26 March 1982
- Died: 8 April 2012 (aged 30)
- Country: Japan
- Colour: Bay
- Breeder: Symboli Farm
- Owner: Symboli Farm
- Racing colours
- Trainer: Toshio Nihonyanagi
- Jockey: Yukio Okabe; Kazuhiro Kato
- Record: 26: 4–4–2

Major wins
- Japanese Classic Race wins: Tokyo Yushun (1985)

Sirius Symboli (Japanese: シリウスシンボリ, Hepburn: Shiriusu Shinbori; 26 March 1982 – 8 April 2012) was a Japanese Thoroughbred racehorse and sire active during the late 1980s. Shortly before his victory at the Japanese Derby, he was chosen as a suitable candidate to compete in races in Europe; a rarity at the time for Japanese horses. Sirius Symboli competed mostly in France during his world campaign, including being the third Japanese entrant into the Prix de l'Arc de Triomphe. However, his performance was poor abroad, and he was unable to win a single race.

He returned to Japan in 1987, racing twice more but retiring after a leg fracture was found. He became a stud horse in 1989, retiring from duty in 1996. Sirius Symboli died at 30 years old from old age on 8 April 2012.

== Racing statistics ==
Sirius Symboli won 4 races out of 26 entries, 14 of which are international races. He placed 3 times in domestic races, and 3 times in international races This data is available based on ahonoora, netkeiba, JRA, Deutscher Galopp, and France Galop

Date	Racecourse	Race (Grade)	Distance (Condition)	Entry	HN	Odds (Favoured)	Finish	Time	Winning (Losing) (Margin)	Jockey	Winner (Runner Up)
1984 – two-year-old season
16 Sep	Nakayama	3yo Maiden	1600m (Yielding)	9	8	7.4 (2)	1st	1:37.1	1 1/4 lengths	Kazuhiro Kato	(Takano Minobu)
29 Sep	Nakayama	Fuyo Tokubetsu	1600m (Firm)	10	3	3.4 (1)	DSQ			Kazuhiro Kato	Bingo Timur
27 Oct	Tokyo	Icho Tokubetsu	1600m (Firm)	9	6	2.1 (1)	2nd	1:34.8	(nose)	Kazuhiro Kato	Road Quilter
18 Nov	Tokyo	Fuyu Sansai Stakes	1800m (Yielding)	7	4	1.6 (1)	1st	1:50.1	neck	Kazuhiro Kato	(Sakura Ichimonji)
1985 – three-year-old season
30 Mar	Nakayama	Wakaba Sho	2200m (Soft)	8	6	1.5 (1)	1st	2:16.2	2 lengths	Yukio Okabe	(Marron Couchette)
26 May	Tokyo	Tokyo Yushun (G1)	2400m (Soft)	26	16	5.5 (1)	1st	2:31.0	3 lengths	Kazuhiro Kato	(Suda Hawk)
27 Jul	Ascot	King George VI & Queen Elizabeth Stakes (G1)	1m 3f 211y (Firm)	12	13	100/1 (10)	8th	2:27.61 (Note: Time denotes Petoski's winning time.)	(23 lengths)	Yukio Okabe	Petoski
1 Sep	Baden-Baden	Grosser Preis von Baden (G1)	2400m (Heavy)	7	-	-	4th	2:37.80 (Note: Time denotes Gold and Ivory's winning time.)	(8 3/4 lengths)	Yukio Okabe	Gold and Ivory
15 Sep	Longchamp	Prix du Prince d'Orange (G3)	2000m (Good)	6	2	(5)	6th	-	(3 3/4 lengths)	Éric Legrix	Cariellor
15 Sep	Longchamp	Prix du Prince d'Orange (G3)	2000m (Good)	6	2	(5)	6th	-	(3 3/4 lengths)	Éric Legrix	Romildo
27 October	Longchamp	Prix Royal-Oak (G1)	3100m (Heavy)	12	7	(8)	3rd	3:22.70 (Note: Time denotes Mersey's winning time.)	(3 lengths)	Gérald Mossé	Mersey
1986 – four-year-old season
20 Apr	Longchamp	Prix d'Hédouville (G3)	2400m (Good)	6	6	(3)	5th	-	(10 lengths)	Gérald Mossé	Baby Turk
6 May	Saint-Cloud	Prix Sea Sick (OP)	2000m (Soft)	5	4	(1)	3rd	-	(2 1/2 lengths)	Éric Legrix	Tilt
8 June	San Siro	Gran Premio di Milano (G1) (Note: This race was formerly contested at Group 1 level before being downgraded in 2016 to Group 2, before being downgraded again in 2023 to Group 3.)	2400m (Soft)	9	-	-	5th	2:29.3 (Note: Time denotes Tommy Way's winning time.)	(6 lengths)	Gérald Mossé	Tommy Way
16 Aug	Deauville	Prix Gontaut-Biron (G3)	2000m (Good)	10	6	(7)	4th	-	(3 lengths)	Éric Legrix	Over the Ocean
14 Sep	Longchamp	Prix Foy (G3)	2400m (Soft)	6	1	(5)	2nd	2:38.7	(neck)	Maurice Philipperon	Mersey
6 Oct	Longchamp	Prix de L'arc de Triomphe (G1)	2400m (Good)	15	8	(9)	14th	2:27.7 (Note: Time denotes Dancing Brave's winning time.)	(14 1/2 lengths)	Maurice Philipperon	Dancing Brave
19 Oct	Longchamp	Prix du Conseil de Paris (G2)	2400m (Soft)	10	2	(3)	4th	2:35.10 (Note: Time denotes Altayan's winning time.)	(3 1/4 lengths)	Maurice Philipperon	Altayan
1987 – five-year-old season
28 Mar	Saint-Cloud	Prix Edmond Blanc (G3)	1600m (Heavy)	11	5	(6)	4th	1:53.70 (Note: Time denotes Highest Honor's winning time.)	(2 lengths)	Maurice Philipperon	Highest Honor
12 Apr	Longchamp	Prix d'Harcourt (G2)	2000m (Soft)	13	7	(12)	8th	2:08.10 (Note: Time denotes Grand Pavois's winning time.)	(4 lengths)	Maurice Philipperon	Grand Pavois
3 May	Longchamp	Prix Ganay (G1)	2100m (Good)	10	6	(7)	7th	2:15.10 (Note: Time denotes Triptych's winning time.)	(8 1/2 lengths)	Maurice Philipperon	Triptych
11 Oct	Tokyo	Mainichi Okan (G2)	1800m (Good)	12	1	6.0 (3)	8th	1:47.0	(5 1/4 lengths)	Kazuhiro Kato	Dyna Actress
1 Nov	Tokyo	Tennō Shō (Autumn)	2000m (Heavy)	14	5	7.5 (5)	9th	2:01.4	(9 1/4 lengths)	Kazuhiro Kato	Nippo Teio
1988 – six-year-old season
7 Aug	Hakodate	Seikan Tunnel Kaitsū Kinen (OP)	1800m (Firm)	8	3	4.9 (3)	2nd	1:46.3	(2 lengths)	Kazuhiro Kato	Bold Northman
21 Aug	Hakodate	Hakodate Kinen (G3)	2000m (Firm)	14	4	4.6 (2)	4th	1:59.0	(7 3/4 Lengths)	Kazuhiro Kato	Soccer Boy
9 Oct	Tokyo	Mainichi Okan (G2)	1800m (Good)	11	7	11.1 (4)	2nd	1:49.4	(1 1/4 lengths)	Kazuhiro Kato	Oguri Cap
30 Oct	Tokyo	Tennō Shō (Autumn) (G1)	2000m (Firm)	13	10	14.2 (5)	7th	2:00.3	(8 3/4 lengths)	Kazuhiro Kato	Tamamo Cross

== In popular culture ==
An anthropomorphized version of Sirius Symboli appears as a character in the Japanese multimedia franchise Umamusume: Pretty Derby, voiced by Fairouz Ai. She is characterized as a charismatic lone wolf of a racer with trust issues against authority figures, going as far as referring to the player trainer as a puppy. She is also a childhood friend of Symboli Rudolf, though a past experience has left her with resentment for the latter to the point that Sirius only sees a fierce rivalry between them. Kazuhiro Kato, Sirius Symboli's jockey has expressed praise on social media for her in-game depiction in Umamusume: Pretty Derby, thanking the developers for dedicating an in-game story to the real-life horse.

== Pedigree ==
Pedigree of Sirius Symboli
Sire Mogami 1976 br.	Lyphard; 1969 b.	Northern Dancer	Nearctic
Sire Mogami 1976 br.	Lyphard; 1969 b.	Northern Dancer	Natalma
Sire Mogami 1976 br.	Lyphard; 1969 b.	Goofed	Court Martial
Sire Mogami 1976 br.	Lyphard; 1969 b.	Goofed	Barra
Sire Mogami 1976 br.	No Luck; 1968 dk. b.	Lucky Debonair	Vertex
Sire Mogami 1976 br.	No Luck; 1968 dk. b.	Lucky Debonair	Fresh as Fresh
Sire Mogami 1976 br.	No Luck; 1968 dk. b.	No Teasing	Palestinian
Sire Mogami 1976 br.	No Luck; 1968 dk. b.	No Teasing	No Fiddling
Dam Sweet Epsom 1976 b.	Partholon; 1960 b.	Milesian	My Babu
Dam Sweet Epsom 1976 b.	Partholon; 1960 b.	Milesian	Oatflake
Dam Sweet Epsom 1976 b.	Partholon; 1960 b.	Paleo	Pharis
Dam Sweet Epsom 1976 b.	Partholon; 1960 b.	Paleo	Calonice
Dam Sweet Epsom 1976 b.	Shiretoko; 1970 ch.	Takawalk	Native Dancer
Dam Sweet Epsom 1976 b.	Shiretoko; 1970 ch.	Takawalk	Ampola
Dam Sweet Epsom 1976 b.	Shiretoko; 1970 ch.	Pochette	Worden
Dam Sweet Epsom 1976 b.	Shiretoko; 1970 ch.	Pochette	Diplomatic Bag
