= Fair Salinia =

Irish-bred Thoroughbred racehorse

- Racing silks of Sven Hanson
- Sire: Petingo
- Grandsire: Petition
- Dam: Fair Arabella
- Damsire: Chateaugay
- Sex: Mare
- Foaled: 18 March 1975
- Country: United Kingdom
- Colour: Bay
- Breeder: Oldtown Stud
- Owner: Sven Hanson
- Trainer: Michael Stoute
- Record: 8:4-2-0

Major wins
- Oaks Stakes (1978); Irish Oaks (1978); Yorkshire Oaks (1978)

Awards
- Timeform rating 114 (1977), 125 (1978)

Fair Salinia (18 March 1975 – 31 March 2004) was a British Thoroughbred racehorse and broodmare best known for winning the classic Oaks Stakes in 1978. In a racing career which lasted from September 1977 until September 1978 she won four of her eight races. As a two-year-old in 1977 she won on her debut before finishing second in the Cheveley Park Stakes. As a three-year-old she finished second in the 1000 Guineas before being moved up in distance and winning the Oaks, Irish Oaks and Yorkshire Oaks. She was retired to stud at the end of the season and had some influence as a broodmare. She died in 2004 at the age of twenty-nine.

== Background ==
Fair Salinia was a bay mare with a small white star and white socks on her hind legs bred in Ireland by Major John de Brugh's Oldtown Stud. She was sired by Petingo, the leading English two-year-old of 1967 when he was rated the best horse in Europe by the independent Timeform organisation. His other progeny included the 1979 Derby winner Troy. Fair Salinia's dam, Fair Arabella was an American-bred mare who was a half-sister to the Prix du Moulin winner Faraway Son and the Prix d'Harcourt winner Liloy. As a descendant of the broodmare Judy O'Grady, Fair Arabella came from the same branch of Thoroughbred family 16-c which also produced Green Dancer, Solemia, Authorized, Dream Well and Makfi.

As a yearling, Fair Salinia was offered for sale and bought by Sven Hanson for 13,000 guineas. Hanson later explained had not intended to spend more than 7,000 guineas and was looking to buy only colts, but decided to bid for the filly as she was "the spitting image of Liloy". The filly, who was named in honour of the Hanson family's interests in the salt business, was sent into training with Michael Stoute at Newmarket, Suffolk.

== Racing career ==
=== 1977: two-year-old season ===
Fair Salinia made her racecourse debut in early September 1977 when she contested the Gancia Stakes over seven furlongs at Sandown Park Racecourse for which started a 20/1 outsider. The race was open to both colts and fillies but was restricted to horses that had not run before 3 August. Fair Salinia took the lead on the turn into the straight, went clear of the field approaching the final furlong and won by two lengths from the colt Tom Noel. At the end of the month the filly was moved up sharply in class for the Group One Cheveley Park Stakes over six furlongs at Newmarket Racecourse. She appeared outpaced for most of the race but stayed on strongly in the closing stages to finish third behind Sookera and Petty Purse. Following inquiry by the racecourse stewards she was promoted to second after Petty Purse was disqualified for causing interference.

=== 1978: three-year-old season ===
Fair Salinia ran disappointingly on her three-year-old debut, finishing fourth behind Shapina in the Fred Darling Stakes. She then contested the classic 1000 Guineas over the Rowley Mile course at Newmarket in which she produced a much better performance, finishing strongly to take second place in a field of sixteen fillies, a length behind Enstone Spark.

A month later, Fair Salinia was moved up in distance for the 200th running of the Oaks Stakes over one and a half miles at Epsom Downs Racecourse. Some observers doubted that she would stay the distance, as most of her family had excelled as milers. Ridden by Greville Starkey, she started at odds of 8/1 in a field of fifteen fillies, with the French-trained Dancing Maid starting favourite after having won the Poule d'Essai des Pouliches. Fair Salinia had a good position throughout the race and tracked Dancing Maid when the French filly went to the front a quarter of a mile from the finish. Under a strong ride from Starkey, Fair Salinia moved alongside the favourite and went gained the advantage in the final stride to win by a short head. Stoute was winning the race for the first time, whilst Starkey completed a notable double, having won the Derby on Shirley Heights three days earlier.

At the Curragh Racecourse on 15 July, Fair Salinia started 3/1 favourite for the Irish Oaks. She turned into the straight in fifth place and made steady headway to move into second place behind the John Oxx-trained filly Sorbus a furlong from the finish. She could make no further progress, however, and finished second, beaten a length by Sorbus who had hung to the left in the closing stages, with the Ribblesdale Stakes winner Relfo close behind in third place. Following an objection by Starkey and an inquiry by the local stewards Sorbus was disqualified for causing interference to the runner-up in the final furlong and the race was awarded to Fair Salinia. Timeform felt that Fair Salinia was lucky to be awarded the race, whilst Oxx, who lodged an unsuccessful appeal against the verdict later referred to "that infamous day".

Fair Salina and Sorbus met again in the Yorkshire Oaks at York Racecourse in August. Relfo started favourite at odds of 7/4 ahead of Sorbus (4/1) with Fair Salinia third choice in the betting on 5/1. In a change of tactics, Starkey sent the filly into the lead six furlongs from the finish and sent her clear of the field early in the straight. She appeared to be tiring in the closing stages but held on to win by one and a half lengths from Sorbus, with Be Sweet in third. In the following month, Fair Salinia was sent to France to contest the Prix Vermeille over 2400 metres at Longchamp Racecourse on 17 September in which she was opposed by Dancing Maid and Relfo. Starting at odds of 13/1 she led from the start and set a very strong pace but was overtaken in the straight and finished fifth, three and a half lengths behind the winner Dancing Maid.

== Assessment ==
As a two-year-old, Fair Salinia was given a rating of 114 by Timeform, eleven pounds below their top-rated two-year-old filly Cherry Hinton. In the Free Handicap, a rating of the best two-year-olds to race in Britain, she was allotted a weight of 120 pounds, seven pounds behind Cherry Hinton, making her the fourth highest-rated filly of her generation. In the following year, she was given a rating of 125 by Timeform, four pounds behind their top-rated three-year-old filly Swiss Maid. She was rated eleven pounds behind the same filly in the official International Classification.

In their book, A Century of Champions, based on the Timeform rating system, John Randall and Tony Morris rated Fair Salinia an "average" winner of the Oaks.

== Breeding record ==
Fair Salinia was retired from racing to become a broodmare at her owners stud. She produced at least eleven foals and six winners.

- Warren Hill (bay colt, foaled in 1980, sired by Nonoalco)
- Fair Habit (bay filly, 1981, by Habitat), failed to win in three races
- Legend of Arabia (bay filly, 1983, by Great Nephew), unraced, dam of Nomadic (Morgiana Hurdle)
- Horn Dance (bay colt, 1986, by Green Dancer), won one race
- Impact (brown colt, 1988, by Green Desert), won one race
- Perfect Circle (brown filly, 1989, by Caerleon), won two races including the Sceptre Stakes
- Perfect Vintage (bay gelding, 1990, by Shirley Heights), won four races including the Prix Quincey
- Crespo (bay colt, 1992, by Kris), won one race
- On Fair Stage (bay filly, 1993, by Sadler's Wells), won two races, dam of French Opera (Game Spirit Chase, Celebration Chase), and Reliable Man (Prix du Jockey Club)
- Rivelino (bay filly, 1995, by Caerleon), failed to win in four races
- Tall Order (bay colt, 1998, by Caerleon), failed to win in two races

On the morning of 31 March 2004, Fair Salinia was unable to get to her feet in her stable at Hanson's Haras de Vieux Pont. Her condition did not improve and she was euthanized that evening.

== Pedigree ==
Pedigree of Fair Salinia (IRE), bay mare, 1975
Sire Petingo (GB) 1965	Petition (GB); 1944	Fair Trial	Fairway
Sire Petingo (GB) 1965	Petition (GB); 1944	Fair Trial	Lady Juror
Sire Petingo (GB) 1965	Petition (GB); 1944	Art Paper	Artists Proof
Sire Petingo (GB) 1965	Petition (GB); 1944	Art Paper	Quire
Sire Petingo (GB) 1965	Alcazar (FR); 1957	Alycidon	Donatello
Sire Petingo (GB) 1965	Alcazar (FR); 1957	Alycidon	Aurora
Sire Petingo (GB) 1965	Alcazar (FR); 1957	Quarterdeck	Nearco
Sire Petingo (GB) 1965	Alcazar (FR); 1957	Quarterdeck	Poker Chip
Dam Fair Arabella (USA) 1968	Chateaugay (USA); 1960	Swaps	Khaled
Dam Fair Arabella (USA) 1968	Chateaugay (USA); 1960	Swaps	Iron Reward
Dam Fair Arabella (USA) 1968	Chateaugay (USA); 1960	Banquet Bell	Polynesian
Dam Fair Arabella (USA) 1968	Chateaugay (USA); 1960	Banquet Bell	Dinner Horn
Dam Fair Arabella (USA) 1968	Locust Time (USA); 1955	Spy Song	Balladier
Dam Fair Arabella (USA) 1968	Locust Time (USA); 1955	Spy Song	Mata Hari
Dam Fair Arabella (USA) 1968	Locust Time (USA); 1955	Snow Goose	Mahmoud
Dam Fair Arabella (USA) 1968	Locust Time (USA); 1955	Snow Goose	Judy O'Grady (Family: 16-c)
