= Petoski =

British-bred Thoroughbred racehorse

- Sire: Niniski
- Grandsire: Nijinsky
- Dam: Sushila
- Damsire: Petingo
- Sex: Stallion
- Foaled: 24 February 1982
- Country: United Kingdom
- Colour: Bay
- Breeder: Kirsten Rausing
- Owner: Lady Beaverbrook
- Trainer: Dick Hern
- Record: 12:4–2–2

Major wins
- Vintage Stakes (1984); Princess of Wales's Stakes (1985); King George VI and Queen Elizabeth Stakes (1985)

Awards
- Timeform rating: 135
- Last updated on 16 June 2022

Petoski (24 February 1982–2003) was a British Thoroughbred racehorse. In a racing career that lasted from June 1984 to July 1986, he ran twelve times and won four races. Petoski is most notable for his win against a strong international field in the 1985 King George VI and Queen Elizabeth Stakes.

== Background ==
Petoski was a big, powerful, rangy bay horse with a narrow white blaze and white socks on his hind feet who was bred by Kirsten Rausing, the owner of the Lanwades Stud. He was sired by the Irish St. Leger and Prix Royal Oak winner Niniski out of the mare Sushila. Petoski was sent to the Newmarket sales as a yearling where he was bought for 90,000 guineas by the representatives of the British Bloodstock Agency. He subsequently entered into the ownership of Lady Beaverbrook and was sent into training with Major Dick Hern at West Ilsley in Berkshire.

Lady Beaverbrook was considered an eccentric character who gave most of her horses names consisting of one word with seven letters (Bustino, Terimon, Boldboy, Niniski, Mystiko) as this was the most common form for Derby winners' names.

== Racing career ==
=== 1984: two-year-old season ===
Petoski began his racing career in the six furlong Champagne Stakes at Salisbury and won by half a length from Tom Boat. In August he was sent to Goodwood for the Group Three Lanson Champagne Stakes and won by three quarters of a length from the British Horse of the Year Provideo. Petoski then started favourite for the Champagne Stakes at Doncaster but finished third to Young Runaway, having been unable to obtain a clear run at a crucial stage of the race. On his final start of the season, Petoski was made favourite for the Royal Lodge Stakes at Ascot in October, but finished unplaced. At the end of the year he was given a rating of 107 by Timeform who noted that he was likely to perform better at longer distances and seemed to be suited by firm ground.

=== 1985: three-year-old season ===
In early 1985, Petoski was prepared for a run in The Derby by running in two recognised trial races. In May he finished second by a length to Damister in the Sandown Classic Trial, and two weeks later he ran second to Law Society in the Chester Vase. Following these performances he was sent off at odds of 33/1 in the Derby and finished eleventh of the thirteen runners behind Slip Anchor. Petoski appeared to be a useful racehorse who was unable to compete at the highest class.

In July, Petoski appeared at Newmarket to contest the Group Two Princess of Wales's Stakes. Ridden as usual by Willie Carson he produced easily his best performance to date to win by two lengths from a field which included Jupiter Island (Japan Cup) and Lanfranco (King Edward VII Stakes). The way in which he "stormed home" in the race led some commentators to question the validity of the Epsom Derby form. Later in the same month, Petoski was sent to Ascot for the King George VI and Queen Elizabeth Stakes in which he faced a field which included Oh So Sharp and Rainbow Quest from England, Law Society and Princess Pati from Ireland, Treizieme from France, Sirius Symboli from Japan and Strawberry Road from Australia. Petoski was held up towards the rear of the field before moving into contention in the straight. Switched to the outside, he produced a strong late run to take the lead in the final strides and win by a neck from Oh So Sharp with Rainbow Quest in third. The winning time was the fastest since Grundy's win in 1975 and remained the second fastest for the race until the victory of Harbinger in 2010. Following the race, Dick Hern, who had used a wheelchair following a hunting accident when riding with the Quorn in December 1984, received a personal telephone message from the Queen congratulating him on Petoski's victory. Petoski was being prepared for a run in the Great Voltigeur Stakes in August when he sustained a pastern injury that ruled him out for the rest of the season.

At the end of the year, Petoski was given a Timeform rating of 135.

=== 1986: four-year-old season ===
Petoski stayed in training as a four-year-old but failed to win in three starts, finishing third in the Coronation Cup and the Princess of Wales's Stakes. He finished unplaced behind Dancing Brave in the King George VI and Queen Elizabeth Stakes on his final appearance.

== Stud career ==
Petoski was not a success as a stallion. He sired fewer than a hundred flat race winners, the best probably being the Preis der Diana winner Night Petticoat. He had slightly more success as a sire of jumpers and show horses, with one of his offspring, the Queen's horse Petition, winning a major prize at the Royal Windsor Horse Show. He stood for several years at the British National Stud and was later based at the Conduit Farm in Oxfordshire. His last foals were conceived in 2003.

== Pedigree ==
Pedigree of Petoski (GB), bay stallion, 1982
Sire Niniski (USA) 1976	Nijinsky (CAN); 1967	Northern Dancer	Nearctic
Sire Niniski (USA) 1976	Nijinsky (CAN); 1967	Northern Dancer	Natalma
Sire Niniski (USA) 1976	Nijinsky (CAN); 1967	Flaming Page	Bull Page
Sire Niniski (USA) 1976	Nijinsky (CAN); 1967	Flaming Page	Flaring Top
Sire Niniski (USA) 1976	Virginia Hills (USA); 1971	Tom Rolfe	Ribot
Sire Niniski (USA) 1976	Virginia Hills (USA); 1971	Tom Rolfe	Pocahontas
Sire Niniski (USA) 1976	Virginia Hills (USA); 1971	Ridin' Easy	Ridan
Sire Niniski (USA) 1976	Virginia Hills (USA); 1971	Ridin' Easy	Easy Eight
Dam Sushila (IRE) 1975	Petingo (GB); 1965	Petition	Fair Trial
Dam Sushila (IRE) 1975	Petingo (GB); 1965	Petition	Art Paper
Dam Sushila (IRE) 1975	Petingo (GB); 1965	Alcazar	Alycidon
Dam Sushila (IRE) 1975	Petingo (GB); 1965	Alcazar	Quarterdeck
Dam Sushila (IRE) 1975	Shenandoah (FRA); 1965	Vieux Manoir	Brantôme
Dam Sushila (IRE) 1975	Shenandoah (FRA); 1965	Vieux Manoir	Vieille Maison
Dam Sushila (IRE) 1975	Shenandoah (FRA); 1965	Vali	Sunny Boy
Dam Sushila (IRE) 1975	Shenandoah (FRA); 1965	Vali	Her Slipper (Family:5-h)
