= UAE 2000 Guineas =

- Class: Group Three
- Location: Meydan Racecourse; Dubai, United Arab Emirates
- Inaugurated: 2000
- Race type: Thoroughbred - Flat racing

Race information
- Distance: 1,600 metres
- Surface: Dirt
- Track: Left-handed
- Qualification: 3yo
- Purse: $250,000

The UAE 2000 Guineas, is a horse race run over a distance of 1,600 metres (one mile) on dirt in February at Meydan Racecourse in Dubai. The race is restricted to three-year-olds.

It was first contested in 2000 on dirt at Nad Al Sheba Racecourse. It was transferred to Meydan in 2010 where it was run on the synthetic Tapeta Footings surface. In 2015 the synthetic surface at Meydan was replaced by a dirt track.

The UAE 2000 Guineas began as an ungraded race before being promoted to Group 3 level in 2002.

In 2026 the event became a qualification event for the Euro/Mideast Road to the Kentucky Derby.

== Records ==
Record time:

- 1:34.80 - Bachir 2000, Honour Devil 2008

Most wins by a jockey:

- 4 - Mickael Barzalona 2011, 2012, 2014, 2026

Most wins by a trainer:

- 7 - Saeed bin Suroor 2000, 2001, 2002, 2009, 2015, 2017, 2019

Most wins by an owner:

- 11 - Godolphin Racing 2000, 2001, 2002, 2004, 2009, 2012, 2014, 2015, 2017, 2018, 2019

== Winners ==
Year	Winner	Jockey	Trainer	Owner	Time
2000	Bachir	Sylvain Guillot	Saeed bin Suroor	Godolphin	1:34.80
2001	Street Cry	Frankie Dettori	Saeed bin Suroor	Godolphin	1:35:14
2002	Essence of Dubai	Frankie Dettori	Saeed bin Suroor	Godolphin	1:36.60
2003	Victory Moon	Wayne Smith	Mike de Kock	Madcap Syndicate	1:37.40
2004	Little Jim	Ted Durcan	Satish Seemar	Rashid Bin Mohammed	1:37.63
2005	Stagelight	Eddie Ahern	Jeremy Noseda	Fieldspring Racing	1:40:42
2006	Gold For Sale	Mick Kinane	Ian Jory	Sultan Mohammed Saud Al Kabeer	1:37.56
2007	Asiatic Boy	Johnny Murtagh	Mike de Kock	Mohammed bin Khalifa Al Maktoum	1:36.25
2008	Honour Devil	Johnny Murtagh	Mike de Kock	Mohammed bin Khalifa Al Maktoum	1:34.80
2009	Desert Party	Frankie Dettori	Saeed bin Suroor	Godolphin	1:37.63
2010	Musir	Christophe Soumillon	Mike de Kock	Mohammed bin Khalifa Al Maktoum	1:37.46
2011	Splash Point	Mickael Barzalona	Mahmood Al Zarooni	Hamdan bin Mohammed Al Maktoum	1:37.73
2012	Kinglet	Mickael Barzalona	Mahmood Al Zarooni	Godolphin	1:37.72
2013	Soft Falling Rain	Paul Hanagan	Mike de Kock	Hamdan Al Maktoum	1:36.70
2014	Long John	Mickael Barzalona	Charlie Appleby	Godolphin	1:36.23
2015	Maftool	Paul Hanagan	Saeed bin Suroor	Godolphin	1:37.69
2016	Market Rally	Chris Hayes	Dhruba Selvaratnam	Ahmed Al Maktoum	1:38.08
2017	Thunder Snow	Christophe Soumillon	Saeed bin Suroor	Godolphin	1:38.48
2018	Gold Town	William Buick	Charlie Appleby	Godolphin	1:37.77
2019	Estihdaaf	Christophe Soumillon	Saeed bin Suroor	Godolphin	1:39.87
2020	Fore Left	William Buick	Doug O'Neill	Reddam Racing	1:38.43
2021	Mouheeb	Ryan Curatolo	Nicholas Bachalard	Ahmed Al Maktoum	1:36.46
2022	Azure Coast	Antonio Fresu	Pavel Vashchenko	Vladimir Kazakov	1:39.21
2023	Tall Boy	William Buick	Doug O'Neill	Calumet Farm	1:37.32
2024	Mendelssohn Bay	Patrick Cosgrove	Bhupat Seemar	Suited & Booted Racing Syndicate	1:38.13
2025	Golden Vekoma	Connor Beasley	A bin Harmash	Mohammed Al Suboosi	1:37.08
2026	Six Speed	Mickael Barzalona	Bhupat Seemar	Brunetti Dugan Stables and Black Type Thoroughbreds et al	1:38.02

== See also ==
- List of United Arab Emirates horse races
