= Dai Turgeon =

Canadian actress

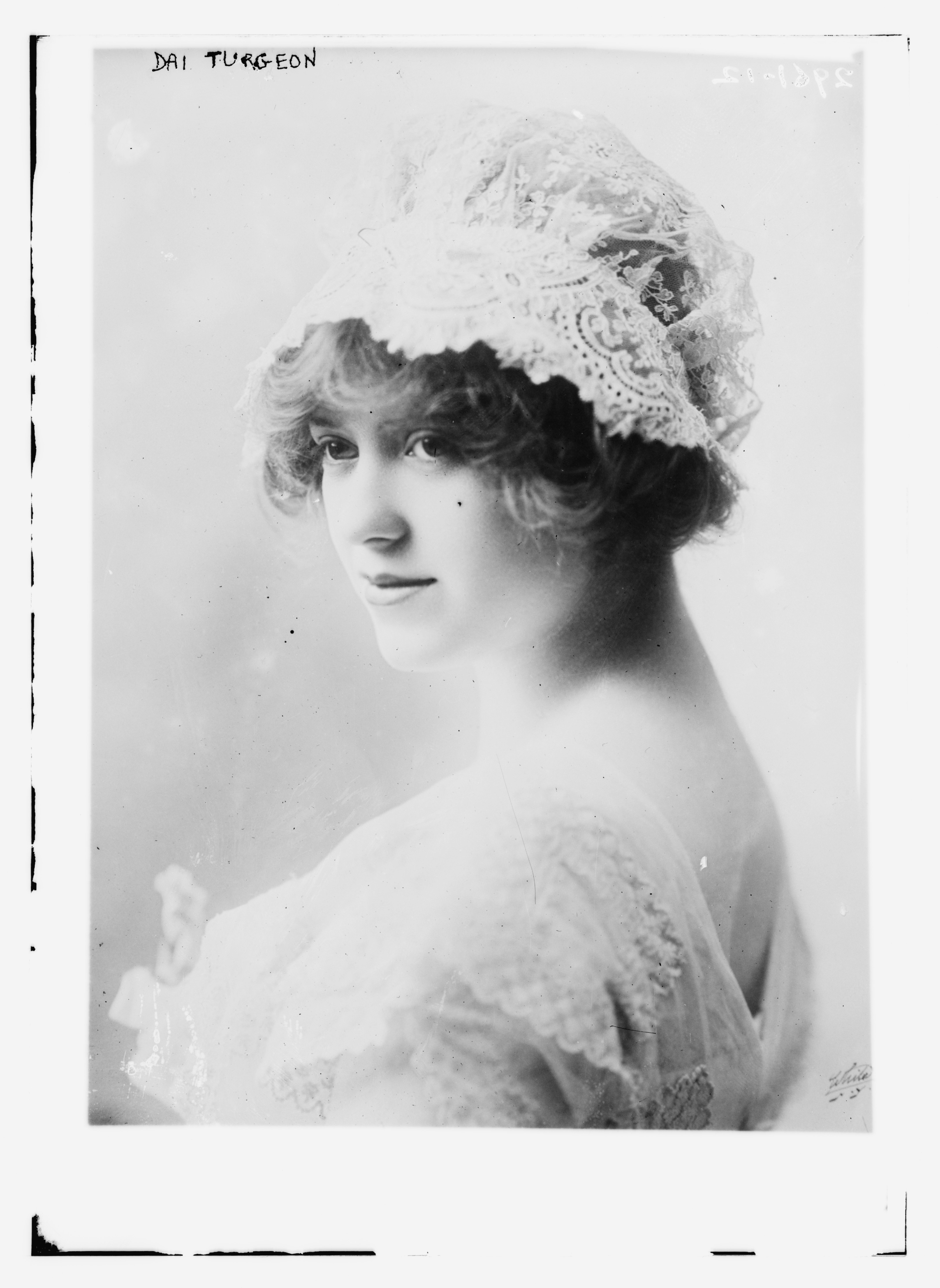
- Dai Turgeon
- Born: Pauline Dai Turgeon; October 9, 1890; Ottawa, Ontario, Canada
- Occupation: Stage actress
- Spouse: Charles Belmont Davis (m. 1914; div. 1921)
- Parents: Charles Edward Turgeon (father); Maud Higginson (mother)

Pauline Dai Turgeon (October 9, 1890 – date of death unknown) was a Canadian stage actress.

== Biography ==
She was born on October 9, 1890, in Ottawa, Ontario, Canada to Charles Edward Turgeon and Maud Higginson divorced Charles Belmont Davis after seven years of marriage (he died in 1926).

She married Charles Belmont Davis (1866-1926), the brother of Richard Harding Davis, in London in January 1914; she was 24, he was 48. They divorced in 1921.

== Productions ==
- The Girl from Montmartre (1912)
- Over the River (1912)
