= Circus Ring =

British-bred Thoroughbred racehorse

- Sire: High Top
- Grandsire: Derring-Do
- Dam: Bell Song
- Damsire: Tudor Melody
- Sex: Mare
- Foaled: 8 February 1979
- Country: United Kingdom
- Colour: Bay
- Breeder: Snailwell Stud
- Owner: Snailwell Stud
- Trainer: Michael Stoute
- Record: 4: 3-0-0

Major wins
- Princess Margaret Stakes (1981); Lowther Stakes (1981)

Awards
- Top-rated European two-year-old filly (1981); Timeform top-rated two-year-old filly (1981); Timeform rating 122 (1981)

Circus Ring (8 February 1979–25 November 2009) was a British Thoroughbred racehorse and broodmare. Despite never contesting a Group One race she was the leading two-year-old filly in the United Kingdom in 1981 when she was unbeaten in three races including the Princess Margaret Stakes (by ten lengths) and the Lowther Stakes. She then developed injury problems and finished unplaced in her only appearance in 1982. Circus Ring later became a successful broodmare and was the direct female-line ancestor of the Hong Kong Horse of the Year Viva Pataca. She died in 2009 at the age of 30.

== Background ==
Circus Ring was a dark-coated bay filly with no white markings, bred and owned by the Snailwell Stud of Newmarket, Suffolk. She was sired by High Top, who won the 2000 Guineas in 1972 and later became a successful breeding stallion. His other progeny included the St Leger Stakes winner Cut Above, the Oaks winner Circus Plume and the Prix du Jockey Club winner Top Ville. Circus Ring's dam Bell Song was a great-granddaughter of the 1000 Guineas winner Campanula, whose other descendants have included Athens Wood, Tony Bin, Dibidale (Irish Oaks), Vitiges (Champion Stakes) and Bolkonski.

The filly was sent into training with Michael Stoute at his Freemason Lodge Stables in Newmarket and was ridden in all of her races by Walter Swinburn.

== Racing career ==
=== 1981: two-year-old season ===
On her racecourse debut, Circus Ring contested a division on the Princess Maiden Stakes over six furlongs at Newmarket Racecourse in July. She was always among the leaders and accelerated clear of the field in the last quarter mile to win easily by seven lengths from Wintergrace. Later in the month, the filly was moved up in class for the Group Three Princess Margaret Stakes over six furlongs at Ascot Racecourse. She started the 4/6 favourite against a field which included several highly regarded fillies including Fairy Tern, Atossa and Silojoka. She produced what Timeform described as "one of the most breathtaking displays by a two-year-old filly that we have seen in a long time", taking the lead approaching the final furlong and sprinting clear of the field to win by ten lengths. At York Racecourse on 19 August, Circus Ring started the 1/4 favourite for the Group Two Lowther Stakes, in which her rivals were headed by the Cherry Hinton Stakes winner Travel On. Circus Ring traveled very easily throughout the race and Swinburn spent the closing stages looking round for non-existent dangers. Her winning margin of two lengths from Travel On was described by Timeform as being an inadequate measure of her superiority over her opponents. Circus Ring was being prepared for a run in the Group One Cheveley Park Stakes when she fell lame in mid-September and was retired for the season.

=== 1982: three-year-old season ===
Circus Ring began the 1982 season as the clear favourite for the 1000 Guineas, despite doubts about her stamina and ability to recover from her injury of the previous season. Two weeks before the Newmarket classic she performed poorly in a training gallop and was withdrawn from the race. She eventually reappeared for the Coronation Stakes at Royal Ascot in June. She looked fit and well and ran well for much of the race but faded badly in the closing stages and finished last of the eight runners behind Chalon.

== Assessment ==
In 1981, the independent Timeform organisation gave Circus Ring a rating of 122, making her the highest-rated two-year-old filly of the season. The experienced racing journalist Peter Willett compared Circus Ring's performances to those of Mumtaz Mahal and Myrobella. In the official International Classification she was rated the joint-best two-year-old filly in Europe, equal with the Fillies' Mile winner Height of Fashion and the French-trained Play It Safe.

== Stud record ==
Circus Ring was retired from racing to become a broodmare at the Snailwell Stud before being exported to Australia in the mid 1990s by the Coolmore Stud. She produced no known foals after 1999 and died on 25 November 2009.

Circus Ring's foals:

- Douglas Fir (bay colt, foaled in 1984, sired by Busted)
- Circus Act (bay filly, 1985, by Shirley Heights), dam of Brave Act (Solario Stakes, San Gabriel Handicap, Citation Handicap, Will Rogers Stakes, San Marcos Handicap), Comic, the dam of Viva Pataca and Laughing (Flower Bowl Invitational Stakes)
- Lady Shipley (bay filly, 1986, by Shirley Heights), won Lupe Stakes
- Rainbow Ring (bay filly, 1987, by Rainbow Quest)
- Royal Circus (bay colt, 1989, by Kris), won fifteen races
- Finger of Light (bay filly, 1991, by Green Desert), won one race, grand-dam of Voila Ici (Premio Roma, Gran Premio di Milano)
- Ellie Ardensky (bay filly, 1992, by Slip Anchor), won two races including the Listed Upavon Stakes
- Cohiba (bay colt, 1993, by Old Vic), won three races
- Slip The Net (bay colt, 1994, by Slip Anchor)
- Rose of Tralee (bay filly, 1995, by Sadler's Wells), dam of Serenade Rose (VRC Oaks, AJC Oaks) and female-line ancestor of Trekking.
- Florilegio (bay filly, 1996, by Danehill)
- Danemarque (bay filly, 1997, by Danehill)
- Wild Berries (bay filly, 1999, by Danehill)

== Pedigree ==
Pedigree of Circus Ring (IRE), bay mare, 1979
Sire High Top (IRE) 1969	Derring-Do (GB); 1961	Darius	Dante
Sire High Top (IRE) 1969	Derring-Do (GB); 1961	Darius	Yasna
Sire High Top (IRE) 1969	Derring-Do (GB); 1961	Sipsey Bridge	Abernant
Sire High Top (IRE) 1969	Derring-Do (GB); 1961	Sipsey Bridge	Claudette
Sire High Top (IRE) 1969	Camenae (GB); 1961	Vimy	Wild Risk
Sire High Top (IRE) 1969	Camenae (GB); 1961	Vimy	Mimi
Sire High Top (IRE) 1969	Camenae (GB); 1961	Madrilene	Court Martial
Sire High Top (IRE) 1969	Camenae (GB); 1961	Madrilene	Marmite
Dam Bell Song (GB) 1966	Tudor Melody (GB); 1956	Tudor Minstrel	Owen Tudor
Dam Bell Song (GB) 1966	Tudor Melody (GB); 1956	Tudor Minstrel	Sansonnet
Dam Bell Song (GB) 1966	Tudor Melody (GB); 1956	Matelda	Dante
Dam Bell Song (GB) 1966	Tudor Melody (GB); 1956	Matelda	Fairly Hot
Dam Bell Song (GB) 1966	Campanette (GB); 1948	Fair Trial	Fairway
Dam Bell Song (GB) 1966	Campanette (GB); 1948	Fair Trial	Lady Juror
Dam Bell Song (GB) 1966	Campanette (GB); 1948	Calluna	Hyperion
Dam Bell Song (GB) 1966	Campanette (GB); 1948	Calluna	Campanula (Family: 19-b)

- Circus Ring was inbred 4 x 4 to Dante, meaning that this stallion appears twice in the fourth generation of the pedigree.
