= Petingo =

British-bred Thoroughbred racehorse

- Sire: Petition
- Grandsire: Fair Trial
- Dam: Alcazar
- Damsire: Alycidon
- Sex: Stallion
- Foaled: 1965
- Died: 1976 (aged 10–11)
- Country: United Kingdom
- Colour: Bay
- Breeder: Pinfold Stud (Nicholas Hall)
- Owner: Marcos Lemos
- Trainer: Frederick Lakin "Sam" Armstrong
- Record: 9:6-2-0
- Earnings: £40,480

Major wins
- Gimcrack Stakes (1967); Middle Park Stakes (1967); Craven Stakes (1968); St. James's Palace Stakes (1968); Sussex Stakes (1968)

Awards
- Top-rated British two-year-old (1967); Timeform Top-rated horse (1967); Timeform rating 135; Leading sire in Great Britain and Ireland (1979)

Petingo (1965–1976) was a British Thoroughbred racehorse and sire. In a racing career which lasted from June 1967 until August 1968 he ran nine times and won six races. In 1967 he was unbeaten in three starts including the Gimcrack Stakes and the Middle Park Stakes and was officially rated the best two-year-old in Britain. In the following year he was defeated by Sir Ivor in the 2000 Guineas but won the St. James's Palace Stakes and the Sussex Stakes. He was then retired to stud where he proved to be a very successful stallion before his death at the age of eleven.

== Background ==
Petingo was a big, powerfully-built bay horse with a white blaze and white socks on his hind legs. He was bred by Nicholas Hall's Pinfold Stud at Marthall, near Knutsford in Cheshire. He was sired by Petition, whose wins included the Eclipse Stakes and who was best known at stud for getting the outstanding filly Petite Étoile. His dam, Alcazar was a French-bred daughter of the Ascot Gold Cup winner Alycidon and won one minor race at Newmarket Racecourse. As a descendant of the broodmare Straight Sequence, she came from the same branch of Thoroughbred family 22 which produced Queenpot (1000 Guineas), Northjet (Prix Jacques Le Marois, Prix du Moulin) and Flying Paster.

As a yearling Petingo was bought for 7,800 guineas by the veteran trainer Frederick Lakin "Sam" Armstrong, who had enjoyed his greatest success in the late 1940s with the classic winners My Babu and Sayajirao. Armstrong was acting on behalf of the Greek shipping company director Captain Marcos D. Lemos in whose royal blue and white colours the colt raced. The colt was trained by Armstrong at his St Gatien stables in Newmarket, Suffolk.

== Racing career ==
=== 1967: two-year-old season ===
Petingo made his first racecourse appearance at Newmarket in June. In the Felix Leach Stakes he faced twenty other two-year-olds and won impressively by five lengths. After a break of two months he returned at York Racecourse in August when he was moved up in class to contest the Gimcrack Stakes (now a Group Two race). Ridden by Lester Piggott, Sam Armstrong's son-in-law, he was made the 7/4 favourite and won very easily by six lengths from Cheb's Lad. The form of the race was boosted when the runner-up won the Champagne Stakes at Doncaster Racecourse in September. Only two horses appeared to oppose Petingo when he made his third and final appearance of the season in the Middle Park Stakes (now Group One) at Newmarket in October. With Piggott again riding, he won at odds of 1/4. In the Free Handicap, a rating of the best British and Irish two-year-olds, Petingo was assigned top weight of 133 pounds, one pound ahead of Vaguely Noble.

=== 1968: three-year-old season ===
Despite being offered the ride on Petingo, Piggott elected to ride the Irish-trained Sir Ivor in the 2000 Guineas. When Petingo appeared for the first time as a three-year-old he was ridden by Joe Mercer in the Craven Stakes (now Group Three) at Newmarket in April. He started at odds of 2/5 and won in "breathtaking" style by four lengths to take his unbeaten run to four. The 2000 Guineas over the same course and distance two weeks later saw Petingo made the 9/4 second choice in the betting behind Sir Ivor, who started the 11/8 favourite. Petingo and Joe Mercer moved past the front-running So Blessed to take the lead two furlongs from the finish but was overtaken by Sir Ivor in the closing stages. He finished second, beaten one and a half lengths with Jimmy Reppin taking third place. On his next appearance, Petingo was sent to France for the Prix Lupin over 2000 metres at Longchamp Racecourse. Racing beyond a mile for the first and only time he finished unplaced behind Luthier.

In June Petingo returned to England for the St James's Palace Stakes (now Group One) over one mile at Ascot Racecourse. Reunited with Piggott, he started the 10/11 favourite and won from Atopolis and Berber. A month later Petingo was sent to Goodwood Racecourse for the Sussex Stakes (now Group One), which at that time was restricted to three and four-year-olds. He led from the start and won by four lengths in what the Bloodstock Breeders' Annual Review described as "a majestic canter" at odds of 6/4 from World Cup, a colt who had won the Jersey Stakes at Ascot and went on to win the Queen Elizabeth II Stakes in autumn. His winning time equaled the Goodwood course record. Petingo's last race was the Wills Mile (now Group Two), run in August over the same course and distance as the Sussex Stakes. He finished second when attempting to concede six pounds to Jimmy Reppin. Piggott reported that Petingo "was never going at any stage" and the colt was subjected to a post-race drug test. At this time it was announced that Lemos had sold a 90% stake in the horse to the Irish breeder Tim Rogers and would retire to stud at the end of the season.

== Assessment ==
Petingo was officially rated the best two-year-old in Britain in 1967 in a strong year. The independent Timeform organisation were even more impressed with the colt, giving him a rating of 135 which made him not only the season's best two-year-old, but the best horse of any age to race in Europe in 1967.

In their book A Century of Champions, based on a modified version of the Timeform system, John Randall and Tony Morris rated Petingo the nineteenth best British or Irish two-year-old of the 20th Century.

== Stud career ==
Petingo had a successful but brief stud career in Ireland, completing seven full seasons as a breeding stallion before his death from a heart attack at the Simmonstown Stud, Celbridge, County Kildare in February 1976. His best winners included Satingo (Grand Critérium), Miss Petard (Ribblesdale Stakes), Pitcairn (Wills Mile, sire of Ela-Mana-Mou) and English Prince (Irish Derby, sire of Sun Princess).

Petingo's greatest success was posthumous. In 1978 his daughter Fair Salinia won The Oaks to give her sire his first British classic winner whilst Sandy Creek won the William Hill Futurity. His 1975 covering of a mare named La Milo resulted in a bay colt named Troy who won The Derby, Irish Derby, King George VI and Queen Elizabeth Diamond Stakes and the Benson & Hedges Gold Cup in 1979. Troy's achievements led to Petingo becoming that year's Leading sire in Great Britain and Ireland.

Petingo was also the damsire of Petoski and the sire of Three Legs who was exported to New Zealand where he sired the Japan Cup winner Horlicks.

== Pedigree ==
Pedigree of Petingo (GB), bay stallion, 1965
Sire Petition (GB) 1944	Fair Trial (GB); 1932	Fairway	Phalaris
Sire Petition (GB) 1944	Fair Trial (GB); 1932	Fairway	Scapa Flow
Sire Petition (GB) 1944	Fair Trial (GB); 1932	Lady Juror	Son-in-Law
Sire Petition (GB) 1944	Fair Trial (GB); 1932	Lady Juror	Lady Josephine
Sire Petition (GB) 1944	Art Paper (GB); 1933	Artists Proof	Gainsborough
Sire Petition (GB) 1944	Art Paper (GB); 1933	Artists Proof	Clear Evidence
Sire Petition (GB) 1944	Art Paper (GB); 1933	Quire	Fairy King
Sire Petition (GB) 1944	Art Paper (GB); 1933	Quire	Queen Carbine
Dam Alcazar (FR) 1957	Alycidon (GB); 1945	Donatello	Blenheim
Dam Alcazar (FR) 1957	Alycidon (GB); 1945	Donatello	Delleana
Dam Alcazar (FR) 1957	Alycidon (GB); 1945	Aurora	Hyperion
Dam Alcazar (FR) 1957	Alycidon (GB); 1945	Aurora	Rose Red
Dam Alcazar (FR) 1957	Quarterdeck (GB); 1947	Nearco	Pharos
Dam Alcazar (FR) 1957	Quarterdeck (GB); 1947	Nearco	Nogara
Dam Alcazar (FR) 1957	Quarterdeck (GB); 1947	Poker Chip	The Recorder
Dam Alcazar (FR) 1957	Quarterdeck (GB); 1947	Poker Chip	Straight Sequence (Family:22)
