= Petition (horse) =

British-bred Thoroughbred racehorse

- Sire: Fair Trial
- Grandsire: Fairway
- Dam: Art Paper
- Damsire: Artit's Proof
- Sex: Stallion
- Foaled: 1944
- Died: 1964 (aged 19–20)
- Country: United Kingdom
- Colour: Bay
- Owner: Sir Alfred Butt
- Trainer: Frank Butters
- Record: 12: 7-2-2

Major wins
- New Stakes (1946); Richmond Stakes (1946); Gimcrack Stakes (1946); Champagne Stakes (1946); Victoria Cup (1948); Eclipse Stakes (1948)

Petition (1944–1964) was a British Thoroughbred racehorse and sire. He was officially rated the second-best two-year-old in Britain in 1946 when he won the New Stakes, Richmond Stakes, Gimcrack Stakes and Champagne Stakes. He won on his debut in 1947 but sustained an injury when finishing unplaced in the 2000 Guineas and failed to win in two subsequent races that year. In 1948 he returned to his best form to beat a strong field in the Eclipse Stakes. He was retired to stud where he became a successful and influential breeding stallion.

== Background ==
Petition was a brown horse bred by his owner, Sir Alfred Butt. He was sired by Fair Trial, whose other offspring included Palestine, Festoon and Court Martial. Petition's dam Art Paper, won two races and had produced the Dewhurst Stakes winner Paper Weight.

The colt was sent into training with Frank Butters at his Fitzroy stable in Newmarket, Suffolk.

== Racing career ==
=== 1946: two-year-old season ===
As a two-year-old, Petition was ridden in most of his races by Harry Wragg. He made his racecourse debut at York Racecourse in May finishing third in the Eglington Stakes. In the following month, he was sent to Royal Ascot for the New Stakes (the race now known as the Norfolk Stakes) over five furlongs. He started at odds of 7/4 and won from Goldsborough with the future Prix de l'Arc de Triomphe Migoli in third. The opposition to Petition in the Richmond Stakes at Goodwood Racecourse was not strong and he won easily at odds of 1/5. In August he started 13/8 favourite for the Gimcrack takes over six furlongs at York and won from Sayajirao a colt who went on to win the Irish Derby and the St Leger Stakes in the following year. Petition ended his season in the Champagne Stakes at Doncaster Racecourse in September. Edgar Britt, an Australian jockey, took over from Wragg on Petition, and the colt won his fourth consecutive race at odds of 21/20.

=== 1947: three-year-old season ===
Petition began his second season in the Henry VIII Stakes at Hurst Park Racecourse, a trial race for the 2000 Guineas, and won by ten lengths from Sayajirao. Following this race he was considered the only horse likely to challenge the undefeated Tudor Minstrel in the Guineas, but his chance was lost just before the start when he reared up and fell backwards. He ran in the race but made no impression and finished unplaced, returning with a back injury which kept him off the racecourse for three months.

Petition reappeared at Goodwood for the one-mile Sussex Stakes, which was then a race restricted to three-year-olds. He finished second, beaten by Tudor Minstrel's unbeaten stable companion Combat. On his only other race of the season he was again matched against Tudor Minstrel in the Knight's Royal Stakes at Ascot in September. On this occasion he finished third behind Tudor Minstrel and the French-trained seven-year-old Vagabond.

=== 1948: four-year-old season ===
On his four-year-old debut, Petition recorded his first success for a year when he won the Victoria Cup, a seven furlong handicap race carrying a weight of 129 pounds. He next ran in the Rous Memorial Stakes at Royal Ascot where he was unsuited by the slow pace and finished second to his only rival Oros. In July he was moved up in distance for one of Britain's most prestigious and valuable weight-for-age races, the Eclipse Stakes over ten furlongs at Sandown Park Racecourse. Ridden by Ken Gethin, he started at 8/1 in a field which included Migoli (who had won the race in 1947), Sayajirao and the future American champion Noor. Petition produced a late run to win by a short head from Sayajirao with Noor in third place.

== Assessment ==
In 1946, Petition was rated the second best two-year-old to race in Britain in the official Free Handicap, two pounds behind Tudor Minstrel. The independent Timeform organisation gave him a peak annual rating of 130 in 1948, placing him five pounds below the top-rated older horses Arbar and Tenerani.

== Stud record ==
Petition was retired from racing to become a breeding stallion at his owner's Brook Stud in Newmarket. The best of his offspring was the grey mare Petite Etoile whose wins included the 1000 Guineas, Oaks, Champion Stakes and Coronation Cup. His best colt was Petingo who was Timeform's top-rated racehorse of 1967. He was also the damsire of the 1000 Guineas winner Night Off and Falcon, the sire of the Champion Hurdler Night Nurse. Several of Petition's sons became successful sires: Petingo sired the Derby winner Troy and was the grandsire of the King George VI and Queen Elizabeth Stakes winner Ela-Mana-Mou; March Past, a sprinter, sired Queen's Hussar who in turn sired Brigadier Gerard and Highclere. Petition died of heart failure in 1964 at the Brook Stud.

== Pedigree ==
Pedigree of Petition (GB), brown stallion, 1944
Sire Fair Trial (GB) 1932	Fairway (GB); 1925	Phalaris	Polymelus
Sire Fair Trial (GB) 1932	Fairway (GB); 1925	Phalaris	Bromus
Sire Fair Trial (GB) 1932	Fairway (GB); 1925	Scapa Flow	Chaucer
Sire Fair Trial (GB) 1932	Fairway (GB); 1925	Scapa Flow	Anchora
Sire Fair Trial (GB) 1932	Lady Juror (GB); 1919	Son-in-Law	Dark Ronald
Sire Fair Trial (GB) 1932	Lady Juror (GB); 1919	Son-in-Law	Mother In Law
Sire Fair Trial (GB) 1932	Lady Juror (GB); 1919	Lady Josephine	Sundridge
Sire Fair Trial (GB) 1932	Lady Juror (GB); 1919	Lady Josephine	Americus Girl
Dam Art Paper (GB) 1933	Artist's Proof (GB); 1926	Gainsborough	Bayardo
Dam Art Paper (GB) 1933	Artist's Proof (GB); 1926	Gainsborough	Rosedrop
Dam Art Paper (GB) 1933	Artist's Proof (GB); 1926	Clear Evidence	Tracery
Dam Art Paper (GB) 1933	Artist's Proof (GB); 1926	Clear Evidence	Honora
Dam Art Paper (GB) 1933	Quire (GB); 1918	Fairy King	Desmond
Dam Art Paper (GB) 1933	Quire (GB); 1918	Fairy King	Queen Fairy
Dam Art Paper (GB) 1933	Quire (GB); 1918	Queen Carbine	Carbine
Dam Art Paper (GB) 1933	Quire (GB); 1918	Queen Carbine	Sceptre (Family: 16-h)
