= Princess Pati =

Racehorse trained in Ireland

- Sire: Top Ville
- Grandsire: High Top
- Dam: Sarah Siddons
- Damsire: Le Levanstell
- Sex: Mare
- Foaled: 8 March 1981
- Country: Ireland
- Colour: Bay
- Breeder: Ardenode Stud
- Owner: Meg Mullion
- Trainer: Con Collins
- Record: 12: 4-0-3

Major wins
- Pretty Polly Stakes (1983); Irish Oaks (1984)

Awards
- Top-rated Irish three-year-old filly (1984); Timeform rating: 83 p (1983), 124 (1984)

Princess Pati (8 March 1981 – after 1999) was an Irish Thoroughbred racehorse and broodmare. After showing promise when finishing third on her only start as a two-year-old in 1983 she improved in the following year to become the best filly of her generation in Ireland. With the implementation of front-running tactics she won four races including the Pretty Polly Stakes and the Irish Oaks as well as finishing third in the Irish Champion Stakes. She failed to reproduce her best form in 1985 and was retired from racing at the end of the year. As a broodmare she produced winners, the best of whom was the Cambridgeshire Handicap winner Pasternak.

== Background ==
Princess Pati was a "lengthy" bay mare with a white star and snip and a white sock on her right hind leg bred in Ireland by the Ardenode Stud, which was owned and managed by Jim and Meg Mullion. During her racing career she carried the colours of Meg Mullion and was trained at the Curragh in Ireland by Con Collins.

Her sire Top Ville was an Irish-bred, French-trained horse who won the Prix du Jockey Club in 1979. At stud his other progeny included Toulon, Saint Estephe, Pistolet Bleu (Grand Prix de Saint-Cloud), Darara and Shardari. Princess Pati's dam Sarah Siddons was a top-class performer who won the Irish 1,000 Guineas and Yorkshire Oaks for the Mullions in 1976 before becoming a successful broodmare: she also produced the Great Voltigeur Stakes winner Seymour Hicks and was the female-line ancestor of numerous winners including Excelebration and the Prix Vermeille winner Leggera. Sarah Siddons was the first of only three foals produced by Mariel, a high-class mare who won the Pretty Polly Stakes, and was placed in the Irish 1000 Guineas, Epsom Oaks and Irish Oaks. Mariel's dam Ela Marita won the Fred Darling Stakes and the Musidora Stakes and was a half-sister to Ragusa.

== Racing career ==
=== 1983: two-year-old season ===
Princess Pati made her racecourse debut in a maiden race over seven furlongs at Leopardstown Racecourse in September 1983. She led the field until the closing stages and finished third of the eighteen runners behind Princess Tracy, a filly who had previously finished fourth in the Moyglare Stud Stakes.

=== 1984: three-year-old season ===
Princess Pati began her second season with a victory in a maiden race over six furlongs at the Curragh and then took the April Stakes over seven furlongs at the same track, winning with "impressive ease" on both occasions. In May she was stepped up in class and distance for the Group 1 Irish 1,000 Guineas over one mile and finished seventh of the twenty-three runners behind the British-trained Katies. It was subsequently revealed that the filly had been in season at the time of the race. In June she was matched against male opposition in the Woodpark Stud Race over ten furlongs at Phoenix Park Racecourse and finished third behind the colts Sondrio and Solar City. She returned to winning form at the Curragh later that month when she won the Pretty Polly Stakes over ten furlongs, beating the Dermot Weld-trained Quick Reference by six lengths after making most of the running under Pat Shanahan.

In the Irish Oaks over one and a half miles on firm ground at the Curragh in July she started 9/2 second choice in the betting behind The Oaks winner Circus Plume with the other nine runners including Clare Bridge (second in the Prix de Malleret) and the Epsom runner-up Media Luna. Shanahan sent Princess Pati into the lead from the start and opened up a clear advantage while Lester Piggott restrained the favourite towards the rear. Princess Pati's advantage diminished on the final turn but she accelerated again in the straight and had no difficulty holding off Circus Plume to win by two lengths in a new course record time of 2:28.60. Shanahan, who was in his first season as a professional jockey later recalled that he had been "a nervous wreck" at the prospect of riding against Piggott, who had been his childhood idol.

In her two remaining races of the season, Princess Pati was matched against the best weight-for-age competition. In the Phoenix Champion Stakes, the most valuable horse race ever run up to that time in Ireland, she led for most of the way before coming home third to Sadler's Wells and Seattle Song with Desirable and Tolomeo among those finishing behind her. On her final appearance of the season she made her first start outside Ireland when she was sent to France to contest the Prix de l'Arc de Triomphe over 2400 metres at Longchamp Racecourse in October. She was among the early leaders but lost her place entering the straight as she tired on the heavy ground and finished unplaced behind Sagace.

=== 1985: four-year-old season ===
Princess Pati remained in training as a four-year-old but made no impact in three races. She was equipped with blinkers on her debut when she finished unplaced in the Tattersalls Gold Cup in May and then slipped and fell on her next start. In her final appearance she started a 100/1 outsider and finished eleventh of the twelve runners behind Petoski in the King George VI and Queen Elizabeth Stakes at Ascot Racecourse on 27 July.

== Assessment ==
In 1983 the independent Timeform organisation described Princess Pati as "promising" and awarded her a rating on 83 p, the "p" indicating that she was likely to make more than usual progress. In the official International Classification for 1984 she was the highest-rated Irish-trained three-year-old filly and the fifth best filly of her generation in Europe behind Northern Trick, Katies, Reine Mathilde and Circus Plume. Timeform gave her a rating of 124 in 1984, seven pounds behind Northern Trick and described her as "an admirably genuine sort".

Pat Shanahan regarded her as the best horse he ever rode.

== Breeding record ==
After her retirement from racing Princess Pati became a broodmare for the Arenode Stud. She produced at least eight foals and six winners between 1987 and 1999:

- Srivijaya, a bay colt (later gelded), foaled in 1987, sired by Kris. Won three flat races and five National Hunt races.
- Maxwelton Braes, bay colt (gelded), 1989, by Lomond. Won one race.
- Princess Pavlova, bay filly, 1990, by Sadler's Wells. Unraced.
- Parthian Springs, bay colt, 1991, by Sadler's Wells. Won three races.
- Pasternak, bay colt, 1993, by Soviet Star. Won four races including Cambridgeshire Handicap.
- Arapi, bay filly, 1994, by Arazi. Won two races.
- Milling, bay filly, 1995, by In The Wings. Won one race.
- Compton Dictator, bay colt (gelded), 1999, by Shareef Dancer. Failed to win in eight races.

== Pedigree ==
Pedigree of Princess Pati (IRE), bay mare, 1981
Sire Top Ville (IRE) 1976	High Top (IRE); 1969	Derring-Do	Darius
Sire Top Ville (IRE) 1976	High Top (IRE); 1969	Derring-Do	Sipsey Bridge
Sire Top Ville (IRE) 1976	High Top (IRE); 1969	Camenae	Vimy
Sire Top Ville (IRE) 1976	High Top (IRE); 1969	Camenae	Madrilene
Sire Top Ville (IRE) 1976	Sega Ville (FR); 1968	Charlottesville	Prince Chevalier
Sire Top Ville (IRE) 1976	Sega Ville (FR); 1968	Charlottesville	Noorani
Sire Top Ville (IRE) 1976	Sega Ville (FR); 1968	La Sega	Tantieme
Sire Top Ville (IRE) 1976	Sega Ville (FR); 1968	La Sega	La Danse
Dam Sarah Siddons (FR) 1973	Le Levanstell (IRE); 1957	Le Lavandou	Djebel
Dam Sarah Siddons (FR) 1973	Le Levanstell (IRE); 1957	Le Lavandou	Lavande
Dam Sarah Siddons (FR) 1973	Le Levanstell (IRE); 1957	Stella's Sister	Ballyogan
Dam Sarah Siddons (FR) 1973	Le Levanstell (IRE); 1957	Stella's Sister	My Aid
Dam Sarah Siddons (FR) 1973	Mariel (GB); 1968	Relko	Tanerko
Dam Sarah Siddons (FR) 1973	Mariel (GB); 1968	Relko	Relance
Dam Sarah Siddons (FR) 1973	Mariel (GB); 1968	Ela Marita	Red God
Dam Sarah Siddons (FR) 1973	Mariel (GB); 1968	Ela Marita	Fantan (Family: 9)
