= 1986 Prix de l'Arc de Triomphe =

Horse race held at Longchamp, France

- Location: Longchamp Racecourse
- Date: October 5, 1986
- Winning horse: Dancing Brave

The 1986 Prix de l'Arc de Triomphe was a horse race held at Longchamp on Sunday 5 October 1986. It was the 65th running of the Prix de l'Arc de Triomphe.

The winner was Dancing Brave, a three-year-old colt trained in Great Britain by Guy Harwood. The winning jockey was Pat Eddery.

The winning time of 2m 27.7s set a new record for the race. The previous record of 2m 28.0s was achieved by Detroit in 1980.

The field is considered to be one of the strongest in the race's history. Major races won by the runners in 1986 included;

- Dancing Brave – 2,000 Guineas Stakes, Eclipse Stakes, King George VI and Queen Elizabeth Stakes
- Bering – Prix du Jockey Club
- Triptych – Champion Stakes
- Shahrastani – Epsom Derby, Irish Derby
- Shardari – International Stakes
- Darara – Prix Vermeille
- Acatenango – Aral-Pokal, Grand Prix de Saint-Cloud, Grosser Preis von Berlin
- Saint Estephe – Coronation Cup

The strength of the field and Dancing Brave's performance led to the race coming first in a Racing Post readers' vote in 2022 to decide the "Greatest ever horse race".

== Race details ==
- Sponsor: Trusthouse Forte
- Purse: 6,800,000 F; First prize: 4,000,000 F
- Going: Firm
- Distance: 2,400 metres
- Number of runners: 15
- Winner's time: 2m 27.7s (new record)

== Full result ==
Pos.	Marg.	Horse	Age	Jockey	Trainer (Country)
1		Dancing Brave	3	Pat Eddery	Guy Harwood (GB)
2	1½	Bering	3	Gary W. Moore	Criquette Head (FR)
3	½	Triptych	4	Angel Cordero	Patrick Biancone (FR)
4	shd	Shahrastani	3	Walter Swinburn	Michael Stoute (GB)
5	nk	Shardari	4	Greville Starkey	Michael Stoute (GB)
6	1½	Darara	3	Yves Saint-Martin	Alain de Royer-Dupré (FR)
7	2	Acatenango	4	Steve Cauthen	Heinz Jentzsch (GER)
8	nk	Mersey	4	Freddy Head	Patrick Biancone (FR)
9	1½	Saint Estephe	4	Cash Asmussen	André Fabre (FR)
10	nk	Dihistan	4	Tony Kimberley	Michael Stoute (GB)
11	1	Iades	4	Alain Lequeux	François Boutin (FR)
12	2	Baby Turk	4	Alfred Gibert	Alain de Royer-Dupré (FR)
13	1½	Nemain	4	Christy Roche	David O'Brien (IRE)
14	2	Sirius Symboli	4	Maurice Philipperon	Freddie Palmer (FR)
15	1½	Maria Fumata	4	Fernando Diaz	Juan Cavieres (CHI)

- Abbreviations: shd = short-head; nk = neck

== Winner's details ==
Further details of the winner, Dancing Brave.

- Sex: Colt
- Foaled: 11 May 1983
- Country: United States
- Sire: Lyphard; Dam: Navajo Princess (Drone)
- Owner: Khalid Abdullah
- Breeder: Glen Oak Farm
