= Saint Estephe (horse) =

French-bred Thoroughbred racehorse

- Sire: Top Ville
- Grandsire: High Top
- Dam: Une Tornade
- Damsire: Traffic
- Sex: Stallion
- Foaled: 24 February 1982
- Country: France
- Colour: Bay
- Breeder: D. Darlix, A. Balbous & P. Dubois
- Owner: Yan Houyvet
- Trainer: André Fabre
- Record: 13: 4-4-4

Major wins
- Prix Maurice de Nieuil (1985); Prix d'Harcourt (1986); Coronation Cup (1986)

Awards
- Timeform rating 121 (1985), 123 (1986)

Saint Estephe (24 February 1982 – 19 April 1998) was a French Thoroughbred racehorse and sire. Unraced as a juvenile, he proved himself to be a high-class middle-distance performer in 1985 when he won the Prix Maurice de Nieuil and was placed in the Prix Hocquart, Prix du Lys, Prix Niel and Prix du Conseil de Paris. In the following year, he was even better, winning the Prix d'Harcourt and finishing third in the Prix Ganay before recording his greatest success in the Coronation Cup. He went on to finish second in the Grand Prix de Saint-Cloud and the Prix du Prince d'Orange before sustaining a career-ending injury in the Prix de l'Arc de Triomphe. He was retired to stud in France and had some success as a breeding stallion before dying at the age of sixteen in 1998.

== Background ==
Saint Estephe was a "leggy" bay horse with a diamond-shaped white star and a white sock on his left hind leg bred in France by D. Darlix, A. Balbous & P. Dubois. His sire Top Ville was an Irish-bred, French-trained horse which won the Prix du Jockey Club in 1979. At stud he also sired Toulon, Pistolet Bleu (Grand Prix de Saint-Cloud), Darara and Shardari. Saint Estephe's dam Une Tornade was a Listed race winner in France and was descended from Pontoon, a half-sister of The Derby winner Pont l'Eveque.

During his racing career, Saint Estephe was owned by Yan Houyvet and trained in France by André Fabre.

== Racing career ==
=== 1985: three-year-old season ===
After finishing third over 2000 metres on his racecourse debut, Saint Estephe recorded his first win in a race over 2100 metres at Saint-Cloud Racecourse in April. He was then moved up in class and finished third behind Mouktar in the Prix Hocquart at Longchamp in May and second to Iades in the Prix du Lys at Chantilly in June. In July the colt was matched against older horses in the Prix Maurice de Nieuil at Saint-Cloud. Ridden by Alfred Gibert he won by half a length from the four-year-old Complice with the German challenger Abary in third place. In the Prix Niel at Longchamp in September he finished second by a nose to Mouktar in a photo finish. On his final appearance of the season Saint Estephe was ridden by Lester Piggott and started odd-on favourite for the Prix du Conseil de Paris and finished third behind Jupiter Island and Baby Turk.

=== 1986: four-year-old season ===
On his first appearance as a four-year-old Saint Estephe contested the Group Three Prix d'Harcourt over 2000 metres at Longchamp in April and won by six lengths from Over the Ocean, the winner of the European Free Handicap and Prix Perth. In the Prix Ganay on 4 May he started odds-on favourite but was beaten a short head and half a length into third place behind Baillamont and Mersey with Triptych in fourth. On 5 June Saint Estephe and Triptych represent France in the 81st running of the Coronation Cup over one and a half miles at Epsom Racecourse. Shardari started favourite ahead of Petoski and Phardante (a winner over Slip Anchor in the Jockey Club Stakes) with Saint Estephe, ridden by Pat Eddery, starting a 20/1 outsider in a ten-runner field. After being restrained at the rear of the field he moved up on the outside to track the leaders early in the straight and gained the advantage from Triptych inside the final furlong. Saint Estephe hung to the left in the closing stages, but held off the renewed challenge of Triptych to win by a short head.

Saint Estephe attempted to add a second Group One victory a month later in the Grand Prix de Saint-Cloud but was beaten two lengths into second place by the German colt Acatenango. After a summer break he returned in September for the Prix du Prince d'Orange, a trial race for the Prix de l'Arc de Triomphe, and finished second to the filly Fitnah (Prix Saint-Alary) with the hitherto undefeated Fast Topaze (Poule d'Essai des Poulains) in third. In an exceptionally strong renewal of the Prix de l'Arc de Triomphe on 5 October Saint Estephe finished ninth of the fifteen runners behind Dancing Brave, beaten seven and half lengths by the winner. He sustained a leg injury during the race and finished lame.

== Assessment ==
In the official International Classification for 1985 Saint Estephe was rated the ninth-best three-year-old colt in Europe in the 11 furlong+ division, thirteen pounds behind Slip Anchor. The independent Timeform organisation gave him a rating of 121, fifteen pounds behind Slip Anchor, who was their top-rated three-year-old. In their annual Racehorses of 1985, Timeform described him being a "smart" who acted on all types of ground. In the following year's International Classification he was the rated the sixth-best older horse in the 11 furlong+ division. Timeform rated him on 123 and described him as "consistency itself".

== Stud record ==
Saint Estephe was retired from racing and became a breeding stallion at the Haras de Saint-Pair-du-Mont in Calvados. The best of his offspring were Pigeon Voyageur (Prix Saint-Roman, Gran Premio d'Italia) and Gravieres (Santa Ana Handicap). He died in April 1998.

== Pedigree ==
Pedigree of Saint Estephe (FR), bay horse, 1982
| Sire Top Ville (IRE) 1976 | High Top (IRE); 1969 | Derring-Do | Darius |
| Sire Top Ville (IRE) 1976 | High Top (IRE); 1969 | Derring-Do | Sipsey Bridge |
| Sire Top Ville (IRE) 1976 | High Top (IRE); 1969 | Camenae | Vimy |
| Sire Top Ville (IRE) 1976 | High Top (IRE); 1969 | Camenae | Madrilene |
| Sire Top Ville (IRE) 1976 | Sega Ville (FR); 1968 | Charlottesville | Prince Chevalier |
| Sire Top Ville (IRE) 1976 | Sega Ville (FR); 1968 | Charlottesville | Noorani |
| Sire Top Ville (IRE) 1976 | Sega Ville (FR); 1968 | La Sega | Tantieme |
| Sire Top Ville (IRE) 1976 | Sega Ville (FR); 1968 | La Sega | La Danse |
| Dam Une Tornade (FR) 1969 | Traffic (USA); 1961 | Traffic Judge | Alibhai |
| Dam Une Tornade (FR) 1969 | Traffic (USA); 1961 | Traffic Judge | Traffic Court |
| Dam Une Tornade (FR) 1969 | Traffic (USA); 1961 | Capelet | Bolero |
| Dam Une Tornade (FR) 1969 | Traffic (USA); 1961 | Capelet | Quick Touch |
| Dam Une Tornade (FR) 1969 | Rough Sea (GB); 1964 | Herbager | Vandale |
| Dam Une Tornade (FR) 1969 | Rough Sea (GB); 1964 | Herbager | Flagette |
| Dam Une Tornade (FR) 1969 | Rough Sea (GB); 1964 | Sea Nymph | Free Man |
| Dam Une Tornade (FR) 1969 | Rough Sea (GB); 1964 | Sea Nymph | Sea Spray (Family: 3-f) |
