= Shardari =

Irish-bred Thoroughbred racehorse

- Sire: Top Ville
- Grandsire: High Top
- Dam: Sharmada
- Damsire: Zeddaan
- Sex: Stallion
- Foaled: 1 May 1982
- Country: Ireland
- Colour: Bay
- Breeder: Aga Khan IV
- Owner: Aga Khan IV
- Trainer: Michael Stoute
- Record: 13: 6-5-0

Major wins
- Cumberland Lodge Stakes (1985); St. Simon Stakes (1985); Princess of Wales's Stakes (1986); International Stakes (1986)

Awards
- Top-rated European Older Horse (1986); Timeform rating 134 (1986)

Shardari (1 May 1982 – ca. 1999) was an Irish-bred, British-trained Thoroughbred racehorse and sire. He was unraced as a two-year-old before winning four of his six races as a three-year-old in 1985 including the Cumberland Lodge Stakes and St. Simon Stakes. In the following year he was tried at the highest level, winning the Princess of Wales's Stakes and International Stakes and finishing second to Dancing Brave in the King George VI and Queen Elizabeth Stakes. He was retired to stud at the end of 1986 but had little success as a sire of winners.

== Background ==
Shardari was a bay horse with a faint white star and white socks on his hind legs bred in Ireland by his owner the Aga Khan IV. His sire Top Ville was an Irish-bred, French-trained horse which won the Prix du Jockey Club in 1979. At stud he also sired Toulon, winner of the St Leger Stakes, Pistolet Bleu (Grand Prix de Saint-Cloud), Saint Estephe (Coronation Cup) and Darara (Prix Vermeille). His dam Sharmada finished second in the Prix d'Arenberg and was a great-granddaughter of Gourabe, whose other descendants included the Prix de Diane winner Dunette.

The colt went into training with Michael Stoute at his Freemason Lodge stable in Newmarket, Suffolk.

== Racing career ==
=== 1985: three-year-old season ===
Shardari was a late developing horse who did not race until the summer of his three-year-old season. He began his career by beating moderate opposition in the More Lane Stakes over ten furlongs at Sandown Park Racecourse and the Smeeth Stakes over the same distance at Folkestone. He was then moved up in class and distance for the Listed Alycidon Stakes over one and a half miles at Goodwood Racecourse in July. He started favourite, but finished second to his stable companion Shernazar, a four-year-old half-brother to Shergar. His next race was the Group Two Great Voltigeur Stakes at York Racecourse on 21 August when he was made 7/4 joint favourite with Damister, a colt who had won the Dante Stakes and finished third in The Derby. Shardari was assigned a weight of 119 pounds, four pounds less than his main rival. The two favourites dominated the finish, with Shardari overtaking Damister fifty yards from the finish to win by a neck. The racecourse stewards, however, relegated the winner to second place and issued a four-day riding ban to his jockey Walter Swinburn for bumping the runner-up in the closing stages. The decision was controversial, as Shardari appeared to have proved himself the better horse at the weights, but it was upheld following an appeal to the Jockey Club.

The Great Voltigeur is often regarded as a trial for the St Leger Stakes, but Shardari had never been entered for the race. His next appearance was in the Cumberland Lodge Stakes in September at Ascot Racecourse, where his opponents included Phardante, who had finished second to the filly Oh So Sharp in the St Leger. Confidently ridden by Swinburn, Shardari took the lead in the straight and won easily by six lengths. On his final race of the year, Shardari started evens favourite for the St Simon Stakes at Newbury Racecourse. He took the lead three furlongs from the finish and drew clear of the field to win by fifteen lengths from Free Guest, a filly who had won the Nassau Stakes and two runnings of the Sun Chariot Stakes.

=== 1986: four-year-old season ===
On his four-year-old debut, Shardari started the odds-on favourite for the Ormonde Stakes at Chester Racecourse in May. He took the lead three furlongs from the finish, but tired badly in the soft ground and was easily beaten by Brunico, a 33/1 outsider best known for his performances in hurdle races. He was again disappointing in the Coronation Cup at Epsom in June, when he finished fourth behind Saint Estephe, Triptych and Petoski. In July at Newmarket Racecourse Shardari started at odds of 5/2 for the Group Two Princess of Wales's Stakes and won from Baby Turk, with Petoski in third place.

Shardari next ran in Britain's most prestigious all-aged race, the King George VI and Queen Elizabeth Stakes over one and a half miles at Ascot. He was accompanied by his stable companions Shahrastani, winner of the Epsom Derby and Irish Derby and Dihistan, the winner of the Hardwicke Stakes at Royal Ascot. The rest of the field included Dancing Brave, Petoski and Triptych. After Petoski's two pacemakers dropped from contention, Shardari turned into the straight in second place behind Dihistan and took the lead two furlongs from the finish. He was quickly overtaken by Dancing Brave who opened up a clear lead, but then made a renewed challenge and reduced the leader's margin to three quarters of a length at the line. As a four-year-old, Shardari was conceding thirteen pounds to the three-year-old winner.

On his next appearance, Sharadari was brought back in distance for the Matchmaker International over ten and a half furlongs at York. Ridden by Swinburn, he started the 13/8 favourite and recorded his only Group One victory, beating Triptych and Damister. Shardari's final European race was the Prix de l'Arc de Triomphe. In an exceptionally strong field he finished fifth of the fifteen runners behind Dancing Brave, Bering, Triptych and Shahrastani. Two weeks later, Shardari was sent to Canada where he started favourite for the Rothmans International at Woodbine Racetrack but finished second to the Dogwood Stable's three-year-old Southjet. Stoute stated that the horse had been ill-suited by the soft ground

== Assessment ==
In the official International Classification for 1985, Shardari was given a rating of 87, making him the sixth best three-year-old colt in Europe. The independent Timeform organisation awarded him a rating of 132, placing him fourth among his generation behind Slip Anchor (136), Petoski (135) and Shadeed (135). In the following year Shardari was the highest-rated older horse in the International Classification and was given a rating of 134 by Timeform. In their book, A Century of Champions, based on the Timeform rating system, John Randall and Tony Morris rated Shardari the 149th best racehorse trained in Britain or Ireland in the 20th century.

== Stud record ==
Shardari's stud record was disappointing with best flat race performers being horses which won at Group Three level:

- Tashkourgan (filly 1988) won Group Three Premio Carlo Porta
- Samourzakan (colt 1989) won Grade III Laurence Armour Handicap
- Linnga (filly 1989) won Group Three Prix Minerve

He had some success as a sire of National Hunt horses. Flame Creek won the Grade II Champion Hurdle Trial at Haydock Park Racecourse in 2003 whilst Walk On Seas was a successful hurdler in France. By 1999, the last recorded year in which he stood as a breeding stallion, Shardari was covering mares at a fee of £1,000.

== Pedigree ==
Pedigree of Shardari (IRE), bay horse, 1982
Sire Top Ville (IRE) 1976	High Top (IRE); 1969	Derring-Do	Darius
Sire Top Ville (IRE) 1976	High Top (IRE); 1969	Derring-Do	Sipsey Bridge
Sire Top Ville (IRE) 1976	High Top (IRE); 1969	Camenae	Vimy
Sire Top Ville (IRE) 1976	High Top (IRE); 1969	Camenae	Madrilene
Sire Top Ville (IRE) 1976	Sega Ville (FR); 1968	Charlottesville	Prince Chevalier
Sire Top Ville (IRE) 1976	Sega Ville (FR); 1968	Charlottesville	Noorani
Sire Top Ville (IRE) 1976	Sega Ville (FR); 1968	La Sega	Tantieme
Sire Top Ville (IRE) 1976	Sega Ville (FR); 1968	La Sega	La Danse
Dam Sharmada (FR) 1978	Zeddaan (GB); 1965	Grey Sovereign	Nasrullah
Dam Sharmada (FR) 1978	Zeddaan (GB); 1965	Grey Sovereign	Kong
Dam Sharmada (FR) 1978	Zeddaan (GB); 1965	Vareta	Vilmorin
Dam Sharmada (FR) 1978	Zeddaan (GB); 1965	Vareta	Veronique
Dam Sharmada (FR) 1978	Shireen (FR); 1965	Prince Taj	Prince Bio
Dam Sharmada (FR) 1978	Shireen (FR); 1965	Prince Taj	Malindi
Dam Sharmada (FR) 1978	Shireen (FR); 1965	Clair Obscur	Honeyway
Dam Sharmada (FR) 1978	Shireen (FR); 1965	Clair Obscur	Gourabe (Family: 26)
