= 1986 King George VI and Queen Elizabeth Stakes =

36th King George VI and Queen Elizabeth Stakes
- King George VI and Queen Elizabeth Stakes
- Location: Ascot Racecourse
- Date: 26 July 1986
- Winning horse: Dancing Brave (USA)
- Jockey: Pat Eddery
- Trainer: Guy Harwood (GB)
- Owner: Khalid Abdullah

The 1986 King George VI and Queen Elizabeth Stakes was a horse race held at Ascot Racecourse on Saturday 26 July 1986. It was the 36th running of the King George VI and Queen Elizabeth Stakes.

The winner was Khalid Abdullah's Dancing Brave, a three-year-old bay colt trained at Newmarket, Suffolk by Guy Harwood and ridden by the Irish jockey Pat Eddery. Dancing Brave's victory was the first in the race for his owner, and the second for Harwood after Kalaglow in 1982. Eddery had previously won the race with Grundy in 1975.

== The contenders ==
The race attracted a field of nine runners, eight trained in the United Kingdom and one in France. The favourite was the Michael Stoute-trained Shahrastani, a three-year-old colt owned by the Aga Khan who had won the Epsom Derby and Irish Derby. Stoute and the Aga Khan were also represented by the four-year-olds Shardari (Princess of Wales's Stakes and Dihistan (Hardwicke Stakes). Shahrastani's main opposition appeared likely to come from Dancing Brave who had won the 2000 Guineas, finished second in the Derby and then defeated older horses in the Eclipse Stakes. The French challenger was the four-year-old filly Triptych the winner of the Prix Marcel Boussac and the Irish 2000 Guineas who had finished second to Dancing Brave in the Eclipse. The other major contender was Petoski the winner of the previous year's race who was accompanied by his stable companions Boldden and Vouchsafe who were entered in the race to act as pacemakers. The only other runner was Supreme Leader, the winner of the Earl of Sefton Stakes and Westbury Stakes. Shahrastani headed the betting at odds of 11/10 ahead of Dancing Brave (6/4) with Petoski and Shardari next in the betting at 14/1.

== The race ==
Boldden took the lead form the start and set a very fast pace from Vouchsafe and the two pacemakers quickly opened up a ten length lead from Dihistan, Shardari and Shahrastani. Supreme Leader and Petoski came next ahead of Dancing Brave and Triptych. The pacemakers dropped away with half a mile left to run, at which point Dihistan took the advantage and led the field into the straight from Shahrastani and Shardari with Dancing Brave making progress. Shardari overtook Dihistan two furlong from the finish but was immediately challenged by Dancing Brave on the outside as Shahrastani began to struggle. Dancing Brave took the lead approaching the final furlong and drifted to the right, causing Shardari to switch to the left in the closing stages. Dancing Brave held off the renewed challenge of Shardari to win by three quarters of a length with a gap of four lengths back to the fast-finishing Triptych. Shahrastani was a further five lengths back in fourth, ahead of Dihistan, Petoski and Supreme Leader.

== Race details ==
- Sponsor: De Beers
- First prize: £152,468
- Surface: Turf
- Going: Good
- Distance: 12 furlongs
- Number of runners: 9
- Winner's time: 2:29.49

== Full result ==
Pos.	Marg.	Horse (bred)	Age	Jockey	Trainer (Country)	Odds
1		Dancing Brave (USA)	3	Pat Eddery	Guy Harwood (GB)	6/4
2	¾	Shardari (IRE)	4	Steve Cauthen	Michael Stoute (GB)	14/1
3	4	Triptych (USA)	4	Yves Saint-Martin	Patrick Biancone (FR)	25/1
4	5	Shahrastani (USA)	3	Walter Swinburn	Michael Stoute (GB)	11/10 fav
5	2	Dihistan (IRE)	4	Tony Kimberley	Michael Stoute (GB)	100/1
6	1½	Petoski (GB)	4	Willie Carson	Dick Hern (GB)	14/1
7		Supreme Leader (GB)	4	Tony Murray	Clive Brittain (GB)	150/1
8		Vouchsafe (IRE)	4	Brian Proctor	Dick Hern (GB)	1000/1
9		Boldden (GB)	4	Paul Cook	Dick Hern (GB)	1000/1

- Abbreviations: nse = nose; nk = neck; shd = head; hd = head; dist = distance; UR = unseated rider

== Winner's details ==
Further details of the winner, Dancing Brave

- Sex: Colt
- Foaled: 11 May 1983
- Country: United States
- Sire: Lyphard; Dam: Navajo Princess (Drone)
- Owner: Khalid Abdullah
- Breeder: Glen Oak Farm
