= Darara =

Irish-bred Thoroughbred racehorse

- Sire: Top Ville
- Grandsire: High Top
- Dam: Delsy
- Damsire: Abdos
- Sex: Mare
- Foaled: 11 May 1983
- Country: Ireland
- Colour: Bay
- Breeder: Aga Khan IV
- Owner: Aga Khan IV
- Trainer: Alain de Royer-Dupré
- Record: 6:3-1-0

Major wins
- Prix de Psyché (1986); Prix Vermeille (1986)

Awards
- Top-rated European three-year-old filly, 11 furlongs plus (1986); Timeform top-rated three-year-old filly (1986); Timeform rating: 129 in 1986

Darara (11 May 1983 – June 2012) was an Irish-bred, French-trained Thoroughbred racehorse and broodmare. Her racing career was restricted to six races between June and November 1983 and included three wins including the Prix Vermeille and Prix de Psyché. She went on to finish sixth behind Dancing Brave in France's most important race, the Prix de l'Arc de Triomphe and was one of the highest-rated fillies of her generation in Europe. She was then retired to stud and became a highly successful producer of winners.

== Background ==
Darara was a small, lightly built bay mare with a faint white star and a white sock on her left hind leg bred in Ireland by her owner the Aga Khan IV. Her sire Top Ville was also an Irish-bred, French-trained horse which won the Prix du Jockey Club in 1979. At stud he also sired Toulon, winner of the St Leger Stakes, Pistolet Bleu (Grand Prix de Saint-Cloud), Saint Estephe (Coronation Cup) and Shardari. Her dam Delsy also produced Darshaan, who won the 1984 Prix du Jockey Club and went on to become a leading sire. The filly was sent into training with Alain de Royer-Dupré at Chantilly and usually raced in a sheepskin noseband.

== Racing career ==
Darara's small size and delicate constitution made her difficult to train and she did not appear on a racecourse until June 1986, when she won the Prix Albaraelle, a maiden race over 2000 metres at Saint-Cloud Racecourse. She then finished second in a Listed race at Evry Racecourse before being moved up in class to contest the Group Three Prix de Psyché at Deauville in August. Ridden by Yves Saint-Martin, she won by one and a half lengths from the British-trained Cocotte.

In September, Darara was moved up to Group One class for the Prix Vermeille over 2400 metres at Longchamp Racecourse. The Prix de Diane winner Lacovia was made the odds-on favourite, with Darara third in the betting on 3.8/1. Saint-Martin sent the filly into the lead in the straight and she accelerated clear of her seven opponents to win easily by five lengths from Reloy. Following his filly's success, the Aga Khan opted to pay a 250,000 supplementary fee to enter the filly in the Prix de l'Arc de Triomphe. The Aga Khan's four-horse entry for the race on 5 October, comprising Darara, Shardari, Shahrastani and the pacemaker Dihistan, started at combined odds of 9/2 in an exceptionally strong field which included Dancing Brave, Bering, Acatenango and Triptych. Darara was among the leaders in the straight, but weakened in the closing stages to finish sixth of the fifteen runners, four lengths behind the winner Dancing Brave. On her final appearance, Darara was sent to California to contest the Breeders' Cup Turf at Santa Anita Park on 1 November. She was never is serious contention and finished eighth of the nine runners behind Manila.

== Assessment ==
In 1986, the independent Timeform organisation awarded Darara a rating of 129, placing her alongside the one-mile specialist Sonic Lady as the best three-year-old filly in Europe. In the International Classification, it rated her the best three-year-old filly over 11 furlongs plus with a rating of 126.

== Stud record ==
Darara was retired from racing to become a broodmare at her owners stud. In 1994 Darara was offered for sale and bought for 470,000 Irish guineas on behalf of Lord and Lady Lloyd Webber and was moved to the Watership Down Stud in Berkshire. Darara failed to produce a foal for several years after moving to Berkshire but recovered her fertility after a pioneering procedure involving the "flushing" of her fallopian tubes.

She was a highly successful broodmare, producing four winners of Group One flat races and one Grade I winning steeplechaser. Her offspring included:

- Dariyoun a bay colt, foaled in 1988, sired by Shahrastani, won four races including the Gran Premio de Madrid
- Dardjini bay colt 1990, by Nijinsky won six races including the Denny Gold Medal Chase
- Darazari, bay colt 1993 by Sadler's Wells won two races in Europe including the Prix Maurice de Nieuil before being exported to Australia where he won the Ranvet Stakes.
- Kilimanjaro, bay colt 1995 by Shirley Heights won one race.
- Rhagaas, bay colt 1996 by Sadler's Wells, won one race
- River Dancer, bay colt 1999 by Sadler's Wells, won three races including the Prix La Force in France and the Queen Elizabeth II Cup in Hong Kong.
- Dar Re Mi, bay filly 2005 by Singspiel, won six races including the Prix Minerve, Pretty Polly Stakes, Yorkshire Oaks, Sheema Classic
- Rewilding, bay colt 2007 by Tiger Hill, won five races including the Cocked Hat Stakes, Great Voltigeur Stakes, Sheema Classic, Prince of Wales's Stakes

Darara was retired from breeding after foaling Rewilding in 2007 and died in June 2012 at the age of twenty-nine.

== Pedigree ==
Pedigree of Darara (IRE), bay mare, 1983
| Sire Top Ville (IRE) 1976 | High Top (IRE); 1969 | Derring-Do | Darius |
| Sire Top Ville (IRE) 1976 | High Top (IRE); 1969 | Derring-Do | Sipsey Bridge |
| Sire Top Ville (IRE) 1976 | High Top (IRE); 1969 | Camenae | Vimy |
| Sire Top Ville (IRE) 1976 | High Top (IRE); 1969 | Camenae | Madrilene |
| Sire Top Ville (IRE) 1976 | Sega Ville (FR); 1968 | Charlottesville | Prince Chevalier |
| Sire Top Ville (IRE) 1976 | Sega Ville (FR); 1968 | Charlottesville | Noorani |
| Sire Top Ville (IRE) 1976 | Sega Ville (FR); 1968 | La Sega | Tantieme |
| Sire Top Ville (IRE) 1976 | Sega Ville (FR); 1968 | La Sega | La Danse |
| Dam Delsy (FR) 1972 | Abdos (FR); 1959 | Arbar | Djebel |
| Dam Delsy (FR) 1972 | Abdos (FR); 1959 | Arbar | Astronomie |
| Dam Delsy (FR) 1972 | Abdos (FR); 1959 | Pretty Lady | Umidwar |
| Dam Delsy (FR) 1972 | Abdos (FR); 1959 | Pretty Lady | La Moqueuse |
| Dam Delsy (FR) 1972 | Kelty (FR); 1965 | Venture | Relic |
| Dam Delsy (FR) 1972 | Kelty (FR); 1965 | Venture | Rose O' Lynn |
| Dam Delsy (FR) 1972 | Kelty (FR); 1965 | Marilla | Marsyas |
| Dam Delsy (FR) 1972 | Kelty (FR); 1965 | Marilla | Albanilla (Family: 13-c) |
