= Too Darn Hot (horse) =

Thoroughbred racehorse

- Racing silks of Lord Lloyd-Webber
- Sire: Dubawi
- Dam: Dar Re Mi
- Sex: Colt
- Foaled: 27 March 2016
- Country: United Kingdom
- Colour: Bay
- Breeder: Watership Down Stud
- Owner: Andrew Lloyd Webber
- Trainer: John Gosden
- Record: 9: 6-2-1
- Earnings: £1,320,181

Major wins
- Solario Stakes (2018); Champagne Stakes (2018); Dewhurst Stakes (2018); Prix Jean Prat (2019); Sussex Stakes (2019)

Awards
- Cartier Champion Two-year-old Colt (2018); Top-rated European 2-y-o (2018); Cartier Champion Three-year-old Colt (2019)

Too Darn Hot (foaled 27 March 2016) is a British Thoroughbred racehorse. In a short racing career lasting less than a year he ran nine times and won six of his races, including three at the highest Group 1 level. As a two-year-old in 2018 he was rated the best of his generation in Europe, winning the Solario Stakes, Champagne Stakes and the Dewhurst Stakes. He was beaten when favourite or joint-favourite in his first three races in 2019 but returned to form when winning the Prix Jean Prat and Sussex Stakes in the summer. His career was ended by an injury sustained during his final race.

== Background ==
Too Darn Hot was bred in England by his owner, Andrew Lloyd Webber's Watership Down Stud. Lloyd Webber later explained that although the stud usually puts its colts up for auction, Too Darn Hot had suffered an injury as a foal and was thought unlikely to find a buyer. The colt was sent into training with John Gosden in Newmarket, Suffolk.

He was sired by Dubawi a son of Dubai Millennium, whose wins included the Irish 2,000 Guineas and the Prix Jacques Le Marois. At stud, Dubawi has been a successful breeding stallion, siring major winners such as Monterosso, Al Kazeem, Makfi, Lucky Nine and Night of Thunder. Too Darn Hot's dam Dar Re Mi was an outstanding racemare whose wins included the Pretty Polly Stakes, Yorkshire Oaks and Sheema Classic. Her other foals have included So Mi Dar (Musidora Stakes) and La Ti Dar (runner-up in the St Leger). Dar Re Mi was a daughter of Darara who won the Prix Vermeille and was a half sister to Darshaan.

== Racing career ==
=== 2018: two-year-old season ===
In all of his starts as a juvenile in 2018 Too Darn Hot was ridden by Frankie Dettori. The colt made his debut in a maiden race over one mile at Sandown Park on 9 August and was made the 8/11 favourite against four opponents. After disputing the lead from the start he drew away from his rivals in the last quarter mile and won by seven lengths from Rowland Ward. On 1 September the colt was stepped up in class for the Group 3 Solario Stakes over seven furlongs at the same track. He was made the even money favourite in a six-runner field which included Arthur Kitt (winner of the Chesham Stakes), Dunkerron (runner-up in the Vintage Stakes) and Watan (runner-up in the Acomb Stakes). After racing in third place, Too Darn Hot took the lead approaching the final furlong and "powered clear" to win by four lengths from Arthur Kitt. After the race Dettori said "I gave him as much experience as I could. I gave him a couple of flicks and he has put a very good field to bed in impressive fashion. He's got options. We know he can stay a mile but he also showed speed over seven today, he had the race won by the furlong-and-a-half. He's pretty special".

Two weeks after his win in the Solario, Too Darn Hot moved up to Group 2 class for the Champagne Stakes over seven furlong at Doncaster Racecourse and was made the 4/11 favourite. The best of his five opponents appeared to be Dark Vision (Vintage Stakes), Phoenix of Spain (Acomb Stakes) and Van Beethoven (Railway Stakes). After tracking the leaders Too Darn Hot took the lead a furlong out and won by 1 3/4 lengths from Phoenix of Spain. Dettori commented "What he did between the three-furlong pole and furlong pole was pretty amazing. He made six lengths in two furlongs – pretty special. Today is his first time on a flat track and he gave me a really good feel, he went through the gears".

On his final run of the year Too Darn Hot started the even money favourite for the Group 1 Dewhurst Stakes over seven furlongs at Newmarket Racecourse. The other six runners were Anthony Van Dyck (Futurity Stakes), Advertise, Sangarius (Flying Scotsman Stakes), Mohawk (Royal Lodge Stakes), Christmas (Caravaggio Stakes) and Kuwait Currency (Stonehenge Stakes). After racing in mid-division as Christmas set the pace, Too Darn Hot was angled right to make his challenge in the last quarter mile. He took the inside the final furlong and won "very readily" by 2 3/4 lengths from Advertise. Dettori, who was winning the race for the first time at the age of 47 said "He's an amazing horse and in the end I was struggling to ease him down. He's had three easy races and today he was getting knocked about and running in snatches. For a minute I thought I was in trouble and then the turbo kicked in. He's up with the best I've ridden – he's got a good cruising speed and he moves his legs really fast".

At the 2018 Cartier Awards, Too Darn Hot was named Champion Two-year-old Colt. In the official ratings for two-year-olds he was rated the best juvenile of the year, five pounds superior to his nearest rival Quorto.

=== 2019: three-year-old season ===
Throughout the winter and the spring of 2019 Too Darn Hot was the ante-post favourite for the 2000 Guineas. He was expected to begin his season in the Greenham Stakes but was withdrawn from the race after developing a splint in training. Although the condition improved Gosden decided that the lost time made it impossible to bring the horse to peak form for the Guineas and ruled him out of the race. The colt eventually returned to the track in the Dante Stakes (a trial race for the Epsom Derby) over 10 1/2 furlongs at York Racecourse on 16 May in which started favourite but sustained his first defeat as he was beaten a length into second place by Telecaster. Nine days later he was dropped back in distance for the Irish 2,000 Guineas over one mile at the Curragh and was made the 6/4 joint favourite alongside the 2000 Guineas winner Magna Grecia. After racing in mid-division he made good progress in the straight but was unable to trouble the front-running Phoenix of Spain and was beaten three lengths into second place. At Royal Ascot on 18 June Too Darn Hot started 2/1 favourite against ten opponents for the St James's Palace Stakes. He produced a strong late challenge, but, in a closely contested finish he was beaten a neck and three quarters of a length by Circus Maximus and King of Comedy.

On 7 July Too Darn Hot was sent to France and dropped back in distance for the Group 1 Prix Jean Prat over 1400 metres at Deauville Racecourse. He started the odds on favourite with the best-fancied of his eleven opponents being Space Blues, Graignes and Munitions (Prix Djebel). Dettori settled the colt just behind the leaders before going to the front 300 metres from the finish and Too Darn Hot pulled clear of his rivals to win "comfortably" by three lengths. After the race Gosden said "His proper distance is 1400 metres up to an easy mile and we'll play to his strengths rather than stupidly playing to his weaknesses. He's not a stamina horse, he's built like a sprinter. I probably should have been running him in the July Cup next week", while Dettori commented "he's blessed with so much speed. We tried to stretch him and every time he ran, he didn't finish his races off. Ireland was too soon, then Ascot is a really stiff mile, so today, he put everything to bed and he showed his old turn of foot".

The Sussex Stakes at Goodwood Racecourse on 31 July saw Too Darn Hot matched again older horses for the first time and he started favourite in an eight-runner field. Circus Maximus and Phoenix of Spain were again in opposition while the senior contenders were Lord Glitters, Zabeel Prince, Accidental Agent and the filly I Can Fly. The favourite was settled in third place by Dettori as Phoenix of Spain set the pace from Circus Maximus. The St James's Palace Stakes winner took the lead in the straight but Too Darn Hot was switched left, gained the advantage a furlong out and won by half a length. Dettori said "I got him to settle and he showed what he can do. He's finally got a proper Group 1 in this country and he's back to where his reputation should be. John had said don't panic and wait... I managed to pull him out and he was full of running. I passed [Circus Maximus] with ease; he put up a bit of a fight but we got to the line well... the Breeders' Cup Mile could be ideal".

Less than a week after his win at Goodwood it was announced that Too Darn Hot had sustained a hairline fracture to his right hind cannon bone and would be retired from racing.

== Stud career ==
After his retirement from racing, Too Darn Hot became a breeding stallion at the Dalham Hall Stud for a fee of €45,000, with his first foals born in January 2021.

Due to the success of multiple Group 1 winning colt Broadsiding, Darley has decided to significantly increase his Australian fee to AU$110,000 (US$71,000) in 2024, more than double his fee of AU$44,000, which he stood for in his first four seasons in the Hunter Valley.

=== Notable progeny ===
c = colt, f = filly, g = gelding

Foaled	Name	Dam	Sex	Major wins
2021	Fallen Angel	Agnes Stewart	f	Moyglare Stud Stakes, Irish 1,000 Guineas, Prix Rothschild, Matron Stakes
2021	Broadsiding	Speedway	c	ATC Champagne Stakes, J.J. Atkins, Golden Rose Stakes, Rosehill Guineas
2021	Tropicus	Extensible	c	Oakleigh Plate
2021	Native Approach	Sperry	g	Al Quoz Sprint
2022	Hotazhell	Azenzar	c	Futurity Trophy, Bayerisches Zuchtrennen, Irish Champion Stakes
2022	Tornado Alert	Bint Almatar	c	Bayerisches Zuchtrennen
2023	Title Role	Valiant Girl	c	Belmont Derby
2023	Glacius	Predawn	c	Saratoga Derby
2023	Soreanga	Saltita	f	Preis der Diana

== Pedigree ==
Pedigree of Too Darn Hot (GB), bay colt, 2016
Sire Dubawi (IRE) 2002	Dubai Millennium (GB); 1996	Seeking the Gold (USA)	Mr. Prospector
Sire Dubawi (IRE) 2002	Dubai Millennium (GB); 1996	Seeking the Gold (USA)	Con Game
Sire Dubawi (IRE) 2002	Dubai Millennium (GB); 1996	Colorado Dancer (IRE)	Shareef Dancer (USA)
Sire Dubawi (IRE) 2002	Dubai Millennium (GB); 1996	Colorado Dancer (IRE)	Fall Aspen (USA)
Sire Dubawi (IRE) 2002	Zomaradah (GB); 1995	Deploy	Shirley Heights
Sire Dubawi (IRE) 2002	Zomaradah (GB); 1995	Deploy	Slightly Dangerous (USA)
Sire Dubawi (IRE) 2002	Zomaradah (GB); 1995	Jawaher (IRE)	Dancing Brave (USA)
Sire Dubawi (IRE) 2002	Zomaradah (GB); 1995	Jawaher (IRE)	High Tern
Dam Dar Re Mi (GB) 2005	Singspiel (IRE); 1992	In The Wings (GB)	Sadler's Wells (USA)
Dam Dar Re Mi (GB) 2005	Singspiel (IRE); 1992	In The Wings (GB)	High Hawk (IRE)
Dam Dar Re Mi (GB) 2005	Singspiel (IRE); 1992	Glorious Song (CAN)	Halo (USA)
Dam Dar Re Mi (GB) 2005	Singspiel (IRE); 1992	Glorious Song (CAN)	Ballade (USA)
Dam Dar Re Mi (GB) 2005	Darara (GB); 1983	Top Ville (IRE)	High Top
Dam Dar Re Mi (GB) 2005	Darara (GB); 1983	Top Ville (IRE)	Sega Ville (FR)
Dam Dar Re Mi (GB) 2005	Darara (GB); 1983	Delsy (FR)	Abdos
Dam Dar Re Mi (GB) 2005	Darara (GB); 1983	Delsy (FR)	Kelty (Family 13-c)
