= Top Ville =

Thoroughbred racehorse

- Sire: High Top
- Grandsire: Derring-Do
- Dam: Sega Ville
- Damsire: Charlottesville
- Sex: Stallion
- Foaled: 5 April 1976
- Country: Ireland
- Colour: Bay
- Breeder: Aga Khan IV
- Owner: Aga Khan IV
- Trainer: François Mathet
- Record: 10:6-1-1

Major wins
- Prix Saint-Roman (1978); Prix de Condé (1978); Prix de Guiche (1979); Prix Lupin (1979); Prix du Jockey Club (1979)

Awards
- Timeform rating 120 (1978), 129 (1979)

Top Ville (5 April 1976 – November 13, 1998) was an Irish-bred, French-trained Thoroughbred racehorse and sire. In the autumn of 1978, the colt established himself as one of the leading two-year-old colts in France with wins in the Prix Saint-Roman, Prix de Condé. In the following year, he took his winning run to six with victories in the Prix de Guiche, Prix Lupin and Prix du Jockey Club, beating top-class opponents including Irish River and Le Marmot. He was beaten in his two remaining races and was retired to stud, where he became a successful and influential breeding stallion.

== Background ==
Top Ville was a dark-coated bay horse with a white star and a white sock on his left hind leg bred in Ireland by his owner Aga Khan IV. He was sired by High Top, who won the 2000 Guineas in 1972 and later became a successful breeding stallion. High Top's other progeny included the Oaks Stakes winner Circus Plume and the St Leger winner Cut Above. Top Ville's dam, Sega Ville who was bred and owned by the widow of François Dupré, was a successful racehorse who won the Prix de Flore in 1971, and a daughter of the outstanding racemare La Sega, who won the Poule d'Essai des Pouliches and the Prix de Diane in 1962. Top Ville was her second foal. Top Ville was trained by the veteran François Mathet at Chantilly. Mathet had trained many of the best French racehorses of the 20th century including Tantieme, Relko, and Reliance.

== Racing career ==
=== 1978: two-year-old season ===
In his first two races, Top Ville finished third in the Prix de Grisy over 1200 metres and second in the Prix de Saint-Maximin over 1400m. The colt was then moved up in distance and recorded his first success in a maiden race over 1600m at Chantilly Racecourse in September. Later in the month, he was moved up in class and distance for the Group Three Prix Saint-Roman over 1800m at Longchamp Racecourse. Ridden by Henri Samani, the colt raced in second place before taking the lead in the straight and winning by two lengths from the odds-on favourite Polynikis. On 22 October, Top Ville started the 2/5 favourite for the Group Three Prix de Condé over 2000m at Longchamp. He took the lead in the straight and drew clear of the field to win by four lengths from Look Fast and Dear Henry.

=== 1979: three-year-old season ===
In 1979, Yves Saint-Martin took over from Henri Samani as Top Ville's regular jockey. The colt made his first appearance of the season in the Prix de Guiche over 1950m on soft ground at Longchamp on 16 April. Starting the 2/5 favourite, he took the lead soon after the start and held off the late challenge of Bellypha to win by half a length with Look Fast four lengths back in third. On 13 May, Top Ville ran in the Prix Lupin over 2100m at Longchamp in which he was matched against Irish River, the top-rated French colt of 1978 and the winner of four Group One races. Top Ville raced just behind his pacemaker Silver Do before moving up on the inside rail and taking the lead approaching the last 200m. He was challenged by Sharpman and Irish River but stayed on strongly and was beginning to draw away from his rivals at the finish, winning by a length from Sharpman, with Irish River three quarters of a length away in third. The winning time of 2:09.3 was a new record for the race.

Top Ville started the 13/10 favourite in a field of eleven colts for the Prix du Jockey Club at Chantilly on 3 June. He was opposed by a strong field which included Sharpman and his reportedly superior stable companion Le Marmot as well as Bellypha and High Sierra, winner of the Prix Noailles. Top Ville demonstrated what Timeform described as "tremendous power" to take the lead in the straight and open up a decisive advantage before holding off the late run of Le Marmot to win by a length, with Sharpman five lengths back in third and Bellypha in fourth. For the second time in succession, Top Ville set a new race record, covering the 2400m distance in a time of 2:25.2.

After a break of three months, Top Ville returned on 9 September for the Prix Niel over 2400m at Longchamp in September. He was made the 2/5 favourite (coupled with his stable companion Kamaridaan) despite carrying top weight but finished fourth of the six runners behind Le Marmot. On 7 October, Top Ville (and Kamaridaan) started the 23/4 second favourite for the 58th running of the Prix de l'Arc de Triomphe. He was never in contention and finished seventeenth of the twenty-two runners behind Three Troikas. Saint-Martin reported that Top Ville had been disconcerted by the noise of the crowd.

== Assessment ==
In 1978, Top Ville was given a rating of 120 by the independent Timeform organisation, fourteen pounds behind their top-rated two-year-old Tromos. In the inaugural International Classification, a collaboration between the official handicappers of France, Ireland and the United Kingdom, Top Ville was rated nine pounds below Tromos and was the equal-third best French-trained two-year-old colt behind Irish River and Bellypha. In 1979, he was rated 129 by Timeform, eight pounds behind their leading three-year-old colt, Troy. In the International Classification, he was rated the third-best three-year-old colt in Europe and the fifth best horse of any age, behind Three Troikas, Troy, Ile de Bourbon and Le Marmot.

== Stud record ==
Top Ville was syndicated with a value of £3 million to become a breeding stallion at the Aga Khan's Haras de Bonneval in Normandy. He also stood at the Dalham Hall Stud in England before returning to Normandy. He was retired from stud duty in 1994.

Top Ville was a sire of several major winners including:

- Princess Pati, 1981, won Irish Oaks
- Shardari, 1982, won International Stakes
- Saint Estephe, 1982, won Coronation Cup
- Darara, 1983, won Prix Vermeille
- Un Desperado, 1983, won Prix Eugène Adam, sire of Best Mate
- Top Sunrise, 1985, won Prix Royal Oak
- Pistolet Bleu, 1988, won Critérium de Saint-Cloud, Grand Prix de Saint-Cloud
- Toulon, 1988, won St Leger Stakes

Top Ville was also the damsire of Montjeu, Ameerat, Belmez, Winged Love (Irish Derby), Caerlina (Prix de Diane), Egyptband (Prix de Diane), Yeats, and Dar Re Mi.

== Pedigree ==
Pedigree of Top Ville (IRE), bay stallion, 1976
Sire High Top (IRE) 1969	Derring-Do (GB); 1961	Darius	Dante
Sire High Top (IRE) 1969	Derring-Do (GB); 1961	Darius	Yasna
Sire High Top (IRE) 1969	Derring-Do (GB); 1961	Sipsey Bridge	Abernant
Sire High Top (IRE) 1969	Derring-Do (GB); 1961	Sipsey Bridge	Claudette
Sire High Top (IRE) 1969	Camenae (GB); 1961	Vimy	Wild Risk
Sire High Top (IRE) 1969	Camenae (GB); 1961	Vimy	Mimi
Sire High Top (IRE) 1969	Camenae (GB); 1961	Madrilene	Court Martial
Sire High Top (IRE) 1969	Camenae (GB); 1961	Madrilene	Marmite
Dam Sega Ville (FR) 1968	Charlottesville (GB); 1957	Prince Chevalier	Prince Rose
Dam Sega Ville (FR) 1968	Charlottesville (GB); 1957	Prince Chevalier	Chevalerie
Dam Sega Ville (FR) 1968	Charlottesville (GB); 1957	Noorani	Nearco
Dam Sega Ville (FR) 1968	Charlottesville (GB); 1957	Noorani	Empire Glory
Dam Sega Ville (FR) 1968	La Sega (FR); 1959	Tantieme	Deux-Pour-Cent
Dam Sega Ville (FR) 1968	La Sega (FR); 1959	Tantieme	Terka
Dam Sega Ville (FR) 1968	La Sega (FR); 1959	La Danse	Menetrier
Dam Sega Ville (FR) 1968	La Sega (FR); 1959	La Danse	Makada (Family: 8-i)
