= Broadsiding (horse) =

Australian bred thoroughbred racehorse

- Racing Silks of Godolphin
- Sire: Too Darn Hot
- Grandsire: Dubawi
- Dam: Speedway
- Damsire: Street Cry
- Sex: Colt
- Foaled: 2 October 2021
- Country: Australia
- Colour: Bay
- Breeder: Godolphin
- Owner: Godolphin
- Trainer: James Cummings
- Jockey: James McDonald
- Record: 15: 7-1-3
- Earnings: A$3,923,975

Major wins
- Champagne Stakes (2024); BRC Sires' Produce Stakes (2024); J. J. Atkins (2024); Golden Rose Stakes (2024); Hobartville Stakes (2025); Rosehill Guineas (2025)

Awards
- Australian Champion Two Year Old (2023/24); Australian Champion Three Year Old Colt/Gelding (2024/25)

Broadsiding (foaled 2 October 2021) is a multiple Group 1 winning Australian bred Thoroughbred racehorse.

== Background ==
Broadsiding is bred from Dubawi’s son Too Darn Hot, who was the British Champion 2YO Colt and also won two more Group I races aged 3, he also never missed a place in his nine career starts.

== Racing career ==
Broadsiding is a three time Group 1 winner, having won twice at this level as a 2-year-old in the Champagne Stakes and the J. J. Atkins.

At his first run as a 3-year-old, Broadsiding was successful in the Golden Rose Stakes at Rosehill Racecourse. After the win jockey James McDonald heaped praise on the horse stating “He’s got way more ability than we can ever imagine, he’s just a cool dude”

== Pedigree ==
Pedigree of Broadsiding (AUS) 2021
Sire Too Darn Hot (GB) 2016	Dubawi (IRE); 2002	Dubai Millennium	Seeking The Gold
Sire Too Darn Hot (GB) 2016	Dubawi (IRE); 2002	Dubai Millennium	Colorado Dancer
Sire Too Darn Hot (GB) 2016	Dubawi (IRE); 2002	Zomaradah	Deploy
Sire Too Darn Hot (GB) 2016	Dubawi (IRE); 2002	Zomaradah	Jawaher
Sire Too Darn Hot (GB) 2016	Dar Re Mi (GB); 2005	Singspiel	In the Wings
Sire Too Darn Hot (GB) 2016	Dar Re Mi (GB); 2005	Singspiel	Glorious Song
Sire Too Darn Hot (GB) 2016	Dar Re Mi (GB); 2005	Darara	Top Ville
Sire Too Darn Hot (GB) 2016	Dar Re Mi (GB); 2005	Darara	Delsy
Dam Speedway (AUS) 2014	Street Cry (IRE); 1998	Machiavellian	Mr. Prospector
Dam Speedway (AUS) 2014	Street Cry (IRE); 1998	Machiavellian	Coup de Folie
Dam Speedway (AUS) 2014	Street Cry (IRE); 1998	Helen Street	Troy
Dam Speedway (AUS) 2014	Street Cry (IRE); 1998	Helen Street	Waterway
Dam Speedway (AUS) 2014	Glissade (AUS); 2008	Redoute's Choice	Danehill
Dam Speedway (AUS) 2014	Glissade (AUS); 2008	Redoute's Choice	Shantha's Choice
Dam Speedway (AUS) 2014	Glissade (AUS); 2008	Steflara	Zabeel
Dam Speedway (AUS) 2014	Glissade (AUS); 2008	Steflara	Blue Storm
