= Quorto =

Irish-bred Thoroughbred racehorse

- Sire: Dubawi
- Grandsire: Dubai Millennium
- Dam: Volume
- Damsire: Mount Nelson
- Sex: Colt
- Foaled: 29 February 2016
- Country: Ireland
- Colour: Bay
- Breeder: Godolphin
- Owner: Godolphin
- Trainer: Charlie Appleby
- Record: 3: 3-0-0
- Earnings: £227,092

Major wins
- Superlative Stakes (2018); National Stakes (2018)

Awards
- Top-rated 2-y-o in Ireland (2018)

Quorto (29 February 2016 – 9 July 2020) was an Irish-bred British-trained Thoroughbred racehorse. He was one of the best two-year-olds in Europe in 2018 when he was unbeaten in three races including the Superlative Stakes and the National Stakes. Injuries prevented him from running as a three-year-old in 2019 and he suffered a fatal injury when being trained for his reappearance in 2020.

== Background ==
Quorto was a bay colt with a white star bred by Sheikh Mohammed's Godolphin organisation. He was sent into training with Charlie Appleby at Godolphin's British base in Newmarket, Suffolk.

He was sired by Dubawi a son of Dubai Millennium, whose wins included the Irish 2,000 Guineas and the Prix Jacques Le Marois. At stud, Dubawi has been a successful breeding stallion, siring winners such as Monterosso, Al Kazeem, Makfi, Lucky Nine and Night of Thunder. Quorto's dam Volume was a high-class performer who won the Fillies' Trial Stakes and finished third in both the Epsom Oaks and the Irish Oaks. At the end of her racing career she was auctioned at Tattersalls in December 2014 and bought for 700,000 guineas by John Ferguson Bloodstock on behalf of Godolphin. She was a granddaughter of the mare Victoire Bleue, who won the Prix du Cadran and Prix Gladiateur. Victoire Bleue was in turn a granddaughter of Virunga who ran third to Allez France and Dahlia in the Prix de Diane and was a half-sister to Vitiges.

== Racing career ==
=== 2018: two-year-old season ===
On his track debut, Quorto started at odds of 9/4 for a minor race over six furlongs at Newmarket Racecourse on 22 June. Ridden by James Doyle he took the lead approaching the final furlong and won by two and three quarter lengths from the John Gosden-trained filly Handmaiden. William Buick took the ride when the colt was stepped up in class for the Group 2 Superlative Stakes over seven furlongs the same course and three weeks later and started the 5/4 favourite. After racing in second place behind the Irish challenger Cape of Good Hope for most of the way he went to the front a furlong out and went clear of his six opponents to win "very readily" by three and three quarter lengths. After the race Charlie Appleby commented "We were confident coming here today that he had come forward and that the step up in trip was going to suit. He has shown some gears there. William got off and said he has a great racing mind. He is an exciting horse, for sure".

In September, Quorto was sent to Ireland to contest the Group 1 National Stakes over seven furlongs at the Curragh in which he was again partnered by Buick. He was made the 11/8 favourite ahead of Anthony Van Dyck in a seven-runner field which also included Land Force (Richmond Stakes) and Christmas (Caravaggio Stakes). He raced in third place behind Christmas and Anthony Van Dyck before taking the lead a furlong out and kept on well to win by one and a quarter lengths. He appeared to lean into the runner-up Anthony Van Dyck in the closing stages but after a stewards' inquiry the result was allowed to stand. Appleby said "He's a typical Dubawi. From the Superlative Stakes to here, he needed all of that time and he had a spell where he went a bit quiet on us, but that's typical of a Dubawi... we were all confident coming into today".

In the official ratings for Irish-raced juveniles for 2018 Quorto was given a mark of 121, making him the best two-year-old of the year. He was rated the second best two-year-old in Europe behind Too Darn Hot

== Death ==
Quorto missed the whole of the 2019 season owing to injury but was expected to return to the track as a four-year-old in 2020. In July 2020 it was reported that the colt had been fatally injured in a training gallop. Appleby commented "Quorto was a very talented colt who was absolutely brilliant when winning the National Stakes. It is a great shame that we did not get to see him on the racecourse again and he will be sorely missed".

== Pedigree ==
Pedigree of Quorto (IRE), bay colt, 2016
Sire Dubawi (IRE) 2002	Dubai Millennium (GB); 1996	Seeking the Gold (USA)	Mr. Prospector
Sire Dubawi (IRE) 2002	Dubai Millennium (GB); 1996	Seeking the Gold (USA)	Con Game
Sire Dubawi (IRE) 2002	Dubai Millennium (GB); 1996	Colorado Dancer (IRE)	Shareef Dancer (USA)
Sire Dubawi (IRE) 2002	Dubai Millennium (GB); 1996	Colorado Dancer (IRE)	Fall Aspen (USA)
Sire Dubawi (IRE) 2002	Zomaradah (GB); 1995	Deploy	Shirley Heights
Sire Dubawi (IRE) 2002	Zomaradah (GB); 1995	Deploy	Slightly Dangerous (USA)
Sire Dubawi (IRE) 2002	Zomaradah (GB); 1995	Jawaher (IRE)	Dancing Brave (USA)
Sire Dubawi (IRE) 2002	Zomaradah (GB); 1995	Jawaher (IRE)	High Tern
Dam Volume (GB) 2011	Mount Nelson (GB); 2004	Rock of Gibraltar (IRE)	Danehill (USA)
Dam Volume (GB) 2011	Mount Nelson (GB); 2004	Rock of Gibraltar (IRE)	Offshore Boom
Dam Volume (GB) 2011	Mount Nelson (GB); 2004	Independence	Selkirk (USA)
Dam Volume (GB) 2011	Mount Nelson (GB); 2004	Independence	Yukon Hope (USA)
Dam Volume (GB) 2011	Victoire Finale (GB); 2000	Peintre Celebre (USA)	Nureyev
Dam Volume (GB) 2011	Victoire Finale (GB); 2000	Peintre Celebre (USA)	Peinture Bleue
Dam Volume (GB) 2011	Victoire Finale (GB); 2000	Victoire Bleue (FR)	Legend of France (USA)
Dam Volume (GB) 2011	Victoire Finale (GB); 2000	Victoire Bleue (FR)	Vosges (USA) (Family 19-b)
