= Circus Plume =

British Thoroughbred racehorse

- Racing silks of Sir Robin McAlpine
- Sire: High Top
- Grandsire: Derring-Do
- Dam: Golden Fez
- Damsire: Aureole
- Sex: Mare
- Foaled: 17 April 1981
- Country: United Kingdom
- Colour: Bay
- Breeder: Mrs C Drake
- Owner: Sir Robin McAlpine
- Trainer: John Dunlop
- Record: 10: 4-2-2

Major wins
- Epsom Oaks (1984); Yorkshire Oaks (1984)

Awards
- Timeform rating 124

Circus Plume (1981–1996) was a British Thoroughbred racehorse and broodmare best known for winning the classic Oaks Stakes in 1984. After winning once from three starts in 1983, Circus Plume improved to become one of the best staying fillies in Europe as a three-year-old, winning the Oaks and the Yorkshire Oaks as well as finishing second in the Irish Oaks and the Prix Vermeille. She failed to show any worthwhile form in 1985 and was retired to stud, where she had some success as a broodmare.

== Background ==
Circus Plume was a bay mare with three white feet bred by Mrs C Drake. She was sired by High Top, who won the 2000 Guineas in 1972 and later became a successful breeding stallion. His other progeny included the St Leger Stakes winner Cut Above and the Prix du Jockey Club winner Top Ville. Circus Plume's dam, Golden Fez, was a daughter of Zabara, who won the 1000 Guineas in 1952 and went on to become a successful broodmare. Zabara's other descendants included Mtoto and the Prix du Jockey Club winner Blue Canari. Golden Fez was sold by her owner and breeder Sir Robin McAlpine in 1977, but when her daughter was offered for sale as a foal in December 1981, McAlpine bought Circus Plume for 98,000 guineas. The filly was subsequently sent into training with John Dunlop at Arundel, West Sussex.

== Racing career ==
=== 1983: two-year-old season ===
Circus Plume finished third on her debut and then contested a seven furlong maiden race at Salisbury Racecourse in September. She took the lead two furlongs from the finish and won by three lengths from eighteen opponents. The filly was then moved up in class and distance for the Group Three Fillies' Mile over one mile at Ascot Racecourse in which she finished third to Nepula.

=== 1984: three-year-old season ===
On her first appearance as a three-year-old Circus Plume ran in the Sir Charles Clore Memorial Stakes over ten furlongs at Newbury Racecourse in May. She was always well-placed, took the lead approaching the final furlong and won by one and a half lengths from Leipzig and Ballinderry.

In June Circus Plume was one of sixteen fillies to contest the 206th running of the Oaks at Epsom Downs Racecourse. Ridden by Lester Piggott, she started at odds of 4/1 with the American-bred Optimistic Lass being made favourite after her win in the Musidora Stakes. 1984 was the first year of sponsorship in the British classics and the race was officially known as the Gold Seal Oaks as a result of support from the British Ever Ready Electrical Company. The race produced a dramatic finish, with Circus Plume prevailing by a neck from the 66/1 outsider Media Luna with Out of Shot finishing third after veering to the left in the closing stages and hampering several other runners. Out of Shot was disqualified after a stewards' enquiry. Circus Plume's victory enabled Piggott to draw level with Frank Buckle as the winners of twenty-seven classics.

In her next race, Circus Plume ran in the Irish Oaks at the Curragh in early July. She was restrained at the back of the field by Piggott and then had trouble obtaining a clear run. She made rapid progress in the closing stages, but was unable to catch the Irish-trained Princess Pati and finished second, beaten two lengths. The Yorkshire Oaks at York Racecourse in August saw a change in tactics. Circus Plume led from the start and was never seriously challenged, winning by six lengths from Kanz and Ballinderry.

On her final appearance of the season, Circus Plume was set to France for the Prix Vermeille at Longchamp Racecourse in September. She tracked the pacemakers before taking the lead in the straight, at which point the race devolved into a match between Circus Plume and the French filly Northern Trick. Circus Plume finished second, a length behind Northern Trick and three lengths clear of the other runners.

=== 1985: four-year-old season ===
Circus Plume stayed in training in 1985, but failed to add to her reputation in two starts. She was unplaced behind Kirmann in the Jockey Club Stakes at Newmarket in May and fourth behind Shernazar in the September Stakes at Kempton Park Racecourse.

== Assessment ==
The independent Timeform organisation gave Circus Plume a rating of 124 in 1984, seven pounds below the top-rated three-year-old filly Northern Trick. In their book A Century of Champions, based on a modified version of the Timeform system, John Randall and Tony Morris rated Circus Plume as an "average" Oaks winner.

== Stud career ==
Circus Plume was retired from racing to become a broodmare for Sir Robin McAlpine. Circus Plume died in 1996. She produced several winners including:

- 1987 Circus Feathers (GB): chesnut filly, foaled 10 February, by Kris (GB) – won 2 races from 5 starts in England 1989–90; dam of winners.
- 1990 Circus Colours (GB): bay colt (gelded), foaled 1 January, by Rainbow Quest (USA) – won 2 races from 15 starts on the flat in England 1992–93 and 4 races from 27 starts over hurdles in England 1994–97. Also won 3 point-to-points.
- 1993 Scarlet Plume (GB): bay filly, foaled 8 February, by Warning (GB) – won 2 races including G3 Premio Dormello, San Siro and 2nd LR October S, Ascot from 10 starts in England, Italy and France 1995–96
- 1994 Barnum Sands (GB): bay colt, foaled 24 February, by Green Desert (USA) – won 3 races and 2nd LR Autumn S, Ascot, 2nd LR Dee S, Chester from 11 starts in England 1996–97

== Pedigree ==
Pedigree of Circus Plume (GB), bay mare, 1981
Sire High Top (IRE) 1969	Derring-Do (GB); 1961	Darius	Dante
Sire High Top (IRE) 1969	Derring-Do (GB); 1961	Darius	Yasna
Sire High Top (IRE) 1969	Derring-Do (GB); 1961	Sipsey Bridge	Abernant
Sire High Top (IRE) 1969	Derring-Do (GB); 1961	Sipsey Bridge	Claudette
Sire High Top (IRE) 1969	Camenae (GB); 1961	Vimy	Wild Risk
Sire High Top (IRE) 1969	Camenae (GB); 1961	Vimy	Mimi
Sire High Top (IRE) 1969	Camenae (GB); 1961	Madrilene	Court Martial
Sire High Top (IRE) 1969	Camenae (GB); 1961	Madrilene	Marmite
Dam Golden Fez (GB) 1966	Aureole (GB); 1950	Hyperion	Gainsborough
Dam Golden Fez (GB) 1966	Aureole (GB); 1950	Hyperion	Selene
Dam Golden Fez (GB) 1966	Aureole (GB); 1950	Angelola	Donatello
Dam Golden Fez (GB) 1966	Aureole (GB); 1950	Angelola	Feola
Dam Golden Fez (GB) 1966	Zabara (GB); 1949	Persian Gulf	Bahram
Dam Golden Fez (GB) 1966	Zabara (GB); 1949	Persian Gulf	Double Life
Dam Golden Fez (GB) 1966	Zabara (GB); 1949	Samovar	Caerleon
Dam Golden Fez (GB) 1966	Zabara (GB); 1949	Samovar	Carolina (Family: 1-k)
