= Dar Re Mi =

British-bred Thoroughbred racehorse

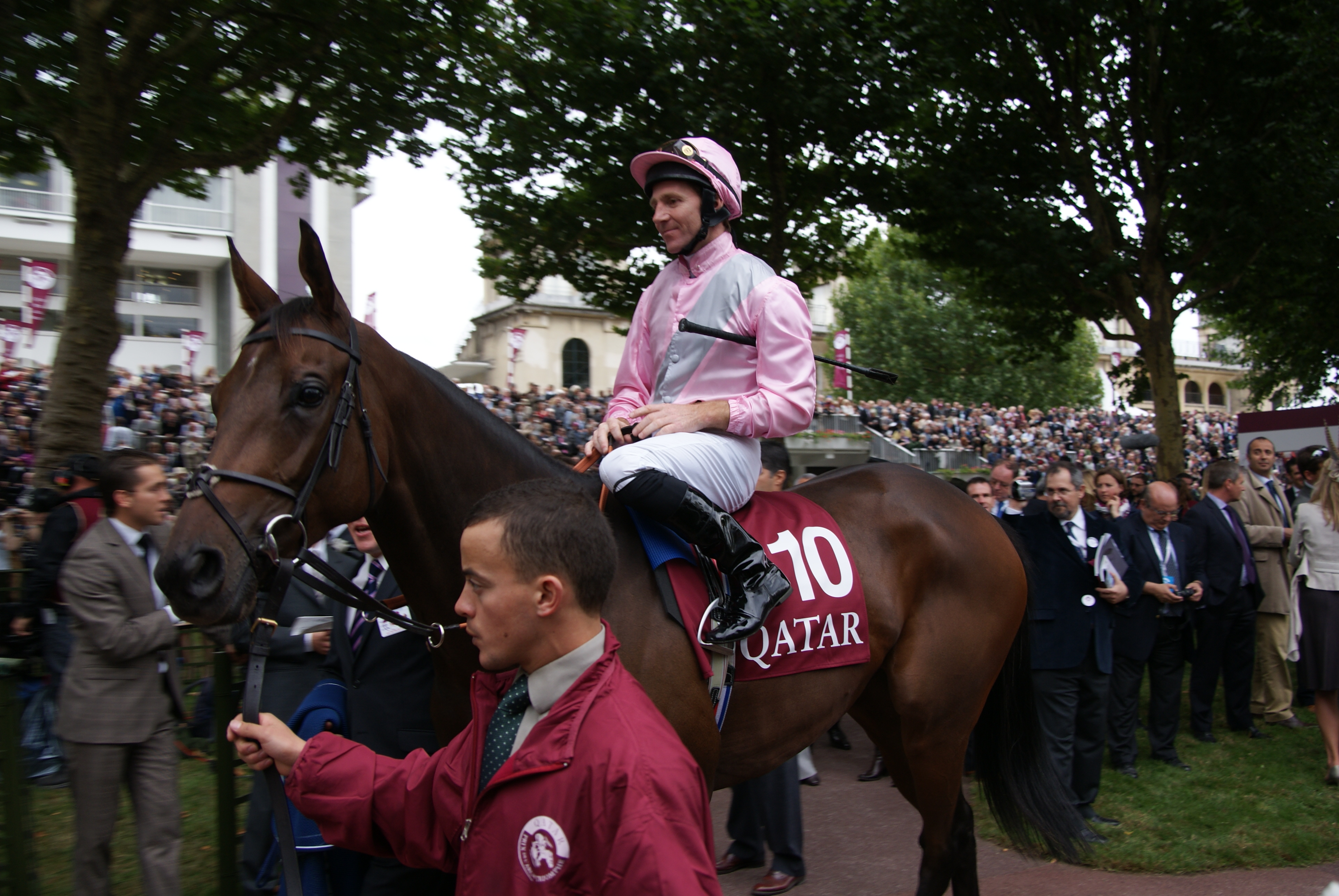
- Sire: Singspiel
- Grandsire: In The Wings
- Dam: Darara
- Damsire: Top Ville
- Sex: Mare
- Foaled: 2005
- Country: Great Britain
- Colour: Bay
- Breeder: Axel Wend
- Owner: Andrew Lloyd Webber
- Trainer: John Gosden
- Record: 16: 6-4-4
- Earnings: £2,672,030

Major wins
- Prix Minerve (2008); Pretty Polly Stakes (2009); Yorkshire Oaks (2009); Dubai Sheema Classic (2010)
- Last updated on 28 March 2010

Dar Re Mi (foaled 2005 in Great Britain) is a retired Thoroughbred racehorse. In a racing career lasting from 2007 to 2010 she won six times, including three at Group One level. Since retiring from racing she has become a very successful broodmare.

== Background ==
Dar Re Mi is a daughter of Singspiel out of the mare Darara. Singspiel was a very successful breeding stallion whose other top horses include Hibaayeb and Moon Ballad. During her racing career she was owned by Andrew Lloyd Webber and trained by John Gosden.

== Racing career ==
Dar Re Mi notably ran third in the 2009 Breeders' Cup Turf. She won the Yorkshire Oaks at the Ebor Festival and in August 2009. On 27 March 2010 she earned the most important win of her career in the 2010 Dubai Sheema Classic.

== Breeding record ==
Dar Re Mi was retired to stud in September 2010 at Watership Down Stud, owned by Madeleine Gurdon, Lady Lloyd Webber. Dar Re Mi's first foal, a colt called De Treville sired by Oasis Dream, won two races and placed four times in group races. Her second foal So Mi Dar, a filly sired by Dubawi, won the Investec Derby Trial and Musidora Stakes in 2016. Her fourth foal, Lah Ti Dar, won the Pretty Polly Stakes in 2018. Later that year her son Too Darn Hot won the Dewhurst Stakes and followed up with wins in the Prix Jean Prat and Sussex Stakes in 2019.
