= Toulon (horse) =

Thoroughbred racehorse

- Racing colours of Khalid Abdullah
- Sire: Top Ville
- Grandsire: High Top
- Dam: Green Rock
- Damsire: Mill Reef
- Sex: Stallion
- Foaled: 15 April 1988
- Country: United Kingdom
- Colour: Bay
- Breeder: Juddmonte Farms
- Owner: Khalid Abdulla
- Trainer: André Fabre; Bobby Frankel
- Record: 14: 5-0-2
- Earnings: £323,734 in Europe $80,200 in California

Major wins
- Chester Vase (1991); Prix Maurice de Nieuil (1991); St. Leger Stakes (1991); Jim Murray Memorial Handicap (1993)

Toulon (1988–1998), was a Thoroughbred racehorse and sire who was bred in Britain and trained in France. In a career which lasted from October 1990 until October 1992, he ran eleven times and won four races. He recorded his most important success when winning the Classic St. Leger Stakes as a three-year-old in 1990, the same year in which he won the Chester Vase and the Prix Maurice de Nieuil as well as finishing fourth in the Prix de l'Arc de Triomphe. In the following season he failed to win in four races in Europe and had limited success when racing in California in 1993. He was then retired to stud, where he proved to be a successful sire of National Hunt horses.

== Background ==
Toulon was a bay horse with a white star, bred in the United Kingdom by his owner, Khalid Abdulla's Juddmonte Farms organisation. He was one of the best horses sired by Top Ville, the Irish-bred winner of the 1979 Prix du Jockey Club. Toulon's dam, Green Rock was a daughter of Infra Green, who won Prix Ganay and produced good winners including Infrasonic (Queen's Vase) and Greensmith (second in the St James's Palace Stakes). The colt was sent into training with André Fabre at Chantilly. He was ridden in all but his first and last races European races by the veteran Irish jockey Pat Eddery.

== Racing career ==
=== 1990: two-year-old season ===
Toulon did not appear on a racecourse until the late autumn of 1990. On 25 October he ran against two opponents in the Prix de Sablonville over 1800m at Longchamp. Ridden for the only time by Cash Asmussen, he won by a neck from Sarajoudin.

=== 1991: three-year-old season ===
On his first appearance of 1991, Toulon was stepped up in class for the Group Two Prix Greffulhe at Longchamp, in which he was ridden for the first time by Pat Eddery. He took the lead in the straight but was overtaken by Suave Dancer who won comfortably by four lengths, with Toulon in third. With Suave Dancer being aimed at the Prix du Jockey Club, Toulon's connections targeted The Derby and sent him to England for the Chester Vase on 7 May. Eddery held up the French-trained colt for a late challenge, but struggled to obtain a clear run and was badly hampered before Toulon broke clear to win easily from Luchiroverte.

Toulon's Chester win saw him regarded as a major contender for the Derby, and Epsom on 5 June, he started 4/1 joint favourite for the race against twelve opponents. He was towards the back of the field from the start and never challenged the leaders, finishing ninth behind Generous. In July, Toulon returned to France to race against older horses in the Prix Maurice de Nieuil at Maisons-Laffitte Racecourse. Toulon took the lead 200 m from the finish and went clear of his opponents before being eased down in the final strides to win by two lengths from the Irish four-year-old Topanoora.

On 14 September Toulon started 5/2 favourite for the St Leger over 14 1/2 furlongs at Doncaster Racecourse. Eddery restrained Toulon in the early stages before moving him up to challenge the leader Saddler's Hall in the straight. The two colts drew fifteen lengths clear of the rest of the runners, with Toulon being "driven out" by Eddery to prevail by 1 1/2 lengths. On his final start of the season, Toulon was brought back in distance to face Suave Dancer, Generous and eleven others in the Prix de l'Arc de Triomphe. He finished fourth, six lengths behind Suave Dancer, but ahead of important winners including In the Groove, Quest for Fame, Generous, Miss Alleged, Jet Ski Lady and Snurge.

=== 1992: four-year-old season ===
Toulon was well-beaten in all four of his races in 1992. He was third when favourite for the Jockey Club Stakes at Newmarket and then finished last of the six runners in the Prix Jean de Chaudenay. He ran fourth in the Grand Prix d'Evry in June and was then off the course until autumn. On his final European appearance he was sent to Germany and finished fourth of the five runners in the Preis der Spielbanken des Landes Nordrhein-Westfalen at Düsseldorf in October, a race in which he was ridden by Paul Eddery.

=== 1993: five-year-old season ===
In 1993, Toulon was sent to be trained by Bobby Frankel in California. He produced two "dismal" performances at Santa Anita Park before winning the Jim Murray Memorial Handicap at Hollywood Park Racetrack

== Stud career ==
Toulon retired to stud in Ireland where he sired four crops of foals before his death in 1998. Toulon sired some winners of flat races but was much more successful as a National Hunt stallion. His best winners included the steeplechaser Kingscliff (Betfair Chase) and the Irish-trained mare Solerina who won twenty-two races including three runnings of the Hatton's Grace Hurdle.

== Pedigree ==
Pedigree of Toulon (GB), bay stallion, 1988
Sire Top Ville (IRE) 1976	High Top (IRE); 1969	Derring-Do	Darius
Sire Top Ville (IRE) 1976	High Top (IRE); 1969	Derring-Do	Sipsey Bridge
Sire Top Ville (IRE) 1976	High Top (IRE); 1969	Camenae	Vimy
Sire Top Ville (IRE) 1976	High Top (IRE); 1969	Camenae	Madrilene
Sire Top Ville (IRE) 1976	Sega Ville (FR); 1968	Charlottesville	Prince Chevalier
Sire Top Ville (IRE) 1976	Sega Ville (FR); 1968	Charlottesville	Noorani
Sire Top Ville (IRE) 1976	Sega Ville (FR); 1968	La Sega	Tantieme
Sire Top Ville (IRE) 1976	Sega Ville (FR); 1968	La Sega	La Danse
Dam Green Rock (FR) 1981	Mill Reef (USA); 1968	Never Bend	Nasrullah
Dam Green Rock (FR) 1981	Mill Reef (USA); 1968	Never Bend	Lalun
Dam Green Rock (FR) 1981	Mill Reef (USA); 1968	Milan Mill	Princequillo
Dam Green Rock (FR) 1981	Mill Reef (USA); 1968	Milan Mill	Virginia Water
Dam Green Rock (FR) 1981	Infra Green (IRE); 1972	Laser Light	Aureole
Dam Green Rock (FR) 1981	Infra Green (IRE); 1972	Laser Light	Ruby Laser
Dam Green Rock (FR) 1981	Infra Green (IRE); 1972	Greenback	Fric
Dam Green Rock (FR) 1981	Infra Green (IRE); 1972	Greenback	Mrs Green (Family:3-c)
