= International Stakes =

Flat horse race in Britain

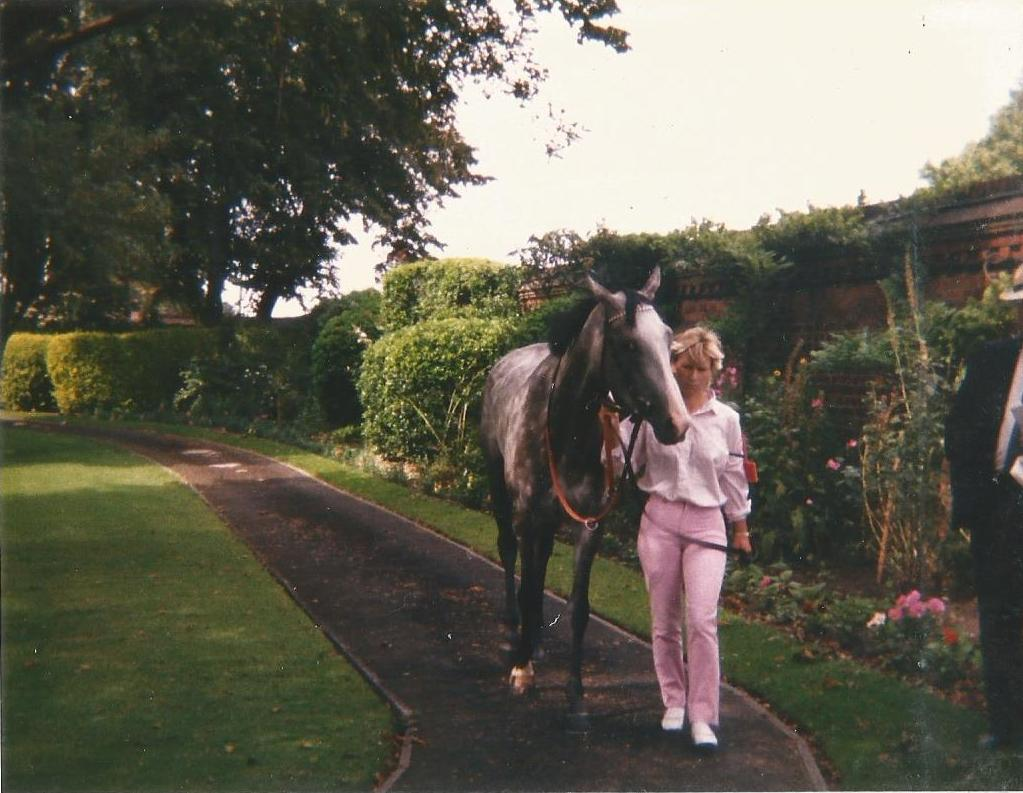
- Indian Skimmer prior to the 1988 race
- Class: Group 1
- Location: York Racecourse; York, England
- Inaugurated: 1972
- Race type: Flat / Thoroughbred
- Sponsor: Juddmonte
- Website: York

Race information
- Distance: 1m 2f 56y (2,063 m)
- Surface: Turf
- Track: Left-handed
- Qualification: Three-years-old and up
- Weight: 9 st 1 lb (3yo); 9 st 8 lb (4yo+); Allowances; 3 lb for fillies and mares
- Purse: £1,500,000 (2026); 1st: £850,650

International Stakes
2026
Item	Almaqam	Consitution River

Previous years
2025
Ombudsman	Delacroix	Birr Castle
2024
City Of Troy	Calandagan	Ghostwriter
2023
Mostahdaf	Nashwa	Paddington
2022
Baaeed	Mishriff	Sir Busker
2021
Mishriff	Alenquer	Love

2020-2011
2020
Ghaiyyath	Magical	Lord North
2019
Japan	Crystal Ocean	Elarqam
2018
Roaring Lion	Poet's Word	Thundering Blue
2017
Ulysses	Churchill	Barney Roy
2016
Postponed	Highland Reel	Mutakayyef
2015
Arabian Queen	Golden Horn	The Grey Gatsby
2014
Australia	The Grey Gatsby	Telescope
2013
Declaration Of War	Trading Leather	Al Kazeem
2012
Frankel	Farhh	St Nicholas Abbey
2011
Twice Over	Midday	Await The Dawn

2010-2001
2010
Rip Van Winkle	Twice Over	Byword
2009
Sea The Stars	Mastercraftsman	Set Sail
2008
Duke Of Marmalade	Phoenix Tower	New Approach
2007
Authorized	Dylan Thomas	Notnowcato
2006
Notnowcato	Maraahel	Blue Monday
2005
Electrocutionist	Zenno Rob Roy	Maraahel
2004
Sulamani	Norse Dancer	Bago
2003
Falbrav	Magistretti	Nayef
2002
Nayef	Golan	Noverre
2001
Sakhee	Grandera	Medicean

2000-1991
2000
Giant's Causeway	Kalanisi	Lear Spear
1999
Royal Anthem	Greek Dance	Chester House
1998
One So Wonderful	Faithful Son	Chester House
1997
Singspiel	Desert King	Benny The Dip
1996
Halling	First Island	Bijou d'Inde
1995
Halling	Bahri	Annus Mirabilis
1994
Ezzoud	Muhtarram	King's Theatre
1993
Ezzoud	Sabrehill	Spartan Shareef
1992
Rodrigo De Triano	All At Sea	Seattle Rhyme
1991
Terimon	Quest For Fame	Stagecraft

1990-1981
1990
In The Groove	Elmaamul	Batshoof
1989
Ile De Chypre	Cacoethes	Shady Heights
1988
Shady Heights	Indian Skimmer	Persian Heights
1987
Triptych	Ascot Knight	Sir Harry Lewis
1986
Shardari	Triptych	Damister
1985
Commanche Run	Oh So Sharp	Triptych
1984
Cormorant Wood	Tolomeo	Chief Singer
1983
Caerleon	Hot Touch	John French
1982
Assert	Norwick	Amyndas
1981
Beldale Flutter	Kirtling	Master Willie

1980-1978
1980
Master Willie	Cairn Rouge	Cracaval
1979
Troy	Crimson Beau	Lyphard's Wish
1978
Hawaiian Sound	Gunner B	Jellaby

The International Stakes is a Group 1 flat horse race in Great Britain open to horses aged three years or older. It is run at York over a distance of 1 mile, 2 furlongs and 56 yards (2,063 metres), and it is scheduled to take place each year in August.

== History ==
The event was devised by Major Leslie Petch, a former Clerk of the Course at York. It was first run in 1972, but by this time Petch had resigned from his position due to ill health. The race was originally sponsored by Benson and Hedges and called the Benson and Hedges Gold Cup. The inaugural running was won by Roberto, that year's Derby winner. The second-placed horse was Brigadier Gerard – his only defeat in a career of eighteen races.

The sponsorship of Benson and Hedges continued until 1985, and for the following two years the event was backed by the bloodstock company Matchmaker. Its title during this period was the Matchmaker International. The present sponsor, Juddmonte Farms, started supporting the race in 1989. It is now familiarly known as the Juddmonte International.

The International Stakes is currently held on the opening day of York's four-day Ebor Festival meeting. It is the venue's richest race of the season and the 2024 renewal was rated the best horse race in the world that year.

== Records ==
Most successful horse (2 wins):

- Dahlia – 1974, 1975
- Ezzoud – 1993, 1994
- Halling – 1995, 1996

Leading jockey (6 wins):

- Frankie Dettori – Halling (1996), Singspiel (1997), Sakhee (2001), Sulamani (2004), Authorized (2007), Mostahdaf (2023)

Leading trainer (7 wins):

- Aidan O'Brien - Giant's Causeway (2000), Duke of Marmalade (2008), Rip van Winkle (2010), Declaration of War (2013), Australia (2014), Japan (2019), City of Troy (2024)

Leading owner (7 wins): (includes part ownership)

- Susan Magnier - Giant's Causeway (2000), Duke of Marmalade (2008), Rip van Winkle (2010), Declaration of War (2013), Australia (2014), Japan (2019), City of Troy (2024)
- Michael Tabor - Giant's Causeway (2000), Duke of Marmalade (2008), Rip van Winkle (2010), Declaration of War (2013), Australia (2014), Japan (2019), City of Troy (2024)

== Winners ==
Year	Winner	Age	Jockey	Trainer	Owner	Time
1972	Roberto	3	Braulio Baeza	Vincent O'Brien	John W. Galbreath	2:07.10
1973	Moulton	4	Geoff Lewis	Harry Wragg	Budgie Moller	2:20.40
1974	Dahlia	4	Lester Piggott	Maurice Zilber	Nelson Bunker Hunt	2:09.40
1975	Dahlia	5	Lester Piggott	Maurice Zilber	Nelson Bunker Hunt	2:10.93
1976	Wollow	3	Gianfranco Dettori	Henry Cecil	Carlo d'Alessio	2:11.61
1977	Relkino	4	Willie Carson	Dick Hern	Lady Beaverbrook	2:09.24
1978	Hawaiian Sound	3	Lester Piggott	Barry Hills	Robert Sangster	2:09.75
1979	Troy	3	Willie Carson	Dick Hern	Sobell / Weinstock	2:06.40
1980	Master Willie	3	Philip Waldron	Henry Candy	William Barnett	2:13.30
1981	Beldale Flutter	3	Pat Eddery	Michael Jarvis	Tony Kelly	2:13.28
1982	Assert	3	Pat Eddery	David O'Brien	Robert Sangster	2:09.09
1983	Caerleon	3	Pat Eddery	Vincent O'Brien	Robert Sangster	2:16.35
1984	Cormorant Wood	4	Steve Cauthen	Barry Hills	Bobby McAlpine	2:09.87
1985	Commanche Run	4	Lester Piggott	Luca Cumani	Ivan Allan	2:18.79
1986	Shardari	4	Walter Swinburn	Michael Stoute	HH Aga Khan IV	2:08.28
1987	Triptych	5	Steve Cauthen	Patrick Biancone	Alan Clore	2:15.53
1988	Shady Heights (Note: Persian Heights finished first in 1988, but he was relegated to third place following a stewards' inquiry)	4	Willie Carson	Robert Armstrong	George Tong	2:06.35
1989	Ile de Chypre	4	Tony Clark	Guy Harwood	Athos Christodoulou	2:06.91
1990	In the Groove	3	Steve Cauthen	David Elsworth	Brian Cooper	2:08.77
1991	Terimon	5	Michael Roberts	Clive Brittain	Lady Beaverbrook	2:16.18
1992	Rodrigo de Triano	3	Lester Piggott	Peter Chapple-Hyam	Robert Sangster	2:07.19
1993	Ezzoud	4	Walter Swinburn	Michael Stoute	Maktoum Al Maktoum	2:12.16
1994	Ezzoud	5	Walter Swinburn	Michael Stoute	Maktoum Al Maktoum	2:08.85
1995	Halling	4	Walter Swinburn	Saeed bin Suroor	Godolphin	2:06.42
1996	Halling	5	Frankie Dettori	Saeed bin Suroor	Godolphin	2:06.88
1997	Singspiel	5	Frankie Dettori	Michael Stoute	Sheikh Mohammed	2:12.10
1998	One So Wonderful	4	Pat Eddery	Luca Cumani	Helena Springfield Ltd	2:06.46
1999	Royal Anthem	4	Gary Stevens	Henry Cecil	Thoroughbred Corp.	2:06.91
2000	Giant's Causeway	3	Michael Kinane	Aidan O'Brien	Magnier / Tabor	2:09.30
2001	Sakhee	4	Frankie Dettori	Saeed bin Suroor	Godolphin	2:08.27
2002	Nayef	4	Richard Hills	Marcus Tregoning	Hamdan Al Maktoum	2:08.74
2003	Falbrav	5	Darryll Holland	Luca Cumani	Rencati / Yoshida	2:06.84
2004	Sulamani	5	Frankie Dettori	Saeed bin Suroor	Godolphin	2:11.82
2005	Electrocutionist	4	Michael Kinane	Valfredo Valiani	Earle I. Mack	2:07.47
2006	Notnowcato	4	Ryan Moore	Sir Michael Stoute	A. & D. de Rothschild	2:12.32
2007	Authorized	3	Frankie Dettori	Peter Chapple-Hyam	Al Homaizi / Al Sagar	2:11.82
2008 (Note: The 2008 running took place at Newmarket over 1 mile and 2 furlongs)	Duke of Marmalade	4	Johnny Murtagh	Aidan O'Brien	Magnier/ Tabor	2:01.53
2009	Sea the Stars	3	Michael Kinane	John Oxx	Christopher Tsui	2:05.29
2010	Rip Van Winkle	4	Johnny Murtagh	Aidan O'Brien	Magnier/Tabor/ Smith	2:08.58
2011	Twice Over	6	Ian Mongan	Sir Henry Cecil	Khalid Abdullah	2:14.70
2012	Frankel	4	Tom Queally	Sir Henry Cecil	Khalid Abdullah	2:06.59
2013	Declaration of War	4	Joseph O'Brien	Aidan O'Brien	Magnier/ Tabor/ Smith / Allen	2:05.74
2014	Australia	3	Joseph O'Brien	Aidan O'Brien	Smith / Magnier / Tabor / Ah Khing	2:07.35
2015	Arabian Queen	3	Silvestre de Sousa	David Elsworth	Jeff Smith	2:07.35
2016	Postponed	5	Andrea Atzeni	Roger Varian	Mohammed Obaid Al Maktoum	2:06.58
2017	Ulysses	4	Jim Crowley	Sir Michael Stoute	Flaxman Stables Ireland	2:12.11
2018	Roaring Lion	3	Oisin Murphy	John Gosden	Qatar Racing Limited	2:07.70
2019	Japan	3	Ryan Moore	Aidan O'Brien	Magnier/Tabor/ Smith	2:07.77
2020	Ghaiyyath	5	William Buick	Charlie Appleby	Godolphin	2:07.38
2021	Mishriff	4	David Egan	John & Thady Gosden	A A Faisal	2:05.92
2022	Baaeed	4	Jim Crowley	William Haggas	Shadwell Estate	2:09.30
2023	Mostahdaf	5	Frankie Dettori	John & Thady Gosden	Shadwell Estate	2:06.40
2024	City of Troy	3	Ryan Moore	Aidan O'Brien	Magnier/Tabor/ Smith	2:04.32
2025	Ombudsman	4	William Buick	John & Thady Gosden	Godolphin	2:07.90
2026	Item	3	Colin Keane	Andrew Balding	Juddmonte	2:08.44

== See also ==
- Horse racing in Great Britain
- List of British flat horse races
- Recurring sporting events established in 1972 – this race is included under its original title, Benson and Hedges Gold Cup.
