= Prix Saint-Roman =

- Class: Group 3
- Location: Various, France
- Final run: 14 November 2000
- Race type: Flat / Thoroughbred

Race information
- Distance: 1,800 m (1.1 mi; 8.9 furlongs) (pre-1997); 1,600 m (1.0 mi; 8.0 furlongs) (1997–2000)
- Surface: Turf
- Qualification: Two-year-olds (fillies only 1998–2000) excluding Group 1 winners
- Weight: 56 kg Penalties; 3 kg for Group winners
- Purse: 364,000 F (2000); 1st: 220,000 F

The Prix Saint-Roman was a Group 3 flat horse race in France open to two-year-old thoroughbreds. For much of its history it was run at Longchamp over a distance of 1,800 m (1.1 mi; 8.9 furlongs), and it was scheduled to take place each year in late September or early October.

== History ==
During the 1890s and early 1900s, the event was a 3,000-metre race for older horses. It was staged in early October, on the same day as the Prix du Conseil Municipal.

The Prix Saint-Roman was restricted to two-year-olds and cut to 1,800 metres in 1907. It became part of the Prix de l'Arc de Triomphe meeting in 1920.

The present system of race grading was introduced in 1971, and the Prix Saint-Roman was classed at Group 3 level.

The race was moved to the week before the Prix de l'Arc de Triomphe in 1989. It was transferred to Évry in 1991, and switched to November in 1994. It was relocated to Saint-Cloud and shortened to 1,600 metres in 1997.

The Prix Saint-Roman was closed to colts and geldings in 1998. It continued as a fillies' race until 2000. It was replaced the following year by the Prix Miesque, a Group 3 race at Maisons-Laffitte.

== Records ==
Leading jockey since 1977 (4 wins):

- Freddy Head – Trigonome (1981), Saint Cyrien (1982), Truculent (1983), Tagel (1988)

Leading trainer since 1977 (4 wins):

- François Boutin – Corvaro (1979), Blushing John (1987), Tagel (1988), Zindari (1993)

Leading owner since 1977 (2 wins):

- Paul de Moussac – Noir et Or (1977), Pigeon Voyageur (1990)
- Sheikh Mohammed – Conmaiche (1986), Richard of York (1992)
- Allen Paulson – Blushing John (1987), Tagel (1988)

== Winners since 1977 ==
Year	Winner	Jockey	Trainer	Owner	Time
1977	Noir et Or	Maurice Philipperon	John Cunnington Jr.	Paul de Moussac
1978	Top Ville	Henri Samani	François Mathet	HH Aga Khan IV	1:59.30
1979	Corvaro	Philippe Paquet	François Boutin	Gerry Oldham
1980	Mariacho	Georges Doleuze	Freddie Palmer	Mrs Alexandre Savin
1981	Trigonome	Freddy Head	Robert Collet	Philippe Sanglier
1982	Saint Cyrien	Freddy Head	Criquette Head	Ghislaine Head
1983	Truculent	Freddy Head	Alec Head	Jacques Wertheimer
1984	Vaguely Pleasant	Gary W. Moore	Jean de Roualle	André Ben Lassin
1985	Arokar	Cash Asmussen	Jacques de Chevigny	Prince Kais Al Said
1986	Conmaiche	Cash Asmussen	André Fabre	Sheikh Mohammed
1987	Blushing John	Yves Saint-Martin	François Boutin	Allen Paulson	1:51.20
1988	Tagel	Freddy Head	François Boutin	Allen Paulson	1:53.50
1989	Bleu de France	Éric Legrix	Jean-Marie Béguigné	Guy de Rothschild	2:10.60
1990	Pigeon Voyageur	Cash Asmussen	André Fabre	Paul de Moussac	2:01.50
1991	Calling Collect	Dominique Boeuf	Élie Lellouche	G. Gatto-Roissard	1:56.66
1992	Richard of York	Thierry Jarnet	André Fabre	Sheikh Mohammed	1:54.68
1993	Zindari	Gérald Mossé	François Boutin	Khalid Abdullah	1:57.58
1994	Vaneyck	Sylvain Guillot	Philippe Demercastel	Michel Debeusscher	2:09.13
1995	Spinning World	Olivier Peslier	Jonathan Pease	Stavros Niarchos	2:04.45
1996	Voyagers Quest	John Reid	Peter Chapple-Hyam	Richard Kaster	2:01.98
1997	Eco Friendly	Darryll Holland	Barry Hills	Bill Gredley	1:52.10
1998	Mother of Pearl	Olivier Peslier	Peter Chapple-Hyam	Magnier / Sangster	1:51.10
1999	Texalina	Gérald Mossé	Jean de Roualle	Bernard Jeffroy	1:55.60
2000	Perfect Plum	George Duffield	Sir Mark Prescott	Sir Edmund Loder	1:52.30

== Earlier winners ==
- 1894: Blandy
- 1895: Sterlet
- 1896: Mamiano
- 1897: Arlequin
- 1898: Bonnet Vert
- 1899: Little Monarque
- 1900: Kroshka
- 1901: Alba
- 1902: Monoeci Arx
- 1903: Fanion
- 1904: Apanage
- 1905: Marsan
- 1906: Pois Rouges
- 1907: Quintette
- 1908: Reyna
- 1909: Coquille
- 1910: Grand Seigneur / Lahire *
- 1911: Romagny
- 1912: Amadou
- 1913: Frileux
- 1917: Spring Cleaning
- 1919: Strepera
- 1920: Soldat
- 1921: Kefalin
- 1922: Massine
- 1923: Isola Bella
- 1924: Eleusis
- 1925: Baltique
- 1926: Flamant
- 1927: Kerka
- 1928: Grock
- 1929: La Savoyarde
- 1930: Farnus
- 1931: Agnello
- 1932: Sunny Boy
- 1934: Chasse Neige
- 1935: Horncastle
- 1936: Gonfalonier
- 1937: Pylos
- 1938: Galerien
- 1940: Le Marmot
- 1941: Salmiana
- 1942: Bambou
- 1943: La Bagatelle
- 1947: Rigolo
- 1948: Coast Guard
- 1951: Silnet
- 1952: Fort de France
- 1953: Beigler Bey
- 1956: Amber
- 1957: Lackawanna
- 1959: Mincio
- 1960: Tchita
- 1962: Chutney
- 1963: Michilimackinac
- 1965: War Paint
- 1966: Timour
- 1968: Prince Regent
- 1969: Ananndpour
- 1970: Sharapour
- 1971: Neptunium
- 1972: Vexin
- 1973: Riverton
- 1974: Bold Pirate
- 1975: Far North
- 1976: Balteus

* The 1910 race was a dead-heat and has joint winners.

== See also ==
- List of French flat horse races
