= Shahrastani (horse) =

American-bred Thoroughbred racehorse

- Racing silks of Aga Khan
- Sire: Nijinsky
- Grandsire: Northern Dancer
- Dam: Shademah
- Damsire: Thatch
- Sex: Stallion
- Foaled: March 27, 1983
- Country: United States
- Colour: Chestnut
- Breeder: HH Aga Khan IV
- Owner: HH Aga Khan IV
- Trainer: Michael Stoute
- Record: 7: 4-1-0
- Earnings: US$987,692 (equivaklent)

Major wins
- Sandown Classic Trial (1986); Dante Stakes (1986); Epsom Derby (1986); Irish Derby (1986)

Awards
- Timeform rating: 135
- Last updated on May 13, 2007

Shahrastani (1983–2011) was an American-bred, British-trained Thoroughbred racehorse. He won four of his seven races between September 1985 and October 1986. He is best known for his performances in the summer of 1986 when he defeated Dancing Brave in the Epsom Derby and went on to win the Irish Derby by eight lengths. At the end of the season he was retired to stud, but made little impact as a stallion. He died in 2011.

== Background ==
Shahrastani was a chestnut horse with a broad white blaze bred in Kentucky by his owner HH Aga Khan IV. He was sired by the Triple Crown winner Nijinsky and was the first foal of the mare Shademah, a half sister to the Grand Prix de Saint-Cloud winner Shakapour. The colt was sent into training with Michael Stoute at Newmarket and was ridden in all his races by Walter Swinburn.

== Racing career ==
=== 1985:two-year-old season ===
Sharastani was not highly tried as a two-year-old and appeared on the racecourse only once. In September he finished strongly to be second by a head to My Ton Ton in the Haynes, Hanson and Clark Conditions Stakes at Newbury. Timeform described him as being "sure to improve" and a "very useful colt in the making".

=== 1986:three-year-old season ===
In 1986 Shahrastani was aimed at the Epsom Derby and began his season by winning the Sandown Classic Trial in April. He was described as looking extremely impressive as he defeated the previously unbeaten Royal Lodge Stakes winner Bonhomie. A month later he was set to York where he won the Dante Stakes.

At Epsom in June he started at odds of 11/2 for the Derby in a field of fifteen runners. The favourite for the race was the unbeaten Dancing Brave, the impressive winner of the 2000 Guineas. After tracking the leaders in a slowly run race, Swinburn sent Shahrastani into the lead in the straight and opened up a clear lead. In the closing stages he held of the late challenge of Dancing Brave to win by half a length. Three weeks after his Epsom win, Shahrastani was sent to the Curragh Racecourse for the Irish Derby. He started the even money favourite against a field which included the Epsom third Mashkour and Dancing Brave's stable companion Bakharoff, the leading European two-year-old of 1985. Shahrastani took the lead two furlongs from the finish and pulled away from his opponents to win very easily by eight lengths. In July, Shahrastani started favourite for his rematch with Dancing Brave in the King George VI and Queen Elizabeth Stakes at Ascot. He was never able to reach the lead and finished fourth behind Dancing Brave, Shardari and Triptych.

On his final racecourse appearance, Shahrastani finished fourth in October's Prix de l'Arc de Triomphe at Longchamp.

== Assessment ==
Sharastani was given a rating of 135 by Timeform.

In their book A Century of Champions, John Randall and Tony Morris rated Sharastani as a "superior" Derby winner and the ninety-third best British or Irish racehorse of the 20th century.

== Retirement and stud ==
At the end of the 1986 racing season, Shahrastani was retired to stud. He stood with limited success at Three Chimneys Farm in Kentucky as well as at Clashmore Stud in Ireland and breeding farms in France and Japan. His best runner on the flat was probably Dariyoun who won some good races in Spain including the domestic Group I Gran Premio Madrid. Shahrastani also sired the good hurdler Zabadi who won the Anniversary 4-Y-O Novices' Hurdle He is also the damsire of Alamshar, whose victories include the 2003 Irish Derby and King George VI and Queen Elizabeth Diamond Stakes. Shahrastani was put down in December 2011 at Walton Fields Stud in Grimston, Leicestershire because of deteriorating health, having retired from stallion duties a year earlier. He was twenty-eight years old, an advanced age for a thoroughbred.

== Pedigree ==
Pedigree of Shahrastani, chestnut stallion 1983
Sire Nijinsky II	Northern Dancer	Nearctic	Nearco
Sire Nijinsky II	Northern Dancer	Nearctic	Lady Angela
Sire Nijinsky II	Northern Dancer	Natalma	Native Dancer
Sire Nijinsky II	Northern Dancer	Natalma	Almahmoud
Sire Nijinsky II	Flaming Page	Bull Page	Bull Lea
Sire Nijinsky II	Flaming Page	Bull Page	Our Page
Sire Nijinsky II	Flaming Page	Flaring Top	Menow
Sire Nijinsky II	Flaming Page	Flaring Top	Flaming Top
Dam Shademah	Thatch	Forli	Aristophanes
Dam Shademah	Thatch	Forli	Trevisa
Dam Shademah	Thatch	Thong	Nantallah
Dam Shademah	Thatch	Thong	Rough Shod
Dam Shademah	Shamim	Le Haar	Vieux Manoir
Dam Shademah	Shamim	Le Haar	Mince Pie
Dam Shademah	Shamim	Diamond Drop	Charlottesville
Dam Shademah	Shamim	Diamond Drop	Martine
