= Patrick Biancone =

French racehorse trainer

Patrick Louis Biancone (born June 7, 1952, in Mont-de-Marsan, Landes, France) is a Thoroughbred racehorse trainer. He is currently based in the United States, but enjoyed success in both Europe and Hong Kong earlier in his career. His best known horse, All Along, won the 1983 Prix de l'Arc de Triomphe, and was voted both French and U.S. Horse of the Year and was inducted into the U.S. Racing Hall of Fame. In 2007, Biancone was investigated by the Kentucky Horse Racing Authority and suspended for one year, later shortened to six months.

== Career ==
Biancone was the head trainer for the Daniel Wildenstein stable in France, where his horses won numerous important races including back-to-back victories (with All Along and Sagace) in the 1983 and 1984 Prix de l'Arc de Triomphe. All Along, a filly who also raced in North America, was voted both French and U.S. Horse of the Year and was inducted into the U.S. Racing Hall of Fame.

Biancone trained Triptych, who won the 1987 Irish Champion Stakes and the 1988 Coronation Cup.

For most of the 1990s Biancone trained in Hong Kong, but in 1999 he was suspended after two of his horses tested positive for banned medications.

Among his efforts in the United States, Patrick Biancone trained Lion Heart, who finished second in the 2004 Kentucky Derby. In 2005, he trained Angara to win the Beverly D stakes. The following year, Biancone's Gorella took the Beverly D.

== Kentucky Horse Racing Authority investigation ==
On June 22, 2007, Biancone became the subject of an investigation by the Kentucky Horse Racing Authority (KHRA) and his Keeneland barns were raided by Kentucky stewards. Cobra venom, which is barred by state regulation from racetrack grounds, was found in a crystalline form in a refrigerator in Biancone's barn during the raid. Snake venom is a neurotoxin that can be injected to deaden pain in a joint or nerve. On September 17, 2007, Dr. Rodney Stewart, Biancone's veterinarian, was suspended for five years by the KHRA for possessing cobra venom, two other Class A Drugs, and various other violations that resulted from the investigation after the June raid.

On October 4, 2007, Biancone was suspended for one year by the KHRA, a penalty that on October 17, 2007, was shortened to a six-month suspension with the caveat that Biancone could not apply for a trainer's license for another six months after the suspension ended. As a part of this settlement, Biancone agreed to remove his name as the "trainer of record" for his Breeders' Cup entries and to end his appeal of the suspension. During the suspension his horses were moved to trainers with whom he had no business relationship, and he was banned from both the public and private areas of Kentucky race tracks (and through reciprocity to all North American tracks).

The day after his settlement agreement with the KHRA, Biancone issued a press release that indicated that he was innocent.
