= Dancing Brave =

American-bred Thoroughbred racehorse and sire (1983–1999)

- Breed: Thoroughbred
- Sire: Lyphard
- Grandsire: Northern Dancer
- Dam: Navajo Princess
- Damsire: Drone
- Sex: Stallion
- Foaled: 11 May 1983
- Died: 2 August 1999 (aged 16)
- Country: United States
- Colour: Bay
- Breeder: Glen Oak Farm
- Owner: Khalid Abdullah
- Trainer: Guy Harwood
- Record: 10: 8-1-0
- Earnings: $1,776,723

Major wins
- Craven Stakes (1986); 2000 Guineas (1986); Eclipse Stakes (1986); K. George VI & Q. Elizabeth Stakes (1986); Select Stakes (1986); Prix de l'Arc de Triomphe (1986)

Awards
- Top-rated European horse (International Classification) (1986); Top-rated European horse (Timeform) (1986); British Horse of the Year (1986); Timeform rating: 140

Honours
- British Champions Series Hall of Fame (2022)
- Last updated on 5 July 2024

Dancing Brave (11 May 1983 – 2 August 1999) was an American-bred, British-trained Thoroughbred racehorse and sire. In a racing career which lasted from the autumn of 1985 until October 1986, he ran ten times and won eight races. Dancing Brave was the outstanding European racehorse of 1986, when he won the 2000 Guineas, the Eclipse Stakes, the King George VI and Queen Elizabeth Stakes and the Prix de l'Arc de Triomphe. His only defeats came in the Derby and the Breeders' Cup Turf. A modest sire of winners in Europe, he was later exported to Japan, where he enjoyed more success before his death in August 1999.

Dancing Brave is regarded as one of the greatest racehorses of the twentieth century.

== Background ==
Dancing Brave was a bay colt with a white snip and three white feet, standing sixteen hands high, bred by the Glen Oak Farm in Kentucky. He was not a particularly attractive individual as a young horse, being described as parrot-mouthed with imperfect forelegs. Dancing Brave was sired by Lyphard out of Navajo Princess, a mare who won sixteen races including the Molly Pitcher Handicap. Navajo Princess was a descendant of the mare Stolen Kiss, who was the ancestor of notable racehorses including the Epsom Derby winner Henbit and the Kentucky Derby winner Lucky Debonair.

He was purchased as a yearling by James Delahooke, on behalf of Khalid Abdullah for US$200,000 in Kentucky. The colt was sent into training with Guy Harwood at Pulborough. At the time, Harwood was noted for his modern approach to training, introducing Britain to features such as artificial gallops and barn-style stabling.

== Racing career ==
=== 1985: Two-year-old season ===
Dancing Brave was a May foal, and as Harwood did not believe in racing horses until they were at least two years and three months old, the colt was given only light training until late summer. Dancing Brave made his first racecourse appearance in the one-mile Dorking Stakes at Sandown in which he started odds-on favourite against three opponents. He won easily by three lengths from Mighty Memory. In the Soham House Stakes at Newmarket, Dancing Brave again started favourite after reports that he had been performing better at home than the stable's William Hill Futurity winner Bakharoff. He won by two and a half lengths from Northern Amethyst, with Nisnas in third. Despite never having contested a Group Race and being rated eleven pounds below the top-rated Bakharoff in the International Classification, he was made 10/1 winter favourite for the following year's 2000 Guineas.

=== 1986: Three-year-old season ===
==== Spring ====
Dancing Brave opened his three-year-old campaign with a victory over Faraway Dancer and Mashkour in the Craven Stakes at Newmarket in April. Over the same course and distance two weeks later he started 15/8 favourite against fourteen opponents in the 2000 Guineas. Ridden by Greville Starkey, he quickened in the closing stages of a slowly run race to win by three lengths from Green Desert and Huntingdale. After the race, Starkey was confident that the colt would stay one and a half miles in the Derby, although Harwood was more cautious.

==== Summer ====
In The Derby a month later Dancing Brave started favourite, despite concerns about his ability to stay the distance of twelve furlongs. Starkey employed exaggerated waiting tactics and Dancing Brave was close to last place entering the home straight. Switched to the outside to make his challenge, Dancing Brave accelerated in the last quarter mile, being clocked at 10.3 seconds for the penultimate furlong. He failed to catch the leader Shahrastani finishing second by half a length. His jockey, Greville Starkey, was widely criticised for his tactics, but he has been defended by others, including Harwood, who pointed out that the race was run at a muddling pace and that Starkey could only have won if he had "cut the horse in half", which as the stable jockey he was unwilling to do. Starkey kept the ride for Dancing Brave's next race, Eclipse Stakes at Sandown Park. Racing against older horses for the first time he won in "breathtaking style" by four lengths from Triptych and Teleprompter. However, when Starkey was injured and unable to ride the horse in the King George VI and Queen Elizabeth Stakes at Ascot he was replaced by Pat Eddery who became the preferred choice in the colt's remaining races. The Ascot race saw a rematch between Dancing Brave and Shahrastani. Since winning the Derby, Shahrastani had won the Irish Derby by eight lengths and started favourite for the King George. Eddery produced Dancing Brave's run earlier than usual, taking him into the lead over a furlong from home and the colt had to be ridden out to hold off Shardari by three-quarters of a length, with Triptych third, Shahrastani fourth and Petoski fifth. Eddery reported that Dancing Brave idled in front.

==== Autumn ====
After a break, Dancing Brave returned in the Select Stakes at Goodwood Racecourse in September. He tracked the leaders before pulling away in the closing stages to win by ten lengths. On his final European appearance, Dancing Brave was sent overseas for the first time to contest the Prix de l'Arc de Triomphe at Longchamp in Paris. Apart from Shardari, Shahrastani and Triptych, the field also included the German champion Acatenango and the French colt Bering, who was unbeaten in four races in 1986. Eddery restrained Dancing Brave in the early stages before switching him to the wide outside to challenge in the straight as the runners spread across the width of the course. With 200m to run he was not in the first ten, but produced an "electrifying burst" to take the lead 50m from the finish and won by a length and a half from Bering in a race record time of 2:27.7. On his final appearance was then sent to California to contest the Breeders' Cup Turf at Santa Anita Park but failed to reproduce his best form, finishing fourth behind Manila. Dancing Brave suffered an injury in the race when he was struck in the eye by a clod of turf.

== Assessment ==
At the end of 1986, the panel of Racehorse handicappers met from the major racing nations of Europe to determine the International Classifications, the annual rating of thoroughbred racehorses who have run in Europe. Dancing Brave was awarded a rating of 141, the highest rating ever given to any horse up to that time. These are the official ratings as recognised by the organised racing bodies in Great Britain, Ireland, France, Germany, Italy, Spain, Scandinavia, Switzerland and Austria. In January 2013 the ratings were "recalibrated" and Dancing Brave was given a revised rating of 138, now putting him second to Frankel who was rated at 140. Dancing Brave was given a rating of 140 by Timeform, placing him as the joint-seventh best racehorse of all time, now tied with horses such as Sea the Stars, Vaguely Noble, and Shergar. In 1999, The Independent described Dancing Brave as "the greatest British Flat champion of the last quarter of a century".

Dancing Brave was voted the official British Horse of the Year in 1986 by the Racegoers' Club. By taking all 27 votes in the poll he was the first horse to be unanimously elected since Brigadier Gerard in 1971.

Pat Eddery called Dancing Brave the best horse he ever rode, and a "once in a lifetime ride", while Khalid Abdullah described him as the outstanding horse to have carried his colours. Guy Harwood called him "very much the best I trained". In their book A Century of Champions, John Randall and Tony Morris rated Dancing Brave as the sixth best British racehorse of the 20th century, and the sixteenth best horse of the century trained in any country.

== Stud career ==
Dancing Brave was syndicated with an estimated value of £14m. He retired to stand as a stallion at the Dalham Hall Stud at Newmarket with an initial stud fee of £120,000. According to Tony Morris in Thoroughbred Stallions (1990), he was known to often pass on his parrot mouth to his stock. In November 1987 he was found to be suffering from Marie's disease and had fertility problems in 1988. His modest early success led to his being exported to Japan, to stand at the Shizunai Stallion Station at Hokkaidō in 1991. He died on August 2, 1999, of a heart attack.

He sired numerous winners, having a particularly good crop of three-year-olds in 1993, foaled in the year before his export, including Commander in Chief, who won The Derby and the Irish Derby, and White Muzzle, second in both the King George VI and Queen Elizabeth Stakes and the Prix de l'Arc de Triomphe. Other good winners included Wemyss Bight, Cherokee Rose and Ivanka. The best of his Japanese offspring was the filly T. M. Ocean who won the Oka Sho and the Shuka Sho in 2001. Among his other Japanese offsprings were King Halo, who won the Takamatsunomiya Kinen in 2000 and became the damsire of Equinox and Pixie Knight, as well as Kyoei March, winner of the 1997 Oka Sho and granddam of 2021 BC Distaff winner Marche Lorraine.

== Pedigree ==
Pedigree of Dancing Brave, bay stallion, 1983
Sire Lyphard (USA) 1969	Northern Dancer (CAN); 1961	Nearctic	Nearco
Sire Lyphard (USA) 1969	Northern Dancer (CAN); 1961	Nearctic	Lady Angela
Sire Lyphard (USA) 1969	Northern Dancer (CAN); 1961	Natalma	Native Dancer
Sire Lyphard (USA) 1969	Northern Dancer (CAN); 1961	Natalma	Almahmoud
Sire Lyphard (USA) 1969	Goofed (USA); 1960	Court Martial	Fair Trial
Sire Lyphard (USA) 1969	Goofed (USA); 1960	Court Martial	Instantaneous
Sire Lyphard (USA) 1969	Goofed (USA); 1960	Barra	Formor
Sire Lyphard (USA) 1969	Goofed (USA); 1960	Barra	La Favorite
Dam Navajo Princess (USA) 1974	Drone (USA); 1966	Sir Gaylord	Turn-To
Dam Navajo Princess (USA) 1974	Drone (USA); 1966	Sir Gaylord	Somethingroyal
Dam Navajo Princess (USA) 1974	Drone (USA); 1966	Cap and Bells	Tom Fool
Dam Navajo Princess (USA) 1974	Drone (USA); 1966	Cap and Bells	Ghanzi
Dam Navajo Princess (USA) 1974	Olmec (USA); 1966	Pago Pago	Matrice
Dam Navajo Princess (USA) 1974	Olmec (USA); 1966	Pago Pago	Pompilia
Dam Navajo Princess (USA) 1974	Olmec (USA); 1966	Chocolate Beau	Beau Max
Dam Navajo Princess (USA) 1974	Olmec (USA); 1966	Chocolate Beau	Otra (Family 3-d)
