= High Top =

British-bred Thoroughbred racehorse (1969–1988)

- Sire: Derring-Do
- Grandsire: Darius
- Dam: Camenae
- Damsire: Vimy
- Sex: Stallion
- Foaled: 1969
- Country: United Kingdom
- Colour: Brown
- Breeder: Bob McCreery
- Owner: Sir Jules Thorn
- Trainer: Bernard Van Cutsem
- Record: 10:5-3-0

Major wins
- Observer Gold Cup (1971); Thirsk Classic Trial (1972); 2000 Guineas (1972)

Awards
- Timeform rating: 131

Honours
- Leading broodmare sire in Great Britain and Ireland
- Last updated on 27 September 2026

High Top (1969–1988) was a British Thoroughbred racehorse and sire, best known for winning the classic 2000 Guineas in 1972. The colt was one of the leading British two-year-olds of 1971, when his successes included a defeat of a strong field in the Observer Gold Cup. After winning a trial race on his first appearance of 1972, he led from the start to beat the future Epsom Derby winner Roberto in the 2000 Guineas. This was the first of seventeen British classic winners ridden by Willie Carson. High Top never won again but finished a close second in both the Sussex Stakes and the Prix Jacques Le Marois. At the end of the year he was retired to stud and became a successful breeding stallion.

== Background ==
High Top, described as "a most commanding individual", was a brown horse with a white star four white socks bred by Bob McCreery at the Moreton Paddox Stud in Warwickshire, England. He was from the third crop of foals sired by Derring-Do, a horse whose wins included the Queen Elizabeth II Stakes in 1965 and whose other offspring included the St Leger winner Peleid and the 2000 Guineas winner Roland Gardens. High Top's dam Camenae, won one minor race, but was a successful broodmare, producing several other winners including the Jersey Stakes winner Camden Town. As a descendant of the broodmare Gentlemen's Relish, Camenae came from the same branch of Thoroughbred family 11-a which also produced the German champion Acatenango and the Prix du Jockey Club and Irish Derby winner Old Vic.

As a yearling, High Top was sent to the sales but failed to reach his reserve price. Shortly afterwards he was bought for 9,000 guineas by the Vienna-born industrialist Sir Jules Thorn. The colt was sent into training with Bernard Van Cutsem at his Stanley House stable at Newmarket, Suffolk. At the time, Van Cutsem was one of the most successful trainers in Britain, handling major winners including Park Top (King George VI and Queen Elizabeth Stakes) and Karabas (Washington, D.C. International Stakes).

== Racing career ==
=== 1971: two-year-old season ===
Racing as a two-year-old in 1972, High Top won three times from four races. After winning his debut, High Top ran in the Washington Singer Stakes at Newbury, where finished second to Yarsolav, a colt to whom he was conceding three pounds. On his final appearance of the season, the colt was sent to Doncaster Racecourse for the Group One Observer Gold Cup and started at odds of 11/2. Ridden by the Scottish jockey Willie Carson he won by three quarters of a length from Steel Pulse, a colt which went on to win the following year's Irish Derby. The unplaced horses included Boucher and Rheingold.

High Top's win at Doncaster was the culmination of an outstanding season for Van Cutsem's two-year-old colts: he had won the Dewhurst Stakes with Crowned Prince and the Middle Park Stakes with Sharpen Up. In the Free Handicap, a rating of the year's best British two-year-olds, Crowned Prince was given top weight of 133 pounds, with High Top level with Yaroslav in second place with 131.

=== 1972: three-year-old season ===
On his three-year-old debut, High Top was sent to Yorkshire to contest the Classic Trial at Thirsk Racecourse. he led from the start and won by five lengths from My Brief, with the leading filly Waterloo two lengths further back in third. High Top was Van Cutsem's sole representative in the 2000 Guineas over the Rowley Mile course at Newmarket on 29 April. With Carson again in the saddle, he started the 85/40 favourite against eleven opponents, his form having been boosted by the success of Waterloo in the 1000 Guineas two days earlier. High Top led from the start and went well clear approaching the final furlong. In the closing stages the Irish-trained colt Roberto emerged as a challenger, but the favourite was driven out by Carson to win by half a length, with a gap of six lengths back to Sun Prince in third. The colt's success was a first classic win for both Carson and Van Cutsem. High Top was strongly fancied to follow up in the Irish 2,000 Guineas but finished unplaced behind Ballymore. It was more than two months before he ran again.

In summer the colt showed good form without winning. At Goodwood in July he was beaten a head by Sallust, who set a new course record, in the Sussex Stakes. He was then sent to France for the Prix Jacques Le Marois at Deauville in August. He led in the closing stages but was caught on the line by the French colt Lyphard. On his final appearance he finished fourth behind Sallust, Lyphard and Daring Display in the Prix du Moulin at Longchamp.

== Assessment ==
The independent Timeform awarded High Top a peak rating of 131 in 1971. In their book A Century of Champions, based on a modified version of the Timeform system, John Randall and Tony Morris rated High Top an "average" winner of the 2000 Guineas.

== Stud record ==
High Top was retired to stud where he proved to be a highly successful sire of winners. Despite the fact that High Top never raced beyond a mile, many of his best offspring excelled over long distances: they included the British Classic winners Cut Above and Circus Plume as well as the Irish Oaks winner Colorspin, the Derby Italiano winner My Top and the Prix du Jockey Club winner Top Ville. He was also the damsire of Opera House, Kayf Tara, Roseate Tern, In the Groove and Classic Cliche. In 1993, largely thanks to the successes of Opera House, High Top was the Leading broodmare sire in Great Britain and Ireland.

In early 1988 High Top was standing at the Woodland Stud at Newmarket when he began to suffer from thrombosis in his hind legs. After showing signs of recovery he had a relapse and was euthanized on veterinary advice on 9 March.

== Pedigree ==
Pedigree of High Top (GB), brown stallion, 1969
Sire Derring-Do (GB) 1961	Darius (GB); 1951	Dante	Nearco
Sire Derring-Do (GB) 1961	Darius (GB); 1951	Dante	Rosy Legend
Sire Derring-Do (GB) 1961	Darius (GB); 1951	Yasna	Dastur
Sire Derring-Do (GB) 1961	Darius (GB); 1951	Yasna	Ariadne
Sire Derring-Do (GB) 1961	Sipsey Bridge (GB); 1954	Abernant	Owen Tudor
Sire Derring-Do (GB) 1961	Sipsey Bridge (GB); 1954	Abernant	Rustom Mahal
Sire Derring-Do (GB) 1961	Sipsey Bridge (GB); 1954	Claudette	Chanteur
Sire Derring-Do (GB) 1961	Sipsey Bridge (GB); 1954	Claudette	Nearly
Dam Camanae (GB) 1961	Vimy (FR); 1952	Wild Risk	Rialto
Dam Camanae (GB) 1961	Vimy (FR); 1952	Wild Risk	Wild Violet
Dam Camanae (GB) 1961	Vimy (FR); 1952	Mimi	Black Devil
Dam Camanae (GB) 1961	Vimy (FR); 1952	Mimi	Mignon
Dam Camanae (GB) 1961	Madrilene (GB); 1951	Court Martial	Fair Trial
Dam Camanae (GB) 1961	Madrilene (GB); 1951	Court Martial	Instantaneous
Dam Camanae (GB) 1961	Madrilene (GB); 1951	Marmite	Mr Jinks
Dam Camanae (GB) 1961	Madrilene (GB); 1951	Marmite	Gentlemen's Relish (Family 11-a)
