= Charlottesville (horse) =

British-bred Thoroughbred racehorse

- Sire: Prince Chevalier
- Grandsire: Prince Rose
- Dam: Noorani
- Damsire: Nearco
- Sex: Stallion
- Foaled: 1957
- Country: Great Britain
- Colour: Bay
- Breeder: Aga Khan III; Prince Aly Khan
- Owner: Prince Aly Khan; Aga Khan IV
- Trainer: Alec Head
- Record: 9 starts 6 wins

Major wins
- Prix Lupin (1960); Prix du Jockey Club (1960); Grand Prix de Paris (1960); Prix du Prince d'Orange (1960)

Awards
- Timeform rating: 135; Leading sire in Great Britain and Ireland (1966)

Charlottesville (1957 – 1 February 1972) was a British-bred, French-trained Thoroughbred racehorse. In 1960 he won the Prix Lupin, Prix du Jockey Club and Grand Prix de Paris. After retiring from racing he became Champion sire in Great Britain in 1966, the year his son Charlottown won The Derby. Charlottesville was owned by Aga Khan IV and trained by Alec Head.

== Background ==
Charlottesville was a bay colt bred by Aga Khan III and foaled in 1957. He was sired by Prince Chevalier who won the Prix du Jockey Club in 1946 and was later Champion sire in France. His dam, Noorani, was a daughter of the undefeated Grand Prix de Paris winner Nearco. After Aga Khan III's death in 1957 he was owned by his son Prince Aly Khan (who also died in 1960) and grandson (and successor) Aga Khan IV.

== Racing career ==
In 1959 Charlottesville won the Prix de Saint-Patrick. In 1960 he won the Prix Vivienne and then took the Prix Lupin, with Mincio finishing second and Atrax third. Ridden by George Moore he won the Prix du Jockey Club by three lengths from Night and Day, who was just ahead of Bonjour. On 26 June Charlottesville contested the 3000 metre Grand Prix de Paris at Longchamp in front of 100,000 people. He was entered for the Derby but was scratched. Ridden again by Moore, he was in third place as the field turned into the finishing straight and in the straight he pulled away to win by five lengths. Kires finished second and Eranchild third. He then won the Prix du Prince d'Orange, before finishing sixth behind winner Puissant Chef in the Prix de l'Arc de Triomphe.

== Assessment ==
Timeform rated Charlottesville at 135 in 1960, making him the top three-year-old the season, and equal with Floribunda as the highest-rated horse of any age.

== Stud career ==
Charlottesville was retired in November 1960 and first stood at the Aga Khan's Ballymany Stud in County Kildare, Ireland for an 8,000 guinea fee. He became a successful stallion and was the leading sire in Great Britain and Ireland in 1966. He sired Charlottown who won The Derby and Coronation Cup. He also sired Irish Oaks winner Gaia, Grosser Preis von Baden and Gran Premio di Milano winner Stratford and Derby Italiano winner Bonconte di Montefeltro. Charlottesville died on 1 February 1972 at age 15 of heart failure.

== Sire line tree ==
- Charlottesville
  - Charlottown
  - Pigalle
  - Stratford
  - Canterbury
  - Bonconte Di Montefeltro
  - Magna Carta
  - Biskra
  - Jefferson
    - Son of Love
  - Saunter
    - Winsome Andante

== Pedigree ==
Pedigree of Charlottesville, bay stallion, 1957
Sire Prince Chevalier (FR) b. 1943	Prince Rose (GB) b. 1928	Rose Prince b. 1919	Prince Palatine
Sire Prince Chevalier (FR) b. 1943	Prince Rose (GB) b. 1928	Rose Prince b. 1919	Eglantine
Sire Prince Chevalier (FR) b. 1943	Prince Rose (GB) b. 1928	Indolence b. 1920	Gay Crusader
Sire Prince Chevalier (FR) b. 1943	Prince Rose (GB) b. 1928	Indolence b. 1920	Barrier
Sire Prince Chevalier (FR) b. 1943	Chevalerie (FR) b. 1933	Abbot's Speed br. 1923	Abbots Trace
Sire Prince Chevalier (FR) b. 1943	Chevalerie (FR) b. 1933	Abbot's Speed br. 1923	Mary Gaunt
Sire Prince Chevalier (FR) b. 1943	Chevalerie (FR) b. 1933	Kassala b. 1926	Cylgad
Sire Prince Chevalier (FR) b. 1943	Chevalerie (FR) b. 1933	Kassala b. 1926	Farizade
Dam Noorani ch. 1950	Nearco (ITY) br. 1935	Pharos b. 1920	Phalaris
Dam Noorani ch. 1950	Nearco (ITY) br. 1935	Pharos b. 1920	Scapa Flow
Dam Noorani ch. 1950	Nearco (ITY) br. 1935	Nogara b. 1928	Havresac II
Dam Noorani ch. 1950	Nearco (ITY) br. 1935	Nogara b. 1928	Catnip
Dam Noorani ch. 1950	Empire Glory b. 1933	Singapore ch. 1922	Gainsborough
Dam Noorani ch. 1950	Empire Glory b. 1933	Singapore ch. 1922	Tetrabbazia
Dam Noorani ch. 1950	Empire Glory b. 1933	Skyglory ch. 1922	Sky-Rocket
Dam Noorani ch. 1950	Empire Glory b. 1933	Skyglory ch. 1922	Simone

Note: b. = Bay, br. = Brown, ch. = Chestnut
