= Triptych (horse) =

American-bred Thoroughbred racehorse

- Sire: Riverman
- Grandsire: Never Bend
- Dam: Trillion
- Damsire: Hail To Reason
- Sex: Mare
- Foaled: 19 April 1982
- Country: United States
- Colour: Bay
- Breeder: Nelson Bunker Hunt & Edward L. Stevenson
- Owner: Alan Clore; Peter M. Brant
- Trainer: David Smaga; David O'Brien; Patrick Biancone
- Record: 41: 14-19-8
- Earnings: £1,500,000

Major wins
- Prix Marcel Boussac (1984); Irish 2,000 Guineas (1985); La Coupe (1986); Champion Stakes (1986, 1987); Prix Ganay (1987); Coronation Cup (1987, 1988); International Stakes (1987); Irish Champion Stakes (1987); Prix du Prince d'Orange (1988); Timeform rating: 132
- Last updated on 28 August 2024

Triptych (1982–1989) was an American-bred, Irish-trained Thoroughbred racehorse who won multiple top-class races over five seasons in three European countries. She earned over £1.5 million in prize money. Triptych died in a freak accident in 1989 when in foal.

== Background ==
Triptych was a dark bay mare bred in Kentucky by Nelson Bunker Hunt & Edward L. Stevenson. She was sired by Riverman an American-bred French-trained horse who won the Poule d'Essai des Poulains in 1972. As a breeding stallion he was highly successful, being the sire of many important winners including Irish River, Bahri, Gold River, River Memories and Detroit.

She was consigned to the 1983 Keeneland Sales summer yearling auction, where she was purchased for US$2.15 million by an agent for Alan Clore.

== Racing career ==
Triptych ran 41 times and won 18 races; of those, 12 were Pattern races, including nine Group 1 events. She was placed another 19 times, all but one of them in Group 1 races, and her worldwide earnings amounted to more than £1,500,500. Her first big win came in the 1984 Prix Marcel Boussac, when she was trained by David Smaga in France, but she moved to David O'Brien in Ireland for her second season when she became the first filly to win the Irish 2,000 Guineas at the Curragh, was runner-up in The Oaks to Oh So Sharp and third to Commanche Run and Oh So Sharp in the Benson and Hedges Gold Cup (now the International Stakes) at York.

At age four in 1986, Triptych won the Champion Stakes and La Coupe, by which time she had joined Patrick Biancone. She was placed in the King George VI and Queen Elizabeth Stakes, Eclipse Stakes and Prix de l'Arc de Triomphe. In 1987, she won the Coronation Cup (which she also won in 1988), Prix Ganay, Champion Stakes (both English and Irish versions) and International Stakes. She was sent to race in the United States, where she made one start at Churchill Downs in Kentucky and was then retired to broodmare duty on November 7, 1988.

== Retirement ==
Sent to stud in 1989, she died as a result of a freak accident when she ran into a stud farm vehicle. She was in foal to Mr. Prospector at the time.

== Pedigree ==
Pedigree of Triptych (USA), brown mare, 1982
Sire Riverman (USA) 1969	Never Bend (USA); 1960	Nasrullah	Nearco
Sire Riverman (USA) 1969	Never Bend (USA); 1960	Nasrullah	Mumtaz Begum
Sire Riverman (USA) 1969	Never Bend (USA); 1960	Lalun	Djeddah
Sire Riverman (USA) 1969	Never Bend (USA); 1960	Lalun	Be Faithful
Sire Riverman (USA) 1969	River Lady (USA); 1963	Prince John	Princequillo
Sire Riverman (USA) 1969	River Lady (USA); 1963	Prince John	Not Afraid
Sire Riverman (USA) 1969	River Lady (USA); 1963	Nile Lily	Roman
Sire Riverman (USA) 1969	River Lady (USA); 1963	Nile Lily	Azalea
Dam Trillion (USA) 1974	Hail To Reason (USA); 1958	Turn-To	Royal Charger
Dam Trillion (USA) 1974	Hail To Reason (USA); 1958	Turn-To	Source Sucree
Dam Trillion (USA) 1974	Hail To Reason (USA); 1958	Nothirdchance	Blue Swords
Dam Trillion (USA) 1974	Hail To Reason (USA); 1958	Nothirdchance	Galla Colors
Dam Trillion (USA) 1974	Margarethen (USA); 1962	Tulyar	Tehran
Dam Trillion (USA) 1974	Margarethen (USA); 1962	Tulyar	Neocracy
Dam Trillion (USA) 1974	Margarethen (USA); 1962	Russ-Marie	Nasrullah
Dam Trillion (USA) 1974	Margarethen (USA); 1962	Russ-Marie	Marguery (Family 4-n)
