= Derring-Do =

British-bred Thoroughbred racehorse

- Sire: Darius
- Grandsire: Dante
- Dam: Sipsey Bridge
- Damsire: Abernant
- Sex: Stallion
- Foaled: 1961
- Country: United Kingdom
- Colour: Bay
- Breeder: Burton Agnes Stud
- Owner: Mrs H H Renshaw
- Trainer: Arthur Budgett
- Record: 14:6-3-1 (incomplete)

Major wins
- Imperial Stakes (1963); Cornwallis Stakes (1963); Hungerford Stakes (1964); Valdoe Stakes (1965); Queen Elizabeth II Stakes (1965)

Awards
- Timeform rating 131

Derring-Do (1961–January 1978) was a British Thoroughbred racehorse and sire. He was one of the leading British two-year-olds of 1963 when he won two of his three races including the Cornwallis Stakes. In the next two seasons, he developed into a top class racehorse over distances between seven and ten furlongs with his most important wins coming in the Hungerford Stakes, Valdoe Stakes, and Queen Elizabeth II Stakes. He was retired to stud at the end of his four-year-old season and became a successful breeding stallion.

== Background ==
Derring-Do was a bay horse with no white markings bred by the Burton Agnes Stud in East Yorkshire. He was sired by Darius who won the 2000 Guineas in 1954 and the Eclipse Stakes a year later. Darius's other progeny included The Oaks winner Pia and the Poule d'Essai des Pouliches winner Pola Bella. Derring-Do's dam Sipsey Bridge won two minor races and was a granddaughter of Nearly, a broodmare whose other descendants included Doyoun and Alexandrova.

As a yearling, Derring-Do was offered for sale and bought for 1,200 guineas by representatives of Mrs H Renshaw. The colt was sent into training with Arthur Budgett at Whatcombe in Oxfordshire. He was ridden in most of his races by the Australian jockey Scobie Breasley.

== Racing career ==
=== 1963: two-year-old season ===
On his first appearance as a two-year-old, Derring-Do was entered in the valuable National Stakes over five furlongs at Sandown Park Racecourse. He finished second to the Irish filly Pourparler, who went on to win the following year's 1000 Guineas. He was then moved up in distance for the Imperial Stakes over six furlongs at Kempton Park Racecourse and won from Whistling Buoy. On his final appearance of the season he returned to five furlongs for the Cornwallis Stakes at Kempton in September. Ridden by Breasley he started the 8/13 and won narrowly from the filly Golden Apollo.

=== 1964: three-year-old season ===
Derring-Do raced five times as a three-year-old in 1964. At Goodwood Racecourse in July he finished second to Roan Rocket in the Sussex Stakes. He then recorded his only victory of the season when winning the Hungerford Stakes over seven furlongs at Newbury Racecourse where he started at odds of 2/1. In September he finished second to the Irish four-year-old Linacre in the Queen Elizabeth II Stakes at Ascot Racecourse.

=== 1965: four-year-old season ===
As a four-year-old, Derring-Do won three of his six races. He won the Cavendish Stakes at Sandown and finished third behind White Fire in the Prix Quincey at Deauville Racecourse. In September he was moved up in distance to contest the Valdoe Stakes over ten furlongs at Goodwood and won at odds of 4/11. Later that month he ran for the second time in the Queen Elizabeth II Stakes. Ridden as usual by Breasley, he started at odds of 9/4 and won from Ballyciptic and Minor Portion.

== Assessment ==
Derring-Do was given a rating of 131 by the independent Timeform organisation in 1963, two pounds behind the top-rated two-year-old colts Santa Claus and Showdown. In the Free Handicap, a rating of the best two-year-olds to race in Britain in 1963, he was assigned a weight of 130 pounds, three pounds below the top weight Tallahassee.

== Stud career ==
At the end of his racing career, Derring-Do was retired to stud and became a successful breeding stallion. The most notable of his offspring was High Top, who won the 2000 Guineas in 1972 and became a very successful sire of winners. He had a second classic winner in 1973 when Peleid won the St Leger Stakes and a third when Roland Gardens won the 2000 Guineas in 1978. The best of his daughters was Stilvi, a sprinter who won the Duke of York Stakes and the King George Stakes. Stilvi became an outstanding broodmare, producing several major winners including Tachypous (Middle Park Stakes), Tromos (Dewhurst Stakes), Tolmi (Coronation Stakes) and Tyrnavos Irish Derby. Other important winners sired by Derring-Do included Huntercombe (July Cup, Nunthorpe Stakes) and Jan Ekels (Queen Elizabeth II Stakes). Derring-Do was euthanised after being injured in a paddock accident in January 1978.

== Pedigree ==
Pedigree of Derring-Do (GB), bay stallion, 1961
Sire Darius (GB) 1951	Dante (GB); 1942	Nearco	Pharos
Sire Darius (GB) 1951	Dante (GB); 1942	Nearco	Nogara
Sire Darius (GB) 1951	Dante (GB); 1942	Rosy Legend	Dark Legend
Sire Darius (GB) 1951	Dante (GB); 1942	Rosy Legend	Rosy Cheeks
Sire Darius (GB) 1951	Yasna (GB); 1936	Dastur	Solario
Sire Darius (GB) 1951	Yasna (GB); 1936	Dastur	Friar's Daughter
Sire Darius (GB) 1951	Yasna (GB); 1936	Ariadne	Arion
Sire Darius (GB) 1951	Yasna (GB); 1936	Ariadne	Security
Dam Sipsey Bridge (GB) 1954	Abernant (GB); 1946	Owen Tudor	Hyperion
Dam Sipsey Bridge (GB) 1954	Abernant (GB); 1946	Owen Tudor	Mary Tudor
Dam Sipsey Bridge (GB) 1954	Abernant (GB); 1946	Rustom Mahal	Rustom Pasha
Dam Sipsey Bridge (GB) 1954	Abernant (GB); 1946	Rustom Mahal	Mumtaz Mahal
Dam Sipsey Bridge (GB) 1954	Claudette (GB); 1949	Chanteur	Chateau Bouscaut
Dam Sipsey Bridge (GB) 1954	Claudette (GB); 1949	Chanteur	La Diva
Dam Sipsey Bridge (GB) 1954	Claudette (GB); 1949	Nearly	Nearco
Dam Sipsey Bridge (GB) 1954	Claudette (GB); 1949	Nearly	Lost Soul (Family 21-a)

- Derring-Do was inbred 3 x 4 to Nearco, meaning that this stallion appears in both the third and fourth generations of his pedigree.
