= Vimy (horse) =

French-bred Thoroughbred racehorse

- Sire: Wild Risk
- Grandsire: Rialto
- Dam: Mimi
- Damsire: Black Devil
- Sex: Stallion
- Foaled: 1952
- Country: France
- Colour: Bay
- Breeder: Pierre Wertheimer
- Owner: Pierre Wertheimer
- Trainer: Alec Head
- Record: 6: 4–1–0

Major wins
- Prix Noailles (1955); King George VI and Queen Elizabeth Stakes (1955)

Awards
- Timeform rating 132

Vimy (1952 – 11 August 1980) was a French Thoroughbred racehorse and sire best known for winning the 1955 King George VI and Queen Elizabeth Stakes. Racing in France, Vimy won three of his five races including the Prix Noailles as well as finishing second in the Prix du Jockey Club. In July he became the first French horse to win the King George on his first and only race in Britain. He was retired from racing after his win at Ascot and stood as a stallion in Ireland before being exported to Japan in 1964.

== Background ==
Vimy was a bay horse with a narrow white stripe bred in France by this owner, Pierre Wertheimer. His dam, Mimi, also produced Midget, a grey mare who won five races now classed as Group One including the Prix de la Forêt and the Queen Elizabeth II Stakes and was the grand-dam of the 1000 Guineas winner Ma Biche. His sire Wild Risk, a male-line descendant of St. Simon had his greatest success over hurdles, being a dual winner of the Grande Course de Haies d'Auteuil. He became a successful stallion, siring Le Fabuleux (Prix du Jockey Club), Balto (Ascot Gold Cup, Grand Prix de Paris) and Worden (Washington, D.C. International Stakes). Wertheimer sent Vimy into training with Alec Head at Chantilly.

== Racing career ==
Vimy ran twice as a two-year-old in 1954. He won one race over 1300 metres and was reportedly unlucky in the other, having been left behind at the start. On his three-year-old debut in April 1955 he was sent to Maisons-Laffitte Racecourse for the Prix Lagrange over 2000m. He ran a dead-heat for first place with Nordic ahead of Zinosca in third. His next race was the Prix Noailles over 2200m at Longchamp Racecourse. Ridden by Jean Massard, Vimy won the race, a trial for the Prix du Jockey Club, beating Zinosca.

At Chantilly Racecourse in June, Vimy was narrowly defeated in the Prix du Jockey Club, beaten a short head by Rapace: Wertheimer claimed that his colt was an unlucky loser, and he was reported to be unsuited by the heavy ground. In July, the colt was sent to England to contest Britain's most prestigious all-aged race, the King George VI and Queen Elizabeth Stakes at Ascot Racecourse. The prize money of over £23,000 made it the most valuable race run in Britain in 1955: that year's Epsom Derby was worth £18,702. Ridden by Roger Poincelet, the French colt started at odds of 10/1 in a field of ten runners, with the Derby winner Phil Drake starting the odds-on favourite. Doug Smith attempted to make all the running on the British three-year-old Acropolis, and held a clear lead early in the straight, whilst Poincelet appeared to be in a hopeless position on Vimy. Once Vimy obtained a clear run, however, he made rapid progress to catch the leader inside the final furlong, and although Acropolis rallied, the French challenger prevailed by a head, and became the first foreign entry to win the King George.

Future targets mentioned for Vimy after his success at Ascot included the St Leger and the Washington D. C. International but he never raced after Ascot and was retired to stud.

== Assessment ==
The independent Timeform organisation gave Vimy a rating of 132 in 1955, seven pounds below the top-rated Pappa Fourway.

In their book, A Century of Champions, based on the Timeform rating system, John Randall and Tony Morris rated Vimy an "inferior" winner of the King George.

== Stud record ==
Vimy began his career as a stallion at the Irish National Stud. The best of his European offspring was Khalkis, who won the Eclipse Stakes in 1963 and was narrowly beaten by Relko in the following year's Coronation Cup. His daughters included some good broodmares, and he was the damsire of the British Horse of the Year Busted and the 2000 Guineas winner High Top. In 1964 Vimy was sold and exported to Japan. He died on 11 August 1980.

== Pedigree ==
Pedigree of Vimy (FR), bay stallion, 1952
Sire Wild Risk (FR) 1940	Rialto; 1923	Rabelais	St Simon
Sire Wild Risk (FR) 1940	Rialto; 1923	Rabelais	Satirical
Sire Wild Risk (FR) 1940	Rialto; 1923	La Grelee	Helicon
Sire Wild Risk (FR) 1940	Rialto; 1923	La Grelee	Grignouse
Sire Wild Risk (FR) 1940	Wild Violet; 1935	Blandford	Swynford
Sire Wild Risk (FR) 1940	Wild Violet; 1935	Blandford	Blanche
Sire Wild Risk (FR) 1940	Wild Violet; 1935	Wood Violet	Ksar*
Sire Wild Risk (FR) 1940	Wild Violet; 1935	Wood Violet	Pervencheres
Dam Mimi (GB) 1943	Black Devil; 1931	Sir Gallahad III	Teddy
Dam Mimi (GB) 1943	Black Devil; 1931	Sir Gallahad III	Plucky Liege
Dam Mimi (GB) 1943	Black Devil; 1931	La Palina	Ambassador
Dam Mimi (GB) 1943	Black Devil; 1931	La Palina	Parthenis
Dam Mimi (GB) 1943	Mignon; 1935	Épinard	Badajoz
Dam Mimi (GB) 1943	Mignon; 1935	Épinard	Epine Blanche
Dam Mimi (GB) 1943	Mignon; 1935	Mammee	Bruleur*
Dam Mimi (GB) 1943	Mignon; 1935	Mammee	Mackwiller (Family:1-u)

* Vimy is inbred 5S x 4D to the stallion Bruleur, meaning that he appears fifth generation (via Ksar) on the sire side of his pedigree and fourth generation on the dam side of his pedigree.
