= Relko =

French-bred Thoroughbred racehorse

- Racing silks of Haras d'Ouilly
- Sire: Tanerko
- Grandsire: Tantieme
- Dam: Relance
- Damsire: Relic
- Sex: Stallion
- Foaled: 1960
- Country: France
- Colour: Bay
- Breeder: François Dupré
- Owner: Haras d'Ouilly
- Trainer: François Mathet
- Record: 13: 9-2-0
- Earnings: £151,787

Major wins
- Prix de Guiche (1963); Poule d'Essai des Poulains (1963); Prix Royal-Oak (1963); Epsom Derby (1963); Prix Ganay (1964); Grand Prix de Saint-Cloud (1964); Coronation Cup (1964)

Awards
- Timeform rating: 136
- Last updated on 31 May 2022

Relko (1960–1982) was a French Thoroughbred racehorse and sire. In a racing career which lasted from 1962 until 1964 he ran thirteen times and won nine races. His most notable win came in the 1963 Derby.

== Background ==
Relko was a "strong, compact, perfectly balanced" bay horse standing just over 16.1 hands high with a narrow white stripe and three white socks. He was bred by his owner François Dupré at his stud farm in Pont-d'Ouilly in the Basse-Normandie region. Relko was one of three outstanding colts produced by the broodmare Relance, the others being Match II and Reliance (Prix du Jockey Club). He was sired by the Grand Prix de Saint-Cloud winner Tanerko, a representative of the Teddy sire line. Relko was trained by Chantilly by François Mathet, who had previously handled the 1955 Derby winner Phil Drake.

== Racing career ==
=== 1962: two-year-old season ===
Relko began his racing career by winning the Prix Gladiator over 1100m at Le Tremblay and then won the Prix Isard at Maisons-Laffitte. He was beaten into second place by the filly Neptune's Doll when favoured to win the Critérium de Maisons-Laffitte and then finished fourth to Hula Dancer in the Grand Critérium. On his final start of the year Relko finished second in the Prix Thomas Bryon.

=== 1963: three-year-old season ===
In the spring of 1963, Relko won the Prix de Guiche and the Poule d'Essai des Poulains at Longchamp and was then aimed at The Derby.

At Epsom on 29 May, Relko was sent off the 5/1 favourite in a field of twenty-six runners. Ridden by the 21-year-old Yves Saint-Martin, Relko tracked the leading group in the early stages before moving up into third place early in the straight. He was moved up to take the lead from Tarqogan three furlongs from the finish and pulled away from the rest of the field to win easily by six lengths from Merchant Venturer and Ragusa. The slow winning time of 2:39.4 was explained by the rain-softened state of the turf.

Relko's Derby win was overshadowed for some time because of the revelation by the Daily Express that he had failed a drugs test. The incident took place in the context of a series of investigations into the "doping" of horses in British races. It was not until October that the Jockey Club confirmed Relko as the winner, stating that the substances detected could not be positively identified and therefore could not be proved to have affected the result. At the end of June, Relko was scheduled to run in the Irish Derby and made 11/8 favourite, but was withdrawn from the race minutes before the start, after appearing to be lame, leading to further suspicions of foul play.

In autumn, Relko returned to the racecourse to record an impressive win in the Prix Royal Oak on 15 September, easily defeating Sanctus, the winner of the Prix du Jockey Club and the Grand Prix de Paris. In the Prix de l'Arc de Triomphe, Relko became highly agitated before the start and ran poorly, finishing sixth behind Exbury.

=== 1964: four-year-old season ===
Relko was unbeaten in three starts as a four-year-old. He began by winning the Prix Ganay at Longchamp and then returned to Epsom where he won the Coronation Cup on heavy ground in June. On his final start he won the Grand Prix de Saint-Cloud in July.

== Assessment ==
In their book A Century of Champions, John Randall and Tony Morris rated Relko the fifteenth best French horse of the 20th Century and the second best Derby winner of the 1960s. Timeform gave Relko an end of season rating of 136.

== Stud record ==
After winning a number of important races in France and in England, Relko was retired in September 1964 after a fetlock injury. In 1965, he was sent to stand at the Lavington stud in England. Although he was a top-class sire of middle-and-long distance horses, including Relkino, Give Thanks, Olwyn, Floyd and Lanfranco, he had little success as a sire of sires. Of his daughters, My Sierra Leone produced the Champion filly Royal Heroine who won the inaugural running of the Breeders' Cup Mile in North American record time. Relko died on 30 March 1982 and was buried at the Malthouse Stud in Berkshire.

== Pedigree ==
Pedigree of Relko (FR), bay stallion, 1960
Sire Tanerko (FR) 1953	Tantieme; 1947	Deux-Pour-Cent	Deiri
Sire Tanerko (FR) 1953	Tantieme; 1947	Deux-Pour-Cent	Dix Pour Cent
Sire Tanerko (FR) 1953	Tantieme; 1947	Terka	Indus
Sire Tanerko (FR) 1953	Tantieme; 1947	Terka	La Furka
Sire Tanerko (FR) 1953	La Divine; 1943	Fair Copy	Fairway
Sire Tanerko (FR) 1953	La Divine; 1943	Fair Copy	Composure
Sire Tanerko (FR) 1953	La Divine; 1943	La Diva	Blue Skies
Sire Tanerko (FR) 1953	La Divine; 1943	La Diva	La Traviata
Dam Relance (FR) 1952	Relic; 1945	War Relic	Man o' War
Dam Relance (FR) 1952	Relic; 1945	War Relic	Friars Carse
Dam Relance (FR) 1952	Relic; 1945	Bridal Colors	Black Toney
Dam Relance (FR) 1952	Relic; 1945	Bridal Colors	Vaila
Dam Relance (FR) 1952	Polaire; 1947	Le Volcan	Tourbillon
Dam Relance (FR) 1952	Polaire; 1947	Le Volcan	Eroica
Dam Relance (FR) 1952	Polaire; 1947	Stella Polaris	Papyrus
Dam Relance (FR) 1952	Polaire; 1947	Stella Polaris	Crepuscule (Family: 16)
