= Reliance (horse) =

French-bred Thoroughbred racehorse

- Sire: Tantieme
- Grandsire: Deux-Pour-Cent
- Dam: Relance
- Damsire: Relic
- Sex: Stallion
- Foaled: 11 April 1962
- Country: France
- Colour: Bay
- Breeder: François Dupré
- Owner: François Dupré
- Trainer: François Mathet
- Record: 6: 5–1–0

Major wins
- Prix Hocquart (1965); Prix du Jockey Club (1965); Grand Prix de Paris (1965); Prix Royal Oak (1965)

Awards
- Timeform rating 137

Reliance (11 April 1962 – August 1979) was a French Thoroughbred racehorse and sire. Unraced as a two-year-old, Reliance won his first five races as a three-year-old in 1965 including the Prix du Jockey Club, Grand Prix de Paris, and Prix Royal Oak. He sustained his only defeat when finishing second to Sea-Bird in the Prix de l'Arc de Triomphe. He was then retired to stud, where he had some success as a sire of winners.

== Background ==
Reliance was a bay colt bred in France by his owner François Dupré. He was sired by Dupre's stallion Tantieme the double winner of the Prix de l'Arc de Triomphe who went on to be the champion sire in France in 1962 and 1965. His dam was the outstanding broodmare Relance, who had previously produced the King George VI and Queen Elizabeth Stakes winner Match and The Derby winner Relko. Reliance was trained at Chantilly by François Mathet and ridden in his races by Yves Saint-Martin.

== Racing career ==
Reliance was not raced as a two-year-old and made his debut when winning the Prix Moronniers in April 1965. He was then moved up in class for the Prix Hocquart, a trial race for the Prix du Jockey Club, run over 2,400 metres at Longchamp Racecourse in May. He won the race, defeating the Critérium de Saint-Cloud winner Carvin.

With the outstanding French colt Sea-Bird engaged in The Derby Reliance started the 1/2 favourite for the Prix du Jockey Club over 2400m at Chantilly Racecourse in June. Reliance won by three-quarters of a length from Diatome, a colt who went on to win the Washington, D.C. International Stakes later that year, with Carvin third. Three weeks later, Reliance moved up in distance for the Grand Prix de Paris over 3000m at Longchamp. He started the 11/10 favourite and won by a length, with Diatome again taking second.

After a two-month break, Reliance prepared for a meeting with Sea-Bird by running in the 3,100m Prix Royal-Oak at Longchamp in September. He took his unbeaten record to five by beating the Irish-trained Ragazzo, the winner of the Great Voltigeur Stakes on his previous start. The Prix de l'Arc de Triomphe attracted a strong international field, with the usual strong challenges from Britain, Italy, and Ireland augmented by the presence of Tom Rolfe from the United States and Anilin from the Soviet Union. Reliance tracked the leaders on the inside rail before moving up to challenge for the lead in the straight. Although he was unable to cope with the speed of Sea Bird, who drew clear in the closing stages to win by six lengths, Reliance finished five lengths clear of the other runners, who were headed by Diatome.

== Assessment ==
The independent Timeform organisation awarded Reliance a rating of 137 in 1965. In the 1960s only Sea Bird (145), Vaguely Noble (140 in 1968) and Exbury (138 in 1963) were ranked more highly.

In their book, A Century of Champions, based on the Timeform rating system, John Randall and Tony Morris rated Reliance the eleventh best French racehorse of the 20th century, and placed him fifty-fifth in their global ranking.

== Stud record ==
Reliance was based in England for his stud career, standing at the Harwood Stud in Newbury, Berkshire. He had his greatest success as a sire of stayers, with his progeny including Proverb (Chester Vase, Goodwood Cup, Doncaster Cup), Recupere (Prix du Cadran) and Tug of War (Goodwood Cup). He was also the sire of the broodmare Doubly Sure, the dam of Kris, Diesis, Keen, Rudimentary and Presidium. Other daughters produced the champion sprinter Moorestyle, the Ascot Gold Cup winner Longboat, and the St. James's Palace Stakes winner Persian Heights. Reliance was euthanised in August 1979 after suffering from a chronic sinus condition.

== Pedigree ==
Pedigree of Reliance (FR), bay stallion, 1962
Sire Tantieme (FR) 1947	Deux-Pour-Cent; 1941	Deiri	Aethelstan
Sire Tantieme (FR) 1947	Deux-Pour-Cent; 1941	Deiri	Desra
Sire Tantieme (FR) 1947	Deux-Pour-Cent; 1941	Dix Pour Cent	Feridoon
Sire Tantieme (FR) 1947	Deux-Pour-Cent; 1941	Dix Pour Cent	La Chansonnerie
Sire Tantieme (FR) 1947	Terka; 1942	Indus	Alcantara
Sire Tantieme (FR) 1947	Terka; 1942	Indus	Himalaya
Sire Tantieme (FR) 1947	Terka; 1942	La Furka	Blandford
Sire Tantieme (FR) 1947	Terka; 1942	La Furka	Branta
Dam Relance (FR) 1952	Relic; 1945	War Relic	Man o' War
Dam Relance (FR) 1952	Relic; 1945	War Relic	Friars Carse
Dam Relance (FR) 1952	Relic; 1945	Bridal Colors	Black Toney
Dam Relance (FR) 1952	Relic; 1945	Bridal Colors	Vaila
Dam Relance (FR) 1952	Polaire; 1947	Le Volcan	Tourbillon
Dam Relance (FR) 1952	Polaire; 1947	Le Volcan	Eroica
Dam Relance (FR) 1952	Polaire; 1947	Stella Polaris	Papyrus
Dam Relance (FR) 1952	Polaire; 1947	Stella Polaris	Crepuscule (Family:16-h)
