= François Dupré =

- Dupré in 1953
- Born: François Louis Jules Dupré; 3 December 1888; Paris, France
- Died: 26 June 1966 (aged 77); Jamaica
- Occupations: Hotelier, art collector, racehorse owner/breeder
- Known for: Haras d'Ouilly
- Spouse: 2) Anna Stefanna Nagy

François Louis Jules Dupré (French pronunciation: [fʁɑ̃swa lwi ʒyl dypʁe]; 3 December 1888 – 26 June 1966) was a French, hotelier, art collector, and owner of the Thoroughbred horse breeding and racing farm, Haras d'Ouilly in Pont-d'Ouilly. He was a grandson of the painter Jules Dupré.

Dupré served in the French Army during World War I. Seriously wounded during battle, he was hospitalized for a considerable length of time. He went on to a career in business that saw him become the owner of two luxury hotels in Paris, the prestigious Hotel George V, Paris and the Hotel Plaza Athenée. In addition, in 1947, Dupré acquired the Hotel Ritz in Montreal, Canada. In 1937, while traveling by passenger liner across the Atlantic, Dupré met twenty-five-year-old Anna Stefanna Nagy who would become his second wife.

== Thoroughbred horse racing ==
Dupré was friends with Duke Louis Decazes, a Thoroughbred racehorse enthusiast who owned the Haras d'Ouilly stud farm in Pont-d'Ouilly, Calvados. Beginning in 1921, the two partnered in several racehorses and in 1930 Dupré purchased the Haras d'Ouilly property. He became one of Europe's leading breeders and owners, winning numerous important conditions races in France and England. His horse Tantième had back-to-back wins in the Prix de l'Arc de Triomphe in 1950 and '51, and in 1963 Relko won The Derby.

=== Major horse races won ===
Races in France:

- Prix de l'Arc de Triomphe
  - Tantième
- Prix de l'Abbaye de Longchamp
  - Texana (1957)
  - Fortino (1962)
  - Texanita (1963 & 1964)
- Grand Prix de Paris
  - Danseur (1966)
- Grand Prix de Saint-Cloud
  - Match (1962)
- Poule d'Essai des Pouliches
  - Virgule (1954)
  - Solitude (1961)
  - La Sega (1962)
  - Bella Paola (1968) raced by Madame Dupré
  - Koblenza (1969) raced by Madame Dupré
- Poule d'Essai des Poulains
  - Relko (1963)
- Prix du Jockey Club
  - Reliance (1965)
  - Rheffic (1971) raced by Madame Dupré
- Prix Noailles
  - Tanerko (1956)
  - Match (1961)
- Prix Royal-Oak
  - Match (1961)

Races in England:

- 1,000 Guineas (Newmarket Racecourse)
  - Bella Paola (1968) raced by Madame Dupré
- Epsom Derby
  - Relko (1963)
- Coronation Cup
  - Relko (1964)
- King George VI and Queen Elizabeth Stakes
  - Match (1962)

Races in the United States:

- Washington, D.C. International Stakes
  - Match (1962)

== Death ==
François Dupré died in 1966 at his estate in Jamaica. His widow Anna ran the racing operation until 1977 when she sold the entire bloodstock for £1.3 million to the Aga Khan IV. The Dupré's famous colors of gray with a pink cap were taken over by Jean-Luc Lagardère who would buy Haras d'Ouilly in 1981.
