= Prix Hocquart =

French Group 2 flat horse race

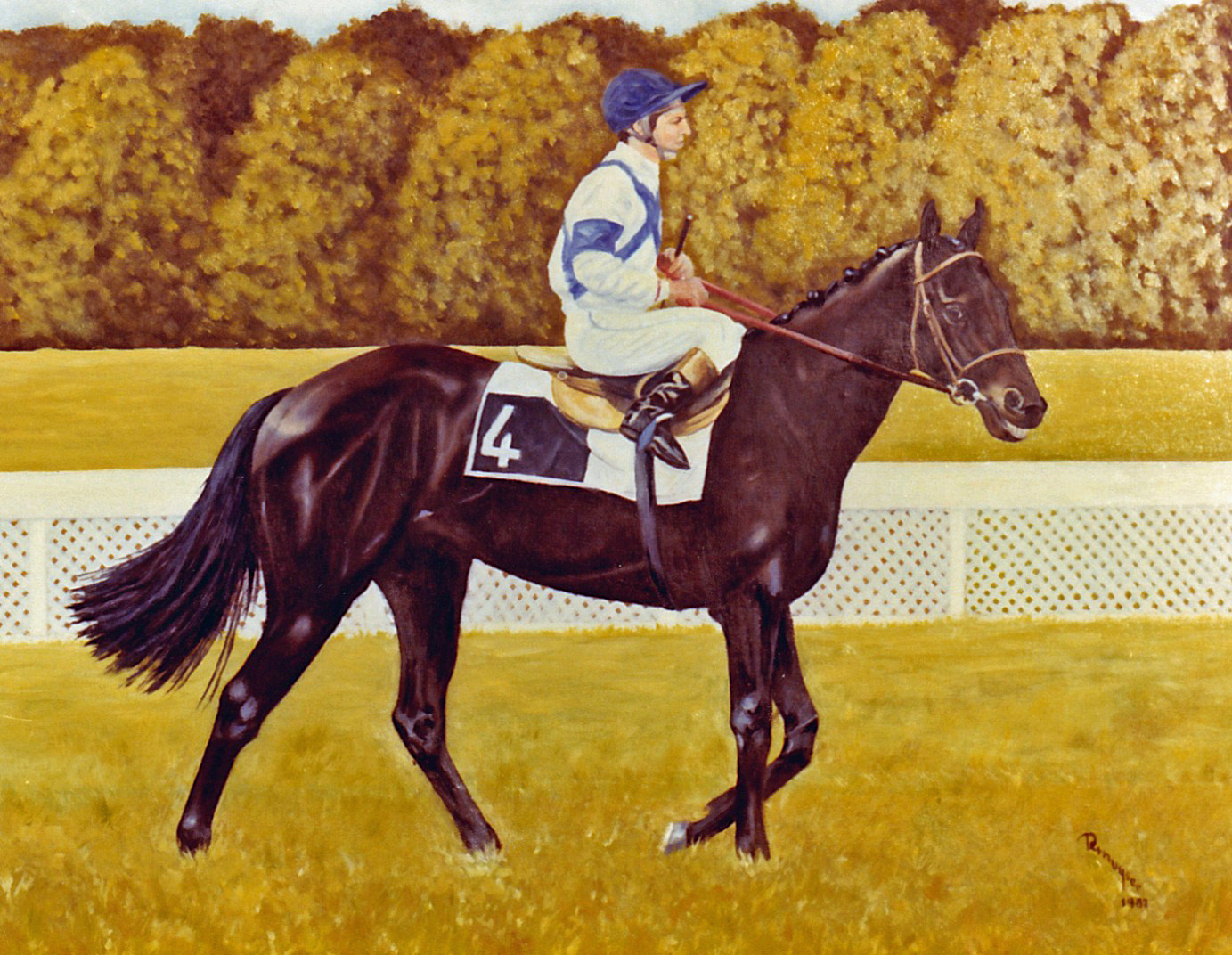
- Cadoudal, oil on canvas Painting by Bob Demuyser (1920–2003)
- Class: Group 3
- Location: Chantilly Racecourse; Paris, France
- Inaugurated: 1861; 165 years ago
- Race type: Flat / Thoroughbred
- Website: france-galop.com

Race information
- Distance: 2,200 metres (1mi 3fur)
- Surface: Turf
- Track: Right-handed
- Qualification: Three-year-olds excluding geldings
- Weight: 58 kg Allowances; 1½ kg for fillies
- Purse: €130,000 (2022); 1st: €74,100

Prix Hocquart
2022
| L'Astronome | Galaxie Gold | Lavello |

Previous years
2021
| Bubble Gift | Gregolimo | Lambo |

2020-2011
2020
Port Guillaume | Ketil | Pao Alto
2019
Al Hilalee | Soft Light | Khagan
2018
Nocturnal Fox | Al Malhouf | Hush Writer
2017
Ice Breeze | Shakeel | Falcon Wings
2016
Mekhtaal | Thewayyouwish | Royal Julius
2015
Ampere | Gorgeous King | Canndal
2014
Free Port Lux | Adelaide | Gallante
2013
Tableaux | Park Reel | Festive Cheer
2012
Top Trip | Masterstroke | Sir Jade
2011
Prairie Star | Grand Vent | Genius Beast

2010–2001
2010
Silver Pond | Celtic Celeb | Ivory Land
2009
Wajir | Telluride | Claremont
2008
Democrate | Starlish | Blue Bresil
2007
Anton Chekhov | Royal And Regal | Shujoon
2006
Numide | Gentlewave | Sudan
2005
Hurricane Run | Silver Cross | Orion Star
2004
Lord Du Sud | Prospect Park | Cherry Mix
2003
Coroner | Touch Of Land | Risk Seeker
2002
Khalkevi | Black Sam Bellamy | Thompson Rouge
2001
Maille Pistol | Sagacity | Balthazar

2000–1995
2000
Lord Flasheart | Crimson Quest | Hesiode
1999
Falcon Flight | State Shinto | Vanishing World
1998
Sayarshan | Sestino | Makaruka
1997
Shaka | Oscar | Alekos
1996
Arbatax | Dark Nile | Stage Pass
1995
Rifapour | Poliglote | El Tenor

The Prix Hocquart is a Group 3 flat horse race in France open to three-year-old thoroughbred colts and fillies. It is run over a distance of 2,400 metres (about 1 mile and 4 furlongs) at Chantilly.

== History ==
The event was established in 1861, and it was originally called the Prix de Longchamps. In the early part of its history its distance was 2,500 metres. Due to the Franco-Prussian War, it was not run in 1871.

The Prix de Longchamps was one of several trials for the Prix du Jockey Club collectively known as the Poules des Produits. The others (listed by their modern titles) were the Prix Daru, the Prix Lupin, the Prix Noailles and the Prix Greffulhe. The Prix de Longchamps was restricted to the produce of mares covered by stallions born and bred in France. It was funded by entries submitted before a horse's birth, in the year of conception.

The race continued with its original title until 1884. It was renamed in memory of Louis Hocquart de Turtot (1823–1884), a founder member of the board of French horse racing, in 1885.

The Prix Hocquart was shortened to 2,400 metres in 1902. It was abandoned throughout World War I, with no running from 1915 to 1919. It was cancelled once during World War II, in 1940. It was contested at Le Tremblay over 2,300 metres from 1943 to 1945.

The event was staged at Chantilly over 2,200 metres from 1997 to 2000. Its distance at Longchamp was cut to 2,200 metres in 2005.

Twenty-seven winners of the race have achieved victory in the Prix du Jockey Club. The first was Patricien in 1867, and the most recent was Bering in 1986.

The race was moved permanently to Chantilly in 2017, and pushed back in the racing calendar to be run on the same day as the Prix de Diane. It therefore functioned as a Grand Prix de Paris trial instead of a trial for the Prix du Jockey Club. In 2020 it returned to Longchamp and was run in late May on the same day as the Prix Saint-Alary.

== Records ==
Leading jockey (5 wins):

- Yves Saint-Martin – Reliance (1965), Margouillat (1973), Darshaan (1984), Mouktar (1985), Sadjiyd (1987)
- Freddy Head – Bourbon (1971), Talleyrand (1972), Val de l'Orne (1975), Montcontour (1977), Mot d'Or (1980)

Leading trainer (7 wins):

- André Fabre – Jeu de Paille (1983), Nasr El Arab (1988), Dancehall (1989), Vadlawys (1994), Hurricane Run (2005), Democrate (2008), Tableaux (2013)

Leading owner (7 wins):

- Henri Delamarre – Matamore (1865), Victorieuse (1866), Patricien (1867), Faublas (1872), Filoselle (1876), Vesuve (1877), Vin Sec (1891)

== Winners since 1979 ==
| Year | Winner | Jockey | Trainer | Owner | Time |
|---|---|---|---|---|---|
| 1979 | Le Marmot | Philippe Paquet | François Boutin | Rodolph Schafer | 2:43.20 |
| 1980 | Mot d'Or | Freddy Head | Alec Head | Jacques Wertheimer | 2:32.00 |
| 1981 | Rahotep | Jean-Luc Kessas | Bernard Sécly | Jean-Claude Weill | 2:45.20 |
| 1982 | Cadoudal | Jean-Luc Kessas | Bernard Sécly | André Boutboul | 2:43.80 |
| 1983 | Jeu de Paille | Henri Samani | André Fabre | Guy de Rothschild | 2:41.80 |
| 1984 | Darshaan | Yves Saint-Martin | Alain de Royer-Dupré | HH Aga Khan IV | 2:36.20 |
| 1985 | Mouktar | Yves Saint-Martin | Alain de Royer-Dupré | HH Aga Khan IV | 2:35.60 |
| 1986 | Bering | Gary W. Moore | Criquette Head | Ghislaine Head | 2:36.10 |
| 1987 | Sadjiyd | Yves Saint-Martin | Alain de Royer-Dupré | HH Aga Khan IV | 2:28.30 |
| 1988 | Nasr El Arab | Steve Cauthen | André Fabre | Sheikh Mohammed | 2:28.90 |
| 1989 | Dancehall | Cash Asmussen | André Fabre | Tomohiro Wada | 2:29.20 |
| 1990 | Top Waltz | Éric Legrix | Jean-Marie Béguigné | Adolf Renk | 2:31.90 |
| 1991 | Pistolet Bleu | Dominique Boeuf | Élie Lellouche | Daniel Wildenstein | 2:30.00 |
| 1992 | Adieu au Roi | Walter Swinburn | Jean Lesbordes | David Tsui | 2:37.20 |
| 1993 | Regency | Pat Eddery | Criquette Head | Khalid Abdullah | 2:34.60 |
| 1994 | Vadlawys | Thierry Jarnet | André Fabre | Jean-Luc Lagardère | 2:34.40 |
| 1995 | Rifapour | Gérald Mossé | Alain de Royer-Dupré | HH Aga Khan IV | 2:29.30 |
| 1996 | Arbatax | Cash Asmussen | Pascal Bary | Mrs François Boutin | 2:32.00 |
| 1997 | Shaka | Jean-René Dubosc | Jean-Claude Rouget | Robert Bousquet | 2:22.80 |
| 1998 | Sayarshan | Sylvain Guillot | Pascal Bary | Jean-Luc Lagardère | 2:22.10 |
| 1999 | Falcon Flight | Sylvain Guillot | Pascal Bary | Ecurie J. L. Bouchard | 2:16.20 |
| 2000 | Lord Flasheart | Gérald Mossé | Alain de Royer-Dupré | Jean-Claude Seroul | 2:23.60 |
| 2001 | Maille Pistol | Jean-René Dubosc | Jean-Claude Rouget | Michel Roussel | 2:34.40 |
| 2002 | Khalkevi | Christophe Soumillon | Alain de Royer-Dupré | Aga Khan IV | 2:32.20 |
| 2003 | Coroner | Stéphane Pasquier | Jean-Claude Rouget | Marquesa de Moratalla | 2:35.80 |
| 2004 | Lord du Sud | Éric Legrix | Jean-Claude Rouget | Béatrice Hermelin | 2:35.90 |
| 2005 | Hurricane Run | Christophe Soumillon | André Fabre | Gestüt Ammerland | 2:18.50 |
| 2006 | Numide | Ioritz Mendizabal | Jean-Claude Rouget | Ecurie I. M. Fares | 2:23.00 |
| 2007 | Anton Chekhov | Johnny Murtagh | Aidan O'Brien | Tabor / Magnier / Smith | 2:23.00 |
| 2008 | Democrate | Stéphane Pasquier | André Fabre | Skymarc / Moussac / Gill | 2:15.20 |
| 2009 | Wajir | Anthony Crastus | Élie Lellouche | Ecurie Wildenstein | 2:17.60 |
| 2010 | Silver Pond | Olivier Peslier | Carlos Laffon-Parias | Haras du Quesnay | 2:17.00 |
| 2011 | Prairie Star | Christophe Soumillon | Élie Lellouche | Ecurie Wildenstein | 2:17.27 |
| 2012 | Top Trip | Thomas Huet | François Doumen | Joerg Vasicek | 2:18.33 |
| 2013 | Tableaux | Maxime Guyon | André Fabre | Smith / Tabor | 2:17.42 |
| 2014 | Free Port Lux | Thierry Jarnet | Freddy Head | Olivier Thomas | 2:23.11 |
| 2015 | Ampere | Mickael Barzalona | André Fabre | Scea Haras de Saint Pair | 2:18.35 |
| 2016 | Mekhtaal (Note: The 2016 & 2017 runnings took place at Deauville over 10 furlongs while Longchamp was closed for redevelopment) | Gregory Benoist | Jean-Claude Rouget | Al Shaqab Racing | 2:07.03 |
| 2017 | Ice Breeze | Vincent Cheminaud | Pascal Bary | Khalid Abdulla | 2:33.09 |
| 2018 | Nocturnal Fox | Mickael Barzalona | André Fabre | Godolphin | 2:29.51 |
| 2019 | Al Hilalee | James Doyle | Charlie Appelby | Godolphin | 2:29.10 |
| 2020 | Port Guillaume (Note: The 2020 race was run at Deauville in August due to the COVID-19 pandemic in France) | Cristian Demuro | Jean-Claude Rouget | Claudio Marzocco | 2:38.23 |
| 2021 | Bubble Gift (Note: The 2021 & 2022 runnings took place at Longchamp over 11 furlongs) | Gérald Mossé | Mikel Delzangles | Zak Bloodstock | 2:22.74 |
| 2022 | L'Astronome | Christophe Soumillon | Francis-Henri Graffard | Al Asayl France | 2:20.61 |
| 2023 | First Minister | Bauyrzhan Murzabayev | Andre Fabre | Tabot/Smith/Mrs. Magnier/ Westerberg | 2:17.48 |
| 2024 | Calandagan | Stephane Pasquier | Francis-Henri Graffard | H H Aga Khan | 2:27.48 |
| 2025 | Rafale Design | Christophe Soumillon | Y Barberot | Laurent Dassault, Cormac Farrel Et Al | 2:22.74 |
| 2026 | Varandir | Mickael Barzalona | Francis-Henri Graffard | Aga Khan Studs Scea | 2:15.47 |

== Earlier winners ==
- 1861: Good By
- 1862: Allez y Rondement
- 1863: Villafranca
- 1864: Gedeon
- 1865: Matamore
- 1866: Victorieuse
- 1867: Patricien
- 1868: Le Bosphore
- 1869: Pandour
- 1870: Bigarreau
- 1871: no race
- 1872: Faublas
- 1873: Absalon
- 1874: Succes
- 1875: Saint Cyr
- 1876: Filoselle
- 1877: Vesuve
- 1878: Stathouder
- 1879: Salteador
- 1880: Versigny
- 1881: Serpolette
- 1882: Dictateur II
- 1883: Farfadet
- 1884: Silex
- 1885: Extra
- 1886: Upas
- 1887: Vanneau
- 1888: Saint Gall
- 1889: Aerolithe
- 1890: Yellow
- 1891: Vin Sec
- 1892: Fontenoy
- 1893: Ragotsky
- 1894: Polygone
- 1895: Roitelet
- 1896: Kerym
- 1897: Canvass Back
- 1898: Le Roi Soleil
- 1899: Perth
- 1900: Ivry
- 1901: Saint Armel
- 1902: Maximum
- 1903: Ex Voto
- 1904: Orange Blossom
- 1905: Brienne
- 1906: Maintenon
- 1907: Pitti
- 1908: Lieutel
- 1909: Mehari
- 1910: My Star
- 1911: Faucheur
- 1912: Zenith
- 1913: Pere Marquette
- 1914: Sardanapale
- 1915–19: no race
- 1920: Caliban
- 1921: Ksar
- 1922: Joyeux Drille
- 1923: Massine
- 1924: Vineuil
- 1925: Belfonds
- 1926: Soubadar
- 1927: Flamant
- 1928: Palais Royal
- 1929: Hotweed
- 1930: Veloucreme
- 1931: Tourbillon
- 1932: Bishop's Rock
- 1933: Le Grand Cyrus
- 1934: Maravedis
- 1935: Louqsor
- 1936: Mieuxce
- 1937: Clairvoyant
- 1938: Royal Gift
- 1939: Irifle
- 1940: no race
- 1941: Le Pacha
- 1942: Hern the Hunter
- 1943: Verso II
- 1944: Ardan
- 1945: Chanteur
- 1946: Adrar
- 1947: Timor
- 1948: My Love
- 1949: Val Drake
- 1950: L'Amiral
- 1951: Sicambre
- 1952: Auriban
- 1953: Fort de France
- 1954: Prince Rouge
- 1955: Rapace
- 1956: Floriados
- 1957: Argel
- 1958: San Roman
- 1959: Herbager
- 1960: Angers
- 1961: Moutiers
- 1962: Val de Loir
- 1963: Le Mesnil
- 1964: Free Ride
- 1965: Reliance
- 1966: Hauban
- 1967: Frontal
- 1968: Valmy
- 1969: Beaugency
- 1970: Gyr
- 1971: Bourbon
- 1972: Talleyrand *
- 1973: Margouillat
- 1974: Poil de Chameau
- 1975: Val de l'Orne
- 1976: Grandchant
- 1977: Montcontour
- 1978: Frere Basile

* The 1972 winner Talleyrand was later renamed Hakodate.

== See also ==
- List of French flat horse races
- Recurring sporting events established in 1861 – the Prix Hocquart is included under its original title, Prix de Longchamps.
