= Louis Jean, duc Decazes =

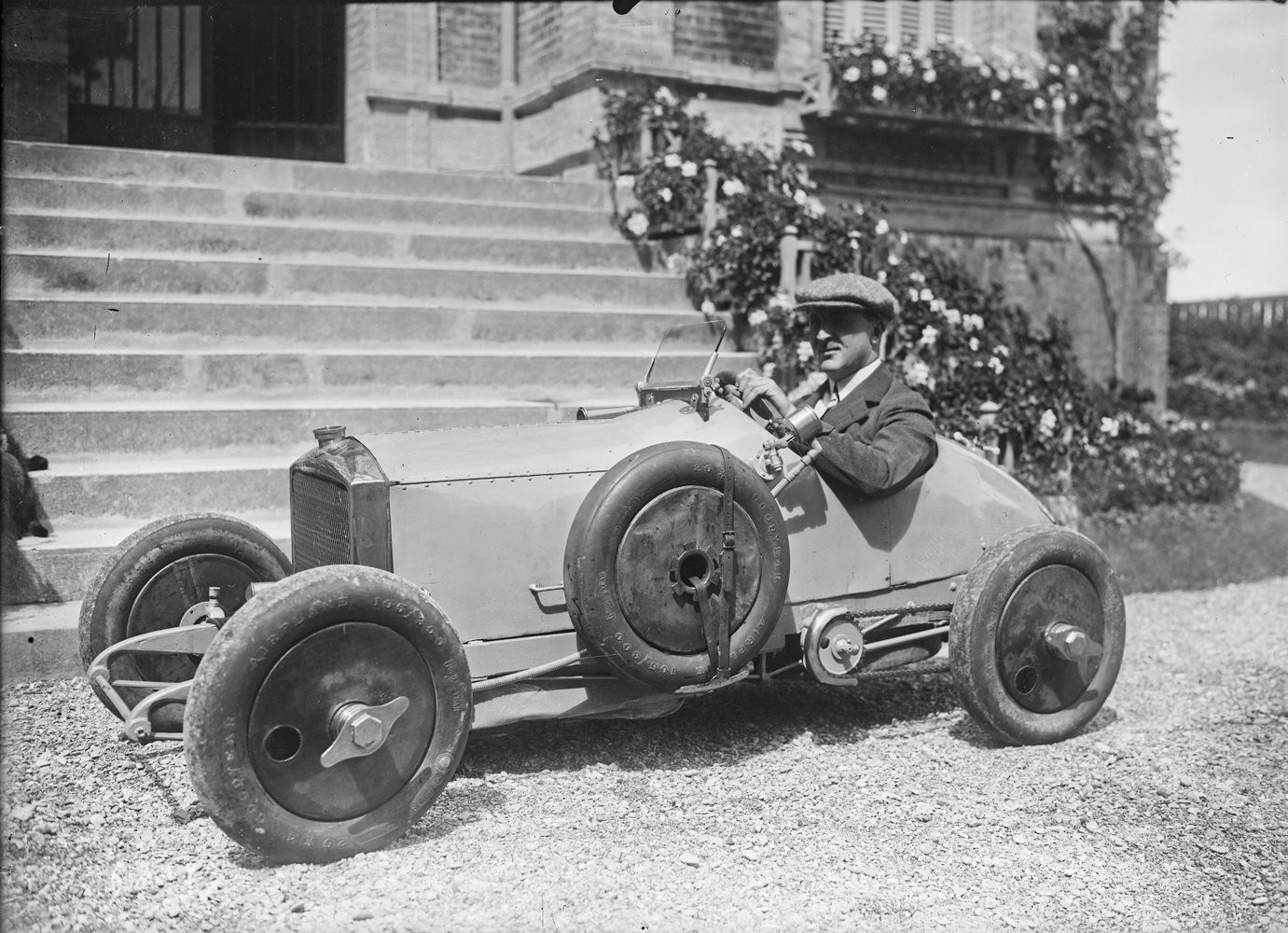
Duc Decazes in Deauville (driving a cart) - (press photography) - (Rol Agency)

Louis Jean Victor Sévère Decazes de Glücksbierg, 4th Duc Decazes and 4th Hertig af Glücksbierg (French pronunciation: [lwi dəkaz]; February 24, 1889 – June 2, 1941), was a French businessman and Thoroughbred racehorse owner and breeder.

== Biography ==
Louis Jean Decazes was born in Paris. On October 2, 1912, he married at Savigné-l'Evêque Marie Catherine Germaine Couturié (daughter of the Châtelain of Mesnil) (Paris, April 25, 1885 - Lausanne, October 23, 1968), with whom he had five children. In 1916 he acquired the Haras d'Ouilly stud farm in Pont-d'Ouilly, Calvados. He acquired more land surrounding his property and spent a great deal of money modernizing the facilities. In 1918 he purchased Prince Palatine from the South African breeder Jack Barnato Joel. In 1923, Louis Jean Decazes horse L'Yser won the Grand Steeple-Chase de Paris.

Beginning in 1921, he was a partner in some horses with François Dupré and in 1930 sold the Haras d'Ouilly property to Dupré.

Duke Decazes died on June 2, 1941, in Lausanne, Switzerland where he had lived since 1936.

His sister was the fashion icon and writer Daisy Fellowes.

== Children and grandchildren ==
- Élie Ludovic Henri-Christian Decazes de Glücksberg, 5th Duc Decazes and 5th Hertig af Glücksbierg (Chantilly, May 16, 1914 - March 17, 2011), married in Paris, November 15, 1937, Solange Rose Lucie du Temple de Rougemont (Paris, June 20, 1917- January 2, 2011), and had:
  - Edith Marie Hélène Germaine Decazes de Glücksberg (Paris, December 6, 1938), married at Bonzac civilly on June 8 and religiously on June 9, 1962, Georges Roger Jean François Comte Lannes de Montebello (Paris, September 28, 1934), and had issue
  - Marie Isabelle Decazes de Glücksberg (Bordeaux-Cauderan, July 4, 1941), married at Bonzac civilly on February 20 and religiously February 27, 1965, Jean Henri Comte de Sabran-Pontevès (Villecresnes, January 15, 1939), and had female issue
  - Séverine Marie Yveline Gabrielle Decazes de Glücksberg (Libourne, July 29, 1943), married civilly at Choisel, June 24, and religiously in Venice, July 8, 1967, Henri-François Léon Théophile Le Tonnelier Marquis de Breteuil (Boulogne-Billancourt, December 5, 1943)
  - Gabrielle Sylviane Marie-Françoise Decazes de Glücksberg (Libourne, March 24, 1945), unmarried and without issue
  - Louis Frédéric René Marie Edouard Decazes de Glücksberg, 6th Duc Decazes and 6th Hertig af Glücksbierg (Lausanne, November 14, 1946), unmarried and without issue
- Jacques Louis Élie Mortimer Decazes de Glücksberg (Paris, February 23, 1917 - Lausanne, May 24, 1998), married in Paris, June 8, 1938, Margherita Maria Helena von Heeren (Madrid, January 7, 1915 - 1994), and had:
  - Marie-Solange Nadine Germaine Isabelle Decazes de Glücksberg (Paris, April 18, 1939), married firstly at Moulleau, July 7, 1960, and divorced in Paris, March 3, 1971, Bernard Derode (Neuilly, April 19, 1937), and secondly at Le Chesnay, February 23, 1974, Olivier Jacques Marie Nodé-Langlois (Marseille, March 20, 1943)
  - Nadine Marie Catalina Decazes de Glücksberg (Neuilly, September 14, 1941), married in Paris, November 5, 1970, Henri Alain Charles Coeur Marie Comte Rouillé d'Orfeuil (Boulogne-Billancourt, June 28, 1946)
  - Jacques-Marie Louis Pedro Decazes de Glücksberg (Savigné-l'Evêque, December 19, 1944), married at Remaucourt, June 20, 1975, Bernadette Marie Constant (Remaucourt, June 23, 1947)
  - Jean-Marie Élie Decazes de Glücksberg (Vevey, March 6, 1949), married April 19, 1998, Corinne Missipo-Bebey (Douala, Cameroun, July 14, 1958)
    - Louis-Jean Decazes de Glücksberg (Paris, January 26, 2001)
- Marie Catherine Isabelle Séverine Germaine Marguerite Marie Decazes de Glücksberg (Savigné-l-Evêque, April 26, 1918 - Geneva, November 28, 1968), married in New York City, New York, June 3, 1948, Jehan Ludovic James Achille de Nouë (Étretat, June 17, 1907 - Geneva, April 7, 1999)
- Marie Yveline Decazes de Glücksberg (Paris, June 23, 1920 - Vevey, September 8, 1984), married firstly civilly at Lausanne, April 24 and religiously at Freiburg, April 27, 1943, and divorced at Lausanne, August 19, 1949) Michel Joseph de Geofroy (Paris, February 28, 1913 - February 4, 1989), and secondly in Paris, July 27, 1956, and divorced at Cossonay, August 29, 1966) Henri Joseph David Mojonnet (Montreux-le-Chatelard, September 10, 1917)
- Édouard Edmond Decazes de Glücksberg (Paris, May 22, 1921), married in Richmond, Virginia, November 4, 1950, Caroline Triplett Scott (Richmond, Virginia, April 22, 1938), and had:
  - Marie-Caroline Germaine Decazes de Glücksberg (Lausanne, October 21, 1951), married in 1985 Bruno van Herpen
  - Marguerite Marie Egédie Decazes de Glücksberg (Lausanne, October 21, 1955), married in Lausanne, October 8, 1988, Christophe Slaboszewicz (Lausanne, July 20, 1958)
  - Frédéric Charles Louis Patrick Decazes de Glücksberg (Lausanne, July 20, 1958 - Tours, January 29, 2018), married in 1990 Catherine Chou
  - Lucie Henriette Philippine Decazes de Glücksberg (Lausanne, February 17, 1961), unmarried and without issue
  - Diane Douce Élisabeth Decazes de Glücksberg (Lausanne, February 3, 1963 - Lausanne, September, 1988), unmarried and without issue

French nobility
Preceded by Jean-Élie-Octave-Louis-Sévère-Amanien	Duke of Decazes; 1886–1912	Succeeded by Élie Ludovic Henri Christian
