= Tantieme =

French-bred Thoroughbred racehorse (1947–1966)

Tantième
- Sire: Deux Pour Cent
- Grandsire: Deiri
- Dam: Terka
- Damsire: Indus
- Sex: Stallion
- Foaled: 1947
- Country: France
- Colour: Bay
- Breeder: Haras d'Ouilly
- Owner: François Dupré. Racing silks: Grey, pink cap.
- Trainer: François Mathet
- Record: 15: 12–1–1
- Earnings: £81,339

Major wins
- Grand Critérium (1949); Prix de la Forêt (1949); Poule d'Essai des Poulains (1950); Prix Lupin (1950); Prix de l'Arc de Triomphe (1950 & 1951); Prix Ganay (1951); Coronation Cup (1951); Timeform rating: 136

Awards
- Leading sire in France (1962 & 1965)

Honours
- French Horse Racing Hall of Fame
- Last updated on 30 September 2025

Tantième (1947–1966) was a French Thoroughbred horse racing colt and prominent sire who won the Prix de l'Arc de Triomphe in 1950 and 1951. He also won several other important Group races, including the Grand Critérium in 1949 and the Poule d'Essai des Poulains and the Prix Lupin in 1950. As a four-year-old in 1951 Tantième won the Prix Ganay and the Coronation Cup. The French word tantième means a form of profit sharing.

== Stud career ==
After winning twelve of his fifteen races, Tantième was retired to stand at stud at François Dupré's Haras d'Ouilly where he became the Champion French Sire of 1962 and 1965. Among the best horses Tantième sired are:

- Tanerko (b. 1953) – In France won Grand Prix de Saint-Cloud, Prix Juigné, Prix Noailles, Prix Lupin, Prix du Prince d'Orange, Prix Ganay, Prix d'Harcourt Sire of Relko.
- Reliance (b. 1962) – In France won the 1965 Prix du Jockey Club, Grand Prix de Paris, Prix Royal-Oak.
- Match II (b. 1958) – In France won the 1961 Prix Royal-Oak, 1962 Grand Prix de Saint-Cloud. In England: 1962 King George VI and Queen Elizabeth Stakes and in the United States, the 1962 Washington, D.C. International.
- La Sega (b. 1959) – In France won the Prix de Diane, Poule d'Essai des Pouliches, Prix Saint-Alary, Prix d'Ispahan, Prix de la Grotte.
