= Critérium de Maisons-Laffitte =

Flat horse race in France

- Class: Group 2
- Location: Chantilly; France
- Inaugurated: 1891
- Race type: Flat / Thoroughbred
- Website: france-galop.com

Race information
- Distance: 1,200 metres (6f)
- Surface: Turf
- Track: Straight
- Qualification: Two-year-olds
- Weight: 57 kg Allowances; 1½ kg for fillies
- Purse: €190,000 (2021); 1st: €108,300

Critérium de Maisons-Laffitte
2024
| Sky Majesty | Daylight | Une Pointure |

Previous years
2023
Classic Flower | Dawn Charger | Seven Questions
2022
Charyn | Eddie's Boy | Ocean Vision
2021
Malavath | Have A Good Day | Desert Dreamer

2020-2011
2020
Plainchant | Go Athletico | Kalahara
2019
Shadn | Devil | Sir Boris
2018
Hello Youmzain | Queen Of Bermuda | Graignes
2017
Fighting Irish | Nebo | French Pegasus
2016
Sans Equivoque | Boos | Nations Alexander
2015
Donjuan Triumphant | Dressed In Fur | Smash Williams
2014
Mattmu | Queen Bee | Goken
2013
Kiram | This Time | Passing Burg
2012
Penny's Picnic | Viztoria | Boomshackerlacker
2011
Restiadargent | Vaniloquio | Dont Teutch

2010-2001
2010
Blu Constellation | Wizz Kid | Katla
2009
Our Jonathan | Ascot Glory | Dolled Up
2008
Smooth Operator | Dalghar | Lui Rei
2007
Pomellato | Norman Invader | Equiano
2006
Captain Marvelous | Baby Strange | Iron Lips
2005
Balthazaar's Gift | Gwenseb | Curtail
2004
Centifolia | Salut Thomas | Campo Bueno
2003
Whipper | Chineur | Black Escort
2002
Zinziberine | Fiepes Shuffle | Bella Tusa
2001
Captain Rio | War Zone | Perrexa

2000-1991
2000
Amiwain | Stunning | Greengroom
1999
Touch Of The Blues | Blu Air Force | Compton Bolter
1998
Moiava | Restless War | Zirconi
1997
Roi Gironde | Diableneyev | Desert Drama
1996
Deadly Dudley | Sheer Reason | Hurricane State
1995
Titus Livius | Starmaniac | Seattle Special
1994
Bishop Of Cashel | Bashaayeash | Chequer
1993
Signe Divin | Carmot | Wessam Prince
1992
Kadounor | Wixon | Chancetobewild
1991
Cardoun | Tertian | Absurde

1990-1988
1990
Ganges | Crack Regiment | Divine Danse
1989
Septieme Ciel | Sharp Sass | Robin Des Bois
1988
Corviglia | Mister Sicy | Philippi

The Critérium de Maisons-Laffitte is a Group 2 flat horse race in France open to two-year-old thoroughbreds. It is run at Chantilly over a distance of 1,200 metres (about 6 furlongs), and it is scheduled to take place each year in October.

== History ==
The event was established in 1891 at Maisons-Laffitte, and it was originally held in September. It served as a trial for the Grand Critérium in mid-October. It was initially contested over 1,400 metres, and was shortened to 1,200 metres in 1897.

The Critérium de Maisons-Laffitte was abandoned throughout World War I, with no running from 1914 to 1919. It was extended to 1,500 metres in 1922.

The race was cancelled twice during World War II, in 1939 and 1940. It was staged at Longchamp in 1941 and 1942, and at Le Tremblay over 1,400 metres in 1944. It took place at Longchamp again in 1945, and was abandoned in 1948. Its regular distance was cut to 1,400 metres in 1952.

The present system of race grading was introduced in 1971, and the Critérium de Maisons-Laffitte was classed at Group 2 level. It was moved to late October or early November in 1981.

The event was contested at Évry over 1,300 metres in 1995 and 1996. During this period it was called the Critérium des Deux Ans. It reverted to 1,400 metres in 1997, and started its present spell over 1,200 metres in 2001. The race was moved to mid-October in 2015 as part of a series of changes to autumn races for two-year-olds. Maisons-Laffitte closed at the end of the 2019 season and the race has been run at Chantilly since 2020.

== Records ==
Leading jockey (5 wins):

- Christophe Soumillon – Zinziberine (2002), Whipper (2003), Captain Marvelous (2006), Kiram (2013), Sky Majesty (2024)

Leading trainer (9 wins):

- François Boutin – Speedy Dakota (1974), Crowned Music (1978), Viteric (1979), Cresta Rider (1980), Zino (1981), L'Emigrant (1982), Procida (1983), Corviglia (1988), Ganges (1990)

Leading owner (9 wins):

- Marcel Boussac – Ramus (1921), Nosca (1941), Sandjar (1946), Djeddah (1947), Pharad (1951), Albanilla (1953), Janiari (1955), Floriana (1958), Perello (1976)

== Winners since 1978 ==
| Year | Winner | Jockey | Trainer | Owner | Time |
|---|---|---|---|---|---|
| 1978 | Crowned Music | Philippe Paquet | François Boutin | Walter Haefner | 1:25.30 |
| 1979 | Viteric | Philippe Paquet | François Boutin | Walter Haefner |
| 1980 | Cresta Rider | Philippe Paquet | François Boutin | Stavros Niarchos |
| 1981 | Zino | Philippe Paquet | François Boutin | Gerry Oldham |
| 1982 | L'Emigrant | Cash Asmussen | François Boutin | Stavros Niarchos | 1:30.50 |
| 1983 | Procida | Cash Asmussen | François Boutin | Stavros Niarchos | 1:25.20 |
| 1984 | Rapide Pied | Freddy Head | Criquette Head | Maktoum Al Maktoum | 1:29.20 |
| 1985 | Lead on Time | Alain Badel | Olivier Douieb | Maktoum Al Maktoum | 1:25.00 |
| 1986 | Grecian Urn | Alain Lequeux | David Smaga | Sir Michael Sobell |
| 1987 | Bitooh | Gary W. Moore | Criquette Head | Maktoum Al Maktoum | 1:31.90 |
| 1988 | Corviglia | Eric Saint-Martin | François Boutin | Jerome Brody | 1:30.70 |
| 1989 | Septieme Ciel | Guy Guignard | Criquette Head | Johnny Jones | 1:24.30 |
| 1990 | Ganges | Éric Legrix | François Boutin | Allen Paulson | 1:25.90 |
| 1991 | Cardoun | Alain Lequeux | Élie Lellouche | Edgard Zorbibe | 1:29.70 |
| 1992 | Kadounor | Olivier Doleuze | Jean Laumain | Henri Rabatel | 1:35.40 |
| 1993 | Signe Divin | Thierry Jarnet | André Fabre | Paul de Moussac | 1:28.50 |
| 1994 | Bishop of Cashel | David Harrison | James Fanshawe | Moncrisp Ltd | 1:32.20 |
| 1995 | Titus Livius (Note: The 1995 and 1996 runnings took place at Évry) | Cash Asmussen | Jonathan Pease | Stavros Niarchos | 1:19.07 |
| 1996 | Deadly Dudley | Olivier Peslier | Richard Hannon Sr. | Lucayan Stud | 1:20.11 |
| 1997 | Roi Gironde | Olivier Peslier | Criquette Head | Peter Savill | 1:27.50 |
| 1998 | Moiava | Olivier Doleuze | Criquette Head | Wertheimer et Frère | 1:31.90 |
| 1999 | Touch of the Blues | Dominique Boeuf | Carlos Laffon-Parias | Maktoum Al Maktoum | 1:29.80 |
| 2000 | Amiwain | Olivier Peslier | André Fabre | Jean-Luc Lagardère | 1:29.40 |
| 2001 | Captain Rio | Thierry Jarnet | Richard Whitaker | David Samuel | 1:14.30 |
| 2002 | Zinziberine | Christophe Soumillon | André Fabre | Elisabeth Fabre | 1:12.70 |
| 2003 | Whipper | Christophe Soumillon | Robert Collet | Richard Strauss | 1:14.70 |
| 2004 | Centifolia | Ioritz Mendizabal | Robert Collet | Steeve Berland | 1:12.00 |
| 2005 | Balthazaar's Gift | Jamie Spencer | Kevin Ryan | Ryder Racing Ltd | 1:10.10 |
| 2006 | Captain Marvelous | Christophe Soumillon | Barry Hills | Ronald Arculli | 1:11.60 |
| 2007 | Pomellato | Andrasch Starke | Peter Schiergen | Gestüt Ittlingen | 1:13.60 |
| 2008 | Smooth Operator | Andreas Helfenbein | Mario Hofer | Stall Jenny | 1:15.30 |
| 2009 | Our Jonathan | Jamie Spencer | Kevin Ryan | Marwan Koukash | 1:19.70 |
| 2010 | Blu Constellation | Mirco Demuro | Vittorio Caruso | Scuderia Incolinx | 1:14.40 |
| 2011 | Restiadargent | Maxime Guyon | Henri-Alex Pantall | Guy Pariente | 1:14.40 |
| 2012 | Penny's Picnic | Antoine Hamelin | Didier Guillemin | Saint-Seine / Delegue | 1:14.40 |
| 2013 | Kiram | Christophe Soumillon | Jean-Claude Rouget | HH Aga Khan | 1:16.30 |
| 2014 | Mattmu | David Allan | Tim Easterby | James Bowers | 1:13.35 |
| 2015 | Donjuan Triumphant | Alexis Badel | Richard Fahey | Middleham Park Racing | 1:13.10 |
| 2016 | Sans Equivoque | Thierry Jarnet | Didier Guillemin | Sun Bloodstock Sarl | 1:12.78 |
| 2017 | Fighting Irish | Cristian Demuro | Harry Dunlop | Daniel Macauliffe & Anoj Don | 1:11.59 |
| 2018 | Hello Youmzain | Kevin Stott | Kevin Ryan | Jaber Abdullah | 1:10.60 |
| 2019 | Shadn | Pierre-Charles Boudot | Andrew Balding | Katsumi Yoshida | 1:12.23 |
| 2020 | Plainchant | Valentin Seguy | Maurizio Guarnieri | Alain Jathiere | 1:16.15 |
| 2021 | Malavath | Olivier Peslier | Francis-Henri Graffard | Everest Racing, David Redvers & Mrs Barbara M Keller | 1:12.11 |
| 2022 | Charyn | Mickael Barzalona | Roger Varian | Nurlan Bizakov | 1:10.58 |
| 2023 | Classic Flower | Mickael Barzalona | Patrice Cottier | Gousserie Racing & Jean-Etienne Dubois | 1:10.03 |
| 2024 | Sky Majesty | Christophe Soumillon | William Haggas | Tony Bloom & Ian McAleavy | 1:14.15 |
| 2025 | Samangan | Mickael Barzalona | Francis-Henri Graffard | Aga Khan Studs SCEA | 1:10.39 |
| 2026 | Al Hamaad | Oisin Murphy | André & Lavinia Fabre | Prince A A Faisal | 1:10.55 |

== Earlier winners ==
- 1891: Idalie
- 1892: Commandeur
- 1893: L'Herault
- 1894: Cherbourg
- 1895: Champignol
- 1896: Fils de Roi
- 1897: Artisan
- 1898: Holocauste
- 1899: Ramadan
- 1900: Butor
- 1901: Le Mandinet
- 1902: Hebron
- 1903: French Fox
- 1904: Val d'Or
- 1905: Prestige
- 1906: Peroraison
- 1907: Northeast
- 1908: Azalee
- 1909: Nuage
- 1910: Nectarine
- 1911: Montrose
- 1912: Coupesarte
- 1913: Listman
- 1914–19: no race
- 1920: Cortland
- 1921: Ramus
- 1922: Épinard
- 1923: Carnation
- 1924: Melisande
- 1925: Apelle
- 1926: Fenimore Cooper ^{1}
- 1927: Mourad
- 1928: Florio
- 1929: Le Val d'Enfer
- 1930: Indus
- 1931: Present
- 1932: Le Cacique
- 1933: Boucan
- 1934: Clain
- 1935: Alejo
- 1936: May Wong
- 1937: Blue Star
- 1938: Birikil
- 1939–40: no race
- 1941: Nosca
- 1942: Pensbury
- 1943: Turquoise
- 1944:
- 1945: Tourmente
- 1946: Sandjar
- 1947: Djeddah
- 1948: no race
- 1949: Fort Napoleon
- 1950: Le Tyrol
- 1951: Pharad
- 1952: Fort de France
- 1953: Albanilla
- 1954: Soleil Royal
- 1955: Janiari
- 1956: Achaz
- 1957: Bella Paola
- 1958: Floriana
- 1959: Djebel Traffic
- 1960: Star
- 1961: Lebon M L
- 1962: Neptune's Doll
- 1963: Soleil d'Or
- 1964: Sea Bird
- 1965: Hauban
- 1966: Gazala
- 1967: Pola Bella
- 1968: Rimesault
- 1969: Faraway Son
- 1970: Round Top
- 1971: Steel Pulse
- 1972: Rose Laurel
- 1973: Wittgenstein
- 1974: Speedy Dakota
- 1975: Earth Spirit
- 1976: Perello
- 1977: Vallee des Fleurs ^{2}

^{1} Jopp finished first in 1926, but was relegated to second place following a stewards' inquiry.
^{2} Cosmopolitan was first in 1977, but he was placed second after a stewards' inquiry.

== See also ==
- List of French flat horse races
