= Diatome =

British-bred Thoroughbred racehorse

- Sire: Sicambre
- Grandsire: Prince Bio
- Dam: Dictaway
- Damsire: Honeway
- Sex: Stallion
- Foaled: 13 June 1962
- Country: Great Britain
- Colour: Dark Bay
- Breeder: Baron Guy de Rothschild
- Owner: Baron Guy de Rothschild
- Trainer: Geoffroy Watson
- Record: 12: 6-5-1
- Earnings: F 1,643,013 + US$90,000

Major wins
- Prix Noailles (1965); Prix du Prince d'Orange (1965); Washington, D.C. International (1965); Prix Ganay (1966); Prix Boiard (1966)

Honours
- Prix Diatome at Hippodrome de Saint-Cloud
- Last updated on 7 October 2006

Diatome (13 June 1962 – 8 October 1985) was a British-bred Thoroughbred racehorse.

== Background ==
Diatome was owned and bred by the French banker, Baron Guy de Rothschild and was a descendant of Prince Palatine,

== Racing career ==
Diatome won important races in France but had the bad luck of being foaled the same year as superstars Sea-Bird and Reliance. He finished second to Reliance in the Prix du Jockey Club and the Grand Prix de Paris. In the Prix de l'Arc de Triomphe, Diatome finished third behind Reliance and winner Sea Bird. However, he earned a prestigious victory in the United States in the 1965 Washington, D.C. International at the Laurel Park Racecourse in Laurel, Maryland.

== Stud record ==
Diatome was retired to stud in 1967 at his owner's Haras de Meautry and in 1975 was sent to a breeding farm in Japan. He died on 8 October 1985.
