= Prince Palatine (disambiguation) =

Prince Palatine may refer to:

- Prince Rupert of the Rhine
- No. 60052 Prince Palatine, steam engine
- Prince Palatine, race horse
