= Bella Paola =

French-bred Thoroughbred racehorse

- Sire: Ticino
- Grandsire: Athanasius
- Dam: Rhea II
- Damsire: Gundomar
- Sex: Mare
- Foaled: 1955
- Country: France
- Colour: Brown
- Breeder: François Dupré
- Owner: François Dupré
- Trainer: François Mathet
- Record: 10: 7-1-13

Major wins
- Critérium de Maisons-Laffitte (1957); Grand Critérium (1957); Prix Imprudence (1958); 1,000 Guineas (1958); Epsom Oaks (1958); Prix Vermeille (1958); Champion Stakes (1958)

Awards
- Timeform rating 131; Timeform top-rated three-year-old filly (1958)

Bella Paola (foaled 1955) was a French Thoroughbred racehorse who won several major races in France and Britain including the classic 1,000 Guineas and Epsom Oaks in 1958.

== Background ==
Bella Paola was a big, powerful brown filly, standing 16.3 hands high, bred by her owner François Dupré. Although she was foaled in France her ancestry was predominantly German: she was sired by Ticino, who won the Deutsches Derby and three renewals of the Grosser Preis von Berlin. She was sent into training with François Mathet at Chantilly

== Racing career ==
In 1957, Bella Paola finished third in the Prix Yacowlef on her debut and then won the Prix Georges de Kerhallet at Clairefontaine, the Critérium de Maisons-Laffitte and the Grand Critérium. She was rated the second best two-year-old in France – only her stablemate Texana was rated superior to her. Dupré and Mathet were always keen to attack the top prizes in England and Bella Paola won both the 1,000 Guineas and The Oaks. In the former she was ridden by Serge Boullenger, but because of military service he was not allowed to ride at Epsom and Max Garcia replaced him. Also runner-up in the Prix du Jockey Club, Bella Paola ran disappointingly in the Prix de l'Arc de Triomphe, but ended her career with victory in the Champion Stakes.

== Stud record ==
At stud her best foal was Pola Bella, who won the Poule d'Essai des Pouliches and was second in the Prix de Diane before breeding several winners, including Val Divine.

== Pedigree ==
Pedigree of Bella Paola
Sire Ticino 1939	Athanasius 1931	Ferro	Landgraf
Sire Ticino 1939	Athanasius 1931	Ferro	Frauenlob
Sire Ticino 1939	Athanasius 1931	Athanasie	Laland
Sire Ticino 1939	Athanasius 1931	Athanasie	Athene
Sire Ticino 1939	Terra 1929	Aditi	Dark Ronald
Sire Ticino 1939	Terra 1929	Aditi	Aversion
Sire Ticino 1939	Terra 1929	Teufelsrose	Robert Le Diable
Sire Ticino 1939	Terra 1929	Teufelsrose	Rosanna
Dam Rhea 1950	Gundomar 1942	Alchimist	Herold
Dam Rhea 1950	Gundomar 1942	Alchimist	Aversion
Dam Rhea 1950	Gundomar 1942	Grossularia	Aurelius
Dam Rhea 1950	Gundomar 1942	Grossularia	Grolle Nicht
Dam Rhea 1950	Regina 1867	Indus	Alcantara
Dam Rhea 1950	Regina 1867	Indus	Himalaya
Dam Rhea 1950	Regina 1867	Reine Douilly	Pharos
Dam Rhea 1950	Regina 1867	Reine Douilly	Hesione
