= Match II =

French-bred Thoroughbred racehorse

Match
- Sire: Tantieme
- Grandsire: Deux Pour Cent
- Dam: Relance
- Damsire: Relic
- Sex: Stallion
- Foaled: 1958
- Country: France
- Colour: Dark Bay
- Breeder: François Dupré
- Owner: Haras d'Ouilly
- Trainer: François Mathet
- Record: 14: 7-3-0
- Earnings: 1,746,836 FF

Major wins
- Prix Noailles (1961); Prix Royal-Oak (1961); K. George VI & Q. Elizabeth Stakes (1962); Grand Prix de Saint-Cloud (1962); Prix Boiard (1962); Washington, D.C. International (1962)

Honours
- Champion Older Horse – France (1962); Champion Older Horse – England (1962); Horse of the Year – England (1962); Timeform rating: 135
- Last updated on 19 July 2009

Match (also known as Match II and Match III) (1958–1965) was a French Thoroughbred racehorse who won major races in England, France and the United States and who was voted British Horse of the Year. Like many French-bred horses, he carried the numerical suffix "II" when racing in Britain. Because another horse with the name Match was born registered in the United States that same year, he is sometimes recorded as "Match III."

Match was bred by French hotelier François Dupré at his Haras d'Ouilly in Pont-d'Ouilly, France. The son of the champion Tantieme, he won important races in France at age two then at age three won in France and England before capping off an outstanding 1962 season with a win in the prestigious Washington, D.C. International at the Laurel Park racecourse in Laurel, Maryland. Ridden by Yves Saint-Martin, Match earned the "Best in the World" title, defeating the best turf horses from Europe, Russia, as well as the American entries, Carry Back, Beau Purple, and the great Kelso.

Match retired to stand at stud in England but died on 26 September 1965 after only three seasons, at age seven. Among his limited offspring was the colt World Cup (b. 1965) who won the 1968 Queen Elizabeth II Stakes. A son, Ovaltine, was exported to Australia where he stood at stud.
