= Val d'Or (horse) =

French-bred Thoroughbred racehorse

- Sire: Flying Fox
- Grandsire: Orme
- Dam: Wandora
- Damsire: Bruce
- Sex: Stallion
- Foaled: 1902
- Country: France
- Colour: Bay
- Owner: Edmond Blanc
- Trainer: Robert Denman
- Record: 7: 6-0-0

Major wins
- Prix de Deux Ans (1904); Critérium de Maisons-Laffitte (1904); Prix La Rochette (1904); Grand Criterium (1904); Poule d'Essai des Poulains (1905); Eclipse Stakes (1905)
- Last updated on 18 December 2012

Val d'Or (foaled 1902) was a French Thoroughbred racehorse who was only defeated 16 times in his career. His wins included the Prix de Deux Ans, Grand Criterium, Poule d'Essai des Poulains and Eclipse Stakes. During his racing career he was owned by Edmond Blanc and trained by Robert Denman. After retiring from racing he became a sire in Argentina.

== Background ==
Val d'Or was a bay colt foaled in 1902. He was sired by British Triple Crown winner Flying Fox. Flying Fox was also a successful stallion in France, with his progeny also including Prix du Jockey Club winner Ajax, Poule d'Essai des Poulains and Prix du Jockey Club winner Dagor, Prix de la Forêt winner Adam and Poule d'Essai des Poulains winner Gouvernant. Val d'Or's dam, Wandora, was a daughter of Bruce.

== Racing career ==
Val d'Or was unbeaten in four starts as a two-year-old. His wins came in the Prix de Deux Ans at Deauville, the Critérium de Maisons-Laffitte at Maisons-Laffitte, the Prix La Rochette at Longchamp and the Grand Criterium, also at Longchamp.

Returning as a three-year-old he won the Poule d'Essai des Poulains at Longchamp. In the Grand Prix de Paris he finished fourth behind winner Finasseur. It was widely believed than he was not at his best for the Grand Prix de Paris, due to him suffering from an illness that affected many horses in the stable. He then travelled over to England for the Eclipse Stakes at Sandown Park. The favourite for the race was Epsom Derby winner Cicero at 8/13. Val d'Or was second favourite at 3/1, with Llangibby at 9/1. The three outsiders of the six-strong field were Polymelus, Henry the First and Challenger. Polymelus led the field away, being followed by Cicero and Val d'Or. Cicero took the lead as they turned into the finishing straight and was closely followed by Polymelus and Val d'Or. As they neared the finish Polymelus faded away and Val d'Or challenged Cicero for the lead, with Llangibby back in third place. Val d'Or and Cicero raced side by side until the finish, where Val d'Or got the better of Cicero by half a length. Third placed Llangibby was a further three quarters of a length behind, with Polymelus finishing in fourth. Val d'Or had been the strong favourite for the St. Leger Stakes with just a few days to go to the race. However, he was held up for three days in Boulogne due to rough seas and Blanc decided to withdraw him from the race.

== Stud career ==
It had been intended for Val d'Or to stay in training as a four-year-old, but Edmond Blanc received an offer of £30,000 for him so stand at stud in Argentina, which he accepted. He met with some success as a sire there, with his progeny including Gran Premio Carlos Pellegrini winner Ocurrencia.

== Pedigree ==
Pedigree of Val d'Or, bay stallion, 1902
Sire Flying Fox (GB) b. 1896	Orme b. 1889	Ormonde b. 1883	Bend Or
Sire Flying Fox (GB) b. 1896	Orme b. 1889	Ormonde b. 1883	Lily Agnes
Sire Flying Fox (GB) b. 1896	Orme b. 1889	Angelica b. 1873	Galopin*
Sire Flying Fox (GB) b. 1896	Orme b. 1889	Angelica b. 1873	St. Angela
Sire Flying Fox (GB) b. 1896	Vampire (GB) br. 1889	Galopin* b. 1872	Vedette
Sire Flying Fox (GB) b. 1896	Vampire (GB) br. 1889	Galopin* b. 1872	Flying Duchess
Sire Flying Fox (GB) b. 1896	Vampire (GB) br. 1889	Irony ch. 1881	Rosebery
Sire Flying Fox (GB) b. 1896	Vampire (GB) br. 1889	Irony ch. 1881	Sarcasm
Dam Wandora (FR) ch. 1887	Bruce (GB) b. 1879	See Saw b. 1865	Buccaneer
Dam Wandora (FR) ch. 1887	Bruce (GB) b. 1879	See Saw b. 1865	Margery Daw
Dam Wandora (FR) ch. 1887	Bruce (GB) b. 1879	Carine b. 1866	Stockwell
Dam Wandora (FR) ch. 1887	Bruce (GB) b. 1879	Carine b. 1866	Mayonaise
Dam Wandora (FR) ch. 1887	Windfall (GB) ch. 1875	Favonius ch. 1868	Parmesan
Dam Wandora (FR) ch. 1887	Windfall (GB) ch. 1875	Favonius ch. 1868	Zephyr
Dam Wandora (FR) ch. 1887	Windfall (GB) ch. 1875	Christmas Fare br. 1864	Plum Pudding
Dam Wandora (FR) ch. 1887	Windfall (GB) ch. 1875	Christmas Fare br. 1864	Linda

Note: b. = Bay, br. = Brown, ch. = Chestnut

* Val d'Or was inbred 3 × 4 to Galopin. This means that the stallion appears once in the third generation and once in the fourth generation of his pedigree.

== See also ==
- List of leading Thoroughbred racehorses
