= Poule d'Essai des Poulains =

Flat horse race in France

Poule d'Essai des Poulains (French 2000 Guineas)
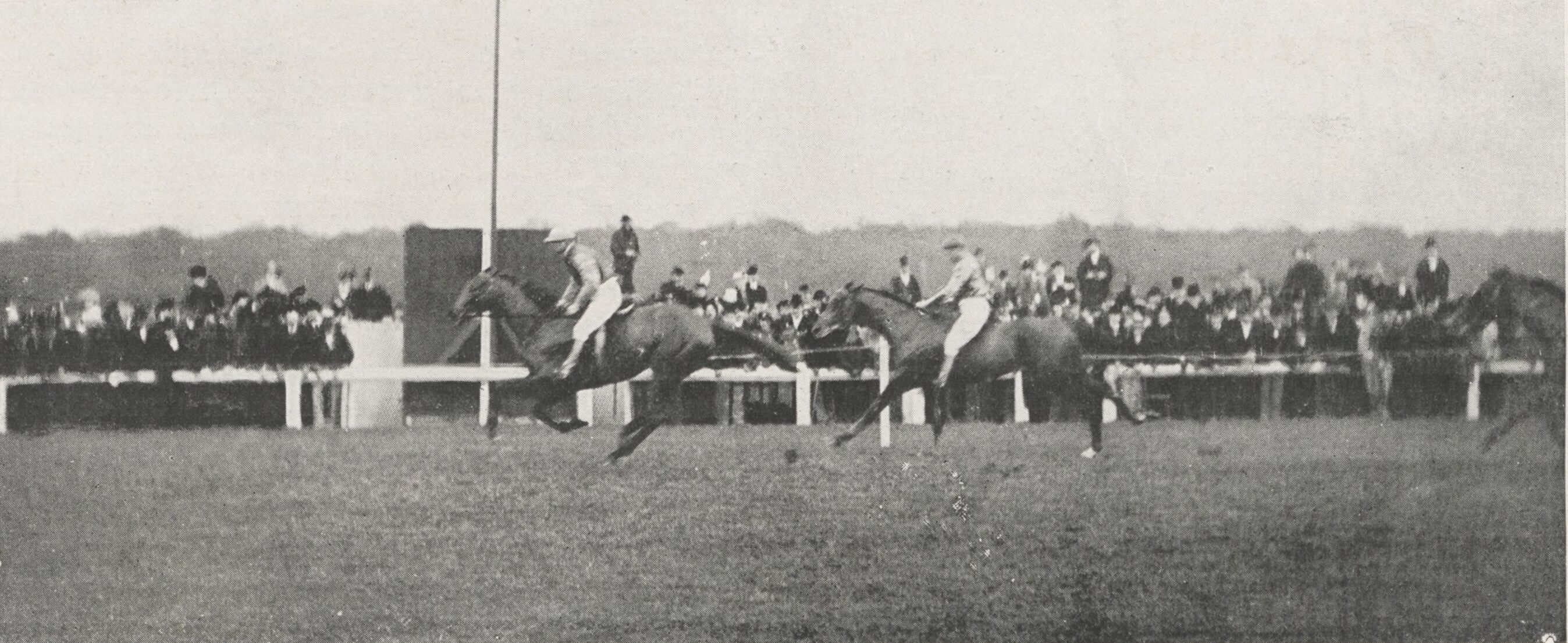
- 1899 winner Perth
- Class: Group 1
- Location: Longchamp Racecourse; Paris, France
- Inaugurated: 1883
- Race type: Flat / Thoroughbred
- Website: france-galop.com

Race information
- Distance: 1,600 metres (1 mile)
- Surface: Turf
- Track: Right-handed
- Qualification: Three-year-old colts
- Weight: 58 kg
- Purse: €600,000 (2022); 1st: €342,840

Poule d'Essai des Poulains
2026
Rayif	Komorebi	Hankelow

Previous years
2025
Henri Matisse	Jonquil	Camille Pissarro
2024
Metropolitan	Dancing Gemini	Alcantor
2022
Modern Games	Texas	Tribalist
2021
St Mark's Basilica	Colosseo	Breizh Eagle

2020-2011
2020
Victor Ludorum	The Summit	Alson
2019
Persian King	Shaman	San Donato
2018
Olmedo	Hey Gaman	Dice Roll
2017
Brametot	Le Brivido	Rivet
2016
The Gurkha	First Selection	Dicton
2015
Make Believe	New Bay	Mr Owen
2014
Karakontie	Prestige Vendome	Pornichet
2013
Style Vendome	Dastarhon	Intello
2012
Lucayan	Veneto	Furner's Green
2011
Tin Horse	Havane Smoker	Venomous

2010-2001
2010
Lope De Vega	Dick Turpin	Shamalgan
2009
Silver Frost	Le Havre	Westphalia
2008
Falco	Rio de La Plata	River Proud
2007
Astronomer Royal	Creachadoir	Honoured Guest
2006
Aussie Rules	Marcus Andronicus	Stormy River
2005
Shamardal	Indesatchel	Gharir
2004
American Post	Diamond Green	Byron
2003
Clodovil	Catcher In The Rye	Krataios
2002
Landseer	Medecis	Bowman
2001
Vahorimix	Clearing	Denon

2000-1991
2000
Bachir	Berine's Son	Valentino
1999
Sendawar	Dansili	Kingsalsa
1998
Victory Note	Muhtathir	Desert Prince
1997
Daylami	Loup Sauvage	Visionary
1996
Ashkalani	Spinning World	Tagula
1995
Vettori	Atticus	Petit Poucet
1994
Green Tune	Turtle Island	Psychobabble
1993
Kingmambo	Bin Ajwaad	Hudo
1992
Shanghai	Rainbow Corner	Lion Cavern
1991
Hector Protector	Acteur Francais	Sapieha

1990-1982
1990
Linamix	Zoman	Funambule
1989
Kendor	Goldneyev	Ocean Falls
1988
Blushing John	French Stress	Tay Wharf
1987
Soviet Star	Noble Minstrel	Glory Forever
1986
Fast Topaze	Highest Honor	Art Francais
1985
No Pass No Sale	Candy Stripes	Synefos
1984
Siberian Express	Green Paradise	Mendez
1983
L'Emigrant	Crystal Glitters	Margouzed
1982
Melyno	Tampero	Day Is Done

The Poule d'Essai des Poulains is a Group 1 flat horse race in France open to three-year-old thoroughbred colts. It is run over a distance of 1,600 metres (about 1 mile) at Longchamp in May. It is France's equivalent of the 2000 Guineas run in Britain.

== History ==
=== Origins ===
The Poule d'Essai, an event for three-year-old colts and fillies, was established in France in 1840. It was inspired by two races in England, the 2000 Guineas (for colts and fillies) and the 1000 Guineas (for fillies only).

The race was initially staged at the Champ de Mars. Its first running was over one full circuit of the track (about 2,000 metres). It was cut to a three-quarter lap (1,500 metres) in 1841. It was cancelled due to insufficient entries in 1843 and 1844.

The Poule d'Essai was transferred to Longchamp in 1857. It was extended to 1,600 metres in 1867. It was abandoned because of the Franco-Prussian War in 1871. It continued to be run until 1882.

=== Modern version ===
The Poule d'Essai des Poulains was created in 1883, when the Poule d'Essai was divided into two separate races. The "Poulains" was restricted to colts, and the Poule d'Essai des Pouliches was reserved for fillies.

The events were cancelled throughout World War I, with no runnings from 1915 to 1918. There were two 1,800-metre replacement races at Chantilly in 1917. The version for colts was called the Critérium d'Essai des Poulains.

The "Poulains" and "Pouliches" were not run in the spring of 1940, but a substitute combining both races took place at Auteuil in October. Titled the Prix d'Essai, it was won by the colt Djebel.

The Poule d'Essai des Poulains was held at Le Tremblay in 1943, and Maisons-Laffitte in 1944 and 1945.

The present race grading system was introduced in 1971, and the event was given Group 1 status. It was switched from Longchamp's middle course (moyenne piste) to the main course (grande piste) in 1987.

The leading horses from the Poule d'Essai des Poulains sometimes go on to compete in the Prix du Jockey Club. The last to win both races was St Mark's Basilica in 2021.

== Records ==
Leading jockey (6 wins):

- Freddy Head – Green Dancer (1975), Red Lord (1976), Blushing John (1988), Linamix (1990), Hector Protector (1991), Shanghai (1992)

Leading trainer (11 wins):

- Robert Denman – Regain (1883), Archiduc (1884), Vinicius (1903), Gouvernant (1904), Val d'Or (1905), Ouadi Halfa (1907), Lord Burgoyne (1911), Dagor (1913), Le Traquet (1921), Sir Gallahad (1923), Asterus (1926)

Leading owner (8 wins):

- Edmond Blanc – Arreau (1896), Governor (1900), Vinicius (1903), Gouvernant (1904), Val d'Or (1905), Ouadi Halfa (1907), Lord Burgoyne (1911), Dagor (1913)
- HH Aga Khan IV – Buisson Ardent (1956), Zeddaan (1968), Kalamoun (1973), Blushing Groom (1977), Nishapour (1978), Ashkalani (1996), Daylami (1997), Sendawar (1999)

== Winners since 1970 ==
Year	Winner	Jockey	Trainer	Owner	Time
1970	Caro ^{[a]}	Bill Williamson	Albert Klimscha	Countess Batthyany	1:41.30
1971	Zug	Jean-Claude Desaint	John Cunnington Sr.	William Hawn	1:37.60
1972	Riverman	Jean-Claude Desaint	Alec Head	Germaine Wertheimer	1:38.60
1973	Kalamoun	Henri Samani	François Mathet	HH Aga Khan IV	1:41.80
1974	Moulines	Maurice Philipperon	Richard Carver Jr.	Junzo Kashiyama	1:43.90
1975	Green Dancer	Freddy Head	Alec Head	Jacques Wertheimer	1:39.30
1976	Red Lord	Freddy Head	Alec Head	Jacques Wertheimer	1:42.30
1977	Blushing Groom	Henri Samani	François Mathet	HH Aga Khan IV	1:41.80
1978	Nishapour	Henri Samani	François Mathet	HH Aga Khan IV	1:46.10
1979	Irish River	Maurice Philipperon	John Cunnington Jr.	Mrs Raymond Adès	1:39.80
1980	In Fijar	Georges Doleuze	Mitri Saliba	Mahmoud Fustok	1:38.40
1981	Recitation	Greville Starkey	Guy Harwood	Anthony Bodie	1:40.70
1982	Melyno	Yves Saint-Martin	François Mathet	Stavros Niarchos	1:38.60
1983	L'Emigrant	Cash Asmussen	François Boutin	Stavros Niarchos	1:46.30
1984	Siberian Express	Alfred Gibert	André Fabre	Mahmoud Fustok	1:35.80
1985	No Pass No Sale ^{[b]}	Yves Saint-Martin	Robert Collet	Richard Strauss	1:38.10
1986	Fast Topaze	Cash Asmussen	Georges Mikhalidès	Mahmoud Fustok	1:48.30
1987	Soviet Star	Greville Starkey	André Fabre	Sheikh Mohammed	1:36.20
1988	Blushing John	Freddy Head	François Boutin	Allen Paulson	1:37.20
1989	Kendor	Maurice Philipperon	Raymond Touflan	Adolf Bader	1:36.10
1990	Linamix	Freddy Head	François Boutin	Jean-Luc Lagardère	1:35.90
1991	Hector Protector	Freddy Head	François Boutin	Stavros Niarchos	1:37.60
1992	Shanghai	Freddy Head	François Boutin	Stavros Niarchos	1:38.20
1993	Kingmambo	Cash Asmussen	François Boutin	Stavros Niarchos	1:39.10
1994	Green Tune	Olivier Doleuze	Criquette Head	Jacques Wertheimer	1:37.40
1995	Vettori	Frankie Dettori	Saeed bin Suroor	Maktoum Al Maktoum / Godolphin	1:40.40
1996	Ashkalani	Gérald Mossé	Alain de Royer-Dupré	HH Aga Khan IV	1:37.60
1997	Daylami	Gérald Mossé	Alain de Royer-Dupré	HH Aga Khan IV	1:42.60
1998	Victory Note	John Reid	Peter Chapple-Hyam	Magnier / Sangster	1:34.50
1999	Sendawar	Gérald Mossé	Alain de Royer-Dupré	HH Aga Khan IV	1:36.20
2000	Bachir	Frankie Dettori	Saeed bin Suroor	Godolphin	1:39.40
2001	Vahorimix ^{[c]}	Christophe Soumillon	André Fabre	Jean-Luc Lagardère	1:35.40
2002	Landseer	Michael Kinane	Aidan O'Brien	Tabor / Magnier	1:36.80
2003	Clodovil	Christophe Soumillon	André Fabre	Lagardère Family	1:36.40
2004	American Post	Richard Hughes	Criquette Head-Maarek	Khalid Abdullah	1:36.50
2005	Shamardal	Frankie Dettori	Saeed bin Suroor	Godolphin	1:39.20
2006	Aussie Rules	Kieren Fallon	Aidan O'Brien	Magnier / Tabor / Salman	1:37.00
2007	Astronomer Royal	Colm O'Donoghue	Aidan O'Brien	Smith / Tabor / Magnier	1:37.10
2008	Falco	Olivier Peslier	Carlos Laffon-Parias	Wertheimer et Frère	1:35.60
2009	Silver Frost	Christophe Soumillon	Yves de Nicolay	John Cotton	1:35.43
2010	Lope de Vega	Maxime Guyon	André Fabre	Gestüt Ammerland	1:36.10
2011	Tin Horse	Thierry Jarnet	Didier Guillemin	Marquesa de Moratalla	1:36.33
2012	Lucayan	Stéphane Pasquier	François Rohaut	Mouknass / Pandora	1:37.11
2013	Style Vendome	Thierry Thulliez	Nicolas Clément	André de Ganay / Baillet	1:34.68
2014	Karakontie	Stéphane Pasquier	Jonathan Pease	Niarchos Family	1:41.06
2015	Make Believe	Olivier Peslier	André Fabre	Prince A A Faisal	1:36.85
2016	The Gurkha^{[d]}	Ryan Moore	Aidan O'Brien	Smith / Tabor / Magnier	1:36.97
2017	Brametot^{[d]}	Cristian Demuro	Jean-Claude Rouget	Al Shaqab / Augustin-Normand	1:36.82
2018	Olmedo	Cristian Demuro	Jean-Claude Rouget	Ecurie Antonio Caro & Gerard Augustin-Normand	1:37.72
2019	Persian King	Pierre-Charles Boudot	André Fabre	Godolphin & Ballymore Thoroughbred	1:38.98
2020	Victor Ludorum^{[e]}	Mickael Barzalona	André Fabre	Godolphin	1:34.14
2021	St Mark's Basilica	Ioritz Mendizabal	Aidan O'Brien	Smith / Tabor / Magnier	1:40.15
2022	Modern Games	William Buick	Charlie Appleby	Godolphin	1:34.98
2023	Marhaba Ya Sanafi	Mickael Barzalona	Andreas Schütz	Jaber Abdullah	1:38.56
2024	Metropolitan	Alexis Pouchin	Mario Baratti	Peter R Bradley III & Scuderia Scolari	1:37.84
2025	Henri Matisse	Ryan Moore	Aidan O'Brien	Magnier, Tabor, Smith & Merriebelle Irish Farm	1:33.91
2026	Rayif	Mickael Barzalona	Francis-Henri Graffard	Aga Khan Studs Scea	1:38.63

^{a} Faraway Son finished first in 1970, but he was relegated to third place following a stewards' inquiry.
^{b} River Mist finished first in 1985, but he was relegated to fourth place following a stewards' inquiry.
^{c} Noverre was first in 2001, but he was subsequently disqualified after testing positive for a banned substance.
^{d} The 2016 and 2017 runnings took place at Deauville while Longchamp was closed for redevelopment.
^{e} The 2020 running took place at Deauville on 1 June as Longchamp was closed owing to the COVID-19 pandemic.

== Earlier winners ==
=== Poule d'Essai ===
- 1840: Giges
- 1841: Fiammetta
- 1842: Annetta
- 1843–44: no race
- 1845: Commodor Napier
- 1846: Philip Shah
- 1847: Tronquette
- 1848: Gambetti
- 1849: Experience
- 1850: Saint Germain
- 1851: First Born
- 1852: Bounty
- 1853: Moustique
- 1854: Nancy
- 1855: Monarque
- 1856: Nat
- 1857: Florin
- 1858: Brocoli
- 1859: Bakaloum
- 1860: Gustave
- 1861: Isabella
- 1862: Stradella
- 1863: Stentor
- 1864: Baronella
- 1865: Gontran
- 1866: Puebla
- 1867: Nicolet
- 1868: Gouvernail
- 1869: Consul
- 1870: Valois
- 1871: no race
- 1872: Revigny
- 1873: Sire
- 1874: Novateur
- 1875: Saint Cyr
- 1876: Enguerrande
- 1877: Fontainebleau
- 1878: Clementine
- 1879: Zut
- 1880: Le Destrier
- 1881: Promethee
- 1882: Barbe Bleu

=== Poule d'Essai des Poulains ===
- 1883: Regain
- 1884: Archiduc
- 1885: Xaintrailles
- 1886: Gamin
- 1887: Brio
- 1888: Reyezuelo
- 1889: Phlegethon
- 1890: Heaume
- 1891: Le Hardy
- 1892: Fra Angelico
- 1893: Le Nicham
- 1894: Beaujolais
- 1895: Launay
- 1896: Arreau
- 1897: Indian Chief
- 1898: Rodilard
- 1899: Perth
- 1900: Governor
- 1901: Cheri
- 1902: Retz
- 1903: Vinicius
- 1904: Gouvernant
- 1905: Val d'Or
- 1906: Eider
- 1907: Ouadi Halfa
- 1908: Monitor
- 1909: Verdun
- 1910: Sifflet
- 1911: Lord Burgoyne
- 1912: De Viris
- 1913: Dagor
- 1914: Listman
- 1915–18: no race
- 1919: McKinley
- 1920: Pendennis
- 1921: Le Traquet
- 1922: Mont Blanc
- 1923: Sir Gallahad
- 1924: Tapin
- 1925: Faraway
- 1926: Asterus
- 1927: Fiterari
- 1928: Dark Lantern
- 1929: Vatout
- 1930: Xandover
- 1931: Indus
- 1932: Le Becau
- 1933: Rodosto
- 1934: Brantome
- 1935: Kant
- 1936: Davout
- 1937: Drap d'Or
- 1938: Gaspillage
- 1939: Mac Kann
- 1940: Djebel
- 1941: Panipat
- 1942: Hexton
- 1943: Dogat
- 1944: Prince Bio
- 1945: Mistral
- 1946: Pactole
- 1947: Tourment
- 1948: Rigolo
- 1949: Amour Drake
- 1950: Tantieme
- 1951: Free Man
- 1952: Guersant
- 1953: Cobalt
- 1954: Cote d'Or
- 1955: Klairon
- 1956: Buisson Ardent
- 1957: Tyrone
- 1958: Pres du Feu
- 1959: Thymus
- 1960: Mincio
- 1961: Right Royal
- 1962: Adamastor
- 1963: Relko
- 1964: Neptunus
- 1965: Cambremont
- 1966: Soleil
- 1967: Blue Tom
- 1968: Zeddaan
- 1969: Don II

== See also ==
- List of French flat horse races
