= Prix Noailles =

Flat horse race in France

- Class: Group 3
- Location: Longchamp Racecourse; Paris, France
- Inaugurated: 1878
- Race type: Flat / Thoroughbred
- Website: france-galop.com

Race information
- Distance: 2,100 metres (1m 2½f)
- Surface: Turf
- Track: Right-handed
- Qualification: Three-year-olds
- Weight: 58 kg Allowances; 1½ kg for fillies
- Purse: €80,000 (2019); 1st: €40,000

Prix Noailles
2025
Uther	Nitoi	Sirius Brown

Previous years
2024
Calandagan	Bright Picture	Trafalgar Square
2023
Flight Leader	Harry Way	Fortune
2022
Junko	Maximus	Garachico
2021
Cheshire Academy	Pretty Tiger	Gregolimo

2020-2011
2019
Slalom	Syrtis	Surrey Thunder
2018
Pharrell	Alhadab	Flag Of Honour
2017
Soleil Marin	Akihiro	Normandy Eagle
2016
Raseed	More Than A Dream	Valkena
2015
Karaktar	High Dynamite	Best Of Max
2014
Gailo Chop	Aventador	Gallante
2013
Tableaux	Kapour	Art Contemporain
2012
Hard Dream	Health Wise	Valdo Bere
2011
Grand Vent	Durer	Touz Price

2010-2001
2010
Planteur	Rewilding	Ivory Land
2009
Grandcamp	Guest Ville	Wajir
2008
Full Of Gold	Court Canibal	Blue Bresil
2007
Soldier Of Fortune	Spirit One	Spycrawler
2006
Gentlewave	Bremen	Grand Couturier
2005
Ruwi	Gold Sound	Silver Cross
2004
Voix Du Nord	Cherry Mix	Fast And Furious
2003
Super Celebre	Coroner	Jipapibaquigrafo
2002
Ballingarry	Great Pretender	Stydahar
2001
Anabaa Blue	Gris De Fer	Worthily

2000-1990
2000
Kutub	Lord Flasheart	Ciro
1999
Slickly	State Shinto	Murray River
1998
Special Quest	Roli Abi	Jeopardy
1997
Fragrant Mix	Sendoro	Shaka
1996
Helissio	Arbatax	Oliviero
1995
Walk On Mix	Solar One	Poliglote
1994
Gunboat Diplomacy	Smart Wise	Thames
1993
Fort Wood	Marchand De Sable	Sawasdee
1992
Grand Plaisir	Modhish	Glaieul
1991
Pistolet Bleu	Subotica	Pigeon Voyageur
1990
Intimiste	Gargarin	Aksar

The Prix Noailles is a Group 3 flat horse race in France open to three-year-old thoroughbred colts and fillies. It is run over a distance of 2,100 metres (about 1 mile and 2½ furlongs) at Longchamp in April.

== History ==
The event was established in 1878, and it was originally called the Prix du Nabob. It was named after The Nabob, a leading sire in France. Its distance was 2,500 metres.

The Prix du Nabob was one of several trials for the Prix du Jockey Club collectively known as the Poules des Produits. The others (listed by their modern titles) were the Prix Daru, the Prix Lupin, the Prix Hocquart and the Prix Greffulhe. The Prix du Nabob was restricted to the produce of mares covered by stallions born outside France. It was funded by entries submitted before a horse's birth, in the year of conception.

The race was renamed in memory of Alfred de Noailles (1823–1895), a member of the Société d'Encouragement, in 1896. Noailles played an important role in the creation of Longchamp Racecourse.

The Prix Noailles was cut to 2,400 metres in 1902. It was abandoned throughout World War I, with no running from 1915 to 1919.

The race was cancelled once during World War II, in 1940. For a period it merged with the Prix Daru. The combined event, the Prix Daru-Noailles, was run over 2,150 metres at Le Tremblay in 1943. It was run over 2,100 metres at Maisons-Laffitte in 1944 and 1945, and at Longchamp in 1946.

In the post-war years, the Prix Noailles was contested over 2,200 metres. It was cut to 2,100 metres in 2005. It was shortened to 2,000 metres in 2011, and reverted to 2,100 metres in 2012. In 2014 it was downgraded from Group 2 to Group 3.

Twelve winners of the race have achieved victory in the Prix du Jockey Club. The first was Zut in 1879, and the most recent was Anabaa Blue in 2001.

== Records ==
Leading jockey (6 wins):

- Freddy Head – Goodly (1969), Dragoon (1970), Val de l'Orne (1975), Lydian (1981), Nerio (1988), Grand Plaisir (1992)

Leading trainer (14 wins):

- André Fabre – Jeu de Paille (1983), Cariellor (1984), Dancehall (1989), Fort Wood (1993), Walk on Mix (1995), Fragrant Mix (1997), Slickly (1999), Gentlewave (2006), Grand Vent (2011), Tableaux (2013), Soleil Marin (2017), Slalom (2019), Junko (2022), Flight Leader (2023)

Leading owner (4 wins):

- Marcel Boussac – Irismond (1924), Pharis (1939), Giafar (1947), Faublas (1953)
- Guy de Rothschild – Diatome (1965), Premier Violon (1966), Luthier (1968), Jeu de Paille (1983)
- Wertheimer et Frère - Special Quest (1998), Slalom (2019), Junko (2022), Uther (2025)

== Winners since 1978 ==
Year	Winner	Jockey	Trainer	Owner	Time
1978	Gracias	Jean-Claude Desaint	John Cunnington Jr.	Mrs Pierre Ribes	2:36.00
1979	High Sierra	Michel Jerome	E. Chevalier du Fau	Ella Widener Wetherill	2:22.20
1980	Julius Caesar	Henri Samani	Serge Boullenger	R. W. Dilley	2:19.90
1981	Lydian	Freddy Head	Criquette Head	Ecurie Åland	2:21.80
1982	Persepolis	Lester Piggott	François Boutin	Stavros Niarchos	2:23.00
1983	Jeu de Paille	Henri Samani	André Fabre	Guy de Rothschild	2:37.40
1984	Cariellor	Alfred Gibert	André Fabre	Suzy Volterra	2:20.10
1985	Glaros	Éric Legrix	Patrick Biancone	Richard Eamer	2:23.90
1986	Bering	Gary W. Moore	Criquette Head	Ghislaine Head	2:44.00
1987	Sadjiyd	Yves Saint-Martin	Alain de Royer-Dupré	HH Aga Khan IV	2:19.30
1988	Nerio	Freddy Head	Gérard Collet	Ecurie du Ring	2:22.40
1989	Dancehall	Cash Asmussen	André Fabre	Tomohiro Wada	2:22.50
1990	Intimiste	Gérald Mossé	François Boutin	Niccolò Incisa Rocchetta	2:27.10
1991	Pistolet Bleu	Dominique Boeuf	Élie Lellouche	Daniel Wildenstein	2:19.00
1992	Grand Plaisir	Freddy Head	J. C. Cunnington	Taisuke Fujishima	2:28.40
1993	Fort Wood	Walter Swinburn	André Fabre	Sheikh Mohammed	2:31.50
1994	Gunboat Diplomacy	Olivier Peslier	Élie Lellouche	Daniel Wildenstein	2:34.10
1995	Walk on Mix	Thierry Jarnet	André Fabre	Jean-Luc Lagardère	2:18.70
1996	Helissio	Dominique Boeuf	Élie Lellouche	Enrique Sarasola	2:14.50
1997	Fragrant Mix	Thierry Jarnet	André Fabre	Jean-Luc Lagardère	2:16.50
1998	Special Quest	Olivier Doleuze	Criquette Head	Wertheimer et Frère	2:29.10
1999	Slickly	Olivier Peslier	André Fabre	Jean-Luc Lagardère	2:17.00
2000	Kutub	Davy Bonilla	Freddy Head	Hamdan Al Maktoum	2:20.60
2001	Anabaa Blue	Christophe Soumillon	Carlos Lerner	Charles Mimouni	2:35.90
2002	Ballingarry	Jamie Spencer	Aidan O'Brien	Sue Magnier	2:17.30
2003	Super Celebre	Dominique Boeuf	Élie Lellouche	Ecurie Wildenstein	2:19.90
2004	Voix du Nord	Christophe Soumillon	David Smaga	Thierry van Zuylen	2:17.47
2005	Ruwi	Ioritz Mendizabal	Jean-Claude Rouget	Robert Bousquet	2:21.10
2006	Gentlewave	Olivier Peslier	André Fabre	Gary Tanaka	2:11.00
2007	Soldier of Fortune	Christophe Soumillon	Aidan O'Brien	Magnier / Tabor / Smith	2:07.40
2008	Full of Gold	Thierry Gillet	Criquette Head-Maarek	Alec Head	2:22.50
2009	Grandcamp	Christophe Lemaire	Jean-Claude Rouget	Daniel-Yves Trèves	2:10.77
2010	Planteur	Anthony Crastus	Élie Lellouche	Ecurie Wildenstein	2:12.04
2011	Grand Vent	Maxime Guyon	André Fabre	Godolphin	2:05.42
2012	Hard Dream (Note: The 2012 winner Hard Dream was later exported to Hong Kong and renamed Chater Dream)	Stéphane Pasquier	François Rohaut	Pandora Stud	2:29.37
2013	Tableaux	Maxime Guyon	André Fabre	Smith / Tabor	2:19.07
2014	Gailo Chop	Julien Augé	Antoine de Watrigant	Oti / Chopard	2:09.33
2015	Karaktar	Christophe Soumillon	Alain de Royer-Dupré	Aga Khan IV	2:08.61
2016	Raseed (Note: The 2016 and 2017 runnings took place at Chantilly while Longchamp was closed for redevelopment)	Aurelien Lemaitre	Freddy Head	Hamdan Al Maktoum	2:12.08
2017	Soleil Marin	Mickael Barzalona	André Fabre	Godolphin	2:08.34
2018	Pharrell	Jean-Bernard Eyquem	Jean-Claude Rouget	Sarl Ecurie J L Tepper	2:23.51
2019	Slalom	Maxime Guyon	André Fabre	Wertheimer et Frère	2:10.88
	no race 2020 (Note: The 2020 running was cancelled because of the COVID-19 pandemic in France)
2021	Pretty Tiger	Mickael Barzalona	Fabrice Vermeulen	White Birch Farm	2:20.55
2022	Junko	Maxime Guyon	André Fabre	Wertheimer et Frère	2:12.14
2023	Flight Leader	Bauyrzhan Murzabayev	André Fabre	Exors Of The Late K Abdullah	2:18.69
2024	Calandagan	Stéphane Pasquier	Francis-Henri Graffard	Aga Khan IV	2:13.56
2025	Uther	Mickael Barzalona	Christophe Ferland	Wertheimer et Frère	2:10.60
2026	Pearled Majesty	Christophe Soumillon	Mauricio Delcher Sanchez	Mme Christiane Head & M Delcher Sanchez	2:09.33

== Earlier winners ==
- 1878: Clementine
- 1879: Zut
- 1880: Pacific
- 1881: Forum
- 1882: Cimier
- 1883: Vernet
- 1884: Pi Ouit
- 1885: Aida
- 1886: Verdiere
- 1887: Gournay
- 1888: Walter Scott
- 1889: Achille
- 1890: Alicante
- 1891: Primrose
- 1892: Saint Michel
- 1893: Chapeau Chinois
- 1894: Ravioli
- 1895: Cherbourg
- 1896: Riposte
- 1897: Flacon
- 1898: Le Guide
- 1899: Maurice
- 1900: Royal
- 1901: Tibere
- 1902: Glacier
- 1903: Quo Vadis
- 1904: Ajax
- 1905: Jardy
- 1906: Querido
- 1907: La Serqueuse
- 1908: Souvigny
- 1909: Aveu
- 1910: Aloes III
- 1911: Combourg
- 1912: Imperial
- 1913: Vulcain
- 1914: Durbar
- 1915–19: no race
- 1920: Pendennis
- 1921: Meisonnier
- 1922: Kibar
- 1923: Grand Guignol
- 1924: Irismond
- 1925: Red Hawk
- 1926: Biribi
- 1927: Fenimore Cooper
- 1928: Le Correge
- 1929: Dark Times
- 1930: Chateau Bouscaut
- 1931: Brasik
- 1932: Bosphore
- 1933: Bengal
- 1934: Zenodore
- 1935: Bouillon
- 1936: Fastnet
- 1937: Actor
- 1938: Anchois
- 1939: Pharis
- 1940: no race
- 1941: Nepenthe
- 1942: Arcot
- 1943: Norseman
- 1944: Prince Bio
- 1945: His Eminence
- 1946: Prince Chevalier
- 1947: Giafar
- 1948: Flush Royal
- 1949: Rancio
- 1950: Lacaduv
- 1951: Thelus
- 1952: Corindon
- 1953: Faublas
- 1954: Le Grand Bi
- 1955: Vimy
- 1956: Tanerko
- 1957: Weeping Willow
- 1958: Noelor
- 1959: Cousu d'Or
- 1960: Le Ventoux
- 1961: Match
- 1962: Val de Loir
- 1963: Calchaqui
- 1964: Le Fabuleux
- 1965: Diatome
- 1966: Premier Violon
- 1967: Roi Dagobert
- 1968: Luthier
- 1969: Goodly
- 1970: Dragoon
- 1971: Maryambre
- 1972: Sancy
- 1973: Eddystone
- 1974: D'Arras
- 1975: Val de l'Orne
- 1976: Twig Moss
- 1977: Catus

* The race was merged with the Prix Daru from 1943 to 1946.

== See also ==
- List of French flat horse races
- Recurring sporting events established in 1878 – the Prix Noailles is included under its original title, Prix du Nabob.
