= Bonzac =

- Commune
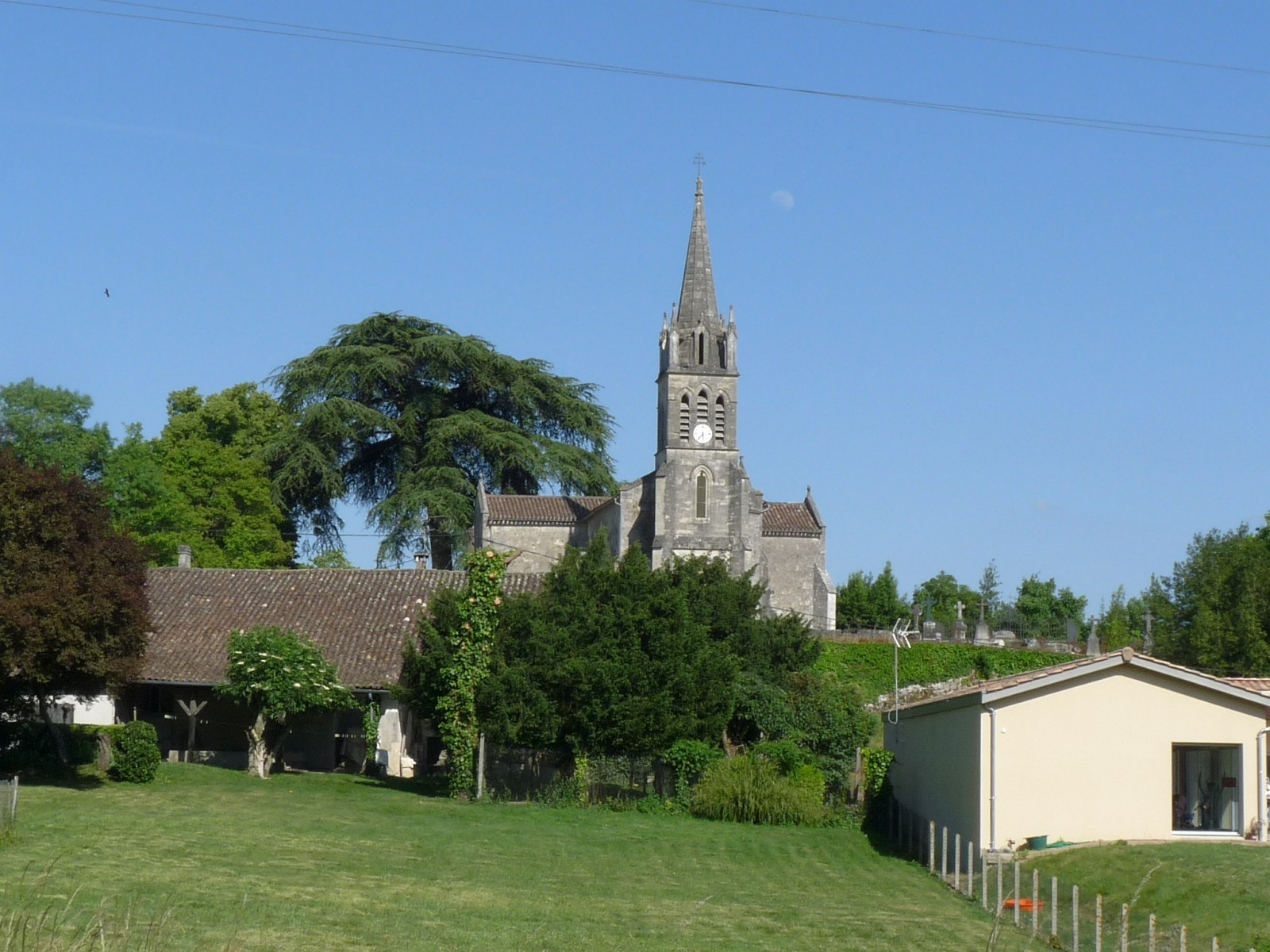
- A general view of Bonzac

- Coat of arms
- Location of Bonzac
- Location within France Location within Nouvelle-Aquitaine
- Coordinates: 45°00′28″N 0°13′16″W
- Country: France
- Region: Nouvelle-Aquitaine
- Department: Gironde
- Arrondissement: Libourne
- Canton: Le Nord-Libournais
- Intercommunality: CA Libournais

Government
  - Mayor (2020–2026): Jean-Luc Darquest
- Area^{1}: 7.49 km^{2} (2.89 sq mi)
- Highest elevation: 74 m (243 ft)
- Lowest elevation: 1 m (3.3 ft)
- Population (2023): 805
  - Density: 107/km^{2} (278/sq mi)
- Time zone: UTC+01:00 (CET)
  - Summer (DST): UTC+02:00 (CEST)
- INSEE/Postal code: 33062 /33910
- ^{1} French Land Register data, which excludes lakes, ponds, glaciers > 1 km^{2} (0.386 sq mi or 247 acres) and river estuaries.

Bonzac (French pronunciation: [bɔ̃ˈzak]) is a commune in the Gironde department in Nouvelle-Aquitaine in southwestern France.

== Population ==
Historical population
Year	Pop.	±% p.a.
1968	303	—
1975	349	+2.04%
1982	515	+5.72%
1990	618	+2.31%
1999	623	+0.09%
2007	691	+1.30%
2012	765	+2.06%
2017	747	−0.48%
2023	805	+1.25%
Source: INSEE

== See also ==
- Communes of the Gironde department
