= Prix Jean-Luc Lagardère =

Flat horse race in France

Prix Jean-Luc Lagardère Grand Critérium
- Class: Group 1
- Location: Longchamp Racecourse; Paris, France
- Inaugurated: 1853
- Race type: Flat / Thoroughbred
- Sponsor: Qatar
- Website: france-galop.com

Race information
- Distance: 1,400 metres (7f)
- Surface: Turf
- Track: Right-handed
- Qualification: Two-year-olds excluding geldings
- Weight: 57 kg Allowances; 1½ kg for fillies
- Purse: €400,000 (2021); 1st: €228,560

Prix Jean-Luc Lagardère
2026
| Amusingly | Folsom Blues | Man's Best Friend |

Previous years
2025
Puerto Rico | Nighttime | Rayif
2024
Camille Pissarro | Rashabar | Misunderstood
2023
Rosallion | Unquestionable | Beauvatier
2022
Belbek | Gamestop | Breizh Sky
2021
Angel Bleu | Noble Truth | Ancient Rome

2020-2011
2020
Sealiway | Nando Parrado | Laws Of Indices
2019
Victor Ludorum | Alson | Armory
2018
Royal Marine | Broome | Anodor
2017
Happily | Olmedo | Masar
2016
National Defense | Salouen | Whitecliffsofdover
2015
Ultra | Cymric | Galileo Gold
2014
Full Mast | Territories | Gleneagles
2013
Karakontie | Noozhoh Canarias | Charm Spirit
2012
Olympic Glory | What A Name | Indian Jade
2011
Dabirsim | Sofast | Salure

2010–2001
2010
Wootton Bassett | Maiguri | Tin Horse
2009
Siyouni | Pounced | Buzzword
2008
Naaqoos | Milanais | Intense Focus
2007
Rio De La Plata | Declaration Of War | Shediak
2006
Holy Roman Emperor | Battle Paint | Vital Equine
2005
Horatio Nelson | Opera Cape | Mauralakana
2004
Oratorio | Early March | Layman
2003
American Post | Charming Prince | Ximb
2002
Hold That Tiger | Le Vie Dei Colori | Intercontinental
2001
Rock Of Gibraltar | Bernebeau | Dobby Road

2000–1991
2000
Okawango | King's County | Honours List
1999
Ciro | Barathea Guest | Ocean Of Wisdom
1998
Way Of Light | Red Sea | Glamis
1997
Second Empire | Charge D'Affaires | Alboostan
1996
Revoque | Majorien | King Sound
1995
Loup Solitaire | Manninamix | Eternity Range
1994
Goldmark | Walk On Mix | Montjoy
1993
Lost World | Signe Divin | Psychobabble
1992
Tenby | Blush Rambler | Basim
1991
Arazi | Rainbow Corner | Seattle Rhyme

1990–1988
1990
Hector Protector | Masterclass | Beau Sultan
1989
Jade Robbery | Linamix | Honor Rajana
1988
Kendor | Along All | Ecossais

The Prix Jean-Luc Lagardère, formerly the Grand Critérium, is a Group 1 flat horse race in France open to two-year-old thoroughbred colts and fillies. It is run at Longchamp over a distance of 1,400 metres (about 7 furlongs), and it is scheduled to take place each year in early October.

It is France's oldest and most prestigious event for juvenile horses. It is the country's equal richest race for this age group, along with the Prix Morny. Each has a current purse of €400,000.

== History ==
The event was established in 1853, and it was originally called the Grand Critérium. It was initially contested over 1,500 metres at Chantilly. It was transferred to Longchamp in 1857, and extended to 1,600 metres in 1864. It was not run in 1870, because of the Franco-Prussian War.

The race was abandoned throughout World War I, with no running from 1914 to 1918. A substitute event called the Critérium des Deux Ans was staged at Maisons-Laffitte in 1918.

The Grand Critérium was cancelled in 1939 and 1940, due to World War II. On the second occasion it was substituted by a race at Auteuil, again titled the Critérium des Deux Ans. It was held at Le Tremblay in 1943 and 1944.

The present system of race grading was introduced in 1971, and the Grand Critérium was classed at the highest level, Group 1. For a period it took place in mid-October. It was brought forward to the Saturday of Prix de l'Arc de Triomphe weekend in 1989, and returned to its previous schedule in 1995.

France Galop, the governing body of French horse racing, restructured its program of Group 1 juvenile races in 2001. The Grand Critérium was cut to 1,400 metres and moved to the same day as the Prix de l'Arc de Triomphe. The latter event is traditionally held on the first Sunday in October. The distance was increased to 1,600 metres again in 2015 and dropped back to 1,400 in 2020 as part of a two-year trial.

The race was given its present title in 2003, in memory of Jean-Luc Lagardère (1928–2003). Lagardère was a successful racehorse owner/breeder and a former president of France Galop.

The Prix Jean-Luc Lagardère was added to the Breeders' Cup Challenge series in 2011. The winner now earns an automatic invitation to compete in the Breeders' Cup Juvenile Turf.

== Records ==
Leading jockey (6 wins):

- George Stern – Vinicius (1902), Ob (1903), Val d'Or (1904), Ouadi Halfa (1906), Durban (1920), Clavieres (1923)
- Roger Poincelet – Ambiorix (1948), Cosmos (1951), Tiepoletto (1958), Right Royal (1960), Hula Dancer (1962), Yelapa (1968)

Leading trainer (11 wins):

- Henry Jennings – Miss Cath (1855), Duchess (1856), Isabella (1860), Stradella (1861), Czar (1865), Revigny (1871), Jonquille (1875), Jongleur (1876), Mantille (1877), Basilique (1879), The Condor (1884)

Leading owner (10 wins):

- Susan Magnier - Second Empire (1997), Ciro (1999), Rock of Gibraltar (2001), Hold That Tiger (2002), Oratorio (2004), Horatio Nelson (2005), Holy Roman Empire (2006), Happily (2017), Camille Pissarro (2024), Puerto Rico (2025)

== Winners since 1969 ==
| Year | Winner | Jockey | Trainer | Owner | Time |
|---|---|---|---|---|---|
| 1969 | Breton | Lester Piggott | Mick Bartholomew | Peter Butler | 1:42.00 |
| 1970 | My Swallow | Lester Piggott | Paul Davey | David Robinson | 1:43.20 |
| 1971 | Hard to Beat | Bill Pyers | Richard Carver Jr. | S. Sokolov | 1:41.10 |
| 1972 | Satingo | Henri Samani | Alec Head | Germaine Wertheimer | 1:44.60 |
| 1973 | Mississipian | Bill Pyers | Maurice Zilber | Nelson Bunker Hunt | 1:39.70 |
| 1974 | Mariacci | Gérard Rivases | J. M. de Choubersky | Guy de Rothschild | 1:46.20 |
| 1975 | Manado | Philippe Paquet | François Boutin | Souren Vanian | 1:40.40 |
| 1976 | Blushing Groom | Henri Samani | François Mathet | HH Aga Khan IV | 1:44.70 |
| 1977 | Super Concorde | Philippe Paquet | François Boutin | Walter Haefner | 1:43.90 |
| 1978 | Irish River | Maurice Philipperon | John Cunnington Jr. | Mrs Raymond Adès | 1:39.00 |
| 1979 | Dragon | Alain Goldsztejn | Mitri Saliba | Mahmoud Fustok | 1:41.30 |
| 1980 | Recitation | Greville Starkey | Guy Harwood | Anthony Bodie | 1:44.20 |
| 1981 | Green Forest | Alfred Gibert | Mitri Saliba | Mahmoud Fustok | 1:46.20 |
| 1982 | Saint Cyrien | Freddy Head | Criquette Head | Ghislaine Head | 1:46.50 |
| 1983 | Treizieme | Gérard Dubroeucq | Maurice Zilber | Thomas Tatham | 1:38.80 |
| 1984 | Alydar's Best | Christy Roche | David O'Brien | Alan Clore | 1:49.00 |
| 1985 | Femme Elite | Alain Lequeux | Maurice Zilber | Serge Fradkoff | 1:40.00 |
| 1986 | Danishkada | Yves Saint-Martin | Alain de Royer-Dupré | HH Aga Khan IV | 1:40.70 |
| 1987 | Fijar Tango | Alfred Gibert | Georges Mikhalidès | Mahmoud Fustok | 1:45.20 |
| 1988 | Kendor | Maurice Philipperon | Raymond Touflan | Adolf Bader | 1:40.80 |
| 1989 | Jade Robbery | Cash Asmussen | André Fabre | Zenya Yoshida | 1:40.60 |
| 1990 | Hector Protector | Freddy Head | François Boutin | Stavros Niarchos | 1:41.10 |
| 1991 | Arazi | Gérald Mossé | François Boutin | Allen Paulson | 1:41.40 |
| 1992 | Tenby | Pat Eddery | Henry Cecil | Khalid Abdullah | 1:46.90 |
| 1993 | Lost World | Olivier Peslier | Élie Lellouche | Daniel Wildenstein | 1:45.90 |
| 1994 | Goldmark | Sylvain Guillot | André Fabre | Sheikh Mohammed | 1:43.40 |
| 1995 | Loup Solitaire | Olivier Peslier | André Fabre | Daniel Wildenstein | 1:37.60 |
| 1996 | Revoque | John Reid | Peter Chapple-Hyam | Robert Sangster | 1:37.70 |
| 1997 | Second Empire | Michael Kinane | Aidan O'Brien | Tabor / Magnier | 1:47.70 |
| 1998 | Way of Light | Cash Asmussen | Pascal Bary | Niarchos Family | 1:52.50 |
| 1999 | Ciro (Note: Barathea Guest finished first in 1999, but he was relegated to second place following a stewards' inquiry) | Michael Kinane | Aidan O'Brien | Tabor / Magnier | 1:50.50 |
| 2000 | Okawango | Olivier Doleuze | Criquette Head | Wertheimer et Frère | 1:41.80 |
| 2001 | Rock of Gibraltar | Michael Kinane | Aidan O'Brien | Ferguson / Magnier | 1:22.90 |
| 2002 | Hold That Tiger | Kieren Fallon | Aidan O'Brien | Tabor / Magnier | 1:20.40 |
| 2003 | American Post | Richard Hughes | Criquette Head-Maarek | Khalid Abdullah | 1:24.50 |
| 2004 | Oratorio | Jamie Spencer | Aidan O'Brien | Magnier / Tabor | 1:19.30 |
| 2005 | Horatio Nelson | Kieren Fallon | Aidan O'Brien | Magnier / Nagle | 1:20.60 |
| 2006 | Holy Roman Emperor | Kieren Fallon | Aidan O'Brien | Sue Magnier | 1:18.60 |
| 2007 | Rio de la Plata | Frankie Dettori | Saeed bin Suroor | Godolphin | 1:21.50 |
| 2008 | Naaqoos | Davy Bonilla | Freddy Head | Hamdan Al Maktoum | 1:18.40 |
| 2009 | Siyouni | Gérald Mossé | Alain de Royer-Dupré | HH Aga Khan IV | 1:19.50 |
| 2010 | Wootton Bassett | Paul Hanagan | Richard Fahey | Brady / Cosmic Cases | 1:23.00 |
| 2011 | Dabirsim | Frankie Dettori | Christophe Ferland | Simon Springer | 1:19.85 |
| 2012 | Olympic Glory | Richard Hughes | Richard Hannon Sr. | Joaan Bin Hamad Al Thani | 1:25.73 |
| 2013 | Karakontie | Stéphane Pasquier | Jonathan Pease | Niarchos family | 1:22.97 |
| 2014 | Full Mast (Note: Gleneagles finished first in 2014, but he was relegated to third place following a stewards' inquiry) | Thierry Thulliez | Criquette Head-Maarek | Khalid Abdullah | 1:20.11 |
| 2015 | Ultra | Mickael Barzalona | André Fabre | Godolphin | 1:37.27 |
| 2016 | National Defense (Note: The 2016 & 2017 runnings took place at Chantilly while Longchamp was closed for redevelopment.) | Pierre-Charles Boudot | Criquette Head-Maarek | Sun Bloodstock Sarl | 1:35.53 |
| 2017 | Happily | Ryan Moore | Aidan O'Brien | Magnier / Tabor / Smith | 1:38.51 |
| 2018 | Royal Marine | Oisin Murphy | Saeed bin Suroor | Godolphin | 1:39.10 |
| 2019 | Victor Ludorum | Mickael Barzalona | André Fabre | Godolphin | 1:44.15 |
| 2020 | Sealiway | Mickael Barzalona | Frederic Rossi | Haras de La Gousserie & Guy Pariente | 1:23.49 |
| 2021 | Angel Bleu | Frankie Dettori | Ralph Beckett | Marc Chan | 1:24.57 |
| 2022 | Belbek | Mickael Barzalona | André Fabre | Nurlan Bizakov | 1:22.98 |
| 2023 | Rosallion | Sean Levey | Richard Hannon Jr. | Sheikh Mohammed Obaid Al Maktoum | 1:18.23 |
| 2024 | Camille Pissarro | Christophe Soumillon | Aidan O'Brien | Tabor, Smith, Magnier & Brant | 1:20.58 |
| 2025 | Puerto Rico | Christophe Soumillon | Aidan O'Brien | Magnier, Tabor & Smith | 1:21.53 |
| 2026 | Amusingly | Colin Keane | Francis-Henri Graffard | Juddmonte | 1:19.40 |

== Earlier winners ==
- 1853: Celebrity
- 1854: Allez y Gaiement
- 1855: Miss Cath
- 1856: Duchess
- 1857: Tonnerre des Indes
- 1858: Nuncia
- 1859: Mon Etoile
- 1860: Isabella
- 1861: Stradella
- 1862: Damier
- 1863: Sonchamp
- 1864: Le Bearnais
- 1865: Czar
- 1866: Montgoubert
- 1867: Le Sarrazin
- 1868: Mademoiselle de Fligny
- 1869: Sornette
- 1870: no race
- 1871: Revigny
- 1872: Franc Tireur
- 1873: Fideline
- 1874: Perplexe
- 1875: Jonquille
- 1876: Jongleur
- 1877: Mantille
- 1878: Swift
- 1879: Basilique (Note: The 1879 race was decided by a run-off after a dead-heat between Basilique and Louis d'Or)
- 1880: Perplexite
- 1881: Vigilant
- 1882: Vernet
- 1883: Fra Diavolo
- 1884: The Condor
- 1885: Alger
- 1886: Frapotel
- 1887: Stuart
- 1888: May Pole
- 1889: Cromatella
- 1890: Reverend
- 1891: Rueil
- 1892: Marly
- 1893: Dolma Baghtche
- 1894: Le Sagittaire
- 1895: Hero
- 1896: Roxelane
- 1897: Cazabat
- 1898: Holocauste
- 1899: Ramadan
- 1900: Eryx
- 1901: Le Mandinet
- 1902: Vinicius
- 1903: Ob
- 1904: Val d'Or
- 1905: Prestige
- 1906: Ouadi Halfa
- 1907: Sauge Pourpree
- 1908: Golden Sky
- 1909: Uriel
- 1910: Faucheur
- 1911: Montrose
- 1912: Ecouen
- 1913: Le Grand Pressigny
- 1914–18: no race (Note: The 1918 substitute event at Maisons-Laffitte was won by Florina)
- 1919: Odol
- 1920: Durban
- 1921: Kefalin
- 1922: Epinard
- 1923: Clavieres
- 1924: Ptolemy
- 1925: Dorina
- 1926: Flamant
- 1927: Kantar
- 1928: Amorina
- 1929: Godiche
- 1930: Indus
- 1931: La Bourrasque
- 1932: Pantalon
- 1933: Brantôme
- 1934: Pampeiro
- 1935: Mistress Ford
- 1936: Teleferique
- 1937: Gossip
- 1938: Turbulent
- 1939–40: no race (Note: The 1940 replacement at Auteuil saw a dead-heat between Longthanh and Plaisir de France)
- 1941: Martia / Nosca (Note: The 1941 edition was a dead-heat and has joint winners)
- 1942: Caravelle
- 1943: Priam
- 1944: Taiaut
- 1945: Nirgal
- 1946: Clarion
- 1947: Rigolo
- 1948: Ambiorix
- 1949: Tantieme
- 1950: Sicambre
- 1951: Cosmos
- 1952: Dragon Blanc
- 1953: Le Geographe
- 1954: Beau Prince
- 1955: Apollonia
- 1956: Tyrone
- 1957: Bella Paola
- 1958: Tiepoletto
- 1959: Angers
- 1960: Right Royal
- 1961: Abdos
- 1962: Hula Dancer
- 1963: Neptunus
- 1964: Grey Dawn
- 1965: Soleil
- 1966: Silver Cloud
- 1967: Sir Ivor
- 1968: Yelapa

== See also ==
- List of French flat horse races
- Recurring sporting events established in 1853 – this race is included under its original title, Grand Critérium.
