= Prince Palatine =

British Thoroughbred racehorse

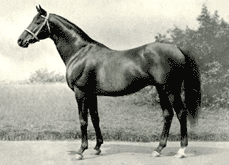
- Prince Palatine, 1920 -
- Sire: Persimmon
- Grandsire: St. Simon
- Dam: Lady Lightfoot
- Damsire: Isinglass
- Sex: Stallion
- Foaled: 1908
- Country: Ireland
- Colour: Bay
- Breeder: William Hall Walker
- Owner: Thomas Pilkington; Jack Barnato Joel
- Trainer: Henry Beardsley
- Record: 21:11-6-1
- Earnings: $184,555

Major wins
- Imperial Produce Plate (1910); Gordon Stakes (1911); St. Leger Stakes (1911); Eclipse Stakes (1912); Jockey Club Stakes (1912); Ascot Gold Cup (1912, 1913); Doncaster Cup (1912); Coronation Cup (1913)

Awards
- British Horse of the Year (1912, 1913)
- Last updated on September 26, 2006

Prince Palatine (1908–1924) was a British Thoroughbred racehorse. He was named for County Palatine of Lancaster near where his breeder William Hall Walker had been raised.

== Racing career ==
Racing at age two, Prince Palatine won three of his six starts. At age three, he began to improve and by September was in top form, winning the St. Leger Stakes by 6 lengths. Prince Palatine was the dominant horse in British racing in 1912 and 1913. Near the end of the 1913 racing season he was sold for a then record price of £45,000 to Jack Barnato Joel to stand at stud at Childwick Bury Stud in St. Albans, Hertfordshire.

== Stud career ==
Although Prince Palatine had a less than stellar stud career in England, he did sire Rose Prince who in turn produced the Belgian racing star Prince Rose, the sire of the important Princequillo. Among Prince Rose's other descendants are Kentucky Derby and Preakness Stakes winner, Canonero II, Preakness Stakes and Belmont Stakes winner Risen Star, Triple Crown winners Secretariat and Seattle Slew, American Horse of the Year winners Round Table, A.P. Indy, Cigar (twice) and Lady's Secret, and British Horse of the Year winners, Brigadier Gerard and Mill Reef. Prince Palatine also sired the mare Blue Glass, out of Hour Glass by Rock Sand. Blue Glass's descendants include Triple Crown winner Affirmed, his great rival and influential sire Alydar, the only horse ever to run second in the Kentucky Derby, Preakness Stakes and Belmont Stakes, and Native Dancer, winner of the Preakness Stakes and Belmont Stakes, Alysheba, winner of the Preakness Stakes and Kentucky Derby, as well as American Horse of the Year winners Curlin and Cigar, the #1 and #2 money winners of all time.

== Export ==
Jack B. Joel eventually sold him to Louis Jean Decazes of the Haras d'Ouilly in France. In 1920, his French owner sold him to the Xalapa Farm of Edward Francis Simms in Paris, Kentucky. Prince Palatine remained in the United States for the rest of his life, dying in a 1924 stable fire. He is buried at Xalapa Farm.

Gresely A3 Pacific No. 60052 Prince Palatine was named after this horse.

== Sire line tree ==
- Prince Palatine
  - Donnacona
  - Prince Galahad
    - Nothing Venture
      - Dink
  - Prince Pal
    - Mate
      - Elkridge
  - Rose Prince
    - Prince Rose
      - Joli Ange
      - Pappageno
        - Pappa Fourway
      - Princequillo
        - Hill Prince
        - Prince Simon
        - Prince Regent
        - Prince Hill
        - Dedicate
        - Prince John
        - Round Table
        - Prince Blessed
        - Brave Lad
        - Earldom
      - Prince Bio
        - Sicambre
        - Northern Light
        - Le Petit Prince
        - Prince Taj
        - Sedan
        - Montigny
      - Prince Chevalier
        - Arctic Prince
        - Pirate King
        - Pampered King
        - Court Harwell
        - Doutelle
        - Charlottesville
        - Soltikoff
