= Yves Saint-Martin =

Retired French champion jockey

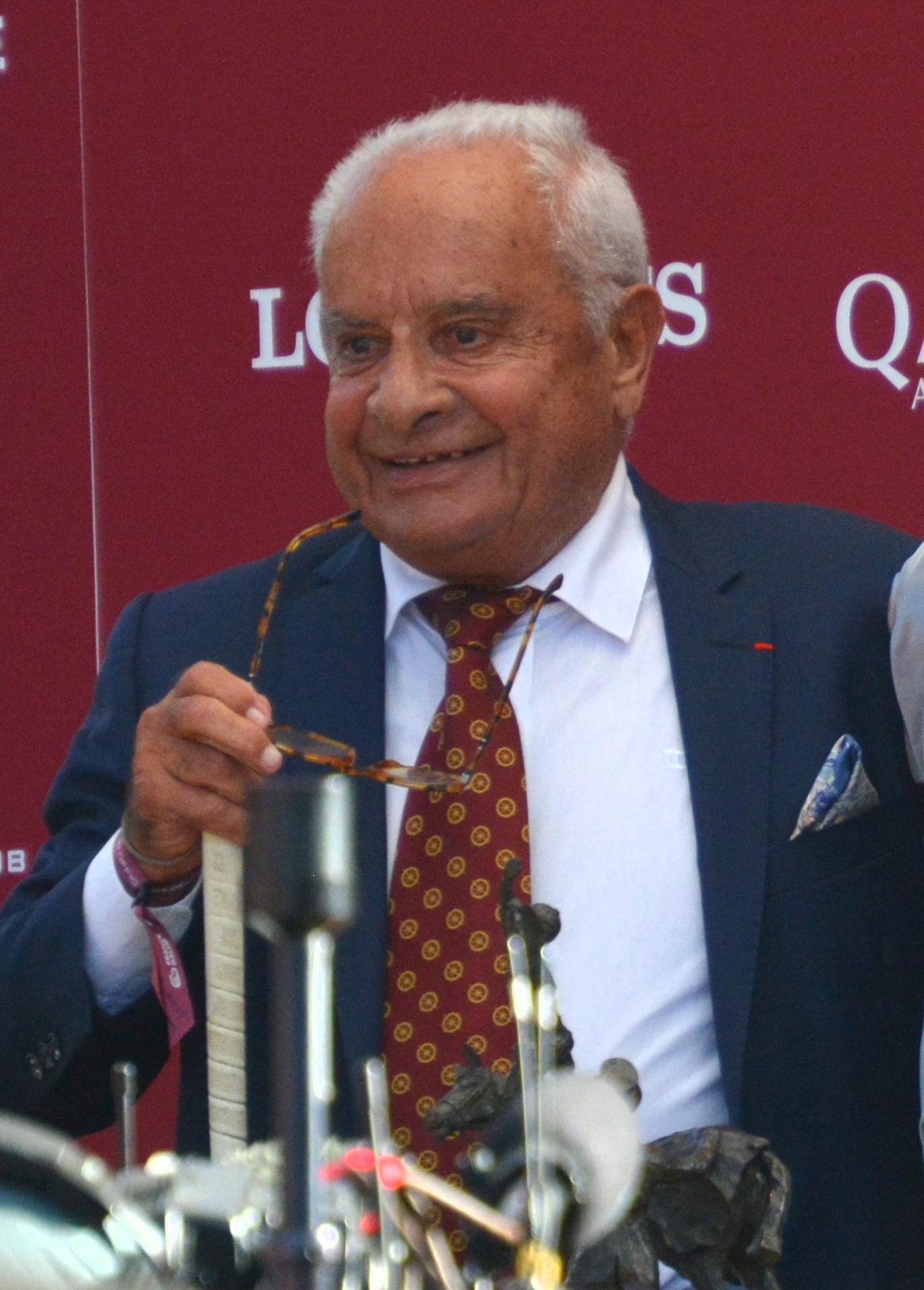

Personal information
- Born: 8 September 1941 (age 84) Agen, Lot-et-Garonne, France
- Occupation: Jockey

Horse racing career
- Sport: Horse racing
- Career wins: 3314

Major racing wins
- Prix de l'Arc de Triomphe (4); Poule d'Essai des Poulains (5); Poule d'Essai des Pouliches (7); Prix du Jockey Club (9); Prix de Diane (5); Prix Royal-Oak (4); Grand Prix de Saint-Cloud (7); Prix d'Ispahan (7); Grand Prix de Paris (4)

Racing awards
- Leading Jockey in France (15 times)

Significant horses
- Match II, La Sega, Relko, Reliance, Sassafras, Amber Rama, Altesse Royale, Rheingold, Allez France, Dahlia, Lianga, Pawneese, Exceller, Flying Water, Madelia, Sagace, Last Tycoon
- Updated on 25 January 2007

Yves Saint-Martin (born 8 September 1941 in Agen, Lot-et-Garonne, France) is a retired champion jockey in French Thoroughbred horse racing. He is widely considered one of the greatest riders in French racing history.

Saint-Martin won his first race on 26 July 1958 for Mme Suzy Volterra. He went on to be France leading jockey fifteen times, winning the title in 1960, 1962, 1963, 1964, 1965, 1966, 1967, 1968, 1969, 1973, 1974, 1975, 1976, 1981 and 1983.

In his career, Yves Saint-Martin won 3314 races worldwide, of which 3275 were in France. He is tied with three others for most wins (4) in the Prix de l'Arc de Triomphe and holds the record for most victories in several other Group One races, including the Prix du Jockey Club with nine. He has won a total of 30 Classics in France.

At Laurel Park Racecourse near Baltimore, Maryland, Saint-Martin won the 1962 Washington, D.C. International aboard Match II defeating both Carry Back and the Kelso.

He won the French "Academie des sports" award Prix Claude Foussier in 1971.

Now retired, Yves Saint-Martin is a collector of vintage automobiles, owning vehicles such as a Maserati, Ford Mustang, Rolls-Royce and Aston Martin. His son Eric is also a jockey who has raced in France and in Hong Kong.

== Major Wins ==
France

- Critérium de Saint-Cloud - (6) - Fire Crest (1967), Rheffic (1970), Ribecourt (1973), Tarek (1977), Darshaan (1983), Mouktar (1984)
- Grand Critérium - (1) - Danishkada (1986)
- Grand Prix de Paris - (4) - Reliance (1965), Danseur (1966), Exceller (1976), Sumayr (1985)
- Grand Prix de Saint-Cloud - (7) - Relko (1964), Rheingold (1972 & 1973), Dahlia (1974), Shakapour (dead-heat 1980), Akarad (1981), Strawberry Road (1985)
- Poule d'Essai des Poulains - (5) - Adamastor (1962), Relko (1963), Zeddaan (1968), Melyno (1982), No Pass No Sale (1985)
- Poule d'Essai des Pouliches - (7) - Solitude (1961), La Sega (1962), Pola Bella (1968), Koblenza (1969), Allez France (1973), Madelia (1977), Masarika (1984)
- Prix de l'Abbaye de Longchamp - (5) - Fortino (1962), Texanita (1963), Silver Shark (1965), Farhana (1966), Lianga (1975)
- Prix de l'Arc de Triomphe - (4) - Sassafras (1970), Allez France (1974), Akiyda (1982), Sagace (1984)
- Prix d'Astarté - (5) - Breloque (1960), Tamouré (1965), Cover Girl (1966), Gay Style (1974), Carolina Moon (1976)
- Prix du Cadran - (5) - Waldmeister (1965), Danseur (1967), Recupere (1974), Buckskin (1977 & 1978)
- Prix de Diane - (5) - La Sega (1962), Rescousse (1972), Allez France (1973), Pawneese (1976), Madelia (1977)
- Prix de la Forêt - (2) - Faraway Son (1971), African Sky (1973)
- Prix Ganay - (6) - Relko (1964), Taj Dewan (1968), Rheingold (1973), Allez France (1974 & 1975), Sagace (1985)
- Prix d'Ispahan - (7) - La Sega (1962), Jour et Nuit (1964), Silver Shark (1966), Zeddaan (1968), La Troublerie (1973), Allez France (1974), Crystal Glitters (1983)
- Prix Jacques le Marois - (3) - Dictus (1971), Lianga (1975), Flying Water (1977)
- Prix Jean Prat - (6) - Jour et Nuit (1964), Silver Shark (1966), Antipode (1974), Earth Spirit (1976), Melyno (1982), Ginger Brink (1983)
- Prix du Jockey-Club - (9) - Reliance (1965), Nelcius (1966), Tapalque (1968), Sassafras (1970), Acamas (1978), Top Ville (1979), Darshaan (1984), Mouktar (1985), Natroun (1987)
- Prix Lupin - (2) - Acamas (1978), Top Ville (1979)
- Prix Marcel Boussac - (3) - Allez France (1972), Theia (1975), Aryenne (1979)
- Prix Maurice de Gheest - (2) - Irish Minstrel (1970), Flying Water (1977)
- Prix Morny - (3) - Solitude (1960), Amber Rama (1969), Broadway Dancer (1974)
- Prix du Moulin de Longchamp - (4) - Silver Shark (1966), Pola Bella (1968), Faraway Son (1971), Gravelines (1976)
- Prix de l'Opéra - (3) - Sea Sands (1975), Waya (1977), Kilmona (1981)
- Prix Royal-Oak - (4) - Relko (1963), Reliance (1965), Sassafras (1970), Denel (1982)
- Prix Saint-Alary - (6) - Solitude (1961), La Sega (1962), Tonnera (1966), Saraca (1969), Madelia (1977), Grise Mine (1984)
- Prix de la Salamandre - (2) - Batitu (1967), Noblequest (1984)
- Prix Vermeille - (7) - Golden Girl (1963), Casaque Grise (1967), Saraca (1969), Allez France (1973), Paulista (1974), Sharaya (1983), Darara (1986)

Germany

- Preis von Europa - (1) - Sumayr (1985)

(United Kingdom) Great Britain

- 1,000 Guineas - (2) - Altesse Royale (1971), Flying Water (1976)
- 2,000 Guineas - (1) - Nonoalco (1974)
- Champion Stakes - (3) - Flying Water (1977), Vayrann (1981), Palace Music (1984)
- Coronation Cup - (2) - Dicta Drake (1962), Relko (1964)
- Coronation Stakes - (1) - Kesar Queen (1976)
- Epsom Derby - (1) - Relko (1963)
- Haydock Sprint Cup - (1) - Lianga (1975)
- July Cup - (1) - Lianga (1975)
- King George VI & Queen Elizabeth Stakes - (2) - Match II (1962), Pawneese (1976)
- King's Stand Stakes - (2) - Amber Rama (1970), Flirting Around (1975)
- Nunthorpe Stakes - (1) - Last Tycoon (1986)
- Epsom Oaks - (2) - Monade (1962), Pawneese (1976)
- St. Leger - (1) - Crow (1976)

(Republic of Ireland) Ireland

- Irish Derby - (1) - English Prince (1974)

Italy

- Gran Premio di Milano - (1) - Rouge Sang (1976)

United States

- Breeders' Cup Mile - (1) - Last Tycoon (1986)
- Hollywood Derby - (1) Slew The Dragon (1985)
- Breeders' Cup Turf - (1) - Lashkari (1984)
- Washington, D.C. International - (1) - Match II (1962)
