= Haras d'Ouilly =

The Haras d'Ouilly is a horse breeding farm in Pont-d'Ouilly, Calvados in the Normandy region of France established in the 19th century.

The property was purchased in 1895 by Auguste-Louis-Albéric, prince d'Arenberg for his son Pierre d'Arenberg who built the stables and established it as a horse breeding operation.

Haras d'Ouilly was acquired by the Louis Jean Decazes in 1916. He acquired several top broodmares and in 1918 purchased the prominent sire Prince Palatine from the English breeder Jack Barnato Joel. In 1921 Decazes partnered with François Dupré who would purchase 100% of Haras d'Ouilly in 1930.

François Dupré would turn Haras d'Ouilly into a powerhouse of European racing, running it until his death in 1966 when his widow took over. Anna Dupré continued to race horses until 1977 when she sold her bloodstock to the Aga Khan IV. In 1981, she sold the property to Jean-Luc Lagardère who too was a leading figure in French racing until his death in 2003 after which it was sold to the Aga Khan IV.
