= Pont-d'Ouilly =

- Commune
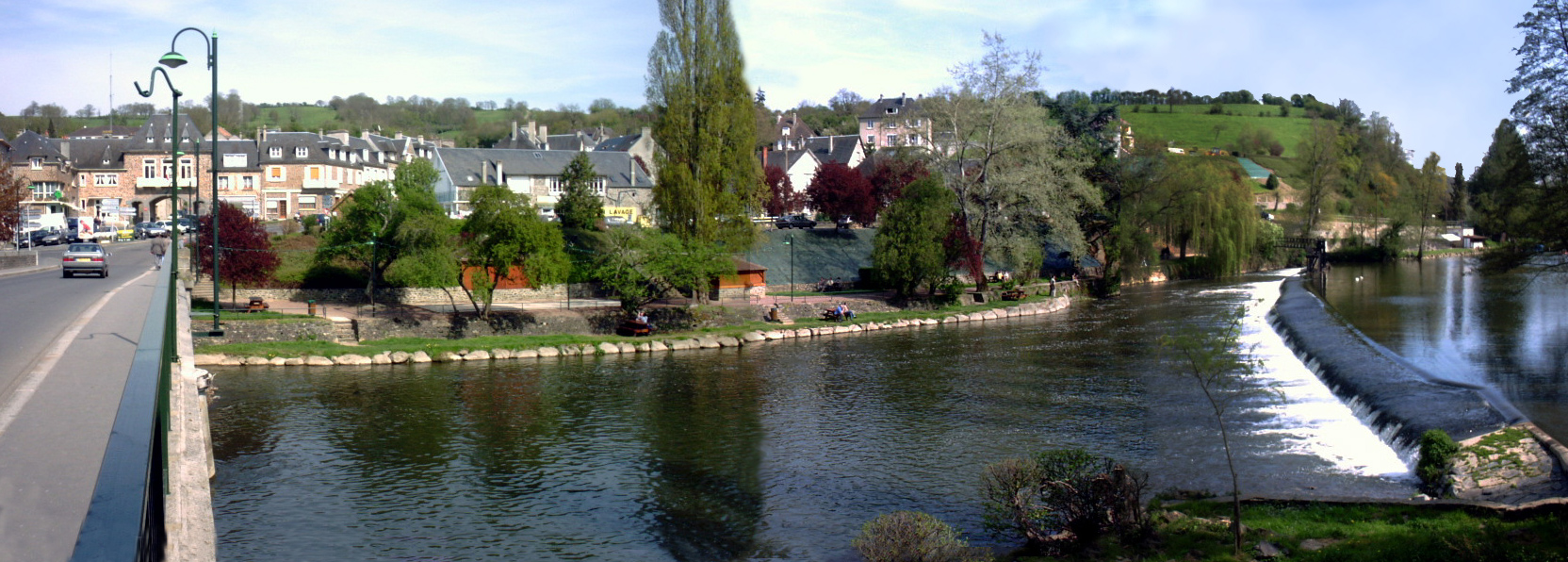
- The River Olme in Pont-d'Ouilly

- Coat of arms
- Location of Pont-d'Ouilly
- Location within France Location within Normandy
- Coordinates: 48°52′27″N 0°24′27″W
- Country: France
- Region: Normandy
- Department: Calvados
- Arrondissement: Caen
- Canton: Falaise
- Intercommunality: Pays de Falaise

Government
  - Mayor (2020–2026): Maryvonne Guibout
- Area^{1}: 19.50 km^{2} (7.53 sq mi)
- Highest elevation: 251 m (823 ft)
- Lowest elevation: 42 m (138 ft)
- Population (2023): 1,018
  - Density: 52.21/km^{2} (135.2/sq mi)
- Time zone: UTC+01:00 (CET)
  - Summer (DST): UTC+02:00 (CEST)
- INSEE/Postal code: 14764 /14691
- ^{1} French Land Register data, which excludes lakes, ponds, glaciers > 1 km^{2} (0.386 sq mi or 247 acres) and river estuaries.

Pont-d'Ouilly (French pronunciation: [pɔ̃ duji]) is a commune in the Calvados department in the Normandy region in northwestern France.

== Geography ==
The commune is part of the area known as Suisse Normande.

The commune is made up of the following collection of villages and hamlets, La Martelée, Le Rocray, Les Hogues, La Potiche, La Guérardière, Le Hameau Hue, Le Haut d'Ouilly, Les Îles d'Ouilly, Le Val Aubert and Pont-d'Ouilly. The commune is spread over an area of 19.5 square kilometres (4,800 acres) with a maximum altitude of 251 metres (823 ft 6 in) and minimum of 42 metres (137 ft 10 in)

The Commune with another 20 communes shares part of a 2,115 hectare, Natura 2000 conservation area, called the Vallée de l'Orne et ses affluents.

The rivers Orne and Noireau plus six streams, The Orival, The Val Corbel, La Boullonniere, The Val la Here, La Mare des Bois and La Mesliere flow through the commune.

=== Land distribution ===
The 2018 CORINE Land Cover assessment shows the vast majority of the land in the commune, 60% (1,177 hectares (2,910 acres)) is meadows followed by heterogeneous agricultural land at 15%. The rest of the land is forest at 13%, arable land at 10% and the remaining 2% (37 hectares (91 acres)) is urbanised.

== History ==
=== Pre 20th century ===
The commune has been occupied since at least the Roman times and has evidence that a medieval castle was here. The commune's history centres around the bridge which was an important place to cross the Orne, which until the 19th century, the bridge had eight arches. The bridge was rebuilt with just four arches between 1849 and 1851, however a year later a further arch was added after a rise in water levels destroyed part of the newly built bridge.

=== World War 2 ===
The bridge was destroyed again in 1944 from Allied bombing. On the 16th August 1944 the village was liberated by the XXX Corps of the United Kingdom.

=== Post war ===
The commune of Pont-d'Ouilly was created on 23 August 1947 from the merger of the two former communes of Saint-Marc-d'Ouilly and Ouilly-le-Basset (old INSEE code 14690), due to the financial and administrative difficulties of rebuilding the area after the war. The bridge, as seen today, was reconstructed in 1947.

== Population ==
Historical population

Year	Pop.	±% p.a.
1954	1,150	—
1962	1,194	+0.47%
1968	1,279	+1.15%
1975	1,230	−0.56%
1982	1,049	−2.25%
1990	1,002	−0.57%

Year	Pop.	±% p.a.
1999	1,050	+0.52%
2007	1,038	−0.14%
2012	1,015	−0.45%
2017	999	−0.32%
2023	1,018	+0.31%

Source: EHESS and INSEE (2006-2023)

== Points of Interest ==
- Haras d'Ouilly, is a famous Thoroughbred horse racing and breeding business currently owned by the Aga Khan IV.

== Culture ==
- Le festival des Extraverties is an annual 3 day festival organised each Spring by the Communauté de communes du Pays de Falaise and Communauté d'agglomération Flers Agglo. The festival is based on several sites within the Suisse Normande area, with Pont-d'ouilly being one of the annual sites used. The festival celebrates the activities that can be done in the local area while also featuring concerts and free shows. The festival has been going since 2017 and attracts about 20,000 people each time.

== Notable people ==
- Jean-Luc Lagardère - (1928 – 2003) a major French businessman and CEO of the Lagardère Group is buried here.

== Twin towns – sister cities ==
Pont-d'Ouilly is twinned with:

- Chipping Campden, England
- Hafenlohr, Germany

== See also ==
- Communes of the Calvados department
- Maurice Le Scouëzec
