= Jean-Luc Lagardère =

French businessman (1928–2003)

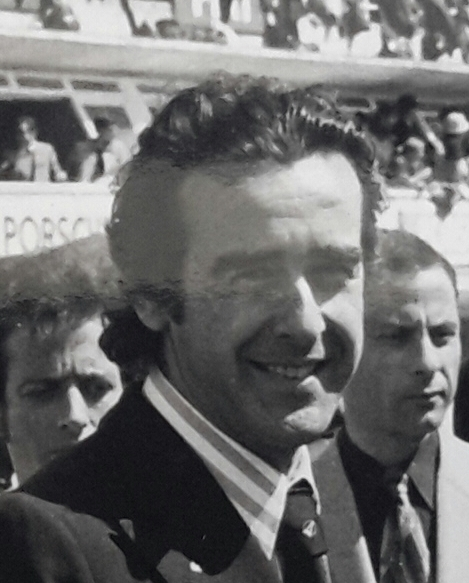
- Lagardère in 1972
- Born: 10 February 1928; Aubiet, France
- Died: 14 March 2003 (aged 75); Paris, France
- Resting place: Pont-d'Ouilly, France
- Education: Supélec
- Occupation: Businessman
- Spouses: Corinne Levasseur (m. 1958; div. 1978) Elisabeth Pimenta Lucas (m. 1993)
- Children: Arnaud Lagardère

Jean-Luc Lagardère (French pronunciation: [ʒɑ̃ lyk laɡaʁdɛʁ]; 10 February 1928 – 14 March 2003) was a French businessman, CEO of the Lagardère Group, one of the largest French conglomerates.

== Career ==
Jean-Luc Lagardère was a Supélec engineer. He began his career in Dassault Aviation. As CEO of Matra in the 1960s, he became famous with success in Formula One and Le Mans. He later built a large media and defense conglomerate that bears his name. He was a member of the Saint-Simon Foundation think-tank.

In 1981, with his friend Daniel Filipacchi, he purchased Hachette magazines, which included the French TV Guide (Tele 7 Jours), and the then-struggling Elle magazine. Elle was then launched in the U.S., followed by 25 foreign editions. Filipacchi and Lagardère then expanded Hachette Filipacchi Magazines in the U.S. with the purchase of Diamandis Communications Inc. (formerly CBS magazines), including Woman's Day, Car and Driver, Road and Track, Flying, Boating, and many others.

Despite setbacks, such as the costly failure of La Cinq TV channel, he led significant mergers that established EADS, today major global aerospace contractor Airbus. He handed over control of his businesses to his son Arnaud in 2001, under whom the Lagardère Group continued to thrive. Jean-Luc Lagardère's contributions were praised by President Jacques Chirac, highlighting his visionary leadership and commitment to European integration.

== Thoroughbred horse racing ==
Lagardère was a prominent figure in French horse racing. In 1981, he purchased the renowned Haras d'Ouilly stud in Pont-d'Ouilly, Calvados that had been owned by François Dupré and raced under their famous colors of gray with a pink cap. At one time, his operation had as many as 220 horses. He won the French owners' championship in 1998 and between 1995 and 2001 was the leading breeder in France. His most important racing win came with Sagamix who won the 1998 Prix de l'Arc de Triomphe.

Upon its formation in 1995, Jean-Luc Lagardère served as the first president of France-Galop. On his death in 2003, the business was taken over by his son Arnaud who sold Haras d'Ouilly and its entire bloodstock in 2005 to the Aga Khan IV.

In 2002, the Group One Grand Critérium race for two-year-olds at Longchamp Racecourse was renamed in his honor.

== Personal life ==
He first married Corinne Lagardère. They had one son, Arnaud. After his divorce, he married Betty Lagardère, whose birth name is Elisabeth Pimenta Lucas, a socialite and former Brazilian model who settled in France.

== Death ==
Lagardere died on March 14, 2003, from a rare neurological condition.

== Legacy ==
In honor of his contribution to Airbus, the company has chosen to name the Airbus A380 assembly plant in Toulouse after him. With production ending in 2022, the plant was then converted into the final assembly line for the Airbus A320 family.

== Bibliography ==
- Jean-Luc Lagardere at the NTRA
- Madjar, Robert (1997). Daniel Filipacchi. Editions Michel Lafon
