= Lunchtime (horse) =

British-bred Thoroughbred racehorse

- Sire: Silly Season
- Grandsire: Tom Fool
- Dam: Great Occasion
- Damsire: Hornbeam
- Sex: Stallion
- Foaled: 1970
- Country: United Kingdom
- Colour: Chestnut
- Owner: R D Poole
- Trainer: Peter Walwyn
- Record: 6: 3-1-0

Major wins
- Clarence House Stakes (1972); Dewhurst Stakes (1972)

Awards
- Timeform rating 123 (1972), 112 (1973)

Lunchtime (1970 – 1991) was a British Thoroughbred racehorse and sire. He was undefeated in three races as a two-year-old in 1972, including the Dewhurst Stakes and was regarded as a major contender for the British Classic Races. He failed to win in three starts in the following year and was retired to become a breeding stallion in Australia. He had some success as a sire of winners.

== Background ==
Lunchtime was a "tall, strong" chestnut horse with a white star and a white socks on his hind feet, bred in the United Kingdom. He was sired by Silly Season, a top-class American-bred horse who won the Champion Stakes in 1965. Lunchtime was the first foal of his dam Great Occasion, a moderate racehorse who won one minor race from five starts. She was descended from a relatively obscure branch of Thoroughbred family 7-f which also produced the Coronation Stakes winner Katies and Minnesota Mac who sired Mac Diarmida.

During his racing career, Lunchtime was owned by Colonel R D Poole and was trained at Seven Barrows near Lambourn in Berkshire by Peter Walwyn.

== Racing career ==
=== 1972: two-year-old season ===
On his first racecourse appearance Lunchtime started the 11/10 favourite for the Goldings Maiden Stakes, for previously unraced horses over six furlongs at Goodwood Racecourse in September. He never looked in any danger of defeat, took the lead two furlongs out and won very easily. On his next appearance he ran in the Clarence House Stakes over the same distance at Ascot Racecourse in which he was opposed by the National Stakes winner Hunter's Path. He drew away from his rivals in the final furlong to win by four lengths, with Timeform commenting that the winning margin "could easily have been doubled".

Lunchtime ended his season with a run in Britain's most prestigious two-year-old race, the Dewhurst Stakes over seven furlongs at Newmarket Racecourse in October. Ridden by Pat Eddery he started 11/8 favourite in what appeared to be a sub-standard field. He took the lead a furlong and a half from the finish and won by two and a half lengths from Draw The Line, with Hubris taking third ahead of Father Christmas. Lunchtime entered the winter of 1972 as the ante-post favourite for both the 2000 Guineas and The Derby.

=== 1973: three-year-old season ===
On his first run as a three-your-old, Lunchtime started odd-on favourite for the Greenham Stakes (a trial race for the 2000 Guineas) over seven furlongs at Newbury Racecourse in April. In a major upset, he sustained his first defeat as he was beaten a length into second place by the 16/1 outsider Boldboy with Mon Fils in third place. On 5 May, Lunchtime contested the 175th running of the 2000 Guineas over Newmarket's Rowley Mile course and finished unplaced behind Mon Fils. He was stepped up in distance for the Predominate Stakes over one and a half miles at Goodwood later in May and was equipped with blinkers for the first time. He finished fourth of the nine runners behind Buoy. Plans to run the colt in The Derby were abandoned and he was retired from racing.

== Assessment ==
In the 1972 Free Handicap, a ranking of the best two-year-olds to race in Britain, Lunchtime was assigned a weight of 128 pounds, placing him joint-fourth behind the filly Jacinth and the colts Noble Decree and Ksar. The independent Timeform organisation gave him a rating of 123, ten pounds behind Jacinth and seven pounds behind the French colts Targowice and Simbir. Walwyn believed that Lunchtime was the best two-year-old he had ever trained. In the following year Timeform gave him a rating of 112 and commented that he was "a good horse at his best, but never the top-class one his reputation had him to be".

== Stud record ==
At the end of his racing career, Lunchtime was exported to become a breeding stallion in Australia. His offspring included Snippets who won the AJC Sires Produce Stakes, Oakleigh Plate and The Galaxy before becoming a very successful sire. Lunchtime died in Australia on 11 October 1991.

== Pedigree ==
Pedigree of Lunchtime (GB), chestnut stallion, 1970
Sire Silly Season (USA) 1962	Tom Fool (USA); 1949	Menow	Pharamond
Sire Silly Season (USA) 1962	Tom Fool (USA); 1949	Menow	Alcibiades
Sire Silly Season (USA) 1962	Tom Fool (USA); 1949	Gaga	Bull Dog
Sire Silly Season (USA) 1962	Tom Fool (USA); 1949	Gaga	Alpoise
Sire Silly Season (USA) 1962	Double Deal (GB); 1946	Straight Deal	Solario
Sire Silly Season (USA) 1962	Double Deal (GB); 1946	Straight Deal	Good Deal
Sire Silly Season (USA) 1962	Double Deal (GB); 1946	Nonats	King Salmon
Sire Silly Season (USA) 1962	Double Deal (GB); 1946	Nonats	Whitebait
Dam Great Occasion (GB) 1965	Hornbeam (GB); 1953	Hyperion	Gainsborough
Dam Great Occasion (GB) 1965	Hornbeam (GB); 1953	Hyperion	Selene
Dam Great Occasion (GB) 1965	Hornbeam (GB); 1953	Thicket	Nasrullah
Dam Great Occasion (GB) 1965	Hornbeam (GB); 1953	Thicket	Thorn Wood
Dam Great Occasion (GB) 1965	Golden Wedding (GB); 1959	Sunny Brae	Torbido
Dam Great Occasion (GB) 1965	Golden Wedding (GB); 1959	Sunny Brae	Sun Petal
Dam Great Occasion (GB) 1965	Golden Wedding (GB); 1959	Flighty Falls	Falls of Clyde
Dam Great Occasion (GB) 1965	Golden Wedding (GB); 1959	Flighty Falls	Swarm (Family: 7-f)
