= Tudenham =

Irish-bred Thoroughbred racehorse

- Sire: Tudor Melody
- Grandsire: Tudor Minstrel
- Dam: Heath Rose
- Damsire: Hugh Lupus
- Sex: Stallion
- Foaled: 21 February 1970
- Country: Ireland
- Colour: Brown
- Breeder: Lionel Brook Holliday
- Owner: Lionel Brook Holliday
- Trainer: Denys Smith
- Record: 18: 1-4-0
- Earnings: £15,178

Major wins
- Middle Park Stakes (1972)

Awards
- Timeform rating 118 (1972), 107 (1973), 109 (1974)

Tudenham (21 February 1970 – after 1991) was an Irish-bred, British-trained Thoroughbred racehorse and sire. He showed his best form as a two-year-old in 1972 when he finished second in the Mill Reef Stakes before recording the only win of his career by taking the Group One Middle Park Stakes. He remained in training for two more seasons but failed to win again. He was retired to become a breeding stallion in Japan and had some success as a sire of winners.

== Background ==
Tudenham was a "strong, attractive" bay horse bred by his owner Lionel Brook Holliday at his Cleaboy Stud, near Mullingar in County Westmeath. He was sent into training with Denys Smith at Bishop Auckland in County Durham. Smith was primarily known for his achievements in National Hunt racing, having trained Red Alligator to win the 1968 Grand National. The horse may have been named after Tudenham Park, a ruined country house four miles away from the Cleaboy Stud.

His sire Tudor Melody was the top-rated two-year-old in Britain in 1958 after winning five of his six races and later had some success when campaigned in the United States. He returned to Europe and had considerable success as a breeding stallion, siring Kashmir, Welsh Pageant (Queen Anne Stakes), Tudor Music (July Cup) and Magic Flute (Coronation Stakes).

Tudenham's dam Heath Rose was a high-class racemare who finished third in the Prix Vermeille and fifth in the Prix de l'Arc de Triomphe as a three-year-old in 1967. She was a granddaughter of the British broodmare Netherton Maid who was a full-sister to Neasham Belle and the female-line ancestor of many good winners including Hethersett, Hittite Glory and Harzand .

== Racing career ==
=== 1972: two-year-old season ===
Tudenham began his racing career in the Scarborough Maiden Stakes over five furlongs at York Racecourse in May and finished second to the Mick Easterby-trained Gypo, beaten a head by the winner. After a three-month absence the colt finished sixth on his reappearance before being stepped up in class for the inaugural running of the Mill Reef Stakes at Newbury Racecourse in September. He took the lead from the start, maintained his advantage until well inside the final furlong but was then caught and beaten a head by Mon Fils. The pair finished ten lengths clear of the other two starters.

On his final start of the year he was moved up to Group One class for the Middle Park Stakes over six furlongs at Newmarket Racecourse and started at odds of 4/1. Of his six opponents, Quentilian, Wohurst and Mad Mahdi had won minor races whilst Golden Master, Boldboy and Loyal Manzer were maidens. Timeform described the race as "the worst Middle Park Stakes in our experience". Boldboy set the pace with Tudenham being restrained at the rear of the field before moving up to take the lead a furlong out. He stayed on well and won by one and a half lengths and a short head from Quentilian and Wohurst.

=== 1973: three-year-old season ===
Tudenham made no impact in his first two starts as a three-year-old finishing unplaced in both the European Free Handicap (behind Pitskelly) and the Irish 2000 Guineas (won by Sharp Edge). In the Britannia Stakes at Royal Ascot he produced a much better effort finishing a close fourth to Tudor Rhythm in a twenty-two runner field. He then ran sixth in a handicap race at Beverley Racecourse and then looked outclassed when finishing sixth to Thatch in the Sussex Stakes in August.

=== 1974: four-year-old season ===
As a four-year-old Tudenham competed mainly in handicaps over sprint distance. He failed to win in nine attempts but produced some good efforts in defeat under big weights. His best performance came over seven furlongs at Doncaster Racecourse in September when he was beaten a neck by the gelding Hovis in the Mark Lane Handicap.

== Assessment ==
In the 1972 Free Handicap, a rating of the best two-year-olds to race in Britain, Tudenham was given a rating of 117 pounds, sixteen pounds behind the filly Jacinth and thirteen pounds behind the leading colt Noble Decree. The independent Timeform organisation gave him a rating of 118, fifteen pounds behind Jacinth. He was given Timefform ratings of 107 in 1973 and 109 in 1974.

== Stud record ==
After his retirement from racing Tudenham returned to his birthplace to become a breeding stallion at the Cleaboy Stud at an initial stud fee of £198. After one season in Ireland he was sold and exported to stand in Japan. The best of his offspring being the Japanese graded stakes race winners Kyoei Bowgun (Kobe Shimbun Hai), Tudenham King (Nakayama Kinen, second in the Tenno Sho) and Nihon Pillow Brave (Epsom Cup, Keihan Hai). He had fertility problems in his later stud career and covered his last mares in 1991.

== Pedigree ==
Pedigree of Tudenham (IRE), brown stallion, 1970
Sire Tudor Melody (GB) 1956	Tudor Minstrel (GB); 1944	Owen Tudor	Hyperion
Sire Tudor Melody (GB) 1956	Tudor Minstrel (GB); 1944	Owen Tudor	Mary Tudor
Sire Tudor Melody (GB) 1956	Tudor Minstrel (GB); 1944	Sansonnet	Sansovino
Sire Tudor Melody (GB) 1956	Tudor Minstrel (GB); 1944	Sansonnet	Lady Juror
Sire Tudor Melody (GB) 1956	Matelda (GB); 1947	Dante	Nearco
Sire Tudor Melody (GB) 1956	Matelda (GB); 1947	Dante	Rosy Legend
Sire Tudor Melody (GB) 1956	Matelda (GB); 1947	Fairly Hot	Solario
Sire Tudor Melody (GB) 1956	Matelda (GB); 1947	Fairly Hot	Fair Cop
Dam Heath Rose (GB) 1964	Hugh Lupus (FR); 1952	Djebel	Tourbillon
Dam Heath Rose (GB) 1964	Hugh Lupus (FR); 1952	Djebel	Loika
Dam Heath Rose (GB) 1964	Hugh Lupus (FR); 1952	Sakountala	Goya
Dam Heath Rose (GB) 1964	Hugh Lupus (FR); 1952	Sakountala	Samos
Dam Heath Rose (GB) 1964	Cherished (GB); 1955	Chanteur	Chateau Bouscaut
Dam Heath Rose (GB) 1964	Cherished (GB); 1955	Chanteur	La Diva
Dam Heath Rose (GB) 1964	Cherished (GB); 1955	Netherton Maid	Nearco
Dam Heath Rose (GB) 1964	Cherished (GB); 1955	Netherton Maid	Phase (Family 21-a)

- Tudenham was inbred 4 × 4 to Nearco, meaning that this stallion appears twice in the fourth generation of his pedigree.
