= Sharp Edge (horse) =

Irish-bred Thoroughbred racehorse

- Sire: Silver Shark
- Grandsire: Buisson Ardent
- Dam: Cutle
- Damsire: Saint Crespin
- Sex: Stallion
- Foaled: 3 May 1970
- Country: Ireland
- Colour: Grey
- Breeder: Sir John Jacob Astor
- Owner: Sir John Jacob Astor
- Trainer: Dick Hern
- Record: 10: 5-0-3

Major wins
- New Ham Stakes (1972); Irish 2000 Guineas (1973); Prix Jean Prat (1973)

Awards
- Timeform rating 112+ (1972), 123 (1973)

Sharp Edge (3 May 1970 – 28 December 1989) was an Irish-bred, British-trained Thoroughbred racehorse and sire. Bred and owned by Sir John Jacob Astor and trained by Dick Hern he showed great promise a two-year-old in 1972 when he won his first three races before looking a somewhat unlucky loser when finishing third in the Royal Lodge Stakes. In the following year he improved to become a top-class miler with a marked preference for soft ground. He finished third in the 2000 Guineas and then recorded back-to-back Group One successes in the Irish 2000 Guineas and the Prix Jean Prat. When matched against older horses he was well-beaten when favourite for the Eclipse Stakes before ending his season by finishing third in a strongly-contested edition of the Champion Stakes. After his retirement from racing he stood as a breeding stallion in Europe and Australia and had some success as a sire of winners.

== Background ==
Sharp Edge was a "big, strong" grey colt bred in Ireland by his owner Sir John Jacob "Jakie" Astor (1918–2000). He was from the penultimate European crop of foals sired by Silver Shark, a top-class performer in France, whose wins included the Prix de l'Abbaye and the Prix du Moulin. Silver Shark was subsequently exported to Japan. Cut Above's dam Cutle was descended from Felucca, the foundation mare of Dick Hollingsworth's stud whose other descendants included Bireme, Longboat, Bolas (Irish Oaks), Dash for Cash (Australian Guineas) and Daffodil (AJC Oaks). Cutle who had been acquired by Astor in a "foal swap" with Hollingsworth went on to produce the St Leger winner Cut Above.

Astor sent his colt into training with Dick Hern at West Ilsley in Berkshire.

== Racing career ==
=== 1972: two-year-old season ===
Sharp Edge began his racing career in the Kennett Maiden Stakes over six furlongs at Newbury Racecourse in July and won by one and a half lengths from the Bernard van Cutsem-trained favourite Noble Decree. On his next appearance, the colt won the Home Ales Stakes over the same distance at Nottingham Racecourse but was not particularly impressive as he had to be driven out to prevail by half a length from Prince Gourmet. In the New Ham Stakes at Goodwood Racecourse Sharp Edge won again, beating the Windsor Castle Stakes winner Adams Pet by a length. On his final appearance of the season, Sharp Edge was moved up in class and distance for the Royal Lodge Stakes over one mile at Ascot Racecourse. In a rough and unsatisfactory race, he was repeatedly blocked as he attempted to obtain a clear run before finishing strongly to take third place behind Adios and Noble Decree. The form of the race was subsequently boosted when Noble Decree won the Observer Gold Cup and in the winter of 1972/1973 British bookmakers made Sharp Edge the 8/1 second favourite for the 2000 Guineas.

=== 1973: three-year-old season ===
On his first appearance as a three-year-old contested the Craven Stakes (a major trial for the 2000 Guineas) on firm going at Newmarket Racecourse in April and finished fifth behind My Drifter. He sustained a shoulder injury in the race and was never again asked to run on firm ground. His participation in the 2000 Guineas on 5 May was in doubt until overnight rain softened the track but he produced a very good effort to finish third of the eighteen runners behind Mon Fils and Noble Decree with Thatch in fourth place. In the Irish 2000 Guineas at the Curragh two weeks later Sharp Edge was ridden by Joe Mercer, and started 5/2 joint-favourite alongside Dapper, the Vincent O'Brien-trained winner of both the Tetrarch Stakes and the Gladness Stakes. The other runners included Pitskelly (Tote Free Handicap), Tudenham (Middle Park Stakes), Midsummer Star (2000 Guineas Trial Stakes), Hail the Pirates and Conor Pass. After being restrained towards the rear of the sixteen-runner field, he made rapid progress in the straight, took the lead approaching the final furlong and won by three lengths from Midsummer Star with similar gaps back to Dapper and Klairvimy in third and fourth.

On 3 June, Sharp Edge was sent to France for the Prix Jean Prat over 1800 metres at Chantilly Racecourse and started 3.2/1 third choice behind Verkade (Prix La Force) and Rose Laurel (Critérium de Maisons-Laffitte, Prix Daru). With Mercer again in the saddle, He won easily from the outsiders Black Melody and Some Crack. Although the racecourse judge reported the winning margin as three lengths, photographs of the finish indicated that Sharp Edge won by at least five lengths. The colt bypassed the St James's Palace Stakes at Royal Ascot and was then matched against older horses for the first time. He started favourite but was unable to recover after being badly hampered by Moulton in the straight and faded to finish sixth behind Scottish Rifle.

Sharp Edge was off the course for well over three months before returning for the Champion Stakes over ten furlongs at Newmarket in October. He proved the best of the male runners as he finished third behind Hurry Harriet and Allez France and ahead of Scottish Rifle, Moulton and Mysterious.

== Assessment ==
There was no International Classification of European two-year-olds in 1972: the official handicappers of Britain, Ireland and France published their own ratings of horses which had raced in those countries. In the British Free Handicap Sharp Edge was assigned a weight of 127 pounds, making him the seventh-best juvenile, six pounds behind the filly Jacinth and three pounds behind the top-rated colt Noble Decree. The independent Timeform organisation felt that he had been over-rated by the official handicapper and gave him a rating of 112, twenty-one pounds inferior to Jacinth and eighteen pounds behind the French colts Targowice and Simbir.

In 1973 he was given a rating of 123 by Timeform, thirteen pounds behind Thatch, who was their highest-rated three-year-old colt. In the British handicap, he was rated the seventh-best three-year-old male behind Thatch, Sandford Lad, Rapid River, Morston, Mon Fils and Peleid.

== Stud record ==
At the end of his racing career, Sharp Edge was syndicated at £12,000 a share, giving him a theoretical value of £480,000. He began his stud career at the Sussex Stud, West Grinstead in 1974. He stood in Europe until 1977 when he was exported to Australia where he died on 28 December 1989. The best of his offspring included Rom's Stiletto (VRC Oaks, The Thousand Guineas), Perfect Bliss (The Thousand Guineas) and Dalby Jaguar (Norwegian Triple Crown).

== Pedigree ==
Pedigree of Sharp Edge (IRE) grey stallion 1970
| Sire Silver Shark (GB) 1963 | Buisson Ardent (FR); 1953 | Relic | War Relic |
| Sire Silver Shark (GB) 1963 | Buisson Ardent (FR); 1953 | Relic | Bridal Colors |
| Sire Silver Shark (GB) 1963 | Buisson Ardent (FR); 1953 | Rose O'Lynn | Pherozshah |
| Sire Silver Shark (GB) 1963 | Buisson Ardent (FR); 1953 | Rose O'Lynn | Rocklyn |
| Sire Silver Shark (GB) 1963 | Palsaka (GB); 1954 | Palestine | Fair Trial |
| Sire Silver Shark (GB) 1963 | Palsaka (GB); 1954 | Palestine | Una |
| Sire Silver Shark (GB) 1963 | Palsaka (GB); 1954 | Masaka | Nearco |
| Sire Silver Shark (GB) 1963 | Palsaka (GB); 1954 | Masaka | Majideh |
| Dam Cutle (GB) 1963 | Saint Crespin (GB); 1956 | Aureole | Hyperion |
| Dam Cutle (GB) 1963 | Saint Crespin (GB); 1956 | Aureole | Angelola |
| Dam Cutle (GB) 1963 | Saint Crespin (GB); 1956 | Neocracy | Nearco |
| Dam Cutle (GB) 1963 | Saint Crespin (GB); 1956 | Neocracy | Harina |
| Dam Cutle (GB) 1963 | Cutter (GB); 19455 | Donatello | Blenheim |
| Dam Cutle (GB) 1963 | Cutter (GB); 19455 | Donatello | Delleana |
| Dam Cutle (GB) 1963 | Cutter (GB); 19455 | Felucca | Nearco |
| Dam Cutle (GB) 1963 | Cutter (GB); 19455 | Felucca | Felsetta (Family 11-d) |

- Sharp Edge was inbred 4 × 4 × 4 to Nearco, meaning that this stallion appears three times in the fourth generation of his pedigree.
