= Conor Pass (horse) =

Irish-bred Thoroughbred racehorse

- Sire: Tiepolo
- Grandsire: Tiepoletto
- Dam: Windfield Lily
- Damsire: Hard Tack
- Sex: Stallion
- Foaled: 28 February 1970
- Country: Ireland
- Colour: Brown
- Breeder: Promotion Holdings Corporation
- Owner: Rita Moore
- Trainer: Kevin Prendergast
- Record: 29: 7-10-2

Major wins
- Irish St Leger (1973); Players-Wills Stakes (1974)

Awards
- Timeform rating 115 (1972), 111 (1973), 115 (1974)

Conor Pass (28 February 1970 – after 1988) was an Irish Thoroughbred racehorse and sire. He was a durable and consistent campaigner who ran at least 29 times in his three-year track career. As a juvenile in 1972 he won two minor events and was placed in several good races including the Railway Stakes. In the following year he was tried over a wide variety of distances, winning handicaps over seven furlongs and one mile before recording his biggest win in the Irish St Leger over one and three-quarter miles. He remained in training as a four-year-old and won two races including a Group 2 contest at Leopardstown Racecourse. After his retirement from racing he became a breeding stallion in Poland and had some success as a sire of winners.

== Background ==
Conor Pass was a brown horse bred in Ireland by Promotion Holdings Corporation. As a yearling he was put up for auction and sold for 2,800 guineas. During his racing career he was owned by Rita Moore and trained by Kevin Prendergast. The horse was named after a mountain pass in County Kerry.

He was sired by Tiepolo whose biggest win came in the Prix Herod in 1966. Tiepolo was a representative of the Byerley Turk sire line, unlike more than 95% of modern thoroughbreds, who descend directly from the Darley Arabian. Conor Pass's dam Windfield Lily was a winning sprinter and a descendant of the influential French broodmare Yveline.

== Racing career ==
=== 1972: two-year-old season ===
Conor Pass made a successful racecourse debut in a six furlong maiden race at Leopardstown Racecourse in April and followed up with a win in a minor stakes race over the same distance at Navan Racecourse in June. He failed to win in five subsequent starts but posted some solid performances in defeat, finishing second in the Enniskillen Stakes, Mullion Stakes and Probationers Stakes (to Thatch) and third in the Railway Stakes. In the Irish Free Handicap, a ranking of the best juveniles to race in Ireland in 1972, Conor Pass was assigned a weight of 126 pounds, twelve pounds behind Thatch, making him the seventh best colt. The independent Timeform organisation gave him a rating of 115, making him 15 pounds inferior to their highest-rated juvenile colts Simbir and Targowice and commented in their annual Racehorses of 1982 that he has likely to do better over longer distances.

=== 1973: three-year-old season ===
As a three-year-old Conor Pass was beaten in his first three starts and then looked outpaced when finishing unplaced behind Sharp Edge in the Irish 2000 Guineas at the Curragh in May. Later that month he recorded his first success of the season when he wore blinkers and won a seven furlong handicap at Phoenix Park Racecourse. Another four defeats followed before he won another Phoenix Park handicap, this time over one mile in August. He was then stepped up in class for the Desmond Stakes at the Curragh and produced his best effort up to that time as he finished a close thind behind Hail The Pirates and Hurry Harriet.

Having never previously raced beyond ten furlongs, Conor Pass was moved up sharply in distance to contest the Irish St Leger over one and three quarter miles at the Curragh on 22 September. Ridden by Paul Jarman he was made the 5/1 second favourite behind the British-trained Sunyboy, while the best of the other five runners appeared to be Barclay Joy, Star Appeal and Park Lawn. After turning into the straight in second place, Conor Pass took the lead two furlongs from the finish and held off the sustained challenge of Sunyboy to win by three quarters of a length with a gap of eight lengths back to Star Appeal in third. He was then shipped to the United States to contest the Washington, D.C. International but was injured shortly before the race and did not take part.

For the 1973 season, Timeform gave Conor Pass a rating of 111, making him 19 pounds inferior to their best stayer Parnell and 25 pounds behind Thatch, who was their top-rated three-year-old.

=== 1974: four-year-old season ===
Conor Pass began his third campaign with two defeats but then returned to form in the Group 2 Player-Wills Stakes over ten furlongs at Leopardstown in June, winning by one and a half lengths from the three-year-old filly Silk Buds. He was then sent to England for the Coronation Cup at Epsom Downs Racecourse and finished last of the five runners behind Buoy. In July at Leopardstown he was dropped back in distance for a race over nine furlongs at Leopardstoen, beating Spanish Doubloon by two and a half lengths. He returned to England later that month for the King George VI and Queen Elizabeth Stakes but looked to be "out of his depth" as he finished unplaced behind Dahlia. He was beaten in his last four races that year but did finish runner-up to Richard Grenville in the Blandford Stakes and also ran second under a weight of 145 pounds in a handicap at Leopardstown. He was rated 115 by Timeform at the end of the year.

== Stud record ==
At the end of his racing career Conor Pass was exported to become a breeding stallion in Poland. The best of his offspring were probably Dżudo, winner of the Group 1 Copa de Oro de San Sebastian, Maracana (Polish 1,000 Guineas and Polish Oaks) and Dixieland, a successful racehorse and sire.

== Sire line tree ==
- Conor Pass
  - Dixieland
    - Bachus
    - Solozzo
    - Noredo
    - Cortez
    - Limak
    - Masini
    - San Luis
  - Dżudo

== Pedigree ==
Pedigree of Conor Pass (IRE), brown stallion, 1970
Sire Tiepolo (IRE) 1964	Tiepoletto (FR); 1956	Tornado	Tourbillon
Sire Tiepolo (IRE) 1964	Tiepoletto (FR); 1956	Tornado	Roseola
Sire Tiepolo (IRE) 1964	Tiepoletto (FR); 1956	Scarlet Skies	Blue Skies
Sire Tiepolo (IRE) 1964	Tiepoletto (FR); 1956	Scarlet Skies	Scarlet Quill
Sire Tiepolo (IRE) 1964	Jacine (GB); 1957	Owen Tudor	Hyperion
Sire Tiepolo (IRE) 1964	Jacine (GB); 1957	Owen Tudor	Mary Tudor
Sire Tiepolo (IRE) 1964	Jacine (GB); 1957	Weighbridge	Portlaw
Sire Tiepolo (IRE) 1964	Jacine (GB); 1957	Weighbridge	Golden Way
Dam Windfield Lily (GB) 1962	Hard Tack (GB); 1955	Hard Sauce	Ardan
Dam Windfield Lily (GB) 1962	Hard Tack (GB); 1955	Hard Sauce	Saucy Bella
Dam Windfield Lily (GB) 1962	Hard Tack (GB); 1955	Cowes	Blue Peter
Dam Windfield Lily (GB) 1962	Hard Tack (GB); 1955	Cowes	Lighthearted
Dam Windfield Lily (GB) 1962	Another Marvel (GB); 1954	His Slipper	Stardust
Dam Windfield Lily (GB) 1962	Another Marvel (GB); 1954	His Slipper	Her Slipper
Dam Windfield Lily (GB) 1962	Another Marvel (GB); 1954	Matura	Rhodes Scholar
Dam Windfield Lily (GB) 1962	Another Marvel (GB); 1954	Matura	Isolda (Family:8-c)
