= Boldboy =

Irish-bred Thoroughbred racehorse

- Sire: Bold Lad (IRE)
- Grandsire: Bold Ruler
- Dam: Solar Echo
- Damsire: Solar Slipper
- Sex: Gelding
- Foaled: 1970
- Country: Ireland
- Colour: Bay
- Breeder: Mrs T V Ryan
- Owner: Lady Beaverbrook
- Trainer: Dick Hern
- Record: 47:14-10-9
- Earnings: £131,073

Major wins
- Greenham Stakes (1973); Prix de la Porte Maillot (1973); Diadem Stakes (1973); Challenge Stakes (1973, 1977); Abernant Stakes (1974, 1976, 1977, 1978); Lockinge Stakes (1974); Sanyo Stakes (1976, 1977); Duke of York Stakes (1977); Vernons Sprint Cup (1977)

Awards
- Timeform rating 126 (1973), 125 (1974), 122 (1975), 126 (1976), 126 (1977), 124 (1978), 112 (1979)

Boldboy (1970 – September 1998) was an Irish-bred, British-trained Thoroughbred racehorse. He raced for eight seasons in the 1970s and was one of the most popular and successful racehorses of his era. As a two-year-old he showed ability, but his ungovernable temperament led to him being gelded. In the following year he won the Greenham Stakes, Prix de la Porte Maillot, Diadem Stakes and Challenge Stakes. In 1974 he won the Lockinge Stakes and recorded the first of his four wins in the Abernant Stakes. After failing to win in 1975 he returned to form in 1976 to win the Abernant Stakes and the Sanyo Stakes. He reached his peak in 1977, when he repeated his previous wins in the Abernant Stakes, Sanyo Stakes and Challenge Stakes as well as taking the Vernons Sprint Cup. He won a fourth Abernant Stakes in 1978 and was retired in the following year. Apart from his wins he was placed in many important races but, as a gelding, was unable to compete in European Group One events under the rules which prevailed at the time.

== Background ==
Boldboy was a bay gelding with a white star bred in Ireland by Mrs T V Ryan. He was one of the second crop of foals sired by Bold Lad (IRE) (not to be confused with the American horse Bold Lad), the leading European two-year-old of 1966. Bold Lad (IRE) was a successful breeding stallion, siring Waterloo and Never So Bold as well as being the grandsire of Chief Singer and Kooyonga. Boldboy's dam, Solar Echo, won only one minor race but was descended from Singapore's Sister, a sister of the St Leger winner Singapore.

As a yearling, he was offered for sale at Goffs sale and bought for 13,000 guineas by representatives of Lady Beaverbrook. His new owner was considered an eccentric character who gave most of her horses names consisting of one word with seven letters (for example Bustino, Terimon, Niniski, Mystiko, Petoski), as this was the most common form for Derby winners. Boldboy was sent into training with Dick Hern at West Ilsley in Berkshire.

== Racing career ==
=== 1972: two-year-old season ===
Boldboy showed promise as a two-year-old but also showed serious temperamental problems. Hern said that he was a "very, very difficult" horse to train. On his racecourse debut, ridden by Lester Piggott, he started poorly before finishing fourth to Sandford Lad in the Errol Stakes at Ascot Racecourse. The race was run at the "Heath" meeting on the Saturday after Royal Ascot. In his next scheduled race at Newbury he behaved so badly that he was withdrawn at the start. Despite his uncooperative attitude, he was moved up in class for the Group One Middle Park Stakes at Newmarket Racecourse and, ridden by stable work-rider Brian Proctor, finished fourth behind Tudenham. In the winter of 1972/3, the colt was gelded, rendering him more tractable, but ineligible for many of the most important European races.

=== 1973: three-year-old season ===
Although he could not contest the 2000 Guineas itself, Boldboy began his second season in April in the Greenham Stakes, one of the major trials for the Newmarket classic. Ridden by Joe Mercer he started a 16/1 outsider but won by length from the undefeated Dewhurst Stakes winner Lunchtime, who had been the ante-post favourite for the Guineas. Mon Fils, who finished a length behind Lunchtime in third went on to boost the form by recording a 50/1 upset win in the 2000 Guineas. Later that month Boldboy was moved up in distance for the Blue Riband Trial Stakes over eight and a half furlongs at Epsom and finished second to Gospill Hill when carrying seven pounds more than the winner. The gelding was then sent to France for the Prix de la Porte Maillot over 1400 metres at Longchamp Racecourse in June. He started at odds of 7.9/1, took the lead on the turn into the straight and won by three lengths from the Italian-trained Brook. Boldboy returned to France for the Group One Prix Jacques Le Marois at Deauville Racecourse in August and finished fourth behind Kalamoun, Rose Laurel and Sparkler, three and a half lengths behind the winner. In autumn, Boldboy raced in England again and was brought back in distance to compete over sprint distances. In the Diadem Stakes over six furlongs at Ascot he led from the start and won by half a length from the Cork and Orrery Stakes winner Balliol, before going on to win the Challenge Stakes over the same distance at Newmarket at odds of 8/13.

=== 1974: four-year-old season ===
Boldboy began his third season in the six furlong Abernant Stakes at Newmarket in April and led from the start and won by four lengths from the three-year-old Cawdor, to whom he was conceding twenty-four pounds. He was then moved up in trip for the one mile Lockinge Stakes (then a Group Two race open to horses aged three and over) at Newbury. Starting at odds of 15/8, the gelding was restrained by Mercer in the early stages, before overtaking Owen Dudley two furlongs out and holding off the challenge of the French-trained four-year-old El Rastro to win by a length (surviving a lengthy Stewards Enquiry). Boldboy failed to win in his four subsequent races that year but produced some good efforts in defeat. He finished fourth to El Rastro when attempting to repeat his 1973 success in the Prix de la Porte Maillot, fourth behind Saritamer on firm ground in the July Cup and second, four lengths behind the French colt Liloy in the Prix Quincey at Deauville in August. Boldboy ended his season the Diadem Stakes, finishing third behind Saritamer and New Model.

=== 1975: five-year-old season ===
Boldboy had his least successful season as a five-year-old in 1975 when he failed to win in seven races. His best efforts came when finishing fourth in the Prix de la Porte Maillot, second to Son of Silver in Prix Messidor and third to Imperial March in the Queen Anne Stakes (then a Group Three race open to three-year-olds and up) at Royal Ascot. During this season, Boldboy began to race in blinkers.

=== 1976: six-year-old season ===
On his debut as a six-year-old, Boldboy recorded his first success in over a year when he won the Abernant Stakes for a second time, beating Honeyblest by a head after leading from the start. He ran poorly when unplaced in the Lockinge Stakes but then finished third behind Ardoon and Record Token in the Queen Anne Stakes and fourth, beaten less than half a length in a blanket finish for the Prix de la Porte Maillot. The gelding was then dropped into handicap company for the Joe Coral Handicap at Haydock Park and finished second to Berkeley Square, to whom he was conceding thirteen pounds. He produced one of his best performances in defeat in the Waterford Crystal Mile at Goodwood in August, when he was beaten a short head by Free State, carrying nineteen pound more than the runner-up. Two weeks later, Boldboy, again conceding weight to his opponents, won the Sanyo Stakes over seven furlongs at Doncaster Racecourse and won by a length and a half from the four-year-old filly Be Tuneful. In his last two starts he finished fourth to Honeyblest in the Diadem Stakes and third to Star Bird and Be Tuneful in the Challenge Stakes.

During his 1976 campaign, Boldboy broke the record for earnings by a British-trained gelding, surpassing the mark set by the stayer Petty Officer who had been retired a year earlier. He held the record until Bedtime finished runner-up in the 1984 Japan Cup.

=== 1977: seven-year-old season ===
Boldboy (now racing without blinkers) had his most successful season as a seven-year-old in 1977, with Willie Carson taking over as his regular jockey. He began with a third win in the Abernant Stakes and then finished second by a head when attempting to concede nine pounds to the four-year-old colt Duke Ellington in the Victoria Cup at Kempton. In May he returned to sprinting for the Duke of York Stakes over six furlongs at York Racecourse. He started at odds of 7/1 and won easily by three lengths from the four-year-old colt Future Forest. He finished unplaced for the only time that year when a close sixth behind the Greenham Stakes winner He Loves Me in the Cork and Orrery Stakes in June and then finished third behind the same colt in the Hungerford Stakes at Newbury in August.

Boldboy won his three remaining races in 1977. In September, he won the Sanyo Stakes for a second time, beating the Jersey Stakes winner Gwent by five lengths with the 1000 Guineas winner Mrs McArdy a length and a half away in third. He had to work harder to win the Challenge Stakes for the second time at odds of 11/8 beating Creetown by three quarters of a length. He ended his season by recording his most important win to date with a "most impressive and decisive" two and a half length victory over Hillandale when even money favourite the Vernons Sprint Cup.

=== 1978: eight-year-old season ===
Boldboy began his 1978 campaign by winning the Abernant Stakes for the fourth time, beating Ubedizzy by two lengths, but failed to win again. He finished third behind Private Line in the Duke of York Stakes and was then off the course for three months before running third to Tannenberg and Skyliner in the Hungerford Stakes. In the Kiveton Park Steel Stakes at Doncaster he was beaten three quarters of a length by the filly Green Girl, to whom he was conceding twenty-three pounds. On his final appearance of the year his temperamental problems resurfaced as he misbehaved at the start before finishing fifth in the Vernons Sprint Cup.

=== 1979: nine-year-old season ===
Boldboy made only two appearances in his final season. In April he attempted to win the Abernant Stakes for the fifth time, but finished second, four lengths behind the four-year-old Vaigly Great. In the following month he finished third behind Formidable and Roland Gardens in the Cold Shield Windows Trophy over one mile at Haydock.

== Retirement ==
Boldboy was retired from racing in 1979. Lady Beaverbrook ensured that the horse had a happy and comfortable retirement, "both in her lifetime and in the terms of her will". He lived at the Warren Stud at Newmarket, where his stall, specially designed by his owner, was adorned with the record of the races he won. He shared a paddock with Totowah, the winner of the 1978 Ebor Handicap. Boldboy enjoyed excellent health before a sudden deterioration in September 1998 led to his being euthanised at the age of twenty-eight.

== Assessment ==
There was no International Classification of European three-year-olds in 1973: the official handicappers of Britain, Ireland and France published their own ratings of horses which had raced in those countries. In the British handicap, Boldboy was rated the tenth-best three-year-old of the season, eight pounds behind the French-trained filly Dahlia. The independent Timeform organisation rated him on 126, ten pounds behind their top-rated three-year-old Thatch but ahead of Mon Fils, Morston and Peleid, the colts who won the three races of the Triple Crown. In the 1974 British handicap, he was rated the ninth-best older horse, eleven pounds below Dahlia. Timeform gave him a rating of 125 and described him as "one of Europe's top performers at six furlongs to a mile". In 1975 Timeform rated him at 122 and commented that he was "not quite the force he was". In 1976, was among the twenty best older horses to race in Britain, being rated thirteen pounds behind the top-rated Sagaro in the official handicap. Timeform commented that the gelding appeared to have "found a new lease of life" and gave him a rating of 126. Boldboy repeated his 126 Timeform rating in 1977 and was described in their annual Racehorses of 1977 as "a genuine, most consistent animal, and admirable in every way". His Timeform rating fell to 124 in the following year, although the organisation described him as "a grand veteran" and "a really enthusiastic galloper who races with tremendous determination". He was rated 112 by Timeform in his abbreviated final season.

In their book, A Century of Champions, based on the Timeform rating system, John Randall and Tony Morris described Boldboy as "one of the best– and best-loved– geldings ever to race on the Flat".

Dick Hern said that Boldboy was "a wonderfully versatile horse, top class over six furlongs and a mile, a very good doer, and one of the soundest who ever came my way. I never remember his being lame in all the time I had him".

== Pedigree ==
Pedigree of Boldboy (IRE), bay gelding, 1970
Sire Bold Lad (IRE) (IRE) 1964	Bold Ruler (USA); 1954	Nasrullah	Nearco
Sire Bold Lad (IRE) (IRE) 1964	Bold Ruler (USA); 1954	Nasrullah	Mumtaz Begum
Sire Bold Lad (IRE) (IRE) 1964	Bold Ruler (USA); 1954	Miss Disco	Discovery
Sire Bold Lad (IRE) (IRE) 1964	Bold Ruler (USA); 1954	Miss Disco	Outdone
Sire Bold Lad (IRE) (IRE) 1964	Barn Pride (GB); 1957	Democratic	Denturius
Sire Bold Lad (IRE) (IRE) 1964	Barn Pride (GB); 1957	Democratic	Light Fantasy
Sire Bold Lad (IRE) (IRE) 1964	Barn Pride (GB); 1957	Fair Alycia	Alycidon
Sire Bold Lad (IRE) (IRE) 1964	Barn Pride (GB); 1957	Fair Alycia	Fair Edwine
Dam Solar Echo (GB) 1957	Solar Slipper (GB); 1945	Windsor Slipper	Windsor Lad
Dam Solar Echo (GB) 1957	Solar Slipper (GB); 1945	Windsor Slipper	Carpet Slipper
Dam Solar Echo (GB) 1957	Solar Slipper (GB); 1945	Solar Flower	Solario
Dam Solar Echo (GB) 1957	Solar Slipper (GB); 1945	Solar Flower	Serena
Dam Solar Echo (GB) 1957	Eastern Echo (GB); 1938	Colombo	Manna
Dam Solar Echo (GB) 1957	Eastern Echo (GB); 1938	Colombo	Lady Nairn
Dam Solar Echo (GB) 1957	Eastern Echo (GB); 1938	Singapore's Sister	Gainsborough
Dam Solar Echo (GB) 1957	Eastern Echo (GB); 1938	Singapore's Sister	Tetrabbazia (Family: 8-c)
