= Lunchtime (disambiguation) =

Lunchtime is around midday, when a meal is eaten.

Lunchtime may also refer to:

- Lunchtime (horse) (1970–1991), British Thoroughbred racehorse and sire
- "Lunchtime", a 2021 song by Spacey Jane
