= Bellypha =

Irish-bred Thoroughbred racehorse

- Sire: Lyphard
- Grandsire: Northern Dancer
- Dam: Belga
- Damsire: Le Fabuleux
- Sex: Stallion
- Foaled: 28 February 1976
- Country: Ireland
- Colour: Grey
- Breeder: Societe Aland
- Owner: Jacques Wertheimer
- Trainer: Alec Head
- Record: 11:6-2-0

Major wins
- Prix Thomas Bryon (1978); Prix de La Jonchere (1979); Prix Daphnis (1979); Prix Quincey (1979)

Awards
- Timeform rating 124+ (1978), 130 (1979)

Bellypha (28 February 1976 – 12 August 2002) was an Irish-bred, French-trained Thoroughbred racehorse and sire. Despite never winning a Group One race, Bellypha was one of the highest-rated racehorses of his generation in Europe at both two and three years of age. In eleven racecourse appearances, Bellypha won six races including the Prix Thomas Bryon, Prix de La Jonchere, Prix Daphnis and Prix Quincey, but produced his best effort in defeat when narrowly beaten by Irish River in the Prix Jacques Le Marois. He later became a successful breeding stallion in France and Japan.

== Background ==
Bellypha was a grey horse bred in Ireland by the Head family's Societe Aland breeding organisation. During his racing career Bellypha was a dark grey with a lighter face: like all greys his coat lightened as he aged and later appeared almost completely white. He was from the third crop of foals sired by Lyphard, an American-bred, French-trained horse who won the Prix Jacques Le Marois in 1972. At stud, Lyphard was very successful, siring champions such as Three Troikas, Dancing Brave and Manila. Bellypha was the third, and best foal of his dam Belga, a moderate racehorse, but a descendant of the broodmare Malcolmia, making her a distant relative of the Coronation Cup winner Oncidium.

As a yearling, Bellypha was sold for 410,000 francs (approximately £48,000) and entered the ownership of Jacques Wertheimer. The colt's breeders retained some control over his career, as he was trained by Alec Head at Chantilly.

== Racing career ==
=== 1978: two-year-old season ===
After finishing fourth on his racecourse debut Bellypha recorded his first success at Deauville Racecourse in August when he won a maiden race over 1400 metres. He then won a minor race over the same distance at Longchamp Racecourse. On 10 October, Bellypha was moved up in class to contest the Group Three Prix Eclipse over 1300m at Saint-Cloud Racecourse. He started the 5/2 second favourite in a field of ten runners, but finished fourth, three and a half lengths behind the Aga Khan's colt Ramanouche. On 4 November Bellypha started at odds of 9.6/1 for the Group Three Prix Thomas Bryon over 1500m at Saint-Cloud. He produced his best performance of the year, taking the lead early in the straight and drawing away in the closing stages to win by four lengths from the François Boutin-trained Sharpman, with the filly Water Lily half a length away in third.

=== 1979: three-year-old season ===
Bellypha was regarded as a potentially top-class middle distance performer and made his first appearance as a three-year-old in the Prix de Guiche over 1950m on soft ground at Longchamp on 16 April. He produced a strong late run but failed by half a length to catch the favourite Top Ville. He was brought back in distance for the 1600m Prix de La Jonchere, a Group Three race at the same course on 10 May. Starting the 3/10 favourite against seven opponents he won easily by four lengths from Maraway.

Despite doubts about his stamina, Bellypha was given another chance to prove himself over middle distances on 3 June when he started the 8/1 third favourite for the Group One Prix du Jockey Club over 2400m at Chantilly. Freddy Head moved the colt into a challenging position in the straight but could make no further progress, finishing fourth behind Top Ville, Le Marmot and Sharpman. Jackie Taillard took over from Head when Bellypha reappeared in the Prix Daphnis over 1800m at Evry Racecourse at the end of the month. The colt started at odds of 1/5 against moderate opposition and won by four lengths.

While Top Ville and Le Marmot appeared the best of their generation in France over middle distances, the leading miler was Irish River, who had won eight of his ten races including five at Group One level. Bellypha met Irish River for the first and only time in the weight-for-age Prix Jacques Le Marois on 12 August at Deauville Racecourse. The two colts dominated the closing stages, drawing away from the other runners before Irish River prevailed by a neck. Head lodged an objection to the winner for causing interference but the racecourse stewards allowed the result to remain unchanged. Thirteen days after his defeat in the Marois, Bellypha started 1/2 favourite for the 1600m Prix Quincey in which his main rivals appeared to be the British runners Camden Town (Jersey Stakes) and Topsy (Prix d'Astarte). Head tracked the pacemaker River Bank before accelerating 300m from the finish and won easily by two and a half lengths from Topsy.

== Assessment ==
In 1978, Bellypha was given a rating of 124+ by the independent Timeform organisation, the "+" indicating that the horse might be rather better than the rating suggested. In the inaugural International Classification, a collaboration between the official handicappers of France, Ireland and the United Kingdom, Bellypha was rated the seventh-best two-year-old colt in Europe, seven pounds behind Tromos. In the following year the colt was rated 130 by Timeform, one pound behind Irish River and seven behind the top-rated Troy. In the International Classification he was rated the sixth-best three-year-old colt in Europe and the tenth-best horse of any age.

== Stud record ==
Bellypha was retired from racing to become a breeding stallion at Alec Head's Haras du Quesnay stud. He was exported in 1989 to Japan where his last foals were born in 2000. He was "put out of stud" in Japan on 15 September 2001.

Bellypha's major winners included:

- Boreale, 1981, Prix des Réservoirs
- Mendez, 1981, Prix du Moulin, Prix Jean Prat, Prix des Chênes, Prix de Fontainebleau
- Bella Colora, 1982, Prix de l'Opéra, Waterford Candelabra Stakes, Lupe Stakes
- Silvermine, 1982, Poule d'Essai des Pouliches
- Daloma, 1984, A Gleam Handicap, Monrovia Handicap
- Lady Bentley, 1984, Oaks d'Italia
- Malaspina, 1984, Prix Perth
- Val des Bois, 1986, El Rincon Handicap, Prix La Force, Prix Edmond Blanc, Prix du Muguet, Prix de Guiche
- Osumi Point, 1990, Keisei Hai
- Makiba Silent, 1992, Queen Sho
- Hoshu Saloon, 1993, Zen-Nippon Nisai Yushun

== Pedigree ==
Pedigree of Bellypha, grey stallion, 1976
Sire Lyphard (USA) 1969	Northern Dancer (CAN); 1961	Nearctic	Nearco
Sire Lyphard (USA) 1969	Northern Dancer (CAN); 1961	Nearctic	Lady Angela
Sire Lyphard (USA) 1969	Northern Dancer (CAN); 1961	Natalma	Native Dancer
Sire Lyphard (USA) 1969	Northern Dancer (CAN); 1961	Natalma	Almahmoud
Sire Lyphard (USA) 1969	Goofed (USA); 1960	Court Martial	Fair Trial
Sire Lyphard (USA) 1969	Goofed (USA); 1960	Court Martial	Instantaneous
Sire Lyphard (USA) 1969	Goofed (USA); 1960	Barra	Formor
Sire Lyphard (USA) 1969	Goofed (USA); 1960	Barra	La Favorite
Dam Belga (FR) 1968	Le Fabuleux (FR); 1961	Wild Risk	Rialto
Dam Belga (FR) 1968	Le Fabuleux (FR); 1961	Wild Risk	Wild Violet
Dam Belga (FR) 1968	Le Fabuleux (FR); 1961	Anguar	Verso
Dam Belga (FR) 1968	Le Fabuleux (FR); 1961	Anguar	La Rochelle
Dam Belga (FR) 1968	Belle de Retz (IRE); 1962	Gilles de Retz	Royal Charger
Dam Belga (FR) 1968	Belle de Retz (IRE); 1962	Gilles de Retz	Ma Soeur Anne
Dam Belga (FR) 1968	Belle de Retz (IRE); 1962	Abracadabra	Abernant
Dam Belga (FR) 1968	Belle de Retz (IRE); 1962	Abracadabra	Malcomia (Family 16-b)
