= Northern Taste =

Canadian-bred Thoroughbred racehorse

Northern Taste ノーザンテースト
- Northern Taste at Shadai Farm.
- Breed: Thoroughbred
- Sire: Northern Dancer
- Grandsire: Nearctic
- Dam: Lady Victoria
- Damsire: Victoria Park}
- Sex: Stallion
- Foaled: March 15, 1971
- Died: December 11, 2004 (aged 33)
- Country: Canada
- Colour: Chestnut
- Breeder: E. P. Taylor
- Owner: Zenya Yoshida
- Racing colours
- Trainer: John Cunnington Jr.
- Record: 20: 5-2-3
- Earnings: F 738,125 & £1,743

Major wins
- Prix Thomas Bryon (1973); Prix Eclipse (1973); Prix Djebel (1974); Prix de la Forêt (1974); Prix du Pin (1975)

Awards
- Leading sire in Japan (1982–1983, 1985–1992); Leading broodmare sire in Japan (1990–2006)

Northern Taste (Japanese: ノーザンテースト, Hepburn: Noozan Teesuto; March 15, 1971 – December 11, 2004) was a Canadian-bred Thoroughbred racehorse who raced in France before being exported to Japan and becoming one of the most successful and influential leading sires in Japanese racing history.

== Background ==
Bred by E. P. Taylor at his Windfields Farm in Oshawa, Ontario, Northern Taste was out of the mare Lady Victoria, a daughter of Canadian Hall of Fame inductee, Victoria Park. His sire was the Canadian and U.S. Racing Hall of Fame star, Northern Dancer, whom the NTRA calls "one of the most influential sires in Thoroughbred history."

Northern Taste was part of Windfields Farm's 1972 consignment of yearlings at the annual Saratoga yearling sale. He was purchased for US$100,000 by Teruya Yoshida for his father Zenya Yoshida, a Japanese racehorse owner/breeder who operated Shadai Farm in Shiraoi, Hokkaido. His new owner decided to race the colt in France and turned him over to trainer John Cunnington, Jr. at the Great Stables in Chantilly.

== Racing career ==
Racing at age two, Northern Taste won the Prix Thomas Bryon at Saint-Cloud Racecourse and the Prix Eclipse at Maisons-Laffitte Racecourse where the following April 1974 he would return to win the Prix Djebel. Sent to compete in the 1974 English Classics, Northern Taste finished fourth in the 2,000 Guineas and fifth in The Derby. Back in France, he ran third in the Prix Eugène Adam and in September finished second in the Group I Prix du Moulin de Longchamp at Longchamp Racecourse before winning the G1 Prix de la Forêt in October. He returned to the track in 1975 at age four, winning the Group III Prix du Pin in the Fall at Longchamp.

== Stud record ==
Retired from racing, Northern Taste was brought to Japan to stand at stud at his owner's breeding farm. His owner described him as a calm and healthy horse who rarely caught a cold or suffered from any of the intestinal problems common to Thoroughbreds.

Northern Taste became one of the most important stallions in the history of Japanese horse breeding, especially in the late 1980s to early 1990s. His success as a stallion made the Yoshida family breeding business into the largest and most successful in the history of Japan with the largest number of broodmares of any breeder in the world. Northern Taste set a record for having sired the most race winners in Japan Racing Association history with 1,754 (later beaten by Sunday Silence), and he substantially influenced the quality of the Japanese industry's bloodstock. He was the leading sire in Japan for ten of the eleven years between 1982 and 1992 and also headed the broodmare sires list a number of times. His offspring proved successful at both medium and longer distances and were winners of 92 graded stakes races. Among his progeny were Amber Shadai, winner of the 1983 Autumn Tenno Sho; Dyna Carle, who won the 1983 Yushun Himba (Japanese Oaks); 1986 Tokyo Yushun champion Dyna Gulliver; plus Champion Older Mare Dyna Actress and the 1990 Champion 2-year-old filly of Japan, Northern Driver.

The last sire of Northern Taste's progeny in Japan was retired in 2010. However, the broodmares' line was active.

Northern Taste was retired from stud duty in 1999 and died at the age of 33 on December 11, 2004. His owners acquired Kentucky Derby, Preakness Stakes, and Breeders' Cup Classic winner Sunday Silence to carry on for Northern Taste, and he too topped Japan's sire list from 1995 through 2005. In 1980, Zenya Yoshida purchased Real Shadai, who became the leading sire in Japan in 1993. In the 1990s, the Yoshida family also purchased the Italian star and Prix de l'Arc de Triomphe winner Tony Bin for US$4 million and Epsom Derby winner Dr. Devious for US$6 million. In September 2002, they paid US$17.7 million for the stallion War Emblem. Teruya Yoshida told a journalist that the success of Northern Taste "bought all the stallions we have."

== Pedigree ==
Pedigree of Northern Taste, chestnut stallion, 1971
Sire Northern Dancer	Nearctic	Nearco	Pharos
Sire Northern Dancer	Nearctic	Nearco	Nogara
Sire Northern Dancer	Nearctic	Lady Angela	Hyperion
Sire Northern Dancer	Nearctic	Lady Angela	Sister Sarah
Sire Northern Dancer	Natalma	Native Dancer	Polynesian
Sire Northern Dancer	Natalma	Native Dancer	Geisha
Sire Northern Dancer	Natalma	Almahmoud	Mahmoud
Sire Northern Dancer	Natalma	Almahmoud	Arbitrator
Dam Lady Victoria	Victoria Park	Chop Chop	Flares
Dam Lady Victoria	Victoria Park	Chop Chop	Sceptical
Dam Lady Victoria	Victoria Park	Victoriana	Windfields
Dam Lady Victoria	Victoria Park	Victoriana	Iribelle
Dam Lady Victoria	Lady Angela	Hyperion	Gainsborough
Dam Lady Victoria	Lady Angela	Hyperion	Selene
Dam Lady Victoria	Lady Angela	Sister Sarah	Abbot's Trace
Dam Lady Victoria	Lady Angela	Sister Sarah	Sarita (family: 14-c)
