= Noble Decree =

American-bred Thoroughbred racehorse

- Sire: Vaguely Noble
- Grandsire: Vienna
- Dam: Hidden Secret
- Damsire: Promulgation
- Sex: Stallion
- Foaled: 6 March 1970
- Country: United States
- Colour: Bay
- Breeder: Kinsman Stud Farms
- Owner: Nelson Bunker Hunt
- Trainer: Bernard van Cutsem
- Record: 9: 3-3-0

Major wins
- Observer Gold Cup (1972)

Awards
- Top-rated British 2-y-o colt (1972); Timeform rating 127 (1972), 124 (1973)

Noble Decree (foaled 6 March 1970) was an American-bred British-trained Thoroughbred racehorse and sire. As a two-year-old colt he won two of his first five races before ending his season with a win in the Observer Gold Cup. He was rated the best colt of his generation in the 1972 Free Handicap. In the following year he was narrowly beaten by Mon Fils in the 2000 Guineas before suffering a career-ending injury in The Derby. He had no success as a breeding stallion.

== Background ==
Noble Decree was a "strong, shapely, most attractive" bay horse with a very small white star bred in Florida by Kinsman Stud Farms. He was sold twice at auction in the United States, fetching $75,000 as a foal in 1970 and $145,000 as a yearling in the following year. On the latter occasion he was bought by representatives of the Texan oil billionaire Nelson Bunker Hunt who sent the horse to be trained in Europe. The colt was sent into training with Bernard Van Cutsem at his Stanley House stable at Newmarket, Suffolk. At the time, Van Cutsem was one of the most successful trainers in Britain, handling major winners including Park Top and Karabas (Washington, D.C. International Stakes).

Noble Decree's sire, Vaguely Noble, won the Prix de l'Arc de Triomphe in 1968 before becoming a successful breeding stallion whose best progeny included Dahlia, Exceller and Empery His dam Hidden Secret was a stakes winner and half-sister of the Hollywood Derby winner Terry's Secret. Her dam Secret Session was also the female-line ancestor of the Kentucky Derby winner Strike the Gold.

== Racing career ==
=== 1972: two-year-old season ===
After finishing unplaced over five furlongs at Kempton Park Racecourse in May Noble Decree started favourite for the Kennet Stakes over six furlongs in June but was beaten half a length by Sharp Edge, a colt who went on to win the Irish 2000 Guineas. Later that month he was stepped up to seven furlongs and won a maiden race at Newmarket Racecourse and won by a length from Starred. In July he started odds-on favourite for the Exeter Stakes over the same course and distance and won by three lengths from the filly Exmoor Lass. The colt was then moved up in class and distance for the Royal Lodge Stakes over one mile at Ascot Racecourse. In a rough and unsatisfactory race, he finished second, beaten half a length by the Noel Murless-trained Adios, with Sharp Edge in third.

On his final appearance of the season, Noble Decree contested the Group One Observer Gold Cup (now the Racing Post Trophy) at Doncaster in October in which he started at odds of 8/1 in a ten-runner field. The French challenger Kalamoun started favourite ahead of Duke of Ragusa (winner of the Solario Stakes), whilst the other runners included Mon Fils, Stanleyville (Prix des Chênes), Kwang Su (third in the National Stakes), Pince Chad (second in the Gimcrack Stakes) and Van Cutsem's other runner Ksar and impressive winner of a maiden at Newmarket. With the stable jockey Willie Carson opting to partner Ksar, the ride on Noble Decree went to Lester Piggott. After being restrained towards the rear of the field as the outsider Hurry Round set the pace, Noble Decree began to make rapid progress on the outside in the last quarter mile. He overtook his stablemate Ksar inside the final furlong and won by half a length despite hanging left towards the rail in the closing stages. Stanleyville took third place ahead of Kalamoun.

=== 1973: three-year-old season ===
On his three-year-old debut Noble Decree ran in the Ladbroke Classic Trial over seven furlongs at Kempton and appeared unsuited by the course and distance as he finished fourth against moderate opposition. His next race was the 175th running of the 2000 Guineas over the Rowley Mile at Newmmarket on 5 May. Apparently relishing the soft ground he briefly took the lead in the final furlong before being overtaken in the final strides and beaten a head by the 50/1 outsider Mon Fils. Sharp Edge finished third ahead of Thatch. The race established Noble Decree as a major contender for The Derby.

With Carson again choosing Ksar (who had won the Sandown Classic Trial and the Lingfield Derby Trial) and Lester Piggott opting to partner Cavo Doro (a horse he had bred himself), the ride on Noble Decree in the Derby went to Brian Taylor. He was strongly fancied for the race, which was run on very firm ground, but after running well he dropped away quickly in the straight and finished unplaced behind Morston. He was found to have sustained a serious back injury which ended his racing career.

== Assessment ==
In the 1972 Free Handicap a ranking of that season's best British two-year-olds Noble Decree was assigned a weight of 132 pounds, making him the highest-rated colt of his generation: he was however, rated a three pounds inferior to the filly Jacinth. The independent Timeform organisation rated him on 127, two pounds behind their best British two-year-old colt The Go-Between, three pounds behind the French colts Targowice and Simbir, and six pounds inferior to Jacinth. In their annual "Racehorses of 1972" Timeform opined that he was "bound to win good races" but was not a "ready-made classic winner" and stated that two-year-old colts of 1972 seemed to be "a moderate lot". In 1973 he was rated 124 by Timeform, twelve pounds inferior to their top-rated three-year-old Thatch.

== Stud record ==
After beginning his stud career in at the Gainesway Farm in Kentucky, Noble Decree was exported to Australia in 1977. He had very little success as a sire of winners in either location.

== Pedigree ==
Pedigree of Noble Decree (USA), bay stallion, 1970
| Sire Vaguely Noble (IRE) 1965 | Vienna (GB); 1957 | Aureole | Hyperion* |
| Sire Vaguely Noble (IRE) 1965 | Vienna (GB); 1957 | Aureole | Angelola* |
| Sire Vaguely Noble (IRE) 1965 | Vienna (GB); 1957 | Turkish Blood | Turkhan |
| Sire Vaguely Noble (IRE) 1965 | Vienna (GB); 1957 | Turkish Blood | Rusk |
| Sire Vaguely Noble (IRE) 1965 | Noble Lassie (GB); 1956 | Nearco | Pharos |
| Sire Vaguely Noble (IRE) 1965 | Noble Lassie (GB); 1956 | Nearco | Nogara |
| Sire Vaguely Noble (IRE) 1965 | Noble Lassie (GB); 1956 | Belle Sauvage | Big Game |
| Sire Vaguely Noble (IRE) 1965 | Noble Lassie (GB); 1956 | Belle Sauvage | Tropical Sun* |
| Dam Hidden Secret (USA) 1963 | Promulgation (GB); 1955 | Court Martial | Fair Trial |
| Dam Hidden Secret (USA) 1963 | Promulgation (GB); 1955 | Court Martial | Instantaneous |
| Dam Hidden Secret (USA) 1963 | Promulgation (GB); 1955 | Picture Play | Donatello* |
| Dam Hidden Secret (USA) 1963 | Promulgation (GB); 1955 | Picture Play | Amuse |
| Dam Hidden Secret (USA) 1963 | Secret Session (USA); 1954 | Your Host | Alibhai* |
| Dam Hidden Secret (USA) 1963 | Secret Session (USA); 1954 | Your Host | Boudoir |
| Dam Hidden Secret (USA) 1963 | Secret Session (USA); 1954 | Bravely Go | Challenger |
| Dam Hidden Secret (USA) 1963 | Secret Session (USA); 1954 | Bravely Go | Chessel (Family: 16-c) |

* Ace of Aces is inbred 4S x 5S x 5D to the stallion Hyperion, meaning that he appears fourth generation and fifth generation (via Tropical Sun) on the sire side of his pedigree, and fifth generation (via Alibhai) on the dam side of his pedigree.

* Ace of Aces is inbred 5S x 4D to the stallion Donatello, meaning that he appears fifth generation (via Angelola) on the sire side of his pedigree, and fourth generation on the dam side of his pedigree.
