= Targowice =

American-bred Thoroughbred racehorse

- Sire: Round Table
- Grandsire: Princequillo
- Dam: Matriarch
- Damsire: Bold Ruler
- Sex: Stallion
- Foaled: 10 April 1970
- Country: United States
- Colour: Bay
- Breeder: Kerr Stables
- Owner: Germaine Wertheimer
- Trainer: Alec Head
- Record: 8: 5-0-0
- Earnings: £26,262

Major wins
- Prix Eclipse (1972); Prix Thomas Bryon (1972); Prix Djebel (1973)

Awards
- Top-rated French 2-y-o colt (1972); Timeform top-rated 2-y-o colt (1972); Timeform rating 130 (1972), 115 (1973)

Targowice (10 April 1970 – 2 April 1992) was an American-bred and French-trained Thoroughbred racehorse and sire. As a two-year-old, he was undefeated in three races including the Prix Eclipse and Prix Thomas Bryon, and was rated the best colt of his age in Europe. In 1973 Targowice won the Prix Djebel on his seasonal debut but won only minor race from four subsequent starts. As a breeding stallion he was best known as the sire of All Along who won the Prix de l'Arc de Triomphe and was named American Horse of the Year in 1983.

== Background ==
Targowice was a "most attractive" bay horse with a white sock on his left foreleg bred in Kentucky by Kerr Stable. He was sold for $49,000 as a foal and acquired by the Wertheimer family. He raced in the colours of Germaine, the widow of Pierre Wertheimer. The colt was sent to Europe and entered training with Alec Head in France and was ridden in most of his races by his trainer's son Freddy.

He was sired by Round Table a three-time American Turf Champion who was named Horse of the Year in 1958. He became a successful and influential breeding stallion who was named Leading sire in North America in 1972. He also had an impact in Europe, where his successful progeny included Baldric, Apalachee and Artaius. Targowice's dam Matriarch won three races and also produced Dona Ysidra, the dam of Manila.

== Racing career ==
=== 1972: two-year-old season ===
Targowice began his racing career by winning the Prix Fontenoy over 1600 metres. The colt was then dropped in distance for the Prix Eclipse over 1300 metres at Saint-Cloud Racecourse in October and won by five lengths from the filly Marschala. On 4 November he contested the Prix Thomas Bryon over 1500 metres at the same track and started the 1.7/1 favourite despite conceding weight to all eleven of his opponents. His most serious opponent appeared to be Kalamoun, whilst the other runners included Abu Simnel (runner-up in the Prix Saint-Roman) and the British-trained Pitskelly. After struggling to obtain a clear run, Targowice finished strongly to catch Kalamoun in the closing stages and won by a neck with Pitskelly a length and a half away in third place.

=== 1973: three-year-old season ===
On his first appearance of 1973 Targowice started 2/5 favourite for the Prix Djebel over 1400 metres at Maisons-Laffitte Racecourse on 30 March and won easily by one and a half lengths from Filitosa with four lengths back to El Rastro in third. He was then to England for the 2000 Guineas over the Rowley Mile at Newmarket Racecourse on 5 May. He started second favourite in an eighteen-runner field but became agitated in the preliminaries and was reluctant to enter the starting stalls. He never looked likely to win, began to struggle three furlongs out and finished tenth behind the 50/1 outsider Mon Fils. He was dropped in class for the Listed Prix de Pontarme at Chantilly Racecourse in June and won by a length. Later that month he was matched against older horses in the Prix d'Ispahan over 1850 metres at Longchamp Racecourse. He started favourite but was badly hampered in the straight and finished seventh behind the four-year-old filly La Troublerie although he was promoted to the sixth after the disqualification of Bog Road. On 25 August he was dropped back in distance for the Prix Quincey over 1600 metres at Deauville Racecourse and finished fourth behind African Dancer.

== Assessment ==
In 1972 the independent Timeform organisation made Targowice the top-rated two-year-old colt in Europe. Although they named the British colt The Go-Between their best two-year-old colt on 129, they rated Targowice a pound higher on 130, level with the Critérium de Saint-Cloud winner Simbir and three pounds behind the filly Jacinth. In the official French Free Handicap he was rated the best two-year-old of 1972, one pound ahead of Simbir and the Grand Critérium winner Satingo. In the following year he was rated 115 by Timeform, twenty-one pounds behind their top-rated three-year-old colt Thatch.

== Stud record ==
Targowice was retired from racing and began his stud career at a fee of £2000 at the Simmonstown Stud in Ireland. He later stood as a breeding stallion in France before being exported to Japan in 1980. After being exported his offspring began to make an impact in Europe: Prince Mab won the Prix de Cabourg in 1980, Ukraine Girl won the Poule d'Essai des Pouliches in 1981, and Tipperary Fixer won the Prix Kergorlay in 1981. By far the best of his offspring however was the outstanding racemare All Along whose wins included the Prix Vermeille, Prix de l'Arc de Triomphe, Turf Classic, Rothmans International and Washington, D.C. International. In Japan he sired 255 winners including Let's Go Tarquin who won the autumn edition of the Tenno Sho as a five-year-old. Targowice covered his last mares in 1992. He died on 2 April 1992.

== Pedigree ==
Pedigree of Targowice (USA), bay stallion, 1970
Sire Round Table (USA) 1954	Princequillo (IRE); 1940	Prince Rose	Rose Prince
Sire Round Table (USA) 1954	Princequillo (IRE); 1940	Prince Rose	Indolence
Sire Round Table (USA) 1954	Princequillo (IRE); 1940	Cosquilla	Papyrus
Sire Round Table (USA) 1954	Princequillo (IRE); 1940	Cosquilla	Quick Thought
Sire Round Table (USA) 1954	Knight's Daughter (GB); 1941	Sir Cosmo	The Boss
Sire Round Table (USA) 1954	Knight's Daughter (GB); 1941	Sir Cosmo	Hayn Ali
Sire Round Table (USA) 1954	Knight's Daughter (GB); 1941	Feola	Friar Marcus
Sire Round Table (USA) 1954	Knight's Daughter (GB); 1941	Feola	Aloe
Dam Matriarch (USA) 1964	Bold Ruler (USA); 1954	Nasrullah	Nearco
Dam Matriarch (USA) 1964	Bold Ruler (USA); 1954	Nasrullah	Mumtaz Begum
Dam Matriarch (USA) 1964	Bold Ruler (USA); 1954	Miss Disco	Discovery
Dam Matriarch (USA) 1964	Bold Ruler (USA); 1954	Miss Disco	Outdone
Dam Matriarch (USA) 1964	Lyceum (USA); 1948	Bull Lea	Bull Dog
Dam Matriarch (USA) 1964	Lyceum (USA); 1948	Bull Lea	Rose Leaves
Dam Matriarch (USA) 1964	Lyceum (USA); 1948	Colosseum	Ariel
Dam Matriarch (USA) 1964	Lyceum (USA); 1948	Colosseum	Arena (Family: 16-g)
