= Sandford Lad =

Irish-bred Thoroughbred racehorse

- Sire: St Alphage
- Grandsire: Red God
- Dam: Hill Queen
- Damsire: Djebe
- Sex: Stallion
- Foaled: 27 April 1970
- Country: Ireland
- Colour: Chestnut
- Breeder: Mrs P Grubb
- Owner: C T Olley
- Trainer: Ryan Price
- Record: 8: 7-1-0

Major wins
- King George Stakes (1973); Nunthorpe Stakes (1973); Prix de l'Abbaye (1973)

Awards
- Top-rated British-trained 3-y-o (1973); Timeform best sprinter (1973); Timeform rating 121 (1972), 133 (1973)

Sandford Lad (27 April 1970 – 28 March 1985) was an Irish-bred British-trained Thoroughbred racehorse and sire. He was a specialist sprinter who never raced beyond a distance of five furlongs in a racing career which lasted from June 1972 until October 1973. After being narrowly defeated on his racecourse debut he was never seriously challenged again and won his remaining seven races including the Errol Stakes at Epsom, the Pilgrim Stakes at Goodwood and the Prince of Wales's Stakes at York. In the following year he was undefeated in four starts, taking the Sheffield Handicap at Doncaster, the King George Stakes at Goodwood, the Nunthorpe Stakes at York and the Prix de l'Abbaye at Longchamp. He ended his second season as the top-rated sprinter in Europe. He later stood as a breeding stallion in Europe and Japan with limited success.

== Background ==
Sandford Lad was a "strong, good-looking" chestnut horse with a white blaze and a white sock on his right foreleg bred in Ireland by Mrs P Grubb. As a yearling he was offered for sale at the Doncaster Bloodstock Sales and was bought for 1,800 guineaas by representatives of C T Olley. He was sent into training with Ryan Price at his Down House stable in Findon, West Sussex.

Sandford Lad was from the first crop of foals sired by St Alphage, a sprinter who finished second in the King George Stakes. His dam Hill Queen failed to win a race but produced at least three other winners as well as the broodmare Blue Queen, whose descendants have included Opera House and Kayf Tara.

== Racing career ==
=== 1972: two-year-old season ===
On his racecourse debut Sandford Lad contested the Berkshire Stakes over five furlongs at Newbury Racecourse in June and finished second by half a length to Quentilian, a colt who went on to be runner-up in the Middle Park Stakes. He won his remaining three races, all over the minimum distance of five furlongs. In the Errol Stakes at Epsom Downs Racecourse later in June he led from the start before drawing away in the closing stages to win by five lengths from the filly Miss Slip, later to win the Molecomb Stakes. In the Pilgrim Stakes at Goodwood Racecourse in July he won by four lengths from Gracious Melody and Brave Lad, conceding eleven pounds to the runner-up. In the Prince of Wales's Stakes at York Racecourse in August he took the lea at half way and won by three lengths and half a length from Starch Reduced and High Fare.

In the autumn of 1972 it was reported that Sandford Lad was to be sold to race in the United States but the rumours came to nothing and he remained in training with Price,

=== 1973: three-year-old season ===
Sandford Lad had some injuries training problems in the eleven months which elapsed between his win at York in August 1972 and his return in the Sheffield Handicap at Doncaster Racecourse in July 1973. Opposed by four moderate opponents he carried top weight of 140 pounds and won by five lengths. At Goodwood he was stepped up in class and started 6/5 favourite for the Group Three King George Stakes in which he was set to receive weight from most of his major rivals. Ridden by Tony Murray he recorded his most important victory up to that point but was not particularly impressive as he won by only half a length from the four-year-old Workboy with Tickled Pink in third and the Temple Stakes winner Saulingo in third. At York in August Sandford Lad, with Murray again in the saddle, started at odds of 4/1 for the Nunthorpe Stakes. Workboy and Saulingo were again in opposition as well as Rapid River (Gimcrack Stakes), Daring Boy (National Stakes, Windsor Castle Stakes), The Go-Between (Cornwallis Stakes) and Balliol (Cork and Orrery Stakes). Sndford Lad gained a narrow advantage at half way and finished strongly to win by a length from Balliol, with The Go-Between in third.

On his final racecourse appearance, Sandford Lad was sent to France and started the 1.2/1 favourite for the Prix de l'Abbaye over 1000 metres at Longchamp Racecourse on 7 October. His old rivals Saulingo, The Go-Between and Brave Lad were in the field but his most serious opponent appeared to be the Irish mare Abergwaun (King's Stand Stakes) and the French two-year-old Moubariz. Racing on soft ground for the first time, Sandford Lad led from the start, shook of a challenge from the Portland Handicap winner Supreme Gift and won by two lengths from Abergwaun with Supreme Gift a further two lengths back in third.

== Assessment ==
In the 1972 Free Handicap, a ranking of the best two-year-olds to race in Britain, he was given a rating of 125 pounds, eight pounds behind the filly Jacinth and five behind the top-rated colt Noble Decree. The independent Timeform organisation gave him a rating of 121, twelve pounds inferior to Jacinth. In their annual Racehorses of 1972 Timeform opined that Sandford Lad "should make a fine sprinter" and would probably stay further than five furlongs. In the 1973 Free Handicap for three-year-old he was assigned a weight of 137 Pounds, making him the highest-rated three-year-old trained in England, but behind the French-trained filly Dahlia and the Irish-trained colt Thatch. He was rated superior to the winners of all five of the British Classic Races. Timeform gave him a rating of 133 and named him as their best sprinter of the year.

In their book A Century of Champions, based on a modified version of the Timeform system, John Randall and Tony Morris rated Sandford Lad the twenty-eighth best British or Irish-trained sprinter of the 20th century.

== Stud record ==
At the end of his three-year-old season, Sandford Lad was retired to become a breeding stallion at the Airlie Stud in County Dublin at a fee of 3,000 guineas. The best of his European offspring included Spindrifter (winner of 13 races as a two-year-old in 1980), Kearney (Cork and Orrery Stakes), Sandalay (Queen Alexandra Stakes), and Chris's Lad (runner-up in the Coventry Stakes) He was later exported to Japan where he sired 66 winners from six seasons at stud. His last season as an active stallion was 1985, and he died on 28 March 1985.

== Pedigree ==
Pedigree of Sandford Lad (GB), chestnut stallion, 1970
Sire St Alphage (GB) 1963	Red God (USA); 1954	Nasrullah	Nearco
Sire St Alphage (GB) 1963	Red God (USA); 1954	Nasrullah	Mumtaz Begum
Sire St Alphage (GB) 1963	Red God (USA); 1954	Spring Run	Menow
Sire St Alphage (GB) 1963	Red God (USA); 1954	Spring Run	Boola Brook
Sire St Alphage (GB) 1963	Sally Deans (GB); 1947	Fun Fair	Fair Trial
Sire St Alphage (GB) 1963	Sally Deans (GB); 1947	Fun Fair	Humoresque
Sire St Alphage (GB) 1963	Sally Deans (GB); 1947	Cora Deans	Coronach
Sire St Alphage (GB) 1963	Sally Deans (GB); 1947	Cora Deans	Jennie Deans
Dam Hill Queen (GB) 1958	Djebe (FR); 1945	Djebel	Tourbillon
Dam Hill Queen (GB) 1958	Djebe (FR); 1945	Djebel	Loika
Dam Hill Queen (GB) 1958	Djebe (FR); 1945	Catherine	Tiberius
Dam Hill Queen (GB) 1958	Djebe (FR); 1945	Catherine	Catherinette
Dam Hill Queen (GB) 1958	Home Rule (GB); 1950	Norseman	Umidwar
Dam Hill Queen (GB) 1958	Home Rule (GB); 1950	Norseman	Tara
Dam Hill Queen (GB) 1958	Home Rule (GB); 1950	Motherland	Gainsborough
Dam Hill Queen (GB) 1958	Home Rule (GB); 1950	Motherland	Fair Isle (Family 13-e)
