= Prix Eclipse =

Flat horse race in France

- Class: Group 3
- Location: Chantilly Racecourse; Chantilly, France
- Inaugurated: 1891
- Race type: Flat / Thoroughbred
- Website: france-galop.com

Race information
- Distance: 1,200 metres (6f)
- Surface: Turf
- Track: Straight
- Qualification: Two-year-olds excluding Group 2 winners
- Weight: 56 kg Allowances; 1½ kg for fillies Penalties; 3 kg if two Group 3 wins 2 kg if one Group 3 win
- Purse: €80,000 (2021); 1st: €40,000

Prix Eclipse
2025
Samangan	Ceramic	Graft

Previous years
2023
Dawn Charger	Laulne	Mr Fleurant
2022
Eddie's Boy	Denver Chop	Manhattan Jungle
2021
Topgear	Best Flying	Lovamour

2020-2011
2020
Plainchant	Legal Attack	Stardevote
2019
Devil	Nina Bailarina	Golden Boy
2018
Sporting Chance	Space Traveller	Graignes
2017
Sound And Silence	Coeur De Beaute	French Pegasus
2016
Sans Equivoque	King Of Spades	Fas
2015
Sasparella	Tourny	Venecia Style
2013
Kiram	High Duty	Another Party
2012
Penny's Picnic	Interesting	Chef Oui Chef
2011
Kendam	Chica Loca	Hi Molly

2010-2001
2010
Split Trois	Captain Chop	Spirit Of Battle
2009
Eightfold Path	Irish Cat	Absolute Music
2008
Smooth Operator	Saxford	Bonnie Charlie
2007
Domingues	Salut L'Africain	War Officer
2006
Iron Lips	Invincible Force	Adamantinos
2005
Damoiselle	Sweet Travel	Alyzea
2004
Imperial Applause	Crossover	Nipping
2003
Bonaire	Villadolide	Chineur
2002
Zinziberine	Acago	Traou Mad
2001
Perrexa	Hothaifah	War Zone

2000-1990
2000
Potaro	Inzar's Best	Stunning
1999
Perugina	Contexte	Touch Of The Blues
1998
Stella Berine	Zirconi	Felicita
1997
Merlin's Ring	Roi Gironde	Gold Away
1996
Hurricane State	Heaven's Command	Dissertation
1995
Titus Livius	Starmaniac	Seattle Special
1994
Top Shape	Privity	Super Vite
1993
Wood Of Binn	Volochine	Eternal Reve
1992
Elizabeth Bay	Wixon	Firm Friend
1991
Cardoun	Pia Bride	Stormagain
1990
Crack Regiment	As Que To	River Traffic

The Prix Eclipse is a Group 3 flat horse race in France open to two-year-old thoroughbreds. It is run at Chantilly over a distance of 1,200 metres (about 6 furlongs), and it is scheduled to take place each year in October.

== History ==
The event is named after the 18th-century racehorse Eclipse. It was established in 1891, and was originally contested at Maisons-Laffitte over 1,200 metres. It was extended to 1,400 metres in 1905, and to 1,600 metres in 1908.

The race was abandoned throughout World War I, with no running from 1914 to 1918. It was run over 1,500 metres in 1919. It was transferred to Saint-Cloud and cut to 1,300 metres in 1920. It returned to Maisons-Laffitte in 1923, and reverted to 1,200 metres in 1925.

Due to World War II, the Prix Eclipse was cancelled from 1939 to 1944. It resumed at Saint-Cloud with a distance of 1,500 metres in 1945. It was contested over 1,200 metres in 1946, and 1,600 metres in 1947. A new period over 1,200 metres began in 1948.

The race was run over 1,300 metres at Maisons-Laffitte in 1954. It returned to its previous length at Saint-Cloud in 1955. It was restored to 1,300 metres in 1966.

The Prix Eclipse was staged at Deauville from 1994 to 1996, and Saint-Cloud from 1997 to 2000. It was switched to Maisons-Laffitte and shortened to 1,200 metres in 2001.

In recent years, the race has had spells at Maisons-Laffitte (2001–03, 2005, 2010–11, 2016) and Chantilly (2004, 2006–09, 2012–2015).

== Records ==
Leading jockey (4 wins):

- Léon Flavien – Ara (1956), Megare (1958), Bondolfi (1959), Belmont (1969)
- Freddy Head – Prompt (1965), Targowice (1972), Aerosol (1976), Breath Taking (1984)

Leading trainer (6 wins):

- William Webb – Tournesol (1892), Beatrix (1894), Croix du Sud (1900), La Lorelei (1901), Zingara (1903), Ossian (1908)

Leading owner (5 wins):

- Edmond Blanc – Rueil (1891), Manitou (1897), Adam (1904), Belle Fleur (1905), Sloughi (1913)

== Winners since 1978 ==
Year	Winner	Jockey	Trainer	Owner	Time
1978	Ramanouche	Jacques Heloury	François Mathet	HH Aga Khan IV	1:20.50
1979	Suvero	Philippe Paquet	François Boutin	Gerry Oldham	1:22.10
1980	Phydilla	Alain Lequeux	Olivier Douieb	Robert Sangster
1981	Pas de Seul	Christy Roche	David O'Brien	Robert Sangster
1982	Crystal Glitters	Alfred Gibert	Mitri Saliba	Mahmoud Fustok
1983	Diamada	Alfred Gibert	Georges Bridgland	Mrs Paul Hexter
1984	Breath Taking	Freddy Head	Criquette Head	Robert Sangster
1985	Beaujolaise	Maurice Philipperon	Dominique Sépulchre	Edouard Pouret
1986	Holst	Cash Asmussen	André Fabre	Khalid Abdullah
1987	Radjhasi	Guy Guignard	Criquette Head	Haras d'Etreham
1988	Lioubovnik	Eric Saint-Martin	François Boutin	Mrs François Boutin	1:25.10
1989	Pole Position	Dominique Boeuf	André Fabre	Daniel Wildenstein	1:24.60
1990	Crack Regiment	Tony Cruz	John Fellows	Robin Scully	1:23.20
1991	Cardoun	Dominique Boeuf	Élie Lellouche	Edgard Zorbibe	1:21.00
1992	Elizabeth Bay	Steve Cauthen	André Fabre	Sheikh Mohammed	1:23.80
1993	Wood of Binn	Frédéric Sanchez	John Hammond	Henri Chalhoub	1:27.50
1994	Top Shape	Frédéric Sanchez	François Doumen	John Killer	1:16.00
1995	Titus Livius	Cash Asmussen	Jonathan Pease	Stavros Niarchos	1:15.20
1996	Hurricane State	Walter Swinburn	Peter Chapple-Hyam	Robert Sangster	1:19.40
1997	Merlin's Ring	Olivier Peslier	Ian Balding	Plummer & Partners	1:25.60
1998	Stella Berine	Sylvain Guillot	Pascal Bary	Ecurie Stella Maris	1:22.70
1999	Perugina	Thierry Gillet	Criquette Head	Gerry Oldham	1:22.70
2000	Potaro	Gérald Mossé	Brian Meehan	Susan McCarthy	1:20.80
2001	Perrexa	Dominique Boeuf	David Smaga	Thierry van Zuylen	1:16.50
2002	Zinziberine	Christophe Soumillon	André Fabre	Elisabeth Fabre	1:08.60
2003	Bonaire	Davy Bonilla	Carlos Laffon-Parias	Africa Cuadra-Lores	1:15.30
2004	Tremar ^{[a]}	Gary Carter	Terry Mills	Terry Jacobs	1:11.20
2005	Damoiselle	Davy Bonilla	Freddy Head	Ghislaine Head	1:10.70
2006	Iron Lips	Olivier Peslier	Carlos Laffon-Parias	Wertheimer et Frère	1:12.60
2007	Domingues	Declan McDonogh	Edward Lynam	Lady O'Reilly	1:13.40
2008	Smooth Operator	Andreas Helfenbein	Mario Hofer	Stall Jenny	1:13.00
2009	Eightfold Path	Stéphane Pasquier	Pascal Bary	Niarchos Family	1:13.80
2010	Split Trois	Christophe Lemaire	Yves de Nicolay	Christian de Villeneuve	1:16.90
2011	Kendam	Maxime Guyon	Henri-Alex Pantall	Guy Pariente	1:14.70
2012	Penny's Picnic	Thierry Jarnet	Didier Guillemin	G. De St Seine & T. Delegue	1:14.50
2013	Kiram	Christophe Soumillon	Jean-Claude Rouget	Aga Khan IV	1:11.79
2014	Souvenir Delondres	Maxime Guyon	Jonathan Pease	Chris Wright	1:13.32
2015	Sasparella	Maxime Guyon	Carlos Laffon-Parias	Wertheimer et Frère	1:13.82
2016	Sans Equivoque	Thierry Jarnet	Didier Guillemin	Haras d'Etreham	1:11.63
2017	Sound and Silence	James Doyle	Charlie Appleby	Golophin	1:13.81
2018	Sporting Chance	Silvestre de Sousa	Simon Crisford	Abdulla Al-Mansoori	1:10.15
2019	Devil	Maxime Guyon	Freddy Head	Wertheimer et Frère	1:10.26
2020	Plainchant	Valentin Seguy	Maurizio Guarnieri	Alain Jathiere	1:08.48
2021	Topgear	Stephane Pasquier	Fabrice Chappet	Hisaaki Saito	1:10.92
2022	Eddie's Boy	Hollie Doyle	Archie Watson	Middleham Park Racing	1:09.60
2026	Primetime Emmy	Mickael Barzalona	Francis-Henri Graffard	Hollymount Stud France SC	1:09.31

^{a} The 2004 winner Tremar was later exported to Hong Kong and renamed Imperial Applause.

== Earlier winners ==
- 1891: Rueil
- 1892: Tournesol
- 1893: Melchior
- 1894: Beatrix
- 1895: Olmutz
- 1896: Magister
- 1897: Manitou
- 1898: Listo
- 1899: Agathos
- 1900: Croix du Sud
- 1901: La Loreley
- 1902: Rafale
- 1903: Zingara
- 1904: Adam
- 1905: Belle Fleur
- 1906: Muscadet
- 1907: Lamaneur
- 1908: Ossian
- 1909: M'Amour
- 1910: Alcantara
- 1911: Rodriguez
- 1912: Sans le Sou
- 1913: Sloughi
- 1914–18: no race
- 1919: Campistron
- 1920: Cortland
- 1921: Frisky
- 1922: Sir Gallahad
- 1923: Tonton
- 1924: Coram
- 1925: Asterus
- 1926: Basilisque
- 1927: Cestona
- 1928: Touchaud
- 1929: Monsieur Loyal
- 1930: Alluvial
- 1931: Present
- 1932: Pampilhosa
- 1933: Rentenmark
- 1934: Le Gazon
- 1935: Alcali
- 1936: Le Chari
- 1937: Salieri
- 1938: Birikil
- 1939–44: no race
- 1945: Carrousel
- 1946: Djama
- 1947:
- 1948: Gismonda
- 1949: Major Morgane
- 1950: Astrild
- 1951:
- 1952: Arzetto
- 1953: Prudence
- 1954: Fakahina
- 1955: Vareta
- 1956: Ara
- 1957: Naharo
- 1958: Megare
- 1959: Bondolfi
- 1960: Moskova
- 1961: Prince Altana
- 1962:
- 1963: Belle Sicambre
- 1964: Radames
- 1965: Prompt
- 1966: Ascanio
- 1967: Cabhurst
- 1968: Oris
- 1969: Belmont
- 1970: Stratege
- 1971: Pompous
- 1972: Targowice
- 1973: Northern Taste
- 1974: Prince Show
- 1975: Roan Star
- 1976: Aerosol
- 1977: Binky

== See also ==
- List of French flat horse races
