= Kalamoun =

British-bred Thoroughbred racehorse

- Sire: Zeddaan
- Grandsire: Grey Sovereign
- Dam: Khairunissa
- Damsire: Prince Bio
- Sex: Stallion
- Foaled: 30 April 1970
- Died: 7 February 1979 (aged 8)
- Country: United Kingdom
- Colour: Grey
- Breeder: Aga Khan IV
- Owner: Aga Khan IV
- Trainer: François Mathet
- Record: 10: 4-4-0

Major wins
- Poule d'Essai des Poulains (1973); Prix Lupin (1973); Prix Jacques Le Marois (1973)

Awards
- Timeform rating 129 (1973)

Kalamoun (30 April 1970 – 7 February 1979) was a British-bred, French-trained Thoroughbred racehorse and sire. Owned and bred by the Aga Khan IV, he showed promise as a juvenile, winning once and running well in the Observer Gold Cup and the Prix Thomas Bryon. In the following year he emerged as one of the best colts of his generation in France, recording Group One victories the Poule d'Essai des Poulains, Prix Lupin and Prix Jacques Le Marois. He was retired at the end of the season and became a successful breeding stallion in a brief stud career.

== Background ==
Kalamoun was a grey horse with a white blaze bred in the United Kingdom by his owner the Aga Khan IV. He was sired by Zeddaan (1965–1984), whose wins included the Prix Robert Papin, Poule d'Essai des Poulains and Prix d'Ispahan. Zeddaan was a true-breeding (homozygous) grey, meaning that he produced only grey foals. Kalamoun's dam Khairunissa was a useful racemare who finished third in the Prix d'Arenberg in 1962 and was the daughter of an even faster mare in Palariva, whose wins included the King's Stand Stakes. Palariva was a granddaughter of Mumtaz Begum, whose other descendants included Nasrullah (horse), Royal Charger, Shergar and Risen Star.

During his racing career, Kalamoun was very dark in colour, although, like all greys, he lightened as he aged. The Aga Khan sent his colt into training with the veteran François Mathet at Chantilly. Kalamoun was ridden in most of his races by Henri Samani.

== Racing career ==
=== 1972: two-year-old season ===
Kalamoun began his racing career by finishing second over 1600 metres and then won a minor race over the same distance. He was then sent to England and moved up sharply in class to contest the Group One Observer Gold Cup over one mile at Doncaster Racecourse in October and finished fourth behind Noble Decree, Ksar and Stanleyville. On his return to France he contested the Group Three Prix Thomas Bryon over 1500 metres at Saint-Cloud Racecourse and finished second to Targowice.

=== 1973: three-year-old season ===
On his three-year-old debut, Kalamoun started at odds of 7/2 for the Prix de Fontainebleau over 1600 metres at Longchamp Racecourse on 1 April and finished second, half a length behind African Sky and two lengths ahead of the favourite Satingo (the winner of the 1972 Grand Critérium). Three weeks later Kalamoun met African Sky and Satingo again and started the 4.4/1 fourth choice in the betting for the Poule d'Essai des Poulains over the same course and distance. Restrained by Samani in the early stages, he turned into the straight eight lengths behind the leaders before producing a strong late run. Kalamoun took the lead in the closing stages and drew away to win by two lengths with the outsider Bally Game taking second ahead of Satingo and African Sky. The colt was then moved up in distance for the Group One Prix Lupin over 2100 metres on 13 May in which he was matched against the outstanding filly Allez France and the Prix Greffulhe winner Roi Lear. As in his previous race, the colt was held up at the back of the field before making rapid progress in the straight. He took the lead approaching the last 200 metres and won by one and a half lengths from Palikare with Roi Lear third and Allez France in seventh. On 3 June Kalamoun attempted to win his third consecutive Group One race when he was stepped up to 2400 metres for the Prix du Jockey Club on heavy ground at Chantilly Racecourse. He started second favourite but after challenging for the lead in the straight he tired to finish seventh, two lengths behind the winner Roi Lear.

For his last two races Kalamoun was brought back in distance to compete over 1600 metres. On 12 August at Deauville Racecourse he was matched against older horses for the first time in the Prix Jacques Le Marois and started the 13/10 favourite. His French opponents included Rose Laurel (Prix Eugène Adam), Margouillat (Prix Hocquart), African Sky and Princess Arjumand (runner up to Allez France in the Poule d'Essai des Pouliches), whilst Britain was represented by Boldboy and Sparkler (Queen Anne Stakes). Kalamoun produced what was arguably his best performance, taking the lead 2000 metres from the finish and accelerating away from his rivals to win by three lengths from Rose Laurel, with Sparkler and Boldboy in third and fourth. Kalamoun faced Sparkler again in the Prix du Moulin at Longchamp on 7 October and started the 1/2 favourite. Freddy Head replaced Samani as the colt's jockey, whilst Sparkler was ridden by Lester Piggott. Early in the straight, Sparkler accelerated clear of the field and although Kalamoun made steady progress he was never able to challenge the leader and finished second, beaten two lengths. Timeform felt that Head had ridden an "ill-judged race".

== Assessment ==
In 1973, the independent Timeform organisation gave Kalamoun a rating of 129, seven pounds inferior to their top-rated three-year-old Thatch. Their annual Racehorses of 1973 described him as "the best colt of his age in France at distances up to a mile and a quarter".

== Stud record ==
Before his last race, shares in Kalamoun were offered at a reported price of £25,000, giving him a theoretical value of £1 million. He was retired to the Aga Khan's Ballymany stud at the end of the 1973 season to begin his career as a breeding stallion. He was at stud for only five years and died on 7 February 1979. He had fertility problems towards the end of his life, siring only fifteen foals in his final season. His notable offspring included:

- Kenmare (foaled 1975). Won Prix Jacques Le Marois, sire of Vert Amande and damsire of Hurricane Fly. Kenmare also sired Kendor (Poule d'Essai des Poulains) and Highest Honor, who won the Prix d'Ispahan and sired California Memory.
- Castle Moon (1975). Unraced, dam of Moon Madness and Sheriff's Star
- Kampala (1976). Won Hungerford Stakes, sire of Tony Bin
- Tassmoun (1976). Won Prix Messidor
- Shakapour (1977). Won Grand Prix de Saint-Cloud
- Kalaglow (1978). Won Eclipse Stakes, King George VI and Queen Elizabeth Stakes, sire of Jeune
- Bikala (1978). Won Prix du Jockey Club
- Persepolis (1979). Won Prix Lupin, 4th in Epsom Derby

== Pedigree ==
Pedigree of Kalamoun (GB), grey stallion, 1970
Sire Zeddaan (GB) 1965	Grey Sovereign (GB); 1948	Nasrullah	Nearco
Sire Zeddaan (GB) 1965	Grey Sovereign (GB); 1948	Nasrullah	Mumtaz Begum
Sire Zeddaan (GB) 1965	Grey Sovereign (GB); 1948	Kong	Baytown
Sire Zeddaan (GB) 1965	Grey Sovereign (GB); 1948	Kong	Clang
Sire Zeddaan (GB) 1965	Vareta (FR); 1953	Vilmorin	Gold Bridge
Sire Zeddaan (GB) 1965	Vareta (FR); 1953	Vilmorin	Queen of the Meadows
Sire Zeddaan (GB) 1965	Vareta (FR); 1953	Veronique	Mon Talisman
Sire Zeddaan (GB) 1965	Vareta (FR); 1953	Veronique	Volubilis
Dam Khairunissa (GB) 1960	Prince Bio (FR); 1941	Prince Rose	Rose Prince
Dam Khairunissa (GB) 1960	Prince Bio (FR); 1941	Prince Rose	Indolence
Dam Khairunissa (GB) 1960	Prince Bio (FR); 1941	Biologie	Bacteriophage
Dam Khairunissa (GB) 1960	Prince Bio (FR); 1941	Biologie	Eponge
Dam Khairunissa (GB) 1960	Palariva (GB); 1953	Palestine	Fair Trial
Dam Khairunissa (GB) 1960	Palariva (GB); 1953	Palestine	Una
Dam Khairunissa (GB) 1960	Palariva (GB); 1953	Rivaz	Nearco
Dam Khairunissa (GB) 1960	Palariva (GB); 1953	Rivaz	Mumtaz Begum (Family 9-c)

- Kalamoun was inbred 4 x 4 to Nearco and Mumtaz Begum, meaning that these horses appeared twice in the fourth generation of his pedigree.
