= Prix Quincey =

Flat horse race in France

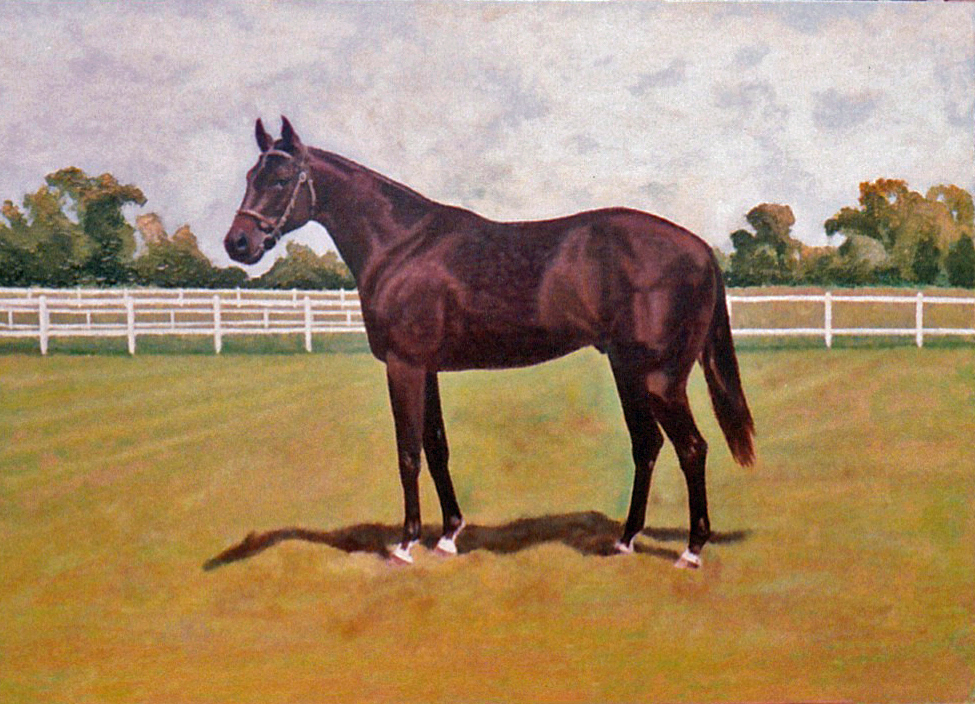
- Trepan, winner in 1977, oil on canvas painted by Bob Demuyser (1920-2003)
- Class: Group 3
- Location: Deauville Racecourse; Deauville, France
- Inaugurated: 1919
- Race type: Flat / Thoroughbred
- Sponsor: Lucien Barrière
- Website: france-galop.com

Race information
- Distance: 1,600 metres (1 mile)
- Surface: Turf
- Track: Straight
- Qualification: Four-years-old and up exc. G2 winners since 1 Oct
- Weight: 57 kg (4yo); Allowances; 1½ kg for fillies and mares 1 kg if not Group placed (since January 1 last year); Penalties; 2 kg for Group 3 winners (since 1 October last year)
- Purse: €56,000 (2020); 1st: €28,000

Prix Quincey
2024
Make Me King	Topgear	Sea Of Thieves

Previous years
2023
Poker Face	Gregarina	The Revenant
2022
Tempus	Internationalangel	Kennella
2021
Dilawar	Now We Know	National Service

2020-2011
2020
Stunning Spirit	We Ride The World	Les Vertus
2019
Skalleti	Stunning Spirit	Lilly Kafeine
2018
Graphite	Salsabeel	Stunning Spirit
2017
Attendu	Wireless	Dicton
2016
Siyoushake	Caointiorn	Waikika
2015
Johnny Barnes	Spoil The Fun	Stillman
2014
Solow	Spoil The Fun	Fire Ship
2013
Fire Ship	Belgian Bill	Spoil The Fun
2012
Fractional	Moonwalk In Paris	King Air
2011
Zinabaa	Sandy's Charm	African Story

2010-2001
2010
Elusive Wave	Vertigineux	Helene Spirit
2009
Racinger	Sahpresa	Kachgai
2008
Laa Rayb	Athanor	Holocene
2007
Kavafi	Ricine	Spirito Del Vento
2006
Hello Sunday	Racinger	Svedov
2005
Special Kaldoun	Cupid's Glory	Valentino
2004
Autumn Glory	Keltos	Mister Sacha
2003
My Risk	Star Valley	Green Channel
2002
Devious Indian	Dedication	Special Kaldoun
2001
Ing Ing	Arkadian Hero	Domedriver

2000-1990
2000
Penny's Gold	Island Sands	Leave Us Leap
1999
Mahboob	Sole Che Sorgi	Hoh Chi Min
1998
Perfect Vintage	Sand Falcon	Green Card
1997
Marathon	Parfait Glace	Trojan Sea
1996
Rising Colours	Trojan Sea	Barricade
1995
Two O'Clock Jump	Bishop Of Cashel	Philanthrop
1994
Pollen Count	Eternal Reve	Flagbird
1993
Bon Point	Sharman	En Attendant
1992
Dampierre	Burdur	Bakari
1991
Masterclass	Safawan	Bistro Garden
1990
Ocean Falls	River Of Light	Itsabrahma

The Prix Quincey is a Group 3 flat horse race in France open to thoroughbreds aged four years or older. It is run at Deauville over a distance of 1,600 metres (about 1 mile), and it is scheduled to take place each year in late August.

== History ==
The event was established in 1919, and it was originally called the Prix de la Plage Fleurie. It was named after the Plage Fleurie, the stretch of coastline where Deauville is located. The inaugural running was contested over 1,600 metres, but the distance was extended to 2,000 metres in 1920. It reverted to its original length the following year.

The race was renamed in memory of the Comte de Quincey (died 1924), a member of the Société d'Encouragement, in 1925. As the chief steward of this organisation, Quincey had instigated such decisions as the merger with the Société des Courses de Deauville and the creation of the Prix de l'Arc de Triomphe.

The Prix Quincey was cancelled twice during World War II, in 1940 and 1944. For the remainder of this period, while its regular venue was closed, the race was switched between Longchamp (1941–42, 1945) and Maisons-Laffitte (1943).

The race was originally open to three-year-olds. It was restricted to horses aged four or older from the 2018 running.

== Records ==
Most successful horse (2 wins):

- Golden Hope – 1924, 1925
- Sultanabad – 1950, 1951
- Sparkler – 1971, 1972

Leading jockey (5 wins):

- Jean Deforge – Finarosa (1954), Dog and Cat (1955), Fairey Gannet (1960), Clarionneur (1961), Seawell (1964)
- Freddy Head – Discordia (1966), Bellypha (1979), Kilijaro (1980), Phydilla (1981), Go Milord (1989)

Leading trainer (7 wins):

- André Fabre – Tobin Lad (1987), Masterclass (1991), Dampierre (1992), Bon Point (1993), Devious Indian (2002), Fractional (2012), Graphite (2018)

Leading owner (4 wins):

- Jefferson Davis Cohn – Imaginaire (1919), King Arthur (1926), Lion Hearted (1929), Slipper (1930)
- Daniel Wildenstein – African Sky (1973), Liloy (1974), Heraldiste (1985), Dampierre (1992)

== Winners since 1979 ==
Year	Winner	Age	Jockey	Trainer	Owner	Time
1979	Bellypha	3	Freddy Head	Alec Head	Jacques Wertheimer
1980	Kilijaro	4	Freddy Head	Olivier Douieb	Serge Fradkoff
1981	Phydilla	3	Freddy Head	Olivier Douieb	Robert Sangster
1982	King James	5	Gérard Dubroeucq	Guy Bonnaventure	Yvan Coscas
1983	Great Substence	5	Alfred Gibert	Mitri Saliba	Mahmoud Fustok
1984	Teleprompter	4	Brian Rouse	Bill Watts	18th Earl of Derby
1985	Heraldiste	3	Gérald Mossé	Patrick Biancone	Daniel Wildenstein
1986	Apeldoorn	4	Alain Badel	Philippe Barbe	Gabriel Coscas
1987	Tobin Lad	3	Gérald Mossé	André Fabre	Tony Richards
1988	Always Fair	3	Walter Swinburn	Sir Michael Stoute	Maktoum Al Maktoum	1:38.10
1989	Go Milord	3	Freddy Head	Marcel Rolland	Robert Dupuis	1:42.50
1990	Ocean Falls	4	Guy Guignard	Myriam Bollack-Badel	L. E. de Paula Machado	1:39.10
1991	Masterclass	3	Thierry Jarnet	André Fabre	Khalid Abdullah	1:37.10
1992	Dampierre	4	Thierry Jarnet	André Fabre	Daniel Wildenstein	1:44.60
1993	Bon Point	3	Thierry Jarnet	André Fabre	Khalid Abdullah	1:40.20
1994	Pollen Count	5	Gary Hind	John Gosden	Sheikh Mohammed	1:43.60
1995	Two O'Clock Jump	3	Gérald Mossé	Richard Hannon Sr.	Bob Lalemant	1:40.00
1996	Rising Colours	3	Alain Junk	Philippe Demercastel	Naji Pharaon	1:38.90
1997	Marathon	3	Olivier Doleuze	Criquette Head	Alec Head	1:43.80
1998	Perfect Vintage	8	Yutaka Take	Corine Barande-Barbe	NP Bloodstock Ltd	1:36.50
1999	Mahboob	4	Frédéric Spanu	John Hammond	Hamdan Al Maktoum
2000	Penny's Gold	3	Thierry Thulliez	Pascal Bary	Overbrook Farm	1:32.80
2001	Ing Ing	3	Dominique Boeuf	Nicolas Clément	André de Ganay	1:38.70
2002	Devious Indian	3	Olivier Plaçais	André Fabre	Edouard de Rothschild	1:38.20
2003	My Risk	4	Christophe Soumillon	Jean-Marie Béguigné	Roland Monnier	1:39.60
2004	Autumn Glory	4	Steve Drowne	Geoff Wragg	Mollers Racing	1:43.20
2005	Special Kaldoun	6	Dominique Boeuf	David Smaga	Ecurie Chalhoub	1:43.40
2006	Hello Sunday	3	Christophe Lemaire	Criquette Head-Maarek	Micheline Leurson	1:42.30
2007	Kavafi	5	Miguel Blancpain	Carlos Laffon-Parias	Leonidas Marinopoulos	1:42.50
2008	Laa Rayb	4	Royston Ffrench	Mark Johnston	Ahmed Al Maktoum	1:36.80
2009	Racinger	6	Davy Bonilla	Freddy Head	Hamdan Al Maktoum	1:34.20
2010	Elusive Wave	4	Ioritz Mendizabal	Jean-Claude Rouget	Martin Schwartz	1:41.10
2011	Zinabaa	6	Yannick Letondeur	Michel Macé	Ecurie Victoria Dreams	1:39.50
2012	Fractional	3	Maxime Guyon	André Fabre	Godolphin	1:35.50
2013	Fire Ship	4	Neil Callan	William Knight	IGP / Winkworth	1:39.70
2014	Solow	4	Olivier Peslier	Freddy Head	Wertheimer et Frère	1:42.75
2015	Johnny Barnes	3	Frankie Dettori	John Gosden	Bermuda Thoroughbred Racing Ltd	1:40.23
2016	Siyoushake	4	Stéphane Pasquier	Freddy Head	Roy Racing Ltd & A Morley	1:37.98
2017	Attendu	4	Maxime Guyon	Carlos Laffon-Parias	Wertheimer & Frere	1:40.01
2018	Graphite	4	Mickael Barzalona	André Fabre	Godolphin	1:36.93
2019	Skalleti	4	Pierre-Charles Boudot	Jerome Reynier	Jean-Claude Seroul	1:35.70
2020	Stunning Spirit	6	Mickael Barzalona	Frederic Rossi	Le Haras De La Gousserie	1:42.71
2021	Dilawar	4	Christophe Soumillon	Alain de Royer-Dupré	Aga Khan IV	1:36.20
2022	Tempus	6	Hollie Doyle	Archie Watson	Hambleton Racing	1:34.94
2023	Poker Face	6	Christophe Soumillon	Simon & Ed Crisford	Edward Ware	1:41.12
2024	Make Me King	4	James Doyle	Hamad Al Jehani	Wathnan Racing	1:39.54

== Earlier winners ==
- 1919: Imaginaire
- 1920: Sourbier
- 1921: Bateau
- 1922: Zariba
- 1923: Select
- 1924: Golden Hope
- 1925: Golden Hope
- 1926: King Arthur
- 1927: Songe
- 1928: Dickens
- 1929: Lion Hearted
- 1930: Slipper
- 1931: Wood Violet
- 1932: Ziani
- 1933: Traghetto
- 1934: Jocrisse
- 1935: Tara
- 1936: Pamina
- 1937: Skylight
- 1938: Miraculeux
- 1939: Celticius
- 1940: no race
- 1941: Novalaise
- 1942: Balthazar
- 1943: Puymirol
- 1944: no race
- 1945:
- 1946: Cuadrilla
- 1947: Clarion
- 1948: Damnos
- 1949:
- 1950: Sultanabad
- 1951: Sultanabad
- 1952:
- 1953: Dynastie
- 1954: Finarosa
- 1955: Dog and Cat
- 1956: Djanet
- 1957: El Relicario
- 1958: Baba au Rhum
- 1959: Balleroy
- 1960: Fairey Gannet
- 1961: Clarionneur
- 1962: Nice Guy
- 1963: Crossen
- 1964: Seawell
- 1965: White Fire
- 1966: Discordia
- 1967: St Padarn
- 1968: Presto
- 1969: Habitat
- 1970: Lorenzaccio
- 1971: Sparkler
- 1972: Sparkler
- 1973: African Sky
- 1974: Liloy
- 1975: Brinkmanship
- 1976: Ellora
- 1977: Trepan
- 1978: Lypheor

== See also ==
- List of French flat horse races
- Recurring sporting events established in 1919 – this race is included under its original title, Prix de la Plage Fleurie.
