= Simbir =

British-bred Thoroughbred racehorse

- Sire: Shantung
- Grandsire: Sicambre
- Dam: Hevea
- Damsire: Herbager
- Sex: Stallion
- Foaled: 14 March 1970
- Country: United Kingdom
- Colour: Chestnut
- Owner: Arpad Plesch
- Trainer: François Mathet
- Record: 3: 2-0-1

Major wins
- Critérium de Saint-Cloud (1972)

Awards
- Timeform top-rated 2-y-o colt (1972); Timeform rating 130 (1972)

Simbir (14 March 1970 – 28 October 1982) was a British-bred French-trained Thoroughbred racehorse and sire. After winning a minor race on his debut he established himself as one of the best colts of his generation in Europe with an emphatic victory in the Critérium de Saint-Cloud. In the following spring he sustained his first defeat when he finished second in the Prix Daru. His career was ended by a training injury a few weeks later. He stood as breeding stallion in Ireland and Japan with moderate results.

== Background ==
Simbir was a chestnut horse with a white blaze and a white sock on his right hind leg, bred in the United Kingdom. During his racing career he was owned by Arpad Plesch and was trained in France by François Mathet.

He was sired by Shantung, a French horse who finished an unlucky third in the 1959 Epsom Derby. As a breeding stallion he also sired the classic winners Ginevra and Full Dress. Simbir's dam Hevea won a handicap race over 1600 metres in France and became a successful broodmare, also producing Simbir's full-sister Saraca whose wins included the Prix Saint-Alary and the Prix Vermeille. She was descended from the British mare Phase, the ancestor of many major winners including Hethersett and Neasham Belle.

== Racing career ==
=== 1972: two-year-old season ===
On his racecourse debut, Simbir contested a maiden race over 1600 metres at Saint-Cloud Racecourse and won by two lengths from moderate opposition. At the same track on 13 November he was stepped up in class and distance for the Critérium de Saint-Cloud over 2000 metres in which he was partnered by Bill Pyers. Ben Trovato started the 6/4 favourite after finishing a close second to Satingo in the Grand Critérium with Simbir next in the betting on 4.6/1. The other fancied runners included Robertino (a half-brother to Roberto) and Valauris (runner-up in the Prix de Condé). Simbir began to make progress on the final turn, took the lead in the straight and won impressively by two and a half lengths from Robertino with a further two and a half lengths back to Ben Trovato in third place.

=== 1973: three-year-old season ===
On 15 April at Longchamp, Simbir began his second season in the Prix Daru a race which serves as an early trial for the Prix du Jockey Club. Ridden by Henri Samani he started favourite but was overtaken and beaten a neck by Rose Laurel. Following a stewards' inquiry he was relegated to third for causing interference to the third-placed finisher Valuta. He was nevertheless aimed at the Prix du Jockey but sustained a split pastern in training and did not race again.

== Assessment ==
In 1972 the independent Timeform organisation made Simbir the top-rated two-year-old colt in Eusrope. Although they named the British colt The Go-Between their best two-year-old colt on 129, they rated Simbir a pound higher on 130, level with the Prix Thomas Bryon winner Targowice and three pounds behind the filly Jacinth. In the official French Free Handicap he was rated the third best two-year-old of 1972, one pound behind Targowice and level with the Grand Critérium winner Satingo. In their annual Racehorses of 1972, Timeform commented "of all the two-year-old colts of 1972, none appeals more as a prospective classic winner than Simbir".

== Stud record ==
Simbir was retired from racing to become a breeding stallion in Ireland, beginning his stud career at the Grangewilliam Stud, Maynooth, County Kildare. He was exported to Japan in 1980 where he covered his last mares in 1982. He died on 28 October 1982. His progeny included Slaney Idol who won the Nijinsky Stakes in 1978 and the Supreme Novices' Hurdle two years later.

== Pedigree ==
Pedigree of Simbir (GB), chestnut stallion, 1970
Sire Shantung (FR) 1956	Sicambre (FR); 1948	Prince Bio	Prince Rose
Sire Shantung (FR) 1956	Sicambre (FR); 1948	Prince Bio	Biologie
Sire Shantung (FR) 1956	Sicambre (FR); 1948	Sif	Rialto
Sire Shantung (FR) 1956	Sicambre (FR); 1948	Sif	Suavita
Sire Shantung (FR) 1956	Barley Corn (GB); 1950	Hyperion	Gainsborough
Sire Shantung (FR) 1956	Barley Corn (GB); 1950	Hyperion	Selene
Sire Shantung (FR) 1956	Barley Corn (GB); 1950	Schiparelli	Schiavoni
Sire Shantung (FR) 1956	Barley Corn (GB); 1950	Schiparelli	Aileen
Dam Hevea (GB) 1961	Herbager (FR); 1956	Vandale	Plassy
Dam Hevea (GB) 1961	Herbager (FR); 1956	Vandale	Vanille
Dam Hevea (GB) 1961	Herbager (FR); 1956	Flagette	Escamillo
Dam Hevea (GB) 1961	Herbager (FR); 1956	Flagette	Fidgette
Dam Hevea (GB) 1961	Princesse Reine (FR); 1954	Prince Chevalier	Prince Rose
Dam Hevea (GB) 1961	Princesse Reine (FR); 1954	Prince Chevalier	Chevalerie
Dam Hevea (GB) 1961	Princesse Reine (FR); 1954	Kingscavil	Fair Trial
Dam Hevea (GB) 1961	Princesse Reine (FR); 1954	Kingscavil	Phase (Family: 21-a)
