= Prix Thomas Bryon =

Flat horse race in France

- Class: Group 3
- Location: Saint-Cloud Racecourse; Saint-Cloud, France
- Inaugurated: 1924
- Race type: Flat / Thoroughbred
- Website: france-galop.com

Race information
- Distance: 1,400 metres (7 furlongs)
- Surface: Turf
- Track: Left-handed
- Qualification: Two-year-olds excluding Group 1 winners
- Weight: 56½ kg Allowances; 1½ kg for fillies Penalties; 2½ kg for Group 2 winners 2½ kg if two Group 3 wins 1½ kg if one Group 3 win
- Purse: €80,000 (2021); 1st: €40,000

Prix Thomas Bryon
2024
Maranoa Charlie	Iowa City	Harvey

Previous years
2023
Alcantor	Saganti	Havana Cigar
2022
Continuous	Make Me King	Times Boulevard
2021
Dreamflight	Making Moovies	Chancellery

2020-2011
2020
Normandy Bridge	Homeryan	Naval Crown
2019
King's Command	Royal Crusade	Wooded
2017
Sacred Life	Alba Power	Julio
2016
Mate Story	Dame Du Roi	North Thunder
2015
Candide	Hiort	Cheikeljack
2014
Alea Iacta	Alpha Bravo	Karaktar
2013
Earnshaw	Stillman	Marbre Rose
2012
Kitaya	Kenhope	Visiyani
2011
Abtaal	French Fifteen	Ice Cool

2010-2001
2010
Maxios	Private Jet	Grand Vent
2009
Circumvent	Silver Grey	Ameer
2008
Silver Frost	Fuisse	Topclas
2007
Thewayyouare	Centennial	Macellya
2006
Makaan	Holocene	Russian Desert
2005
Set Alight	Zatonic	Top Wave
2004
Campo Bueno	Guillaume Tell	Osidy
2003
Apsis	Gwaihir	Always King
2002
Songlark	Sylvestre	Oupoukaye
2001
Act One	Rouvres	Westcliffe

2000-1990
2000
Chichicastenango	Denon	Champetre
1999
Hightori	Crystal D'Ass	Premier Pas
1998
Pinakaral	Wicked Clutch	Max Tyson
1997
Gold Away	Soeur Ti	Fontevrault
1996
Varxi	Aneysar	Keos
1995
Ashkalani	Mayoumbe	Gaitero
1994
Housamix	Suresnes	Veridique
1993
Fadeyev	Ocean Indien	Dare And Go
1992
Mil Foil	Kingmambo	Berdansk
1991
Code Breaker	Tabac	Sharp Counsel
1990
Exit To Nowhere	Reason To Trick	As Que To

The Prix Thomas Bryon is a Group 3 flat horse race in France open to two-year-old thoroughbreds. It is run at Saint-Cloud over a distance of 1,400 metres (about 7 furlongs), and it is scheduled to take place each year in October.

== History ==
The event is named after Thomas Bryon, an Englishman who helped establish thoroughbred racing in France. He was the secretary at the founding meeting of the Société d'Encouragement in 1833, and published the first volume of the Calendrier des Courses de Chevaux in 1834.

The Prix Thomas Bryon was established in 1924, and it was initially contested over 1,600 metres. It was shortened to 1,500 metres in 1927. It was abandoned throughout World War II, with no running from 1939 to 1945.

The race took place at Longchamp in 1954, and at this point it reverted to 1,600 metres. It began a second period over 1,500 metres in 1958.

The Prix Thomas Bryon was restored to 1,600 metres in 1991. It was staged in November from 1995 to 2000, and was switched to the first half of October in 2001. The distance was reduced to 1,400 metres again in 2015 as part of a series of changes to autumn races for two-year-olds.

In 2025, the Prix Thomas Byron was held at the Chantilly racecourse with a change of date in the French racing schedule, as well as in surface and distance. Indeed, still reserved for two-year-olds, the Prix Thomas Byron was run over 1800m PSF on November 18, 2025.

== Records ==
Leading jockey (4 wins):

- Roger Poincelet – Iror (1947), Fort Napoleon (1949), Atrax (1959), Blaze of Glory (1961)
- Yves Saint-Martin – Sweet Girl (1960), Paolina (1963), First Bloom (1971), Melyno (1981)
- Maxime Guyon - Abtaal (2011), Earnshaw (2013), Alea Iacta (2014), Dreamflight (2021)

Leading trainer (11 wins):

- André Fabre – Fadeyev (1993), Housamix (1994), Pinakaral (1998), Songlark (2002), Apsis (2003), Thewayyouare (2007), Earnshaw (2013), Alea Iacta (2014), Candide (2015), Dreamflight (2021), Alcantor (2023)

Leading owner (4 wins):

- François Dupré – Apostol (1956), Regent (1958), Sweet Girl (1960), Paolina (1963)
- Guy de Rothschild – Chesa (1962), Fermina (1965), General (1976), Kenmare (1977)

== Winners since 1978 ==
Year	Winner	Jockey	Trainer	Owner	Time
1978	Bellypha	Jackie Taillard	Alec Head	Jacques Wertheimer
1979	Nureyev	Philippe Paquet	François Boutin	Stavros Niarchos	1:40.40
1980	Big John	Georges Doleuze	E. Chevalier du Fau	John Michael
1981	Melyno	Yves Saint-Martin	François Mathet	Stavros Niarchos
1982	Bal des Fees	Alfred Gibert	Noël Pelat	Hubert de Chaudenay
1983	Polly's Ark	Cash Asmussen	François Boutin	Jean-Luc Lagardère
1984	Petit Bonhomme	Henri Samani	Freddie Palmer	Gérard de Waldner
1985	Secret Form	Alain Badel	Pascal Bary	Peter Goulandris
1986	Glory Forever	Jorge Velásquez	Steve Norton	Ahmed bin Salman
1987	Raise a Memory	Tony Cruz	Patrick Biancone	Alan Clore
1988	Silicon Lady	Guy Guignard	Jonathan Pease	John Goelet	1:37.10
1989	Septieme Ciel	Guy Guignard	Criquette Head	Johnny Jones	1:34.60
1990	Exit to Nowhere	Freddy Head	François Boutin	Stavros Niarchos	1:34.20
1991	Code Breaker	Éric Legrix	Pascal Bary	Ecurie I. M. Fares	1:46.10
1992	Mil Foil	Mathieu Boutin	Jonathan Pease	Henry Seymour	1:48.70
1993	Fadeyev	Thierry Jarnet	André Fabre	Maktoum Al Maktoum	1:47.90
1994	Housamix	Sylvain Guillot	André Fabre	Jean-Luc Lagardère	1:46.10
1995	Ashkalani	Gérald Mossé	Alain de Royer-Dupré	Aga Khan IV	1:42.30
1996	Varxi	Dominique Boeuf	David Smaga	Thierry van Zuylen	1:53.80
1997	Gold Away	Olivier Peslier	Criquette Head	Wertheimer et Frère	1:49.40
1998	Pinakaral	Thierry Jarnet	André Fabre	Jean-Luc Lagardère	1:54.40
1999	Hightori	Gérald Mossé	Philippe Demercastel	Ecurie Bader	1:49.80
2000	Chichicastenango	Alain Junk	Philippe Demercastel	Béatrice Brunet	1:53.40
2001	Act One	Thierry Gillet	Jonathan Pease	Gerald Leigh	1:46.00
2002	Songlark	Christophe Soumillon	André Fabre	Sheikh Mohammed	1:47.00
2003	Apsis	Richard Hughes	André Fabre	Khalid Abdullah	1:44.00
2004	Vatori	Stéphane Pasquier	Philippe Demercastel	Ecurie Bader	1:43.20
2005	Set Alight	Christophe Lemaire	Criquette Head-Maarek	Khalid Abdullah	1:41.70
2006	Makaan	Davy Bonilla	Freddy Head	Hamdan Al Maktoum	1:41.50
2007	Thewayyouare	Stéphane Pasquier	André Fabre	Sean Mulryan	1:44.90
2008	Silver Frost	Olivier Peslier	Yves de Nicolay	John Cotton	1:41.70
2009	Circumvent	Ioritz Mendizabal	Paul Cole	Fairy Story Partnership	1:45.10
2010	Maxios	Christophe Lemaire	Jonathan Pease	Niarchos Family	1:48.30
2011	Abtaal	Maxime Guyon	Jean-Claude Rouget	Hamdan Al Maktoum	1:49.80
2012	US Law (aka Kitaya)	Christophe Soumillon	Pascal Bary	Ecurie J-L Bouchard	1:52.50
2013	Earnshaw	Maxime Guyon	André Fabre	Godolphin	1:47.70
2014	Alea Iacta	Maxime Guyon	André Fabre	Kirsten Rausing	1:44.28
2015	Candide	Pierre-Charles Boudot	André Fabre	Édouard de Rothschild	1:29.71
2016	Mate Story	Christophe Soumillon	David Smaga	Aleyrion Bloodstock Ltd	1:27.91
2017	Sacred Life	Theo Bachelot	Stephane Wattel	Ecurie Jean-Louis Bouchard	1:29.82
2018	East	Stéphane Pasquier	Kevin Ryan	East Partners	1:27.84
2019	King's Command	Mickael Barzalona	Charlie Appleby	Godolphin	1:31.49
2020	Normandy Bridge	Theo Bachelot	Stephanie Nigge	Gerry Ryan	1:47.85
2021	Dreamflight	Maxime Guyon	André Fabre	Lady Bamford	1:45.02
2022	Continuous	Ryan Moore	Aidan O'Brien	Smith / Magnier / Tabor / Westerberg	1:45.86
2023	Alcantor	Mickael Barzalona	André Fabre	Édouard de Rothschild	1:41.35
2024	Maranoa Charlie	Aurélien Lemaitre	Christopher Head	Peter Maher, Carl Fitzgerald and John Baxter	1:44.85
2025	Al Zanati	William Buick	Charlie Appleby	Goldophin	1:48.61

== Earlier winners ==
- 1924: Frisette
- 1925: Nino
- 1926: Farnese / Pescaro *
- 1927: Costette
- 1928: Meeting
- 1929: Potiphar
- 1930: Mydas
- 1931: Formosan / Pure Folie *
- 1932: Bipearl
- 1933: Mas d'Antibes
- 1934: Sanglot
- 1935: Fastnet
- 1936: Solace
- 1937: La Sultane
- 1938: Blue Moon
- 1939–45: no race
- 1946:
- 1947: Iror
- 1948: Tulette
- 1949: Fort Napoleon
- 1950: Mat de Cocagne
- 1951: La Mirambule
- 1952: For Chemist
- 1953:
- 1954:
- 1955: Cernobbio
- 1956: Apostol
- 1957: La Malivoye
- 1958: Regent
- 1959: Atrax
- 1960: Sweet Girl
- 1961: Blaze of Glory
- 1962: Chesa
- 1963: Paolina
- 1964: Faristan
- 1965: Fermina
- 1966: Farabi
- 1967: Lady Millie
- 1968: Beaugency
- 1969: Army Court
- 1970: Old and Wise
- 1971: First Bloom
- 1972: Targowice
- 1973: Northern Taste
- 1974: Dealer's Ace
- 1975: Arctic Tern
- 1976: General
- 1977: Kenmare

* The 1926 and 1931 races were dead-heats and have joint winners.

== See also ==
- List of French flat horse races
