= Mon Fils =

British Thoroughbred racehorse (1970–1979)

- Sire: Sheshoon
- Grandsire: Precipitation
- Dam: Now What
- Damsire: Premonition
- Sex: Stallion
- Foaled: 1970
- Country: United Kingdom
- Colour: Brown
- Breeder: Brenda Davis
- Owner: Brenda Davis
- Trainer: Richard Hannon Sr.
- Record: 10: 3-1-1 (incomplete)

Major wins
- Mill Reef Stakes (1972); 2000 Guineas (1973); Timeform rating: 124

Mon Fils (1970–1979) was a British Thoroughbred racehorse and sire, best known for winning the classic 2000 Guineas in 1973. As a two-year-old, Mon Fils won two of his seven races, including the Mill Reef Stakes. In 1973 he won the 2000 Guineas on soft ground, but ran poorly when strongly fancied for the Derby. His racing career was ended by injury in the autumn of 1973 and he was retired to stud, where he made no impact as a sire of winners. He was the first classic winner to be trained by Richard Hannon Sr.

== Background ==
Mon Fils was a big, tall brown horse with a small white star and a white coronet on his left hind foot, bred by his owner Mrs Brenda Davis. He was sired by Sheshoon, an outstanding stayer who won the Grand Prix de Saint-Cloud and the Ascot Gold Cup in 1960. As a breeding stallion his overall record was disappointing but he did sire the Prix de l'Arc de Triomphe winner Sassafras. Mon Fils' dam Now What also produced the Prix Messidor winner Son of Silver and was a granddaughter of Nonats, a broodmare whose other descendants included the leading sprinter Silly Season and the Irish 1,000 Guineas winner Saoire.

The colt was sent into training with the twenty-seven-year-old Richard Hannon Sr. at his stables at East Everleigh in Wiltshire.

== Racing career ==
=== 1972: two-year-old season ===
Mon Fils was highly tried as a two-year-old in 1972, running seven times and winning twice. He won the Warminster Stakes at Salisbury Racecourse and recorded his most important win of the year when taking the inaugural running of the Mill Reef Stakes over six furlongs at Newbury Racecourse by a head from Tudenham. He also finished second in the Chesham Stakes at Royal Ascot. In his final race of the season he was tried over one mile in the Observer Gold Cup in which he finished unplaced behind Noble Decree. In the Free Handicap, a rating of the year's best two-year-olds, he was assigned a weight of 116 pounds, fourteen pounds behind the top-rated Noble Decree.

=== 1973: three-year-old season ===
On his three-year-old debut, Mon Fils ran in the Greenham Stakes at Newbury, in which he finished third to Boldboy (who as a gelding, was not eligible for the classics) and the Dewhurst Stakes winner Lunchtime. On 5 May, Mon Fils was one of eighteen colts to contest the 175th running of the 2000 Guineas over Newmarket's Rowley Mile course. On rain-softened ground he started a 50/1 outsider and was ridden by the forty-six-year-old veteran Frankie Durr. Mon Fils led from the start and although briefly overtaken by Noble Decree, he rallied inside the final furlong to regain the lead and win by a head.

Mon Fils was then moved up in distance to contest the Derby Stakes over one and a half miles at Epsom Downs Racecourse. He was strongly fancied for the race, but struggled to cope with the firm ground and the distance, finishing eighteenth of the twenty-five runners behind Morston. After his defeat at Epsom, Mon Fils was sent to be trained in Ireland by Vincent O'Brien. He developed tendon trouble and did not race again.

== Assessment ==
In their book A Century of Champions, based on a modified version of the Timeform system, John Randall and Tony Morris rated Mon Fils an "inferior" winner of the 2000 Guineas.

== Stud record ==
Mon Fils was retired to the Hamilton Stud at Newmarket and was exported to France in 1975. He had little impact as breeding stallion in either location. His last recorded foals were born in 1978 and he was reported dead in 1979.

== Pedigree ==
Pedigree of Mon Fils (GB), brown stallion, 1970
Sire Sheshoon (GB) 1956	Precipitation* (GB); 1933	Hurry On**	Marcovil
Sire Sheshoon (GB) 1956	Precipitation* (GB); 1933	Hurry On**	Tout Suite
Sire Sheshoon (GB) 1956	Precipitation* (GB); 1933	Double Life*	Bachelor's Double
Sire Sheshoon (GB) 1956	Precipitation* (GB); 1933	Double Life*	Saint Joan
Sire Sheshoon (GB) 1956	Noorani (GB); 1950	Nearco	Pharos
Sire Sheshoon (GB) 1956	Noorani (GB); 1950	Nearco	Nogara
Sire Sheshoon (GB) 1956	Noorani (GB); 1950	Empire Glory	Singapore
Sire Sheshoon (GB) 1956	Noorani (GB); 1950	Empire Glory	Skyglory
Dam Now What (GB) 1956	Premonition (GB); 1950	Precipitation*	Hurry On*
Dam Now What (GB) 1956	Premonition (GB); 1950	Precipitation*	Double Life*
Dam Now What (GB) 1956	Premonition (GB); 1950	Trial Ground	Fair Trial*
Dam Now What (GB) 1956	Premonition (GB); 1950	Trial Ground	Tip the Wink
Dam Now What (GB) 1956	Orange Flash (GB); 1951	Court Martial	Fair Trial*
Dam Now What (GB) 1956	Orange Flash (GB); 1951	Court Martial	Instantaneous
Dam Now What (GB) 1956	Orange Flash (GB); 1951	Nonats	King Salmon
Dam Now What (GB) 1956	Orange Flash (GB); 1951	Nonats	Whitebait (Family 1-g)

* Mon Fils is inbred 2S × 3D to the stallion Precipitation, meaning that he appears second generation on the sire side of his pedigree and third generation on the dam side of his pedigree.

* Mon Fils is inbred 4D × 4D to the stallion Fair Trial, meaning that he appears twice fourth generation on the dam side of his pedigree.
