= Jacinth (horse) =

Irish-bred Thoroughbred racehorse

- Sire: Red God
- Grandsire: Nasrullah
- Dam: Jaffa
- Damsire: Right Royal
- Sex: Mare
- Foaled: 1970
- Country: Ireland
- Colour: Bay
- Breeder: William Hill
- Owner: Lady Butt
- Trainer: Bruce Hobbs
- Record: 7: 5-2-0

Major wins
- Cheveley Park Stakes (1972); Coronation Stakes (1973); Falmouth Stakes (1973); Goodwood Mile (1973)

Awards
- Top-rated British-trained two-year-old (1972); Timeform top-rated two-year-old (1972); Timeform rating: 133

Jacinth (1970–1992) was a British Thoroughbred racehorse and broodmare. In a racing career which lasted from May 1972 until August 1973 she won five of her seven races and finished second in the other two. In 1972 she was rated the best two-year-old of either sex in Britain on the strength of a five length win in the Cheveley Park Stakes. In the following season she was beaten when odds-on favourite for the classic 1000 Guineas but went on to win the Coronation Stakes, Falmouth Stakes and Goodwood Mile. She was retired to stud and had some success as a dam of winners. She died in 1992.

== Background ==
Jacinth was a big, powerful, good-looking bay mare with a white sock on her left hind leg bred by the stud of the British bookmaker William Hill. She was sired by Red God a successful racehorse in Europe and North America who had a lasting influence on Thoroughbred racing as the sire of the stallion Blushing Groom. Jacinth's dam Jaffa, was a successful racehorse over long distances and a granddaughter of Daring Miss, whose other descendants included Humble Duty and the Poule d'Essai des Pouliches winner Danseuse du Soir.

As a yearling in 1971, the filly was sent to the Houghton Sales at Newmarket, Suffolk where she was bought by Sir Kenneth Butt for 16,500 guineas. She raced in the colours of Sir Kenneth's wife and was trained by Bruce Hobbs at his Palace House stable in Newmarket. Jacinth was ridden in all of her major races by the South African-born jockey John Gorton.

== Racing career ==
=== 1972: two-year-old season ===
Jacinth began her racing career at Newmarket Racecourse in May, when she won the George Lambton Stakes over five furlongs. After a break of three months she was sent to York Racecourse for the Lowther Stakes, then a Group Three race, in which she was set to be matched against Bitty Girl, a filly who had won both the Queen Mary Stakes and the Molecomb Stakes. Her temperament became a problem before the start as she refused to enter the starting stalls and took no part in the race, which was won in her absence by Bitty Girl.

In October, Jacinth returned in Britain's most prestigious race for two-year-old fillies, the Cheveley Park Stakes over six furlongs at Newmarket. She started at odds of 9/2 against a field which included Marble Arch, an Irish filly who had defeated colts to win the Phoenix Stakes and the Norfolk Stakes. Jacinth took the lead soon after the start and won very impressively by five lengths from Caspian, with Marble Arch in third place. At the end of the season Timeform commented that in the following year's 1000 Guineas "Jacinth has only to go into the stalls to be past the post!"

=== 1973: three-year-old season ===
In the spring of 1973, Hobbs sent Jacinth straight for the 1000 Guineas without a trial race. She was made 4/5 favourite against thirteen opponents for the classic over Newmarket's Rowley Mile course on 3 May. She started well and took the lead three furlongs from the finish but was overtaken and beaten three lengths into second place by Mysterious.

In June Jacinth returned for the Coronation Stakes (then a Group Two race) at Royal Ascot and won easily at odds of 15/8 from Silver Birch. In the following month she was made 2/5 favourite for the Group Three Falmouth Stakes at Newmarket and won by three lengths, with Silver Birch again taking second place. On 1 August Jacinth was matched against colts and older horses for the first time in the Sussex Stakes and finished second to the Irish colt Thatch. Her final race was the Group Three Goodwood Mile (now the Celebration Mile) in August. She started 2/5 favourite and won easily from the colts Loyal Manzer and Gospill Hill.

== Assessment ==
In the 1972 Free Handicap, a rating of the best two-year-olds to race in Britain, Jacinth was the top-rated juvenile of either sex, three pounds ahead of the leading colt Noble Decree. The independent Timeform organisation concurred, making her the best two-year-old of either sex with a rating of 133. In their book, A Century of Champions, based on the Timeform rating system, John Randall and Tony Morris rated Jacinth the fourteenth-best two-year-old filly trained in Britain or Ireland in the 20th century.

== Stud record ==
Jacinth was retired to become a broodmare at Sir Kenneth Butt's Brook Stud at Cheveley near Newmarket. She produced several winners, but none at the highest level. She died in 1992 at the age of twenty-two.

Her winning progeny included:

- Roldolfo (bay colt, foaled 1977, sired by Habitat), won 1 race over five furlongs in Ireland during 1980
- Jacquinta (bay filly, foaled 8 April 1979, by Habitat), won 3 races and placed 3 times from 9 starts in Britain 1981–2, dam of the Prestige Stakes winner Jaffa Line
- Spinelle (chestnut filly, foaled 19 February 1981, by Great Nephew), won 1 race and placed once, 2nd G3 Oaks Trial S at Lingfield from 8 starts in Britain 1983-4
- Cornelian (bay filly, 1983, by Great Nephew), won 1 race and placed once from 6 starts in Britain during 1986
- Rubelite (grey filly, 1986, by Kalaglow), won 1 race and placed twice from 6 starts in Britain during 1989

== Pedigree ==
Pedigree of Jacinth (IRE), bay mare, 1970
Sire Red God (USA) 1954	Nasrullah (GB); 1940	Nearco	Pharos
Sire Red God (USA) 1954	Nasrullah (GB); 1940	Nearco	Nogara
Sire Red God (USA) 1954	Nasrullah (GB); 1940	Mumtaz Begum	Blenheim
Sire Red God (USA) 1954	Nasrullah (GB); 1940	Mumtaz Begum	Mumtaz Mahal
Sire Red God (USA) 1954	Spring Run (USA); 1948	Menow	Pharamond
Sire Red God (USA) 1954	Spring Run (USA); 1948	Menow	Alcibiades
Sire Red God (USA) 1954	Spring Run (USA); 1948	Boola Brook	Bull Dog
Sire Red God (USA) 1954	Spring Run (USA); 1948	Boola Brook	Brookdale
Dam Jaffa (GB) 1965	Right Royal (FR); 1958	Owen Tudor	Hyperion
Dam Jaffa (GB) 1965	Right Royal (FR); 1958	Owen Tudor	Mary Tudor
Dam Jaffa (GB) 1965	Right Royal (FR); 1958	Bastia	Victrix
Dam Jaffa (GB) 1965	Right Royal (FR); 1958	Bastia	Barberybush
Dam Jaffa (GB) 1965	Mistress Gwynne (GB); 1955	Chanteur	Chateau Bouscaut
Dam Jaffa (GB) 1965	Mistress Gwynne (GB); 1955	Chanteur	La Diva
Dam Jaffa (GB) 1965	Mistress Gwynne (GB); 1955	Daring Miss	Felicitation
Dam Jaffa (GB) 1965	Mistress Gwynne (GB); 1955	Daring Miss	Venturesome (Family: 21-a)
