= Château Rauzan =

Château Rauzan, Château Rausan or Château Rozan, is the name of an estate once the property of Pierre de Rauzan in Margaux and Pauillac, in the Bordeaux region of France, that became partitioned beginning at the end of the 18th century. The modern wine estates are:

In Margaux:

- Château Rauzan-Gassies
- Château Rauzan-Ségla
- Château Desmirail
- Château Marquis de Terme

In Pauillac:

- Château Pichon Longueville Baron
- Château Pichon Longueville Comtesse de Lalande
