= History of Bordeaux wine =

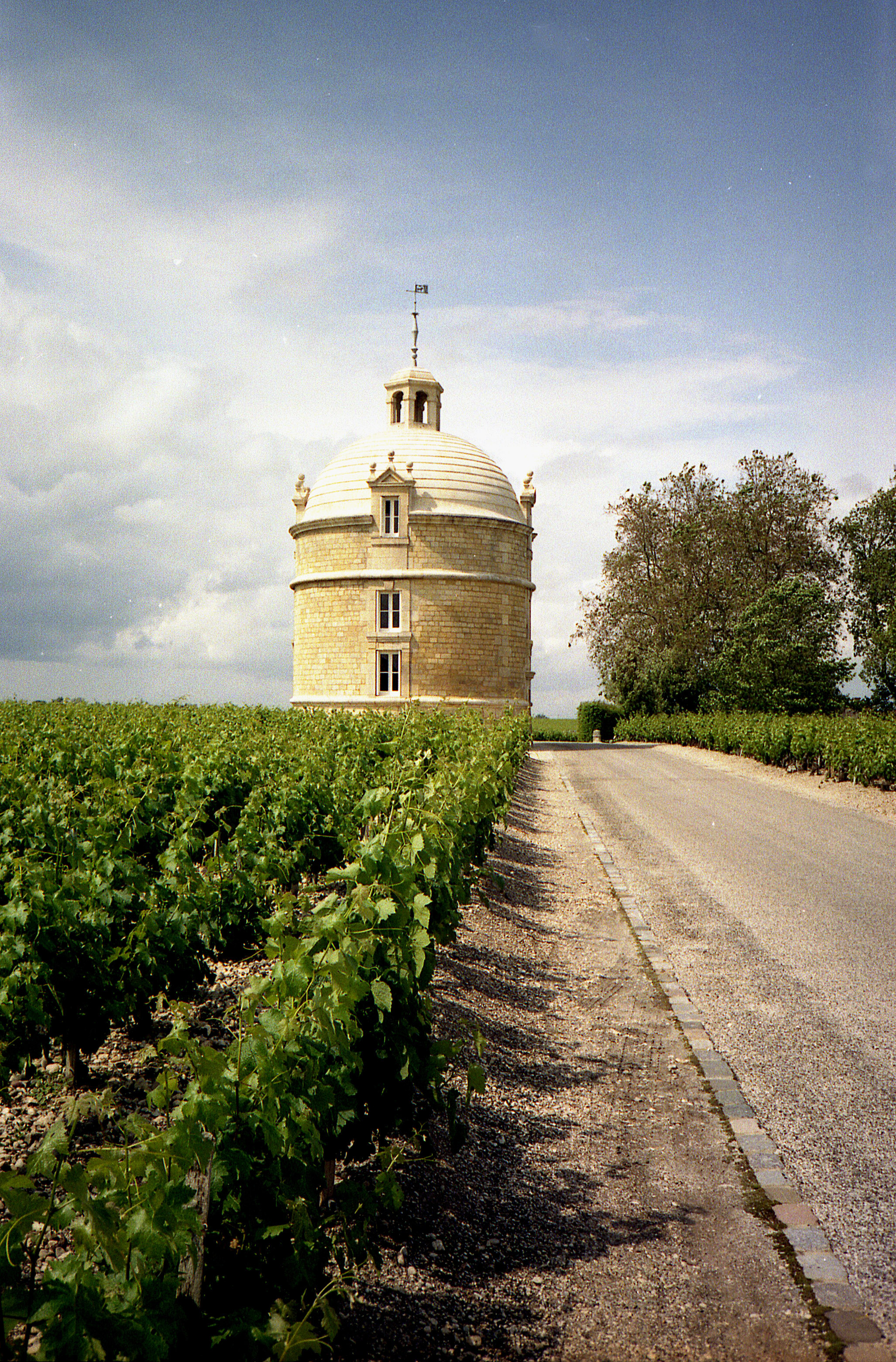
Château La Tour in Bordeaux

Bordeaux wine spans almost 2000 years to Roman times when the first vineyards were planted. In the Middle Ages, the marriage of Henry Plantagenet and Eleanor of Aquitaine opened the Bordeaux region to the English market and eventually to the world's stage. The Gironde estuary and its tributaries, the Garonne and the Dordogne rivers play a pivotal role in the history and success of this region.

== Roman times ==
Bordeaux wine production seems to have begun sometime after 43 AD, during the Roman occupation of Gaul, when the Romans established vineyards to cultivate wine for the soldiers. However, it is only in 71 AD that Pliny the Elder recorded the first real evidence of vineyards in Bordeaux. The area's location along the Gironde estuary provided an ideal trade route with the British Isles. Wine historian, Roger Dion, has theorized that the first vine cuttings that the Romans brought to Bordeaux originated in the Rioja region of Spain. The early budding of the Bordeaux wine industry suffered a number of disruptions following the fall of Rome. The area was occupied by Vandals in AD 408, Goths in 406, and Visigoths in 414. The area was also subjected to repeated encounters with Saxon longboats along the coast. These disruptions continued into the 5th century to the period of Frankish rule.

== Middle Ages ==
Although domestically popular, French wine was seldom exported, as the areas covered by vineyards and the volume of wine produced was low. In the 12th century however, the popularity of Bordeaux wines increased dramatically following the marriage of Henry Plantagenet and Aliénor d'Aquitaine. The marriage made the province of Aquitaine English territory, and thenceforth the majority of Bordeaux claret was exported in exchange for other goods. Upon the accession of their son, Richard, to the English throne Bordeaux became the base for Richard's French operations.

As the popularity of Bordeaux wine increased, the vineyards expanded to accommodate the demands from abroad. Henry and Aliénor's youngest son, John, was in favor of promoting the wine industry, and to increase it further, abolished the Grande Coutume export tax to England from the Aquitaine region. In the 13th and 14th century, a code of business practices called the police des vins emerged to give Bordeaux wine a distinct trade advantage over its neighboring regions.

The citizenry of Bordeaux worked diligently to promote and foster their relationship with the English market. In 1205, King Alfonso VIII of Castile laid claim to Aquitaine and put Bordeaux under siege. The village was able to withstand the attack and King John rewarded the Bourgeois with orders for wine in excess of 120 tons. In 1224, King Louis VIII of France attempted to purge the English from French soil and was halted in his advance in the town of Bordeaux. In the aftermath Bordeaux received privileged access to the English market through London, and their exports to the market soon dwarfed the production from other French wine making regions.

During the 13th century, the Graves was the principal wine region of Bordeaux. While there were some vines growing in the Entre-Deux-Mers, Saint-Émilion and Blaye, the Médoc during this period was virtually a barren marshland. At the turn of the 14th century, the town of Libourne was vying for dominance in the area, exporting 11,000 tons of wine to London from the 1308 vintage. A year earlier, this area fulfilled an order for 1,152,000 bottles to be used for the celebration of Edward II's wedding. The wine of this time period was highly alcoholic and fruity but did not age well, often spoiling a year after the vintage was released. The export of Bordeaux was effectively halted by the outbreak of the Hundred Years' War between France and England in 1337 followed by the outbreak of the Black Death which ravaged the area. By the end of the conflict in 1453 France had repossessed the province, thus taking control of wine production in the region.

As part of the Auld Alliance, Scots merchants were granted by the French a privileged position in the trade of claret, a position which continued largely unchanged with the cession of the military alliance between France and Scotland with the signing of the Treaty of Edinburgh. Even when the by then Protestant kingdoms of England and Scotland, both ruled by the same Stuart king by this point, were trying to militarily aid the Huguenot rebels in their fight against Catholic France in La Rochelle, Scots trading vessels were not only permitted to enter the Gironde, but they were escorted safely to the port of Bordeaux by the French navy for their own protection from Huguenot privateers.

== Second golden era ==
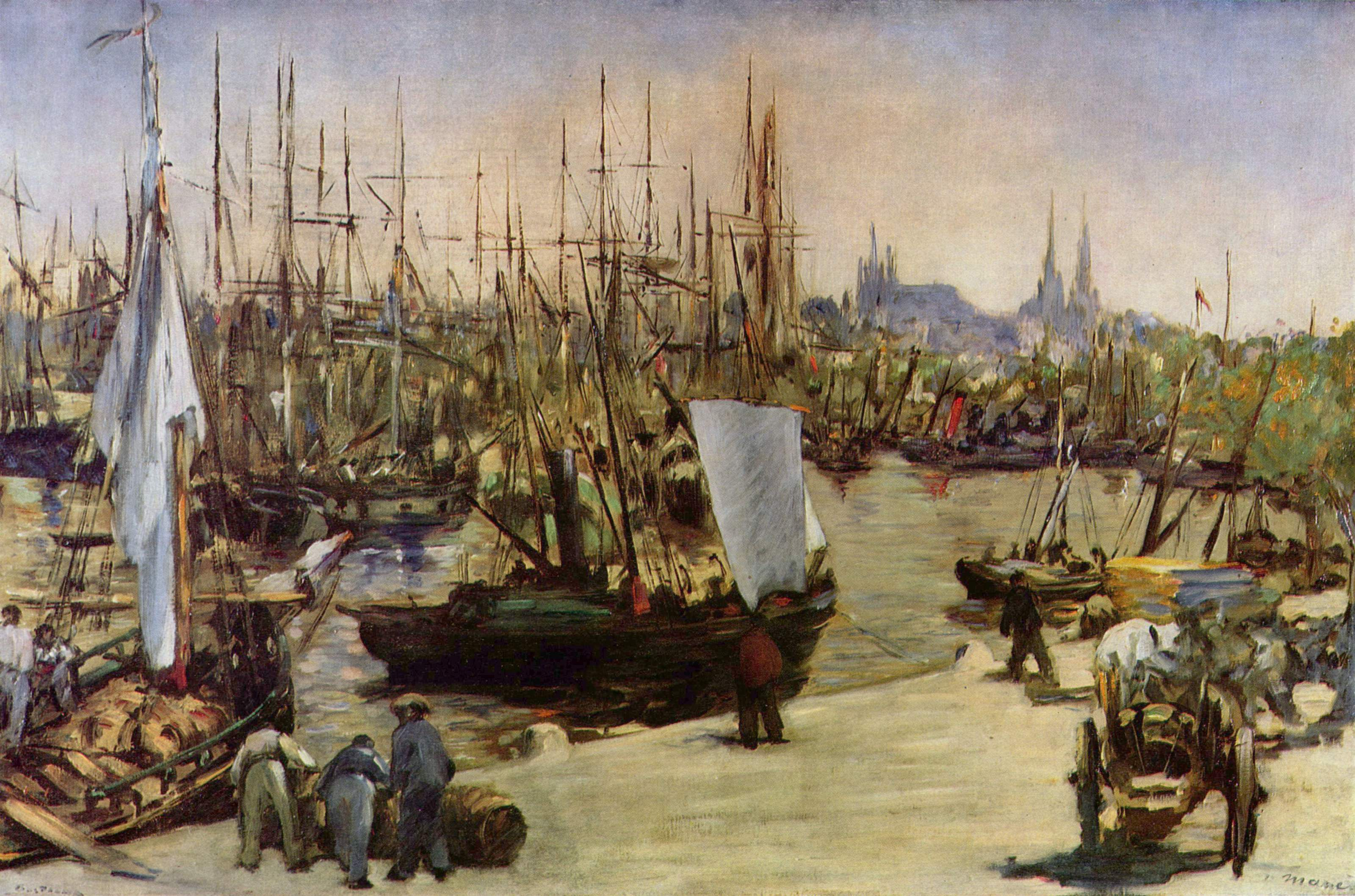
Harbour at Bordeaux, Édouard Manet, 1871

In the seventeenth century, Dutch traders began to drain the marshland around the Médoc and encouraged the planting of vineyards. The Dutch would also open new distribution channels to the Bourgeois which helped usher in a second era of prosperity. At the turn of the 18th century, the War of the Spanish Succession broke out which made navigation along the French coast line and the English Channel very risky. Additionally, the tensions between English and French governments halted all "official" trade between Bordeaux and the London market. Despite the government sanction, bottles of prized Bordeaux wines began showing up in large quantities at auction houses in London, Bristol, and Plymouth as the captured bounty of privateers. Wine historian, Hugh Johnson, speculates that this was an arranged affair between the Bordeaux chateaux, the privateers and the London auction houses to get around the war time politics of the period.

In 1725, the spread of vineyards throughout Bordeaux was so vast that it was divided into specific areas so that the consumer could tell exactly where each wine was from. The collection of districts was known as the Vignoble de Bordeaux, and bottles were labeled with both the region and the area from which they originated. During this period, Nicolas-Alexandre, marquis de Ségur rose to prominence as the "Prince of Vignes" due to his ownership of some of Bordeaux's most prestigious estates and Pierre de Rauzan laid the foundation for Château Rauzan-Ségla, Château Rauzan-Gassies, Château Pichon Longueville Baron, and Château Pichon Longueville Comtesse de Lalande.

In 1855, a classification system was set up that ranked the top chateaus of the Médoc according to their market price.

== Phylloxera epidemic ==
From 1875 to 1892 almost all Bordeaux vineyards were ruined by Phylloxera infestations. The region's wine industry was rescued by grafting native vines on to pest-resistant American rootstock from Augusta, Missouri, the first viticultural region in the United States. All Bordeaux vines that survive to this day are thanks to this action. Some grape varieties responded better to the grafting than others and these varieties—Cabernet Sauvignon, Cabernet franc, Merlot, Semillon, Sauvignon blanc and Muscadelle—became Bordeaux's leading grapes.

== Economic uncertainty ==
Due to the lucrative nature of this business, other areas in France began growing their own wines and labeling them as Bordeaux products. As profits in the Aquitaine region declined, the vignerons demanded that the government impose a law declaring that only produce from Bordeaux could be labeled with that name. The INAO or Institut National des Appellations d'Origine was created for this purpose.

In the twentieth century, the French wine market saw the effects of over cropping and the early developments of the wine lake phenomenon as supply far out paced demand. The two World Wars, Great Depression and 1970s oils crisis also had a detrimental effect on the industry.

== 20th century ==
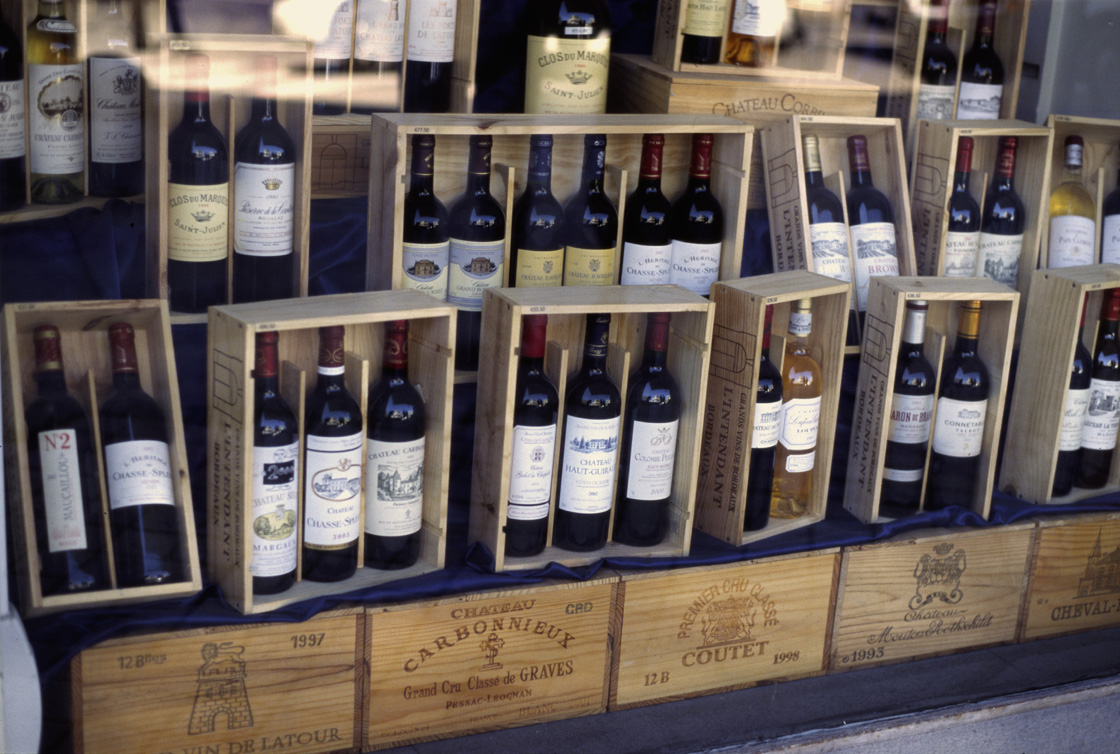
Bordeaux wine displayed for sale locally in France.

In 1936, the government responded to the appeals from the winemakers and stated that all regions in France had to name their wines by the place in which they had been produced. Labeled with the AOC approved stamp, products were officially confirmed to be from the region that it stated. This law later extended to other goods such as cheese, poultry and vegetables.

The economic problems in the 1970s, in the wake of the 1973 oil crisis marked a difficult period for Bordeaux. A series of scandals coincided with a commercial crisis in Bordeaux. The vintage of 1972 had been overpriced as was 1973 and 1974. And when the market crashed the négociants were stuck with overpriced wine that they could not sell. The early 1980s saw a new trend. Inheritance taxes were doubled in 1981 and on top of the crisis in the 1970s, many families found it increasingly difficult to hang on to their châteaux. Enter domestic and foreign insurance companies, banks and other corporate giants. Some of these companies were looking for a quick profit, others were in it as a long-term investment. But the 1980s decade wasn't all bad. It also saw more great vintages in a single decade than ever before and a new era in other respects. First, wine critics (rather than just official classifications) started to have an influence on demand and prices. Wine critic Robert M. Parker Jr. reviewed the 1982 Bordeaux vintage as the most sumptuous vintage in decades. This was a turning point for Bordeaux wine economically, and represented the beginning of an American domination of the reviewing of wine, especially Bordeaux. The result was a broader appeal of Bordeaux wine where the presence of fruit became a much more important factor than previously.

This critical selection of grapes also resulted in many chateaux introducing second wines, so not to waste good but not optimum quality grapes. It was also the introduction of the en primeur concept where traders alongside critics are invited to Bordeaux six months after harvest, to sample the new wine.

Bordeaux used to have a significant production of white wines, with Entre-deux-Mers, a primarily white wine area. Unlike the style of dry white Bordeaux favoured today, with almost 100% Sauvignon Blanc and a heavy influence of new oak, the traditional Entre-deux-Mers whites had a high proportion of Semillion and were made in either old oak barrels or steel tanks. Starting in the 1960s and 1970s, these vineyards were converted to red wine production (of Bordeaux AOC and Bordeaux Supérieur AOC), and the production of white wine has decreased ever since. Today production of white wine has shrunk to about one tenth of Bordeaux's total production, with 11.0% of the vineyard surface in 2007 used for white wines (7.8% for dry, 3.2% for sweet).
