= Kotashaan =

French-bred Thoroughbred racehorse

- Sire: Darshaan
- Grandsire: Shirley Heights
- Dam: Haute Autorite
- Damsire: Elocutionist
- Sex: Stallion
- Foaled: 1988
- Country: France
- Colour: Dark Bay/Brown
- Breeder: Wertheimer et Frère
- Owner: La Presle Farm
- Trainer: 1) Criquette Head-Maarek (France); 2) Richard E. Mandella (USA)
- Record: 22: 10-5-2
- Earnings: US$2,812,114

Major wins
- Prix Manitou III (1990); Prix de Courcelles (1991); Prix La Force (1991); San Juan Capistrano Invitational Handicap (1993); Eddie Read Handicap (1993); San Luis Rey Handicap (1993); San Luis Obispo Handicap (1993); Oak Tree Invitational Stakes (1993) Breeders' Cup wins: Breeders' Cup Turf (1993)

Awards
- American Champion Male Turf Horse (1993); American Horse of the Year (1993)
- Last updated on May 1, 2010

Kotashaan (foaled May 4, 1988 in Orne, France) was a Thoroughbred racehorse who competed in France and earned Champion honors in the United States.

== Background ==
He was bred and raced by brothers Alain and Gérard Wertheimer, owners of the House of Chanel in Paris. Kotashaan was sired by Darshaan, winner of the 1984 French Derby and the Leading sire in France in 2003. His dam was Haute Authorite, a daughter of the American runner Elocutionist who in 1976 won the second leg of the U.S. Triple Crown series, the Preakness Stakes.

== Racing career ==
=== France ===
Trained by Criquette Head-Maarek, the world's most successful female trainer, Kotashann made his racing debut on November 16, 1990. He finished second in a maiden race at Saint-Cloud Racecourse then two weeks later got his first win at Maisons-Laffitte Racecourse. At age three in 1991, he debuted in April with a fifth-place finish in the Prix Noailles then won his next two starts, capturing the listed Prix de Courcelles and the Group 3 Prix La Force. Kotashann contested his first Group One race on June 23, 1991, finishing third to Subotica in the Grand Prix de Paris. He followed this up with another third-place effort in the August 15th G2 Prix Guillaume d'Ornano and a second-place finish on September 9 in the G3 La Coupe de Maisons-Laffitte.

=== United States ===
The Wertheimer brothers decided to send Kotashaan to compete in turf races in the United States, where they raced their horses under the name of La Presle Farm. Under California trainer Richard Mandella, he was limited by an injury and made just four starts in 1992, winning only one minor race. In top form in 1993, though, Kotashaan won six of ten starts with three runner-up finishes, and earned more than US$2.6 million. He did lose three races to top turf horse Star of Cozzene in late 1992 and early 1993. He won five major California races at distances from 1 1/8 to 1 3/4 miles (1.8 to 2.8 km) including the San Juan Capistrano Handicap in track-record time. He then capped it off with a win in the November 6, 1993, Breeders' Cup Turf at Santa Anita Park. In the Turf, Kotashaan defeated a strong field that included runner-up Bien Bien, defending Breeders' Cup Turf champion, Fraise (4), Hatoof (5), King George VI and Queen Elizabeth Stakes winner, Opera House (6), and French Derby winner, Hernando (10).

Following his Breeders' Cup win, Kotashaan was sold to a Japanese syndicate. For his new owners, he made his final start of 1993, and of his racing career, in the November 28 Japan Cup. Ridden by his regular American jockey, Kent Desormeaux, Kotashaan finished second to Legacy World after Desormeaux misjudged the finish line.

== Honors ==
Kotashaan's 1993 performances earned him the Eclipse Award for American Champion Male Turf Horse, plus the highest honor in United States' Thoroughbred racing, American Horse of the Year.

== Stud record ==
Retired to stud duty, he stood in Japan until 2000 when Andrew (Willy) Murphy purchased him and brought him to stand at Ballycurragh Stud in Rathoe, County Carlow, Ireland. He has had little success as a sire.

Pedigree of Kotashaan
Sire Darshaan	Shirley Heights	Mill Reef	Never Bend
Sire Darshaan	Shirley Heights	Mill Reef	Milan Mill
Sire Darshaan	Shirley Heights	Hardiemma	Hardicanute
Sire Darshaan	Shirley Heights	Hardiemma	Grand Cross
Sire Darshaan	Delsy	Abdos	Arbar
Sire Darshaan	Delsy	Abdos	Pretty Lady
Sire Darshaan	Delsy	Kelty	Venture
Sire Darshaan	Delsy	Kelty	Marilla
Dam Haute Autorite	Elocutionist	Gallant Romeo	Gallant Man
Dam Haute Autorite	Elocutionist	Gallant Romeo	Juliet's Nurse
Dam Haute Autorite	Elocutionist	Strickly Speaking	Fleet Nasrullah
Dam Haute Autorite	Elocutionist	Strickly Speaking	Believe Me
Dam Haute Autorite	Premiere Danseuse	Green Dancer	Nijinsky
Dam Haute Autorite	Premiere Danseuse	Green Dancer	Green Valley
Dam Haute Autorite	Premiere Danseuse	Opalia	Cambremont
Dam Haute Autorite	Premiere Danseuse	Opalia	Optimistic
