= Prix La Force =

Flat horse race in France

- Class: Group 3
- Location: Longchamp Racecourse; Paris, France
- Inaugurated: 1910
- Race type: Flat / Thoroughbred
- Website: france-galop.com

Race information
- Distance: 2,000 metres (1¼ miles)
- Surface: Turf
- Track: Right-handed
- Qualification: Three-year-old colts and geldings
- Weight: 58 kg
- Purse: €80,000 (2019); 1st: €40,000

Prix La Force
2025
| Cualificar | Azimpour | New Ground |

Previous years
2024
Atlast | Mondo Man | First Look
2023
Big Rock | Padishakh | Greenland
2022
Mister Saint Paul | Dreamflight | Valmer Magic
2021
Adhamo | Erasmo | Darkness

2020-2011
2020
Pao Alto | Ocean Atlantique | Chachnak
2018
Chilean | Study Of Man | Sarri
2017
Graphite | Phelps Win | Franz Schubert
2016
Cloth Of Stars | Viserano | Ghaaly
2015
Silverwave | Epicuris | Medrano
2014
Gailo Chop | Free Port Lux | Mr Pommeroy
2013
Triple Threat | Sefri | Ivan Grozny
2012
Saonois | Saint Loup | Double Glory
2011
Baraan | Prairie Star | Pour Moi

2010-2001
2010
Simon De Montfort | Pain Perdu | Circumvent
2009
On Est Bien | Topclas | Black Bear Island
2008
High Rock | Salsalavie | Watar
2007
Literato | Chinese Whisper | Friston Forest
2006
Barastraight | Echoes Rock | Irish Wells
2005
Kendor Dine | Helios Quercus | Biens Nanti
2004
Delfos | Young Tiger | Kurm
2003
Vespone | Kiddy Sing | Kalabar
2002
River Dancer | Le Fou | Martaline
2001
Art Contemporain | Cap Amiral | Cybergenic

2000-1990
2000
Holding Court | Bonnet Rouge | Herculano
1999
Nowhere To Exit | First Magnitude | Magic Whisper
1998
Dream Well | Epistolaire | Vezing
1997
Magellano | Six Zero | With Fire
1996
Radevore | Top Glory | Henry The Fifth
1995
Tzar Rodney | Copent Garden | Farenvaros
1994
Percutant | Dare And Go | Norton Sound
1993
Sin Kiang | Irish Prospector | Sismart
1992
Break Bread | Standiford | Polytain
1991
Kotashaan | Funny Baby | John Balliol
1990
Sifting Gold | Starstreak | Elytis

The Prix La Force is a Group 3 flat horse race in France open to three-year-old thoroughbreds. It is run over a distance of 2,000 metres (about 1¼ miles) at Longchamp in April.

== History ==
The event is named in memory of the Duc de La Force, Bertrand Nompar de Caumont (1840–1909), a member of the Société d'Encouragement. It was established in 1910, and was initially open to horses aged three or four. Its original distance was 2,200 metres. It was later opened to older horses.

The Prix La Force was restricted to three-year-olds in 1950. From this point it was contested over 2,000 metres. For brief spells thereafter it was run over 2,200 metres (1956–58), 2,000 metres (1959–60), 2,400 metres (1961–63) and 2,600 metres (1964–65). It reverted to 2,000 metres in 1966.

The race was staged at Chantilly in 1995 and Deauville in 1996. It was run over 2,400 metres at Longchamp from 1997 to 2000. It was subsequently contested over 2,000 metres at Chantilly (2001–02) and Saint-Cloud (2003–04).

The event returned to Longchamp in 2005. It was temporarily increased to 2,100 metres in 2011. It was closed to fillies from the 2017 running.

The Prix La Force can serve as a trial for the Prix du Jockey Club. The last horse to win both races was Saonois in 2012.

== Records ==
Leading jockey since 1950 (7 wins):

- Freddy Head – Cadmus (1966), Mazarin (1969), Orante (1975), Fabulous Dancer (1979), Truculent (1984), Louis Le Grand (1985), Val des Bois (1989)

Leading trainer since 1950 (9 wins):

- André Fabre – Al Nasr (1981), Sifting Gold (1990), Radevore (1996), Magellano (1997), Simon de Montfort (2010), Triple Threat (2013), Cloth Of Stars (2016), Graphite (2017), Cualificar (2025)

Leading owner since 1950 (4 wins):

- Jacques Wertheimer – Orante (1975), Truculent (1984), Val des Bois (1989), Kotashaan (1991)
- Wertheimer et Frère - Shaman (2019), Pao Alto (2020), Adhamo (2021), Atlast (2024)
- Godolphin SNC - Simon de Montfort (2010), Cloth Of Stars (2016), Graphite (2017), Cualificar (2025)

== Winners since 1978 ==
| Year | Winner | Jockey | Trainer | Owner | Time |
|---|---|---|---|---|---|
| 1978 | Dom Racine | Alain Badel | Olivier Douieb | Robert Sangster | 2:17.60 |
| 1979 | Fabulous Dancer | Freddy Head | Criquette Head | Ghislaine Head | 2:08.20 |
| 1980 | Nemr | Alfred Gibert | Mitri Saliba | Mahmoud Fustok |
| 1981 | Al Nasr | Alfred Gibert | André Fabre | Moufid Dabaghi |
| 1982 | Be My Native | Bruce Raymond | Robert Armstrong | K. Hsu |
| 1983 | White Spade | Lester Piggott | David Smaga | Sylvain Benillouche |
| 1984 | Truculent | Freddy Head | Criquette Head | Jacques Wertheimer |
| 1985 | Louis Le Grand | Freddy Head | Criquette Head | Khalid Abdullah |
| 1986 | Loyal Double | Gérald Mossé | Patrick Biancone | J. T. Lundy |
| 1987 | The Scout | Gary W. Moore | Criquette Head | Khalid Abdullah |
| 1988 | Welkin | Cash Asmussen | Corine Barande-Barbe | Alfred Cuddy | 2:07.90 |
| 1989 | Val des Bois | Freddy Head | Criquette Head | Jacques Wertheimer | 2:14.00 |
| 1990 | Sifting Gold | Cash Asmussen | André Fabre | Roy Strudwick | 2:03.10 |
| 1991 | Kotashaan | Guy Guignard | Criquette Head | Jacques Wertheimer | 2:06.50 |
| 1992 | Break Bread | Cash Asmussen | David Smaga | Lord Weinstock | 2:06.50 |
| 1993 | Sin Kiang | Cash Asmussen | Jean de Roualle | Sir James Goldsmith | 2:12.90 |
| 1994 | Percutant | Guy Guignard | David Smaga | Thierry van Zuylen | 2:10.40 |
| 1995 | Tzar Rodney | Olivier Peslier | Georges Doleuze | William Trichter | 2:12.50 |
| 1996 | Radevore | Thierry Jarnet | André Fabre | Khalid Abdullah | 2:07.70 |
| 1997 | Magellano | Olivier Peslier | André Fabre | Sultan Al Kabeer | 2:44.10 |
| 1998 | Dream Well | Cash Asmussen | Pascal Bary | Niarchos Family | 2:31.00 |
| 1999 | Nowhere to Exit | Richard Quinn | John Dunlop | Gary Pinchen | 2:47.30 |
| 2000 | Holding Court | Olivier Peslier | Michael Jarvis | John Good | 2:34.90 |
| 2001 | Art Contemporain | Thierry Jarnet | Jean-Claude Rouget | Jean-Louis Tepper | 2:11.10 |
| 2002 | Diaghilev (Note: The 2002 winner Diaghilev was later exported to Hong Kong and renamed River Dancer) | Jamie Spencer | Aidan O'Brien | Tabor / Magnier | 2:07.80 |
| 2003 | Vespone | Christophe Lemaire | Nicolas Clément | Ecurie Mister Ess A S | 2:15.40 |
| 2004 | Delfos | Olivier Peslier | Carlos Laffon-Parias | Leonidas Marinopoulos | 2:08.40 |
| 2005 | Kendor Dine | Stéphane Pasquier | Yves de Nicolay | Didier Kahn | 2:14.20 |
| 2006 | Barastraight | Ioritz Mendizabal | Jean-Claude Rouget | Serge Boucheron | 2:04.40 |
| 2007 | Literato | Christophe Lemaire | Jean-Claude Rouget | Hervé Morin | 2:04.80 |
| 2008 | High Rock | Christophe Lemaire | Jean-Claude Rouget | Robert Bousquet | 2:12.90 |
| 2009 | On Est Bien | Anthony Crastus | Élie Lellouche | Dominique Lellouche | 2:09.56 |
| 2010 | Simon de Montfort | Mickael Barzalona | André Fabre | Godolphin | 2:07.12 |
| 2011 | Baraan | Christophe Lemaire | Jean-Claude Rouget | HH Aga Khan IV | 2:15.30 |
| 2012 | Saonois | Antoine Hamelin | Jean-Pierre Gauvin | Pascal Treyve | 2:04.65 |
| 2013 | Triple Threat | Maxime Guyon | André Fabre | Team Valor | 2:04.16 |
| 2014 | Gailo Chop | Julien Augé | Antoine de Watrigant | Alain Chopard | 2:02.96 |
| 2015 | Silverwave | Adrien Fouassier | Alain Couetil | Hspirit | 2:09.57 |
| 2016 | Cloth of Stars (Note: The 2016 race took place at Saint-Cloud while Longchamp was closed for redevelopment) | Mickael Barzalona | André Fabre | Godolphin | 2:17.91 |
| 2017 | Graphite (Note: The 2017 race took place at Chantilly over 1,800m (1m 1f) while Longchamp was closed for redevelopment) | Pierre-Charles Boudot | André Fabre | Godolphin | 1:48.27 |
| 2018 | Chilean | Oisin Murphy | Martyn Meade | Manton Estate Racing | 2:01.95 |
| 2019 | Shaman | Maxime Guyon | Carlos Laffon-Parias | Wertheimer et Frère | 1:50.24 |
| 2020 | Pao Alto | Maxime Guyon | Christophe Ferland | Wertheimer et Frère | 1:51.49 |
| 2021 | Adhamo | Maxime Guyon | Freddy Head | Wertheimer et Frère | 2:00.10 |
| 2022 | Mister Saint Paul | Theo Bachelot | Etienne Leenders | Ecurie Bernd & Torsten Raber, Luc Josse Et A | 1:59.54 |
| 2023 | Big Rock | Aurélien Lemaitre | Christopher Head | Yeguada Centurion SL | 1:49.63 |
| 2024 | Atlast | Maxime Guyon | Christophe Ferland | Wertheimer et Frère | 2:05.13 |
| 2025 | Cualificar | Alexis Pouchin | André Fabre | Godolphin | 1:50.02 |
| 2026 | Segall | Marvin Grandin | André Fabre | Ecurie David R Layani Family | 1:53.66 |

== Earlier winners ==
- 1910: Oversight
- 1911: Matchless
- 1912: Basse Pointe
- 1913: Amadou
- 1914: Ecouen
- 1919: Le Dragon
- 1920: Cid Campeador
- 1921: Sourbier
- 1922: Zagreus
- 1923: Saint Hubert
- 1924: Premontre
- 1925: Cadum
- 1926: Ptolemy
- 1927: Javelot
- 1928: Rialto
- 1929: Bubbles
- 1931: Roi de Trefle
- 1932: Filarete
- 1936: Quai d'Orsay
- 1937: Gonfalonier
- 1941: Manjano
- 1942: Pampre d'Or
- 1943: Escamillo
- 1950: Alizier
- 1951: Minoutchehr
- 1952: Aram
- 1953: Semillant
- 1954: Malatesta
- 1955:
- 1956: Fastfol
- 1957: Flush Royal II
- 1958: Currito
- 1959: Colisee / Simono *
- 1960: Puissant Chef
- 1961: Okay II
- 1962:
- 1963:
- 1964: Silfric
- 1965: Principino
- 1966: Cadmus
- 1967: Topyo
- 1968: Abgal
- 1969: Mazarin
- 1970: Sassafras
- 1971: Millenium
- 1972: Sanur
- 1973: Verkade
- 1974: Un Kopeck
- 1975: Orante
- 1976: Malacate
- 1977: Olantengy

* The 1959 race was a dead-heat and has joint winners.

== See also ==
- List of French flat horse races
