= Wertheimer et Frère =

Wertheimer et Frère is a Thoroughbred horse racing and breeding business partnership between brothers Alain and Gérard Wertheimer of France. The Wertheimer brothers are the owners of the House of Chanel in Paris. They inherited that company and the horse racing business from their father Jacques who had inherited a racing stable from his parents Pierre and Germaine Wertheimer. The brothers operate as La Presle Farm and/or Wertheimer Farm in the United States and in France as Wertheimer et Frère where they have won numerous important Conditions races. Alec Head trained for the family in Europe until his retirement in 1984 but for a number of years continued to act as their bloodstock advisor. Head's daughter Christiane "Criquette" Head took over as trainer in 1983 and continued to have great success until they ended their working relationship in 2006 when brother Freddy Head took over. In the United States, the Wertheimer brothers won the 1993 Breeders' Cup Turf and earned American Horse of the Year honors with Kotashaan. In 2003, they won the Breeders' Cup Juvenile Fillies with Halfbridled. Both horses were trained by Richard Mandella. In 2008, 2009, and 2010, their filly Goldikova won the TVG Breeders' Cup Mile, becoming the only horse to ever win a Breeders' Cup event three times. In 2011, Goldikova competed in the event for a fourth consecutive year, finishing 3rd.

== Racing background ==
Their interest in racing goes back two generations in a family which has been responsible for the development of a number of top stallions, including Lyphard, Riverman and Green Dancer. Alain and Gerard's grandfather, Pierre, was a bastion of the European turf, winning English classics such as the 1956 Epsom Derby. His death in 1965 saw the famous blue and white silks passed on to his widow, who was France's leading owner in 1972, and when she died in 1974, on again to Jacques. Jacques Wertheimer was champion owner in his first full season, sweeping the 1975 Poule d'Essai des Pouliches, 2,000 Guineas and Prix du Jockey-Club with Ivanjica, Green Dancer and Val de L’Orne. Ivanjica went on to win the 1976 Prix de L’Arc de Triomphe, an event which fell to Wertheimer again in 1981, courtesy of another filly, Gold River, who had won the Prix Royal Oak the previous year.

Notable Horses:

- Breeders' Cup Turf : Kotashaan (1993)
- Critérium de Saint-Cloud : Special Quest (1997), Goldamix (2000)
- Prix du Jockey Club : Intello (2013)
- Prix Marcel Boussac : Juvenia (1998)
- Prix Saint-Alary : Fidélité (2003)
- Breeders' Cup Juvenile Fillies :Halfbridled (2003)
- Breeders' Cup Mile : Goldikova (2008, 2009, 2010)
- Prix Rothschild : Goldikova (2008, 2009, 2010, 2011)
- Prix de l'Arc de Triomphe : Solemia (2012)
- Dubai Turf : Solow (2015)
