= Pichon Longueville =

Pichon Longueville, the archaic name of a Bordeaux wine producer refers in present-day to:

- Château Pichon Longueville Baron, or Pichon Baron
- Château Pichon Longueville Comtesse de Lalande or Pichon Comtesse, or Pichon Lalande
