= Gold Splash =

American-bred Thoroughbred racehorse

- Sire: Blushing Groom
- Grandsire: Red God
- Dam: Rivere d'Or
- Damsire: Lyphard
- Sex: Mare
- Foaled: 23 January 1990
- Country: United States
- Colour: Chestnut
- Breeder: Wertheimer et Frère
- Owner: Jacques Wertheimer
- Trainer: Criquette Head; Richard Mandella
- Record: 13: 3-2-2
- Earnings: $471,884

Major wins
- Prix Marcel Boussac (1992); Coronation Stakes (1993); Osunitas Handicap (1994)

Gold Splash (foaled 23 January 1990) was an American-bred, French-trained Thoroughbred racehorse and broodmare. She was one of the best two-year-old fillies of her generation in France when she won the Prix Marcel Boussac on her third appearance. In the following season she finished third in the Poule d'Essai des Pouliches before winning the Coronation Stakes at Royal Ascot. She raced in the United States as a four-year-old, winning the Osunitas Handicap before being retired. Gold Splash was not a success as a broodmare, producing only two minor winners.

== Background ==
Gold Splash was a small chestnut mare bred in Kentucky by Alan and Gerard Wertheimer. During her racing career she was owned by Alan and Gerard's father Jacques Wertheimer. She was sired by Blushing Groom, who won the Grand Critérium in 1976 and the Poule d'Essai des Poulains in 1977 before becoming a very successful breeding stallion. His progeny included Arazi, Blushing John, Nashwan, Rahy, Rainbow Quest and Snow Bride.

Gold Splash's dam, Riviere d'Or was a top-class performer who won the Prix Saint-Alary in 1988, and was a daughter of the outstanding racemare Gold River, the winner of the 1981 Prix de l'Arc de Triomphe. A year after foaling Gold Splash, Riviere d'Or produced Born Gold, the dam of Goldikova.

Gold Splash was initially sent into training with Criquette Head at Chantilly.

== Racing career ==
=== 1992: two-year-old season ===
Gold Splash began her racing her career in the listed Prix Yacowlef over 1200 metres at Deauville Racecourse on 1 August and finished second by a short neck to Wixon, with Lit de Justice (later to win the Breeders' Cup Sprint) in fourth. After finishing fourth to Dancienne at Maisons-Laffitte Racecourse in September the filly was moved up to the highest class for the Group One Prix Marcel Boussac over 1600 metres on soft ground at Longchamp Racecourse on 4 October. Her ten opponents included Kindergarten (Prix d'Aumale), Cox Orange (Prix du Calvados), the British challengers Marillette (May Hill Stakes) and Love of Silver (Prestige Stakes) and the Italian-trained Secrage (Prix de Cabourg). Ridden by Gerald Mosse she raced in second place before taking the lead in the straight and held off the late challenge of Kindergarten to win by a short neck, with Love of Silver three-quarters of a length away in third.

=== 1993: three-year-old season ===
On her first appearance as a three-year-old Gold Splash finished second to the André Fabre-trained favourite Baya in the roup Three Prix de la Grotte over 1600 metres at Longchamp on 15 April. A month later she started 3.7/1 second favourite behind Baya for the Poule d'Essai des Pouliches over the same course and distance. Ridden as in her previous race by Olivier Doleuze she took the lead 400 metres from the finish and in a closely contested four-way struggle she finished third behind Madeleine's Dream and Ski Paradise, just ahead of Baya in fourth.

Mosse regained the ride when Gold Splash was sent to England to contest the 144th renewal of the Coronation Stakes at Royal Ascot on 16 June. She was made the 100/30 second favourite behind Nicer, the Geoff Wragg-trained winner of the Irish 1000 Guineas. The other three runners were the André Fabre-trained Elizabeth Bay (winner of the Prix Eclipse), Sumoto (winner of her only previous race) and Zarani Sidi Anna (runner-up in the Nell Gwyn Stakes). Gold Splash tracked the leader Zarani Sidi Anna before taking the lead entering the final furlong. She held off a challenge from Elizabeth Bay to win by a neck, with Zarani Sidi Anna finishing three quarters of a length away in third. After the race Criuette Head paid tribute to her father Alec Head who had won the race twice in the 1950s saying "It's a shame papa is not here, I could not have had a better teacher" and said of Gold Splash "She's a small filly but she's got a heart as big as this", reportedly spreading her hands "wide enough to accommodate a volleyball".

On her next appearance, Gold Splash was matched against colts and older horses in the Prix Jacques Le Marois at Deauville in August and finished fifth behind Sayyedati, Ski Paradise, Kingmambo and Elizabeth Bay. In September she finished sixth behind Kingmambo in the Prix du Moulin at Longchamp. In October, Gold Splash was dropped in class and started favourite for the Group Two Prix du Rond Point at Longchamp. After turning into the straight in third place she faded to finish eighth of the ten runners behind the four-year-old colt Voleris.

=== 1994: four-year-old season ===
In 1994, Gold Splash was transferred to the United States where she was trained by Richard Mandella. On her American debut she dead-heated for third place in the Convenience Handicap at Hollywood Park on 21 May. After a three-month break she returned for the Osunitas Handicap at Del Mar, in which she carried top weight of 121 pounds against five opponents. Ridden by Corey Nakatani, she came from last place approaching the final turn to take the lead in the straight and won by three quarters of a length from Queens Court Queen. In her two remaining starts she finished fourth behind Skimble at Louisiana Downs in September and fourth again behind the same mare in the Grade II Dahlia Handicap at Hollywood Park in December.

== Breeding record ==
After her retirement from racing, Gold Splash became a broodmare for Wertheimer & Frere. She produced at least six foals and two minor winners between 1996 and 2005:

- Ziggy Gold, a bay colt, sired in 1996, sired by Danzig. Failed to win in ten races.
- Gold Sphinx, bay colt, 1999, by Storm Cat. Won two races.
- Splash Cat, bay or brown colt, 2000, by Storm Cat. Failed to win in two races.
- Wildsplash, bay filly, 2002, by Deputy Minister. Unraced.
- Red Splash, colt, 2004, by Royal Academy. Failed to win in five races.
- Royal God (USA), bay colt (later gelded), 2005, by Royal Academy. Won three races.

== Pedigree ==
Pedigree of Gold Splash (USA), chestnut mare 1990
Sire Blushing Groom (FR) 1974	Red God (USA); 1954	Nasrullah	Nearco
Sire Blushing Groom (FR) 1974	Red God (USA); 1954	Nasrullah	Mumtaz Begum
Sire Blushing Groom (FR) 1974	Red God (USA); 1954	Spring Run	Menow
Sire Blushing Groom (FR) 1974	Red God (USA); 1954	Spring Run	Boola Brook
Sire Blushing Groom (FR) 1974	Runaway Bride (GB); 1962	Wild Risk	Rialto
Sire Blushing Groom (FR) 1974	Runaway Bride (GB); 1962	Wild Risk	Wild Violet
Sire Blushing Groom (FR) 1974	Runaway Bride (GB); 1962	Aimee	Tudor Minstrel
Sire Blushing Groom (FR) 1974	Runaway Bride (GB); 1962	Aimee	Emali
Dam Riviere d'Or (USA) 1985	Lyphard (USA); 1969	Northern Dancer	Nearctic
Dam Riviere d'Or (USA) 1985	Lyphard (USA); 1969	Northern Dancer	Natalma
Dam Riviere d'Or (USA) 1985	Lyphard (USA); 1969	Goofed	Court Martial
Dam Riviere d'Or (USA) 1985	Lyphard (USA); 1969	Goofed	Barra
Dam Riviere d'Or (USA) 1985	Gold River (FR); 1977	Riverman	Never Bend
Dam Riviere d'Or (USA) 1985	Gold River (FR); 1977	Riverman	River Lady
Dam Riviere d'Or (USA) 1985	Gold River (FR); 1977	Glaneuse	Snob
Dam Riviere d'Or (USA) 1985	Gold River (FR); 1977	Glaneuse	Glamour (Family: 22-d)
