= 1981 Prix de l'Arc de Triomphe =

60th Prix de l'Arc de Triomphe horse race

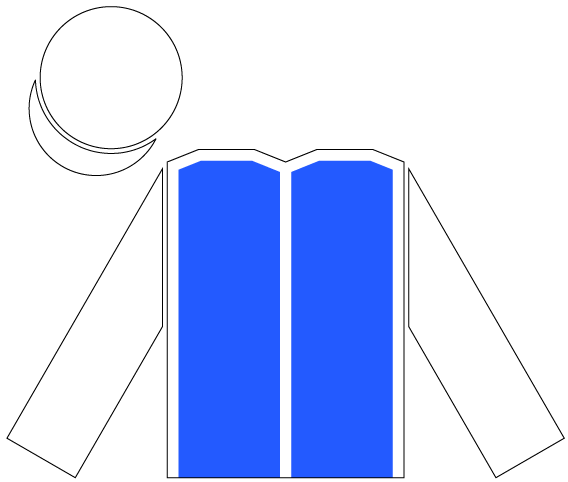
- Racing silks of Jacques Wertheimer
- Location: Longchamp Racecourse
- Date: October 4, 1981

The 1981 Prix de l'Arc de Triomphe was a horse race held at Longchamp on Sunday 4 October 1981. It was the 60th running of the Prix de l'Arc de Triomphe.

The winner was Gold River, a four-year-old filly trained in France by Alec Head and ridden by Gary Moore. The filly won by three quarters of a length and a nose from Bikala and April Run in a time of 2:35.2.

== Race details ==
- Sponsor: none
- Purse:
- Going: Dead
- Distance: 2,400 metres
- Number of runners: 24
- Winner's time: 2:35.2

== Full result ==
Pos.	Marg.	Horse	Age	Jockey	Trainer (Country)
1		Gold River	4	Gary Moore	Alec Head (FR)
2	¾	Bikala	3	Serge Gorli	Patrick Biancone (FR)
3	ns	April Run	3	Philippe Paquet	François Boutin (FR)
4	2	Perrault	4	Henri Samani	Pierre Pelat (FR)
5	2	Ardross	5	Lester Piggott	Henry Cecil (GB)
6	1½	Argument	4	Philip Waldron	Maurice Zilber (FR)
7	¾	Akarad	3	Yves Saint-Martin	François Mathet (FR)
8	3	Tootens	3	Georges Doleuze	E Bartholomew (FR)
9	hd	Leandra	3	Gerard Dubroeucq	Pierre Pelat (FR)
10	snk	Snow Day	3	Alfred Gibert	François Boutin (FR)
11	snk	Kings Lake	3	Pat Eddery	Vincent O'Brien (IRE)
12	5	Lancastrian	4	Maurice Philipperon	David Smaga (FR)
13	1½	Prince Bee	4	Joe Mercer	Dick Hern (GB)
14	hd	Cut Above	3	Brian Taylor	Dick Hern (GB)
15	nk	Blue Wind	3	Wally Swinburn	Dermot Weld (IRE)
16	2	Gap of Dunloe	3	Walter Swinburn	Patrick Biancone (FR)
17	1½	Pelerin	4	Edward Hide	Harry Wragg (GB)
18	2½	Condessa	3	Declan Gillespie	Jim Bolger (IRE)
19	shd	Rahotep	3	J-L Kessas	Bernard Secly (FR)
20	3	Detroit	4	Freddy Head	Olivier Douieb (FR)
21		Ring the Bell	4	N Tiley	H Westbrook
22		Gilded Vanity	4	Gabriel Curran	P Russell (IRE)
23		Beldale Flutter	3	Tony Murray	Michael Jarvis (GB)
24		Action Man	6	O Larsen	(DEN)

* Abbreviations: shd = short-head; nk = neck

== Winner's details ==
Further details of the winner, Detroit.

- Sex: Filly
- Foaled: 11 January 1977
- Country: France
- Sire: Riverman; Dam: Glaneuse (Snob)
- Owner: Jacques Wertheimer
- Breeder: Jacques Wertheimer
