= Gérard Wertheimer =

French businessman and billionaire (born 1951)

- Born: Gérard Paul Philippe Wertheimer; 17 April 1951 (age 75); Paris, France
- Education: University of Paris
- Known for: Co-owner of Chanel
- Spouse: Valérie Picavet
- Children: 2
- Relatives: Alain Wertheimer (brother); Charles Heilbronn (half-brother); Pierre Wertheimer (grandfather)

Gérard Paul Philippe Wertheimer (born 17 April 1951) is a French billionaire businessman based in New York City and Geneva, who owns Chanel in partnership with his brother, Alain. As of October 2022, Wertheimer's net worth was estimated at US$40 billion by Bloomberg Billionaires Index, making him the 27th richest person in the world.

According to Forbes, Wertheimer is the 38th richest individual in the world. As of 25 December 2024, his estimated net worth is US$41.4 billion.

== Early life ==
Wertheimer was born to a Jewish family, the son of Jacques Wertheimer and Eliane Fischer. His grandfather, Pierre, co-founded Chanel with Coco Chanel.

== Career ==
The company is run by Alain Wertheimer who has presided over the acquisition of several non-Chanel brands, including Eres Lingerie, Tanner Krolle saddles and leather goods, and Holland & Holland, a British gunsmith. Based in France, the Wertheimer brothers own French vineyards including Château Rauzan-Ségla in Margaux and Château Canon in Saint-Emilion, both of which have won rave reviews from oenophiles. Both brothers are enthusiastic equestrians who also inherited and operate an important thoroughbred horse racing stable they call La Presle Farm and/or Wertheimer farm for racing in the United States and in France as Wertheimer et Frère partnership.

== Personal life ==
Wertheimer is married to Valérie (née Picavet), a former nurse; they have two children, Olivia Wertheimer and David Wertheimer (m. 2016 to Togzhan Isbazarova). He and his wife live in New York City and Switzerland. His wife is active in child protection charities.

Gérard and his brother own vineyards in France and Napa Valley, California.

The fortune of Gérard and Alain is managed by their family office, Mousse Partners.

== See also ==
- List of billionaires
