= Saonois =

French-bred Thoroughbred racehorse

- Sire: Chichicastenango
- Grandsire: Smadoun
- Dam: Saonoise
- Damsire: Homme de Loi
- Sex: Stallion
- Foaled: 17 April 2009
- Country: France
- Colour: Bay
- Breeder: Haras de Nonant Le Pin
- Owner: Pascal Treyve
- Trainer: Jean-Pierre Gauvin
- Record: 20: 7-1-2
- Earnings: £896,338

Major wins
- Prix La Force (2012); Prix du Jockey Club (2012); Prix Niel (2012)

Saonois (foaled 17 April 2009) is a French Thoroughbred racehorse and sire. Unlike most leading French racehorses which are trained in and around Paris and owned by multi-millionaires, Saonois was trained in the French provinces, conditioned by a little-known trainer and owned by a local baker. The colt won three of his seven races on minor tracks as a two-year-old and won one of his two starts at Cagnes-sur-Mer in early 2012. When sent to compete at the major Parisian tracks he won the Prix La Force and finished fourth in the Prix Greffulhe before recording an upset win in the Prix du Jockey Club. Later that year he won the Prix Niel but ran poorly in the Prix de l'Arc de Triomphe and the Hong Kong Cup. He remained in training in 2013, but failed to recover his best form.

== Background ==
Saonois is a bay horse with no white markings bred in France by Haras de Nonant-le-Pin. He was sired by Chichicastenango, who won four races including the Prix Lupin and the Grand Prix de Paris in 2001. As a breeding stallion the best of his progeny has been Vision d'Etat, whose wins included the Prix du Jockey Club and the Prince of Wales's Stakes. Saonois's dam Saonoise was a daughter of the Grand Prix de Paris winner Homme de Loi.

The colt was sent into training with Jean-Pierre Gauvin at his small provincial stable at Saint-Cyr-les-Vignes in the country between St Etienne and Lyon in the Rhône-Alpes region of France. He was owned during his racing career by Pascal Treyve, a baker from Bellegarde-en-Forez who bought the horse for as part of a group of three costing €13,000.

== Racing career ==
=== 2011: two-year-old season ===
On his racecourse debut, Saonois finished third in a race over 1200 metres at Lyon-Parilly racecourse on 10 June and then ran fourth in a similar event at Aix-les-Bains nineteen days later. After a break of more than three months he was moved up in distance and finished fifth over 1600 metres at Lyon-Parilly. Twelve days later he recorded his first success when racing over 1900 metres in a claiming race on the fibresand surface at Deauville Racecourse, winning by a length from Action Breaker and eight others at odds of 9/1. He returned to turf on 1 November and finished third behind Kadyny and Prince Solar in the Prix Aveu at Maisons-Laffitte Racecourse. In his last two races of the season, the colt won races on very soft turf at Lyon-Parilly on 20 November and on fibresand at Deauville of 21 December. In these races he was ridden by Antoine Hameliin, who partnered him in all his subsequent races.

=== 2012: three-year-old season ===
Saonois began his second season in February on the fibresand at Cagnes-sur-Mer on France's Mediterranean coast. After being beaten a short head by Sir Jade on his seasonal debut, he recorded a four lengths win against eight opponents in the Listed Prix Policeman over 2000 metres. After the race Gauvain said "He wasn't a natural from the start, but he has progressed with every run. It's great for his owner, who isn't one of the big guys, and has put absolute faith in me and my staff." On 8 April Saonois was sent to race at a metropolitan track for the first time and was moved up in class for the Group Three Prix La Force over 2000 metres at Longchamp Racecourse. Starting 7/2 second favourite in a six-runner field he raced in fourth place before moving forward in the straight. He struggled to obtain a clear run in the closing stages before breaking through in the final strides to win by a short head and a short neck from Saint Loup and the odds-on favourite Double Glory. Gauvain commented "I was a little worried because early on he was a little keen, but he showed on the sand at Cagnes he is a real competitor, and Antoine showed a very cool head". In the Group Two Prix Greffulhe over the same course and distance four weeks later he started 3.3/1 second favourite and finished fourth in a blanket finish behind Kesampour, Albion and Navel Orange.

On 3 June, Saonois started a 25/1 outsider in a twenty-runner field for 175th running of the Prix du Jockey Club over 2100 metres at Chantilly Racecourse. His opponents were headed by French Fifteen (winner of the Critérium International and runner-up to Camelot in the 2000 Guineas), and Imperial Monarch, the Aidan O'Brien-trained winner of the Sandown Classic Trial who started the 9/2 joint favourites. The other contenders included Saint Baudolino (Prix de Guiche), Kesampour, Most Improved, Ektihaam (runner-up in the Dante Stakes), Top Trip (Prix Hocquart), Hard Dream (Prix Noailles) and Sofast (Prix La Rochette). Hamelin held the colt at the rear of the field before beginning to make progress 800 metres from the finish. In the straight, Saonois moved up on the inside and accelerated through a narrow gap to take the lead inside the last 100 metres and won by three quarters of a length from Saint Baudolino. The 50/1 outsider Nutello was a head behind in third place just ahead of Kesampour.

After a break of more than three months, Saonois returned to the racecourse for the Prix Niel (a trial race for the Prix de l'Arc de Triomphe) at Longchamp on 16 September. He started the joint-third-favourite in the betting alongside Kesampour, behind Last Train (narrowly beaten by Imperial Monarch in the Grand Prix de Paris) and the Secretariat Stakes winner Bayrir. The colt was restrained by Hamelin in the early stages and was still last of the six runners 400 metres from the finish. He struggled to obtain a clear run until the last 100 metres when he accelerated between horses to take the lead and won by one and a quarter lengths and a short head from Bayrir and Last Train. In October, Saonois started at odds of 9/1 for the Prix de l'Arc de Triomphe after his owner paid a supplementary entry fee of €100,000. Racing on heavy ground, he never looked likely to win and finished fifteenth of the eighteen runners behind Solemia. On his final appearance of the season, Saonois was sent to Hong Kong to contest the Hong Kong Cup at Sha Tin Racecourse but made no impression, finishing tenth of the eleven runners behind California Memory.

=== 2013: four-year-old season ===
Saonois remained in training as a four-year-old, but showed little worthwhile form in five races. In the first half of the season he finished fifth in the Prix Ganay, eighth in the Grand Prix de Chantilly and sixth in the Grand Prix de Vichy. When he returned in Autumn he was tried in lower class races but made no impact, finishing last of eleven in a race on the synthetic polytrack surface at Chantilly in October, and ninth in the Listed Grand Prix de Marseille in November.

== Stud record ==
Saonois was retired from racing and began his career as a breeding stallion in 2014 at the Haras du Mesnil at a fee of €3,000. His first foals were expected in 2015.

== Pedigree ==
Pedigree of Saonois, bay stallion, 2009
Sire Chichicastenango (FR) 1998	Smadoun (FR); 1990	Kaldoun	Caro
Sire Chichicastenango (FR) 1998	Smadoun (FR); 1990	Kaldoun	Katana
Sire Chichicastenango (FR) 1998	Smadoun (FR); 1990	Mossma	Tip Moss
Sire Chichicastenango (FR) 1998	Smadoun (FR); 1990	Mossma	Ticma
Sire Chichicastenango (FR) 1998	Smala (FR); 1993	Antheus	Northern Dancer
Sire Chichicastenango (FR) 1998	Smala (FR); 1993	Antheus	Apache
Sire Chichicastenango (FR) 1998	Smala (FR); 1993	Small Partie	Fabulous Dancer
Sire Chichicastenango (FR) 1998	Smala (FR); 1993	Small Partie	Summer Parties
Dam Saonoise (FR) 1998	Homme de Loi (IRE); 19819	Law Society	Alleged
Dam Saonoise (FR) 1998	Homme de Loi (IRE); 19819	Law Society	Bold Bikini
Dam Saonoise (FR) 1998	Homme de Loi (IRE); 19819	Our Village	Ballymore
Dam Saonoise (FR) 1998	Homme de Loi (IRE); 19819	Our Village	Epona
Dam Saonoise (FR) 1998	Sa Majeste (FR); 1991	Garde Royale	Mill Reef
Dam Saonoise (FR) 1998	Sa Majeste (FR); 1991	Garde Royale	Royal Way
Dam Saonoise (FR) 1998	Sa Majeste (FR); 1991	Scamandre	Labus
Dam Saonoise (FR) 1998	Sa Majeste (FR); 1991	Scamandre	Scalene (Family 1-t)
