= Osunitas Stakes =

- Class: Restricted non-graded stakes
- Location: Del Mar Racetrack; Del Mar, California, United States
- Inaugurated: 1945
- Race type: Thoroughbred - Flat racing
- Website: www.dmtc.com

Race information
- Distance: 1 1/16 miles (8.5 furlongs)
- Surface: Turf
- Track: Left-handed
- Qualification: Fillies & Mares, 3-years-old & up
- Weight: 3-year-olds: 118 lbs. Older horses: 123 lbs. plus allowances
- Purse: $85,000 added
- Bonuses: $22,500 to winners bred in California

The Osunitas Stakes is an American Thoroughbred horse race held annually during the third week of July at Del Mar Racetrack in Del Mar, California. Open to fillies and mares age three and older, it is raced on turf over a distance of a mile and one sixteenth.

== Historical notes ==
Hall of Fame inductee Bill Shoemaker, whose four wins in the Osunitas Handicap is the most for any jockey, earned his first ever win as a trainer when Baldomero won this event for him in 1990.

== Records ==
Speed record: (at current 1 1/16 miles)

- 1:40.30 - Meydan Princess (2009)

Most wins:

- No horse has ever won this race more than once.

Most wins by a jockey:

- 4 - Bill Shoemaker (1970, 1974, 1978, 1984)

Most wins by a trainer:

- 6 - Ron McAnally (1965, 1981, 1986, 1993, 2004, 2008)

== Winners ==
- 2021 - Ippodamia's Girl (1:35.30)
- 2013 - CLOSING RANGE (1:41.44)
- 2012 - BROKEN DREAMS (1:41.71
- 2011 - ANDINA (1:42.07)
- 2010 - LILLY FA POOTZ (1:42.27)
- 2009 - MEYDAN PRINCESS (1:40.30)
- 2008 - ZARDANA (1:42.28)
- 2007 - KRIS SIS (1:41.75)
- 2006 - POLYFIRST (1:40.46)
- 2005 - HEALTHY ADDICTION (1:40.73)
- 2004 - VOZ DE COLEGIALA (1:41.15)
- 2003 - ARABIC SONG (1:40.61)
- 2002 - DYNAS CLUB (1:42.80)
- 2001 - PAGA (1:41.06)
- 2000 - SMOOTH PLAYER (1:42.60)
- 1999 - QUE BELLE (1:41.60)
- 1998 - TUZLA (1:41.00)
- 1997 - AURIETTE (1:42.60)
- 1996 - REAL CONNECTION (1:42.63)
- 1995 - MARINA PARK (1:42.60)
- 1994 - Gold Splash (1:41.20)
- 1993 - POTRIDEE (1:41.80)
- 1992 - VISIBLE GOLD (1:41.60)
- 1991 - KOSTROMA (1:41.20)
- 1990 - BALDOMERO (1:42.00) (Bill Shoemaker's first win as a trainer)
- 1989 - NIKISHKA (1:42.80)
- 1988 - GRIEFNAGGREVATION (1:42.20) (1st Division)
- 1988 - CHORITZO (1:41.40) (2nd Division)
- 1987 - SHORT SLEEVES (1:42.60) (1st Division)
- 1987 - MISS ALTO (1:44.00) (2nd Division)
- 1986 - LOUCOUM (1:42.60) (1st Division)
- 1986 - FLYING GIRL (1:42.20) (2nd Division)
- 1985 - CLOUDS DAUGHTER (1:43.60)
- 1984 - READY FOR LUCK (1st Division)
- 1984 - SALT SPRING (2nd Division)
- 1983 - NIGHT FIRE (1:43.60)
- 1982 - AFLICKER
- 1981 - BERRY BUSH (1st Division)
- 1981 - ADUANA (2nd Division)
- 1980 - PETRONS LOVE
- 1979 - PRINCESS TOBY
- 1978 - FACT
- 1977 - GRANJA SUENO
- 1976 - SWEET ROBBERY
- 1975 - MAMA KALI (Turf)
- 1974 - KAMADORA (Turf, 1st Division)
- 1974 - READY WIT (2nd Division)
- 1973 - CUTTY (1st Division)
- 1973 - DADDY'S DATSUN (2nd Division)
- 1972 - FUNNY FUNNY ACHE (1st Division)
- 1972 - OUR MADAM LUCKY
- 1971 - ANCIENT SILK (1st Division)
- 1971 - HAIL THE GREY (2nd Division)
- 1970 - QUEEN JANINE (1:43.00)
- 1969 - MISS LARKSVILLE (1st Division)
- 1969 - HULA BEND (2nd Division)
- 1968 - CIPHER (1st Division)
- 1968 - GREY'S CRICKET (2nd Division)
- 1967 - TALLEETA
- 1966 - WINDY KATE (1st Division)
- 1966 - ALIS THEME (2nd Division)
- 1965 - UNDENIABLE (1st Division)
- 1965 - POONA QUEEN (2nd Division)
- 1964 - KHAL IRELAND (1st Division)
- 1963 - SABINA LOUISE (1st Division)
- 1963 - MARY MEL (2nd Division)
- 1962 - BIB N TUK
- 1961 - Race Not Run
- 1951 - Race Not Run
- 1950 - HOLLER (1:11.00) (6 furlongs)
- 1945 - COPPER JADE (INAUGURAL RUNNING)
