= Château Marquis de Terme =

Winery in Bordeaux, France

Coordinates: 45.03840°N 0.67729°W

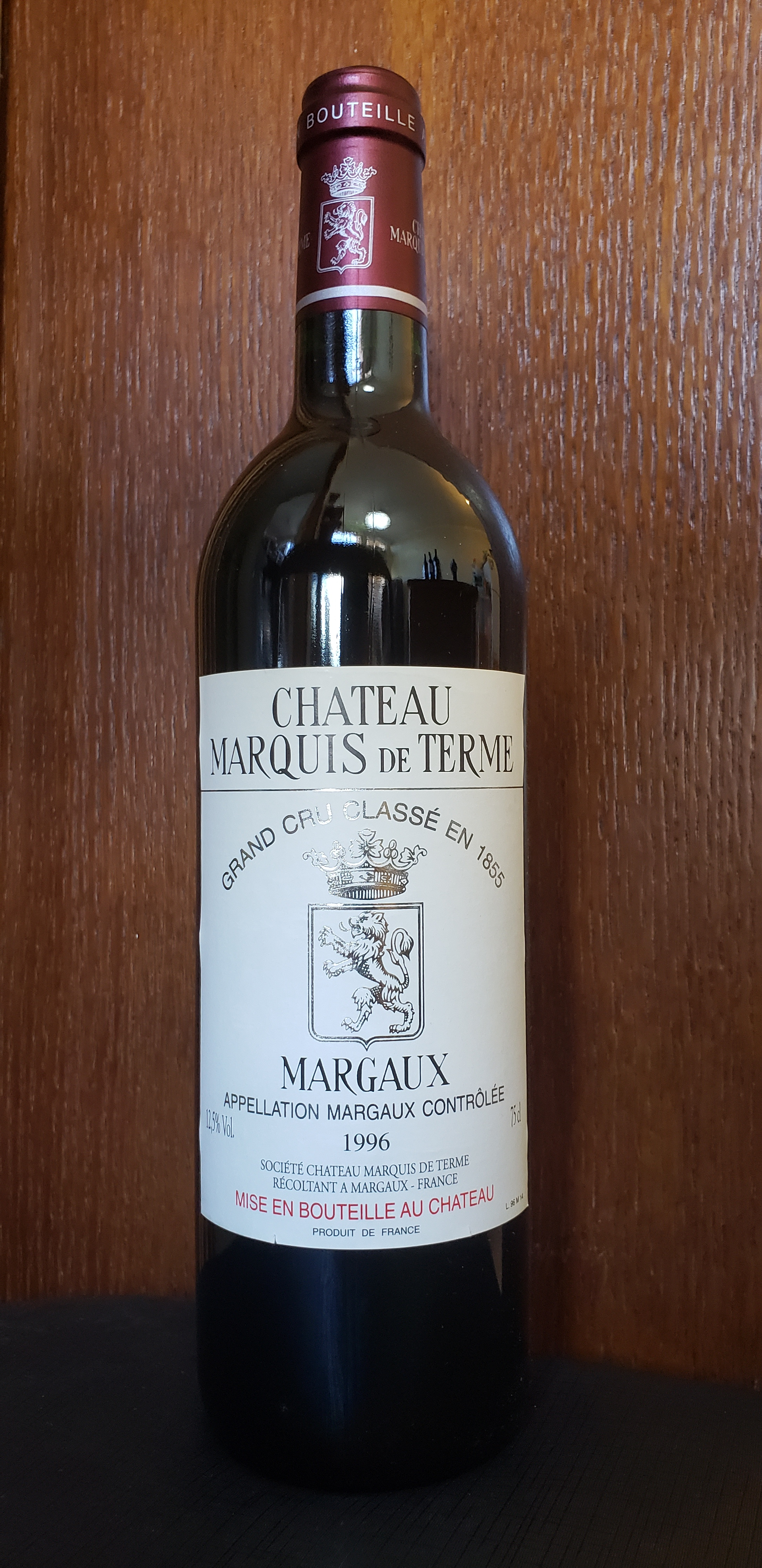
A bottle from 1996 vintage

Château Marquis de Terme is a winery in the Margaux appellation of the Bordeaux region of France. The wine produced here was classified as one of ten Quatrièmes Crus (Fourth Growths) in the historic Bordeaux Wine Official Classification of 1855.

== History ==
Château Marquis de Terme was once part of the vast Rauzan estate owned by Pierre de Rauzan, which had been divided by the time of the 1855 Classification into the estates of Château Rauzan-Gassies, Château Rauzan-Ségla, Château Desmirail, and Château Marquis de Terme.

In the 1760s, the 30 hectare Château Marquis de Terme passed into the ownership of François de Peguilhan, Marquis de Terme by a dowry. It was owned by the Feuillerat family for a century until it was sold during the early 20th century after the Great French Wine Blight. In 1935, ownership of the winery passed to wine merchant Pierre Sénéclauze.
