= Mousse Partners =

Family office of the Wertheimers

Mousse Partners Limited
- Company type: Private
- Industry: Family office
- Founded: 1991; 35 years ago
- Founder: Charles Heilbronn
- Headquarters: Solow Building, New York City, U.S.
- Key people: Charles Heilbronn (Chairman)
- AUM: US$90 billion (2021)
- Number of employees: 36+ (2021)
- Parent: Mousse Investments Limited
- Website: moussepartners.com

Mousse Partners is an investment management firm based in Bermuda that serves as a family office to manage the wealth of Alain and Gérard Wertheimer, the current owners of French luxury fashion house, Chanel. It is the investment division of Mousse Investments Limited (formerly Litor Limited), a Cayman Islands holding company for Chanel and its subsidiaries.

== Background ==
Mousse Partners was founded in 1991 by Charles Heilbronn, a Chanel executive and half-brother to its owners, Alain and Gérard Wertheimer. The purpose of the firm was to structure and manage the fortunes of Chanel and its owners. As a result, it can be seen as investing not only on behalf of the Wertheimer brothers but also on behalf of Chanel itself.

Mousse Partners was originally a subsidiary held by holding company, Mousse Investments Limited until December 2018 when it merged into Mousse Investments Limited and is current the investment division of the company.

Mousse Partners makes investments in both the public and private markets. It is involved in private equity, venture capital, real estate and credit investments. The firm is considered very secretive and details about its operations are scarce. When Chanel moved its headquarters to London and changed its organization structure, it could pay more dividends to its holding company, Mousse Investments due to more generous tax laws regarding dividends. In 2019 it paid US$1.6 billion and in 2021, it reached US$4.98 billion. As a result, Mousse Partners being the investment division of the holding company, had more capital to invest although it has not disclosed the amount.

Mousse Partners is headquartered in the Solow Building in New York City with additional offices in Beijing and Hong Kong. It has over 36 employees to manage its portfolio with many coming from operations such as The Carlyle Group, GIC and Soros Fund Management. Charles Heilbronn's son Arthur is a managing director of the firm.

In February 2023, it was reported that the Wertheimer family through Mousse Partners were one of the investors involved in the deal to take Rothschild & Co private.

In February 2024, according to an employee, Mousse Partners was looking at middle market leveraged buyout opportunities in Asia.
