= May-Eliane de Lencquesaing =

French winemaker

- Born: May-Eliane de Lencquesaing
- Occupation: Winemaker

May-Éliane de Lencquesaing (born 17th May 1925) is a French winemaker, for over 30 years the owner and managing director of the Pauillac winery Château Pichon Longueville Comtesse de Lalande. She supervised the 1982 and 1983 productions, regarded historically among the terroir’s finest vintages.

Upon the division of the estate in 1978 she inherited the family shares and acquired the remainder, and over the years of running Pichon Comtesse, has come to be viewed as an ambassador of Bordeaux wine. In 1994, May-Eliane de Lencquesaing was selected as "Woman of the Year" by the wine magazine Decanter.

Madame de Lenquesaing is a collector of more than 1,000 pieces of rare glass, dating from the Roman era (50 B.C.E.) and spanning nearly two millennia of production in the Middle East, Central Europe, France, and the United States. "Glass and wine have a lot in common," she told an interviewer. "They both come from poor material and poor soils and through man’s talent and genius, they become works of art."

Madame sold Lalande and bought an orchard estate in South Africa, Glenelly, in 2003. The farm was converted to grapes and mainly focuses on Bordeaux varieties, with Lady May being the outstanding wine.

== See also ==
- French wine
- List of wine personalities
