= Alain Wertheimer =

French businessman and billionaire (born 1948)

- Born: Alain Ernest Wertheimer; 28 September 1948 (age 77); Paris, France
- Occupation: Businessman
- Known for: Co-owner and chairman of Chanel
- Spouse: Brigitte Laloum
- Children: 3
- Father: Jacques Wertheimer
- Relatives: Gérard Wertheimer (brother); Pierre Wertheimer (grandfather)

Alain Ernest Wertheimer (born 28 September 1948) is a French billionaire businessman, based in New York City. He is the chairman and a controlling shareholder in Chanel, with his brother Gérard who chairs its watch division. As of October 2022, Wertheimer's net worth was estimated at US$40 billion by Bloomberg Billionaires Index, making him the 26th richest person in the world.

According to Forbes, Wertheimer is the 38th richest individual in the world. As of 25 December 2024, his estimated net worth is US$41.4 billion.

== Early life ==
Wertheimer was born on 28 September 1948, to a Jewish family, the son of Jacques Wertheimer and Eliane Fischer.

== Career ==
Wertheimer is the co-owner and chairman of Chanel.

The privately held company is run by Alain who has presided over the acquisition of several non-Chanel brands, including Eres Lingerie and beachwear, Tanner Krolle saddles and leather goods, and (from 1989 to 2021) Holland & Holland, a British gunmaker. (He sold his ownership of Holland & Holland to Beretta Holding in 2021.)

Based in France, the Wertheimer brothers own French vineyards including Château Rauzan-Ségla in Margaux, and Château Canon in Saint-Émilion.

Both brothers are equestrians who also inherited and operate a Thoroughbred horse racing stable they call La Presle Farm or Wertheimer farm for racing in the United States and is known as Wertheimer et Frère partnership in France.

== Personal life ==
Wertheimer is married to Brigitte Laloum; they have three children. He and his wife live in New York City.

Alain and his brothers own vineyards in France and Napa Valley, California.

The fortune of Alain and Gérard is managed by their family office, Mousse Partners.

== See also ==
- List of French billionaires by net worth
