= Pierre de Rauzan =

Bordeaux wine merchant

Pierre de Rauzan, also known as Pierre de Mesures de Rauzan, was a Bordeaux wine merchant. He served as estate manager of Château Latour. In the 1690s he began buying land in the Médoc near the village of Pauillac.

== Legacy ==
Upon the marriage of his daughter Thérèse to Jacques François de Pichon, Seigneur de Longueville, Rauzan passed on the estate to them which became the Pichon Longueville estate that would later split to the Second growth estates of Château Pichon Longueville Comtesse de Lalande and Château Pichon Longueville Baron. To his three sons, he bequeathed 60 acres (240,000 m^{2}) of vineyards around Château Margaux that would later become the second growths of Château Rauzan-Ségla and Château Rauzan-Gassies, as well as the classified growths Château Desmirail and Château Marquis de Terme.

== See also ==
- Bordeaux wine regions
- History of Bordeaux wine
