= Police des Vins =

The police des vins were a set of codes and business practices set up in the 13th and 14th century that govern the wine trade within the region of Bordeaux and the use of its port by neighboring areas. The codes were aimed at giving Bordeaux wine a position of dominance over the region and in the English wine market.

The codes had a particular effect on the wines from the Languedoc area, whose wines could not travel down the Garonne river to be sold in Bordeaux until after December 1. This caused those growers to miss the busiest season for trade when prices were at a premium. This sharply disadvantaged the competition for Bordeaux wine. Turgot, the minister of finance under Louis XVI, described the effect of this arrangement in the 18th century: "The conduct of this set of rules, most artfully devised to guarantee to the bourgeois of Bordeaux, the owners of the local vineyards, the highest price for their own wines, and to the disadvantage the growers of all the other southern provinces."

== Grand Coutume ==
The Grande Coutume (in English the Great Custom) was a principal export tariff imposed by the Plantagenets on products from their holdings in Gascony, Bordeaux and Poitou regions. In 1203, King John of England exempted the towns of Bordeaux, Bayonne and Dax from the tax in exchange for support against King Philip II of France. The following year, the towns of La Rochelle and Poitou were also granted exemption.

The lifting of the tax allowed for open access of Bordeaux wine to the English market, greatly increasing its prominence.
