= Green Dancer =

American-bred racehorse (1972–2000)

- Sire: Nijinsky
- Grandsire: Northern Dancer
- Dam: Green Valley
- Damsire: Val de Loir
- Sex: Stallion
- Foaled: 1972
- Country: United States
- Colour: Bay
- Breeder: Germaine Wertheimer
- Owner: Jacques Wertheimer
- Trainer: Alec Head
- Record: 8: 4–2–0
- Earnings: US$433,052 (equivalent)

Major wins
- Observer Gold Cup (1974); Prix Lupin (1975); Poule d'Essai des Poulains (1975)

Awards
- Leading sire in France (1991); Timeform rating: 132
- Last updated on 19 February 2025

Green Dancer (14 April 1972 – 5 December 2000) was an American-bred, French-trained Thoroughbred racehorse. A son of the British Tiple Crown winner Nijinsky, he won the French 2000 Guineas in 1975. Later he became a very successful sire.

== Background ==
A son of the English Triple Crown winner, Nijinsky, Green Dancer was bred in Kentucky by Germaine Wertheimer of Paris, who owned his dam Green Valley.

== Racing career ==
Green Dancer was raced in France by Wertheimer's son, Jacques, and trained by Alec Head. As well as winning the French 2000 Guineas he came first in two other Group One races in France and in England. In the 1975 Epsom Derby Green Dancer started 6/4 favourite but finished only sixth behind Grundy. His poor performance reportedly left Alec Head "dumbfounded".

== Stud record ==
Retired to stud in France, in 1980 Green Dancer was sent to stand at Gainesway Farm near Lexington, Kentucky. He became the fourth-leading sire in France in 1983 and 1984 and was that country's champion sire in 1991. Green Dancer's daughters produced seven champions that earned horse of the year honours in various countries on eight occasions.

Due to declining health, Green Dancer was pensioned near the end of November 2000 and had to be euthanised a short time later. He is buried in the Gainesway Farm cemetery next to Lyphard, another champion sire owned by the Wertheimer family.

Green Dancer sired:

- Greinton (born 1981) – won on grass in France and set two track records on dirt at Hollywood Park Racetrack in the United States. Won Hollywood Gold Cup, Californian Stakes, and Santa Anita Handicap.
- Suave Dancer (born 1988) – 1991 European Champion 3-Yr-Old Colt. Won Prix du Jockey Club, Irish Champion Stakes, Prix de l'Arc de Triomphe
- Gandria (born 1996) – won Prince of Wales Stakes, Canadian Champion Three-Year-Old Filly
- Rochester (born 1996) – millionaire, multiple stakes winner in USA
- Eishin Preston (born 1997) – Japanese Two-Year-Old Champion, won Hong Kong Mile and the Queen Elizabeth II Cup twice

Green Dancer was the damsire of:

- Sandpit (born 1989) – Brazilian 1993 Champion 3-year-old. Won four Grade I races in Brazil and four Grade I's in the United States
- Halling (born 1991) – 1996 European Champion Older Horse. Won Eclipse Stakes (twice), International Stakes (twice), Prix d'Ispahan
- Peaks and Valleys (born 1992) – 1995 Canadian Horse of the Year. Won Molson Export Million Stakes, Meadowlands Cup, Derby Trial Stakes
- Jeune – (born 1995) Australian Horse of the Year. Won five Group One races
- Quest for Fame (born 1997) – Won Epsom Derby, Hollywood Turf Handicap
- Lonesome Glory (born 1988) – American Hall of Fame steeplechase champion who was American Steeplechase Horse of the Year 1992, 1993, 1995, 1997, 1999.
- Kalanisi (born 1996) – 2000 American Champion Male Turf Horse. Won Breeders' Cup Turf, Queen Anne Stakes, Champion Stakes
- Black Minnaloushe (born 1998) – Champion Three-Year-Old Colt in Ireland. Won Irish 2000 Guineas, St. James's Palace Stakes.
