= Tanner Krolle =

British company

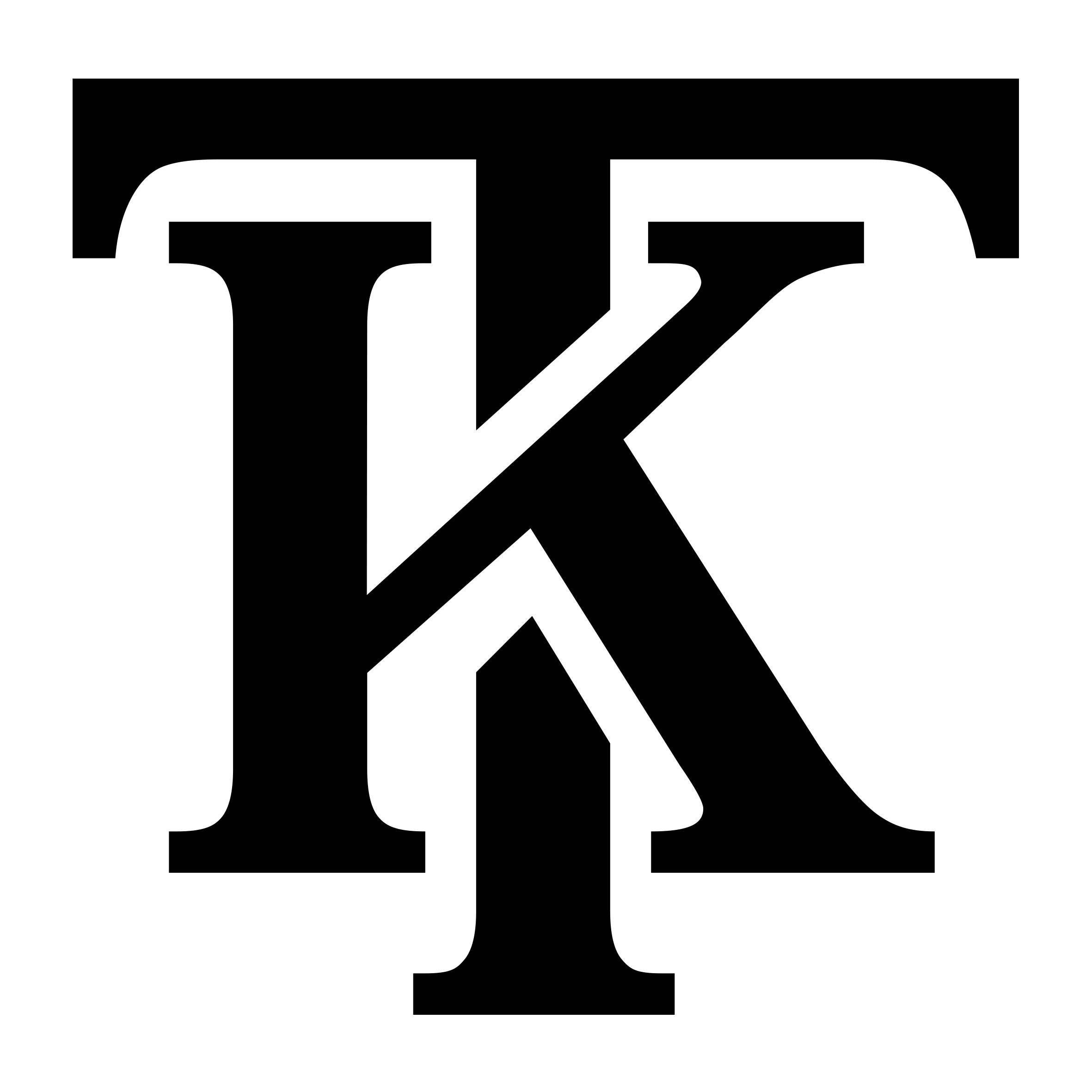
- Company type: Privately held
- Industry: Bespoke Leather Goods
- Founded: 1856
- Founder: Fredrick Krolle
- Headquarters: 70 Cadogan Place; London SW1X 9AH, London, England
- Website: www.tannerkrolle.com

Tanner Krolle is a manufacturer of leather goods based in London.

== History ==
In 1856, Frederick Franz Krolle founded the company.

In the early 1920s business slowed. At around this time Frank Squires, a salesman, introduced Albert Krolle to Frank Garrett, managing director and Chairman of R.T. Tanner and Co. Ltd. The two quickly became friends and F. Garrett suggested moving the entire A. Krolle business to Dorset Rise into R.T. Tanner & Co. Ltd. premises where there was spare space. This saved the A. Krolle business, which became an equal partnership trading as Tanner and Company. Customers at this time included include Harrods, Asprey, Debenham Freebodies, Dickins and Jones, John Pound, Drews, and Finnigans, all of which were interested in the company's handcrafted leather goods.

In the 1930s and 1940s the business grew as Albert's son, Geoffrey Krolle, joins the business. Tanner and Co. continued to receive tenders from the Ministry of Supply for straps, gun instrument covers, cockpit covers, canvas and leather equipment for military use. Unfortunately, in 1940, the entire building in Dorset Rise was destroyed through bombing and fire and all records, archive material, historical pieces were lost. New premises were temporarily found in Wheatsheaf House in Carmelite Street in the old Daily Mail building. By the end of the 1940s, R.T. Tanner and Co. Ltd. moved to Crayford and the company began exporting to the US to stores such as Brooks, Saks, Gimbel, Crouch Fitzgerald and London Harness. Harrods remained the biggest customer along with Fortnum and Mason as the product line was expanded to include zip suitcases, pullman bags, attaché cases and document cases.

In the 1950s, A. Krolle died and the structure evolved as Tanner and Co. bought another high-quality leather manufacturer, J.D. Watts for £6,000. Soon after, on 23 November 1956 Tanner Krolle and Co. Ltd. formed, a move which restored the Krolle family name into the trading title. The 1960s and 1970s continued to see growth and the name Tanner Krolle was first mentioned on products sold to Fortnum and Mason and eventually Harrods. Selfridges and other department stores were added and the product range was extended as the company began exporting to the continent. Notable customers included Cary Grant who travelled extensively using the Tanner Krolle Sportsman Bag, Jackie Onassis, who bespoke equestrian accessories and luggage, Diana, Princess of Wales, who travelled extensively using Tanner Krolle luggage and later commissioned school trunks for Princes William and Harry, as well as Saudi Arabia's late King Fahd bin Abdul Aziz Al Saud. In the early 1990s, Tanner Krolle was purchased by Chanel, with Alain Wertheimer presiding over the acquisition and later in 2003, a private equity group acquired the company.

== Present day ==
Tanner Krolle was relaunched in late 2019, selling leather bags, luggage and small leather goods from a Townhouse store on Cadogan Place in Belgravia. They also specialise in bespoke trunks including watch, jewellery and drinks trunks.
