= Château Rauzan-Gassies =

Winery in Bordeaux

Coordinates: 45.03669°N 0.67497°W

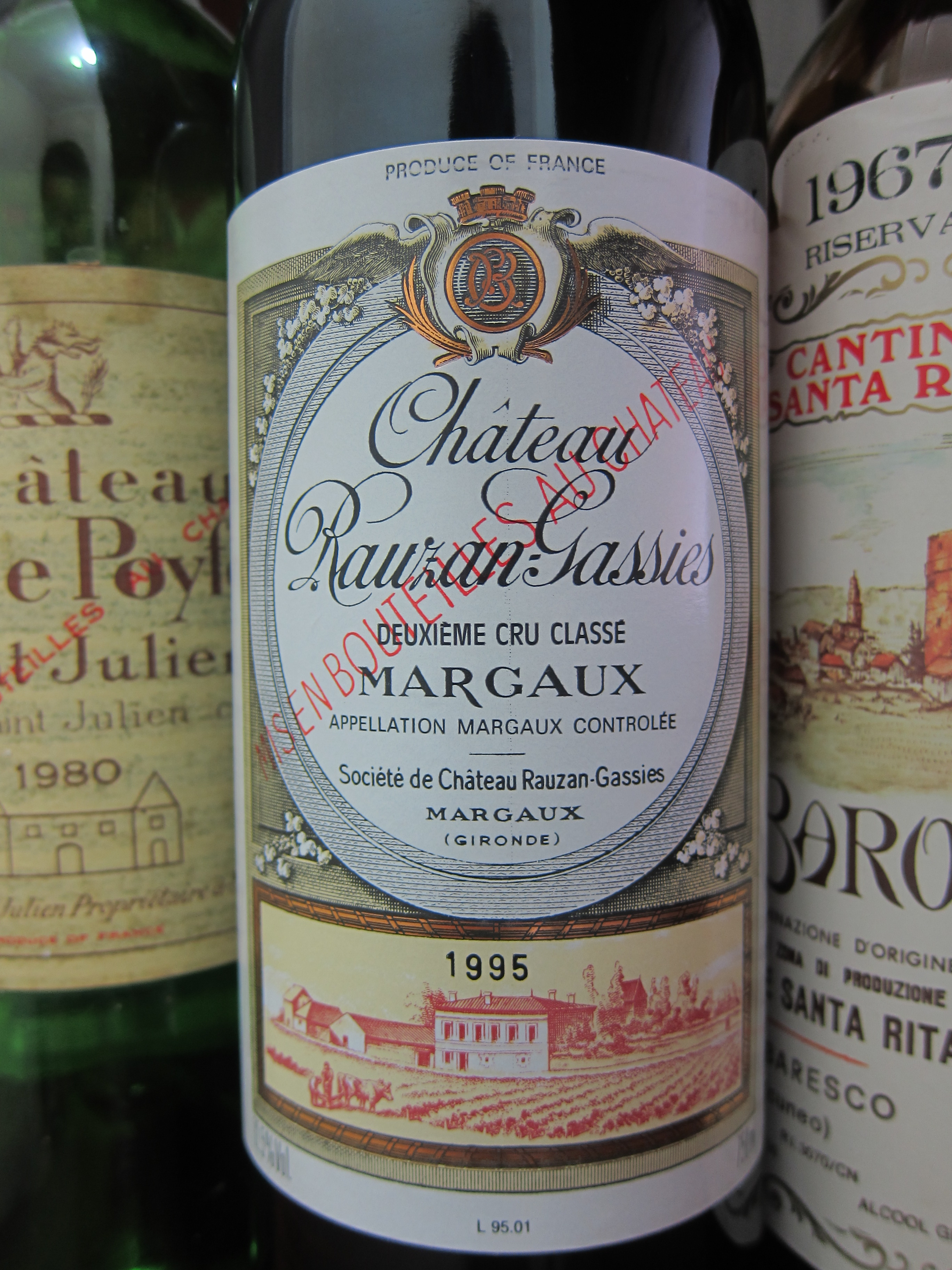
A bottle from the 1995

Château Rauzan-Gassies is a winery in the Margaux appellation of the Bordeaux region of France. Château Rauzan-Gassies is also the name of the red wine produced by this property. The wine produced here was classified as one of fifteen Deuxièmes Crus (Second Growths) in the original Bordeaux Wine Official Classification of 1855.

== History ==
The domain began as the property of Gaillard de Tardes in the 16th century, and belonged to Bernard de Baverolles in the 17th century, and came to be a part of the vast Rauzan estate owned by Pierre de Mesures de Rauzan in the 18th century. Over time this estate was divided, and by the time of the 1855 Classification, had been separated into the estates of Rauzan-Gassies, Château Rauzan-Ségla, Château Desmirail, and Château Marquis de Terme. The estate was purchased by the Quié family in 1945 and remains in their holdings.

== Production ==
Château Rauzan-Gassies consists of 28.5 hectares (70 acres) of vines, planted on the sandy-gravel soil typical to the Margaux appellation. There is a grape variety distribution of 65% Cabernet Sauvignon, 25% Merlot, 5% Petit Verdot and 5% Cabernet Franc. The neighbouring châteaux are Rausan-Ségla and Marquis de Terme.

Fermentation of the wine takes place in temperature-controlled stainless-steel tanks for about three weeks, after which the wine is aged for 14 to 18 months in oak barrels, 30% of which are new oak.
