= Gold River (horse) =

French-bred Thoroughbred racehorse

- Sire: Riverman
- Grandsire: Never Bend
- Dam: Glaneuse
- Damsire: Snob
- Sex: Mare
- Foaled: 11 January 1977
- Country: France
- Colour: Chestnut
- Breeder: Jacques Wertheimer
- Owner: Jacques Wertheimer
- Trainer: Alec Head
- Record: 14: 7-2-3
- Earnings: $678,467

Major wins
- Prix Royal-Oak (1980); Prix de Pomone (1980); Prix Jean Prat (1981); Prix du Cadran (1981); Prix de l'Arc de Triomphe (1981)
- Last updated on February 11, 2007

Gold River (1977–1986) was a French Thoroughbred racehorse best known for winning France's most prestigious race, the Prix de l'Arc de Triomphe.

== Background ==
Gold River was owned and bred by Jacques Wertheimer, the president of the French perfumery, Chanel. Gold River was sired by Riverman.

== Racing career ==
Gold River's first Group One win came in the 1980 Prix Royal-Oak. The following year she finished third in the Royal-Oak but won the Prix Jean Prat and the Prix du Cadran. In the Prix de l'Arc de Triomphe, Gold River was ridden to victory by jockey Gary W. Moore. In her Arc win, Gold River defeated Bikala and the American-bred filly, April Run.

== Breeding record ==
Following her retirement from racing, Gold River served as a broodmare at Hagyard Farm in Lexington, Kentucky. Her offspring included the stakes winners Riviere d'Or (Prix Saint-Alary) and Goldneyev (Prix Yacowlef). Riviere d'Or in turn produced Gold Splash and was the grand-dam of Goldikova.

Gold River died in 1986 and is buried in Hagyard Farm's equine cemetery.

== Pedigree ==
Pedigree of Gold River (FR), chestnut mare, 1977
Sire Riverman (USA) 1969	Never Bend (USA); 1960	Nasrullah (GB)	Nearco (ITY)
Sire Riverman (USA) 1969	Never Bend (USA); 1960	Nasrullah (GB)	Mumtaz Begum (FR)
Sire Riverman (USA) 1969	Never Bend (USA); 1960	Lalun	Djeddah (FR)
Sire Riverman (USA) 1969	Never Bend (USA); 1960	Lalun	Be Faithful
Sire Riverman (USA) 1969	River Lady (USA); 1963	Prince John	Princequillo (IRE)
Sire Riverman (USA) 1969	River Lady (USA); 1963	Prince John	Not Afraid
Sire Riverman (USA) 1969	River Lady (USA); 1963	Nile Lily	Roman
Sire Riverman (USA) 1969	River Lady (USA); 1963	Nile Lily	Azalea
Dam Glaneuse (FR) 1966	Snob (FR); 1959	Mourne	Vieux Manoir
Dam Glaneuse (FR) 1966	Snob (FR); 1959	Mourne	Ballynash (GB)
Dam Glaneuse (FR) 1966	Snob (FR); 1959	Senones	Prince Bio
Dam Glaneuse (FR) 1966	Snob (FR); 1959	Senones	Sif
Dam Glaneuse (FR) 1966	Glamour (GB); 1960	Djebe (FR)	Djebel
Dam Glaneuse (FR) 1966	Glamour (GB); 1960	Djebe (FR)	Catherine
Dam Glaneuse (FR) 1966	Glamour (GB); 1960	Tudor Gleam	Owen Tudor
Dam Glaneuse (FR) 1966	Glamour (GB); 1960	Tudor Gleam	Riding Rays (Family 22-d)
