= Pierre Wertheimer =

French businessman (1888–1965)

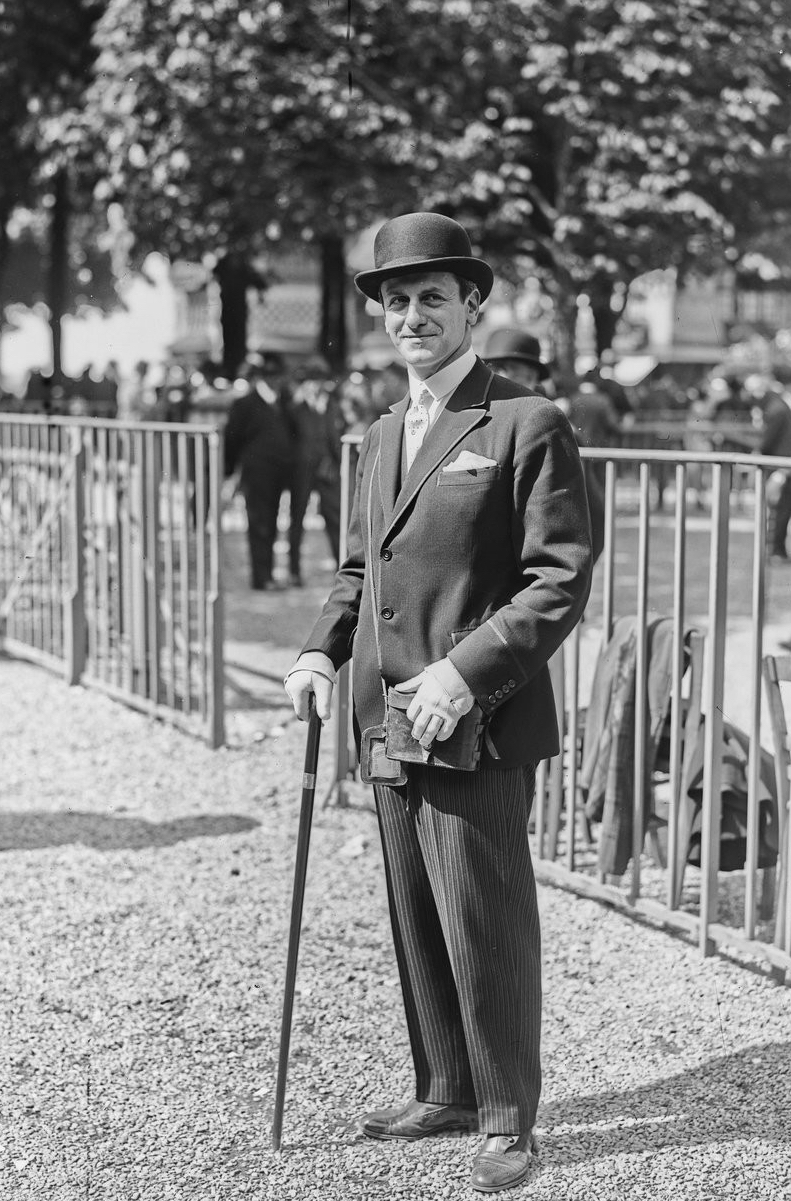
- Wertheimer in 1924
- Born: Pierre Wertheimer; 8 January 1888; Paris, France
- Died: 24 April 1965 (aged 77); Paris, France
- Occupation: Businessman
- Known for: Co-founding Chanel
- Spouse: Germaine Revel (m. 1910)
- Children: 2, including Jacques
- Relatives: Alain Wertheimer (grandson); Gerard Wertheimer (grandson)

Pierre Wertheimer (8 January 1888–24 April 1965) was a French businessman, who co-founded Chanel with Coco Chanel.

== Early life ==
Wertheimer was born 8 January 1888, the second of two sons, to Ernest Wertheimer and Mathilde Wertheimer (née Bollack). His father emigrated from Alsace to Paris in 1870.

== Family business ==
In Paris, the elder Wertheimer purchased an interest in the theatrical make-up company Bourjois. Bourjois, an innovator in these products for the stage, developed the first dry rouge, an improvement over the grease laden face paint customarily used. By 1920, Bourjois had become the largest and most successful cosmetic and fragrance company in France. Not restricted to the European continent, Bourjois was an international enterprise with corporate holdings in America. Their facility in Rochester, New York manufactured and distributed the Helena Rubinstein line of face creams. Maintaining Bourjois as a family business, Pierre Wertheimer and his brother Paul took over the directorship of the company in 1917.

== "Parfums Chanel" ==
In 1924, Coco Chanel made an agreement with the Wertheimers creating a corporate entity, "Parfums Chanel."

Chanel believed that the time was opportune to extend the sale of her fragrance Chanel No. 5 to a wider customer base. Since its introduction it had been available only as an exclusive offering to an elite clientele in her boutique. Cognizant of the Wertheimer’s proven expertise in commerce, their familiarity with the American marketplace, and resources of capital, Chanel felt a business alliance with them would be fortuitous. Théophile Bader, founder of the Paris department store, Galeries Lafayette, had been instrumental in brokering the business connection by introducing Pierre Wertheimer to Chanel at the Longchamp races in 1922. Bader was interested in inaugurating the sale of Chanel No. 5 in the Galeries Lafayette, distinguishing his store as the first venue to offer the fragrance to the general public.

For a seventy percent share of the company, the Wertheimers agreed to provide full financing for production, marketing and distribution of Chanel No. 5. Théophile Bader was given a twenty percent share. For ten percent of the stock, Chanel licensed her name to "Parfums Chanel" and removed herself from involvement in all business operations. Ultimately displeased with the arrangement, Chanel worked for more than twenty years to gain full control of "Parfums Chanel." In 1935, Chanel instigated a lawsuit against the Wertheimers, which proved unsuccessful.

== Nazi and Vichy anti-Jewish legislation and property seizures in France ==
World War II brought with it the Nazi seizure of all Jewish owned property and business enterprises, providing Chanel with the opportunity to gain the full monetary fortune generated by "Parfums Chanel" and its most profitable product, Chanel No. 5. The Wertheimers were Jewish, and in May 1941, Chanel used her position as an "Aryan" to petition German officials to seize sole ownership. Chanel was unaware that the Wertheimers, anticipating the forthcoming Nazi mandates against Jews, had taken steps to protect their interests. Prior to fleeing France for New York in 1940, they had legally turned control of "Parfums Chanel" over to a Christian, French business man and industrialist Félix Amiot. At war's end, Amiot turned "Parfums Chanel" back over to the Wertheimers.

== Personal life and death ==
In October 1910, Pierre Wertheimer married Germaine Revel (1888-1975), a daughter of a stockbroker and a member of the Lazard family of investment bankers. Revel was a great-granddaughter of the founder of Lazard.

They had one son:

- Jacques Guy Wertheimer (1911-1996), who was married and divorced to Eliane Fischer, had two sons Alain Wertheimer and Gérard Wertheimer.

Wertheimer died on 24 April 1965 aged 77 in Paris, France.

== Thoroughbred horse racing ==
Pierre Wertheimer was also a leading racehorse owner. In 1949, he hired the then 24-year-old Alec Head to train his horses. The Wertheimer/Head association in racing still continues through family members (Freddy Head was trainer of Goldikova, a 3-time Breeders' Cup Mile winner). Wertheimer's horses won numerous important races in France and the United Kingdom. Among the notable horses he owned was Épinard, called a racing legend by the French racing authority, France Galop.

Selected Group One race wins:

- 1000 Guineas: (1935)
- King George VI and Queen Elizabeth Stakes: Vimy (1955)
- Epsom Derby: Lavandin (1956)
- Prix de la Forêt: Épinard (1922), Midget (1956)
- Prix d'Astarté: Eleda (1934), Djanet (1956)
- Prix Maurice de Gheest: Sonny Boy (1933), Djanet (1956), Midget (1957), Tomahawk (1959)

After his death, his widow remained as an owner of prominent horses such as Riverman and Lyphard. Germaine Wertheimer's Group One race wins include:

- Prix de la Forêt: Démocratie (1969), Lyphard (1972)
- Prix du Jockey Club: Roi Lear (1973)
- Poule d'Essai des Poulains: Riverman (1972)
- Prix d'Ispahan: Riverman (1972)
- Prix Jacques Le Marois: Lyphard (1972)

The racing stable and the House of Chanel was inherited by his son Jacques Wertheimer who continued to be a force in French racing and who expanded the House of Chanel even further. On Jacques' death, the business went to his sons, Gérard and Alain Wertheimer.

== Sources ==
- Women's History from about.com
- Forbes.com: Forbes World's Richest People 2004
- Mazzeo, Tilar J., "The Secret of Chanel No. 5.", HarperCollins, 2010, ISBN 978-0-06-179101-7
- Thomas, Dana, "The Power Behind The Cologne, The New York Times, February 24, 2002
