= Jacques Wertheimer =

French businessman (1911–1996)

- Born: Jacques Guy Wertheimer; 18 August 1911; Deauville, France
- Died: 6 February 1996 (aged 84); Paris, France
- Occupation: Businessman
- Spouse: Eliane Fischer (m. 1947; div. 1952)
- Children: Gérard; Alain
- Father: Pierre Wertheimer

Jacques Guy Wertheimer (18 August 1911–6 February 1996) was a prominent French businessman who inherited and ran the renowned House of Chanel perfume company.

== Early life ==
Wertheimer was born at Les Forgettes villa in Deauville, to a Jewish family, the son of Germaine Revel and businessman Pierre Wertheimer who co-founded the Chanel perfume business in 1924.

== Career ==
Jacques Wertheimer inherited a thoroughbred horse racing operation which he developed into one of the leading stables in France. Alec Head trained for the family until his retirement in 1984 but for a number of years continued to act as their bloodstock advisor. Head's daughter Criquette took over as trainer and continued to have great success.

In the 1970s, Jacques Wertheimer boarded his Kentucky-based bloodstock at Hagyard Farm in Lexington, Kentucky. Among his broodmares were the French classic winners Dancing Maid, Gold River and Pistol Packer. All three are buried at Hagyard Farm.

Selected Group One race wins:

- Coronation Stakes: Gold Splash (1993)
- Critérium de Saint-Cloud: Poliglote (1994)
- Poule d'Essai des Poulains: Green Dancer (1975), Red Lord (1976), Green Tune (1994)
- Poule d'Essai des Pouliches: Ivanjica (1975), Dancing Maid (1978)
- Prix de l'Arc de Triomphe: Ivanjica (1976), Gold River (1981)
- Prix de l'Opéra: Mona Stella (1987), Athyka (1988, 1989)
- Prix de Diane: Reine de Saba (1978)
- Prix d'Ispahan: Carwhite (1978), Green Tune (1995)
- Prix du Jockey Club: Val de l'Orne (1975)
- Prix Marcel Boussac: Gold Splash (1992)
- Prix Royal-Oak: Gold River (1980), Agent Double (1984)
- Prix Saint-Alary: Reine de Saba (1978), Rivière d'Or (1988)
- Prix Vermeille: Ivanjica (1975), Dancing Maid (1978)

== Personal life and death ==
On 26 March 1947, Wertheimer married Eliane Fischer (1925–2024), the daughter of an architect. They had two sons, Alain and Gérard. The marriage was short-lived, and after separating, their divorce decree was issued on 11 September 1952.

He died on 6 February 1996 in Paris, upon which his business empire was taken over by his two sons.
