= Château Pichon Longueville Comtesse de Lalande =

Winery in Bordeaux, France

Coordinates: 45.1762°N 0.7524°W

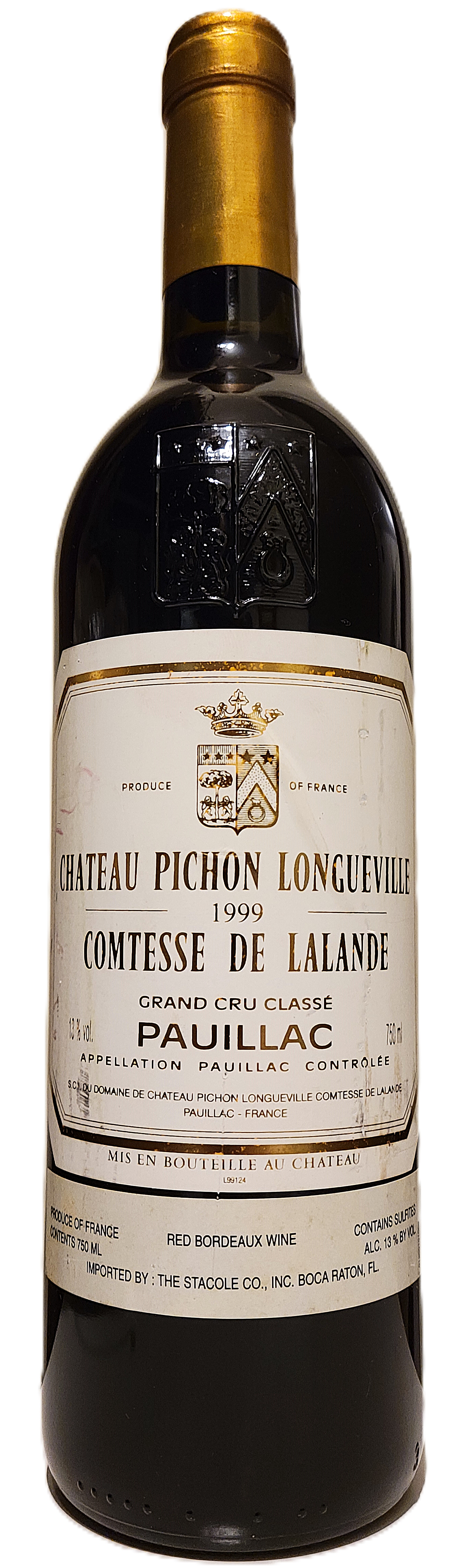
Grand Vin 1999

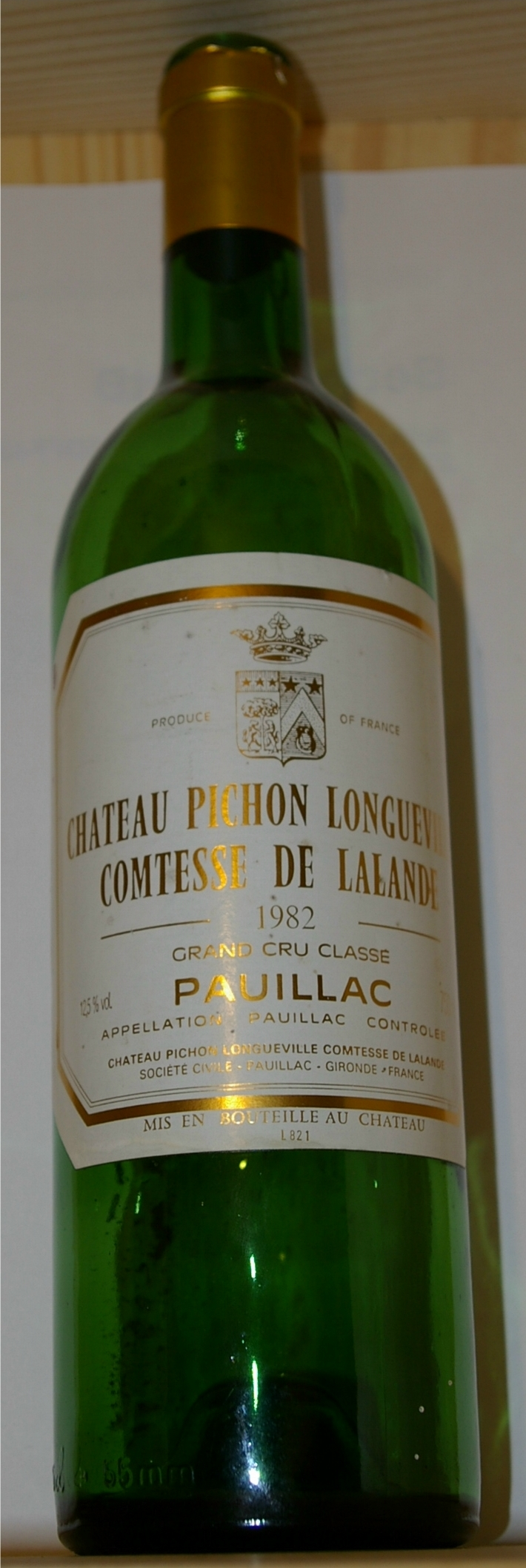
Grand Vin 1982

Château Pichon Longueville Comtesse de Lalande (commonly referred to as Pichon Lalande or Pichon Comtesse) is a winery in the Pauillac appellation of the Bordeaux region of France. Château Pichon Longueville Comtesse de Lalande is also the name of the red wine produced by this property. The wine produced here was classified as one of fifteen Deuxièmes Crus (Second Growths) in the original Bordeaux Wine Official Classification of 1855.

== Wine style ==
While the winery was once known for its higher percentage of Merlot and lower percentage of Cabernet Sauvignon in its blends, the vineyard started to move towards blends more consistent with other wines from the Pauillac region, with recent vintages being between 70 and 75% Cabernet Sauvignon.

The second wine is called Pichon Comtesse-Réserve.

== History ==
The estate was created by Pierre de Mazur de Rauzan at the end of the XVIIth century. The 80-hectare land (which included the Château Pichon Longueville Baron) originally extended from Pauillac and Saint-Julien. In 1694, de Rauzan's daughter married the Bordeaux politician Jacques Pichon Longueville, and the estate took the name Pichon. One of Pichon's daughters, the Comtesse de Lalande, became the next-generation owner of the estate.

In 1850, the estate was divided into the two current Pichon estates.

In 1925, Château Pichon Longueville Comtesse de Lalande was bought by Edouard Miailhe and Louis Miailhe. The daughter of Edouard Miailhe, May Eliane de Lencquesaing (born in 1925) later became the owner and manager of the property.

In 2006, de Lencquesaing sold a majority interest in the Château to the Rouzaud family, which also owns the Champagne house Louis Roederer. In 2009, the Roederer Group invested 30 million dollars in a replanting plan and a new wine cellar, in a move to turn the whole operation into a biodynamic farm.
