= Château Rauzan-Ségla =

French winery

Coordinates: 45.03543°N 0.67484°W

Château Rauzan-Ségla, or Château Rausan-Ségla, is a winery in the Margaux appellation of the Bordeaux region of France. Château Rauzan-Ségla is also the name of the red wine produced by this property. The wine produced here was classified as one of fifteen Deuxièmes Crus (Second Growths) in the original Bordeaux Wine Official Classification of 1855. The alternate name "Rausan-Ségla" was also frequently used until 1994 when the original "Rauzan-Ségla" again became the official name.

== History ==
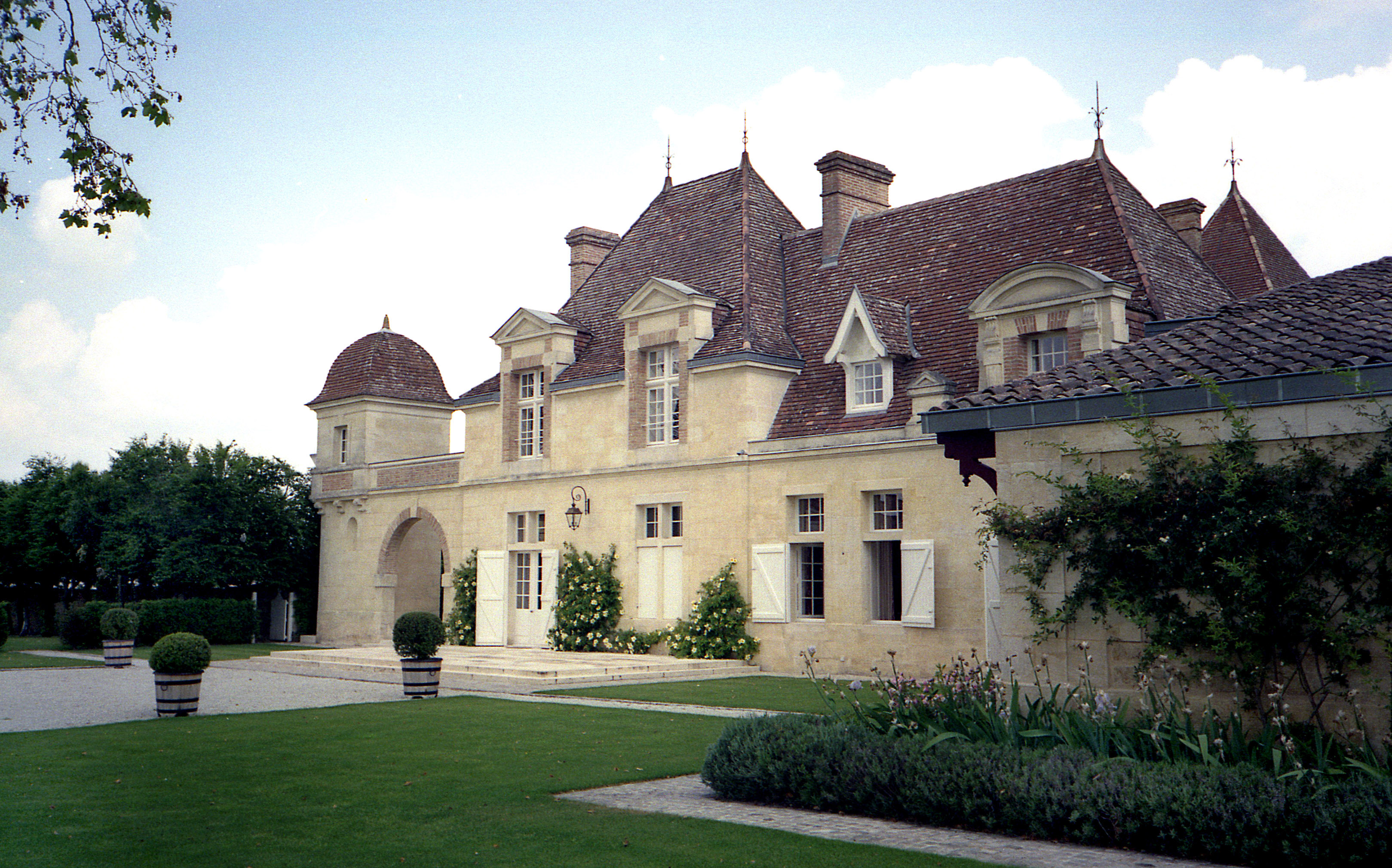
Château Rauzan-Ségla

Rauzan-Ségla was once part of the vast Rauzan estate owned by Pierre de Mesures de Rauzan in the mid-17th century. Over time, this estate was divided, and by the time of the 1855 Classification, had been separated into the estates of Château Rauzan-Gassies, Château Rauzan-Ségla, Château Desmirail, and Château Marquis de Terme.

After a long ownership by the Durand-Dasier family, the estate was acquired by Frédéric Cruse of the Cruse family in 1903 who held ownership until 1957, and until 1989 it belonged to Liverpool shipping magnate John Holt. By 1982 the estate had hired the consultant services of Émile Peynaud, and in 1989 the property was purchased by Brent Walker. Whatever plans he had, however, were not to bear fruit; in 1994 he sold the estate on to the Wertheimer family of Chanel, who installed a winemaking team led by David Orr and John Kolasa (both from Chateau Latour). Chanel remain the current owners, and they are credited with continuing to push the quality ever higher. In 2014, Nicolas Audebert, the former winemaker at Cheval des Andes, the LVMH property in Mendoza Argentina, was hired to succeed John Kolasa following his retirement.

== Production ==
The Rauzan-Ségla vineyard extends 51 hectares (130 acres) with the grape variety distribution of 61% Cabernet Sauvignon, 35% Merlot and 2% each of Cabernet Franc and Petit Verdot.

The grand vin is Château Rauzan-Ségla, with an annual production of 8000 cases, and the surplus wine is destined for the second wine named Ségla.
