= Château Pichon Longueville Baron =

Winery in Bordeaux, France

Coordinates: 45°10′34″N 0°45′09″W

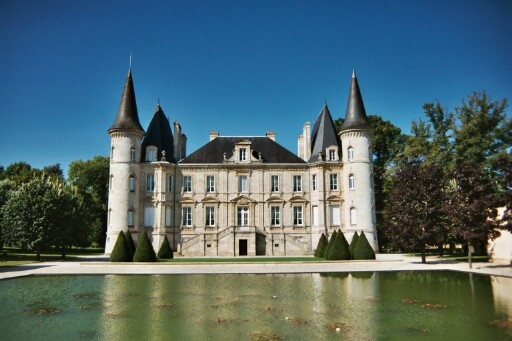
Chateau Pichon Baron, Pauillac, Bordeaux, France

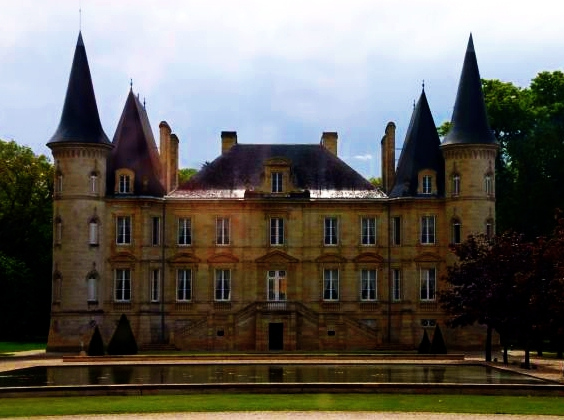

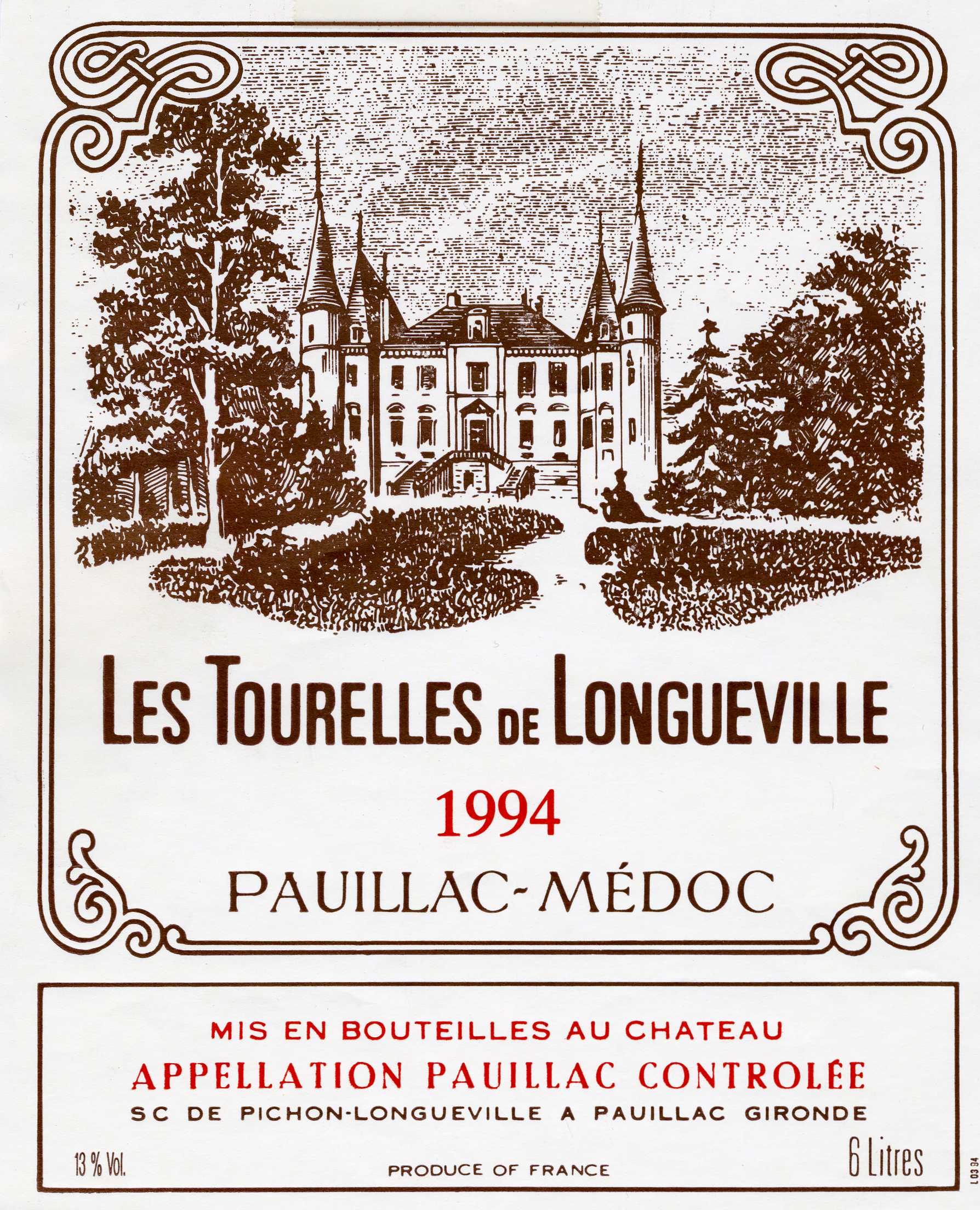
Les Tourelles de Longueville, 1994

Château Pichon Longueville Baron or Château Longueville au Baron de Pichon-Longueville (commonly referred to as Pichon Baron) is a winery in the Pauillac appellation of the Bordeaux region of France. Château Pichon Longueville Baron is also the name of the red wine produced by this property. The wine produced here was classified as one of fifteen Deuxièmes Crus (Second Growths) in the original Bordeaux Wine Official Classification of 1855.

== History ==
Château Pichon Baron was once part of a larger estate, owned by Pierre de Rauzan, along with Château Pichon Longueville Comtesse de Lalande. In 1850 the estate was divided into the two current Pichon estates. In 1987 the estate was purchased by French insurance company AXA, who immediately appointed Jean-Michel Cazes of Château Lynch-Bages as administrator. The property is currently managed by Englishman Christian Seely.

== Vineyard ==
Château Pichon Baron's 73 hectares are planted with Cabernet Sauvignon (60%), Merlot (35%), Cabernet Franc (4%) and Petit Verdot (1%). The planting density is 9 000 vines per hectare using a double Guyot training and the average age of the vines is 30 years. The yield is typically less than 40 hectoliters per hectare. The vineyard is situated at the southern end of the commune of Pauillac near border with the Saint-Julien-Beychevelle appellation.

== Wine ==
Grapes are harvested and sorted by hand, and then macerated for 20–30 days, and fermented at 28–32 °C in temperature controlled stainless steel vats of varying sizes. The wine is transferred into oak barrels for aging after finishing its malolactic fermentation. The estate also produces a second wine, Les Tourelles de Longueville.
