= Château Desmirail =

French winery

Coordinates: 45.02852°N 0.65397°W

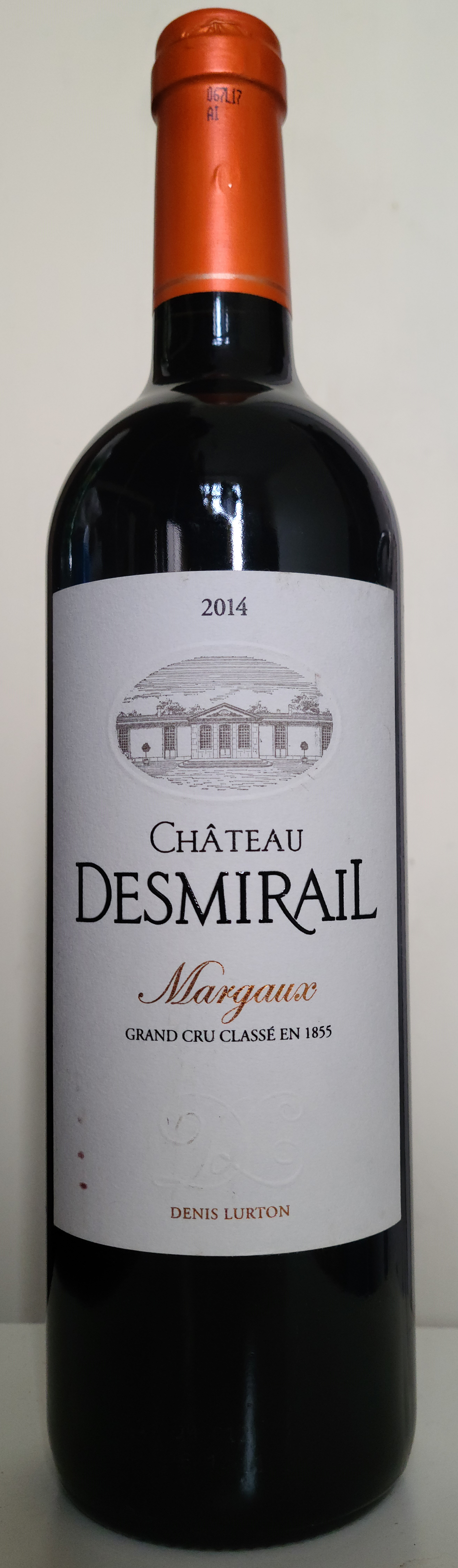
Château Desmirail 2014

Château Desmirail is a winery in the Margaux appellation of the Bordeaux wine region of France. It was classified as one of fourteen Troisièmes Crus (Third Growths) in the historic Bordeaux Wine Official Classification of 1855.

== History ==
Château Desmirail was originally founded by Jean Desmirail at the end of the 17th century, and had once been part of the vast Rauzan estate owned by Pierre de Rauzan. Château Desmirail was owned by M. Sipière, then-manager of Château Margaux, at the time of the 1855 classification.

It was owned by the nephew of Felix Mendelssohn by 1914, when it was confiscated and brought under the ownership of Martial Michel. In 1938, the physical château was sold to Paul Zuger of the Château Marquis d'Alesme Becker, while the vineyard was sold to Château Palmer. The 1963 vintages of Château Palmer wines were sold under the Château Desmirail name.

Château Desmirail re-emerged as an independent label in 1981 under Lucien Lurton.

== Wine ==
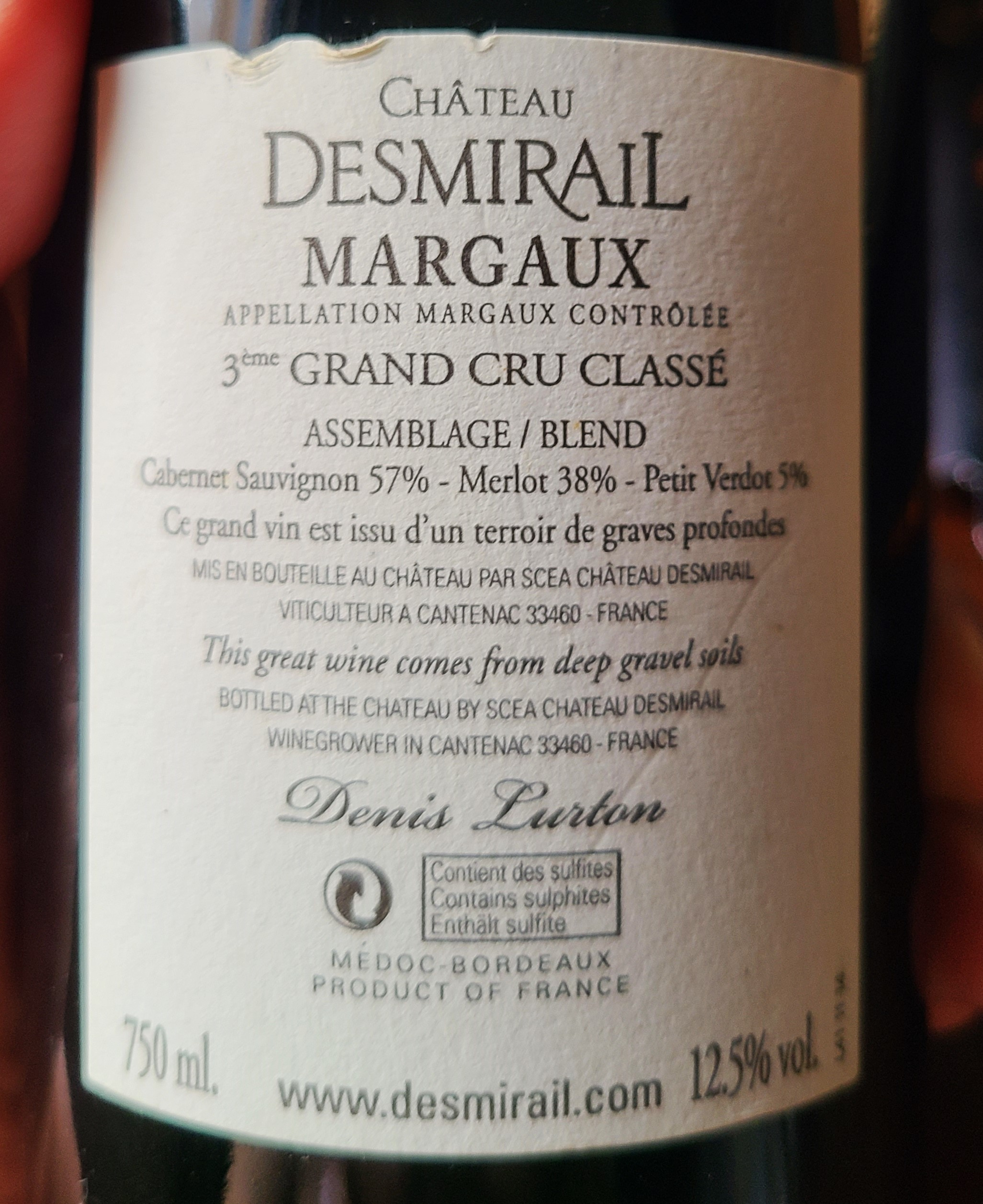
2014 back label

The vineyards feature the gravelly soils that characterise the better vineyards of the left bank of the Gironde, although there are also areas of sand and clay. There are approximately 30 hectares to the estate, with vines aged over 25 years on average, these being 60% Cabernet Sauvignon, the remainder mostly Merlot at 39% and a mere 1% accounted for by Cabernet Franc. According to the back label of 2014 grand vin the blend came from 57% Cabernet Sauvignon, 38% Merlot and 5% Petit Verdot. The fruit is hand-harvested before going to a sorting table positioned in the vineyard, from where it travels to the reception area where the grapes are destemmed, lightly crushed and then fermented according to the plot of origin. During the fermentation the must is pumped over to submerge the cap, and the temperature regulated to around 30 °C, with subsequent maceration of the solids at about two degrees below this figure. Following this the wine is run off into fresh vats for malolactic, tasting and assigning the wines to either the grand vin, Château Desmirail, or the second wine which goes by the name of Château Fontarney for the French market and Initial de Desmirail for export and for the French restaurant trade. The grand vin goes into oak for 12–18 months, with one-third of the barrels new each year; racking is performed every three months, and the fining is achieved with egg whites prior to bottling.
