= Attica Meli =

Irish-bred Thoroughbred racehorse

- Sire: Primera
- Grandsire: My Babu
- Dam: Come On Honey
- Damsire: Never Say Die
- Sex: Mare
- Foaled: 1969
- Country: Ireland
- Colour: Bay
- Breeder: Louis Freedman
- Owner: Louis Freedman
- Trainer: Noel Murless
- Record: 15: 7-3-1

Major wins
- Yorkshire Oaks (1972); Park Hill Stakes (1972); Princess Royal Stakes (1972); Geoffrey Freer Stakes (1973); Doncaster Cup (1973)

Awards
- Timeform rating 125 (1972, 1973); Top-rated British three-year-old filly (1972); Timeform top-rated older female (1973)

Attica Meli (1969 – after 1988) was an Irish-bred British-trained Thoroughbred racehorse and broodmare. Owned by Louis Freedman and trained by Noel Murless she won seven of her fifteen races and was regarded as the best British filly of her generation at both three and four years of age. She took time to show her best form but in the second half of 1972 she won five consecutive races including the Yorkshire Oaks, Park Hill Stakes and Princess Royal Stakes. In the following year she finished second in the Coronation Cup and the Hardwicke Stakes before stepping up in distance to record decisive wins over male opponents in the Geoffrey Freer Stakes and the Doncaster Cup. She was retired from racing at the end of 1973 and had some influence as a broodmare.

== Background ==
Attica Meli was a large bay mare with no white markings bred by in Ireland by the Sassoon Stud a breeding organisation founded by Victor Sassoon and later maintained by his widow. She was the penultimate European crop of foals sired by Primera, a stayer whose wins included the Ebor Handicap and the Ormonde Stakes, before he was exported to stand in Japan. He was a representative of the Byerley Turk sire line, unlike more than 95% of modern thoroughbreds, who descend directly from the Darley Arabian. Her dam, Come On Honey made little impact as a racehorse but was a very successful broodmare who also produced the Park Hill Stakes winner Royal Hive and Be Sweet, who finished second in the Ribblesdale Stakes and the Sun Chariot Stakes. Come On Honey was a daughter of Honeylight who won the 1000 Guineas and a half sister to Crepello and Twilight Alley.

In 1971 the Sassoon Studs were bought by Louis Freedman. The horses at the Sassoon's Beech House Stud, including the two-year-old Attica Meli, were sent to be trained by Noel Murless. During her racing career the filly was owned by Freedman and trained by Murless Newmarket. She was ridden in all of her major races by Geoff Lewis.

== Racing career ==
=== 1971 & 1972: two- and three-year-old seasons ===
On her only appearance as a two-year-old Attica Meli finished fourth in a maiden race over five furlongs. In the early part of 1972, the Murless stable was badly affected by an outbreak of a viral infection delaying the preparation and progress of the horses. Attica Meli ran well on her three-year-old debut when finishing third to Miss Paris in the Fred Darling Stakes over seven furlongs at Newbury Racecourse in April but then succumbed to the virus and was off the course for three months. In the summer of 1972 she won minor races over ten furlongs and 1 1/2 miles before being moved up in class for the Group One Yorkshire Oaks at York Racecourse in August. Ridden by Geoff Lewis she started at odds of 13/2 and won from Coral Beach, with The Oaks winner Ginevra in third place.

In autumn, Attica Meli was moved up in distance to contest the Park Hill Stakes over 14 1/2 furlongs at Doncaster Racecourse on 7 September. She started the 5/4 favourite and won again, beating the Galtres Stakes winner Carrot Top. Later that month, she ended her season by winning the Princess Royal Stakes over 1 1/2 miles at Ascot Racecourse.

=== 1973: four-year-old season ===
Attica Meli was matched against male opposition in all eight of her races in 1973. On her first appearance as a four-year-old, she finished fifth to Ormindo when favourite for the Ormonde Stakes at Chester Racecourse in May. In her next two race, Attica Meli finished second to Roberto in the Coronation Cup at Epsom Downs Racecourse and second to Rheingold in the Hardwicke Stakes at Royal Ascot. In the Princess of Wales's Stakes at Newmarket Racecourse in July she sweated heavily and became agitated before the start. In the race she led after half a mile but weakened quickly in the closing stages and finished fourth behind Our Mirage, Ormindo and Ballyhot. Timeform commented that they would not be surprised if she were to be "packed off to stud".

In August Attica Meli started at odds of 9/1 for the Geoffrey Freer Stakes over 13 1/2 furlongs at Newbury Racecourse, when she again faced Our Mirage, Ormindo and Ballyhot. She reportedly looked much more impressive in the paddock than she had done in her previous races that year. Lewis settled the filly in second place behind the pacemaker Bright Beam before taking the lead three furlongs out. She drew clear of her rivals in the last quarter mile and won by six lengths from Ballyhot with the six-year-old Petty Officer in third place. It was announced after the race that Attica Meli would be aimed at the Prix de l'Arc de Triomphe, but in her next race she was moved up in distance for the Doncaster Cup over 2 1/4 miles in September. She started the 4/11 favourite against three opponents headed by the three-year-old Goodwood Cup winner, Proverb. She took the lead two furlongs from the finish and won very easily by four lengths from the four-year-old Bretton Woods with Proverb in third.

At Longchamp Racecourse on 7 October, Attica Meli started at odds of 22/1 in a 27-runner field for the Prix de l'Arc de Triomphe over 2400 metres. She looked unimpressive in the paddock and had to be pushed along to reach a position just behind the leaders on the wide outside approaching the straight. She could make no further progress and tired badly in the closing stages to finish in 22nd place behind Rheingold. On her final racecourse appearance Attica Meli contested the St Simon Stakes at Newbury. She took the lead three furlongs out but was overtaken in the closing stages and beaten three lengths into second by the 20/1 outsider Ballyhot.

== Assessment ==
In 1972, the independent Timeform organisation gave Attica Meli a rating of 125, eight pounds below their top-rated three-year-old filly San San. In the British Free Handicap for three-year-olds, Attica Meli was the top-rated filly of 1972, two pounds below The Derby winner Roberto. In 1973 Timeform gain gave her a rating of 125, making her their highest-rated older female racehorse of the year.

== Breeding record ==
Attica Meli was retired from racing to become a broodmare. She produced at least seven foals and two winners between 1975 and 1988:

- Daidis, a bay filly, foaled in 1975, sired by Welsh Pageant. Failed to win in six races.
- Marathon Gold, bay, 1977, by Derring-Do. Won two races including the Lanson Champagne Stakes.
- Honeybeta, bay filly, 1980, by Habitat. Won three races, third in the Princess Royal Stakes. Grand-dam of Alberto Giacometti (Grand Prix de Saint-Cloud).
- Impossibility, bay filly, 1982, by Posse. Failed to win in two races.
- In Clover, bay filly, 1984, by Habitat. Failed to win in two races.
- Honey Reef, bay filly, 1986, by Mill Reef. Failed to win in three races.
- Sweet Request, bay colt (later gelded), 1988, by Rainbow Quest. Failed to win in eighteen races.

== Pedigree ==
Pedigree of Attica Meli bay mare, 1969
Sire Primera (GB) 1954	My Babu (FR); 1945	Djebel	Tourbillon
Sire Primera (GB) 1954	My Babu (FR); 1945	Djebel	Loika
Sire Primera (GB) 1954	My Babu (FR); 1945	Perfume	Badruddin
Sire Primera (GB) 1954	My Babu (FR); 1945	Perfume	Lavendula
Sire Primera (GB) 1954	Pirette (FR); 1943	Deiri	Aethelstan
Sire Primera (GB) 1954	Pirette (FR); 1943	Deiri	Desra
Sire Primera (GB) 1954	Pirette (FR); 1943	Pimpette	Town Guard
Sire Primera (GB) 1954	Pirette (FR); 1943	Pimpette	Arpette
Dam Come On Honey (GB) 1960	Never Say Die (USA); 1951	Nasrullah	Nearco
Dam Come On Honey (GB) 1960	Never Say Die (USA); 1951	Nasrullah	Mumtaz Begum
Dam Come On Honey (GB) 1960	Never Say Die (USA); 1951	Singing Grass	War Admiral
Dam Come On Honey (GB) 1960	Never Say Die (USA); 1951	Singing Grass	Boreale
Dam Come On Honey (GB) 1960	Honeylight (GB); 1953	Honeyway	Fairway
Dam Come On Honey (GB) 1960	Honeylight (GB); 1953	Honeyway	Honey Buzzard
Dam Come On Honey (GB) 1960	Honeylight (GB); 1953	Crepuscule	Mieuxce
Dam Come On Honey (GB) 1960	Honeylight (GB); 1953	Crepuscule	Red Sunset (Family 16-d)
