= European Free Handicap =

Flat horse race in Britain

- Class: Listed
- Location: Rowley Mile; Newmarket, England
- Race type: Flat / Thoroughbred
- Sponsor: Bet365
- Website: Newmarket

Race information
- Distance: 7f (1,408 metres)
- Surface: Turf
- Track: Straight
- Qualification: Three-year-olds
- Weight: Handicap
- Purse: £35,000 (2021); 1st: £19,849

European Free Handicap
2022
New Science	Tacarib Bay	Ribhi

Previous years
2021
Tactical	Naval Crown	Ontario

2020-2011
2019
Shine So Bright	Space Traveller	Azano
2018
Anna Nerium	Finniston Farm	Another Batt
2017
Whitecliffsofdover	Rodaini	Seven Heavens
2016
Ibn Malik	Scrutineer	Great Page
2015
Home Of The Brave	Tupi	Faydhan
2014
Shifting Power	Mushir	Aeolus
2013
Garswood	Emell	Lucky Beggar
2012
Telwaar	Bannock	Hazaz
2011
Pausanias	Rerouted	Utley

2010-2001
2010
Red Jazz	Quadrille	Mata Keranjang
2009
Ouqba	Awinnersgame	Penny's Gift
2008
Stimulation	Fat Boy	Royal Confidence
2007
Prime Defender	Tobosa	Eddie Jock
2006
Misu Bond	Jeremy	Advanced
2005
Kamakiri	Obe Gold	Stetchworth Prince
2004
Brunel	Moonlight Man	Parkview Love
2003
Indian Haven	Baron's Pit	Membership
2002
Twilight Blues	Approval	Ashdown Express
2001
Clearing	Palace Affair	Reel Buddy

2000-1991
2000
Cape Town	Catchy Word	Eurolink Raindance
1999
Bertolini	Indiana Legend	Kalidasa
1998
Desert Prince	Trans Island	Greenlander
1997
Hidden Meadow	Granny's Pet	Rich Ground
1996
Cayman Kai	Projection	World Premier
1995
Diffident	Harayir	Citadeed
1994
Bluegrass Prince	Canaska Dancer	Selhurstpark Flyer
1993
So Factual	Revelation	Salatin
1992
Pursuit Of Love	Steinbeck	Wolfhound
1991
Mystiko	Zigaura	Junk Bond

1990-1988
1990
Anshan	Osario	Book The Band
1989
Danehill	Folly Foot	Mon Tresor
1988
Lapierre	Charmer	Heroes Sash

The European Free Handicap was a Listed flat horse race in Great Britain open to three-year-old horses. It was run over a distance of 7 furlongs (1,408 metres) on the Rowley Mile at Newmarket in mid-April. In December 2022 the British Horseracing Authority announced that it would not be run in 2023.

The handicap for the race is based on the European Thoroughbred Rankings, an assessment of the previous season's two-year-olds published in January.

== History ==
Records point to the first running of the race being 1929. It was won by top weight Sir Cosmo carrying 9st. The event was formerly known as the Free Handicap. For a period it was backed by the Tote. The word "European" was added to its title in 1981.

The race served as a trial for various Classics in Europe. The last winner to achieve victory in the 2000 Guineas was Mystiko in 1991. The last participant to win the 1000 Guineas was Harayir, the runner-up in 1995.

== Records ==
Leading jockey (8 wins):

- Pat Eddery – Charlie Bubbles (1974), Lyric Dance (1979), Danehill (1989), Anshan (1990), Pursuit of Love (1992), So Factual (1993), Cayman Kai (1996), Twilight Blues (2002)

Leading trainer (5 wins):

- Richard Hannon Sr. – Bluegrass Prince (1994), Cayman Kai (1996), Cape Town (2000), Kamakiri (2005), Pausanias (2011)

== Winners ==
- Weights given in stones and pounds.

Year	Winner	Weight	Jockey	Trainer	Time
1929	Sir Cosmo	9-00	Joe Childs	William Walters	1:24.80
1930	Quothquan	7-04	Billy Nevett	Matthew Peacock	1:27.60
1931	Zanoff	7-05	Jack Sirett	Major Molony	1:26.00
1932	Rolling Rock	9-00	Rufus Beasley	Victor Gilpin	1:29.60
1933	Cotoneaster	6-13	Bill Rickaby	Fred Templeman	1:27.40
1934	Phaleron Bay	7-07	Eph Smith	Jack Jarvis	1:26.00
1935	Knighted	8-12	Arthur Wragg	Percy Allden	1:25.60
1936	Pay Up	8-02	Jack Sirett	Joseph Lawson	1:25.80
1937	Mid-day Sun	7-02	Kenneth Robertson	Fred Butters	1:30.80
1938	Lapel	7-00	Georgie Wells	George Lambton	1:27.20
1939	Solar Cloud	7-06	Cliff Richards	Fred Darling	1:27.00
1940	Salt Spring	8-12	Les Miles	V Hobbs	1:31.40
1941	Orthodox	8-03	Doug Smith	Noel Cannon	1:29.60
	no race 1942–43
1944	Roadhouse	7-12	Eph Smith	Jack Jarvis	1:29.00
1945	Grandmaster	8-13	Tommy Carey	Walter Nightingall	1:27.60
1946	Cama	8-05	Gordon Richards	Frank Butters	1:31.40
1947	Benedictine	8-07	Michael Beary	Henry Leach	1:28.20
1948	Rear Admiral	8-11	Herbert Packham	Herbert Smyth	1:28.20
1949	Spy Legend	8-00	Percy Evans	Rufus Beasley	1:24.20
1950	The Moke	7-02	Tommy Mahon	Willie Stephenson	1:26.00
1951	Wilwyn	7-12	Manny Mercer	George Colling	1:30.80
1952	Caerlaverock	7-12	Frankie Durr	William Smyth	1:28.60
1953	Good Brandy	8-05	Doug Smith	Harry Peacock	1:26.34
1954	Sun Festival	8-02	Sir Gordon Richards	Noel Murless	1:28.28
1955	Counsel	8-11	Joe Mercer	Jack Colling	1:29.36
1956	Honeylight	8-07	Edgar Britt	Charles Elsey	1:28.07
1957	Quorum	8-07	Alec Russell	Wilfrid Lyde	1:27.00
1958	Faultless Speech	8-04	Eph Smith	Harold Wallington	1:27.20
1959	Petite Etoile	9-00	George Moore	Noel Murless	1:32.65
1960	Running Blue	8-04	Johnny Limb	Jack Jarvis	1:28.24
1961	Erudite	8-06	Jimmy Etherington	Richard Peacock	1:28.40
1962	Privy Councillor	8-04	Joe Sime	Tom Waugh	1:28.84
1963	Ros Rock	8-01	Paul Tulk	Jeremy Tree	1:33.04
1964	Port Merion	8-09	Scobie Breasley	Sir Gordon Richards	1:26.26
1965	Short Commons	8-04	Russ Maddock	Pat Rohan	1:26.88
1966	Kibenka	8-04	Ron Hutchinson	Atty Corbett	1:27.14
1967	Supreme Sovereign	8-01	Peter Robinson	Avril Vasey	1:24.90
1968	Panpiper	7-13	Ernie Johnson	Ron Smyth	1:29.42
1969	Welsh Pageant	8-10	Sandy Barclay	Noel Murless	1:29.12
1970	Shiny Tenth	8-03	Geoff Lewis	Atty Corbett	1:29.80
1971	No Mercy	8-05	Brian Taylor	Harvey Leader	1:27.85
1972	Panama Canal	7-11	Richard Marshall	Bill Marshall	1:31.02
1973	Pitskelly	8-05	Bill Williamson	Michael Jarvis	1:25.52
1974	Charlie Bubbles	8-03	Pat Eddery	Peter Walwyn	1:25.56
1975	Green Belt	8-09	Eric Eldin	Harry Wragg	1:35.52
1976	Man of Harlech	8-04	Ron Hutchinson	John Dunlop	1:26.52
1977	Mrs McArdy	8-00	Taffy Thomas	Mick Easterby	1:26.32
1978	Remainder Man	7-10	Michael Wigham	Reg Hollinshead	1:28.13
1979	Lyric Dance	8-10	Pat Eddery	Jeremy Tree	1:27.65
1980	Moorestyle	8-10	Lester Piggott	Robert Armstrong	1:25.32
1981	Motavato	8-13	Steve Cauthen	Barry Hills	1:28.46
1982	Match Winner	9-04	Lester Piggott	Henry Cecil	1:26.39
1983	Boom Town Charlie	8-11	Tony Ives	Bill O'Gorman	1:30.98
1984	Cutting Wind	8-08	Walter Swinburn	Michael Hinchliffe	1:25.35
1985	Over the Ocean	8-11	Alain Lequeux	Olivier Douieb	1:27.60
1986	Green Desert	9-07	Walter Swinburn	Michael Stoute	1:32.36
1987	Noble Minstrel	9-07	Alain Badel	Olivier Douieb	1:27.00
1988	Lapierre	9-01	Michael Roberts	Clive Brittain	1:27.61
1989	Danehill	9-01	Pat Eddery	Jeremy Tree	1:27.57
1990	Anshan	9-07	Pat Eddery	John Gosden	1:24.07
1991	Mystiko	9-02	Michael Roberts	Clive Brittain	1:25.72
1992	Pursuit of Love	9-01	Pat Eddery	Henry Cecil	1:26.55
1993	So Factual	9-06	Pat Eddery	Guy Harwood	1:26.23
1994	Bluegrass Prince	8-13	Frankie Dettori	Richard Hannon Sr.	1:30.67
1995	Diffident	9-05	Michael Kinane	André Fabre	1:22.93
1996	Cayman Kai	9-07	Pat Eddery	Richard Hannon Sr.	1:22.98
1997	Hidden Meadow	9-03	Frankie Dettori	Ian Balding	1:25.60
1998	Desert Prince	9-05	Olivier Peslier	David Loder	1:31.39
1999	Bertolini	9-07	Frankie Dettori	John Gosden	1:26.00
2000	Cape Town	9-02	Richard Hughes	Richard Hannon Sr.	1:27.50
2001	Clearing	9-06	Richard Hughes	John Gosden	1:29.37
2002	Twilight Blues	9-05	Pat Eddery	Brian Meehan	1:24.88
2003	Indian Haven	9-01	John Egan	Paul D'Arcy	1:27.01
2004	Brunel	8-13	Darryll Holland	William Haggas	1:26.45
2005	Kamakiri	8-10	Ryan Moore	Richard Hannon Sr.	1:24.51
2006	Misu Bond	8-13	Tony Culhane	Bryan Smart	1:24.11
2007	Prime Defender	9-05	Michael Hills	Barry Hills	1:23.36
2008	Stimulation	9-03	Steve Drowne	Hughie Morrison	1:27.17
2009	Ouqba	8-09	Richard Hills	Barry Hills	1:27.22
2010	Red Jazz	9-06	Michael Hills	Barry Hills	1:26.55
2011	Pausanias	8-12	Richard Hughes	Richard Hannon Sr.	1:24.06
2012	Telwaar	8-11	William Buick	Peter Chapple-Hyam	1:28.03
2013	Garswood	9-00	Tony Hamilton	Richard Fahey	1:24.84
2014	Shifting Power	9-01	Ryan Moore	Richard Hannon Jr.	1:26.72
2015	Home of the Brave	8-13	James Doyle	Hugo Palmer	1:22.22
2016	Ibn Malik	9-06	Paul Hanagan	Charlie Hills	1:26.17
2017	Whitecliffsofdover	9-07	Ryan Moore	Aidan O'Brien	1:24.68
2018	Anna Nerium	8-13	Tom Marquand	Richard Hannon Jr.	1:26.34
2019	Shine So Bright	9-07	Silvestre de Sousa	Andrew Balding	1:24.68
	no race 2020 (Note: The 2020 running was cancelled because of the COVID-19 pandemic in the United Kingdom)
2021	Tactical	9-05	Oisin Murphy	Andrew Balding	1:24.79
2022	New Science	9-07	William Buick	Charlie Appleby	1:24.80

== See also ==
- Horse racing in Great Britain
- List of British flat horse races
