= Nearula =

Irish-bred Thoroughbred racehorse

- Sire: Nasrullah
- Grandsire: Nearco
- Dam: Respite
- Damsire: Flag of Truce
- Sex: Stallion
- Foaled: 1950
- Country: Ireland
- Colour: Bay
- Breeder: Roderick More O'Ferrall and C. Sweeney
- Owner: William Humble
- Trainer: Charles Elsey
- Record: 13:7-1-3
- Earnings: £27,351

Major wins
- Middle Park Stakes (1952); Thirsk Classic Trial (1953); 2000 Guineas (1953); St James's Palace Stakes (1953); Champion Stakes (1953); March Stakes (1954); Burwell Stakes (1954)

Awards
- Timeform rating 132

Honours
- Top-rated British two-year-old (1952); Timeform top-rated two-year-old (1952)

Nearula (1950–1960) was an Irish-bred British-trained Thoroughbred racehorse and sire, best known for winning the classic 2000 Guineas in 1953. Trained in Yorkshire, he was the top-rated British two-year-olds of 1952 when he won the Middle Park Stakes. In the following year he won the 2000 Guineas and the St James's Palace Stakes over one mile and the Champion Stakes against older horses over ten furlongs. He won two further races as a four-year-old before being retired to stud, where he had some success as a sire of winners before dying at the age of ten.

== Background ==
Nearula was a "compact, medium-sized" bay horse with a narrow white blaze and a white sock on his right hind leg, bred by Roderick More O'Ferrall and C. Sweeney at the Kildangan Stud, County Kildare, Ireland. As a yearling he was offered for sale and bought for 3,000 guineas by William Humble. The colt was sent into training with Captain Charles Elsey at his Highfield stable near Malton, North Yorkshire. Elsey had been training racehorses since 1911 and had recorded his first classic winner with Musidora in 1949. Nearula was ridden in most of his races by the Australian jockey Edgar Britt.

Nearula was from the second-last crop of foals sired by Nasrullah before his export to the United States. His dam Respite won only one minor race, but became a successful broodmare, producing seven other winners including the sprinter Drum Beat, whose wins included the King's Stand Stakes at Royal Ascot in 1958. Respite's dam Orama was also the female-line ancestor of the 1000 Guineas winner Waterloo and the Australian champion Todman.

== Racing career ==
=== 1952:two-year-old season ===
Nearula made his racecourse debut in the Coventry Stakes at Royal Ascot in June 1952, when he finished second to the odds-on favourite Whistler. He was then off the course for almost four months before reappearing in the Middle Park Stakes over six furlongs at Newmarket Racecourse in October. Starting at odds of 13/2 he won impressively from Novarullah and Cyrus the Great. Despite having run only twice, Nearula was given top weight of 133 pounds in the official Free Handicap, a rating of the best two-year-olds to have run in Britain that season.

=== 1953:three-year-old season ===
On his first appearance as a three-year-old, Nearula ran at his local course at Thirsk, where he won the Classic Trial Stakes over one mile by six lengths. On 29 April Nearula started 2/1 favourite against fifteen opponents in the 2000 Guineas over the Rowley Mile course at Newmarket. Ridden by Britt, he took the lead two furlongs from the finish and drew clear of the field to win decisively by four lengths from the filly Bebe Grande, with Oleandrin a further three lengths back in third place. Nearula's success was the first 2000 Guineas win of the century for a Yorkshire-trained horse.

Nearula was moved up in distance to contest the Derby over one and a half miles at Epsom. He recovered from a bruised foot and was the ante-post favourite for the race after heavy support in the betting but then suffered a more serious leg injury which disrupted his preparation and placed his participation in doubt. Nearula did run at Epsom, but made no impression in the race, finishing unplaced behind Pinza. Later that month Nearula reverted to the one mile distance for the St James's Palace Stakes at Royal Ascot. He started the 4/6 favourite and won from the Dee Stakes winner Victory Roll. The colt returned to one and a half miles for the third running of the King George VI and Queen Elizabeth Stakes at Ascot in July. He started second favourite, but again finished unplaced behind Pinza.

In September Nearula finished third to King of the Tudors at Ascot in the Knight's Royal Stakes, the race which was renamed the Queen Elizabeth II Stakes two years late. Nearula's final race of the year was the Champion Stakes over ten furlongs at Newmarket in October. He started at odds of 4/1 and won by three quarters of a length after a "fine race" against the Irish colt Sea Charger and the Washington, D.C. International Stakes winner Wilwyn. Shortly after his Newmarket win, Nearula was one of several horses who escaped without injury when Elsey's stable was extensively damaged by fire. At the end of the year it was announced that Nearula had been syndicated for £100,000 and would be retired to stud.

=== 1954:four-year-old season ===
Despite his syndication, Nearula remained in training as a four-year-old and began his third season by winning the March Stakes over ten furlongs at Newmarket on 30 April. The race was not particularly competitive: Nearula had only one opponent and started at odds on 1/10. At the same course two weeks later he took the Burwell Stakes, wis first success over one and a half miles. He was then sent to Epsom for the Coronation Cup over the Derby course and distance on 3 June. Nearula started 11/8 favourite failed to reproduce his best form and finished third behind Aureole and Chatsworth, beaten a total of ten lengths. He never raced again and was retired from racing at the end of the season.

== Assessment ==
As noted above, Nearula was the top-rated British two-year-old of 1952 in the official Free Handicap, two pounds ahead of the fillies Bebe Grande and Neemah. In the same year the independent Timeform organisation awarded Nearula a rating of 132, placing him equal with the French colt Dragon Blanc as the season's best juvenile. In their book A Century of Champions, based on a modified version of the Timeform system, John Randall and Tony Morris rated Nearula an "average" winner of the 2000 Guineas.

== Stud record ==
Nearula was retired to stud after being syndicated with a value of 100,000 guineas. In five seasons at stud he was not particularly successful, but did sire some good horses including Kythnos, who won the Irish 2,000 Guineas and finished third to St. Paddy in the Derby. His daughter Whimsical had some impact as a broodmare, being the grand-dam of the St Leger Stakes winner Bruni and the champion sprinter Never So Bold. Nearula died after rupturing a blood vessel when covering his first mare of the 1960 breeding season.

== Pedigree ==
Pedigree of Nearula (IRE), bay stallion, 1950
Sire Nasrullah (GB) 1940	Nearco (ITY); 1935	Pharos	Phalaris
Sire Nasrullah (GB) 1940	Nearco (ITY); 1935	Pharos	Scapa Flow
Sire Nasrullah (GB) 1940	Nearco (ITY); 1935	Nogara	Havresac
Sire Nasrullah (GB) 1940	Nearco (ITY); 1935	Nogara	Catnip
Sire Nasrullah (GB) 1940	Mumtaz Begum (FR); 1932	Blenheim	Blandford
Sire Nasrullah (GB) 1940	Mumtaz Begum (FR); 1932	Blenheim	Malva
Sire Nasrullah (GB) 1940	Mumtaz Begum (FR); 1932	Mumtaz Mahal	The Tetrarch
Sire Nasrullah (GB) 1940	Mumtaz Begum (FR); 1932	Mumtaz Mahal	Lady Josephine
Dam Respite (GB) 1941	Flag of Truce (GB); 1934	Truculent	Teddy
Dam Respite (GB) 1941	Flag of Truce (GB); 1934	Truculent	Saucy Sue
Dam Respite (GB) 1941	Flag of Truce (GB); 1934	Concordia	Son-in-Law
Dam Respite (GB) 1941	Flag of Truce (GB); 1934	Concordia	Ciceronnetta
Dam Respite (GB) 1941	Orama (GB); 1932	Diophon	Grand Parade
Dam Respite (GB) 1941	Orama (GB); 1932	Diophon	Donnetta
Dam Respite (GB) 1941	Orama (GB); 1932	Cantelupe	Amadis
Dam Respite (GB) 1941	Orama (GB); 1932	Cantelupe	Lupercalia (Family 1-u)
