= Manny Mercer =

British jockey (1928–1959)

Personal information
- Born: 15 November 1928 Bradford, Yorkshire, England
- Died: 26 September 1959 (aged 30) Ascot, Berkshire, England
- Occupation: Jockey

Horse racing career
- Sport: Horse racing
- Career wins: 978 in UK

Major racing wins
- British Classic Race wins: 1,000 Guineas Stakes (1953); 2,000 Guineas Stakes (1954); Other major race wins: Irish Derby (1956); St. James's Palace Stakes (1954); Sussex Stakes (1956); Yorkshire Oaks (1955); Cesarewitch Handicap (1951); Washington, D.C. International (1952); John Porter Stakes (1953); Queen Anne Stakes (1953)

Significant horses
- Darius, Happy Laughter, Wilwyn

Emmanuel Lionel Mercer (15 November 1928 – 26 September 1959) was an English thoroughbred horse racing jockey. A brother of jockey Joe Mercer, he was married to Susan, the daughter of trainer Harry Wragg. Their daughters were Joanna and Carolyn, who married jockey Pat Eddery.

Mercer was a leading jockey throughout most of the 1950s, winning two British Classic Races. In 1952, he gained much media attention in the United States for his masterful ride on Wilwyn in winning the inaugural running of the Washington, D.C. International at Laurel Park Racecourse in Laurel, Maryland.

He captured the 1953 1,000 Guineas Stakes aboard Happy Laughter, trained by Jack Jarvis. Although he was second jockey to Bill Rickaby at Jarvis's yard, and Rickaby got to ride the stable's main hope, Tessa Gillian, Mercer had worked out how good Happy Laughter was, even though she had been beaten in the Free Handicap. He told fellow jockey Jimmy Lindley that she was the best he had ridden.

In 1954, Mercer won 88 races, including the 1954 2,000 Guineas Stakes on Darius, and finished second in the jockey standings to Doug Smith.

Mercer died on 26 September 1959 when a filly named Priddy Fair threw him before the start of the Red Deer Stakes at Ascot Racecourse. Mercer was fatally kicked in the head as he fell to the ground. Reporting on his death, The Age newspaper in Melbourne called Mercer "one of Britain's most brilliant race riders". In an article marking the fiftieth anniversary of his death, the Racing Post called him "one of its [racing's] brightest stars". Lindley, who was riding in the race before which he died, said "If he hadn't been killed he would have been one of the greats. I'd put him in the same class as Lester Piggott".

Manny Mercer Court in Newmarket, Suffolk is named in his memory. He is buried in Newmarket Cemetery.

== Major wins ==
(United Kingdom) Great Britain

- 1000 Guineas Stakes - Happy Laughter (1953)
- 2000 Guineas Stakes - Darius (1954)
- St. James's Palace Stakes - Darius (1954)
- Sussex Stakes - Lucero (1956)
- Yorkshire Oaks - Ark Royal (1955)

(Republic of Ireland) Ireland

- Irish Derby - Talgo (1956)

== See also ==
- List of jockeys
