= Happy Laughter =

British Thoroughbred racehorse

- Sire: Royal Charger
- Grandsire: Nearco
- Dam: Bray Melody
- Damsire: Coup de Lyon
- Sex: Mare
- Foaled: 1950
- Country: Ireland
- Colour: Chestnut
- Breeder: E C Shirley
- Owner: Davis Wills
- Trainer: Jack Jarvis
- Record: 13: 9-2-1
- Earnings: £26,908

Major wins
- 1000 Guineas (1953); Coronation Stakes (1953); Falmouth Stakes (1953); Nassau Stakes (1953)

Happy Laughter (foaled 1950) was a British Thoroughbred racehorse and broodmare best known for winning the classic 1000 Guineas in 1953. As a two-year-old, Happy Laughter won five races but was badly affected by sinus problems which were only rectified by surgery in the winter of 1952/1953. As a three-year-old she followed up her win in the Guineas by taking the Coronation Stakes, Falmouth Stakes and Nassau Stakes before being retired to stud.

== Background ==
Happy Laughter was a medium-sized chestnut mare with no white markings bred in Ireland by E. C. Shirley. Her sire, Royal Charger was a successful sprinter and miler who was trained by Jarvis to win the Queen Anne Stakes and the Ayr Gold Cup in 1946. He made a promising start to his stud career in Ireland and went on to greater success after being exported to the United States in 1953. Happy Laughter's dam, Bray Melody was a great-granddaughter of the influential broodmare Verve, whose other descendants include Greek Money, Shirley Heights and Pentire.

As a yearling, the filly was sent to the sales at Doncaster where she was bought for 3,500 Guinea by the Newmarket trainer Jack Jarvis on behalf of the owner and breeder David Wills.

== Racing career ==
=== 1952: two-year-old season ===
Racing as a two-year-old in 1952, Happy Laughter won five of her seven races, appearing to be just below top class. She won the Stud Produce Stakes at Sandown Park and the Acorn Stakes at Epsom before being sent to Royal Ascot in June where she finished second to Nigrette in the Chesham Stakes. Happy Laughter then won the Fulbourne Stakes and the Soltykoff Stakes (both at Newmarket), but when moved up in class she finished third to Royal Duchy in the Lowther Stakes at York in August. In the Free Handicap, a ranking of the best two-year-olds to have raced in Britain, Happy Laughter was rated twelve pounds below her stable companion Tessa Gillian, the winner of the Molecomb Stakes. In an unusually strong year for two-year-old fillies, top place was shared by Bebe Grande (Gimcrack Stakes, Champagne Stakes, Cheveley Park Stakes) and Neemah who had beaten Pinza in the Royal Lodge Stakes.

Throughout the season, the filly had been suffering from a sinus problem, and when she was moved to her owner's stud to recuperate her condition deteriorated. Veterinary examinations revealed three separate infections and the filly underwent trephining to drain her sinuses. Her condition remained serious until aureomycin was imported from Ireland to treat the infection.

=== 1953: three-year-old season ===
In February, Happy Laughter returned to Jarvis' stable cured of her infection but with a hole in her head which required constant attention. In April she made her first appearance of the season in the Free Handicap over seven furlongs at Newmarket in which she finished second to Good Brandy, a colt who was carrying five pounds less than the runner-up. On 1 May Happy Laughter was one fourteen fillies to contest the 1000 Guineas over Newmarket's Rowley Mile course. She was ridden by Manny Mercer and started at odds of 10/1 with Bebe Grande, who had finished second in the 2000 Guineas being made favourite at 4/1 and Tessa Gillian starting at 9/2. The race was run in difficult conditions, with heavy, persistent rain and soft ground. Happy Laughter overtook Tessa Gillian two furlongs from the finish and defeated her stable companion by two lengths, with Bebe Grande five lengths away in third.

Happy Laughter was then moved up in distance to contest the Oaks Stakes over one and a half miles at Epsom on 4 June. She was strongly fancied for the race, but there were doubts whether, as the daughter of a sprinter, she would have the stamina to cope with the distance. Happy Laughter finished fourth of the twenty-one runners behind Ambiguity, Kerkeb and Noemi. At Royal Ascot, Happy Laughter was brought back in distance for the Coronation Stakes over one mile and won from Tessa Gillian. She then won the Falmouth Stakes at Newmarket's July meeting and the Nassau Stakes at Goodwood.

== Assessment ==
In 1953 the independent Timeform organisation awarded Happy Laughter a rating of 126, two pounds below the top-rated three-year-old filly La Sorellina. In their book A Century of Champions, based on a modified version of the Timeform system John Randall and Tony Morris rated Happy Laughter an “average” winner of the 1000 Guineas.

== Stud career ==
Happy Laughter was retired from racing to become a broodmare, but she had no success as a dam of winners.

== Pedigree ==
Pedigree of Happy Laughter (IRE), chestnut mare, 1950
Sire Royal Charger (GB) 1942	Nearco (ITY); 1935	Pharos	Phalaris
Sire Royal Charger (GB) 1942	Nearco (ITY); 1935	Pharos	Scapa Flow
Sire Royal Charger (GB) 1942	Nearco (ITY); 1935	Nogara	Havresac
Sire Royal Charger (GB) 1942	Nearco (ITY); 1935	Nogara	Catnip
Sire Royal Charger (GB) 1942	Sun Princess (GB); 1937	Solario	Gainsborough
Sire Royal Charger (GB) 1942	Sun Princess (GB); 1937	Solario	Sun Worship
Sire Royal Charger (GB) 1942	Sun Princess (GB); 1937	Mumtaz Begum	Blenheim
Sire Royal Charger (GB) 1942	Sun Princess (GB); 1937	Mumtaz Begum	Mumtaz Mahal
Dam Bray Melody (IRE) 1942	Coup de Lyon (GB); 1930	Winalot	Son-in-Law
Dam Bray Melody (IRE) 1942	Coup de Lyon (GB); 1930	Winalot	Gallenza
Dam Bray Melody (IRE) 1942	Coup de Lyon (GB); 1930	Sundry	Sunstar
Dam Bray Melody (IRE) 1942	Coup de Lyon (GB); 1930	Sundry	Queen's Company
Dam Bray Melody (IRE) 1942	Painter's Song (GB); 1935	Gainsborough	Bayardo
Dam Bray Melody (IRE) 1942	Painter's Song (GB); 1935	Gainsborough	Rosedrop
Dam Bray Melody (IRE) 1942	Painter's Song (GB); 1935	Cradle Song	Hurry On
Dam Bray Melody (IRE) 1942	Painter's Song (GB); 1935	Cradle Song	Verve (Family:1-l)
