= All Good =

All Good may refer to:

- "All Good?", a 2000 song by De La Soul
- All Good (album), a 2013 album by Nina
- All Good Music Festival

== See also ==
- All the Good, a Thoroughbred racehorse
