= Midnight Court =

Midnight Court may refer to:

- "The Midnight Court" (Irish: Cúirt An Mheán Oíche), an Irish-language poem by 18th-century poet Brian Merriman
- Midnight Court (film), a 1937 Warner Bros film
- Midnight Court (horse), a racehorse
- Midnight Court, a rock club night held at the Lyceum Theatre, London in the 1960s/1970s
  - Midnight Court at the Lyceum, a live album by Tyrannosaurus Rex, recorded at the club April 11, 1969
- Alternative courts employed by Irish secret societies in the late 18th and early 19th centuries
