= Frieze (horse) =

British-bred Thoroughbred racehorse

- Sire: Phideas
- Grandsire: Pharos
- Dam: Cornice
- Damsire: Epigram
- Sex: Mare
- Foaled: 1949
- Country: United Kingdom
- Colour: Bay
- Breeder: Alexander Keith
- Owner: Alexander Keith
- Trainer: Charles Elsey
- Record: 10: 7-1-0
- Earnings: £19,969

Major wins
- Epsom Oaks (1952); Yorkshire Oaks (1952)

Awards
- Timeform rating 126 (1952)

Frieze (1949 – after 1960) was a British Thoroughbred racehorse and broodmare best known for winning the 1952 Epsom Oaks. She won her first four races before finishing fourth to Zabara in the 1000 Guineas. She defeated Zabara decisively in the Oaks and won the Yorkshire Oaks later that year. She failed to reproduce her best form in two subsequent races and was retired from racing at the end of the year having won seven of her ten starts. She made little impact as a broodmare.

== Background ==
Frieze was a bay mare bred in England by her owner Alexander Keith. She was trained throughout her racing career by Charles Elsey at his Highfield stable near Malton, North Yorkshire.

Her sire Phideas won the Irish 2000 Guineas and Irish Derby in 1937 and whose other progeny included Procne, a staying filly who won the Park Hill Stakes and Ebor Handicap. Frieze's dam Cornice was a moderate racehorse who produced several other winners including Tudor Period (White Rose Stakes). She was distantly descended from the 1854 Oaks winner Mincemeat.

== Racing career ==
=== 1951: two-year-old season ===
Frieze showed very promising form as a two-year-old in 1952 when she was unbeaten in three minor races.

=== 1952: three-year-old season ===
In April 1952 Frieze began her second campaign by recording her fourth consecutive victory in a minor race at Stockton Racecourse. She was then moved up sharply in class to contest the 1000 Guineas over the Rowley Mile course at Newmarket Racecourse on 3 May. After taking an early lead she was outpaced in the final furlong and finished fourth behind Zabara, La Mirambule and Refreshed.

At Epsom Racecourse on 30 of May Frieze, ridden by the Australian jockey Edgar Britt, started at odds of just over 14/1 for the 174th running of the Oaks Stakes. Her eighteen rivals included Zabara, Refreshed, Arbele (Prix Penelope), The Brighton Belle (Princess Elizabeth Stakes), Primavera (Queen Mary Stakes) and Queen of Light (Criterion Stakes). Before the race Britt commented "She will stay the trip and should run well". Frieze won the race impressively, coming home three lengths clear of Zabara with Moon Star a length and a half further backi third. Her winning time of 2:35.8 was 0.4 seconds faster than that recorded by Tulyar in the Epsom Derby two days previously.

In July at Stockton Frieze won again without having to run as her opponents were withdrawn from the contest and she was allowed to walk over the course to claim the prize. In August the filly started 5/4 favourite for the Yorkshire Oaks at York Racecourse and, with Britt again in the saddle, won from Pharamis and Rose of Afghanistan. Her form tailed off in September and she was beaten in both the Downe Stakes at Doncaster and the Doonside Stakes at Ayr.

== Assessment and honours ==
The independent Timeform organisation gave Frieze a rating of 126 for the 1952 season, making her the fourth best filly of the season in Europe behind Lady Sophia, La Mirambule and Zabara. In their book, A Century of Champions, based on the Timeform rating system, John Randall and Tony Morris rated Frieze an "average" winner of the Oaks.

== Breeding record ==
At the end of her racing career Frieze was retired to become a broodmare. She produced at least four foals and two winners:

- Impost, a bay colt (later gelded), foaled in 1954, sired by Naucide. Winner.
- Welsh Border, bay colt, 1957, by Abernant. Won five races.
- Djebieze, bay filly, 1959, by Djebe. Failed to win in six races.
- Fossalta, chestnut filly, 1960, by Rockefella.

== Pedigree ==
Pedigree of Frieze (GB), bay mare, 1949
Sire Phideas (GB) 1934	Pharos (GB); 1920	Phalaris	Polymelus
Sire Phideas (GB) 1934	Pharos (GB); 1920	Phalaris	Bromus
Sire Phideas (GB) 1934	Pharos (GB); 1920	Scapa Flow	Chaucer
Sire Phideas (GB) 1934	Pharos (GB); 1920	Scapa Flow	Anchora
Sire Phideas (GB) 1934	Imagery (IRE); 1923	Gainsborough (GB)	Bayardo
Sire Phideas (GB) 1934	Imagery (IRE); 1923	Gainsborough (GB)	Rosedrop
Sire Phideas (GB) 1934	Imagery (IRE); 1923	Sun Worship (GB)	Sundridge
Sire Phideas (GB) 1934	Imagery (IRE); 1923	Sun Worship (GB)	Doctrine
Dam Cornice (GB) 1944	Epigram (GB); 1933	Son-in-Law	Dark Ronald (IRE)
Dam Cornice (GB) 1944	Epigram (GB); 1933	Son-in-Law	Mother In Law
Dam Cornice (GB) 1944	Epigram (GB); 1933	Flying Sally	Flying Orb (IRE)
Dam Cornice (GB) 1944	Epigram (GB); 1933	Flying Sally	Salamandra
Dam Cornice (GB) 1944	Cordon (GB); 1935	Coronach	Hurry On
Dam Cornice (GB) 1944	Cordon (GB); 1935	Coronach	Wet Kiss (IRE)
Dam Cornice (GB) 1944	Cordon (GB); 1935	Miss Brenda (IRE)	Righ Mor
Dam Cornice (GB) 1944	Cordon (GB); 1935	Miss Brenda (IRE)	Mount Brenda (Family 3-j)
