= Persian Gulf (horse) =

British-bred Thoroughbred racehorse (1940–1964)

- Sire: Bahram
- Grandsire: Blandford
- Dam: Double Life
- Damsire: Bachelor's Double
- Sex: Stallion
- Foaled: 1940
- Country: United Kingdom
- Colour: Bay
- Breeder: Zia Wernher
- Owner: Zia Wernher
- Trainer: Cecil Boyd-Rochfort
- Record: 9: 4-2-0

Major wins
- Coronation Cup (1944)

Persian Gulf (1940–1964) was a British Thoroughbred racehorse and sire, who raced during World War II. He was a slow-maturing horse who did not race until he was three years old and failed to win in his first season, although he finished fourth in both the Derby and the St Leger. As a four-year-old in 1944 he established himself as arguably the best horse in Britain by winning four of his five races, culminating with an emphatic win in a substitute Coronation Cup. His racing career was ended by injury less than a month later. He later became a very successful breeding stallion, siring a number of major winners.

== Background ==
Persian Gulf was a bay horse with a white star bred in the United Kingdom by his owner Lady Zia Wernher, a daughter of Grand Duke Michael Mikhailovich of Russia. He was sired by the Aga Khan's stallion Bahram the winner of the Triple Crown in 1935. Bahram was not a great success as a stallion but did sire Big Game and the St Leger winner Turkhan before being exported to the United States in 1941. Persian Gulf's dam Double Life was bought as a yearling for 600 guineas by Cecil Boyd-Rochfort on behalf of Zia Wernher in October 1927. She proved to be a top-class racemare, winning the Cambridgeshire Handicap in 1929. After her retirement from racing she became a highly influential broodmare: in addition to Persian Gulf she produced Precipitation and was the female-line ancestor of Meld, Charlottown, Kalaglow, Ramonti and Shahtoush.

Persian Gulf was trained throughout his racing career by Boyd-Rochfort at his Freemason Lodge stable at Newmarket, Suffolk.

Why Hurry's racing career took place during World War II during which horse racing in Britain was subject to many restrictions. Several major racecourses, including Epsom and Doncaster, were closed for the duration of the conflict, either for safety reasons, or because they were being used by the military. Many important races were rescheduled to new dates and venues, often at short notice, and all five of the Classics were usually run at Newmarket.

== Racing career ==
=== 1943: three-year-old season ===
Persian Gulf was slow to mature and did not race as a two-year-old. Boyd-Rochfort said of the colt, "This is the best in the stable and I believe he will be a great horse, but not this year." As a three-year-old in 1943 Persian Gulf failed to win but ran well at the highest level.

With Epsom Downs racecourse being used by the military a substitute "New Derby" was run over one and a half miles on the July course at Newmarket Racecourse on 19 June. The population of Newmarket reportedly doubled by the 15,000 spectators for the race, with many spending the night of the race in the open as all the hotels and boarding houses were full. Persian Gulf led the twenty-three runner field until half way and stayed on after being overtaken to finish fourth behind Straight Deal, Umiddad and Nasrullah. He was then dropped sharply in class and finished second in a maiden race in August.

The "New St Leger" was run over one mile and six furlong at the Newmarket July course in September. Persian Gulf again ran well to finish fourth behind Herringbone, Ribbon and Straight Deal.

=== 1944: four-year-old season ===
Persian Gulf reached his peak as a four-year-old in 1944. One result of the wartime restrictions was that only horses who had been placed in the first three were allowed to remain in training: Persian Gulf qualified by virtue of his second place in the August maiden. After winning three times in spring, he was beaten by a neck when attempting to concede four pounds to Umiddad in the Thorney Stakes over one and three quarter miles at Newmarket. On 6 June he started at odds of 5/2 for a substitute Coronation Cup at the same course. Ridden by Robert A "Bobby" Jones, he led from the start and drew away in the last quarter mile to win easily from High Chancellor with Umiddad in third place. His racing career was ended in late June when he sustained a fracture to a cannon bone.

According to one report, Persian Gulf covered a distance of two miles twenty-four yards in a time of 3:07.6 at Newmarket in 1944.

== Assessment ==
In their book A Century of Champions, based on a modified version of the Timeform system, John Randall and Tony Morris rated Persian Gulf the one hundred and thirteenth best racehorse of twentieth century, the forty-ninth best horse of the century to have been trained in Britain and Ireland, and the third best horse foaled in 1943 behind Count Fleet and Marsyas.

== Stud record ==
Persian Gulf began his stud career in 1945 and had considerable success as a breeding stallion. He was never Champion Sire but finished in the top twelve on eight occasions. His best winners included the British Classic Race winners Parthia and Zabara, the leading stayer Zarathustra and the Champion Hurdler Persian War. Other good horses sired by Persian Gulf included Abadan (Cork and Orrery Stakes, Diadem Stakes), Agreement (Doncaster Cup), Arabian Night (second in the 1954 Epsom Derby), Persian Road (Ebor Handicap, sire of Dark Mirage), Queen of Sheba (Irish 1,000 Guineas, Royal Hunt Cup), Rustam (Champagne Stakes) and Tamerlane (St James's Palace Stakes). He died on 22 July 1964 at the age of 24.

== Sire line tree ==
- Persian Gulf
  - Abadan
    - Jack Ketch
    - My Pal
      - Rio
  - Khor-Mousa
  - Papayer
    - Paradox
  - Arab Legion
  - Arabian Night
  - Zarathustra
    - Zaleucus
      - Reprieve
      - Zell
    - Crozier
  - Tamerlane
    - Eastern Nip
    - Final Problem
    - Indian Conquest
      - Questilla
    - Marlon
      - Mowgli
      - Montevideo
      - Mentor
    - Cassim
    - Flying Star
    - Lanesborough
      - Beer Street
        - Watney
          - Double Gin
      - Piping Lane
    - Tambel
    - Tiger
      - Nor
    - Dschingis Khan
      - Uditore
      - Alfredo
      - Cagliostro
        - Kondor
      - Konigsstuhl
        - Helikon
        - Astylos
        - Medicus
        - Alkalde
        - Mandelbaum
        - Pik Konig
        - Monsun
        - Caballo
        - Twen
        - Lavirco
        - Surako
        - Laveron
      - Elektrant
      - Orofino
        - Vincenzo
        - Lorofino
      - Orfano
    - King's Lane
    - Young Turnabout
      - Valencia Boy
    - Tycoon
      - Haveroid
    - Streakie
    - Tamermarc
    - Origines
    - Alpenkonig
      - Tuttlinger
      - Lorimer
      - Slenderhagen
      - Ganymed
      - Sevillano
      - Foscari
    - Eric
    - Eucalyptus
    - Tamil
    - Lane Court
      - Homosassa
    - Tamerino
      - Domingo
    - Trainer's Seat
      - Satan's Son
  - Clarification
    - Resolution
    - Top Rank
    - I'll Be There
  - Rustam
    - Talahasse
    - Double Jump
      - Doleswood
  - Zimone
    - Rockstone
    - Tanno
    - Caronte
    - Conte Zimon
    - Shank
      - Rio
  - Agreement
  - Rhythmic Light
  - Persian Road
  - Restoration
  - Parthia
    - Um Said
    - Djelo Binza
    - Greek God
    - Sloop
      - Sloppy
    - Fujino Parthia
    - Parthian Plain
  - Istanbul
    - Khalif
      - Khaleben
        - Colourful Gambler
  - Proud Chieftain
    - House Proud
    - Owen Anthony
      - Cannon King
  - Persian Lancer
  - Perspex
  - Idle Hour
    - Figonero
      - Patrick McFig
    - Vincitore
    - Farley
  - Persian Wonder
    - Shah Abbas
    - Pedlar
    - Majestic Crown
    - Archangel
    - Mithra
    - Big Swinger
    - Great Sun
    - Supreme Charger
    - Ton Up
  - Beau Persan
  - Gulf Pearl
    - Deep Diver
      - Challenger Trench
      - Deep Run
    - Proof Positive
    - Portese
    - Sea Chimes
  - Persian War
  - Cornelscourt
    - Royale
  - Shogun
    - Shamrock

== Pedigree ==
Pedigree of Persian Gulf (GB), bay stallion, 1940
Sire Bahram (GB) 1932	Blandford (IRE); 1919	Swynford	John o'Gaunt
Sire Bahram (GB) 1932	Blandford (IRE); 1919	Swynford	Canterbury Pilgrim
Sire Bahram (GB) 1932	Blandford (IRE); 1919	Blanche	White Eagle
Sire Bahram (GB) 1932	Blandford (IRE); 1919	Blanche	Black Cherry
Sire Bahram (GB) 1932	Friar's Daughter (GB); 1921	Friar Marcus	Cicero
Sire Bahram (GB) 1932	Friar's Daughter (GB); 1921	Friar Marcus	Prim Nun
Sire Bahram (GB) 1932	Friar's Daughter (GB); 1921	Garron Lass	Roseland
Sire Bahram (GB) 1932	Friar's Daughter (GB); 1921	Garron Lass	Concertina
Dam Double Life (IRE) 1926	Bachelor's Double (GB); 1906	Tredennis	Kendal
Dam Double Life (IRE) 1926	Bachelor's Double (GB); 1906	Tredennis	St Marguerite
Dam Double Life (IRE) 1926	Bachelor's Double (GB); 1906	Lady Bawn	Le Noir
Dam Double Life (IRE) 1926	Bachelor's Double (GB); 1906	Lady Bawn	Milady
Dam Double Life (IRE) 1926	Saint Joan (GB); 1918	Willbrook	Grebe
Dam Double Life (IRE) 1926	Saint Joan (GB); 1918	Willbrook	Nora Gough
Dam Double Life (IRE) 1926	Saint Joan (GB); 1918	Flo Desmond	Desmond
Dam Double Life (IRE) 1926	Saint Joan (GB); 1918	Flo Desmond	Flighty Flo (Family:2-i)
