= Zabara (horse) =

British Thoroughbred racehorse

- Sire: Persian Gulf
- Grandsire: Bahram
- Dam: Samovar
- Damsire: Caerleon
- Sex: Mare
- Foaled: 1949
- Country: United Kingdom
- Colour: Chestnut
- Breeder: Lady Wyfold
- Owner: Sir Malcolm McAlpine
- Trainer: Vic Smyth
- Record: 9: 6-3-0
- Earnings: £28,847

Major wins
- Imperial Produce Stakes (1951); Cheveley Park Stakes (1951); 1000 Guineas (1952); Lingfield Oaks Trial (1952); Coronation Stakes (1952)

Awards
- Top-rated British two-year-old filly (1951); Timeform top-rated two-year-old filly (1951); Timeform rating 134

Zabara (1949–1972) was a British Thoroughbred racehorse and broodmare best known for winning the classic 1000 Guineas in 1952. She was one of the leading European two-year-olds when her three wins included the Cheveley Park Stakes. In the following year she won the Guineas the Lingfield Oaks Trial and the Coronation Stakes as well as finishing second in the Oaks Stakes. Zabara was retired to stud where she proved to be an influential broodmare. She died in 1972 at the age of twenty-three.

== Background ==
Zabara was a small, light-coloured chestnut mare with a white blaze bred by Lady Wyfold. In December 1949, the filly was sent as a foal to the sales at Doncaster but was not sold as she failed to reach her reserve price of 2,000 guineas. She was later bought privately on behalf of Sir Malcolm McAlpine and sent into training with Vic Smyth at Epsom.

Zabara's sire Persian Gulf won the Coronation Cup in 1944 and went on to be a successful sire. Apart from Zabara, his most notable offspring was The Derby winner Parthia. Her dam Samovar, was a successful racehorse, winning the Queen Mary Stakes in 1942. She later became an influential broodmare: apart from Zabara's descendants, she was also the direct female-line ancestor of Frankel, Desert King and Don't Forget Me.

== Racing career ==
=== 1951: two-year-old season ===
On her racecourse debut, Zabara won the Guernsey Stud Produce Stakes at Birmingham Racecourse and was then moved up in class for the Lowther Stakes over five furlongs at York in which she finished second to Constantia. Zabara then contested the Imperial Produce Stakes at Kempton Park Racecourse and won from Lady Sophia and the colt Muckle Heart. On her final appearance of the season she ran in the Cheveley Park Stakes, Britain's most prestigious race for two-year-old fillies over six-furlongs at Newmarket. Ridden by the champion jockey Gordon Richards, she started at odds of 10/11 and led from the start to win by four lengths from Esquilla and Queen of Light. In the Free Handicap, a rating of the best two-year-olds to have raced in Britain she was ranked second, five pounds below the Irish-trained colt Windy City.

=== 1952: three-year-old season ===
Zabara began her second season in the 1000 Guineas Trial at Kempton Park. She was beaten five lengths by Lady Sophia when less than fully fit. At Newmarket on 3 May she was one of twenty fillies to contest the 1000 Guineas over the Rowley Mile course. She started at odds of 7/1 and was ridden by Ken Gethin as McAlpine's usual jockey Bill Rickaby was claimed to ride Primavera for his principal employer, Jack Jarvis. The Yorkshire-trained filly Frieze made the running before being overtaken two furlongs from the finish by Zabara and the French-trained favourite La Mirambule. The two pulled well clear of the rest of the field, with Zabara prevailing in a "most impressive manner" by half a length, with a gap of five lengths back to Refreshed and Frieze. Zabara was then moved up in distance and won the Oaks Trial over one and a half miles at Lingfield Park on 18 May.

On 30 May Zabara started second favourite at odds of 9/2 for the Oaks Stakes at her home course of Epsom Downs Racecourse. In the build-up to the race Smyth was able to work the filly over the course and was satisfied that she would handle both the gradients and the firm ground: he said that she had "never been better". She finished second of the nineteen runners, beaten three lengths by Frieze. At Royal Ascot Zabara was brought back in distance and won the Coronation Stakes over one mile at odds of 6/5.

== Assessment ==
As noted above, Zabara was the top-rated filly in the 1951 Free Handicap and the second-highest-rated two-year-old to run in Britain. In the same year the independent Timeform organisation awarded the filly a rating of 134, which remains one of the highest ever for a two-year-old filly. As a three-year-old she was rated on 128 by Timeform. In their book A Century of Champions, based on a modified version of the Timeform system John Randall and Tony Morris rated Zabara a "superior" winner of the 1000 Guineas and the twelfth best two-year-old filly of the 20th century trained in Britain or Ireland.

== Stud career ==
Zabara was retired to stud at the end of her three-year-old season. In December 1959 Zabara (in foal to Never Say Die) was offered for sale at Newmarket where she was bought for 29,000 guineas by Robin McAlpine, Sir Malcolm McAlpine's younger brother. She was not an immediate success at stud, producing only three minor winners and her record was described as "disappointing" in 1978. In more recent times, however, her legacy has become more notable as her daughters descendants included Circus Plume, Mtoto and the Prix du Jockey Club winner Blue Canari.

== Pedigree ==
Pedigree of Zabara (GB), chestnut mare, 1949
Sire Persian Gulf (GB) 1940	Bahram (GB); 1932	Blandford	Swynford
Sire Persian Gulf (GB) 1940	Bahram (GB); 1932	Blandford	Blanche
Sire Persian Gulf (GB) 1940	Bahram (GB); 1932	Friar's Daughter	Friar Marcus
Sire Persian Gulf (GB) 1940	Bahram (GB); 1932	Friar's Daughter	Garron Lass
Sire Persian Gulf (GB) 1940	Double Life (GB); 1926	Bachelors Double	Tredennis
Sire Persian Gulf (GB) 1940	Double Life (GB); 1926	Bachelors Double	Lady Bawn
Sire Persian Gulf (GB) 1940	Double Life (GB); 1926	Saint Joan	Willbrook
Sire Persian Gulf (GB) 1940	Double Life (GB); 1926	Saint Joan	Flo Desmond
Dam Samovar (GB) 1940	Caerleon (GB); 1927	Phalaris	Polymelus
Dam Samovar (GB) 1940	Caerleon (GB); 1927	Phalaris	Bromus
Dam Samovar (GB) 1940	Caerleon (GB); 1927	Canyon	Chaucer
Dam Samovar (GB) 1940	Caerleon (GB); 1927	Canyon	Glasalt
Dam Samovar (GB) 1940	Carolina (GB); 1929	Embargo	Argosy
Dam Samovar (GB) 1940	Carolina (GB); 1929	Embargo	Elland
Dam Samovar (GB) 1940	Carolina (GB); 1929	Georgia	Jingling Geordie
Dam Samovar (GB) 1940	Carolina (GB); 1929	Georgia	Usaa (Family: 1-k)
