= Ginevra (horse) =

British-bred Thoroughbred racehorse

- Racing silks of Charles St. George and Peter Richards
- Sire: Shantung
- Grandsire: Sicambre
- Dam: Zest
- Damsire: Crepello
- Sex: Mare
- Foaled: 1969
- Country: United Kingdom
- Colour: Bay
- Breeder: Earl of Suffolk
- Owner: 1) Charles St. George and Peter Richards; 2) T. Hoshikawa (Mrs. Asano)
- Trainer: Ryan Price
- Record: 10: 4 wins
- Earnings: £46, 141

Major wins
- Epsom Oaks (1972); Ladbrokes Oaks Trial (1972)

Ginevra (1969 – 18 March 1982) was a British Thoroughbred racehorse and broodmare best known for winning the 1972 Epsom Oaks. After winning two minor races as a two-year-old she improved in 1972 to win the Ladbrokes Oaks Trial before taking the Oaks. She went on to finish third in the Yorkshire Oaks and the St Leger. At the end of the year she was sold to a Japanese breeding syndicate and exported to Japan. Ginevra did not produce any notable offspring, although two of her daughters had some success as broodmares.

== Background ==
Ginevra was foaled at the Earl of Suffolk's stud in Gloucestershire. Her sire, Shantung, was a winner of the 1959 Prix La Rochette, the Prix Edgard de la Charme and was the second leading sire in France in 1969. Ginevra's dam, Zest, was an unsuccessful racehorse that was bought by the Earl of Suffolk in 1967 for 1,200 guineas. Ginevra was entered in the Newmarket Houghton sale as a yearling in 1970 but failed to make her reserve price of 2,500 guineas, the bidding having stopped at 1,300 guineas. She was later sold privately to the racing partnership of St. George and Richards for 2,000 guineas.

Ginevra was a bay filly with no white markings. Trained by Ryan Price throughout her career, Ginevra had a difficult and unpredictable personality. She was prone to escaping from her paddock and once jumped the fence three days before the running of the Oaks to graze on a nearby carriageway. Price often had to chase after her himself, noting, "You never knew which direction she was going to go. I must have walked hundreds of miles after the bitch."

== Racing career ==
=== 1971: two-year-old season ===
Ginevra ran five times as a two-year-old. She won a minor race at Newmarket Racecourse in early June and finished third to Padrona in the Cherry Hinton Stakes at the same course later that month. Ridden by Lester Piggott Ginevra was unplaced in the Knavesmire Nursery Handicap in October at York. In October at Ascot, Ginevra beat Grey Gaston and Carcosa in the Tankerville Nursery Handicap. In the Free Handicap, a rating of the best juveniles to race in Britain, she was allotted a weight of 113 pounds, 20 pounds behind the top-rated colt Crowned Prince and fourteen pounds behind the top-rated filly Rose Dubarry.

=== 1972: three-year-old season ===
Ginevra began her second season by finishing unplaced in a handicap race but then won the Ladbrokes Oaks Trial at Lingfield Park in May 1972. On 10 June, Ginevra started in the Oaks Stakes at 8-1 odds, the race favourite being Arkadina (the future dam of Irish St. Leger winner Dark Lomond). Ridden by Tony Murray, Ginevra was last of the field for the first half mile until six furlongs from the finish whereby she rapidly passed second-place finisher Regal Exception to win easily by 1.5 lengths. Murray commented on the difficulty of training Ginevra after the running, "She has been a most difficult filly to train. The captain [Ryan Price] has handled her in miraculous fashion throughout and spent a tremendous amount of time on her. I have never seen a feat of training to equal this."

Ginevra was beaten in her three remaining races. She finished third to Attica Meli in the Yorkshire Oaks in August and then took third place behind the colts Boucher and Our Mirage in the St Leger Stakes at Doncaster Racecourse in September. Shipped to Longchamp Racecourse in September for her last career start, Ginevra finished a disappointing fourth to San San and Paysanne in the Prix Vermeille.

== Breeding career ==
Ginevra was retired from racing at the end of her three-year-old season and was sold to a Japanese breeding syndicate for 106,000 guineas at the December Sales. She was the first British Classic winner just out of training that had been sold at the December Sales since Festoon was sold in 1954. Ginevra did not produce successful racers in Japan and died at the Yoshida Stud Farm on 18 March 1982 while foaling her last foal, Mrs. Ginevra.

=== Foals ===
- Kyoei Monarch, 1977, bay colt by Contrite. Winless in two starts in 1981.
- Grand Prima, 1978, bay filly by Contrite. Two wins from 11 starts. Produced the multiple stakes winner Tsukino Maihime (Gifu Okan Sho and Gifu Kin Sho).
- Ginevra O, 1979, bay colt by My Swallow. Seven wins from 15 starts.
- Unnamed colt, 1980, by Contrite. Died young.
- Mrs. Ginevra, 1982, bay filly by Contrite. Unraced. Produced the multiple stakes winner Type Swallow (Kaisetsu Kinen and Oguri Cap Kinen).

== Pedigree ==
Pedigree of Ginevra (GB), Bay Filly, 1969
Sire Shantung (FR) Brown, 1956	Sicambre; Brown, 1948	Prince Bio	Prince Rose
Sire Shantung (FR) Brown, 1956	Sicambre; Brown, 1948	Prince Bio	Biologie
Sire Shantung (FR) Brown, 1956	Sicambre; Brown, 1948	Sif	Rialto
Sire Shantung (FR) Brown, 1956	Sicambre; Brown, 1948	Sif	Suavita
Sire Shantung (FR) Brown, 1956	Barley Corn (GB); Bay, 1950	Hyperion	Gainsborough
Sire Shantung (FR) Brown, 1956	Barley Corn (GB); Bay, 1950	Hyperion	Selene
Sire Shantung (FR) Brown, 1956	Barley Corn (GB); Bay, 1950	Schiaparelli	Schiavoni
Sire Shantung (FR) Brown, 1956	Barley Corn (GB); Bay, 1950	Schiaparelli	Aileen
Dam Zest (GB) Bay, 1961	Crepello; Chestnut, 1954	Donatello	Blenheim
Dam Zest (GB) Bay, 1961	Crepello; Chestnut, 1954	Donatello	Delleana
Dam Zest (GB) Bay, 1961	Crepello; Chestnut, 1954	Crepuscule	Mieuxce
Dam Zest (GB) Bay, 1961	Crepello; Chestnut, 1954	Crepuscule	Red Sunset
Dam Zest (GB) Bay, 1961	Mary Brandon; Bay, 1949	Owen Tudor	Hyperion
Dam Zest (GB) Bay, 1961	Mary Brandon; Bay, 1949	Owen Tudor	Mary Tudor
Dam Zest (GB) Bay, 1961	Mary Brandon; Bay, 1949	Nipotina	Felicitation
Dam Zest (GB) Bay, 1961	Mary Brandon; Bay, 1949	Nipotina	Figliastra (Family 3-d)

- Ginevra was inbred 3 × 4 to Hyperion, meaning that this stallion appears in both the third and fourth generations of her pedigree
