= Parthia (horse) =

British-bred Thoroughbred racehorse

- Sire: Persian Gulf
- Grandsire: Bahram
- Dam: Lightning
- Damsire: Hyperion
- Sex: Stallion
- Foaled: 1956
- Country: United Kingdom
- Colour: Bay
- Breeder: Sir Humphrey de Trafford
- Owner: Sir Humphrey de Trafford
- Trainer: Cecil Boyd-Rochfort
- Record: 12: 6-2-1
- Earnings: £43,786 (win prize money)

Major wins
- Dee Stakes (1958); Lingfield Derby Trial (1958); Epsom Derby (1959); Jockey Club Cup (1960); Paradise Stakes (1960)

Parthia (1956–1982) was a British Thoroughbred racehorse and sire. In a career that lasted from October 1958 to July 1960 he ran twelve times, winning six races, four of which are now Group races. His most notable success came in the 1959 Epsom Derby. He went on to have a successful stud career in Great Britain and Japan.

== Background ==
Parthia was a bay horse bred in England by his owner Sir Humphrey de Trafford. He was trained throughout his career by the veteran Captain (later Sir) Cecil Boyd-Rochfort at his Freemason Lodge Stable at Newmarket, Suffolk.

Parthia’s sire Persian Gulf won the Coronation Cup in 1944 and went on to be a successful sire. Apart from Parthia, his most notable offspring was the 1000 Guineas winner Zabara. His dam, Lightning won one race and was a half sister of Alcide. Alcide, who ran for the same owner and trainer as Parthia, had been the ante-post favourite for the 1958 Derby but was withdrawn from the race after being “got at” (deliberately injured) in his stable.

== Racing career ==
=== 1958: two-year-old season ===
Parthia was slow to mature and did not appear on the racecourse until the October of his two-year-old season. He finished sixth on his debut in a race at Hurst Park, but then showed considerable improvement to run third in the Dewhurst Stakes at Newmarket.

=== 1959: three-year-old season ===
At three, Parthia was targeted at the Derby from early in the season and was entered in recognised trial races for the Epsom Classic. He began by winning the White Rose Stakes at Hurst Park in April and was then sent to Chester where he won the Dee Stakes in May. His preparation for the Derby was completed by a victory in the Lingfield Derby Trial. Although he had won his first three starts he had not been particularly impressive, running in a "lazy" fashion and doing just enough to win in each case.

In the Derby he started at odds of 10/1 in a field of twenty on an unusually hot day in front of a crowd which included the Queen and the Duke of Edinburgh. Ridden by Harry Carr he was always prominent and challenged the leader Fidalgo (ridden by Carr's son-in-law Joe Mercer) in the straight. He pulled ahead in the final furlong to win by one and a half lengths from Fidalgo, with the French-trained favourite Shantung third. Shantung was considered an unlucky loser: he had been virtually pulled-up by his jockey who feared he was injured, and finished strongly after being tailed-off in last place entering the straight.

Parthia suffered from a respiratory infection and began coughing after the Derby. He was off the racecourse for three months before returning in the St Leger. He started 8/13 favourite, but finished fourth behind the filly Cantelo sustaining an injury which ended his season.

=== 1960: four-year-old season ===
Parthia returned with two wins in the spring of 1960. He won the Jockey Club Cup (then run over one and a half miles) at Newmarket and the Paradise Stakes over fourteen furlongs at Hurst Park.

At Epsom he finished second to the outstanding filly Petite Etoile in the Coronation Cup and was then sent to Royal Ascot for the Hardwicke Stakes. He was expected to win but finished second, failing to concede six pounds to Aggressor after being forced to make much of the running.

On his final start he ran unplaced behind Aggressor and Petite Etoile in the King George VI and Queen Elizabeth Stakes at Ascot.

== Assessment ==
Timeform awarded Parthia a rating of 132 in 1959. A rating of 130 is considered the mark of an above average European Group One winner

In their book A Century of Champions, John Randall and Tony Morris rated Parthia an “average” Derby winner.

== Stud career ==
Parthia stood as a stallion in England until he was exported to Japan in 1968. The most notable of his European offspring was the filly Sleeping Partner who won The Oaks in 1969. In Japan he sired Fujino Parthia, winner of the Tenno Sho in autumn 1975 and the Takarazuka Kinen in 1976. Parthia died in Japan in 1982.

== Sire line tree ==
- Parthia
  - Um Said
  - Djelo Binza
  - Greek God
  - Sloop
    - Sloppy
  - Fujino Parthia
  - Parthian Plain

== Pedigree ==
Pedigree of Parthia (GB), bay stallion, 1956
Sire Persian Gulf (GB) 1940	Bahram; 1932	Blandford	Swynford
Sire Persian Gulf (GB) 1940	Bahram; 1932	Blandford	Blanche
Sire Persian Gulf (GB) 1940	Bahram; 1932	Friar’s Daughter	Friar Marcus
Sire Persian Gulf (GB) 1940	Bahram; 1932	Friar’s Daughter	Garron Lass
Sire Persian Gulf (GB) 1940	Double Life; 1926	Bachelors Double	Tredennis
Sire Persian Gulf (GB) 1940	Double Life; 1926	Bachelors Double	Lady Bawn
Sire Persian Gulf (GB) 1940	Double Life; 1926	Saint Joan	Willbrook
Sire Persian Gulf (GB) 1940	Double Life; 1926	Saint Joan	Flo Desmond
Dam Lightning (GB)1950	Hyperion; 1930	Gainsborough	Bayardo
Dam Lightning (GB)1950	Hyperion; 1930	Gainsborough	Rosedrop
Dam Lightning (GB)1950	Hyperion; 1930	Selene	Chaucer
Dam Lightning (GB)1950	Hyperion; 1930	Selene	Serenissima
Dam Lightning (GB)1950	Chenille; 1940	King Salmon	Salmon Trout
Dam Lightning (GB)1950	Chenille; 1940	King Salmon	Malva
Dam Lightning (GB)1950	Chenille; 1940	Sweet Aloe	Cameronian
Dam Lightning (GB)1950	Chenille; 1940	Sweet Aloe	Aloe(Family: 2-f)
