= Honeylight =

British-bred Thoroughbred racehorse

- Sire: Honeyway
- Grandsire: Fairway
- Dam: Crepuscule
- Damsire: Mieuxce
- Sex: Mare
- Foaled: 1953
- Country: United Kingdom
- Colour: Bay
- Breeder: Victor Sassoon
- Owner: Victor Sassoon
- Trainer: Charles Elsey
- Record: 11: 5-0-2 (incomplete)

Major wins
- Free Handicap (1956); 1000 Guineas (1956)

Awards
- Timeform rating 125 (1956)

Honeylight (1953 – after 1972) was a British Thoroughbred racehorse and broodmare. She showed promise as a juvenile in 1955 when she won three of her six races. She reached her peak in the following spring when she won the Free Handicap and the took the 1000 Guineas. She never won again but finished fourth in the Epsom Oaks and third in the Yorkshire Oaks before being retired from racing at the end of the year. She had some success as a broodmare.

== Background ==
Honeylight was a bay mare bred and owned by Victor Sassoon. During her racing career she was trained by Charles Elsey at his Highfield Stable in Malton, North Yorkshire. Her regular jockey Edgar Britt described her as a "placid and gentle" horse.

Honeylight was sired by Honeyway, a top class racehorse whose wins included the July Cup, Cork and Orrery Stakes and Champion Stakes. As a breeding stallion he initially had fertility problem but sired many good winners including Great Nephew. Honeylight's dam Crepuscule won only one minor race, but was an exceptional broodmare, who went on to produce Crepello and Twilight Alley.

== Racing career ==
=== 1955: two-year-old season ===
Honeylight ran six times as a juvenile in 1955 and won three times over the minimum distance of five furlongs. She was among the first three finishers on two of her other starts and was regarded as a speedy and consistent performer, but some way below the best of her generation.

=== 1956: three-year-old season ===
Honeylight began her second campaign by winning the Free Handicap over seven furlongs at Newmarket in April. The 143rd running of the 1000 Guineas over the Rowley Mile on 4 May attracted a field of 19 runners with the Princess Elizabeth Stakes winner Victoria Cross starting favourite ahead of the French challenger Midget while Honeylight, ridden by Edgar Britt, went off at odds of 100/6 (approximately 16.7/1). Eighteen of the fillies raced up the stands side (the left-hand side from the jockeys' viewpoint) whilst Midget raced alone on the far side of the wide, straight course. Honeylight went to the front soon after the start and came home well clear of the stands side group and two lengths clear of Midget, whose jockey Roger Poincelet misjudged the finish and believed that he had won comfortably. Third place went to Honeylight's stablemate Arletta.

Edgar Britt was again in the saddle when Honeylight was stepped up in distance for the Epsom Oaks over one and a half miles on 8 June. She started the 11/2 second choice in the betting and finished fourth of the fourteen runners behind Sicarelle. After a two month break, she returned for the Yorkshire Oaks at York Racecourse in August and finished third behind Indian Twilight and Kandy Sauce. For her final start she was brought back in distance and finished third in the Straitlace Stakes over one mile at Doncaster Racecourse.

== Assessment and honours ==
The independent Timeform organisation gave Honeylight a rating 125 in 1956.

In their book, A Century of Champions, based on the Timeform rating system, John Randall and Tony Morris rated Honeylight an "inferior" winner of the 1000 Guineas.

== Breeding record ==
Honeylight was retired from racing to become a broodmare for her owner's stud. She produced at least nine foals and three winners between 1959 and 1972:

- Ribotlight, a bay colt, foaled in 1959, sired by Ribot. Winner.
- Come On Honey, chestnut filly, 1960, by Never Say Die. Dam of Attica Meli
- Honey Moss, bay filly, 1961, by Ballymoss
- Paddys Light, bay colt, 1963, by St Paddy. Winner.
- Hessonite, chestnut colt, 1965, by Princely Gift
- Mr Halo, chestnut colt, 1967, by St Paddy
- Honeystar, chestnut filly, 1968, by Primera
- Keeven, chestnut colt, 1970, by St Paddy
- Illumination, chestnut filly, 1972, by St Paddy. Winner.

== Pedigree ==
Pedigree of Honeylight (GB), bay mare, 1953
Sire Honeyway (GB) 1941	Fairway; 1925	Phalaris	Polymelus
Sire Honeyway (GB) 1941	Fairway; 1925	Phalaris	Bromus
Sire Honeyway (GB) 1941	Fairway; 1925	Scapa Flow	Chaucer
Sire Honeyway (GB) 1941	Fairway; 1925	Scapa Flow	Anchora
Sire Honeyway (GB) 1941	Honey Buzzard; 1931	Papyrus	Tracery (USA)
Sire Honeyway (GB) 1941	Honey Buzzard; 1931	Papyrus	Miss Matty
Sire Honeyway (GB) 1941	Honey Buzzard; 1931	Lady Peregrine	White Eagle
Sire Honeyway (GB) 1941	Honey Buzzard; 1931	Lady Peregrine	Lisma
Dam Crepuscule (GB) 1948	Mieuxce (FR); 1933	Massine	Consols
Dam Crepuscule (GB) 1948	Mieuxce (FR); 1933	Massine	Mauri
Dam Crepuscule (GB) 1948	Mieuxce (FR); 1933	L'Olivete	Opott
Dam Crepuscule (GB) 1948	Mieuxce (FR); 1933	L'Olivete	Jonicole
Dam Crepuscule (GB) 1948	Red Sunset; 1941	Solario (IRE)	Gainsborough (GB)
Dam Crepuscule (GB) 1948	Red Sunset; 1941	Solario (IRE)	Sun Worship (GB)
Dam Crepuscule (GB) 1948	Red Sunset; 1941	Dulce (FR)	Asterus
Dam Crepuscule (GB) 1948	Red Sunset; 1941	Dulce (FR)	Dorina (Family 16-d)
