= Ebor Handicap =

Flat horse race in Britain

- Class: Class 2
- Location: York Racecourse; York, England
- Inaugurated: 1843
- Race type: Flat
- Sponsor: Sky Bet
- Website: York

Race information
- Distance: 1m 5f 188yd (2,787 metres)
- Surface: Turf
- Track: Left-handed
- Qualification: Four-years-old and up
- Weight: Handicap
- Purse: £500,000 (2025); 1st: £300,000 Automatic entry to Melbourne Cup

Ebor Handicap
2026
Daiquiri Bay	Hopewell Rock	Opportunity

Previous years
2025
Ethical Diamond	Ascending	Queenstown
2024
Magical Zoe	Kihavah	Oneforthegutter
2023
Absurde	Sweet William	Live Your Dream
2022
Trawlerman	Alfred Boucher	Earl Of Tyrone
2021
Sonnyboyliston	Quickthorn	Alounak

2020-2011
2020
Fujaira Prince	Glencadam Glory	Verdana Blue
2019
Mustajeer	Red Galileo	Desert Skyline
2018
Muntahaa	Weekender	Sea The Lion
2017
Nakeeta	Flymetothestars	Natural Scenery
2016
Heartbreak City	Shrewd	Quick Jack
2015
Litigant	Wicklow Brave	Suegioo
2014
Mutual Regard	Van Percy	Elidor
2013
Tiger Cliff	Genzy	Number Theory
2012
Willing Foe	Royal Diamond	Number Theory
2011
Moyenne Corniche	Tactician	Investissement

2010-2001
2010
Dirar	Rosika	Bridge Of Gold
2009
Sesenta	Changingoftheguard	Hits Only Vic
2008
All The Good	Tropical Strait	Yellowstone
2007
Purple Moon	Honolulu	Scriptwriter
2006
Mudawin	Glistening	Young Mick
2005
Sergeant Cecil	Carte Diamond	Grampian
2004
Mephisto	Gold Ring	Mikado
2003
Saint Alebe	Sun Bird	Salsalino
2002
Hugs Dancer	Pole Star	Barathea Blazer
2001
Mediterranean	Foreign Affairs	Brother Joe

2000-1991
2000
Give The Slip	Boreas	Virgin Soldier
1999
Vicious Circle	Travelmate	Mowbray
1998
Tuning	Sheer Danzig	Yavana's Pace
1997
Far Ahead	Media Star	Puce
1996
Clerkenwell	Beauchamp Jade	Corradini
1995
Sanmartino	Midyan Blue	Foundry Lane
1994
Hasten To Add	Admiral's Well	Solartica
1993
Sarawat	Oh So Risky	Dreams End
1992
Quick Ransom	Brier Creek	Steerforth
1991
Deposki	Roll A Dollar	Tidemark

1990-1988
1990
Further Flight	Bean King	Holy Zeal
1989
Sapience	Bush Hill	Horn Dance
1988
Kneller	Raslaan	Tender Type

The Ebor Handicap is a flat handicap horse race in Great Britain open to horses aged four years or older. It is run at York over a distance of 1 mile 5 furlongs and 188 yards (2,787 metres). It is scheduled to take place each year in August.

== History ==
The event is named after the shortened form of Eboracum, the Roman name for York. It was first run in 1843, and it was originally known as the Great Ebor Handicap. The race was introduced by John Orton, a newly appointed Clerk of the Course at York. It was initially contested over 2 miles (3.2 km), but its distance was later cut by 2 furlongs.

The planned running of the Ebor Handicap in 2008 was abandoned because of a waterlogged track. It was replaced by an event at Newbury called the Newburgh Handicap, a reference to the town's original Norman name.

The race is now held on the final day of York's four-day Ebor Festival meeting, and it is the most valuable flat handicap in Europe. The prize money was increased to £500,000 from the 2018 running and then to £1,000,000 from 2019, making it the first British handicap race worth £1,000,000. In connection with the prize money increase three-year-olds were excluded from the race from the 2019 running. The prize money for the 2020 running of the race was reduced, in line with similar reductions in prize money of all British horse racing, due in part to the COVID-19 pandemic.

== Records ==
Most successful horse (2 wins):

- Flint Jack – 1922, 1923

Leading jockey (5 wins):

- Lester Piggott – Gladness (1958), Primera (1959), Die Hard (1961), Tintagel II (1970), Jupiter Island (1983)

Leading trainer (5 wins):

- Tom Dawson – Godfrey (1844), Mark Tapley (1850), Pax (1860), Makeshift (1862), Mandrake (1867)

== Winners since 1900 ==
- Weights given in stones and pounds.

Year	Winner	Age	Weight	Jockey	Trainer	SP	Time
1900	Jiffy II	5	8-04	Johnny Reiff	John Huggins	4/1	3:01.60
1901	Gyp	6	8-05	Otto Madden	Philip Peebles	5/1	2:59.20
1902	Wargrave	4	8-02	James Hare	Harry Batho	20/1	3:01.40
1903	McYardley	5			Gilbert
1904	Warwolf	5	7-09	Billy Higgs	Sullivan	Evens	3:03.00
1905	The Page	5	7-06	Billy Higgs	Sullivan	5/1	3:03.20
1906	Golden Measure	4	8-05	Danny Maher	Major Edwards	7/4 F
1907	Wuffy	4	7-12	Herbert Randall	Captain Robert Dewhurst	4/1
1908	Rousay	4	8-12	William Halsey	Tom Jennings Jr.	11/8 F	3:05.60
1909	Dibs	4	8-00	Billy Higgs	Charles Nugent	9/2	3:04.60
1910	Claretoi	6	6-10	Charles Ringstead	J D Edwards	40/1	3:02.00
1911	Pillo	6	8-09	William Saxby	Jack Robinson	100/12	2:58.00
1912	Election	5	7-04	William Huxley	J Dawson	10/1	3:17.80
1913	Junior	4	9-00	William Huxley	Etienne de Mestre	2/1 F	2:58.00
1914-18	no race
1919	Race Rock	7	7-07	Freddy Lane	Thomas Cannon Jr.	14/1	3:03.80
1920	Iron Hand	4	6-12	Edgar Crickmere	Fergusson	100/8	3:01.00
1921	March Along	4	9-01	Bernard Carslake	George Lambton	100/7	2:58.00
1922	Flint Jack	5	8-09	George Smith	Ossie Bell	5/1	3:05.00
1923	Flint Jack	6	8-12	Hector Gray	Ossie Bell	10/1	3:03.80
1924	Marvex	4	8-05	Ted Gardner	Tash	10/1	3:08.40
1925	Chapeau	5	7-06	Gordon Richards	Otto Madden	8/1	2:57.60
1926	Pons Asinorum	4	8-10	Harry Wragg	Walter Earl	5/2 F	2:59.60
1927	Cap-a-Pie	3	6-07	William Freeman	Frank Butters	100/7	3:07.80
1928	Cinq a Sept	4	8-04	Joe Childs	Cecil Boyd-Rochfort	15/2	3:01.60
1929	Bonny Boy II	5	8-01	Tommy Weston	Peter Gilpin	100/8	2:56.20
1930 (dh)	Coaster; Gentlemen's Relish	4; 4	8-00; 7-05	Freddie Fox; Johnny Dines	Fred Templeman; Atty Persse	100/8; 20/1	3:01.40
1931	Brown Jack	7	9-05	Steve Donoghue	Ivor Anthony	10/1	3:02.80
1932	Cat o'Nine Tails	5	7-08	Gordon Richards	Jack Colling	9/1	2:56.20
1933	Dictum	5	7-04	Johnny Dines	Tom Rimell	8/1	2:58.20
1934	Alcazar	3	8-05	Joe Childs	Cecil Boyd-Rochfort	10/1	2:59.20
1935	Museum	3	7-13	Steve Donoghue	Jack Rogers	100/8	2:58.60
1936	Penny Royal	3	7-09	Gordon Richards	Fred Templeman	100/8	2:58.60
1937	Weathervane	4	7-10	Tommy Weston	Joseph Lawson	100/6	2:57.20
1938	Foxglove II	3	8-01	Gordon Richards	Fred Darling	8/1	2:56.60
1939	Owenstown	5	8-08	Joseph Taylor	Matthew Peacock	11/2 F	2:57.00
1940-42	no race
1943 (Note: The 1943 and 1944 runnings took place at Pontefract over 1 mile, 4 furlongs)	Yorkshire Hussar	4	8-07	Geoff Littlewood	Charles Elsey	100/6	2:41.00
1944	The Kernal	4	7-08	Percy Evans	G F Oxtoby	100/8	2:43.80
1945	Wayside Inn	3	8-06	Harry Wragg	Walter Earl	20/1	2:56.60
1946	Foxtrot	3	7-13	Edgar Britt	Ted Lambton	3/1 F	3:04.80
1947	Procne	4	8-04	Joe Sime	Charles Elsey	8/1	2:55.40
1948	Donino	4	8-12	Joe Sime	A Cooper	100/7	2:58.60
1949	Miraculous Atom	5	8-11	Billy Nevett	Sam Hall	100/7	2:55.60
1950	Cadzow Oak	4	7-12	Jimmy Thompson	Joe Thwaites	100/8	2:58.80
1951	Bob	4	6-12	Ted Carter	Charles Elsey	8/1	2:57.60
1952	Signification	3	7-12	Herbert Jones	Jack Pearce	10/1	2:56.40
1953	Norooz	4	8-04	Snowy Fawdon	Marcus Marsh	100/9	2:55.80
1954	By Thunder!	3	6-12	Wally Swinburn	Sam Armstrong	7/1	3:24.60
1955	Hyperion Kid	3	7-02	Peter Robinson	Harry Wragg	100/8	2:57.40
1956	Donald	3	7-10	Doug Smith	Jack Jarvis	5/1 F	3:09.00
1957	Morecambe	4	7-09	Joe Sime	Sam Hall	100/8	3:05.00
1958	Gladness	5	9-07	Lester Piggott	Vincent O'Brien	5/1 F	3:02.40
1959	Primera	5	9-00	Lester Piggott	Noel Murless	6/1	2:57.80
1960	Persian Road	5	8-04	George Moore	Jeremy Tree	18/1	3:01.40
1961	Die Hard	4	8-09	Lester Piggott	Vincent O'Brien	11/2 F	2:58.80
1962	Sostenuto	4	8-10	Donald Morris	Bill Elsey	9/1	3:02.80
1963	Partholon	3	7-08	Joe Sime	Tommy Shaw	100/6	3:06.80
1964	Proper Pride	5	7-11	Doug Smith	Walter Wharton	28/1	3:08.20
1965	Twelfth Man	4	7-05	Paul Cook	Harry Wragg	6/1 F	2:55.80
1966	Lomond	6	9-02	Eric Eldin	Ryan Jarvis	100/8	3:00.20
1967	Ovaltine	3	7-00	Ernie Johnson	Jack Watts	100/8	3:09.40
1968	Alignment	3	7-08	Ernie Johnson	Bill Elsey	9/1	3:04.00
1969	Big Hat	4	7-03	Ray Still	Dave Hanley	40/1	3:15.60
1970	Tintagel II	5	8-05	Lester Piggott	Richmond Sturdy	6/1 F	2:59.40
1971	Knotty Pine	5	8-07	Frankie Durr	Michael Jarvis	9/2 F	3:04.20
1972	Crazy Rhythm	4	8-06	Frankie Durr	Staff Ingham	19/2	2:54.50
1973	Bonne Noel	4	9-02	Christy Roche	Paddy Prendergast	4/1 F	3:05.35
1974	Anji	5	7-08	Terry McKeown	John Sutcliffe	20/1	2:58.06
1975	Dakota	4	9-04	Sandy Barclay	Sam Hall	7/1	3:02.81
1976	Sir Montagu	3	8-00	Willie Carson	Ryan Price	11/4 F	2:57.33
1977	Move Off	4	8-01	Jimmy Bleasdale	Jack Calvert	9/1	2:59.39
1978	Totowah	4	8-01	Paul Cook	Michael Jarvis	20/1	2:58.27
1979	Sea Pigeon	9	10-00	Jonjo O'Neill	Peter Easterby	18/1	3:05.25
1980	Shaftesbury	4	8-05	Greville Starkey	Michael Stoute	12/1	3:01.25
1981	Protection Racket	3	8-01	Mark Birch	Jeremy Hindley	15/2	3:02.76
1982	Another Sam	5	9-02	Brian Rouse	Richard Hannon Sr.	16/1	3:02.64
1983	Jupiter Island	4	9-00	Lester Piggott	Clive Brittain	9/1	3:01.30
1984	Crazy	3	8-13	Walter Swinburn	Guy Harwood	10/1	2:58.17
1985	Western Dancer	4	8-06	Paul Cook	Con Horgan	20/1	3:03.39
1986	Primary	3	8-07	Greville Starkey	Guy Harwood	6/1	2:55.34
1987	Daarkom	4	9-03	Michael Roberts	Alec Stewart	13/2	3:05.08
1988	Kneller	3	8-01	Paul Eddery	Henry Cecil	9/1	2:53.67
1989	Sapience	3	8-04	Pat Eddery	Jimmy FitzGerald	15/2	2:57.03
1990	Further Flight	4	8-08	Michael Hills	Barry Hills	7/1 JF	2:55.04
1991	Deposki	3	7-03	Franny Norton	Michael Stoute	12/1	3:03.48
1992	Quick Ransom	4	8-03	Dean McKeown	Mark Johnston	16/1	2:55.48
1993	Sarawat	5	8-02	Richard Quinn	Reg Akehurst	14/1	2:59.20
1994	Hasten to Add	4	9-03	George Duffield	Sir Mark Prescott	13/2 F	2:56.56
1995	Sanmartino	3	7-11	Willie Carson	Barry Hills	8/1	2:53.62
1996	Clerkenwell	3	7-11	Fergal Lynch	Michael Stoute	17/2	2:53.47
1997	Far Ahead	5	8-00	Tyrone Williams	Les Eyre	33/1	2:58.21
1998	Tuning	3	8-07	Kieren Fallon	Henry Cecil	9/2 F	2:51.89
1999	Vicious Circle	5	8-04	Kevin Darley	Luca Cumani	11/1	2:54.48
2000	Give the Slip	3	8-08	Pat Eddery	Amanda Perrett	8/1	2:55.62
2001	Mediterranean	3	8-04	Michael Kinane	Aidan O'Brien	16/1	2:55.85
2002	Hugs Dancer	5	8-05	Dean McKeown	James Given	25/1	2:55.12
2003	Saint Alebe	4	8-08	Richard Quinn	David Elsworth	20/1	2:54.96
2004	Mephisto	5	9-04	Darryll Holland	Luca Cumani	6/1	3:06.10
2005	Sergeant Cecil	6	8-12	Alan Munro	Rod Millman	11/1	2:54.56
2006	Mudawin	5	8-04	John Egan	Jane Chapple-Hyam	100/1	2:57.78
2007	Purple Moon	4	9-04	Jamie Spencer	Luca Cumani	7/2 F	2:59.26
2008 (Note: The 2008 running took place at Newbury over 1 mile, 5 furlongs and 61 yards)	All the Good	5	9-00	Dane O'Neill	Saeed bin Suroor	25/1	2:52.05
2009	Sesenta	5	8-08	Gary Carroll	Willie Mullins	25/1	2:57.52
2010	Dirar	5	9-01	Jamie Spencer	Gordon Elliott	14/1	2:57.13
2011	Moyenne Corniche	6	8-10	Dale Swift	Brian Ellison	25/1	3:01.60
2012	Willing Foe	5	9-02	Frankie Dettori	Saeed bin Suroor	12/1	3:00.75
2013	Tiger Cliff	4	9-00	Tom Queally	Lady Cecil	5/1	3:03.36
2014	Mutual Regard	5	9-04	Louis Steward	Johnny Murtagh	20/1	2:56.48
2015	Litigant	7	9-01	Oisin Murphy	Joseph Tuite	33/1	3:00.16
2016	Heartbreak City	6	9-01	Adam McNamara	Tony Martin	15/2	2:56.13
2017	Nakeeta	6	9-00	Callum Rodriguez	Iain Jardine	12/1	2:56.54
2018	Muntahaa	5	9-09	Jim Crowley	John Gosden	11/1	2:53.48
2019	Mustajeer	6	9-05	Colin Keane	Ger Lyons	16/1	2:52.97
2020	Fujaira Prince	6	9-08	Andrea Atzeni	Roger Varian	11/2	3:04.22
2021	Sonnyboyliston	4	9-08	Ben Coen	Johnny Murtagh	10/1	2:56.10
2022	Trawlerman	4	9-03	Frankie Dettori	John & Thady Gosden	9/1	2:58.03
2023	Absurde	5	9-07	Frankie Dettori	Willie Mullins	7/1	2:56.41
2024	Magical Zoe	6	9-06	Billy Lee	Henry De Bromhead	11/2 F	2:58.21
2025	Ethical Diamond	5	9-08	William Buick	Willie Mullins	5/1 F	2:59.16
2026	Daiquiri Bay	4	9-07	Rossa Ryan	Alan King	10/1	3:00.61

== Earlier winners ==
- 1843: Pagan
- 1844: Godfrey
- 1845: Coheiress
- 1846: Arthur
- 1847: Mathematician
- 1848: Meaux
- 1849: The Hero
- 1850: Mark Tapley
- 1851: Nancy
- 1852: Adine
- 1853: Pantomime
- 1854: The Grand Inquisitor
- 1855: Vandal
- 1856: Warlock
- 1857: El Hakim
- 1858: Vedette
- 1859: Underhand
- 1860: Pax
- 1861: Rising Sun
- 1862: Makeshift
- 1863: Golden Pledge
- 1864: Raglan
- 1865: Verdant
- 1866: Westwick
- 1867: Mandrake
- 1868: Fair Wind
- 1869: Fortunio
- 1870: Paganini
- 1871: Not Out
- 1872: Albert Victor
- 1873: Louise Victoria
- 1874: Chivalrous
- 1875: Lily Agnes
- 1876: Lilian
- 1877: Il Gladiatore
- 1878: Caerau
- 1879: Isonomy
- 1880: Novice
- 1881: Mother Shipton
- 1882: Victor Emanuel
- 1883: Corrie Roy
- 1884: Ben Alder
- 1885: Mate
- 1886: Le Caissier
- 1887: Silence
- 1888: Nappa
- 1889: King Monmouth
- 1890: Silver Spur
- 1891: Buccaneer
- 1892: Alice
- 1893: Senaputty
- 1894: Quilon
- 1895: Llanthony
- 1896: Dingle Bay
- 1897: Harvest Money
- 1898: Invincible II
- 1899: Cassock's Pride

== See also ==
- Horse racing in Great Britain
- List of British flat horse races
