= All the Good =

Irish-bred Thoroughbred racehorse

- Sire: Diesis
- Grandsire: Sharpen Up
- Dam: Zarara
- Damsire: Manila
- Sex: Stallion
- Foaled: 24 April 2003
- Country: Ireland
- Colour: Chestnut
- Breeder: Mount Coote Partnership
- Owner: Future in Mind Partnership; Godolphin Racing
- Trainer: Gerard Butler; Saeed bin Suroor
- Record: 23:7-2-0
- Earnings: £824,939

Major wins
- Totesport Newburgh (2008); Caulfield Cup (2008)
- Last updated on 31 May 2009

All The Good is an Irish-bred Thoroughbred racehorse who won the 2008 Australian Group 1 MRC Caulfield Cup over 2400 metres. He was ridden by Kerrin McEvoy and trained by Saeed bin Suroor for the Godolphin Racing stable. He had previously won the Totesport Newburgh, a substitute race for the 2008 Ebor Handicap.

== Pedigree ==
Pedigree of All the Good
Sire Diesis 1980	Sharpen Up 1969	Atan	Native Dancer
Sire Diesis 1980	Sharpen Up 1969	Atan	Mixed Marriage
Sire Diesis 1980	Sharpen Up 1969	Rocchetta	Rockefella
Sire Diesis 1980	Sharpen Up 1969	Rocchetta	Chambiges
Sire Diesis 1980	Doubly Sure 1971	Reliance	Tantieme
Sire Diesis 1980	Doubly Sure 1971	Reliance	Relance
Sire Diesis 1980	Doubly Sure 1971	Soft Angels	Crepello
Sire Diesis 1980	Doubly Sure 1971	Soft Angels	Sweet Angel
Dam Zarara 1997	Manila 1983	Lyphard	Northern Dancer
Dam Zarara 1997	Manila 1983	Lyphard	Goofed
Dam Zarara 1997	Manila 1983	Dona Ysidra	Le Fabuleux
Dam Zarara 1997	Manila 1983	Dona Ysidra	Matriarch
Dam Zarara 1997	Princess of Man 1975	Green God	Red God
Dam Zarara 1997	Princess of Man 1975	Green God	Thetis
Dam Zarara 1997	Princess of Man 1975	White Legs	Preciptic
Dam Zarara 1997	Princess of Man 1975	White Legs	Caspian Sea
