= Musidora (horse) =

Irish-bred Thoroughbred racehorse

- Sire: Nasrullah
- Grandsire: Nearco
- Dam: Painted Vale
- Damsire: Gainsborough
- Sex: Mare
- Foaled: 1946
- Country: Ireland
- Colour: Bay
- Breeder: F. F. Tuthill
- Owner: Norman Donaldson
- Trainer: Charles Elsey
- Record: 12: 4–?–?
- Earnings: £24,007

Major wins
- 1000 Guineas (1949); Epsom Oaks (1949)

Honours
- Musidora Stakes at York Racecourse

Musidora (1946 – c. 1968) was an Irish-bred British-trained Thoroughbred racehorse and broodmare, best known for winning two Classics in 1949. The filly won four times from twelve races in a racing career which lasted from 1948 until September 1949. After winning once as a two-year-old she won her first three races as a three-year-old including the 1000 Guineas over one mile at Newmarket and at The Oaks over one and a half miles at Epsom Downs Racecourse a month later. In the latter race she narrowly defeated the French filly Coronation, who went on to win the Prix de l'Arc de Triomphe. She finished unplaced in her three subsequent races and was retired to stud, where she had limited success as a broodmare.

== Background ==
Musidora was a bay mare with a small white star bred in Ireland by F. F. Tuthill, who had bought her dam, an unraced and unbroken mare named Painted Vale for 220 guineas. Painted Vale produced several winners apart from Musidora, the most successful being the colt Sovrango, who won the Chester Vase, the Ormonde Stakes and the Oxfordshire Stakes. Musidora came from the second crop of foals sired by Nasrullah, a talented but temperamental racehorse who became a highly successful breeding stallion, especially following his export to the United States in 1950. He was the British champion sire in 1951 and the North American champion on five occasions.

In 1947 the yearling filly was sent to the Doncaster sales where she was bought for 4,700 guineas by the Scottish shipping magnate Norman Donaldson. Donaldson sent Musidora into training with Charles Elsey at his Highfield stables at Malton in Yorkshire. She became the first of five classic winners trained by Elsey between 1949 and 1959.

== Racing career ==
In 1948, Musidora ran six times and won one race. She was placed second or third in the other five. In the Free Handicap, a rating of the year's best two-year-olds, Musidora was assigned a weight of 109 pounds, twenty-four pounds behind the top-rated Abernant and fourteen pounds behind the leading fillies Integrity and Ballisland.

Musidora began her three-year-old season at Stockton-on-Tees Racecourse in April when she won the Roseberry Stakes. She was then sent to Newmarket for the 1000 Guineas over the Rowley Mile course. Ridden by the Australian Jockey Edgar Britt, she started at odds of 100/8 in a field of eighteen runners. Unknown Quantity started favourite after being the subject of exceptionally strong support in the betting. Musidora gave trouble at the start, but once the race was under way she was soon among the leaders. Britt sent Musidora into the lead two furlongs from the finish and she won comfortably by one and a half lengths from Unknown Quantity with Solar Myth two lengths back in third.

In the Epsom Oaks a month later, Musidora was made 4/1 favourite against sixteen opponents, with Vice Versa on 5/1 and the French-trained Coronation on 6/1. Britt positioned Musidora just behind the leader Coronation for most of the race, and the race developed into a struggle between the two, with the King's filly Avila joining the pair in the straight. In a closely contested finish Musidora took the lead inside the final furlong and won by a neck from Coronation, with a gap of two lengths back to Vice Versa in third and Avila fading into fifth. The winning time of 2:40.0 was two seconds faster than that recorded by Nimbus in winning The Derby over the same course and distance two days later.

Musidora failed to reproduce her classic-winning form in her remaining races. She finished unplaced in the Yorkshire Oaks at York, the St Leger Stakes at Doncaster and the Doonside Cup at Ayr.

== Assessment and honours ==
In their book, A Century of Champions, based on the Timeform rating system, John Randall and Tony Morris rated Musidora an "average" winner of the 1000 Guineas and Oaks.

The Musidora Stakes, run every year at York since 1961 in late May or early June, was named in honour of the Yorkshire-trained mare.

== Stud record ==
As a broodmare, Musidora produced three winners, none of them top class. Her daughter Wishful Thinking, sired by Petition, produced Heavenly Thought, who won the Princess Royal Stakes in 1970. Heavenly Thought, in her turn, became a successful broodmare, producing the Queen Elizabeth II Stakes winner Homing as well as Water Mill, who finished second in the 1980 St Leger. Another daughter, Musical, produced Finlandia, the dam of the St Leger winner Snurge. On 5 December 1958, Musidora was sold in foal to Tudor Minstrel for 7,000 guineas ($20,580) to American turfman A.B. Hancock, but was not exported to the United States. She was exported to France in 1960 but was returned to the United Kingdom in 1962. She was reported as "dead" in the 1968 edition of the General Stud Book.

== Pedigree ==
Pedigree of Musidora (IRE), bay mare, 1946
Sire Nasrullah (GB) 1940	Nearco (ITY); 1935	Pharos	Phalaris
Sire Nasrullah (GB) 1940	Nearco (ITY); 1935	Pharos	Scapa Flow
Sire Nasrullah (GB) 1940	Nearco (ITY); 1935	Nogara	Havresac
Sire Nasrullah (GB) 1940	Nearco (ITY); 1935	Nogara	Catnip
Sire Nasrullah (GB) 1940	Mumtaz Begum (FR); 1932	Blenheim	Blandford
Sire Nasrullah (GB) 1940	Mumtaz Begum (FR); 1932	Blenheim	Malva
Sire Nasrullah (GB) 1940	Mumtaz Begum (FR); 1932	Mumtaz Mahal	The Tetrarch
Sire Nasrullah (GB) 1940	Mumtaz Begum (FR); 1932	Mumtaz Mahal	Lady Josephine
Dam Painted Vale (GB) 1936	Gainsborough (GB); 1915	Bayardo	Bay Ronald
Dam Painted Vale (GB) 1936	Gainsborough (GB); 1915	Bayardo	Galicia
Dam Painted Vale (GB) 1936	Gainsborough (GB); 1915	Rosedrop	St. Frusquin
Dam Painted Vale (GB) 1936	Gainsborough (GB); 1915	Rosedrop	Rosaline
Dam Painted Vale (GB) 1936	Abbot's Glen (GB); 1924	Abbots Trace	Tracery
Dam Painted Vale (GB) 1936	Abbot's Glen (GB); 1924	Abbots Trace	Abbots Anne
Dam Painted Vale (GB) 1936	Abbot's Glen (GB); 1924	Glentilt	Hurry On
Dam Painted Vale (GB) 1936	Abbot's Glen (GB); 1924	Glentilt	Flying Lem (Family 1-m)
