= Midnight Court (horse) =

Irish-bred Thoroughbred racehorse

- Racing silks of Mrs Olive Jackson
- Sire: Twilight Alley
- Dam: Strumpet
- Damsire: Umberto
- Sex: Gelding
- Foaled: 1971
- Country: Ireland
- Colour: Bay
- Breeder: Airlie Stud
- Owner: Mrs Olive Jackson
- Trainer: Fred Winter

Major wins
- SGB Handicap Chase 1977; Cheltenham Gold Cup 1978

Midnight Court was an Irish-bred racehorse who developed into a top class steeplechaser when trained in England by Fred Winter. He is best known for being the winner of the 1978 Cheltenham Gold Cup. He had the physical build of a chaser but was also a fluent mover. He was hit with leg trouble when at the height of his career.

== Background and early days in Ireland ==
Foaled in 1971, Midnight Court was sired by the 1963 Ascot Gold Cup winner Twilight Alley. Midnight Court's dam Strumpet, won a low grade maiden race on the flat. Midnight Court was bred at the Airlie Stud in Ireland. Reared as a store horse, he was sold to Toss Taaffe then went through the Tom Costello academy. He won two races over hurdles as well as winning a bumper race. He was then bought and transferred to England, where he went into training with Fred Winter at Uplands Stables, Lambourn.

== 1976/77 season ==
Midnight Court appeared on the racecourse six times, winning on three occasions. His first two outings came in handicap hurdles in November. He won both, firstly over two and a half miles at Chepstow, then over a furlong further at Newbury. Midnight Court was then switched to fences for his remaining four outings. After finishing third over three miles at Ascot, then being brought down on his next run, he opened his account over fences when winning the Beech Open Novices Chase over two and a half miles at Sandown Park in March. Ridden by his regular jockey John Francome, he delivered his challenge at the final fence and went to the front on the run-in to beat Arlonstown Boy by two lengths. On his final appearance, in the Heinz Novices Handicap Chase over two and a half miles at Ascot, Midnight Court carried 11st 11lb in to second place behind Commandant, leading for much of the race but tiring and being caught on the run-in.

== 1977/78 season ==
Midnight Court was unbeaten in seven starts which culminated with a victory in the Cheltenham Gold Cup. His first two starts were over two and a half miles, an Embassy Premier Chase qualifier at Newbury in October, then the Baxter Gate Chase at Doncaster where he won narrowly from Casamayor after receiving a bump from another runner in the home straight. Midnight Court's next two appearances, both prior to Christmas, were over three miles at Ascot. He won the Kirk And Kirk Handicap Chase by five lengths from Ghost Writer, to whom he was conceding 10 lb, then the SGB Chase by two lengths from Master Spy, carrying top weight of 12 st. In both contests Midnight Court had too much late pace for his rivals and won with Francome easing up. In what was intended to be his preparation race for Cheltenham, Midnight Court reverted to two and a half miles when lining up for the Morgan Grenfell Geoffrey Gilbey Memorial Handicap Chase at Newbury, where he carried two stone more than the runner up Young Arthur. Originally scheduled for its normal March date, the 1978 Cheltenham Gold Cup was postponed due to snow making the course unraceable. The rescheduled Gold Cup took place four weeks later. In the interim period Midnight Court had appeared in the Aynsley China Cup Chase at Chepstow, where he won without being stretched. Run on ground described as Good, ten runners lined up for the Cheltenham Gold Cup. Midnight Court started the 5/2 second favourite behind the Fulke Walwyn-trained Fort Devon. The field included the 1976 winner of the race, Royal Frolic, the recent Irish Grand National winner Brown Lad, and the King George VI Chase winner Bachelor's Hall. In the race, Francome sat Midnight Court prominently behind the leaders. Rounding the home turn, Midnight Court came up on the inside to join Fort Devon and Royal Frolic. Francome sent Midnight Court to the front and by the second last, the pair were pulling clear. They jumped the last ten lengths ahead of Royal Frolic, who took a heavy fall, and passed the post seven lengths clear of the staying-on Brown Lad, with Master H back in third. Midnight Court ended the season with a Timeform rating of 164, and received the organisation's ‘Best Staying Chaser’ award.

== 1978/1979 season ==
Midnight Court sustained an injury in his off fore leg and missed the whole of the season.

== 1979/1980 season ==
Midnight Court appeared twice without winning. He reappeared in the four-runner Peterborough Chase at Huntingdon in November, after a twenty-month absence from action. The Timeform representative at the track described him as looking “unusually soft in condition for a runner from the Winter stable”, and he finished third with the race being won by his stable companion Chumson. Midnight Court then reverted to hurdles in the Long Walk Hurdle at Ascot where he finished fifth, beaten a long way. It was discovered that he had sustained a tendon injury which put him out of action for the remainder of the season.

== 1980/1981 season ==
Midnight Court ran seven times, winning once. The victory came in his first run of the season, in the Tote Treble Hurdle at Cheltenham in January. After pulling up in another hurdle race on his next start he then switched back to fences, carrying top weight in the Jerry M Handicap Chase at Lingfield. He tired in the later stages to finish a respectable third. The Raceform representative at the meeting, John Sharratt, wrote, “To be realistic, this does not appear good enough for another successful tilt at the Gold Cup but one more run over fences could see him more of his old self.” Midnight Court appeared again less than two weeks later when he fell before halfway in a handicap chase at Newbury. Midnight Court then lined up for the 1981 running of the Cheltenham Gold Cup. Starting at 14/1, he made headway at halfway, but was beaten four fences from the finish and eventually came home last of the nine finishers, the race won by the Peter Easterby-trained Little Owl. Midnight Court appeared twice after the Gold Cup, falling on both occasions. On the final start, in the Three Fives Golden Miller Chase at Cheltenham he was disputing the lead when he came down at the second last. He ended the season with a Timeform rating of 155.

== 1981/1982 season ==
After being sent hunting, Midnight Court returned to Fred Winter and won three of his four starts, ridden by the stable's amateur rider Oliver Sherwood on each occasion. He reappeared in a Foxhunters race at Newbury in February where he beat inferior rivals comfortably. His next race was later in the month in the Pennine Chase at Doncaster. He faced two rivals, including the 1981 Cheltenham Gold Cup runner-up Night Nurse. Midnight Court ran a highly credible race to finish in second place, twelve lengths behind Night Nurse. A week prior to the Cheltenham Gold Cup he contested a Foxhunters race at Wincanton, winning without being troubled. The Raceform representative at the meeting wrote, “... he is not the horse he was and talk of the Gold Cup would seem to be wishful thinking.” Midnight Court missed the Gold Cup and instead ran in a Foxhunters race at Newcastle later in the week. Starting long odds on, he won easily. Midnight Court ended the season with a Timeform rating of 139, indicating that he was now far inferior to the horse he was at his peak.

== Later career ==
After leaving Fred Winter Midnight Court returned to his owner Mrs Olive Jackson. He ran in three Foxhunter races as a thirteen year old in the spring of 1984. On the second of those outings he won at Nottingham. His last appearance on a racecourse came at Ascot where he finished runner up to the former Triumph Hurdle winner Connaught Ranger.
