= Twilight Alley =

British-bred Thoroughbred racehorse

- Sire: Alycidon
- Grandsire: Donatello
- Dam: Crepuscule
- Damsire: Mieuxce
- Sex: Stallion
- Foaled: 1959
- Country: United Kingdom
- Colour: Chestnut
- Breeder: Victor Sassoon
- Owner: Lady Sassoon
- Trainer: Noel Murless
- Record: 4: 2-1-0

Major wins
- Ascot Gold Cup (1963)

Awards
- Timeform rating: 133

Twilight Alley (1959 – September 1976) was a British Thoroughbred racehorse and sire. A series of physical problems restricted him to four races a track career which lasted from July 1962 to July 1963. On his third racecourse appearance he defeated a strong field to win Britain's most important long-distance race, the Ascot Gold Cup. He broke down injured on his only subsequent appearance and was retired to stud where he had some success as a sire of steeplechasers.

== Background ==
Twilight Alley was a "giant" chestnut horse, standing over seventeen hands high with a narrow white blaze bred by the stud of Sir Victor Sassoon. He was sired by Alycidon an outstanding stayer who won the Ascot Gold Cup in 1949 before becoming a very successful breeding stallion. Alycidon was the Leading sire in Great Britain & Ireland in 1955. Twilight Alley's dam Crepuscule was an outstanding broodmare who had previously produced The Derby winner Crepello and the 1000 Guineas winner Honeylight. The colt was sent into training with Noel Murless at his Warren Place stable in Newmarket, Suffolk. Following the death of Victor Sassoon in 1961, Twilight Alley raced in the colours of his widow, Lady Sassoon.

== Racing career ==
Twilight Alley's huge size and fragile forelegs made him a very difficult horse to train and he did not race as a two-year-old. As a three-year-old he did not appear until July, when he won the Cranbourne Chase Maiden Stakes over one and a half miles at Ascot Racecourse. After the race he was found to have a heart murmur and did not race again for ten months.

In May 1963, Twilight Alley contested the inaugural running of the Henry II Stakes over two miles at Sandown Park Racecourse and finished second behind Gaul. On 20 June, at Royal Ascot, Twilight Alley was ridden by Lester Piggott in the Ascot Gold Cup. He started at odds of 100/30 in against six opponents including the French challengers Balto (winner of the Grand Prix de Paris in 1961 and the Gold Cup in 1962), Misti (third in the Prix de l'Arc de Triomphe) and Taine (winner of the Prix du Cadran in 1962 and 1963). Piggott sent the favourite into the lead after a quarter of a mile and opened up a clear advantage before easing the pace to allow the horse to have a "breather" six furlongs out. Twilight Alley accelerated again on the turn into the straight and held off the challenge of Misti to win by a length, with Taine in third and Balto in fourth. In July, Twilight Alley started 7/2 favourite for the thirteenth running of Britain's most prestigious weight-for-age race, the King George VI and Queen Elizabeth Stakes over one and a half miles at Ascot. Twilight Alley sustained a serious pastern injury during the race and finished unplaced behind Ragusa. He never raced again.

== Assessment ==
The independent Timeform organisation awarded Twilight Alley a rating of 133, five pounds below the top-rated Exbury. In their book, A Century of Champions, based on the Timeform rating system, John Randall and Tony Morris rated Twilight Alley as a "superior" winner of the Ascot Gold Cup.

== Stud record ==
Twilight Alley was retired from racing to become a breeding stallion at Lady Sassoon's Beech House stud in Newmarket. He made little impact as a sire of winners on the flat but had some success as a sire of National Hunt horses when based at Tyrley Castle Stud in Shropshire. The best of his progeny included Midnight Court, who won the Cheltenham Gold Cup in 1978 and Drumlargan who won the Sun Alliance Novices' Hurdle in 1980. Twilight Alley was euthanised in September 1976 due to pulmonary emphysema.

== Pedigree ==
Pedigree of Twilight Alley (GB), chestnut stallion, 1959
Sire Alycidon (GB) 1945	Donatello (FR); 1934	Blenheim	Blandford*
Sire Alycidon (GB) 1945	Donatello (FR); 1934	Blenheim	Malva
Sire Alycidon (GB) 1945	Donatello (FR); 1934	Delleana	Clarissimus
Sire Alycidon (GB) 1945	Donatello (FR); 1934	Delleana	Duccia di Buoninsegna
Sire Alycidon (GB) 1945	Aurora (GB); 1936	Hyperion	Gainsborough*
Sire Alycidon (GB) 1945	Aurora (GB); 1936	Hyperion	Selene
Sire Alycidon (GB) 1945	Aurora (GB); 1936	Rose Red	Swynford*
Sire Alycidon (GB) 1945	Aurora (GB); 1936	Rose Red	Marchetta
Dam Crepuscule (GB) 1948	Mieuxce (FR); 1933	Massine	Consols
Dam Crepuscule (GB) 1948	Mieuxce (FR); 1933	Massine	Mauri
Dam Crepuscule (GB) 1948	Mieuxce (FR); 1933	L'Olivete	Opott
Dam Crepuscule (GB) 1948	Mieuxce (FR); 1933	L'Olivete	Jonicole
Dam Crepuscule (GB) 1948	Red Sunset (GB); 1941	Solario	Gainsborough*
Dam Crepuscule (GB) 1948	Red Sunset (GB); 1941	Solario	Sun Worship
Dam Crepuscule (GB) 1948	Red Sunset (GB); 1941	Dulce	Asterus
Dam Crepuscule (GB) 1948	Red Sunset (GB); 1941	Dulce	Dorina (Family: 16-d)

* Twilight Alley is inbred 4S x 4D to the stallion Gainsborough, meaning that he appears fourth generation on the sire side of his pedigree, and fourth generation on the dam side of his pedigree.

* Twilight Alley is inbred 5S x 4D to the stallion Swynford, meaning that he appears fifth generation (via Blandford) on the sire side of his pedigree, and fourth generation on the dam side of his pedigree.
