= Edgar Britt =

Australian jockey

Edgar Britt OAM
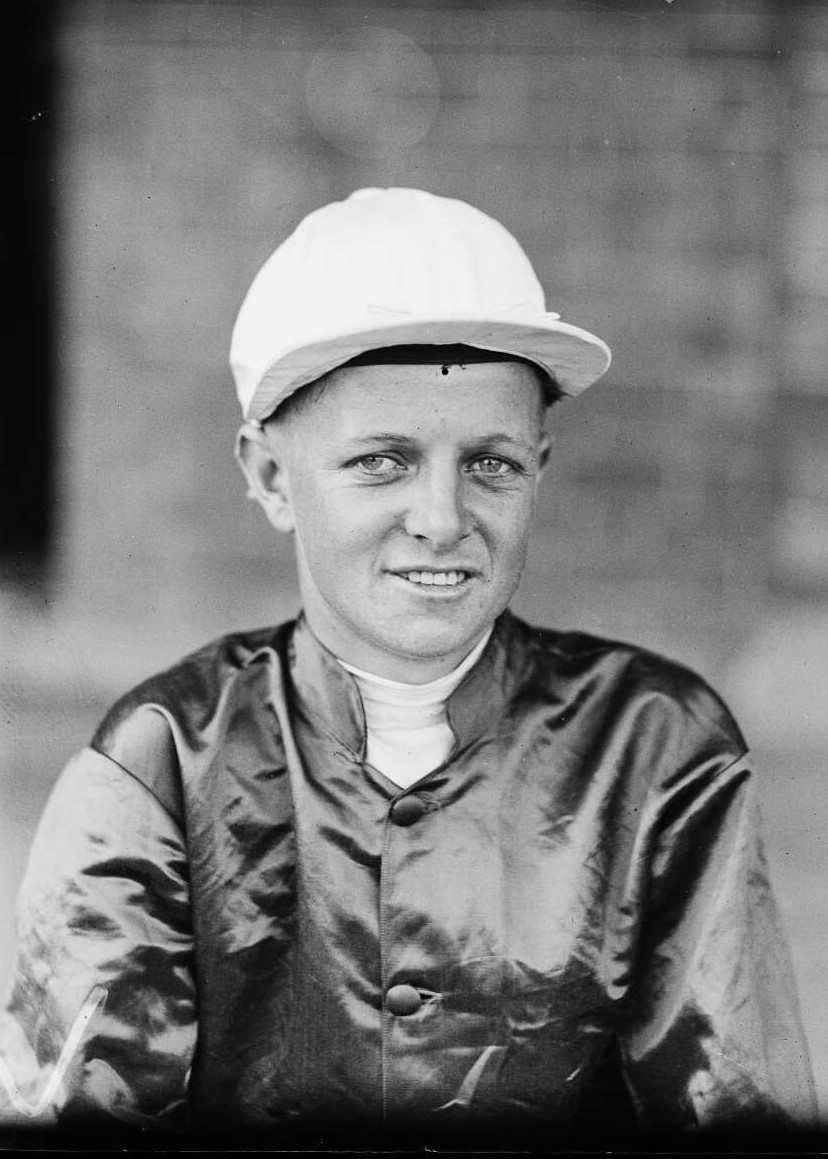
- Edgar Britt, 22 January 1934

Personal information
- Born: 30 October 1913 Balmain, New South Wales, Australia
- Died: 28 January 2017 (aged 103) Gold Coast, Queensland, Australia
- Occupations: Jockey, commentator, journalist

Horse racing career
- Sport: Horse racing

Major racing wins
- Classic race wins: 1000 Guineas Stakes (1949, 1956); 2000 Guineas Stakes (1953); Oaks Stakes (1949, 1952); St Leger Stakes (1947, 1948); Irish Derby (1947); Other major race wins: Champion Stakes (1953); Goodwood Cup (1957); Middle Park Stakes (1952); St. James's Palace Stakes (1948, 1953)

Honours
- Order of Australia

Significant horses
- Black Tarquin, Frieze, Honeylight, Musidora, Nearula, Sayajirao

Edgar Clive Britt OAM (30 October 1913 – 28 January 2017) was an Australian jockey, who won every British Classic Race except the Derby.

== Career ==
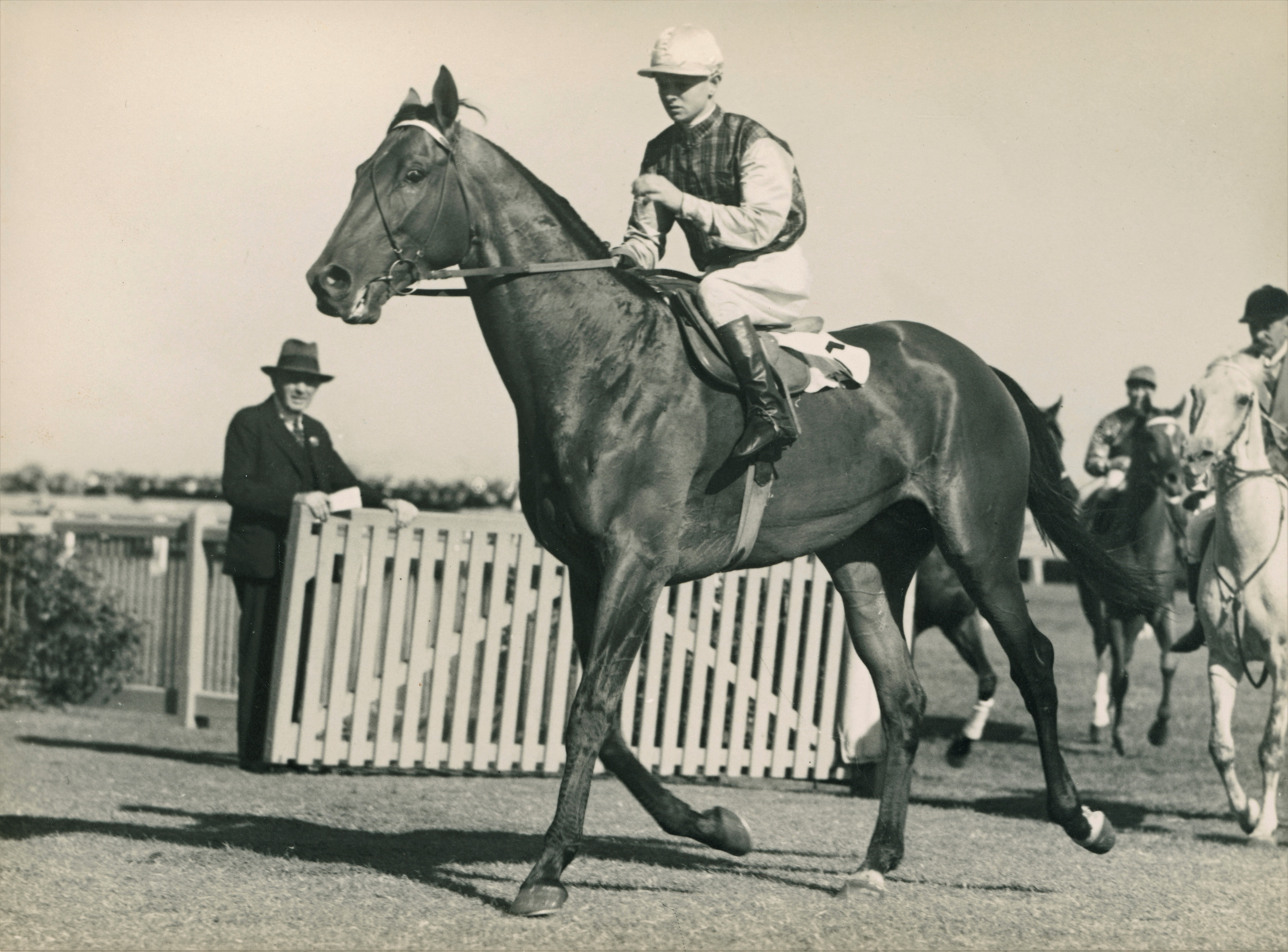
Britt riding Winooka at Caulfield Racecourse in 1933

One of the first of many Australian jockeys who came to ride in Britain after World War II, he rode his first winner at Canterbury, in Sydney in 1930, before riding for the Maharajah of Baroda in India for a decade from 1935. Britt moved to Britain to ride for the Maharajah, when his horses were trained by Sam Armstrong, winning the Cesarewitch Handicap on Kerry Piper and the substitute Manchester November Handicap on Oatflake in his first season in England. He rode Princess Beautiful to win India's first Derby held in 1943. The Maharajah's Sayajirao provided his first classic winner in 1947 in the Irish Derby and St. Leger. In 1948 Britt lost the retainer with the owner, but found a job with Marcus Marsh and when Harry Carr broke a leg, Britt came in for a number of rides for Cecil Boyd-Rochfort's yard, winning the St. Leger on Black Tarquin. He rode Musidora to win the 1949 1,000 Guineas and Epsom Oaks, Frieze (horse) in the 1952 Oaks, Nearula in the 1953 2,000 Guineas and Honeylight in the 1956 1,000 Guineas, all for Charles Elsey's stable. Britt retired in 1959 and returned to Australia.

== Honours ==
On 10 June 2004, aged 90, Britt was awarded the Medal of the Order of Australia for service to horse racing as a jockey, commentator and journalist. and was inducted into the Australian Racing Hall of Fame in the same year.

== Death ==
Britt died on 28 January 2017, aged 103.

== Major wins ==
(United Kingdom) Great Britain

- 1000 Guineas Stakes - (2) - Musidora (1949), Honeylight (1956)
- 2000 Guineas Stakes - Nearula (1953)
- Champion Stakes - Nearula (1953)
- Goodwood Cup - Tenterhooks (1957)
- Middle Park Stakes - Nearula (1952)
- Oaks Stakes - (2) - Musidora (1949), Frieze (1952)
- St. James's Palace Stakes - (2) - Black Tarquin (1948), Nearula (1953)
- St Leger Stakes - (2) - Sayajirao (1947), Black Tarquin (1948)

(Republic of Ireland) Ireland

- Irish Derby - Sayajirao (1947)
