= Mieuxce (horse) =

French-bred Thoroughbred racehorse

- Sire: Massine
- Grandsire: Consols
- Dam: L'Olivete
- Damsire: Opott
- Sex: Stallion
- Foaled: 1933
- Country: France
- Colour: Bay
- Breeder: Henri Ternynck
- Owner: Ernest Masurel
- Trainer: Elijah Cunnington
- Record: 9: 5-4-0

Major wins
- Prix Delatre (1936); Prix Hocquart (1936); Prix Lupin (1936); Prix du Jockey Club (1936); Grand Prix de Paris (1936)

Awards
- Leading broodmare sire in Great Britain and Ireland (1958)

Mieuxce (1933–1960) was a French Thoroughbred racehorse and sire. Bred by Henri Ternynck, owned by Ernest Masurel and trained by Elijah Cunnington he won five of his nine races, finished second in the other four, and was probably the best European colt of his generation. After finishing second in all three of his races as a two-year-old he won the Prix Delatre on his three-year-old debut but was beaten on his next appearance in the Prix Greffulhe. He then established himself as the best colt of the year in France with a sequence of four wins in seven weeks, taking the Prix Hocquart, Prix Lupin, Prix du Jockey Club and Grand Prix de Paris. His racing career was ended by a leg injury in the autumn of 1936. He was then exported to Britain where he became an influential breeding stallion.

== Background ==
Mieuxce was a "good-looking, but rather leggy" bay horse standing 16.2 hands high bred by Henri Ternynck at his Haras du But and named after the stud's location, Mieuxcé in Orne. During his racing career the colt was owned by Ernest Masurel and trained by Elijah Cunnington (Henri Ternynck's son-in-law) at Chantilly.

Mieuxce was sired by Massine, an outstanding French stayer who won twelve races including the Ascot Gold Cup and the Prix de l'Arc de Triomphe in 1924. In addition to Mieuxce, he sired Strip the Willow, who won the Prix du Jockey Club and Grand Prix de Paris in 1932. Mieuxce's dam L'Olivete was a high-class racemare who won the Prix de Royallieu in 1928, and a half-sister of the Prix de la Forêt winner Jocrisse.

== Racing career ==
=== 1935: two-year-old season ===
As a two-year-old, Mieuxce raced three times and finished second on each occasion. Two of his runs came in prestigious events in late autumn. He was beaten by Fastnet Prix Thomas Bryon over 1500 metres at Saint-Cloud Racecourse in November, having finished runner-up to the filly Amalia in the Prix de Condé over 2000 metres at Longchamp Racecourse in the previous month.

=== 1936: three-year-old season ===
In early April 1936, Mieuxce was a very impressive winner of the Prix Delatre over 2000 metres at Maisons-Laffitte Racecourse but in the Prix Greffulhe at Longchamp he was beaten by Fastnet after losing a great deal of ground at the start. On 10 May he was moved up in distance to contest the Prix Hocquart over 2400 metres at the same course and recorded his first major success as he won "without any difficulty" from the Prix de Fontainebleau winner Genetout. In the same month the colt won the Prix Lupin over 2100 metres, beating Grand Manitou and Patachon. In June, Mieuxce started at odds of 4.5/1 in a fourteen-runner for the 99th running of the Prix du Jockey Club over 2400 metres at Chantilly Racecourse. Ridden by Andre Rabbe, he won by one and a half lengths from Vatellor, with Genetout in third.

At the end of June the colt was moved up in distance for the Grand Prix de Paris over 3000 metres and started 2.5/1 favourite against nineteen opponents. The start of the race was somewhat delayed by a protest from a group of suffragettes who paraded in front of the stands before presenting a letter to the French President Albert François Lebrun. Mieuxce was not among the early leaders as Grand Manitou set a slow pace but moved up into third behind the Prix Eclipse winner Alcali and the British challenger Sind. In the closing stages Rabbe urged the favourite to quicken and Mieuxce accelerated past his rivals to win by one and a half lengths from Sind, with a further length and a half back to Alcali in third place. After the race Cunnington (who was of British descent) was interviewed in the paddock: with his bowler hat and tweed suit he was described as "a speaking likeness of what a Frenchman imagines John Bull to be".

Mieuxce was being prepared for a run in the Prix de l'Arc de Triomphe when he sustained an injury in training which ended his racing career. The injury involved a failure of the suspensory ligament in his left foreleg which led to a breakdown of the fetlock, but was also described as a split pastern.

== Stud record ==
At the end of his racing career Mieuxce was bought for 25,000 guineas by Victor Sassoon and brought to England to stand as a breeding stallion at the Woodditton Stud at an initial fee of 300 guineas. He was an immediate success, siring the Oaks Stakes winner Commotion. He did not fulfill his early promise but did get several other good winners including Paddy's Point (runner-up in 1958 Epsom Derby), Live Letters (Yorkshire Oaks), Ladycross (Yorkshire Oaks) and Mitrailleuse (Park Hill Stakes).

Mieuxce had a more enduring impact as a sire of broodmares being the damsire of Crepello, Combat, Honeylight, Twilight Alley, Major Portion (Sussex Stakes) and Marguerite Vernaut (Champion Stakes). He was Leading broodmare sire in Great Britain and Ireland in 1958 Mieuxce died in 1960 at the age of twenty-seven.

== Assessment ==
In their book A Century of Champions, based on a modified version of the Timeform system, John Randall and Tony Morris rated Mieuxce the one hundred and eight-fifth best racehorse of twentieth century, the thirty-ninth best horse of the century to have been trained in France, and the best horse foaled in 1933.

== Pedigree ==
Pedigree of Mieuxce (FR), bay stallion, 1933
Sire Massine (FR) 1920	Consols (FR); 1908	Doricles	Florizel II
Sire Massine (FR) 1920	Consols (FR); 1908	Doricles	Rosalie
Sire Massine (FR) 1920	Consols (FR); 1908	Console	Bend Or
Sire Massine (FR) 1920	Consols (FR); 1908	Console	Grace Conroy
Sire Massine (FR) 1920	Mauri (FR); 1909	Ajax	Flying Fox
Sire Massine (FR) 1920	Mauri (FR); 1909	Ajax	Amie
Sire Massine (FR) 1920	Mauri (FR); 1909	La Camargo	Childwick
Sire Massine (FR) 1920	Mauri (FR); 1909	La Camargo	Belle et Bonne
Dam L'Olivete (FR) 1925	Opott (FR); 1910	Maximum	Chalet
Dam L'Olivete (FR) 1925	Opott (FR); 1910	Maximum	Urgence
Dam L'Olivete (FR) 1925	Opott (FR); 1910	Oussouri	Chesterfield
Dam L'Olivete (FR) 1925	Opott (FR); 1910	Oussouri	Reve d'Or
Dam L'Olivete (FR) 1925	Jonicole (FR); 1920	Saint Just	St. Frusquin
Dam L'Olivete (FR) 1925	Jonicole (FR); 1920	Saint Just	Justitia
Dam L'Olivete (FR) 1925	Jonicole (FR); 1920	Sainte Fiole	Flacon
Dam L'Olivete (FR) 1925	Jonicole (FR); 1920	Sainte Fiole	Sainte Marie de Campan (Family:7-d)
