= Charles Elsey =

British racehorse trainer (1882–1966)

Personal information
- Born: 10 December 1882 Baumber, Lincolnshire, United Kingdom
- Died: 14 February 1966 (aged 83) Malton, Yorkshire
- Occupation: Horse trainer

Horse racing career
- Sport: Horse racing

Major racing wins
- British Classic Race wins: 2000 Guineas (1); 1000 Guineas (2); Epsom Oaks (2); St. Leger Stakes (1)

Racing awards
- British flat racing Champion Trainer (1956)

Significant horses
- Musidora, Frieze, Nearula, Honeylight, Cantelo.

Captain Charles Frederick Elsey CBE MC (10 December 1882 – 14 February 1966) was a British Thoroughbred racehorse trainer. The son and father of successful trainers, Elsey was one of the dominant racing figures in the North of England, for more than thirty years in a career which lasted from 1911 until 1960. He trained the winners of six classics and numerous major handicaps and was the Champion Trainer in 1956.

== Background ==
Charles Elsey was born in 1882 in Baumber, Lincolnshire, where his father, William Elsey ran a very successful racing stable. Elsey was a heavily built man, with brown eyes, dark eyebrows and an aquiline nose. He began training in 1911 at the Glasgow House Stable at Middleham, North Yorkshire, but abandoned his career in 1914 on the outbreak of the First World War. He served in the Yorkshire Hussars and the Royal Berkshire Regiment, attaining the rank of Captain and being awarded the Military Cross.

After the end of the war, he did not return immediately to racing, spending two years farming in Lincolnshire.

== Training career ==
Elsey resumed his training career in 1921 at Clyde House Stable at Ayr in Scotland. He sent out Westmead to win the Ayr Gold Cup in 1924 before moving his base to Highfield Stable in Malton, North Yorkshire in 1926. In the following three decades he established himself as one of the leading trainers in the North of England, achieving particular success in major handicap races, including the Wokingham Stakes, Ebor Handicap, Northumberland Plate, Cesarewitch, Chester Cup and Cambridgeshire Handicap.

After the Second World War, Elsey continued his success in handicaps, but began to also send out winners of major weight-for-age races. In 1949 he won both the 1000 Guineas and The Oaks with the filly Musidora. Three years later he won a second Oaks with Frieze and the Middle Park Stakes with the colt Nearula. In the following year Nearula won the 2000 Guineas, St James's Palace Stakes and Champion Stakes. At the end of the year the Highfield Stable was badly damaged in a fire. In 1954 he won the Chester Cup with his own horse Peperium a four-year-old who was chronically unsound and required the most gentle and careful training. Elsey won a fifth classic in 1956 when the filly Honeylight recorded an upset victory in the 1000 Guineas. Elsey won the title of British flat racing Champion Trainer for the first and only time at the end of the 1956 season at the age of seventy-four. In the following year, the Highfield three-year-old Tenterhooks emerged as one of the year's best stayers, winning the Queen's Vase, Ascot Stakes and Goodwood Cup. Elsey's last major winner was Cantelo, a filly who won the Royal Lodge Stakes in 1958 before taking the Cheshire Oaks and Ribblesdale Stakes in 1959 and winning a controversial race for the St Leger.

== Later life ==
Elsey suffered from arthritis in his later years and his mobility was restricted, leading him to depend on walking sticks from 1958. He retired from training in 1960 at the age of 78, leaving the Highfield Stable to his son Charles William Carlton "Bill" Elsey who had acted as his assistant trainer for several years. He continued to pursue an interest in field sports, and was an expert shot. Elsey's right leg was amputated in October 1965 and he died at Highfield on 14 February 1966.
