= Wilwyn =

British-bred Thoroughbred racehorse

- Sire: Pink Flower
- Grandsire: Oleander
- Dam: Saracen
- Damsire: Donatello
- Sex: Stallion
- Foaled: 1948
- Country: Great Britain
- Colour: Bay
- Breeder: Robert C. Boucher
- Owner: Robert C. Boucher
- Trainer: George Colling; John Waugh (assistant)
- Record: 35: 21-4-3
- Earnings: US$71,582 (equivalent)

Major wins
- Rous Memorial Stakes (1952); Great Yorkshire Stakes (1952); Washington, D.C. International Stakes (1952); Queen Anne's Plate (1953); John Porter Stakes (1953); Limekiln Stakes (1953)

Awards
- Leading sire in South Africa (1964)

Wilwyn (foaled 1948 in England) was a British Thoroughbred racehorse and sire.

== Background ==
Wilwyn was sired by Pink Flower, a son of one of Germany's great runners, Oleander, a three-time winner of the Grosser Preis von Baden and a two-time winner of the Grosser Preis von Berlin. His dam, Saracen, was a daughter of Federico Tesio's outstanding Italian runner, Donatello.

The horse was owned and bred by Robert C. Boucher, a fruit farmer from Kent , and trained by George Colling.

== Racing career ==
He raced at age three with his best conditions race result a third in the Knights Royal Stakes.

In October 1952, assistant trainer John Waugh brought the four-year-old Wilwyn to the United States where he won his eleventh straight race by capturing the inaugural running of the Washington, D.C. International Stakes at the Laurel Park Racecourse in Laurel, Maryland. An outstanding race in which the lead changed hands six times, the success of the Washington, D.C. International Stakes would help spawn the Breeders' Cup.

The November 27, 1952 edition of The New York Times reported that an American syndicate was negotiating with owner Robert Boucher to buy Wilwyn. The deal eventually did not go through as Boucher rejected an offer of US$100,000.

After winning the October 27, 1953 Limekiln Stakes at Newmarket Racecourse, Wilwyn was sent back to the United States for the second edition of the Washington, D.C. International Stakes. This time, he finished out of the money behind the winner Worden.

== Stud record ==
Wilwyn was retired to stud duty in England, but met with his greatest success as a sire after being sent to breeders in South Africa in 1959. There, he earned Leading sire honors in 1964. Wilwyn also has a successful progeny in Japan named Wildeal, who was named the Japanese Horse of the Year in 1959 after winning several graded races, most notably the Satsuki Shō.

== Sire line tree ==
- Wilwyn
  - Wildeal
    - Date Horai
    - Date Hakutaka
    - Date Tenryu
  - Kimberly Kid
  - King Willow
  - Before The Mast
  - Willet
  - Anchorage
  - Uncle Ben
  - Lightning Path
  - Perganum

== Pedigree ==
Pedigree of Wilwyn
Sire Pink Flower 1940 b.	Oleander; 1924 b.	Prunus	Dark Ronald
Sire Pink Flower 1940 b.	Oleander; 1924 b.	Prunus	Pomegranate
Sire Pink Flower 1940 b.	Oleander; 1924 b.	Orchidee	Galtee More
Sire Pink Flower 1940 b.	Oleander; 1924 b.	Orchidee	Orseis
Sire Pink Flower 1940 b.	Plymstock; 1918 dk. b.	Polymelus	Cyllene
Sire Pink Flower 1940 b.	Plymstock; 1918 dk. b.	Polymelus	Maid Marian
Sire Pink Flower 1940 b.	Plymstock; 1918 dk. b.	Winkipop	William the Third*
Sire Pink Flower 1940 b.	Plymstock; 1918 dk. b.	Winkipop	Conjure
Dam Saracen 1943 b.	Donatello; 1934 b.	Blenheim	Blandford
Dam Saracen 1943 b.	Donatello; 1934 b.	Blenheim	Malva
Dam Saracen 1943 b.	Donatello; 1934 b.	Delleana	Clarissimus
Dam Saracen 1943 b.	Donatello; 1934 b.	Delleana	Duccia di Buoninsegna
Dam Saracen 1943 b.	Lovely Rosa; 1933 b.	Tolgus	Stefan the Great
Dam Saracen 1943 b.	Lovely Rosa; 1933 b.	Tolgus	Rosa Croft
Dam Saracen 1943 b.	Lovely Rosa; 1933 b.	Napoule	Bachelor's Double
Dam Saracen 1943 b.	Lovely Rosa; 1933 b.	Napoule	Orange Girl*

* Wilwyn is inbred 4S x 5D to the stallion William the Third, meaning that he appears fourth generation on the sire side of his pedigree, and fifth generation (via Orange Girl) on the dam side of his pedigree.
