= Jack Jarvis =

British racehorse trainer

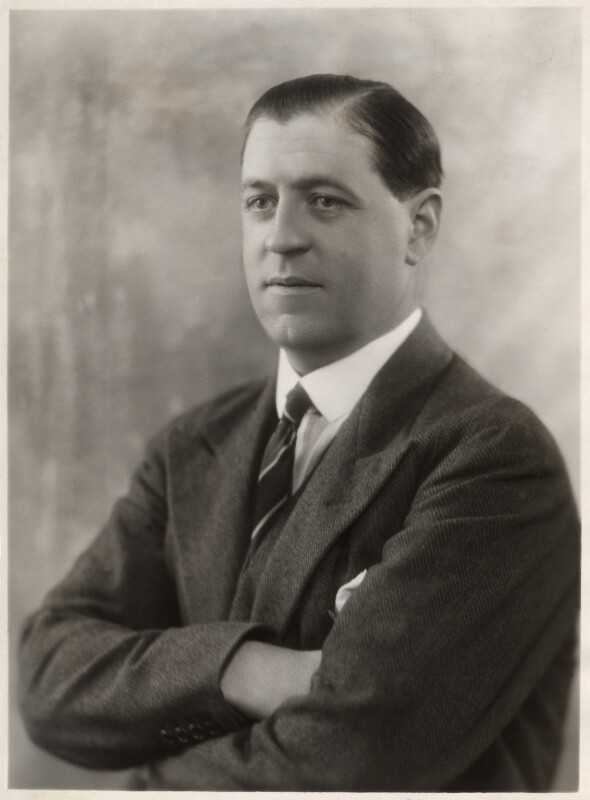
- Jarvis in 1928

Personal information
- Born: 27 December 1887 United Kingdom
- Died: 18 December 1968 (aged 80) Newmarket, Suffolk
- Occupations: Trainer, Jockey

Horse racing career
- Sport: Horse racing
- Career wins: circa 2000

Major racing wins
- British Classic Race wins as trainer: 2000 Guineas (3); 1000 Guineas (3); Epsom Derby (2); St Leger (1)

Racing awards
- British flat racing Champion Trainer (1939, 1951, 1953)

Significant horses
- Blue Peter, Ocean Swell, Royal Charger, Happy Laughter, Pretendre

Sir John Layton Jarvis (27 December 1887 – 20 June 1968) was a British trainer of racehorses. Born into a racing family, Jarvis had a brief but successful career as a jockey before taking up training. He was one of the most prominent British trainers of the mid 20th century, winning nine British Classic Races and being the British flat racing Champion Trainer on three occasions. In 1967 he became the first trainer to be knighted for services to horse racing.

== Background and riding career ==
Jack Jarvis was born in 1887, the third son of William Arthur Jarvis, who trained racehorses at Waterwitch House at Newmarket, Suffolk. William Jarvis trained several leading horses in the 1890s including Bona Vista and Cyllene. Two of Jack Jarvis' brothers trained Classic winners: William Rose "Willie" Jarvis (1885–1943) sent out the filly Godiva to win both the 1000 Guineas and Epsom Oaks in 1940, whilst Basil Jarvis (1887–1957) won The Derby with Papyrus.

Jack Jarvis became an apprentice jockey at his father's stable and rode his first winner in 1902 at the age of fourteen. In subsequent seasons he showed considerable promise, winning the Cambridgeshire Handicap on Hackler's Pride in 1902 and the Ayr Gold Cup in 1905 on Kilglass. Jarvis' rising weight made him unsuitable as a flat race jockey and after briefly competing under National Hunt rules he retired from riding in his early twenties. He then worked as his father's assistant trainer for five years.

== Training career ==
Jarvis set himself up at Warren House stable, Newmarket as a private trainer for A. E. Barton in 1914, but after two years the yard was closed because of the First World War. After serving with the Tank Corps Jarvis recommenced his training career in 1919 at Park Lodge, one of the oldest training stables in Newmarket. Jarvis won his first significant race in his second season when he trained Golden Orb to win the Wokingham Stakes at Royal Ascot, and confirmed his reputation by winning the Ascot Gold Cup and Eclipse Stakes with Golden Myth in 1922. Jarvis' success attracted the attention of Lord Rosebery and his son Lord Dalmeny who became the major patrons of the Park Lodge stable. At around the same time Jarvis employed Charlie Elliott as his stable jockey.

Throughout his career, Jarvis was known for the amount of hard exercise to which he subjected his horses. His methods were considered rather old-fashioned, but often gave his charges a fitness advantage in the early part of the season. Another feature of his training programme was that he often sent a strong team to campaign in Scotland in autumn: he trained over 100 winners at Ayr Racecourse, including three successive Ayr Gold Cups.

Jarvis' first classic success in 1923 when Elliott rode Rosebery's colt Ellangowan to victory in the 2000 Guineas and the same team combined to win the 1000 Guineas with Plack a year later. Jarvis had deliberately misled Rosebery about Ellangowan's condition in 1922: he wanted to give the colt time to develop and discouraged the owner from racing him by claiming that the horse had a recurrent coughing problem. Further classic success followed: in 1929 Elliott won the 2000 Guineas on Sir Laurence Philipps' Flamingo and two years later Sandwich won the St Leger after finishing an unlucky third in the Derby.

In 1938 Jarvis trained Blue Peter for Lord Dalmeny who had succeeded his father as Earl of Rosebery in 1929. The colt was beaten in both his races as a two-year-old, but he showed his best form in 1939, winning the 2000 Guineas and the Derby. He was denied the opportunity to win the Triple Crown when the outbreak of War forced the cancellation of the St Leger, but his earnings enabled Jarvis to win his first trainers' championship. During the war, Jarvis' best horses were the filly Ribbon who finished second in three classic races and the colt Ocean Swell who won the substitute Derby at Newmarket in 1944. Immediately after the war he trained Royal Charger, owned by his namesake Sir John Jarvis, who won the Ayr Gold Cup in 1946 before becoming a highly successful breeding stallion in the United States.

Jarvis opened a second yard at Palace House in Newmarket in 1950 and won a second championship a year later when he trained the winners of 62 races worth £56,397. There were no classic winners among them, with his best horses being the handicapper Fastnet Rock and the two-year-old filly Primavera, who won the Queen Mary Stakes at Royal Ascot. The trainer's final classic success came in 1953 when he trained Happy Laughter and Tessa Gillian to finish first and second in the 1000 Guineas. Happy Laughter later went on to win the Coronation Stakes and her earnings helped Jarvis win the trainers' title for a third time. In 1955 Jarvis threatened to retire after the Jockey Club attempted to introduce new rules making trainers liable for any delays caused by adjustments to a horse's girth strap before the start of a race. The rule was subsequently amended.

In 1965 Jarvis, by now 77 years old, scaled down his training commitments by giving up his Palace House stable. A year later he had two of the leading contenders for the Epsom Derby in General Gordon and Pretendre. General Gordon won the Chester Vase but was fatally injured in training shortly afterwards while Pretendre was beaten a neck by Charlottown at Epsom. Jarvis continued training until his death on 18 December 1968. At the time, Park Lodge stable housed a two-year-old filly named Sleeping Partner who went on to win the following year's Epsom Oaks, the only classic to have eluded Jarvis during his training career.

== Personal life and interests ==
Jarvis married Ethel Leader, the daughter of the trainer Thomas Leader, in 1914 and had one daughter. Away from racing he had a keen interest in cricket and coursing, and won the Waterloo Cup in 1926 with his greyhound Jovial Judge.

He was knighted by the Queen in the 1967 Queen's Birthday Honours List for services to horse racing, making him the first trainer to be so honoured. Jarvis wrote an autobiography entitled They're Off, which was published in 1969.
