= Rosebery Handicap =

Flat horse race in Britain

Rosebery Handicap
2026
Gamrai	Whitcombe Rockstar	Respond

Previous years
2025
Teumessias Fox	Ambiente Amigo	Real Dream
2024
Cemhaan	Killybegs Warrior	Intinso
2023
Max Mayhem	Hms President	Jewel In My Crown
2022
Belloccio	Stay Well	Hasty Sailor
2021
Al Zaraqaan	Almighwar	United Front

2020-2011
2019
Forbidden Planet	Pipes Of Peace	Desert Wind
2018
Crowned Eagle	Kelly's Dino	Contrast
2017
Big Country	Wild Hacked	Prince Of Arran
2016
Barsanti	Dutch Uncle	Castilo Del Diablo
2015
Noble Gift	Fire Fighting	Rebellious Guest
2014
Salutation	Grendisar	Rebellious Guest
2013
Buckland	Universal	Tepmokea
2012
Charles Camoin	Fork Handles	Ramona Chase
2011
Cosmic Sun	Red Cadeaux	Lunar Victory

2010-2003
2010
Dansili Dancer	King Olav	Mafeking
2009
Greylami	Sweet Lightning	Cape Express
2008
Philatelist	Mr Aviator	John Terry
2007
Luberon	Woolfall Blue	Weightless
2006
Kandidate	Rohaani	Young Mick
2005
Kew Green	St Andrews	Dunaskin
2004
Silence Is Golden	Dumaran	Counsel's Opinion
2003
Broadway Score	Goblet of Fire	Salute

The Rosebery Handicap is a flat handicap horse race in Great Britain open to horses aged four years or older. It is run at Kempton Park over a distance of 1 mile 2 furlong and 219 yards (2,212 metres), and it is scheduled to take place each year in late March or early April. It was switched to Kempton's newly opened all-weather track in 2006. The distance was increased from 10 furlongs to the current 11 furlongs in 2007.

The race was run on Easter Monday prior to 2003, changing to Easter Saturday until 2006. It is now usually run at a Saturday meeting held before or after Easter, on the same day as the Snowdrop Fillies' Stakes.

== Winners ==
Year	Winner	Age	Weight	Jockey	Trainer	Time
1931	Masher	4	8-06	Bernard Carslake	Ted Gwilt	2:12.20
1932	Huron	4	7-10	Billy Nevett	Jack Jarvis	2:06.60
1933	Galapas	5	7-06	Freddie Fox	Cecil Boyd-Rochfort	2:05.00
1934 (dh)	Diamantee; Leighon	5; 5	7–12; 8-10	Johnny Dines; Bobby Jones	George Digby; Joseph Lawson	2:04.20
1935	Penny Hill	4	6-11	Albert Richardson	Herbert Blagrave	2:09.40
1936	Theft	4	9-04	Charlie Smirke	Frank Butters	2:06.20
1937	William Of Valence	5	9-00	Herbert Packham	Herbert Smyth	2:15.60
1938	Nosegay	4	7-07	Peter Maher	Robert Colling	2:01.80
1939	Bacardi	5	8-00	Sir Gordon Richards	Fred Butters	2:11.60
1940-46	No Race
1947	Philadelphie II	5	8-02	Cliff Richards	George Todd	2:21.60
1948	Someo	5	8-03	Chuck Spares	Willie Stephenson	2:01.60
1949	Kinsale	5	7-07	Percy Evans	Gordon Johnson Houghton	2:07.40
1950	Roman Way	5	8-00	Eph Smith	Cecil Boyd-Rochfort	2:06.60
1951	Paradiso	4	8-04	Bill Rickaby	Jack Jarvis	2:22.20
1952	Star Twilight	5	7-04	Tommy Mahon	J C Waugh	2:10.40
1953	Fastnet Rock	6	8-11	Bill Rickaby	Jack Jarvis	2:08.80
1954	Wych Au Poor	4	8-02	Ken Gethin	Peter Thrale	2:05.00
1955	Durante	7	9-07	Doug Smith	Geoffrey Brooke	2:09.00
1956	Rhinehart	6	8-09	Harry Carr	Derrick Candy	2:04.20
1957	Royal Chief	4	7-00	Ray Reader	Herbert Blagrave	2:04.40
1958	Abandoned due to snow
1959	Red Letter	5	8-05	Scobie Breasley	William Smyth	2:10.60
1960	Falls Of Shin	7	8-09	Lester Piggott	Snowy Parker	2:11.20
1961	Proud Chieftain	4	9-03	Tommy Gosling	Dick Hern	2:02.80
1962	Damredub	5	7-09	Derek Morris	Towser Gosden	2:09.60
1963	Wilhelmina Henrietta	4	7-09	Derrick Greening	M J Bolton	2:10.40
1964	Red Tears	4	8-04	Joe Mercer	Dick Hern	2:09.00
1965	Noorose	4	7-07	Ray Reader	Snowy Parker	2:09.40
1966	Rehearsed	4	9-01	Ron Hutchinson	Gordon Smyth	2:16.40
1967	Hotroy	6	9-02	Duncan Keith	Walter Nightingall	2:06.40
1968	Midnight Marauder	6	8-09	Jimmy Lindley	Jeremy Tree	2:06.80
1969	First Pick	4	7-10	Jock Wilson	Harold Wallington Jnr	2:07.00
1970	Absolved	4	8-08	John Gorton	Bruce Hobbs	2:11.00
1971	Tudor Harmony	5	8-05	Joe Mercer	Derrick Candy	2:18.90
1972	Lord David	4	9-11	Lester Piggott	Staff Ingham	1:59.38
1973	Malleny	5	7-08	Tommy Carter	George Todd	2:05.03
1974	Red Brigand	5	7-12	John Matthias	Herbert Blagrave	2:07.40
1975	William Pitt	5	8-13	George Ramshaw	Staff Ingham	2:29.50
1976	Zimbalon	4	9-06	Joe Mercer	Dick Hern	2:05.60
1977	Air Trooper	4	7-10	Taffy Thomas	Bill Wightman	2:10.78
1978	Celtic Pleasure	4	8-06	Willie Carson	James Bethell	2:11.98
1979	Proven	4	8-09	Pat Eddery	Peter Walwyn	2:08.61
1980	Baronet	8	9-10	Brian Rouse	John Benstead	2:11.69
1981	Galveston	4	8-11	Greville Starkey	William Hastings-Bass	2:02.35
1982	Funny Spring	7	7-13	Willie Carson	Gavin Pritchard-Gordon	2:13.89
1983	Ridgefield	5	7-10	Philip Robinson	Dave Thom	2:24.37
1984	Bahoor	4	9-03	Guy Landau	Guy Harwood	2:00.97
1985	Rent Or Buy	4	7-13	Willie Carson	J Mulhern	2:24.94
1986	Nebris	5	8-10	Pat Eddery	Reg Akehurst	2:22.30
1987	Slangi Vah	4	8-03	Tyrone Williams	Henry Candy	2:08.92
1988	Fouz	5	8-11	Richard Quinn	Paul Cole	2:10.51
1989	Queens Tour	4	8-01	Alan Munro	Mel Brittain	2:12.47
1990	Starlet	4	8-00	Dale Gibson	Lord Huntingdon	2:02.98
1991	No Submission	5	7-06	Darryll Holland	Charlie Nelson	2:05.65
1992	Revif	4	8-10	Michael Roberts	Alec Stewart	2:06.99
1993	Lucky Guest	6	9-04	Lester Piggott	John Dunlop	2:16.68
1994	Swift Silver	7	7-01	Stuart Lanigan	Willie Musson	2:23.00
1995	Special Dawn	5	8-11	Pat Eddery	John Dunlop	2:05.29
1996	Hazard A Guess	6	8-11	Ray Cochrane	David Nicholls	2:08.97
1997	Romios	5	9-07	Richard Quinn	Paul Cole	2:04.32
1998	American Whisper	4	8-09	Carl Lowther	Peter Harris	2:20.80
1999	Carry The Flag	4	9-06	Jimmy Fortune	Paul Cole	2:03.97
2000 (Note: The race was run over 1 mile in 2000)	Pulau Tioman	4	9-08	Philip Robinson	Michael Jarvis	1:45.92
2001	Gentleman Venture	5	8-08	Paul Doe	John Akehurst	2:18.63
2002	Imperial Dancer	4	9-05	Dean Corby	Mick Channon	2:07.22
2003	Broadway Score	5	9-09	Richard Hills	John Hills	2:04.38
2004	Silence Is Golden	5	9-04	Frankie McDonald	Brian Meehan	2:10.38
2005	Kew Green	7	8-08	Dane O'Neill	Paul Webber	2:09.24
2006	Kandidate	4	9-10	Seb Sanders	Clive Brittain	2:05.73
2007	Luberon	4	9-09	Joe Fanning	Mark Johnston	2:20.94
2008	Philatelist	4	9-01	Neil Callan	Michael Jarvis	2:18.19
2009	Greylami	4	8-12	Chris Catlin	Terry Mills	2:20.75
2010	Dansili Dancer	8	9-10	John Fahy	Clive Cox	2:17.20
2011	Cosmic Sun	5	9-00	Jack Mitchell	Richard Fahey	2:17.17
2012	Charles Camoin	4	9-01	Liam Keniry	Sylvester Kirk	2:18.81
2013	Buckland	5	9-04	Nicole Nordblad	Hans Adielsson	2:18.65
2014	Salutation	4	8-10	Michael Murphy	Mark Johnston	2:16.09
2015	Noble Gift	5	9-02	Callum Shepherd	William Knight	2:23.38
2016	Barsanti	4	8-06	Jack Mitchell	Roger Varian	2:16.17
2017	Big Country	4	8-06	Silvestre de Sousa	Michael Appleby	2:18.27
2018	Crowned Eagle	4	9-01	Daniel Muscutt	Marco Botti	2:18.10
2019	Forbidden Planet	4	8-08	Jason Watson	Roger Charlton	2:15.65
	no race 2020 (Note: The 2020 running was cancelled because of the COVID-19 pandemic in the United Kingdom)
2021	Al Zaraqaan	4	9-10	Richard Kingscote	William Haggas	2:19.27
2022	Belloccio	4	9-3	David Egan	David Menuisier	2:21.27
2023	Max Mayhem	5	9-1	Benoit de la Sayette	Kevin Philippart De Foy	2:19.84
2024	Cemhaan	7	9-12	Neil Callan	George Baker	2:21.53
2025	Teumessias Fox	6	9-10	Oisin Murphy	Andrew Balding	2:17.69
2026	Gamrai	4	8-9	Rob Hornby	John & Thady Gosden	2:17.19

== See also ==
- Horse racing in Great Britain
- List of British flat horse races
