= Bunbury Cup =

Flat horse race in Britain

- Class: Handicap
- Location: July Course; Newmarket, England
- Race type: Flat / Thoroughbred
- Sponsor: Bet365
- Website: Newmarket

Race information
- Distance: 7f (1,408 metres)
- Surface: Turf
- Track: Straight
- Qualification: Three-years-old and up
- Weight: Handicap
- Purse: £60,000 (2020); 1st: £37,350

Bunbury Cup
2026
Aalto	Back In Black	Elarak

Previous years
2025
More Thunder	Aalto	Billyjoh
2024
Aalto	Lethal Levi	Summerghand
2023
Biggles	Ropey Guest	Awaal
2022
Bless Him	Ropey Guest	Jumby
2021
Motakhayyel	Fundamental	Lord Rapscallion

2020-2011
2020
Motakhayyel	Sir Busker	Godhead
2019
Vale Of Kent	Solar Gold	Admiralty
2018
Burnt Sugar	Spanish City	Shady Mccoy
2017
Above The Rest	Sir Dancealot	Steady Pace
2016
Golden Steps	Heaven's Guest	Mutawathea
2015
Rene Mathis	One Word More	Heaven's Guest
2014
Heaven's Guest	Absolutely So	Hoodna
2013
Field Of Dream	Es Que Love	I'm So Glad
2012
Bonnie Brae	Captain Bertie	Captain Ramius
2011
Brae Hill	Excellent Guest	Fathsta

2010-2001
2010
St Moritz	Palace Moon	Light From Mars
2009
Plum Pudding	Captain Brilliance	Mutheeb
2008
Little White Lie	Lovelace	Regal Parade
2007
Giganticus	King of Argos	Something
2006
Mine	Intrepid Jack	Marching Song
2005
Mine	Polar Magic	Pivotal Flame
2004
Material Witness	Court Masterpiece	Greenslades
2003
Patavellian	Mine	Tough Love
2002
Mine	Grizedale	Lord Protector
2001
Atavus	Hand Chime	Pays D'Amour

2000-1991
2000
Tayseer	Persiano	Nice One Clare
1999
Grangeville	Salty Jack	Teofilio
1998
Ho Leng	Kumait	Harmonic Way
1997
Tumbleweed Ridge	How Long	Elfland
1996
Crumpton Hill	Rabican	Mullitover
1995
Cadeaux Tryst	Sky Music	Anniversarypresent
1994
En Attendant	Set The Fashion	Tawafij
1993
En Attendant	Veloce	Dress Sense
1992
Consigliere	Ashdren	Knight Of Mercy
1991
Savoyard	Superoo	Gentle Hero

1990-1988
1990
Fedoria	Nayland	Bocas Rose
1989
Baldomero	Pinctada	Knight Of Mercy
1988
Pinctada	In Glory	Mac's Fighter

The Bunbury Cup is a flat handicap horse race in Great Britain open to horses aged three years or older. It is run on the July Course at Newmarket over a distance of 7 furlongs (1,408 metres), and it is scheduled to take place each year in July.

The event is named in honour of Sir Charles Bunbury (1740–1821), who served as the Senior Steward of the Jockey Club. He introduced both of the Classics held at Newmarket, the 1,000 Guineas and the 2,000 Guineas.

The Bunbury Cup is contested on the final day of Newmarket's three-day July Festival meeting.

== Records ==
Most successful horse (3 wins):

- Mine – 2002, 2005, 2006

Leading jockey (7 wins):

- Lester Piggott – Showoff (1966), Red Mask (1972), Pitskelly (1974), Paterno (1982), Mummy's Pleasure (1983), En Attendant (1993, 1994)

Leading trainer (3 wins):

- Michael Jarvis – Pitskelly (1974), Fedoria (1990), Savoyard (1991)
- James Bethell – Mine (2002, 2005, 2006)
- Richard Fahey - Brae Hill (2011), Heaven's Guest (2014), Rene Mathis (2015)

== Winners ==
- Weights given in stones and pounds.

Year	Winner	Age	Weight	Jockey	Trainer	SP	Time
1962	Blue Over	5	8-00	Geoff Lewis	Sam Armstrong	100/7	1:25.56
1963	Nereus	4	9-07	Scobie Breasley	Ken Cundell	15/8 F	1:24.63
1964	Passenger	5	9-09	Taffy Thomas	Pat Moore	100/7	1:27.57
1965	Grey Lord	3	7-11	Frankie Durr	Sir Gordon Richards	6/1	1:28.65
1966	Showoff	4	8-09	Lester Piggott	John Winter	9/1	1:25.18
1967	Vibrant	4	9-10	Peter Robinson	Teddy Lambton	3/1	1:29.69
1968	Swinging Minstrel	4	7-07	Ray Still	Bill Payne	8/1	1:31.02
1969	Woolley	4	6-09	Dennis McKay	Arthur Goodwill	9/1	1:27.58
1970	Golden Orange	4	7-02	Alan Cousins	Ken Cundell	5/1	1:28.72
1971	Grotto	4	7-07	Des Cullen	Bruce Hobbs	11/1	1:27.78
1972	Red Mask	5	8-12	Lester Piggott	Alec Kerr	100/30 F	1:29.50
1973	Fabvista	3	8-05	Greville Starkey	Henry Cecil	4/1	1:25.92
1974	Pitskelly	4	9-09	Lester Piggott	Michael Jarvis	6/1	1:26.06
1975	Penny Post	3	8-02	Pat Eddery	Bill Watts	7/1	1:26.90
1976	Lottogift	5	8-10	Richard Fox	David Hanley	11/2	1:26.62
1977	Kintore	5	8-00	John Lowe	Bill Watts	5/2 F	1:27.38
1978	Greenhill God	4	8-05	Paul Cook	Michael Stoute	9/2	1:27.72
1979	Pipedreamer	4	9-03	Philip Waldron	Henry Candy	15/2	1:24.03
1980	Steeple Bell	4	7-09	Ernie Johnson	Michael Stoute	8/1	1:26.03
1981	Captain Nick	5	9-13	Brian Taylor	Jeremy Hindley	11/1	1:25.67
1982	Paterno	4	9-01	Lester Piggott	Robert Armstrong	6/1	1:24.59
1983	Mummy's Pleasure	4	9-03	Lester Piggott	Patrick Haslam	9/1 CF	1:26.53
1984	Mummy's Pleasure	5	8-12	Tyrone Williams	Patrick Haslam	11/2	1:25.38
1985	Tremblant	4	8-12	Willie Carson	Ron Smyth	4/1 F	2:24.16
1986	Patriach	4	9-01	Richard Quinn	John Dunlop	6/1 F	1:25.50
1987	Individualist	4	8-05	Terry Lucas	William Hastings-Bass	16/1	1:23.72
1988	Pinctada	6	8-03	Gary Bardwell	Rod Simpson	6/1 CF	1:28.86
1989	Baldomero	4	7-07	Jimmy Quinn	William Jarvis	16/1	1:24.84
1990	Fedoria	4	8-03	Frankie Dettori	Michael Jarvis	8/1	1:24.19
1991	Savoyard	3	9-00	Walter Swinburn	Michael Jarvis	16/1	1:24.86
1992	Consigliere	4	9-01	Paul Eddery	Roger Charlton	10/1	1:26.02
1993	En Attendant	5	9-04	Lester Piggott	Ben Hanbury	14/1	1:25.07
1994	En Attendant	6	9-12	Lester Piggott	Ben Hanbury	14/1	1:24.93
1995	Cadeaux Tryst	3	9-01	Walter Swinburn	Ed Dunlop	20/1	1:26.96
1996	Crumpton Hill	4	8-12	Michael Roberts	Neil Graham	7/1	1:24.43
1997	Tumbleweed Ridge	4	9-06	Michael Tebbutt	Brian Meehan	20/1	1:24.86
1998	Ho Leng	3	9-07	Michael Kinane	Linda Perratt	14/1	1:22.59
1999	Grangeville	4	9-03	Kieren Fallon	Ian Balding	13/2 JF	1:23.16
2000	Tayseer	6	8-09	Gérald Mossé	David Nicholls	9/1	1:25.33
2001	Atavus	4	8-09	Jamie Mackay	George Margarson	10/1	1:23.67
2002	Mine (Note: Capricho dead-heated for first place in 2002, but he was disqualified for carrying an incorrect weight)	4	8-12	Kieren Fallon	James Bethell	5/1 F	1:26.43
2003	Patavellian	5	9-01	Steve Drowne	Roger Charlton	4/1 F	1:23.63
2004	Material Witness	7	9-03	Martin Dwyer	Willie Muir	25/1	1:26.20
2005	Mine	7	9-09	Richard Quinn	James Bethell	16/1	1:26.25
2006	Mine	8	9-10	Michael Kinane	James Bethell	10/1	1:24.26
2007	Giganticus	4	8-08	Philip Robinson	Barry Hills	16/1	1:24.54
2008	Little White Lie	4	9-00	Darryll Holland	John Jenkins	14/1	1:24.16
2009	Plum Pudding	6	9-10	Ryan Moore	Richard Hannon Sr.	12/1	1:23.39
2010	St Moritz	4	9-01	Frankie Dettori	Mark Johnston	4/1 F	1:23.75
2011	Brae Hill	5	9-01	Barry McHugh	Richard Fahey	11/1	1:23.91
2012	Bonnie Brae	5	9-09	Ryan Moore	David Elsworth	13/2	1:30.91
2013	Field of Dream	6	9-07	Adam Kirby	Jamie Osborne	14/1	1:23.09
2014	Heaven's Guest	4	9-03	Tony Hamilton	Richard Fahey	12/1	1:25.61
2015	Rene Mathis	5	9-01	Paul Hanagan	Richard Fahey	16/1	1:22.61
2016	Golden Steps	5	9-00	Frankie Dettori	Marco Botti	7/1 JF	1:23.99
2017	Above The Rest	6	8-10	Clifford Lee	David Barron	12/1	1:23.78
2018	Burnt Sugar	6	9-01	Paul Hanagan	Roger Fell	7/1	1:24.36
2019	Vale of Kent	4	9-01	Frankie Dettori	Mark Johnston	13/2	1:22.69
2020	Motakhayyel	4	9-07	Jim Crowley	Richard Hannon Jr.	5/1	1:23.12
2021	Motakhayyel	5	9-10	Frankie Dettori	Richard Hannon Jr.	11/2	1:24.03
2022	Bless Him	8	9-03	Jamie Spencer	David Simcock	25/1	1:22.84
2023	Biggles	6	9-03	Ryan Moore	Ralph Beckett	5/1	1:25.70
2024	Aalto	4	8-12	Rossa Ryan	Ian Williams	15/2	1:24.08
2025	More Thunder	4	9-08	Tom Marquand	William Haggas	6/5F	1:24.75
2026	Aalto	6	8-10	William Buick	Ian Williams	4/1F	1:24.00

== See also ==
- Horse racing in Great Britain
- List of British flat horse races
