= Carl Lowther =

English jockey

Personal information
- Born: 28 January 1974 (age 52)
- Occupation: Jockey

Horse racing career
- Sport: Horse racing

Major racing wins
- Major British races: King's Stand Stakes (1998)

Significant horses
- Bolshoi
- Updated on 26 October 2023

Carl Lowther (28 January 1974) is a former Group 1-winning jockey who was British flat racing Champion Apprentice in 1998.

== Career ==
Carl Lowther was born on 28 January 1974, the son of motor mechanic Graham and hairdresser Ann-Marie. After leaving school at 16, he joined Jack Berry's yard as a stable lad. He took part in the stable lads' boxing championships one year, and when Berry asked him to go in for it again, Lowther said only if Berry got him a jockeys' licence. Competition among the yard's apprentices was fierce and Lowther had to wait his turn, admitting he was "a bit weak" in the early days.

His first win came in 1995, one of 35 rides he had that year, though he had to wait another sixteen months for his next victory. He had his first big win in 1997, when he won Redcar's Zetland Gold Cup on Champagne Prince, also taking big Epsom and Newmarket handicaps on the Peter Harris-trained horse.

In 1998, he rode 72 winners, for over £500,000 in prize money, to become Champion Apprentice. Among his wins were two at Royal Ascot – the Wokingham Stakes on Selhurstpark Flyer and the Group 1 King's Stand Stakes on Bolshoi, a horse he had also taken the Group 2 Temple Stakes on. He also won the Rosebery Stakes on American Whisper. Other big handicaps he took in his career include the 1999 Old Newton Cup on Celestial Welcome and 2001 Carlisle Bell on Kestral. That was the last year he reached double figures of winners. Over the next three years, his total dropped to 6, 2 and 3 (from only 35 rides).

In July 2000, he became the first jockey to test positive for alcohol testing from urine samples since they began in 1994, but was exonerated when it was found that the testing official had allowed him to go to the bar for a drink of shandy to speed up delivery of his sample. He also ran in to trouble with the authorities off the track. In 2004, he faced magistrates accused of biting his partner after an all-day drinking session.

== Major wins ==
(United Kingdom) Great Britain

- King's Stand Stakes – Bolshoi (1998)

== See also ==
- List of jockeys
