= Carlisle Bell =

Flat horse race in Britain

- Class: Handicap
- Location: Carlisle Racecourse; Carlisle, England
- Inaugurated: 1599
- Race type: Flat / Thoroughbred
- Website: Carlisle

Race information
- Distance: 7f 173y (1,566 metres)
- Surface: Turf
- Qualification: Three-years-old and up
- Weight: Handicap
- Purse: £31,000 (2022); 1st: £16,416

Carlisle Bell
2018
Waarif	Raselasad	Presidential

Previous years
2017
Carnageo	King's Pavilion	Georgian Bay
2016
Edgar Balthazar	Alejandro	Alexandrakollontai
2015
Ifwecan	Provident Spirit	Our Boy Jack
2014
Johnno	Sound Advice	Balducci
2013
Silvery Moon	Chookie Royale	Pacific Heights
2012
Levitate	Toto Skyllachy	Silvery Moon
2011
Miami Gator	Vito Volterra	Take It To The Max
2010
Camerooney	Major Phil	Smarty Socks
2009
Stevie Gee	Motafarred	Bold Marc
2008
Osteopathic Remedy	Bold Marc	Rainbow Mirage
2007
Bold Marc	Prince Evelith	Daaweitza
2006
Regent's Secret	Riley Boys	Hula Ballew
2005
Hartshead	Goodbye Mr Bond	African Sahara
2004
Goodbye Mr Bond	Countykat	Tedstale
2003
Top Dirham	Definite Guest	Investment Affair

The Carlisle Bell is a historic British flat horse race, first contested in 1599 and still run today. The race's name relates to the bells which were awarded to the winners of the race in the reign of Elizabeth I. These bells are reputed to be the oldest horse racing prizes in Britain and are now held at the Carlisle Guildhall Museum.

It is run at Carlisle Racecourse over a distance of 7 furlongs and 173 yards (1,566 metres) and it is scheduled to take place each year in June alongside another historic race the Cumberland Plate.

== The bells ==
There are two bells. The larger one, 2 1/2 inches in diameter, was donated by Lady Dacre in 1559 and bears the inscription:

The sweftes horse thes bel to tak for mi lade Daker sake
(The swiftest horse this bell to take for my lady Dacre's sake)

The second, smaller bell is inscribed 1599 H.B.M.C which is believed to stand for "Henry Baines, Mayor of Carlisle".

Civic records from the 17th century list the bells among four racing prizes competed for at Carlisle.

"We request that Mr Mayor and his bretheren shall call for the silver broad arrows and the stock and the horse and nage bells with all expedition to be employed for maintaining of a horse race for the city's use (upon the king's moor) at such time yearly as they shall think convenient and to article"

— Carlisle civic records, 1619

The bells were thought to have been lost for many years, but were rediscovered in a box in the town clerk's office in the late 19th century.

== Winners since 1922 ==
Year	Winner	Age	Weight	Jockey	Trainer	Time
1922	Bold Knight	3	7-03	J T Brown	Bazley
1923	Emulsion	3	7-12	Peter Jones	Tom Waugh
1924	Dropitin	3	6-10	Harding	Hewitt Henry Golightly
1925	In Earnest	3	8-08	George Hulme	Robert Colling
1926 (dh)	Eaglesholt; River Watcher	3; 3	8-08; 7-12	Joseph Taylor; D Morris	William Ridley; Robert Colling
1927	Deltos	3	8-13	L Brown	Ossie Bell
1928	Physic Ball	3	9-00	George Baines	Major Vanda Beatty
1929	Knight's Service	3	8-06	Cecil Ray	Sam Armstrong
1930	Pomarrel	3	8-01	Billy Nevett	Matthew Peacock
1931	Silver Glade	3	7-10	Billy Nevett	Matthew Peacock
1932	Silver Glade	4	8-04	Billy Nevett	Matthew Peacock
1933	Debonair	5	8-11	Rufus Beasley	Sam Armstrong
1934	Tamarix	4	7-12	Willie Christie	Gerald Armstrong
1935	Miss Richardson	3	7-02	Johnny Dines	Matthew Peacock
1936	Wardley	5	7-01	Willie Christie	John Harper
1937	Dunrel	8	7-07	Percy Evans	Harry Peacock	1:41.20
1938	Master Bimbo	3	7-07	Willie Christie	Noel Murless	1:42.20
1939	Arch Glance	4	7-09	Georgie Wells	Gerald Armstrong	1:43.20
1940-45	No Race
1946	Clever Lad	5	7-02	Willie Christie	Edward Robson	1:41.60
1947	Brink	4	7-10	Peter Maher	William Carr	1:46.60
1948	Clever Lad	7	8-04	Joe Sime	A Cooper	1:42.40
1949	Laird Of Moray	4	7-04	Joe Sime	George Boyd	1:40.80
1950	Pharos Light	4	8-02	Billy Nevett	Matthew Peacock	1:41.60
1951	Companion-Way	5	7-04	Herbert Jones	J Pearce	1:40.60
1952	Claverhouse	7	8-03	Herbert Jones	J Pearce	1:43.80
1953	Likabula	4	7-04	Cliff Parkes	Tommy Dent	1:41.00
1954	Orgoglio	5	9-07	Edgar Britt	Charles Elsey	1:44.40
1955	Sari	4	7-02	Roy Arnold	Richard Perryman	1:44.00
1956	Gay Tor	4	8-06	Tony Rawlinson	Richard Perryman	1:40.80
1957	Norcrest	6	7-11	Eddie Larkin	A Cooper	1:40.20
1958	Heckley	7	8-01	Brendan Mooney	Jack Ormston	1:44.80
1959	Monawin	4	7-11	Edgar Britt	Jack Ormston	1:44.40
1960	Princess Antiope	4	8-04	Geoff Littlewood	Harry Peacock	1:40.00
1961	Royal Jester	5	8-03	Norman Stirk	George Boyd	1:39.60
1962	Alba Rock	4	8-13	Johnny Greenaway	Jack Calvert	1:41.80
1963	Mighty Gurkha	4	9-07	Joe Sime	Ted Lambton	1:44.00
1964	Karelia	3	8-05	Donald Morris	Bill Elsey	1:40.60
1965	Aberdeen	4	9-08	Peter Robinson	Humphrey Cottrill	1:39.00
1966	Aberdeen	5	9-04	Bruce Raymond	Humphrey Cottrill	1:41.60
1967	Replacement	4	7-05	Walter Bentley	Harry Peacock	1:39.60
1968	Red Swan	5	8-10	Kipper Lynch	Tommy Robson	1:42.00
1969	Fragrant Rose (Note: In 1969 Dumpty finished first, but was disqualified for interference and placed second.)	4	7-11	Ernie Johnson	Sam Hall	1:41.00
1970	Ardent Plea	6	7-00	Norman McIntosh	William Carr	1:43.60
1971	El Credo	5	7-10	Tony Ives	Denys Smith	1:40.60
1972	Golden Passenger	4	8-07	John Gorton	Richmond Sturdy	1:49.00
1973	Fair Camilla	5	8-03	Robert Edmondson	Paul Cole	1:40.90
1974	Fiery Coin	4	8-00	Eddie Hide	D Williams	1:39.30
1975	Confluence	4	8-05	Ernie Johnson	Bill Haigh	1:40.50
1976	Prince Of Light	4	9-07	Sandy Barclay	Denys Smith	1:39.40
1977	Prince Of Light	5	8-00	Paul Tulk	Denys Smith	1:39.70
1978	Pam's Gleam	5	7-04	Kevin Darley	Reg Hollinshead	1:40.60
1979	Fairy Fisherman	5	9-05	Jimmy Bleasdale	J D Bingham	1:39.20
1980	Kithairon	9	8-03	Alan Mercer	Bill Watts	1:42.70
1981	Reside	5	9-06	Chris Dwyer	E Carter	1:39.60
1982	Silleys Knight	6	9-04	Ernie Johnson	Jack Hanson	1:39.00
1983	Vain Deb	4	7-07	Dennis McKay	Patrick Haslam	1:45.60
1984	Scoutsmistake	5	8-10	Ray Cochrane	Bryan McMahon	1:40.10
1985	The Howard	3	8-06	Nigel Day	Mrs C J Reavey	1:39.70
1986	Samhaan	4	7-09	A Geran	Ben Hanbury	1:57.00
1987	Handlebar	5	9-13	Nick Connorton	Bill Watts	1:43.00
1988	Affaire De Coeur	4	7-03	Steve Wood	Patrick Haslam	1:40.40
1989	Overpower	5	8-08	Alan Mercer	Bill Watts	1:38.40
1990	Causley	5	9-05	Bruce Raymond	Bryan McMahon	1:40.10
1991	Miss Sarajane	7	8-02	Gary Hind	Reg Hollinshead	1:40.70
1992	Spanish Verdict	5	9-08	Darryll Holland	Denys Smith	1:38.20
1993	Queen Warrior	4	7-11	D Wright	Peter Walwyn	1:39.50
1994	Master Of the House	8	7-13	J Marshall	Mickey Hammond	1:39.80
1995	Master Of the House	9	8-06	J Marshall	Mickey Hammond	1:38.20
1996	Habeta	10	8-02	George Duffield	Bill Watts	1:37.40
1997	Rainbow Rain	3	9-01	Michael Roberts	Mark Johnston	1:39.00
1998	Lucky Archer	5	8-12	Kevin Darley	Milton Bradley	1:43.30
1999	Pas de Memoires	4	9-12	Dean McKeown	Karl Burke	1:39.10
2000	Kirovski	3	8-08	John Egan	Peter Harris	1:38.80
2001 (Note: The 2001 Carlisle Bell was run at Thirsk)	Kestral	5	8-12	Carl Lowther	Tim Etherington	1:38.30
2002	Travelling Band	4	9-09	Liam Keniry	Ian Balding	1:39.80
2003	Top Dirham	5	9-07	Dale Gibson	Mick Easterby	1:38.63
2004	Goodbye Mr Bond	4	9-01	Franny Norton	Eric Alston	1:40.53
2005	Hartshead	6	9-09	Fergal Lynch	Alan Swinbank	1:37.69
2006	Regent's Secret	6	9-03	Fergal Lynch	Jim Goldie	1:39.06
2007	Bold Marc	5	9-07	Andrew Elliott	Karl Burke	1:39.19
2008	Osteopathic Remedy	4	9-04	Tom Eaves	Michael Dods	1:43.48
2009	Stevie Gee	5	9-08	Joe Fanning	Alan Swinbank	1:39.77
2010	Camerooney	7	9-02	Dale Swift	Brian Ellison	1:39.58
2011	Miami Gator	4	9-00	Andrew Elliott	Karl Burke	1:41.00
2012	Levitate	4	9-10	William Twiston-Davies	Alan McCabe	1:44.77
2013	Silvery Moon	6	9-07	Robert Winston	Tim Easterby	1:38.48
2014	Johnno	5	9-03	Adrian Nicholls	David Nicholls	1:38.69
2015	Ifwecan	4	9-06	Joe Fanning	Mark Johnston	1:39.11
2016	Edgar Balthazar	4	9-05	Philip Makin	Keith Dalgleish	1:37.02
2017	Carnageo	4	9-02	Paul Hanagan	Richard Fahey	1:43.09
2018	Waarif	5	8-12	Conor McGovern	David O'Meara	1:35.84
2019	Rousayan	8	9-07	David Egan	Roger Fell	1:38.17
	no race 2020 (Note: The 2020 running was cancelled because of the COVID-19 pandemic in the United Kingdom)
2021	Chichester	4	9-09	Joe Fanning	Keith Dalgleish	1:37.25
2022	Invincibly	4	9-07	Clifford Lee	Karl Burke	1:38.04
2023	Mostawaa	7	9-08	Hollie Doyle	Heather Main	1:41.79
2024	Orbaan	9	9-12	Daniel Tudhope	David O'Meara	1:36.70
2025	On The River	6	9-04	Joe Fanning	Harriet Bethell	1:42.19
2026	Priapos	4	9-12	Sam James	Phillip Makin	1:37:14

== See also ==
- Horse racing in Great Britain
- List of British flat horse races

== Bibliography ==
- Mortimer, Roger; Onslow, Richard; Willett, Peter (1978). Biographical Encyclopaedia of British Racing. London: Macdonald and Jane's. ISBN 0-354-08536-0.
- Strutt, Joseph (1801). The Sports and Pastimes of the People of England from the Earliest Period. Methuen.
