= Jason Hart (jockey) =

Scottish jockey

Personal information
- Born: Hawick, Scotland
- Occupation: Jockey

Horse racing career
- Sport: Horse racing

Major racing wins
- Major British races: Flying Five Stakes (2022); Nunthorpe Stakes (2022); Major French races: Prix Maurice de Gheest (2022); Prix de l'Abbaye de Longchamp (2023)

Significant horses
- Highfield Princess
- Updated on 22 October 2023

Jason Hart is a Group 1-winning jockey, whose biggest successes to date have come with the multiple Group race winning sprinter Highfield Princess. He was Champion Apprentice in 2013 and rode his first Royal Ascot winner in 2021.

== Career ==
=== Apprentice ===
Hart was born in Hawick in the Scottish Borders. His grandfather, Derek Campbell, had been a jump jockey. He started his career competing in pony racing, before moving south at age 15 to join Mark Johnston's stable after e-mailing them asking if he could ride out for them. Hart referred to the stable as a "great place to learn". As a youngster, he played a lot of rugby, getting to the equivalent of county level, but he opted to stay in Scotland to go pony racing instead of going on tour to Wales with his club Hawick Albion.

Johnston gave him his first ride on Elusive Fame at Southwell in February 2011. He finished second, beaten a quarter of a length. He then transferred to a different trainer, Declan Carroll, who provided his first victory on Spice Bar, a former hurdler, at Ripon in August 2011. A few days later, he got his first Scottish winner, Catallout at Musselburgh. Other trainers who regularly used him at this time were Tim Walford, Eric Alston and Keith Dalgleish. In 2012, he spent a winter work riding at Santa Anita in California.

In 2013, he passed 50 winners for the first time to become Champion Apprentice, six years after Greg Fairley, another jockey from the Scottish border town of Hawick. He also won the seven-race Apprentice Training Series at Haydock Park.

In his apprentice days, his role model was Johnston's stable jockey, Joe Fanning.

=== Professional ===
His first big race victory came on 7 May 2016 when he won the Listed Kilvington Fillies' Stakes on Ridge Ranger, following up on the same horse two months later in the Group 3 Summer Stakes. Over the next few years, his best horses were El Astronaute (2018 Prix de Bonneval, 2019 Midsummer Sprint Stakes and Rockingham Handicap and 2020 Achilles Stakes), Safe Voyage (2019 Spring Trophy and John of Gaunt Stakes, 2020 City of York Stakes and Surrey Stakes and 2021 City Plate Stakes) and Liberty Beach (2019 Dragon Stakes and Molecomb Stakes, 2020 Cecil Frail Fillies' Stakes and 2021 Temple Stakes). Johnston's Royal Patronage gave him two group victories in just over a month in late summer 2021 - the Acomb Stakes on 18 August and the Royal Lodge Stakes on 25 September, and provided Hart with his first Classic ride in the following years 2,000 Guineas, finishing 8th. In 2021, he passed 100 winners - a target he and his agent had set at the start of the year - and £1million in prize money for the first time and ended with his highest total to date - 105.

In 2020, he established a hugely successful partnership with the John Quinn-trained filly Highfield Princess, riding her to victory in four minor races. She took a major step forward the next year, giving Hart his first Royal Ascot winner in the Buckingham Palace Handicap, then taking the Queen Charlotte Fillies' Stakes. Then, in 2022, after taking the All-Weather Fillies And Mares' Championship, she won her first group race on 11 May, the Clipper Logistics Stakes. In August, she went to France and took the Group 1 Prix Maurice de Gheest, returning to England to take the Nunthorpe Stakes less than two weeks later, and then the Flying Five Stakes on 11 September. In the autumn, she ventured to America and came fourth in the Breeders' Cup Turf Sprint. 2023 brought more group success in the King George Stakes and Prix de l'Abbaye de Longchamp. The latter came in the same week as his first child was born. As a result, in 2023, Hart surpassed £2million in prize money for the first time and finished 10th in the Jockeys' Championship.

== Personal life ==
He married Jess McLernon, sister of Richie in November 2021 and they have one child together. He continues to have an interest in rugby, as he played as a youngster, and enjoys watching Scotland at Murrayfield.

== Major wins ==
(United Kingdom) Great Britain

- Nunthorpe Stakes - Highfield Princess (2022)

(Republic of Ireland) Ireland

- Flying Five Stakes - Highfield Princess (2022)

France

- Prix Maurice de Gheest - Highfield Princess (2022)
- Prix de l'Abbaye de Longchamp - Highfield Princess (2023)

== See also ==
- List of jockeys
