= British Flat Jockeys Championship 2023 =

The 2023 British Flat Jockeys Championship was the competition to find the winningmost jockey in Great Britain between the Guineas Festival on 6 May 2023 and British Champions Day at Ascot on 21 October 2023. It was won by William Buick for the second time in a row. On the same day Billy Loughnane was crowned Champion Apprentice.

== Final table ==
Source -

Rank	Jockey	Wins	Rides	Strike rate
1	William Buick	135	611	22%
2	Oisin Murphy	106	668	16%
3	Rossa Ryan	104	563	18%
4	Tom Marquand	102	693	15%
5	Hollie Doyle	89	607	15%
6	Ben Curtis	81	544	15%
7	Joe Fanning	69	443	16%
8	James Doyle	67	354	19%
9	Daniel Tudhope	65	414	16%
10	Jason Hart	63	541	12%
11	Paul Mulrennan	62	524	12%
12	Hector Crouch	60	360	17%
13	Neil Callan	60	464	14%
14	Billy Loughnane	60	464	13%
15	David Egan	58	523	11%
16	Robert Havlin	57	378	15%
17	David Probert	55	489	11%
18	Saffie Osborne	52	428	12%
19	Jack Mitchell	51	328	16%
20	Callum Shepherd	51	395	13%
21	Sam James	51	398	13%
22	Richard Kingscote	50	453	11%
23	Daniel Muscutt	48	430	11%
24	Connor Beasley	47	435	11%
25	Ryan Moore	46	256	18%
