= Elis (horse) =

British-bred Thoroughbred racehorse

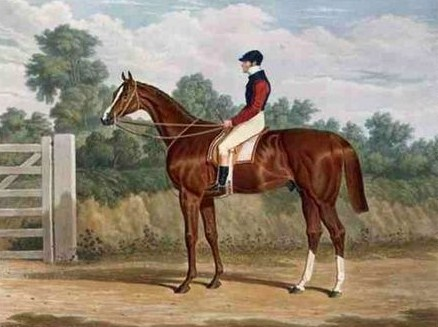
- 'Elis', the Winner of the Great St. Leger Stakes at Doncaster, 1836 by John Frederick Herring
- Sire: Langar
- Grandsire: Selim
- Dam: Olympia
- Damsire: Sir Oliver
- Sex: Stallion
- Foaled: 1833
- Country: United Kingdom
- Colour: Chestnut
- Owner: Lord George Bentinck; Charles Greville; Thomas Anson, 1st Earl of Lichfield; Sidney Herbert
- Trainer: John Doe
- Record: 15:11-4-0

Major wins
- Chesterfield Stakes (1835); Molecomb Stakes (1835); Clearwell Stakes (1835); Criterion Stakes (1835); Drawing-room Stakes (1836); Racing Stakes (1836); Lewes Stakes (1836); St Leger Stakes (1836); Match against Slane

Elis (foaled 1833) was a British Thoroughbred racehorse and sire best known for winning the classic St Leger Stakes in 1836. In a racing career which lasted from July 1835 until April 1837 he won eleven of his fifteen races. He finished second in his four defeats, two of which came when he was matched against the undefeated Bay Middleton. As a two-year-old he won five of his six races including the Chesterfield Stakes, Molecomb Stakes, Clearwell Stakes and Criterion Stakes. In 1836 he rebounded from a defeat by Bay Middleton in the 2000 Guineas to win Drawing-room Stakes, Racing Stakes, and Lewes Stakes in the summer. Elis was one of the first horses to be transported by horsebox and landed a major betting coup for his owners by winning the St Leger. He had limited impact as a sire of winners before being exported to Germany.

== Background ==
Elis was a chestnut horse with a white blaze and long white socks on his hind legs bred by Charles Greville. He was the seventh of ten foals produced by Olympia (1815–1840), a daughter of Sir Oliver. Olympia produced several other good winners including Stockport and Epirus. His sire, Langar (1817–1841) won the Gascoigne Stakes at Doncaster and many races in Ireland. He stood as a stallion in Ireland before moving to stand at Tickhill Castle in Yorkshire in 1831.

Elis was owned by Lord George Bentinck, but in an attempt to hide his interest in racing from his family Bentinck did not use his own name. Elis was officially owned by Charles Greville for his first two starts and by Thomas Anson, 1st Earl of Lichfield for the remainder of his racing career. Elis was trained by John Kent at Goodwood and by John Doe at Newmarket and was ridden in most of his races by John Barham Day.

== Racing career ==
=== 1835: two-year-old season ===
Elis was one of the best British two-year-olds of 1835, winning five of his six races. Until 1913, there was no requirement for British racehorses to have official names, and the horse who later became known as Elis began his career as Mr. Greville's Brother to Stockport. He made his racing debut at the July meeting at Newmarket Racecourse where he was one of fourteen two-year-olds to contest the Chesterfield Stakes over the last half of the Bunbury Mile course. Ridden by Day, he started the 4/1 third favourite and won from William Chifney's brother to Glaucus, the winner of the July Stakes. On his next appearance, Elis (now officially named) was ridden by Nat Flatman in the Molecomb Stakes at Goodwood Racecourse on 30 July. Carrying top weight of 120 pounds, he started odds-on favourite and won by half a length from Skirmisher.

Elis was rested until the autumn, when he ran at Newmarket's Second October meeting, where Day took over again as his jockey. On 13 October he started second favourite behind Colonel Peel's colt Slane for the Clearwell Stakes. He won the five furlong race from the filly Marmalade, with Slane unplaced. Three days later, Elis sustained his only defeat of the season when he finished second by a length to the Duke of Grafton's colt Alumnus in the Prendergast Stakes. Two weeks later, Elis had two engagements at the Newmarket Houghton meeting. On 26 October he started 6/4 favourite for the Criterion Stakes under top weight of 120 pounds, and led from the start to win "cleverly" by half a length from Slane with Mr Wags in third place. Three days later he walked over for a sweepstakes over the Abington Mile, after the other nineteen horses entered were withdrawn by their owners.

=== 1836: three-year-old season ===
Elis began his second season in the 2000 Guineas over the Rowley Mile course at Newmarket on 17 April. He started at odds of 5/2, but the 6/4 favourite was Lord Jersey's Riddlesworth Stakes winner Bay Middleton. Elis was beaten by a neck by Bay Middleton after a vigorously contested finish, with the pair finishing well clear of the other four runners. The New Sporting Magazine commented that "two faster or gamer horses have seldom been opposed to each other".

Elis had not been entered in The Derby and did not race again until the Goodwood meeting at the end of July. He started 1/2 favourite for the Drawing-room Stakes and won by three lengths from Magician and six other three-year-olds. Two days later he was matched against older horses in the Goodwood Cup and finished second to the four-year-old Hornsea, with the St Leger winner Rockingham among the unplaced runners. On the same afternoon he won the one-mile Racing Stakes from two opponents at odds of 1/10. On 10 August, Elis appeared at Lewes Racecourse in Sussex where he won the all-aged Lewes Stakes over one and a half miles from six opponents.

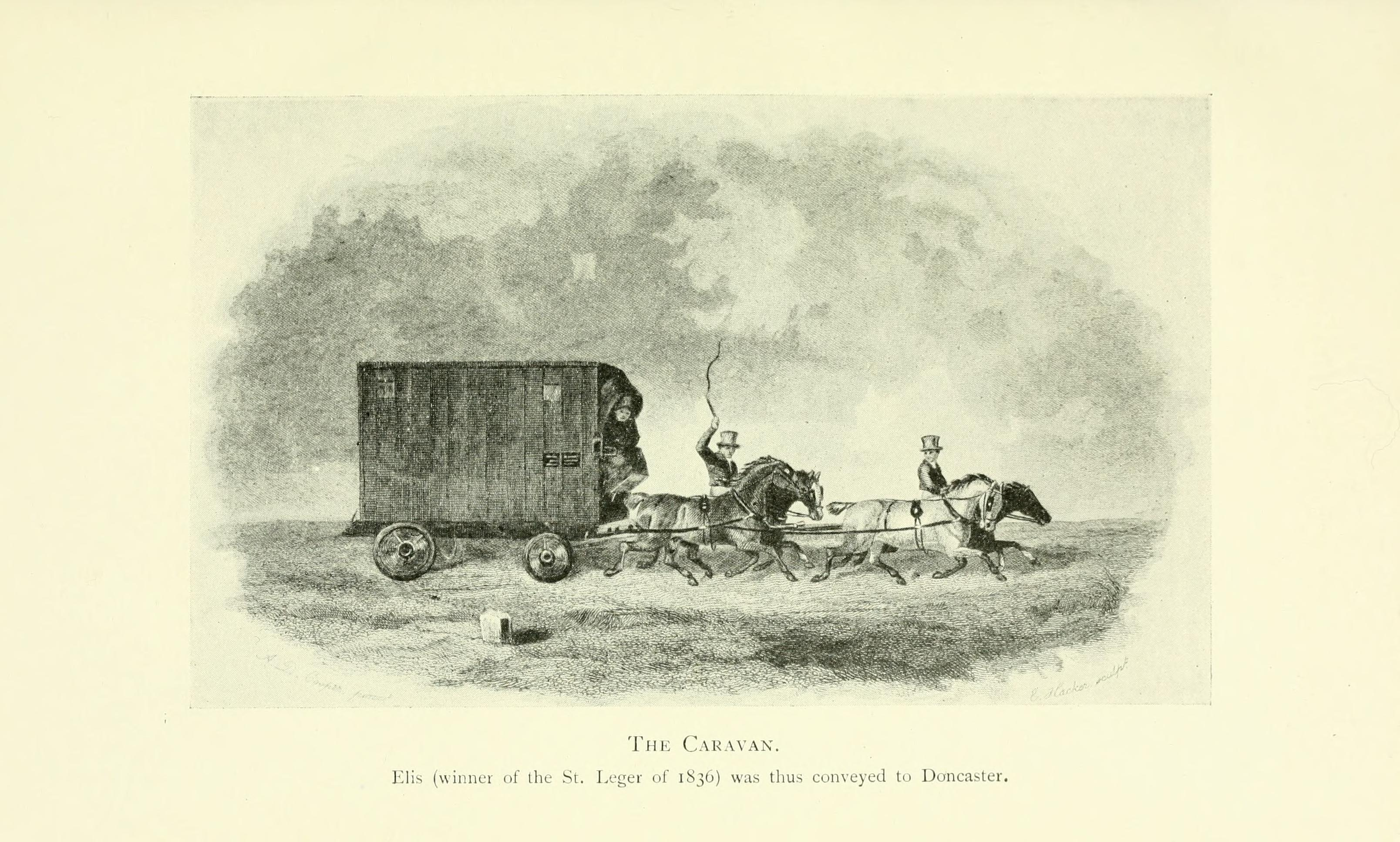
The Caravan. Elis (winner of the St. Leger of 1836) was thus conveyed to Doncaster.

From as early as the autumn 1835, Elis had been regarded as a leading contender for the St Leger at Doncaster Racecourse in late September, but when the horse was still in Goodwood a week before the race his chances appeared remote. In the 1830s, the established way for a horse to travel to a racecourse was to walk there, usually at a very gentle pace to minimise the risk of injury, and the 250 mile journey from Goodwood to Doncaster could take up to three weeks. Despite the fact that it appeared impossible for Elis to run in the St Leger he continued to be supported in the betting, which led to considerable confusion until Bentinck's plans were revealed. A specially designed carriage or "caravan" had been constructed which could be drawn at high speed by a team of horses whose members could be replaced at regular intervals. Elis and a travelling companion named The Drummer were loaded into the padded interior of the caravan and were transported to Doncaster in less than three days: there was even time to pause and give the horses an exercise gallop at Lichfield Racecourse. The project had been kept secret to allow Bentinck and his confederates to back the horse at longer odds than would otherwise been available. On 20 September, Elis started at odds of 7/2 for the St Leger, with the John Scott-trained Scroggins being made the 6/4 favourite in what was considered an unusually strong field. Ridden as usual by John Day, Elis took the lead at half way and was never seriously challenged, winning easily from Scroggins, who got the better of a "neck and neck" struggle with Beeswing for second place. The connections of the winner were reported to have taken approximately £24,000 in winning bets.

Two weeks after his victory at Doncaster, Elis was back at Newmarket for a rematch with Bay Middleton at the First October meeting. The presence of the "extraordinary pair" of classic-winning colts in the Grand Duke Michael Stakes led to the other twenty-two horses being withdrawn by their owners. Elis was beaten a length by the 2/5 favourite, but gave Bay Middleton the hardest race of his career. Elis ended his season in a ten furlong sweepstakes at the Newmarket Houghton meeting on 3 November. He ran a dead heat with Mr Wags to whom he was conceding eight pounds, and the owners decided to divide the prize money rather than running a deciding heat.

=== 1837: four-year-old season ===
Elis was kept in training as a four-year-old but made only one appearance. At the Newmarket Craven meeting on 12 April he ran a match race against Slane over the Ditch Mile course. He conceded seven pounds to his opponent and won at odds of 1/3 to claim a 300 Guinea prize.

Late in 1837, Bentinck bought Bay Middleton and sold Elis to Sidney Herbert. Elis had been scheduled to run a match over five furlongs against a filly named Vulture at Newmarket in October but did not appear for the race.

== Retirement and stud career ==
Elis was retired from racing to become a breeding stallion. He spent his British stud career at Wilton House, near Salisbury in Wiltshire at a fee of 20 guineas. In 1844 he was sold and exported to Germany. Elis was not a great success as a sire: his best runner was probably Lucy Banks, a filly who won the Craven Stakes and the Goodwood Stakes although three of his German-bred daughters won the Preis der Diana.

In May 2012, the Welbeck Abbey Brewery named one of its speciality Mild ales Elis in honour of the horse.

== Pedigree ==
Pedigree of Elis (GB), chestnut stallion, 1833
Sire Langar (GB) 1817	Selim; 1802	Buzzard	Woodpecker^
Sire Langar (GB) 1817	Selim; 1802	Buzzard	Misfortune
Sire Langar (GB) 1817	Selim; 1802	Alexander mare	Alexander
Sire Langar (GB) 1817	Selim; 1802	Alexander mare	Highflyer mare^
Sire Langar (GB) 1817	Walton mare 1808	Walton	Sir Peter Teazle*^
Sire Langar (GB) 1817	Walton mare 1808	Walton	Arethusa
Sire Langar (GB) 1817	Walton mare 1808	Young Giantess	Diomed*^
Sire Langar (GB) 1817	Walton mare 1808	Young Giantess	Giantess
Dam Olympia (GB) 1815	Sir Oliver; 1800	Sir Peter Teazle*	Highflyer^
Dam Olympia (GB) 1815	Sir Oliver; 1800	Sir Peter Teazle*	Papillon
Dam Olympia (GB) 1815	Sir Oliver; 1800	Fanny	Diomed*^
Dam Olympia (GB) 1815	Sir Oliver; 1800	Fanny	Ambrosia^
Dam Olympia (GB) 1815	Scotilla; 1795	Anvil	Herod^
Dam Olympia (GB) 1815	Scotilla; 1795	Anvil	Feather mare
Dam Olympia (GB) 1815	Scotilla; 1795	Scota	Eclipse
Dam Olympia (GB) 1815	Scotilla; 1795	Scota	Harmony^ (Family: 13-a)

* Elis is inbred 4S x 3D to the stallion Sir Peter Teazle, meaning that he appears fourth generation on the sire side of his pedigree and third generation on the dam side of his pedigree.

* Elis is inbred 4S x 4D to the stallion Diomed, meaning that he appears fourth generation on the sire side of his pedigree and fourth generation on the dam side of his pedigree.

^ Elis is inbred 5S x 6S x 6S x 6S x 5D x 6D x 6D x 4D x 5D to the stallion Herod, meaning that he appears fifth generation once (via Woodpecker)^ and sixth generation thrice (via Highflyer mare, Sir Peter Teazle, and Diomed)^ on the sire side of his pedigree and sixth generation twice (via Diomed and Ambrosia)^, fourth generation once, and fifth generation once (via Harmony)^ on the dam side of his pedigree.
