= Amy Ryan (jockey) =

English jockey

Personal information
- Occupations: Jockey and TV presenter

Horse racing career
- Sport: Horse racing

Racing awards
- British flat racing Lady Amateur Champion Jockey (2008); British flat racing Champion Apprentice (2012); Lester Awards; Apprentice Jockey of the Year (2012)
- Updated on 22 October 2023

Amy Ryan is a former flat racing jockey and current TV pundit, who was the 2012 British flat racing Champion Apprentice.

== Racing career ==
She is from Hambleton, North Yorkshire and is the daughter of trainer Kevin Ryan. She started out as an amateur jockey, riding 15 winners and becoming 2008 lady amateur champion.

She turned professional in 2009 and her first win came at Wolverhampton in a Class 6, 5 furlong sprint on Harry Up on 26 February, winning by 3 and a 1/4 lengths. Harry Up had also been her first winner as an amateur, aged 16. A week later she won on Grimes Faith at Southwell, but saved the rest of her seven-pound claim for the turf season. At the time, she said that riding "is all I have ever wanted to do”, but her Dad "wasn't too keen on the idea" of her becoming an apprentice before she had more experience. She spoke of her ambition to become Champion Apprentice of 2010. While still a 5lb claimer, she won the biggest prize pot of her career - the £93,000 totesport.com Challenge Cup Heritage Handicap at Ascot in September 2009, on the 33/1 Advanced, trained by her father.

She finally rode out her apprentice claim in May 2012 and ended the year as Champion Apprentice, the first woman to win it outright. Throughout the season, Darren Egan had been the leading apprentice, but Ryan caught him up while he was under a ban and after he broke his collarbone in a fall at Wolverhampton, she was able to forge ahead. She was presented with the award by Hayley Turner, herself a former Champion Apprentice. Turner had just beaten her to the inaugural Female Jockeys' Championship. One of the highlights of her year had been winning for her father on Laffan on Oaks day at Epsom Turner commented on how "she's a very good rider, she can read a race well. She can go to plan B if plan A doesn't work, she's a quick thinker. And I think in particular this year, she's strengthened up in a finish and become tidier." This assessment of her performance was backed up by computer analysis by John Whitley of Racing Research, which since January 2011 had her rated as about halfway between their top jockey Ryan Moore and an average flat jockey, which Whitley called "an impressive figure for a young rider".

She had a bad fall at York on her first ride back on 27 July. She rode fewer races after this. In 2013, she raced 149 times, around a third of the amount of rides she had had the previous year, winning 12. In 2014, she won 4 from 46 and had her final professional rides to date in 2015, winning 3 from 21. A horse flipped over on her and snapped the ligaments of her ankle, which took a long time to heal and led to surgery at the beginning of 2017. At that point, she decided to quit riding while she "was in one piece" and even stopped riding out as she missed race riding so much.

== Current work ==
She is now a pundit on Racing TV, among other media work. She is also raceday presenter at Redcar Racecourse and rides out for her father, and in occasional "legends" races.

== See also ==
- List of jockeys
