= Houghton Mares' Chase =

Steeplechase horse race in Britain

- Class: Listed
- Location: Carlisle Racecourse; Cumbria, England
- Inaugurated: 2015
- Race type: Steeplechase
- Sponsor: pricedup.bet
- Website: Carlise

Race information
- Distance: 2 miles 4 furlongs (4,023 metres)
- Surface: Turf
- Track: Right-handed
- Qualification: Four-years-old and up fillies & mares
- Purse: £40,000 (2025); 1st: £22,780

Houghton Mares' Chase
2025
Paggane	Telepathique	Apple Away

Previous years
2024
Terresita	Galia Des Liteaux	El Elefante
2023
Zambella	Burrows Diamond	Sacre Coeur
2022
Zambella	Maid O'Malley	Annie Mc
2021
Zambella	Annie Mc	Elimay

2020-2015
2020
My Old Gold	Chilli Filli	Happy Diva
2019
Casablanca Mix	Holly Flight	Listen Dear
2018
Pearl Royale	Rons Dream	Only two finished
2017
Benie Des Dieux	Tacenda	Verona Opera
2015
Emily Gray	Gitane Du Berlais	Jennys Surprise

The Houghton Mares' Chase is a Listed steeplechase in Great Britain which is open to fillies and mares aged four years or older. It is run at Carlise over a distance of about 2 miles and 4 furlongs (4,023 metres), and during its running there are sixteen fences to be jumped. It is scheduled to take place in later November or early December each year. The race was first run in 2015 as the ApolloBet Mares' Chase as part of a British Horseracing Authority move to enhance the National Hunt racing programme for mares.

== Winners ==
Year	Winner	Age	Jockey	Trainer
2015	Emily Gray	7	David Bass	Kim Bailey
	no race 2016 (Note: The 2016 race was abandoned due to frost.)
2017	Benie des Dieux	6	David Mullins	Willie Mullins
2018	Pearl Royale	6	Danny Cook	Nigel Hawke
2019	Casablanca Mix (Note: The 2019, 2021 & 2023 races were run at Aintree after the original fixtures at Carlisle were abandoned.)	7	Nico de Boinville	Nicky Henderson
2020	My Old Gold	10	Brian Hughes	Nicky Richards
2021	Zambella	6	Daryl Jacob	Nigel Twiston-Davies
2022	Zambella	7	Daryl Jacob	Nigel Twiston-Davies
2023	Zambella	8	Daryl Jacob	Nigel Twiston-Davies
2024	Terresita	7	Gavin Sheehan	Lucy Wadham
2025	Paggane	6	Harry Cobden	Faye Bramley
2026	Obsessedwithyou	7	Sam Twiston-Davies	Jamie Snowden

== See also ==
- Horse racing in Great Britain
- List of British National Hunt races
