= Lincoln Handicap =

- Class: Handicap
- Location: Doncaster Racecourse; Doncaster, England
- Inaugurated: 1853
- Race type: Flat / Thoroughbred
- Sponsor: William Hill
- Website: Doncaster

Race information
- Distance: 1 mile (1,609 metres)
- Surface: Turf
- Track: Straight
- Qualification: Four-years-old and up
- Weight: Handicap
- Purse: £150,000 (2024); 1st: £77,310

Lincoln Handicap
2026
Urban Lion	Rogue Diplomat	Tribal Chief

Previous years
2025
Godwinson	Oliver Show	Orandi
2024
Mr Professor	Lattam	Navagio
2023
Migration	Awaal	Baradar
2022
Johan	Saleymm	Rogue Bear
2021
Haqeeqy	Brunch	Hortzadar

2020-2011
2019
Auxerre	Kynren	Beringer
2018
Addeybb	Lord Glitters	Mitchum Swagger
2017
Bravery	Oh This Is Us	Donncha
2016
Secret Brief	Bravo Zolo	Battle Of Marathon
2015
Gabrial	Mondialiste	Moohaarib
2014
Ocean Tempest	Tullius	Robert The Painter
2013
Levitate	Global Village	Brae Hill
2012
Brae Hill	Mull Of Killough	Fury
2011
Sweet Lightning	Brae Hill	Dubai Hills

2010-2001
2010
Penitent	Prime Exhibit	Mull Of Killough
2009
Expresso Star	Zaahid	Flipando
2008
Smokey Oakey	Blythe Knight	Babodana
2007
Very Wise	Rio Riva	Mutawaffer
2006
Blythe Knight	Royal Island	Capable Guest
2005
Stream of Gold	New Seeker	Common World
2004
Babodana	Quito	Dark Charm
2003
Pablo	Selective	Norton
2002
Zucchero	Adiemus	I Cried For You
2001
Nimello	Highland Reel	King Priam

2000-1991
2000
John Ferneley	King Priam	Right Wing
1999
Right Wing	Captain Scott	Night Of Glass
1998
Hunters Of Brora	King Of Tunes	Right Wing
1997
Kuala Lipis	Hawksley Hill	Tumbleweed Ridge
1996
Stone Ridge	Roving Minstrel	Barbaroja
1995
Roving Minstrel	Moving Arrow	Mr Martini
1994
Our Rita	Just You Dare	Wainwright
1993
High Premium	Mizaaya	Will Of Steel
1992
High Low	Mudaffar	Democratic
1991
Amenable	St Ninian	Band On The Run

1990-1988
1990
Evichstar	Vilanika	Inishpour
1989
Fact Finder	Ottergayle	Eradicate
1988
Cuvee Charlie	Silver Haze	Miss Cuddles

The Lincoln Handicap is a flat handicap horse race in Great Britain open to horses aged four years or older. It is run over a distance of 1 mile (1,609 metres) at Doncaster in late March or early April.

It is traditionally the feature event on the first Saturday of Britain's turf flat racing season. It usually takes place one or two weeks before the Grand National, and for betting purposes the two races form the Spring Double. The only jockey to have ever won both legs was Dave Dick in 1956.

== History ==
An event called the Lincolnshire Handicap was established at Lincoln in 1849. It was run over a distance of 2 miles in August.

The venue introduced the Lincoln Spring Handicap at a new fixture in March 1853. The first two runnings were over 1½ miles, and it was shortened to a mile in 1855. The summer race ended when the meeting was temporarily discontinued in the 1850s. The spring version was renamed the Lincolnshire Handicap in 1860.

The race continued to be held at Lincoln until 1964. It was transferred to Doncaster in 1965, following the closure of its former venue. From this point it was known as the Lincoln Handicap.

The bookmaker William Hill supported the Lincoln Handicap for several years prior to 1997. The company started a new period of sponsorship in 2006 which ran until 2014, and from 2015 to 2017 the race was sponsored by the bookmakers Betway. In 2018, it was sponsored by 32Red and since 2019 Unibet have sponsored the race.

The names of the winning horses from 1926 (King of Clubs) to 1937 (Marmaduke Jinks) are used in the Waddingtons board game Totopoly.

== Records ==
Most successful horse (2 wins):

- Ob – 1906, 1907
- Babur – 1957, 1958

Leading jockey (4 wins):

- Charlie Maidment – Indigestion (1868), Royal Rake (1870), Guy Dayrell (1872), Vestminster (1873)

Leading trainer (5 wins):

- William Haggas - High Low (1992), Very Wise (2007), Penitent (2010), Addeybb (2018), Godwinson (2025)

== Winners since 1900 ==
- Weights given in stones and pounds.

Year	Winner	Age	Weight	Jockey	Trainer	SP	Time
1900	Sir Geoffrey	5	8-06	Mornington Cannon	Charles Archer	100/12
1901	Little Eva	6	7-05	Otto Madden	John Powney	100/15 F	1:42.40
1902	St Maclou	4	7-12	George McCall	Charles Beatty	100/8	1:47.20
1903	Over Norton	6	7-06	Otto Madden	Charlie Waugh	100/7
1904	Uninsured	4	7-10	Bernard Dillon	Jack Fallon	9/2 F	1:46.60
1905	Sansovino	4	7-06	William Griggs	Charlie Waugh	100/9	1:48.60
1906	Ob	5	8-00	George Bellhouse	Richard Carter Sr.	20/1	1:44.60
1907	Ob	6	8-10	George Stern	Richard Carter Sr.	25/1	1:45.20
1908	Kaffir Chief	6	7-11	Skeets Martin	George Chaloner	100/7	1:47.60
1909	Duke of Sparta	5	6-11	James Howard	Alf Sadler Jr.	20/1	1:44.80
1910	Cinderello	5	7-02	Joseph Plant	Jack Robinson	9/1	1:46.00
1911	Mercutio	6	8-04	Charlie Trigg	Joe Cannon	100/12	1:43.60
1912	Long Set	5	8-02	Billy Higgs	James Batho	13/2	1:44.60
1913	Berrilldon	4	7-04	Herbert Robbins	H Medcalfe	100/7	1:46.00
1914	Outram	5	7-01	Reginald Stokes	Samuel Pickering	25/1	1:44.40
1915	View Law	4	6-01	Peter Jones	John Bramley	6/1 JF	1:43.40
1916 (Note: Run as the "Lincolnfield Handicap" at Lingfield Park.)	Clap Gate	5	7-00	Ted Gardner	Frank Barling	6/1 F	1:51.40
1917–18	no race
1919	Royal Bucks	6	7-05	George Hulme	Bob Siever	14/1	1:47.20
1920	Furious	4	7-04	Herbert Robbins	Percy Woodland	33/1	1:49.20
1921	Soranus	4	8-04	Bernard Carslake	Etienne De Mestre	33/1	1:47.60
1922	Granely	4	7-09	Steve Donoghue	Harry Cottrill	20/1	1:43.20
1923	White Bud	6	6-05	John Beasley	John McCall Jr.	66/1	1:45.60
1924	Sir Gallahad	4	8-05	Frank O'Neill	Robert Denman	9/2 F	1:46.40
1925	Tapin	4	8-07	Steve Donoghue	C Bartholomew	9/1	1:47.00
1926	King of Clubs	6	6-02	Pat Donoghue	William Bellerby	100/1	1:42.80
1927	Priory Park	5	7-07	Freddie Fox	Charles Peck	20/1	1:42.40
1928	Dark Warrior	4	8-02	Bobby Jones	Fred Templeman	28/1	1:46.60
1929	Elton	4	7-02	Kenneth Robertson	Harvey Leader	100/1
1930	Leonidas II	5	8-00	Herbert Southey	Samuel H Darling	66/1	1:43.40
1931	Knight Error	5	7-07	Freddie Fox	Percy Whitaker	100/9	1:45.60
1932	Jerome Fandor	4	6-13	Willie Christie	Harry Peacock	40/1	1:44.80
1933	Dorigen	4	9-01	Tommy Weston	George Lambton	25/1	1:54.20
1934	Play On	4	7-08	Johnny Dines	James Russell	100/9	1:43.00
1935	Flamenco	4	9-00	Eph Smith	Jack Jarvis	8/1	1:40.40
1936	Over Coat	5	7-12	Tommy Weston	James Russell	10/1	1:43.80
1937	Marmaduke Jinks	5	8-00	Doug Smith	Harry Peacock	33/1	1:56.80
1938	Phakos	4	8-03	Eph Smith	Jack Jarvis	8/1 F	1:41.80
1939	Squadron Castle	6	7-07	Vic Mitchell	Billy Smallwood	40/1	1:48.00
1940	Quartier-Maitre	5	8-01	Gordon Richards	Ivor Anthony	7/2 F	1:47.20
1941	Gloaming	4	7-04	Dave Dick	George Lambton	100/7	1:48.80
1942 (Note: Run as the "Northern Lincoln" at Pontefract.)	Cuerdley	4	9-04	Joe Taylor	Bobby Renton	3/1
1943 (Note: Run as the "Substitute Lincoln" at Pontefract.)	Lady Electra	4	8-10	Dick Colven	Cecil Ray	9/2 F	1:42.40
1944 (Note: Run as the "Substitute Lincoln" at Pontefract.)	Backbite	5	7-08	Monte Pearson	Alex Boyd	33/1	1:46.80
1945 (Note: Run as the "Substitute Lincoln" at Pontefract.)	Double Harness	4	6-10	Derick Stansfield	Charles Elsey	33/1	1:48.40
1946	Langton Abbot	4	8-02	Tommy Weston	Ted Lambton	7/1 F	1:43.80
1947	Jockey Treble	5	6-00	Manny Mercer	Billy Smallwood	100/1	1:49.60
1948	Commissar	8	8-09	Bill Rickaby	Arthur Budgett	33/1	1:41.00
1949	Fair Judgement	4	7-10	Eph Smith	Jack Jarvis	6/1 F	1:41.00
1950	Dramatic	5	8-13	Gordon Richards	George Todd	7/1	1:46.20
1951	Barnes Park	5	8-00	Joe Sime	George Boyd	33/1	1:50.20
1952	Phariza	5	6-12	Dominic Forte	James Powell	33/1	1:48.20
1953	Sailing Light	4	7-11	Arthur Roberts	Gerald Armstrong	100/8	1:39.80
1954	Nahar	7	8-00	Jean Massard	Alec Head	100/7	1:41.40
1955	Military Court	5	8-02	Manny Mercer	Harry Wragg	8/1	1:51.40
1956	Three Star II	8	6-13	Derek Morris	H Davison	40/1	1:42.00
1957	Babur	4	7-13	Eddie Hide	Charles Elsey	25/1	1:42.60
1958	Babur	5	9-00	Edgar Britt	Charles Elsey	25/1	Not taken
1959	Marshal Pil	5	7-13	Peter Robinson	Sam Hall	15/2 F	1:44.80
1960	Mustavon	5	6-13	Norman McIntosh	Sam Hall	8/1	1:39.80
1961	Johns Court	6	7-07	Brian Lee	Eric Cousins	25/1	1:38.80
1962	Hill Royal	4	7-09	Joe Sime	Eric Cousins	50/1	1:43.80
1963	Monawin	8	7-09	Joe Sime	R Mason	25/1	1:43.60
1964	Mighty Gurkha	5	7-08	Peter Robinson	Ted Lambton	33/1	1:45.60
1965	Old Tom	6	8-07	Scobie Breasley	Peter Easterby	22/1	1:47.00
1966	Riot Act	4	8-03	Scobie Breasley	Sam Armstrong	8/1 F	1:41.20
1967	Ben Novus	5	7-10	Peter Robinson	W Hide	22/1	1:38.80
1968	Frankincense	4	9-05	Greville Starkey	John Oxley	100/8	1:42.80
1969	Foggy Bell	4	7-11	Sandy Barclay	Denys Smith	20/1	1:42.20
1970	New Chapter	4	8-01	Sandy Barclay	Sam Armstrong	100/9	1:42.40
1971	Double Cream	4	8-09	Edward Hide	Bill Elsey	30/1	1:39.80
1972	Sovereign Bill	6	8-12	Edward Hide	Peter Robinson	9/2 F	1:41.10
1973	Bronze Hill	4	7-09	Mark Birch	Peter Easterby	50/1	1:39.70
1974	Quizair	6	7-13	Taffy Thomas	Ryan Jarvis	28/1	1:43.27
1975	Southwark Star	4	7-03	Richard Fox	G Peter-Hoblyn	33/1	1:47.39
1976	The Hertford	5	8-06	Geoff Lewis	Brian Swift	20/1	1:42.50
1977	Blustery	5	7-11	Denis McKay	R Smyly	20/1	1:45.53
1978	Captain's Wings	5	7-10	Michael Wigham	Ron Boss	13/2 F	1:38.59
1979	Fair Season	5	8-10	Greville Starkey	Ian Balding	8/1	1:43.57
1980	King's Ride	4	8-12	Geoff Baxter	Bill Wightman	10/1	1:44.40
1981	Saher	5	8-12	Ray Cochrane	Ron Sheather	14/1	1:45.23
1982	King's Glory	4	8-03	Bryn Crossley	Philip Mitchell	11/1	1:40.31
1983	Mighty Fly	4	8-04	Steve Cauthen	David Elsworth	14/1	1:42.75
1984	Saving Mercy	4	8-09	Walter Swinburn	Dermot Weld	14/1	1:47.93
1985	Cataldi	4	9-10	Greville Starkey	Guy Harwood	10/1	1:47.65
1986	K-Battery	5	8-04	John Lowe	Bill Elsey	25/1	1:44.64
1987	Star of a Gunner	7	8-08	John Reid	Richard Holder	9/1	1:45.04
1988	Cuvee Charlie	4	8-01	Mark Rimmer	Hugh Collingridge	33/1	1:46.00
1989	Fact Finder	5	7-09	Tyrone Williams	Reg Akehurst	20/1	1:37.48
1990	Evichstar	6	7-12	Alan Munro	Jimmy FitzGerald	33/1	1:38.90
1991	Amenable	6	8-01	Alex Greaves	David Barron	22/1	1:42.75
1992	High Low	4	8-00	Jimmy Quinn	William Haggas	16/1	1:42.74
1993	High Premium	5	8-08	Kieren Fallon	Lynda Ramsden	16/1	1:37.90
1994	Our Rita	5	8-05	Darryll Holland	Dr Jon Scargill	16/1	1:37.97
1995	Roving Minstrel	4	8-03	Kevin Darley	Bryan McMahon	33/1	1:40.11
1996	Stone Ridge	4	8-07	Dane O'Neill	Richard Hannon Sr.	33/1	1:44.67
1997	Kuala Lipis	4	8-06	Richard Quinn	Paul Cole	11/1	1:39.02
1998	Hunters of Brora	8	9-00	Jason Weaver	James Bethell	16/1	1:41.60
1999	Right Wing	5	9-05	Richard Quinn	John Dunlop	9/2 F	1:41.60
2000	John Ferneley	5	8-10	Jimmy Fortune	Paul Cole	7/1 JF	1:41.12
2001	Nimello	5	8-09	Jimmy Fortune	Paul Cole	9/2 F	1:46.68
2002	Zucchero	6	8-13	Simon Whitworth	David Arbuthnot	33/1	1:45.44
2003	Pablo	4	8-11	Michael Hills	Barry Hills	5/1	1:39.18
2004	Babodana	4	9-10	Philip Robinson	Mark Tompkins	20/1	1:40.15
2005	Stream of Gold	4	9-00	Robert Winston	Sir Michael Stoute	5/1 F	1:38.18
2006 (Note: The race was run at Redcar in 2006 and Newcastle in 2007, both due to the temporary closure of Doncaster Racecourse as part of its redevelopment.)	Blythe Knight	6	8-10	Graham Gibbons	John Quinn	22/1	1:44.33
2007	Very Wise	5	8-11	Joe Fanning	William Haggas	9/1	1:46.18
2008	Smokey Oakey	4	8-09	Jimmy Quinn	Mark Tompkins	10/1	1:42.38
2009	Expresso Star	4	8-12	Jimmy Fortune	John Gosden	10/3 F	1:36.51
2010	Penitent	4	9-02	Johnny Murtagh	William Haggas	3/1 F	1:43.31
2011	Sweet Lightning	6	9-04	Johnny Murtagh	Michael Dods	16/1	1:38.38
2012	Brae Hill	6	9-01	Tony Hamilton	Richard Fahey	25/1	1:37.36
2013	Levitate	5	8-04	Darren Egan	John Quinn	20/1	1:41.91
2014	Ocean Tempest	5	9-03	Adam Kirby	John Ryan	20/1	1:40.17
2015	Gabrial	6	9-00	Tony Hamilton	Richard Fahey	12/1	1:39.62
2016	Secret Brief	4	9-04	William Buick	Charlie Appleby	12/1	1:46.25
2017	Bravery	4	9-01	Daniel Tudhope	David O'Meara	20/1	1:38.38
2018	Addeybb	4	9-02	James Doyle	William Haggas	5/1	1:43.56
2019	Auxerre	4	9-02	James Doyle	Charlie Appleby	5/2 F	1:36.82
	no race 2020 (Note: The 2020 running was cancelled because of the COVID-19 pandemic in the United Kingdom)
2021	Haqeeqy	4	8-12	Benoit de la Sayette	John & Thady Gosden	9/2	1:38.26
2022	Johan	5	9-04	Silvestre de Sousa	Mick Channon	28/1	1:37.34
2023	Migration	7	9-09	Benoit de la Sayette	David Menuisier	18/1	1:47.86
2024	Mr Professor	5	8-08	David Egan	Dominic Ffrench Davis	33/1	1:44.00
2025	Godwinson	5	9-04	Cieren Fallon	William Haggas	15/2	1:40.09
2026	Urban Lion	5	9-06	Edward Greatrex	Jack Channon	9/1	1:41.26

== Earlier winners ==
- 1853: Caurire
- 1854: Georgey
- 1855: Saucebox
- 1856: Flageolet
- 1857: Huntingdon
- 1858: Vandermulin
- 1859: Bel Esperanza
- 1860: Vigo
- 1861: Benbow
- 1862: Suburban
- 1863: Manrico
- 1864: Benjamin
- 1865: Gaily
- 1866: Treasure Trove
- 1867: Vandervelde
- 1868: Indigestion
- 1869: Sycee
- 1870: Royal Rake
- 1871: Vulcan
- 1872: Guy Dayrell
- 1873: Vestminster
- 1874: Tomahawk
- 1875: The Gunner
- 1876: Controversy
- 1877: Footstep
- 1878: Kaleidoscope
- 1879: Touchet
- 1880: Rosy Cross
- 1881: Buchanan
- 1882: Poulet
- 1883: Knight of Burghley
- 1884: Tonans
- 1885: Bendigo
- 1886: Fulmen
- 1887: Oberon
- 1888: Veracity
- 1889: Wise Man
- 1890: The Rejected
- 1891: Lord George
- 1892: Clarence
- 1893: Wolf's Crag
- 1894: Le Nicham
- 1895: Euclid
- 1896: Clorane
- 1897: Winkfield's Pride
- 1898: Prince Barcaldine
- 1899: General Peace

== Broadcasters ==
Network TV

- BBC Television televised the race from 1959 to 1964 inclusive.
- ITV televised from 1965-1985 and 2017–present
- Channel 4 televised from 1986-2016

Pay TV

- The Racing Channel 1995-2002
- Racing UK showed it in 2005-2006
- At The Races/Sky Sports Racing 2003-2004 and 2007–present

== See also ==
- Horse racing in Great Britain
- List of British flat horse races
- Recurring sporting events established in 1853 – this race is included under its original title, Lincoln Spring Handicap.
