= Richard Fox (jockey) =

Irish-born British jockey and actor

Richard Daniel Stuart Fox (1954–2011) was an Irish-born British jockey and actor.

Fox was born on 6 March 1954, in Cork, Ireland. He began an apprenticeship with Irish horse trainer Seamus McGrath when he was 14 years old.

He won his first race at the Curragh Cup in 1972. His other wins included the Northumberland Plate, the Lincoln Handicap, the Bunbury Cup and the Cesarewitch Handicap.

Fox retired from racing in July 1992, after a career spanning twenty years, when he broke his femur at the Salisbury Racecourse. He switched careers to acting and speaking engagements. He appeared in the 2002 film, Harry Potter and the Chamber of Secrets, as body double for Rupert Grint in the role of Ron Weasley.

Fox collapsed while shopping in Newmarket on 30 April 2011, and did not regain consciousness. He remained in hospital on life support for the next two months. Fox died at West Suffolk Hospital in Bury St Edmunds on 28 June 2011, at the age of 57. Fox was survived by his second wife, Marie, whom he married in 2007, and two children from his previous marriage, Francesca and Dominic.
