= Patrick Haslam =

- Born: 10 January 1948
- Died: 14 October 2017 (aged 69)
- Occupation: Horse trainer

Patrick Haslam (10 January 1948 – 14 October 2017) was a British racehorse trainer based in Middleham, North Yorkshire. He is notable for having trained a winner on every race course in England, Scotland and Wales. Haslam sent out more than 1,000 winners since taking out a licence in 1971.

As well as holding the distinction of saddling winners at every British racecourse with the exception of recent additions Great Leighs and Ffos Las, Haslam was the only trainer to have operated from Britain's three major training centres.

Kinnaird's victory under Kevin Darley in the Prix de l'Opéra at Longchamp in 2005 marked the highlight of Haslam's career, a Group 1 success. Haslam's big-race victories included the Group 2 Richmond Stakes and May Hill Stakes, along with the Royal Hunt Cup, Victoria Cup and Bunbury Cup, which he won twice. He achieved the feat of three winners in one day at Cheltenham.

In addition to Kinnaird, other good horses handled by him included Godstone (his first Group winner, who was awarded the 1983 Richmond Stakes, after finishing third, on the disqualification of Vacarme and Creag-An-Sgor), Maroussies Wings, Mummy's Pleasure, Hawkley, Pipe Major, Nigel's Lad and King Revo.

He died on 14 October 2017.
