= Lee Newman (jockey) =

Scottish jockey

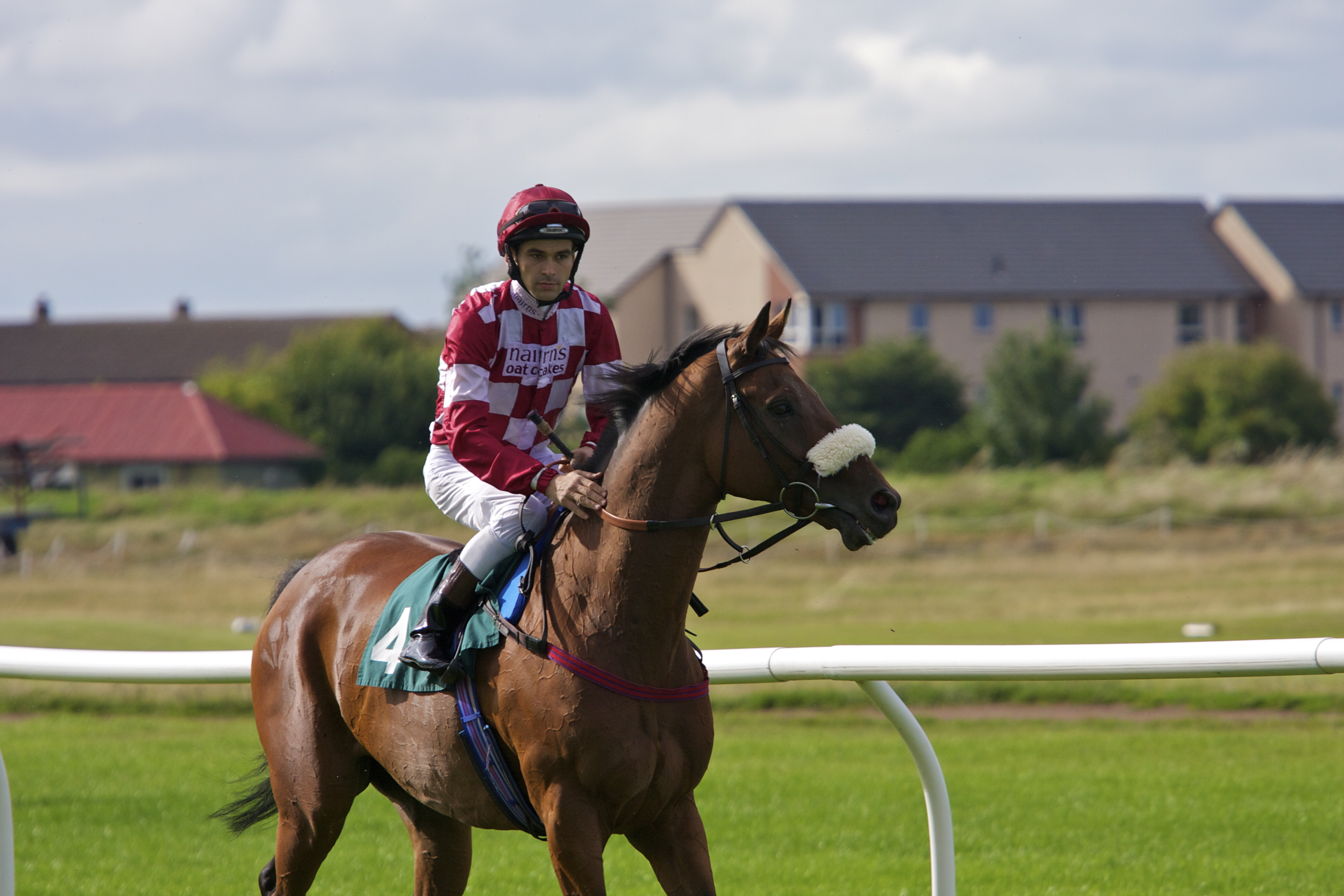
- Newman in 2010

Personal information
- Born: 25 September 1981 (age 44) Scotland
- Occupation: Jockey
- Weight: 55 kg (121 lb)

Horse racing career
- Sport: Horse racing
- Updated on 24 October 2023

Lee Newman (born 25 September 1981) is a flat racing jockey, who was the British flat racing Champion Apprentice in 2000.

Lee Alan Charles Newman was born in Scotland on 25 September 1981, to former flat and jump jockey Nat Newman.

He was Britain's Champion Apprentice flat jockey in 2000 with 87 winners, when apprenticed to Richard Hannon, Sr. He rode winners for the Queen, the Aga Khan and Sheikh Mohammed. In 2002, a car crash caused his weight to spiral out of control, and he quit riding. He returned in 2010 with 43 winners, but a back injury forced him to quit again the next year. For four years, he ran a betting shop in Barbados. His biggest British win was on Misty Eyed in the Group 3 Molecomb Stakes in 2000, which in that year was named in honour of the Queen Mother's 100th Birthday.

In 2015, he was offered a job in Mornington, Western Australia by Sam Pritchard-Gordon. He then went full time again with trainer Fred Kersley in July 2016, riding at a minimum weight of 55 kg. Unfortunately, he would again suffer serious injury. On 1 April 2017, he damaged his spleen and ribs in a three-horse pile up at Ascot in Australia, and spent five months recovering. Shortly after New Year, he was in hospital again after fracturing four vertebrae after a fall in Pinjarrah which kept him out for a year.

He left for a spell riding in Bahrain in the winter of 2019, where he had by far the biggest success of his career on Simsir in the £500,000 Bahrain International Trophy at Sakhir Racecourse on 20 November 2020. He has also ridden two Group 3 winners in Australia - I'm Feeling Lucky in the La Trice Classic on New Year's Day 2018 and Gatting in the Hyperion Stakes on 15 June 2019.

== See also ==
- List of jockeys
