= Molecomb Stakes =

Flat horse race in Britain

- Class: Group 3
- Location: Goodwood Racecourse; W. Sussex, England
- Inaugurated: 1829
- Race type: Flat / Thoroughbred
- Sponsor: HKJC World Pool
- Website: www.goodwood.com/horseracing/

Race information
- Distance: 5f (1,006 metres)
- Surface: Turf
- Track: Straight
- Qualification: Two-year-olds
- Weight: 9 st 3 lb Allowances; 3 lb for fillies Penalties; 5 lb for G1 / G2 winners 3 lb for G3 winners
- Purse: £100,000 (2025); 1st: £56,710

Molecomb Stakes
2026
Pershaada	Adonius	Hell Of A Spin

Previous years
2025
Lady Iman	Argentine Tango	Dickensian
2024
Big Mojo	Aesterius	Mr Lightside
2023
Big Evs	Purosangue	Kylian
2022
Trillium	Rocket Rodney	Walbank
2021
Armor	Fearby	Boonie

2020-2011
2020
Steel Bull	Ben Macdui	Internationaldream
2019
Liberty Beach	Alligator Alley	Show Me Show Me
2018
Rumble Inthejungle	Life of Riley	Soldier's Call
2017
Havana Grey	Invincible Army	To Wafij
2016
Yalta	The Last Lion	Global Applause
2015
Kachy	King Of Rooks	Rouleau
2014
Cotai Glory	Fast Act	Beacon
2013
Brown Sugar	Anticipated	Ambiance
2012
Bungle Inthejungle	Morawij	Hototo
2011
Requinto	Burwaaz	Charles The Great

2010-2001
2010
Zebedee	Stone Of Folca	Choose Wisely
2009
Monsieur Chevalier	Mister Manannan	Archers Road
2008
Finjaan	Bonnie Charlie	Jargelle
2007
Fleeting Spirit	Kingsgate Native	Captain Gerrard
2006
Enticing	Wi Dud	Bahama Mama
2005
Strike Up The Band	Pickett	Waterways
2004
Tournedos	Mary Read	Safari Sunset
2003
Majestic Missile	Nights Cross	Dallaah
2002
Wunders Dream	Sir Edwin Landseer	Folio
2001
Whitbarrow	Irony	Brigadore

2000-1991
2000
Misty Eyed	Bouncing Bowdler	Red Millennium
1999
Misty Miss	Fez	Alfailak
1998
Inya Lake	Amazing Dream	Speedy James
1997
Lady Alexander	Mugello	Chieftain
1996
Carmine Lake	Connemara	Deep Finesse
1995
Almaty	Cayman Kai	Baize
1994
Hoh Magic	Raghida	Che Sara Sara
1993
Risky	Imperial Bailiwick	Isabella Sharp
1992
Millyant	Palacegate Episode	Niche
1991
Sahara Star	Another Episode	Regal Chimes

1990-1988
1990
Poets Cove	It's All Academic	Seductress
1989
Haunting Beauty	Red Henry	Boozy
1988
Almost Blue	Paddy Chalk	Konbola

The Molecomb Stakes is a Group 3 flat horse race in Great Britain open to two-year-old horses. It is run at Goodwood over a distance of 5 furlongs (1,006 metres), and it is scheduled to take place each year in late July or early August.

== History ==
The event is named after Molecomb, a house on the Goodwood Estate originally built by the 3rd Duke of Richmond for his sister Lady Sarah Lennox. The race was established in 1829, and the inaugural running was won by Convert.

The Molecomb Stakes was originally open to two-year-olds of either gender, but it was restricted to fillies in 1932. It was reopened to colts and geldings in 1981.

The race is currently held on the second day of the five-day Glorious Goodwood meeting.

== Records ==
Leading jockey (8 wins):

- Lester Piggott – Abelia (1957), Smooth (1966), Flying Legs (1968), Lady Rowley (1974), Hayloft (1975), Marwell (1980), Prowess Prince (1981), Precocious (1983)

Leading trainer (7 wins):

- John Barham Day – Waresti (1834), Grey Momus (1837), Wapiti (1838), Crucifix (1839), The Ugly Buck (1843), Nutbourne (1844), Elmsthorpe (1852)
- John Porter – Red Hazard (1877), St Blaise (1882), Luminary (1884), Freedom (1886), Friar's Balsam (1887), La Fleche (1891), Rampion (1895)

== Winners since 1900 ==
Year	Winner	Jockey	Trainer	Time
1900	Princess Melton	Lester Reiff	Jarvis
1901	filly by Melton	Skeets Martin	Gilbert
1902	Quintessence	Herbert Randall	James Chandler	1:15.00
1903	Islesman
1904	Vedas	George McCall	William Robinson
1905	Colonia	Herbert Jones	William Robinson
1906	My Pet II	Danny Maher	Dawson Waugh
1907	Sea King	Billy Higgs	Tom Waugh
1908	Perdiccas	Billy Higgs	Sam Darling
1909	Tressady	Billy Higgs	Sam Darling
1910	Beaurepaire	Herbert Jones	Dawson Waugh
1911	White Star	Frank Wootton	Charles Morton
1912	Rock Flint	Danny Maher	George Blackwell	1:16.00
1913	Black Jester	Frank Wootton	Charles Morton
1914	Redfern	Steve Donoghue	Alec Taylor Jr.	1:13.80
1915–18	no race
1919	Tetratema	Bernard Carslake	Atty Persse
1920	Trash	Joe Childs	Alec Taylor Jr.
1921	Lembach	Frank Bullock	Reg Day	1:16.80
1922	Town Guard	George Archibald Sr.	Peter Gilpin
1923	Mumtaz Mahal	George Hulme	Richard Dawson	1:15.00
1924	Priory Park	Frank Bullock	Clancy	1:14.20
1925	Review Order	Harry Beasley Jr.	Atty Persse	1:16.40
1926	Shian Mor	Henri Jelliss	Basil Jarvis	1:14.00
1927	Black Watch	Sir Gordon Richards	Peter Gilpin	1:15.20
1928	Belle Mere	Jack Leach	Felix Leach	1:13.20
1929	Diolite	Cecil Ray	Fred Templeman	1:13.80
1930	Jacopo	Joe Childs	Cecil Boyd-Rochfort	1:14.20
1931	Safe Return	Freddie Fox	Fred Darling	1:17.20
1932	Betty	Bobby Dick	Joseph Lawson	1:05.20
1933	Light Brocade	Bernard Carslake	Frank Butters	1:01.00
1934	La Gaiete	Richard Perryman	Frank Butters	1:01.00
1935	Crosspatch	Tommy Lowrey	Basil Jarvis	1:00.60
1936	Bright Beam	Sir Gordon Richards	Fred Darling	1:04.80
1937	Ann Of Austria	Charlie Smirke	Frank Butters	0:59.00
1938	Money Down	Sir Gordon Richards	Fred Darling	1:00.20
1939	Allure	Michael Beary	Victor Smyth	1:01.00
1940	no race
1941 (Note: The 1941 running was held at Newmarket)	Feberion	Richard Perryman	Joseph Lawson	1:20.20
1942–45	no race
1946	Rule Britannia	Harry Wragg	Walter Earl	1:02.20
1947	Phaetonia	Sir Gordon Richards	Fred Darling	1:00.00
1948	Integrity	Charlie Smirke	Jack Leach	1:00.80
1949	Diableretta	Sir Gordon Richards	Frank Butters	1:01.00
1950	Crawley Beauty	Sir Gordon Richards	Noel Murless	1:01.00
1951	Tayeh	Sir Gordon Richards	Marcus Marsh	1:00.60
1952	Tessa Gillian	Bill Rickaby	Jack Jarvis	1:01.00
1953	Urshalim	Charlie Smirke	Marcus Marsh	1:01.60
1954	Brave Venture	Bill Rickaby	Jack Jarvis	1:05.60
1955	Palariva	Roger Poincelet	Alec Head	0:58.40
1956	Pharsalia	Willie Snaith	Humphrey Cottrill	1:01.00
1957	Abelia	Lester Piggott	Noel Murless	1:00.40
1958	Krakenwake	Scobie Breasley	Norman Bertie	1:01.60
1959	Queensbury	Eph Smith	John Waugh	0:59.20
1960	Cynara	Joe Mercer	Harry Wragg	1:00.60
1961	La Tendresse	Ron Hutchinson	Paddy Prendergast	0:59.40
1962	Royal Indiscretion	Garnet Bougoure	Paddy Prendergast	0:59.60
1963	Crimea II	Harry Carr	Cecil Boyd-Rochfort	0:58.20
1964	Regal Pink	Garnet Bougoure	Paddy Prendergast	1:00.40
1965	Reet Lass	Brian Connorton	Snowy Gray	1:02.80
1966	Smooth	Lester Piggott	Fulke Johnson Houghton	1:02.00
1967	Lowna	George Moore	Noel Murless	1:00.00
1968	Flying Legs	Lester Piggott	Michael Jarvis	0:59.20
1969	Mange Tout	Brian Foy	Ken Cundell	1:01.20
1970	Cawston's Pride	Brian Taylor	Freddie Maxwell	1:01.70
1971	Pert Lassie	Greville Starkey	Henry Cecil	1:01.08
1972	Miss Slip	Jimmy Lindley	Bill Marshall	1:02.34
1973	Bitty Girl	Bruce Raymond	Michael Jarvis	0:59.09
1974	Lady Rowley	Lester Piggott	Neville Callaghan	1:00.19
1975	Hayloft	Lester Piggott	Fulke Johnson Houghton	0:59.59
1976	Be Easy	Ron Hutchinson	John Dunlop	1:01.02
1977	Hatta	Ron Hutchinson	John Dunlop	1:01.52
1978	Greenland Park	H White	William Hastings-Bass	0:59.75
1979	Keep Off	Willie Carson	John Dunlop	1:01.58
1980	Marwell	Lester Piggott	Michael Stoute	0:58.83
1981	Prowess Prince	Lester Piggott	Eric Eldin	0:59.86
1982	Kafu	Greville Starkey	Guy Harwood	0:58.07
1983	Precocious	Lester Piggott	Henry Cecil	0:58.98
1984	Absent Chimes	Philip Robinson	David Thom	0:59.45
1985	Hotbee	Tyrone Williams	John Bridger	1:02.19
1986	Gemini Fire	Steve Cauthen	Paul Felgate	1:01.15
1987	Classic Ruler	John Reid	Charlie Nelson	0:59.33
1988	Almost Blue	John Carroll	Jack Berry	1:01.16
1989	Haunting Beauty	Pat Eddery	Jimmy Etherington	1:00.15
1990	Poets Cove (Note: Jimmy Barnie finished first in 1990, but he was relegated to fourth place following a stewards' inquiry)	John Reid	Wally Carter	0:57.53
1991	Sahara Star	John Reid	Michael Stoute	0:59.14
1992	Millyant	Michael Roberts	Rae Guest	0:57.58
1993	Risky	Walter Swinburn	Richard Hannon Sr.	1:00.77
1994	Hoh Magic	Michael Hills	Michael Bell	0:57.75
1995	Almaty	Kevin Darley	Con Collins	0:58.17
1996	Carmine Lake	John Reid	Peter Chapple-Hyam	0:58.32
1997	Lady Alexander	Pat Shanahan	Con Collins	1:00.12
1998	Inya Lake	Richard Quinn	Mick Channon	0:59.96
1999	Misty Miss	John Egan	David Evans	0:58.37
2000	Misty Eyed	Lee Newman	Nerys Dutfield	0:58.48
2001	Whitbarrow	Basil Marcus	Rod Millman	0:58.25
2002	Wunders Dream	Micky Fenton	James Given	0:58.28
2003	Majestic Missile	Michael Hills	William Haggas	0:58.83
2004	Tournedos	Ted Durcan	Mick Channon	0:58.54
2005	Strike Up the Band	Adrian Nicholls	David Nicholls	0:58.36
2006	Enticing	Michael Hills	William Haggas	0:59.19
2007	Fleeting Spirit	Johnny Murtagh	Jeremy Noseda	0:57.96
2008	Finjaan	Richard Hills	Marcus Tregoning	0:57.88
2009	Monsieur Chevalier	Richard Hughes	Richard Hannon Sr.	0:58.24
2010	Zebedee	Richard Hughes	Richard Hannon Sr.	0:58.49
2011	Requinto	Wayne Lordan	David Wachman	0:57.51
2012	Bungle Inthejungle	Martin Harley	Mick Channon	0:58.22
2013	Brown Sugar	Pat Dobbs	Richard Hannon Sr.	0:59.30
2014	Cotai Glory	George Baker	Charles Hills	0:57.30
2015	Kachy	Richard Kingscote	Tom Dascombe	0:58.55
2016	Yalta	James Doyle	Mark Johnston	0:57.14
2017	Havana Grey	P. J. McDonald	Karl Burke	1:00.89
2018	Rumble Inthejungle	Tom Queally	Richard Spencer	0:58.22
2019	Liberty Beach	Jason Hart	John Quinn	0:58.88
2020	Steel Bull	Colin Keane	Michael O'Callaghan	0:58.59
2021	Armor	Ryan Moore	Richard Hannon Jr.	0:59.26
2022	Trillium	Pat Dobbs	Richard Hannon Jr.	0:56.58
2023	Big Evs	Jason Hart	Michael Appleby	1:01.27
2024	Big Mojo	Silvestre de Sousa	Michael Appleby	0:56.13
2025	Lady Iman	Ryan Moore	Ger Lyons	0:57.16
2026	Pershaada	Sean Levey	Richard Hannon Jr.	0:56.82

== Earlier winners ==
- 1829: Convert
- 1830: filly by Emilius
- 1831–32: no race
- 1833: Defensive
- 1834: Waresti
- 1835: Elis
- 1836: Defender
- 1837: Grey Momus
- 1838: Wapiti
- 1839: Crucifix
- 1840: Decision
- 1841: Barrier
- 1842: The Caster
- 1843: The Ugly Buck
- 1844: Nutbourne
- 1845: Sting
- 1846: Planet
- 1847: Glendower
- 1848: Mr Milner
- 1849: William the Conqueror
- 1850: Teddington
- 1851: Glenluce
- 1852: Elmsthorpe
- 1853: Andover
- 1854: Polydore
- 1855: Enchanter
- 1856: Lambourn
- 1857: The Lord of Lorn
- 1858: Merryman
- 1859: Buccaneer
- 1860: Diophantus
- 1861: Ace of Clubs
- 1862: colt by Lord of the Isles
- 1863: Fille de l'Air
- 1864: Koenig
- 1865: The Student
- 1866: Marksman
- 1867: Banditto
- 1868: Belladrum
- 1869: Mantilla
- 1870: General
- 1871: Vanderdecken
- 1872: Somerset
- 1873: Packington
- 1874: Craig Millar
- 1875: Red Cross Knight
- 1876: Shillelagh
- 1877: Red Hazard
- 1878: colt by Cambuscan
- 1879: Brotherhood
- 1880: Paw Paw
- 1881: Adrastus
- 1882: St Blaise
- 1883: La Trappe
- 1884: Luminary
- 1885: The Devil to Pay
- 1886: Freedom
- 1887: Friar's Balsam
- 1888: Seclusion
- 1889: Le Nord
- 1890: Cleator
- 1891: La Fleche
- 1892: Harbinger
- 1893: La Nievre
- 1894: Bentworth
- 1895: Rampion
- 1896: Galtee More
- 1897: Royal Footstep
- 1898: Vara
- 1899: O'Donovan Rossa

== See also ==
- Horse racing in Great Britain
- List of British flat horse races
