= Rossa Ryan =

Irish jockey (born 2000)

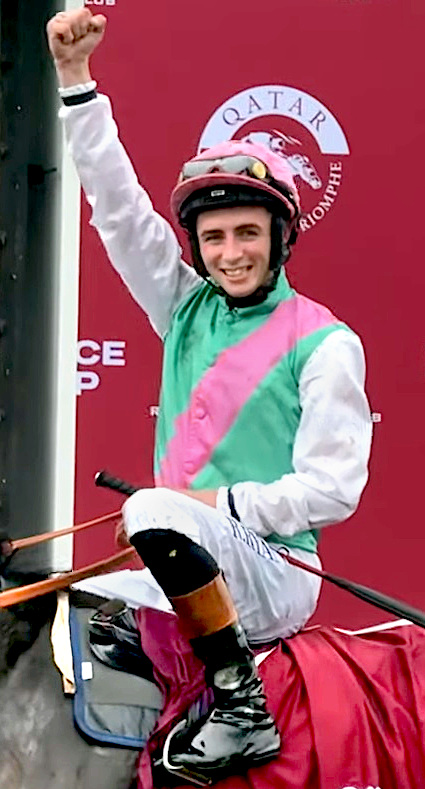
- Ryan on Bluestocking Prix de l'Arc de Triomphe 2024

Personal information
- Born: July 2000 (age 26) Tuam, County Galway, Ireland
- Occupation: Jockey

Horse racing career
- Sport: Horse racing

Major racing wins
- July Cup (2023); Prix de l'Arc de Triomphe (2024)

Racing awards
- British All-Weather Champion Jockey (2023-24)

Significant horses
- Go Bears Go; Shaquille; Bluestocking

Rossa Ryan (born July 2000) is an Irish jockey who competes in flat racing and is based in Britain. He was the British All-Weather Champion Jockey of the 2023–24 season.

== Background ==
Ryan grew up in Ballinderry, near Tuam in County Galway, where his father David Ryan has a National Hunt training yard. He was a champion rider on the pony racing circuit in Ireland, riding 150 winners, before taking out an apprentice licence. He rode his first winner under rules on 9 December 2016 on Solar Heat at Dundalk. In January 2017 he moved to England to be an apprentice at the yard of Richard Hannon.

== Career ==
Ryan finished second to Jason Watson in the 2018 British apprentice jockeys' championship. In August 2019 he achieved his first Group race success, winning the Group 2 Celebration Mile at Goodwood on Duke of Hazzard, trained by Paul Cole. In June 2020 he rode his first Royal Ascot winner on Highland Chief, trained by Paul and Oliver Cole, in the Golden Gates Handicap. The following month he accepted the offer of a retainer from owner Kia Joorabchian, who had horses in training with Hannon. Over the next two years he achieved five Group race victories for Joorabchian before they parted company in August 2022.

Ryan rode more than a century of winners for the first time in 2021, in spite of having to take time off for a broken collar bone and surgery to remove his appendix. Two winners at Royal Ascot in June 2023 included Valiant Force, a 150/1 outsider in the Group 2 Norfolk Stakes, owned by Ryan's former employer Joorabchian. He claimed his first Group 1 victory in the 2023 July Cup at Newmarket on Shaquille, trained by Julie Camacho. "That was the run of my life," he said after the race. He ended the season 3rd in the Jockeys' Championship with 104 winners at an 18% strike rate. Over the winter 2023–24, he won the British All-Weather Jockeys Championship with 85 victories, ahead of nearest challenger Billy Loughnane on 59.

== Major wins ==
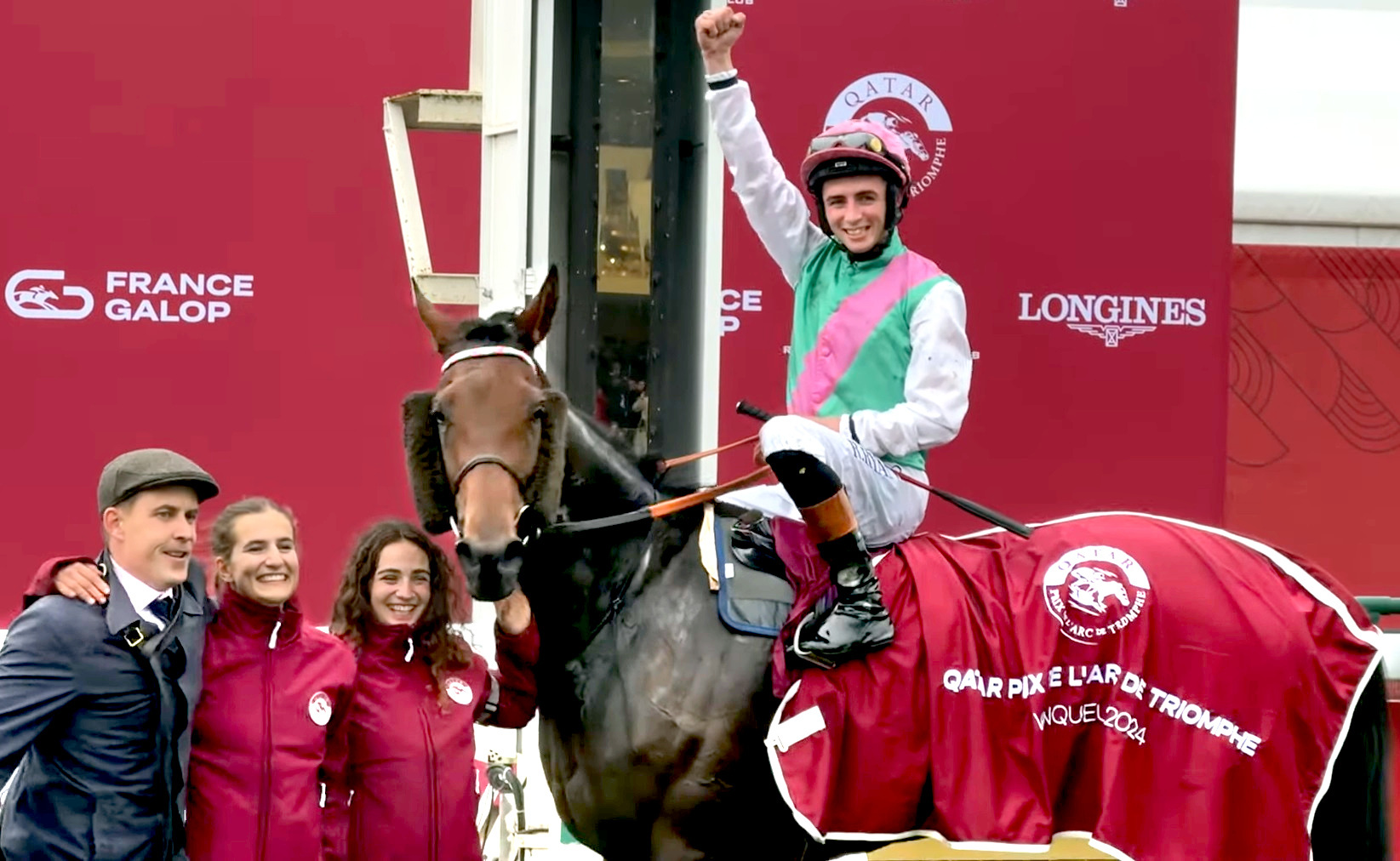
Bluestocking winning team Prix de l'Arc de Triomphe 2024

(United Kingdom) Great Britain

- July Cup - (1) - Shaquille (2023)
- Middle Park Stakes - (1) - Orthodox (2026)

(Republic of Ireland) Ireland

- Pretty Polly Stakes - (1) - Bluestocking (2024)

France

- Prix de l'Arc de Triomphe - (1) - Bluestocking (2024)
- Prix Vermeille - (1) - Bluestocking (2024)

United States

- Breeders' Cup Turf Sprint - (1) - Starlust (2024)
