= Carlisle Racecourse =

Horse racing venue in Carlisle, England

Coordinates: 54°51′40″N 2°56′00″W

Carlisle
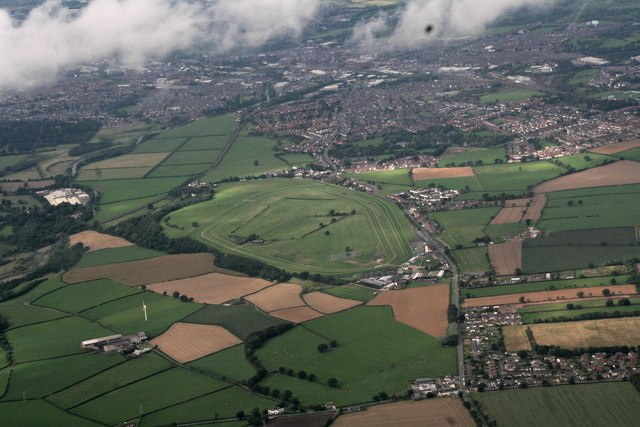
- Interactive map of Carlisle
- Location: Carlisle, Cumbria
- Owned by: Jockey Club Racecourses
- Screened on: Racing TV
- Course type: Flat; National Hunt
- Notable races: Carlisle Bell, Cumberland Chase, Cumberland Plate, Graduation Chase

Carlisle Racecourse is a thoroughbred horse racing venue located in the village of Blackwell just outside Carlisle in Cumbria, England. The course has been on its present site since 1904, when it moved there from the area known as The Swifts close to the centre of Carlisle. The course is 1 mile and 4 furlongs (2.41 km) in circumference, right-handed, and hosts flat racing in the summer and National Hunt racing over the winter months. The last half mile is up a steep incline. The going can get very heavy in the winter.

History was made on 2 July 1929 when the newly formed Totalisator Board operated their pool betting system for the first time on a British racecourse at Carlisle.

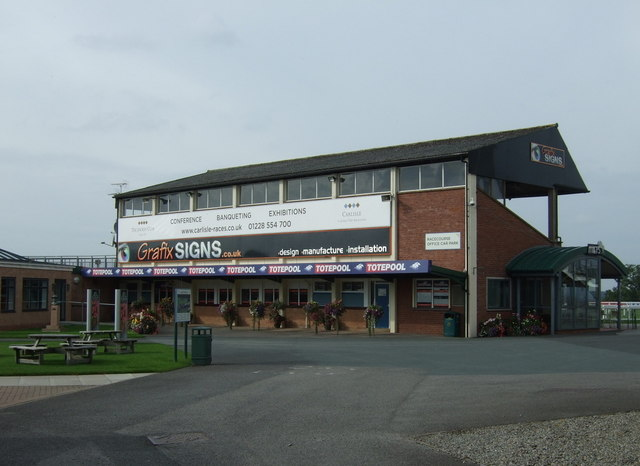
One of the stands

Carlisle is home to the Carlisle Bell, one of the oldest horse races in existence. Held annually at Carlisle Racecourse in June alongside the Cumberland Plate, the race is run over 7 furlongs and 173 yards, and although the Bell is presented ceremoniously to the winner, it is actually kept in the nearby Carlisle Guildhall Museum. The Carlisle Bell has only twice been amended – with it being run in Thirsk in 2001, and cancelled in 2020 due to the COVID-19 pandemic. Carlisle also had a King's Plate – a race for 5-year-old horses in 3-mile heats – instigated by George III in 1763.

The Carlisle Gold Bell is inscribed with "The sweftes horse thes bel to take for mi lade Daker sake", which translates to modern day English as "The swiftest horse may claim this bell in Lady Dacre's name". It continues to be given away as a prize for an annual race even today, making it one of the UK's oldest, and most prestigious, races.

== Notable races ==
Month	DOW	Race Name	Type	Grade	Distance	Age/Sex
June	Wednesday	Carlisle Bell	Flat	Handicap	7f 173y	3yo +
June	Wednesday	Eternal Stakes	Flat	Listed	6f 192y	3yo f
November	Sunday	Colin Parker Memorial Intermediate Chase	National Hunt	Listed	2m 4f	4yo +
November	Sunday	Houghton Mares' Chase	National Hunt	Listed	2m 4f	4yo + f

Other races

- Cumberland Chase
- Cumberland Plate
- Graduation Chase
