= Welbeck Abbey Brewery =

Brewery in Nottinghamshire, England

Welbeck Abbey Brewery is a brewery near Worksop, Nottinghamshire, located on the Welbeck Estate in Sherwood Forest. It specialises in making traditional real ales using a variety of yeasts.

The brewery was founded in March 2011 by the Kelham Island Brewery and the Welbeck Estates Company. Their produce is available for sale at the Welbeck Farm Shop, and it has been exhibited at local fairs including the Notts Winter Weekend festival. The brewery runs classes in ale production, and exports to over 70 countries.

Their range includes Henrietta, a golden Session IPA. In 2013, a group of female brewers got together to produce Venus Red, a 4.6% ale that went on sale that June. The project was designed to celebrate success with women brewers. In early 2020, the brewery formed a partnership with the local branch of Age UK to create a new beer, the 4.8% IPA Men in Sheds, that was created by older men looking for a project outside their isolated homes. It is named after the men's shed.

Welbeck Abbey Brewery originally housed another brewery, True North, from 2012 until it opened its own premises in Sheffield in 2015.

In common with other breweries, Welbeck Abbey saw a substantial loss in trade because of the COVID-19 pandemic, with sales in 2020 down 55% from the previous year. A significant number of staff were furloughed, but some were kept on to make sure the yeast remained in production. The Welbeck Winter Weekend, an annual event featuring produce from the Welbeck estate including the brewery, was cancelled that year.
