= Chris Catlin =

English jockey

Personal information
- Born: 6 December 1981 (age 44)
- Occupation: Jockey
- Weight: 8 st 3 lb (115 lb; 52 kg)

Horse racing career
- Sport: Horse racing
- Career wins: 1,218 (UK)

Racing awards
- British flat racing Champion Apprentice (2001); British All-Weather Champion Jockey (2007-08, 2008-09)
- Updated on 24 October 2023

Chris Catlin (born 6 December 1981) is an English professional jockey, who was 2001 British flat racing Champion Apprentice and twice British All-Weather Champion. He quit race-riding in 2016 to become a work rider for Godolphin.

== Career ==
Christopher Bernard Catlin was born in Barnet on 6 December 6 1981, the son of a Ford car worker. He attended the British Racing School and after initially being apprenticed to Ken Ivory, he joined Mick Channon shortly after leaving in 1998. He became British flat racing Champion Apprentice in 2001 with 71 winners. At Channon's, he earned the nickname "the Cat", for moving around the place quietly and unobtrusively, as well as because of his name.

His best racing partnerships came with Imperial Dancer, on whom he won two Group 3s and a Listed race in the summer of 2002, Beckermet, on whom he won two Listed races in late summer 2007 and Royal Power, on whom he achieved the biggest win of his career in the 2006 German 2,000 Guineas. Over two successive winters, 2007-08 and 2008-09, he was All-Weather Champion Jockey. In 2012, he started regularly riding for Sir Mark Prescott, who publicly praised his professionalism, and in May he reached the 1,000 winners mark, being applauded back into the weighing room by his colleagues afterwards.

His final ride was at Chelmsford for Rae Guest in February 2016. That July, he handed in his licence to join Godolphin as a work rider. His best yearly win total was 138 in 2008 and in terms of prize money, his best year was 2009, when he won £836,803. Overall, he rode 1,218 winners in Britain, with more overseas, reached a century of seasonal winners four times and rode over 1,000 rides in a season seven times.

According to Channon, Catlin "doesn't say a lot, but when he does tell you about a horse you listen" and "always put your horse in the race with a chance". Catlin said he admired Prescott for his professionalism and was grateful to Channon for giving him a chance at a crucial stage of his career.

== See also ==
- List of jockeys
