= Benoit de la Sayette =

English jockey

Personal information
- Occupation: Jockey

Horse racing career
- Sport: Horse racing

Racing awards
- British flat racing Champion Apprentice (2022)
- Updated on 24 October 2023

Benoit de la Sayette is an English-born flat racing jockey, who was British flat racing Champion Apprentice in 2022. He has been apprentice to John Gosden and is also associated with the stables of David Menuisier and Kevin Philippart De Foy.

== Career ==
De la Sayette is the son of Geoffroy de la Sayette, who rode about 250 winners in his native France and was a work rider for Godolphin, partnering champion racehorse Swain in the mid-90s. He was also a work rider for James Fanshawe and it was during a visit to the stables with his father that Benoit first sat on a racehorse properly. He also took part in pony racing and, while never a champion, it gave him a good grounding. His father sent him to France, more to learn the language than to race, but he spent five summers pony racing there and claimed that the style of racing in France, where the ponies are of a similar standard, taught him more than he would have learnt in England.

Through his father's connection with the travelling head lad, he was able to get work experience at John Gosden's yard, after which he was invited to become his apprentice - the first apprentice that the trainer had hired in 30 years. Before starting, he completed his GCSEs and completed a four-week course at the British Racing School.

His first five rides came during the COVID-affected season of 2020. His first was at Chelmsford in November. and his first victory was on Hint Of Stars at Newcastle in December for Kevin Philippart De Foy. Afterwards, Fanshawe called him "a very serious kid who has very good hands when he rides. He's a top horseman and was born to be a top jockey."

In 2021, he won 11 of his 44 races including a first major success in the Lincoln Handicap - his first race on turf - riding Haqeeqy for Gosden, but he was banned for six months after failing a drugs test.

He returned to riding in 2022 and took the Apprentice Championship after a close fought battle with Harry Davies, eventually coming out on top with 67 wins. His victories included wins on Trawlerman (for Gosden) and Caius Chorister (for Menuisier) at Glorious Goodwood and the Victoria Cup at Ascot in May.

He started 2023 in style, again taking the Lincoln Handicap, this time on Migration for Menuisier. In May, he rode out his claim when he secured his 95th winner on Spit Spot at Chelmsford, winning the apprentice handicap by a head.

== See also ==
- List of jockeys
