= Greg Fairley =

Scottish jockey (born 1987/88)

Personal information
- Born: Hawick
- Occupation: Jockey

Horse racing career
- Sport: Horse racing

Major racing wins
- Major races: Bayerisches Zuchtrennen (2010)

Racing awards
- British flat racing Champion Apprentice (2007)

Significant horses
- Lady Jane Digby
- Updated on 24 October 2023

Greg Fairley (born 1987–88) is a Group 1-winning Scottish jockey, who was British flat racing Champion Apprentice in 2007. He was banned for twelve years in 2011 for corruption, and did not ride in races again until 2025, when he regained his licence.

He grew up in Hawick and began riding on the unlicensed "flapping" circuit in the Scottish Borders, where his father Andrew had ridden more than 600 winners. From there, he joined the Mark Johnston stable in Middleham, Yorkshire in 2004, and his parents moved with him.

He became Champion Apprentice in 2007 with 65 winners, beating Liam Jones and William Buick in the process. In 2009, his yearly tally reached a personal high of 85 winners and the following year he had his first Group 1 success on Lady Jane Digby in the Bayerisches Zuchtrennen. Soon after, his career began to derail. First, a row between his mother (also his agent) and Johnston led to him leaving the stable. Then, in May 2011, he was charged by the British Horseracing Authority (BHA) of being in breach of their corruption rules. In December of that year, he and fellow jockeys Paul Doe, Kirsty Milczarek and Jimmy Quinn were banned after the charges were upheld. He and Doe were found guilty of the most serious offence - not riding a horse to its merits - and were each banned for 12 years for offences relating to 10 races between 17 January and 15 August 2009. Fairley had already handed in his licence in October, having only ridden 4 winners since the charges were brought. Fairley did not attend the hearing.

During the investigation, Fairley had made use of the Jockeys Employment and Training Scheme to retrain in forestry, and returned to Scotland to work as a tree surgeon. He also returned to flapping riding, which does not come under the BHA's auspices, and won a race in his hometown of Hawick in June 2012.

In December 2021, Fairley was given permission by the BHA to start work in the Duns yard of trainer Sandy Thomson. He applied for his riding licence in May 2024 but was turned down by the BHA. He was successful on appeal to an independent licensing committee in May 2025 and issued a statement: "Fifteen years ago I chose a path that was wrong and paid a justifiably significant price for my poor decisions. I'm incredibly grateful to the licensing committee of the BHA for giving me a second chance". He had his first ride back on 7 July 2025, coming eighth in a handicap at Ayr on Superior Council, trained by Iain Jardine.

== Major wins ==
Germany

- Bayerisches Zuchtrennen - Lady Jane Digby (2010)

== See also ==
- List of jockeys
