= Victoria Cup (horse race) =

Flat horse race in Britain

- Class: Handicap
- Location: Ascot Racecourse; Ascot, England
- Race type: Flat / Thoroughbred
- Sponsor: Lavazza
- Website: Ascot

Race information
- Distance: 7f (1,408 metres)
- Surface: Turf
- Track: Straight
- Qualification: Four-year-olds and up
- Weight: Handicap
- Purse: £100,000 (2024); 1st: £51,540

Victoria Cup
2026
The Wizard Of Eye	Great Acclaim	Tribal Chief

Previous years
2025
Hickory	Qirat	Gleneagle Bay
2024
The Wizard Of Eye	Ramazan	Bless Him
2023
Rebel Territory	Biggles	Vafortino
2022
Vafortino	Accidental Agent	River Nymph
2021
River Nymph	Eagleway	Escobar

2020-2011
2019
Cape Byron	Kynren	Kaeso
2018
Ripp Orf	Zhui Feng	Sea Fox
2017
Fastnet Tempest	George William	Zhui Feng
2016
Flash Fire	Mutawathea	Buckstay
2015
Speculative Bid	Lincoln	Hawkeyethenoo
2014
Gabriel's Lad	Glen Moss	Belgian Bill
2013
Excellent Guest	Bertiewhittle	Cape Classic
2012
Global Village	Bonnie Brae	King Of Jazz
2011
Hawkeyethenoo	Manassas	Nasri

2010-2001
2010
Dandy Boy	Mabait	Marajaa
2009
Swift Gift	Nezami	Dhaular Dhar
2008
Zaahid	Al Khaleej	King Of Dixie
2007
Wise Dennis	Skhilling Spirit	Fullandby
2006
Partners In Jazz	Marching Song	Prince Of Thebes
2005
Iffraaj	Moayed	Suggestive
2004
Mine	Greenslades	Vortex
2003
Camp Commander	Selective	Taranaki
2002
Scotty's Future	Lincoln Dancer	Nose The Trade

2000-1991
2000
Bold King	Hornbeam	Caribbean Monarch
1999
Great News	Gift Of Gold	Therhea
1997
Tregaron	World Premier	Waypoint
1996
Yeast	Master Charter	Prince Babar
1995
Jawaal	Royal Hill	Top Banana
1994
Face North	No Extras	Duckey Fuzz
1993
Tender Moment	Kayvee	Indian Slave
1992
Band On The Run	High Low	Mango Manila
1991
Sky Cloud	Band On The Run	Nicholas

1990-1988
1990
Lomax	Profit A Prendre	Just Jennings
1989
Top Dream	Compleat	Winking Winner
1988
Wing Park	Captain Holly	Barclay Street

The Victoria Cup is a flat handicap horse race in Great Britain open to horses aged four years or older. It is run over a distance of 7 furlongs (1,408 metres) at Ascot in May.

The Victoria Cup was first run over 2 miles at Hurst Park in 1901, becoming a 7 furlong handicap race from 1908. It was run at Hurst Park until the course closed in 1962 and was transferred to Ascot from the 1963 running, where it has been run ever since apart from two races at Newbury in 1964 and 1977.

== Winners since 1908 ==
- Weights given in stones and pounds.

Year	Winner	Age	Weight	Jockey	Trainer	Time
1908	Llangwm	3	7-02	Charles Heckford	Frank Hartigan	1:30.20
1909	Sir Archibald	4	8-06	William Saxby	Atty Persse
1910	Senseless	5	7-04	Joe Plant	Joe Butters	1:26.80
1911	Spanish Prince	4	8-00	Frank Wootton	Charles Morton
1912	Whisk Broom	5	9-02	Danny Maher	Jack Joyner
1913	Aldegond	3	7-10	Edwin Piper	James Bell	1:29.40
1914	Jameson	4	7-04	Nathan Spear	Willie Jarvis	1:23.40
1915	Volta	3	7-09	Steve Donoghue	Richard Dawson
1916-18	no race
1919	Carados	4	7-11	Charlie Foy	Samuel Pickering	1:27.60
1920	Paragua	4	7-09	Fred Slade	Sam Darling	1:28.60
1921	Meeting Abandoned due to a National Coal Strike
1922	Yellow Dwarf	4	7-10	George Smith	Atty Persse	1:26.80
1923	Top Gallant	3	7-13	Ted Gardner	Harry Sadler	1:24.60
1924	Jarvie	4	7-09	Charlie Smirke	James Batho	1:28.00
1925	Creolian	4	6-09	Jack Sirett	Colledge Leader	1:26.00
1926	Phalaros	4	8-03	Tommy Weston	George Lambton	1:22.60
1927	Herbalist	4	7-03	Tommy Weston	Frank Butters
1928	Fohanaun	5	8-10	Fred Winter Sr.	Walter Earl	1:21.80
1929	Royal Minstrel	4	8-08	Joe Childs	Cecil Boyd-Rochfort	1:26.80
1930	Ecilath	4	7-04	Jack Sirett	B Davis	1:27.60
1931	Fleeting Memory	6	8-07	Richard Perryman	Walter Earl	1:25.80
1932	Knight Error	6	7-11	Freddie Fox	Percy Whitaker	1:28.00
1933	Fonab	4	8-01	Gordon Richards	Fred Darling	1:26.80
1934	Alluvial	6	8-08	Bernard Carslake	Charles Peck	1:28.60
1935	Precious Pearl	4	7-05	Johnny Dines	George Lambton	1:26.80
1936	Hairan	4	8-12	Charlie Smirke	Frank Butters	1:28.00
1937	Fair Play	4	7-08	Peter Maher	Percy Allden	1:28.00
1938	Phakos	4	8-08	Eph Smith	Jack Jarvis	1:24.80
1939	Unbreakable	4	9-02	Rufus Beasley	Cecil Boyd-Rochfort	1:28.00
1940	Time Step	4	8-04	Robert Ruttle	Jack Anthony	1:30.40
1941-45	no race
1946	Honeyway	5	9-07	Eph Smith	Jack Jarvis	1:25.60
1947	Fairey Fulmar	4	8-07	Tommy Gosling	Ossie Bell	1:28.20
1948	Petition	4	9-03	Ken Gethin	Frank Butters	1:23.00
1949	My Babu	4	9-07	Charlie Smirke	Sam Armstrong	1:28.00
1950	Star Signal	5	8-00	Percy Evans	Gordon Johnson Houghton	1:24.00
1951	Fastnet Rock	4	8-02	Manny Mercer	Jack Jarvis	1:27.00
1952	Star Signal	7	7-09	Percy Evans	Richard Poole	1:25.60
1953	Orgoglio	4	8-07	Ken Gethin	Charles Elsey	1:24.20
1954	Chivalry	5	7-09	Dominic Forte	Tom Timell	1:25.80
1955	Alf's Caprice	4	7-09	Doug Smith	Harold Wallington	1:27.00
1956	Coronation Year	5	8-09	Ken Gethin	Arthur Thomas	1:24.80
1957	Dionisio	4	8-03	Eddie Hide	Charles Elsey	1:29.20
1958	Red Letter	4	8-05	Geoff Lewis	William Smyth	1:27.80
1959 (dh)	Alf's Caprice; D.T.J.	8; 5	7-13; 7-09	Eddie Cracknell; Willie Snaith	Harold Wallington; Wilfred Lyde	1:30.20
1960	Sanctum	4	8-04	Scobie Breasley	Monty Smyth	1:25.40
1961	Bass Rock	4	7-12	Peter Robinson	Jack Jarvis	1:26.00
1962	Spaniards Close	5	9-03	Doug Smith	Fred Winter Sr.	1:25.20
1963	Tudor Treasure	5	9-00	Dennis Leah	Eric Cousins	1:37.37
1964 (Note: The 1964 running took place at Newbury)	Blazing Scent	5	7-11	Ron Hutchinson	George Todd	1:31.00
1965	Princelone	4	9-07	Duncan Keith	Walter Nightingall	1:32.25
1966	Enrico	4	9-10	Lester Piggott	Jimmy Thompson	1:31.46
1967	Hadrian	4	7-11	Tony Murray	Walter Nightingall	1:34.06
1968	Rome	4	8-06	Brian Taylor	Ken Cundell	1:28.72
1969	Town Crier	4	8-10	Duncan Keith	Peter Walwyn	1:28.68
1970 (Note: The 1970 running took place at Newmarket)	Welsh Pageant	4	9-06	Sandy Barclay	Noel Murless	1:26.82
1971	Mon Plaisir	4	9-08	Geoff Lewis	Harold Wallington	1:34.17
1972	Heave To	4	7-13	Ray Still	Sir Mark Prescott	1:30.63
1973	Royal Prerogative	4	8-07	Willie Carson	Denys Smith	1:28.30
1974	Galiano	5	8-08	Willie Carson	Barry Hills	1:29.87
1975	Rhodomantade	4	8-03	Geoff Baxter	Peter Makin	1:36.92
1976	Record Token	4	9-04	Pat Eddery	Peter Walwyn	1:31.38
1977 (Note: The 1977 running took place at Newbury)	Duke Ellington	4	9-01	Brian Taylor	Ryan Price	1:32.49
1978	Private Line	5	8-13	Eddie Hide	Clive Brittain	1:41.79
1979	The Adrianstan	4	8-06	Joe Mercer	John Sutcliffe	1:38.09
1980	Kampala	4	9-03	Pat Eddery	Peter Walwyn	1:26.70
1981	Columnist	4	9-13	Pat Eddery	Jeremy Tree	1:35.73
1982	Indian King	4	9-03	Greville Starkey	Guy Harwood	1:28.08
1983	Abandoned due to waterlogging
1984	Mummys Pleasure	5	8-09	Bruce Raymond	Pat Haslam	1:27.04
1985	Tremblant	4	8-05	Willie Carson	Ron Smyth	1:28.90
1986	Ready Wit	5	7-13	Dennis McKay	Richard Hannon Sr.	1:34.98
1987	Fusilier	5	7-09	Allan Mackay	Clive Brittain	1:28.13
1988	Wing Park	4	9-01	Pat Eddery	Chris Wall	1:28.06
1989	Top Dream	4	9-01	Walter Swinburn	Michael Jarvis	1:32.19
1990	Lomax	4	9-03	Pat Eddery	Guy Harwood	1:26.83
1991	Sky Cloud	5	7-11	Willie Carson	Reg Akehurst	1:30.88
1992	Band On The Run	5	9-00	Richard Quinn	Bryan McMahon	1:32.01
1993	Tender Moment	5	7-07	Brett Doyle	Clive Brittain	1:28.21
1994	Face North	6	8-01	Alan Munro	Reg Akehurst	1:29.49
1995	Jawaal	5	8-06	John Reid	Lady Herries	1:27.03
1996	Yeast	4	8-09	Ray Cochrane	William Haggas	1:27.86
1997	Tregaron	6	8-13	Richard Quinn	Reg Akehurst	1:28.33
1998	Abandoned due to waterlogging
1999	Great News	4	8-03	Adrian Nicholls	Ian Balding	1:27.70
2000	Bold King	5	8-09	Michael Hills	John Hills	1:31.09
2001	Abandoned due to waterlogging
2002	Scotty's Future	4	8-11	Ian Mongan	David Nicholls	1:30.42
2003	Camp Commander	4	8-10	Frankie Dettori	Clive Brittain	1:29.62
2004	Mine	6	9-07	Richard Quinn	James Bethell	1:26.70
2005 (Note: The 2005 running took place at Lingfield Park)	Iffraaj	4	8-07	Philip Robinson	Michael Jarvis	1:22.97
2006	Partners In Jazz	5	9-01	Ryan Moore	David Barron	1:28.11
2007	Wise Dennis	5	8-12	Hugh Bowman	Alan Jarvis	1:29.55
2008	Zaahid	4	8-11	Richard Hills	Barry Hills	1:26.08
2009	Swift Gift	4	8-05	Martin Dwyer	Brian Meehan	1:29.09
2010	Dandy Boy	4	8-13	Colm O'Donoghue	David Marnane	1:26.73
2011	Hawkeyethenoo	5	8-10	Gary Bartley	Jim Goldie	1:26.49
2012	Global Village	7	8-05	Tadgh O'Shea	Brian Ellison	1:30.30
2013	Excellent Guest	6	8-10	Tom Queally	George Margarson	1:28.26
2014	Gabriel's Lad	5	9-08	George Baker	Denis Coakley	1:29.78
2015	Speculative Bid	4	8-09	Jamie Spencer	David Elsworth	1:26.46
2016	Flash Fire	4	9-06	Adam Kirby	Charlie Appleby	1:25.35
2017	Fastnet Tempest	4	8-05	Josephine Gordon	William Haggas	1:27.14
2018	Ripp Orf	4	8-01	Hayley Turner	David Elsworth	1:25.40
2019	Cape Byron	5	9-03	Andrea Atzeni	Roger Varian	1:27.35
	no race 2020 (Note: The 2020 running was cancelled because of the COVID-19 pandemic in the United Kingdom)
2021	River Nymph	4	9-00	Adam Kirby	Clive Cox	1:30.95
2022	Vafortino	4	8-07	Benoit de la Sayette	Kevin Philippart De Foy	1:27.18
2023	Rebel Territory	5	9-01	Jim Crowley	Amanda Perrett	1:30.53
2024	The Wizard Of Eye	5	9–02	Tom Marquand	Charlie Fellowes	1:26.58
2025	Hickory	7	8–04	Saffie Osborne	Jamie Osborne	1:23.66
2026	The Wizard Of Eye	7	9-08	Neil Callan	Tom Clover	1:24:81

== See also ==
- Horse racing in Great Britain
- List of British flat horse races
