= British flat racing Champion Apprentice =

Annual British jockey award

The flat racing Champion Jockey and Champion Apprentice titles are awarded annually to the jockey(s) and apprentice(s) respectively that have ridden the most winners (both turf and all-weather) in Great Britain during a set period or championship season. The set period has varied over time, originally covering the calendar year when all flat racing was held on turf between March and November. Later, all-weather races outside the turf season were excluded, and from 2015 the championship season was further shortened to exclude the start and end of the turf season.

The list below shows the Champion Apprentice and the number of winners for each championship season since 1922.

Following the changes in 2015, the Champion Apprentice is awarded a prize of £5,000.

- 1922 - R. A. Jones - 58
- 1923 - Charlie Elliott - 89
- 1924 - Charlie Elliott - 106
- 1925 - Charlie Smirke - 70
- 1926 - Charlie Smirke - 71
- 1927 - Sam Wragg - 38
- 1928 - G. Baines / L. Cordell - 33
- 1929 - C. Adley - 35
- 1930 - J. Simpson - 28
- 1931 - Fred Rickaby - 44
- 1932 - Fred Rickaby - 37
- 1933 - Eph Smith - 52
- 1934 - Eph Smith - 36
- 1935 - Eph Smith - 76
- 1936 - W. Wing - 37
- 1937 - Doug Smith - 45
- 1938 - G. Wells - 27
- 1939 - K. Mullins - 29
- 1940 - Geoff Littlewood - 13
- 1941 - K. Mullins - 9
- 1942 - K. Mullins - 7
- 1943 - Joe Sime - 5
- 1944 - Joe Sime - 9
- 1945 - Durr / Gosling - 10
- 1946 - Joe Sime - 40
- 1947 - Dennis Buckle - 20
- 1948 - Dennis Buckle - 25
- 1949 - Willie Snaith - 31
- 1950 - Lester Piggott - 52
- 1951 - Lester Piggott - 51
- 1952 - Joe Mercer - 26
- 1953 - Joe Mercer - 61
- 1954 - Edward Hide - 53
- 1955 - Peter Robinson - 46
- 1956 - Edward Hide - 75
- 1957 - Greville Starkey - 45
- 1958 - Peter Boothman - 37
- 1959 - Bobby Elliott - 27
- 1960 - Bobby Elliott - 39
- 1961 - Brian Lee - 52
- 1962 - Bruce Raymond - 13
- 1963 - David Yates - 24
- 1964 - Paul Cook - 46
- 1965 - Paul Cook - 62
- 1966 - Sandy Barclay - 71
- 1967 - Ernie Johnson - 39
- 1968 - Coates / Dicey - 40
- 1969 - Clive Eccleston - 41
- 1970 - Philip Waldron - 59
- 1971 - Pat Eddery - 71
- 1972 - Robert Edmondson - 45
- 1973 - Steve Perks - 41
- 1974 - Alan Bond - 40
- 1975 - Alan Bond - 66
- 1976 - David Dineley - 54
- 1977 - Jimmy Bleasdale - 67
- 1978 - Kevin Darley - 70
- 1979 - Philip Robinson - 51
- 1980 - Philip Robinson - 59
- 1981 - Bryn Crossley - 45
- 1982 - Billy Newnes - 57
- 1983 - Michael Hills - 39
- 1984 - Richard Quinn - 62
- 1985 - Carter / Ryan - 37
- 1986 - Gary Carter - 34
- 1987 - Gary Bardwell - 27
- 1988 - Gary Bardwell - 39
- 1989 - Frankie Dettori - 71
- 1990 - Jimmy Fortune - 46
- 1991 - Darryll Holland - 79
- 1992 - David Harrison - 56
- 1993 - Jason Weaver - 60
- 1994 - Stephen Davies - 45
- 1995 - Seb Sanders - 61
- 1996 - Dane O'Neill - 79
- 1997 - Royston Ffrench - 77
- 1998 - Carl Lowther - 72
- 1999 - Neil Callan - 49
- 2000 - Lee Newman - 87
- 2001 - Chris Catlin - 71
- 2002 - Paul Hanagan - 81
- 2003 - Ryan Moore - 52
- 2004 - Tom Queally - 59
- 2005 - Golam / Turner - 44
- 2006 - Stevie Donohoe - 44
- 2007 - Greg Fairley - 65
- 2008 - Buick / Probert - 50
- 2009 - Frederik Tylicki - 60
- 2010 - Martin Lane - 41
- 2011 - Martin Harley - 57
- 2012 - Amy Ryan - 40
- 2013 - Jason Hart - 51
- 2014 - Oisin Murphy - 76
- 2015 - Tom Marquand - 54
- 2016 - Josephine Gordon - 50
- 2017 - David Egan
- 2018 - Jason Watson
- 2019 - Cieren Fallon
- 2020 - Cieren Fallon
- 2021 - Marco Ghiani
- 2022 - Benoit de la Sayette
- 2023 - Billy Loughnane - 60
- 2024 - Sean D. Bowen - 44
- 2025 - Joe Leavy - 41
- 2026 - Jack Callan

== See also ==
- British flat racing Champion Jockey
- British flat racing Champion Trainer
- British flat racing Champion Owner
- Leading sire in Great Britain & Ireland
