= Lester Award =

A Lester Award is one of a range of awards given to jockeys at an annual ceremony in Great Britain. The awards are named in honour of Lester Piggott, an eleven-time British flat racing Champion Jockey who won thirty British Classic Races from 1954 to 1992. The awards were inaugurated in 1990, and they recognise the achievements of jockeys from both flat and jump racing during the previous year.

The ceremony to present the 2012 awards took place at the Hilton Birmingham Metropole Hotel, Birmingham, on 28 March 2013. The event was sponsored by Stobart. The awards ceremony had traditionally been held the night before Good Friday, a day with no racing in Great Britain, but the start of Good Friday racing in 2014 led to the event being moved to a December date, with the 2014 ceremony honouring jockeys for their achievements in 2013 and 2014. Since 2018 the awards have been presented in a Sky Sports Racing broadcast and not at a live ceremony.

== Flat Jockey of the Year ==
- 1990: Pat Eddery
- 1991: Pat Eddery
- 1992: Michael Roberts
- 1993: Frankie Dettori
- 1994: Frankie Dettori
- 1995: Frankie Dettori
- 1996: Pat Eddery / Frankie Dettori (tied)
- 1997: Kieren Fallon
- 1998: Kieren Fallon
- 1999: Kieren Fallon
- 2000: Kevin Darley
- 2001: Kieren Fallon
- 2002: Kieren Fallon
- 2003: Kieren Fallon
- 2004: Frankie Dettori
- 2005: Jamie Spencer
- 2006: Ryan Moore
- 2007: Jamie Spencer
- 2008: Ryan Moore
- 2009: Ryan Moore
- 2010: Paul Hanagan
- 2011: Paul Hanagan
- 2012: Richard Hughes
- 2013: Richard Hughes
- 2014: Ryan Moore
- 2015: Silvestre de Sousa
- 2016: Jim Crowley
- 2017:
- 2018: Oisin Murphy
- 2019: Oisin Murphy
- 2020: Hollie Doyle
- 2021: William Buick
- 2022: William Buick
- 2023: William Buick

== Jump Jockey of the Year ==
- 1990: Richard Dunwoody
- 1991: Peter Niven
- 1992: Richard Dunwoody
- 1993: Richard Dunwoody
- 1994: Richard Dunwoody
- 1995: Richard Dunwoody
- 1996: Tony McCoy
- 1997: Tony McCoy
- 1998: Tony McCoy
- 1999: Tony McCoy
- 2000: Tony McCoy
- 2001: Tony McCoy
- 2002: Tony McCoy
- 2003: Tony McCoy
- 2004: Tony McCoy
- 2005: Timmy Murphy
- 2006: Tony McCoy
- 2007: Tony McCoy
- 2008: Tony McCoy
- 2009: Tony McCoy
- 2010: Tony McCoy
- 2011: Tony McCoy
- 2012: Tony McCoy
- 2013: Tony McCoy
- 2014: Tony McCoy
- 2015: Tony McCoy
- 2016: Richard Johnson
- 2017:
- 2018: Richard Johnson
- 2019: Richard Johnson
- 2020: Brian Hughes
- 2021: Harry Skelton
- 2022: Brian Hughes
- 2023: Brian Hughes

== Apprentice Jockey of the Year ==
- 1990: Jimmy Fortune
- 1991: Darryll Holland
- 1992: David Harrison
- 1993: Jason Weaver
- 1994: Michael Fenton
- 1995: Seb Sanders
- 1996: Dane O'Neill
- 1997: Royston Ffrench
- 1998: Neil Pollard
- 1999: Robert Winston
- 2000: Lee Newman
- 2001: Keith Dalgleish
- 2002: Paul Hanagan
- 2003: Ryan Moore
- 2004: Tom Queally
- 2005: Hayley Turner
- 2006: Stephen Donohoe
- 2007: William Buick
- 2008: William Buick
- 2009: Frederik Tylicki
- 2010: Martin Lane
- 2011: Martin Harley
- 2012: Amy Ryan
- 2013:
- 2014:
- 2015: Tom Marquand
- 2016: Josephine Gordon
- 2017:
- 2018: Jason Watson
- 2019: Cieren Fallon
- 2020: Cieren Fallon
- 2021: Marco Ghiani
- 2022: Benoit de la Sayette
- 2023: Billy Loughnane

== Conditional Jockey of the Year ==
- 1990: Derek Byrne
- 1991: Adrian Maguire
- 1992: Mick Fitzgerald
- 1993: Warren Marston
- 1994: Tony Dobbin
- 1995: Tony McCoy
- 1996: Richard Johnson
- 1997: Barry Fenton
- 1998: Robert Thornton
- 1999: Joe Tizzard
- 2000: Noel Fehily
- 2001: Liam Cooper
- 2002: Marcus Foley
- 2003: Marcus Foley
- 2004: Jamie Moore
- 2005: Paddy Brennan
- 2006: William Kennedy
- 2007: Tom O'Brien
- 2008: Brian Hughes
- 2009: Aidan Coleman
- 2010: Rhys Flint
- 2011: Sam Twiston-Davies
- 2012: Henry Brooke
- 2013:
- 2014:
- 2015: Sean Bowen
- 2016: Craig Nichol
- 2017:
- 2018: James Bowen
- 2019: Jonjo O'Neill jnr
- 2020: Jonjo O'Neill jnr
- 2021: Danny McMenamin
- 2022: Kevin Brogan
- 2023: Luca Morgan

== Female Jockey of the Year ==
- 1990: Alex Greaves
- 1991: Alex Greaves
- 1992: Emma O'Gorman
- 1993: Diane Clay
- 1994: Diane Clay
- 1995: Alex Greaves
- 1996: Sophie Mitchell
- 1997: Alex Greaves
- 1998: Alex Greaves
- 1999: Sophie Mitchell
- 2000: Joanna Badger
- 2001: Joanna Badger
- 2002: Joanna Badger
- 2003: Lisa Jones
- 2004: Hayley Turner
- 2005: Hayley Turner
- 2006: Hayley Turner
- 2007: Hayley Turner
- 2008: Hayley Turner
- 2009: Hayley Turner
- 2010: Cathy Gannon
- 2011 Cathy Gannon
- 2012: Lucy Alexander
- 2013:
- 2014:
- 2015: Cathy Gannon
- 2016: Josephine Gordon
- 2017:
- 2018: Nicola Currie
- 2019: Hollie Doyle
- 2020: Hollie Doyle
- 2021: Hollie Doyle

== Jockey of the Year ==
- 1990: Pat Eddery
- 1991: Alan Munro
- 1992: Michael Roberts
- 1993: Adrian Maguire
- 1994: Frankie Dettori
- 1995: Frankie Dettori
- 1996: Frankie Dettori
- 1997: Tony McCoy
  - discontinued after 1997

== Honorary Lester ==
- 1996: Peter O'Sullevan
- 1997: Willie Carson
- 2000: Jim Foster (JAGB Treasurer for 30 years)
- 2001: Michael Caulfield (JAGB Chief Executive)
- 2016: Anne Saunders (Professional Jockeys Association director)

== Lifetime achievement award ==
- 2008: Mick Fitzgerald

== Lester Piggott Honorary Award ==
- 2022: Luke Morris

== Chief Executive Award ==
- 2007: Reg Hollinshead

== PJA Directors Award ==
- 2008: Tony Dobbin

== International Jockey of the Year ==
- 2007: Ruby Walsh
- 2008: Ruby Walsh
- 2009: Michael Kinane
- 2010: Ruby Walsh

== Flat Ride of the Year ==
- 1998: Darryll Holland on Double Trigger in the Goodwood Cup, 30 July.
- 1999: Francis Norton on She's Our Mare in the Cambridgeshire Handicap, 2 October.
- 2000: Gary Bardwell on Bangalore in the Chester Cup, 10 May.
- 2001: Steve Drowne on Harmonic Way in the Cork and Orrery Stakes, 21 June.
- 2002: Darryll Holland on Just James at Newmarket, 25 May.
- 2003: Martin Dwyer on Persian Punch in the Jockey Club Cup, 18 October.
- 2004: Paul Mulrennan on Blue Spinnaker in the Zetland Gold Cup, 31 May.
- 2005: Tony Culhane on Toss the Caber at Musselburgh, 4 July.
- 2006: Martin Dwyer on Sir Percy in the Epsom Derby, 3 June.
- 2007: Paul Hanagan on Fonthill Road at York, 13 October.
- 2008: Jim Crowley on Bulwark in the Chester Cup, 7 May.
- 2009: Tom Queally on Midday in the Breeders' Cup Filly & Mare Turf, 6 November.
- 2010: Paul Hanagan on Opening Nite at Ayr, 17 September.
- 2011: Paul Hanagan on Barefoot Lady in the Nell Gwyn Stakes, 13 April
- 2012: Michael O'Connell on Qubuh at Hamilton Park, 6 May
- 2013:
- 2014:
- 2015: David Nolan on Rex Imperator at Doncaster, 10 September
- 2016: Robert Winston on Librisa Breeze at Ascot, 1 October
- 2017:
- 2018: Eoin Walsh on Storm Lightning at Wolverhampton, 22 September
- 2019: Paul Hanagan on Dutch Decoy at Hamilton Park, 30 August
- 2020: Dylan Hogan on Wanaash at Wolverhampton, 15 January
- 2021: Ray Dawson on Marshall Dan at Sandown Park, 10 September
- 2022: Jonny Peate on Rocket Rod at Newcastle, 23 June
- 2023 : Tom Marquand on Desert Hero in the King George V Stakes, 22 June

== Jump Ride of the Year ==
- 1998: Brian Harding on One Man in the Queen Mother Champion Chase, 18 March.
- 1999: Richard Johnson on Anzum in the Stayers' Hurdle, 18 March.
- 2000: Tony Dobbin on Master Tern in the Vincent O'Brien County Hurdle, 16 March.
- 2001: Richard Guest on Red Marauder in the Grand National, 7 April.
- 2002: Rodi Greene on Jurancon II at Uttoxeter, 21 December.
- 2003: Andrew Thornton on Kingscliff at Ascot, 22 November.
- 2004: Timmy Murphy on Stormez in the Servo Computer Services Trophy, 13 November.
- 2005: Matty Batchelor on King Harald in the Jewson Novices' Handicap Chase, 17 March.
- 2006: Henry Oliver on Sissinghurst Storm at Chepstow, 18 April.
- 2007: Andrew Thornton on Miko de Beauchene in the Welsh National, 27 December.
- 2008: Robert Thornton on Nenuphar Collonges in the Albert Bartlett Novices' Hurdle, 14 March.
- 2009: Tony McCoy on Wichita Lineman in the William Hill Trophy, 10 March.
- 2010: Matt Crawley on Lastroseofsummer at Musselburgh, 19 November.
- 2011: Maurice Linehan on Tarvini at Huntingdon
- 2012: Tony McCoy on Synchronised in the Cheltenham Gold Cup, 16 March
- 2013:
- 2014:
- 2015: Sean Bowen on Just A Par in the Bet365 Gold Cup, 25 April
- 2016: Colm McCormack on Fiddler's Flight at Sedgefield, 9 February
- 2017:
- 2018: James Bowen on Raz De Maree in the Welsh Grand National, 6 January
- 2019: Matty Bachelor on Noble Glance at Fontwell, 22 August
- 2020: Jack Tudor on Potters Corner in the Welsh Grand National, 27 December 2019
- 2021: Sean Quinlan on For Jim at Hexham, 9 October
- 2022: Paddy Brennan on Knight Salute at Aintree, 7 April
- 2023: Derek Fox on Corach Rambler in the Ultima Handicap Chase, 14 March

== Flat Jockey Special Recognition Award ==
- 1996: Jimmy Quinn
- 1997: Kevin Darley
- 1998: George Duffield
- 1999: George Duffield
- 2000: Ray Cochrane
- 2001: George Duffield
- 2002: Pat Eddery
- 2003: Pat Eddery
- 2004: Willie Ryan
- 2005: John Carroll
- 2006: Richard Quinn
- 2007: Kevin Darley
- 2008: Dale Gibson
- 2009: Dale Gibson
- 2010: Paul Hanagan
- 2011: Philip Robinson
- 2012: Michael Hills
- 2013:
- 2014:
- 2015: Jack Berry
- 2016: Tom O'Ryan
- 2017:
- 2018: George Baker
- 2019: Pat Smullen
- 2020: Hollie Doyle
- 2021: Joe Fanning
- 2022: Paul Mulrennan
- 2023: Paul Hanagan

== Jump Jockey Special Recognition Award ==
- 1996: Andrew Thornton
- 1997: Andrew Thornton
- 1998: Simon McNeill
- 1999: Gary Lyons
- 2000: Peter Niven
- 2001: Willie Worthington
- 2002: Brian Storey
- 2003: Norman Williamson
- 2004: Vince Slattery
- 2005: Jim Culloty
- 2006: J. P. McNamara
- 2007: Russ Garritty
- 2008: Brian Harding
- 2009: Jimmy McCarthy
- 2010: Warren Marston
- 2011: Anna O'Brien, physiotherapist
- 2012: Campbell Gillies
- 2013:
- 2014:
- 2015: Tony McCoy
- 2016: Tom O'Ryan
- 2017:
- 2018: Andrew Thornton
- 2019: Noel Fehily
- 2020: Leighton Aspell
- 2021: Richard Johnson
- 2022: Josh Moore
- 2023: Alan Johns
