= Peleid =

British-bred Thoroughbred racehorse

- Sire: Derring-Do
- Grandsire: Darius
- Dam: Winning Bid
- Damsire: Great Captain
- Sex: Stallion
- Foaled: 31 March 1970
- Country: United Kingdom
- Colour: bay
- Breeder: Col. W E "Billy" Behrens
- Owner: Billy Behrens
- Trainer: Bill Elsey

Major wins
- Zetland Gold Cup (1973); John Smith's Magnet Cup (1973); St Leger Stakes (1973); Great Breeders' Prize (Hungary) (1974))

Peleid (foaled 1970) was a British Thoroughbred racehorse and sire best known for winning the classic St Leger Stakes in 1973. After showing little promise in his early career he ran well in several important handicap races in 1973 before stepping up in class to record a 28/1 upset victory in the St Leger on 15 September. He was later sold and exported to stand as a breeding stallion in Hungary.

== Background ==
Peleid was a bay horse bred by his owner Colonel William E. Behrens. He was from the fourth crop of foals sired by Derring-Do, a horse whose wins included the Queen Elizabeth II Stakes in 1965 and whose other offspring included the 2000 Guineas winners High Top and Roland Gardens. Peleid's dam, Winning Bid, was a successful broodmare who also produced the Eclipse Stakes winner Coup de Feu. The colt was trained by Bill Elsey at his Highfield stables in Malton, North Yorkshire.

== Racing career ==
=== 1972: two-year-old season ===
Peleid was not campaigned in the highest class, and won only once, when taking a maiden race at York Racecourse in July.

=== 1973: three-year-old season ===
As a three-year-old Peleid was mainly campaigned in handicap races and made steady progress. After winning over one mile at Liverpool on Grand National day in March he won the valuable Zetland Gold Cup over ten furlongs at Redcar Racecourse in May. In June he was sent to Royal Ascot where he finished second to Zab in the King George V Stakes. In July he won the John Smith's Magnet Cup at York and was then sent to France where he finished second in the Prix de la Ville de Trouville. In August he returned to York for the Ebor Handicap over one and three quarter miles. Carrying a weight of 114 pounds he finished fourth to Bonne Noel.

In September Peleid was one of thirteen three-year-olds to contest the St Leger Stakes at Doncaster Racecourse. Ridden by the 47-year-old veteran Frankie Durr, he was not regarded as a serious contender, and started at odds of 28/1. It was believed that Peleid had raced too prominently in the early stages of the Ebor, and on this occasion Durr restrained the colt in the early stages before making his challenge in the straight. He took the lead inside the last quarter mile and accelerated clear of the field to win by two and a half lengths and a neck from Buoy and Duke of Ragusa. He was the first winner of the race trained in the North of England since the filly Cantelo, trained by Elsey's father Charles Elsey won in 1959.

=== 1974: four-year-old season ===
Peleid remained in training as a four-year-old but failed to win a race in Britain: he did finish second in the John Porter Stakes and third in the Jockey Club Stakes. In the autumn he was sold and exported to Hungary. He won the Great Breeders' Prize in his new country before being retired to stud.

== Assessment ==
In their book A Century of Champions, John Randall and Tony Morris rated Peleid a "poor" St Leger winner.

== Pedigree ==
Pedigree of Peleid (GB), bay stallion, 1970
Sire Derring-Do (GB) 1961	Darius (GB); 1951	Dante	Nearco
Sire Derring-Do (GB) 1961	Darius (GB); 1951	Dante	Rosy Legend
Sire Derring-Do (GB) 1961	Darius (GB); 1951	Yasna	Dastur
Sire Derring-Do (GB) 1961	Darius (GB); 1951	Yasna	Ariadne
Sire Derring-Do (GB) 1961	Sipsey Bridge (GB); 1954	Abernant	Owen Tudor
Sire Derring-Do (GB) 1961	Sipsey Bridge (GB); 1954	Abernant	Rustom Mahal
Sire Derring-Do (GB) 1961	Sipsey Bridge (GB); 1954	Claudette	Chanteur
Sire Derring-Do (GB) 1961	Sipsey Bridge (GB); 1954	Claudette	Nearly
Dam Winning Bid (GB) 1958	Great Captain (USA); 1949	War Admiral	Man o' War
Dam Winning Bid (GB) 1958	Great Captain (USA); 1949	War Admiral	Brushup
Dam Winning Bid (GB) 1958	Great Captain (USA); 1949	Big Hurry	Black Toney
Dam Winning Bid (GB) 1958	Great Captain (USA); 1949	Big Hurry	La Troienne
Dam Winning Bid (GB) 1958	Straight Bid (GB); 1954	Solonaway	Solferino
Dam Winning Bid (GB) 1958	Straight Bid (GB); 1954	Solonaway	Anyway
Dam Winning Bid (GB) 1958	Straight Bid (GB); 1954	Straight Bid	Straight Deal
Dam Winning Bid (GB) 1958	Straight Bid (GB); 1954	Straight Bid	Olifa (Family 21-a)
