= Cambridgeshire Handicap =

Flat horse race in Britain

- Class: Handicap
- Location: Rowley Mile; Newmarket, England
- Inaugurated: 1839
- Race type: Flat / Thoroughbred
- Sponsor: Bet365
- Website: Newmarket

Race information
- Distance: 1m 1f (1,811 metres)
- Surface: Turf
- Track: Straight
- Qualification: Three-years-old and up
- Weight: Handicap
- Purse: £175,000 (2025); 1st: £90,195

Cambridgeshire Handicap
2026
Pierre Royal	Crest of Fire	Altareq

Previous years
2025
Boiling Point	Indalo	Fort George
2024
Liberty Lane	James McHenry	Toimy Son
2023
Astro King	Greek Order	Bopedro
2022
Majestic	Bell Rock	Dual Identity
2021
Bedouin's Story	Anmaat	Ametist

2020-2011
2020
Majestic Dawn	Lucander	Bell Rock
2019
Lord North	Beringer	Good Birthday
2018
Wissahickon	Mordin	Via Via
2017
Dolphin Vista	Sands Chorus	Cote d'Azur
2016
Spark Plug	Carry On Deryck	Very Talented
2015
Third Time Lucky	Master The World	Examiner
2014
Bronze Angel	Niceofyoutotellme	Velox
2013
Educate	Code Of Honor	Tres Coronas
2012
Bronze Angel	Mull Of Killough	Boom And Bust
2011
Prince Of Johanne	Stevie Thunder	Proponent

2010-2001
2010
Credit Swap	Steele Tango	Pires
2009
Supaseus	Tartan Gigha	Nanton
2008
Tazeez	Nanton	Swop
2007
Pipedreamer	Docofthebay	Teslin
2006
Formal Decree	Blue Bajan	Pinpoint
2005
Blue Monday	Evaluator	My Paris
2004
Spanish Don	Take A Bow	Fine Silver
2003
Chivalry	Adiemus	Checkit
2002
Beauchamp Pilot	Far Lane	Goblet Of Fire
2001
I Cried For You	Halland	Duck Row

2000-1991
2000
Katy Nowaitee	Nooshman	Pinchincha
1999
She's Our Mare	Bomb Alaska	Shadoof
1998
Lear Spear	Consort	Pantar
1997
Pasternak	Rudimental	Hunters Of Brora
1996
Clifton Fox	Missile	Angus-G
1995
Cap Juluca	Ball Gown	Hunters Of Brora
1994
Halling	Hunters Of Brora	Mr Confusion
1993
Penny Drops	Talent	Rambo's Hall
1992
Rambo's Hall	Montpelier Boy	Double Entendre
1991
Mellottie	High Premium	Vague Dancer

1990-1988
1990
Risen Moon	Mellottie	Line Of Vision
1989
Rambo's Hall	Dawn Success	Re-Release
1988
Quinlan Terry	Ile De Chypre	Coeur De Miel

The Cambridgeshire Handicap is a flat handicap horse race in Great Britain open to horses aged three years or older. It is run on the Rowley Mile at Newmarket over a distance of 1 mile and 1 furlong (1,811 metres), and it is scheduled to take place each year in late September.

== History ==
The event was established in 1839, and the inaugural running was won by Lanercost. It was founded in the same year as another major handicap at Newmarket, the Cesarewitch. The two races came to be known as the Autumn Double.

The Cesarewitch initially took place before the Cambridgeshire, but the schedule was later reversed and the Cambridgeshire now precedes the other race by two weeks. Three horses completed the double in the 19th century — Rosebery (1876), Foxhall (1881) and Plaisanterie (1885) — but the feat has been rarely attempted since then.

The Cambridgeshire Handicap is currently held on the final day of Newmarket's three-day Cambridgeshire Meeting.

== Records ==
Most successful horse (2 wins):

- Hackler's Pride – 1903, 1904
- Christmas Daisy – 1909, 1910
- Sterope – 1948, 1949
- Prince de Galles – 1969, 1970
- Baronet – 1978, 1980
- Rambo's Hall – 1989, 1992
- Bronze Angel - 2012, 2014

Leading jockey (4 wins):

- Nat Flatman – Vulcan (1841), Evenus (1844), Alarm (1845), Scherz (1854)
- George Fordham – Little David (1853), Odd Trick (1857), See Saw (1868), Sabinus (1871)

Leading trainer (5 wins):

- John Gosden – Halling (1994), Pipedreamer (2007), Tazeez (2008), Wissahickon (2018), Lord North (2019)

(note: the trainers of some of the early winners are unknown)

== Winners since 1900 ==
- Weights given in stones and pounds.
- Separate divisions of the race indicated by (1) and (2).

Year	Winner	Age	Weight	Jockey	Trainer	SP	Time
1900	Berrill	4	7-09	John Thompson	Philip Behan	20/1	1:54.00
1901	Watershed	3	7-07	Johnny Reiff	Charles Beatty	25/1	1:58.80
1902	Ballantrae	3	6-08	John Watts Jr.	John Huggins	9/4 F	1:54.00
1903	Hackler's Pride	3			Jack Fallon
1904	Hackler's Pride	4	8-10	Bernard Dillon	Jack Fallon	7/4	1:52.80
1905	Velocity	3	6-05	Arthur Templeman	Samuel Pickering	7/2 F	2:00.40
1906	Polymelus	4	8-10	Danny Maher	Charles Peck	11/10 F	1:52.80
1907	Land League	4	7-13	Billy Higgs	Robert Sherwood Jr.	8/1	1:58.40
1908	Marcovil	5	7-11	Leslie Hewitt	Charlie Waugh	50/1
1909	Christmas Daisy	4	7-02	Charles Ringstead	Lewis	100/7	1:59.20
1910	Christmas Daisy	5	8-02	Steve Donoghue	Lewis	7/1	1:56.40
1911	Long Set	4			James Batho	33/1	1:53.40
1912	Adam Bede	4	7-12	Charlie Foy	Joe Cannon	100/7	1:55.80
1913	Cantilever	3	7-12	Herbert Southey	Colledge Leader	33/1	1:57.80
1914	Honeywood	3	7-08	Steve Donoghue	Charles Peck	100/7
1915	Silver Tag	3	8-03	Steve Donoghue	Richard Dawson	100/14 F	1:53.20
1916	Eos	3	7-06	Vic Smyth	George Lambton	10/1
1917	Brown Prince	3	7-07	Peter Jones	Reg Day	100/6	1:50.40
1918	Zinovia	3	8-07	Vic Smyth	F Hunt	9/2 F	1:58.00
1919	Brigand	5	6-10	Edgar Crickmere	Willie Pratt	25/1	1:54.20
1920	Abandoned due to a Coal Strike
1921	Milenko	3	7-01	Robert Lynch	Willie Pratt	100/7	1:51.60
1922	Re-echo	3	7-09	Albert Whalley	Colledge Leader	25/1	1:52.60
1923	Verdict	3	7-12	Michael Beary	Willie Waugh	100/7	1:52.00
1924	Twelve Pointer	4	8-12	Bernard Carslake	Atty Persse	9/1	1:56.00
1925	Masked Marvel	3	7-09	William McLachlan Jr.	Sam H Darling	100/8	1:53.60
1926	Insight II	5	7-13	Joseph Thwaites	Sam H Darling	50/1	1:56.00
1927 (dh)	Medal; Niantic	3; 4	7-04; 6-03	Joseph Caldwell; Willie Stephenson	Stanley Wootton; William Walters	20/1 F 25/1	1:53.00
1928	Pallais Royal II	3	7-13	Marcel Allemand	Emile Charlier	5/1 F	1:54.00
1929	Double Life	3	7-12	Johnny Dines	Cecil Boyd-Rochfort	20/1	1:52.00
1930	The Pen	3	7-04	Cliff Richards	Martin Hartigan	50/1	1:50.80
1931	Disarmament	3	7-11	Billy Nevett	Charles Elsey	18/1	1:49.60
1932	Pullover	3	6-11	Albert Richardson	Matthew D Peacock	100/1	1:55.20
1933	Raymond	3	8-04	George Nicoll	Joseph Lawson	33/1	1:53.00
1934	Wychwood Abbot	3	8-06	Richard Perryman	Ted Leader	9/1	1:49.60
1935	Commander III	5	7-11	Thomas Hawcroft	Basil Briscoe	28/1	1:52.00
1936	Dan Bulger	3	7-13	Tommy Weston	Harry Cottrill	7/1	1:51.60
1937	Artist's Prince	4	6-12	Albert Richardson	Johnny Dines	13/1	1:51.00
1938	Helleniqua	5	6-12	B Guimard	William Webb	50/1	1:51.80
1939 (1)	Gyroscope	3	7-07	Bob Lacey	Harvey Leader	100/6	1:42.80
1939 (2)	Orichalque	6	8-10	Jimmy Simpson	Vanda Beatty	25/1	1:43.20
1940 (Note: The 1940 running was held at Nottingham.)	Caxton	4	7-09	Percy Evans	Sam Armstrong	100/7	1:46.80
1941	Rue de la Paix	5	8-13	Tommy Carey	George Beeby	18/1	1:39.80
1942	no race
1943	Quartier-Maitre	8	8-09	Tommy Carey	Ted Leader	8/1	1:43.20
1944	Hunsingore	3	8-10	Harry Wragg	Robert Colling	6/1	1:43.20
1945	Esquire	3	6-03	Guy Packer	Robert Colling	40/1	1:54.80
1946	Sayani	3	9-04	Rae Johnstone	Joseph Lieux	25/1	1:54.20
1947	Fairey Fulmar	4	8-12	Tommy Gosling	Ossie Bell	28/1	1:54.20
1948	Sterope	3	7-04	Dennis Schofield	Rufus Beasley	25/1	1:54.40
1949	Sterope	4	9-04	Charlie Elliott	Rufus Beasley	25/1	1:53.20
1950	Kelling	3	7-10	Doug Smith	Alec Waugh	100/7	1:54.20
1951	Fleeting Moment	5	7-13	Scobie Breasley	Tommy Bartlam	28/1	1:52.60
1952	Richer	3	8-00	Ken Gethin	Staff Ingham	100/6	1:52.81
1953	Jupiter	3	8-03	Gordon Richards	Rufus Beasley	100/6	1:55.55
1954	Minstrel	3	7-00	Charlie Gaston	Jack Jarvis	66/1	1:53.14
1955	Retrial	3	7-01	Peter Robinson	Cecil Boyd-Rochfort	18/1	1:51.78
1956	Loppylugs	4	7-08	Eph Smith	John Beary	100/7	1:54.45
1957	Stephanotis	4	8-05	Harry Carr	John Rogers	100/6	1:54.40
1958	London Cry	4	9-05	Scobie Breasley	Gordon Richards	22/1	1:56.83
1959	Rexequus	3	8-07	Norman Stirk	George Boyd	25/1	1:50.86
1960	Midsummer Night	3	7-12	Duncan Keith	Peter Hastings-Bass	40/1	2:03.15
1961 (dh)	Henry The Seventh; Violetta III	3; 3	8-04; 7-08	Eddie Hide; Cliff Parkes	Bill Elsey; Harry Wragg	100/8 F 33/1	1:53.75
1962	Hidden Meaning	3	9-00	Scobie Breasley	Harvey Leader	7/1 F	1:51.32
1963	Commander In Chief	4	8-00	Frankie Durr	Eric Cousins	100/7	1:54.32
1964	Hasty Cloud	6	7-10	Jock Wilson	Harry Wallington	100/8 F	1:51.21
1965	Tarqogan	5	9-03	Bill Williamson	Seamus McGrath	100/8	1:52.04
1966	Dites	4	7-04	David Maitland	Harvey Leader	33/1	1:55.84
1967	Lacquer	3	8-06	Ron Hutchinson	Harry Wragg	20/1	1:55.33
1968	Emerilo	4	7-09	Taffy Thomas	Percy Allden	20/1	1:58.92
1969	Prince De Galles	3	7-12	Frankie Durr	Peter Robinson	5/2 F	1:51.60
1970	Prince De Galles	4	9-07	Frankie Durr	Peter Robinson	6/1	1:51.09
1971	King Midas	3	7-09	Des Cullen	Derrick Candy	10/1	1:52.57
1972	Negus	5	9-00	Philip Waldron	Derrick Candy	16/1	1:57.16
1973	Siliciana	4	8-05	Geoff Lewis	Ian Balding	14/1	1:52.69
1974	Flying Nelly	4	7-07	David Maitland	Bill Wightman	22/1	1:52.99
1975	Lottogift	4	8-02	Roger Wernham	Dave Hanley	33/1	1:51.04
1976	Intermission	3	8-06	Greville Starkey	Michael Stoute	14/1	1:55.47
1977	Sin Timon	3	8-03	Tony Kimberley	Jeremy Hindley	18/1	1:47.45
1978	Baronet	6	9-00	Brian Rouse	John Benstead	12/1	1:54.64
1979	Smartset	4	8-08	John Reid	Fulke Johnson Houghton	33/1	1:54.00
1980	Baronet	8	9-03	Brian Rouse	John Benstead	22/1	1:50.35
1981	Braughing	4	8-04	Steve Cauthen	Clive Brittain	50/1	1:52.18
1982	Century City	3	9-06	Joe Mercer	Luca Cumani	20/1	1:56.95
1983	Sagamore	4	7-08	Taffy Thomas	Frankie Durr	35/1	1:51.47
1984	Leysh	3	8-07	John Lowe	Steve Norton	33/1	1:51.48
1985	Tremblant	4	9-08	Pat Eddery	Ron Smyth	16/1	1:49.91
1986 (Note: The 1986 and 1999 editions were held on Newmarket's July Course)	Dallas	3	9-06	Ray Cochrane	Luca Cumani	10/1	1:45.94
1987	Balthus	4	8-01	Dean McKeown	Jeremy Glover	50/1	1:52.32
1988	Quinlan Terry	3	8-05	George Duffield	Sir Mark Prescott	11/1	1:51.33
1989	Rambo's Hall	4	8-06	Dean McKeown	Jeremy Glover	15/1	1:53.10
1990	Risen Moon	3	8-09	Steve Cauthen	Barry Hills	7/1 F	1:49.40
1991	Mellottie	6	9-01	John Lowe	Mary Reveley	10/1	1:49.24
1992	Rambo's Hall	7	9-03	Dean McKeown	Jeremy Glover	9/2 F	1:54.63
1993	Penny Drops	4	7-13	David Harrison	Lord Huntingdon	7/1 F	1:53.39
1994	Halling	3	8-08	Frankie Dettori	John Gosden	8/1 CF	1:52.01
1995	Cap Juluca	3	9-10	Richard Hughes	Roger Charlton	11/1	1:50.71
1996	Clifton Fox	4	8-02	Nigel Day	Jeremy Glover	14/1	1:48.54
1997	Pasternak	4	9-01	George Duffield	Sir Mark Prescott	4/1 F	1:49.43
1998	Lear Spear	3	7-13	Neil Pollard	David Elsworth	20/1	1:51.89
1999	She's Our Mare	6	7-12	Franny Norton	Tony Martin	11/1	2:08.49
2000	Katy Nowaitee	4	8-08	John Reid	Peter Harris	6/1	1:51.05
2001	I Cried for You	6	8-06	Micky Fenton	James Given	33/1	1:52.91
2002	Beauchamp Pilot	4	9-05	Eddie Ahern	Gerard Butler	9/1	1:47.28
2003	Chivalry I	4	8-01	George Duffield	Sir Mark Prescott	14/1	1:48.11
2004	Spanish Don	6	8-07	Liam Keniry	David Elsworth	100/1	1:49.80
2005	Blue Monday	4	9-03	Steve Drowne	Roger Charlton	5/1 F	1:51.49
2006	Formal Decree	3	8-09	Jamie Spencer	Alan Swinbank	9/1	1:52.79
2007	Pipedreamer	3	8-12	Jimmy Fortune	John Gosden	5/1 F	1:49.81
2008	Tazeez	4	9-02	Richard Hills	John Gosden	25/1	1:47.66
2009	Supaseus	6	9-01	Travis Block	Hughie Morrison	16/1	1:47.48
2010	Credit Swap	5	8-07	Jim Crowley	Michael Wigham	14/1	1:53.87
2011	Prince of Johanne	5	8-09	John Fahy	Tom Tate	40/1	1:49.14
2012	Bronze Angel	3	8-08	William Buick	Marcus Tregoning	9/1	1:47.73
2013	Educate I	4	9-09	Johnny Murtagh	Ismail Mohammed	8/1 F	1:51.05
2014	Bronze Angel	5	8-08	Louis Steward	Marcus Tregoning	14/1	1:48.68
2015	Third Time Lucky	3	8-04	Adam Beschizza	Richard Fahey	14/1	1:50.11
2016	Spark Plug	5	9-04	Jimmy Fortune	Brian Meehan	12/1	1:48.99
2017	Dolphin Vista	4	8-10	George Wood	Martyn Meade	50/1	1:51.24
2018	Wissahickon	3	9-05	Frankie Dettori	John Gosden	11/1	1:48.01
2019	Lord North	3	8-10	Frankie Dettori	John Gosden	9/2 F	1:46.99
2020	Majestic Dawn	4	8-08	Paul Hanagan	Paul & Oliver Cole	40/1	1:46.94
2021	Bedouin's Story	6	9-05	Jamie Spencer	Saeed bin Suroor	40/1	1:49.57
2022	Majestic	4	7-11	Aidan Keeley	Mick Channon	25/1	1:50.31
2023	Astro King	6	9-12	Richard Kingscote	Daniel & Claire Kubler	20/1	1:49.76
2024	Liberty Lane	4	9-12	Clifford Lee	Karl Burke	8/1	1:50.67
2025	Boiling Point	4	9-12	Clifford Lee	Karl Burke	14/1	1:49.42
2026	Pierre Royal	4	8-11	Mikey Sheehy	Adrian McGuinness	33/1	1:48.02

== Earlier winners ==
- 1839: Lanercost
- 1840: Roscius
- 1841: Vulcan
- 1842: Ralph
- 1843: Nat
- 1844: Evenus
- 1845: Alarm
- 1846: Prior of St Margarets
- 1847: The Widow
- 1848: Dacia
- 1849: Raby
- 1850: Landgrave
- 1851: Truth
- 1852: Knight of the Shire
- 1853: Little David
- 1854: Scherz
- 1855: Sultan
- 1856: Malacca
- 1857: Odd Trick
- 1858: Eurydice
- 1859: Red Eagle
- 1860: Weatherbound
- 1861: Palestro
- 1862: Bathilde
- 1863: Catch 'em Alive
- 1864: Ackworth
- 1865: Gardevisure
- 1866: Actaea
- 1867: Lozenge
- 1868: See Saw
- 1869: Vestminster
- 1870: Adonis
- 1871: Sabinus
- 1872: Playfair
- 1873: Montargis
- 1874: Peut-etre
- 1875: Sutton
- 1876: Rosebery
- 1877: Jongleur
- 1878: Isonomy
- 1879: La Merveille
- 1880: Lucetta
- 1881: Foxhall
- 1882: Hackness
- 1883: Bendigo
- 1884: Florence
- 1885: Plaisanterie
- 1886: The Sailor Prince
- 1887: Gloriation
- 1888: Veracity
- 1889: Laureate
- 1890: Alicante
- 1891: Comedy
- 1892: La Fleche
- 1893: Molly Morgan
- 1894: Indian Queen
- 1895: Marco
- 1896: Winkfield's Pride
- 1897: Comfrey
- 1898: Georgic
- 1899: Irish Ivy

== See also ==
- Horse racing in Great Britain
- List of British flat horse races
