= John Smith's Cup =

Flat horse race in Britain

- Class: Handicap
- Location: York Racecourse; York, England
- Inaugurated: 1960
- Race type: Flat
- Sponsor: John Smith's
- Website: York

Race information
- Distance: 1m 2f 56y
- Surface: Turf
- Track: Left-handed
- Qualification: Three-years-old and up
- Weight: Handicap
- Purse: £200,000 (2025); 1st: £103,080

John Smith's Cup
2026
Raammee	Hand Of God	Castle Stuart

Previous years
2025
Fox Legacy	See That Storm	Archivist
2024
Enfjaar	Botanical	Tony Montana
2023
Pride Of America	Astro King	Haunted Dream
2022
Anmaat	Achelois	Intellogent
2021
Johnny Drama	Cockalorum	Strait Of Hormuz

2020-2011
2020
Sinjaari	Certain Lad	Fifth Position
2019
Pivoine	Setting Sail	What's The Story
2018
Euchen Glen	Thundering Blue	Kynren
2017
Ballet Concerto	Big Country	Mistiroc
2016
Educate	Elbereth	Earth Drummer
2015
Master Carpenter	Kelinni	Mount Logan
2014
Farraaj	Zain Eagle	Bold Sniper
2013
Danchai	Stencive	Tres Coronas
2012
King's Warrior	Mid Mon Lady	Media Hype
2011
Green Destiny	Modun	Lost In The Moment

2010-2001
2010
Wigmore Hall	Kings Gambit	Demolition
2009
Sirvino	Kingdom Of Fife	Albaqaa
2008
Flying Clarets	Eradicate	Ezdiyaad
2007
Charlie Tokyo	Flying Clarets	Collateral Damage
2006
Fairmile	Bravo Maestro	Boo
2005
Mullins Bay	Crow Wood	Realism
2004
Arcalis	Promotion	Starry Lodge
2003
Far Lane	Etesaal	Persian Lightning
2002
Vintage Premium	Kirovski	Leadership
2001
Foreign Affairs	Man O'Mystery	Golconda

2000-1991
2000
Sobriety	Man O'Mystery	Nooshman
1999
Achilles	Siege	Golconda
1998
Porto Foricos	Pasternak	Cardigan Bay
1997
Pasternak	Najm Mubeen	Game Ploy
1996
Wilcuma	Spirito Libro	Arctiid
1995
Naked Welcome	Ringmaster	Yoush
1994
Cezanne	Midnight Legend	Mr Confusion
1993
Baron Ferdinand	King Athelstan	Jazilah
1992
Mr Confusion	Tell No Lies	Steerforth
1991
Halkopous	Northern Hal	Stop Press

1990-1988
1990
Eradicate	Halkopous	Inaad
1989
Icona	Afriyd	White-Wash
1988
Bashful Boy	Pelorus	Ile De Chypre

The John Smith's Cup (known until 1998 as the Magnet Cup) is a flat handicap horse race in Great Britain open to horses aged three years or older. It is run at York over a distance of 1 mile 2 furlongs and 56 yards (2,063 metres), and it is scheduled to take place each year in July.

It has been sponsored by John Smith's Brewery since its inauguration in 1960, making it the longest running commercial sponsorship in flat racing.

== Records ==
Most successful horse (2 wins):

- Prominent - 1971, 1972
- Chaumiere – 1985, 1986

Leading jockey (3 wins):

- Geoff Baxter - Prominent (1971, 1972), Take A Reef (1974)
- Willie Carson - Jolly Good (1975), Town And Country (1978), Bedtime (1983)
- Tony Ives - Chaumiere (1985, 1986), Icona (1989)

Leading trainer (6 wins):

- Dick Hern – Proud Chieftain (1961), Nortia (1962), Bold Pirate (1976), Town And Country (1978), Bedtime (1983), Straight Man (1984)

== Winners ==
- Weights given in stones and pounds.

Year	Winner	Age	Weight	Jockey	Trainer	SP	Time
1960	Fougalle	3	7-00	Norman McIntosh	Rufus Beasley	9/1	2:17.20
1961	Proud Chieftain	4	8-10	Harry Carr	Dick Hern	5/2F	2:11.60
1962	Nortia	3	8-04	Frankie Durr	Dick Hern	100/9	2:10.20
1963	Raccolto	6	8-03	Joe Sime	Sam Hall	6/1	2:12.00
1964	Space King	5	8-09	Edward Hide	Bill Hide	25/1	2:11.20
1965	Dark Court	4	8-06	Scobie Breasley	Gordon Richards	5/2F	2:11.20
1966	David Jack	3	7-06	Peter Robinson	Ted Lambton	4/1F	2:11.60
1967	Copsale	4	7-13	Lionel Brown	Ron Smyth	8/1	2:17.80
1968	Farm Walk	6	8-13	Johnny Seagrave	Rufus Beasley	8/1	2:14.20
1969	My Swanee	6	9-07	Lester Piggott	Bill Marshall	5/2	2:09.80
1970	Timon	4	7-04	Gordon Welsh	Doug Smith	10/1	2:13.00
1971	Prominent	4	8-08	Geoff Baxter	Arthur Budgett	10/1	2:10.90
1972	Prominent	5	9-04	Geoff Baxter	Arthur Budgett	4/1JF	2:13.20
1973	Peleid	3	7-09	Taffy Thomas	Bill Elsey	6/1	2:15.50
1974	Take A Reef	3	8-12	Geoff Baxter	Bruce Hobbs	11/1	2:09.49
1975	Jolly Good	3	7-08	Willie Carson	Bruce Hobbs	9/2	2:12.53
1976	Bold Pirate	4	9-03	Joe Mercer	Dick Hern	15/2	2:12.83
1977	Air Trooper	4	9-06	Taffy Thomas	Bill Wightman	9/2	2:11.48
1978	Town And Country	4	8-13	Willie Carson	Dick Hern	5/1	2:11.00
1979	Tesoro Mio	4	8-03	Edward Hide	Jimmy Etherington	8/1	2:08.22
1980	Fine Sun	3	7-08	Nicky Howe	Sally Hall	10/1	2:14.80
1981	Amyndas	3	8-05	Terry Lucas	Bruce Hobbs	7/1	2:14.76
1982	Buzzard's Bay	4	9-08	Mark Birch	Hugh Collingridge	7/1	2:08.62
1983	Bedtime	3	7-09	Willie Carson	Dick Hern	7/2JF	2:09.83
1984	Straight Man	3	8-11	Steve Cauthen	Dick Hern	2/1F	2:09.70
1985	Chaumiere	4	9-07	Tony Ives	Robert Williams	14/1	2:11.24
1986	Chaumiere	5	9-05	Tony Ives	Robert Williams	11/1	2:10.34
1987 (dh)	Brave Dancer; Wolsey (Note: Knockando finished 1st in 1987 but was placed 3rd after a stewards' enquiry)	3; 3	8-08; 8-06	Greville Starkey; Willie Ryan	Guy Harwood; Henry Cecil	9/4F; 4/1	2:11.31
1988	Bashful Boy	3	8-02	Dean McKeown	William Hastings-Bass	12/1	2:11.23
1989	Icona	3	9-08	Tony Ives	Michael Stoute	12/1	2:07.41
1990	Eradicate	5	9-04	Billy Newnes	Peter Calver	15/2	2:09.58
1991	Halkopous	5	7-03	Franny Norton	Mark Tompkins	7/2 JF	2:10.85
1992	Mr Confusion	4	8-03	Ollie Pears	Steve Norton	8/1	2:12.06
1993	Baron Ferdinand	3	8-09	Ray Cochrane	Roger Charlton	4/1 JF	2:08.50
1994	Cezanne	5	9-12	Gary Hind	Hilal Ibrahim	9/2	2:06.80
1995	Naked Welcome	3	8-04	Darryll Holland	Martin Fetherston-Godley	6/1	2:10.12
1996	Wilcuma	5	9-02	Pat Eddery	Peter Makin	10/1	2:08.53
1997	Pasternak	4	8-03	George Duffield	Sir Mark Prescott	13/2	2:08.80
1998	Porto Foricos	3	8-03	Jimmy Quinn	Henry Cecil	6/1	2:06.50
1999	Achilles	4	8-11	Jason Weaver	Karl Burke	25/1	2:07.58
2000	Sobriety	3	8-08	John Reid	Fulke Johnson Houghton	20/1	2:10.00
2001	Foreign Affairs	3	8-06	George Duffield	Sir Mark Prescott	5/2 Fav	2:10.15
2002	Vintage Premium	5	9-09	Paul Hanagan	Richard Fahey	20/1	2:08.24
2003	Far Lane	4	9-04	Michael Hills	Barry Hills	7/1	2:06.57
2004	Arcalis	4	9-02	Robert Winston	Howard Johnson	20/1	2:10.01
2005	Mullins Bay	4	9-07	Kieren Fallon	Aidan O'Brien	4/1 Fav	2:09.46
2006	Fairmile	4	8-12	Adam Kirby	Walter Swinburn	6/1 JF	2:07.66
2007 (Note: In 2007 the race was run over 9 furlongs)	Charlie Tokyo	4	8-09	Jamie Moriarty	Richard Fahey	11/1	1:56.61
2008	Flying Clarets	5	8-12	Frederik Tylicki	Richard Fahey	12/1	2:17.61
2009	Sirvino	4	8-08	Neil Brown	David Barron	16/1	2:07.18
2010	Wigmore Hall	3	8-02	Martin Lane	Michael Bell	5/1	2:08.65
2011	Green Destiny	4	8-10	Adam Beschizza	William Haggas	6/1	2:09.74
2012	King's Warrior	5	8-09	Robert Havlin	Peter Chapple-Hyam	33/1	2:08.28
2013	Danchai	4	8-11	Andrea Atzeni	William Haggas	10/1	2:07.79
2014	Farraaj	5	9-11	Andrea Atzeni	Roger Varian	6/1	2:07.96
2015	Master Carpenter	4	9-04	Philip Makin	Rod Millman	14/1	2:08.28
2016	Educate	7	9-08	Thomas Brown	Ismail Mohammed	18/1	2:07.34
2017	Ballet Concerto	4	9-03	James Doyle	Sir Michael Stoute	8/1	2:10.16
2018	Euchen Glen	5	9-03	Alistair Rawlinson	Jim Goldie	20/1	2:09.50
2019	Pivoine	5	9-08	Rob Hornby	Andrew Balding	14/1	2:10.38
2020	Sinjaari	4	8-11	Stevie Donohoe	William Haggas	11/1	2:09.48
2021	Johnny Drama	6	8-13	Joshua Bryan	Andrew Balding	22/1	2:11.82
2022	Anmaat	4	9-08	Kevin Stott	Owen Burrows	5/1 JF	2:08.37
2023	Pride of America	6	9-05	Frederick Larson	Amy Murphy	18/1	2:09.18
2024	Enfjaar	4	9-01	Jack Mitchell	Roger Varian	15/2	2:09.66
2025	Fox Legacy	4	9-04	P. J. McDonald	Andrew Balding	10/1	2:10.10
2026	Raammee	4	9-01	Ray Dawson	Roger Varian	5/1	2:09.35

== See also ==
- Horse racing in Great Britain
- List of British flat horse races
