= Ribblesdale Stakes =

Flat horse race in Britain

- Class: Group 2
- Location: Ascot Racecourse; Ascot, England
- Inaugurated: 1919
- Race type: Flat / Thoroughbred
- Website: Ascot

Race information
- Distance: 1m 3f 211y (2,406 metres)
- Surface: Turf
- Track: Right-handed
- Qualification: Three-year-old fillies
- Weight: 9 st 2 lb Penalties; 3 lb for G1 winners after 31 August 2024
- Purse: £250,000 (2025); 1st: £141,775

Ribblesdale Stakes
2026
Earth Shot	Johanna Walsh	Gilded Prize

Previous years
2025
Garden Of Eden	Understudy	Catalina Delcarpio
2024
Port Fairy	Lava Stream	Kalpana
2023
Warm Heart	Lumiere Rock	Bluestocking
2022
Magical Lagoon	Sea Silk Road	History
2021
Loving Dream	Eshaada	Nicest

2020-2011
2020
Frankly Darling	Ennistymon	Passion
2019
Star Catcher	Fleeting	Sparkle Roll
2018
Magic Wand	Wild Illusion	Sun Maiden
2017
Coronet	Mori	Hertford Dancer
2016
Even Song	Ajman Princess	The Black Princess
2015
Curvy	Pleascach	Pamona
2014
Bracelet	Lustrous	Criteria
2013
Riposte	Just Pretending	Elik
2012
Princess Highway	The Fugue	Shirocco Star
2011
Banimpire	Field of Miracles	Dorcas Lane

2010-2001
2010
Hibaayeb	Eldalil	Gallic Star
2009
Flying Cloud	Flame of Gibraltar	Uvinza
2008
Michita	Arthur's Girl	Hobby
2007
Silkwood	All My Loving	Dalvina
2006
Mont Etoile	Scottish Stage	Maroussies Wings
2005
Thakafaat	Twyla Tharp	Asawer
2004
Punctilious	Sahool	Quiff
2003
Spanish Sun	Ocean Silk	Mezzo Soprano
2002
Irresistible Jewel	Shadow Dancing	Red Rioja
2001
Sahara Slew	Nafisah	Marani

2000-1991
2000
Miletrian	Teggiano	Interlude
1999
Fairy Queen	Samoa	Alabaq
1998
Bahr	Star Begonia	Rambling Rose
1997
Yashmak	Akdariya	Crown Of Light
1996
Tulipa	Key Change	Shemozzle
1995
Phantom Gold	Tillandsia	Musetta
1994
Bolas	Gothic Dream	Pearl Kite
1993
Thawakib	Iviza	Talented
1992
Armarama	Niodini	Blushing Storm
1991
Third Watch	Finance Dancer	Sought Out

1990-1988
1990
Hellenic	Ivrea	Gharam
1989
Alydaress	Roseate Tern	Nearctic Flame
1988
Miss Boniface	Highbrow	Dutchess Best

The Ribblesdale Stakes is a Group 2 flat horse race in Great Britain open to three-year-old fillies. It is run at Ascot over a distance of 1 mile 3 furlongs and 211 yards (2,406 metres), and it is scheduled to take place each year in June.

== History ==
The event is named in honour of the 4th Baron Ribblesdale, who served as the Master of the Buckhounds from 1892 to 1895. It was established in 1919, and it was originally a 1-mile race open to three and four-year-olds of either gender.

The race was abandoned throughout World War II, and after it returned its distance was extended to 1½ miles. It was restricted to three-year-old fillies in 1950.

The Ribblesdale Stakes sometimes features fillies which ran previously in the Epsom Oaks. The leading participants often go on to compete in the following month's Irish Oaks, and the last to win both was Bracelet in 2014.

The Ribblesdale Stakes is now held on the third day of the five-day Royal Ascot meeting.

== Records ==
Leading jockey (8 wins):

- Frankie Dettori – Phantom Gold (1995), Bahr (1998), Fairy Queen (1999), Punctilious (2004), Flying Cloud (2009), Hibaayeb (2010), Star Catcher (2019), Frankly Darling (2020)

Leading trainer (6 wins): (includes jointly-trained winners)

- Aidan O'Brien - Bracelet (2014), Even Song (2016), Magic Wand (2018), Warm Heart (2023), Port Fairy (2024), Garden of Eden (2025)

== Winners ==
Year	Winner	Jockey	Trainer	Time
1919	Milton	George Colling	Jack Colling	
1920	Perion	Herbert Jones	Harry Sadler	
1921	The Yellow Dwarf	Bernard Carslake	Atty Persse	1:43.00
1922	Dry Toast	Bernard Carslake	Atty Persse	
1923	Leighon Tor	Frank Bullock	Alec Taylor Jr.	
1924	Live Wire	Tommy Weston	George Lambton	
1925	Glommen	Harry Wragg	Walter Earl	1:44.00
1926	Artist Glow	Charlie Elliott	George Dundas	1:49.80
1927	Foliation	Bobby Jones	Alec Taylor Jr.	1:44.00
1928	O'Curry	Rufus Beasley	Atty Persse	1:44.00
1929	Sir Cosmo	Joe Childs	William Walters	1:42.60
1930	Flying Argosy	Tommy Weston	Hugh Powney	1:48.80
1931	Doctor Dolittle	Harry Beasley Jr.	Atty Persse	1:47.20
1932	Rose En Soleil	Joe Childs	Dawson Waugh	1:40.60
1933	Versicle	Tommy Weston	George Lambton	1:43.60
1934	The Blue Boy	Joe Childs	Martin Hartigan	1:45.40
1935	Easton	Sir Gordon Richards	Fred Darling	1:49.00
1936	Can-Can	Percy Evans	Geoffrey Barling	1:45.80
1937	Rhodes Scholar	Bobby Jones	Joseph Lawson	1:43.00
1938	River Prince	Rufus Beasley	Cecil Boyd-Rochfort	1:41.40
1939	Ombro	Tommy Burns Sr.	Cecil Boyd-Rochfort	1:45.20
1940-47	No Race			
1948	Sandastre	Sir Gordon Richards	Gordon Johnson Houghton	2:38.60
1949	Colonist II	Thomas Hawcroft	Walter Nightingall	2:35.60
1950	La Baille	Charlie Smirke	Marcus Marsh	2:43.00
1951	Chinese Cracker	Scobie Breasley	Herbert Blagrave	2:34.80
1952	Esquilla	Rae Johnstone	Charles Semblat	2:35.20
1953	Skye	Bill Rickaby	Jack Jarvis	2:41.60
1954	Sweet One	Bill Rickaby	Jack Jarvis	2:40.40
1955	Ark Royal	Doug Smith	George Colling	2:38.69
1956	Milady	Charlie Smirke	Marcus Marsh	2:39.07
1957	Almeria	Harry Carr	Cecil Boyd-Rochfort	2:32.36
1958	None Nicer	Stan Clayton	Dick Hern	2:32.27
1959	Cantelo	Eddie Hide	Charles Elsey	2:32.18
1960	French Fern	Geoff Lewis	Jack Waugh	2:39.18
1961	Futurama	Scobie Breasley	Harry Wragg	2:38.60
1962	Tender Annie	Garnie Bougoure	Paddy Prendergast	2:36.74
1963	Ostrya	Jimmy Lindley	Jack Waugh	2:46.50
1964	Windmill Girl	Scobie Breasley	Arthur Budgett	2:36.80
1965	Bracey Bridge	Lester Piggott	Noel Murless	2:38.48
1966	Parthian Glance	Ron Hutchinson	George Todd	2:38.82
1967	Park Top	Russ Maddock	Bernard van Cutsem	2:35.65
1968	Pandora Bay	Taffy Thomas	Geoffrey Barling	2:35.40
1969	Sleeping Partner	John Gorton	Doug Smith	2:36.17
1970	Parmelia	Sandy Barclay	Noel Murless	2:32.33
1971	Fleet Wahine	Greville Starkey	Harry Thomson Jones	2:44.26
1972	Star Ship	Tony Murray	Ryan Price	2:36.86
1973	Miss Petard	Taffy Thomas	Ryan Jarvis	2:33.12
1974	Northern Princess	Tony Kimberley	Jeremy Hindley	2:36.96
1975	Gallina	Lester Piggott	Vincent O'Brien	2:37.75
1976	Catalpa	Alan Bond	Henry Cecil	2:29.29
1977	Nanticious	Wally Swinburn	Dermot Weld	2:40.60
1978	Relfo	Christy Roche	Paddy Prendergast	2:30.50
1979	Expansive	Willie Carson	Dick Hern	2:34.36
1980	Shoot A Line	Willie Carson	Dick Hern	2:29.27
1981	Strigida	Lester Piggott	Henry Cecil	2:33.72
1982	Dish Dash	Bruce Raymond	Robert Armstrong	2:33.44
1983	High Hawk	Willie Carson	John Dunlop	2:32.88
1984	Ballinderry	Tony Ives	Jeremy Tree	2:29.92
1985	Sally Brown	Walter Swinburn	Michael Stoute	2:31.46
1986	Gull Nook	Pat Eddery	John Dunlop	2:30.08
1987	Queen Midas	Willie Ryan	Henry Cecil	2:39.09
1988	Miss Boniface	Cash Asmussen	Paul Kelleway	2:29.92
1989	Alydaress	Steve Cauthen	Henry Cecil	2:31.95
1990	Hellenic	Walter Swinburn	Michael Stoute	2:35.79
1991	Third Watch	John Reid	John Dunlop	2:32.45
1992	Armarama	Michael Roberts	Clive Brittain	2:29.87
1993	Thawakib	Willie Carson	John Dunlop	2:38.53
1994	Bolas	Pat Eddery	Barry Hills	2:28.62
1995	Phantom Gold	Frankie Dettori	Lord Huntingdon	2:32.15
1996	Tulipa	Sylvain Guillot	André Fabre	2:31.41
1997	Yashmak	Kieren Fallon	Henry Cecil	2:33.21
1998	Bahr	Frankie Dettori	Saeed bin Suroor	2:38.33
1999	Fairy Queen	Frankie Dettori	Saeed bin Suroor	2:29.87
2000	Miletrian	Michael Roberts	Mick Channon	2:33.35
2001	Sahara Slew	Johnny Murtagh	John Oxx	2:29.57
2002	Irresistible Jewel	Pat Smullen	Dermot Weld	2:31.35
2003	Spanish Sun	Richard Hughes	Sir Michael Stoute	2:31.07
2004	Punctilious	Frankie Dettori	Saeed bin Suroor	2:30.12
2005 ^{[a]}	Thakafaat	Willie Supple	John Dunlop	2:31.18
2006	Mont Etoile	Michael Hills	William Haggas	2:30.23
2007	Silkwood	Philip Robinson	Michael Jarvis	2:30.23
2008	Michita	Jimmy Fortune	John Gosden	2:31.87
2009	Flying Cloud	Frankie Dettori	Saeed bin Suroor	2:30.67
2010	Hibaayeb	Frankie Dettori	Saeed bin Suroor	2:31.18
2011	Banimpire	Kevin Manning	Jim Bolger	2:37.06
2012	Princess Highway	Pat Smullen	Dermot Weld	2:33.67
2013	Riposte	Tom Queally	Lady Cecil	2:29.41
2014	Bracelet	Joseph O'Brien	Aidan O'Brien	2:30.92
2015	Curvy	Ryan Moore	David Wachman	2:30.04
2016	Even Song	Ryan Moore	Aidan O'Brien	2:39.74
2017	Coronet	Olivier Peslier	John Gosden	2:32.06
2018	Magic Wand	Ryan Moore	Aidan O'Brien	2:28.52
2019	Star Catcher	Frankie Dettori	John Gosden	2:33.52
2020	Frankly Darling	Frankie Dettori	John Gosden	2:33.29
2021	Loving Dream	Robert Havlin	John & Thady Gosden	2:33.18
2022	Magical Lagoon	Shane Foley	Jessica Harrington	2:31.36
2023	Warm Heart	Ryan Moore	Aidan O'Brien	2:30.41
2024	Port Fairy	Ryan Moore	Aidan O'Brien	2:29.04
2025	Garden of Eden	Ryan Moore	Aidan O'Brien	2:28.91
2026	Earth Shot	James Doyle	William Haggas	2:30.18

^{a} The 2005 running took place at York.

== See also ==
- Horse racing in Great Britain
- List of British flat horse races
