= John Smith (brewer) =

English brewer

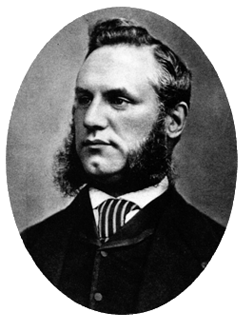
John Smith

John Smith (18 March 1824 – 9 September 1879) was an English brewer. He is best known for establishing the John Smith's Brewery in Tadcaster, North Yorkshire, which continues to operate.

== History ==
Smith was born in Leeds on 18 March 1824; the eldest of five children of Samuel Smith, a wealthy butcher and tanner from Leeds.

In 1847 John Smith purchased the Backhouse & Hartley brewery with funding provided by his father. Smith's timing proved fortuitous; pale ales were displacing porter as the public's most popular style of beer, and Tadcaster's hard water proved to be well-suited for brewing the new style. The prosperity of the 1850s and 1860s, together with the arrival of the railways, realised greater opportunities for brewers, and by 1861 Smith employed eight men in his brewing and malting enterprise.

The operations became sizeable during the last quarter of the nineteenth century. Smith died at Tadcaster on 9 September 1879, leaving an estate valued at under £45,000 (equivalent to £5,779,342 in 2023), and his assets were jointly inherited by his two brothers, William (a gentleman) and Samuel Smith (a tanner).
