= Stevie Donohoe =

Irish jockey

Stephen "Stevie" Donohoe (born 28 February 1984) is an Irish jockey who competes in flat racing. He was British Champion Apprentice in 2006.

Donohoe grew up in Athlone in County Westmeath and learnt to ride at a local riding school before attending the Racing Academy and Centre of Education in Kildare. He served his apprenticeship with trainers Christy Roche in Ireland, Dave Evans in Wales, and Willie Musson in Newmarket. In 2006 he won British flat racing Champion Apprentice title with 44 winners, finishing four ahead of his main challengers. He also received the Lester Award for Apprentice Jockey of the Year.

He achieved his first Royal Ascot win in 2017, when Rajasinghe, trained by Richard Spencer, landed the Group 2 Coventry Stakes. In 2021 he spent six months riding in Mauritius, winning the local Group 1 Mauritius Derby. In 2022 he won the Group 2 German 2,000 Guineas on Maljoom, trained by William Haggas. At the end of the season, he signed a three-year contract to ride in Mauritius.
