= York Stakes =

- Class: Group 2
- Location: York Racecourse; York, England
- Inaugurated: 2006
- Race type: Flat / Thoroughbred
- Sponsor: Sky Bet
- Website: York

Race information
- Distance: 1m 2f 56y (2,063 m)
- Surface: Turf
- Track: Left-handed
- Qualification: Three-years-old and up
- Weight: 8 st 13 lb (3yo); 9 st 8 lb (4yo+); Allowances; 3 lb for fillies and mares Penalties; 5 lb for Group 1 winners * 3 lb for Group 2 winners * * after 2024
- Purse: £150,000 (2025); 1st: £85,065

York Stakes
2026
Item	Pride Of Arras	Damysus

Previous years
2025
Royal Champion	Almaqam	Ecureuil Secret
2024
Alflaila	King's Gambit	Passenger
2023
Alflaila	My Prospero	Royal Champion
2022
Sir Busker	Dubai Honour	Dubai Future
2021
Bangkok	Juan Elcano	Mohaafeth

2020-2011
2020
Aspetar	Fox Chairman	Lord Glitters
2019
Elarqam	Addeybb	Knight To Behold
2018
Thundering Blue	Brorocco	Elarqam
2017
Success Days	Mondialiste	Hathal
2016
Time Test	Mondialiste	Countermeasure
2015
Tullius	Top Notch Tonto	Prince Gibraltar
2014
Sheikhzayedroad	Secret Gesture	Windhoek
2013
Mukhadram	Grandeur	Wigmore Hall
2012
Sri Putra	Afsare	Side Glance
2011
Twice Over	Ransom Note	Dominant

2010-2006
2010
Summit Surge	Bushman	Allybar
2009
Kirklees	Allied Powers	Kings Gambit
2008
Pipedreamer	Campanologist	Supaseus
2007
Stage Gift	Eagle Mountain	Take A Bow
2006
Best Alibi	Hattan	Crocodile Dundee

The York Stakes is a Group 2 flat horse race in Great Britain open to horses aged three years or older. It is run at York over a distance of 1 mile 2 furlongs and 56 yards (2,063 metres), and it is scheduled to take place each year in July.

The event was established in 2006, and the inaugural running was won by Best Alibi. It replaced the Scottish Derby, a discontinued race at Ayr.

The York Stakes serves as a possible trial for the following month's International Stakes, which is contested over the same course and distance. Twice Over in 2011 and Item in 2026 have won both races in the same year.

== Records ==
Most successful horse (2 wins):

- Alflaila - (2023, 2024)

Leading jockey:

- no jockey has won this race more than once

Leading trainer (3 wins):

- Andrew Balding - Tullius (2015), Bangkok (2021), Item (2026)

== Winners ==
Year	Winner	Age	Jockey	Trainer	Time
2006	Best Alibi	3	Ryan Moore	Sir Michael Stoute	2:07.93
2007	Stage Gift	4	Jamie Spencer	Saeed bin Suroor	2:13.31
2008	Pipedreamer	4	Seb Sanders	John Gosden	2:08.28
2009	Kirklees	5	Frankie Dettori	Saeed bin Suroor	2:10.27
2010	Summit Surge	6	Kieren Fallon	Luca Cumani	2:08.82
2011	Twice Over	6	Tom Queally	Sir Henry Cecil	2:09.99
2012	Sri Putra	6	Neil Callan	Roger Varian	2:05.74
2013	Mukhadram	4	Paul Hanagan	William Haggas	2:07.18
2014	Sheikhzayedroad	5	Martin Lane	David Simcock	2:06.26
2015	Tullius	7	Philip Makin	Andrew Balding	2:06.25
2016	Time Test	4	Pat Smullen	Roger Charlton	2:06.93
2017	Success Days	5	Shane Foley	Ken Condon	2:10.59
2018	Thundering Blue	5	Fran Berry	David Menuisier	2:09.41
2019	Elarqam	4	Dane O'Neill	Mark Johnston	2:12.47
2020	Aspetar	5	Jason Watson	Roger Charlton	2:07.51
2021	Bangkok	5	David Probert	Andrew Balding	2:16.43
2022	Sir Busker	6	Ben Curtis	William Knight	2:11.88
2023	Alflaila	4	Andrea Atzeni	Owen Burrows	2:10.17
2024	Alflaila	5	Jim Crowley	Owen Burrows	2:20.36
2025	Royal Champion	7	Clifford Lee	Karl Burke	2:05.64
2026	Item	3	Rob Hornby	Andrew Balding	2:11.56

== See also ==
- Horse racing in Great Britain
- List of British flat horse races
