= Cathy Gannon =

Irish jockey

Personal information
- Born: 21 September 1981 (age 44) Dublin, Ireland
- Occupation: Jockey

Horse racing career
- Sport: Horse racing
- Career wins: 440 (UK and Ireland)

Racing awards
- Irish flat racing Champion Apprentice (2004); The Irish Times Sportswoman of the Year (2004); Lester Awards; Lady Jockey of the Year (2010, 2011, 2015)
- Updated on 21 January 2022

Cathy Gannon (born 21 September 1981) is a retired Irish flat racing jockey.

== Life and career ==
Gannon was born in Dublin, Ireland on 21 September 1981. She learnt to ride on ponies at an early age, and when she was 15, she took the course at the Apprentice Jockey's School, located in County Kildare. After this, she went to Curragh, where she joined the stable of John Oxx.

Her first ride was at Wexford in 1998, where she finished in third place. Later in the same year, at Tipperary, she rode her first winner on Quivelly. She became the first woman to become Irish champion apprentice jockey in 2004 with 33 winners and was awarded the Irish Times Sportswoman of the Year Award. She relocated to England in 2006, where her chief employer was David Evans, and she became the first Irish-born female rider to compete in the Dubai Duty Free Shergar Cup, after Hayley Turner dropped out due to injury.

She was awarded the Lady Jockey of the Year Lester Award three times - in 2010, 2011 and 2015 - but after breaking all five toes in her left foot at Lingfield on 25 May 2016, she came close to needing amputation. She recovered well enough to be able to walk and ride, but not sufficiently to be able to race ride, and announced her retirement in July 2017. She moved with her family back to Ireland later that year, to become a jockey coach.

Her best year had been 2011, when she had 71 winners for a total of £382,841 in prize money and her biggest individual win had been her only group race victory on Dingle View in the 2010 Round Tower Stakes. Her career total was 440 winners in the UK and Ireland.

== See also ==
- List of jockeys
