= Waterloo (horse) =

British-bred Thoroughbred racehorse

- Sire: Bold Lad (IRE)
- Grandsire: Bold Ruler
- Dam: Lakewoods
- Damsire: Hyperion
- Sex: Mare
- Foaled: 1969
- Country: United Kingdom
- Colour: Chestnut
- Breeder: New England Stud
- Owner: Richard Stanley
- Trainer: Bill Watts
- Record: 11: 6-3-1

Major wins
- Queen Mary Stakes (1971); Cheveley Park Stakes (1971); 1000 Guineas (1972); Falmouth Stakes (1972)

Awards
- Timeform rating 120

Waterloo (foaled 1969) was a British Thoroughbred racehorse and broodmare best known for winning the classic 1000 Guineas in 1972. Waterloo was one of the leading British two-year-olds of 1971 when her wins included the Queen Mary Stakes and the Cheveley Park Stakes. In the following year she followed up her victory in the Guineas by winning the Falmouth Stakes. She was later sold and exported to the United States and had some success as a broodmare.

== Background ==
Waterloo was a chestnut mare with a white star bred by Richard Stanley at the New England stud. She was one of the first crop of foals sired by Bold Lad (IRE), the leading European two-year-old of 1966. Waterloo's dam Lakewood was a descendant of Orama, making her a close relative of the 2000 Guineas winner Nearula and the Australian champion Todman. The filly was sent into training with Bill Watts at Richmond, North Yorkshire and raced in the colours of Richard Stanley's wife, Susan. She was ridden in most of her races by the leading northern jockey Edward "Eddie" Hide.

== Racing career ==
=== 1971: two-year-old season ===
After winning on her debut, Waterloo was sent to Royal Ascot in June where she won the Queen Mary Stakes by six lengths at odds of 9/2. In August she was sent to France where she was matched against colts in the Prix Robert Papin. She finished fifth behind Sun Prince and Deep Diver. On her return to England she finished second to Rose Dubarry in the Lowther Stakes at York. In September she was sent to Scotland where she won the Harry Rosebery Trophy at Ayr Racecourse. On her final appearance she contested the Cheveley Park Stakes at Newmarket and won at odds of 100/30 by one and a half lengths from Mariela.

=== 1972: three-year-old season ===
Waterloo began her three-year-old season by finishing third to the colts High Top and My Brief in the Classic Trial at Thirsk Racecourse having been eased down in the closing stages. At Newmarket on 27 April she was one of eighteen fillies to contest the 1000 Guineas over the Rowley Mile course. Ridden as usual by Hide, she took the lead a quarter of a mile from the finish and won by two lengths from Marisela and Rose Dubarry.

At Royal Ascot in June she finished second by a neck to the Irish-trained filly Calve in the Coronation Stakes. In the following month she won the Falmouth Stakes, beating Miss Paris by a head. On her final appearance she ran in the Strensall Stakes at York in which she finished second to Pearl Star, to whom she was conceding eleven pounds.

== Assessment ==
In their book, A Century of Champions, based on the Timeform rating system, John Randall and Tony Morris rated Waterloo an "inferior" winner of the 1000 Guineas. Waterloo was given a rating of 120 by the independent Timeform organisation.

== Breeding record ==
At the end of her racing career, Waterloo was sold for a price in excess of £100,000 and exported to the United States. The best of her offspring was Water Cay (sired by J O Tobin), who finished second in the Queen Anne Stakes in 1987. Her daughter Water Woo (by Tom Rolfe) produced the Eclipse Stakes winner Environment Friend.

1975 Water Frolic (USA) : Bay filly (second foal), by Sir Ivor (USA) – won 3 races including the Fern Hill Handicap, Ascot and placed 2nd twice from 7 starts in England 1978

1976 Water Woo (USA) : Chestnut filly, foaled 19 May, by Tom Rolfe (USA) – won race from 1 start in France 1978, dam of Environment Friend (GB)(1988, by Cozzene (USA)), won G1 Eclipse Stakes, Sandown; G2 Dante Stakes, York; 2nd G1 Coronation Cup, Epsom twice

1978 Vaslav (USA) : Chestnut colt, by Nijinsky (CAN) – won 1 race from 3 starts in England 1981-2

1983 Water Cay (USA) : Brown colt, foaled 11 February, by J.O. Tobin (USA) – won 4 races including the Donnington Castle Stakes, Newbury; 2nd G2 Royal Lodge Stakes, Ascot; G2 Queen Anne Stakes, Royal Ascot; 3rd G1 Futurity Stakes, Doncaster from 13 starts in England 1985-7

== Pedigree ==
Pedigree of Waterloo (GB), chestnut mare, 1969
Sire Bold Lad (IRE) 1964	Bold Ruler (USA); 1954	Nasrullah	Nearco
Sire Bold Lad (IRE) 1964	Bold Ruler (USA); 1954	Nasrullah	Mumtaz Begum
Sire Bold Lad (IRE) 1964	Bold Ruler (USA); 1954	Miss Disco	Discovery
Sire Bold Lad (IRE) 1964	Bold Ruler (USA); 1954	Miss Disco	Outdone
Sire Bold Lad (IRE) 1964	Barn Pride (GB); 1957	Democratic	Denturius
Sire Bold Lad (IRE) 1964	Barn Pride (GB); 1957	Democratic	Light Fantasy
Sire Bold Lad (IRE) 1964	Barn Pride (GB); 1957	Fair Alycia	Alycidon
Sire Bold Lad (IRE) 1964	Barn Pride (GB); 1957	Fair Alycia	Fair Edwine
Dam Lakewoods (GB) 1958	Hyperion (GB); 1930	Gainsborough	Bayardo
Dam Lakewoods (GB) 1958	Hyperion (GB); 1930	Gainsborough	Rosedrop
Dam Lakewoods (GB) 1958	Hyperion (GB); 1930	Selene	Chaucer
Dam Lakewoods (GB) 1958	Hyperion (GB); 1930	Selene	Serenissima
Dam Lakewoods (GB) 1958	Holwood (GB); 1951	Umidwar	Blandford
Dam Lakewoods (GB) 1958	Holwood (GB); 1951	Umidwar	Uganda
Dam Lakewoods (GB) 1958	Holwood (GB); 1951	Beausite	Bold Archer
Dam Lakewoods (GB) 1958	Holwood (GB); 1951	Beausite	Orama (Family: 1-u)
