= Campbell Gillies =

Scottish National Hunt jockey

- Born: 27 June 1990; Haddington, East Lothian, Scotland
- Died: 26 June 2012 (aged 21); Corfu, Greece
- Occupation: Jockey

Campbell Gillies (27 June 1990 – 26 June 2012) was a Scottish National Hunt jockey most notable for his victory on Brindisi Breeze in the Albert Bartlett Novices' Hurdle at the 2012 Cheltenham Festival. In total, he rode 131 winners in his career, mainly for top Scottish trainer Lucinda Russell and was widely considered by pundits and fans alike as one of the leading young jockeys in the UK.

== Career ==
Gillies had his first ride aged 15, riding for trainer Willie Amos in Hawick. His first winner was for Amos on Gunson Hight at Hexham Racecourse on 12 May 2007. Later that year, after leaving school, he moved to be conditional jockey with Lucinda Russell in Kinross-shire. In his first full season he went on to record 11 wins from 55 runners.

While at Russell's yard, he came under the tutelage of former British jump racing Champion Jockey, Peter Scudamore and the stable's number one jockey Peter Buchanan. Scudamore himself believed Gillies to be a 'genius in a race', and he was widely considered to be one of the rising stars of jumps racing.

His first major victory was in 2009 at the Grand National meeting at Aintree racecourse, when he won the John Smith's Handicap Hurdle on the Russell-trained 66-1 outsider Culcabock. He went on to ride over 50 winners for Russell and it was with another horse of hers, the novice hurdler Brindisi Breeze, that he had his biggest victory - the Albert Bartlett Novices' Hurdle at the 2012 Cheltenham Festival. This festival success capped his best ever season, which he finished with 38 winners from 300 rides. Gillies was posthumously recognised at the 2013 Lester Award ceremony with the Jump Jockey Special Recognition Award for 2012.

== Death ==
Gillies was found dead in a swimming pool at the Corfu holiday apartments where he was staying with fellow jockeys Henry Brooke, Nathan Moscrop, Harry Haynes and Mark Ellwood. The friends had returned from an evening out and had gone for a morning swim at around 8am local time. Gillies went under the water and failed to resurface. A Greek coroner recorded his death was caused by drowning and a police spokesman revealed that toxicological reports revealed he had been drinking.

== Personal life ==
Gillies was educated at Knox Academy in Haddington and was also a graduate of the British Racing School. His brother is the Glasgow Warriors hooker Finlay Gillies.

He was voted Britain's 'Best Looking Jockey' by female racegoers at Hexham racecourse's ladies day in 2011.

== Career statistics ==
=== Notable race wins ===
- John Smith's Handicap Hurdle, Aintree: Culcabock 2009
- Albert Bartlett Novices' Hurdle: Brindisi Breeze 2012

=== Seasonal totals of winners ===
- 2007/08 11
- 2008/09 27
- 2009/10 22
- 2010/11 29
- 2011/12 38
- 2012/13 4
- Career Flat winners 2
