= John Smith's Brewery =

Brewery in Tadcaster, North Yorkshire, England

- Industry: Brewing
- Predecessor: Backhouse & Hartley
- Founded: 1852
- Founder: John Smith
- Headquarters: Tadcaster, North Yorkshire, England
- Products: Beer
- Production output: 3.8 million hectolitres (1.3 million hl of John Smith's)
- Owner: Heineken UK
- Number of employees: c.300 (c. 2012)
- Parent: Heineken International

John Smith's Brewery in Tadcaster, North Yorkshire, England, produces beers including John Smith's, the highest selling bitter in the United Kingdom since the mid-1990s.

The majority of John Smith's sales are of the nitrogenated Extra Smooth product, although a cask conditioned variant is available nationally. A stronger variant called Magnet is also available in the North East of England. John Smith's Cask and Magnet are produced under licence by Cameron's in Hartlepool.

John Smith acquired the Backhouse & Hartley brewery in 1852. Following a series of acquisitions in the post-World War II period, the company became one of the largest regional brewers in the country, operating over 1,800 licensed premises. The company was taken over by Courage in 1970 who extended distribution of the brewery's products into the South of England. Courage was acquired by Scottish & Newcastle in 1995, and the operations were purchased by Heineken in 2008.

John Smith's Extra Smooth is produced at the Tadcaster brewery, as well as a range of Heineken products including Amstel and Foster's. With a 38 million litre capacity, the brewery is one of the largest in the country.

John Smith's became well known for a series of highly successful "No Nonsense"-themed television advertising campaigns, featuring the dour Yorkshireman character "Arkwright" during the 1970s and 1980s (shown only in the South of England), followed by the comedians Jack Dee during the 1990s and Peter Kay since 2002. The brand also has an association with horse racing: it was the principal sponsor of the Grand National between 2005 and 2013, the Northumberland Plate from 2003 until 2016, and has sponsored the John Smith's Cup since 1960.

== History ==
=== Early years ===
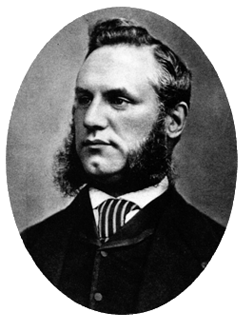
John Smith

Stephen Hartley began brewing in Tadcaster in 1758. Jane Hartley mortgaged the brewery to David Backhouse and John Hartley in 1845. Samuel Smith of Leeds arranged for his son John to enter the business in 1847. Jane Hartley died in 1852, and John Smith acquired the business, enlisting his brother William to assist. The timing was to prove fortuitous; pale ales were displacing porter as the beer of choice, and Tadcaster's hard water proved to be well-suited for brewing the new style. The prosperity of the 1850s and 1860s, together with the arrival of the railways, realised greater opportunities for brewers, and John Smith employed eight men in his brewing and malting enterprise by 1861.

The operations became sizeable during the last quarter of the nineteenth century. Smith died in 1879, leaving an estate valued at under £45,000 (around £4.1 million in 2016 adjusted for inflation), and his assets were jointly inherited by his two brothers, William and Samuel Smith, a tanner. William purchased Samuel's share of his brother's personal estate, and built a modern brewery in 1883–4 at the cost of £130,000 (£9.7 million in 2013). By this time the business employed over 100 people. William Smith died in 1886, and the firm was inherited in partnership by his two nephews, Henry Herbert Riley (1863 - 1911) and Frank Riley, henceforth known as Riley-Smith under the terms of his will.

The firm expanded throughout the 1880s by creating an agency network, establishing sixteen offices in nearby settlements, and offering free trade discounts on their beer of 20 per cent or higher. The brewery had an annual output of 150,000 barrels by 1889. In 1889, the company's first scientifically trained head brewer was appointed, Percy Clinch, son of Charles Clinch of the Eagle Brewery in Witney. In 1892, the partnership became a limited company called John Smith's Tadcaster Brewery Company Limited, with Henry Herbert Riley-Smith as chairman. In 1899 the company acquired Simpson & Co of Market Weighton, with 51 public houses, and converted the brewery into a maltings.

By the turn of the century the brewery was considered to be one of the best-run in Britain, "a byword for first-class management". In 1907, John Marples of Sheffield, the wines and spirits distributor, was acquired. The company began to bottle its own beer in Tadcaster from 1907. In 1912, the company owned over 250 horses, 41 of which saw service during the First World War. Artificially carbonated beer was first bottled in 1923. Paired horse drays were phased out by 1929. During and for some time after the World Wars, the Government raised the duty on beer, and forced brewers to lower their beer strength. During this period, substitutes for malted barley had to be used for brewing, including flaked barley, oats and rye.

The last of the company's dray horses was retired in 1947. Horses had delivered beer to all the areas surrounding the brewery, as far afield as Pateley Bridge. From 1948 the company exported beer to Belgium where it was bottled and distributed by Tilkens brewery. In 1950 there was a general strike in Belgium, and John Smith's hired two Handley Page Halifax heavy bomber aircraft to carry 7 ton loads twice-daily of their beers into the country in order to ensure supply. In 1953 the firm became a public company, with fixed assets of around £5 million, 1,000 licensed premises and around 1,100 employees. In 1958, Whitworth, Son & Nephew of Wath-upon-Dearne was acquired with 165 licensed houses, and the brewery was immediately closed down. In 1959 the company began to bottle imported Alken lager at Tadcaster, in response to growing customer demand. In 1961 the company also began to bottle Carlsberg lager. By 1960 the company had an estate of 909 public houses.

In 1961, John Smith's acquired the Barnsley Brewery Company, adding 250 licensed properties to their growing estate. The company acquired Warwicks & Richardsons of Newark-on-Trent, with 474 pubs, in 1962. Whilst some product rationalisation took place, popular lines such as Warwicks' Milk Maid Stout were retained. John Smith's closed down all the breweries it acquired, apart from Barnsley, where it invested in the brewery, and added production of John Smith beers to the site, as well as increasing the distribution of Barnsley Bitter. As a result of acquisitions, by 1967 John Smith's was the third largest regional brewer in the country after Courage and Scottish & Newcastle, with fixed assets of £30 million. Acquisitions diluted the Riley-Smith family stake in the company to around 10 per cent.

=== 1970–present: Courage takeover and the growth of John Smith's Bitter ===
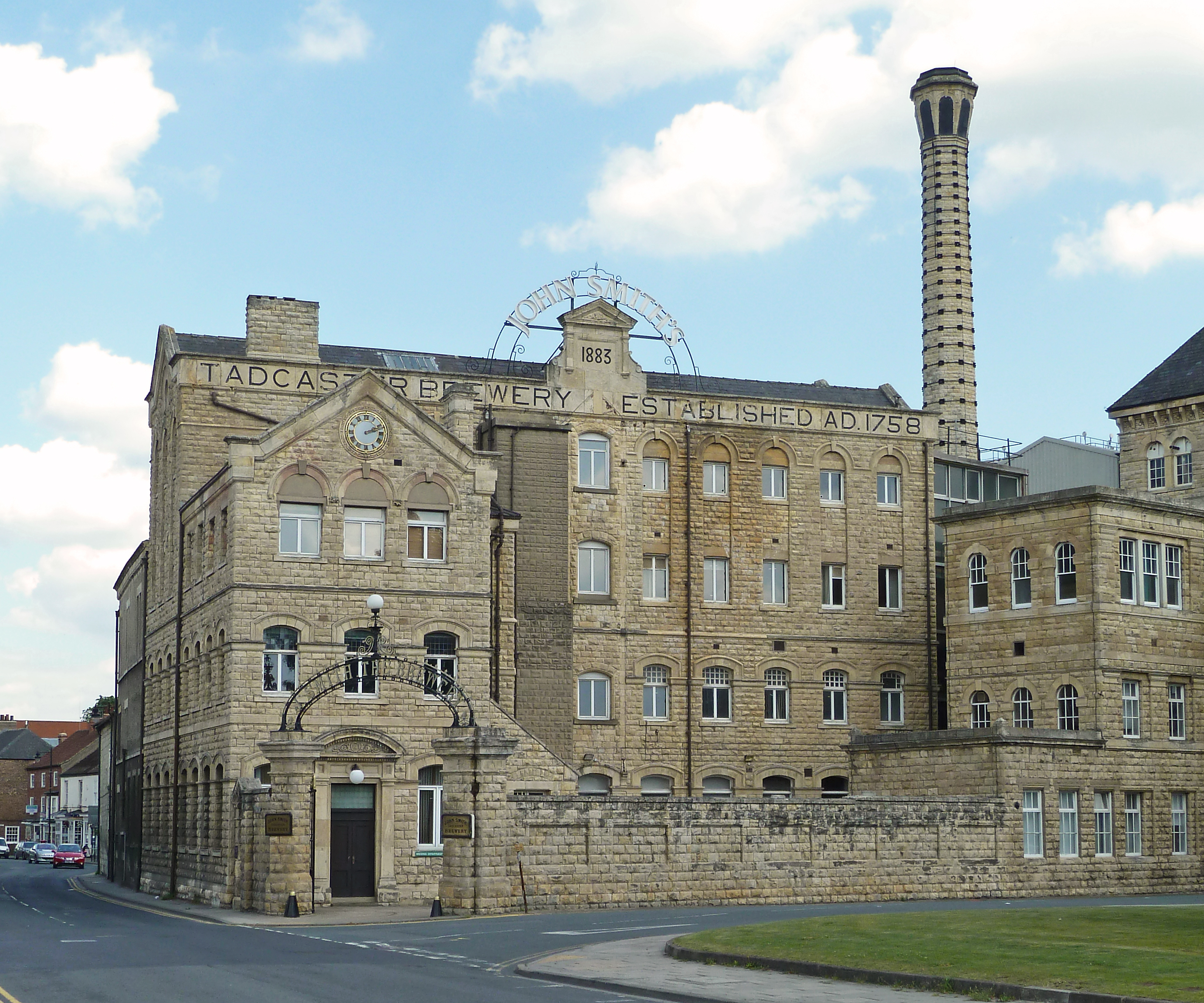
William Smith's 1884 brewery, Tadcaster

In October 1970, Courage purchased John Smith's in a friendly takeover which valued the company at £40 million (equivalent to £549 million in 2025). By this time John Smith's owned around 1,800 licensed premises throughout the north of England, and as far south as Lincolnshire, Nottinghamshire and parts of Cambridgeshire and Shropshire. The merged company held assets worth £137 million. By combining Courage's strength in the South of England, and John Smith's in the North, a national brewing company was created. John Smith's bottled Magnet Pale Ale was selected for nationwide distribution across the group, and the takeover facilitated the wider distribution of Courage brands such as Tavern Keg.

The Tadcaster brewery was substantially redeveloped and expanded throughout 1974. Courage closed down the Barnsley brewery in 1976 with the loss of 200 jobs. Barnsley Bitter was replaced by John Smith's bitter. Courage argued that modernisation of the Barnsley site would have required "massive" investment. It was reported in The Times that landlords were generally indifferent to the change, as the taste profiles of John Smith's bitter and Barnsley bitter were similar.

After successful test marketing from 1974, John Smith's Bitter was distributed in the South of England from 1979 onwards, accompanied by an extensive marketing budget. As research by Courage indicated that Southern drinkers considered Yorkshire bitter to be superior, the beer was sold there under the name John Smith's Yorkshire Bitter. Sales of the beer doubled in 1981 owing to the increase in free trade outlets in the South stocking the beer. By 1982 it was the highest selling Courage brand and the highest selling canned bitter in the United Kingdom.

In 1982, the John Smith's brands included Yorkshire Bitter, Magnet Pale Ale, Export Pale, Sweet Stout, Double Brown and Magnet Old. In December 1983, John Smith's Cask (3.8% ABV) was re-introduced, seven years after it had been phased out. By June 1985, John Smith's produced 1.7 million hectolitres (1.0 million imperial barrels) of beer annually. In November that year, a new brewhouse was opened, at the cost of £5 million. Production of Foster's lager began in 1987.

In 1993, John Smith's Extra Smooth was launched in cans. It was introduced in kegs in February 1995, and distributed to 10,000 pubs and venues. It is a nitrogenated version of the pasteurised beer, which was renamed to John Smith's Original in order to differentiate the two products.

In 2005, Scottish & Newcastle claimed that John Smith's was available in 40,000 outlets across the United Kingdom. In 2007, Scottish & Newcastle moved production of John Smith's Cask from Tadcaster to Burtonwood near Warrington, and production of John Smith's Magnet to Camerons Brewery of Hartlepool. In 2008 three limited edition beers were released to celebrate the 250th anniversary of the brewery. In 2010 Heineken discontinued production of cask conditioned John Smith's Magnet, although it remains available in kegs. By 2011, production of John Smith's Cask had moved to Cameron's. As of 2012, John Smith's is the sixth highest selling beer brand in the United Kingdom and the highest selling bitter in the world. From February 2013, John Smith's Extra Smooth and Original were reduced from 3.8 to 3.6% ABV. According to Heineken, the decision was taken in order to bring the product in line with the strength of its major competitors such as Tetley, Boddingtons and Worthington. John Smith's Original, the non-nitrogenated variant, was discontinued in 2025.

== Beers ==
- John Smith's Extra Smooth (3.4% ABV). The highest selling variant, available in kegs and cans. It is nitrogenated and pasteurised.
- John Smith's Cask (3.8% ABV). Available nationwide, but most often found around the brewery's Yorkshire heartland.
- John Smith's Magnet (4% ABV). A keg product, most frequently found around the North East and Yorkshire.

== Brewery ==
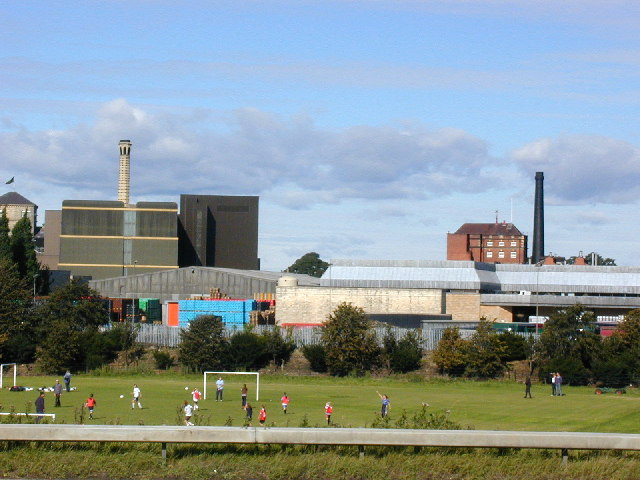
Modern buildings of the John Smith's Brewery.

The brewery brews 3.8 million hectolitres annually (1.3 million of which is John Smith's beer), and employed around 300 people in 2008. It has two keg lines, two bottle lines and one canning line. It currently brews and packages the ale brands John Smith's Extra Smooth and Newcastle Brown Ale, and the lager brands Foster's, Amstel and Tiger.

Slate Yorkshire Square brewing vessels were used at the brewery from 1913 until 1975. Stainless steel Yorkshire Squares were in use by at least 1953, but were removed in the 1980s, and the brewery now uses conical tanks. By 1953, the brewery site occupied 20 acres.

Wooden casks were still in use in the 1960s. The cask beer line was removed in 1976, but restored in 1984. A new canning line and a new brewhouse were installed around 1982.

In 1984 the original brewhouse was converted into a brewery museum. In November 1985 a new £5 million brewhouse opened. Production of Foster's Lager began in 1987. By 1989 the brewery had a production capacity of 1.2 million barrels per annum. Scottish & Newcastle used the John Smith's Brewery to brew many of its ale brands. In 2004, a new £24 million bottling facility was opened in 2004, described as the most modern bottling facility in Europe.

== Advertising ==
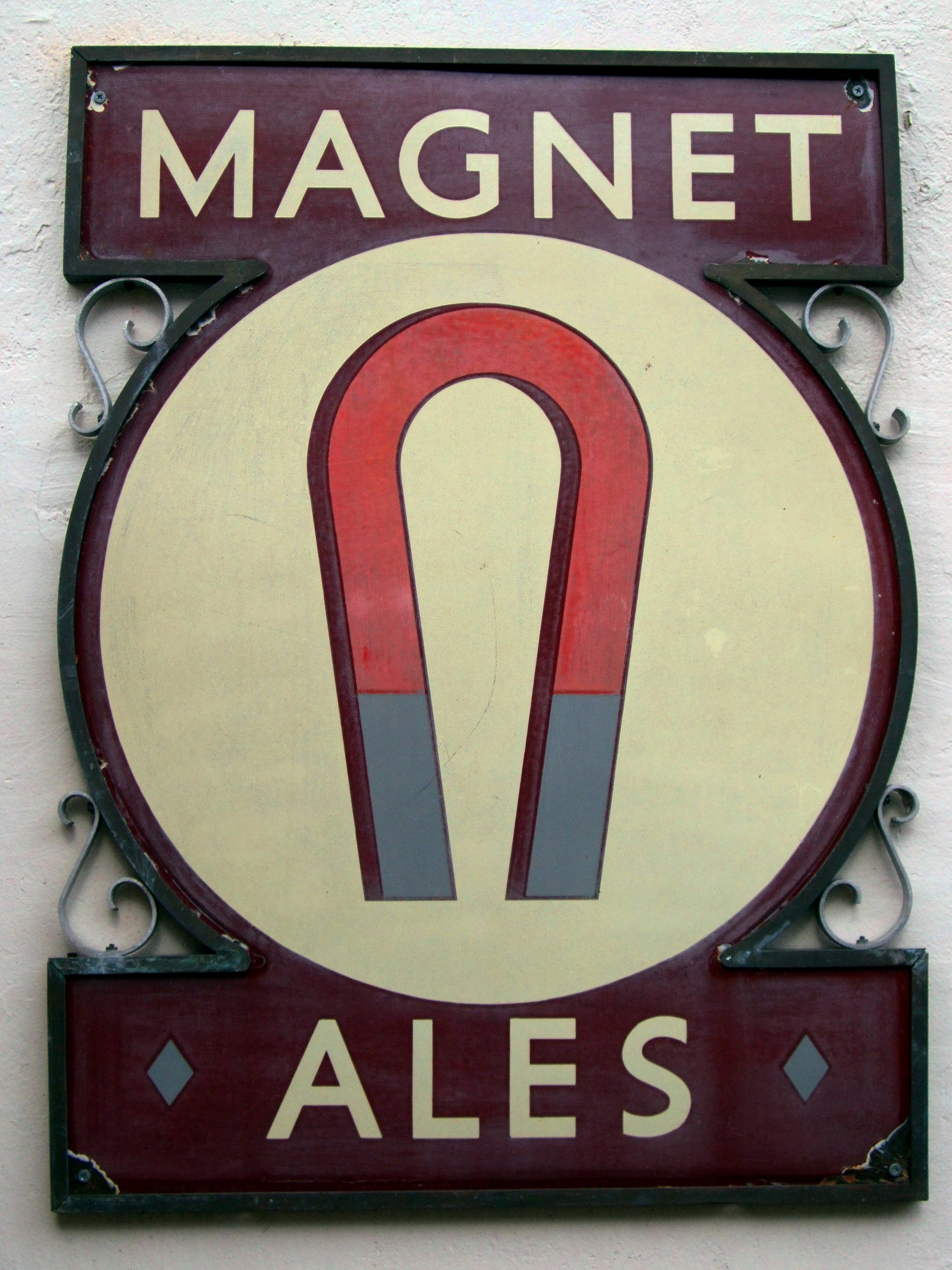
A sign on a pub in London advertises "Magnet Ales"

The Magnet trademark was first registered in September 1908 in Brussels, and symbolised strength.

The company's association with television advertising began in 1971 with the "Yorkshiremen love it" campaign.

An early campaign used a series of parodies of Jona Lewie's "Stop the Cavalry" generally extolling "yer mate called Smith."

This was followed by the "Big John" campaign, which ran in the North of England from 1981, and centred around a re-writing of the Big Bad John country music staple. Courage was able to demonstrate to an independent panel that the £300,000 campaign had resulted in a £5 million sales increase in the North.

From 1979 to 1986 Gordon Rollings played the dour Yorkshireman Arkwright in a campaign that was only used in the South. John Webster, executive creative director at the agency Boase Massimi Pollitt, drew inspiration from the Yorkshire humour in the series I Didn't Know You Cared, and noted the "whole campaign was shot very simply because the idea was it was a very straightforward pint of beer: flat cap, Yorkshireman, down to earth, pragmatic". The campaign won a large number of advertising industry awards, and was featured on The Tonight Show Starring Johnny Carson. Broadcaster John Peel named the adverts "some of the best and funniest ever produced". After Rollings died in 1986 the campaign was continued with Arkwright's successor, Barraclough, until 1991. Despite its success, the campaign was not without detractors, with Deyan Sudjic describing it in The Times as a "spurious ... tripe-and-whippets campaign".

=== No Nonsense campaigns ===
From 1992 until 1997, comedian Jack Dee starred in the "No Nonsense" campaign, created by DDB. The Dee campaign was widely credited with helping John Smith's rise from sixteenth to fourth highest selling beer in the UK as sales increased by 65 per cent, and the brand overtook Tetley's as the highest selling ale brand in the world by 1995. The Dee campaign won fifty advertising awards, and helped to turn the rising comedian into a household name.

Dee resigned in 1997, and he was replaced in 1998 with a cardboard cut-out known as the "No Nonsense Man", from the GGT advertising agency. Despite appearing in over 20,000 pubs, clubs and shops, No Nonsense Man was found to have less of an impact than the Dee advertisements.

Peter Kay represented the brand from 2002 to 2005 and again in 2010–11. The Kay campaign was described as an "advertising phenomenon", and introduced the phrase "Ave it!" into the public consciousness. Between 2002 and 2004 the Kay advertisements won over fifty advertising and marketing awards, making it the sixth most awarded advertising campaign in the world. One advert from the series, Ball Skills (2002), was voted into 17th place in the ITV1 programme Ad of the Decade. Despite the success of the Kay campaign, the perceived "laddishness" of the advertisements were criticised by rival brewer Interbrew as hindering sales of beer among women.

=== Sponsorship ===
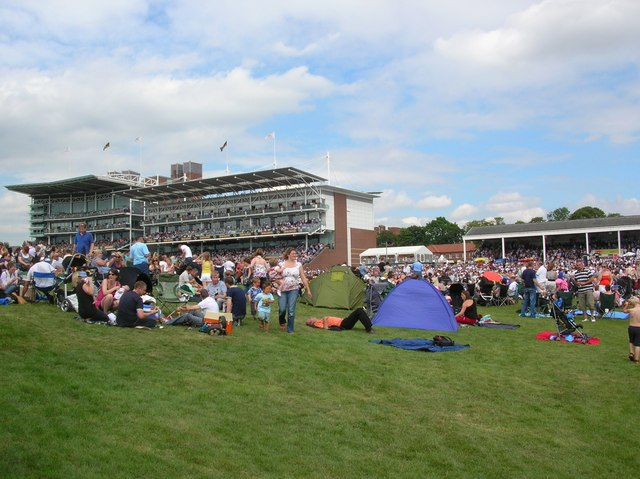
John Smith's Day at York Racecourse in 2009.

John Smith's is a major sponsor of horse racing in the United Kingdom. It has sponsored the Northumberland Plate since 2003, and more than 90 "No Nonsense" race days are held throughout the year at 28 jump and flat racecourses across the UK. The brand has sponsored the John Smith's Cup (originally the Magnet Cup until 1998) at York since 1960, which is the longest running sponsorship in flat racing in the world. John Smith's previously sponsored the Grand National between 2005 and 2013.

From August 2012 until 2025 John Smith's sponsored the Kirklees Stadium in Huddersfield, home to football team Huddersfield Town and rugby league team Huddersfield Giants, which was renamed "John Smith's Stadium".

== See also ==
- Listed buildings in Tadcaster
