= Pat Beasley (jockey) =

Irish jockey

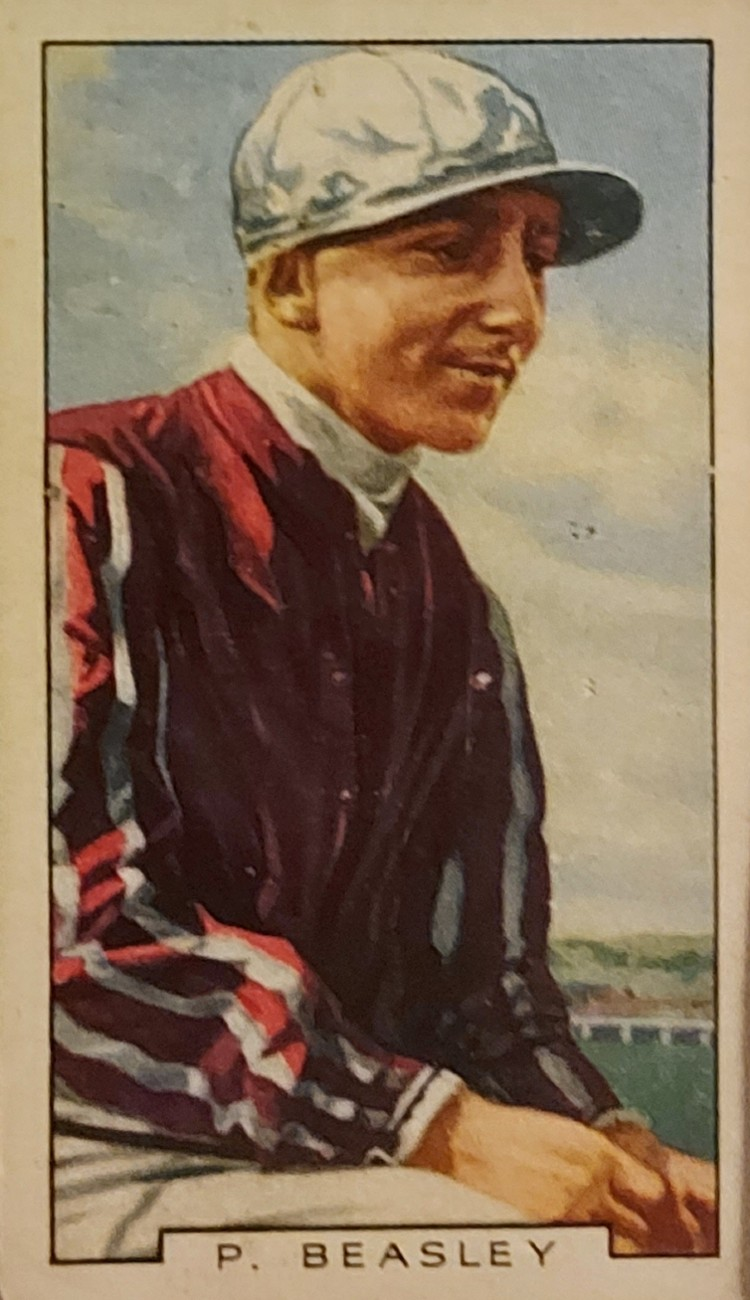
- Pat Beasley in the colours of Mr P Dunne, from a Gallaher's cigarette card, 1936

Personal information
- Born: 9 August 1906
- Died: 6 April 1982 (aged 75)
- Occupations: Jockey and racehorse trainer

Horse racing career
- Sport: Horse racing

Major racing wins
- British Classic Races: St Leger Stakes (1936); Other major British races: Eclipse Stakes (1937); Gold Cup (1937); Champion Stakes (1937); Coronation Cup (1938); Coventry Stakes (1938); Dewhurst Stakes (1938); July Cup (1935, 1936); King's Stand Stakes (1938); Middle Park Stakes (1938, 1940); Nunthorpe Stakes (1936); Prince of Wales's Stakes (1931); St James's Palace Stakes (1930); Irish Classic Races: Irish Oaks (1939); Irish St Leger; Ballyvoy (1927)

Significant horses
- Boswell, Flares, Precipitation
- Updated on 26 October 2023

Pat Beasley (9 August 1906 - 6 April 1982) was an Irish-born, English-based Classic-winning jockey and racehorse trainer.

== Background ==
Patrick Thomas Beasley was born in Ireland on 9 August 1906, the tallest of four jockey sons of Harry, who rode and trained the 1891 Grand National winner Come Away, and finished second in three others. Beasley's father also won a race at Punchestown at the age of 71, and rode his last race aged 83. His uncle Tom also rode three Grand National winners and his nephew Bobby went on to win it on Nicolaus Silver in 1961.

== Riding career ==
Pat, nicknamed Rufus for the colour of his hair, went to school at Ampleforth College in Yorkshire. Although his family had a proud National Hunt racing heritage, he specialised in flat. He had his first ride as an amateur, on General Slaughter, trained by Senator Parkinson, in a Juvenile Stakes at the Curragh on 24 April 1923. That summer he turned professional, as an apprentice to Parkinson. His first winner was Wardley Dell on 25 October 1923 at the Curragh.

After his engagement with Parkinson ended in June 1926, he moved to England to ride for Atty Persse, for whom his brother Harry was stable jockey. His first British winner was Brown Talisman in the Hurst Park Two-Year-Old Stakes on 24 July 1926. His first major success came on Donzelon, trained by Persse, in the 1927 Salisbury Cup, which he would win again two years later on Brown Jack. He also won the 1927 Irish St Leger on Ballyvoy.

He was retained by Jack Joel in 1928. On 13 June 1928, at Newbury, he rode his first English double, winning the Royal Plate on Persse's O'Curry and the Kennet Stakes on Spanish for Richard Dawson. Eight days later, O'Curry have him his first Royal Ascot winner in the Ribblesdale Stakes.

In 1930, he had an opening day treble at Royal Ascot - Bonny Boy II in the Ascot Stakes, Christopher Robin in the St James's Palace Stakes and Atbara in the Queen Mary Stakes. In 1933, he won four in a day at Edinburgh and ended the season with 65 winners. In 1934, this dropped to 40, when jaundice forced him to spend several weeks in a nursing home in Dublin.

He became stable jockey to Bob Colling in Newmarket and won the July Cup for him in 1935 and 1936 on Bellacose. That year, he took over from Joe Childs as first jockey to Cecil Boyd-Rochfort, and entered the most successful phase of his career, winning the 1936 St Leger and 1937 Eclipse on Boswell, the 1937 Gold Cup on Precipitation and the 1937 Champion Stakes on Flares.

In 1938, he won seven in a row on Panorama, including the Champagne Stakes at Doncaster. He also won the Great Jubilee Handicap at Kempton and the Coronation Cup on Monument and ended the season with 71, including five at Royal Ascot. During the war, he volunteered for the RAF, but was invalided out with a suspected duodenal ulcer, and returned to Ireland to recuperate. He finished the war as a 2nd Lieutenant in the Home Guard.

== Training career ==
He briefly returned to riding after the war, winning 8 from 88 in 1945, but struggled with his weight and turned to training, initially from a yard in Norton and then from Wold House in Malton. In his first season, 1946, he trained 12 winners.

He won several major handicaps as a trainer. His biggest were Sterope in the 1948 and 1949 Cambridgeshire and 1949 Royal Hunt Cup, Jupiter in the 1953 Wokingham Handicap and Cambridgeshire, Baron's Folly in the 1957 Queen Anne Stakes, Fougalle in the 1960 Magnet Cup, Harmon in the 1962 Portland Handicap, Gay Casino in the 1963 Thirsk Hunt Cup, Sportsville in the 1967 Zetland Gold Cup and Farm Walk in the 1967 Vaux Gold Tankard and 1968 Magnet Cup.

Bounteous was one of his most successful horses. After winning the 1960 Dewhurst Stakes, he was in the running for the 1961 Derby. He hired a brass band to play by the side of his gallops so that the horse would be used to the fairground noise at Epsom. In the event, the horse was well placed early in the straight, but faded to finish eighth. Later, he would be beaten by less than a length in the St Leger.

Beasley retired in 1974 and published his autobiography, Pillow to Post, in 1981. He died on 6 April 1982.

== Style and reputation ==
He was said to have had "great charm beneath his soft brogue", a "faraway look that suggested absent-mindedness", and a "slight stoop [that] disguised the tough, intelligent rider" that he was.

== Major wins ==
(United Kingdom) Great Britain

- St Leger Stakes - Boswell (1936)
- Eclipse Stakes - Boswell (1937)
- Gold Cup - Precipitation (1937)
- Champion Stakes - Flares (1937)
- Coronation Cup - Monument (1938)
- Coventry Stakes - Panorama (1938)
- Dewhurst Stakes - Casanova (1938)
- July Cup - Bellacose (1935, 1936)
- King's Stand Stakes - Foray (1938)
- Middle Park Stakes - Foxbrough II (1938), Hyacinthus (1940)
- Nunthorpe Stakes - Bellacose (1936)
- Prince of Wales's Stakes - Sir Andrew (1931)
- St James's Palace Stakes - Christopher Robin (1930)

== See also ==
- List of jockeys

== Bibliography ==
- Mortimer, Roger; Onslow, Richard; Willett, Peter (1978). Biographical Encyclopaedia of British Racing. London: Macdonald and Jane's. ISBN 0-354-08536-0.
