= Zetland Gold Cup =

Flat horse race in Britain

Zetland Gold Cup
2019
Al Muffrih	Leroy Leroy	Ventura Knight

Previous years
2018
Big Country	Nicholas	Titus
2017
Briardale	Rainbow Rebel	Euchen Glen
2016
Revolutionist	Central Square	Swift Emperor
2015
Fire Fighting	Yeager	Chancery
2014
Cashpoint	Spa's Dancer	Silvery Moon
2013
Clon Brulee	Eshtibaak	Gabrial The Great
2012
Danadana	Mid Mon Lady	Con Artist
2011
Nanton	Prince Of Johanne	Desert Romance
2010
Forte Dei Marmi	Sweet Lightning	Albaqaa
2009
Kingdom Of Fife	Nanton	Re Barolo
2008
Capable Guest	Fragrancy	Monte Alto
2007
Flipando	Wind Star	Bailieborough
2006
Chantaco	Ace of Hearts	Active Asset
2005
Blue Monday	Divine Gift	Crow Wood
2004
Blue Spinnaker	James Caird	Crow Wood
2003
Hazim	Cat's Whiskers	Crow Wood

The Zetland Gold Cup is a flat Handicap horse race in Great Britain open to horses aged three-year-old and up. It is run at Redcar over a distance of 1 mile 2 furlongs and 1 yard (2,013 metres), and it is scheduled to take place each year at the end of May or beginning of June.

== History ==
The Zetland Handicap was first run in 1946 over a distance of 2 miles. For the following three years it was run over the revised distance of 1 mile, 6 furlongs and 132 yards. From 1950 it was run over a its current distance. The "Gold Cup" element was added to the title in 1952.

== Winners ==
Year	Winner	Age	Weight	Jockey	Trainer	Time
1946	Restive	4	07–07	Percy Evans	Noel Murless	Not taken
1947	Arch Stone	6	07–10	Albert Orme	Bertie Bullock	Not taken
1948	Melody Maker	4	08–13	Bill Evans	Charles Elsey	3:08.20
1949	Melody Maker	5	09–04	Bill Evans	Charles Elsey	3:11.80
1950	Near Way	4	08–04	Billy Nevett	Sam Hall	2:08.20
1951	Socrates	4	07–13	Billy Nevett	Matthew J Peacock	2:11.80
1952	Mid View	5	07–10	John Bunker	Harold Wallington	2:05.80
1953	H.V.C.	4	08–07	Ken Gethin	John Bisgood	2:04.20
1954	Prince D'Or	5	07–13	Bill Elliott	Derrick Candy	2:06.40
1955	Blue Prince II	4	08–10	Harry Carr	Cecil Boyd-Rochfort	2:05.60
1956	Tale Of Two Cities	5	07–08	Walter Bentley	Jack Fawcus	2:02.40
1957	Sunrise	4	07–01	Greville Starkey	George Boyd	2:06.00
1958	Cash And Courage	5	08–02	Michael Hayes	Sam Hall	2:11.60
1959	Maddalo	4	08–00	Brian Jago	Peter Thrale	2:04.00
1960	Hard And Soft	5	08–04	Alec Russell	Tommy Dent	2:05.60
1961	Beau Rossa	5	08–10	Joe Sime	Sam Hall	2:06.60
1962	Henry The Seventh	4	09–10	Eddie Hide	Bill Elsey	2:07.00
1963	Principal	4	09–04	Michael Hayes	Frank Armstrong	2:08.00
1964	Red Tears	4	08–11	Joe Mercer	Dick Hern	2:08.80
1965	Dark Court	4	08–02	Scobie Breasley	Sir Gordon Richards	2:05.20
1966	Preclusion	4	07–13	Joe Sime	Sam Hall	2:05.40
1967	Sportaville	5	07–08	Peter Hetherington	Rufus Beasley	2:10.40
1968	Castle Yard	5	08–04	Stan Smith	Cecil Boyd-Rochfort	2:05.00
1969	Brother Scot	3	08–01	Johnny Greenaway	Bill Elsey	Not taken
1970	Foggy Bell	5	08–07	Willie McCaskill	Denys Smith	2:05.40
1971	Lady Lowndes	4	07–12	Ernie Johnson	Sam Hall	2:11.00
1972	Happy Hunter	5	08–04	Johnny Seagrave	Denys Smith	2:10.60
1973	Peleid	3	07–12	Ernie Johnson	Bill Elsey	2:15.60
1974	Owenboliska	4	08–10	Robert Edmondson	Paul Cole	2:05.40
1975	Record Run	4	09–08	Ian Johnson	Gavin Pritchard-Gordon	2:07.20
1976	Move Off	3	07-07	Ray Still	Jack Calvert	2:08.10
1977	Move Off	4	09–07	Eddie Hide	Jack Calvert	2:08.00
1978	Abercata	5	07-07	Richard Fox	James Bethell	2:03.40
1979	Abandoned due to waterlogging
1980	Side Track	4	08–02	George Duffield	Gavin Pritchard-Gordon	2:07.10
1981 (Note: The 1981 running was over a mile (round course not in use).)	Silly Prices	4	08–02	Kevin Hodgson	Peter Easterby	1:37.70
1982	Say Primula	4	10–05	Eddie Hide	Bill Watts	2:06.00
1983	Free Press	4	07–11	Joey Brown	Ian Balding	2:11.10
1984	Miramar Reef	5	09–05	Richard Fox	Clive Brittain	2:05.70
1985	K-Battery	4	08–13	Nicky Connorton	Bill Elsey	2:10.10
1986	Forward Rally	4	08–00	George Duffield	Sir Mark Prescott	2:04.60
1987	Knockando	3	08–08	Ray Cochrane	Luca Cumani	2:04.10
1988	Fridu	3	08–04	Ray Cochrane	Luca Cumani	2:03.30
1989	Inaad	5	09–03	Richard Hills	Harry Thomson Jones	2:01.50
1990	Eradicate	5	09–02	Billy Newnes	Peter Calver	2:01.40
1991	Nayland	5	09–11	George Duffield	Geoff Wragg	2:07.30
1992	Rose Alto	4	09–00	George Duffield	James Fanshawe	2:04.70
1993	River North	3	08–01	Kevin Darley	Lady Herries	2:05.00
1994	Wainwright	5	09–11	Gary Hind	John Gosden	2:05.40
1995	Penny A Day	5	09–10	Kevin Darley	Mary Reveley	2:04.10
1996	Migwar	3	08–05	Kieren Fallon	Luca Cumani	2:05.50
1997	Champagne Prince	4	08–09	Carl Lowther	Peter Harris	2:06.00
1998	Shadoof	4	08–02	Martin Dwyer	Willie Muir	2:06.10
1999	Colway Ritz	5	08–02	Andrew Mullen	Wilf Storey	2:03.30
2000	Nobelist	5	09–09	Ted Durcan	Clive Brittain	2:09.30
2001	The Whistling Teal	5	09–01	John Carroll	Geoff Wragg	2:04.00
2002	Flight Sequence	6	09–04	George Duffield	Lady Herries	2:03.00
2003	Hazim	4	09–11	Willie Supple	Sir Michael Stoute	2:02.97
2004	Blue Spinnaker	5	09–07	Paul Mulrennan	Mick Easterby	2:04.13
2005	Blue Monday	4	09–00	Steve Drowne	Roger Charlton	2:04.03
2006	Chantaco	4	09–00	Martin Dwyer	Andrew Balding	2:05.19
2007	Flipando	6	09–03	Paul Fessey	David Barron	2:05.82
2008	Capable Guest	6	08–12	Joe Fanning	Mick Channon	2:06.75
2009	My Kingdom Of Fife	4	09–00	Ryan Moore	Sir Michael Stoute	2:03.30
2010	Forte Dei Marmi	4	09–03	Jean-Pierre Guillambert	Luca Cumani	2:04.75
2011	Nanton	9	09–08	Daniel Tudhope	Jim Goldie	2:03.68
2012	Danadana	4	09–04	Kieren Fallon	Luca Cumani	2:07.29
2013	Clon Brulee	4	09–01	Graham Gibbons	David Barron	2:03.50
2014	Cashpoint	9	08–09	Shane Gray	Ian Williams	2:08.96
2015	Fire Fighting	4	10–00	Paul Mulrennan	Mark Johnston	2:03.93
2016	Revolutionist	4	09–10	Joe Fanning	Mark Johnston	2:04.23
2017	Briardale	5	09–02	Paul Hanagan	James Bethell	2:03.72
2018	Big Country	5	10–00	Silvestre de Sousa	Michael Appleby	2:04.32
2019	Al Muffrih	4	08–12	Daniel Tudhope	William Haggas	2:02.28
	no race 2020 (Note: The 2020 running was cancelled because of the COVID-19 pandemic in the United Kingdom)
2021	Good Birthday	5	08–07	Silvestre de Sousa	Andrew Balding	2:04.45
2022	Forest Falcon	4	09–00	Joe Fanning	Charlie and Mark Johnston	2:04.68
2023	Oviedo	3	08–11	Callum Rodriguez	Edward Bethell	2:05.55
2024	Arthur's Realm	6	09–06	Oisin Orr	Ed Dunlop	2:11.61
2025	Liberty Coach	4	09–07	Jason Hart	John and Sean Quinn	2:02.20
2026	Danger Bay	4	09–13	Callum Rodriguez	Edward Bethell	2:01:64

== See also ==
- Horse racing in Great Britain
- List of British flat horse races
