= Tommy Carey =

English jockey

Personal information
- Occupation: Jockey

Horse racing career
- Sport: Horse racing

Major racing wins
- Major race wins: Derby Stakes (1943); Middle Park Stakes (1943); Dewhurst Stakes (1941)

Significant horses
- Canyonero, Orestes, Straight Deal

Tommy Carey (7 September 1905 – 24 March 1964) was a Derby winning flat racing jockey.

He was born Thomas Henry Carey in 1905. He started out as apprentice to Stanley Wootton, but initially failed to progress. However, while pony racing at Northolt he came to the attention of leading owner Dorothy Paget and the partnership with her became relatively successful.

His greatest success came for Paget on Straight Deal in the 1943 Derby, run at Newmarket because of the war. Carey was said to have ridden a "patient and well-judged" race on the horse, who started at odds of 100/6. Other big wins came on the two-year-olds Canyonero in the 1941 Dewhurst Stakes and Orestes in the 1943 Middle Park Stakes. He also won two wartime Stewards Cups on Sugar Palm. At Windsor in 1943, on the day that Gordon Richards broke Fred Archer's records for the most ever victories, Carey rode five winners, with another coming second.

He retired from race-riding at the end of the 1946 flat season, alongside fellow jockeys Harry Wragg and Bobby Jones. A dinner was held in their honour, hosted by champion jockey Gordon Richards. Carey then became a trainer at Epsom. He won with both his first flat and hurdles runners.

He trained Le Sage to win the 1951 Sussex Stakes and Oxfordshire Stakes and Castleton to win the 1952 King Edward VII Stakes and Blue Riband Stakes. Further success came in the 1954 Triumph Hurdle at Hurst Park with Prince Charlemagne, ridden by Lester Piggott. He also trained for the Maharajah of Baroda, although the Maharajah's retained rider Charlie Smirke chose to end the partnership rather than take orders from Carey.

Carey later moved to train at Godalming, but died in hospital in Epsom in 1964 following a barbiturate overdose.

== Major wins ==
(United Kingdom) Great Britain

- Derby Stakes – Straight Deal (1943)
- Middle Park Stakes – Orestes (1943)
- Dewhurst Stakes – Canyonero (1941)

== See also ==
- List of jockeys

== Bibliography ==
- Mortimer, Roger; Onslow, Richard; Willett, Peter (1978). Biographical Encyclopaedia of British Racing. London: Macdonald and Jane's. ISBN 0-354-08536-0.
