= Martin Lane (jockey) =

Irish jockey (born 1985)

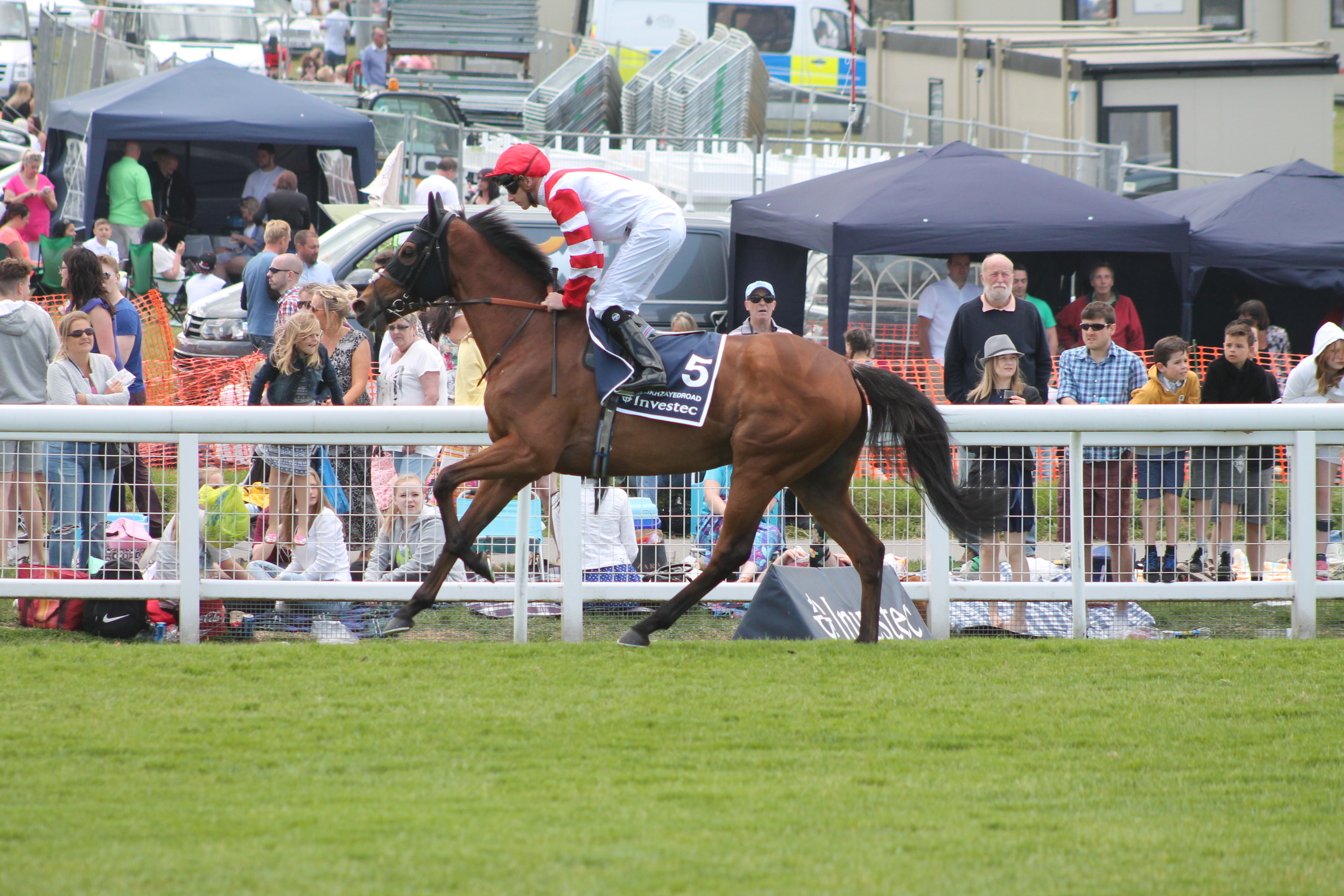
- Lane riding Sheikhzayedroad at Epsom Downs, 2015

Personal information
- Nationality: (Republic of Ireland) Irish
- Born: 10 October 1985 (age 40) Kilworth, North Cork, Ireland

Horse racing career
- Sport: Horse racing
- Career winnings: £1,832,032 €80,017 $191,640; 565,756 AED
- Career wins: 321

Major racing wins
- Northern Dancer Turf Stakes (2014)

Racing awards
- 2010 Champion Apprentice Jockey (UK)

Significant horses
- Sheikhzayedroad

Martin Lane (born 10 October 1985) is a retired flat racing jockey from Ireland. He now lives and works in Fiji.

== Career ==
Martin Lane was born in [Kilworth], County Cork, Ireland. After riding in Ireland, Lane moved to the United Kingdom and rode primarily for Newmarket based trainer David Simcock. In 2010, he secured 41 wins on his way to the British Champion Apprentice title. Notably, taking victory in the John Smith's Cup at York.

It would not be until 2013 that Lane scored another notable big race win, this time with the Tattersalls Millions 2YO Fillies' Trophy at Newmarket, riding Wedding Ring in the colours of Godolphin. In 2014, with Simcock, Lane would team up with Sheikhzayedroad and owned Mohammed Jaber. Scoring notable wins during the 2014 season including the Fred Archer Stakes and York Stakes before heading to Canada and taking victory in the 2014 Grade I Northern Dancer Turf Stakes at Woodbine.

Lane announced his retirement following a meeting at Chelmsford City Racecourse in December 2017. He had just ridden a winner for Godolphin at the track. Following his retirement, Lane moved to Fiji to work in an operations manager role for a resort.

== Major wins ==
Canada

- Northern Dancer Turf Stakes - Sheikhzayedroad (2014)
