= Racing Academy and Centre of Education =

Coordinates: 53.155488°N 6.88484453°W

The Racing Academy and Centre of Education (RACE) is a training academy and registered charity in Kildare, Ireland, which offers courses for jockeys and others involved in horseracing. Until 2023, RACE ran a 42-week residential course for aspiring jockeys and stable staff. Graduates of the course include Johnny Murtagh, Seamie Heffernan, Chris Hayes, Cathy Gannon, Daryl Jacob and Brian Hughes. In 2023 the academy was forced to close its residential blocks for safety reasons. As of 2025, RACE offers a six-week jockey preparation course (followed by a six-week placement with a trainer), as well as courses in equine nutrition, transport, schooling and administration. All courses are non-residential. There are also junior academy days.

The Irish School of Farriery run by the Irish Farriery Authority is located in a purpose-built building on the RACE campus, and several other organisations involved in the equine sector are also based there.

RACE is funded (as of 2023) by the Horse Racing Ireland (HRI), the Kildare-Wicklow Education Training Board, and a percentage of racing prize money.

== History ==
RACE is situated on what was once the Tully estate of thoroughbred-breeder and politician William Hall-Walker. Curragh House, the administrative centre of the academy, was the home to the family of Japanese landscape gardener Tassa Eida, while he was creating a Japanese garden for Hall-Walker. In 1916, Hall-Walker presented the estate to the British Government; it was acquired by the Irish Government in 1943 and became the Irish National Stud.

The academy was founded in 1973 by veterinarian Stanley Cosgrove and others, including Derek O'Sullivan, who became its first director, in response to concern about the working conditions of apprentice jockeys and stable staff. Classrooms, gyms, lecture halls, an indoor riding school and facilities for a string of retired racehorses were added to the buildings.

In 2023, as RACE marked its fiftieth anniversary, financial problems emerged and its residential buildings were closed over safety issues. HRI put an interim chief executive, Darren Lawlor, in place. Twenty-one of the thirty-one staff at the academy lost their jobs.
