= Cantelo =

British Thoroughbred racehorse

- Sire: Chanteur
- Grandsire: Chateau Bouscaut
- Dam: Rustic Bridge
- Damsire: Bois Roussel
- Sex: Mare
- Foaled: 1956
- Country: United Kingdom
- Colour: Bay
- Breeder: William Hill
- Owner: William Hill
- Trainer: Charles Elsey
- Record: 11:8-2-0
- Earnings: £40,625

Major wins
- Royal Lodge Stakes (1958); Cheshire Oaks (1959); Ribblesdale Stakes (1959); St. Leger Stakes (1959)

Cantelo (foaled 1956) was a British Thoroughbred racehorse and broodmare. In a career which lasted from spring 1958 until September 1959 she ran eleven times and won eight races. Cantelo was unbeaten in five races as a two-year-old including the Royal Lodge Stakes, in which she defeated colts. As a three-year-old in 1959 she won the Classic St Leger, as well as the Cheshire Oaks and the Ribblesdale Stakes. Her defeats came when finishing second in The Oaks (to Petite Etoile) and the Park Hill Stakes and running fourth to Alcide in the King George VI and Queen Elizabeth Stakes. She was retired from racing after her St Leger win and had some success as a broodmare.

== Background ==
Cantelo was a bay filly bred by her owner, the bookmaker William Hill. She was sired by the French-bred Coronation Cup winner Chanteur, out of an unsuccessful racemare named Rustic Bridge. As a descendant of the broodmare Footlight, Cantelo was a member of Thoroughbred family 1-m, which also produced Ahonoora and Musidora.

Hill sent his filly into training with Captain Charles Elsey at his Highfield stables at Malton in Yorkshire. Cantelo was ridden in her major races by Edward Hide.

== Racing career ==
=== 1958: two-year-old season ===
Cantelo won all five of her races in 1958. She won the six furlong Fenwolf Stakes at Ascot Racecourse. In September she returned to Ascot for the Royal Lodge Stakes over one mile, in which she was matched against a field of colts. Cantelo gave a lot of trouble before the start and delayed the race for some time. She won from Last Line and Pindari, a colt who went on to win the King Edward VII Stakes and the Great Voltigeur Stakes in 1959. In the Free Handicap, a ranking of the season's best British two-year-olds, she was given a weight of 121 pounds, twelve pounds behind the top-weight Tudor Melody and seven pounds below the top fillies Rosalba and Lindsay.

=== 1959: three-year-old season ===
Cantelo began her three-year-old season in the Cheshire Oaks at Chester Racecourse in May. She won the race, a recognised trial for The Oaks by six lengths from Anthelion.

In the Oaks at Epsom Downs Racecourse, Cantelo was matched against the 1000 Guineas winner Petite Etoile. Cantelo was made favourite ahead of Petite Etoile, whose pedigree had led to doubts regarding her stamina over one and a half miles. Cantelo led the race in the straight but was overtaken by Petite Etoile a furlong from the finish and was beaten three lengths into second place. Two weeks after her Oaks defeat, Cantelo was sent to Royal Ascot for the Ribblesdale Stakes which she won comfortably from the Prix des Lilas winner La Coquenne. A month later, Cantelo returned to Ascot for Britain's most valuable and prestigious all-aged race, the King George VI and Queen Elizabeth Stakes. She finished fourth of the eleven runners behind the 2/1 favourite Alcide, a four-year-old colt.

Cantelo was then trained for the St Leger Stakes at Doncaster in September. The gallops at Malton were unusually hard that summer, and Elsey struggled to get the filly in top condition. He therefore decided to complete her preparation by running her in the Park Hill Stakes for fillies at Doncaster, two days before the St Leger. Cantelo appeared likely to win easily in the straight, but was caught in the closing stages and was beaten by the 33/1 outsider Collyria. In the St Leger, Cantelo started at odds of 100/7 in field of eleven, with The Derby winner Parthia being made the odds-on favourite. Hide sent Cantelo into the lead in the straight and she won by one and a half lengths from the Irish Derby winner Fidalgo, with Pindari taking third ahead of Parthia. She was the first Yorkshire-trained winner of the race since Apology in 1874, but was given a hostile reception by some racegoers who felt aggrieved by the abrupt improvement in the filly's form since the Park Hill Stakes.

== Assessment ==
In their book A Century of Champions, John Randall and Tony Morris rated Cantelo an "average" St Leger winner and the fiftieth best filly or mare of the 20th century trained in Britain or Ireland.

Cantelo was given a rating of 129 Timeform in 1959.

== Stud career ==
Cantelo was retired to her owner's stud. She was not a great success as a broodmare but did produce one good horse in Cambridge (sired by Saint Crespin) who won the Blue Riband Trial Stakes at Epsom in 1965 and later stood as a stallion in Florida.

== Pedigree ==
Pedigree of Cantelo (GB), bay mare, 1956
Sire Chanteur (FR)	Chateau Bouscaut (FR)	Kircubbin	Captivation
Sire Chanteur (FR)	Chateau Bouscaut (FR)	Kircubbin	Avon Hack
Sire Chanteur (FR)	Chateau Bouscaut (FR)	Ramondie	Neil Gow
Sire Chanteur (FR)	Chateau Bouscaut (FR)	Ramondie	La Rille
Sire Chanteur (FR)	La Diva (FR)	Blue Skies	Blandford
Sire Chanteur (FR)	La Diva (FR)	Blue Skies	Blue Pill
Sire Chanteur (FR)	La Diva (FR)	La Traviata	Alcantara
Sire Chanteur (FR)	La Diva (FR)	La Traviata	Tregaron
Dam Rustic Bridge (GB)	Bois Roussel (FR)	Vatout	Prince Chimay
Dam Rustic Bridge (GB)	Bois Roussel (FR)	Vatout	Vashti
Dam Rustic Bridge (GB)	Bois Roussel (FR)	Plucky Liege	Spearmint
Dam Rustic Bridge (GB)	Bois Roussel (FR)	Plucky Liege	Concertina
Dam Rustic Bridge (GB)	Wyn (GB)	Winalot	Son-in-Law
Dam Rustic Bridge (GB)	Wyn (GB)	Winalot	Gallenza
Dam Rustic Bridge (GB)	Wyn (GB)	Bon Mot	Beresford
Dam Rustic Bridge (GB)	Wyn (GB)	Bon Mot	Happy Climax (Family 1-m)
