= Bill Elsey =

British racehorse trainer (1921–2019)

Charles William Carlton Elsey (8 December 1921 – 2 January 2019) was a British horse trainer who trained horses competing in both Flat racing and National Hunt racing.

== Early life ==
In a career lasting from 1961 to 1996 he trained 885 winners, and won two British Classic Races with Pia in the 1967 Epsom Oaks and Peleid in the 1973 St Leger Stakes.
