= Altesse Royale =

British-bred Thoroughbred racehorse

- Racing silks of Roger Hue-Williams
- Sire: Saint Crespin
- Grandsire: Aureole
- Dam: Bleu Azur
- Damsire: Crepello
- Sex: Mare
- Foaled: 1968
- Country: United Kingdom
- Colour: Chestnut
- Breeder: Vera Hue-Williams
- Owner: Roger Hue-Williams
- Trainer: Noel Murless
- Record: 5: 4-1-0

Major wins
- 1000 Guineas (1971); Epsom Oaks (1971); Irish Oaks (1971)

Honours
- Timeform rating: 126

Altesse Royale (foaled 1968) was a British Thoroughbred racehorse. In a brief racing career, lasting from October 1970 until September 1971 she ran five times and won four races. In 1971 she won the 1000 Guineas at Newmarket, the Oaks at Epsom and the Irish Oaks at the Curragh. Altesse Royale was injured and retired from racing later that year. She made no impact as a broodmare.

== Background ==
Altesse Royal was tall, lightly-built chestnut filly with a narrow white blaze and white socks on her hind feet. She was bred by Vera Hue-Williams and raced in the colours of her husband Roger Hue-Williams. She was sired by Saint Crespin, a half-brother of Tulyar, who won the Prix de l'Arc de Triomphe in 1959. Her dam, Bleu Azur won two minor races and was a half-sister to the Champion Hurdler Magic Court. Bleu Azur had previously produced the Fred Darling Stakes winner Royal Saint. As a descendant of the broodmare Rose Red, Altesse Royale was a product of the same branch of Thoroughbred Family 1-w, which produced Alycidon, Festoon, Celtic Ash and Larkspur.

Altesse Royale was sent into training with Noel Murless at his Warren Place stables at Newmarket, Suffolk.

== Racing career ==
Altesse Royale was slow to mature, and Murless ran her only once. In October she won a maiden race over six furlongs at Lingfield Park.

On her three-year-old debut, Altesse Royale was moved up to Group Three class for the Nell Gwyn Stakes, a recognised trial race for the 1000 Guineas run over seven furlongs at Newmarket. She finished second to Super Honey, carrying four pounds less than the winner. She was not regarded as a leading contender for the Classic at Newmarket, and Murless's stable jockey, Geoff Lewis, elected to ride the Cheveley Park Stakes winner Magic Flute. Ridden by the leading French jockey Yves Saint-Martin, Altesse Royale started at 25/1 in a field of ten fillies. She took the lead from the start and was never seriously challenged, winning by one and a half lengths from Super Honey with Catherine Wheel third and Magic Flute fourth. Her win gave Murless a fifth success in the race, setting a 20th-century record.

Geoff Lewis reclaimed the ride on Altesse Royale when she ran in the Epsom Oaks a month later. She started 6/4 favourite despite some doubts about her stamina: her sister Royal Saint had apparently failed to stay one and a half miles when she was the beaten favourite for the race in 1967. Lewis sent Altesse Royale past her stable companion Maina to take the lead in the straight and the filly drew clear to win by three lengths. the win gave Lewis a notable double, as he had won the Derby on Mill Reef three days earlier. In July she was sent to Ireland to contest the Irish Oaks at the Curragh. She won, but was not impressive in beating the French-trained filly Vincennes by half a length.

Altesse Royale was being prepared for a run in the Prix Vermeille at Longchamp in September when she sustained an injury in training and was retired to stud.

== Retirement ==
Altesse Royale was retired to her owners' Rathasker Stud in County Kildare, Ireland. She was bred to stallions including Mill Reef, Brigadier Gerard, Dancer's Image and Known Fact, but produced no winners of note.

== Assessment and honours ==
Altesse Royale was given a rating of 126 by Timeform.

In their book, A Century of Champions, based on the Timeform rating system, John Randall and Tony Morris rated Altesse Royale an "average" winner of the 1000 Guineas and Oaks.

== Pedigree ==
Pedigree of Altesse Royale (GB), chestnut mare, 1968
Sire Saint Crespin (IRE) 1956	Aureole; 1950	Hyperion	Gainsborough
Sire Saint Crespin (IRE) 1956	Aureole; 1950	Hyperion	Selene
Sire Saint Crespin (IRE) 1956	Aureole; 1950	Angelola	Donatello
Sire Saint Crespin (IRE) 1956	Aureole; 1950	Angelola	Feola
Sire Saint Crespin (IRE) 1956	Neocracy; 1944	Nearco	Pharos
Sire Saint Crespin (IRE) 1956	Neocracy; 1944	Nearco	Nogara
Sire Saint Crespin (IRE) 1956	Neocracy; 1944	Harina	Blandford
Sire Saint Crespin (IRE) 1956	Neocracy; 1944	Harina	Athasi
Dam Bleu Azur (GB) 1959	Crepello; 1954	Donatello	Blenheim
Dam Bleu Azur (GB) 1959	Crepello; 1954	Donatello	Delleana
Dam Bleu Azur (GB) 1959	Crepello; 1954	Crepuscule	Mieuxce
Dam Bleu Azur (GB) 1959	Crepello; 1954	Crepuscule	Red Sunset
Dam Bleu Azur (GB) 1959	Blue Prelude; 1951	Blue Peter	Fairway
Dam Bleu Azur (GB) 1959	Blue Prelude; 1951	Blue Peter	Fancy Free
Dam Bleu Azur (GB) 1959	Blue Prelude; 1951	Keyboard	Bois Roussel
Dam Bleu Azur (GB) 1959	Blue Prelude; 1951	Keyboard	Keystone (Family: 1-w)

Altesse Royale was inbred 3 × 4 to Donatello, meaning that this stallion appears in both the third and fourth generations of her pedigree.
