= Ridge Wood =

British Thoroughbred racehorse

- Sire: Bois Roussel
- Grandsire: Vatout
- Dam: Hanging Fall
- Damsire: Solario
- Sex: Stallion
- Foaled: 1946
- Country: United Kingdom
- Colour: Bay or Brown
- Breeder: Sledmere Stud
- Owner: Geoffrey Smith
- Trainer: Noel Murless
- Record: 12: 7-1-2
- Earnings: £21,658

Major wins
- Oxfordshire Stakes (1949); St Leger Stakes (1949)

Awards
- Timeform rating 124

Ridge Wood (1946–1956) was a British Thoroughbred racehorse best known for winning the classic St Leger Stakes in 1949. The colt was rejected by his prospective owner as a yearling and failed to win as a two-year-old in 1948. Even after winning five of his first six races as a three-year-old he was not regarded as a top-class performer even by his trainer, who only ran him in the St Leger when a more fancied stable companion was injured. After winning the Leger as a 14/1 outsider, Ridge Wood was defeated in his only subsequent start and was retired to stud, where he was a failure as a breeding stallion. He died at the age of ten in 1956.

== Background ==
Ridge Wood was a dark bay or brown horse with one white foot bred by the Sledmere Stud of Driffield, East Yorkshire. He was sired by Bois Roussel, a French-bred horse who won the 1938 Epsom Derby before becoming a successful breeding stallion. His other progeny included the St Leger winner Tehran and the Prix de l'Arc de Triomphe winner Migoli. Ridge Wood's dam Hanging Fall was not a successful racehorse but came from a good family, being a great-granddaughter of the influential broodmare Dinner. Other direct descendants of Dinner have included High Top, Old Vic, Four Course (1000 Guineas) and Acatenango.

As yearling he was offered for sale at Doncaster where he was bought for 4,000 guineas by the trainer Noel Murless. Murless offered the colt to his patron Lord Feversham who rejected him in favour of a more expensive colt by Nearco later named Krakatao. The option to buy Ridge Wood was taken up by Geoffrey Smith and the colt was sent into training with Murless at Hambleton in Yorkshire.

== Racing career ==
=== 1948: two-year-old season ===
In 1948, Murless moved his string of racehorses, including Ridge Wood, to Beckhampton in Wiltshire and won the first of his nine trainers' championships. His major winners included the 1000 Guineas winner Queenpot and the top-rated two-year-old Abernant, whilst Ridge Wood made little impact, managing one second (in the Soltykoff Stakes at Newmarket) and one third place from three starts.

=== 1949: three-year-old season ===
Ridge Wood showed improved form on his three-year-old debut, winning the Tudor Stakes at Sandown Park Racecourse. He then started 11/8 favourite for the Classic Trial Stakes at Kempton Park but finished fourth behind Summertime.

Ridge Wood began his winning run in the City of Birmingham Cup at Birmingham Racecourse and then won the Sandringham Stakes and the Commonwealth Stakes, both at Sandown. The colt then returned to Birmingham on 8 August for the Midlands St Leger Trial in which his only rival was a colt named Courier. Murless had instructed champion jockey Gordon Richards not to make the running on Ridge Wood, but Courier's rider had been given identical instructions, and when race was started, both refused to begin racing. When the racecourse starter's assistant brandished a large whip behind the horses the "contest" began at a walk and continued as a "tortoise race" for six furlongs with the crowd loudly voicing their disapproval. The race eventually began in earnest, and Ridge Wood recorded his fourth consecutive win by three lengths. On his final start before the St Leger, Ridge Wood was moved up in class and won the Oxfordshire Stakes over thirteen furlongs at Newbury. In this race he was ridden again by the champion jockey Gordon Richards and won at odds of 4/9.

At Doncaster on 10 September Ridge Wood was one of sixteen three-year-olds to contest the 173rd running of the St Leger. Murless had not thought the colt good enough to contest the Derby, and only decided to run him in the Leger when another of his stables runners, Royal Forest, was withdrawn from the race after being injured. Richards chose to ride Murless's more-fancied runner Krakatao (winner of the one mile Sussex Stakes) and the ride on Ridge Wood was taken by the fifty-three-year-old Irish jockey Michael Beary. Other contenders included the leading filly Musidora, the French challenger Marveil and the favourite Swallow Tail (third in the Derby). The race was run in brilliant sunshine and attracted what was described as an "enormous" crowd to the Yorkshire course. Starting at odds of 100/7 (just over 14/1), Ridge Wood won the classic by three lengths from Dust Devil, with the American-bred Lone Eagle three-quarters of a length away in third.

Ridge Wood's last race was the King George VI Stakes over two miles at Ascot Racecourse in October. In its brief existence, this race had attracted some of the best staying three-year-olds in Europe, with the three previous runnings having been won by Souverain, Arbar and Alycidon. Ridge Wood started favourite but finished third behind Marveil and Lone Eagle.

== Assessment ==
The independent Timeform organisation gave Ridge Wood a rating of 124 in 1949, fourteen pounds below the top-rated three-year-old Abernant. In their book A Century of Champions, based on a modified version of the Timeform system, John Randall and Tony Morris rated Ridge Wood as a “poor” St Leger winner.

== Stud career ==
Ridge Wood was retired from racing to become a breeding stallion but was a complete failure at stud. He sired no winners of any importance and died of "chronic toxic poisoning" in 1956. His only impact came through his daughter Tekka, who produced Garvey Girl, the dam of two fast horses in Hot Spark (Flying Childers Stakes) and Bitty Girl (Queen Mary Stakes), Molecomb Stakes, Lowther Stakes).

== Pedigree ==
Pedigree of Ridge Wood (GB), bay stallion, 1946
Sire Bois Roussel (FR) 1935	Vatout (FR); 1926	Prince Chimay	Chaucer*
Sire Bois Roussel (FR) 1935	Vatout (FR); 1926	Prince Chimay	Gallorette
Sire Bois Roussel (FR) 1935	Vatout (FR); 1926	Vashti	Sans Souci
Sire Bois Roussel (FR) 1935	Vatout (FR); 1926	Vashti	Vaya
Sire Bois Roussel (FR) 1935	Plucky Liege (GB); 1912	Spearmint	Carbine
Sire Bois Roussel (FR) 1935	Plucky Liege (GB); 1912	Spearmint	Maid of the Mint
Sire Bois Roussel (FR) 1935	Plucky Liege (GB); 1912	Concertina	St Simon*
Sire Bois Roussel (FR) 1935	Plucky Liege (GB); 1912	Concertina	Comic Song
Dam Hanging Fall (GB) 1940	Solario (IRE); 1922	Gainsborough	Bayardo
Dam Hanging Fall (GB) 1940	Solario (IRE); 1922	Gainsborough	Rosedrop
Dam Hanging Fall (GB) 1940	Solario (IRE); 1922	Sun Worship	Sundridge
Dam Hanging Fall (GB) 1940	Solario (IRE); 1922	Sun Worship	Doctrine
Dam Hanging Fall (GB) 1940	Meadow Rhu (GB); 1931	Phalaris	Polymelus
Dam Hanging Fall (GB) 1940	Meadow Rhu (GB); 1931	Phalaris	Bromus
Dam Hanging Fall (GB) 1940	Meadow Rhu (GB); 1931	Mellowness	Chaucer*
Dam Hanging Fall (GB) 1940	Meadow Rhu (GB); 1931	Mellowness	Dinner (Family: 11-a)

* Ridge Wood is inbred 5S x 4S x 5D to the stallion St Simon, meaning that he appears fifth generation (via Chaucer) and fourth generation on the sire side of his pedigree and fifth generation (via Chaucer) on the dam side of his pedigree.

* Ridge Wood is inbred 4S x 4D to the stallion Chaucer, meaning that he appears fourth generation on the sire side of his pedigree and fourth generation on the dam side of his pedigree.
