= Miho Shinzan =

Japanese Thoroughbred racehorse (1982–2014)

Miho Shinzan ミホシンザン
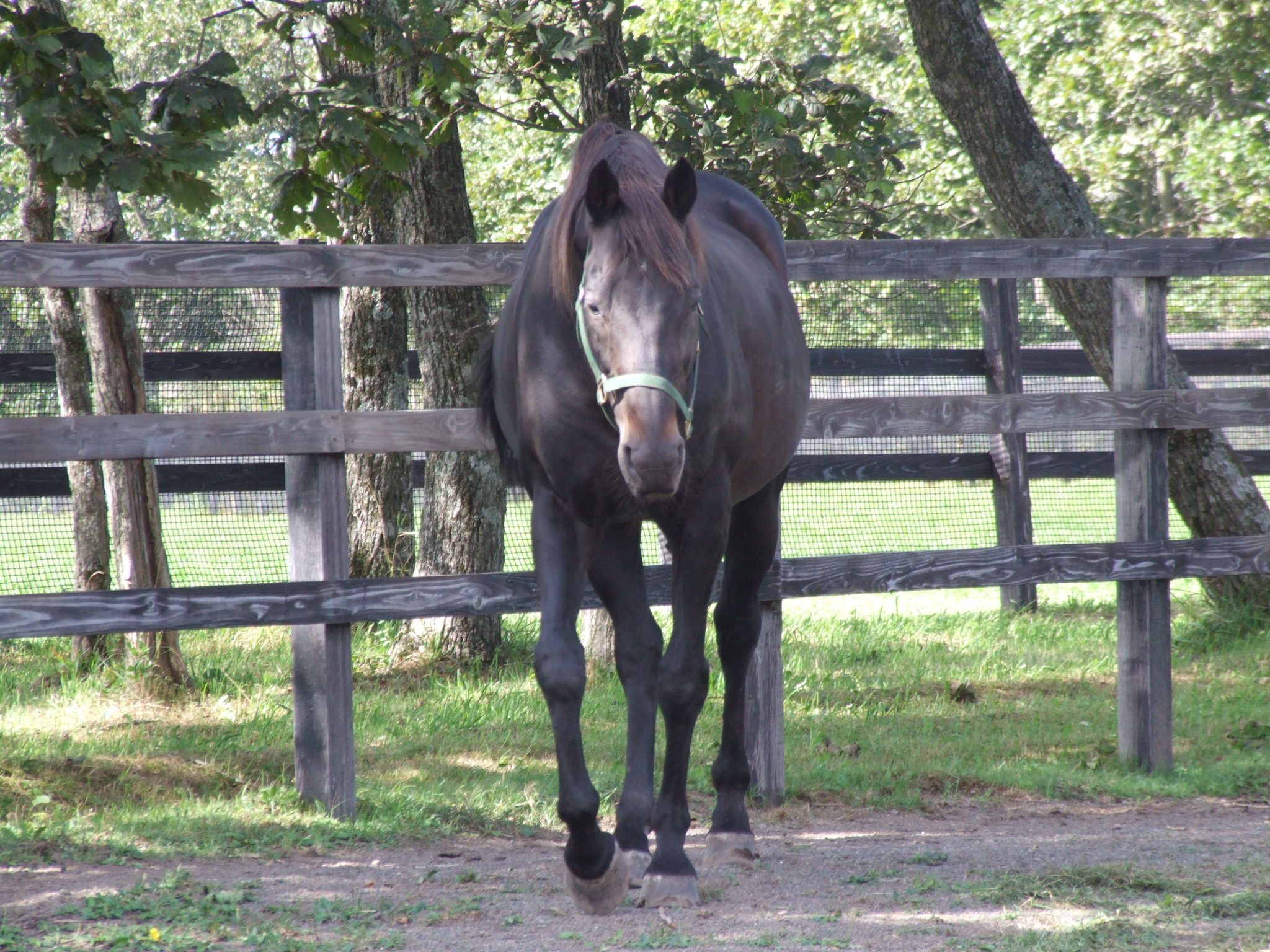
- Miho Shinzan in 2006
- Breed: Thoroughbred
- Sire: Shinzan
- Grandsire: Hindostan
- Dam: Napoli Jo O
- Damsire: Moutiers
- Sex: Stallion
- Foaled: 16 April 1982
- Died: 4 December 2014 (aged 32); Urakawa, Hokkaido, Japan
- Country: Japan
- Colour: Bay
- Breeder: Nisshin Bokujo
- Owner: Kanji Tsutsumi
- Racing colours
- Trainer: Tomojiro Tanaka
- Jockey: Masato Shibata
- Record: 16: 9-1-4
- Earnings: ¥484,679,200

Major wins
- Spring Stakes (1985); Kyoto Shimbun Hai (1985); American Jockey Club Cup (1987); Nikkei Shō (1987); Tennō Shō (Spring) (1987); Japanese Classic Race wins: Satsuki Shō (1985); Kikuka Shō (1985)

Awards
- Best 4-Year-Old Colt (1985); Best Japanese-Bred Horse (1985, 1986, 1987)

Miho Shinzan (Japanese: ミホシンザン, Hepburn: Miho Shinzan; 16 April 1982 – 4 December 2014) was a Japanese Thoroughbred racehorse and sire. He competed from 1985 to 1987, recording nine wins in sixteen starts, including the Satsuki Shō (GI) and Kikuka Shō (GI) in 1985, and the Tennō Shō (Spring, GI) in 1987. He won two legs of the Japanese Classic Triple Crown but missed the Tōkyō Yūshun (Japanese Derby) due to injury, earning him the nickname "the phantom triple crown horse." He was the most successful racehorse sired by Shinzan, the 1964 Japanese Triple Crown winner, and was described as "Shinzan's greatest masterpiece."

== Background ==
Miho Shinzan was a bay horse bred in Urakawa, Hokkaido, by Nisshin Bokujo. He was sired by Shinzan, the 1964 Japanese Triple Crown winner and a leading Japanese-bred stallion, and his dam was Napoli Jo O, a daughter of the French-bred stallion Moutiers. His racing name combines the "Miho" prefix used by owner Kanji Tsutsumi, whose company was based near the Miho Training Center, with the name of his sire Shinzan. He was owned by Kanji Tsutsumi and sent into training with Tomojiro Tanaka at the JRA's Miho Training Center. His regular jockey was Masato Shibata, who had first been inspired to become a jockey after watching Shinzan win the 1964 Tōkyō Yūshun.

== Racing career ==
=== 1985: three-year-old season (four-year-old by Japanese reckoning) ===
Miho Shinzan debuted on January 6, 1985, in a maiden race on the turf at Nakayama Racecourse, winning by nine lengths. He won the Suisen Sho (Allowance) at Nakayama in February and the Spring Stakes (GII) at Nakayama in March, defeating Scrum Dyna by 1.75 lengths.

On April 14, he won the Satsuki Shō (GI) at Nakayama by five lengths, becoming the twelfth horse to win the race undefeated. Three days later, he was diagnosed with a fracture of the left third carpal bone, forcing him to miss the Tōkyō Yūshun (Japanese Derby) and ending his bid for the Triple Crown.

He returned in September, finishing fifth in the St. Lite Kinen (GIII) at Nakayama. He won the Kyoto Shimbun Hai (GII) at Kyoto Racecourse in October and the Kikuka Shō (GI) at Kyoto in November, defeating Suda Hawk by 1.25 lengths to complete the Classic double. He finished second in the Arima Kinen (GI) at Nakayama in December, beaten four lengths by Symboli Rudolf.

=== 1986: four-year-old season ===
Miho Shinzan finished sixth in the Nikkei Shō (GII) at Nakayama in March, after which a recurrence of his previous fracture was discovered, forcing him to miss the spring season. He returned in October, finishing third in the Mainichi Ōkan (GII), Tennō Shō (Autumn, GI), Japan Cup (GI), and Arima Kinen (GI) in four consecutive starts.

=== 1987: five-year-old season and retirement ===
Miho Shinzan won the American Jockey Club Cup (GII) at Nakayama in January, his first victory in fourteen months. He won the Nikkei Shō (GII) at Nakayama in April by five lengths. On April 29, he won the Tennō Shō (Spring, GI) at Kyoto, defeating Nishino Raiden by a nose in a photo finish, recording his third Grade 1 victory.

He was retired from racing in October 1987 after developing tendonitis in his right foreleg during training.

== Statistics ==
The following table details all 16 starts of Miho Shinzan's racing career based on official netkeiba and JBIS records.

Date	Distance (Condition)	Race	Class	Course	Odds (Favourite)	Field	Finish	Time	Jockey	Winning (Losing) Margin	Winner (2nd Place)	Ref
1985 – three-year-old season
Jan 6	Turf 1600 m (Firm)	4-Y-O Newcomer	Maiden	Nakayama	2.9 (1st)	16	1st	1:36.1	Masato Shibata	–1.5	(Makino Hata)	
Feb 23	Turf 2000 m (Good)	Suisen Sho	Allowance	Nakayama	2.0 (1st)	11	1st	2:02.6	Masato Shibata	–0.4	(Monte Japan)	
Mar 24	Turf 1800 m (Good)	Spring Stakes	GII	Nakayama	2.1 (1st)	11	1st	1:49.5	Masato Shibata	–0.3	(Scrum Dyna)	
Apr 14	Turf 2000 m (Good)	Satsuki Shō	GI	Nakayama	3.9 (1st)	22	1st	2:02.1	Masato Shibata	–0.8	(Scrum Dyna)	
Sep 29	Turf 2200 m (Heavy)	St. Lite Kinen	GIII	Nakayama	1.8 (1st)	10	5th	2:21.0	Masato Shibata	1.5	Tiger Boy	
Oct 20	Turf 2200 m (Firm)	Kyoto Shimbun Hai	GII	Kyoto	1.9 (1st)	13	1st	2:14.5	Masato Shibata	–0.3	(Speed Hero)	
Nov 10	Turf 3000 m (Good)	Kikuka Shō	GI	Kyoto	2.3 (1st)	18	1st	3:08.1	Masato Shibata	–0.2	(Suda Hawk)	
Dec 22	Turf 2500 m (Firm)	Arima Kinen	GI	Nakayama	5.9 (2nd)	10	2nd	2:33.8	Masato Shibata	0.7	Symboli Rudolf	
1986 – four-year-old season
Mar 30	Turf 2500 m (Soft)	Nikkei Shō	GII	Nakayama	1.4 (1st)	12	6th	2:36.5	Masato Shibata	1.3	Chestnut Valley	
Oct 5	Turf 1800 m (Firm)	Mainichi Ōkan	GII	Tokyo	2.6 (1st)	8	3rd	1:46.6	Masato Shibata	0.6	Sakura Yutaka O	
Oct 26	Turf 2000 m (Firm)	Tennō Shō (Autumn)	GI	Tokyo	2.1 (1st)	16	3rd	1:59.0	Masato Shibata	0.7	Sakura Yutaka O	
Nov 23	Turf 2400 m (Firm)	Japan Cup	GI	Tokyo	7.5 (4th)	14	3rd	2:25.2	Masato Shibata	0.2	Jupiter Island	
Dec 21	Turf 2500 m (Good)	Arima Kinen	GI	Nakayama	2.3 (1st)	12	3rd	2:34.2	Masato Shibata	0.2	Dyna Gulliver	
1987 – five-year-old season
Jan 25	Turf 2200 m (Firm)	American Jockey Club Cup	GII	Nakayama	1.5 (1st)	6	1st	2:15.4	Masato Shibata	–0.2	(Suzu Parade)	
Apr 5	Turf 2500 m (Firm)	Nikkei Shō	GII	Nakayama	2.2 (1st)	7	1st	2:33.8	Masato Shibata	–0.8	(Jusaburo)	
Apr 29	Turf 3200 m (Firm)	Tennō Shō (Spring)	GI	Kyoto	1.3 (1st)	10	1st	3:20.4	Masato Shibata	–0.2	(Asahi Emperor)	

== Stud career ==
Following his retirement, Miho Shinzan entered stud at Tanigawa Bokujo in Urakawa, Hokkaido, in 1988. His most successful offspring was My Shinzan, winner of the 1993 NHK Hai (GII) and 1995 Asahi Challenge Cup (GIII). He also sired Grand Shinzan, winner of the 2001 Aichi Hai (GIII). He was retired from stud duty in 2002 and spent his remaining years as a pensioner at Tanigawa Bokujo. He died of heart failure on December 4, 2014, at the age of 32.

== Pedigree ==
Pedigree of Miho Shinzan (JPN)
Sire Shinzan (JPN) 1961	Hindostan (GB); 1946	Bois Roussel	Vatout
Sire Shinzan (JPN) 1961	Hindostan (GB); 1946	Bois Roussel	Plucky Liege
Sire Shinzan (JPN) 1961	Hindostan (GB); 1946	Sonibai	Solario
Sire Shinzan (JPN) 1961	Hindostan (GB); 1946	Sonibai	Udaipur
Sire Shinzan (JPN) 1961	Haya Nobori (JPN); 1949	Hayatake	Theft
Sire Shinzan (JPN) 1961	Haya Nobori (JPN); 1949	Hayatake	Hiryu
Sire Shinzan (JPN) 1961	Haya Nobori (JPN); 1949	Dai Go Bachanam Beauty	Tournesol
Sire Shinzan (JPN) 1961	Haya Nobori (JPN); 1949	Dai Go Bachanam Beauty	Bachanam Beauty
Dam Napoli Jo O (JPN) 1975	Moutiers (FR); 1958	Sicambre	Prince Bio
Dam Napoli Jo O (JPN) 1975	Moutiers (FR); 1958	Sicambre	Sif
Dam Napoli Jo O (JPN) 1975	Moutiers (FR); 1958	Ballynash	Nasrullah
Dam Napoli Jo O (JPN) 1975	Moutiers (FR); 1958	Ballynash	Ballywellbroke
Dam Napoli Jo O (JPN) 1975	Tai-Tai (GB); 1969	Will Somers	Tudor Minstrel
Dam Napoli Jo O (JPN) 1975	Tai-Tai (GB); 1969	Will Somers	Queen's Jest
Dam Napoli Jo O (JPN) 1975	Tai-Tai (GB); 1969	Anneiv	Vienna
Dam Napoli Jo O (JPN) 1975	Tai-Tai (GB); 1969	Anneiv	Singing Sister

- Miho Shinzan is inbred 5 × 5 to Gainsborough (sire side) and 5 × 5 to Nearco (dam side).
- His sire Shinzan won the 1964 Japanese Triple Crown and was a leading Japanese-bred stallion.

== See also ==
- Thoroughbred racing in Japan
- Shinzan
- Satsuki Shō
- Kikuka Shō
