= Taboun =

French-bred Thoroughbred racehorse

- Sire: Tabriz
- Grandsire: Tehran
- Dam: Queen of Basrah
- Damsire: Fair Trial
- Sex: Stallion
- Foaled: 22 February 1956
- Country: United States
- Colour: Bay
- Breeder: Aga Khan III and Aly Khan
- Owner: Aly Khan
- Trainer: Alec Head
- Record: 10:4-3-0

Major wins
- Prix Robert Papin (1958); Prix Djebel (1959); 2000 Guineas (1959)

Taboun (22 February 1956 – 1962) was a French Thoroughbred racehorse and sire, best known for winning the classic 2000 Guineas in 1959. As a two-year-old in 1958, Taboun won the Prix Robert Papin and finished second in the Coventry Stakes and the Prix Morny. In the following spring the colt won the Prix Djebel and the 2000 Guineas but failed to win again and finished unplaced in his last three races. He was retired to stud where he made little impact before dying at the age of six.

== Background ==
Taboun was a "big, powerful" bay horse bred in France by the father and son team of the Aga Khan and Prince Aly Khan. He raced in Aly Khan's colours and was trained at Chantilly by Alec Head. Taboun was sired by the Aga Khan's stallion Tabriz, whose career was ended by injury after winning the Royal Lodge Stakes as a two-year-old in 1949. Taboun's dam Queen of Basrah was a half-sister of Noor, an Irish-bred horse who was named American Champion Older Male Horse in 1950 and of the Cambridgeshire Handicap winner Nahar. The mare died shortly after Taboun's birth.

== Racing career ==
=== 1958:two-year-old season ===
On his racecourse debut in May 1958, Taboun won the Prix Maintenon at Maisons-Laffitte Racecourse. He was moved up in class when he was sent to England in June to contest the Coventry Stakes at Royal Ascot and finished second to the American-bred Hieroglyph. He returned to Maisons-Laffitte in August and recorded his first important win when he won the Prix Robert Papin over 1200 metres from Steamer and Thymus. Later that month he finished second to Oceanic when favourite for the Prix Morny at Deauville.

=== 1959:three-year-old season ===
Taboun began his three-year-old season with a third success as at Maisons-Laffitte when he recorded a very easy win in the 1400 metre Prix Djebel. The colt then raced Britain for a second time when he contested the 2000 Guineas over Newmarket's Rowley Mile course on 29 April. Ridden by the Australian jockey George Moore he started the 5/2 favourite in a field of thirteen runners. He won decisively by three lengths from the Middle Park Stakes winner Masham, with Carnoustie a neck further back in third place. Taboun ran next in the French equivalent of the 2000 Guineas, the Poule d'Essai des Poulains at Longchamp, in which he attempted to become the second horse, after Djebel in 1940 to win both races. He was made the odds-on favourite but finished second to the Charles Semblat-trained outsider Thymus, appearing to be a rather unlucky loser.

Taboun's subsequent form deteriorated. He finished unplaced in his remaining three races including the Prix Lupin at Longchamp and the St. James's Palace Stakes at Ascot. In the latter race he started the 7/4 favourite but finished last of the five runners.

The success of Taboun helped Aly Khan become British flat racing Champion Owner with record prize money of more than £100,000.

== Assessment ==
In their book A Century of Champions, based on a modified version of the Timeform system, John Randall and Tony Morris rated Taboun an "average" winner of the 2000 Guineas.

== Stud record ==
Taboun was retired from racing to become a breeding stallion in Ireland, but had little chance to make an impact. He sired a few minor winners before being fatally injured in an accident in 1962.

== Sire line tree ==
- Taboun
  - Jour Et Nuit
  - Go Tobann
    - Pele

== Pedigree ==
Pedigree of Taboun (FR), bay stallion, 1956
Sire Tabriz (IRE) 1954	Tehran (GB); 1940	Bois Roussel	Vatout
Sire Tabriz (IRE) 1954	Tehran (GB); 1940	Bois Roussel	Plucky Liege
Sire Tabriz (IRE) 1954	Tehran (GB); 1940	Stafaralla	Solario
Sire Tabriz (IRE) 1954	Tehran (GB); 1940	Stafaralla	Mirawala*
Sire Tabriz (IRE) 1954	La Li (FR); 1941	Blenheim	Blandford*
Sire Tabriz (IRE) 1954	La Li (FR); 1941	Blenheim	Malva
Sire Tabriz (IRE) 1954	La Li (FR); 1941	La Boni	Pharos*
Sire Tabriz (IRE) 1954	La Li (FR); 1941	La Boni	La Mauri
Dam Queen of Basrah (IRE) 1948	Fair Trial (GB); 1936	Fairway	Phalaris*
Dam Queen of Basrah (IRE) 1948	Fair Trial (GB); 1936	Fairway	Scapa Flow*
Dam Queen of Basrah (IRE) 1948	Fair Trial (GB); 1936	Lady Juror	Son-in-Law
Dam Queen of Basrah (IRE) 1948	Fair Trial (GB); 1936	Lady Juror	Lady Josephine
Dam Queen of Basrah (IRE) 1948	Queen of Baghdad (GB); 1941	Bahram	Blandford*
Dam Queen of Basrah (IRE) 1948	Queen of Baghdad (GB); 1941	Bahram	Friar's Daughter
Dam Queen of Basrah (IRE) 1948	Queen of Baghdad (GB); 1941	Queen of Scots	Dark Legend
Dam Queen of Basrah (IRE) 1948	Queen of Baghdad (GB); 1941	Queen of Scots	Grand Princess (Family 16-h)

* Taboun is inbred 4S x 4D to the stallion Blandford, meaning that he appears fourth generation on the sire side of his pedigree and fourth generation on the dam side of his pedigree.

* Taboun is inbred 5S x 5S x 4D to the stallion Phalaris, meaning that he appears fifth generation twice (via Mirawala and Pharos) on the sire side of his pedigree and fourth generation once on the dam side of his pedigree.

* Taboun is inbred 5S x 4D to the mare Scapa Flow, meaning that she appears fifth generation (via Pharos) on the sire side of his pedigree and fourth generation on the dam side of his pedigree.
