= Rag Trade =

Rag Trade may refer to:

- Clothing industry
- Textile industry
- Rag Trade (horse), a British-bred Thoroughbred racehorse
- The Rag Trade, a British television sitcom
- "The Rag Trade" (song), TV theme
