= Tulyar =

Irish-bred Thoroughbred racehorse

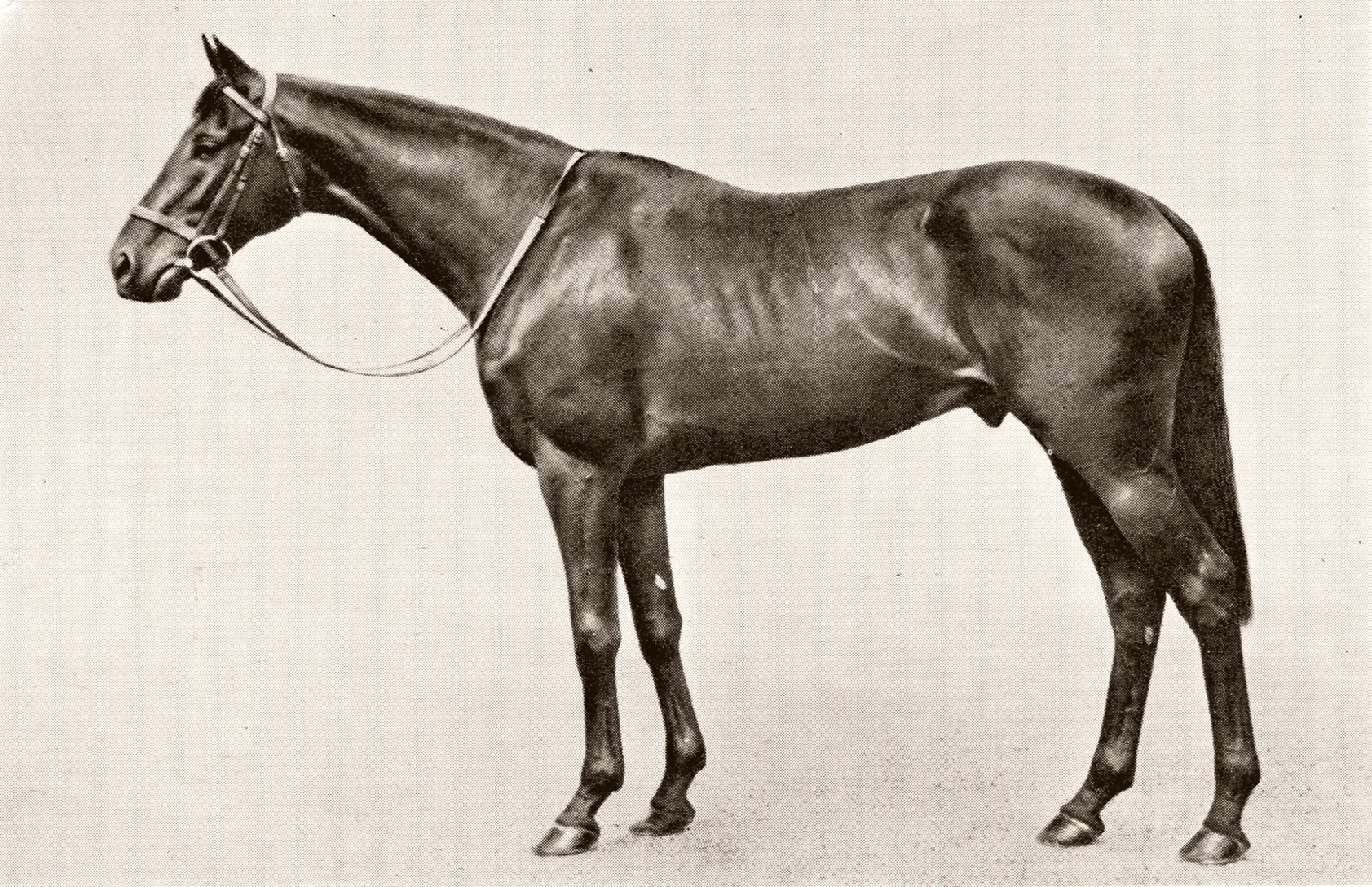
- Sire: Tehran (IRE)
- Grandsire: Bois Roussel
- Dam: Neocracy
- Damsire: Nearco
- Sex: Stallion
- Foaled: 14 May 1949
- Country: Ireland
- Colour: Bay or brown
- Breeder: Aga Khan III
- Owner: Aga Khan III
- Trainer: Marcus Marsh
- Record: 13: 9-1-1
- Earnings: £76,413

Major wins
- Lingfield Derby Trial (1952); Epsom Derby (1952); King George VI & Queen Elizabeth Stakes (1952); Eclipse Stakes (1952); Ormonde Stakes (1952); St Leger Stakes (1952)

Honours
- Timeform Top-rated horse (1952)
- Last updated on 25 May 2011

Tulyar (1949–1972) was an Irish bred, British-trained Thoroughbred racehorse and sire. He won The Derby, the St Leger Stakes, the King George VI & Queen Elizabeth Stakes, the Ormonde Stakes and the Eclipse Stakes setting a record for a single season's earnings in England. He stood at stud in Ireland and America, but failed to live up to expectations as a sire.

== Background ==
Tulyar was a brown horse bred by his owner HH Aga Khan III. He was sired by Tehran and was the first foal of the mare Neocracy by the undefeated racehorse and outstanding sire, Nearco. Tehran, won six races including the St Leger Stakes for earnings of £7,258 and he was a Champion Sire. Tulyar's dam, Neocracy won two races worth £2,562 as a two-year-old. She also produced several other winners including the 1959 Eclipse Stakes winner Saint Crespin III. Neocracy's dam, Harina, won the Imperial Produce Stakes of £4,128. Harina was a full sister to the Derby and St Leger winner, Trigo. Tulyar is inbred to Phalaris in the fourth remove of his pedigree.

== Racing career ==
=== 1951: two-year-old season ===
Tulyar began his racing career by finishing unplaced in a race at Newmarket in Spring and then ran third in a race at Ascot in July. In August he was sent to York where he finished unplaced in the Acomb Stakes. In autumn, Tulyar was moved up in distance and won two races over one mile, taking Nursery Handicaps at Haydock and Birmingham. On his final appearance of the season, he finished second in the Horris Hill Stakes at Newbury.

In the Free Handicap, a rating of the best British two-year-olds, Tulyar was given a rating of 114 pounds, nineteen pounds below the top-rated Windy City.

=== 1952: three-year-old season ===
On his three-year-old debut, Tulyar showed form well in advance of anything he had displayed in 1951 when he easily defeated the Middle Park Stakes winner King's Bench in the Henry VIII Stakes at Hurst Park. Tulyar did not run in the 2000 Guineas at Newmarket, in which King's Bench finished second to the French colt Thunderhead. Tulyar made his next appearance at Chester where he won the Ormonde Stakes by half a length from Nikiforos. Later in May he won the Lingfield Derby Trial by two lengths to establish himself as a contender for The Derby.

At Epsom, Tulyar started at odds of 11/2 for the Derby after a "last-minute plunge" made him favourite. Ridden by Charlie Smirke, he took the lead two furlongs from the finish and held off the late challenge of Gay Time to win by half a length in a time of 2 minutes 36.4 seconds. Shortly before the race, Smirke had sent a telegram to the Press Club which read "On Wednesday I will be saying to you What did I Tulyar". Tulyar was led into the winner's enclosure by his owner's son Prince Aly Khan. In July, Tulyar moved down in distance for the Eclipse Stakes over ten furlongs at Sandown and won "easily" from his stable companion Mehmandar. Later in the same month he contested the second running of the King George VI & Queen Elizabeth Stakes at Ascot. He won a "thrilling race" by a neck from Gay Time with the future Washington, D.C. International winner Worden in third.

In September, Tulyar started 10/11 favourite for the St Leger at Doncaster. He won by three lengths from Kingsford and eleven others.

At the end of the 1952 season, the Aga Khan sold Tulyar to the Irish National Stud for £250,000 which was a world record price up to that time for a Thoroughbred horse. It was originally planned that Tulyar would race in 1953, but the Irish government decided not to risk their investment and the horse was retired to stud.

== Assessment and honours ==
At the time of his retirement from racing, Tulyar had earned £76,577, breaking the record for prize money won by a British horse which had been set fifty-seven years earlier by Isinglass. Tulyar's record stood for six years until it was beaten by Ballymoss.

Timeform awarded Tulyar a rating of 134 in 1952. He was the highest-rated European horse of the year.

Following the London & North Eastern Railway tradition of naming locomotives after winning racehorses, the English Electric 'Deltic' diesel locomotive, no. D9015 (later 55015) was named after Tulyar on 13 October 1961 and remained in service until 2 January 1982, and has been preserved.

== Stud record ==
Tulyar commenced stud duties as a five-year-old in Ireland at a fee of 600 guineas a mare. Nominations approaching 100 every season came in from Ireland, England, France, America, Germany and Italy. These numbers were then reduced by the Directors of the Stud.

In 1955 Tulyar was sold to an American syndicate led by Arthur B. Hancock for £240,000 and his delivery was made after the 1956 stud season. His fee in America was set at $10,000 a mare. After arrival in the States he contracted a serious illness and he could not be used in 1957.

Tulyar sired the winners of 66 races worth £33,022. He was the damsire of the winners of 51 races worth £40,788. His stakes winning progeny included:

- Fiorentina (IRE), won 1959 Irish 1,000 Guineas
- Ginetta (IRE), won 1959 Poule d'Essai des Pouliches
- Mako (USA), won the American Grand National race

In America Tulyar and his sons, did have an influence on jumpers and some Warmblood horses.

== Sire line tree ==
- Tulyar
  - Menelek
    - April Seventh
    - Rag Trade
    - Hallo Dandy
    - Bit of a Skite
  - Bahrain
    - Warren Point
    - Airborne
    - The Swan
  - Mako

== Pedigree ==
Pedigree of Tulyar (IRE), bay or brown stallion 1949
Sire Tehran (IRE) B. 1941	Bois Roussel (FR); 1935	Vatout	Prince Chimay
Sire Tehran (IRE) B. 1941	Bois Roussel (FR); 1935	Vatout	Vasthi
Sire Tehran (IRE) B. 1941	Bois Roussel (FR); 1935	Plucky Liege	Spearmint*
Sire Tehran (IRE) B. 1941	Bois Roussel (FR); 1935	Plucky Liege	Concertina
Sire Tehran (IRE) B. 1941	Stafaralla (FR); 1935	Solario (GB)	Gainsborough
Sire Tehran (IRE) B. 1941	Stafaralla (FR); 1935	Solario (GB)	Sun Worship
Sire Tehran (IRE) B. 1941	Stafaralla (FR); 1935	Mirawala	Phalaris*
Sire Tehran (IRE) B. 1941	Stafaralla (FR); 1935	Mirawala	Miranda
Dam Neocracy (GB) 1944	Nearco (ITY); 1935	Pharos	Phalaris*
Dam Neocracy (GB) 1944	Nearco (ITY); 1935	Pharos	Scapa Flow
Dam Neocracy (GB) 1944	Nearco (ITY); 1935	Nogara	Havresac
Dam Neocracy (GB) 1944	Nearco (ITY); 1935	Nogara	Catnip*
Dam Neocracy (GB) 1944	Harina (IRE); 1933	Blandford	Swynford
Dam Neocracy (GB) 1944	Harina (IRE); 1933	Blandford	Blanche
Dam Neocracy (GB) 1944	Harina (IRE); 1933	Athasi	Farasi
Dam Neocracy (GB) 1944	Harina (IRE); 1933	Athasi	Athgreany (Family: 22-a)

* Tulyar is inbred 4S x 4D to the stallion Phalaris, meaning that he appears fourth generation on the sire side of his pedigree and fourth generation on the dam side of his pedigree.

* Tulyar is inbred 4S x 5D to the stallion Spearmint, meaning that he appears fourth generation on the sire side of his pedigree and fifth generation (via Catnip) on the dam side of his pedigree.
