= Noel Murless =

English Thoroughbred trainer (1910–1987)

Personal information
- Born: 24 March 1910 Malpas, Cheshire, United Kingdom
- Died: 9 May 1987 (aged 77)
- Occupation: Trainer

Horse racing career
- Sport: Horse racing

Major racing wins
- British Classic Race wins as trainer: 2000 Guineas (2); 1000 Guineas (6); Epsom Derby (3); Epsom Oaks (5); St Leger (3)

Racing awards
- British flat racing Champion Trainer (1948, 1957, 1959, 1960, 1961, 1967, 1968, 1970, 1973)

Honours
- Noel Murless Stakes at Ascot Racecourse

Significant horses
- Ridge Wood, Princely Gift, Crepello, Carrozza, Petite Etoile, St. Paddy, Twilight Alley, Aunt Edith, Fleet, Royal Palace, Busted, Caergwrle, Lupe, Altesse Royale, Mysterious, J. O. Tobin, Jumping Hill

Sir Charles Francis Noel Murless (24 March 1910 – 9 May 1987) was an English racehorse trainer who one of the most successful of the twentieth century. Murless began his career as a trainer in 1935 at Hambleton Lodge in Yorkshire before moving to Hambleton House after the war, at one time sharing premises with Ryan Price. In 1947, he moved south, first to Beckhampton, Wiltshire (where he was champion trainer in his first season) and then to Warren Place, Newmarket.

Murless had nineteen classic wins in England and two in Ireland. Of these, there were three Epsom Derby wins, with Crepello (1957), St. Paddy (1960) and Royal Palace (1967). He also had an outstanding record in The Oaks, saddling no less than five winners: Carrozza (1957), Petite Etoile (1959), Lupe (1970), Altesse Royale (1971) and Mysterious (1973). His greatest horse was arguably Royal Palace, who preceded his Derby success by winning the 2,000 Guineas, to which he added the Eclipse and the King George VI and Queen Elizabeth Stakes the following year.

In 1952 he became manager of Eve Stud.

== Training career – Hambleton ==
Noel Murless commenced training in 1935, when his first winner was Rubin Wood in the Lee Plate at Lanark Racecourse. He first made his mark as a trainer after the Second World War in 1947 by winning two famous handicaps, the Britannia Stakes at Royal Ascot with Oros and the Steward's Cup at Glorious Goodwood with Closeburn. Oros was a "top class mile handicapper".

Closeburn was just below the very best sprinters of 1947 and was placed in the Cork and Orrery and July Cup before winning the Stewards Cup under a record weight at the time for a 3-year-old of 8–10. He went on to win the Challenge Stakes in October, then run over 6 furlongs. The Bloodstock Breeders Review of 1947 said of Closeburn "The credit of breeding the winner goes to his young trainer who, at the end of the season, followed Fred Darling as the "Master" of the famous Beckhampton stable".

== Training career – Beckhampton ==
1948 was Murless' first season at Beckhampton in Wiltshire after taking over from Fred Darling. There was immediate success with Queenpot winning the 1,000 Guineas and The Cobbler taking second place in the 2,000 Guineas. Three winners at Royal Ascot included a two-year-old Abernant, who was to become one of the finest sprinters of the second half of the century. Other significant winners of the year included Goblet in the Falmouth Stakes at Newmarket and the Nassau Stakes at Goodwood, Gold Mist in Doncaster's Portland Handicap and Royal Forest in the Dewhurst Stakes. The move to Beckhampton also led to King George VI becoming one of Noel Murless's owners, for whom he trained three winners in 1948. Noel was Champion Trainer for the first time in 1948 and also had three (Abernant, Royal Forest and Faux Tirage) out of the first four in the Two Year Old Free Handicap for the year.

Noel Murless trained another three years at Beckhampton but was not entirely happy, according to his biographer Tim Fitzgeorge-Parker. Those three years did lead to a second classic winner with Ridge Wood in the 1949 St Leger and the dominance of the sprinting ranks by Abernant, who won the King Stand at Royal Ascot in 1949; July Cup at Newmarket, King George Stakes at Goodwood and Nunthorpe Stakes at York in both 1949 and 1950.

== Training career – Warren Place ==
Murless moved to Warren Place in Newmarket towards the end of the 1952 Flat season. Although there were no immediate classic winners, the quality of horses was expected to improve as new high-spending owners became patrons of the yard. These owners included the Aga Khan, and his son Aly Khan who had offered support prior to the move. Murless said of Prince Aly Khan in his biography that he was "highly intelligent, a first class judge of a horse and of form and breeding". Winners in 1953 included the Cork and Orrery with Blood Test at Royal Ascot, and Buckhound in the Jockey Club Stakes at Newmarket. The Queen's Landau won the Rous Memorial Stakes at Royal Ascot and the Sussex Stakes at the Glorious Goodwood festival in 1954. In the same year, at Royal Ascot Gordon Richards won the King Edward VII Stakes on Rashleigh, trained by Noel. This race lead ultimately to the up-and-coming young new jockey of the time having his licence removed for six months: that jockey was Lester Piggott who in 1955 would take over as stable jockey for Murless, following Sir Gordon Richards' retirement. Piggott and Murless together would be a dynamic combination in British Flat Racing for the next decade.

A major owner of horses at Warren Place was Sir Victor Sassoon, whose Eve Stud Noel managed. In 1955 Sassoon sent the yearling Crepello to Warren Place. Crepello was to win the Dewhurst Stakes in 1956 and the Two Thousand Guineas plus the Derby in 1957.

1967 was probably Murless' most successful year as a trainer. Victories included three of the home classics, Eclipse and King George. He was Champion Trainer. A win for the Queen's Hopeful Venture in the Wood Ditton at the Craven meeting was followed by victories in the two traditional 1,000 Guineas trials for Cranberry Sauce in the Nell Gwynn, and Royal Saint in the Fred Darling. Busted, who had been drafted into the stable to lead the classic colts, won the Coronation Stakes over 10f at Sandown in April and was deemed too good to continue as a lead horse. The Two Thousand Guineas was won by Royal Palace, and the following day Fleet was victorious in the One Thousand Guineas. Royal Palace went on to win the Derby whilst Busted won the Eclipse, King George VI Diamond Stakes and Prix Foy before tendon injury prevented an attempt at the Arc. 63 races were won with winning stakes of £279,775.

Murless retired in 1976 as trainer of horses and was knighted the following year. His son-in-law, Henry Cecil, took over Warren Place.
