= Lupe (horse) =

British Thoroughbred racehorse

- Racing silks of Gladys Joel
- Sire: Primera
- Grandsire: My Babu
- Dam: Alcoa
- Damsire: Alycidon
- Sex: Mare
- Foaled: 1967
- Country: United Kingdom
- Colour: Bay
- Breeder: Snailwell Stud
- Owner: Gladys Joel
- Trainer: Noel Murless
- Record: 7: 6-0-0
- Earnings: £52,764

Major wins
- Cheshire Oaks (1970); Epsom Oaks (1970); Yorkshire Oaks (1970); Coronation Cup (1971); Princess of Wales's Stakes (1971)

Honours
- Lupe Stakes at Goodwood Racecourse; Timeform rating: 123

Lupe (1967–1989) was a British Thoroughbred racehorse. In a racing career lasting from September 1969 until July 1971, the filly ran seven times and won six races. As a three-year-old she won the Oaks at Epsom and the Yorkshire Oaks at York before sustaining her only defeat in the Prix Vermeille. Lupe returned as a four-year-old and defeated colts to win the Coronation Cup and the Princess of Wales's Stakes. She was then retired from racing and became a successful broodmare.

== Background ==
Lupe was a bay filly bred at the Snailwell Stud in Newmarket. The stud was owned by Stanhope Joel, and Lupe raced in the colours of Joel's wife, Gladys. The filly was bred for stamina: her sire Primera won the fourteen-furlong Ebor Handicap while her dam Alcoa, was an out-and-out stayer who won over two and a quarter miles and finished second in the Cesarewitch. As a descendant of the broodmare Tillywhim, Alcoa was a member of the same branch of Thoroughbred family 1-k which produced the Prix de l'Arc de Triomphe winners Levmoss and Three Troikas. Lupe was trained by Noel Murless at his Warren Place stables at Newmarket.

== Racing career ==
Lupe did not appear on the racecourse until the autumn of 1969 and ran only once as a two-year-old. At Doncaster in September, she won a maiden race over six furlongs.

On her three-year-old debut in May 1970, Lupe was moved up in class to contest the Cheshire Oaks, a race that served as a trial for the Epsom Oaks in June. She won the race impressively to establish herself as a leading Classic contender. At Epsom Downs Racecourse on 6 June, she was made favourite for the Oaks at odds of 100/30 after being the subject of heavy betting on the day of the race. The field of sixteen runners included challengers form Ireland and France. Ridden by the twenty-two-year-old Sandy Barclay, Lupe took the lead two furlongs from the finish and drew away from her opponents to win easily by four lengths from State Pension and Arctic Wave. The filly was rested before returning in the Yorkshire Oaks at York in August. She won comfortably from Highest Hopes, who had previously finished second in the Prix de Diane. In September, Lupe was sent to France for the Prix Vermeille. She sustained the first and only defeat of her career as she finished sixth behind Highest Hopes and Miss Dan.

Unusually for a Classic winning filly at that time, Lupe remained in training as a four-year-old. She made her first appearance for nine months when she ran in the Coronation Cup at Epsom in June 1971. Ridden by Geoff Lewis, she won "readily" by a neck from the French-trained colt Stintino. A month later at Newmarket, Lupe won the Princess of Wales's Stakes at Newmarket, comfortably beating Sacramento Song.

== Retirement ==
Lupe spent most of her breeding career in the United States, where she proved to be a highly successful broodmare. Her sons included Lascaux (Prix Jean de Chaudenay), Leonardo da Vinci (White Rose Stakes) and Legend of France (Earl of Sefton Stakes). Her daughter Louveterie won the Prix Vanteaux and was the dam of the Group One winners Loup Sauvage (Prix d'Ispahan) and Loup Solitaire (Grand Critérium). She produced seven black-type winners in her career and had her last foal in 1988. Lupe died in 1989.

== Assessment and honours ==
In their book, A Century of Champions, based on the Timeform rating system, John Randall and Tony Morris rated Lupe an "average" winner of the Oaks.

Lupe was given a rating of 121 by Timeform in 1970, eight pounds below the leading three-year-old filly Highest Hopes and seventeen pounds below the top-rated horse of the year, Nijinsky.

The Lupe Stakes, a trial for the Epsom Oaks, was run at Goodwood Racecourse between 1972 and 2007.

== Pedigree ==
Pedigree of Lupe (GB), bay mare, 1967
Sire Primera (GB)	My Babu	Djebel	Tourbillon
Sire Primera (GB)	My Babu	Djebel	Loika
Sire Primera (GB)	My Babu	Perfume	Badruddin
Sire Primera (GB)	My Babu	Perfume	Lavendula
Sire Primera (GB)	Pirette	Deiri	Aethelstan
Sire Primera (GB)	Pirette	Deiri	Desra
Sire Primera (GB)	Pirette	Pimpette	Town Guard
Sire Primera (GB)	Pirette	Pimpette	Arpette
Dam Alcoa (GB)	Alycidon	Donatello	Blenheim
Dam Alcoa (GB)	Alycidon	Donatello	Delleana
Dam Alcoa (GB)	Alycidon	Aurora	Hyperion
Dam Alcoa (GB)	Alycidon	Aurora	Rose Red
Dam Alcoa (GB)	Phyllis Court	Court Martial	Fair Trial
Dam Alcoa (GB)	Phyllis Court	Court Martial	Instantaneous
Dam Alcoa (GB)	Phyllis Court	Lady Grand	Solario
Dam Alcoa (GB)	Phyllis Court	Lady Grand	Begum (Family 1-k)
