= J. O. Tobin =

American thoroughbred racehorse (1974–1994)

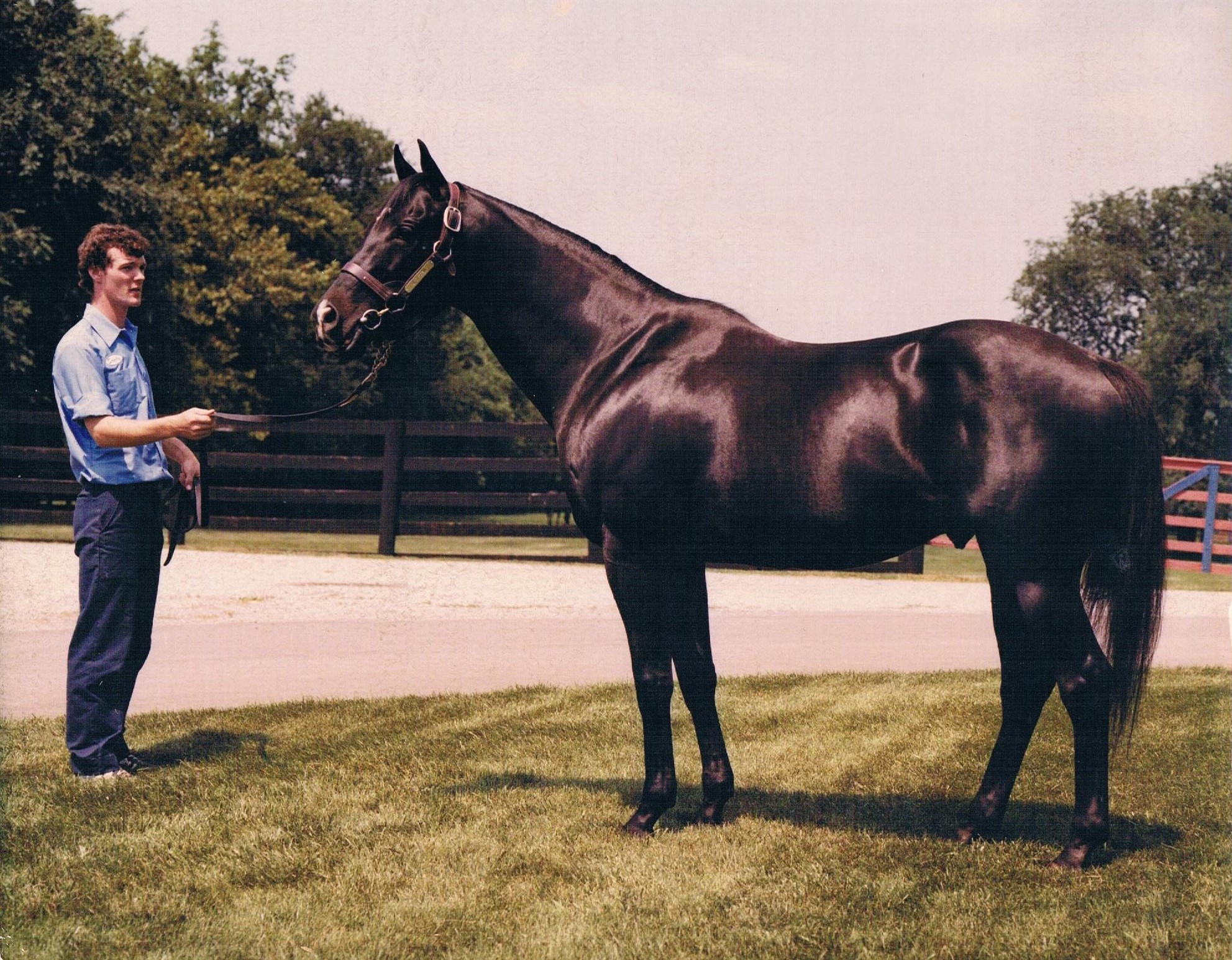
- J O Tobin at Spendthrift Farm in 1981
- Sire: Never Bend
- Grandsire: Nasrullah
- Dam: Hill Shade
- Damsire: Hillary
- Sex: Stallion
- Foaled: March 28, 1974
- Country: United States
- Colour: Dark bay or brown
- Breeder: George A. Pope Jr.
- Owner: George A. Pope Jr.
- Trainer: Noel Murless; John H. Adams; Laz Barrera
- Record: 21:12-2-2
- Earnings: $659,416

Major wins
- Richmond Stakes (1976); Champagne Stakes (1976); Coronado Handicap (1977); Swaps Stakes (1977); Malibu Stakes (1978); Californian Stakes (1978); Tom Fool Handicap (1978); Los Angeles Handicap (1978); San Bernardino Handicap (1978); Premiere Handicap (1978)

Awards
- Top-rated British two-year-old (1976); American Champion Sprint Horse (1978)

J. O. Tobin (March 28, 1974 – May 22, 1994) was an American-bred thoroughbred racehorse. As a two-year-old, he was sent to Europe, where he won his first three races, including the Richmond Stakes and Champagne Stakes, and was the highest-rated juvenile of the season in Britain. In the following year, he was transferred to the United States, where he recorded his most famous victory as he ended the undefeated streak of the Triple Crown winner Seattle Slew with a win in the Swaps Stakes. In the following year, he won a succession of major stakes races and was named American Champion Sprint Horse.

== Background ==
J. O. Tobin was an "impressive-looking" brown colt, with a small white star bred in Maryland by his owner, George A. Pope Jr. He was sired by Never Bend, the American Champion Two-Year-Old Colt of 1962 who went on to become a very successful breeding stallion whose other progeny included Mill Reef, Riverman, and Triple Bend. J. O. Tobin's dam, Hill Shade, was an American-bred mare who raced in Europe, winning the Nassau Stakes and Sun Chariot Stakes in 1968 and being awarded a rating of 116 by Timeform. Before foaling J.O. Tobin, she had produced an outstanding performer in Mysterious, winner of the 1000 Guineas and Oaks Stakes in 1973.

Pope initially sent his colt to race in England, where he was trained by Noel Murless in Newmarket, Suffolk.

== Racing career ==
=== 1976: two-year-old season ===
J.O. Tobin began his racing career with a win over Chain of Reasoning in the Fulbourn Maiden Stakes over six furlongs at Newmarket Racecourse on 8 July. Three weeks later, the colt was moved up in class for the Group Two Richmond Stakes at Goodwood Racecourse. Ridden by Lester Piggott, he started the 8/11 favourite and won from Priors Walk and Tachypous, a colt who later won the Middle Park Stakes.

J.O. Tobin's next race was the Champagne Stakes at Doncaster Racecourse in September, for which he was made the 4/9 favourite. In what was described by Timeform as a "breathtaking" performance, Piggott sat motionless on the colt until the final furlong, at which point J.O. Tobin accelerated clear of his rivals to win by four lengths from the filly Durtal. The form of the race was subsequently boosted when Durtal won the Cheveley Park Stakes and was rated the best two-year-old filly of the year in Britain. On his final appearance of the season, J.O. Tobin was matched against the outstanding French two-year-old Blushing Groom in a highly anticipated race for the Grand Critérium over 1600 metres at Longchamp Racecourse on 10 October. Blushing Groom, ridden by Henri Samani, started 4/5 favourite after wins in the Prix Robert Papin, Prix Morny and Prix de la Salamandre whilst J.O. Tobin, ridden as usual by Piggott, started at odds of 5/4. Piggott tracked Samani, but when Blushing Groom took the lead in the straight, J.O. Tobin was unable to maintain his challenge and finished third, beaten four lengths and a head by Blushing Groom and Amyntor.

=== 1977: three-year-old season ===
When Murless retired at the end of the 1976 season, Pope brought the horse back to the United States, where he was trained by former jockey and U.S. Racing Hall of Fame inductee John H. Adams. For his new trainer, the colt won the Coronado Handicap at Hollywood Park Racetrack in April and then finished fifth behind Seattle Slew in the Preakness Stakes. By the time J.O. Tobin met Seattle Slew in the Swaps Stakes, the latter had completed the Triple Crown in the Belmont Stakes to take his winning sequence to nine. J.O. Tobin led from the start and quickly went clear of Seattle Slew and Text. On the final turn, Seattle Slew began to weaken, and J.O. Tobin steadily increased his advantage in the straight. He beat Affiliate by 8 3/4-lengths in a time of 1:58 3/5 missing the track and world record for 1 1/4 miles by two-fifths of a second. Seattle Slew finished 4th, 16 lengths behind. Ridden by Bill Shoemaker, J.O. Tobin led from start to finish, running very fast fractions of 22 2/5 to the 1/4 mile, 45 2/5 to the 1/2 mile, 1:09 1/5 to the 3/4 mile & 1:33 3/5 to the mile.

=== 1978: four-year-old season ===
In 1978, J. O. Tobin's race conditioning was taken over by future Hall of Fame trainer Laz Barrera, who guided him to wins in six Graded stakes races and American Champion Sprint Horse honors. On his first appearance of the season, he won the Malibu Stakes by five and a half lengths at Santa Anita Park in January. He went on to win the Californian Stakes, Tom Fool Handicap, Los Angeles Handicap, San Bernardino Handicap, and Premiere Handicap. He was voted American Champion Sprint Horse at the Eclipse Awards for 1978.

== Assessment ==
There was no International Classification of European two-year-olds in 1976: the official handicappers of Britain, Ireland, and France compiled separate rankings for horses which competed in those countries. In the British Free Handicap, J.O. Tobin was given top-weight of 133 pounds, five pounds ahead of Godswalk, eight ahead of The Minstrel, and eleven ahead of Nebbiolo. The independent Timeform organisation gave him a rating of 130, making him their second best two-year-old of the year, a pound behind Blushing Groom.

== Retirement ==
J. O. Tobin was retired to stud in 1979 and his first crop of foals proved to be hugely popular in the sales ring. He was the leading freshman sire at the Keeneland yearling sales in 1981 ahead of his old adversary, Seattle Slew but overall he was not a success as a breeding stallion. He died in 1994 in Corrales, New Mexico.

== Pedigree ==
Pedigree of J O Tobin (USA), brown stallion, 1974
Sire Never Bend (USA) 1960	Nasrullah (IRE); 1940	Nearco	Pharos
Sire Never Bend (USA) 1960	Nasrullah (IRE); 1940	Nearco	Nogara
Sire Never Bend (USA) 1960	Nasrullah (IRE); 1940	Mumtaz Begum	Blenheim
Sire Never Bend (USA) 1960	Nasrullah (IRE); 1940	Mumtaz Begum	Mumtaz Mahal
Sire Never Bend (USA) 1960	Lalun (USA); 1952	Djeddah	Djebel
Sire Never Bend (USA) 1960	Lalun (USA); 1952	Djeddah	Djezima
Sire Never Bend (USA) 1960	Lalun (USA); 1952	Be Faithful	Bimelech
Sire Never Bend (USA) 1960	Lalun (USA); 1952	Be Faithful	Bloodroot
Dam Hill Shade (USA) 1965	Hillary (USA); 1952	Khaled	Hyperion
Dam Hill Shade (USA) 1965	Hillary (USA); 1952	Khaled	Eclair
Dam Hill Shade (USA) 1965	Hillary (USA); 1952	Snow Bunny	Boswell
Dam Hill Shade (USA) 1965	Hillary (USA); 1952	Snow Bunny	The Rose
Dam Hill Shade (USA) 1965	Penumbra (USA); 1955	Imperium	Piping Rock
Dam Hill Shade (USA) 1965	Penumbra (USA); 1955	Imperium	Imperatrice
Dam Hill Shade (USA) 1965	Penumbra (USA); 1955	Moonrise	Moonlight Run
Dam Hill Shade (USA) 1965	Penumbra (USA); 1955	Moonrise	Seventh Heaven (Family:3-m)
