= Geoff Lewis =

British jockey (1935–2025)

Personal information
- Born: 21 December 1935 Talgarth, Wales
- Died: 26 August 2025 (aged 89) Surrey, England
- Occupation: Jockey

Horse racing career
- Sport: Horse racing

Major racing wins
- British Classic Races; 1,000 Guineas Stakes (1973); 2,000 Guineas Stakes (1969); Epsom Derby (1971); Epsom Oaks (1971, 1973); Other major races Ascot Gold Cup (1971); Champion Stakes (1965, 1970); Coronation Cup (1971, 1972); Coronation Stakes (1958, 1971); Dewhurst Stakes (1970); Eclipse Stakes (1971); Haydock Sprint Cup (1979); International Stakes (1973); July Cup (1963); King George VI and Queen Elizabeth Stakes (1971); Lockinge Stakes (1966, 1971); Sun Chariot Stakes (1971); Sussex Stakes (1969); Yorkshire Oaks (1973)

Significant horses
- Altesse Royale, Lorenzaccio, Lupe, Mill Reef, Mysterious, Right Tack, Silly Season, Lake Coniston

1000 Guineas (1)
1973
Mysterious	Jacinth	Shellshock

2000 Guineas (1)
1969
Right Tack	Tower Walk	Welsh Pageant

Derby (1)
1971
Mill Reef	Linden Tree	Irish Ball

Oaks (2)
1971
Altesse Royale	Maina	La Manille
1973
Mysterious	Where You Lead	Aureoletta

Geoff Lewis (21 December 1935 – 26 August 2025) was a Welsh jockey.

== Biography ==
Lewis moved to London with his family (he was one of thirteen children) in 1946. After initially working as a hotel page boy, he started his racing career as an apprentice with Ron Smyth, who was a trainer in Epsom. Between 1953 and 1979, he rode 1,880 winners in Britain. Amongst his major wins were the 1,000 Guineas, 2,000 Guineas, Epsom Oaks (twice), Coronation Cup, and Prix de l'Arc de Triomphe. In 1971, he became the first Welsh jockey to win The Derby, when he partnered Mill Reef to victory.

Lewis retired as a jockey in 1979, after which he applied for a trainer's licence and began to train at Thirty Acre Barn, near Epsom racecourse. He trained almost 500 winners, including the outstanding sprinter Lake Coniston, before his retirement to Spain in 1999. In 2014, he moved back to Cranleigh, to be near his daughter in Ewhurst.

Lewis died in Surrey on 26 August 2025, at the age of 89.

== Major wins ==
(United Kingdom) Great Britain

- 1,000 Guineas Stakes – Mysterious (1973)
- 2,000 Guineas Stakes – Right Tack (1969)
- Ascot Gold Cup – Random Shot (1971)
- Champion Stakes – (2) – Silly Season (1965), Lorenzaccio (1970)
- Coronation Cup – (2) – Lupe (1971), Mill Reef (1972)
- Coronation Stakes – (2) – St Lucia (1958), Magic Flute (1971)
- Epsom Derby – Mill Reef (1971)
- Epsom Oaks – (2) – Altesse Royale (1971), Mysterious (1973)
- Dewhurst Stakes – (2) – Silly Season (1964), Mill Reef (1970)
- Eclipse Stakes – Mill Reef (1971)
- Haydock Sprint Cup – Double Form (1979)
- International Stakes – Moulton (1973)
- July Cup – Secret Step (1963)
- King George VI and Queen Elizabeth Stakes – Mill Reef (1971)
- Lockinge Stakes – (2) – Silly Season (1966), Welsh Pageant (1971)
- Sun Chariot Stakes – Hill Circus (1971)
- Sussex Stakes – Jimmy Reppin (1969)
- Yorkshire Oaks – Mysterious (1973)

France

- Prix de l'Arc de Triomphe – Mill Reef (1971)
- Prix Ganay – Mill Reef (1972)

== Bibliography ==
- Mortimer, Roger; Onslow, Richard; Willett, Peter (1978). Biographical Encyclopaedia of British Racing. London: Macdonald and Jane's. ISBN 0-354-08536-0.
- Wright, Howard (1986). The Encyclopaedia of Flat Racing. London: Robert Hale. ISBN 0-7090-2639-0.
- Tanner, Michael; Cranham, Gerry (1992). Great Jockeys of the Flat. Enfield, Middlesex: Guinness Publishing. ISBN 0-85112-989-7.
