= Warren Place =

Warren Place is a racing stable in Newmarket, Suffolk, UK operated by Godolphin Racing. It was purchased in 2015 from the family of Sir Henry Cecil.

Warren Place was built by Sam Darling. Noel Murless trained from Warren Place from 1952 to 1976. Henry Cecil took over from his father in law in 1977 until 2013.

Racing silks of Godolphin
