= Crepello =

British-bred Thoroughbred racehorse (1954–1974)

- Sire: Donatello II
- Grandsire: Blenheim
- Dam: Crepuscule
- Damsire: Mieuxce (FR)
- Sex: Stallion
- Foaled: 1954
- Country: Great Britain
- Colour: Chestnut
- Breeder: Eve Stud
- Owner: Sir Victor Sassoon
- Trainer: Noel Murless
- Record: 5: 3-1-0
- Earnings: £34,201

Major wins
- Dewhurst Stakes (1956); 2,000 Guineas (1957); Epsom Derby (1957)

Awards
- Timeform rating: 136; Leading sire in Britain & Ireland (1969); Leading broodmare sire in Britain & Ireland (1974)

Honours
- Deltic locomotive 55012 was named Crepello
- Last updated on 24 March 2024

Crepello (1954–1974) was a British-bred Thoroughbred racehorse. In a short career, he won three Group One races, including the 2000 Guineas and England's most prestigious race, the Epsom Derby, in 1957. Later the horse was a leading sire.

== Pedigree ==
He was a chestnut horse sired by Donatello II (by Blenheim) in his last year of life. His dam was the race winner, and Star mare, Crepuscule by Mieuxce. Crepuscule created a British bloodstock record by producing Classic winners, Honeylight and Crepello as her first two foals. Crepello was a half-brother to Honeylight (won One Thousand Guineas Stakes) and Twilight Alley (Ascot Gold Cup Stakes).

== Racing record ==
Crepello was trained by Noel Murless at Newmarket. He was always ridden by jockey, Lester Piggott. As a two-year-old he finished second in his debut race, the Windsor Castle Stakes, fourth in the Middle Park Stakes and won the Dewhurst Stakes. Due to unsound forelegs, the horse always raced wearing bandages.

At age three Crepello raced only twice but won two Classic Races. The first was the 2,000 Guineas, followed by a victory over future star Ballymoss in the Epsom Derby. Crepello's winning time of 2:35.4 seconds was the fastest since 1936. However, this was to be the great horse's last race. His tendons, always delicate, began to cause significant problems and he missed the King George VI & Queen Elizabeth Stakes before being retired not long before the St Leger Stakes.

He only had five starts but was undefeated in his last three, all of which are now Group One races.

== Stud record ==
Retired to stud at his owner's Eve Stud in Woodditton, Cambridgeshire, Crepello was the leading sire in Great Britain & Ireland in 1969 and the Champion Broodmare sire in 1974. Notable progeny include:

- Busted, unbeaten at four in 1967 and voted the U.K. Horse of the Year, £58,937 sire
- Caergwrle, winner of the 1968 1000 Guineas,
- Mysterious, winner of the 1973 1,000 Guineas and The Oaks
- Celina (Irish Oaks)
- Crepellana (Prix de Diane)
- Crest of the Wave (sire in New Zealand)
- Soderini (stakeswinner, £28,128, sire)
- Bleu Azur, dam of Altesse Royale (Epsom Oaks, One Thousand Guineas, Irish Oaks)
- Marlia, dam of Marduk II which won the German Derby and consecutive runnings of Germany's Grosser Preis von Baden in 1974 and 1975.

Crepello's record as sire was somewhat restricted by the fact that a number of his stock had bad legs and were untrainable.

== Honours ==
Following the London & North Eastern Railway tradition of naming locomotives after winning racehorses, British Railways "Deltic" Diesel locomotive no. D9012 (later 55012) was named after the horse on 4 September 1961, and remained in service until 18 May 1981.
