= Tehran (horse) =

British-bred Thoroughbred racehorse

- Sire: Bois Roussel
- Grandsire: Vatout
- Dam: Stafaralla
- Damsire: Solario
- Sex: Stallion
- Foaled: 1941
- Country: United Kingdom
- Colour: Bay
- Breeder: Aly Khan
- Owner: Aly Khan; Aga Khan III
- Trainer: Frank Butters
- Record: 11: 6-2-1

Major wins
- New St Leger (1944)

Awards
- Leading sire in Great Britain and Ireland (1952)

Tehran (1941–1966) was a British Thoroughbred racehorse and sire, who raced during World War II and was best known for winning the classic St Leger in 1944. After showing little ability as a two-year-old he improved in the following spring to win the Culford Stakes on his three-year-old debut. He ran third in the 2000 Guineas and was narrowly beaten into second place in the Derby Stakes. After winning the Whepstead Stakes he recorded his biggest win when defeating a strong field in a substitute St Leger. He won his first three races in 1945 and finished second in the Ascot Gold Cup. He later became a successful breeding stallion, siring several major winners including Tulyar.

== Background ==
Tehran was a bay horse with a white star and a white coronet marking on his left hind foot bred in the United Kingdom by Prince Aly Khan and owned by him in partnership with his father Aga Khan III. He was sired by Bois Roussel, a French-bred horse who won the 1938 Epsom Derby before becoming a successful breeding stallion. His other progeny included the St Leger winner Ridge Wood and the Prix de l'Arc de Triomphe winner Migoli. Tehran's dam Stafaralla was a successful racehorse and broodmare who won the Cheveley Park Stakes in 1937 and produced the Ebor Handicap winner Norooz. Stafarella was a granddaughter of Miranda, whose other descendants have included Mrs McArdy, Borgia and Foolish Pleasure.

The colt was sent into training with the Aga Khan's veteran trainer Frank Butters at his stable in Newmarket, Suffolk.

Tehran's racing career took place during World War II during which horse racing in Britain was subject to many restrictions. Several major racecourses, including Epsom and Doncaster, were closed for the duration of the conflict, either for safety reasons, or because they were being used by the military. Many important races were rescheduled to new dates and venues, often at short notice, and all five of the Classics were usually run at Newmarket. Wartime austerity also meant that prize money was reduced: Tehran's St Leger was worth £5,467 compared to the £10,465 earned by Scottish Union in 1939.

== Racing career ==
=== 1942: two-year-old season ===
As a two-year-old in 1943 Tehran was slow to mature and failed to win or place in two races. On his second appearance he finished fifth behind Ocean Swell in the Alington Maiden Plate at Newmarket Racecourse on 20 October.

=== 1944: three-year-old season ===
Tehran recorded his first success in the Chelford Stakes over one mile at Newmarket in the spring of 1944. On 17 May the colt was moved up in class to contest the 2000 Guineas, run that year on the July course. Racing in heavy rain, Tehran led until the last quarter mile before being overtaken and finishing third of the twenty-six runners behind the filly Garden Path and Growing Confidence. In his subsequent races he ran in the colours of the Aga Khan.

In the Derby, run on the July course on 17 June, Tehran started at odds of 8/1 in a twenty-runner field and was ridden by Eph Smith. The race was run at a slow pace before the field quickened five furlong from the finish. After what was described as a "great fight" he was beaten a neck by the 28/1 outsider Ocean Swell. On his next appearance, Tehran won the Whepstead Stakes at Newmarket in August.

Doncaster Racecourse, the traditional home of the St Leger was unavailable for racing in 1944 and substitute "New St Leger" was run at Newmarket in September. Ridden by Gordon Richards, Tehran started at odds of 9/2 in a field of seventeen runners which also included Ocean Swell and the filly Hycilla, the winner of the Oaks Stakes, who started favourite. He won by one and a half lengths from Lord Derby's colt Borealis with Ocean Swell third. After the race Richards commented "I made the first forward move and was followed by Harry Wragg on Borealis. Harry must have got almost to Tehran's head but there was no laziness about Tehran and he went on again. Eph Smith joined in on Ocean Swell but they could make no impression on me as I pushed a good horse home. He got a pace just to his liking".

Tehran's earnings of £6,202 meant that Butters won his sixth trainers' championship whilst the Aga Khan was British flat racing Champion Owner for the eighth time.

=== 1945: four-year-old season ===
Tehran remained in training as a four-year-old with the Ascot Gold Cup as his principal objective. He won three minor races as Newmarket in the spring of 1945 but was withdrawn from the substitute Coronation Cup as Butters did not wish to risk the horse on the prevailing hard ground.

On 7 July the Gold Cup was run at Ascot for the first time since 1939 in front of an estimated 60,000 spectators. Tehran had been given what was described as "a real stayer's preparation", being tested in training gallops alongside the Cesarewitch winner Filator. He was, however, unsuited by the firm ground and finished second, one and a half lengths behind the winner Ocean Swell.

In December 1945, Tehran was sold to a syndicate for £25,000 a share, giving him a theoretical value of £100,000 and breaking the record price for a racehorse set when Nearco was syndicated for £62,000.

== Assessment ==
In their book A Century of Champions, based on a modified version of the Timeform system, John Randall and Tony Morris rated Tehran a "superior" winner of the St Leger and the best British-trained horse of his generation.

== Breeding record ==
Tehran was retired from racing to become a breeding stallion. He was not a consistent producer of top-class winners but did produce some very good horses. The best of his progeny was Tulyar, who won the Derby, Eclipse Stakes, King George VI and Queen Elizabeth Stakes and St Leger enabling Tehran to win the title of Leading sire in Great Britain and Ireland in 1952. His other winners included Amante (Irish Oaks), Mystery (Eclipse Stakes), Raise You Ten (Goodwood Cup, Doncaster Cup) and Tabriz (Royal Lodge Stakes, sire of Taboun). Tehran died in 1966 at the age of twenty-five.

== Sire line tree ==
- Tehran
  - Kurdistan
    - Baghdad Note
  - Tabriz
    - Taboun
      - Jour Et Nuit
      - Go Tobann
        - Pele
  - Mystery
  - Tale Of Two Cities
    - Cougar
      - Exploded
      - Gato Del Sol
  - Tulyar
    - Menelek
      - April Seventh
      - Rag Trade
      - Hallo Dandy
      - Bit of a Skite
    - Bahrain
      - Warren Point
      - Airborne
      - The Swan
    - Mako
  - Spoutnik
    - Drapeau Rouge
      - Morgat
  - Raise You Ten
    - Ten Up

== Pedigree ==
Pedigree of Tehran (GB), bay stallion, 1941
Sire Bois Roussel (FR) 1935	Vatout (FR); 1926	Prince Chimay	Chaucer*
Sire Bois Roussel (FR) 1935	Vatout (FR); 1926	Prince Chimay	Gallorette*
Sire Bois Roussel (FR) 1935	Vatout (FR); 1926	Vashti	Sans Souci
Sire Bois Roussel (FR) 1935	Vatout (FR); 1926	Vashti	Vaya
Sire Bois Roussel (FR) 1935	Plucky Liege (GB); 1912	Spearmint	Carbine
Sire Bois Roussel (FR) 1935	Plucky Liege (GB); 1912	Spearmint	Maid of the Mint
Sire Bois Roussel (FR) 1935	Plucky Liege (GB); 1912	Concertina	St Simon*
Sire Bois Roussel (FR) 1935	Plucky Liege (GB); 1912	Concertina	Comic Song
Dam Stafaralla (FR) 1930	Solario (IRE); 1922	Gainsborough	Bayardo
Dam Stafaralla (FR) 1930	Solario (IRE); 1922	Gainsborough	Rosedrop
Dam Stafaralla (FR) 1930	Solario (IRE); 1922	Sun Worship	Sundridge
Dam Stafaralla (FR) 1930	Solario (IRE); 1922	Sun Worship	Doctrine
Dam Stafaralla (FR) 1930	Mirawala (IRE); 1923	Phalaris	Polymelus
Dam Stafaralla (FR) 1930	Mirawala (IRE); 1923	Phalaris	Bromus
Dam Stafaralla (FR) 1930	Mirawala (IRE); 1923	Miranda	Gallinule*
Dam Stafaralla (FR) 1930	Mirawala (IRE); 1923	Miranda	Admiration (Family: 14-b)

* Tehran is inbred 5S x 4S to the stallion St Simon, meaning that he appears fifth generation (via Chaucer) and fourth generation on the sire side of his pedigree.

* Tehran is inbred 5S x 4D to the stallion Gallinule, meaning that he appears fifth generation (via Gallorette) on the sire side of his pedigree and fourth generation on the dam side of his pedigree.
