= Mysterious (horse) =

British-bred Thoroughbred racehorse

- Racing silks of George Pope, jr
- Sire: Crepello
- Grandsire: Donatello
- Dam: Hill Shade
- Damsire: Hillary
- Sex: Mare
- Foaled: 1970
- Country: United Kingdom
- Colour: Chestnut
- Breeder: George Pope Jr.
- Owner: George Pope Jr.
- Trainer: Noel Murless
- Record: 8: 5-2-0

Major wins
- Cherry Hinton Stakes (1972); Fred Darling Stakes (1973); 1000 Guineas (1973); Epsom Oaks (1973); Yorkshire Oaks (1973)

Honours
- Timeform rating 127

Mysterious (1970–1988) was a British Thoroughbred racehorse. In a racing career lasting from July 1972 until October 1973 she ran eight times and won five races. Mysterious won Group races on her first four racecourse appearances including the Classic 1000 Guineas at Newmarket Racecourse and Oaks at Epsom. She later finished second to Dahlia in the Irish Oaks at the Curragh and won the Yorkshire Oaks at York.

== Background ==
Mysterious was a chestnut filly with a narrow white blaze and white socks on her hind feet, bred in England by the California-based George Pope, Jr and raised at the Cliff Stud near Helmsley in Yorkshire. She was sired by The Derby winner Crepello out of Hill Shade an American-bred mare. Hill Shade won the Nassau Stakes and the Sun Chariot Stakes when trained in Britain and spent most of her breeding career in the United States where she produced several other winners including J. O. Tobin.

Mysterious was sent into training with Noel Murless at his Warren Place stables in Newmarket, Suffolk.

== Racing career ==
Mysterious bypassed maiden races, beginning her career in the Group Three Cherry Hinton Stakes over six furlongs at the Newmarket July meeting. She won the race from two opponents but did not appear again in 1972.

Mysterious made her first appearance as a three-year-old in the Group Three Fred Darling Stakes over seven furlongs at Newbury Racecourse. She defeated the Irish-trained favourite Grasse by three quarters of a length to take the event, a recognised trial for the 1000 Guineas. At Newmarket Mysterious was ridden as usual by Geoff Lewis and started at odds of 11/1 for the 1000 Guineas, with the Cheveley Park Stakes winner Jacinth being made odds-on favourite. Lewis sent Mysterious into the lead two furlongs from the finish and she won decisively, beating Jacinth by three lengths. Her win gave Murless a sixth success in the race, setting a 20th-century record.

At Epsom a month later, Mysterious started 13/8 favourite for the Epsom Oaks against nine other fillies. Lewis restrained the filly in the early stages, before moving up along the inside to take the lead in the straight. Mysterious retained her undefeated record, winning easily by four lengths from Where You Lead. Mysterious started 1/2 favourite for the Irish Oaks in July, but was beaten three lengths by the French-trained filly Dahlia. Later that month Dahlia was a six length winner of Britain's most prestigious all-aged race, the King George VI and Queen Elizabeth Stakes. In the Yorkshire Oaks in August, Mysterious won comfortably from Virunga, a French filly who had finished second to Dahlia in the Prix Saint-Alary.

Mysterious failed to reproduce her best form in her remaining two starts. She started odds-on favourite for the Sun Chariot Stakes but was beaten by Cheveley Princess, her only rival in a two-runner race. In October she finished sixth in the Champion Stakes at Newmarket.

== Retirement ==
Mysterious spent her breeding career in the United States where she was bred to leading stallions including Northern Dancer, Mr. Prospector and Nijinsky. She produced several winners, but nothing approaching top class. Her most successful descendant has been Quest, whose wins included the Clark Handicap.

== Assessment and honours ==
Mysterious was given a Timeform rating of 127.

In their book, A Century of Champions, based on the Timeform rating system, John Randall and Tony Morris rated Mysterious an "average" winner of the 1000 Guineas and Oaks.

== Pedigree ==
Pedigree of Mysterious (GB), chestnut mare, 1970
Sire Crepello (GB) 1954	Donatello; 1934	Blenheim	Blandford
Sire Crepello (GB) 1954	Donatello; 1934	Blenheim	Malva
Sire Crepello (GB) 1954	Donatello; 1934	Delleana	Clarissimus
Sire Crepello (GB) 1954	Donatello; 1934	Delleana	Duccia di Buoninsegna
Sire Crepello (GB) 1954	Crepuscule; 1948	Mieuxce	Massine
Sire Crepello (GB) 1954	Crepuscule; 1948	Mieuxce	L'Olivete
Sire Crepello (GB) 1954	Crepuscule; 1948	Red Sunset	Solario
Sire Crepello (GB) 1954	Crepuscule; 1948	Red Sunset	Dulce
Dam Hill Shade (USA) 1965	Hillary; 1952	Khaled	Hyperion
Dam Hill Shade (USA) 1965	Hillary; 1952	Khaled	Eclair
Dam Hill Shade (USA) 1965	Hillary; 1952	Snow Bunny	Boswell
Dam Hill Shade (USA) 1965	Hillary; 1952	Snow Bunny	The Rose
Dam Hill Shade (USA) 1965	Penumbra; 1955	Imperium	Piping Rock
Dam Hill Shade (USA) 1965	Penumbra; 1955	Imperium	Imperatrice
Dam Hill Shade (USA) 1965	Penumbra; 1955	Moonrise	Moonlight Run
Dam Hill Shade (USA) 1965	Penumbra; 1955	Moonrise	Seventh Heaven (Family:3-m)
