= Caergwrle (horse) =

British-bred Thoroughbred racehorse

- Sire: Crepello
- Grandsire: Donatello
- Dam: Caerphilly
- Damsire: Abernant
- Sex: Mare
- Foaled: 1965
- Country: United Kingdom
- Colour: Chestnut
- Breeder: Gwen Murless
- Owner: Gwen Murless
- Trainer: Noel Murless
- Record: 6: 3-2-1

Major wins
- 1000 Guineas Trial Stakes (1968); 1000 Guineas (1968)

Caergwrle (foaled 1965) was a British Thoroughbred racehorse. In a racing career lasting from July 1967 until June 1968, the filly ran six times and won three races. After winning once as a two-year-old she showed improved form in the spring of 1968 to win the Classic 1000 Guineas at Newmarket Racecourse. Caergwrle was beaten in her only subsequent race and was retired to stud, where she had limited success as a broodmare.

== Background ==
Caergwrle was a chestnut filly bred at the Cliff Stud in Yorkshire by Gwen Murless, the wife of the leading British trainer Noel Murless. Her sire Crepello won the 1957 Epsom Derby before becoming a successful sire of winners. Caergwrle's dam, Caerphilly, was a sprinter who won three races and finished third in the 1962 edition of the five furlong King George Stakes. Apart from Caergwrle, Caerphilly also produced St Chad, a colt who won the Wills Mile in 1967. As descendants of the broodmare Malapert, Caerphilly and Caergwrle were closely related to the 2000 Guineas winner Pall Mall.

Caergwrle, who was named after a Welsh village, was trained by Noel Murless at his Warren Place stables at Newmarket, Suffolk.

== Racing career ==
Caergwrle made her first racecourse appearance in the Star Stakes over five furlongs at Sandown Park in May. She ran promisingly to finish second to Fairy Path. In July Caergwrle started 2/5 favourite for the Findon Stakes at Goodwood Racecourse. She was regarded as a near certainty to win and was the subject of heavy betting on The Tote but lost her chance when she bolted before the race and galloped several furlongs at top speed before being caught. She eventually finished well beaten behind Fridoline. In September she recorded her first win when she won a five furlong maiden race at Chester.

On her three-year-old debut, Caergwrle showed vastly improved form when she won the seven furlong 1000 Guineas Trial Stakes at Kempton Park by four lengths. In the 1000 Guineas over Newmarket's Rowley Mile, Caergwrle was made 4/1 favourite in a field of fourteen fillies. Ridden by the nineteen-year-old Sandy Barclay, she won by a length from Photo Flash, with Sovereign a neck away in third. A month later, Caerwrle was sent to Epsom for the Ebbisham Stakes over 8 1/2 furlongs. She was beaten a length by Ileana, who was carrying four pounds less. Caergwrle never ran again and was retired to stud.

== Retirement ==
Caergwrle remained in the Murless family's ownership throughout her breeding career. She produced several winners, but none at a high level. Her most successful offspring, foaled when she was twenty-one years old, was St Ninian who won seven races, including the Jubilee Handicap at Kempton Park. The descendants of Caerwrle's daughter Cricceith had some success in New Zealand, the most notable being Batavian, who won the Great Northern Foal Stakes and the Hawke's Bay Guineas.

Stud Record:

1970 Corwen (GB): Bay gelding, by St. Paddy. Did not place in 10 starts.

1971 Caer-Gai (GB): Chestnut filly, by Royal Palace (GB) - Won one race and placed once from 5 starts in England 1974-5

1973 Caerinion (GB): Chestnut filly, foaled 20 February, by Royal Palace (GB) - placed second once from 4 starts in England 1975–6.

1974 Unnamed (GB): Bay colt, by Welsh Pageant. This colt never raced.

1975 Chop Gate (GB): Chestnut gelding, by Connaught. Won once in 14 starts.

1977 Claerwen (GB): Chestnut filly, by Habat. Was second in the 1979 Molecomb Stakes and died in 1993.

1981 Cwrle (GB): Chestnut filly, by Habat. Did not place in five starts.

1982 Cricceith (GB): Chestnut filly, by Brigadier Gerard (GB) - placed second once from 5 starts in England 1985–6.

1983 Cynwyd (GB): Bay filly, by Imperial Fling. Did not race.

1984 Abergwrle (GB): Grey filly, foaled 1 January, by Absalom (GB) - Unplaced in 2 starts in England 1986 and died in 2002.

1986 St Ninian (GB): Chestnut colt, foaled 27 May, by Ardross (IRE) - won 7 races and placed eleven times including the Newbury Spring Cup (Handicap); Jubilee Handicap, Kempton; 2nd LR Strensall Stakes, York and 3rd LR Ben Marshall Stakes, Newmarket from 40 starts in England 1988–93.

== Assessment and honours ==
In their book, A Century of Champions, based on the Timeform rating system, John Randall and Tony Morris rated Caergwrle a "poor" winner of the 1000 Guineas.

== Pedigree ==
Pedigree of Caergwrle (GB), chestnut mare, 1965
Sire Crepello (GB) 1954	Donatello; 1934	Blenheim	Blandford
Sire Crepello (GB) 1954	Donatello; 1934	Blenheim	Malva
Sire Crepello (GB) 1954	Donatello; 1934	Delleana	Clarissimus
Sire Crepello (GB) 1954	Donatello; 1934	Delleana	Duccia di Buoninsegna
Sire Crepello (GB) 1954	Crepuscule; 1948	Mieuxce	Massine
Sire Crepello (GB) 1954	Crepuscule; 1948	Mieuxce	L'Olivete
Sire Crepello (GB) 1954	Crepuscule; 1948	Red Sunset	Solario
Sire Crepello (GB) 1954	Crepuscule; 1948	Red Sunset	Dulce
Dam Caerphilly (USA) 1959	Abernant; 1946	Owen Tudor	Hyperion
Dam Caerphilly (USA) 1959	Abernant; 1946	Owen Tudor	Mary Tudor
Dam Caerphilly (USA) 1959	Abernant; 1946	Rustom Mahal	Rustom Pasha
Dam Caerphilly (USA) 1959	Abernant; 1946	Rustom Mahal	Mumtaz Mahal
Dam Caerphilly (USA) 1959	Cheetah; 1954	Big Game	Bahram
Dam Caerphilly (USA) 1959	Cheetah; 1954	Big Game	Myrobella
Dam Caerphilly (USA) 1959	Cheetah; 1954	Malapert	Portlaw
Dam Caerphilly (USA) 1959	Cheetah; 1954	Malapert	Malatesta (Family:7-d)
