= Bois Roussel =

French-bred Thoroughbred racehorse

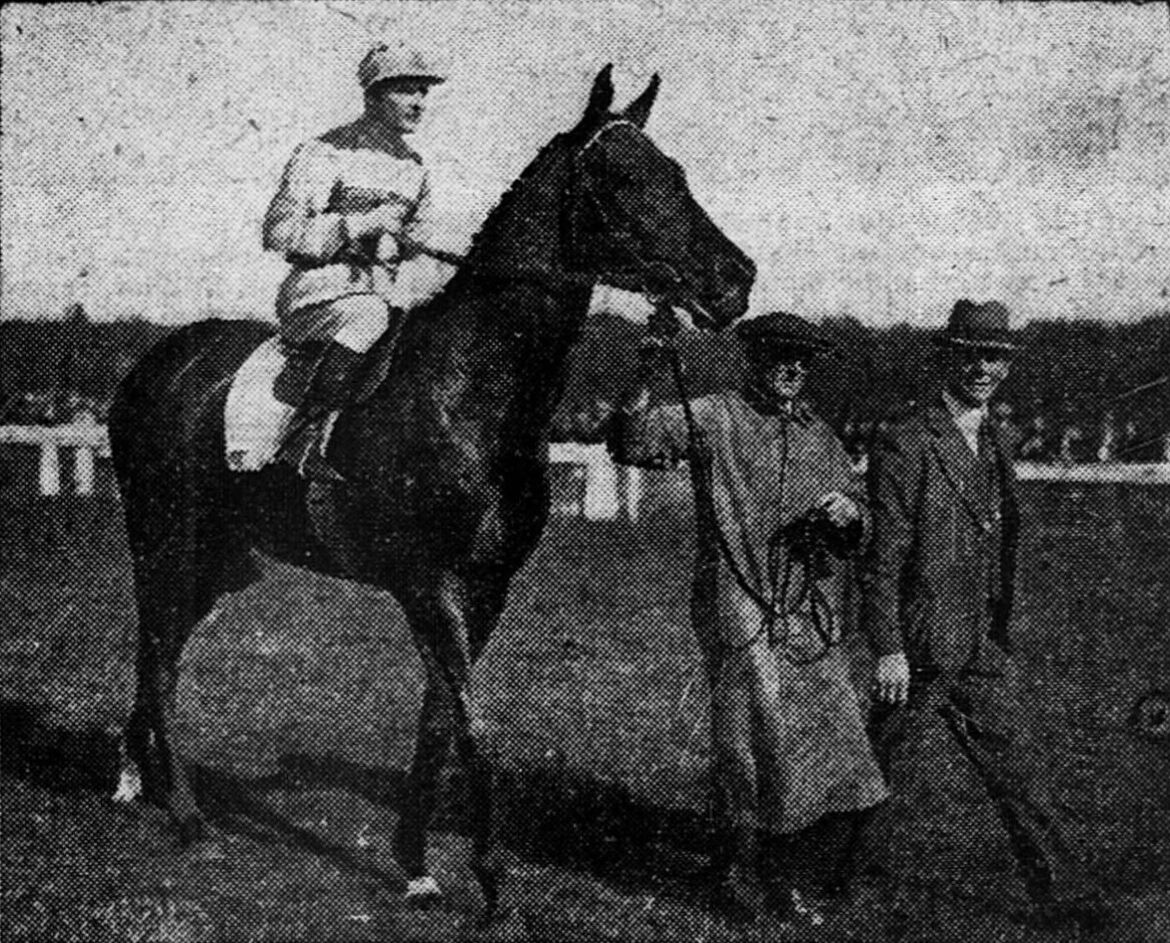
- 1938 Epsom Derby
- Sire: Vatout
- Grandsire: Prince Chimay (GB)
- Dam: Plucky Liege (GB)
- Damsire: Spearmint
- Sex: Stallion
- Foaled: 1935
- Died: 1955 (aged 19–20)
- Country: France
- Colour: Brown
- Breeder: Leon Volterra
- Owner: 1) Leon Volterra; 2) Hon. Peter Beatty
- Trainer: Fred Darling
- Record: 3: 2-0-1
- Earnings: £9,228¾ plus 105,600 ff

Major wins
- Prix Juigné (1938); Epsom Derby (1938)

Awards
- Leading broodmare sire in Great Britain & Ireland (1959, 1960)
- Last updated on 31 October 2011

Bois Roussel (1935–1955) was a French-bred Thoroughbred champion racehorse and a leading broodmare sire. He won the 1938 Epsom Derby on his second racecourse appearance.

== Background ==
He was named for Haras du Bois-Roussel, the breeding farm in Alençon where he was foaled. His breeder was Leon Volterra who acquired his sire, Vatout, and his dam as part of his purchase of Haras du Bois Roussel from American, Jefferson Davis Cohn. According to Thoroughbred Heritage, his dam, Plucky Liege, was one of the most important broodmares of the 20th century. At the time of foaling Bois Roussel, Plucky Liege was 23 years old.

== Racing career ==
Bois Roussel did not start as a two-year-old. Raced at age three by Leon Volterra, he made his racing debut in early 1938 at Longchamp Racecourse in Paris, winning the Prix Juigné, an event for unraced colts and geldings. Shortly thereafter, Volterra sold Bois Roussel for £8,000 to the Hon. Peter Beatty, son of Admiral David Beatty and grandson of Chicago department store magnate, Marshall Field.

His new owner sent Bois Roussel to England to run in June's Epsom Derby. Making just the second start of his career, bettors sent the colt off at 20/1 odds. Ridden by jockey Charlie Elliott Bois Roussel scored an upset victory in England's most prestigious race. He was slowly away and among the back markers entering the straight. In the final quarter mile he produced what the Glasgow Herald described as "an astonishing burst of speed" to come from well off the pace and take the lead inside the final furlong. He won going away by four lengths from Scottish Union and the favourite Pasch. In winning, he earned more in prize money than Beatty had paid for him.

In his only other race start, Bois Roussel ran third to the undefeated Nearco in the Grand Prix de Paris.

== Stud record ==
Bois Roussel was rested as a four-year-old and went to stud in stud duty in England, in 1940 at a fee of 300 guineas. His stud career was satisfactory without being spectacular. Among his progeny were:

- Castagnola (dam of Zucchero who won ten races value £14,837)
- Delville Wood (1942) – four wins worth £3,020, five-time leading sire in Australia
- Edie Kelly dam of St. Paddy (1957) – won Epsom Derby, St. Leger Stakes
- Fraise du Bois II (1948) – won Irish Derby
- French Beige – won Doncaster Cup
- Hikaru Meiji (JPN) Tokyo Yushun (Derby)
- Hindostan (1946) – won Irish Derby, seven-time Leading sire in Japan
- Migoli (1944) – won £22,950 in England plus 5,209,500 francs in France including the Prix de l'Arc de Triomphe, sired Belmont Stakes winner Gallant Man
- Fraise du Bois (three wins value £11,226 and second in the St. Leger)
- Ridge Wood (1946) – won seven races, £21,658 including the St. Leger Stakes
- Star of Iran dam of Petite Etoile (1956) - wins included The Oaks, 1,000 Guineas Stakes, and the Coronation Cup twice
- Swallow Tail (six wins value £12,440, third in the Derby and exported to Brazil)
- Tehran (1941) – won £7,258 including St. Leger Stakes, leading sire in Great Britain and Ireland (1952), sired Tulyar
- Woodburn (1945) – winner of the Yorkshire Cup and Cesarewitch Handicap.
- Last but not least he is the great grandfather of Red Rum, the three-time winner of the Aintree Grand National.

He was not a leading sire but was second on the list of sires of winners in both 1947 and 1949. Bois Roussel's daughters were also outstanding producers who made him the Leading broodmare sire in Great Britain & Ireland in 1959 and 1960.

Bois Roussel died in October 1955, in France at age 20 because of severe laminitis.

== Sire line tree ==
- Bois Roussel
  - Renwood
    - Goodbye
  - Tehran
    - Kurdistan
      - Baghdad Note
    - Tabriz
      - Taboun
        - Jour Et Nuit
        - Go Tobann
    - Mystery
    - Tale Of Two Cities
      - Cougar
        - Exploded
        - Gato Del Sol
    - Tulyar
      - Menelek
        - April Seventh
        - Rag Trade
        - Hallo Dandy
        - Bit of a Skite
      - Bahrain
        - Warren Point
        - Airborne
        - The Swan
      - Mako
    - Spoutnik
      - Drapeau Rouge
        - Morgat
    - Raise You Ten
      - Ten Up
  - Delville Wood
    - Forest Beau
    - Hydrogen
    - Lord Forest
    - Belmont Park
    - Electro
    - Nargoon
    - Forestville
    - Prince Delville
    - Noble Archer
    - Caesar
  - Migoli
    - Gallant Man
      - Gallant Romeo
        - Gallant Bob
        - Elocutionist
  - Woodburn
  - Hindostan
    - Shinzan
      - Miho Shinzan
        - My Shinzan
  - Ridge Wood
  - Swallow Tail
  - Royal Forest
  - Fraise du Bois
  - French Beige
  - Hikaru Meiji

== Pedigree ==
Pedigree of Bois Roussel (FR), brown stallion, 1935
Sire Vatout (FR) B. 1926	Prince Chimay (GB); Ch. 1915	Chaucer	St Simon*
Sire Vatout (FR) B. 1926	Prince Chimay (GB); Ch. 1915	Chaucer	Canterbury Pilgrim
Sire Vatout (FR) B. 1926	Prince Chimay (GB); Ch. 1915	Gallorette	Gallinule*
Sire Vatout (FR) B. 1926	Prince Chimay (GB); Ch. 1915	Gallorette	Orlet
Sire Vatout (FR) B. 1926	Vashti (FR); B. 1921	Sans Souci	Le Roi Soleil
Sire Vatout (FR) B. 1926	Vashti (FR); B. 1921	Sans Souci	Sanctimony
Sire Vatout (FR) B. 1926	Vashti (FR); B. 1921	Vaya	Beppo
Sire Vatout (FR) B. 1926	Vashti (FR); B. 1921	Vaya	Waterhen*
Dam Plucky Liege (GB) B. 1912	Spearmint (GB); B. 1903	Carbine (NZ)	Musket
Dam Plucky Liege (GB) B. 1912	Spearmint (GB); B. 1903	Carbine (NZ)	Mersey
Dam Plucky Liege (GB) B. 1912	Spearmint (GB); B. 1903	Maid of the Mint	Minting
Dam Plucky Liege (GB) B. 1912	Spearmint (GB); B. 1903	Maid of the Mint	Warble
Dam Plucky Liege (GB) B. 1912	Concertina (GB); B. 1896	St Simon*	Galopin
Dam Plucky Liege (GB) B. 1912	Concertina (GB); B. 1896	St Simon*	St Angela
Dam Plucky Liege (GB) B. 1912	Concertina (GB); B. 1896	Comic Song	Petrarch
Dam Plucky Liege (GB) B. 1912	Concertina (GB); B. 1896	Comic Song	Frivolity (Family: 16-a)

* Bois Roussel is inbred 4S x 3D to the stallion St Simon, meaning that he appears fourth generation on the sire side of his pedigree and third generation on the dam side of his pedigree.

* Bois Roussel is inbred 4S x 5S to the stallion Gallinule, meaning that he appears fourth generation and fifth generation (via Waterhen) on the sire side of his pedigree.

== See also ==
List of leading Thoroughbred racehorses
