= Rag Trade (horse) =

British-bred Thoroughbred racehorsee

- Racing silks of Pierre Raymond
- Sire: Menelek
- Grandsire: Tulyar
- Dam: The Rage
- Damsire: Cagire
- Sex: Gelding
- Foaled: 1966
- Country: United Kingdom
- Colour: Chestnut
- Breeder: Ian Williams
- Owner: Pierre Raymond
- Trainer: Fred Rimell

Major wins
- Midlands Grand National (1975); Welsh Grand National (1976); Grand National (1976)

Rag Trade (1966–1978) was a British-bred Thoroughbred racehorse who competed in National Hunt racing.

He is best known for winning the 1976 Grand National, denying Red Rum a third victory.

== Background ==
Sired in Ireland by Menelek out of The Rage, Rag Trade was bred by Ian Williams, the son of Evan Williams who had won the 1937 Grand National on Royal Mail.

== Racing career ==
Rag Trade's first trainer was George Fairbairn but by the time he was nine years old his racing record was poor, having only won two races. Due to this he was put up for sale in 1975 and was bought by Pierre Raymond Bessone for 18,000 guineas, in a public auction at Doncaster.

Bessone later sold two 25% shares in the horse to businessmen William Lawrie and Herbert Keane. With trainer Arthur Pitt the horse ran the 1975 Grand National under up-and-coming jockey John Francome. However, the lack of preparation was evident and Rag Trade could only finish in tenth place.

However, following the National Rag Trade quickly improved and three weeks later he won the Midlands Grand National at Uttoexeter before he was sent to trainer Fred Rimell at his Kinnersley stables.

With Rimell as trainer and under stable jockey John Burke, Rag Trade had a successful 1976 with five wins including the Welsh Grand National at Chepstow.

Rag Trade started the 1976 Grand National with odds of 14-1 facing against Red Rum.

Rag Trade started the race well but was in contention for the lead with four other horses approaching the last fence. Red Rum was leading with Rag Trade close behind, but Rag Trade accelerated to gain a four-length advantage over the heavier Red Rum. Rag Trade held this lead to the finish to win the race.

Rag Trade ran in the 1978 Grand National under new trainer George Fairbairn and jockey Jonjo O'Neill. He started the race as 8/1 favourite but pulled up lame during the second circuit before fence 22, after which he was euthanised.

== Grand National record ==
Grand National	Position	Jockey	Age	Weight	SP	Distance
1975	10th	John Francome	9	10-4	18/1	Last to complete
1976	1st	John Burke	10	10-12	14/1	
1978	DNF	Jonjo O'Neill	12	11-3	8/1 F	Pulled up after fence 21

== Pedigree ==
Pedigree of Rag Trade (GB), chestnut gelding, 1966
Sire Menelek (IRE) 1957	Tulyar (IRE); 1949	Tehran (GB)	Bois Roussel
Sire Menelek (IRE) 1957	Tulyar (IRE); 1949	Tehran (GB)	Stafaralla
Sire Menelek (IRE) 1957	Tulyar (IRE); 1949	Neocracy (GB)	Nearco (ITA)
Sire Menelek (IRE) 1957	Tulyar (IRE); 1949	Neocracy (GB)	Harina
Sire Menelek (IRE) 1957	Queen of Sheba (GE); 1948	Persian Gulf (GB)	Bahram
Sire Menelek (IRE) 1957	Queen of Sheba (GE); 1948	Persian Gulf (GB)	Double Life
Sire Menelek (IRE) 1957	Queen of Sheba (GE); 1948	Ojala (GB)	Buen Ojo
Sire Menelek (IRE) 1957	Queen of Sheba (GE); 1948	Ojala (GB)	Dursilla
Dam The Rage 1954	Cagire (FRA); 1947	Tourbillon (FRA)	Ksar
Dam The Rage 1954	Cagire (FRA); 1947	Tourbillon (FRA)	Durban
Dam The Rage 1954	Cagire (FRA); 1947	Source Sucree (FRA)	Admiral Drake
Dam The Rage 1954	Cagire (FRA); 1947	Source Sucree (FRA)	Lavendula
Dam The Rage 1954	Rage Bleue; 1944	Plassy (GB)	Bosworth
Dam The Rage 1954	Rage Bleue; 1944	Plassy (GB)	Pladda
Dam The Rage 1954	Rage Bleue; 1944	Blue Iras	Blue Skies
Dam The Rage 1954	Rage Bleue; 1944	Blue Iras	Iras
