= Queenpot =

British-bred Thoroughbred racehorse

- Sire: Big Game
- Grandsire: Bahram
- Dam: Poker Chip
- Damsire: The Recorder
- Sex: Mare
- Foaled: 1945
- Country: United Kingdom
- Colour: Bay
- Breeder: Percy Loraine
- Owner: Percy Loraine
- Trainer: Fred Darling; Noel Murless

Major wins
- Prendergast Stakes(1947); Katheryn Howard Stakes (1948); 1000 Guineas (1948)

Queenpot (1945 – 1968) was a British Thoroughbred racehorse and broodmare. She won three times as a juvenile in 1947, with her biggest success of the year coming in the Prendergast Stakes at Newmarket Racecourse. In the following spring she took the Katheryn Howard Stakes before recording her most significant victory in the 1000 Guineas. As a broodmare she produced several minor winners including the dam of Northjet.

== Background ==
Queenpot was a bay mare bred and owned by the British diplomat Percy Loraine. She was initially sent into training with Fred Darling at Beckhampton in Wiltshire.

She was from the second crop of foals sired by Big Game the best British colt of his generation, whose wins included the 2000 Guineas and the Champion Stakes. As a breeding stallion, his other progeny included Combat and the Epsom Oaks winner Ambiguity. Her dam Poker Chip produced several other winners and was a half-sister to the Irish 2000 Guineas winner Khosro.

== Racing career ==
=== 1947: two-year-old season ===
As a juvenile in 1947 Queenpot recorded her first win of say importance when she took the Champagne Stakes at Salisbury Racecourse and went on to win a race at Goodwood. In Doncaster's Champagne Stakes in September she produced a good performance in defeat as she finished third behind the colts Lerins and Pride of India (Dewhurst Stakes). She was again matched against male opposition in the Prendergast takes over five furlongs at Newmarket Racecourse in October and won from Final Set with Pride of India in third.

Fred Darling retired at the end of the year and the Beckhampton stable was taken over by Noel Murless.

=== 1948: three-year-old season ===
Queenpot began her second season in April when she won the Katheryn Howard Stakes at Hurst Park. On 30 April Queenpot started the 6/1 second favourite behind the Aga Khan's Masaka in the 135th running of the 1000 Guineas over the Rowley Mile. Ridden by Gordon Richards, she won by a head from Ariostar, with one and a half lengths back to Duplicity in third.

== Assessment and honours ==
In their book, A Century of Champions, based on the Timeform rating system, John Randall and Tony Morris rated Queenpot an "inferior" winner of the 1000 Guineas.

== Breeding record ==
Queenpot was retired from racing to become a broodmare for her owner's stud. She produced at least twelve foals and several minor winners between 1950 and 1966:

- Beau Brocade, a colt, foaled in 1950, sired by Watling Street
- Archduchess, brown filly, 1951, by Nearco
- Desdemona, filly, 1952, by Dante
- Dabernon, colt (later gelded), 1953, by Abernant
- Queens Tankard, bay colt, 1954, by Tantieme
- Katharine Parr, black filly, 1955, by Owen Tudor
- Emley Moor, grey colt, 1956, by Abernant. Winner.
- Ace of Clubs, grey colt, 1959, by Djebe
- Sacharissa, brown filly, 1961, by Zucchero
- Royal Ridge, bay colt, 1962, by Vimy. Winner.
- Jack Knife, brown colt (gelded), 1965, by Prudent
- Jellatina, bay filly, 1966, by Fortino. Winner, dam of Northjet.

Queenpot died in 1968.

== Pedigree ==
Pedigree of Queenpot (GB), bay mare, 1945
| Sire Big Game (GB) 1939 | Bahram; 1932 | Blandford (IRE) | Swynford (GB) |
| Sire Big Game (GB) 1939 | Bahram; 1932 | Blandford (IRE) | Blanche |
| Sire Big Game (GB) 1939 | Bahram; 1932 | Friar's Daughter | Friar Marcus (IRE) |
| Sire Big Game (GB) 1939 | Bahram; 1932 | Friar's Daughter | Garron Lass |
| Sire Big Game (GB) 1939 | Myrobella (IRE); 1930 | Tetratema (GB) | The Tetrarch (IRE) |
| Sire Big Game (GB) 1939 | Myrobella (IRE); 1930 | Tetratema (GB) | Scotch Gift (IRE) |
| Sire Big Game (GB) 1939 | Myrobella (IRE); 1930 | Dolabella | White Eagle (GB) |
| Sire Big Game (GB) 1939 | Myrobella (IRE); 1930 | Dolabella | Gondolette (GB) |
| Dam Poker Chip (GB) 1937 | The Recorder; 1925 | Captain Cuttle | Hurry On |
| Dam Poker Chip (GB) 1937 | The Recorder; 1925 | Captain Cuttle | Bellavista |
| Dam Poker Chip (GB) 1937 | The Recorder; 1925 | Lady Juror | Son-in-Law |
| Dam Poker Chip (GB) 1937 | The Recorder; 1925 | Lady Juror | Lady Josephine |
| Dam Poker Chip (GB) 1937 | Straight Sequence (IRE); 1929 | Stratford (GB) | Swynford |
| Dam Poker Chip (GB) 1937 | Straight Sequence (IRE); 1929 | Stratford (GB) | Lesbia |
| Dam Poker Chip (GB) 1937 | Straight Sequence (IRE); 1929 | Little Flutter (GB) | Flying Orb (IRE) |
| Dam Poker Chip (GB) 1937 | Straight Sequence (IRE); 1929 | Little Flutter (GB) | Nesta (IRE) (Family 22) |
