= Plucky Liege =

British-bred Thoroughbred racehorse

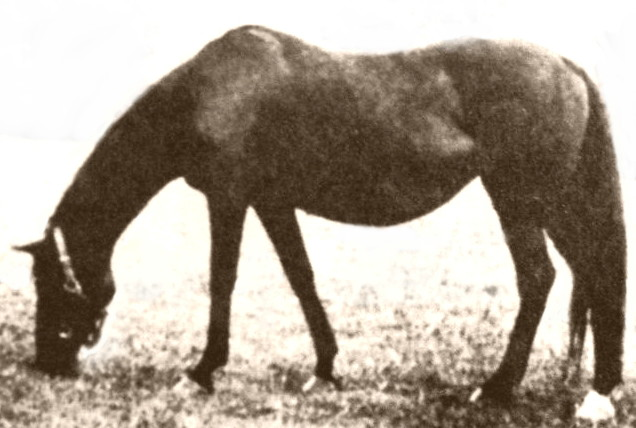
- Sire: Spearmint (GB)
- Grandsire: Carbine (NZ)
- Dam: Concertina
- Damsire: St. Simon
- Sex: Mare
- Foaled: 1912
- Died: 1937 (aged 24–25)
- Country: Great Britain
- Colour: Bay
- Breeder: Lord Michelham
- Owner: Jefferson Davis Cohn
- Record: 13: 4-?-?
- Earnings: £1,811
- Last updated on 22 July 2011

Plucky Liege (1912–1937) was a British Thoroughbred racemare who produced eleven winners, including an Epsom Derby winner at the age of twenty-three and three British Classic race winners. The performances of these horses led to her becoming one of the most important broodmares of the 20th century.

Foaled in England, Plucky Liege was bred by Lord Michelham. She was sired by Spearmint, a winner of the two major races in England and France at the time, the 1906 Epsom Derby and the Grand Prix de Paris. Her dam, Concertina, was un-raced daughter of the leading sire, St. Simon who was one of the most successful sires in history. Concertina was the dam of nine winners, but none of them were top class racehorses. Plucky Liege had three crosses of Stockwell and four crosses of Touchstone in her pedigree.

== Racing career ==
Plucky Liege was purchased by Jefferson Davis Cohn for whom she had thirteen race starts, winning four two-year-old races for earnings of £1,811.

== Stud record ==
In 1930 she was exported to Lower Normandy in France and retired to broodmare duty at Cohn's Haras du Bois-Roussel in Alençon, France. Here Plucky Liege produced twelve foals of which eleven were winners. According to Thoroughbred Heritage, "nearly every major runner in the world today carries at least one strain of Plucky Liege."

Plucky Liege produced the following important progeny:

- Admiral Drake (1931) won French Grand Prix de Paris, sired Phil Drake(Epsom Derby)
- Bois Roussel (b. 1935) - English Champion Three-Year-Old Colt, won the Epsom Derby, was Leading broodmare sire in Great Britain & Ireland. Among others, he was the sire of Tehran and Migoli.
- Bull Dog (b. 1927) - Leading sire in North America (1943), Leading broodmare sire in North America (1953, 1954, 1956)
- Diane de Poitiers who was her only non-winner, dam of winners in U.S.
- Marguerite de Valois (1919, four wins and dam of winners in France and U.S.);
- Noble Lady (two wins);
- Noor Jahan (three wins in France, dam and grandam of good winners);
- Sir Gallahad III (b. 1920) - Leading sire in North America (1930, 1933, 1934, 1940), Leading broodmare sire in North America, (1939, 1943–1952, 1955) .

In October 1933, Jefferson Davis Cohn sold his racing operations, including Plucky Liege, to Leon Volterra. In 1935, Plucky Liege had reached the mature age of twenty-three when foaling future Epsom Derby winner Bois Roussel. She died in 1937 at age twenty-five.

Plucky Liege was recorded as French Star Mare, by Denis Craig in his book, Breeding Racehorses from Cluster Mares.

== Pedigree ==
Pedigree of Plucky Liege (GB), bay mare, 1912
Sire Spearmint (GB) 1903	Carbine (NZ); 1885	Musket	Toxophilite
Sire Spearmint (GB) 1903	Carbine (NZ); 1885	Musket	West Australian Mare
Sire Spearmint (GB) 1903	Carbine (NZ); 1885	Mersey	Knowsley
Sire Spearmint (GB) 1903	Carbine (NZ); 1885	Mersey	Clemence
Sire Spearmint (GB) 1903	Maid of the Mint (GB); 1897	Minting	Lord Lyon
Sire Spearmint (GB) 1903	Maid of the Mint (GB); 1897	Minting	Mint Sauce
Sire Spearmint (GB) 1903	Maid of the Mint (GB); 1897	Warble	Skylark
Sire Spearmint (GB) 1903	Maid of the Mint (GB); 1897	Warble	Coturnix
Dam Concertina (GB) 1896	St. Simon	Galopin	Vedette
Dam Concertina (GB) 1896	St. Simon	Galopin	Flying Duchess
Dam Concertina (GB) 1896	St. Simon	St. Angela	King Tom
Dam Concertina (GB) 1896	St. Simon	St. Angela	Adeline
Dam Concertina (GB) 1896	Comic Song	Petrarch	Lord Clifden
Dam Concertina (GB) 1896	Comic Song	Petrarch	Laura
Dam Concertina (GB) 1896	Comic Song	Frivolity	Macaroni
Dam Concertina (GB) 1896	Comic Song	Frivolity	Miss Agnes
