= Melchbourne (horse) =

British-bred Thoroughbred racehorse

- Sire: Forlorn River
- Grandsire: Fighting Don
- Dam: False Evidence
- Damsire: Counsel
- Sex: Mare
- Foaled: 1971
- Country: United Kingdom
- Colour: Bay
- Breeder: Pearl Lawson Johnston
- Owner: Pearl Lawson Johnston
- Trainer: Bruce Hobbs
- Record: 11:7-0-1

Major wins
- Harry Rosebery Trophy (1973)

Awards
- Timeform rating 125 (1973), 121 (1974); Top-rated British Two-year-old filly (1973); Timeform Best Two-year-old filly (1973)

Melchbourne (foaled 1971) was a British Thoroughbred racehorse and broodmare. Despite never winning a Group race, she was the top-rated filly of her generation in Britain in 1973, when she won six of her eight races, many of them by wide margins. She won once from three starts in the following year.

== Background ==
Melchbourne was a "lengthy, shapely" bay mare with a narrow white blae bred in Suffolk by her owner Pearl Lawson Johnston. She was sired by Forlorn River, a high-class sprinter who won the July Cup, Nunthorpe Stakes and Challenge Stakes in 1967. Melchbourne's dam, False Evidence, was of no use as a racehorse, failing to win in fifteen starts on the flat and four over hurdles but was a successful broodmare, going on to produce Cry of Truth. Miss Lawson Johnston, a Master of Foxhounds and Justice of the peace, sent her filly into training with Bruce Hobbs at the Palace House stable in Newmarket, Suffolk.

== Racing career ==
=== 1973: two-year-old season ===
On her racecourse debut, Melchbourne made little impression, finishing unplaced in a maiden race at Newmarket Racecourse but then won four consecutive races against modest opposition. She recorded her first victory with a three length win in the five furlong Little John Maiden Stakes at Nottingham Racecourse and followed up by easily defeating twenty-three opponents in the Quickly Plate at Windsor. She won the Palgrave Plate at Yarmouth Racecourse by seven lengths and was then moved up in distance for the July Fillies Stakes over six furlongs at Haydock Park Racecourse. She drew away from her rivals in the last quarter mile to win "in a hack canter" by an officially recorded margin of five lengths, although Timeform reported that she won by ten.

Melchbourne was then moved up in class for the Princess Margaret Stakes at Ascot Racecourse in late July. She led from the start, but tired in the closing stages and finished fourth behind Celestial Dawn, Highclere and Polygamy. She then returned to Haydock for the St Nicholas Plate over six furlongs in August and produced a "brilliant display", winning by ten lengths from Rouser, a colt who went on to win the Ormonde Stakes. In September the filly was brought back in distance to five furlongs and started 11/4 favourite (after heavy support in the betting market) for the Harry Rosebery Challenge Trophy at Ayr Racecourse. She raced just behind the leaders before moving into the lead two furlongs out but began to tire in the closing stages and had to be driven out to win by three quarters of a length from the colt Daring Boy.

=== 1974: three-year-old season ===
Melchbourne's three-year-old season was restricted to three races, all of them over sprint distances. On her seasonal debut at York Racecourse in May she had little luck in running and finished unplaced behind Noble Mark in the Duke of York Stakes. At Doncaster in June she was assigned top-weight of 133 pounds in a five furlong handicap race and won by half a length from Hei'land Jamie, a gelding who went on to win the Portland Handicap over the same course and distance. In July she contested the King George Stakes at Goodwood Racecourse and finished third, beaten a head and half a length by Singing Bede and Blessed Rock, after being badly hampered a quarter of a mile from the finish.

== Assessment ==
There was no International Classification of European two-year-olds in 1973: the official handicappers of Britain, Ireland and France compiled separate rankings for horses which competed in those countries. In the British Free Handicap, Melchbourne was allotted a weight of 120 pounds, making her the equal-best two-year-old filly of the season, alongside Bitty Girl and Gentle Thoughts. The independent Timeform organisation gave her a rating of 125 and named her as their best two-year-old filly, despite awarding a higher rating to the French-trained Hippodamia. In their annual Racehorses of 1973, Timeform described her as a "thoroughly likeable and most genuine filly". In the following year she was rated on 121 by Timeform, nine pounds inferior to their best sprinter Saritamer. In the official British handicap she was rated eleven pounds behind the top-rated three-year-old filly Dibidale.

== Breeding record ==
Melchbourne was retired from racing at the end of her three-year-old season and was scheduled to be covered by So Blessed. Melchbourne produced no reported foals and may have died soon after her retirement.

== Pedigree ==
Pedigree of Melchbourne (GB), bay mare, 1971
Sire Forlorn River (IRE) 1962	Fighting Don (USA); 1942	Fighting Fox	Sir Gallahad
Sire Forlorn River (IRE) 1962	Fighting Don (USA); 1942	Fighting Fox	Marguerite
Sire Forlorn River (IRE) 1962	Fighting Don (USA); 1942	Bird Nest	Mad Hatter
Sire Forlorn River (IRE) 1962	Fighting Don (USA); 1942	Bird Nest	Tree Top
Sire Forlorn River (IRE) 1962	Starflight (GB); 1950	Black Rock	Black Devil
Sire Forlorn River (IRE) 1962	Starflight (GB); 1950	Black Rock	Council Rock
Sire Forlorn River (IRE) 1962	Starflight (GB); 1950	Brave Array	Sir Walter Raleigh
Sire Forlorn River (IRE) 1962	Starflight (GB); 1950	Brave Array	Bold Front
Dam False Evidence (GB) 1963	Counsel (GB); 1952	Court Martial	Fair Trial
Dam False Evidence (GB) 1963	Counsel (GB); 1952	Court Martial	Instantaneous
Dam False Evidence (GB) 1963	Counsel (GB); 1952	Wheedler	Umidwar
Dam False Evidence (GB) 1963	Counsel (GB); 1952	Wheedler	Miss Minx
Dam False Evidence (GB) 1963	Idolatry (GB); 1948	Umidwar	Blandford
Dam False Evidence (GB) 1963	Idolatry (GB); 1948	Umidwar	Uganda
Dam False Evidence (GB) 1963	Idolatry (GB); 1948	Katmandu	Concerto
Dam False Evidence (GB) 1963	Idolatry (GB); 1948	Katmandu	Gold Leaf (Family:2-u)
