= Admetus (horse) =

French-bred Thoroughbred racehorse

- Sire: Reform
- Grandsire: Pall Mall
- Dam: La Milo
- Damsire: Hornbeam
- Sex: Gelding
- Foaled: 28 February 1970
- Country: France
- Colour: Chestnut
- Breeder: Ballymacoll Stud
- Owner: Michael Sobell
- Trainer: Dick Hern; John Cunnington, Jr; Fred Winter
- Record: 35: 12-5-4

Major wins
- William Hill Trophy (1973); Prix de la Porte de Madrid (1973); Grand Prix d'Evry (1974); Prince of Wales's Stakes (1974); Prix Maurice de Nieuil (1974); Washington D.C. International Stakes (1974)

Awards
- Timeform Top-rated older male (1974); Timeform rating 106 (1973), 133 (1974), 129 (1975)

Admetus (foaled 28 February 1970) was a French-bred Thoroughbred racehorse. Originally trained in England, he was gelded before his racing career began, rendering him ineligible to run in many of the top European races. Unraced as a two-year-old, he showed promise when winning his last three races in 1973 before being sent to race in France. In 1974 he emerged as a top-class middle-distance performer, winning the Grand Prix d'Evry, Prince of Wales's Stakes and the Prix Maurice de Nieuil before being sent to the United States and defeating a strong field in the Washington D.C. International Stakes. He remained in training for another four seasons but never recaptured the form he had shown in 1974. At the end of his four-year-old season he received the highest Timeform rating ever awarded to a gelding.

== Background ==
Admetus was a chestnut horse with a white sock on his left hind leg bred in France by the Ballymacoll Stud, the County Meath-based breeding operation of his owner Michael Sobell. He was sired by Reform an outstanding miler who won the St James's Palace Stakes, Sussex Stakes, Queen Elizabeth II Stakes and Champion Stakes in 1967. Admetus' dam La Milo won four races and went on to become a very successful broodmare, later producing The Derby winner Troy.

Admetus was sent into training with Dick Hern at West Ilsley in Berkshire.

== Racing career ==
=== 1973: three-year-old season ===
Admetus did not race as a two-year-old and was gelded before making his racecourse debut in 1973, making him ineligible for most European Group One races, which were restricted to entire colts and fillies. After being placed in his first three races, he recorded his first success in the Topcliffe Stakes, a maiden race over ten furlongs at Ripon Racecourse in August, winning "effortlessly" by nine lengths. On his next appearance he contested the valuable William Hill Trophy, a handicap race over one mile at Sandown Park Racecourse and won by three quarters of a length from Old Lucky, to whom he was conceding thirteen pounds. The runner-up went on to win the Royal Hunt Cup in 1974. He was then sent to France and won the Prix de la Porte de Madrid over 2000 metres at Longchamp Racecourse.

=== 1974: four-year-old season ===
In 1974, Admetus was transferred to the stable of John Cunnington in France and was ridden in most of his subsequent races by Maurice Philipperon. On his debut for his new trainer, Admetus finished third in the Prix Exbury at Saint-Cloud Racecourse on 21 March and then won a twenty-two runner handicap over 1950 metres at Longchamp. On 11 May the gelding recorded his first Group race win when he carried top weight to victory in Grand Prix d'Evry over 2400 metres, beating the favourite Luenge by two lengths with On My Way in third.

In the Prix Dollar at Longchamp on 2 June Admetus finished second, beaten three-quarters of a length by Margouillat. Later that month he was sent back to England to contest the Prince of Wales's Stakes (then a Group Two race open to horses of three years and above) over ten furlongs at Royal Ascot. Starting at odds of 6/1 he was restrained by Philipperon at the rear of the field before making rapid progress in the straight. He overtook the odds-on favourite Owen Dudley a furlong from the finish and won comfortably by three-quarters of a length. On 14 July the gelding started 1.7/1 favourite for the Prix Maurice de Nieuil over 2500 metres at Saint-Cloud. He was last of the thirteen runners entering the straight but then produced an impressive burst of acceleration to take the lead in the closing stages and win by three quarters of a lengths from the Preis von Europa winner Acacio d'Aguilar with Ashmore in third. Admetus started favourite for the Prix Gontaut-Biron over 2000 metres at Deauville Racecourse a month later, but failed to reproduce his best form and finished fourth behind the British-trained colt Ksar. Eleven days later he passed the post a neck in front of Ashmore in the Grand Prix de Deauville, but was relegated to second after the racecourse stewards found that Philipperon had struck the runner-up on the head with his whip in the closing stages.

On his final appearance in Europe in 1974, Admetus finished sixth behind the three-year-old Kamaraan in the Prix du Conseil de Paris over 2400 metres at Longchamp on 20 October. Admetus was then sent to the United States to join Dahlia and Margouillat in a three-strong French challenge for the Washington, D.C.International over one and a half miles at Laurel Park Racecourse. The other overseas challengers were Coup de Feu (Eclipse Stakes) from England, Mistigri (Irish St. Leger) from Ireland and Marduk (Deutsches Derby) from Germany. The three American runners were Big Spruce, Desert Vixen and the Manhattan Handicap winner Golden Don. On 9 November Dahlia, ridden by Lester Piggott, started the odds-on favourite for the International ahead of Big Spruce and Desert Vixen, with Admetus being made a 31/1 outsider. Desert Vixen was sent into the lead by Ron Turcotte, and set a slow pace before accelerating in the back straight, and reached the final turn with a clear advantage over Golden Don, Margouillat and Admetus. The French gelding, however, found a gap on the inside, produced a strong late run to overtake Desert Vixen inside the final furlong and won by three-quarters of a length, with Dahlia finishing well to take third place. After the race Philipperon said that the winner "showed good spirit and did everything right" whilst Dahlia's rider Lester Piggott said "Admetus is a great horse... we were beaten by real class".

=== 1975: five-year-old season ===
On his first appearance as a five-year-old, Admetus looked less than fully fit when sent to England for the John Porter Stakes at Newmbury in April and finished last of the thirteen runners behind Salado. He was off the racecourse for almost five months before returning to run four times in autumn. He won a race over 2200 metres at Longchamp before being sent to North America again and finishing fifth behind Snow Knight in the Canadian International Stakes.

=== 1976 – 1978: later career ===
Admetus ran eight times in 1976, winning three minor events, finishing second once and finishing third in the Prix Ridgway at Deauville. He was then sent back to England to be trained by Fred Winter and was campaigned over hurdles but failed to win in six attempts in 1977 and 1978.

== Assessment ==
There was no International Classification of European three-year-olds in 1973: the official handicappers of Britain, Ireland and France compiled separate rankings for horses which competed in those countries. In the British handicap for three-year-olds Admetus was assigned a weight of 107 pounds, thirty-three pounds behind the joint top-rated Dahlia and Thatch. The independent Timeform organisation gave him a rating of 106, thirty pounds behind their top-rated three-year-old Thatch. In their annual Racehorses of 1973 Timeform called him a potentially "smart performer" who seemed "certain to win more races". In the official French handicap for 1974, Admetus was ranked the fifth-best older horse behind Allez France, Margouillat, Tennyson and Dahlia. Timeform gave him a rating of 133, the highest ever awarded to a gelding in the organisation's history, placing him alongside Margouillat as their highest-rated older male horse of the year. In 1975 he was rated 129 by Timeform, eight pounds behind their Horse of the Year Grundy.

== Pedigree ==
Pedigree of Admetus (IRE), chestnut gelding, 1970
Sire Reform (GB) 1964	Pall Mall (IRE); 1955	Palestine	Fair Trial
Sire Reform (GB) 1964	Pall Mall (IRE); 1955	Palestine	Una
Sire Reform (GB) 1964	Pall Mall (IRE); 1955	Malapert	Portlaw
Sire Reform (GB) 1964	Pall Mall (IRE); 1955	Malapert	Malatesta
Sire Reform (GB) 1964	Country House (GB); 1955	Vieux Manoir	Brantôme
Sire Reform (GB) 1964	Country House (GB); 1955	Vieux Manoir	Vieille Maison
Sire Reform (GB) 1964	Country House (GB); 1955	Miss Coventry	Mieuxce
Sire Reform (GB) 1964	Country House (GB); 1955	Miss Coventry	Coventry Belle
Dam La Milo (GB) 1963	Hornbeam (GB); 1953	Hyperion	Gainsborough
Dam La Milo (GB) 1963	Hornbeam (GB); 1953	Hyperion	Selene
Dam La Milo (GB) 1963	Hornbeam (GB); 1953	Thicket	Nasrullah
Dam La Milo (GB) 1963	Hornbeam (GB); 1953	Thicket	Thorn Wood
Dam La Milo (GB) 1963	Pin Prick (GB); 1955	Pinza	Chanteur
Dam La Milo (GB) 1963	Pin Prick (GB); 1955	Pinza	Pasqua
Dam La Milo (GB) 1963	Pin Prick (GB); 1955	Miss Winston	Royal Charger
Dam La Milo (GB) 1963	Pin Prick (GB); 1955	Miss Winston	East Wantleye (Family: 1-b)
