= Polygamy (horse) =

British-bred Thoroughbred racehorse

- Racing silks of Louis Freedman
- Sire: Reform
- Grandsire: Pall Mall
- Dam: Seventh Bride
- Damsire: Royal Record
- Sex: Mare
- Foaled: 16 March 1971
- Country: United Kingdom
- Colour: Bay
- Breeder: Cliveden Stud
- Owner: Louis Freedman
- Trainer: Peter Walwyn
- Record: 10:5-1-2

Major wins
- 1000 Guineas Trial Stakes (1973); Oaks Stakes (1974)

Awards
- Timeform rating 117 (1973), 120 (1974)

Polygamy (16 March 1971 – 1977) was a British Thoroughbred racehorse, best known for winning the classic Epsom Oaks in 1974. As a two-year-old in 1973, she showed promise by winning three races and finishing fourth in the Critérium des Pouliches. In the following spring she won the 1000 Guineas Trial Stakes and was narrowly beaten in the 1000 Guineas before winning the Oaks. She was retired after being beaten in her only subsequent race and died without producing a foal.

== Background ==
Polygamy was a "light-framed" bay mare with no white markings bred in Berkshire by her owner, Louis Freedman's Cliveden Stud. She was unusually small for a Thoroughbred, reportedly standing only fifteen hands high as a three-year-old in 1974. She was sired by Reform an outstanding miler who won the St James's Palace Stakes, Sussex Stakes, Queen Elizabeth II Stakes and Champion Stakes in 1967. Polygamy was the first foal of her dam, Seventh Bride, a high-class racemare who won the Princess Royal Stakes and finished second in the Nassau Stakes in 1969. Seventh Bride went on to produce One Over Parr (also by Reform), a filly who won the Lancashire Oaks and was the female line ancestor of Camelot. The family traces back to the undefeated Kincsem.

Polygamy was sent into training with Peter Walwyn at his Seven Barrows stable at Lambourn and was ridden in most of her races by the Irish jockey Pat Eddery.

== Racing career ==
=== 1973: two-year-old season ===
After finishing fifth over five furlongs on her racecourse debut, Polygamy was moved up in distance for a six furlong maiden race at Newmarket Racecourse in June. She recorded her first victory, winning by three lengths from the Queen's filly Highclere. She was then stepped up for a strong renewal of the Princess Margaret Stakes at Ascot and finished third behind Celestial Dawn and Highclere, with Melchbourne in fourth. She faced less taxing opposition in the Rescue Service Stakes at Newmarket in August and won by six lengths from Tringa and twelve others. She was then moved up in distance for the Weatherby's Bi-Centennial Stakes over seven furlongs at the same course in September. She started favourite and won by four lengths from the colt Sky Lord, to whom she was conceding five pounds in weight.

On her final appearance of the season, Polygamy was sent to France to contest the Group One Critérium des Pouliches over 1600 metres at Longchamp Racecourse on 7 October. Ridden by Eddery she started at odds of 8/1, making her the best-fancied of the four British runners. She was drawn on the outside of the seventeen runner field and was towards the rear in the early stages before making significant progress in the straight and finishing fourth behind Hippodamia, Comtesse de Loir and La Tulipe.

=== 1974: three-year-old season ===
Polygamy began her second season in the Group Three 1000 Guineas Trial over seven furlong at Ascot in April. She started odds-on favourite and won by four lengths from Noble Mark, a filly who had won the Phoenix Stakes when trained in Ireland in 1973. On her next appearance, Polygamy started 4/1 favourite for the 161st running of the 1000 Guineas over the Rowley Mile at Newmarket against fourteen opponents including Celestial Dawn, Highclere, Bitty Girl and Gentle Thoughts. The filly appeared to struggle to match the early pace set by Bitty Girl and was under pressure from her jockey for most of the race but made progress into third place two furlongs out. At this point she was slightly hampered by the weakening Mrs Tiggywinkle, but recovered to dispute the finish with Highlere, losing by a short head. Timeform reported that she ran as if the distance was too short for her to show her best form.

Polygamy was moved up in distance to contest the 196th running of the Oaks Stakes over one and a half miles at Epsom Downs Racecourse. With Highclere re-routed to the Prix de Diane, Polygamy started the 3/1 favourite against fourteen opponents including Dibidale (a seven length winner of the Cheshire Oaks), Riboreen (Lingfield Oaks Trial), Mil's Bomb and Northern Gem (Fred Darling Stakes). As in the Guineas, Polygamy had to be pushed along by Eddery from the start as first Riboreen and then Furioso set the pace, and did not move into contention until the field entered the straight. She produced a sustained run on the outside to catch Furioso inside the final furlong and won by a length with Dibidale half a length away in third place. Dibidale was considered an unlucky loser as her saddle had slipped in the closing stages, forcing Willie Carson to ride bareback in the final furlong. The French-trained Matuta was promoted to third on the disqualification of Dibidale: the slipping of the saddle had dislodged the filly's weight cloth, meaning that Carson weighed in ten pounds too light. Polygamy faced Furioso, Dibidale and Matuta again, as well as the Irish 1000 Guineas winner Gaily in the Irish Oaks at the Curragh in July. As usual, she was under pressure soon after the start but after reaching second place in the straight she made no further progress and finished third, beaten five lengths and one and a half lengths by Dibidale and Gaily.

== Assessment ==
There was no International Classification of European two-year-olds in 1973: the official handicappers of Britain, Ireland and France compiled separate rankings for horses which competed in those countries. In the British Free Handicap, Polygamy was assigned a weight of 114 pounds, six pounds behind the join-top rated fillies Bitty Girl, Gentle Thoughts and Melchbourne. The independent Timeform organisation gave her a rating of 117, eight pounds behind their "best" two-year-old filly Melchbourne and thirteen pounds behind Hippodamia. In their annual Racehorses of 1973, Timeform described her as "smart... genuine and consistent" and "sure to win good-class races" but doubted that she was up to classic-winning standard.

In the British Free Handicap for three-year-olds for 1974, Polygamy was given a weight of 135 pounds, making her the third best filly behind Dibidale and Highclere. Timeform gave her a rating of 120, eleven pounds behind their top-rated three-year-old filly Comtesse de Loir.

In their book, A Century of Champions, based on the Timeform rating system, John Randall and Tony Morris rated Polygamy an "inferior" winner of the Oaks.

== Breeding record ==
Soon after her defeat in the Irish Oaks, it was announced that Polygamy was to be retired from racing to become a broodmare and covered by Petingo in 1975. She died without producing a living foal.

== Pedigree ==
Pedigree of Polygamy (GB), bay mare, 1971
Sire Reform (GB) 1964	Pall Mall (IRE); 1955	Palestine	Fair Trial
Sire Reform (GB) 1964	Pall Mall (IRE); 1955	Palestine	Una
Sire Reform (GB) 1964	Pall Mall (IRE); 1955	Malapert	Portlaw
Sire Reform (GB) 1964	Pall Mall (IRE); 1955	Malapert	Malatesta
Sire Reform (GB) 1964	Country House (GB); 1955	Vieux Manoir	Brantôme
Sire Reform (GB) 1964	Country House (GB); 1955	Vieux Manoir	Vieille Maison
Sire Reform (GB) 1964	Country House (GB); 1955	Miss Coventry	Mieuxce
Sire Reform (GB) 1964	Country House (GB); 1955	Miss Coventry	Coventry Belle
Dam Seventh Bride (GB) 1966	Royal Record (USA); 1958	Nasrullah	Nearco
Dam Seventh Bride (GB) 1966	Royal Record (USA); 1958	Nasrullah	Mumtaz Begum
Dam Seventh Bride (GB) 1966	Royal Record (USA); 1958	Miss Histoire	Blue Larkspur
Dam Seventh Bride (GB) 1966	Royal Record (USA); 1958	Miss Histoire	La Troienne
Dam Seventh Bride (GB) 1966	Little Miss Muffet (FR); 1959	Tourment	Tourbillon
Dam Seventh Bride (GB) 1966	Little Miss Muffet (FR); 1959	Tourment	Fragment
Dam Seventh Bride (GB) 1966	Little Miss Muffet (FR); 1959	My Mascot	Deiri
Dam Seventh Bride (GB) 1966	Little Miss Muffet (FR); 1959	My Mascot	Favorite (Family: 4-o)
