= Gaily (horse) =

American-bred Thoroughbred racehorse

- Sire: Sir Gaylord
- Grandsire: Turn-To
- Dam: Spearfish
- Damsire: Fleet Nasrullah
- Sex: Mare
- Foaled: 23 April 1971
- Country: Ireland
- Colour: Brown
- Breeder: Warner L. Jones
- Owner: Michael Sobell
- Trainer: Dick Hern
- Record: 9: 2-2-2

Major wins
- Irish 1000 Guineas (1974)

Awards
- Timeform rating 103 (1973), 121 (1974)

Gaily (23 April 1971 – after 1985) was an American-bred, British-trained Thoroughbred racehorse and broodmare. As a two-year-old in 1973 she failed to win but showed considerable promise in her two races. In the following year she won on her seasonal debut before recording her biggest success in the Irish 1000 Guineas. She went on to finish second in the Irish Oaks and third in the Prix Vermeille before being retired at the end of the season with a record of two wins and four places from nine starts. She went on to become a successful and influential broodmare whose descendants have included Pilsudski, Creachadoir and Landing Light.

== Background ==
Gaily was a "well-made, attractive" brown mare with no white markings bred in Kentucky by Warner L Jones of Hermitage Farm. As a yearling she was offered for sale at Keeneland and was bought for $120,000 by representatives of the British owner and breeder Michael Sobell. The filly was sent to race in Europe and entered training with Dick Hern at West Ilsley in Berkshire, where she was a contemporary of the Queen's filly Highclere.

She was sired by Sir Gaylord, a half brother to Secretariat and a successful racehorse and sire in his own right: his other offspring included Sir Ivor and Habitat. Her dam Spearfish was a high-class racemare who won the Hollywood Oaks and the Santa Susana Stakes in 1966. She later became a very successful broodmare who also produced King's Bishop and Empire Glory.

== Racing career ==
=== 1973: two-year-old season ===
Gaily made her racecourse debut in a maiden race over six furlongs at Newbury Racecourse in August, and finished second of the sixteen runners, beaten one and a half lengths by the Peter Walwyn-trained Heavenly Form. She was moved up in distance for the Green Shield Stakes over one mile at Ascot Racecourse a month later and finished third to Escorial and Evening Venture after having some problems in obtaining a clear run.

=== 1974: three-year-old season ===
Gaily recorded her first victory on her three-year-old debut, winning a nineteen-runner maiden over one mile at Ascot in April: it proved to be her last race in England. She was sent to Ireland and moved up in class for the Irish 1000 Guineas on soft ground at the Curragh on 18 May. Ridden by the Australian jockey Ron Hutchinson she started the 11/5 favourite ahead of her fellow British challenger Always Faithful who was partnered by Lester Piggott. The best fancied of the other 15 runners included Silk Buds (winner of the Park Stakes and Silken Glider Stakes), Matuno God (Mulcahy Stakes), Northern Gem (Fred Darling Stakes), Lady Rowe and Perfect Aim. Gaily took the lead at half way, went clear of the field and won easily by one and a half lengths from Northern Gem.

Gaily failed to win her in her five remaining races but ran well in some top-class races. In the Prix de Diane over 2000 metres at Chantilly Racecourse on 14 June she started a 25/1 outsider and finished seventh of the 22 runners behind her stablemate Highclere, who won from Comtesse de Loir. She then returned to the Curragh for the Irish Oaks over one and a half miles on 20 July and finished second to Dibidale with Polygamy in third. In the Prix de la Nonette at Longchamp Racecourse on 1 September she came home sixth behind Paulista when conceding weight to her eleven opponents. Three weeks later at the same track she started a 35/1 outsider in the Prix Vermeille but belied her odds as she finished third of the fifteen runners behind Paulista and Comtesse de Loir. On her final appearance she was unplaced behind Cheryl in the Prix de l'Opéra at Longchamp on 6 October.

== Assessment ==
In 1973he independent Timeform organisation gave the Gaily a rating of 103, 22 pounds behind their best two-year-old filly Melchbourne. In their annual Racehorses of 1973 they described her as "sure to win a race" and likely to stay ten furlongs. In the following year Timeform described her as "tough, genuine and consistent" and gave her a rating of 121, ten pounds behind their top three-year-old filly Comtesse de Loir.

== Breeding record ==
Gaily was retired from racing to become a broodmare for her owner's Ballymacoll Stud. She produced at least nine foals between 1976 and 1986:

- Clean Slate, a bay colt, foaled in 1976, sired by Reform
- Gay Milly, bay filly, 1977, by Mill Reef. Won one race, female-line ancestor of Pilsudski, Creachadoir and Fine Motion (Shuka Sho).
- Hard To Say, bay colt, 1978, by Lyphard
- Glad Tidings, brown filly, 1979, by Pharly. Won two races.
- Laughing Boy, bay colt, 1980, by Riverman
- Gay Hellene, bay filly, 1982, by Ela-Mana-Mou. Won three races including Prix de Flore dam of Landing Light.
- Gay Fantastic, bay filly, 1983, by Ela-Mana-Mou. Dam of Cape Tribulation (Cotswold Chase) and Moon Solitaire (King Edward Stakes).
- Grecian Girl, brown filly, 1985, by Ela-Mana-Mou
- Glad Man, bay colt, 1986, by Ela-Mana-Mou

== Pedigree ==
Pedigree of Gaily (USA), bay mare 1971
Sire Sir Gaylord (USA) 1959	Turn-To (IRE); 1951	Royal Charger	Nearco
Sire Sir Gaylord (USA) 1959	Turn-To (IRE); 1951	Royal Charger	Sun Princess
Sire Sir Gaylord (USA) 1959	Turn-To (IRE); 1951	Source Sucree	Admiral Drake
Sire Sir Gaylord (USA) 1959	Turn-To (IRE); 1951	Source Sucree	Lavendula
Sire Sir Gaylord (USA) 1959	Somethingroyal (USA); 1952	Princequillo	Prince Rose
Sire Sir Gaylord (USA) 1959	Somethingroyal (USA); 1952	Princequillo	Cosquilla
Sire Sir Gaylord (USA) 1959	Somethingroyal (USA); 1952	Imperatrice	Caruso
Sire Sir Gaylord (USA) 1959	Somethingroyal (USA); 1952	Imperatrice	Cinquepace
Dam Spearfish (USA) 1963	Fleet Nasrullah (USA); 1955	Nasrullah	Nearco
Dam Spearfish (USA) 1963	Fleet Nasrullah (USA); 1955	Nasrullah	Mumtaz Begum
Dam Spearfish (USA) 1963	Fleet Nasrullah (USA); 1955	Happy Go Fleet	Count Fleet
Dam Spearfish (USA) 1963	Fleet Nasrullah (USA); 1955	Happy Go Fleet	Draeh
Dam Spearfish (USA) 1963	Alabama Gal (USA); 1957	Determine	Alibhai
Dam Spearfish (USA) 1963	Alabama Gal (USA); 1957	Determine	Koubis
Dam Spearfish (USA) 1963	Alabama Gal (USA); 1957	Trojan Lass	Priam
Dam Spearfish (USA) 1963	Alabama Gal (USA); 1957	Trojan Lass	Rompers (Family: 11)
