= Bitty Girl =

British Thoroughbred racehorse

- Sire: Habitat
- Grandsire: Sir Gaylord
- Dam: Garvey Girl
- Damsire: Princely Gift
- Sex: Mare
- Foaled: 1971
- Country: United Kingdom
- Colour: Bay
- Breeder: Mrs. W. F. Davison
- Owner: David Robinson
- Trainer: Michael Jarvis
- Record: 20:8-2-0

Major wins
- Queen Mary Stakes (1973); Molecomb Stakes (1973); Lowther Stakes (1973)

Awards
- Timeform rating 121 (1973), 119 (1974); Top-rated British Two-year-old filly (1973)

Bitty Girl (1971–1994) was a British Thoroughbred racehorse and broodmare. She was one of the leading fillies of her generation in 1973 when she won her first five races including the Queen Mary Stakes, Molecomb Stakes and Lowther Stakes. In the following year she failed to win but ran prominently in some major sprint races before being sold at the end of the aeon and sent to race in the United Stakes where she won three minor races. After her retirement from racing she had some success as a broodmare, producing the Prix Maurice de Gheest winner Beaudelaire. [sic]

== Background ==
Bitty Girl was a "neat, strong, well-made" bay mare with no white markings bred in England by Mrs. W. F. Davison. She was from the first crop of foals sired by Habitat, an American-bred, British-raced miler who became one of the leading European stallions of the 1970s and 1980s. His other progeny included Habibti, Flying Water, Marwell, Rose Bowl and Steinlen and he was the British Champion broodmare sire on three occasions. Bitty Girl's dam, Garvey Girl, was moderate racehorse but a successful broodmare who also produced the Flying Childers and Palace House Stakes winner Hot Spark. Garvey Girl's grand-dam, Chart Room, was a half-sister of the 2000 Guineas winner Pay Up.

As a yearling, the filly was sent to the sales and bought for 8,400 guineas by representatives of the businessman and philanthropist David Robinson. Bitty Girl was sent to Robinson's Carlburg Stable in Newmarket where she was trained by Michael Jarvis.

== Racing career ==
=== 1973: two-year-old season ===
Bitty Girl made her racecourse debut when she started 5/4 favourite for the Juvenile Fillies' Plate over five furlongs at Kempton Park Racecourse in April. She created a very favourable impression, leading from the start and winning by seven lengths from Streak of Honour. In the following month she started 2/5 favourite for the George Lambton Stakes at Newmarket Racecourse and won by two lengths from Pass A Glance.

In June Bitty Girl was moved up in class for the Queen Mary Stakes on soft ground at Royal Ascot. Ridden by Bruce Raymond, she started second favourite behind Eveneca at odds of 11/2. She took an early lead but was soon overtaken by Eveneca before regaining the lead in the final furlong. She held off the late challenge of Chili Girl to win by a neck, with Mrs Tiggywinkle taking third place. Her win gave Jarvis a double, having earlier won the Jersey Stakes with Pitskelly. Bitty Girl conceded five pounds to Eveneca and two pounds to Chili Girl when the trio met again on firmer ground in the Molecomb Stakes at Goodwood and started at odds of 7/4. She raced in second behind Eveneca for most of the way before taking the lead in the final furlong and winning by three quarters of a length with Street Light and Lady Tan in third and fourth. The filly's next race was the Lowther Stakes, then run over five furlongs, at York Racecourse in August. As well as Eveneca and Chili Girl, she was also opposed by the Irish filly Noble Mark, the winner of the Phoenix Stakes. Starting at 9/4, and ridden as usual by Raymond, she took the lead at half way and held on to win by three quarters of a length from the fast-finishing Noble Mark.

On her final appearance of the season, Bitty Girl was moved up in distance for the Group One Cheveley Park Stakes over six furlongs at Newmarket. She looked well in the paddock before the race but never looked likely to win at any stage and finished eleventh of the fourteen runners behind Gentle Thoughts, Red Berry and Lady Tan.

=== 1974: three-year-old season ===
Bitty Girl failed to win in six starts as a three-year-old, but produced some good performances in defeat. She made her reappearance in the 1000 Guineas over the Rowley Mile course at Nemarket. Racing over a distance of a mile she started favourite and set a strong pace from the start but tired badly in the second half of the race and finished unplaced behind Highclere, Polygamy and Mrs Tiggywinkle. She returned to sprint distances for the Temple Stakes over five furlongs at Sandown Park Racecourse in May and finished fifth behind the three-year-old colt Bay Express. She produced her best performance of the season at Royal Ascot in June, when she finished second, half a length behind Bay Express in the King's Stand Stakes. Bitty Girl started favourite for the King George Stakes at Goodwood, but was badly hampered half way through the race and finished unplaced behind Singing Bede, Blessed Rock and Melchbourne. In August she produced a better performance in the Nunthorpe Stakes at York, finishing fourth behind Blue Cashmere, Rapid River and Saritamer. Bitty Girl was dropped in class for the Marlborough Stakes at Newbury Racecourse in September, but failed to reproduce her best form and finished fourth behind Street Light.

At Newmarket in December, Bitty Girl was sold at auction for 43,000 guineas and sent to race in the United States.

=== 1975: four-year-old season ===
Bitty Girl was campaigned in North America in 1975 and won three of her eight races at distances of up to a mile as well a finishing second on one occasion.

== Assessment ==
There was no International Classification of European two-year-olds in 1973: the official handicappers of Britain, Ireland and France compiled separate rankings for horses which competed in those countries. In the British Free Handicap, Bitty Girl was allotted a weight of 120 pounds, making her the equal-best two-year-old filly of the season, alongside Melchbourne and Gentle Thoughts. The independent Timeform organisation gave the filly a rating of 121, two pounds behind Melchbourne and three ahead of Gentle Thoughts. In the following year she was rated on 119 by Timeform, eleven pounds inferior to their best sprinter Saritamer.

== Breeding record ==
Bitty Girl as retired from racing to become a broodmare in the United States, where she produced thirteen foals and five winners.

- Nijit, a bay filly, foaled in 1977, sired by Nijinsky. Won five races, third in the Cotillion Handicap.
- Memento, bay colt, 1979, by Roberto. Won Ballycorus Stakes
- Beaudelaire, chestnut colt, 1980, by Nijinsky. Won four races including the Prix Maurice de Gheest and Beeswing Stakes
- Walladah, bay filly, 1981, by Northern Dancer. Failed to win in eight races.
- Yukon Baby, bay filly, 1982, by Northern Dancer, unraced
- Suffragette, bay filly, 1983, by Northjet
- Size Six, dark bay or brown filly, 1985, by Caerleon, unraced
- Souada, chestnut filly, 1986, by General Holme, unraced
- Glorietta, bay filly, 1987, by Shadeed, unraced
- Sue Warner, dark bay or brown filly, 1988, by Forli, unraced. Ancestor of Drefong, Action This Day, Star Catcher and Pisco Sour (Prix Eugène Adam)
- Honor Boy, dark bay or brown colt, 1989, by Seattle Slew. Won one race.
- Itaquere Keeneland, chestnut filly, 1993, by Opening Verse

== Pedigree ==
Pedigree of Bitty Girl (GB), bay mare, 1971
Sire Habitat (USA) 1966	Sir Gaylord (USA); 1959	Turn-To	Royal Charger
Sire Habitat (USA) 1966	Sir Gaylord (USA); 1959	Turn-To	Source Sucree
Sire Habitat (USA) 1966	Sir Gaylord (USA); 1959	Somethingroyal	Princequillo
Sire Habitat (USA) 1966	Sir Gaylord (USA); 1959	Somethingroyal	Imperatrice
Sire Habitat (USA) 1966	Little Hut (USA); 1952	Occupy	Bull Dog
Sire Habitat (USA) 1966	Little Hut (USA); 1952	Occupy	Miss Bunting
Sire Habitat (USA) 1966	Little Hut (USA); 1952	Savage Beauty	Challenger
Sire Habitat (USA) 1966	Little Hut (USA); 1952	Savage Beauty	Khara
Dam Garvey Girl (IRE) 1960	Princely Gift (GB); 1951	Nasrullah	Nearco
Dam Garvey Girl (IRE) 1960	Princely Gift (GB); 1951	Nasrullah	Mumtaz Begum
Dam Garvey Girl (IRE) 1960	Princely Gift (GB); 1951	Blue Gem	Blue Peter
Dam Garvey Girl (IRE) 1960	Princely Gift (GB); 1951	Blue Gem	Bois Roussel
Dam Garvey Girl (IRE) 1960	Tekka (GB); 1953	Ridge Wood	Hanging Fall
Dam Garvey Girl (IRE) 1960	Tekka (GB); 1953	Ridge Wood	Sans Tares
Dam Garvey Girl (IRE) 1960	Tekka (GB); 1953	Chart Room	Blue Peter
Dam Garvey Girl (IRE) 1960	Tekka (GB); 1953	Chart Room	Book Debt (Family:1-n)

- Through her dam Garvey Girl, Bitty Girl was inbred 4 x 4 to Blue Peter, meaning that this stallion appears twice in the fourth generation of her pedigree.
