= Bay Express (horse) =

Irish-bred Thoroughbred racehorse

- Sire: Polyfoto
- Grandsire: Polic
- Dam: Pal Sinna
- Damsire: Palestine
- Sex: Stallion
- Foaled: 14 April 1971
- Country: Ireland
- Colour: Bay
- Breeder: J. M. O'Connor
- Owner: P Miller
- Trainer: Peter Nelson
- Record: 14:6-2-1

Major wins
- Field Marshall Stakes (1974); Temple Stakes (1974); King's Stand Stakes (1974); Sceptre Stakes (1975); Nunthorpe Stakes (1975)

Awards
- Timeform rating 111 (1973), 126 (1974), 132 (1974)

Bay Express (14 April 1971 – December 1990) was an Irish-bred British-trained Thoroughbred racehorse and sire. A specialist sprinter, he showed some promise when winning one minor race as a two-year-old in 1973. In the following year he won all three of his races including the Temple Stakes and the King's Stand Stakes before his season was ended by injury. As a four-year-old in 1975 he established himself as the best British-trained sprinter of the year with an emphatic win in the Nunthorpe Stakes. He later had some success as a breeding stallion.

== Background ==
Bay Express was an "attractive, well-made" bay horse with a white sock on his right hind foot bred in Ireland by J M O'Connor. His sire Polyfoto was a sprinter whose wins included the Nunthorpe Stakes, Temple Stakes and King George Stakes in Britain and a division of the Palm Beach Handicap after being sent to race in the United States. Bay Express was the first foal of his dam Pal Sinna, a poor racehorse who failed to win a race. She was, however, a descendant of the broodmare Lady of Aran, making her a distant relative of many major winners including Teenoso, Sir Percy and Rule of Law.

As a yearling, the colt was offered for sale and bought for 6,800 guineas by P Miller. He was sent into training with Peter Nelson at Kingsdown Stables in Lambourn.

== Racing career ==
=== 1973: two-year-old season ===
After finishing unplaced over five furlongs on his racecourse debut, Bay Express was moved up in distance for the Foxhall Maiden Stakes over six furlongs at Goodwood Racecourse in late July. He led from the start, tracking across from an inside draw to race on the far rail and winning by three lengths from Straight Flight. Three weeks later the colt started favourite for the Prince of Wales's Stakes at York Racecourse. As at Goodwood, he led from the start and looked likely to win easily when he faltered on a patch of soft ground a furlong out and was beaten a neck by St Louisan. On his final appearance of the season, the colt was moved up in class for the Mill Reef Stakes at Newbury Racecourse. He appeared to be travelling well until the closing stages, but then faded badly and finished fourth of the six runners behind Habat.

=== 1974: three-year-old season ===
As a three-year-old Bay Express was undefeated in three races in a season attenuated by injury. He made his first appearance of the year in the Field Marshal Stakes over five furlongs at Haydock Park in April and won by two lengths from the gelding Blue Star. In May he was moved up in class for the Temple Stakes at Sandown Park Racecourse in which he was ridden by Brian Taylor. Starting at odds of 11/2, he led for most of the way and accelerated in the closing stages to win by one and a half lengths from the Portland Handicap winner Supreme Gift, with Noble Mark (Phoenix Stakes) in third and Bitty Girl in fifth. In June, Bay Express started 9/4 favourite for the King's Stand Stakes at Royal Ascot. Taylor sent him into the lead soon after the start and the colt held off several challengers to win by half a length from Bitty Girl with Noble Mark, Rapid River (Gimcrack Stakes) and Brave Lad (Palace House Stakes) next to finish. It was intended that Bay Express would be moved up in distance to contest the July Cup but he missed the race after he sustained an injury in his stall. He then developed a large splint which kept him off the course for the rest of the year.

=== 1975: four-year-old season ===
Bay Express began his third season with a run in the Sceptre Stakes at Kempton Park Racecourse in March. He appeared unsuited by the prevailing soft ground but won by a short head from Silver God. The colt then ran in the Palace House Stakes at Newmarket and looked the likely winner before he was caught in the final strides and was beaten a neck by the Irish-trained three-year-old Hot Spark. New tactics were employed when Bay Express ran in the Temple Stakes. He was restrained in the early stages and was never in contention, finishing fifth behind Blue Cashmere.

In June he was equipped with Blinkers as he attempted to repeat his 1974 victory in the King's Stand Stakes. He set off in front at a very fast pace, but faded in the last quarter mile and finished seventh behind the French-trained four-year-old Flirting Around. In the King George Stakes at Goodwood, he appeared to be an unlucky loser. He led for most of the way and looked likely to win before stumbling fifty yards from the finish and finished third, half a length and a short head by Auction Ring and Hot Spark. At York in August, Bay Express started at odds of 100/30 for the Nunthorpe Stakes in which his opponents included Hot Spark, Auction Ring and Roman Warrior, and in which he was ridden for the first time by the Scottish jockey Willie Carson. Carson sent him into the lead from the start and he was never looked in any danger of defeat, winning by a length and a half from the Irish filly Willy Willy, with Polly Peachum third and Roman Warrior fourth. On his final appearance, Bay Express was sent to France for the Prix de l'Abbaye over 1000 metres at Longchamp Racecourse on 5 October. Racing on soft ground, he failed to reproduce his form and finished unplaced behind Lianga.

== Assessment ==
There was no International Classification of European two-year-olds in 1973: the official handicappers of Britain, Ireland and France compiled separate rankings for horses which competed in those countries. In the British Free Handicap, Bay Express was given a rating of 111 pounds, twenty-two pounds behind the top-rated Apalachee, the winner of the William Hill Futurity. The independent Timeform organisation also rated the colt on 111, twenty-six pounds inferior to Apalachee. In the following year he was rated 126 by Timeform, four pounds behind their best sprinter Saritamer although they admitted that his brief season made him difficult to assess. In the British Free Handicap for three-year-olds he was rated the seventh-best colt of his generation behind Take A Reef, Bustino, Nonoalco, Snow Knight, Giacometti and Saritamer. Bay Express achieved his peak Timeform rating of 132 in 1975, two pounds behind their best sprinter Flirting Around and five behind their Horse of the Year Grundy. In the official British handicap for 1975 he was rated the fourth-best older horse behind Bustino, Flirting Around and Star Appeal. In both sets of ratings he was the highest-rated British-trained sprinter.

== Stud record ==
Bay Express began his career as a breeding stallion at the Someries Stud at Newmarket in 1976. The most successful of his offspring included All Systems Go (Seaton Delaval Stakes), Poets Cove (Molecomb Stakes) and Shoot Clear (Waterford Candelabra Stakes).

== Pedigree ==
Pedigree of Bay Express (IRE), bay stallion, 1971
Sire Polyfoto (GB) 1962	Polic (FR); 1953	Relic	War Relic
Sire Polyfoto (GB) 1962	Polic (FR); 1953	Relic	Bridal Colors
Sire Polyfoto (GB) 1962	Polic (FR); 1953	Polaire	Le Volcan
Sire Polyfoto (GB) 1962	Polic (FR); 1953	Polaire	Stella Polaris
Sire Polyfoto (GB) 1962	Brabantia (GB); 1953	Honeyway	Fairway
Sire Polyfoto (GB) 1962	Brabantia (GB); 1953	Honeyway	Honey Buzzard
Sire Polyfoto (GB) 1962	Brabantia (GB); 1953	Porthaven	Portlaw
Sire Polyfoto (GB) 1962	Brabantia (GB); 1953	Porthaven	Peaceful Light
Dam Pal Sinna (IRE) 1966	Palestine (GB); 1947	Fair Trial	Fairway
Dam Pal Sinna (IRE) 1966	Palestine (GB); 1947	Fair Trial	Lady Juror
Dam Pal Sinna (IRE) 1966	Palestine (GB); 1947	Una	Tetratema
Dam Pal Sinna (IRE) 1966	Palestine (GB); 1947	Una	Uganda
Dam Pal Sinna (IRE) 1966	Sinna (GB); 1956	Birikan	Bahram
Dam Pal Sinna (IRE) 1966	Sinna (GB); 1956	Birikan	Carola
Dam Pal Sinna (IRE) 1966	Sinna (GB); 1956	Inisheer	Devonian
Dam Pal Sinna (IRE) 1966	Sinna (GB); 1956	Inisheer	Lady of Aran (Family:3-c)

- Bay Express was inbred 4 x 4 to Fairway, meaning that this stallion appears twice in the fourth generation of his pedigree.
