= Dibidale =

Irish-bred Thoroughbred racehorse

- Sire: Aggressor
- Grandsire: Combat
- Dam: Priddy Maid
- Damsire: Acropolis
- Sex: Mare
- Foaled: 6 April 1971
- Country: Ireland
- Colour: Chestnut
- Breeder: Swettenham Stud
- Owner: Nick Robinson; Robert Sangster
- Trainer: Barry Hills
- Record: 12: 3-2-2

Major wins
- Cheshire Oaks (1974); Irish Oaks (1974); Yorkshire Oaks (1974)

Awards
- Top-rated British three-year-old filly (1974); Timeform rating 90 (1973), 129 (1974), 122 (1975)

Dibidale (6 April 1971 – 20 August 1975) was an Irish-bred, British-trained Thoroughbred racehorse. After one minor win in two races as a two-year-old, she emerged as arguably the best filly of her generation in the following year. She won the Cheshire Oaks by seven lengths and appeared a most unlucky loser when her saddle slipped in the closing stages of The Oaks. She then won the Irish Oaks by five lengths, beating the first three in the Epsom race and added a win in the Yorkshire Oaks before her season was ended by injury. She failed to win as a four-year-old and sustained a fatal injury in the Geoffrey Freer Stakes in August.

== Background ==
Dibidale was a "strong, shapely, attractive" chestnut filly with a narrow white blaze bred in Ireland by Robert Sangster's Swettenham stud. She was probably the best horse sired by Aggressor who won the King George VI and Queen Elizabeth Stakes in 1960. Dibidale's dam Priddy Maid, who stood only fifteen hands high, won four races and finished second in the Galtres Stakes. Her other foals included Shellshock, who finished third to Waterloo and Jacinth in the 1000 Guineas and Cracaval who won the Chester Vase and defeated Ile de Bourbon in the September Stakes. Priddy Maid was a half-sister of Severn Bridge the dam of the Prix de l'Arc de Triomphe winner Tony Bin and, as a descendant of the broodmare Calluna, was related to many other major winners including Viva Pataca, Bolkonski, Vitiges and Athens Wood.

As a foal, Dibidale was sent to the Newmarket December sales and bought for 3,200 guineas by N J F Robinson. She was sent into training with Barry Hills at Lambourn in Berkshire.

== Racing career ==
=== 1973: two-year-old season ===
After finishing sixth over six furlongs on her racecourse debut, Dibidale started favourite for the Sandwich Maiden Stakes over seven furlongs at Ascot Racecourse in October. She made progress in the closing stages to take third place, three lengths behind the winner Kew Gardens.

=== 1974: three-year-old season ===
On her three-year-old debut Dibidale started favourite for the Steve Donoghue Stakes over a mile at Haydock Park Racecourse in April. Racing on very firm ground she took the lead in the straight but then hung to the left in the closing stages and was beaten a head into second place by the colt Scientist. In May, the filly was moved up in distance for the Cheshire Oaks (a trial race for The Oaks) over one and a half miles at Chester Racecourse. She established herself as a leading classic contender by winning by seven lengths from the Noel Murless-trained Mil's Bomb with Venshoon in third.

In the 196th running of the Epsom Oaks, Dibidale, ridden by Willie Carson started at odds of 6/1 behind the 3/1 favourite Polygamy, the runner-up in the 1000 Guineas. Carson moved the filly into contention a quarter mile from the finish at which point her girth strap became loose, causing her the saddle to slip around under her belly. Apart from interfering with the filly's ability to gallop freely, the tack malfunction meant that Carson had to ride the closing stages bareback. Despite her disadvantages, Dibidale finished third, beaten a length and half a length by Polygamy and Furioso, and just ahead of the French-trained Matuta, but was disqualified from third place for carrying an incorrect weight. Thoroughbred racehorses carry a cloth under the saddle into which metal weights are inserted to ensure that they carry the correct weight: this "weight-cloth" (containing ten pounds of lead) had become dislodged when Dibidale's saddle slipped. In July, Dibidale faced Polygamy, Furioso and Matuta again, as well as the Irish 1,000 Guineas winner Gaily in the Irish Oaks over one and a half miles at the Curragh Racecourse. She raced in third place until the straight but then accelerated clear of her rivals to win by five lengths from Gaily, with Polygamy a length and a half away in third. Timeform described her performance as "the most impressive classic win of the season".

At York Racecourse in August, only two fillies, Mil's Bomb and Sea Singer, appeared to challenge Dibidale in the Yorkshire Oaks, and she was made the 1/3 favourite. Neither of her opponents showed any inclination to make the pace, and Dibidale was forced to lead from the start. In the straight, Mil's Bomb accelerated past the favourite to establish a narrow advantage and looked the likely winner, but Dibidale rallied in the final strides to regain the lead and won by a head. Dibidale was then scheduled to travel to Longchamp Racecourse, where she would be matched against the leading French fillies Paulista and Comtesse de Loir in the Prix Vermeille on 22 September. Twelve days before the race however, she sustained an injury to her left foreleg during an exercise gallop and did not race again in 1974.

=== 1975: four-year-old season ===
Dibidale was bought back by her breeder Robert Sangster in early 1975 and remained in training but failed to win in five starts. On her first run of the season she contested the Jockey Club Stakes at Newmarket in May and finished third behind the Bruce Hobbs-trained filly Shebeen. At Royal Ascot in June she finished third to Charlie Bubbles and Arthurian in what Timeform described as the weakest running of the Hardwicke Stakes for many years. Dibidale finished unplaced in her next two races, the Grand Prix de Saint-Cloud and the King George VI and Queen Elizabeth Stakes, before being moved up in distance for the Geoffrey Freer Stakes over thirteen and a half furlongs at Newbury Racecourse in August. She again finished unplaced and was found to have split the pastern of her right foreleg. The injury did not respond to treatment and she was euthanized later that month.

== Assessment ==
There was no International Classification of European two-year-olds in 1973: the official handicappers of Britain, Ireland and France compiled separate rankings for horses which competed in those countries. Dibidale was not given a rating in the British Free Handicap, but was given a rating of 90 by the independent Timeform organisation, making her forty pounds inferior to their top-rated juvenile filly Hippodamia. In their notes on the filly in their annual Racehorses of 1973 Timeform stated "will be suited by 1¼+: sure to win a race". In the official British handicap for 1974, Dibidale was rated the best three-year-old filly of the season, one pound ahead of the 1000 Guineas winner Highclere and two pounds superior to Polygamy. Timeform gave her a rating of 129, two pounds behind their highest-rated three-year-old filly Comtesse de Loir. In her final year she was rated 122 by Timeform.

In their book, A Century of Champions, based on the Timeform rating system, John Randall and Tony Morris rated Dibidale the 37th best female racehorse trained in Britain and Ireland in the 20th century.

Barry Hills described Dibidale as "the unluckiest loser of a Classic I have seen" and best horse he had ever trained.

== Pedigree ==
Pedigree of Dibidale (IRE), chestnut filly, 1971
Sire Aggressor (GB) 1955	Combat (GB); 1944	Big Game	Ardan
Sire Aggressor (GB) 1955	Combat (GB); 1944	Big Game	Saucy Bella
Sire Aggressor (GB) 1955	Combat (GB); 1944	Commotion	Blue Peter
Sire Aggressor (GB) 1955	Combat (GB); 1944	Commotion	Lighthearted
Sire Aggressor (GB) 1955	Phaetonia (IRE); 1945	Nearco	Pharos
Sire Aggressor (GB) 1955	Phaetonia (IRE); 1945	Nearco	Nogara
Sire Aggressor (GB) 1955	Phaetonia (IRE); 1945	Phaetusa	Hyperion
Sire Aggressor (GB) 1955	Phaetonia (IRE); 1945	Phaetusa	Saddle Tor
Dam Priddy Maid (GB) 1961	Acropolis (GB); 1952	Donatello	Blenheim
Dam Priddy Maid (GB) 1961	Acropolis (GB); 1952	Donatello	Delleana
Dam Priddy Maid (GB) 1961	Acropolis (GB); 1952	Aurora	Hyperion
Dam Priddy Maid (GB) 1961	Acropolis (GB); 1952	Aurora	Rose Red
Dam Priddy Maid (GB) 1961	Priddy Fair (GB); 1956	Preciptic	Precipitation
Dam Priddy Maid (GB) 1961	Priddy Fair (GB); 1956	Preciptic	Artistic
Dam Priddy Maid (GB) 1961	Priddy Fair (GB); 1956	Campanette	Fair Trial
Dam Priddy Maid (GB) 1961	Priddy Fair (GB); 1956	Campanette	Calluna (Family:19-b)
