= Cry of Truth =

British-bred Thoroughbred racehorse

- Sire: Town Crier
- Grandsire: Sovereign Path
- Dam: False Evidence
- Damsire: Counsel
- Sex: Mare
- Foaled: 1972
- Country: United Kingdom
- Colour: Grey
- Breeder: Pearl Lawson Johnston/ Langham Hall Stud
- Owner: Pearl Lawson Johnston
- Trainer: Bruce Hobbs
- Record: 7:5-1-0

Major wins
- Lowther Stakes (1974); Cheveley Park Stakes (1974)

Awards
- Timeform rating 129 (1974); Timeform Best two-year-old filly Top-rated British two-year-old filly(1974)

Cry of Truth (foaled 1972) was a British Thoroughbred racehorse and broodmare. In a racing career which lasted from May 1974 until April 1975 she won five of her seven races. After finishing second on her racecourse debut she won her next five races including the Lowther Stakes and the Cheveley Park Stakes (against a very strong field) and was rated the best two-year-old filly of her generation in Britain by a wide margin. She failed to reproduce her best form on her only start in 1975 and was retired to stud, where she had some success as a broodmare.

== Background ==
Cry of Truth was a "most attractive, shapely" grey mare (a very dark grey during her racing career) bred in Suffolk by her owners Pearl Lawson Johnston's Langham Hall Stud. She was from the second crop of foals sired by Town Crier, a grey horse who recorded his biggest win in the Queen Anne Stakes. Cry of Truth's dam, False Evidence, was of no use as a racehorse, failing to win in fifteen starts on the flat and four over hurdles but was a successful broodmare, having previously produced the winning sprinter Melchbourne (horse). Miss Lawson Johnston, a Master of Foxhounds and Justice of the peace, sent her filly into training with Bruce Hobbs at the Palace House stable in Newmarket, Suffolk.

== Racing career ==
=== 1974: two-year-old season ===
On her racecourse debut, Cry of Truth ran in a qualifier for the Wills Embassy Stakes over five furlongs at York Racecourse in May. She started poorly and showed signs of inexperience but finished strongly and finished second, beaten half a length by the more experienced colt Hunting Prince. On her next appearance, the filly recorded her first success as she won by four lengths from modest opposition in a maiden race over five furlongs at Doncaster Racecourse. In the final of the Wills Embassy Stakes at Goodwood Racecourse in August Cry of Truth face a rematch against Hunting Prince, the colt who had beaten her at York. She led for most of the way and accelerate clear in the closing stages to beat Hunting Prince by five lengths. Shortly afterwards, the filly was moved up in class to contest the Group Two Lowther Stakes over five furlongs at York. Ridden by John Gorton, she started the 8/13 favourite and "completely outclassed" the opposition, winning by five lengths from Tzaritsa. Cry of Truth made a third appearance in August when she was moved up in distance for the Champion Trophy over six furlongs at Ripon Racecourse. She led for most of the way and won in a juvenile course record time but was less impressive than at York, having to be driven out by Gorton to win by a length from the Norfolk Stakes runner-up Touch of Gold. Hobbs later explained that the filly was somewhat "off-colour" and had coughed on her return from the races.

Cry of Truth ended her season with a run in the Cheveley Park Stakes over six furlongs at Newmarket in October, which was then the only British Group One race confined to two-year-old fillies. Ridden as usual by Gorton, she started at odds of 4/1 in a field of fifteen with the American-bred, Irish-trained Highest Trump, the unbeaten winner of the Queen Mary Stakes going off favourite. The other runners included Delmora, a French filly who had defeated colts to win the Prix de la Salamandre and the Moyglare Stud Stakes winner Tender Camilla from Ireland. The other British contenders included Roussalka, winner of the Cherry Hinton Stakes and Princess Margaret Stakes, and the promising but inexperienced Rose Bowl. Despite concerns that the soft ground would expose her supposed stamina deficiencies, Cry of Truth led from the start and stayed on very strongly in the closing stages to win by two lengths and one length from Delmora and Rose Bowl.

=== 1975: three-year-old season ===
Cry of Truth began her three-year-old season as the 4/1 ante-post favourite for the Classic 1000 Guineas. She prepped for the race with a run in the Nell Gwyn Stakes over seven furlongs at Newmarket in April, in which, as a Group One winner, she was required to concede weight to her rivals. After disputing the lead for half a mile she weakened badly in the closing stages and finished ninth of the ten runners behind Rose Bowl. She did not race again and her retirement from racing was reported in August.

== Assessment ==
There was no International Classification of European two-year-olds in 1974: the official handicappers of Britain, Ireland and France compiled separate rankings for horses which competed in those countries. In the British Free Handicap, Cry of Truth was allotted a weight of 131 pounds, two pounds behind the leading colt Grundy and eleven clear of the next-best filly Highest Trump. The independent Timeform organisation gave her rating of 129, five pounds below Grundy and named her as their best two-year-old filly, despite the fact that they had awarded a rating of 131 to the French-trained filly Broadway Dancer. In their annual Racehorses of 1974 Timeform quoted John Gorton as having described Cry of Truth as "certainly the best filly I have ridden", despite previously having ridden both Jacinth and the leading sprinter Stilvi. She was unrated by Timeform in 1975, although they did describe her a "genuine and consistent", presumably on the basis of her performances in the previous year.

In their book, A Century of Champions, based on the Timeform rating system, John Randall and Tony Morris rated Cry of Truth the fourteenth-best two-year-old filly trained in Britain or Ireland in the 20th century.

== Breeding record ==
Cry of Truth was retired from racing and became broodmare at her owner's stud. She produced at least seven foals between 1977 and 1990.

- Truth Will Out (bay filly, foaled in 1977, sired by Blakeney), won two races and produced several minor winners
- Integrity (grey filly, 1978, by Reform), won three races and finished third in the Cork and Orrery Stakes and produced several winners including the Solario Stakes winner Radwell.
- On Oath (colt, 1981, by Monsanto), won one race
- Woodleys (filly, 1982, by Tyrnavos), unraced, produced the minor winner Dance to the Beat
- Face the Truth (colt, 1986, by Neltino), failed to win in five races
- Albona (filly, 1988, by Neltino), won five minor races
- Innocent Man (gelding, 1990, by Neltino), failed to win in 10 races

== Pedigree ==
Pedigree of Cry of Truth (GB), grey mare, 1972
Sire Town Crier (GB) 1965	Sovereign Path (GB); 1956	Grey Sovereign	Nasullah
Sire Town Crier (GB) 1965	Sovereign Path (GB); 1956	Grey Sovereign	Kong
Sire Town Crier (GB) 1965	Sovereign Path (GB); 1956	Mountain Path	Bobsleigh
Sire Town Crier (GB) 1965	Sovereign Path (GB); 1956	Mountain Path	Path of Peace
Sire Town Crier (GB) 1965	Corsley Bell (FR); 1959	Owen Tudor	Hyperion
Sire Town Crier (GB) 1965	Corsley Bell (FR); 1959	Owen Tudor	Mary Tudor
Sire Town Crier (GB) 1965	Corsley Bell (FR); 1959	Dented Bell	Denturius
Sire Town Crier (GB) 1965	Corsley Bell (FR); 1959	Dented Bell	Boscabell
Dam False Evidence (GB) 1963	Counsel (GB); 1952	Court Martial	Fair Trial
Dam False Evidence (GB) 1963	Counsel (GB); 1952	Court Martial	Instantaneous
Dam False Evidence (GB) 1963	Counsel (GB); 1952	Wheedler	Umidwar
Dam False Evidence (GB) 1963	Counsel (GB); 1952	Wheedler	Miss Minx
Dam False Evidence (GB) 1963	Idolatry (GB); 1948	Umidwar	Blandford
Dam False Evidence (GB) 1963	Idolatry (GB); 1948	Umidwar	Uganda
Dam False Evidence (GB) 1963	Idolatry (GB); 1948	Katmandu	Concerto
Dam False Evidence (GB) 1963	Idolatry (GB); 1948	Katmandu	Gold Leaf (Family: 2-u)

- Cry of Truth was inbred 3 x 4 to the Champion Stakes winner Umidwar, meaning that this stallion appears in both the third and fourth generations of her pedigree.
