= Gentle Thoughts (horse) =

American-bred Thoroughbred racehorse

- Sire: Bold Lad
- Grandsire: Bold Ruler
- Dam: Solid Thought
- Damsire: Solidarity
- Sex: Mare
- Foaled: 23 February 1971
- Country: United States
- Colour: Chestnut
- Breeder: George F Getty II
- Owner: Nelson Bunker Hunt
- Trainer: Ted Curtin
- Record: 8:4-1-1

Major wins
- Flying Childers Stakes (1973); Cheveley Park Stakes (1973)

Awards
- Timeform rating 118 (1973); Top-rated British two-year-old filly (1973); Top-rated Irish two-year-old filly (1973)

Gentle Thoughts (23 February 1971 – after 1985) was Kentucky-bred Irish-trained Thoroughbred racehorse and broodmare. After she showed promising, but unremarkable form in the early part of her two-year-old season, she established herself as one of the leading fillies of her generation in the autumn of 1973, recording consecutive Group One victories in the Flying Childers Stakes and Cheveley Park Stakes. At the end of the year she was the joint-best two-year-old filly in both Britain and Ireland. She failed to reproduce her form as a three-year-old and had little success as a broodmare.

== Background ==
Gentle Thoughts was a "close-coupled, good-quartered" chestnut mare with a white blaze and three long white socks bred in Kentucky by George F Getty II, a grandson of J Paul Getty. She was one of the best horses sired by Bold Lad, the American Champion Two-Year-Old Male Horse of 1964. Her dam, Solid Thought was a high-class racemare who won the Santa Ynez Stakes and the Honeymoon Handicap in 1960. She produced several other winner including Junius who won the Middle Park Stakes in 1976. Solid Thought was a descendant of the broodmare Traverse, making her a distant relative of Hasty Road, Bold Bidder and Intrepidity.

As a yearling, the filly was offered for sale and bought for $22,000 by representatives of Nelson Bunker Hunt. She was sent to Europe where she was trained near Naas in County Kildare by Ted Curtin.

== Racing career ==
=== 1973: two-year-old season ===
Gentle Thoughts made her debut with a win in a five furlong maiden race at Phoenix Park Racecourse and then finished third in a minor race over the same distance at Leopardstown. She then finished second by a head in a nursery (a handicap race for juveniles) at the Curragh, receiving six pounds from the winner Elakonee Wind. Her next race was the Ballymany Stakes at the Curragh when she showed her first signs of high class form as she led from the start and won by three lengths from the 1/2 favourite Pepi Image, a filly who had finished second in the Phoenix Stakes.

In September Gentle Thoughts was sent to England to contest the Group One Flying Childers Stakes over five furlongs at Doncaster Racecourse. Ridden by Lester Piggott she started favourite against six opponents headed by The Blues, a colt who had finished second in the Richmond Stakes and went on to win the Haydock Sprint Cup. The outsider Alexben unseated his jockey exiting the stalls and ran loose for the rest of the race. Gentle Thoughts took the lead in the closing stages and won by three quarters of a length from The Blues, who had been hampered by the riderless Alexben. In October, Gentle Thoughts returned to England for the Cheveley Park Stakes (then the only Group One race restricted to two-year-old fillies) over six furlongs at Newmarket Racecourse. Ridden by the Australian Bill Pyers she started at odds of 9/2 against a field headed by Bitty Girl, a filly who had won all five of her races including the Queen Mary Stakes, Molecomb Stakes and Lowther Stakes as well as Celestial Dawn who had won the Princess Margaret Stakes (beating Highclere, Polygamy and Melchbourne) and the Cherry Hinton Stakes. Gentle Thoughts took the lead from the start and fought off several challenges to win by a length from Red Berry, Lady Tan and Celestial Dawn.

=== 1974: three-year-old season ===
Gentle Thoughts remained in training in 1974 but made no impact in two races. She finished fourteenth of the fifteen runners behind Highclere in the 1000 Guineas (for which she had been the ante-post co-favourite) and last behind Bay Express in the King's Stand Stakes.

== Assessment ==
There was no International Classification of European two-year-olds in 1973: the official handicappers of Britain, Ireland and France compiled separate rankings for horses which competed in those countries. In the British Free Handicap, Gentle Thoughts was allotted a weight of 120 pounds, making her the equal-best two-year-old filly of the season, alongside Melchbourne and Bitty Girl. In the Irish Free Handicap she was rated the joint-best two-year-old filly, level with her stable companion Cake. The independent Timeform organisation gave the filly a rating of 118, five pounds behind Melchbourne and three behind Bitty Girl. In their annual Racehorses of 1973 Timeform predicted that she would be a "very dangerous candidate" for the 1000 Guineas. The filly was not given a rating by Timeform in 1974 and did not receive a weight in the official British handicap.

== Breeding record ==
Gentle Thoughts was retired from racing to become a broodmare in the United States, but had little success, producing one minor winner from eight known foals, the last of which was born in 1985.

Her foals were:

- Lord Leighton, a chestnut colt, foaled in 1976, sired by Vaguely Noble. Failed to win in four races.
- Zillionaire, chestnut filly, 1977, by Vaguely Noble. Won one race.
- Anita Garibaldi, chestnut filly, 1979, by Empery. Unraced
- Gentle J O, dark bay or brown filly, 1980, by J O Tobin. Failed to win in ten races.
- Thought Provoker, bay filly, 1981, by Exceller. Unraced
- Gex, bay colt, 1983, by Exceller. Failed to win in five races.
- Royal Statute, bay colt, 1984, by Alleged
- Gentle Eyes, filly, 1985, by Gorytus. Failed to win in two races.

== Pedigree ==
Pedigree of Gentle Thoughts (USA), chestnut mare, 1971
Sire Bold Lad (USA) 1962	Bold Ruler (USA); 1954	Nasrullah	Nearco
Sire Bold Lad (USA) 1962	Bold Ruler (USA); 1954	Nasrullah	Mumtaz Begum
Sire Bold Lad (USA) 1962	Bold Ruler (USA); 1954	Miss Disco	Discovery
Sire Bold Lad (USA) 1962	Bold Ruler (USA); 1954	Miss Disco	Outdone
Sire Bold Lad (USA) 1962	Misty Morn (USA); 1952	Princequillo	Prince Rose
Sire Bold Lad (USA) 1962	Misty Morn (USA); 1952	Princequillo	Cosquilla
Sire Bold Lad (USA) 1962	Misty Morn (USA); 1952	Grey Flight	Mahmoud
Sire Bold Lad (USA) 1962	Misty Morn (USA); 1952	Grey Flight	Planetoid
Dam Solid Thought (USA) 1957	Solidarity (USA); 1945	Alibhai	Hyperion
Dam Solid Thought (USA) 1957	Solidarity (USA); 1945	Alibhai	Teresina
Dam Solid Thought (USA) 1957	Solidarity (USA); 1945	Jerrybuilt	Empire Builder
Dam Solid Thought (USA) 1957	Solidarity (USA); 1945	Jerrybuilt	Varnish
Dam Solid Thought (USA) 1957	Unforgettable (USA); 1951	Burning Dream	Bimelech
Dam Solid Thought (USA) 1957	Unforgettable (USA); 1951	Burning Dream	By Mistake
Dam Solid Thought (USA) 1957	Unforgettable (USA); 1951	Cantadora	Case Ace
Dam Solid Thought (USA) 1957	Unforgettable (USA); 1951	Cantadora	Comeover (Family:3-n)
