= Arnold Weinstock =

English industrialist and businessman (1924–2002)

The Right Honourable The Lord Weinstock
- Arnold Weinstock

Member of the House of Lords
- Lord Temporal
- Life peerage 17 July 1980 – 23 July 2002

Personal details
- Born: 29 July 1924
- Died: 23 July 2002 (aged 77)

Arnold Weinstock, Baron Weinstock, Kt., OMRI, FSS (29 July 1924 – 23 July 2002) was an English industrialist and businessman known for making General Electric Company one of Britain's most profitable companies. The City (London) criticized Weinstock for his financial caution but after he retired as managing director in 1996, under his successor a series of ill-judged acquisitions led to catastrophic losses.

== Early life ==
Born in Stoke Newington, Hackney, London, the son of working class Polish Jewish immigrants Golda (née Schag) and Simon Weinstock, Arnold Weinstock was educated at the London School of Economics.

== Career ==
He was a junior administrative officer in the Admiralty in the period 1944–1947. In 1949, he married Netta Sobell, the daughter of industrialist Michael Sobell. The couple had two children, Simon (1952–1996) and Susan (b 1955). Lady Weinstock died in 2019.

In 1954 he joined his father-in law's electronics company, Radio & Allied Industries Ltd., and in 1963 orchestrated its merger with the General Electric Company, becoming the largest shareholder of GEC. He served as a member of the board of directors from 1961 to 1963 and was managing director from 1963 to 1996, thence chairman Emeritus. He transformed the firm, raising its turnover from £100m in 1960 to £11bn at his retirement in 1996.

He was a director of Rolls-Royce (1971) Ltd from 1971 to 1973. He was a significant investor in London Weekend Television at its launch in 1968. He was Vice-President of the Friends of the Ravenna Festival (1993–1994), a trustee of the British Museum (1985–1996), the Royal Philharmonic Society and the Foundation Fund (1984–1992). He became a friend of the conductor Riccardo Muti, whose recordings he chose on the Desert Island Discs radio programme. He was also senior trustee of the Next Century Foundation, a peace process organisation he helped establish. He established the Weinstock Fund, a charitable foundation that supports a variety of benevolent and cultural causes.

He became an Honorary Fellow of his alma mater, LSE, in 1985. The Guardian newspaper called him "Britain's premier post-second-world-war industrialist." He was appointed a Knight Bachelor in the 1970 Birthday Honours for services to export and was created a life peer in the 1980 Birthday Honours as Baron Weinstock, of Bowden in the County of Wiltshire on 17 July 1980. He was also a Fellow of the Royal Statistical Society, an Honorary Fellow of Peterhouse, Cambridge (from 1982), and an Honorary Bencher of Gray's Inn (from 1982). He became a Commander of the Ordine al Merito of Italy in 1991 and an Officer of the Legion of Honour of France in 1992. He was awarded an Honorary DSc: Salford, 1975; Aston, 1976; University of Bath, 1978; Reading, 1978; Ulster, 1987; Hon. LLD: Leeds, 1978; Wales, 1985; Keele, 1997; Hon. DTech Loughborough, 1981; DUniv Anglia Poly., 1994; Hon. DEconSc London, 1997.

== Horse racing ==
A member of the Jockey Club, Weinstock owned a number of thoroughbred racehorses. He and his father-in-law, Michael Sobell, became owners in 1957 and were immediately successful when purchasing London Cry, who won the 1958 Cambridgeshire Handicap. In 1960 they purchased the Ballymacoll Stud in Ireland. One of their early successful racehorses was a colt called Reform, who was the champion miler of 1967 and won amongst other races the St. James's Palace Stakes Sussex Stakes and Champion Stakes. Up until 1971 his horses were trained by Sir Gordon Richards but in 1970 with his father in law he purchased the West Ilsley stables from Jakie Astor, whereupon Dick Hern became his trainer. They owned and bred the St Leger Stakes runner-up Homeric. In 1974 Gaily, a purchased filly, won the Irish 1,000 Guineas. Their horse Admetus won the Washington International Stakes and the Prince of Wales's Stakes. A few years later they bred and owned Cistus who won the Lupe Stakes, Child Stakes, Nassau Stakes and the Prix de l'Opéra. Their horse Troy won the 200th Epsom Derby in 1979. In 1981 they sold the stables to the Queen.

Sun Princess won both the Epsom Oaks and St Leger. She in turn bred for them the Champion Two Year Old of 1988 Prince of Dance. By now the partnership's horses were being trained by Sir Michael Stoute, although Hern remained as a trainer up until 1997 and other trainers such as Ian Balding, Peter Chapple-Hyam and Roger Charlton trained at various times for them. Upon Sir Michael Sobell's death, Weinstock continued his racing activities, in partnership with his son Simon. They owned 1995 Irish Two Thousand Guineas and Champion Stakes winner Spectrum. On the premature death of Simon Weinstock, the racing activities continued but soon after raced under the name of the Ballymacoll Stud. He also owned Pilsudski, whose wins included the 1996 Grosser Preis von Baden and Breeders' Cup Turf plus the 1997 Japan Cup; Golan (who won the Two Thousand Guineas Stakes and the King George VI and Queen Elizabeth Stakes after Weinstock's death) and Islington (who won the Musidora Stakes, and after Weinstock's death won the Nassau Stakes, the Yorkshire Oaks (twice) and the Breeders' Cup Filly & Mare Turf). Ballymacoll Stud continues as a stud owned by his family to this day. The Weinstock developed families of Reform (but also of Hellenic, Golan and Islington), Sun Prince (but also of Sun Princess and Spectrum), and Gaily (but also of Pilsudski) continue in the stud.

== Arms ==
Coat of arms of Arnold Weinstock

Coronet
A Coronet of a Baron
Crest
Upon a Wreath Argent Or and Azure on a Mount Vert two Musical Pipes saltirewise Or between two Stakes entwined by Vines fructed proper and ensigned by a Crown Rayonny Gules
Escutcheon
Dancetty Argent and Gules on each of three Piles two issuant in chief and one in base Azure a Sun in Splendour its straight rays each tipped with Flame Or
Supporters
Dexter: a Male Griffin Azure beaked rayed and gorged with a Crown Tridenty and Forelegs Or; Sinister: a Horse Or gorged with a Wreath of Trefoils the stalks entwined Vert

== References and sources ==
Sources

- Who's Who 2001
- Hutchinson Encyclopedia of Britain 2001
- Alex Brummer, Weinstock: The Life and Times of Britain's Premier Industrialist (HarperCollinsBusiness, 1998).
- Timesonline article on the Weinstock Fund, charitable foundation
