= Pilsudski (horse) =

Irish-bred, British-trained Thoroughbred racehorse

- Racing colours of Arnold Weinstock
- Sire: Polish Precedent
- Grandsire: Danzig
- Dam: Cocotte
- Damsire: Troy
- Sex: Stallion
- Foaled: 23 April 1992
- Died: 4 June 2015 (aged 23)
- Country: Ireland
- Colour: Bay
- Breeder: Ballymacoll Stud
- Owner: Lord Weinstock
- Trainer: Michael Stoute
- Record: 23: 11-7-1
- Earnings: US$3,461,555

Major wins
- Grosser Preis von Baden (1996); Breeders' Cup Turf (1996); Eclipse Stakes (1997); Irish Champion Stakes (1997); Champion Stakes (1997); Japan Cup (1997)

Awards
- European Champion Older Horse (1997)

Honours
- Timeform rating: 134

Pilsudski (23 April 1992 – 4 June 2015) was an Irish-bred, British-trained Thoroughbred racehorse and sire. In a four-season career from 1994 to 1997, he progressed from winning modest group races to be regarded as one of the best racehorses in the world. He won eleven races in five countries, six of them at Group One level. He also finished second in successive runnings of the Prix de l'Arc de Triomphe.

== Background ==
Pilsudski was a "big, imposing" bay horse. He was bred in Ireland by his owner's Ballymacoll Stud near Dunboyne, County Meath. Pilsudski was sired by Polish Precedent, a son of Champion sire Danzig out of the Troy mare Cocotte.

Polish Precedent won the Prix Jacques le Marois and the Prix du Moulin in 1989 and went on to sire the winners of almost five hundred races. Apart from Pilsudski, his most notable offspring was the champion miler Rakti. Apart from Pilsudski, Cocotte produced at least seven other winners, most notably his half-sister, Fine Motion, the winner of the Queen Elizabeth II Commemorative Cup and the Shūka Sho.

Pilsudski was trained throughout his career by Michael Stoute at Newmarket, Suffolk. He was jointly owned by Lord Weinstock and his son Simon, until Simon's death in May 1996. Pilsudski was named after the Polish politician and patriot Józef Piłsudski (1867–1935) who was known for his love for horses.

== Racing career ==
=== 1994: two-year-old season ===
Pilsudski's racing career began unremarkably in September 1994 when he ran sixth in a nineteen-runner maiden race at Newmarket behind the future Gran Premio del Jockey Club winner Court of Honour. He was then made favourite for a similar race at Leicester but made no impression, finishing eighth.

=== 1995: three-year-old season ===
Pilsudski failed to win in his early three-year-old career, finishing second in a maiden at Ripon and then running down the field in the King George V Stakes at Royal Ascot.

In July, Pilsudski won at his fifth attempt, staying on strongly to win a mile and a quarter handicap at Newmarket under a light weight. Two weeks later, he followed up over a mile and a half at Glorious Goodwood, winning another handicap by a neck from Rokeby Bowl. On his final start of the year he finished third to the future Caulfield Cup winner Taufan's Melody in a handicap at Ascot in September.

He had proved himself to be a useful handicapper, but his official handicap rating of 95 suggested that he was about a stone below Group class.

=== 1996: four-year-old season ===
1996 saw Pilsudski make the transition from handicapper to Group One winner. On his debut he started a 16/1 outsider for the Gordon Richards Stakes at Sandown, but belied his odds by running second to his stable companion Singspiel. A month later in the Group Three Brigadier Gerard Stakes over the same course and distance he recorded his first important win, beating Lucky Di by half a length.

At Royal Ascot, Pilsudski was moved up to Group Two class for the Prince of Wales's Stakes for which was made 4/1 favourite and was reportedly well-fancied by his trainer. He disputed the lead until the straight, but then faded into eighth place behind First Island. It was to be the last occasion on which Pilsudski finished out of the first three. In August he was sent abroad for the first time and won the Group Three Royal Whip Stakes at The Curragh, taking the lead two furlongs out and beating I'm Supposin by one and a half lengths. in "convincing" style.

It was in the autumn of 1996 that Pilsudski first showed his best form. In September he recorded a Group One win at his first attempt, taking the lead a furlong out and staying on strongly under pressure to win the Grosser Preis von Baden by three quarters of a length. Although he was obviously improving, Pilsudski was not regarded as a serious contender for the Prix de l'Arc de Triomphe and started at odds of just over 22/1. Ridden by Walter Swinburn Pilsudski tracked the leader Helissio throughout the race. In the straight the French colt pulled away to win easily, but Pilsudski stayed on strongly to hold on to second place ahead of numerous top class performers including Swain, Shaamit and Pentire.

On his final start of the year, Pilsudski was sent to Canada for the Breeders' Cup Turf at Woodbine Racetrack. He was matched against his stable companion Singspiel, six months on from their meeting at Sandown. The rest of the European challenge included Swain and the St Leger winner Shantou, while the North American runners were headed by the local champion Chief Bearheart and Diplomatic Jet from the United States. Ridden again by Swinburn, Pilsudski raced prominently as first Diplomatic Jet and then Singspiel led. In the straight Pilsudski moved up to challenge his stablemate and pulled ahead inside the final furlong to win by one and a quarter lengths. Swain and Shantou finished next to complete a "clean sweep" for European-trained horses. Much attention was given to the human aspects of the victory: Swinburn had recovered from life-threatening injuries earlier in the year, and had been criticised for his riding style in previous American races, while Stoute recorded his first Breeders' Cup victory in fifteen attempts.

=== 1997: five-year-old season ===
In 1997 Michael Kinane took over as Pilsudski's regular jockey, and the horse had his most successful season, winning four Group One races from eight starts. His season began slowly, as he finished a well beaten third to Helissio in the Prix Ganay and was then beaten by Predappio when starting favourite for the Hardwicke Stakes at Royal Ascot, where he was unsuited by the soft ground.

At Sandown in July he won his most important European race to date, taking the lead a furlong out in the Eclipse Stakes and running on well to beat The Derby winner Benny the Dip by one and a quarter lengths with the odds-on favourite Bosra Sham (who had been unable to obtain a clear run) in third. Although much of the coverage of the race focused on Bosra Sham's defeat, Pilsudski was given credit for his win and was described by Mick Kinane as "fit, hard and ready to fight." In the King George VI and Queen Elizabeth Stakes at Ascot three weeks later Pilsudski ran on strongly after being switched to the outside to finish second to Swain, ahead of Helissio, Singspiel, Shantou and Predappio in a contest which was described as the "race of the decade".

Once again, Pilsudski produced his best form in the Autumn. The build-up for the Irish Champion Stakes in September suggested that the race was effectively a match between Pilsudski and the three-year-old Desert King, the winner of the Irish 2000 Guineas and Derby. Pilsudski tracked the leaders before taking the lead in the straight and pulling well clear. Even though he was eased down close to the finish he still crossed the line four and a half lengths ahead of Desert King. The performance was described by one national newspaper correspondent as "truly awesome". In his second attempt at the Prix de l'Arc de Triomphe he started third favourite and again proved to be a clear second best, finishing five lengths behind Peintre Celebre, but two and a half lengths ahead of the rest of the field.

Two weeks later at Newmarket, Pilsudski was made evens favourite for his final European start in the Champion Stakes. Kinane held the horse up before switching him to the outside to obtain a clear run inside the final quarter of a mile. Pilsudski accelerated to catch and pass the French colt Loup Sauvage inside the final furlong and pulled away to win by two lengths. The Sunday Mirror described his win as "a demolition job" and Kinane paid tribute to the winner, saying that "they don't come any tougher than this horse - not only is he the toughest I've ridden, he's one of the best." On his final start, Pilsudski was sent to Tokyo for the Japan Cup. Pilsudski was held up in the early stages before producing a sustained run in the straight to take the lead inside the final furlong. In a "courageous, fibre-testing performance", he held off a strong late challenge from the Tenno Sho winner Air Groove to win by a neck.

Pilsudski was then retired from racing and was sent back to Japan to begin his stud career in January 1998.

== Assessment, honours and awards ==
Pilsudski was named European Champion Older Horse of 1997 at the Cartier Racing Awards. He was also the highest ranked older horse of 1997 in the International Classification with a rating of 134.

== Stud career ==
Pilsudski stood at stud at the Shizunai Stallion Station at Hokkaidō in Japan from 1997. After a six-season stud career in Japan with a disappointing cumulative average earnings index of 0.36, he was purchased by the Irish National Stud and Anngrove Stud and was returned to Ireland in 2003. He was based at the Anngrove Stud at Mountmellick, County Laois with a fee of €2,500 in 2010. Pilsudski died at the age of 23 on 4 June 2015.

== Pedigree ==
Pedigree of Pilsudski (IRE), bay stallion 1992
| Sire Polish Precedent (USA) 1986 | Danzig (USA); 1977 | Northern Dancer | Nearctic |
| Sire Polish Precedent (USA) 1986 | Danzig (USA); 1977 | Northern Dancer | Natalma |
| Sire Polish Precedent (USA) 1986 | Danzig (USA); 1977 | Pas de Nom | Admiral's Voyage |
| Sire Polish Precedent (USA) 1986 | Danzig (USA); 1977 | Pas de Nom | Petitioner |
| Sire Polish Precedent (USA) 1986 | Past Example (USA); 1976 | Buckpasser | Tom Fool |
| Sire Polish Precedent (USA) 1986 | Past Example (USA); 1976 | Buckpasser | Busanda |
| Sire Polish Precedent (USA) 1986 | Past Example (USA); 1976 | Bold Example | Bold Lad |
| Sire Polish Precedent (USA) 1986 | Past Example (USA); 1976 | Bold Example | Lady Be Good |
| Dam Cocotte (GB) 1983 | Troy (IRE); 1976 | Petingo | Petition |
| Dam Cocotte (GB) 1983 | Troy (IRE); 1976 | Petingo | Alcazar |
| Dam Cocotte (GB) 1983 | Troy (IRE); 1976 | La Milo | Hornbeam |
| Dam Cocotte (GB) 1983 | Troy (IRE); 1976 | La Milo | Pin Prick |
| Dam Cocotte (GB) 1983 | Gay Milly (FR); 1977 | Mill Reef | Never Bend |
| Dam Cocotte (GB) 1983 | Gay Milly (FR); 1977 | Mill Reef | Milan Mill |
| Dam Cocotte (GB) 1983 | Gay Milly (FR); 1977 | Gaily | Sir Gaylord |
| Dam Cocotte (GB) 1983 | Gay Milly (FR); 1977 | Gaily | Spearfish (Family: 11) |
