= Hippodamia =

Hippodamia or Hippodameia may refer to:

- Hippodamia (mythology), various figures in Greek mythology, including:
  - Hippodamia (daughter of Oenomaus), and wife of Pelops
  - Hippodamia (wife of Pirithous)
  - Hippodamia (wife of Autonous)

Hippodamia or Hippodameia may also refer to:

- Hippodamia (beetle), a genus of ladybirds
- Hippodamia (horse), a French-trained thoroughbred racehorse
- 692 Hippodamia, an asteroid
- Hippodameia (Ἱπποδάμεια), an agora at Piraeus named after the builder Hippodamus of Miletus
