= Reform (horse) =

Irish-bred Thoroughbred racehorse

- Racing colours of Michael Sobell
- Sire: Pall Mall
- Grandsire: Palestine
- Dam: Country House
- Damsire: Vieux Manoir
- Sex: Stallion
- Foaled: 1964
- Country: Ireland
- Colour: Bay
- Breeder: Ballymacoll Stud
- Owner: Michael Sobell
- Trainer: Gordon Richards
- Record: 14: 11-2-0
- Earnings: £44,721

Major wins
- Granville Stakes (1966); Rous Memorial Stakes (1966); Clarence House Stakes (1966); St James's Stakes (1967); St James's Palace Stakes (1967); Sussex Stakes (1967); Queen Elizabeth II Stakes (1967); Champion Stakes (1967)

Awards
- Timeform top-rated three-year-old (1967); Timeform rating: 132

Reform (1964–1983) was an Irish-bred British-trained Thoroughbred racehorse and sire. In a racing career which lasted from April 1966 until October 1967 he won eleven of his fourteen races. As a two-year-old he was beaten on his debut but won his remaining six races and was rated among the best colts of his generation in Britain. Reform was never entered in the British Classic Races, but proved himself to be an outstanding three-year-old in 1967, winning five of his seven starts. After winning the St James's Stakes, St James's Palace Stakes, Sussex Stakes and Queen Elizabeth II Stakes he ended his career by beating The Derby winner Royal Palace in the Champion Stakes.

== Background ==
Reform was a small bay horse with a white sock on his left hind leg bred by the Ballymacoll Stud in County Meath, Ireland. He was one of the best horses sired by the Queen's stallion Pall Mall, who won the 2000 Guineas in 1958. His dam, Country House, bred by Dorothy Paget, was a granddaughter of Coventry Belle, a sister of the 1000 Guineas and Oaks Stakes winner Godiva. Country House won three minor races before becoming a highly influential broodmare: apart from Reform, her descendants include The Derby winner North Light and the 2000 Guineas and King George VI and Queen Elizabeth Stakes winner Golan.

Reform was born with a slight malformation of his foreleg and was small and weak as a yearling. His breeders' decided not to send him to the sales, as it was felt that his unimpressive appearance would not attract buyers and would reflect poorly on the stud's reputation. The colt was therefore retained and raced in the colours of the Ballymacoll Stud's owner Michael Sobell. The colt was named after the Reform Club, a gentlemen's club on the south side of Pall Mall, and sent into training with Gordon Richards at Whitsbury in Hampshire. As he seemed unlikely to develop into a top-class runner, Reform was not entered in the classics.

== Racing career ==
=== 1966: two-year-old season ===
Reform began his racing career in early April 1966 when he finished fourth to Manacle in the Half Moon Stakes over the minimum distance of five furlongs at Kempton Park Racecourse. He was then campaigned at Bath Racecourse where he won the five furlong Lansdown Plate and the Somerdale Plate over the same distance. Reform continued to be raced over five furlongs, beating Green Park in the Berkshire Stakes at Newbury Racecourse and winning the Granville Stakes at Ascot in July. He then moved up in distance to win a Rous Memorial Stakes at Goodwood Racecourse and ended his season by recording his sixth consecutive victory in the Clarence House Stakes at Ascot.

=== 1967: three-year-old season ===
Although he was ineligible for the classics, Reform began his second season in the seven furlong Greenham Stakes, which is regarded as a trial race for the 2000 Guineas. He appeared short of full fitness and was beaten a neck by Play High, with Wolver Hollow in third place. At the Epsom Derby meeting, Reform won the eight and a half furlong St James's Stakes, the race now known as the Diomed Stakes, beating Golden Horus, a colt who had won the July Stakes and Gimcrack Stakes in 1966 and had finished fourth to Royal Palace in the 2000 Guineas. At the same Epsom meeting, Royal Palace won the Derby.

At Royal Ascot, Reform was matched against Bold Lad (IRE) in the St James's Palace Stakes over one mile. Ridden as in all his major races by the Australian jockey Scobie Breasley, he started the 4/6 favourite and won from Chinwag, with Bold Lad in third. At Goodwood Reform contested the Sussex Stakes, a race which was then confined to three- and four-year-old horses, and started the even money favourite. He took the lead inside the final furlong and accelerated clear to win by one and a half lengths from Supreme Sovereign and Bluerullah. Over the same course and distance in August he finished second in the inaugural running of the Wills Mile, beaten a length by St Chad. On 30 September, Reform started 6/5 favourite for the Queen Elizabeth II Stakes over a mile at Ascot and "turned the race into a procession" winning by ten lengths from the four-year-old Track Spare, with St Chad in third. Reform and Royal Palace finally met in the Champion Stakes over ten furlongs at Newmarket in October. Ridden as usual by Breasley, Reform started at odds of 100/30 and won from the French-trained Taj Dewan, with Royal Palace in third.

== Assessment ==
In the 1966 Free Handicap, an official assessment of the best two-year-olds to race in Britain, Reform was assigned a weight of 126 pound, seven pounds below the top-rated Bold Lad (IRE) and four pounds below Royal Palace. In 1967 the independent Timeform organisation awarded him a rating of 132, making him the top-rated three-year-old of the year, a pound ahead of Royal Palace.

== Stud record ==
Reform was retired from racing to become a breeding stallion. He sired one British classic winner in the filly Polygamy who won the Oaks Stakes in 1974. The best of his other progeny included Roi Lear (Prix du Jockey Club), Admetus (Washington, D.C. International Stakes), Lancastrian (Prix Ganay), Valiant Heart (Grand Prix de Paris), New Model (Gran Criterium) and Formulate (Fillies' Mile). He died in 1983.

== Pedigree ==
Pedigree of Reform (IRE), bay stallion 1964
Sire Pall Mall (IRE) 1955	Palestine (GB); 1947	Fair Trial	Fairway
Sire Pall Mall (IRE) 1955	Palestine (GB); 1947	Fair Trial	Lady Juror
Sire Pall Mall (IRE) 1955	Palestine (GB); 1947	Una	Tetratema
Sire Pall Mall (IRE) 1955	Palestine (GB); 1947	Una	Uganda
Sire Pall Mall (IRE) 1955	Malapert (GB); 1946	Portlaw	Beresford
Sire Pall Mall (IRE) 1955	Malapert (GB); 1946	Portlaw	Portree
Sire Pall Mall (IRE) 1955	Malapert (GB); 1946	Malatesta	Sansovino
Sire Pall Mall (IRE) 1955	Malapert (GB); 1946	Malatesta	Tetranella
Dam Country House (GB) 1955	Vieux Manoir (FR); 1947	Brantôme	Blandford
Dam Country House (GB) 1955	Vieux Manoir (FR); 1947	Brantôme	Vitamine
Dam Country House (GB) 1955	Vieux Manoir (FR); 1947	Vieille Maison	Finglas
Dam Country House (GB) 1955	Vieux Manoir (FR); 1947	Vieille Maison	Vieille Canaille
Dam Country House (GB) 1955	Miss Coventry (GB); 1943	Mieuxce	Massine
Dam Country House (GB) 1955	Miss Coventry (GB); 1943	Mieuxce	L'Olivete
Dam Country House (GB) 1955	Miss Coventry (GB); 1943	Coventry Belle	Hyperion
Dam Country House (GB) 1955	Miss Coventry (GB); 1943	Coventry Belle	Carpet Slipper (Family: 5-h)
