= Radio & Allied Industries =

Radio & Allied Industries Ltd. was a British electronics company formed in 1956 from the merger of the Sobell Group and McMichael Radio Ltd.

The Sobell Group was formed by Michael Sobell to manufacture radio sets. The company grew rapidly thanks to lucrative contracts it gained during World War II. Post war the company opened a new factory near Hirwaun, Aberdare, south Wales to manufacture radio and television sets. An employee of the company was Sobell's son-in-law, Arnold Weinstock who would later take over the management of GEC.

McMichael Radio Ltd. was founded in 1920 by Leslie McMichael. In 1922, the company opened a new factory in Slough. During World War II, McMichael produced a wide variety of radio equipment for the war effort. After the war the company manufactured thousands of sonobuoys for use by the Royal Navy and Royal Air Force.

In 1956, the Sobell Group and McMichael Radio Ltd. merged to form Radio and Allied Industries Ltd. Following the merger all manufacture of domestic radio and television sets was concentrated at Sobell's factory in South Wales whereas the production of military electronics was undertaken at the McMichael works in Slough. In 1960, the company acquired Masteradio Ltd.

In 1961, Radio and Allied Industries Ltd. was itself acquired by the General Electric Company (GEC).
