= Lianga (horse) =

American-bred Thoroughbred racehorse

- Racing silks of Daniel Wildenstein
- Sire: Dancer's Image
- Grandsire: Native Dancer
- Dam: Leven Ones
- Damsire: Sailor
- Sex: Mare
- Foaled: 1971
- Country: United States
- Colour: Grey
- Breeder: Mrs. Bruce M. Donaldson
- Owner: Daniel Wildenstein
- Trainer: Albert Klimscha; Angel Penna Sr.
- Record: 21: 11-2-3

Major wins
- Prix du Bois (1973); Prix Robert Papin (1973); Prix Imprudence (1974); Prix Maurice de Gheest (1974); July Cup (1975); Prix Jacques Le Marois (1975); Prix de l'Abbaye (1975); Vernons Sprint Cup (1975)

Awards
- Timeform top-rated older female (1975); Top-rated older female in Britain (1975); Timeform rating 120 (1973), 116 (1974) 133 (1975)

Lianga (1971 – after 1988) was an American-bred, French-trained Thoroughbred racehorse and broodmare. Equally adept as a sprinter or as a miler, she won eleven of her twenty-one contests in a racing career which lasted from May 1973 until November 1975. She won her first four races as a two-year-old including the Prix du Bois and the Prix Robert Papin. In the following year she won the Prix Imprudence and Prix Maurice de Gheest. Lianga reached her peak as a four-year-old in 1975 when she recorded victories in the July Cup, Prix Jacques Le Marois, Prix de l'Abbaye and Vernons Sprint Cup and was rated the best older female racehorse in Europe by Timeform, ahead of Allez France and Dahlia. After her retirement from racing she became an influential broodmare whose female-line descendants have included Danehill Dancer and Street Sense.

== Background ==
Lianga was a "strong, attractive" grey mare with a diamond-shaped white star bred in Maryland by Mrs Bruce M. Donaldson. During her early racing career she was so dark in colour that she was officially described as black until 1975. She was one of the best horses sired by Dancer's Image who won the 1968 Kentucky Derby but was disqualified after traces of phenylbutazone were discovered in a post-race urinalysis. As a breeding stallion, he stood in Europe and Japan, siring several other good winners including the July Cup winner Saritamer and the King's Stand Stakes winner Godswalk. Lianga's dam Leven Ones won two minor races in the United States and went on to produce the National Stakes winner Diamonds Are Trump. Leven Ones' grand-dam Star Student was a half-sister of the 1951 Kentucky Derby winner Count Turf.

Lianga was acquired by Daniel Wildenstein and was sent to Europe to be trained by Albert Klimscha in France. She was ridden in most of her races by Yves Saint-Martin.

== Racing career ==
=== 1973: two-year-old season ===
Lianga began her racing career in a race over 900 metres at Saint-Cloud Racecourse in May and won by one and a half lengths from the favourite Hippodamia. She followed up three weeks later by winning again over the same course and distance. The filly's first major test came at Longchamp Racecourse in June in the Prix du Bois over 1000 metres. She moved up to take the lead just after half way and drew clear in the closing stages to in by two and a half lengths from the colt Soyez Brave with Hippodamia in fourth. Lianga was then stepped up in class and distance again for the Group One Prix Robert Papin over 1100 metres at Maisons-Laffitte Racecourse on 29 July. Ridden by Yves Saint-Martin she started 2.2/1 second favourite behind the British-trained colt Habat, a six-length winner of the Norfolk Stakes at Royal Ascot. Lianga was among the leaders from the start before accelerating to win by two lengths from Soyez Brave with Hippodamia third and Habat a disappointing sixth. On 19 August, the filly started second favourite behind the undefeated colt Nonoalco in the Prix Morny over 1200 metres at Deauville Racecourse. After starting very poorly, Lianga recovered to take the lead 400 metres from the finish but after being overtaken by the favourite she faded in the closing stages and finished fourth of the seven runners behind Nonoalco, Insistence and the Irish-trained Cake.

=== 1974: three-year-old season ===
In 1974, Lianga moved stables and was trained for the rest of her racing career by the Argentinian Angel Penna Sr. She began her second season in the Prix Imprudence over 1400 metres at Maisons-Laffitte on 5 April. She started the 3/5 favourite and won by three lengths from Insistence. A month later, Lianga was made the 6/5 favourite for the Poule d'Essai des Pouliches over 1600 metres at Longchamp but finished eighth of the nine runners behind the 30/1 outsider Dumka.

Lianga was off the course for three months before reappearing in the Prix Maurice de Gheest over 1300 metres at Deauville in August in which she was matched against older horses. Ridden by Peter Cook, she won easily by five lengths from Tour Nobel with the British-trained New Model (a close second to Saritamer in the July Cup on his previous start) a further three lengths back in fourth. Lianga (reunited with Saint-Martin) faced Nonoalco for the second time in the Prix du Rond Point over 1600 metres at Longchamp on 8 September. Lianga took the lead on the outside in the last 200 metres but was caught in the final strides and beaten a short neck by Nonoalco with Lisaro third and Northern Taste fourth. Three weeks later, the filly (coupled in the betting with her stable companion Mount Hagen) started second favourite behind Nonoalco in the Group One Prix du Moulin over the same course and distance. Racing on very soft ground, she finished third behind Mount Hagen and Northern Taste, with Nonoalco unplaced. On her final appearance failed to reproduce her best form in the Prix de la Forêt on 27 October, finishing sixth of the sixteen runners behind Northern Taste.

=== 1975: four-year-old season ===
On her first appearance of 1975, Lianga won a minor race at Évry in May, beating Bayraan by one and a half lengths. She started favourite for the Prix de la Porte Maillot on 29 June at Longchamp, but was beaten a neck by the three-year-old Hamada, with Boldboy and Northern Taste fourth and fifth in a blanket finish. In the following month she was sent to England and started at odds of 10/1 for the July Cup (then a Group Two race) over six furlongs at Newmarket Racecourse. Her opponents included several major winners including Steel Heart (Duke of York Stakes), Boone's Cabin (Wokingham Stakes), Blue Cashmere (Temple Stakes), Realty (Prix du Gros Chêne) Auction Ring (July Stakes) and Roman Warrior. Ridden by Saint-Martin, Lianga took the lead in the final furlong and won by half a length and a neck from Steel Heart and Realty. Timeform described the July Cup as "an exciting contest" and reported that Lianga appeared to win "with something to spare".

Lianga was moved up from sprinting to compete over longer distances in her next four races. She returned to England for the Sussex Stakes over one mile at Goodwood Racecourse and produced a strong finish to take third place beaten a neck and a short head by the leading British milers Bolkonski and Rose Bowl. At Deauville on 10 August, the filly started 2.8/1 second favourite behind the Prix du Palais Royal winner Dandy Lute in the Prix Jacques Le Marois over 1600 metres. The other contenders included Sky Commander and Delmora, first and second in the Prix Maurice de Gheest and the Prix Messidor winner Son of Silver. Lianga won easily, drawing away from her rivals in the closing stages to take the Group One prize by six lengths from Sky Commander. According to Timeform, she "brushed aside" her opponents "as though they were selling platers". The filly started favourite for the Prix du Rond Point on 7 September but finished third behind Delmora and El Toro, to whom she was conceding twelve pounds and three pounds respectively. In the Prix du Moulin three weeks later, Lianga again started favourite, but finished fourth behind Delmora, Son of Silver and Riot in Paris. Timeform expressed the view that she was an unlucky loser and "would almost certainly have won with a clear run".

A week after her defeat in the Moulin, Lianga returned to sprinting at Longchamp for the Prix de l'Abbaye over 1000 metres on 5 October and was made 6/5 favourite despite racing over the distance for the first time in two years. Her opponents included Swingtime (Cork and Orrery Stakes), Realty, Bay Express and Hot Spark (Flying Childers Stakes). Lianga produced a strong late run to take the lead in the final strides and won by two short heads from the three-year-old colts Primo Rico and Mendip Man. Three weeks later, the filly started favourite for the Prix de la Forêt over 1400 metres but produced one of her few poor performances, finishing eighth of the fifteen runners behind the two-year-old Roan Star. Immediately after the race it was announced that Lianga had been retired, but she returned for one more race. In November, she was sent to England and started the 2/1 favourite for the Vernons Sprint Cup over six furlongs at Haydock Park Racecourse. Racing on very soft ground, she was restrained by Saint-Martin in the early stages before accelerating a quarter mile from home to win by three-quarters of a length from Roman Warrior with Garda's Revenge (Lianga's two-year-old brother) in third.

== Breeding record ==
Lianga was retired from racing to become a broodmare in Kentucky. She produced at least ten foals and seven winners between 1977 and 1988. Her offspring included:

- La Legende, a brown filly, foaled in 1977, sired by Reviewer, won three races
- Long Legend, chestnut filly, 1978, by Reviewer, won four races, dam of Mr Greeley (Swale Stakes, sire of Finsceal Beo), great-grand-dam of Street Sense
- Lettre d'Amour, grey filly, 1979 by Caro, grand-dam of Danehill Dancer
- Lady Lianga, grey filly, 1980 by Secretariat, failed to win in thirteen races
- Lacune, brown filly, 1981, by Seattle Slew, won two races, dam of Glen Jordan (Premio Chiusura)
- Le Mikado, bay colt, 1983, by Exclusive Native
- Lancret, brown colt, 1984, by Pleasant Colony, won three races
- Darling Misty, grey filly, 1985, by Alydar
- Légion d'honneur, chestnut filly, 1986, by Alydar, won two races
- Langeais, grey gelding, 1988, by Spend A Buck

== Assessment ==
There was no International Classification of European two-year-olds in 1973: the official handicappers of Britain, Ireland and France compiled separate rankings for horses which competed in those countries. In the French Free Handicap Lianga was rated the second best filly of the season, three pounds behind Hippodamia whom she had beaten in all three of their meetings. The independent Timeform organisation gave her a rating of 120, ten pounds inferior to their top-rated two-year-old filly Hippodamia.

In 1974, the French handicapper rated Lianga eighteen pounds inferior to the top-rated three-year-old Comtesse de Loir. Timeform gave her a rating of 116, fourteen pounds behind their best sprinter Saritamer and fifteen behind their best miler Nonoalco.

In 1975 Timeform gave the filly a rating of 133, making her the highest-rated older female of the year, but a pound inferior to their best sprinter Flirting Around and their best miler Bolkonski. The official French handicapper rated her the fourth-best older female behind Allez France, Dahlia and Comtesse de Loir. In the British handicap she was rated the best older female horse, three pounds ahead of Dahlia. In their annual Racehorses of 1975, Timeform praised her "toughness, consistency and versatility" and described her as "in every respect an exceptional filly".

== Pedigree ==
Pedigree of Lianga, grey mare, 1971
| Sire Dancer's Image (USA) 1965 | Native Dancer (USA); 1950 | Polynesian | Unbreakable |
| Sire Dancer's Image (USA) 1965 | Native Dancer (USA); 1950 | Polynesian | Black Polly |
| Sire Dancer's Image (USA) 1965 | Native Dancer (USA); 1950 | Geisha | Discovery |
| Sire Dancer's Image (USA) 1965 | Native Dancer (USA); 1950 | Geisha | Miyako |
| Sire Dancer's Image (USA) 1965 | Noors Image (USA); 1953 | Noor | Nasrullah |
| Sire Dancer's Image (USA) 1965 | Noors Image (USA); 1953 | Noor | Queen of Baghdad |
| Sire Dancer's Image (USA) 1965 | Noors Image (USA); 1953 | Little Sphinx | Challenger |
| Sire Dancer's Image (USA) 1965 | Noors Image (USA); 1953 | Little Sphinx | Khara |
| Dam Leven Ones (USA) 1961 | Sailor (USA); 1952 | Eight Thirty | Pilate |
| Dam Leven Ones (USA) 1961 | Sailor (USA); 1952 | Eight Thirty | Dinner Time |
| Dam Leven Ones (USA) 1961 | Sailor (USA); 1952 | Flota | Jack High |
| Dam Leven Ones (USA) 1961 | Sailor (USA); 1952 | Flota | Armada |
| Dam Leven Ones (USA) 1961 | Olympia Dell (USA); 1953 | Olympia | Heliopolis |
| Dam Leven Ones (USA) 1961 | Olympia Dell (USA); 1953 | Olympia | Miss Dolphin |
| Dam Leven Ones (USA) 1961 | Olympia Dell (USA); 1953 | Star Student | Rhodes Scholar |
| Dam Leven Ones (USA) 1961 | Olympia Dell (USA); 1953 | Star Student | Delmarie (Family 22-b) |
