= Pall Mall (horse) =

Irish-bred Thoroughbred racehorse

- Sire: Palestine
- Grandsire: Fair Trial
- Dam: Malapert
- Damsire: Portlaw
- Sex: Stallion
- Foaled: 1955
- Country: Ireland
- Colour: Chestnut
- Breeder: Queen Elizabeth II
- Owner: Queen Elizabeth II
- Trainer: Cecil Boyd-Rochfort
- Record: 14:7-4-1
- Earnings: £20,542

Major wins
- New Stakes (1957); Thirsk Classic Trial (1958); 2000 Guineas (1958); Lockinge Stakes (1958, 1959)

Awards
- Timeform rating 132

Pall Mall (1955–1978) was an Irish-bred, British-trained Thoroughbred racehorse and sire, best known for winning the classic 2000 Guineas in 1958. Owned and bred by Queen Elizabeth II, Pall Mall was one of the leading British two-year-olds of 1957, when he won the New Stakes at Royal Ascot and was placed in three other important races. In the following spring, he performed moderately in two trial races before creating a 20/1 upset by winning the 2000 Guineas. He later won the first two runnings of the Lockinge Stakes before being retired to stud, where he had some success as a sire of winners.

== Background ==
Pall Mall was a dark-coated chestnut horse with a white blaze and three white socks bred in Ireland by his owner, Queen Elizabeth II. The colt was sent into training with Cecil Boyd-Rochfort at his Freemason Lodge stable in Newmarket, Suffolk. Boyd-Rochfort trained the horses owned by British monarchs from 1943 until 1968.

Pall Mall was the only British classic winner sired by the 1950 2000 Guineas winner Palestine, the best of whose other progeny included Green Banner (Irish 2,000 Guineas) and Palariva (King's Stand Stakes). Pall Mall's dam, Malapert, showed no ability as a racehorse and was bought on behalf of King George VI for 100 guineas at the Newmarket sales in December 1949. A year before Pall Mall's birth, Malapert had produced Cheetah, a moderate racehorse but a good broodmare who became the grand-dam of the 1000 Guineas winner Caergwrle and the Wills Mile winner St Chad.

== Racing career ==
=== 1957:two-year-old season ===
Pall Mall's first racecourse appearance came in May 1957 when he won a maiden race at Haydock Park by five lengths. A month later, he was moved up in class to contest the New Stakes over five furlongs at Royal Ascot. Ridden by Harry Carr, he started at odds of 6/1 and won by a length from Troubadour and Will Somers. A month after his Ascot win, he finished second to the filly Abelia in the July Stakes at Newmarket and then ran third in the Gimcrack Stakes at York. He had been expected to win the latter race but was well beaten by Pheidippedes, a colt who had finished unplaced in the New Stakes. On his final appearance of the season, he was beaten a short head by Kelly in the Champagne Stakes at Doncaster. In the Free Handicap, a ranking of the best two-year-olds to race in Britain, Pall Mall was assigned 126 pounds, seven pounds below the top-rated Major Portion.

=== 1958:three-year-old season ===
In April 1958, Pall Mall began his three-year-old season by finishing fourth on soft ground behind Aggressor in the 2000 Guineas Trial at Kempton Park Racecourse, leading some observers to write him off as a sprinter with no classic prospects. Two weeks later, he won the Classic Trial Stakes at Thirsk by a length. In the 2000 Guineas, run over the Rowley Mile course at Newmarket on 30 April, Pall Mall started a 20/1 outsider in a field of fourteen runners. He was ridden by Doug Smith as Harry Carr had elected to ride the stable's other runner, Bald Eagle, who was made 7/4 favourite. Pall Mall took the lead a furlong and a half from the finish and won by half a length from Major Portion (ridden by Smith's older brother Eph), with Nagami three lengths further back in third. The win was a first classic for Boyd-Rochfort and a second for the Queen, who missed the race through illness.

Carr resumed his association with Pall Mall in the inaugural running of the Lockinge Stakes at Newbury Racecourse a month later. The Guineas winner was made the 4/6 favourite and won easily. At Goodwood in July met Major Portion again in the Sussex Stakes and was beaten a length in his final race of the year.

=== 1959:four-year-old season ===
As a four-year-old, Pall Mall won a second Lockinge Stakes, starting the 1/2 favourite and winning from the Scottish-trained three-year-old Rexequus (later to win that season's Cambridgeshire Handicap). At Royal Ascot, raced in handicap company for the only time, when he was assigned top weight of 133 pounds in the Royal Hunt Cup. He started 5/2 favourite and finished second of the twenty-three runners, beaten one and a half lengths by Faultless Speech, a four-year-old to whom he was conceding 20 pounds. At the Newmarket July meeting, Pall Mall won his last race by taking the Midsummer Stakes.

== Assessment ==
The independent Timeform organisation awarded Pall Mall a peak annual rating of 132. In their book A Century of Champions, based on a modified version of the Timeform system, John Randall and Tony Morris rated Pall Mall an "average" winner of the 2000 Guineas.

== Stud record ==
Pall Mall had some success as a breeding stallion. The best of his offspring was probably Reform, foaled in 1964, whose wins included the Champion Stakes, Queen Elizabeth II Stakes, St James's Palace Stakes and Sussex Stakes. He also sired Sallust, who won the Sussex Stakes and the Prix du Moulin in 1972. His daughter Boulevard has had some influence as a broodmare, being the female-line ancestor of Street Cry, Shamardal, and Neo Universe. Pall Mall died in 1978.

== Pedigree ==
Pedigree of Pall Mall (IRE), chestnut stallion, 1955
Sire Palestine (GB) 1947	Fair Trial (GB); 1932	Fairway	Phalaris
Sire Palestine (GB) 1947	Fair Trial (GB); 1932	Fairway	Scapa Flow
Sire Palestine (GB) 1947	Fair Trial (GB); 1932	Lady Juror	Son-in-Law
Sire Palestine (GB) 1947	Fair Trial (GB); 1932	Lady Juror	Lady Josephine
Sire Palestine (GB) 1947	Una (IRE); 1930	Tetratema	The Tetrarch
Sire Palestine (GB) 1947	Una (IRE); 1930	Tetratema	Scotch Gift
Sire Palestine (GB) 1947	Una (IRE); 1930	Uganda	Bridaine
Sire Palestine (GB) 1947	Una (IRE); 1930	Uganda	Hush
Dam Malapert (GB) 1946	Portlaw (IRE); 1928	Beresford	Friar Marcus
Dam Malapert (GB) 1946	Portlaw (IRE); 1928	Beresford	Bayberry
Dam Malapert (GB) 1946	Portlaw (IRE); 1928	Portree	Stefan the Great
Dam Malapert (GB) 1946	Portlaw (IRE); 1928	Portree	Saddlemark
Dam Malapert (GB) 1946	Malatesta (GB); 1937	Sansovino	Swynford
Dam Malapert (GB) 1946	Malatesta (GB); 1937	Sansovino	Gondolette
Dam Malapert (GB) 1946	Malatesta (GB); 1937	Tetranella	The Tetrarch
Dam Malapert (GB) 1946	Malatesta (GB); 1937	Tetranella	Bettyhill (Family 7-d)

- Pall Mall was inbred 4 × 4 to The Tetrarch, meaning that this stallion appears twice in the fourth generation of his pedigree.
