= Anngrove Stud =

Horse breeding stud in Mountmellick, Ireland

- Town/City: Mountmellick
- State: County Laois
- Country: Ireland
- Coordinates: 53.111°N 7.328°W
- Owner: Alistair Pim
- Area: 350 acres (1.4 km^{2})
- Produces: Horses

The Anngrove Stud is a horse breeding stud of approximately 350 acres established about 1970 near Mountmellick, County Laois, Ireland.

== Stud horses ==
2019

- Marcel is holding stud from 2019.
