= Michael Sobell =

British businessman and racehorse owner

Sir Michael Sobell (1 November 1892 – 1 September 1993) was a British businessman, a major philanthropist, and a prominent owner/breeder of thoroughbred racehorses.

== Family and childhood ==
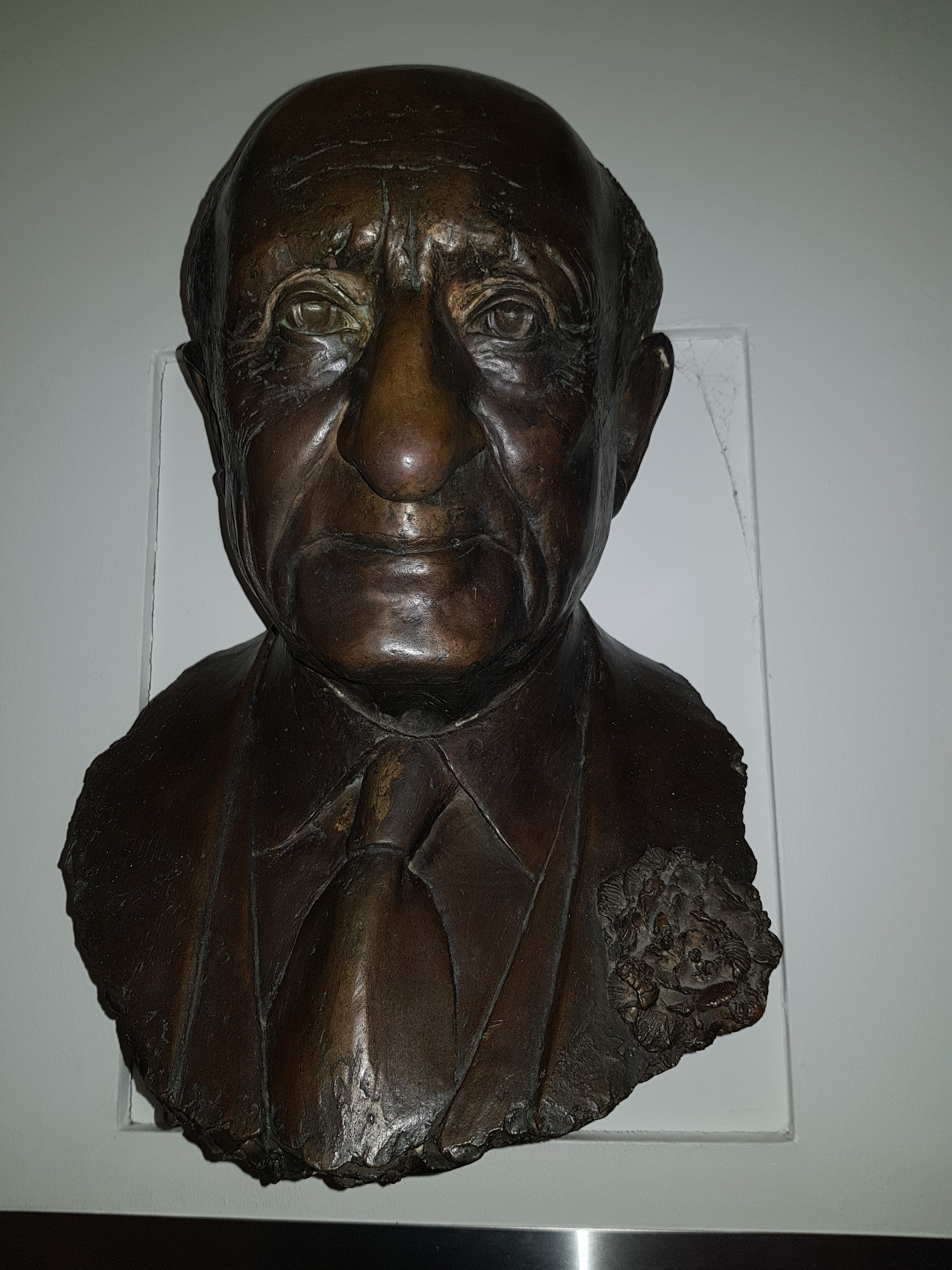
Bust of Sir Michael Sobell at Sobell Leisure Centre, Aberdare

Sobel (from 1946, Sobell) was born in Boryslav, Galicia, into a Jewish family; he was the only son of Lewis Sobel and his wife, Esther. His family owned factories in the Austro-Hungarian empire and oil interests at Limburg in Germany, but his parents moved to England in 1903 to escape antisemitism. The family settled in Dalston, east London, where Lewis Sobell set up as a confectioner. From 1903, Sobell attended the Central Foundation Boys' School on Cowper Street in Finsbury. He married his wife, Anne, in 1917.

== Business career ==
At the age of sixteen, with money provided by his father, he set up as an importer of fancy leather accessories. He and his father subsequently worked as leather goods manufacturers. Sobell made a fortune as a pioneer in electronics through his Radio & Allied Industries Ltd., a manufacturer of radio receivers that grew to become one of Britain's largest and most successful manufacturers of television sets. His daughter Netta married Arnold Weinstock who joined the company in 1954. In 1961, Sobell's company merged with The General Electric Company plc (GEC) making the family GEC's largest shareholder.

== Thoroughbred horse racing ==
An owner and breeder of thoroughbred racehorses, Michael Sobell's first major racing winner was London Cry in the 1958 Cambridgeshire Handicap. He hired Gordon Richards as his racing manager and in 1960, Sobell purchased Ballymacoll Stud, a breeding farm owned by Dorothy Paget in County Meath, Ireland. Among his racing stable's successes, Admetus won the 1974 Washington, D.C. International Stakes at Laurel Park Racecourse in Laurel, Maryland, at the time the most important international race in America. At home, Admetus won the Prince of Wales's Stakes and several races in France including the Grand Prix d'Évry and Prix Maurice de Nieuil.

In 1979, in partnership with his son-in-law Arnold Weinstock, Michael Sobell met with his greatest success with the champion colt Troy whose performances made him 1979's British flat racing Champion Owner. Among Troy's wins were England and Ireland's most prestigious races, the Epsom and Irish Derbys, as well as the Benson & Hedges Gold Cup, and the King George VI and Queen Elizabeth Stakes. In 1983, Sobell's filly Sun Princess won The Oaks and the St. Leger Stakes. Prince of Dance dead-heated for the 1988 Dewhurst Stakes.

After Gordon Richards retired, Sobell's horses were principally trained by Dick Hern at West Ilsley stables in Berkshire, which Sobell owned. In 1982 he sold the stables to Queen Elizabeth II and thereafter his English-based horses were trained by Ian Balding at Kingsclere and also by Barry Hills. His racing colours were pale blue with a yellow and white checked cap.

== Philanthropy ==
Sobell's business activities led him to become involved in educational and other institutions which advanced science and he served as chairman of the British Technion Committee. In addition, he used his great wealth to set up the Anne and Michael Sobell Trust in 1962 (renamed the Sobell Foundation in 1977) which provided financial support to a variety of benevolent causes including medical, educational, and fitness endeavours. His foundation supported and raised funds for facilities such as Sobell House Hospice, Michael Sobell Sinai School, Michael Sobell Hospice, the Brain Research Trust and the Michael Sobell Sports Centre at Finsbury Park, Islington. The Michael Sobell Leisure Centre in Aberdare, South Wales, also carries his name.

Michael Sobell was knighted in the 1972 New Year Honours becoming a Knight Bachelor. He died in 1993 aged 100. He bequeathed most of his fortune to his charitable foundation.
