= Hippodamia (horse) =

American-bred Thoroughbred racehorse

- Sire: Hail To Reason
- Grandsire: Turn-To
- Dam: White Lie
- Damsire: Bald Eagle
- Sex: Mare
- Foaled: 29 April 1971
- Country: USA
- Colour: Brown
- Breeder: Tom Gentry
- Owner: Nelson Bunker Hunt
- Trainer: Maurice Zilber
- Record: 20:4-7-1

Major wins
- Critérium des Pouliches (1973)

Awards
- Timeform rating 130 (1973), 116 (1974); Timeform top-rated two-year-filly (1973); Top-rated French two-year-filly (1973)

Hippodamia (29 April 1971 – after 1993) was a Kentucky-bred, French-trained Thoroughbred racehorse and broodmare. As a two-year-old she showed some promise racing over short distances, finishing third in the Prix Robert Papin, before establishing herself as the best juvenile filly in Europe with an emphatic six-length win in the Critérium des Pouliches. She failed to win in 1974, despite being placed in several important races and later won two races after being transferred to the United States. After her retirement from racing she had some success as a broodmare.

== Background ==
Hippodamia was a brown mare with no white markings bred in Kentucky by Tom Gentry. She was sired by Hail To Reason who was named American Champion Two-Year-Old Male Horse in 1960 before his racing career was ended by injury. He became a very successful breeding stallion, whose other progeny included Halo, Roberto, Bold Reason, Proud Clarion, Hail To All, Personality, Stop The Music and Trillion. Hippodamia's dam White Lie was of little use as a racehorse but came from a good family: her grand-dam Your Hostess was the ancestor of many important winners including Caracolero, Majestic Prince, Secreto, Daiwa Major and Real Quiet.

As a yearling, Hippodamia was offered for sale and bought for $42,000 by representatives of Nelson Bunker Hunt. The filly was sent to Europe where she was trained in France by Maurice Zilber.

== Racing career ==
=== 1973: two-year-old season ===
After finishing second over 900 metres on her racecourse debut, Hippodamia recorded her first success in a minor race over 1100 metres and then finished fifth in her next appearance. She was then moved up in class for the Group One Prix Robert Papin over 1100 metres at Maisons-Laffitte on 29 July. Ridden by the Australian Bill Pyers, she started a 17/1 outsider and finished third, beaten two lengths and a head by Lianga and Soyez Brave. Hippodamia was then sent to England to contest the Gimcrack Stakes at York Racecourse in August, but made little impression, finishing seventh behind Giacometti. The filly returned to France in September and was moved up in distance for the Prix des Chênes over 1600 metres at Longchamp Racecourse and finished second, four lengths behind the Aga Khan's colt Bayraan.

On 7 October at Longchamp, Hippodamia started 4.2/1 second favourite for the Group One Critérium des Pouliches over 1600 metres. The favourite was Insistance, runner-up to Nonoalco in the Prix Morny, whilst the other runners included Polygamy and three others from Britain, Cake (third in the Morny) from Ireland and the locally-trained Comtesse de Loir, winner of her only previous start. Pyers sent the filly into the lead early in the straight and Hippodamia drew away from her sixteen rivals to win by a record margin of six lengths from Comtesse de Loir, La Tulipe and Polygamy.

=== 1974: three-year-old season ===
On her three-year-old debut, Hippodamia finished second to Paddy's Princess in the Prix de la Grotte over 1600 metres at Longchamp in April. On 5 May she started 5/2 second favourite behind Lianga in the Poule d'Essai des Pouliches and finished second, beaten a length by the 30/1 outsider Dumka. Three weeks later she was moved up in distance to contest the Prix Saint-Alary over 2000 metres at Longchamp, and started at odds of 3.75/1 against thirteen opponents including Comtesse de Loir, Paddy's Princess, Dumka, Pale Ale (winner of the Prix Penelope) and Rose Bed (Prix Chloé). Hippodamia stayed on in the straight without ever looking likely to win and finished second, two and a half length behind the winner Comtesse de Loir. On her next appearance she started 11/2 third favourite for the Prix de Diane over 2100 metres at Chantilly Racecourse and finished fifth behind the British filly Highclere. The filly was then employed as a pacemaker for her stable companion Dahlia in the King George VI and Queen Elizabeth Stakes and the Benson and Hedges Gold Cup. Dahlia won both races, with Hippodamia unplaced. She then started joint-favourite for the Prix de l'Opéra at Longchamp on 6 October, but ran poorly, finishing unplaced behind Cheryl.

=== 1975: four-year-old season ===
In 1975, Hippodamia was campaigned in the United States where she won two minor races and finished second to Gull's Cry in the Grade III Columbiana Handicap at Hialeah Park.

== Assessment ==
There was no International Classification of European two-year-olds in 1973: the official handicappers of Britain, Ireland and France compiled separate rankings for horses which competed in those countries. In the French Free Handicap, Hippodamia was rated the best filly of her generation, three pounds ahead of Lianga and seven behind the leading colt Mississipian [sic]. The independent Timeform organisation gave her a rating of 130 and described her as "far and away the best staying filly of her age trained in Europe". In the following year she was given a rating of 116 by Timeform, fifteen pounds behind their top-rated three-year-old filly Comtesse de Loir. In the official French handicap she was rated fourteen pound behind Comtesse de Loir, who was the top-rated three-year-old of either sex.

== Breeding record ==
Hippodamia was retired from racing to become a broodmare in Kentucky. She produced at least eleven foals and five winners between 1976 and 1993. Her foals included:

- Synclinal, a brown filly, foaled in 1976, sired by Vaguely Noble. Unraced.
- Globe, brown colt, 1977, by Secretariat. Won six races including the Excelsior Handicap and Grey Lag Handicap.
- Balance, bay filly, 1979, by Youth. Won two races, second in the Prix Imprudence
- Vaguely Essence, chestnut filly, 1981, by Vaguely Noble. Unraced.
- Petela, bay filly, 1983 by Big Spruce. Unraced.
- Foamflower, grey filly, 1984, by Grey Dawn. Won two races.
- Hippo, brown colt, 1986, by Riverman. Failed to win in fourteen races.
- Housatonic, brown filly, 1987, by Riverman. Won one race.
- Hoya, bay filly, 1989, by Secreto. Won four races including the Listed Prix Charles Laffitte.
- Hiawathas Song, chestnut filly, 1990, by Chief's Crown. Unraced.
- Hymenee, brown filly, 1993, by Chief's Crown. Failed to win in three races.

== Pedigree ==
Pedigree of Hippodamia, bay mare, 1971
Sire Hail To Reason (USA) 1958	Turn-to (USA); 1951	Royal Charger	Nearco
Sire Hail To Reason (USA) 1958	Turn-to (USA); 1951	Royal Charger	Sun Princess
Sire Hail To Reason (USA) 1958	Turn-to (USA); 1951	Source Sucree	Admiral Drake
Sire Hail To Reason (USA) 1958	Turn-to (USA); 1951	Source Sucree	Lavendula
Sire Hail To Reason (USA) 1958	Nothirdchance (USA); 1948	Blue Swords	Blue Larkspur
Sire Hail To Reason (USA) 1958	Nothirdchance (USA); 1948	Blue Swords	Flaming Swords
Sire Hail To Reason (USA) 1958	Nothirdchance (USA); 1948	Galla Colors	Sir Gallahad III
Sire Hail To Reason (USA) 1958	Nothirdchance (USA); 1948	Galla Colors	Rouge et Noir
Dam White Lie (USA) 1964	Bald Eagle (USA); 1955	Nasrullah	Nearco
Dam White Lie (USA) 1964	Bald Eagle (USA); 1955	Nasrullah	Mumtaz Begum
Dam White Lie (USA) 1964	Bald Eagle (USA); 1955	Siama	Tiger
Dam White Lie (USA) 1964	Bald Eagle (USA); 1955	Siama	China Face
Dam White Lie (USA) 1964	Etiquette (USA); 1954	Bernborough	Emborough
Dam White Lie (USA) 1964	Etiquette (USA); 1954	Bernborough	Bern Maid
Dam White Lie (USA) 1964	Etiquette (USA); 1954	Your Hostess	Alibhai
Dam White Lie (USA) 1964	Etiquette (USA); 1954	Your Hostess	Boudoir (Family 4-d)
