= Saritamer =

American-bred Thoroughbred racehorse (b. 1971)

- Sire: Dancer's Image
- Grandsire: Native Dancer
- Dam: Irish Chorus
- Damsire: Ossian
- Sex: Stallion
- Foaled: 1971
- Country: USA
- Colour: Grey
- Breeder: Mrs. Bruce M. Donaldson
- Owner: Charles St George
- Trainer: Vincent O'Brien
- Record: 14:8-0-3
- Earnings: £27,050

Major wins
- Anglesey Stakes (1973); Beresford Stakes (1973); Greenlands Stakes (1974); Cork and Orrery Stakes (1974); July Cup (1974); Diadem Stakes (1974)

Awards
- Timeform rating 115 (1973), 130 (1974); Timeform Best Sprinter (1974)
- Last updated on 11 March 2025

Saritamer (1971 – after 1981) was a Kentucky-bred, Irish-trained Thoroughbred racehorse and sire. As a two-year-old he was rated the third-best two-year-old in Ireland after winning the Anglesey Stakes and the Beresford Stakes. In the following year he became a specialised sprinter, excelling over six furlongs and winning the Greenlands Stakes, Cork and Orrery Stakes, July Cup and Diadem Stakes. He was named best sprinter of 1974 by Timeform. He later sired the middle-distance champion Time Charter but was otherwise unsuccessful at stud.

== Background ==
Saritamer was a "strong, compact" grey horse bred in Kentucky by Mrs Bruce M. Donaldson. He was one of the best horses sired by Dancer's Image who won the 1968 Kentucky Derby but was disqualified after traces of phenylbutazone were discovered in a post-race urinalysis. As a breeding stallion, he stood in Europe and Japan, siring several other good winners including the multiple Group One winner Lianga and the King's Stand Stakes winner Godswalk. Saritamer's dam Irish Chorus was a successful racehorse in Ireland, winning the Phoenix Stakes in 1962. As a descendant of the broodmare, Duke's Delight, Irish Chorus was related to several major winners including Noblesse, Pistol Packer, Rainbow Quest and Commander in Chief.

As a yearling, the colt was offered for sale and bought for $50,000 by representatives of Charles St George. Saritamer was sent to Ireland to be trained by Vincent O'Brien at Ballydoyle, County Tipperary.

== Racing career ==
=== 1973: two-year-old season ===
After finishing third over five furlongs on his racecourse debut, Saritamer won a race over six furlongs and then started odds-on favourite for the Group Three Curragh Stakes in which he finished third behind the filly Noble Mark. Following a win in a minor event over six furlongs, the colt was moved back up in class for the Anglesey Stakes at the Curragh in early September. Ridden by Lester Piggott, he started joint-favourite and won by three lengths from the Dermot Weld-trained Red Alert (later to win the Jersey Stakes and the Stewards' Cup) after going clear of his rivals approaching the final furlong. Saritamer was then moved up in distance and started 1/3 favourite for the Group Two Beresford Stakes at the Curragh. He was ridden with great confidence and, although he prevailed by only a short head from the filly Leave It To Me, appeared to have plenty in reserve and to be better than the bare form suggested. For his last race as a juvenile, Saritamer was sent to England to contest the Group One Middle Park Stakes at Newmarket Racecourse, in which he finished fourth behind Habat, Pitcairn and Boots Green, beaten seven lengths by the winner.

=== 1974: three-year-old season ===
Saritamer had been withdrawn from his engagements in the British and Irish classics at the end of his two-year-old season and in 1974 was campaigned exclusively in sprint races. Unlike many leading sprinters he did not show explosive early pace, instead relying on class, finishing speed and the assistance of Piggott to record his biggest wins. He made a successful seasonal debut in the Group Three Greenlands Stakes over six furlongs at the Curragh in May, but then looked outpaced when finishing fourth behind Sarasota Star in the five furlong Handy Cut Stakes at Leopardstown.

In June, Saritamer was sent to England for a second time for the Cork and Orrery Stakes (then a Group Three race) at Royal Ascot and started at odds on 11/1 against sixteen opponents. Piggott restrained the colt in the early stages before producing him with a late run on the outside. Saritamer took the lead inside the final furlong and won going away by three-quarters of a length from Blessed Rock (to whom he was conceding four pounds) with Nevermore in third. The unplaced horses included Sarasota Star and the ex-Italian colt New Model. Saritamer's next race was the July Cup (then a Group Two race) over six furlongs at Newmarket. Starting at odds of 11/4 he was given a "brilliantly forceful" ride from Piggott to hold off the late challenge of New Model to win by a short head. The colt was then dropped back in distance for the Nunthorpe Stakes over five furlongs at York Racecourse in August. He started poorly and was outpaced in the early stages before making progress and finishing third behind the four-year-olds Blue Cashmere and Rapid River.

In September, Saritamer was made the 11/10 favourite for the Diadem Stakes at Ascot in which he again faced New Model as well as the four-year-old gelding Boldboy who had on the race in 1973. He won by half a length from New Model, with Piggott easing him down in the closing stages. Three weeks later, the colt contested the Challenge Stakes over six furlongs at Newmarket but started poorly and was never in contention, finishing eighth of the ten runners behind New Model. Plans to run the colt in the Vernons Gold Cup were abandoned and he was retired from racing.

== Assessment ==
There was no International Classification of European two-year-olds in 1973: the official handicappers of Britain, Ireland and France compiled separate rankings for horses which competed in those countries. In the Irish Free Handicap, Saritamer was rated the third-best two-year-old colt of the season, eleven pounds behind Apalachee and six behind the Dewhurst Stakes winner Cellini. The independent Timeform organisation were less impressed, giving him a rating of 115, twenty-two pounds behind Apalachee and ten behind Cellini. In their annual Racehorses of 1973, Timeform described him as a horse who stayed a mile and "should do well in second-class company". In 1974, Saritamer was given a rating of 130 by Timeform, who named him their best sprinter of the year, one pound ahead of New Model. In their annual Racehorses of 1974, they described him as "genuine and consistent" but pointed out that the sprinting division was a rather weak one. In the British handicap for three-year-olds he was rated the firth best colt of 1974 behind Take A Reef, Bustino, Nonoalco and Snow Knight.

== Stud record ==
In December 1974, a half-share in Saritamer was sold for £150,000 to an Arabian syndicate. He began his career as a breeding stallion at the Wyld Court Stud in Berkshire at a fee of £1,500. For the most part, Saritamer's stud record was disappointing; Timeform described it as "abysmal"' while the Racing Post called him a "poisoner of pedigrees". He did, however, sire one outstanding performer in Time Charter, a mare whose wins included The Oaks, Sun Chariot Stakes, Champion Stakes, King George VI and Queen Elizabeth Stakes, Prix Foy and Coronation Cup. In 1981 he was sent to stand in Saudi Arabia.

== Pedigree ==
Pedigree of Saritamer, grey stallion, 1971
Sire Dancer's Image (USA) 1965	Native Dancer (USA); 1950	Polynesian	Unbreakable
Sire Dancer's Image (USA) 1965	Native Dancer (USA); 1950	Polynesian	Black Polly
Sire Dancer's Image (USA) 1965	Native Dancer (USA); 1950	Geisha	Discovery
Sire Dancer's Image (USA) 1965	Native Dancer (USA); 1950	Geisha	Miyako
Sire Dancer's Image (USA) 1965	Noors Image (USA); 1953	Noor	Nasrullah
Sire Dancer's Image (USA) 1965	Noors Image (USA); 1953	Noor	Queen of Baghdad
Sire Dancer's Image (USA) 1965	Noors Image (USA); 1953	Little Sphinx	Challenger
Sire Dancer's Image (USA) 1965	Noors Image (USA); 1953	Little Sphinx	Khara
Dam Irish Chorus (IRE) 1960	Ossian (GB); 1952	Royal Charger	Nearco
Dam Irish Chorus (IRE) 1960	Ossian (GB); 1952	Royal Charger	Sun Princess
Dam Irish Chorus (IRE) 1960	Ossian (GB); 1952	Prudent Polly	Atout Maitre
Dam Irish Chorus (IRE) 1960	Ossian (GB); 1952	Prudent Polly	Sister Anne
Dam Irish Chorus (IRE) 1960	Dawn Chorus (GB); 1951	Rising Light	Hyperion
Dam Irish Chorus (IRE) 1960	Dawn Chorus (GB); 1951	Rising Light	Bread Card
Dam Irish Chorus (IRE) 1960	Dawn Chorus (GB); 1951	Duke's Delight	His Grace
Dam Irish Chorus (IRE) 1960	Dawn Chorus (GB); 1951	Duke's Delight	Early Light (Family 14-f)
