= Palestine (horse) =

British-bred Thoroughbred racehorse

- Sire: Fair Trial
- Grandsire: Fairway
- Dam: Una
- Damsire: Tetratema
- Sex: Stallion
- Foaled: 1947
- Country: Great Britain
- Colour: Grey
- Breeder: Aga Khan III
- Owner: Aga Khan III
- Trainer: Marcus Marsh
- Record: 13: 11-1-0
- Earnings: £38,515

Major wins
- Coventry Stakes (1949); Richmond Stakes (1949); Gimcrack Stakes (1949); Champagne Stakes (1949); 2000 Guineas (1950); St. James's Palace Stakes (1950); Sussex Stakes (1950)

Awards
- Champion Irish Sire of Two Year Olds (1964)
- Last updated on 23 October 2011

Palestine (1947–1974) was a British Thoroughbred racehorse and Stallion. He was owned and bred by Aga Khan III.

He was sired by Fair Trial out of the mare Una.

During his racing career, he competed in 13 races and won 11, including the 2,000 Guineas. After retirement, he became a stallion and was named Ireland's leading sire in 1964.

== Career ==
External Video Link
- 1950 2,000 Guineas; Race Footage Video from the Official British Pathé YouTube Channel

Palestine was trained by Marcus Marsh and ridden by Charlie Smirke. As a 2-year-old in 1949, he won the Coventry Stakes, Richmond Stakes, Gimcrack Stakes, and Champagne Stakes.

In 1950, at age three, he won the 2000 Guineas Stakes, becoming a classic winner; it was known that Palestine and Prince Simon were the strongest horses competing that day. They both ran toward the front of the pack, rushing for first place with all their strength upon entering the final spurt. They momentarily ran unchallenged, approximately 3 lengths ahead of the rest of the competitors. This resulted in a photo finish: in the end, Palestine was declared the victor.

He subsequently won the St James's Palace Stakes and the Sussex Stakes.

== Stud Record and Death ==
Palestine retired to stud in 1951. In 1964, he was the leading sire of two-year-olds in Ireland.

His son Pakistan II, (1958-1972), was the champion stallion sire in New Zealand in the 1969-70, 1971-72, 1972-73 and 1974-75 seasons.

Some of his other notable progeny includes:

Foaled	Name	Sex	Dam	Major Wins
1955	Pall Mall (IRE)	c	Malapert (GB)	1958 2000 Guineas
1956	Palariva (GB)	f	Rivaz (GB)	1956 King's Stand Stakes
1959	Escort (GB)	c	Warning (GB)	1961 Royal Lodge Stakes
1959	Areopolis	c	Alona (GB)	1962 Arkansas Derby
1960	Red Tears	g	Huntress (GB)	1964 Rosebery Handicap
1961	Palinda (GB)	f	Clarinda (GB)	
1966	Flying Legs (GB)	f	Alona (GB)	1968 Lowther Stakes

c = colt, f = filly, g = gelding

Palestine was put down due to old age on July 10, 1974.

== Pedigree ==
Phalaris, as a descendant of Polymelus, was related to both Northern Dancer and Secretariat.

Pedigree of Palestine
Sire Fair Trial (GB) 1932	Fairway; 1925	Phalaris	Polymelus
Sire Fair Trial (GB) 1932	Fairway; 1925	Phalaris	Bromus
Sire Fair Trial (GB) 1932	Fairway; 1925	Scapa Flow	Chaucer
Sire Fair Trial (GB) 1932	Fairway; 1925	Scapa Flow	Anchora
Sire Fair Trial (GB) 1932	Lady Juror; 1919	Son-In-Law	Dark Ronald
Sire Fair Trial (GB) 1932	Lady Juror; 1919	Son-In-Law	Mother-In-Law
Sire Fair Trial (GB) 1932	Lady Juror; 1919	Lady Josephine	Sundridge
Sire Fair Trial (GB) 1932	Lady Juror; 1919	Lady Josephine	Americus Girl
Dam Una (IRE) 1930	Tetratema; 1917	The Tetrarch	Roi Herode
Dam Una (IRE) 1930	Tetratema; 1917	The Tetrarch	Vahren
Dam Una (IRE) 1930	Tetratema; 1917	Scotch Gift	Symington
Dam Una (IRE) 1930	Tetratema; 1917	Scotch Gift	Maund
Dam Una (IRE) 1930	Uganda (FR); 1921	Bridaine	Gorgos
Dam Una (IRE) 1930	Uganda (FR); 1921	Bridaine	Bitter Orange
Dam Una (IRE) 1930	Uganda (FR); 1921	Hush	St. Serf
Dam Una (IRE) 1930	Uganda (FR); 1921	Hush	Silent Lady
