= Highclere (horse) =

British-bred Thoroughbred racehorse (1971–1992)

- Sire: Queen's Hussar
- Grandsire: March Past
- Dam: Highlight
- Damsire: Borealis
- Sex: Mare
- Foaled: 1971
- Country: United Kingdom
- Colour: Bay
- Breeder: Queen Elizabeth II
- Owner: Queen Elizabeth II
- Trainer: Dick Hern
- Record: 8: 3-3-0

Major wins
- 1000 Guineas (1974); Prix de Diane (1974)

Honours
- Timeform rating: 129
- Last updated on 25 August 2023

Highclere (1971–1992) was a British thoroughbred racehorse and broodmare owned by Queen Elizabeth II. In a racing career lasting from summer 1973 until October 1974, she ran eight times and won three races. Highclere won one minor race as a two-year-old but improved to win the 1000 Guineas at Newmarket Racecourse and Prix de Diane at Chantilly. She later finished second to Dahlia in the King George VI and Queen Elizabeth Stakes at Ascot. She retired at the end of the season to become a highly successful and influential broodmare.

== Background ==
Highclere was a bay filly, bred in England by her owner, Queen Elizabeth II. She was sired by the Sussex Stakes winner Queen's Hussar, whose reputation as a stallion had previously rested almost entirely on the fact that he was the sire of Brigadier Gerard. Her dam Highlight won two minor races and was a daughter of Hypericum, who won the 1000 Guineas for King George VI in 1946. As a descendant of the broodmare Feola, Highclere came from the same branch of Thoroughbred family 2-f which produced Round Table, Pebbles and Aureole.

The filly was named after Highclere Castle, the home of the Queen's racing manager, Lord Carnarnvon. Highclere was sent into training with Dick Hern at his stables in West Ilsley in Berkshire. Her regular jockey was Joe Mercer.

== Racing career ==
=== 1973: two-year-old season ===
Highclere ran three times as a two-year-old in 1973. After finishing second in a maiden race at Newmarket behind Polygamy, she was moved up in class for the Princess Margaret Stakes at Ascot Racecourse, and finished second again, though this time beating Polygamy. On her final start, she won the Donnington Stakes at Newbury, but was not particularly impressive. At the end of the season she was allotted a weight of 109 pounds in the Free Handicap, a rating of the best two-year-olds to have raced in Britain. The rating placed her twenty-two pounds below the top-rated Apalachee, and nine pounds below Bitty Girl, Gentle Thoughts and Melchbourne who tied for the position of best filly.

=== 1974: three-year-old season ===
On Highclere's first appearance of 1974 she contested the Classic 1000 Guineas over the Rowley Mile at Newmarket. Wearing blinkers for the first time she started at odds of 12/1 in a field of fifteen fillies. The closing stages of the race saw a struggle between Highclere and the Peter Walwyn-trained favourite Polygamy. with the Queen's filly prevailing by a short head. The win gave the British monarch her second fillies' Classic win, seventeen years after Carrozza won The Oaks. It was believed that the course and distance of the Oaks would not suit Highclere, and so the filly was rerouted to the French equivalent, the Prix de Diane over 2100m at Chantilly. With her owner in attendance, Highclere won by two lengths from Comtesse de Loir. On their return from France Dick Hern and Joe Mercer were invited to dine with the Royal Family at Windsor Castle.

In July, Highclere raced against colts and older horses in Britain's most prestigious all-aged race, the King George VI and Queen Elizabeth Diamond Stakes at Ascot. Highclere finished second, beaten two lengths by the French four-year-old filly Dahlia, who was winning the race for the second year. Highclere failed to reproduce her best form in her two remaining races. She finished unplaced behind Dahlia in the Benson and Hedges Gold Cup and was also unplaced in the Prix de l'Arc de Triomphe. Highclere was then retired to stud.

== Retirement ==
Highclere produced several winners, the best of whom were the colt Milford and the filly Height of Fashion, both of whom won the Princess of Wales's Stakes. Height of Fashion went on to produce the 2000 Guineas and Epsom Derby winner Nashwan as well as the multiple Group winners Nayef and Unfuwain. Another of Highclere's daughters, Burghclere, produced Wind In Her Hair, the dam of Deep Impact. Highclere died in 1992.

Her named foals include:

- 1976/04/29 =Milford (GB), ch colt by Mill Reef – 3 wins from 8 starts, including Princess of Wales's Stakes
- 1977/04/26 =Burghclere (GB), b filly by =Busted (GB) – 1 win from 6 starts. Dam of Wind in Her Hair, who in turn is the dam of Black Tide and Deep Impact. Third dam of Rey de Oro, also through Wind in Her Hair.
- 1978/04/30 =Beacon Hill (GB), ch filly by =Bustino (GB) – winless in 3 starts.
- 1979/04/14 Height of Fashion (FR), b filly by =Bustino (GB) – champion, multiple stakes winner. dam of Nashwan, Nayef and Unfuwain. second dam of Ghanaati
- 1982/04/14 =Bright Sun (GB), b filly by Mill Reef – unraced
- 1985/04/14 Highbrow (GB), bay filly, by Shirley Heights (GB) - 1 win and 6 placings, including 2nd Ribblesdale Stakes. Dam of multiple winners. second dam of Ask
- 1987/04/11 Marienski (USA), b colt by Nureyev – 1 win from 8 starts
- 1988/05/10 Wily Trick (USA), b filly by Clever Trick 1976 – winless in 5 starts. dam of Elegant Fashion (Hong Kong Derby)
- 1989/04/29 Hierarch (USA), ch colt by Diesis (GB) – 2 wins from 22 starts in Europe and America
- 1990/05/09 Scarlet Tunic (USA), dk b/ colt by Blushing Groom (FR) – 1 win from 10 starts
- 1992/02/02 Clear Attraction (USA), bay filly by Lear Fan (USA) – unplaced in 1 start

The family is still producing stakes winners around the world. For example, Talismanic, winner of the 2017 Breeders' Cup Turf, descends from Highclere through Burghclere.

== Assessment and honours ==
Highclere was given a rating of 129 by Timeform.

In their book, A Century of Champions, based on the Timeform rating system, John Randall and Tony Morris rated Highclere a "superior" winner of the 1000 Guineas and the forty-sixth best filly or mare trained in Britain or Ireland in the 20th century.

== Pedigree ==
Pedigree of Highclere (GB), bay mare, 1971
| Sire Queen's Hussar (GB) 1960 | March Past; 1950 | Petition | Fair Trial |
| Sire Queen's Hussar (GB) 1960 | March Past; 1950 | Petition | Art Paper |
| Sire Queen's Hussar (GB) 1960 | March Past; 1950 | Marcelette | William of Valence |
| Sire Queen's Hussar (GB) 1960 | March Past; 1950 | Marcelette | Permavon |
| Sire Queen's Hussar (GB) 1960 | Jojo; 1950 | Vilmorin | Gold Bridge |
| Sire Queen's Hussar (GB) 1960 | Jojo; 1950 | Vilmorin | Queen of the Meadows |
| Sire Queen's Hussar (GB) 1960 | Jojo; 1950 | Fairy Jane | Fair Trial |
| Sire Queen's Hussar (GB) 1960 | Jojo; 1950 | Fairy Jane | Light Tackle |
| Dam Highlight (GB) 1958 | Borealis; 1941 | Brumeux | Teddy |
| Dam Highlight (GB) 1958 | Borealis; 1941 | Brumeux | La Brume |
| Dam Highlight (GB) 1958 | Borealis; 1941 | Aurora | Hyperion |
| Dam Highlight (GB) 1958 | Borealis; 1941 | Aurora | Rose Red |
| Dam Highlight (GB) 1958 | Hypericum; 1943 | Hyperion | Gainsborough |
| Dam Highlight (GB) 1958 | Hypericum; 1943 | Hyperion | Selene |
| Dam Highlight (GB) 1958 | Hypericum; 1943 | Feola | Friar Marcus |
| Dam Highlight (GB) 1958 | Hypericum; 1943 | Feola | Aloe (Family 2-f) |

Highclere was inbred 3x4 to Hyperion, meaning that the stallion appears in both the third and fourth generations of her pedigree. She was also inbred 4x4 to Fair Trial.
