= Fair Trial =

British-bred Thoroughbred racehorse

- Sire: Fairway
- Grandsire: Phalaris
- Dam: Lady Juror
- Damsire: Son-in-Law
- Sex: Stallion
- Foaled: 1932
- Died: 1958 (aged 25–26)
- Country: Great Britain
- Colour: Chestnut
- Breeder: John Arthur Dewar
- Owner: John Arthur Dewar
- Trainer: Fred Darling
- Record: 9: 7-1-1
- Earnings: £5,100

Major wins
- Longleat Stakes (1935); Queen Anne Stakes (1935); Select Stakes (1935); Ormonde Plate (1935); Newmarket Spring Plate (1936); Rous Memorial Stakes (1936); Lingfield Park Plate (1936)

Awards
- Leading sire in Great Britain and Ireland (1950); Leading broodmare sire in Great Britain & Ireland (1951)
- Last updated on May 7, 2010

Fair Trial (1932–1958) was a British Thoroughbred racehorse and champion sire. He was bred and raced by John Arthur Dewar, who also bred and raced Tudor Minstrel, rated one of the greatest racehorses of the 20th century.

The leading sire in Great Britain and Ireland in 1950, during his career Fair Trial sired 201 race winners, including Classic winners Lambert Simnel, Court Martial, Festoon, and Palestine. Through his daughters, Fair Trial was the 1951 leading broodmare sire in Great Britain and Ireland.
