= Lumiere (horse) =

British-bred Thoroughbred racehorse

- Racing silks of Hamdan bin Mohammed Al Maktoum
- Sire: Shamardal
- Grandsire: Giant's Causeway
- Dam: Screen Star
- Damsire: Tobougg
- Sex: Mare
- Foaled: 10 March 2013
- Country: United Kingdom
- Colour: Grey
- Breeder: Darley Stud
- Owner: Hamdan bin Mohammed Al Maktoum
- Trainer: Mark Johnston
- Record: 8: 3-2-1
- Earnings: £225,712

Major wins
- Cheveley Park Stakes (2015); Sir Henry Cecil Stakes (2016)

Lumiere (foaled 10 March 2013) is a British Thoroughbred racehorse. She was one of the best British two-year-old fillies of 2015 when she ran second in the Lowther Stakes before winning the Cheveley Park Stakes. Her only win in the following year came in the Sir Henry Cecil Stakes but she was placed in both the Sceptre Stakes and the Challenge Stakes.

== Background ==
Lumiere is a grey mare bred in England by Sheikh Mohammed's Darley Stud. She was from the seventh crop of foals sired by Shamardal whose wins included the Dewhurst Stakes, Poule d'Essai des Poulains, Prix du Jockey Club and St James's Palace Stakes. His other offspring have included Able Friend, Mukhadram, Lope de Vega and Casamento. Lumiere's dam Screen Star won on her only racecourse appearance, a contest for two-year-old at Redcar Racecourse in 2007. She was a great-granddaughter of Outstandingly the American Champion Two-Year-Old Filly of 1984.

During her racing career, the filly was owned by Sheikh Mohammed's son Hamdan bin Mohammed Al Maktoum and trained by Mark Johnston at Middleham in North Yorkshire.

== Racing career ==
=== 2015: two-year-old season ===
Lumiere was ridden in all of her 2015 races by William Buick. She made her racecourse debut in a maiden race over six furlongs at Newmarket Racecourse on 9 July and started the 6/5 favourite against seven opponents. She led from the start, accelerated away from the field approaching the final furlong and won impressively by six lengths from Sharja Queen. The filly was then moved up sharply in class for the Group 2 Lowther Stakes at York Racecourse on 20 August and started the 9/4 favourite ahead of the Princess Margaret Stakes winner Besharah. She took the lead soon after the start but was overtaken by Besharah inside the final furlong and was beaten two and a quarter lengths into second place.

On her third and final appearance as a juvenile, Lumiere was one of eight fillies to contest the Group One Cheveley Park Stakes over six furlongs at Newmarket on 26 September and started the 100/30 third choice in the betting behind Besharah and the Duchess of Cambridge Stakes winner Illuminate. A two-horse Irish challenge comprised Alice Springs (third to Minding in the Moyglare Stud Stakes) and the Curragh Stakes winner Bear Cheek. Lumiere took the lead from the start and opened up a clear advantage at half way. She was strongly challenged in the closing stages but stayed on to win by half a length, a head and three quarters of a length from Illuminate, Besharah and Alice Springs. After the race Johnston said "We always thought there was no shortage of stamina but we also know she's very fast and has a tremendous cruising speed. I'm very, very hopeful she can stay a mile".

=== 2016: three-year-old season ===
Lumiere began her second season in the 1000 Guineas at Newmarket on 1 May and started the second favourite in a sixteen-runner field. After starting strongly and disputing the early lead she dropped away quickly in the last three furlongs and finished last behind Minding. After a two-month break the filly was dropped in class for her return in the Listed Sir Henry Cecil Stakes at Newmarket on 7 July. Ridden as in the Guineas by Joe Fanning she started 3/1 favourite and posted a decisive win as she took the lead approaching the last quarter mile and drew away to win "comfortably" by six lengths from the colt Cymric. Later that month she was sent to France for the Group 1 Prix Rothschild over 1600 metres at Deauville Racecourse in which she briefly held the lead 500 metres out before fading to finish ninth behind Qemah.

James Doyle partnered Lumiere in her last two races. She was dropped in distance for the Group 3 Sceptre Stakes over seven furlongs at Doncaster Racecourse on 9 September and finished third to Spangled and Mise En Rose after leading inside the final furlong. I the Challenge Stakes on 7 October over the same distance at Newmarket she led for most of the way before being overtaken in the closing stages and beaten a length by the colt Aclaim.

== Pedigree ==
Pedigree of Lumiere (GB), grey filly, 2013
Sire Shamardal (USA) 2002	Giant's Causeway (USA); 1997	Storm Cat	Storm Bird
Sire Shamardal (USA) 2002	Giant's Causeway (USA); 1997	Storm Cat	Terlingua
Sire Shamardal (USA) 2002	Giant's Causeway (USA); 1997	Mariah's Storm	Rahy
Sire Shamardal (USA) 2002	Giant's Causeway (USA); 1997	Mariah's Storm	Immense
Sire Shamardal (USA) 2002	Helsinki (GB); 1993	Machiavellian	Mr. Prospector
Sire Shamardal (USA) 2002	Helsinki (GB); 1993	Machiavellian	Coup de Folie
Sire Shamardal (USA) 2002	Helsinki (GB); 1993	Helen Street	Troy
Sire Shamardal (USA) 2002	Helsinki (GB); 1993	Helen Street	Waterway
Dam Screen Star (IRE) 2005	Tobougg (IRE); 1998	Barathea	Sadler's Wells
Dam Screen Star (IRE) 2005	Tobougg (IRE); 1998	Barathea	Brocade
Dam Screen Star (IRE) 2005	Tobougg (IRE); 1998	Lacovia	Majestic Light
Dam Screen Star (IRE) 2005	Tobougg (IRE); 1998	Lacovia	Hope For All
Dam Screen Star (IRE) 2005	Actoris (USA); 1994	Diesis	Sharpen Up
Dam Screen Star (IRE) 2005	Actoris (USA); 1994	Diesis	Doubly Sure
Dam Screen Star (IRE) 2005	Actoris (USA); 1994	Avice Caro	Caro
Dam Screen Star (IRE) 2005	Actoris (USA); 1994	Avice Caro	Outstandingly (Family 1-x)
