= Alson (horse) =

German-bred racehorse

- Racing silks of Gestut Schlenderhan; Mme Corinna Baronin Von Ullmann
- Sire: Areion
- Grandsire: Big Shuffle
- Dam: Assisi
- Damsire: Galileo
- Sex: Stallion
- Foaled: 13 February 2017
- Country: Germany
- Colour: Bay
- Breeder: Gestut Schlenderhan
- Owner: Gestut Schlenderhan; Corinna Baronin Von Ullmann
- Trainer: Jean-Pierre Carvalho; André Fabre
- Record: 10: 5-2-1
- Earnings: £320,834

Major wins
- Zukunfts-Rennen (2019); Critérium International (2019); Prix Matchem (2020)

Alson (foaled 13 February 2017) is a German-bred Thoroughbred racehorse. He was one of the best German juveniles of 2019 when he won four of his six races including the Group 3 Zukunfts-Rennen and the Group 1 Critérium International as well as finishing second in the Prix Jean-Luc Lagardère. In the following year he ran second in the Poule d'Essai des Poulains and won the Prix Matchem.

== Background ==
Alson is a bay stallion with a prominent white star and snip and white socks on his hind legs bred in Germany by his owners Gestut Schlenderhan. He was sent into training with Jean-Pierre Carvalho in Germany.

He was sired by Areion, a high-class German sprinter who won the Goldene Peitsche and two editions of the Holsten-Trophy. He went on to have a successful stud career in Germany, siring many good winners including Vanjura (Premio Ribot), Wonnemond (Topkapi Trophy), Palace Prince (Badener Meile) and Le Roi (Queen Elizabeth Stakes (VRC).

Alson's dam Assisi won two races in Germany and produced the Mehl-Mülhens-Rennen winner Ancient Spirit. Assisi's dam Amarette won the Preis der Diana and came from a family which had produced numerous major winners in Germany as well as the Melbourne Cup winner Almandin.

== Racing career ==
=== 2019: two-year-old season ===
Alson made his debut in a minor race over 1200 metres at Munich Racecourse on 10 June when he was ridden by Jeremy Moisan, started the 9/10 favourite, and won by one and a half lengths from the filly Nona. Three weeks later he was sent to France for the Prix de Caen over the same distance at Deauville Racecourse and finished fourth of the five runners, beaten five and three quarter lengths by the winner Earthlight. The colt was then stepped up in distance for the Prix d'Auberville on 9 August over 1400 metres at Clairefontaine Racecourse in which he started the 13/1 outsider in a three-runner field. Ridden by Maxime Guyon he settled in third before taking the lead 300 metres from the finish and stayed on strongly to win by two and a half lengths from the favourite Sujet Libre. On 31 August Alson returned to Germany to contest the Group 3 Wackenhut Mercedes-Benz-Preis Zukunfts-Rennen over 1400 metres at Baden-Baden Racecourse in which he was partnered by Filip Minarik and started the 3.9/1 second favourite behind Well of Wisdom, who had finished second to Earthlight in the Prix de Cabourg. After being restrained in the early stages, Alson produced a sustained late run to overtake the favourite 100 metres from the finish and won by two lengths.

Frankie Dettori took the ride when Alson was stepped up to the highest class for the Group 1 Prix Jean-Luc Lagardère over 1600 metres on very soft ground at Longchamp Racecourse on 6 October and started the 8.7/1 fifth choice in a seven-runner field. The colt exceeded expectations as he led from the start until the last 100 metres and then kept on well after being headed by the favourite Victor Ludorum to finish second, beaten three quarters of a length. Third place went to the Irish-trained Armory, winner of the Futurity Stakes. Alson ended his season in the Group 1 Critérium International at Longchamp three weeks later when he was again partnered by Dettori. The heavy ground deterred many potential entrants and only three horses appeared to contest the race, namely Alson (the 1/2 favourite), Armory and the Irish filly Lady Penelope. The field was reduced by a third when Lady Penelope panicked in the starting stalls and had to be withdrawn. The race that ensued was one of the least competitive ever seen for a major prize as Armory began to struggle badly at half way enabling Alson to win unchallenged by twenty lengths. After the race Dettori said "I thought the other one was going to make a bit of a race of it, but he was beaten at halfway. My horse stays, likes the soft, and he won like it was a piece of work... he likes soft, he likes the track, and I suspect the Baron (Gestut Schlenderhan's owner Georg von Ullmann) will target him at the Poule d'Essai next year. He's good enough to give a good account of himself. His form is red-hot."

In the official rating of European two-year-olds for 2019 Alson was given a rating of 111 making him the third-best German juvenile behind Rubaiyat (Preis des Winterfavoriten) and Wonderful Moon (Herzog von Ratibor-Rennen).

=== 2020: three-year-old season ===
At the end of 2019 Gestut Schlenderhan closed their private training facility. For the 2020 season Alson moved into the ownership of Corinna Baronin Von Ullmann and was transferred to the stable of André Fabre at Chantilly in France. The colt made his seasonal debut in the Poule d'Essai des Poulains which, owing to the COVID-19 outbreak was run at Deauville on 1 June. Ridden by Vincent Cheminaud, he started at odds of 8/1 and kept on well in the straight without ever looking likely to win and finished third behind Victor Ludorum and The Summit. In the Prix Jean Prat at the same track in July he raced in second place for most of the way but dropped away quickly in the closing stages to come home tenth of the eleven runners behind Pinatubo, beaten more than twelve lengths by the winner.

After a summer break Alson returned to the track on 2 October, when he was ridden by Pierre-Charles Boudot and was made the odds-on favourite for the Listed Prix Matchem over 1500 metres at Saint-Cloud Racecourse. Racing on heavy ground, he overtook the front-running Real Force inside the last 200 metres and drew away to win by three lengths. Boudot commented "He has lived up to expectations. He won well and this will help him improve his condition and boost his confidence. There is no doubt that he will go on to better things from here." On his final run of the season Alson started odds on favourite for the Group 3 Prix Perth at the same track three weeks later but was beaten into second place by the four-year-old German-trained filly Jin Jin.

== Pedigree ==
Pedigree of Alson (FR), bay colt, 2017
Sire Areion (GER) 1995	Big Shuffle (USA); 1984	Super Concorde	Bold Reasoning
Sire Areion (GER) 1995	Big Shuffle (USA); 1984	Super Concorde	Prime Abord (GB)
Sire Areion (GER) 1995	Big Shuffle (USA); 1984	Raise Your Skirts	Elevation
Sire Areion (GER) 1995	Big Shuffle (USA); 1984	Raise Your Skirts	Strings Attached
Sire Areion (GER) 1995	Aerleona (IRE); 1988	Caerleon (USA)	Nijinsky (CAN)
Sire Areion (GER) 1995	Aerleona (IRE); 1988	Caerleon (USA)	Foreseer
Sire Areion (GER) 1995	Aerleona (IRE); 1988	Alata	Le Levanstell
Sire Areion (GER) 1995	Aerleona (IRE); 1988	Alata	Altamura (GB)
Dam Assisi (GER) 2009	Galileo (IRE); 1998	Sadler's Wells (USA)	Northern Dancer (CAN)
Dam Assisi (GER) 2009	Galileo (IRE); 1998	Sadler's Wells (USA)	Fairy Bridge
Dam Assisi (GER) 2009	Galileo (IRE); 1998	Urban Sea (USA)	Miswaki
Dam Assisi (GER) 2009	Galileo (IRE); 1998	Urban Sea (USA)	Allegretta (GB)
Dam Assisi (GER) 2009	Amarette (GER); 2001	Monsun	Königsstuhl
Dam Assisi (GER) 2009	Amarette (GER); 2001	Monsun	Mosella
Dam Assisi (GER) 2009	Amarette (GER); 2001	Avocette	Kings Lake (USA)
Dam Assisi (GER) 2009	Amarette (GER); 2001	Avocette	Akasma (Family: 2-n)
