= Darley Stud =

Horsebreeding operation

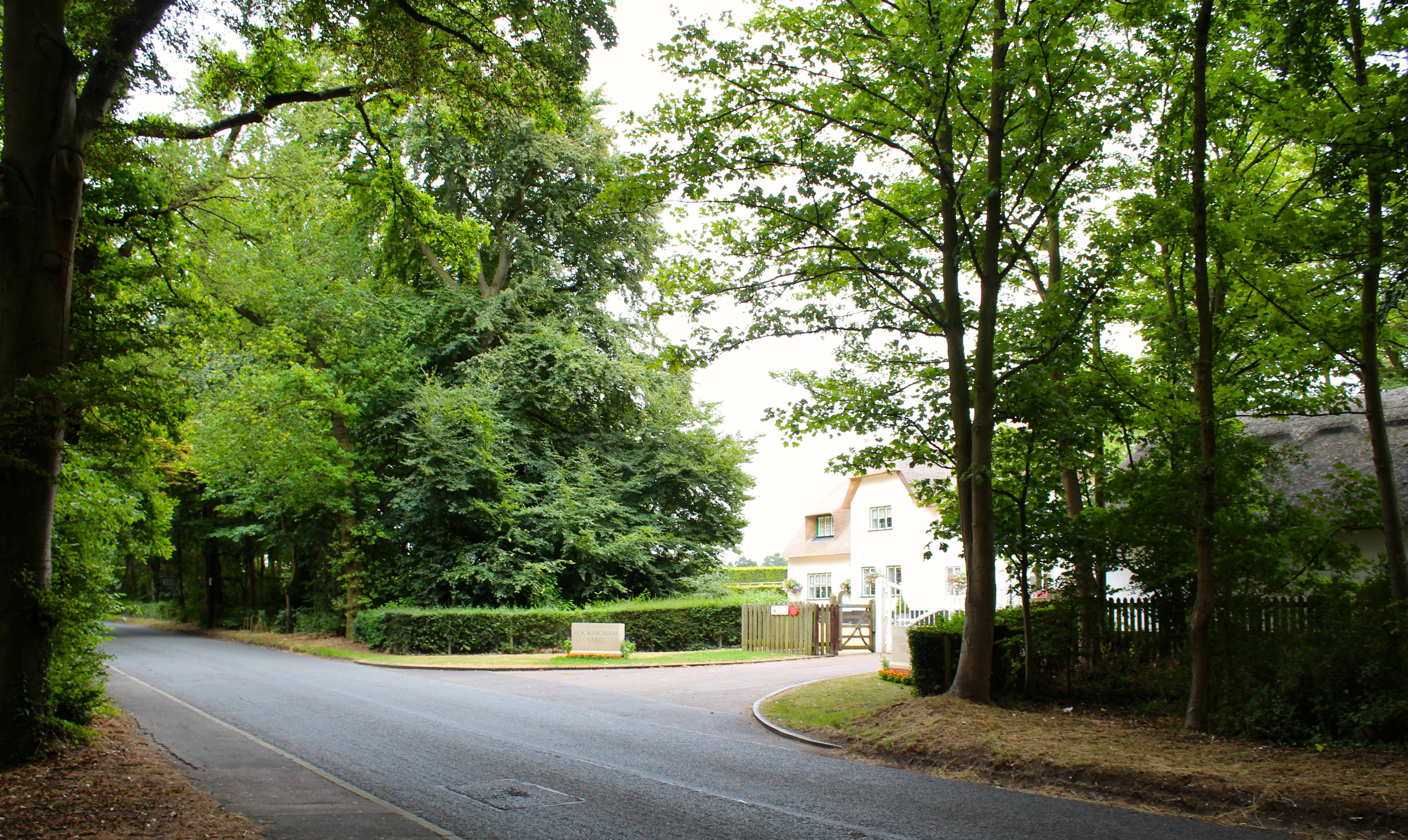
- An entrance to Dalham Hall Stud, part of Darley Stud in Newmarket, Suffolk, England
- Divisions: Dalham Hall Stud, Kildangan Stud, Jonabell Farm, Northwood Park, Kelvinside
- Website: www.darleystallions.com

Darley Stud is located at Dalham Hall, the global breeding operation owned by Sheikh Mohammed bin Rashid al-Maktoum, the ruler of Dubai and vice-president of the United Arab Emirates. It is on the outskirts of Newmarket, Suffolk, the international headquarters and historic home of thoroughbred horse racing.

Darley currently stands more than 50 stallions around the world: in England at Dalham Hall Stud; in Ireland at Kildangan Stud; in the United States at Jonabell Farm, in Lexington, Kentucky; and on two stud farms in Australia: at Northwood Park, Victoria, and at Kelvinside in the Hunter Valley in New South Wales. Darley stallions also stand in France and Japan.

Darley was founded in 1981 when Sheikh Mohammed purchased Dalham Hall Stud. Today, Darley studs are home to many of Europe's leading stallions. These include father and son super sire Dawn Approach and New Approach, and Dubawi, already the sire of a number of G1 winners.

Other famous stallions who have stood at Dalham Hall include Dubai Millennium, Sheikh Mohammed's favourite horse. Born on the stud and trained in Newmarket, he won the Dubai World Cup in 2000 and was the eight-length winner of the Prince of Wales's Stakes at Royal Ascot in the same year. When he retired from horse racing, Dubai Millennium returned to the stud but sired just one crop of foals before dying of grass sickness.

In addition to standing stallions, Darley manages the racing interests of Sheikh Mohammed and various members of the Maktoum family, and has racehorses with a number of trainers in the UK, Ireland, France, the United States, Australia, and Japan. The best of these horses transfer to Godolphin, Sheikh Mohammed's racing stable. Author Jilly Cooper visited the stud as part of her research for the novel Mount!

In 2014, Darley Australia, together with rival Coolmore and a number of local viticulturists, won a battle against Anglo American Coal to stop the expansion of the company's Drayton South open cast mining operation in the Hunter Valley.

== Stallions standing at Darley (2024) ==
=== Dalham Hall Stud, Newmarket, UK ===
- Cracksman
- Dubawi
- Farhh
- Harry Angel (Shuttles to Kelvinside)
- Iffraaj
- Masar
- Modern Games
- Palace Pier (Shuttles to Kelvinside)
- Perfect Power
- Pinatubo (Shuttles to Kelvinside)
- Postponed
- Territories
- Too Darn Hot (Shuttles to Kelvinside)
- Triple Time (Shuttles to Kelvinside)

=== Haras du Logis, Normandy, France ===
- Cloth of Stars
- Ribchester
- Victor Ludorum (Shuttles to Kelvinside)

=== Kildangan Stud, County Kildare, Ireland ===
- Blue Point (Shuttles to Northwood Park)
- Earthlight (Shuttles to Northwood Park)
- Ghaiyyath (Shuttles to Northwood Park)
- Native Trail (Shuttles to Kelvinside)
- Naval Crown
- Night of Thunder
- Profitable
- Raven's Pass
- Space Blues
- Teofilo

=== Jonabell Farm, Kentucky, United States ===
- Enticed
- Essential Quality
- Frosted (Shuttles to Northwood Park)
- Hard Spun
- Maxfield
- Medaglia d'Oro
- Midshipman
- Mystic Guide
- Nyquist
- Speaker's Corner
- Street Sense

=== Kelvinside, New South Wales, Australia ===
- Anamoe
- Astern
- Bivouac
- Exceed and Excel
- Microphone

=== Northwood Park, Victoria, Australia ===
- Brazen Beau
- Impending
- Kermadec
- Paulele

=== Darley Japan ===
- Adayar
- Admire Moon
- American Patriot
- Fine Needle
- Furioso
- Hawkbill
- Hukum
- Palace Malice
- Pyro
- Talismanic
- Thunder Snow
- Tower of London
- Will Take Charge
- Yoshida
