= Pinatubo (horse) =

Irish-bred, British-trained Thoroughbred racehorse

- Racing silks of Godolphin
- Sire: Shamardal
- Grandsire: Giant's Causeway
- Dam: Lava Flow
- Damsire: Dalakhani
- Sex: Colt
- Foaled: 11 March 2017
- Country: Ireland
- Colour: Bay
- Breeder: Godolphin
- Owner: Godolphin
- Trainer: Charlie Appleby
- Record: 10: 7-2-1
- Earnings: £966,090

Major wins
- Woodcote Stakes (2019); Chesham Stakes (2019); Vintage Stakes (2019); National Stakes (2019); Dewhurst Stakes (2019); Prix Jean Prat (2020)

Awards
- Cartier Champion Two-year-old Colt (2019)

Honours
- Timeform rating: 133
- Last updated on 26 June 2022

Pinatubo (foaled 11 March 2017) is an Irish-bred, British-trained Thoroughbred racehorse and sire. He was the top-rated European two-year-old of 2019, when he was unbeaten in six races including the Woodcote Stakes, Chesham Stakes, Vintage Stakes, National Stakes and Dewhurst Stakes. In the following year he won the Prix Jean Prat and was placed in the 2000 Guineas, St James's Palace Stakes and Prix du Moulin.

== Background ==
Pinatubo is a bay colt bred in Ireland by Godolphin in whose blue colours he raced. The colt was sent into training with Charlie Appleby at Godolphin's European base at Newmarket, Suffolk.

He was from the eleventh crop of foals sired by Shamardal, whose wins included the Dewhurst Stakes, Poule d'Essai des Poulains, Prix du Jockey Club and St. James's Palace Stakes.

Pinatubo's dam Lava Flow won two races, including the Listed Prix de la Seine at Longchamp Racecourse in 2013.

== Racing career ==
=== 2019: two-year-old season ===
Pinatubo began his career in an evening novice race at Wolverhampton on 10 May 2019, beating another Godolphin horse, Platinum Star by 3 1/4 lengths. This was followed by a win in the Woodcote Stakes on Oaks day at Epsom. On 22 Jun 2019, Pinatubo was the 3/1 second favourite for the Chesham Stakes at Royal Ascot but beat the favourite, the Aidan O'Brien trained Lope y Fernandez (Round Tower Stakes) by 3 1/4 lengths, breaking the course record in the process. The horse then took a step up to win his first Group race, the Group 2 Vintage Stakes at the Glorious Goodwood meeting by 5 lengths on 30 July.

For his first Group 1 race, the Vincent O'Brien National Stakes at The Curragh, he was ridden for the first time by William Buick. Pinatubo was made 1/3 favourite and won by 9 lengths from Armory (Futurity Stakes), with the Racing Post referring to him as a "Ferrari of a racehorse" and trainer Appleby stating: "He's the best two-year-old I've ever trained". Comparisons were drawn with two-year-old performances from horses like Frankel and Arazi. Following this victory, form analysts Timeform rated him the second-best two-year-old of the modern era behind Celtic Swing

On 12 October, Pinatubo ended his season in the Dewhurst Stakes at Newmarket and started the 1/3 favourite. His eight opponents included Wichita (winner of the Somerville Tattersall Stakes), Positive (Solario Stakes), Arizona (Coventry Stakes) and Mystery Power (Superlative Stakes). After racing in mid-division he overtook the front-running Arizona in the final furlong to win by two lengths.

In the official ratings for the 2019 season, Pinatubo was rated 128, the highest two-year-old rating awarded since Celtic Swing was rated 130 in 1994.

=== 2020: three-year-old season ===
The flat racing season in England was disrupted by the COVID-19 pandemic and the 2000 Guineas was run a month later than usual on 6 June over the Rowley mile at Newmarket. Pinatubo started the 5/6 favourite against fourteen opponents but finished third behind Kameko and Wichita. Two weeks later the colt started favourite for the St James's Palace Stakes at Royal Ascot. He took the lead approaching the final furlong but was overtaken and beaten a length into second place by Palace Pier.

On 12 July Pinatubo was sent to France and started the 3/5 favourite for the Group 1 Prix Jean Prat, run over 1400 metres at Deauville Racecourse. His ten opponents included Alson, Tropbeau (Prix du Calvados), Molatham (Jersey Stakes), Arizona, Wooded and Kenway (Prix La Rochette). Ridden by Buick, he took the lead 200 metres from the finish and kept on well under pressure to win by three-quarters of a length from the 40/1 outsider Lope Y Fernandez. Buick commented: "He felt really good today. He showed his brilliance, he showed how fast he is, and I think coming back to seven furlongs was a little bit easier for him... At Ascot, he did absolutely nothing wrong and he was just outstayed by a horse who was on the improve and was stronger at that trip on that day. But I think he showed his resilience and constitution to come out of that race and do what he did here".

Pinatubo returned to France for the Prix du Moulin over 1600 metres at Longchamp Racecourse on 12 September, in which he was matched against older horses for the first time. Ridden by Doyle, he went off the 1.4/1 favourite and finished strongly to take second place behind the four-year-old Persian King.

On 9 October, it was announced that Pinatubo had been retired from racing and would begin his career as a breeding stallion at the Dalham Hall Stud.

In the 2020 World's Best Racehorse Rankings, Pinatubo was rated on 122, making him the equal twenty-first best racehorse in the world.

== Stud career ==
As well as standing at Dalham Hall Stud, Pinatubo shuttled to Australia with Godolphins' new stallions Bivouac, Ghaiyyath and Earthlight for the 2021 breeding season.

=== Notable progeny ===
c = colt, f = filly, g = gelding

Foaled	Name	Sex	Major wins
2022	Saddadd	c	Grosser Preis von Baden
2023	Global Goal	f	Flight Stakes

== Pedigree ==
Pedigree of Pinatubo (IRE), bay colt, 2017
Sire Shamardal (USA) 2002	Giant's Causeway; 1997	Storm Cat	Storm Bird (CAN)
Sire Shamardal (USA) 2002	Giant's Causeway; 1997	Storm Cat	Terlingua
Sire Shamardal (USA) 2002	Giant's Causeway; 1997	Mariah's Storm	Rahy
Sire Shamardal (USA) 2002	Giant's Causeway; 1997	Mariah's Storm	Immense
Sire Shamardal (USA) 2002	Helsinki (GB); 1993	Machiavellian (USA)	Mr Prospector
Sire Shamardal (USA) 2002	Helsinki (GB); 1993	Machiavellian (USA)	Coup de Folie
Sire Shamardal (USA) 2002	Helsinki (GB); 1993	Helen Street	Troy
Sire Shamardal (USA) 2002	Helsinki (GB); 1993	Helen Street	Waterway (FR)
Dam Lava Flow (IRE) 2010	Dalakhani (IRE); 2000	Darshaan (GB)	Shirley Heights
Dam Lava Flow (IRE) 2010	Dalakhani (IRE); 2000	Darshaan (GB)	Delsy (FR)
Dam Lava Flow (IRE) 2010	Dalakhani (IRE); 2000	Daltawa	Miswaki (USA)
Dam Lava Flow (IRE) 2010	Dalakhani (IRE); 2000	Daltawa	Damana (FR)
Dam Lava Flow (IRE) 2010	Mount Elbrus (GB); 1998	Barathea (IRE)	Sadler's Wells (USA)
Dam Lava Flow (IRE) 2010	Mount Elbrus (GB); 1998	Barathea (IRE)	Brocade (GB)
Dam Lava Flow (IRE) 2010	Mount Elbrus (GB); 1998	El Jazirah	Kris
Dam Lava Flow (IRE) 2010	Mount Elbrus (GB); 1998	El Jazirah	Eljazzi (IRE) (Family: 7-a)
