= Victor Ludorum (horse) =

British-bred racehorse

- Racing silks of Godolphin
- Sire: Shamardal
- Grandsire: Giant's Causeway
- Dam: Antiquities
- Damsire: Kaldounevees
- Sex: Colt
- Foaled: 3 April 2017
- Country: Ireland
- Colour: Bay
- Breeder: Godolphin
- Owner: Godolphin
- Trainer: André Fabre
- Record: 12: 5-0-4
- Earnings: £625,007

Major wins
- Prix Jean-Luc Lagardère (2019); Poule d'Essai des Poulains (2020); Prix Messidor (2021)

Victor Ludorum (foaled 3 April 2017) is a British-bred, French-trained racehorse. He was one of the best juvenile colts in Europe in 2019, when he was undefeated in three starts including the Prix Jean-Luc Lagardère. He went on to win the Poule d'Essai des Poulains and run third in the Prix Du Jockey Club in 2020.

== Background ==
Victor Ludorum is a bay colt with no white markings bred in England by his owners Godolphin. He was sent into training with André Fabre at Chantilly in France.

He was from the eleventh crop of foals sired by Shamardal whose wins included the Dewhurst Stakes, Poule d'Essai des Poulains, Prix du Jockey Club and St. James's Palace Stakes. His other offspring have included Able Friend, Mukhadram, Lope de Vega and Blue Point. Victor Ludorum's dam Antiquities showed some racing ability, winning two races and twice finishing second at Listed level. Her dam Historian was a daughter of the Irish Oaks winner Helen Street and thus a half-sister to both Street Cry and Shamardal's dam Helsinki.

== Racing career ==
=== 2019: two-year-old season ===
Victor Ludorum was ridden in all of his starts as a two-year-old by Mickael Barzalona. The colt made his debut in an event for previously unraced juveniles over 1600 metres at Longchamp Racecourse on 1 September. Starting the 3.5/1 joint-favourite he took the lead in the last 400 metres and drew away to win "comfortably" by three and a half lengths from Twist with Mkfancy taking third place. Thirteen days later Victor Ludorum started 2/5 favourite in a six-runner field for the Prix des Aigles over the same distance at Chantilly Racecourse. After being restrained towards the rear of the field he moved up to dispute the lead in the straight and went clear in the last 100 metres to win by three and a half lengths from Dexter.

On 6 October Victor Ludorum was stepped up in class and started the 1.8/1 favourite for the Group 1 Prix Jean-Luc Lagardère on very soft ground at Longchamp. His six opponents included Armory (winner of the Futurity Stakes), Ecrivain (Prix des Chênes), Kenway (Prix La Rochette) and Alson. Barzalona settled the favourite in fourth place behind Alson, Armory and Ecrivain before switching to the outside to make his challenge in the straight. Victor Ludorum produced a sustained run, overtook Alson 100 metres from the finish and won "readily" by three quarters of a length. After the race André Fabre said "He has a big heart, is a beautiful mover, and he goes on any ground, which was a big, big concern beforehand. He likes to come late and overtake horses. I don't see him as a natural 2-year-old — he is next year's horse. I don't know if he'll stay a mile and a half, but definitely a mile and a quarter, which I think Earthlight will as well. He could start off over a mile... I will have to speak to Sheikh Mohammed regarding plans for next year, but, personally, I would look at a French classic campaign".

In the official rating of European two-year-olds for 2019 Victor Ludorum was rated the joint fifth-best colt of the year, and the second-best French juvenile behind Earthlight.

=== 2020: three-year-old season ===
On 11 May, the day on which French racing restarted after the COVID-19 outbreak Victor Ludorum began his second campaign in the Group 3 Prix de Fontainebleau over 1600 metres on very soft ground at Longchamp. He started the 2/5 favourite but after racing in second place he was unable to make any progress in the straight and came home third behind The Summit (who led from the start) and Ecrivain. Despite his defeat, the colt went off the 7/5 favourite for the Poule d'Essai des Poulains, run that year over 1600 metres at Deauville Racecourse on 1 June with his eight opponents including his old rivals Alson, Ecrivain, The Summit and Kenway as well as Arapaho (Prix du Pont Neuf) and Celestin (Criterium du Languedoc). After being restrained towards the rear of the field by Barzalona he made a forward move 500 metres from the finish, gained the advantage 200 metres out and kept on well to win by one and a half lengths from The Summit. Barzalona commented "He's a powerful horse and today he showed his comeback run did him the world of good. I was able to ride him the way I did at two... He can be a little bit difficult during the preliminaries but he is so straightforward in a race. We went a good even pace and he was just in his racing bubble. He got there gradually and I never had to get serious".

On 5 July at Chantilly, Victor Ludorum started the 2/1 favourite for the Prix du Jockey Club over 2100 metres. He raced towards the rear of the sixteen-runner field he made steady progress in the straight but was unable to reach the lead and came home third behind Mishriff and The Summit, beaten two lengths by the winner. In August Victor Ludorum contested the Group 2 Prix Guillaume d'Ornano over 2000 metres on heavy ground at Deauville and finished third of the four runners behind Mishriff and The Summit. On his final run of the year he finished fifth behind Persian King in the Prix du Moulin at Longchamp on 6 September.

== Pedigree ==
Pedigree of Victor Ludorum (GB), bay colt, 2017
Sire Shamardal (USA) 2002	Giant's Causeway; 1997	Storm Cat	Storm Bird (CAN)
Sire Shamardal (USA) 2002	Giant's Causeway; 1997	Storm Cat	Terlingua
Sire Shamardal (USA) 2002	Giant's Causeway; 1997	Mariah's Storm	Rahy
Sire Shamardal (USA) 2002	Giant's Causeway; 1997	Mariah's Storm	Immense
Sire Shamardal (USA) 2002	Helsinki (GB); 1993	Machiavellian (USA)	Mr. Prospector
Sire Shamardal (USA) 2002	Helsinki (GB); 1993	Machiavellian (USA)	Coup de Folie
Sire Shamardal (USA) 2002	Helsinki (GB); 1993	Helen Street	Troy
Sire Shamardal (USA) 2002	Helsinki (GB); 1993	Helen Street	Waterway (FR)
Dam Antiquities (GB) 2005	Kaldounevees (FR); 1991	Kaldoun	Caro (IRE)
Dam Antiquities (GB) 2005	Kaldounevees (FR); 1991	Kaldoun	Katana
Dam Antiquities (GB) 2005	Kaldounevees (FR); 1991	Safaroa	Satingo (IRE)
Dam Antiquities (GB) 2005	Kaldounevees (FR); 1991	Safaroa	Traverse Afar (USA)
Dam Antiquities (GB) 2005	Historian (IRE) (USA); 1991	Pennekamp (USA)	Bering (GB)
Dam Antiquities (GB) 2005	Historian (IRE) (USA); 1991	Pennekamp (USA)	Coral Dance (FR)
Dam Antiquities (GB) 2005	Historian (IRE) (USA); 1991	Helen Street (GB)	Troy
Dam Antiquities (GB) 2005	Historian (IRE) (USA); 1991	Helen Street (GB)	Waterway (FR) (Family: 1-l)

- Victor Ludorum is inbred 3 × 3 to Helen Street, meaning that this mare appears twice in the third generation of his pedigree.
