= Dankaro =

French-bred Thoroughbred racehorse

- Sire: Dan Cupid
- Grandsire: Native Dancer
- Dam: Takaroa
- Damsire: Prince Bio
- Sex: Stallion
- Foaled: 8 May 1971
- Country: France
- Colour: Chestnut
- Breeder: Marcel Boussac
- Owner: Marcel Boussac
- Trainer: Roger Poincelet
- Record: 8:4-2-1

Major wins
- Prix de Cabourg (1973); Prix Greffulhe (1974); Prix Daru (1974); Prix Lupin (1974)

Awards
- Timeform top-rated three-year-old (1974); Top-rated French three-year-old colt (1974); Timeform rating 131 (1974)

Dankaro (8 May 1971 died 30 September 1976) was a French Thoroughbred racehorse and sire. One of the last champions bred by Marcel Boussac, he showed promise as a two-year-old in 1973 when he won the Prix de Cabourg. In the following spring he established himself as arguably the best three-year-old colt in Europe with successive wins in the Prix Greffulhe, Prix Daru and Prix Lupin. He finished second when favourite for the Prix du Jockey Club and was the first male horse to finish when third to Dahlia in the King George VI and Queen Elizabeth Stakes. His racing career was then ended by injury and he was retired to stud where he had no success as a breeding stallion.

== Background ==
Dankaro was a chestnut horse with a narrow white blaze and four short white socks bred by his owner Marcel Boussac at his Haras de Fresnay-le-Buffard in Lower Normandy. By the 1970s, Boussac's textile business, which had made him one of the richest men in France, was in severe difficulties and his studs were producing few top-class performers. Dankaro was sired by Dan Cupid, a Kentucky-bred, French-trained stallion best known as the sire of Sea Bird. Dankaro's dam, Takaroa, came from one of Boussac's best families, being a daughter of the Prix Vermeille winner Arbencia, who was herself a daughter of the Poule d'Essai des Pouliches winner Palencia. The colt was sent into training with Roger Poincelet (1920–1977), formerly a leading jockey.

== Racing career ==
=== 1973: two-year-old season ===
After finishing second over 1100 metres on his racecourse debut, and then won the Prix de Cabourg over 1200 metres at Deauville Racecourse. He was then moved up in class for the Group One Prix Morny over the same course and distance on 19 August. Ridden by Freddy Head he started at odds of 14/1 and finished sixth of the seven runners behind Nonoalco.

=== 1974: three-year-old season ===
On his three-year-old debut, Dankaro started an 18.5/1 outsider for the Prix Greffulhe over 2100 metres at Longchamp Racecourse on 7 April. Ridden by Gérard Rivases he was restrained in the early stages before producing a strong late run to win by three quarters of a length from Battle Song with Steinway in third. Two weeks later, the colt started 3.9/1 second favourite for the Prix Daru over the same course and distance in which he was opposed by Battle Song, Sagaro, Sean and the favourite Kamaraan (runner-up in the Prix de Condé). Dankaro produced a similar performance to the one he produced in the Greffulhe, coming from well off the pace to take the lead in the closing stages and won by half a length and two lengths from Sean and the 62/1 outsider Kervic. Dankaro faced much stronger opposition in the Prix Lupin at Longchamp on 19 May. His rivals included Mississipian [sic], the top-rated French two-year-old of 1973, Moulines, the winner of the Poule d'Essai des Poulains and D'Arras (Prix Noailles). Starting the 1.7/1 favourite, Dankaro produced his customary late run to win by half a length from Mississipian, with Moulines two and a half lengths back in third.

On 9 June, Dankaro started the 1.5/1 favourite for the Prix du Jockey Club over 2400 metres at Chantilly Racecourse. Mississipian, Kamaraan, Sean, Moulines, Steinway and D'Arras were again in opposition along with Mount Hagen (Prix de Fontainebleau) and Un Kopeck (Prix La Force). Dankaro was held up at the back of the field by Rivases but when he began to move forward in the straight he struggled to obtain a clear run and had to be switched to the outside. He then made rapid progress and looked likely to win 200 metres from the finish but was unable to overhaul the 45/1 outsider Caracolero and finished second, beaten one and a half lengths. In July, Dankaro was matched against older horses for the first time when he contested Britain's most prestigious weight-for-age race, the King George VI and Queen Elizabeth Stakes over one and a half miles at Ascot Racecourse. He raced in fifth place before dropping to the back of the eleven runner field at half way: Rivases claimed that he had been badly bumped. In the straight, Dankaro produced his usual strong finish to take third place behind the fillies Dahlia and Highclere. Dankaro missed the rest of the season with injury and did not race again.

== Stud record ==
Dankaro made very little impact as a breeding stallion, siring few foals and no winners of any consequence. According to one questionable source he died in 1979 at the age of eight.

== Assessment ==
There was no International Classification of European two-year-olds in 1973: the official handicappers of Britain, Ireland and France compiled separate rankings for horses which competed in those countries. In the French Free Handicap Dankaro was rated seventeen pounds behind the top-rated Mississipian. In 1974 he was rated level with Caracolero as the best three-year-old colt in France, a pound behind the filly Comtesse de Loir. The independent Timeform organisation gave him a rating of 131, making him their top-rated three-year-old alongside Caracolero, Comtesse de Loir, Nonoalco and Sagaro.

== Pedigree ==
Pedigree of Dankaro (FR), chestnut stallion, 1971
Sire Dan Cupid (USA) 1956	Native Dancer (USA); 1950	Polynesian	Unbreakable
Sire Dan Cupid (USA) 1956	Native Dancer (USA); 1950	Polynesian	Black Polly
Sire Dan Cupid (USA) 1956	Native Dancer (USA); 1950	Geisha	Discovery
Sire Dan Cupid (USA) 1956	Native Dancer (USA); 1950	Geisha	Miyako
Sire Dan Cupid (USA) 1956	Vixenette (USA); 1944	Sickle	Phalaris
Sire Dan Cupid (USA) 1956	Vixenette (USA); 1944	Sickle	Selene
Sire Dan Cupid (USA) 1956	Vixenette (USA); 1944	Lady Reynard	Gallant Fox
Sire Dan Cupid (USA) 1956	Vixenette (USA); 1944	Lady Reynard	Nerva
Dam Takaroa (FR) 1962	Prince Bio (FR); 1941	Prince Rose	Rose Prince
Dam Takaroa (FR) 1962	Prince Bio (FR); 1941	Prince Rose	Indolence
Dam Takaroa (FR) 1962	Prince Bio (FR); 1941	Biologie	Bacteriophage
Dam Takaroa (FR) 1962	Prince Bio (FR); 1941	Biologie	Eponge
Dam Takaroa (FR) 1962	Arbencia (FR); 1954	Arbar	Djebel
Dam Takaroa (FR) 1962	Arbencia (FR); 1954	Arbar	Astronmomie
Dam Takaroa (FR) 1962	Arbencia (FR); 1954	Palencia	Pharis
Dam Takaroa (FR) 1962	Arbencia (FR); 1954	Palencia	Hestia (Family 14)
