= Dabirsim =

French-bred Thoroughbred racehorse

- Sire: Hat Trick
- Grandsire: Sunday Silence
- Dam: Rumored
- Damsire: Royal Academy II
- Sex: Stallion
- Foaled: 2009
- Country: France
- Colour: Dark Bay / Brown
- Breeder: Mme L Monfort
- Owner: Simon Springer
- Trainer: Christophe Ferland
- Record: 7: 5-1-0
- Earnings: £460,480

Major wins
- Prix de Cabourg (2011); Prix Jean-Luc Lagardère (2011); Prix Morny (2011)

Awards
- European Champion Two-Year-Old Colt (2011)

Dabirsim (foaled 2009) is a thoroughbred racehorse trained in France. He was undefeated at the age of two years with two Group One wins in 2011. He then lost his first two races as a three-year-old in France.

== Race career ==
Dabirsim made his debut on 8 June, and won by 10 lengths at La Teste-de-Buch over 1200 metres. The first defeat was down to the jockey (Christophe Soumillon) as he eased the horse at the line and then got beaten by a nostril as one of the rival horses (Dragon Pulse) made a strong run down the outside to win on the line. The next loss was also very unlucky as Dabirsim was stuck in traffic and could not get in the clear to make his run.

== Stallion ==
Dabirsim started his career at stud in Germany in 2014 to 2015. In 2016 he was back to France in Haras de Grandcamp (who sold him in Arqana auction sales) and covered 162 mares. His first crop are yearling in 2016.

- Dabirsim at stud, part of his best races and part of his progenity
