= Persian King (horse) =

Irish-bred racehorse

- Sire: Kingman
- Grandsire: Invincible Spirit
- Dam: Pretty Please
- Damsire: Dylan Thomas
- Sex: Stallion
- Foaled: 18 February 2016
- Country: Ireland
- Colour: Bay
- Breeder: Dayton Investments
- Owner: Ballymore Thoroughbred Ltd; Godolphin
- Trainer: André Fabre
- Record: 13: 8-3-1
- Earnings: £1,296,624

Major wins
- Autumn Stakes (2018); Prix de Fontainebleau (2019); Poule d'Essai des Poulains (2019); Prix du Muguet (2020); Prix d'Ispahan (2020); Prix du Moulin de Longchamp (2020)

Persian King (foaled 18 February 2016) is a retired Irish-bred, French-trained Thoroughbred racehorse and active sire. He showed very promising form as a two-year-old in 2018 when he won three of his four races including a very competitive edition of the Autumn Stakes. In the following year he won the Prix de Fontainebleau and Poule d'Essai des Poulains before finishing second in the Prix du Jockey Club. He reached his peak as a four-year-old in 2020 when he won the Prix du Muguet, Prix d'Ispahan and Prix du Moulin de Longchamp as well as running third in the Prix de l'Arc de Triomphe.

== Background ==
Persian King is a bay horse with no white markings bred in Ireland by Dayton Investments, a breeding company associated with the Wildenstein family. He entered the ownership of Ballymore Thoroughbred Ltd and was sent into training with André Fabre at Chantilly in France. Persian King was ridden in all of his races by Pierre-Charles Boudot.

He was from the first crop of foals sired by Kingman who was named Cartier Horse of the Year in 2014 when he won the Irish 2000 Guineas, St. James's Palace Stakes, Sussex Stakes and Prix Jacques Le Marois.

Persian King's dam Pretty Please showed modest racing ability in a brief racing career, winning one of her two races in France. Pretty Please was a half-sister to the Prix Ganay winner Planteur, and as a descendant of the broodmare Petroleuse (foaled 1978), was closely related to Pawneese and Peintre Celebre.

== Racing career ==
=== 2018: two-year-old season ===
On his racecourse debut the Persian King started 1.1/1 favourite for a maiden race over 1500 metres at Deauville Racecourse on 7 August but finished second, beaten two lengths by the Freddy Head-trained Anodor. On 1 September at Chantilly Racecourse Persian King started 2/5 favourite for a similar event over 1600 metres on good to soft ground and recorded his first success as he came home six lengths clear of his five opponents. Two weeks later the colt started 3/5 favourite for a more competitive race over the same course and distance and won again, taking the lead 300 metres out and accelerating away from his rivals to win "easily" by five lengths from Lone Peak.

On 13 October Persian King was sent to England and was made 6/5 favourite for the Group 3 Autumn Stakes over the Rowley Mile at Newmarket Racecourse in which his seven opponents included four from England and three from the Irish stable of Aidan O'Brien. After tracking the leaders Persian King took the lead a furlong out and got the better of a "sustained duel" with Magna Grecia to win by a neck with three lengths back to Circus Maximus in third. After the race the owner's representative Anthony Stroud said He's a very good horse who has won his last three races. The jockey said he handled the ground really well but it turned out to be a tougher race than we thought. He certainly showed courage. He's out of a Dylan Thomas mare so we know he's going to stay further and I can see him going up in trip next season".

=== 2019: three-year-old season ===
Before the start of the season, a majority share in Persian King was acquired by Godolphin. The colt began his campaign in the Group 3 Prix de Fontainebleau over 1600 metres at Longchamp Racecourse on 14 April. Starting the 1/5 favourite Persian King took the lead soon after the start and was never challenged, drawing away in the closing stages to win by five lengths from Epic Hero. Four weeks later, over the same course and distance on heavy ground, the colt was stepped up to the highest class and started the 1/2 favourite for the Group 1 Poule de'Essai des Poulains. His nine opponents included Shaman (Prix La Force), Anodor (Prix des Chênes), Munitions (Prix Djebel), San Donato (Doncaster Stakes), Duke of Hazzard (Prix Isonomy) and Van Beethoven (Railway Stakes). Persian King raced in fifth place as the outsider Senza Limiti set the pace before moving up on the inside to take the lead 300 metres from the finish. He kept on well in the closing stages to win by a length and a head from Shaman and San Donato. After the race André Fabre said "He would prefer good ground. The Jockey Club was the long-term plan, so we'll see. The other option is to wait for Ascot, but we'll decide with Sheikh Mohammed and Diane Wildenstein. The Jockey Club seems the obvious target."

As Fabre had predicted, Persian King reappeared in the Prix du Jockey Club over 2000 metres at Chantilly on 2 June and went off the 1.8/1 favourite in a fifteen-runner field. After racing in mid division he took the lead inside the last 400 metres but was soon overtaken and beaten two lengths into second place by Sottsass. After the race Persian King was reported to be "sore" and Fabre announced in July that the colt would be unlikely to race again in 2019.

In the 2019 World's Best Racehorse Rankings Persian King was given a rating of 117, making him the 112th best racehorse in the world.

=== 2020: four-year-old season ===
The flat racing season in Europe was restructured as a result of the COVID-19 pandemic and Persian King made his first appearance in the Listed Prix de Montretout which was run over 1600 metres behind closed doors at Chantilly on 10 June. He started the odds-on favourite but was unable to run down his front-running stablemate Magny Cours and was beaten a short neck into second place. Eighteen days later the colt started 0.6/1 favourite in a five-runner field for the Group 2 Prix du Muguet over 1600 metres at Saint-Cloud Racecourse. He led for most of the way and after being overtaken by the five-year-old Pretreville he rallied to regain the advantage in the closing stages to win by one and a quarter lengths. On 19 July Persian King returned to Group 1 class and started the odds-on favourite for the Prix d'Ispahan over 1800 metres at Chantilly. His seven opponents included Shaman, Positive (Solario Stakes), Stormy Antarctic (Premio Presidente della Repubblica) and Century Dream (Diomed Stakes). After settling in second place behind the outsider Pogo, Persian King went to the front 500 metres from the finish, broke clear of his opponents and "kept on well" to win by two lengths from Stormy Antarctic. Andre Fabre commented "He's given us some heartaches and some headaches as well. He's a fantastic athlete, and it's quite common for big horses like that to need a bit of time."

In the Prix Jacques le Marois over 1600 metres on heavy ground at Deauville in August Persian King started 2/1 second favourite in a seven-runner field but never looked likely to win and came home fourth behind Palace Pier, Alpine Star and Circus Maximus beaten almost nine lengths by the winner. On better ground at Longchamp on 6 September Persian King started 3.6/1 second favourite behind Pinatubo for the Prix du Moulin in a six-runner field which also included Siskin, Circus Maximus, Romanised and Victor Ludorum. Persian King tracked the leader Circus Maximus in the early stages, took the lead 400 out and won by one and a half lengths from Pinatubo. After the race Fabre said "It was obviously a very good race with almost the best of both generations, so what can you say? You can consider him the best European miler alongside Palace Pier. He had some issues, which meant I couldn't train him properly until now. But now he is really fit and he showed how good he really is."

For his final racecourse appearance Persian King was stepped up in distance for the Prix de l'Arc de Triomphe over 2400 metres at Longchamp on 4 October and went off the 6.3/1 third favourite in an eleven-runner field. The colt went into the lead from the start and set a steady pace, maintaining his advantage into the straight before being overtaken 200 metres from the finish and coming home third behind Sotsass and In Swoop. Fabre said "I was pleased with his race and we had no excuses, I think he ran well. It was his first run over that distance and the ground was very soft. Perhaps if it wasn’t he may have held on. Who knows. I don’t think he'll run again."

In the 2020 World's Best Racehorse Rankings, Persian King was rated on 125, making him the equal third best racehorse in the world and the best horse trained in France.

== Stud career ==
After his retirement from racing in October 2020 Persian King became a breeding stallion at the Haras d'Etreham in Normandy.

== Pedigree ==
Pedigree of Persian King (FR), bay colt, 2016
Sire Kingman (GB) 2011	Invincible Spirit (IRE); 1997	Green Desert (USA)	Danzig
Sire Kingman (GB) 2011	Invincible Spirit (IRE); 1997	Green Desert (USA)	Foreign Courier
Sire Kingman (GB) 2011	Invincible Spirit (IRE); 1997	Rafha (GB)	Kris
Sire Kingman (GB) 2011	Invincible Spirit (IRE); 1997	Rafha (GB)	Eljazzi (IRE)
Sire Kingman (GB) 2011	Zenda (GB); 1999	Zamindar (USA)	Gone West
Sire Kingman (GB) 2011	Zenda (GB); 1999	Zamindar (USA)	Zaizafon
Sire Kingman (GB) 2011	Zenda (GB); 1999	Hope (IRE)	Dancing Brave (USA)
Sire Kingman (GB) 2011	Zenda (GB); 1999	Hope (IRE)	Bahamian
Dam Pretty Please (IRE) 2009	Dylan Thomas (IRE); 2003	Danehill (USA)	Danzig
Dam Pretty Please (IRE) 2009	Dylan Thomas (IRE); 2003	Danehill (USA)	Razyana
Dam Pretty Please (IRE) 2009	Dylan Thomas (IRE); 2003	Lagrion (USA)	Diesis (GB)
Dam Pretty Please (IRE) 2009	Dylan Thomas (IRE); 2003	Lagrion (USA)	Wrap It Up (IRE)
Dam Pretty Please (IRE) 2009	Plante Rare (IRE); 2002	Giant's Causeway (USA)	Storm Cat
Dam Pretty Please (IRE) 2009	Plante Rare (IRE); 2002	Giant's Causeway (USA)	Mariah's Storm
Dam Pretty Please (IRE) 2009	Plante Rare (IRE); 2002	Palmeraie (USA)	Lear Fan
Dam Pretty Please (IRE) 2009	Plante Rare (IRE); 2002	Palmeraie (USA)	Petroleuse (IRE) (Family: 9)

- Persian King is inbred 4 × 4 to Danzig, meaning that this stallion appears twice in the fourth generation of his pedigree.
