= Palace Pier (horse) =

British-bred Thoroughbred racehorse

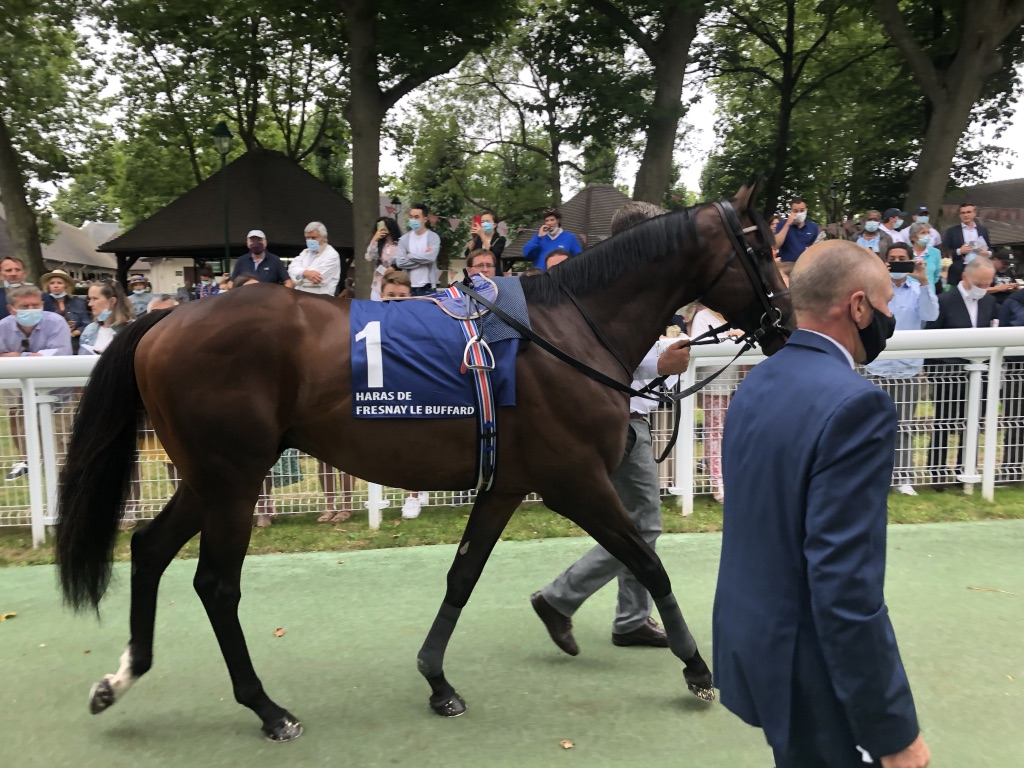
- Palace Pier at Deauville, August 2021
- Sire: Kingman
- Grandsire: Invincible Spirit
- Dam: Beach Frolic
- Damsire: Nayef
- Sex: Stallion
- Foaled: 20 March 2017
- Country: United Kingdom
- Colour: Bay
- Breeder: Highclere Stud & Floors Farming
- Owner: Hamdan bin Mohammed Al Maktoum
- Trainer: John Gosden; John & Thady Gosden
- Record: 11: 9-1-1
- Earnings: £1,540,410

Major wins
- St James's Palace Stakes (2020); Prix Jacques Le Marois (2020, 2021); Sandown Mile (2021); Lockinge Stakes (2021); Queen Anne Stakes (2021)

Awards
- Cartier Champion Three-year-old Colt (2020); Cartier Champion Older Horse (2021); Timeform rating: 132
- Last updated on 16 June 2025

Racing silks of Hamdan bin Mohammed Al Maktoum

Palace Pier (foaled 20 March 2017) is a British Thoroughbred racehorse. He won two minor events as a juvenile and a handicap race on his three-year-old debut before emerging as a top-class performer with victories in the St James's Palace Stakes and Prix Jacques Le Marois. In 2021 he won the Sandown Mile, Lockinge Stakes, Queen Anne Stakes and a second Prix Jacques Le Marois.

== Background ==
Palace Pier is a bay colt with a white star bred in England by the Highclere Stud & Floors Farming. As a yearling in October 2018 he was put up for auction at Tattersalls and bought for 600,000 guineas by the trainer John Gosden. He entered the ownership of Godolphin but was before his racing career began he was transferred to the ownership of Hamdan bin Mohammed Al Maktoum.

He was from the second crop of foals sired by Kingman who was named Cartier Horse of the Year in 2014 when he won the Irish 2,000 Guineas, St James's Palace Stakes, Sussex Stakes and Prix Jacques Le Marois. Palace Pier's dam Beach Frolic was an unraced half-sister to Bonfire (Dante Stakes) and Joviality (Windsor Forest Stakes). She was a great-granddaughter of the French broodmare Miss Satin (foaled 1975) whose other descendants have included Blue Bunting and Miss Satamixa (Prix Jacques Le Marois).

== Racing career ==
=== 2019: two-year-old season ===
Frankie Dettori rode Palace Pier on both of his races in 2019. The colt began his track career in a maiden race over seven furlongs at Sandown Park on 30 August when he started the 11/8 favourite and won by three and three quarter lengths after taking the lead a furlong from the finish and drawing away from his opponents in the closing stages. On 18 September, over the same course and distance, the colt started at odds of 1/8 for a novice race (for horses with no more than two previous wins) in which he led from the start and won by four and a half lengths from Mars Landing despite being eased down in the final furlong.

=== 2020: three-year-old season ===
The flat racing season in England was disrupted by the COVID-19 pandemic and Palace Pier did not make his reappearance until 6 June when he carried top weight of 131 pounds in a handicap race over one mile on the synthetic Tapeta at Newcastle Racecourse. Ridden by Robert Havlin he started the 11/10 favourite and won in "impressive" style by three lengths after coming from well off the pace to take the lead inside the final furlong. Two weeks after his win at Newcastle the colt was stepped up sharply in class to contest the Group 1 St James's Palace Stakes at Royal Ascot in which he was partnered by Dettori and started at odds of 4/1. Pinatubo started favourite while the other five runners included Wichita (second in the 2000 Guineas), Positive (Solario Stakes), Threat (Gimcrack Stakes), Arizona (Coventry Stakes) and Royal Dornoch (Royal Lodge Stakes). After starting slowly and racing towards the rear of the field Palace Pier began to make progress on the final turn, moved into contention a furlong out, and overtook Pinatubo in the closing stages to win "readily" by a length. After the race John Gosden said "The race panned out well. Frankie said he wanted to ride him a little cold and settle him... It was no fluke, he is a very talented horse... It's a stiff old mile at Ascot and he showed his stamina" before indicating that the colt would be aimed at the Prix Jacques Le Marois. Dettori, who was winning his 73rd race at Royal Ascot commented "It was hard to really get him fit, but John thought let's start him in a handicap which should wake him up, and it did... We always thought a lot of Palace Pier but his work in the spring wasn't what we thought it could've been, but since Newcastle he's turned a page. I expect him to improve".

On 16 August Palace Pier was matched against older horses for the first time when he was sent to France to contest the Group 1 Prix Jacques le Marois over 1600 metres on heavy ground at Deauville Racecourse. With Dettori in the saddle he went off the 1.3/1 favourite ahead of six opponents including Persian King, Alpine Star, Circus Maximus and Romanised. After being restrained towards the rear of the field he made rapid progress to take the lead 200 metres from the finish and held off the sustained challenge of Alpine Star to win by three quarters of a length with a gap of five lengths back to Circus Maximus in third. Gosden, who watched the race on television in England owing to quarantine rules said "He's never even worked on soft ground. It was a bit of a shock to him. He's impressed me with his courage. I know he's got a bundle of ability, but fully at the 600 meters where they join the main track, I saw Frankie's hands having to nurse him, and I thought, 'Uh-oh ... he's hating this ground,' and I don't think he liked it one bit. But he just showed a lot of class and guts to get the job done. We've got to be thrilled with him".

On his final run of the season Palace Pier started the odds-on favourite for the Group 1 Queen Elizabeth II Stakes over one mile at Ascot on 17 October. He recovered from a poor start to move up into a challenging position two furlongs out but after losing a shoe he was unable to maintain his run and finished third behind The Revenant and Roseman.

On 19 November Palace Pier was named Champion Three-year-old Colt at the Cartier Racing Awards. In the 2020 World's Best Racehorse Rankings, Palace Pier was rated on 125, making him the equal third best racehorse in the world and the best three-year-old in Europe.

=== 2021: four-year-old season ===
==== Spring ====
Palace Pier was ridden by Dettori in his first four starts of 2021. The colt's third campaign began in the Group 2 Sandown Mile on 23 April when he started odds-on favourite against three opponents. He took the lead approaching the final furlong and drew away in the closing stages to win "comfortably" by eight lengths from Bless Him. John Gosden commented "I was very clear that Palace Pier was at 80 per cent, but, luckily, no-one put it up to him today. He enjoys this track and won as a two-year-old here. It was a good performance and Frankie was very happy with him. He's having a good blow, but this will save me going up the all-weather gallops 100 times with him."

At Newbury Racecourse on 15 May Palace Pier started the 1/2 favourite for the Group 1 Lockinge Stakes with the best fancied of his ten opponents being the Aidan O'Brien-trained Lope Y Fernandez. The colt settled towards the rear of the field before moving up to take the lead two furlongs from the finish and won by one and a half lengths from the five-year-old mare Lady Bowthorpe with a gap of five and a half lengths back to the third place finisher Top Rank. After the race Dettori said "He found a nice rhythm and I knew he hits a flat spot between the two and three so I went to lay up, and he went whoosh and just took off... He could be the best miler I've ridden".

==== Summer ====
At Royal Ascot on 15 July Palace Pier started 2/7 favourite for the Queen Anne Stakes in an eleven-runner field which also included Order of Australia, Accidental Agent, Lord Glitters, Top Rank and Bless Him. Palace Pier settled in fourth place as Prince Eiji and Pogo disputed the lead before moving up to take the lead approaching the final furlong. He quickly opened up a clear advantage and stayed on well to win by one and a half lengths from Lope Y Fernandez. John Gosden commented "When you're odds-on like that it would be a bit odd if you weren't nervous, because the only thing around the corner is the banana skin, so it can happen, but I think Frankie was aware there would be no pace and he just asserted early. He's done it very smoothly. He's come through, won his race, but he's exactly like his father Kingman, as soon as he gets there he's done enough, and if I worked him at home with a very ordinary horse he would just stay with him, that's his game." Palace Pier was expected to reappear in the Sussex Stakes at Goodwood Racecourse in July but bypassed the race after he was found to be suffering from a "blood disorder".

On 15 August Palace Pier attempted to repeat his 2020 victory in the Prix Jacques le Marois at Deauville and started the odds-on favorite in an eight-runner field which included Poetic Flare, Order of Australia, Alpine Star and Victor Ludorum. He settled towards the rear before beginning to make progress 500 metres from the finish and overtook Poetic Flare inside the last 100 metres to win by a neck. Commenting on the colt's interrupted preparation John Gosden said "I've made no secret of the fact that I lost a lot of time with him... we've come here on the complete minimum of work. Frankie reported that he came there smoothly and his class got him through... We always wanted to come back here but I've run a horse who is only on 80 per cent... He was just tiring towards those last few strides, but that's because he was ill and he missed quite a lot of time that you can't afford to lose coming into a Group 1".

==== Autumn ====
Palace Pier ended his racing career on 16 October at Ascot when he made his second attempt to win the Queen Elizabeth II Stakes and started the 6/4 favourite. He moved into contention in the last quarter mile but was unable to get on terms with the three-year-old Baaeed and was beaten a neck into second place. John Gosden was "frustrated" by the way the race developed, commenting "Frankie said the pace was slow – it was too slow. He regrets not committing earlier. There was too much looking around – and he knows that." Four days later it was announced that Palace Pier had been retired from racing. Gosden said "He's raced brilliantly this year, starting at Sandown, but his performance in the Lockinge was quite brilliant and he's always been a lovely horse to be around. He had a great attitude, physique and action... It's been a pleasure to train him. He had a great mind and was very genuine."

On 10 November Palace Pier was named Champion Older Horse at the Cartier Racing Awards.

== Pedigree ==
Pedigree of Palace Pier (GB), bay colt, 2017
Sire Kingman (GB) 2011	Invincible Spirit (IRE); 1997	Green Desert (USA)	Danzig
Sire Kingman (GB) 2011	Invincible Spirit (IRE); 1997	Green Desert (USA)	Foreign Courier
Sire Kingman (GB) 2011	Invincible Spirit (IRE); 1997	Rafha (GB)	Kris
Sire Kingman (GB) 2011	Invincible Spirit (IRE); 1997	Rafha (GB)	Eljazzi (IRE)
Sire Kingman (GB) 2011	Zenda (GB); 1999	Zamindar (USA)	Gone West
Sire Kingman (GB) 2011	Zenda (GB); 1999	Zamindar (USA)	Zaizafon
Sire Kingman (GB) 2011	Zenda (GB); 1999	Hope (IRE)	Dancing Brave (USA)
Sire Kingman (GB) 2011	Zenda (GB); 1999	Hope (IRE)	Bahamian
Dam Beach Frolic (GB) 2011	Nayef (USA); 1998	Gulch	Mr. Prospector
Dam Beach Frolic (GB) 2011	Nayef (USA); 1998	Gulch	Jameela
Dam Beach Frolic (GB) 2011	Nayef (USA); 1998	Height of Fashion (FR)	Bustino (GB)
Dam Beach Frolic (GB) 2011	Nayef (USA); 1998	Height of Fashion (FR)	Highclere (GB)
Dam Beach Frolic (GB) 2011	Night Frolic (GB); 2001	Night Shift (USA)	Northern Dancer (CAN)
Dam Beach Frolic (GB) 2011	Night Frolic (GB); 2001	Night Shift (USA)	Ciboulette (CAN)
Dam Beach Frolic (GB) 2011	Night Frolic (GB); 2001	Miss d'Ouilly (FR)	Bikala (IRE)
Dam Beach Frolic (GB) 2011	Night Frolic (GB); 2001	Miss d'Ouilly (FR)	Miss Satin (Family: 4-n)

== Stud career ==
Palace Pier commenced stud duties at Dalham Hall Stud, Newmarket. In the 2022 season he was shuttled to Kelvinside in New South Wales, Australia for a $55,000 stud fee.
