= Caracolero =

American-bred Thoroughbred racehorse

- Sire: Graustark
- Grandsire: Ribot
- Dam: Betty Loraine
- Damsire: Prince John
- Sex: Stallion
- Foaled: 1971
- Country: United States
- Colour: Chestnut
- Breeder: Leslie Combs II
- Owner: María Félix-Berger
- Trainer: François Boutin
- Record: 7:4-1-1

Major wins
- Prix Barneveldt (1974); Prix Matchem (1974); Prix du Jockey-Club (1974)

Awards
- Timeform top-rated three-year-old (1974); Top-rated French three-year-old colt (1974); Timeform rating 131 (1974)

Caracolero (1971 – after 1987) was a Kentucky-bred, French-trained Thoroughbred racehorse and sire. He showed some promise as a two-year-old in 1973, winning one of his three races, but was rated well behind the best of his year in France. In the following year he won the Prix Barneveldt and the Prix Matchem before establishing himself as one of the best European colts of his generation with an upset win in the Prix du Jockey-Club. He was injured in his only subsequent race and was retired to stud, where he had little success as a sire of winners.

== Background ==
Caracolero was a chestnut horse with a white star and short white socks on his left feet bred in Kentucky by Leslie Combs II. His sire Graustark had a brief but promising racing career before becoming a very successful breeding stallion whose progeny included Prove Out, Key To The Mint, Avatar and Jim French. Caracolero's dam Betty Lorraine went on to produce Betty's Secret, who in turn produced The Derby winner Secreto: her dam Gay Hostess also produced Majestic Prince, Crowned Prince (winner of Dewhurst Stakes) and Meadow Blue (grand-dam of Real Quiet). Gay Hostess was a granddaughter of the broodmare Boudoir, whose other descendants included Daiwa Major, Flower Bowl and Caracolero's sire Graustark.

As a yearling, Caracolero was offered for sale at the Keeneland and was bought for $75,000 by representatives of María Félix, a Mexican actress and wife of French financier Alex Berger. He was sent to Europe to be trained in France by François Boutin. Caracolero is the common Spanish name of the snail kite (Rostrhamus sociabilis).

== Racing career ==
=== 1973: two-year-old season ===
Caracolero did not race until the autumn when he ran three times in minor events. After finishing third in the Prix Fontenoy over 1600 metres on his debut and then won over the same distance before running second over 1800 metres on his final appearance of the season.

=== 1974: three-year-old season ===
On his debut as a three-year-old, Caracolero, ridden by Yves Saint-Martin won by a neck in the Prix Barneveldt over 1800 metres at Maisons-Laffitte Racecourse in April. The British jockey Lester Piggott came over to France and rode the colt in his next race, the Prix Matchem at Evry Racecourse. He won again but was not particularly impressive, beating Top Command and the filly Ribblesdale by a neck and a head.

On 9 June, Caracolero started a 41/1 outsider in a fifteen-runner field for the Prix du Jockey-Club over 2400 metres at Chantilly Racecourse. With Saint-Martin and Piggott being claimed to ride other horses, the colt was ridden by Philippe Paquet. The favourite was the Prix Lupin winner Dankaro, with the other contenders including Mississipian Grand Critérium, Poil de Chameau (Prix Hocquart), Moulines (Poule d'Essai des Poulains), D'Arras (Prix Noailles), Mount Hagen (Prix de Fontainebleau) and Un Kopeck (Prix La Force). In the early stages Paquet settled Caracolero in third behind Steinway and Kamaraan with Mount Hagen, Top Command and Moulines close behind. Mount Hagen took the lead early in the straight but was soon overtaken by Caracolero, who established a clear advantage 200 metre from the finish and stayed on strongly to win by one and a half lengths Dankaro, with Kamaraan and Mississipian in third and fourth.

Piggott reclaimed the ride from Paquet when Caracolero started 7/2 second favourite for the Irish Sweeps Derby at the Curragh on 29 June. Racing on firmer ground than he had previously encountered Caracolero reached fourth place early in the straight but then dropped away to finish eighth of the thirteen runners, almost twenty lengths behind the winner English Prince. Caracolero reportedly sustained an injury during the Irish Derby and never raced again.

== Stud record ==
Caracolero was retired from racing to become a breeding stallion at the Haras du Petit-Tellier in Argentan. He made little impact at studs and sired no winners of any importance. His last reported foals were born in 1988.

== Assessment ==
There was no International Classification of European two-year-olds in 1973: the official handicappers of Britain, Ireland and France compiled separate rankings for horses which competed in those countries. In the French Free Handicap Caracolero was rated thirteen pounds behind the top-rated Mississipian. In 1974 he was rated level with Dankaro as the best three-year-old colt in France, a pound behind the filly Comtesse de Loir. The independent Timeform organisation gave him a rating of 131, making him their top-rated three-year-old alongside Dankaro, Comtesse de Loir, Nonoalco and Sagaro.

== Breeding ==
Pedigree of Caracolero (USA), chestnut stallion, 1971
Sire Graustark (USA) 1963	Ribot (GB); 1952	Tenerani	Bellini
Sire Graustark (USA) 1963	Ribot (GB); 1952	Tenerani	Tofanella
Sire Graustark (USA) 1963	Ribot (GB); 1952	Romanella	El Greco
Sire Graustark (USA) 1963	Ribot (GB); 1952	Romanella	Barbara Burrini
Sire Graustark (USA) 1963	Flower Bowl (USA); 1952	Alibhai*	Hyperion*
Sire Graustark (USA) 1963	Flower Bowl (USA); 1952	Alibhai*	Teresina*
Sire Graustark (USA) 1963	Flower Bowl (USA); 1952	Flower Bed	Beau Pere
Sire Graustark (USA) 1963	Flower Bowl (USA); 1952	Flower Bed	Boudoir*
Dam Betty Loraine (USA) 1965	Prince John (USA); 1953	Princequillo	Prince Rose
Dam Betty Loraine (USA) 1965	Prince John (USA); 1953	Princequillo	Cosquilla
Dam Betty Loraine (USA) 1965	Prince John (USA); 1953	Not Afraid	Count Fleet
Dam Betty Loraine (USA) 1965	Prince John (USA); 1953	Not Afraid	Banish Fear
Dam Betty Loraine (USA) 1965	Gay Hostess (USA); 1957	Royal Charger	Nearco
Dam Betty Loraine (USA) 1965	Gay Hostess (USA); 1957	Royal Charger	Sun Princess
Dam Betty Loraine (USA) 1965	Gay Hostess (USA); 1957	Your Hostess	Alibhai*
Dam Betty Loraine (USA) 1965	Gay Hostess (USA); 1957	Your Hostess	Boudoir* (Family 4-d)

* Caracolero is inbred 3S x 4D to the stallion Alibhai, meaning that he appears third generation on the sire side of his pedigree and fourth generation on the dam side of his pedigree.

* Caracolero is inbred 4S x 4D to the mare Boudoir, meaning that she appears fourth generation on the sire side of his pedigree and fourth generation on the dam side of his pedigree.
