= Prix Matchem =

Flat horse race in France

- Class: Listed
- Location: Saint-Cloud; France
- Inaugurated: 1931
- Race type: Flat / Thoroughbred
- Website: france-galop.com

Race information
- Distance: 1,800 m (1.1 mi; 8.9 furlongs)
- Surface: Turf
- Track: Straight
- Qualification: Three-year-old colts and geldings excluding Group winners
- Weight: 56 kg Penalties; 2 kg for Listed winners * 2 kg if Group placed * * since January 1
- Purse: €55,000 (2017); 1st: €27,500

Prix Matchem
2024
Atlantic Coast	Elbaz	Zoum Zoum

Previous years
2023
Shalromy	Art Of Magic	Halfway Line
2022
Tribalist	American Kestrel	Anthorus
2021
Egot	Go Athletico	Djo Francais

2020-2011
2020
Alson	Real Force	Crew Dragon
2019
Matematica	Milord's Song	Firebird Song
2018
Spinning Memories	Mythical Magic	Spaday
2017
Uni	Franz Schubert	Temple Church
2016
Maximum Aurelius	Fourioso	Pagino
2015
Rickfield	Inordinate	Madrileno
2014
Guiliani	Nabbaash	Zuri Chop
2013
Pilote	Onedargent	Kapstadt
2012
Mainsail	Star On The Rocks	Moonday Sun
2011
Valiyr	Durer	Pine Creek

2010-2001
2010
Mellon Martini	Royal Revival	Ustilago
2009
Cavalryman	Cirrus Des Aigles	California Memory
2008
Blue Exit	Celebrissime	In Chambers
2007
Russian Desert	Gopher	Silverlord
2006
Viva Macau	Nordic Thunder	Kilometre Neuf
2005
Kocab	Athanor	Seulement
2004
Valixir	Red Tune	Nooska Tivoli
2003
Kiddy Sing	Marshall	Desert Swing
2002
Thattinger	Los Roques	Sharp Native
2001
Vahorimix	Green Jaro	Silver Seraph

2000-1999
2000
Darjeeling	Alyzig	Zaragozo
1999
Val Royal	Eighty Two	Leave Us Leap

The Prix Matchem is a Listed flat horse race in France open to three-year-old thoroughbred colts and geldings. It is run at Saint-Cloud over a distance of 1,800 m (1.1 mi; 8.9 furlongs), and it is scheduled to take place each year in October.

== History ==
The event was established in 1931, and it was originally held at Le Tremblay. It was initially the second leg of a two-part series called the Prix Biennal Herod-Matchem. The first leg, for two-year-olds, was the Prix Herod. The two parts were named after Herod and Matchem, foundation sires in the 18th century.

The Prix Matchem was transferred to Évry in the 1970s. For a period it took place in April or May, and its regular distance was 1,800 metres. It was cut to 1,600 metres in 1986, and restored to its previous length in 1990.

The race was switched to Chantilly in 1997, and to Maisons-Laffitte the following year. It began a longer spell at Chantilly in 1999, and returned to Maisons-Laffitte in 2002. It was extended to 2,100 metres in 2005, and from this point it was staged in late May or early June.

The Prix Matchem was contested over 2,000 metres at Compiègne in 2006 and 2007. It was run over 1,800 metres at Maisons-Laffitte in 2008, and over 2,000 metres at Saint-Cloud from 2009 to 2011. It reverted to 1,800 metres at Maisons-Laffitte in 2012.

== Records ==
Leading jockey since 1979 (7 wins):

- Olivier Peslier – Le Balafre (1993), Martiniquais (1996), Val Royal (1999), Vahorimix (2001), Thattinger (2002), Pilote (2013), Matematica (2019)

Leading trainer since 1979 (13 wins):

- André Fabre – Kitwood (1992), Bobinski (1995), Martiniquais (1996), Visionary (1997), Val Royal (1999), Vahorimix (2001), Kiddy Sing (2003), Valixir (2004), Kocab (2005), Russian Desert (2007), Cavalryman (2009), Pilote (2013), Alson (2020)

Leading owner since 1979 (4 wins):

- Jean-Luc Lagardère – Alzao (1983), Visionary (1997), Val Royal (1999), Vahorimix (2001)
- HH Aga Khan IV - Mourtazam (1981), Dilek (2006), Valiyr (2011), Rickfield (2015)

== Winners since 1979 ==
Year	Winner	Jockey	Trainer	Owner	Time
1979	Fabulous Dancer	Freddy Head	Criquette Head	Ghislaine Head	1:59.40
1980	Axius	Jean-Luc Kessas	J. M. de Choubersky	Emmeline de Waldner
1981	Mourtazam	Yves Saint-Martin	François Mathet	HH Aga Khan IV	1:59.10
1982	Bright Dick	Yves Saint-Martin	Joseph Audon	I. B. S. Lewin
1983	Alzao	Cash Asmussen	François Boutin	Jean-Luc Lagardère	2:01.00
1984	Greinton	Cash Asmussen	François Boutin	Stavros Niarchos	1:53.60
1985	Baillamont	Cash Asmussen	François Boutin	Stavros Niarchos
1986	Free Water	Freddy Head	François Boutin	Ernst Wiget
1987	Don Mario	Gary W. Moore	Criquette Head	Jacques Wertheimer
1988	Squill	Guy Guignard	Criquette Head	Etti Plesch	1:36.96
1989	Chivalrous	William Mongil	Alain de Royer-Dupré	Mrs Robert Bousquet
1990	Priolo	Gérald Mossé	François Boutin	Ecurie Skymarc Farm	1:50.00
1991	Sillery	Guy Guignard	Criquette Head	Ghislaine Head	1:58.09
1992	Kitwood	Thierry Jarnet	André Fabre	Sheikh Mohammed	1:52.88
1993	Le Balafre	Olivier Peslier	Nicolas Clément	Joseph de Lastours	1:56.86
1994	Dare and Go	Olivier Doleuze	Criquette Head	Jacques Wertheimer	2:01.80
1995	Bobinski	Thierry Jarnet	André Fabre	Bob McCreery	1:58.59
1996	Martiniquais	Olivier Peslier	André Fabre	Daniel Wildenstein	1:51.27
1997	Visionary	Thierry Jarnet	André Fabre	Jean-Luc Lagardère	1:52.30
1998	Frozen Groom	Olivier Doleuze	Criquette Head	Wertheimer et Frère	2:04.70
1999	Val Royal	Olivier Peslier	André Fabre	Jean-Luc Lagardère	1:53.10
2000	Darjeeling	Dominique Boeuf	Carlos Laffon-Parias	Javier Gispert	1:59.60
2001	Vahorimix	Olivier Peslier	André Fabre	Jean-Luc Lagardère	2:03.30
2002	Thattinger	Olivier Peslier	Richard Chotard	Guy-Roger Petit	1:54.10
2003	Kiddy Sing	Christophe Soumillon	André Fabre	Lagardère Family	1:56.90
2004	Valixir	Gary Stevens	André Fabre	Lagardère Family	1:55.80
2005	Kocab	Christophe Soumillon	André Fabre	Khalid Abdullah	2:31.30
2006	Dilek (Note: The 2006 winner Dilek was later exported to Hong Kong and renamed Viva Macau)	Christophe Soumillon	Alain de Royer-Dupré	HH Aga Khan IV	2:09.13
2007	Russian Desert	Stéphane Pasquier	André Fabre	Edouard de Rothschild	2:06.99
2008	Blue Exit	Christophe Lemaire	Jean-Claude Rouget	Allen / Tepper / Forgeard	1:51.70
2009	Cavalryman	Maxime Guyon	André Fabre	Sheikh Mohammed	2:08.60
2010	Mellon Martini	Gérald Mossé	Alain de Royer-Dupré	Almeida Camargo / Simon	2:08.20
2011	Valiyr	Christophe Lemaire	Alain de Royer-Dupré	HH Aga Khan IV	2:13.10
2012	Mainsail	Christophe Soumillon	Pascal Bary	Khalid Abdullah	1:51.42
2013	Pilote	Olivier Peslier	André Fabre	Wertheimer et Frère	1:52.90
2014	Guiliani	Maxime Guyon	Jean-Pierre Carvalho	Stall Ullmann	2:01.90
2015	Rickfield	Christophe Soumillon	Alain de Royer-Dupré	HH Aga Khan IV	1:54.10
2016	Maximum Aurelius	Pierre-Charles Boudot	Francis-Henri Graffard	Craig Mather	1:59.63
2017	Uni	Maxime Guyon	Fabrice Chappet	Haras d'Etreham & S Kumin	1:58.00
2018	Spinning Memories	Christophe Soumillon	Pascal Bary	Sutong Pan Racing	1:26.76
2019	Matematica	Olivier Peslier	Carlos Laffon-Parias	Wertheimer et Frère	1:29.76
2020	Alson	Pierre-Charles Boudot	André Fabre	Gestut Schlenderhan	1:30.52
2025	Temptable	Clement Lecoeuvre	Francis-Henri Graffard	Juddmonte	1:26.27

== Earlier winners ==
- 1931: Pulcherrimus
- 1932: Laeken
- 1933: Scolopax
- 1934: Antiochus
- 1935: Ipe
- 1936: Petit Jean
- 1937: Clairvoyant
- 1938: Castel Fusano
- 1939: Etalon Or
- 1947: Pearl Diver
- 1962: Violon d'Ingres
- 1963: Montsoreau
- 1974: Caracolero
- 1976: Exceller
- 1978: Dom Racine

== See also ==
- List of French flat horse races
