= Prix du Muguet =

Flat horse race in France

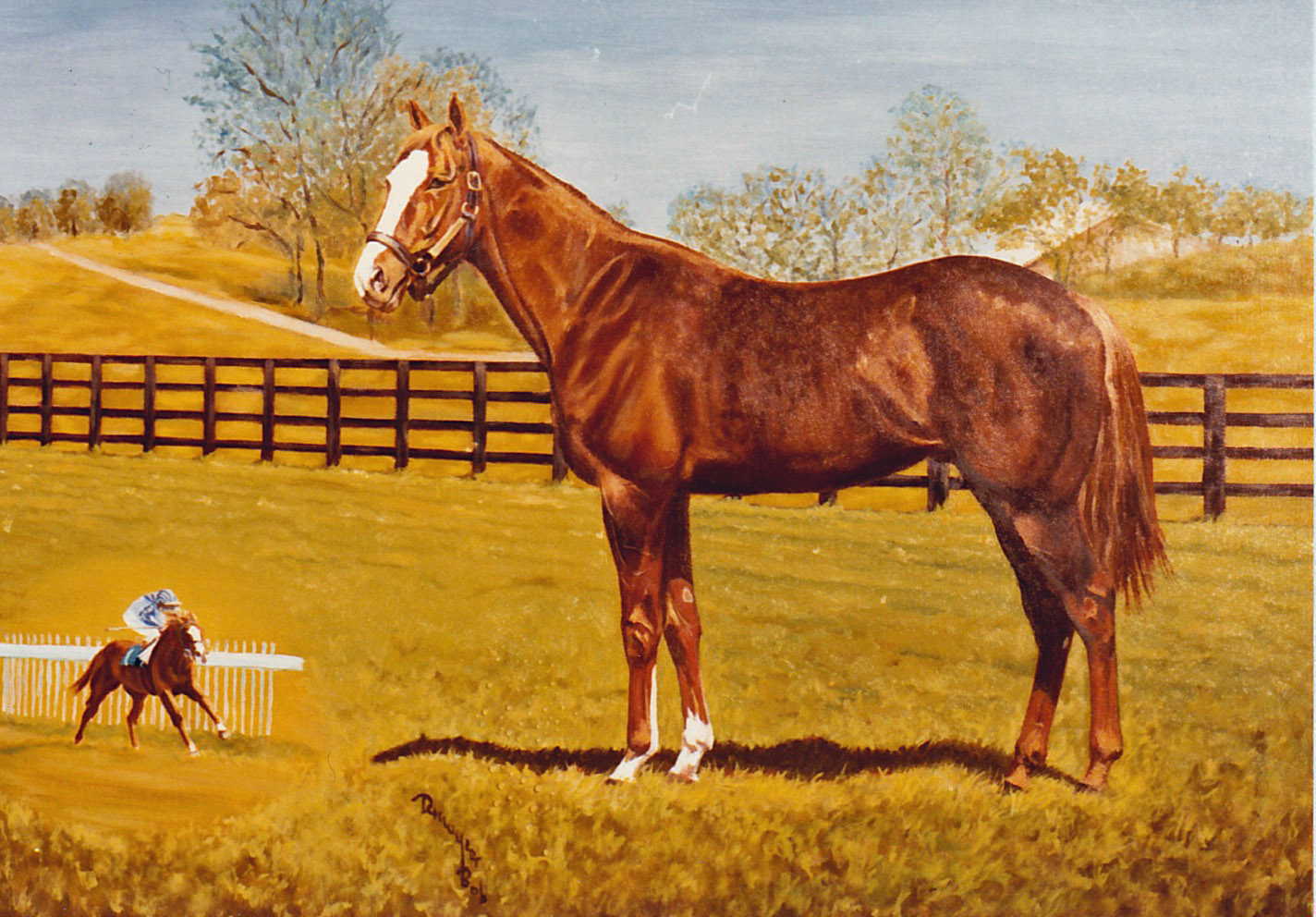
- Northjet, oil on canvas Painting by Bob Demuyser (1920–2003)
- Class: Group 2
- Location: Saint-Cloud Racecourse; Saint-Cloud, France
- Inaugurated: 1967
- Race type: Flat / Thoroughbred
- Website: france-galop.com

Race information
- Distance: 1,600 metres (1 mile)
- Surface: Turf
- Track: Left-handed
- Qualification: Four-years-old and up
- Weight: 57 kg Allowances; 1½ kg for fillies and mares Penalties; 3 kg for Group 1 winners * 1½ kg for Group 2 winners * * since 1 July last year
- Purse: €130,000 (2022); 1st: €74,100

Prix du Muguet
2025
Tribalist	Vertbois	Zoom

Previous years
2024
Tribalist	Marhaba Ya Sanafi	Dolayli
2023
Tribalist	Facteur Cheval	Erevann
2022
Sibila Spain	Dilawar	Hurricane Dream
2021
Duhail	Pretreville	Victor Ludorum

2020-2011
2020
Persian King	Pretreville	Skalleti
2019
Plumatic	Olmedo	Mer Et Nuages
2018
Recoletos	Jimmy Two Times	Taareef
2017
Jimmy Two Times	Kourkan	Usherette
2016
Vadamos	Ervedya	Mr Owen
2015
Bawina	Spoil The Fun	Esoterique
2014
Sommerabend	Matorio	Kokaltash
2013
Don Bosco	Sarkiyla	Sofast
2012
Zinabaa	No Risk At All	Evaporation
2011
Rajsaman	Byword	Sehrezad

2010–2001
2010
Byword	Gris De Gris	Sehrezad
2009
Vertigineux	Gris De Gris	Precious Boy
2008
Gris De Gris	Turfrose	Spirito Del Vento
2007
Racinger	Turtle Bowl	Passager
2006
Krataios	Kendor Dine	Svedov
2005
Martillo	Autumn Glory	Whipper
2004
Martillo	Sarre	Maxwell
2003
Dandoun	Domedriver	Bernebeau
2002
Keltos	Cornelius	Mahfooth
2001
Proudwings	Dionello	Berine's Son

2000–1998
2000
Dansili	Kingsalsa	Double Heart
1999
Gold Away	Lone Bid	Loudeac
1998
Marathon	Jim And Tonic	Keos

The Prix du Muguet is a Group 2 flat horse race in France open to thoroughbreds aged four years or older. It is run over a distance of 1,600 metres (about 1 mile) at Saint-Cloud in early May.

== History ==
The event is traditionally held at Saint-Cloud on 1 May, the French public holiday of Fête du Travail and Fête du Muguet. It is named after Muguet, the French word for the spring-flowering plant Lily of the Valley.

The Prix du Muguet was formerly a 2,000-metre race restricted to three-year-olds. The present version, a 1,600-metre race for older horses, was introduced in 1967. It was contested over 2,000 metres at Longchamp in 1968.

The race was not run in 1971, and it resumed with Group 3 status in 1972. It was absent again in 1974, and for a period thereafter it was sometimes staged at Longchamp (1976–77, 1982–83 and 1985).

The Prix du Muguet was promoted to Group 2 level in 1995.

== Records ==
Most successful horse (3 wins):

- Tribalist - 2023, 2024, 2025

Leading jockey (4 wins):

- Freddy Head – Ellora (1976), Northjet (1981), Pink (1985), Exit to Nowhere (1992)
- Olivier Peslier – Zabar (1994), Vetheuil (1996), Keltos (2002), Dandoun (2003)

Leading trainer (12 wins):

- André Fabre – Colour Chart (1991), Vetheuil (1996), Dansili (2000), Byword (2010), Vadamos (2016), Jimmy Two Times (2017), Plumatic (2019), Persian King (2020), Duhail (2021), Tribalist (2023, 2024, 2025)

Leading owner (5 wins):

- Godolphin – Jimmy Two Times (2017), Persian King (2020), Tribalist (2023, 2024, 2025)

== Winners since 1979 ==
Year	Winner	Age	Jockey	Trainer	Owner	Time
1979	Tarek	4	Henri Samani	Mitri Saliba	Mahmoud Fustok
1980	American Prince	4	Christy Roche	Stuart Murless	Burt Bacharach
1981	Northjet	4	Freddy Head	Olivier Douieb	Serge Fradkoff
1982	Schwepperusschian	5	Serge Gorli	Pierre Biancone	Georges Laporte
1983	Prospero	6	Claude Ramonet	C. Hervé	Mrs Sylvain Aknin
1984	Redmead	4	Cash Asmussen	François Boutin	Stavros Niarchos
1985	Pink	4	Freddy Head	Criquette Head	Jacques Wertheimer
1986	Apeldoorn	4	Maurice Philipperon	Philippe Barbe	Philippe Barbe
1987	Art Francais	4	Tony Cruz	Patrick Biancone	Daniel Wildenstein
1988	Pitchounet	4	Dominique Lawniczak	Albert Hosselet	Noël Pelat
1989	Gabina	4	Éric Legrix	J. C. Cunnington	Countess Batthyany	1:44.30
1990	Val des Bois	4	Guy Guignard	Criquette Head	Jacques Wertheimer	1:39.50
1991	Colour Chart	4	Steve Cauthen	André Fabre	Sheikh Mohammed	1:45.30
1992	Exit to Nowhere	4	Freddy Head	François Boutin	Stavros Niarchos	1:45.80
1993	Hatoof	4	Walter Swinburn	Criquette Head	Maktoum Al Maktoum	1:43.60
1994	Zabar	6	Olivier Peslier	Jonathan Pease	Gerald Leigh	1:42.10
1995	Green Tune	4	Olivier Doleuze	Criquette Head	Jacques Wertheimer	1:48.10
1996	Vetheuil	4	Olivier Peslier	André Fabre	Daniel Wildenstein	1:40.40
1997	Spinning World	4	Cash Asmussen	Jonathan Pease	Niarchos Family	1:43.80
1998	Marathon	4	Olivier Doleuze	Criquette Head	Alec Head	1:45.10
1999	Gold Away	4	Gérald Mossé	Criquette Head	Wertheimer et Frère	1:49.60
2000	Dansili	4	Christophe Soumillon	André Fabre	Khalid Abdullah	1:47.00
2001	Proudwings	5	Yutaka Take	Ralf Suerland	Hyperion Breeding	1:48.20
2002	Keltos	4	Olivier Peslier	Carlos Laffon-Parias	Tanaka / Marinopoulos	1:39.90
2003	Dandoun	5	Olivier Peslier	John Dunlop	Prince A. A. Faisal	1:42.70
2004	Martillo	4	William Mongil	Ralf Suerland	Gestüt Höny-Hof	1:36.40
2005	Martillo	5	Stéphane Pasquier	Ralf Suerland	Gestüt Höny-Hof	1:37.50
2006	Krataios	6	Miguel Blancpain	Carlos Laffon-Parias	Leonidas Marinopoulos	1:41.50
2007	Racinger	4	Frankie Dettori	Freddy Head	Pierre Goral	1:39.10
2008	Gris de Gris	4	Thierry Thulliez	Jean-Marc Capitte	Jean-Claude Seroul	1:40.60
2009	Vertigineux	5	Philippe Sogorb	Carole Dufrèche	C. & P. Dufrèche	1:37.90
2010	Byword	4	Maxime Guyon	André Fabre	Khalid Abdullah	1:39.50
2011	Rajsaman	4	Thierry Jarnet	Freddy Head	Saeed Al Romaithi	1:38.30
2012	Zinabaa	7	Yannick Letondeur	Michel Macé	Ecurie Victoria Dreams	1:39.80
2013	Don Bosco	6	Grégory Benoist	David Smaga	Omar El Sharif	1:39.00
2014	Sommerabend	7	Gérald Mossé	Mirek Rulec	Stall Am Alten	1:42.67
2015	Bawina	4	Maxime Guyon	Carlos Laffon-Parias	Wertheimer et Frère	1:40.86
2016	Vadamos	5	Pierre-Charles Boudot	André Fabre	Haras De Saint Pair	1:36.93
2017	Jimmy Two Times	4	Vincent Cheminaud	André Fabre	Godolphin	1:41.01
2018	Recoletos	4	Olivier Peslier	Carlos Laffon-Parias	Sarl Darpat France	1:42.49
2019	Plumatic	5	Vincent Cheminaud	André Fabre	Wertheimer et Frère	1:37.97
2020	Persian King (Note: The 2020 race was run in June due to the COVID-19 pandemic in France)	4	Pierre-Charles Boudot	André Fabre	Godolphin / Ballymore	1:39.09
2021	Duhail	5	Vincent Cheminaud	André Fabre	Al Shaqab Racing	1:36.75
2022	Sibila Spain	4	Aurelien Lemaitre	Christopher Head	Yeguada Centurion SL	1:41.84
2023	Tribalist	4	Mickael Barzalona	André Fabre	Godolphin	1:41.85
2024	Tribalist	5	Mickael Barzalona	André Fabre	Godolphin	1:39.10
2025	Tribalist	6	Mickael Barzalona	André Fabre	Godolphin	1:38.19
2026	No Lunch	5	Maxime Guyon	Christophe Ferland	Wertheimer et Frère	1:36.83

== Earlier winners ==
- 1967: Agy
- 1968: Frontal
- 1969: Prince Jet
- 1970: Regent Street
- 1971: no race
- 1972: Blinis
- 1973: Jan Ekels
- 1974: no race
- 1975: Brinkmanship
- 1976: Ellora
- 1977: Mittainvilliers
- 1978: Faraway Times

== See also ==
- List of French flat horse races
