= Greinton (horse) =

British-bred Thoroughbred racehorse

- Sire: Green Dancer
- Grandsire: Nijinsky
- Dam: Crystal Queen
- Damsire: High Top
- Sex: Stallion
- Foaled: 1981
- Country: Great Britain
- Colour: Bay
- Breeder: Stavros Niarchos
- Owner: 1) Stavros Niarchos; 2) Mary Jones Bradley, C. Whittingham, Howell Wynne
- Trainer: François Boutin (France); Charlie Whittingham (USA)
- Record: 22: 10-8-0
- Earnings: $1,940,087

Major wins
- Prix de Cabourg (1983); Prix Matchem (1984); Californian Stakes (1985); San Bernardino Handicap (1985); Hollywood Gold Cup (1985); Santa Anita Handicap (1986)

Greinton (March 5, 1981 – September, 2010) was a British-bred Thoroughbred racehorse who won on grass courses in France and set two track records on dirt at Hollywood Park Racetrack in the United States.

== Background ==
Greinton was bred by prominent Greek businessman and major horseracing owner/breeder, Stavros Niarchos. He was named for the village of Greinton in Somerset, England. He was trained in France by François Boutin.

== Racing career ==
=== European career ===
Greinton and made his racing debut on July 10, 1983 at Saint-Cloud Racecourse. Ridden by French-based American jockey Cash Asmussen, Geinton earned his first win then, with Asmussen aboard, made four more starts at age two and three, winning three and finishing second twice.

=== North American career ===
Stavros Niarchos sold Greinton in mid 1984 to American interests led by U.S. Racing Hall of Fame trainer, Charlie Whittingham. Based in California, his victories there included three Grade I races and he set new track records for 1 mile and 1¼ miles at Hollywood Park Racetrack.

With his victory aboard Greinton in the Hollywood Gold Cup on June 23, 1985, jockey Laffit Pincay Jr. became the second jockey in history to earn more than $100 million in career purses. Race caller Trevor Denman said that Greinton's 1986 Santa Anita Handicap victory was one of the most memorable races he has ever called. CalRacing.com – April 21, 2006

== Stud career ==
Retired to stud in the United States, in 1992 Geinton was purchased by Wolfgang Struebel owner of EPONA stud farm for his breeding operation in Germany. His offspring have met with modest success in racing. Until his death, Greinton was the fastest living miler and the oldest active stud in Europe.

He died September 2010 at Görlsdorf Stud, Germany, where he stood since 1996.
