= Casamento =

Irish-bred Thoroughbred racehorse

- Racing silks of Sheikh Mohammed and Godolphin
- Sire: Shamardal
- Grandsire: Giant's Causeway
- Dam: Wedding Gift
- Damsire: Always Fair
- Sex: Stallion
- Foaled: 20 March 2008
- Died: 21 February 2020 (aged 11)
- Country: Ireland
- Colour: Chestnut
- Breeder: D & J Cantillon and C & K Canning
- Owner: Sheikh Mohammed; Godolphin
- Trainer: Michael Halford; Mahmood Al Zarooni
- Record: 8: 4-1-0
- Earnings: £274,666

Major wins
- Beresford Stakes (2010); Racing Post Trophy (2010); Prix du Prince d'Orange (2011)

Casamento (20 March 2008 – 21 February 2020) was an Irish-bred Thoroughbred racehorse and sire. As a two-year-old in 2010 he was one of the best colts of his generation in Ireland, finishing second in the National Stakes before winning the Beresford Stakes and the Racing Post Trophy. In the following year his only win in four starts came in the Prix du Prince d'Orange. He was retired to stud at the end of the year having won four races in three countries from eight starts.

== Background ==
Casamento was a chestnut horse standing 16.1 hands high with a narrow white stripe bred in Ireland by D & J Cantillon and C & K Canning. He was from the second crop of foals sired by Shamardal whose wins included the Dewhurst Stakes, Poule d'Essai des Poulains, Prix du Jockey Club and St James's Palace Stakes. His other progeny have included Able Friend, Mukhadram and Lope de Vega. Casamento's dam Wedding Gift was a successful racemare who won the Listed Prix Saraca and finished third in both the Prix du Calvados and the Prix Vanteaux. She was descended from Vaguely Noble's half-sister Regal Lady.

As a foal in November 2008, Casamento was consigned by Tinnakill House to the sale at Goffs and was bought for €54,000 by the bloodstock agent Bobby O'Ryan. The colt entered the ownership of Sheikh Mohammed and was sent into training with Michael Halford at Kildangan, County Kildare.

== Racing career ==
=== 2010: two-year-old season ===
Casamento made his racecourse debut in a maiden race over seven and a half furlongs at Tipperary Racecourse on 28 August in which he was ridden by Gary Carroll who was able to claim a three-pound weight allowance as he had ridden less than 95 winners. Starting the 8/1 fourth choice in the betting in an eleven-runner field, he took the lead after a furlong and was never seriously challenged, winning "easily" by two and a half lengths from the Dermot Weld-trained Cannon Hill.

Sixteen days after his win at Tipperary, Casamento was moved up sharply in class for the Group One National Stakes over seven furlongs at the Curragh with Declan McDonogh taking over the ride. After taking an early lead he was overtaken by Pathfork two furlongs out but rallied strongly and was gaining on the leader in the closing stages before finishing second by a head. The Aidan O'Brien-trained favourite Zoffany was five lengths back in third place. Pat Smullen took over from McDonogh when the colt started 4/6 favourite for the Group Two Beresford Stakes over one mile at the Curragh on 26 September. His connections paid a supplementary entry fee of €10,000 as he had not been among the original entries for the race. The best-fancied of his six opponents were Mawaakef and Factum who had finished first and second in a maiden race at Killarney. After racing in second behind Robin Hood, Casamento took the lead a furlong and a half from the finish, quickly went clear of the field and won by four lengths from Mawaakef. After the race Halford said "he's still a big baby, but he's an exciting horse to have", whilst Smullen commented "he was very aggressive from the gate but I managed to get him some cover and he settled, which will serve him well for the future... he has the makings of a good one".

On his fourth and final appearance of the season Casamento was sent to England for the Group One Racing Post Trophy at Doncaster Racecourse, and again had a new jockey, with Frankie Dettori riding the colt. He was one of four Irish-trained challengers and made the 2/1 favourite ahead of the Anglesey Stakes winner Dunboyne Express (later to race with great success in Hong Kong under the name Dan Excel) whilst the Aidan O'Brien stable was represented by Master of Hounds and Seville. The most fancied of the six British trained runners were Titus Mills (Stardom Stakes) and Native Khan (Solario Stakes). Casamento raced behind the leaders before taking the lead two furlongs out and held off the sustained challenge of Sevile to win by three-quarters of a length with a gap of 2 1/2 lengths back to Master of Hounds in third. After the race Dettori commented "He's a lovely big horse with plenty of strength and a lot of presence. The race went as planned. I had watched videos of him and knew that he'd get the trip well, so about two-and-a-half furlongs out I let him go. We were in the middle and he idled before Seville came and his challenge helped me along". The colt's success gave Halford his first success at Group One level. The trainer said "It was a great performance and it all went like clockwork. He was idling in front a bit, but Frankie was always happy with him. He keeps finding and was only doing what he had to do".

Following his win at Doncaster, Casamento was taken into the ownership of Sheikh Mohammed's Godolphin organisation and was transferred to the stable Mahmood Al Zarooni. Commenting on the decision, Halford said "There was never any problem with that. It was always going to be the case and we were so lucky to get him. I'm so grateful to Sheikh Mohammed for sending me the horse in the first place".

=== 2011: three-year-old season ===
Casamento made his first appearance of 2011 in the 2000 Guineas over the Rowley Mile course at Newmarket Racecourse on 30 April and started 11/1 fourth choice in the betting behind Frankel, Pathfork and Roderic O'Connor. He chased Frankel in the early stages but dropped back soon after half way and finished tenth of the thirteen runners. The colt was then sent to France for the Prix du Jockey Club over 2000 metres at Chantilly Racecourse. He led the field into the straight but was overtaken 300 metres from the finish and faded into ninth place behind Reliable Man.

After a break of over three months, Casamento returned for the Group Three Prix du Prince d'Orange at Longchamp Racecourse on 17 September in which he was matched for the first time against older horses. Ridden for the first time by Mickael Barzalona he started a 9.3/1 outsider in a seven-runner field headed by the previously undefeated Desert Blanc and the Prix du Jockey Club runner-up Bubble Chic. The other runners included the Prix Guillaume d'Ornano runner-up Slow Pace, the Prix Omnium II winner Barocci and the Dr. Busch-Memorial winner Lindenthaler from Germany. Casmento raced at the rear of the field before switching to the outside to make his challenge in the straight. He overtook Barocci 50 metres from the finish and won "comfortably" by a length, with Desert Blanc a nose away in third. Casamento was moved back up into Group One class for his final race, the Champion Stakes over ten furlongs at Ascot Racecourse on 15 October. Starting a 25/1 outsider he was never in contention and finished eleventh of the twelve runners behind Cirrus des Aigles.

== Stud record ==
Casamento was retired from racing to become a breeding stallion at his owner's Dalham Hall Stud. His early progeny fetched some good prices at auction. He later spent a season in Sweden before moving tor the Sunnyhill Stud in County Kildare. In 2020 he was euthanized at Sunnyhill at the age of 12 after suffering a deterioration of a hoof condition.

The most successful of his offspring included Kings Will Dream (Turnbull Stakes), Communique (Princess of Wales's Stakes), Amade (Belmont Gold Cup Invitational Stakes), Princess Yaiza (Prix de Royallieu) and Lamaire (Oaks d'Italia).

== Pedigree ==
Pedigree of Casamento (IRE), chestnut horse, 2008
Sire Shamardal (USA) 2002	Giant's Causeway (USA); 1997	Storm Cat	Storm Bird
Sire Shamardal (USA) 2002	Giant's Causeway (USA); 1997	Storm Cat	Terlingua
Sire Shamardal (USA) 2002	Giant's Causeway (USA); 1997	Mariah's Storm	Rahy
Sire Shamardal (USA) 2002	Giant's Causeway (USA); 1997	Mariah's Storm	Immense
Sire Shamardal (USA) 2002	Helsinki (GB); 1993	Machiavellian	Mr. Prospector
Sire Shamardal (USA) 2002	Helsinki (GB); 1993	Machiavellian	Coup de Folie
Sire Shamardal (USA) 2002	Helsinki (GB); 1993	Helen Street	Troy
Sire Shamardal (USA) 2002	Helsinki (GB); 1993	Helen Street	Waterway
Dam Wedding Gift (FR) 1993	Always Fair (USA); 1985	Danzig	Northern Dancer
Dam Wedding Gift (FR) 1993	Always Fair (USA); 1985	Danzig	Pas de Nom
Dam Wedding Gift (FR) 1993	Always Fair (USA); 1985	Carduel	Buckpasser
Dam Wedding Gift (FR) 1993	Always Fair (USA); 1985	Carduel	MInstrelete
Dam Wedding Gift (FR) 1993	Such Style (GB); 1977	Sassafras	Sheshoon
Dam Wedding Gift (FR) 1993	Such Style (GB); 1977	Sassafras	Ruta
Dam Wedding Gift (FR) 1993	Such Style (GB); 1977	Regal Lady	Relko
Dam Wedding Gift (FR) 1993	Such Style (GB); 1977	Regal Lady	Noble Lassie (Family 1-d)
