= Prix de Cabourg =

- Class: Group 3
- Location: Deauville Racecourse; Deauville, France
- Inaugurated: 1921
- Race type: Flat / Thoroughbred
- Sponsor: Darley Racing
- Website: france-galop.com

Race information
- Distance: 1,200 metres (6f)
- Surface: Turf
- Track: Straight
- Qualification: Two-year-olds excluding Group 2 winners
- Weight: 56 kg Allowances; 1½ kg for fillies Penalties; 2 kg for Group 3 winners
- Purse: €56,000 (2020); 1st: €28,000

Prix de Cabourg
2024
Daylight	Polyvega	Columnist

Previous years
2023
Elite Status	Sajir	Havana Cigar
2022
The Antarctic	Manhattan Jungle	Kerindia
2021
Have A Good Day	Dizzy Bizu	Trident

2020-2011
2020
Cairn Gorm	Jubilation	Prince Lancelot
2019
Earthlight	Well Of Wisdom	Dubai Station
2018
Comedy	Kodyanna	We Go
2017
Tantheem	Darkanna	Mister Picnic
2016
Alrahma	Fixette	North Thunder
2015
Tourny	Du Pyla	Mont Kiara
2014
Ervedya	City Money	El Suizo
2013
My Catch	Al Muthana	Jally
2012
Mazameer	Baileys Jubilee	Pearl Flute
2011
Dabirsim	B Fifty Two	Chica Loca

2010–2001
2010
Pontenuovo	Captain Chop	Khawatim
2009
Zanzibari	Sorciere	Lixirova
2008
Silver Frost	Abbeyside	Madda's Force
2007
Alexandros	Stern Opinion	Wilki
2006
Out Of Time	Beta	Optari
2005
Mauralakana	Atlantic High	Mariol
2004
Layman	Inhabitant	Salut Thomas
2003
Denebola	Bonaire	Via Milano
2002
Loving Kindness	Together	Pleasure Place
2001
Firebreak	Flying Dash	Kithira

The Prix de Cabourg is a Group 3 flat horse race in France open to two-year-old thoroughbreds. It is run at Deauville over a distance of 1,200 metres (about 6 furlongs), and it is scheduled to take place each year in late July or early August.

== History ==
The event was created by the Société d'Encouragement in 1921. The organisation had taken over the duties of the Société des Courses de Deauville upon the death of its chairman Jacques Le Marois the previous year. The race was named after the nearby commune of Cabourg, and it was initially contested over 1,200 metres.

Deauville Racecourse was closed during World War II, and the Prix de Cabourg was not run from 1940 to 1945. It was cut to 900 metres in 1955, and its distance was frequently modified in the period thereafter. For brief spells it was contested over 1,000 metres (1956–57, 1961–64), 1,200 metres (1958–1960), 1,400 metres (1965–1970) and 1,300 metres (1971). Its present length, a return to 1,200 metres, was introduced in 1972.

For a period the Prix de Cabourg was classed at Listed level. It was promoted to Group 3 status in 1988.

== Records ==
Leading jockey (6 wins):

- Cash Asmussen – Greinton (1983), Gallanta (1984), Qirmazi (1989), Coup de Genie (1993), With Fascination (1995), Crystal Castle (2000)

Leading trainer (9 wins):

- François Boutin – Madedoine (1971), Zapoteco (1972), Super Concorde (1977), River Lady (1981), Greinton (1983), Gallanta (1984), Hector Protector (1990), Kenbu (1991), Coup de Genie (1993)

Leading owner (5 wins):

- Sheikh Mohammed – Qirmazi (1989), Tereshkova (1994), Layman (2004), Alexandros (2007), Zanzibari (2009)

== Winners since 1980 ==
Year	Winner	Jockey	Trainer	Owner	Time
1980	Prince Mab	Freddy Head	Alec Head	Jacques Wertheimer
1981	River Lady	Philippe Paquet	François Boutin	Stavros Niarchos
1982	Maximova	Freddy Head	Criquette Head	Haras d'Etreham
1983	Greinton	Cash Asmussen	François Boutin	Stavros Niarchos	1:14.90
1984	Gallanta	Cash Asmussen	François Boutin	Maria Niarchos	1:08.20
1985	Manific	Yves Saint-Martin	Robert Collet	Bendar bin M. Al Kabir	1:12.60
1986	Sakura Reiko	Éric Legrix	Patrick Biancone	Enshoku Zen	1:15.10
1987	First Waltz	Maurice Philipperon	Edouard Bartholomew	Sir Robin McAlpine	1:13.20
1988	Kendor	Tony Cruz	Raymond Touflan	Adolf Bader	1:14.80
1989	Qirmazi	Cash Asmussen	André Fabre	Sheikh Mohammed	1:13.20
1990	Hector Protector	Freddy Head	François Boutin	Stavros Niarchos	1:14.70
1991	Kenbu	Gérald Mossé	François Boutin	Tomohiro Wada	1:12.90
1992	Secrage	Bartolo Jovine	Fabio Brogi	General Horse Ad.	1:11.70
1993	Coup de Genie	Cash Asmussen	François Boutin	Stavros Niarchos	1:12.40
1994	Tereshkova	Thierry Jarnet	André Fabre	Sheikh Mohammed	1:10.80
1995	With Fascination	Cash Asmussen	Jonathan Pease	George Strawbridge	1:12.60
1996	Zamindar	Thierry Jarnet	André Fabre	Khalid Abdullah	1:12.60
1997	Xaar	Olivier Peslier	André Fabre	Khalid Abdullah	1:11.70
1998	Hunan	Walter Swinburn	Aidan O'Brien	Patrick Biancone	1:11.70
1999	Harbour Island	Thierry Jarnet	Pascal Bary	Ecurie J. L. Bouchard	1:12.10
2000	Crystal Castle	Cash Asmussen	John Hammond	John Raw	1:12.50
2001	Firebreak	Martin Dwyer	Ian Balding	Kennet Valley T'breds	1:12.90
2002	Loving Kindness	Thierry Thulliez	Pascal Bary	Niarchos Family	1:11.20
2003	Denebola	Thierry Thulliez	Pascal Bary	Niarchos Family	1:11.20
2004	Layman	Gary Stevens	André Fabre	Sheikh Mohammed	1:10.90
2005	Mauralakana	Frédéric Spanu	Jean-Claude Rouget	Maurice Hassan	1:12.50
2006	Out of Time	Olivier Peslier	Jean-Marie Sauvé	Maxime Jarlan	1:10.80
2007	Alexandros	Olivier Peslier	André Fabre	Sheikh Mohammed	1:13.90
2008	Silver Frost	Olivier Peslier	Yves de Nicolay	John D. Cotton	1:11.20
2009	Zanzibari	Maxime Guyon	André Fabre	Sheikh Mohammed	1:11.70
2010	Pontenuovo	Stéphane Pasquier	Yves de Nicolay	Erika Hilger	1:14.10
2011	Dabirsim	Philippe Sogorb	Christophe Ferland	Simon Springer	1:09.12
2012	Mazameer	Thierry Jarnet	Freddy Head	Hamdan Al Maktoum	1:09.30
2013	My Catch	Jamie Spencer	David Brown	Qatar Racing Limited	1:10.10
2014	Ervedya	Thierry Jarnet	Jean-Claude Rouget	HH Aga Khan	1:10.29
2015	Tourny	Grégory Benoist	Pascal Bary	Augustin-Normand / Vidal	1:09.01
2016	Alrahma	Aurelien Lemaitre	Freddy Head	Hamdan Al Maktoum	1:10.91
2017	Tantheem	Mickael Barzalona	Freddy Head	Hamdan Al Maktoum	1:10.85
2018	Comedy	Ben Curtis	Karl Burke	Keller, Redvers & Donald	1:10.82
2019	Earthlight	Mickael Barzalona	André Fabre	Godolphin	1:10.30
2020	Cairn Gorm	Tom Marquand	Mick Channon	Hunscote Stud Ltd & Ptnr	1:11.20
2021	Have A Good Day	Christophe Soumillon	Florian Guyader	Mrs Theresa Marnane	1:10.78
2022	The Antarctic	Ryan Moore	Aidan O'Brien	Magnier / Tabor / Smith / Westerberg / Brant	1:09.55

== Earlier winners ==
- 1921: Chloe
- 1922: Ganimede
- 1923: Cailis
- 1924: Le Bijou
- 1925: Take My Tip
- 1926: Beauclerc
- 1927: Ernagines
- 1928: Cordial
- 1929: Pearlash
- 1930: Sereno
- 1931: Le Becau
- 1932: Pick Up
- 1933: Sultano
- 1934: Ping Pong
- 1935: Pas Libre
- 1936: Galloway
- 1937: Arges
- 1938: Nord Express
- 1939: Floris
- 1940–45: no race
- 1946:
- 1947: Turmoil
- 1948: Dixmude
- 1949: Magnetron
- 1950: Galenite
- 1951: Elu
- 1952: Fort de France
- 1953: Beigler Bey
- 1954: Lightkeeper
- 1955: Djanet
- 1956: Turkrano
- 1957: Precieuse Ridicule
- 1958: Debut
- 1959: Tope La
- 1960: Jabbok
- 1961:
- 1962:
- 1963:
- 1964: Montagne
- 1965: Si Sage
- 1966:
- 1967: Soyeux
- 1968: Fast Ride
- 1969: Avon
- 1970: Sigisbee
- 1971: Madedoine
- 1972: Zapoteco
- 1973: Dankaro
- 1974: Tell Me Later
- 1975: Sharazar
- 1976: Adorant
- 1977: Super Concorde
- 1978: Lanngar
- 1979: This Man

== See also ==
- List of French flat horse races
