= Shamardal =

American-bred Thoroughbred racehorse

- Sire: Giant's Causeway
- Grandsire: Storm Cat
- Dam: Helsinki
- Damsire: Machiavellian
- Sex: Stallion
- Foaled: 27 March 2002
- Died: 16 April 2020 (aged 18)
- Country: United States
- Colour: Bay
- Breeder: Dr Phillip McCarthy, Fred Hertrich, John Fielding
- Owner: Richard Ketch (age 1 to 2); Abdulla Buhaleeba (lessee for first two races); Godolphin Racing
- Trainer: Mark Johnston; Saeed bin Suroor (at age 3)
- Record: 7: 6–0–0
- Earnings: £1,099,290

Major wins
- Vintage Stakes (2004); Dewhurst Stakes (2004); Poule d'Essai des Poulains (2005); Prix du Jockey Club (2005); St. James's Palace Stakes (2005)

Awards
- Cartier Champion Two-year-old Colt (2004); Timeform rating: 134
- Last updated on 1 May 2025

Shamardal (27 March 2002 – 16 April 2020) was an American-bred Thoroughbred racehorse who competed in the United Kingdom and in France. He was the 2004 European champion two-year-old and a double Classic winner aged three. He was also a successful sire.

== Background ==
Bred at Watercress Farm in Paris, Kentucky, Shamardal was sired by the 2000 European Horse of the Year, Giant's Causeway. He was out of the mare Helsinki, who had been only an average runner, but who was a full sister to Street Cry. Shamardal's damsire was Machiavellian, a son of the leading sire in North America, Mr. Prospector.

In November 2002, his breeders put him up for sale at the Keeneland Sales but when the bidding failed to meet their reserve price they decided to wait until the following year to auction him again. In early 2003, the yearling began to exhibit a subtle lack of coordination and an abnormal clumsiness in his gaits. He was soon diagnosed with a Grade 3 level of cervical vertebral malformation syndrome, a spinal disorder commonly referred to by horsemen as the "wobbles". The disease means the horse will likely never race and usually results in their having to be euthanized because their condition can cause them to collapse without warning that could result in severe injury to a handler. Shipped to specialists at Ohio State University, x-rays and a myelogram confirmed the condition. As such, his breeder/owners filed an insurance claim and turned ownership over to the insurance company where the colt became a standard case for euthanasia.

Richard Ketch, a former show horse trainer and farrier, became involved with the case as an adjuster for the insurers. As someone very familiar with the disease, he believed that there were alternative treatments that might save the colt's life. On Ketch's initiative, an agreement was reached with the insurance company to turn the colt over to him and his associate Herwig Schoen, a self-proclaimed "energy healer". Some call their treatment program "voodoo medicine", pointing out that research has shown that in about ten percent of these cases within twelve to fifteen months a horse will recover on its own. Nonetheless, under Ketch and his associates the colt made a full recovery.

Certified sound by multiple professionals, Ketch sent him to the October 2003 Tattersalls Houghton Yearling Sale at Newmarket in England where Sheikh Mohammed's Gainsborough Stud acquired the colt they would name Shamardal. However, the string of bad luck continued as he was sold for the very small price of 50,000 guineas after an endoscopic test of his breathing passages had erroneously diagnosed him as having breathing problems.

== Racing career ==
=== 2004: two-year-old season ===
Because the Maktoum family has such large worldwide racing stables, they sometimes follow the industry practice of leasing out some of their horses. Shamardal was one. Leased to businessman Abdulla Buhaleeba, the colt was prepared for racing by trainer Mark Johnston.

Shamardal first raced in 2004 at age two, winning a six-furlong maiden at Scotland's Ayr Racecourse in which he ran away from the field and won by eight lengths. He then was entered in the 28 July Group Two Vintage Stakes at Goodwood Racecourse in Chichester, England. He won that seven-furlong race by 2 1/2 lengths and in the process defeated Wilko, who went on to win that autumn's Breeders' Cup Juvenile in the United States. Following the race, the lease arrangement between Gainsborough Stud and Abdulla Buhaleeba was terminated for reasons that have never been made public.

Racing under the Gainsborough Stud banner, Shamardal ran into training problems that kept him out of racing until the 16 October Dewhurst Stakes at Newmarket Racecourse. In what is considered England's most important race for two-year-olds, Shamardal easily won the Group One event by 2 1/2 lengths. Undefeated after three races, he was voted the 2004 European Champion Two-Year-Old.

=== 2005: three-year-old season ===
Competing at age three under the Maktoum family's Godolphin Racing banner, Shamardal was conditioned by their head trainer, Saeed bin Suroor. The colt made his 2005 debut in the UAE Derby at Nad Al Sheba Racecourse in Dubai but performed poorly in his first race on dirt. Sent to France, where he was back on grass, under jockey Frankie Dettori he turned back several challenges in the straight while winning the Group One Poule d'Essai des Poulains at Longchamp Racecourse. He then captured the important Prix du Jockey Club, a Group One race he won by a head over Hurricane Run, a subsequent multiple Group one winning colt, who ran erratically in his run to the finish line.

Returned to England, as a dual-classic winner, for his next start at York Racecourse in June's St. James's Palace Stakes, Shamardal won his third Group One race of 2005 and the fourth of his career. While in training for his next scheduled start in the Eclipse Stakes, he fractured a front fetlock joint and was retired having never lost on the turf.

== Stud career ==
Shamardal stood at stud at Kildangan Stud in Ireland from 2006 until 2020, following an initial shuttle season in Australia in 2005. During his career, he sired approximately 1,758 named foals. His stud fee began at €40,000, remained at €50,000 for most of the 2010s, and reached €100,000 in his final seasons.

Over his 14–15 Northern Hemisphere seasons, he generated substantial stud revenue through selective but high-quality books (typically dozens to over 100 mares per year in peak demand), making him one of Darley's most profitable sires during that era. His success at stud is highlighted by 25–27 Group/Grade 1 winners (including stars such as Lope de Vega, Pinatubo, Blue Point, Tarnawa, Able Friend, Mukhadram, and Lumiere), multiple champions across continents, and a strong reputation as a sire of precocious juveniles and middle-distance talents. His influence continues through elite sons at stud and as a broodmare sire.

=== Major winners ===
c = colt, f = filly, g = gelding

Foaled	Name	Sex	Major wins
2006	Captain Sonador	c	Epsom Handicap
2007	Faint Perfume	f	Crown Oaks, Vinery Stud Stakes
2007	Lope de Vega	c	Poule d'Essai des Poulains, Prix du Jockey Club
2007	Zazou	c	Premio Roma
2008	Dan Excel	g	Champions Mile, Singapore Airlines International Cup
2008	Casamento	c	Racing Post Trophy
2008	Crackerjack King	c	Premio Presidente della Repubblica
2009	Able Friend	g	Hong Kong Mile, Stewards' Cup, Queen's Silver Jubilee Cup, Champions Mile
2009	Amaron	c	Premio Vittorio di Capua
2009	Maybe Discreet	f	Schweppes Oaks
2009	Mukhadram	c	Eclipse Stakes
2009	Sagawara	f	Prix Saint-Alary
2010	Baltic Baroness	f	Prix Vermeille
2011	Delectation	g	Darley Classic
2011	Ghibellines	c	Todman Stakes
2011	Tryster	g	Jebel Hatta
2012	Dariyan	c	Prix Ganay
2012	Speedy Boarding	f	Prix Jean Romanet, Prix de l'Opéra
2013	Lumiere	f	Cheveley Park Stakes
2013	Pakistan Star	g	Queen Elizabeth II Cup, Champions & Chater Cup
2014	Blue Point	c	King's Stand Stakes x2, Al Quoz Sprint, Diamond Jubilee Stakes
2015	Sheikha Reika	f	E. P. Taylor Stakes
2016	Castle Lady	f	Poule d'Essai des Pouliches
2016	Emaraaty Ana	g	Sprint Cup
2016	Tarnawa	f	Prix Vermeille, Prix de l'Opéra, Breeders' Cup Turf
2017	Earthlight	c	Prix Morny, Middle Park Stakes
2017	Pinatubo	c	Vincent O'Brien National Stakes, Dewhurst Stakes, Prix Jean Prat
2017	Victor Ludorum	c	Prix Jean-Luc Lagardère, Poule d'Essai des Poulains
2018	Royal Champion	g	Neom Turf Cup, Bahrain International Trophy
2021	Cinderella's Dream	f	Belmont Oaks, Falmouth Stakes
