= Earthlight (horse) =

Irish-bred Thoroughbred racehorse

- Racing silks of Godolphin
- Sire: Shamardal
- Grandsire: Giant's Causeway
- Dam: Winters Moon
- Damsire: New Approach
- Sex: Colt
- Foaled: 18 February 2017
- Country: Ireland
- Colour: Chestnut
- Breeder: Godolphin
- Owner: Godolphin
- Trainer: André Fabre
- Record: 9: 7-1-0
- Earnings: £491,280

Major wins
- Prix de Cabourg (2019); Prix Morny (2019); Middle Park Stakes (2019); Prix Kistena (2020); Prix du Pin (2020)

Earthlight (foaled 18 February 2017) is an Irish-bred, French-trained Thoroughbred racehorse. As a juvenile in 2019 he won two minor races before taking the Prix de Cabourg and then moving up to the highest class to win the Prix Morny and the Middle Park Stakes. In 2020 he won the Prix Kistena and the Prix du Pin as well as running fourth in the Prix Maurice de Gheest and second in the Prix de la Foret.

== Background ==
Earthlight is a chestnut colt with a broad white blaze and white socks on his hind legs bred in Ireland by Godolphin in whose blue colours he races. The colt was sent into training with André Fabre in France.

He was from the eleventh crop of foals sired by Shamardal whose wins included the Dewhurst Stakes, Poule d'Essai des Poulains, Prix du Jockey Club and St. James's Palace Stakes. His other offspring have included Able Friend, Mukhadram, Lope de Vega and Blue Point.

Earthlight is the first foal of his dam Winters Moon who won only one of her seven races but finished third in the Fillies' Mile and the Sweet Solera Stakes. Her dam Summertime Legacy won the Prix des Réservoirs and produced the Group 1 winners Wavering (Prix Saint-Alary) and Mandaean (Critérium de Saint-Cloud). She was a daughter of Zawaahy, a half-sister to Golden Fleece.

== Racing career ==
=== 2019: two-year-old season ===
Earthlight was ridden in all of his races as a two-year-old by Mickael Barzalona. On his racecourse debut the colt was made the 1.1/1 favourite for a maiden race over 1100 metres at Maisons-Laffitte Racecourse on 19 June and won by a neck from Dutch Chop with a gap of four and a half lengths back to the other eight runners. Two weeks later at Deauville Racecourse he started odds-on favourite for the five-runner Prix de Caen over 1200 metres. After settling in third place he went to the front 200 metres from the finish and drew away in the closing stages to win in "comfortable" style by three and a half lengths. On 28 July, over the same course and distance, Earthlight was stepped up in class for the Group 3 Prix de Cabourg and started 1.3/1 favourite against four opponents. He raced in fourth place before moving up to take the lead 200 metres out and won "readily" by four lengths from Well of Wisdom.

On 18 August at Deauville Earthlight started 2.4/1 second choice in the betting behind the filly Raffle Prize (winner of the Queen Mary Stakes and the Duchess of Cambridge Stakes) in the Group 1 Prix Morny. The other six runners included A'Ali (Norfolk Stakes, Prix Robert Papin), Arizona (Coventry Stakes), and Golden Horde (Richmond Stakes). After racing in mid-division as Raffle Prize set the pace, Earthlight moved up to challenge the favourite, gained the advantage in the last 200 metres and won by a neck. After the race André Fabre said that the colt would stay further and would probably be aimed at the 2000 Guineas.

On 28 September, Earthlight was sent to England to contest the Middle Park Stakes over six furlongs at Newmarket Racecourse and started the 11/4 favourite. His eight opponents included Mums Tipple (an eleven-length winner of his last race), Siskin (Phoenix Stakes), Threat (Champagne Stakes), Monarch of Egypt (runner-up in the Phoenix Stakes), Lope Y Fernandez (Round Tower Stakes) and Golden Horde. Siskin was withdrawn from the race after becoming unruly in the starting stalls. Earthlight started quickly but then settled in mid-division before making a sustained run in the last quarter mile. He got the better of Golden Horde inside the final furlong and won by a neck with third and fourth places going to the outsiders Summer Sands and King Neptune.

In the official rating of European two-year-olds for 2019 Earthlight was rated the second-best juvenile of the year, level with Kameko but ten pounds inferior to Pinatubo.

=== 2020: three-year-old season ===
Earthlight was expected to begin his second campaign in the Prix de Fontainebleau at Longchamp on 11 May, the day on which racing resumed in France after the COVID-19 outbreak lockdown. On 6 May however it was announced that the colt would miss the race after sustaining a sprained fetlock in training. The colt made a belated seasonal debut in the Listed Prix Kistena over 1200 metres at Deauville on 12 July and started the 2/5 favourite against seven opponents. He took the lead 400 metres from the finish and drew away to win by two and a half lengths from Wanaway. Four weeks later the colt started favourite for the Group 1 Prix Maurice de Gheest over 1300 metres at the same track. He was in contention from the start and disputed the lead in the closing stages but was outpaced in the closing stages and sustained his first defeat as he came home fourth behind Space Blues, Hello Youmzain and Lope Y Fernadez, beaten a length by the winner. On 13 September Earthlight was dropped back to Group 3 class for the Prix du Pin over 1400 metres at Longchamp Racecourse. Starting the odds on favourite he raced in mid-division before taking the lead 100 metres from the finish and winning "a shade cosily" by three quarters of a length from the Prix de la Grotte winner Tropbeau. On his final racecourse appearance Earthlight started the 1.4/1 favourite for the Group 1 Prix de la Foret over 1400 metres at Longchamp on 4 October. He took the lead after 300 metres and maintained his advantage for most of the way before being overtaken in the closing stages and beaten a neck into second place by the six-year-old mare One Master.

== Stud career ==
Nine days after his run in the Prix de la Foret it was announced that Earthlight had been retired from racing and would start his stud career at the Kildangan Stud in 2021.

=== Notable progeny ===
c = colt, f = filly, g = gelding
bold = grade 1 stakes

**Foaled**	**Name**	**Sex**	**Major wins**
2022	King Of Light	g	WA Guineas, Eurythmic Stakes, Lee Steere Stakes

== Pedigree ==
Pedigree of Earthlight (IRE), chestnut colt, 2017
Sire Shamardal (USA) 2002	Giant's Causeway; 1997	Storm Cat	Storm Bird (CAN)
Sire Shamardal (USA) 2002	Giant's Causeway; 1997	Storm Cat	Terlingua
Sire Shamardal (USA) 2002	Giant's Causeway; 1997	Mariah's Storm	Rahy
Sire Shamardal (USA) 2002	Giant's Causeway; 1997	Mariah's Storm	Immense
Sire Shamardal (USA) 2002	Helsinki (GB); 1993	Machiavellian (USA)	Mr. Prospector
Sire Shamardal (USA) 2002	Helsinki (GB); 1993	Machiavellian (USA)	Coup de Folie
Sire Shamardal (USA) 2002	Helsinki (GB); 1993	Helen Street	Troy
Sire Shamardal (USA) 2002	Helsinki (GB); 1993	Helen Street	Waterway (FR)
Dam Winters Moon (IRE) 2012	New Approach (IRE); 2005	Galileo	Sadler's Wells (USA)
Dam Winters Moon (IRE) 2012	New Approach (IRE); 2005	Galileo	Urban Sea (USA)
Dam Winters Moon (IRE) 2012	New Approach (IRE); 2005	Park Express	Ahonoora (GB)
Dam Winters Moon (IRE) 2012	New Approach (IRE); 2005	Park Express	Matcher (CAN)
Dam Winters Moon (IRE) 2012	Summertime Legacy (GB); 1999	Darshaan	Shirley Heights
Dam Winters Moon (IRE) 2012	Summertime Legacy (GB); 1999	Darshaan	Delsy (FR)
Dam Winters Moon (IRE) 2012	Summertime Legacy (GB); 1999	Zawaahy (USA)	El Gran Senor
Dam Winters Moon (IRE) 2012	Summertime Legacy (GB); 1999	Zawaahy (USA)	Exotic Treat (Family: 8-c)
