= Helen Street =

British Thoroughbred racehorse

- Sire: Troy
- Grandsire: Petingo
- Dam: Waterway
- Damsire: Riverman
- Sex: Mare
- Foaled: 4 April 1982
- Died: 20 April 2005 (aged 23)
- Country: United Kingdom
- Colour: Bay
- Breeder: Ballymacoll Stud
- Owner: Arnold Weinstock & Michael Sobell
- Trainer: Dick Hern
- Record: 10: 3-1-2

Major wins
- Prix du Calvados (1984); Irish Oaks (1985)

Awards
- Top-rated British-trained 2-year-old filly (1984); Timeform rating: 114 p (1984), 123 (1985)

Helen Street (4 April 1982 – 20 April 2005) was a British Thoroughbred racehorse and broodmare. As a two-year-old she was rated the best British-trained filly of her generation after winning the Prix du Calvados and finishing second under top weight in the Fillies' Mile. In the following year she was a top-class performer over middle distances, winning the Irish Oaks, finishing third in the Yorkshire Oaks and fourth in both the Champion Stakes and the Washington, D.C. International Stakes. After her retirement from racing she had a successful career a broodmare, producing Street Cry and Helsinki, the dam of Shamardal.

== Background ==
Helen Street was a "big, rangy, quite attractive" bay mare with a small white star bred and owned by Arnold Weinstock and Michael Sobell of the Ballymacoll Stud. She was sent into training with Dick Hern at West Ilsley in Berkshire.

She was from the second of four crops of foals sired by Troy, an outstanding middle-distance performer who won The Derby, Irish Derby, King George VI and Queen Elizabeth Stakes and International Stakes in 1979. Troy died in 1983, a year before Helen Street began her racing career. Her dam Waterway was a very good racemare (rated 112 by Timeform) who won the Prix du Calvados and finished third to Three Troikas in the Poule d'Essai des Pouliches. She was descended from the influential British broodmare Sunny Gulf who was the female-line ancestor of numerous major winners including Sun Princess, Conduit, Neo Universe, Millenary, Petrushka and Spectrum.

== Racing career ==
=== 1984: two-year-old season ===
Helen Street made her racecourse debut in the Virginia Water Stakes, for previously unraced fillies over six furlongs at Ascot Racecourse in July. She won by a neck from the Henry Cecil-trained Batave, with a gap of seven lengths back to the other eight runners. In the following month the filly was sent to France and stepped up in class and distance to contest the Group 3 Prix du Calvados (a race which her mother had won in 1978) over 1400 metres at Deauville Racecourse. Ridden by Willie Carson she started favourite against seven opponents headed by the Prix Yacowlef winner Breath Taking. she tracked the leader Exgravity before going to the front at half way and drawing clear in the closing stages to win by a "long-looking" three lengths from Elisharp and Northern Walker. The form of the race was subsequently franked when Northern Walker finished second, beaten less than a length, in the Group 1 Prix de la Salamandre.

Helen Street returned to England for the Fillies' Mile at Ascot in September in which, as a Group race winner, she was required to concede weight to her seven opponents. She made steady progress in the straight but was beaten one and a half lengths by the favourite Oh So Sharp, who was carrying four pounds less.

=== 1985: three-year-old season ===
On her first appearance as a three-year-old Helen Street contested the Nell Gwyn Stakes (a trial for the 1000 Guineas) over even furlongs at Newmarket on 18 April and finished third behind Oh So Sharp and Bella Colora. She was then stepped up in distance for the Musidora Stakes (a trial for The Oaks) at York Racecourse on 14 May. She started 2/1 favourite but after having trouble obtaining a clear run she finished fourth behind Fatah Flare, Dubian and Ever Genial. Despite her two defeats she was still strongly fancied when she was sent to Ireland to contest the Irish Oaks over one and a half miles at the Curragh on 13 July. Dubian, who had finished third to Oh So Sharp and Triptych in the Epsom Oaks started favourite ahead of Sally Brown with Helen Street next in the betting on 3/1. The only other fillies given any chance in the nine-runner field were Alydar's Best (winner of the Grand Critérium) and Fair of the Furze. After restraining his mount at the rear of the field Carson switched Helen Street to the outside to make her challenge in the straight. She took the lead entering the last quarter mile and drew away in the closing stages to win by two and a half lengths from Alydar's Best with Dubian taking third ahead of Sally Brown.

On 20 August Helen Street started the 8/11 favourite for the Yorkshire Oaks but was beaten in a close finish as she took third, three quarters of a length and a head behind Sally Brown and Kiliniski. In her three remaining races the filly was matched against top-class male opposition in major weight-for-age races. In the Irish Champion Stakes at Phoenix Park Racecourse on 8 September she reached fourth place early in the straight but then looked outpaced and finished sixth behind Commanche Run, Bob Back, Damister, Scottish Reel and Baillamont with Theatrical in seventh and Triptych tenth of the eleven runners. On her final European start, Helen Street was one of ten horses to contest an exceptionally strong renewal of the Champion Stakes at Newmarket on 19 October, and finished fourth behind Pebbles, Slip Anchor and Palace Music. Helen Street ended her racing career with a trip to the United States for the Washington, D.C. International Stakes at Laurel Park on 16 November. Starting a 19.5/1 outsider she stayed on well in the stretch and finished fourth behind Vanlandingham, Yashgan and Jupiter Island, beaten two and a quarter lengths by the winner.

== Assessment ==
In 1984 the independent Timeform organisation gave her a rating of 114 p (the "p" indicating that she was likely to make more than usual progress), making her 11 pounds inferior to their best two-year-old filly Triptych. In the official International classification she was rated the third best juvenile filly in Europe behind Triptych and the Irish-trained Park Appeal. In the following year she was rated 123 by Timeform, eight pounds behind their best three-year-old filly Oh So Sharp. In the International classification she was rated the tenth-best three-year-old filly in Europe eleven pounds behind Oh So Sharp.

== Breeding record ==
At the end of her racing career Helen Street was acquired by Sheikh Mohammed and was retired to become a broodmare. She produced at least thirteen foals and ten winners between 1987 and 2004:

- Ilia, a bay filly, foaled in 1987, sired by Shadeed. Unraced.
- Helenus, bay colt (later gelded), 1988, by Danzig. Failed to win in nine races.
- Mount Helena, bay filly, 1989, by Danzig. Won one race.
- Sovetsky, chestnut colt (gelded), 1990, by Soviet Star. Won two races over hurdles.
- Grecian Slipper, bay filly, 1991, by Sadler's Wells. Won three races.
- Varvarka, bay filly, 1992, by Soviet Star. Won one race.
- Helsinki, bay filly, 1993, by Machiavellian. Won one race. Dam of Shamardal.
- Helehenberg, bay colt (gelded), 1997, by Shareef Dancer. Won one race.
- Street Cry, dark bay or brown colt, 1998, by Machiavellian. Won five races including Dubai World Cup. Sire of Street Sense and Winx.
- Historian, brown filly, 1999, by Pennekamp. Won three races including Listed Prix Rose de Mai.
- Street Light (AKA Streetlight), bay colt, 2001, by Polish Precedent. Unraced.
- River Street, chestnut filly, 2002, by Machiavellian. Wone one race.
- Street Talk, bay colt (gelded), 2004, by Machiavellian. Won one race.

== Pedigree ==
Pedigree of Helen Street (GB), bay mare, 1982
Sire Troy (GB) 1976	Petingo (GB); 1965	Petition	Fair Trial
Sire Troy (GB) 1976	Petingo (GB); 1965	Petition	Art Paper
Sire Troy (GB) 1976	Petingo (GB); 1965	Alcazar	Alycidon
Sire Troy (GB) 1976	Petingo (GB); 1965	Alcazar	Quarterdeck
Sire Troy (GB) 1976	La Milo (GB); 1963	Hornbeam	Hyperion
Sire Troy (GB) 1976	La Milo (GB); 1963	Hornbeam	Thicket
Sire Troy (GB) 1976	La Milo (GB); 1963	Pin Prick	Pinza
Sire Troy (GB) 1976	La Milo (GB); 1963	Pin Prick	Miss Winston
Dam Waterway (FR) 1976	Riverman (USA); 1969	Never Bend	Nasrullah
Dam Waterway (FR) 1976	Riverman (USA); 1969	Never Bend	Lalun
Dam Waterway (FR) 1976	Riverman (USA); 1969	River Lady	Prince John
Dam Waterway (FR) 1976	Riverman (USA); 1969	River Lady	Nile Lily
Dam Waterway (FR) 1976	Boulevard (IRE); 1968	Pall Mall	Palestine
Dam Waterway (FR) 1976	Boulevard (IRE); 1968	Pall Mall	Malapert
Dam Waterway (FR) 1976	Boulevard (IRE); 1968	Costa Sola	Worden
Dam Waterway (FR) 1976	Boulevard (IRE); 1968	Costa Sola	Sunny Cove (Family: 1-l)
