= Furry Glen =

Irish-bred Thoroughbred racehorse

- Sire: Wolver Hollow
- Grandsire: Sovereign Path
- Dam: Cleftess
- Damsire: Hill Gail
- Sex: Stallion
- Foaled: 6 February 1971
- Country: Ireland
- Colour: Bay
- Breeder: James Geraghty
- Owner: Seamus McGrath
- Trainer: Seamus McGrath
- Record: 12: 5-2-2

Major wins
- Marble Hill Stakes (1973); Mullion Stakes (1973); Irish 2000 Guineas (1974); Whitehall Stakes (1974)

Awards
- Timeform rating 113 (1973), 121 (1974)

Furry Glen (6 February 1971 – 1987) was an Irish Thoroughbred racehorse and sire. He was one of the best Irish two-year-old of 1973 when he won the Marble Hill Stakes and the Mullion Stakes as well as finishing third in the Coventry Stakes. In the following year, he was narrowly beaten in the Vauxhall Trial Stakes before recording his biggest success in the Irish 2000 Guineas. He was beaten in his next three races when tried over longer distances before ending his career with a win in the Whitehall Stakes. After he retired from racing, he became a very successful sire of National Hunt horses.

== Background ==
Furry Glen was a "big, strong, lengthy" bay horse with no white markings bred in Ireland by James Geraghty. He was sold as a foal for 3,500 guineas and then returned to the sales as a yearling when he fetched 14,000 guineas. He entered the ownership of Seamus McGrath who also trained him during his racing career. He was named after an area in the south-western corner of Phoenix Park.

He was from the first crop of foals sired Wolver Hollow who won the 1969 Eclipse Stakes and went on to become a successful breeding stallion with his other progeny including Wollow. His dam Cleftess was an unraced daughter of the Kentucky Derby winner Hill Gail.

== Racing career ==
=== 1973: two-year-old season ===
After finishing unplaced on his racecourse debut over five furlongs, Furry Glen won a maiden race over the same distance at the Curragh. He was then moved up in class and distance for the Marble Hill Stakes over six furlongs at the same course and won impressively from a field which included six previous winners. In June he was sent to England to contest the Coventry Stakes at Royal Ascot and finished third behind Doleswood and Dragonara Palace. In August he started 2/5 favourite for the Mullion Stakes over seven furlongs at Leopardstown Racecourse and won by one and a half lengths from Wanlockhead. In September he started favourite for the Larkspur Stakes over the same course and distance and finished third behind Primed and Sir Penfro.

=== 1974: three-year-old season ===
On his three-year-old debut, Furry Glen contested the Group Three Vauxhall Trial Stakes over seven furlongs at Phoenix Park Racecourse, and finished second, beaten a head by the Vincent O'Brien-trained Cellini, the winner of the 1973 Dewhurst Stakes. The Irish 2000 Guineas, run on soft ground at the Curragh on 18 May attracted a field of ten runners. Cellini started favourite ahead of the British challenger's Welsh Harmony (Horris Hill Stakes) and Pitcairn (Blue Riband Trial Stakes) with Furry Glen, ridden by George McGrath starting the 10/1 fourth choice in the betting. Furry Glen was last of the ten runners at halfway and appeared to have no chance of winning but then began to stay on strongly on the outside. He caught the leader Pitcairn in the final strides and won by a short head, with a gap of three lengths back to Cellini in third.

Furry Glen was moved up in the distance for the Gallinule Stakes over ten furlongs at the Curragh later in May but was beaten a short head by Sir Penfro. Despite his defeat, he was stepped up in the distance again for the Irish Derby over one and a half miles on 29 June. He lost any chance he may have had when he was badly hampered in the straight and finished seventh, more than fifteen lengths behind the winner English Prince. On his next appearance in August, Furry Glen was most disappointing when coming home fifth behind Richard Grenville in the Blandford Stakes at the Curragh. On his final start, the colt was dropped back in the distance for the Whitehall Stakes over nine furlongs at Phoenix Park and won by a short head from the filly Leave It To Me, to whom he was conceding thirteen pounds.

== Assessment ==
There was no International Classification of European two-year-olds in 1973: the official handicappers of Britain, Ireland and France compiled separate rankings for horses which competed in those countries. In the Irish Free Handicap, Furry Glen was assigned a weight of 133 pounds, placing him fourth behind Apalachee, Cellini and Saritamer. The independent Timeform organisation gave him a rating of 113, 24 pounds below their top-rated two-year-old Apalachee.

In 1974 he was given a rating of 121 by Timeform, ten pounds behind their top-rated three-year-old colts Caracolero, Dankaro, Nonoalco and Sagaro.

== Stud record ==
Furry Glen was retired from racing to become a breeding stallion, beginning his stud career at the Ballymaglasson Stud in County Meath at a fee of £500.

He had little success as a sire of runners on the flat but was very successful National Hunt stallion. His best winners included Big Matt (Victor Chandler Chase), Change The Act (Tolworth Hurdle), Commercial Artist (Ericsson Chase), Danny Connors (Coral Golden Hurdle Final), Shannon Glen (Mumm Prize Novices' Hurdle), Strath Royal (Charlie Hall Chase), Super Tactics (Racing Post Chase), Toby Tobias (Martell Cup), Triple Witching (Long Distance Hurdle) and Vicario de Bray (Champion Hurdle Trial).

Furry Glen died in 1987 at the age of 16.

== Pedigree ==
Pedigree of Furry Glen (IRE), bay stallion, 1971
Sire Wolver Hollow (GB) 1964	Sovereign Path (GB); 1956	Grey Sovereign	Nasrullah
Sire Wolver Hollow (GB) 1964	Sovereign Path (GB); 1956	Grey Sovereign	Kong
Sire Wolver Hollow (GB) 1964	Sovereign Path (GB); 1956	Mountain Path	Bobsleigh
Sire Wolver Hollow (GB) 1964	Sovereign Path (GB); 1956	Mountain Path	Path of Peace
Sire Wolver Hollow (GB) 1964	Cygnet (GB); 1950	Caracalla	Tourbillon
Sire Wolver Hollow (GB) 1964	Cygnet (GB); 1950	Caracalla	Astronomie
Sire Wolver Hollow (GB) 1964	Cygnet (GB); 1950	Mrs Swan Song	Sir Walter Raleigh
Sire Wolver Hollow (GB) 1964	Cygnet (GB); 1950	Mrs Swan Song	Donati's Comet
Dam Cleftess (GB) 1956	Hill Gail (USA); 1949	Bull Lea	Bull Dog
Dam Cleftess (GB) 1956	Hill Gail (USA); 1949	Bull Lea	Rose Leaves
Dam Cleftess (GB) 1956	Hill Gail (USA); 1949	Jane Gail	Blenheim
Dam Cleftess (GB) 1956	Hill Gail (USA); 1949	Jane Gail	Lady Higloss
Dam Cleftess (GB) 1956	Cleft (GB); 1946	Lighthouse	Pharos
Dam Cleftess (GB) 1956	Cleft (GB); 1946	Lighthouse	Pyramid
Dam Cleftess (GB) 1956	Cleft (GB); 1946	Rift	Solario
Dam Cleftess (GB) 1956	Cleft (GB); 1946	Rift	Pilgrim's Rest (Family: 8-d)
