= Habat =

Irish-bred Thoroughbred racehorse

- Sire: Habitat
- Grandsire: Sir Gaylord
- Dam: Atrevida
- Damsire: Sunny Boy
- Sex: Stallion
- Foaled: 1971
- Country: Ireland
- Colour: Grey
- Breeder: Marston Stud
- Owner: Carlo Vittadini
- Trainer: Peter Walwyn
- Record: 10: 5-2-0

Major wins
- Norfolk Stakes (1973); Mill Reef Stakes (1973); Middle Park Stakes (1974); 2,000 Guineas Trial Stakes (1974)

Awards
- Top-rated British two-year-old (1973); Timeform rating 127 (1973), 121 (1974)

Habat (25 January 1971 – 12 January 1994) was an Irish-bred, British-trained Thoroughbred racehorse and sire. He was the top-rated British two-year-old of his generation in 1973 when he won four of his six races including the Norfolk Stakes, Mill Reef Stakes and Middle Park Stakes. He won the 2,000 Guineas Trial Stakes on his three-year-old debut but was beaten in his three subsequent races and was retired at the end of the season. He stood as a breeding stallion in Britain and Japan with limited success.

== Background ==
Habat was a "handsome, shapely, imposing" grey horse bred by the Marston Stud. He was from the first crop of foals sired by Habitat, an American-bred, British-raced miler who became one of the leading European stallions of the 1970s and 1980s. His other progeny included Habibti, Flying Water, Marwell, Rose Bowl and Steinlen and he was the British Champion broodmare sire on three occasions. Habat's dam Atrevida showed high class form as a racehorse, finishing third in the Irish 1000 Guineas in 1961 and was a daughter of the sprinting mare Palariva, whose wins included the King's Stand Stakes. Palariva was a granddaughter of the outstanding broodmare Mumtaz Begum, the ancestor of numerous major winners including Nasrullah and Shergar.

As a yearling Habat was offered for sale and bought for 14,500 guineas by the bloodstock agent Keith Freeman. He entered the ownership of the Italian Carlo Vittadini and was sent into training with Peter Walwyn at his stable at Seven Barrows near Lambourn in Berkshire.

== Racing career ==
=== 1973: two-year-old season ===
Habat began his racing career in the Portsmouth Road Plate over five furlongs at Kempton Park Racecourse in May. He opened up a clear lead over his rivals but then began to show his lack of experience and was caught in the final stride and beaten a head by Dragonara Palace. The winner went on to take the July Stakes and the Richmond Stakes later that year. Two weeks later, on 13 June, Habat started odds-on favourite for the Berkshire Stakes at Newbury Racecourse and won "cantering" by five lengths. At Royal Ascot later that month the colt was ridden by Pat Eddery when he started the 7/4 favourite for the Norfolk Stakes over five furlongs. Habat joined the leaders in the last quarter mile before going clear approaching the final furlong and winning impressively by six lengths from Red Alert. The colt was then sent to France for the Prix Robert Papin over 1100 metres at Maisons-Laffitte Racecourse on 29 July. He started favourite but finished sixth of the eleven runners behind the filly Lianga.

After a break of six weeks, Habat returned and was moved up in distance for the Mill Reef Stakes over six furlongs at Newbury in September. He was made the 10/11 favourite ahead of five opponents headed by the sprinter Bay Express. He was restrained by Eddery in the early stages before taking the lead a furlong out and drawing away to win by five lengths from the Dick Hern-trained Boldini. In October Habat was moved up to Group One class for the Middle Park Stakes at Newmarket Racecourse and started the 4/6 favourite. Pitcairn set a very strong pace from The Blues as Habat tracked the leaders along the rail. Approaching the final furlong, Habat was switched to the outside, took the lead, and drew away in the closing stages to win by two and a half lengths from Pitcairn, with three lengths back to Boots Green in third.

=== 1974: three-year-old season ===
Habat started his second season in the 2000 Guineas Trial Stakes at Ascot on 6 April. Starting odds-on favourite he had some problems obtaining a clear run in the closing stages before accelerating clear to win from Talk of the Town. In a strong field for the 2000 Guineas over Newmarket's Rowley Mile course, he was made the 9/1 second favourite but finished sixth of the twelve runners behind Nonoalco, Giacometti, Apalachee, Northern Taste and Welsh Harmony. Plan to run the colt in the St James's Palace Stakes at Royal Ascot when he developed a skin rash shortly before the race.

On his first racecourse appearance for almost three months, Habat was matched against older horses for the first time in the Sussex Stakes at Goodwood Racecourse at the end of July. After racing in third place in the early stages, Habat stayed on in the straight to finish second, two lengths behind the French-trained four-year-old Ace of Aces. His next race was scheduled to be the Queen Elizabeth II Stakes at Ascot in September, but the meeting was abandoned after heavy and persistent rain made the course unfit for racing. On his final appearance, Habat was sent to France for the Prix de la Forêt over 1400 metres at Longchamp Racecourse on 27 October. He started a 14/1 outsider and never looked likely to win, fading badly in the straight to finish unplaced behind Norther Taste.

== Stud record ==
At the end of his racing career Habat became a breeding stallion at the National Stud in 1975 at a fee of £1,500. The best of his offspring was probably Grey Desire, a durable sprinter whose wins included the Duke of York Stakes and the Abernant Stakes. He was exported to Japan in 1981. His last recorded foal was born in 1990 and died on 12 January 1994. He sired the winners of 383 races in Japan but none at Graded level.

== Assessment ==
There was no International Classification of European two-year-olds in 1973: the official handicappers of Britain, Ireland and France compiled separate rankings for horses which competed in those countries. In the British Free Handicap, Habat was assigned a weight of 127 pounds, placing him in joint-third place (alongside Cellini) behind Apalachee and Mississipian, making him the highest rated juvenile trained in Britain. The independent Timeform organisation gave him a rating of 127, ten pounds below their top-rated two-year-old Apalachee. In the 1974 British Free Handicap Habat was rated fourteen pounds inferior to the top-rated Take A Reef. Timeform gave him a rating of 121, ten pounds behind Dankaro, Caracolero, Nonoalco and Sagaro, who were joint top rated amongst the season's three-year-old colts.

== Pedigree ==
Pedigree of Habat (IRE), grey stallion, 1971
Sire Habitat (USA) 1966	Sir Gaylord (USA); 1959	Turn-To	Royal Charger
Sire Habitat (USA) 1966	Sir Gaylord (USA); 1959	Turn-To	Source Sucree
Sire Habitat (USA) 1966	Sir Gaylord (USA); 1959	Somethingroyal	Princequillo
Sire Habitat (USA) 1966	Sir Gaylord (USA); 1959	Somethingroyal	Imperatrice
Sire Habitat (USA) 1966	Little Hut (USA); 1952	Occupy	Bull Dog
Sire Habitat (USA) 1966	Little Hut (USA); 1952	Occupy	Miss Bunting
Sire Habitat (USA) 1966	Little Hut (USA); 1952	Savage Beauty	Challenger
Sire Habitat (USA) 1966	Little Hut (USA); 1952	Savage Beauty	Khara
Dam Atrevida (FR) 1958	Sunny Boy (FR); 1944	Jock	Asterus
Dam Atrevida (FR) 1958	Sunny Boy (FR); 1944	Jock	Naic
Dam Atrevida (FR) 1958	Sunny Boy (FR); 1944	Fille de Soleil	Solario
Dam Atrevida (FR) 1958	Sunny Boy (FR); 1944	Fille de Soleil	Fille de Salut
Dam Atrevida (FR) 1958	Palariva (GB); 1953	Palestine	Fair Trial
Dam Atrevida (FR) 1958	Palariva (GB); 1953	Palestine	Una
Dam Atrevida (FR) 1958	Palariva (GB); 1953	Rivaz	Nearco
Dam Atrevida (FR) 1958	Palariva (GB); 1953	Rivaz	Mumtaz Begum (Family:9-c)
