= Wolver Hollow =

British Thoroughbred racehorse and sire (1964–1987)

- Colours of Mrs C. O. Iselin
- Sire: Sovereign Path
- Grandsire: Grey Sovereign
- Dam: Cygnet
- Damsire: Caracalla
- Sex: Stallion
- Foaled: 1964
- Country: United Kingdom
- Colour: Bay
- Owner: Hope Goddard Iselin
- Trainer: Cecil Boyd-Rochfort; Henry Cecil
- Record: 20: 4-5-3
- Earnings: £40,546

Major wins
- Eclipse Stakes (1969)

Awards
- Leading sire in Great Britain and Ireland (1976)

Honours
- Timeform rating: 126
- Last updated on 19 February 2025

Wolver Hollow (1964– 13 June 1987) was a British-bred Thoroughbred racehorse and sire. A career spanning four seasons established him as a good racehorse, his greatest win coming in the Group One Eclipse Stakes in 1969. He also achieved success as a stallion, becoming champion sire in Britain.

== Background ==
By Sovereign Path and out of Cygnet, Wolver Hollow was sold as a yearling, fetching 4,000 guineas Sovereign Path, rated 125 by Timeform, was successful in the 1959 Tetrarch Stakes as well as the 1960 renewals of the Lockinge Stakes and Queen Elizabeth II Stakes. As a sire, he produced sixteen crops of racehorses, the most notable of which was Humble Duty. He also counted multiple big race winners among his progeny, including Town Crier (Queen Anne Stakes), Supreme Sovereign (Lockinge Stakes) and Spanish Express (Middle Park Stakes). While Wolver Hollow's dam Cygnet, by undefeated champion racehorse Caracalla, did not hail from an immediately prolific family, her third dam, Sunshot, was the granddam of classic winners Resplendent (1926 Irish Oaks and dam of Windsor Lad) and Sol Speranza who won the same two classics in 1937. Alongside Wolver Hollow, Cygnet produced nine other foals including Gaybrook Swan, second in the 1970 Niagara Handicap, and Tall Dream, runner-up in both the National Stakes and Beresford Stakes of 1971.

== Racing career ==
=== 1966: two-year-old season ===
Wolver Hollow made his debut in the 1966 New Stakes, now known as the Norfolk Stakes, at Ascot, where he finished four lengths behind the Johnson Houghton-trained Falcon. On his second start, he finished behind Falcon again when fourth in the National Stakes at Sandown. Wolver Hollow was unplaced at Kempton before rounding off the season finishing fourth of thirteen starters in the Dewhurst Stakes behind subsequent English and Irish Derby third Dart Board.

=== 1967: three-year-old season ===
At Newbury, Wolver Hollow contested the Greenham Stakes, a traditional trial for the 2000 Guineas. Finishing third by a neck and a head, this was the closest he had come to shedding his maiden tag in an unremarkable Guineas trial at the time. However, this was useful form as the runner up, Reform, became the leading miler of the season. Wolver Hollow started at an unfancied 40/1 when finishing unplaced in the 2000 Guineas. Returning to Royal Ascot, Wolver Hollow finished just under a length and a half fourth in the St James's Palace Stakes. At the Goodwood meeting, Wolver Hollow entered handicap company with a reasonable fifth under second top-weight, giving a pound to Irish Derby runner up Sucaryl and six pounds to Falmouth Stakes winner Resilience. After stepping down in class a month later, Wolver Hollow lost his maiden tag in the ten-furlong Virginia Stakes at Newcastle. Little over a week later, Wolver Hollow doubled his tally with success in the one-mile Crathorne Sweepstakes at York. After the race, he was given a 25/1 quote for the Cambridgeshire Handicap. Wolver Hollow next contested the Wavertree Stakes at Newmarket but was unable to complete a hat-trick, finishing a length and three quarters behind easy Nassau Stakes winner Fair Winter. Wolver Hollow ended his season with a two and a half length third in the Cambridgeshire off 8st 12lb behind Irish 1,000 Guineas winner Lacquer.

=== 1968: four-year-old season ===
Wolver Hollow did not appear until August, when he participated in two races at the Deauville summer festival. The first saw him fourth in the Prix Gontaut-Biron won by Frontal, himself placed in the previous season's Prix du Jockey Club. On ground considered too soft for him, Wolver Hollow was squeezed out of third by a head by Grandier who went on to win the Prix d'Ispahan and Prix Ganay, as well as finishing third in the Prix de l'Arc de Triomphe. Nine days later, Wolver Hollow won the Prix Ridgway from Right Honourable and Atopolis. His next run was in the Queen Elizabeth II Stakes. The field featured Sussex Stakes runner-up World Cup, Prix Jean Prat victor Lorenzaccio and Greenham Stakes winner Heathen. World Cup beat Wolver Hollow into second by four lengths with Lorenzaccio a further three lengths back, on soft ground. In the Cambridgeshire, Wolver Hollow shouldered top weight of 9st 8lb. The horse ran a career best to finish second, going down by a neck to Emirilo despite conceding twenty-seven pounds.

=== 1969: five-year-old season ===
Henry Cecil's first season as a racehorse trainer saw him take charge of Wolver Hollow. His reappearance came in the Mark Lane Jubilee Stakes, a ten-furlong handicap over ten furlongs on very soft ground. Wolver Hollow carried top weight and the race was won by eight lengths by bottom weight Sovereign Ruler, who subsequently ran very well that season. Wolver Hollow had run strongly to finish runner-up, conceding thirty-five pounds. He was considered a contender for the Lockinge Stakes on his next start. However, he finished last of six behind Habitat and subsequently underwent a dope test. Wolver Hollow's penultimate start came at Royal Ascot in the Prince of Wales's Stakes, where he was ridden by Lester Piggott for the first time. Among the horse's rivals was Noel Murless's top class Connaught, who won easily from Wolver Hollow. Wolver Hollow's final start, and greatest success, came in the Eclipse Stakes, in which he was the last horse to carry his owner's colours. Of the seven runners at Sandown, Light Wind had won that season's Premio Presidente della Repubblica, Hogarth the 1968 Derby Italiano and Timmy My Boy was runner-up in that year's French Derby; Royal Rocket was third in the Coronation Stakes, while sole three-year-old Rocked had finished third in the Greenham Stakes. Park Top, bidding to become the first mare to win the race, had been successful in all three races to date that season, the Prix de la Seine, the Coronation Cup and the Hardwicke Stakes. The waiting tactics normally employed on the mare proved to be her undoing as she finished second to Wolver Hollow. The form was franked when Park Top subsequently won the King George VI and Queen Elizabeth Stakes. With his racing career, complete Wolver Hollow was retried for a career as a stallion.

== Races ==
Date	Finish	Race	Dist	Jockey	Winner/Runner up	Track
16 June 1966	2nd	New Stakes	5f	Stan Clayton	Falcon	Ascot
20 July 1966	4th	National Stakes	5f	Stan Clayton	Falcon	Sandown Park
17 September 1966	Unplaced	Imperial Stakes	6f	Stan Clayton	Heath Rose	Kempton Park
14 October 1966	4th	Dewhurst Stakes	7f	Stan Clayton	Dart Board	Newmarket
22 April 1967	3rd	Greenham Stakes	7f	Doug Smith	Play High	Newbury
3 May 1967	Unplaced	2000 Guineas Stakes	1m	Doug Smith	Royal Palace	Newmarket
20 June 1967	4th	St James's Palace Stakes	1m	George Moore	Reform	Ascot
28 July 1967	5th	News of the World Stakes	1m2f	Jimmy Lindley	Sucaryl	Goodwood
28 August 1967	1st	Virginia Stakes	1m2f	Edward Hide	Future Fame	Newcastle
7 September 1967	1st	Crathorne Sweepstakes	1m	Edward Hide	Scottish Sinbad	York
16 September 1967	3rd	Wavertree Sweepstakes	1m2f	Doug Smith	Fair Winter	Newmarket
21 October 1967	3rd	Cambridgeshire Handicap	1m1f	Scobie Breasley	Lacquer	Newmarket
17 August 1968	4th	Prix Gontaut-Biron	1m2f	Scobie Breasley	Frontal	Deauville
26 August 1968	1st	Prix Ridgway	1m2f	Scobie Breasley	Right Honourable	Deauville
28 September 1968	2nd	Queen Elizabeth II Stakes	1m	Scobie Breasley	World Cup	Ascot
19 October 1968	2nd	Cambridgeshire Handicap	1m1f	Scobie Breasley	Emerilo	Newmarket
10 May 1969	2nd	Jubilee Stakes	1m2f	Jimmy Lindley	Sovereign Ruler	Kempton Park
31 May 1969	6th	Lockinge Stakes	1m	Jimmy Lindley	Habitat	Newbury
17 June 1969	2nd	Prince of Wales's Stakes	1m2f	Lester Piggott	Connaught	Ascot
5 July 1969	1st	Eclipse Stakes	1m2f	Lester Piggott	Park Top	Sandown Park

== Stud career ==
Owner Hope Goddard Iselin, who retired at the age of 102, sent Wolver Hollow to his former trainer Cecil Boyd-Rochfort. He was syndicated by the Curragh Bloodstock Agency and initially stood at Athgarvan Stud at the Curragh. Through a friendship between Boyd-Rochfort and Billy Iceton, Wolver Hollow spent his latter breeding career at Tara Stud in County Meath. Wolver Hollow enjoyed success with his first crop, spearheaded by the classic winning Furry Glen. His greatest achievement as a stallion came in 1976 when the Cecil-trained Wollow won five top-class races, enabling his sire to become the leading sire in the UK and Ireland. Wolver Hollow earned his accolade with a record of 34 wins from 18 horses, amassing £192,362 in prize money (£166,389 from by Wollow). While Wolver Hollow produced some more useful horses, none of them won at the highest level.

As a damsire Wolver Hollow's descendant Love A Show was victorious in the 1983 Blue Diamond Stakes. Other progeny of note include Reach, winner of the 1984 Royal Lodge Stakes, Festive Cheer, third in the 1991 Phoenix Stakes, Treasure Hope, winner of the 1992 Premio Regina Elena (Italian 1000 Guineas), and Wrapping, runner-up in the 1989 Oaks d'Italia. Wolver Hollow was also the damsire of several useful National Hunt horses such as Simply Dashing, a high-class handicap chaser who finished second in the Charlie Hall Chase of 1992, Baring Bingham Novices' Hurdle winner Thetford Forest and useful handicapper Latent Talent.

Wolver Hollow was euthanised due to deteriorating health on 13 June 1987.

=== Notable progeny ===
c = colt, f = filly, g = gelding

Foaled	Name	Dam	Sex	Major Wins and Notable Performances
1971	Charlie Bubbles	Sixandahalf	c	1st Hardwicke Stakes (1975)
1971	Furry Glen	Cleftess	c	1st Marble Hill Stakes (1973) 1st Mullion Stakes (1973) 1st Irish 2000 Guineas (1974) 1st Whitehall Stakes (1974) 2nd Vauxhall Trial Stakes (1974) 2nd Gallinule Stakes (1974) 3rd Coventry Stakes (1973) 3rd Larkspur Stakes (1973)
1971	Wanlockhead	Exultation	c	3rd Westbury Stakes (1975)
1973	Wollow	Wichuraiana	c	1st Champagne Stakes (1975) 1st Dewhurst Stakes (1975) 1st Greenham Stakes (1976) 1st 2000 Guineas (1976) 1st Eclipse Stakes (1976) 1st Sussex Stakes (1976) 1st Benson & Hedges Gold Cup (1976)
1973	Wolverlife	Miralife	c	3rd Duke of York Stakes (1977) 3rd Palace House Stakes (1977) 3rd Cork and Orrery Stakes
1975	My Hollow	Saucy Mine	f	1st Royal Whip Stakes (1980) 1st Desmond Stakes (1980) 2nd Blandford Stakes (1980)
1976	Galaxy Libra	Garden of Eden	c	1st Man o' War Stakes (1981) 2nd Joe Hirsch Turf Classic Invitational Stakes (1981) 3rd Hollywood Invitational Handicap (1981) 3rd Washington, D.C. International Stakes (1981)
1976	Wolverton	Mary Murphy	c	1st Prix du Rond-Point (1979) 1st Prix Edmond Blanc (1980) 2nd Prix Greffulhe (1979)
1977	Gift Wrapped	Doc Nan	f	1st Lingfield Oaks Trial (1980) 2nd Musidora Stakes (1980) 3rd Queen Elizabeth II Stakes (1980) 3rd Sun Chariot Stakes (1980)
1979	Hays	Sing A Song	c	1st Mill Reef Stakes (1981) 1st 2,000 Guineas Trial Stakes (1982) 2nd Champagne Stakes (1981) 2nd Hungerford Stakes (1982)
1979	Teofane	The Yellow Girl	c	2nd Derby Italiano (1982)
1980	Sherbaz	Shelina	c	3rd Prix La Rochette (1982)
1981	Gamelion	Glamingo	g	1st Prix des Drags (1986)
1983	Hollow Hand	Fingers	c	2nd Horris Hill Stakes (1985)

== Pedigree ==
Pedigree of Wolver Hollow (GB), bay horse, 1964
Sire Sovereign Path (GB) 1956	Grey Sovereign (GB); 1948	Nasrullah	Nearco
Sire Sovereign Path (GB) 1956	Grey Sovereign (GB); 1948	Nasrullah	Mumtaz Begum
Sire Sovereign Path (GB) 1956	Grey Sovereign (GB); 1948	Kong	Baytown
Sire Sovereign Path (GB) 1956	Grey Sovereign (GB); 1948	Kong	Clang
Sire Sovereign Path (GB) 1956	Mountain Path (GB); 1948	Bobsleigh	Gainsborough
Sire Sovereign Path (GB) 1956	Mountain Path (GB); 1948	Bobsleigh	Toboggan
Sire Sovereign Path (GB) 1956	Mountain Path (GB); 1948	Path Of Peace	Winalot
Sire Sovereign Path (GB) 1956	Mountain Path (GB); 1948	Path Of Peace	Grand Peace
Dam Cygnet (GB) 1950	Caracalla (FR); 1942	Tourbillon	Ksar
Dam Cygnet (GB) 1950	Caracalla (FR); 1942	Tourbillon	Durban
Dam Cygnet (GB) 1950	Caracalla (FR); 1942	Astronomie	Asterus
Dam Cygnet (GB) 1950	Caracalla (FR); 1942	Astronomie	Likka
Dam Cygnet (GB) 1950	Mrs. Swan Song (IRE); 1940	Sir Walter Raleigh	Prince Galahad
Dam Cygnet (GB) 1950	Mrs. Swan Song (IRE); 1940	Sir Walter Raleigh	Smoke Lass
Dam Cygnet (GB) 1950	Mrs. Swan Song (IRE); 1940	Donati's Comet	Flying Orb
Dam Cygnet (GB) 1950	Mrs. Swan Song (IRE); 1940	Donati's Comet	Sunshot
