= Giacometti (horse) =

Irish-bred Thoroughbred racehorse

- Sire: Faberge
- Grandsire: Princely Gift
- Dam: Naujwan
- Damsire: Ommeyad
- Sex: Stallion
- Foaled: 1971
- Country: Ireland
- Colour: Chestnut
- Breeder: C A Ryan
- Owner: Charles St George
- Trainer: H. Ryan Price
- Record: 10: 4-3-2

Major wins
- Gimcrack Stakes (1973); Champagne Stakes (1973); Champion Stakes (1974)

Awards
- Timeform rating 118p (1973), 130 (1974), 125 (1975)

Giacometti (1971 – after 1985) was an Irish-bred, British-trained Thoroughbred racehorse and sire. In 1974 he became the fourth horse since the Second World War to be placed in all three legs of the British Triple Crown. Regarded by his stable as a potential "world beater", he was unbeaten as a two-year-old, winning his first race by at least twelve lengths and then taking the Gimcrack Stakes and the Champagne Stakes. As a three-year-old he finished second in the 2000 Guineas, third in The Derby and second in the St Leger before winning the Champion Stakes. After two defeats in 1975 he was retired to stud in the United States where he made very little impact as a breeding stallion.

== Background ==
Giacometti was rangy, good-looking chestnut horse with a short white sock on his left hind leg bred in Ireland by C A Ryan. He was sired by Faberge, a French-bred horse who finished second to Baldric in the 2000 Guineas. At stud, Faberge sired the Prix de l'Arc de Triomphe winner Rheingold before being exported to Japan. Giacometti's dam Naujwan was unbeaten in two races but came from a relatively undistinguished family, although her great-grand-dam Salecraft was a half-sister of the Derby winner Straight Deal.

As a yearling, Giacometti was offered for sale in October and bought for 5000 guineas by Jack Doyle acting on behalf of the Lloyd's underwriter Charles St George. St George sent the colt into training with Captain Ryan Price at Downs House, Findon, West Sussex. He was ridden in the early part of his racing career by Tony Murray.

== Racing career ==
=== 1973: two-year-old season ===
Before he appeared on a racecourse, Giacometti had built up a formidable reputation, and was reportedly regarded by Price as the best horse he had ever trained. He made his debut in the Mountfield Plate, a maiden race over six furlongs at Lingfield Park in June and started at odds of 4/6 in a fourteen-runner field. He led from the start and was never challenged, winning easily by a margin officially given as twelve lengths although the photo finish strip suggested that he had won by sixteen. The colt was then moved up in class for the Group Two Gimcrack Stakes over six furlongs at York Racecourse in August and started 11/10 favourite ahead of Dragonara Palace, the winner of the July Stakes and Richmond Stakes. Giacometti won again, but produced a disappointing performance, being ridden along by Tony Murray from the start and struggling to overcome Late Love by a length, with Music Maestro a head away in third. He was then moved up in distance for the Champagne Stakes over seven furlongs at Doncaster Racecourse in September and started the 8/11 favourite. He took the lead two furlongs from the finish, and held off the late challenge of Snow Knight to win by a short head with Pitcairn in third.

=== 1974: three-year-old season ===
As a three-year-old, Giacometti was campaigned exclusively in Group One races. In the 2000 Guineas over the Rowley Mile at Newmarket Racecourse he faced a strong field and finished second, beaten a length and a half by the French challenger Nonoalco, with the 4/9 favourite Apalachee in third, Northern Taste in fourth and Habat sixth. A month later, Giacometti started 5/2 second favourite behind Nonoalco for the 195th running of the Derby Stakes over one and a half miles at Epsom Downs Racecourse. He settled just behind the leaders on the inside and turned into the straight in third place behind Snow Knight (a 50/1 outsider) and Imperial Prince. In the last quarter mile he was switched to the outside but could make no impact on the two leaders and finished third, beaten two lengths and a length by Snow Knight and Imperial Prince, just in front of the fast-finishing Bustino. Giacometti was matched against older horses for the first time in the Eclipse Stakes over ten furlongs at Sandown in July, and started favourite, but ran poorly and finished fifth of the twelve runners behind the 33/1 outsider Coup de Feu and the four-year-old Ksar. He was found to be suffering from a "blood disorder" and was off the course until autumn.

Giacometti returned in September when he ran in the St Leger over fourteen and a half furlongs at Doncaster Racecourse, with Lester Piggott taking over the ride from Murray. Restrained at the back of the nine-runner field in the early stages, he made rapid progress in the straight, overtaking horse after horse, but was never able to reach the leader Bustino and finished second, beaten three lengths by the winner. His performance made him the first horse since Nijinsky to be placed in all three legs of the Triple Crown: the only other horses to have done so since 1945 have been Sayajirao in 1947, Nagami in 1958 and Camelot (2012). In October Giacometti started at odds of 4/1 on what was thought to be unsuitably soft ground, for the Champion Stakes over ten furlongs at Newmarket. His task was eased by the withdrawal of Allez France, but he faced thirteen opponents including Coup de Feu, Ksar, Pitcairn (Goodwood Mile), Northern Gem (Pretty Polly Stakes) and Star Appeal. Piggott positioned the colt just behind the leaders before taking the advantage two furlongs from the finish. Giacometti never looked in any danger of defeat and won by two and a half lengths from Northern Gem with Pitcairn in third.

=== 1975: four-year-old season ===
On his first appearance as a four-year-old, Giacometti contested the Brigadier Gerard Stakes at Sandown in May and was beaten half a length by Rymer in a slowly-run race. In June at Royal Ascot he started favourite for the Prince of Wales's Stakes, but was beaten into third place behind Record Run and Swell Fellow. He did not race again and was retired from competition at the end of the season.

== Assessment ==
There was no International Classification of European two-year-olds in 1973: the official handicappers of Britain, Ireland and France compiled separate rankings for horses which competed in those countries. In the British Free Handicap, Giacometti was assigned a weight of 123 pounds, placing him in joint-fifth place behind Apalachee, Mississipian, Cellini and Habat. The independent Timeform organisation gave him a rating of 118 p, (the "p" indicating that he was likely to make more than the usual improvement), eighteen pounds below their top-rated two-year-old Apalachee. In the British handicap for 1974 he was rated the sixth-best three-year-old behind Take A Reef, Bustino, Nonoalco, Dibidale and Snow Knight. Timeform gave him a rating of 130, level with Bustino as the best British-trained three-year-old of the year, a pound behind the French horses Nonoalco, Sagaro, Dankaro, Caracolero and Comtesse de Loir. In their annual Racehorses of 1974, Timeform commented "He isn't the world-beater that his stable has often claimed but that's no fault of his and he is, in fact, a genuine and consistent animal". Giacometti was rated on 125 by Timeform after his abbreviated 1975 campaign.

== Stud record ==
At the end of his racing career, Giacometti was sold and exported to the United States where he began his stud career at Gainesway Farm at a fee of $7,500. He had very little success as a sire of winners: by far the most successful of his offspring was the mare Nettie Cometti, who won $571,900 and thirteen races including the 1986 edition of the Grade II Golden Harvest Handicap at Louisiana Downs.

Giacometti's last known foals were born in 1986.

== Pedigree ==
Pedigree of Giacometti (IRE), chestnut stallion, 1971
Sire Faberge (FR) 1961	Princely Gift (GB); 1951	Nasrullah	Nearco
Sire Faberge (FR) 1961	Princely Gift (GB); 1951	Nasrullah	Mumtaz Begum
Sire Faberge (FR) 1961	Princely Gift (GB); 1951	Blue Gem	Blue Peter
Sire Faberge (FR) 1961	Princely Gift (GB); 1951	Blue Gem	Sparkle
Sire Faberge (FR) 1961	Spring Offensive (GB); 1943	Legend of France	Dark Legend
Sire Faberge (FR) 1961	Spring Offensive (GB); 1943	Legend of France	Francille
Sire Faberge (FR) 1961	Spring Offensive (GB); 1943	Batika	Blenheim
Sire Faberge (FR) 1961	Spring Offensive (GB); 1943	Batika	Brise Brise
Dam Naujwan (GB) 1960	Ommeyad (GB); 1954	Hyperion	Gainsborough
Dam Naujwan (GB) 1960	Ommeyad (GB); 1954	Hyperion	Selene
Dam Naujwan (GB) 1960	Ommeyad (GB); 1954	Minaret	Umidwar
Dam Naujwan (GB) 1960	Ommeyad (GB); 1954	Minaret	Neolight
Dam Naujwan (GB) 1960	Migolette (IRE); 1955	Migoli	Bois Roussel
Dam Naujwan (GB) 1960	Migolette (IRE); 1955	Migoli	Mah Iran
Dam Naujwan (GB) 1960	Migolette (IRE); 1955	Sylko	Nearco
Dam Naujwan (GB) 1960	Migolette (IRE); 1955	Sylko	Salecraft (Family: 1-t)

- Giacometti was inbred 4 x 4 to Nearco, meaning that this stallion appears twice in the fourth generation of his pedigree.
