= Hishi Amazon =

Japanese thoroughbred racehorse

Hishi Amazon ヒシアマゾン
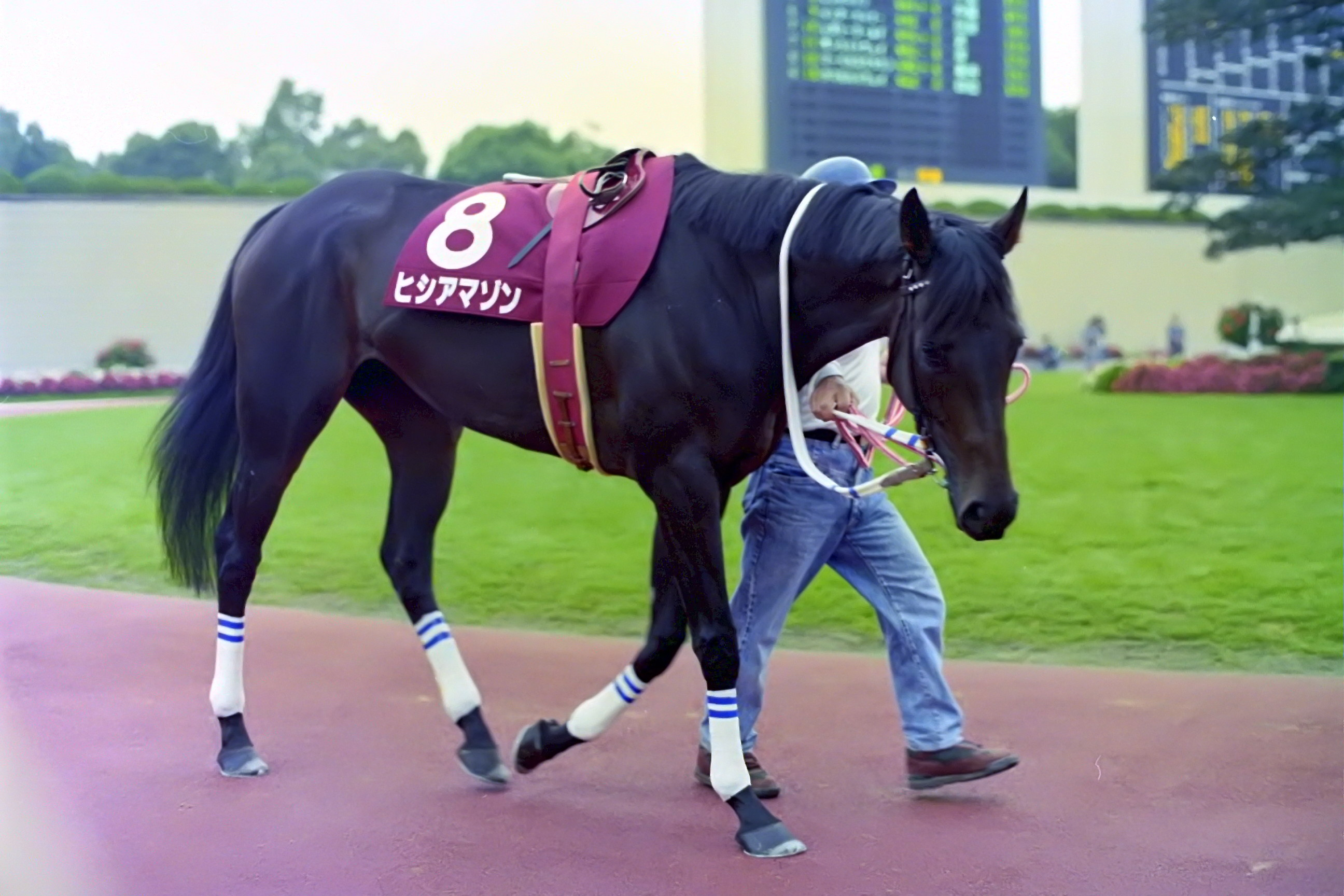
- Hishi Amazon in October 1995.
- Breed: Thoroughbred
- Sire: Theatrical
- Grandsire: Nureyev
- Dam: Katies
- Damsire: Nonoalco
- Sex: Mare
- Foaled: March 26, 1991
- Died: April 15, 2019 (aged 28)
- Country: Japan
- Color: Dark Bay
- Breeder: Masaichiro Abe
- Owner: Masaichiro Abe
- Racing colors
- Trainer: Takao Nakano
- Jockey: Eiji Nakadate
- Record: 20: 10-5-0
- Earnings: ¥695,829,000

Major wins
- Hanshin Sansai Himba Stakes (1993); New Zealand Trophy Yonsai Stakes (1994); Rose Stakes (1994); Sankei Sho All Comers (1995); Kyoto Daishoten (1995); Japanese Classic Tiara Race wins: Queen Elizabeth II Cup (1994)

Awards
- JRA Award for Best Two-Year-Old Filly (Note: Prior to Japan's revision of the way it counts horse ages to match the international standard in 2001, newborns used to be considered 1 year old, thus these awards at the time were named "Best Three-Year-Old Filly" and "Best Four-Year-Old Filly.") (1993); JRA Award for Best Three-Year-Old Filly (1994); JRA Award for Best Older Filly or Mare (1995)

Hishi Amazon (Japanese: ヒシアマゾン; March 26, 1991 – April 15, 2019) was a Japanese Thoroughbred racehorse and broodmare.

Hishi Amazon was born in the United States and trained in Japan. She won the 1993 JRA Award for Best Two-Year-Old Filly, the 1994 JRA Award for Best Three-Year-Old Filly, and the 1995 JRA Award for Best Older Filly or Mare.

Her main jockey was Eiji Nakadate, only being jockeyed by someone else in the second race after her debut and her final race at the Arima Kinen.

== Overview ==
Hishi Amazon's racing career was marked both by the JRA's still-severe restrictions on foreign-born horses and also how well she competed against colts and stallions in spite of those restrictions. At the time, foreign-born horses weren't allowed to compete in the Classic races, and as a filly, Hishi Amazon's options for G1 races were limited.

After her first two races, which were on dirt tracks instead of turf due to worsening periostitis, she placed 2nd in her first graded race on a turf track, the Keio Hai Sansai Stakes. Later that year, Hishi Amazon won the filly-only G1 Hanshin Sansai Himba Stakes by five lengths, earning the JRA Award for Best Three-Year-Old Filly in 1993.

Despite being unable to race in the 1994 Classics, she won five graded races in a row that year—many over colts—culminating in a victory in the Queen Elizabeth II Commemorative Cup over Classic winners Oguri Roman and Chokai Carol. While she lost the G1 Arima Kinen to Triple Crown-winner Narita Brian, she still came in second despite being the number-six favorite, beating out other veteran stallions like Rice Shower. She was given the JRA Award for Best Four-Year-Old Filly in 1994.

For the next two years, she began to struggle more in races, though she won the 1995 Sankei Sho All Comers and Kyoto Daishoten and placed 2nd in the Japan Cup, highest of all Japanese horses in that race. Her efforts earned her the JRA Award for Best Older Filly or Mare that year. She retired after three more races in 1996, becoming a broodmare.

== In popular culture ==
An anthropomorphized version of Hishi Amazon appears as a character in the Japanese multimedia franchise Umamusume: Pretty Derby, voiced by Yuiko Tatsumi. She is depicted as the assigned head student of Miho, one of Tracen Academy's dormitory buildings named after the real-life training center of the same name, where she is famous for her generosity, such as by cooking meals for her schoolmates. She is also a stubborn, competitive, and hot-blooded racer who likes to boldly challenge others to one-on-one matches, such as her rival Narita Brian, but always demonstrates good sportsmanship against her opponents.

== Racing statistics ==
The following statistics are based on information from netkeiba and JBIS. (Note: Prior to Japan's revision of the way it counts horse ages to match the international standard in 2001, newborns used to be considered 1 year old, thus there is a one-year difference in the names of certain races.)

Date	Age	Track	Name	Grade	Type/Distance	Field	Finished	Time	Jockey	Winner (2nd Place)
September 19, 1993	2	Nakayama	Maiden Race		Dirt 1200m	11	1st	1:13.7	Eiji Nakadate	(Nobori Ryu)
October 24, 1993	2	Tokyo	Platanus Sho		Dirt 1400m	11	2nd	1:26.3	Teruo Eda	Mitsuru Masaru
November 13, 1993	2	Tokyo	Keio Hai Sansai Stakes	G2	Turf 1400m	9	2nd	1:22.9	Eiji Nakadate	Yamanin Ability
December 5, 1993	2	Hanshin	Hanshin Sansai Himba Stakes	G1	Turf 1600m	15	1st	R1:35.9	Eiji Nakadate	(Robe Montante)
January 9, 1994	3	Nakayama	Keisei Hai	G3	Turf 1600m	8	2nd	1:34.2	Eiji Nakadate	Biko Pegasus
January 30, 1994	3	Tokyo	Queen Cup	G3	Turf 1600m	13	1st	1:35.1	Eiji Nakadate	(Eishin Vermont)
April 16, 1994	3	Nakayama	Crystal Cup	G3	Turf 1200m	14	1st	1:08.5	Eiji Nakadate	(Taiki Wolf)
June 5, 1994	3	Tokyo	New Zealand Trophy Yonsai Stakes	G2	Turf 1600m	9	1st	1:35.8	Eiji Nakadate	(Machikane Allegro)
October 2, 1994	3	Nakayama	Queen Stakes	G3	Turf 2000m	11	1st	2:02.9	Eiji Nakadate	(Jono Butterfly)
October 23, 1994	3	Hanshin	Rose Stakes	G2	Turf 2000m	15	1st	2:00.0	Eiji Nakadate	(Agnes Parade)
November 13, 1994	3	Kyoto	Queen Elizabeth II Commemorative Cup	G1	Turf 2400m	18	1st	2:24.3	Eiji Nakadate	(Chokai Carol)
December 25, 1994	3	Nakayama	Arima Kinen	G1	Turf 2500m	13	2nd	2:32.7	Eiji Nakadate	Narita Brian
July 9, 1995	4	Chukyo	Takamatsunomiya Hai	G2	Turf 2000m	12	5th	2:03.0	Eiji Nakadate	Matikanetannhauser
September 18, 1995	4	Nakayama	Sankei Sho All Comers	G2	Turf 2200m	10	1st	2:16.3	Eiji Nakadate	(Irish Dance)
October 8, 1995	4	Kyoto	Kyoto Daishoten	G2	Turf 2400m	13	1st	2.25.3	Eiji Nakadate	(Tamamo Highway)
November 26, 1995	4	Tokyo	Japan Cup	G1	Turf 2400m	14	2nd	2:24.8	Eiji Nakadate	Lando
December 24, 1995	4	Nakayama	Arima Kinen	G1	Turf 2500m	12	5th	2:34.6	Eiji Nakadate	Mayano Top Gun
June 9, 1996	5	Tokyo	Yasuda Kinen	G1	Turf 1600m	17	10th	1:33.9	Eiji Nakadate	Trot Thunder
November 10, 1996	5	Kyoto	Queen Elizabeth II Commemorative Cup	G1	Turf 2200m	16	7th(*)	2:14.3	Eiji Nakadate	Dance Partner
December 22, 1996	5	Nakayama	Arima Kinen	G1	Turf 2500m	14	5th	2:35.0	Hiroshi Kawachi	Sakura Laurel

(*) Demoted from 2nd.

== Pedigree ==
Pedigree of Hishi Amazon
Sire Theatrical	Nureyev	Northern Dancer	Nearctic
Sire Theatrical	Nureyev	Northern Dancer	Natalma
Sire Theatrical	Nureyev	Special	Forli
Sire Theatrical	Nureyev	Special	Thong
Sire Theatrical	Tree of Knowledge	Sassafras	Sheshoon
Sire Theatrical	Tree of Knowledge	Sassafras	Ruta
Sire Theatrical	Tree of Knowledge	Sensibility	Hail to Reason
Sire Theatrical	Tree of Knowledge	Sensibility	Pange
Dam Katies	Nonoalco	Nearctic	Nearco
Dam Katies	Nonoalco	Nearctic	Lady Angela
Dam Katies	Nonoalco	Seximee	Hasty Road
Dam Katies	Nonoalco	Seximee	Jambo
Dam Katies	Mortefontaine	Polic	Relic
Dam Katies	Mortefontaine	Polic	Polaine
Dam Katies	Mortefontaine	Barbantia	Honeyway
Dam Katies	Mortefontaine	Barbantia	Parthaven

== See also ==
- List of racehorses
