= 2,000 Guineas (disambiguation) =

2000 Guineas Stakes, also known as the 2,000 Guineas for short, is a horse race in England in May since 1807

2,000 Guineas may also refer to the following horse races:

- 2,000 Guineas Trial Stakes, a trial race for the 2000 Guineas Stakes in England in April 1968–1986
- Irish 2,000 Guineas
- New Zealand 2000 Guineas
- UAE 2000 Guineas
- French 2,000 Guineas, unofficial nickname for the Poule d'Essai des Poulains
- Satsuki Shō, often referred to as the Japanese 2000 Guineas
