= Kooyonga =

Irish Thoroughbred racehorse

- Sire: Persian Bold
- Grandsire: Bold Lad (IRE)
- Dam: Anjuli
- Damsire: Northfields
- Sex: Mare
- Foaled: 12 May 1988
- Country: Ireland
- Colour: Chestnut
- Breeder: Ovidstown Stud Stud
- Owner: Mitsuo Haga
- Trainer: Michael Kauntze
- Record: 18: 9-4-1
- Earnings: £858,536

Major wins
- Leopardstown Stakes (1990); Leopardstown 1000 Guineas Trial (1991); Irish 1,000 Guineas (1991); Coronation Stakes (1991); Matron Stakes (1991); Eclipse Stakes (1992); Bayerisches Zuchtrennen (1992)

Awards
- European Champion Three-Year-Old Filly (1991)
- Last updated on August 25, 2007

Kooyonga was an Irish champion Thoroughbred racehorse who raced from 1990 to 1992. After showing good form as a juvenile, she had a highly successful three-year-old campaign, winning the Group One Irish 1,000 Guineas and the Coronation Stakes and being named European Champion Three-Year-Old Filly at the Cartier Racing Awards. She stayed in training as a four-year-old and became the second filly (after Pebbles) to win the Eclipse Stakes.

== Background ==
Kooyonga was bred in Ireland by Sean Collins at the Ovidstown Stud, near Maynooth, County Kildare. Her sire, Persian Bold was a successful racehorse who won the Richmond Stakes in 1977. He went on to be a "good" stallion, getting important winners such as Falcon Flight (Prix Hocquart), Persian Heights (St James's Palace Stakes) and Bold Russian (Celebration Mile). Kooyonga's dam, Anjuli, was an unraced half sister of the 2000 Guineas winner Roland Gardens.

Kooyonga was trained throughout her career by Michael Kauntze at Ashbourne, County Meath and ridden in all but three of her races by Warren O'Connor. Her name was derived from that of a Golf Club in South Australia.

== Racing career ==
=== 1990: two-year-old season ===
Kooyonga first appeared on a racecourse in August when she won a maiden race at Gowran Park by three lengths. Four weeks later she was moved up to Listed class and won the Silver Flash Stakes at Phoenix Park by a head from the odds-on favourite African Dance. In October, she returned to Phoenix Park for the Cartier Million, a valuable sales race, in which she finished second to Rinka Das. On her final start she successfully moved to Group Three class to record a four length win in the Leopardstown Stakes.

=== 1991: three-year-old season ===
Kooyonga began her three-year-old season with a win in the Listed Leopardstown 1000 Guineas Trial and was then sent to England for the 1000 Guineas at Newmarket. Ridden by Lester Piggott, the filly was held up in the early stages, before finishing strongly to finish second, two lengths behind the odds-on favourite Shadayid.

The Vincent O'Brien trained Rua d'Oro, who Piggott chose to ride rather than Kooyonga, was made favourite for the Irish 1,000 Guineas with Kooyonga starting at 4/1. Kooyonga proved much too good for the opposition, winning by three lengths under Warren O'Connor to record her first Group One win. Following the race she was bought as prospective broodmare by the Japanese businessman Mitsuo Haga for a fee of $1,200,000. The Coronation Stakes at Royal Ascot featured a rematch between Kooyonga and Shadayid, who, since her Newmarket win, had finished third in the Oaks. O'Connor tracked the leaders on his filly before moving her past Gussy Marlowe to take the lead in the straight. Shadayid emerged to make a challenge, but Kooyonga ran on strongly to reverse the Newmarket form and win by three quarters of a length.

In September, Kooyonga was prepared for an Autumn campaign with a run in the Matron Stakes, then a Group Three race, which she won by a length from Blue Daisy. She was then sent back to Ascot for the Queen Elizabeth II Stakes, which attracted a strong field including Shadayid, Hector Protector, Selkirk and Second Set, who was made favourite after his win in the Sussex Stakes. Kooyonga moved into second place behind Shadayid in the straight and ran on strongly to overtake the English filly but was herself passed in the final furlong and beaten one and a half lengths by Selkirk.

On her final start of the season she was sent to Churchill Downs for the Breeders' Cup Mile, but failed to reproduce her best form, finishing thirteenth of the fourteen runners behind Opening Verse

=== 1992: four-year-old season ===
Kooyonga stayed in training as a four-year-old, but did not run until June when she finished unplaced as odds-on favourite in a Listed race at Leopardstown. Kooyonga was then moved up in distance to ten furlongs and sent to Royal Ascot where she showed much improved form to finish first in the Prince of Wales's Stakes (then a Group Two race). She had hung to the right in the closing stages however, and was disqualified for causing interference to Young Buster who finished third, with the race being awarded to the Henry Cecil-trained Perpendicular. Kauntze accepted that his filly had impeded Young Buster but added that "she was a bit unlucky... she was clearly the best horse on the day."

Despite unsuitably soft ground, Kooyonga started 7/2 favourite for the Eclipse Stakes at Sandown against a strong field which included notable winners such as Opera House, Arcangues, Zoman and Terimon. Kooyonga was held up at the back of the field until the straight, but then quickened past the field to take the lead a furlong out. She was ridden out by O'Connor to win "as she liked" by one and a half lengths. O'Connor, who had been criticised for his riding at Ascot and had been practising his skills on a wooden horse, said that he "had them beaten two out and she still had a bit in hand at the finish." As of 2020, she remains one of only three fillies to have won the Eclipse, the others being Pebbles in 1985 and Enable in 2019.

Kooyonga was sent to Germany for her next start, in which she was matched against Perpendicular again in the Bayerisches Zuchtrennen at Munich in August. Kooyonga quickened into a clear lead a furlong out before being eased down in the closing stages to win "comfortably" by three quarters of a length from Zaahi, with Perpendicular third. Kooyonga was made favourite for the International Stakes at York but ran very poorly, struggling to go the pace from the start and being "virtually pulled up" by O'Connor in the straight. It was subsequently revealed that Kooyonga had been in season at the time of the race.

Hopes that Kooyonga would run in the Japan Cup were abandoned after the filly failed to recover her form in her last two races. She finished a distant fourth behind Dr Devious and St Jovite in the Irish Champion Stakes, and was then well beaten when starting odds-on favourite for a minor stakes race at Leopardstown in October.

== Assessment ==
At the inaugural Cartier Racing Awards in 1991, Kooyonga was named European Champion Three-Year-Old Filly. As a four year old she was described as one of "Ireland's two best horses for almost a decade" (the other being St Jovite).

In the official International Classification, Kooyonga was rated 123 in 1991 when she was the highest-rated horse of either sex trained in Ireland. She was rated 122 in 1992 in which she was the highest rated Irish-trained filly.

== Stud career ==
After being retired to stud Kooyonga produced at least four winners including Gaily The Pride (by Seeking The Gold) and Philomatheia (by Danzig). Her last known foal was born in 2000.

== Pedigree ==
Pedigree of Kooyonga (IRE), chestnut mare, 1988
Sire Persian Bold (IRE) 1975	Bold Lad (IRE); 1964	Bold Ruler	Nasrullah
Sire Persian Bold (IRE) 1975	Bold Lad (IRE); 1964	Bold Ruler	Miss Disco
Sire Persian Bold (IRE) 1975	Bold Lad (IRE); 1964	Barn Pride	Democratic
Sire Persian Bold (IRE) 1975	Bold Lad (IRE); 1964	Barn Pride	Fair Alycia
Sire Persian Bold (IRE) 1975	Relkarunner; 1968	Relko	Tanerko
Sire Persian Bold (IRE) 1975	Relkarunner; 1968	Relko	Relance
Sire Persian Bold (IRE) 1975	Relkarunner; 1968	Running Blue	Blue Peter
Sire Persian Bold (IRE) 1975	Relkarunner; 1968	Running Blue	Run Honey
Dam Anjuli (IRE) 1978	Northfields; 1968	Northern Dancer	Nearctic
Dam Anjuli (IRE) 1978	Northfields; 1968	Northern Dancer	Natalma
Dam Anjuli (IRE) 1978	Northfields; 1968	Little Hut	Occupy
Dam Anjuli (IRE) 1978	Northfields; 1968	Little Hut	Savage Beauty
Dam Anjuli (IRE) 1978	Katricia; 1968	Skymaster	Golden Cloud
Dam Anjuli (IRE) 1978	Katricia; 1968	Skymaster	Discipliner
Dam Anjuli (IRE) 1978	Katricia; 1968	Anxious Call	Whistler
Dam Anjuli (IRE) 1978	Katricia; 1968	Anxious Call	Julie (Family: 19)
