= Take A Reef =

Irish-bred Thoroughbred racehorse

- Sire: Right Tack
- Grandsire: Hard Tack
- Dam: Nigthingale [sic]
- Damsire: Sicambre
- Sex: Stallion
- Foaled: 30 April 1971
- Country: Ireland
- Colour: Bay
- Breeder: P S Emmet
- Owner: Tony Villar
- Trainer: Bruce Hobbs
- Record: 10: 5-0-3

Major wins
- Epsom Handicap (1974); Magnet Cup (1974); Extel Stakes (1974)

Awards
- Top-rated British three-year-old (1974); Timeform rating 109 (1973), 127 (1974)

Take A Reef (30 April 1971 – 1989) was an Irish-bred, British-trained Thoroughbred racehorse and sire. Although he never won a major weight-for-age race, his wins in handicaps led to him being controversially rated the best British three-year-old of his generation in 1974. After showing promise as a two-year-old in 1973, when he won two of his six races, Take A Reef made rapid progress in the following year to win the Epsom Handicap, Magnet Cup and Extel Stakes under increasingly heavy weights. His racing career was ended by injury when he was being prepared for a run in the Champion Stakes and he was retired to stud with a record of five wins from ten races. He made very little impact as a breeding stallion and died in Sweden in 1989.

== Background ==
Take A Reef was a bay horse with a small white star and two white coronets on his left feet bred in Ireland by P. S. Emmet. He was from the first crop of foals sired by Right Tack who in 1969 became the first horse to win both the 2000 Guineas and the Irish 2,000 Guineas. Take A Reef's dam, an unraced French mare named Nigthingale (not Nightingale), was a half-sister of Night And Day who won the Prix d'Hédouville and finished second in the Prix du Jockey Club. She was a descendant of the influential broodmare Hornet, making her a distant relative of many major winners including Rule of Law, Teenoso and Sir Percy.

As a yearling, Take A Reef was acquired for 7,600 guineas by Tony Villar in partnership with his mother-in-law Betty Fyfe-Jamieson and sent into training with Bruce Hobbs at his Palace House stable in Newmarket, Suffolk. At the time, Hobbs was at the peak of his training career, handling horses such as Jacinth and Cry of Truth.

== Racing career ==
=== 1973: two-year-old season ===
After finishing third on his racecourse debut, Take A Reef won a maiden race over six furlongs at Newmarket Racecourse in July, beating twenty-one other two-year-olds. He then finished strongly to take third behind Tracker's Highway in the New Ham Stakes at Goodwood, and finished third again to the Ryan Price-trained Glen Strae when moved up in class for the Washington Singer Stakes at Newbury in August. The colt was then moved up in distance for the Tote Roll-Up Nursery, a handicap race for juveniles over one mile at Doncaster Racecourse in September. He took the lead inside the final furlong and held on to win by a head from the favourite Majordomo. On his final appearance of the season he appeared unsuited by the prevailing soft ground when finishing eighth of the fifteen runners behind Welsh Harmony in the Horris Hill Stakes at Newbury in October.

=== 1974: three-year-old season ===
Take A Reef made his three-year-old debut in the Epsom Handicap over ten furlongs at Epsom Downs Racecourse. Carrying a weight of 121 pounds on heavy ground he won by five lengths. In the Cosmopolitan Cup over the same distance at Lingfield Park Racecourse he failed to recover after being badly hampered at half way and finished fourth. In July, Take A Reef carried a weight of 124 pounds when he was matched against older horses in the valuable John Smith's Magnet Cup over ten and a half furlongs at York Racecourse. Racing on firm ground, he won by two lengths from the four-year-old Superior Sam, to whom he was conceding sixteen pounds. The other beaten horses included Prominent, winner of the Prix Foy and two previous runnings of the Magnet Cup. The form of the race was boosted when Superior Sam won the PTS Laurels Stakes at Goodwood in August by four lengths.

Take A Reef's York win meant that he had to carry a weight penalty of six pounds when he contested the Extel Stakes at Goodwood, taking his weight up to 137 pounds. His eighteen opponents included the Britannia Stakes winner Final Chord, the Free Handicap runner-up Spanish Warrior, Rymer (1975 Brigadier Gerard Stakes), Riboson (1975 Yorkshire Cup) and Record Run (1975 Prince of Wales's Stakes). He looked cool and calm in the paddock on a very hot day which saw many of his rivals sweating freely. He was restrained in the early stages before making rapid progress in the straight to take the lead inside the final furlong and won by a half a length from Final Chord (carrying 126) with Rymer (118) in third.

It was intended that Take A Reef would end his season with a run in the Group One Champion Stakes at Newmarket in October. Six weeks before the race, the colt sustained a serious injury to the tendons in his left foreleg during and exercise gallop at Newmarket and never raced again.

== Stud record ==
Following his tendon injury in the late summer of 1974, Take A Reef was bought by Fred Rimell and retired to stud. He began his career as a breeding stallion at the Longfields Stud in Cashel, County Tipperary at a fee of 800 guineas. In 1983 he was sold to Claes Björling and exported to Sweden where he died in 1989. He had very little success as a sire of flat horses but his progeny included some good jumpers including the 1989 Scottish Grand National winner Roll-A-Joint.

== Assessment ==
There was no International Classification of European two-year-olds in 1973: the official handicappers of Britain, Ireland and France compiled separate rankings for horses which competed in those countries. In the British Free Handicap, Take A Reef was assigned a weight of 107 pounds, placing him twenty-six pounds behind the top-rated Apalachee. The independent Timeform gave him a rating of 109, twenty-eight pounds behind Apalachee. In their annual Racehorses of 1973 they described him as "neat colt: excellent mover... should stay 1¼m". In the official British Handicap for 1974, Take A Reef was given a weight of 140 pounds, making him the best three-year-old of the season ahead of the winners of the five British Classic Races. He was rated one pound ahead of the St Leger winner Bustino, two ahead of the 2000 Guineas winner Nonoalco, three ahead of The Derby winner Snow Knight, four ahead of the 1000 Guineas winner Highclere and five ahead of The Oaks winner Polygamy. Timeform criticised the verdict of the official handicapper, pointing out the dangers of comparing form in handicaps with form in weight-for-age events. In their annual Racehorses of 1974 they gave him a rating of 127, four pounds behind Nonoalco, three behind Bustino and two behind Highclere, but two ahead of Snow Knight and seven ahead of Polygamy.

== Pedigree ==
Pedigree of Take A Reef (IRE), bay stallion, 1971
Sire Right Tack (GB) 1966	Hard Tack (GB); 1955	Hard Sauce	Ardan
Sire Right Tack (GB) 1966	Hard Tack (GB); 1955	Hard Sauce	Saucy Bella
Sire Right Tack (GB) 1966	Hard Tack (GB); 1955	Cowes	Blue Peter
Sire Right Tack (GB) 1966	Hard Tack (GB); 1955	Cowes	Lighthearted
Sire Right Tack (GB) 1966	Polly Macaw (IRE); 1959	Polly's Jet	Polynesian
Sire Right Tack (GB) 1966	Polly Macaw (IRE); 1959	Polly's Jet	Mary's Dell
Sire Right Tack (GB) 1966	Polly Macaw (IRE); 1959	Listowel	Solonaway
Sire Right Tack (GB) 1966	Polly Macaw (IRE); 1959	Listowel	Lady Fairford
Dam Nigthingale [sic] (FR) 1963	Sicambre; 1948	Prince Bio	Prince Rose
Dam Nigthingale [sic] (FR) 1963	Sicambre; 1948	Prince Bio	Biologie
Dam Nigthingale [sic] (FR) 1963	Sicambre; 1948	Sif	Rialto
Dam Nigthingale [sic] (FR) 1963	Sicambre; 1948	Sif	Suavita
Dam Nigthingale [sic] (FR) 1963	Nuit de Noces; 1950	Nosca	Abjer
Dam Nigthingale [sic] (FR) 1963	Nuit de Noces; 1950	Nosca	Capella
Dam Nigthingale [sic] (FR) 1963	Nuit de Noces; 1950	Hymenee	Fantastic
Dam Nigthingale [sic] (FR) 1963	Nuit de Noces; 1950	Hymenee	Hornets Law (Family:3-c)
