= Mick Ryan (racehorse trainer) =

British racehorse trainer (1941–2022)

Michael John Ryan (19 May 1941 – 27 January 2022) was a British horse trainer who trained horses which competed in both Flat racing and National Hunt racing.

Ryan's training career began in 1976 and ended in 2005. He trained the winners of over 700 races and had his biggest success when the filly Katies won the Irish 1,000 Guineas in 1984. He was also successful in races at the Cheltenham Festival and Royal Ascot. He died on 27 January 2022, at the age of 80.

== Major wins ==
- Irish 1,000 Guineas - Katies (1984)
- Christmas Hurdle - Osric (1987)
