= Cellini (horse) =

American-bred Thoroughbred racehorse

- Sire: Round Table
- Grandsire: Princequillo
- Dam: Gamely
- Damsire: Bold Ruler
- Sex: Stallion
- Foaled: 10 April 1971
- Country: United States
- Colour: Bay
- Breeder: Claiborne Farm
- Owner: Charles St George; William Stamps Farish III
- Trainer: Vincent O'Brien; Del W. Carroll
- Record: 12: 6-1-1

Major wins
- National Stakes (1973); Dewhurst Stakes (1973); Vauxhall Trial Stakes (1974); Tetrarch Stakes (1974)

Awards
- Timeform rating 125 p (1973), 118 (1974)

Cellini (foaled 10 April 1971) was an American-bred, Irish-trained Thoroughbred racehorse and sire. Bred in Kentucky he was sold for $240,000 as a yearling and sent to race in Europe. In 1973 he was one of the best colts of his generation in Britain and Ireland, winning all three of his races including the National Stakes and the Dewhurst Stakes. In the following spring he won the Vauxhall Trial Stakes and the Tetrarch Stakes but was beaten when favourite for both the Irish 2,000 Guineas and the St James's Palace Stakes. He was then retired to stud but proved infertile and was returned to the track, winning one minor race in 1976.

== Background ==
Cellini was a "strongly-made, medium-sized" bay horse with white socks on his hind feet bred in Kentucky by Claiborne Farm. His sire Round Table was one of the most successful grass specialists in American racing history, winning forty-three races and being named Horse of the Year in 1958. He became a highly successful breeding stallion, being the Leading sire in North America in 1972. Cellini's dam Gamely was an outstanding racemare who was rated the best of her generation in the United States at the ages of three, four and five. She was one of numerous major winners to be descended from the British-bred broodmare Rough Shod.

On the death of Claiborne Farm's owner Arthur B. Hancock, Jr. in 1972 Cellini was offered for auction. He attracted strong interest from bidders including Alec Head and Bernard van Cutsem but was bought for $240,000 by the British Bloodstock Agency on behalf of Charles St George. The colt was sent to race in Europe and was sent into training with Vincent O'Brien at Ballydoyle. He was named after the sixteenth-century sculptor Benvenuto Cellini.

Cellini's background was remarkably similar to that of his contemporary Apalachee. Both horses were bred by Claiborne Farm and were sired by Round Table: both horses' dams (Moccasin and Gamely) were champion daughters of Bold Ruler and were respectively the daughter and granddaughter of Rough Shod: both were sold as yearlings and sent to Ireland to be trained by O'Brien.

== Racing career ==
=== 1973: two-year-old season ===
Cellini made successful racecourse debut by winning a maiden race over six and a half furlongs. He was then stepped up sharply in class for the National Stakes over seven furlongs at the Curragh Racecourse in September. Ridden by Lester Piggott he won easily by three lengths from the Paddy Prendergast-trained Haunt. On his third and final start of the year, Cellini was sent to England to contest the Group One Dewhurst Stakes at Newmarket Racecourse in October. With Piggott again in the saddle he was made the 40/85 favourite with his main opposition expected to come from Pitcairn who had finished second in the Middle Park Stakes earlier in the month. Cellini led from the start and drew away in the closing stages and won easily from Pitcairn with Gerard Street and Jupiter Pluvius in third and fourth.

=== 1974: three-year-old season ===
On his three-year-old debut Cellini won the Group Three Vauxhall Trial Stakes over seven furlongs at Phoenix Park Racecourse, beating Furry Glen by a head. With the O'Brien-trained Apalachee and Charles St George's Giacometti both targeting the 2000 Guineas, Cellini was aimed at the Irish 2,000 Guineas. In his trial for the race he contested the Tetrarch Stakes over seven furlongs at the Curragh and won by half a length from Red Alert, a colt who went on to take the Jersey Stakes and the Stewards' Cup. After five consecutive victories Cellini started the 11/10 favourite for Irish 2000 Guineas on 18 May, but finished third of the ten runners, beaten a head and three lengths by Furry Glen and Pitcairn. The colt made his second appearance in England when he started favourite for the St James's Palace Stakes at Royal Ascot in June. He was beaten two lengths into second place by the Clive Brittain-trained Averof, with the pair finishing well clear of the other runners. Cellini never raced again and was retired at the end of the year.

== Later career ==
At the end of his racing career Cellini was retired to become a breeding stallion at Gainesway Farm in Kentucky. He proved to be almost entirely infertile and was returned to the racetrack under the ownership of William S. Farish III. Trained by Del W. Carroll he raced in the United States in 1976, winning once in an allowance race at Delaware Park Racetrack in June from five starts.

== Assessment ==
There was no International Classification of European two-year-olds in 1973: the official handicappers of Britain, Ireland and France compiled separate rankings for horses which competed in those countries. In the British Free Handicap, Giacometti was assigned a weight of 127 pounds, placing him in third place behind Apalachee and Mississipian. The independent Timeform organisation gave him a rating of 125 p, (the "p" indicating that he was likely to make more than the usual improvement), twelve pounds below their top-rated two-year-old Apalachee. Despite the ratings, there were reports that Cellini was regarded as being at least as good as Apalachee by the Ballydoyle team. In the following year he was rated 118 by Timeform, commenting in their annual Racehorses of 1974 that he might have achieved more had he been allowed to compete over longer distances.

== Pedigree ==
Pedigree of Cellini (USA), bay stallion, 1971
Sire Round Table (USA) 1954	Princequillo (IRE); 1940	Prince Rose	Rose Prince
Sire Round Table (USA) 1954	Princequillo (IRE); 1940	Prince Rose	Indolence
Sire Round Table (USA) 1954	Princequillo (IRE); 1940	Cosquilla	Papyrus
Sire Round Table (USA) 1954	Princequillo (IRE); 1940	Cosquilla	Quick Thought
Sire Round Table (USA) 1954	Knight's Daughter (GB); 1941	Sir Cosmo	The Boss
Sire Round Table (USA) 1954	Knight's Daughter (GB); 1941	Sir Cosmo	Hayn Ali
Sire Round Table (USA) 1954	Knight's Daughter (GB); 1941	Feola	Friar Marcus
Sire Round Table (USA) 1954	Knight's Daughter (GB); 1941	Feola	Aloe
Dam Gamely (USA) 1964	Bold Ruler (USA); 1954	Nasrullah	Nearco
Dam Gamely (USA) 1964	Bold Ruler (USA); 1954	Nasrullah	Mumtaz Begum
Dam Gamely (USA) 1964	Bold Ruler (USA); 1954	Miss Disco	Discovery
Dam Gamely (USA) 1964	Bold Ruler (USA); 1954	Miss Disco	Outdone
Dam Gamely (USA) 1964	Gambetta (USA); 1952	My Babu	Djebel
Dam Gamely (USA) 1964	Gambetta (USA); 1952	My Babu	Perfume
Dam Gamely (USA) 1964	Gambetta (USA); 1952	Rough Shod	Gold Bridge
Dam Gamely (USA) 1964	Gambetta (USA); 1952	Rough Shod	Dalmary (Family: 5-h)
