= Katies =

Irish-bred Thoroughbred racehorse

- Sire: Nonoalco
- Grandsire: Nearctic
- Dam: Mortefontaine
- Damsire: Polic
- Sex: Mare
- Foaled: 22 April 1981
- Died: 22 August 2004 (aged 23); Taylor Made Farm, Nicholasville, Kentucky, USA
- Country: Ireland
- Colour: Bay or Brown
- Breeder: Mareco Ltd.
- Owner: Terry Ramsden
- Trainer: Mick Ryan
- Record: 10: 4-2-1

Major wins
- Irish 1000 Guineas (1984); Coronation Stakes (1984)

Awards
- Top-rated British three-year-old filly (1984); Timeform rating 85 (1983), 126 (1984)

Katies (22 April 1981 – 20 August 2004) was an Irish-bred, British-trained Thoroughbred racehorse and broodmare. After recording one minor win as a two-year-old she reached her peak in the spring and summer of the following year, taking major prizes in the Irish 1000 Guineas and the Coronation Stakes. At the end of the year she was rated the best three-year-old filly trained in Britain. After the end of her racing career she became a successful broodmare whose foals had great success in Japan.

== Background ==
Katies was a "big, rangy" bay or brown mare with a narrow white blaze bred in Ireland by Mareco Ltd. As a yearling she was sold at auction for 11,000 guineas and sent into training with Mick Ryan.

Katies' sire Nonoalco won the 2000 Guineas and the Prix Jacques Le Marois in 1974 and stood as a breeding stallion in Europe (siring Noalcoholic) before being exported to Japan. Her dam Mortefontaine was a winner of one minor race in France, a full-sister to the Nunthorpe Stakes winner Polyfoto and closely related to the dual Cambridgeshire Handicap winner Baronet. Apart from Katies she produced Millfontaine who won the Extel Handicap and the Winter Hill Stakes in 1983.

== Racing career ==
=== 1983: two-year-old season ===
Despite finishing unplaced over six furlongs on her racecourse debut, Katies then started at odds of 10/11 for a maiden race over 7 1/2 furlongs at Lingfield Park in October. She won by a length from the Geoff Wragg-trained Dusty Letter with the first two coming home well clear of the other eighteen runners. Later that month, on her only subsequent start of the year she finished unplaced in a race at Newbury.

=== 1984: three-year-old season ===
Katies finished unplaced on her first appearance as a three-year-old and then defeated the Henry Cecil-trained Ophrys by half a length in a minor race over seven furlongs at Leicester Racecourse in April. Later that month she finished third behind Kanz and Triagonal when moved up in class and distance for the Princess Elizabeth Stakes over 8 1/2 furlongs at Epsom Racecourse. She had looked likely to win the race before hanging badly to the right in the closings stages and was reported to have sustained a minor leg injury during the contest. Shortly after her defeat at Epsom she was bought for a reported £500,000 by Terry Ramsden. In May Katies was sent to Ireland and started at odds of 20/1 in a twenty-three runner field for the Irish 1000 Guineas over one mile at the Curragh in which she was ridden by Philip Robinson. After turning into the straight just behind the leaders she went to the front a quarter of a mile from the finish and accelerated two lengths clear of her rivals. She came under pressure in the closing stages but held on to win narrowly from Alianna, So Fine and Lady of the House, with Desirable in fifth, the favourite Masarika (Poule d'Essai des Pouliches) in sixth and the future Irish Oaks winner Princess Pati in seventh place. Robinson later commented that Katies might have won more easily had he not sent her to the front so early.

In June Katies was matched against the English 1000 Guineas winner Pebbles in the Coronation Stakes at Royal Ascot. Robinson was given the choice between the two Guineas winners and opted to partner Katies. The betting suggested that he had made the wrong choice as Pebbles started favourite ahead of Leipzig (runner-up in the Nell Gwyn Stakes) and So Fine with Katies going off the 11/2 fourth choice. The other runners included L'Orangerie (Prix Imprudence), Lady of the House and Desirable. Robinson settled his mount behind the leaders as Leipzig set a strong pace, and then moved up into second place behind Pebbles with two furlongs left to run. The two Guineas winners quickly drew away from the field with Katies proving the stronger, taking the lead inside the finsl furlong and winning by a length. There was a gap of 5 1/2 lengths back to So Fine who took third place ahead of Desirable.

Katies started odds-on favourite for the Child Stakes at Newmarket Racecourse in July but was beaten into second place by the 1000 Guineas runner-up Meis-El-Reem, to whom she was conceding six pounds in weight. On her final appearance of the season, Katies was matched against older horses and male opposition in the Queen Elizabeth II Stakes at Ascot Racecourse in September. Chief Singer started favourite with Katies the joint-second choice alongside the four-year-old gelding Teleprompter. She produced a strong finish but failed by a neck to overhaul Teleprompter having been slightly hampered by the winner in the closing stages. Philip Robinson lodged an objection but the result was allowed to stand by the racecourse stewards.

At the Goffs sale in November Katies was put up for sale but was withdrawn by her vendor after the bidding had reached 2,800,000 guineas.

== Assessment ==
In their annual Racehorses of 1983 the independent Timeform organization gave her a rating of 85, making her more than thirty pounds inferior to the best fillies of her generation while commenting that she would "stay 1m".

In the official International Classification for 1984 Katies was give a rating of 84, making her the second best three-year-old filly in Europe behind Northern Trick and the best filly of her generation trained in Britain. Timeform rated her on 126, five pounds behind Northern Trick and two pounds ahead of Pebbles.

== Breeding record ==
Katies was retired from racing to become a broodmare. Although she was based in the United States for the rest of her life, her stock were most successful in Japan. She was sold twice at auction, fetching $1,000,000 in 1989 and $625,000 in 1998. She produced at least fourteen foals and eleven winners between 1987 and 2004:

- Katies First, a bay filly, foaled in 1987, sired by Kris. Won four races including the Listed Remembrance Day Stakes and Prix du Cercle. Grand-dam of Admire Moon and Efforia.
- Jet Route, bay filly, 1988, by Alydar
- What Katy Did, bay filly, 1989, by Nureyev, Won three races including the Listed Prix Tantieme. Dam of Sleepless Night.
- Hishi Alydar, bay colt, 1990, by Alydar. Won five races.
- Hishi Amazon, dark bay or brown filly, 1991, by Theatrical. Won ten races including Hanshin Juvenile Fillies and Queen Elizabeth II Commemorative Cup.
- Hishi Fujiyama, bay colt, 1992, by Bering. Won one race.
- Hishi Easter, bay colt, 1993, by Seattle Dancer. Won three races.
- Hishi Nile, dark bay or brown filly, 1994, by A.P. Indy. Won two races including Grade III Fairy Stakes.
- Hishi Reihou, dark bay or brown filly, 1995, by Dayjur. Won four races.
- Hishi Pinnacle, dark bay or brown filly, 1996, by Theatrical, Won four races including the Grade II Rose Stakes.
- Machikane Ukon, dark bay or brown colt, 1999, by Theatrical. Won one race.
- Word of Mouth, dark bay or brown filly, 2000, by Saint Ballado
- Lord Ranger, dark bay or brown colt, 2001, by Forestry. Won two races.
- Broadway Bound, bay colt, 2004, by Theatrical

She died on 20 August 2004 at Taylor Made Farm near Nicholasville, Kentucky at the age of 23, where she is buried.

== Pedigree ==
Pedigree of Katies (IRE), bay or brown mare, 1981
Sire Nonoalco (USA) 1971	Nearctic (CAN); 1954	Nearco	Pharos
Sire Nonoalco (USA) 1971	Nearctic (CAN); 1954	Nearco	Nogara
Sire Nonoalco (USA) 1971	Nearctic (CAN); 1954	Lady Angela	Hyperion
Sire Nonoalco (USA) 1971	Nearctic (CAN); 1954	Lady Angela	Sister Sarah
Sire Nonoalco (USA) 1971	Seximee (USA); 1966	Hasty Road	Roman
Sire Nonoalco (USA) 1971	Seximee (USA); 1966	Hasty Road	Traffic Court
Sire Nonoalco (USA) 1971	Seximee (USA); 1966	Jambo	Crafty Admiral
Sire Nonoalco (USA) 1971	Seximee (USA); 1966	Jambo	Bank Account
Dam Mortefontaine (FR) 1969	Polic (FR); 1953	Relic	War Relic
Dam Mortefontaine (FR) 1969	Polic (FR); 1953	Relic	Bridal Colors
Dam Mortefontaine (FR) 1969	Polic (FR); 1953	Polaire	Le Volcan
Dam Mortefontaine (FR) 1969	Polic (FR); 1953	Polaire	Stella Polaris
Dam Mortefontaine (FR) 1969	Brabantia (GB); 1953	Honeyway	Fairway
Dam Mortefontaine (FR) 1969	Brabantia (GB); 1953	Honeyway	Honey Buzzard
Dam Mortefontaine (FR) 1969	Brabantia (GB); 1953	Porthaven	Portlaw
Dam Mortefontaine (FR) 1969	Brabantia (GB); 1953	Porthaven	Peaceful Light (Family 7-f)
