= Right Tack =

Irish-bred Thoroughbred racehorse (1966–1985)

- Sire: Hard Tack
- Grandsire: Hard Sauce
- Dam: Polly Macaw
- Damsire: Polly's Jet
- Sex: Stallion
- Foaled: 1966
- Country: Ireland
- Colour: Bay
- Breeder: Paul Larkin
- Owner: J. R. Brown
- Trainer: John Sutcliffe
- Record: 12:8-3-0
- Earnings: £59,843

Major wins
- Middle Park Stakes (1968); 2000 Guineas (1969); Irish 2000 Guineas (1969); St. James's Palace Stakes (1969); Timeform rating: 131
- Last updated on 16 September 2023

Right Tack (1966–1985) was an Irish-bred, British-trained Thoroughbred racehorse and sire. In a career that lasted from June 1968 to October 1969, he ran twelve times, winning eight races and finishing second three times. As a two-year-old, he won his last five races, including the Middle Park Stakes, and was rated the second-best British colt of his generation. In the following year, Right Tack became the first horse to win both the 2000 Guineas at Newmarket and the Irish 2000 Guineas at the Curragh. After being retired from racing, he stood as a breeding stallion in Ireland and Australia.

== Background ==
Right Tack was a bay horse bred in County Meath, Ireland by Paul Larkin. As a weanling, he was sent to the Dublin November sales where he was bought for 700 guineas by Philip O'Dwyer. A year later, O'Dwyer was able to make a profit on the deal when he sold Right Tack for 3,200 guineas at the Doncaster yearling sale. The colt was bought by bloodstock agents acting on behalf of Jim Brown, a Dublin-based Englishman who sent him to be trained at Epsom by John Sutcliffe.

Right Tack was sired by Hard Tack out of the mare Polly Macaw. Hard Tack was a well-bred and talented horse whose racing career was cut short by his problematic temperament, which made him difficult to train: he was awarded the § or "squiggle" symbol by Timeform for being unreliable and inconsistent. Polly Macaw won five races but all of them were low-grade sprints and most of her career was spent in selling races. When she was sold at the end of her racing career, Polly Macaw's price was 220 guineas: following Right Tack's success she was sold again for 20,000 guineas.

== Racing career ==
=== 1968: two-year-old season ===
Right Tack made his first appearance at his home course in June when he finished second in the Caterham Stakes at The Derby meeting. He won his first race shortly afterwards when he took the Southgate Stakes over five furlongs at Alexandra Park ridden by Joe Mercer. Further wins followed in minor races at Windsor and Epsom and the Imperial Stakes at Kempton Park Racecourse. On his final start of the year, Right Tack was sent to Newmarket where he won the Middle Park Stakes, one of the season's most important two-year-old races in which, ridden by Geoff Lewis, he defeated Tower Walk by half a length. In the Free Handicap, a ranking of the year's best juveniles, Right Tack was given a rating of 131 pounds, making him officially the second-best colt of his generation behind the American-bred Dewhurst Stakes winner Ribofilio (133).

=== 1969: three-year-old season ===
Right Tack began his three-year-old season in the Greenham Stakes at Newbury, a recognised trial race for the 2000 Guineas. He finished second to Tower Walk, to whom he was conceding five pounds. Ribofilio, ridden by Lester Piggott was a strong favourite for the "Guineas" at Newmarket on 30 April, but Right Tack was also well supported and went off the 15/2 second choice in the betting. Ribofilio ran inexplicably poorly (there was speculation that he had been drugged) and was virtually pulled up by Piggott as Right Tack, ridden by Geoff Lewis won decisively by two and a half lengths from Tower Walk with Welsh Pageant in third. At the Curragh Racecourse near Dublin two weeks later, Right Tack became the first winner of the 2000 Guineas to win the Irish 2000 Guineas as he won impressively by two and a half lengths form Hotfoot. Right Tack returned to England for the St. James's Palace Stakes at Royal Ascot in June. He overcame interference to win by half a length from Habitat in a particularly rough race, which led to the runner-up's jockey, Lester Piggott, being given a seven-day suspension. After this race, Right Tack contracted a respiratory infection and did not run again for three months.

Right Tack returned to the racecourse in September but was unable to reproduce his best form. An attempt to move up to middle distances ended in failure as he was beaten by Principal Boy in the Peter Hastings Stakes over ten furlongs at Newbury. On his final start, he traveled to France for the Prix du Moulin at Longchamp and finished unplaced for the first time in his career as he ran seventh behind Habitat. He was then syndicated and retired to stud.

== Assessment ==
In 1969 Timeform gave Right Tack a rating of 131, making him the equal fifth-best European horse of the year alongside Nijinsky and Park Top, three pounds behind the top-rated Habitat.

== Stud career ==
Right Tack began his stud career in his native Ireland. In his first season at stud, he sired Take A Reef, the top-rated British three-year-old of 1974. On 1 December 1976, he was auctioned at Newmarket where he was sold for 70,000 guineas, a record for a stallion, and was exported to Australia to stand as a stallion at the Glenhope Stud in Victoria. He made little impact at his new base and died on 4 May 1985. Although Right Tack was not a success as a sire of winners, he exerted some influence on future generations through his daughter Mofida who produced Zaizafon, the dam of the 2000 Guineas winner Zafonic and the successful stallion Zamindar.

== Pedigree ==
Pedigree of Right Tack (GB), bay stallion, 1966
Sire Hard Tack (GB) 1955	Hard Sauce; 1948	Ardan	Pharis
Sire Hard Tack (GB) 1955	Hard Sauce; 1948	Ardan	Adargatis
Sire Hard Tack (GB) 1955	Hard Sauce; 1948	Saucy Bella	Bellacose
Sire Hard Tack (GB) 1955	Hard Sauce; 1948	Saucy Bella	Marmite
Sire Hard Tack (GB) 1955	Cowes; 1949	Blue Peter	Fairway
Sire Hard Tack (GB) 1955	Cowes; 1949	Blue Peter	Fancy Free
Sire Hard Tack (GB) 1955	Cowes; 1949	Lighthearted	Hyperion
Sire Hard Tack (GB) 1955	Cowes; 1949	Lighthearted	Merry Devon
Dam Polly Macaw (IRE) 1959	Polly's Jet; 1953	Polynesian	Unbreakable
Dam Polly Macaw (IRE) 1959	Polly's Jet; 1953	Polynesian	Black Polly
Dam Polly Macaw (IRE) 1959	Polly's Jet; 1953	Mary's Dell	Case Ace
Dam Polly Macaw (IRE) 1959	Polly's Jet; 1953	Mary's Dell	Pixey Dell
Dam Polly Macaw (IRE) 1959	Listowel; 1953	Solonaway	Solferino
Dam Polly Macaw (IRE) 1959	Listowel; 1953	Solonaway	Anyway
Dam Polly Macaw (IRE) 1959	Listowel; 1953	Lady Fairford	Fairford
Dam Polly Macaw (IRE) 1959	Listowel; 1953	Lady Fairford	Pure Gaiety (Family:10-a)
