= Rousillon (horse) =

Thoroughbred racehorse trained in Britain

- Sire: Riverman
- Grandsire: Never Bend
- Dam: Belle Dorine
- Damsire: Marshua's Dancer
- Sex: Stallion
- Foaled: 10 April 1981
- Country: United States
- Colour: Brown
- Breeder: William Stamps Farish III
- Owner: Khalid Abdulla
- Trainer: Guy Harwood
- Record: 13: 7-1-1

Major wins
- 2000 Guineas Trial Stakes (1984); Waterford Crystal Mile (1984); Queen Anne Stakes (1985); Sussex Stakes (1985); Prix du Moulin (1985)

Awards
- Timeform rating 124 (1983), 124§ (1984), 133 (1985)

Rousillon (10 April 1981 – 26 October 2009) was an American bred, British-trained Thoroughbred racehorse and sire. A difficult, temperamental and unpredictable horse, he was a specialist over the one mile distance, winning seven of his thirteen race between August 1983 and November 1985. He won the 2000 Guineas Trial Stakes and the Waterford Crystal Mile as a three-year-old in 1984 before reaching his peak in the following season when he won the Queen Anne Stakes, Sussex Stakes and the Prix du Moulin. He was retired to stud after his four-year-old season and had some success as a sire of winners. He is the sire of champion thoroughbred Vintage Crop.

== Background ==
Rousillon was a dark bay or brown horse with no white markings bred in Kentucky by W. L. Jones and William Stamps Farish III. He was sired by Riverman an American-bred, French-trained who won the Poule d'Essai des Poulains and the Prix Jean Prat in 1972. Riverman went on to become a highly successful stallion, whose offspring included Triptych, Irish River, Gold River and Bahri. Rousillon's dam Belle Dorine never won a race but was a half-sister to several winners..

As a yearling, Rousillon was sent to the Fasig-Tipton Summer sale where he was bought for $100,000 by representatives of the Saudi prince Khalid Abdulla. The colt was sent into training with Guy Harwood at Pulborough. At the time, Harwood was noted for his modern approach to training, introducing Britain to features such as artificial gallops and barn-style stabling.

== Racing career ==
=== 1983: two-year-old season ===
Rousillon began his racing career in the Plantation Maiden Stakes over seven furlongs at Newmarket Racecourse in August. He started favourite in a field of twenty-five runners and won easily by two lengths from Timber Merchant. In September he was moved up in distance for the Westhampnett Stakes over one mile at Goodwood Racecourse and won again, "trouncing" a strong field which included the future Melbourne Cup winner At Talaq. On 24 September, Rousillon started 6/5 favourite for the Group Two Royal Lodge Stakes over one mile at Ascot Racecourse. He took the lead in the straight and looked likely to win easily, but appeared to "go to pieces" in the final furlong and was beaten two lengths by Gold and Ivory.

=== 1984: three-year-old season ===
Rousillon began his three-year-old season in the 2000 Guineas Trial over seven furlongs at Salisbury Racecourse in April. He started favourite and won by a length from Chief Singer, with the two finishing well clear of the other runners. He was then sent to France to contest the Poule d'Essai des Poulains over 1600 metres at Longchamp Racecourse. He lost several lengths at the start before finishing strongly to take sixth place, three lengths behind the winner Siberian Express. In the Irish 2,000 Guineas at the Curragh in May he started second favourite, but after moving forward in the straight he failed to persevere with his effort and finished fifth behind Sadler's Wells. As in some of his previous races, Rousillon raced with his head at a high, crooked angle, giving the impression that he was ungenuine and temperamental.

In July, Rousillon met Chief Singer again in the Sussex Stakes over one mile at Goodwood Racecourse. In a rough and controversial race, Rousillon finished second by half a length to Chief Singer but was disqualified and placed last for causing interference to the winner in the closing stages. Greville Starkey was given a fourteen-day riding ban by the disciplinary committee of the Jockey Club. Rousillon then contested the Waterford Crystal Mile at Goodwood in September. He started the 8/13 favourite and won by half a length from Prego although Starkey appeared unwilling to use his whip on the winner, who seemed reluctant to continue his run after taking the lead. Rousillon's last race of the year was the Prix de la Forêt over 1400 metres at Longchamp in October. He took the lead in the straight and looked likely to win easily but slowed abruptly and veered to the left in the closing stages, finishing third behind Procida and Nikos.

=== 1985: four-year-old season ===
In 1985, the Harwood stable decided to use Cataldi (a colt rated 112 by Timeform) as Rousillon's pacemaker. Rousillon made his seasonal debut in the Queen Anne Stakes (then a Group Two race) over one mile at Royal Ascot. Ridden as usual by Starkey, he took the lead inside the final furlong and accelerated clear to win by two and a half lengths from Celestial Bounty. Timeform described his performance as being "smooth as silk". On 31 July Rousillon ran for the second time in the Sussex Stakes and started the 2/1 joint favourite alongside Bairn, a three-year-old colt who had finished second to Shadeed in the 2000 Guineas before winning the St James's Palace Stakes. Cataldi set a strong pace before dropping away in the straight. Rousillon took the lead a furlong from the finish and won in convincing style by two and a half lengths from Bairn.

In September, Rousillon and Cataldi were sent to France to contest the Prix du Moulin over 1600 metres at Longchamp. The field included the leading French-trained milers Procida, Vin de France (winner of the Prix Jacques Le Marois), No Pass No Sale (Poule d'Essai des Poulains) and Silvermine (Poule d'Essai des Poulains). Cataldi led until the straight before being overtaken by Vin de France and Heraldiste. Rousillon moved up on the outside, took the lead 200 metres from the finish and won decisively by one and a half lengths from the filly Kozana. Rousillon' last race was the Breeders' Cup Mile at Aqueduct Racetrack where he started the 3/1 favourite. Timeform described the race as a disaster for Rousillon: he walked out of the starting stalls and had to be hard ridden by Starkey to make up the lost ground. After moving into contention he was badly hampered when Palace Music veered to the right and eventually finished ninth behind Cozzene.

== Assessment ==
In 1983, the independent Timeform organisation gave Rousillon a rating of 124, seven pounds below their top-rated two-year-old El Gran Senor. In the following year he was given a rating of 124§, the "§" or "squiggle" indicate that in Timeform's opinion he was "somewhat ungenerous, faint-hearted or a bit of a coward". In the official International Classification he was rated sixteen pounds below the top-rated El Gran Senor. In 1985 Rousillon was given a Timeform rating of 133, three pound below the season's top-rated horse, Slip Anchor. In the International Classification he was rated the twelfth-best racehorse in Europe.

== Stud record ==
Rousillon was retired from racing to become a breeding stallion at the British National Stud at a fee of £12,500. He had been syndicated at £120,000 a share, giving him a theoretical value of £4.8 million. His most successful offspring was the Melbourne Cup winner Vintage Crop, whilst his other progeny included the leading American turf runner Fastness (twice winner of the Eddie Read Handicap), the Kawasaki Kinen winner Intelli Power and the Jersey Stakes winner Sally Rous. Exported to Japan in 1991, Rousillon stood at the JBBA Shizunai and Shichinohe Stallion Stations before he was pensioned in 2005. He died on 26 October 2009 of natural causes at the Nasu Stallion Station.

== Pedigree ==
Pedigree of Rousillon (USA), brown stallion, 1981
Sire Riverman (USA) 1969	Never Bend (USA); 1960	Nasrullah	Nearco
Sire Riverman (USA) 1969	Never Bend (USA); 1960	Nasrullah	Mumtaz Begum
Sire Riverman (USA) 1969	Never Bend (USA); 1960	Lalun	Djeddah
Sire Riverman (USA) 1969	Never Bend (USA); 1960	Lalun	Be Faithful
Sire Riverman (USA) 1969	River Lady (USA); 1963	Prince John	Princequillo
Sire Riverman (USA) 1969	River Lady (USA); 1963	Prince John	Not Afraid
Sire Riverman (USA) 1969	River Lady (USA); 1963	Nile Lily	Roman
Sire Riverman (USA) 1969	River Lady (USA); 1963	Nile Lily	Azalea
Dam Belle Dorine (USA) 1977	Marshua's Dancer (USA); 1968	Raise a Native	Native Dancer
Dam Belle Dorine (USA) 1977	Marshua's Dancer (USA); 1968	Raise a Native	Raise You
Dam Belle Dorine (USA) 1977	Marshua's Dancer (USA); 1968	Marshua	Nashua
Dam Belle Dorine (USA) 1977	Marshua's Dancer (USA); 1968	Marshua	Emardee
Dam Belle Dorine (USA) 1977	Palsy Walsy (USA); 1960	Sea o' Erin	Shannon
Dam Belle Dorine (USA) 1977	Palsy Walsy (USA); 1960	Sea o' Erin	Chantress
Dam Belle Dorine (USA) 1977	Palsy Walsy (USA); 1960	Allie's Pal	War Dog
Dam Belle Dorine (USA) 1977	Palsy Walsy (USA); 1960	Allie's Pal	Our Cherrycote (Family 8-k)
