= Leopardstown Stakes =

- Class: Group 3
- Location: Leopardstown; County Dublin, Ireland
- Final run: 31 October 1994
- Race type: Flat / Thoroughbred
- Website: Leopardstown

Race information
- Distance: 7f (1,408 metres)
- Surface: Turf
- Track: Left-handed
- Qualification: Two-year-olds

The Leopardstown Stakes was a Group 3 flat horse race in Ireland open to two-year-old thoroughbreds. It was run at Leopardstown over a distance of 7 furlongs (1,408 metres), and it was scheduled to take place each year in late October.

== History ==
The event was formerly known as the Mullion Stakes. It used to be staged in late July or early August. For a period it held Listed status.

The race became known as the Ardenode Stud Stakes in the early 1980s. It was promoted to Group 3 level and switched to late October in 1984. It was subsequently called the Leopardstown Stakes. It was discontinued after 1994.

== Records ==
Leading jockey since 1986 (2 wins):

- Dermot Hogan – Antic Boy (1986), Foresee (1992)
- David Parnell – Tursanah (1988), Tanwi (1989)

Leading trainer since 1986 (3 wins):

- John Oxx – Antic Boy (1986), Foresee (1992), Cajarian (1993)

== Winners 1986–94 ==
Year	Winner	Jockey	Trainer	Time
1986	Antic Boy	Dermot Hogan	John Oxx
1987	Careafolie	Michael Kinane	Dermot Weld
1988	Tursanah	David Parnell	Kevin Prendergast	1:32.00
1989	Tanwi	David Parnell	Kevin Prendergast	1:29.70
1990	Kooyonga	Wayne Harris	Michael Kauntze	1:30.60
1991	Swing Low	Stephen Craine	Richard Hannon Sr.	1:31.70
1992	Foresee	Dermot Hogan	John Oxx	1:33.30
1993	Cajarian	Johnny Murtagh	John Oxx	1:30.80
1994	Jahid	Pat Shanahan	Dermot Weld	1:34.30

== Earlier winners ==
- 1971: All Spirit
- 1972: Chamozzle
- 1973: Furry Glen
- 1974: Piping Rock
- 1975: Icing
- 1976: Captain James
- 1977: Fujiwara
- 1978: Magic North
- 1979: Nazwa
- 1980: Light Here
- 1981: Fly Start
- 1982: Burslem
- 1983: Executive Pride
- 1984: Leading Counsel
- 1985: Toca Madera

== See also ==
- List of Irish flat horse races
