= 2,000 Guineas Trial Stakes =

Discontinued horse race in Britain

- Class: Group 3
- Location: Ascot / Salisbury; England
- Final run: 9 April 1986
- Race type: Flat / Thoroughbred

Race information
- Distance: 7f (1,408 metres)
- Surface: Turf
- Qualification: Three-year-old colts and geldings
- Purse: £20,000 (1986); 1st: £14,104

The 2,000 Guineas Trial Stakes was a Group 3 flat horse race in Great Britain open to three-year-old thoroughbred colts and geldings. It was run over a distance of 7 furlongs (1,408 metres), and it was scheduled to take place each year in early April.

== History ==
The event was originally held at Ascot. The present grading system was introduced in 1971, and the race was classed at Group 3 level. It was staged at Newmarket in 1978, and transferred to Salisbury in 1979. It was discontinued after 1986.

The race served as a trial for the 2000 Guineas Stakes. The last horse to win both events was Sir Ivor in 1968.

The equivalent race for fillies was the 1,000 Guineas Trial Stakes.

== Records ==
Leading jockey (5 wins):

- Greville Starkey – Recitation (1981), Hays (1982), Proclaim (1983), Rousillon (1984), Zahdam (1986)

Leading trainer (5 wins):

- Guy Harwood – Recitation (1981), Hays (1982), Proclaim (1983), Rousillon (1984), Zahdam (1986)

== Winners ==
Year	Winner	Jockey	Trainer
1968	Sir Ivor	Lester Piggott	Vincent O'Brien
1969	Ribofilio	Joe Mercer	Fulke Johnson Houghton
1970	Pithiviers	J. J. Miller	Paddy Prendergast
1971	Good Bond	Jimmy Lindley	Ryan Price
1972	Grey Mirage	Richard Marshall	Bill Marshall
1973	Midsummer Star	Bill Williamson	Mick Masson
1974	Habat	Pat Eddery	Peter Walwyn
1975	Abandoned due to waterlogging
1976	Relkino	Joe Mercer	Dick Hern
1977	The Minstrel	Lester Piggott	Vincent O'Brien
1978	Derrylin	Eric Eldin	Doug Smith
1979	Lake City	Brian Taylor	Ryan Price
1980	Poyle Crusher	Taffy Thomas	Eddie Reavey
1981	Recitation	Greville Starkey	Guy Harwood
1982	Hays	Greville Starkey	Guy Harwood
1983	Proclaim	Greville Starkey	Guy Harwood
1984	Rousillon	Greville Starkey	Guy Harwood
1985	Lidhame	Willie Carson	John Dunlop
1986	Zahdam	Greville Starkey	Guy Harwood

== See also ==
- Horse racing in Great Britain
- List of British flat horse races
