= Vauxhall Trial Stakes =

- Class: Group 3
- Location: Phoenix Park Racecourse; Dublin, Ireland
- Race type: Flat / Thoroughbred

Race information
- Distance: 7 furlongs
- Surface: Turf
- Qualification: Three-year-olds

The Vauxhall Trial Stakes was an Irish Thoroughbred horse race run annually at Phoenix Park Racecourse in Dublin. Raced on turf, the seven furlong event was open to three-year-old horses. A Group III event, the race ended when financial difficulties resulted in the track closing for racing in late 1990.

Notable winners of the Vauxhall Trial Stakes included Roberto (1972), Thatch (1973), Cellini (1974), Sea Break (1975), Try My Best (1975) and Nikoli (1980).
