= Phoenix Park Racecourse =

Former horse racing venue in the Republic of Ireland

Coordinates: 53.372499°N 6.337566°W

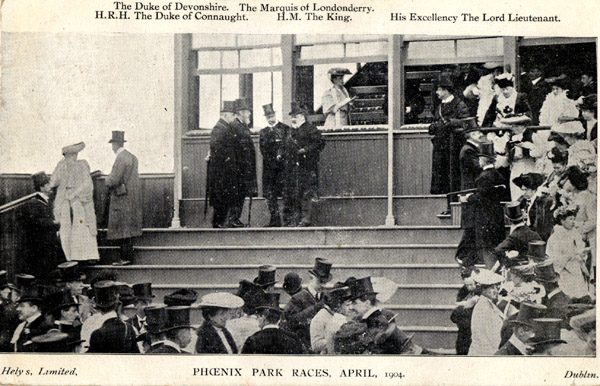
Postcard showing King Edward VII attended the races in 1904

Phoenix Park Racecourse was a horse racing venue in Ireland. It was located in the townlands of Ashtown and Castleknock in the civil parish of Castleknock on the northern edge of the Phoenix Park in Dublin. The course was founded by JHH Peard, and racing began there in 1902.

== History ==
From 1939 to 1950 the track was managed by Mr Peard's son Harry, and thereafter it was run by his widow Fanny. Mrs Peard retired in 1969, and the track closed for the first time at the end of the 1981 season. The course re-opened for the 1983 season, owned by a consortium that included Vincent O'Brien and Robert Sangster. Due to financial difficulties the track was permanently closed for racing in late 1990 and part of the land has subsequently been developed into housing.

== Racing events ==
Several of Ireland's leading flat races, which later were contested at other venues, originally took place at Phoenix Park. These include the Irish Champion Stakes and the Phoenix Stakes. Other races of note held at Phoenix Park include the G III Vauxhall Trial Stakes.

== Other events ==
On 14 August 1983, U2 played to 15,000 people at a nine-hour concert at the racecourse as part of the band's War Tour international concert tour. The supporting acts were Perfect Crime, Steel Pulse, Big Country, Eurythmics and Simple Minds.
