= Apalachee (horse) =

American-bred Thoroughbred racehorse

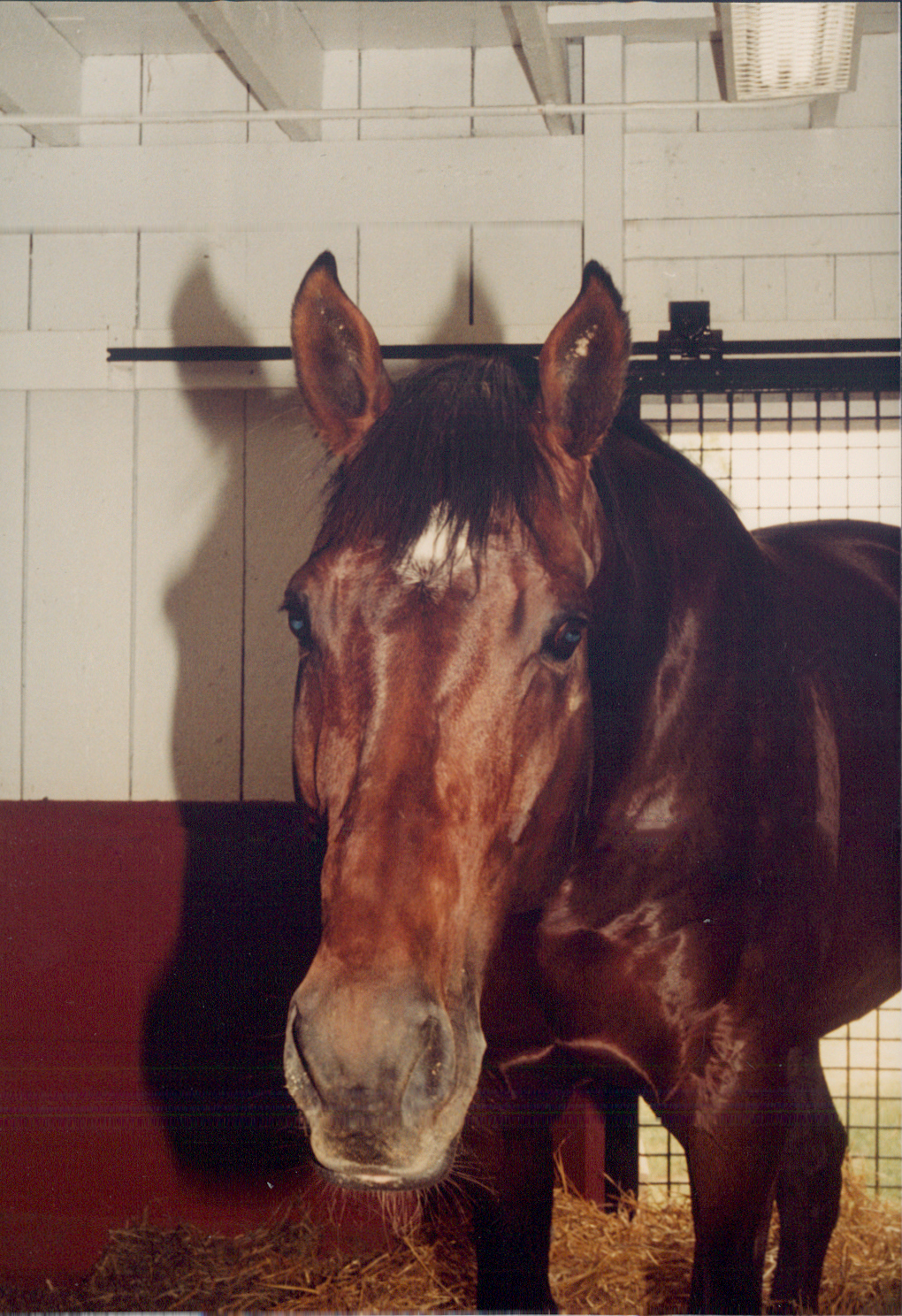
- Apalachee at Gainesway Farm in 1981
- Sire: Round Table
- Grandsire: Princequillo
- Dam: Moccasin
- Damsire: Nantallah
- Sex: Stallion
- Foaled: 8 February 1971
- Country: United States
- Colour: Bay
- Breeder: Claiborne Farm
- Owner: J. A. Mulcahy
- Trainer: Vincent O'Brien
- Record: 5:4-0-1

Major wins
- Observer Gold Cup (1973); Gladness Stakes (1974)

Awards
- Top-rated British & Irish two-year-old (1973); Timeform Top-rated horse (joint) (1973); Timeform rating 137

Apalachee (1971–1996) was an American-bred, Irish-trained Thoroughbred racehorse and sire. In a racing career which lasted from August 1973 until May 1974 he ran five times and won four races. In 1973 he was unbeaten in three starts including the Racing Post Trophy and was officially rated the best two-year-old in Britain and Ireland. In the following year he won on his debut but finished third to Nonoalco in the 2000 Guineas and never raced again. He was then retired to stud where he had some success as a sire of winners before his death at the age of twenty-five.

== Background ==
Apalachee was a tall, long-striding bay horse with a white star and one white foot, bred by Claiborne Farm in Kentucky. He was the product of a mating between two American Horses of the Year: Round Table and Moccasin. Round Table was one of the most successful grass specialists in American racing history, winning forty-three races and being named Horse of the Year in 1958. He became a highly successful breeding stallion, being the Leading sire in North America in 1972. Moccasin was named Horse of the Year as a two-year-old filly in 1965, when she was unbeaten in eight races. She came from the same branch of Thoroughbred family 5-h which produced Ridan, Thatch, Nureyev, Fairy King and Sadler's Wells. Apalachee's full brother, Brahms, won the Group 3 Railway Stakes at the Curragh.

Apalachee entered into the ownership of John Mulcahy and was sent to race in Europe. He was trained by Vincent O'Brien at his Ballydoyle stable in County Tipperary, Ireland.

== Racing career ==
=== 1973: two-year-old season ===
Apalachee made his first appearance in the Lee Stakes at the Curragh in August. Racing against moderate opposition he won by six lengths without being placed under any pressure. A month later at the same course he won the Moy Maiden Stakes in similar fashion.

In October Apalachee was moved up markedly in class when he was sent to England to contest the Group One Observer Gold Cup over one mile at Doncaster Racecourse. With prize money of £43,000, the race was the most valuable two-year-old race ever run in Britain. The opposition was headed by Nelson Bunker Hunt's Mississipian, an American-bred, French-trained colt who had won the Grand Critérium at Longchamp Racecourse. Ridden by Lester Piggott, Apalachee moved to the front two furlongs from the finish with Mississipian emerging as his only challenger. In the closing stages he pulled clear to win easily by two lengths from the French colt, with a gap of ten lengths back to Alpine Nephew in third. The unplaced horses included the future Group One winners Snow Knight (Derby), Busiris (Prix Royal Oak) and Mount Hagen (Prix du Moulin).

In the Free Handicap, a ranking of the year's best two-year-olds, Apalachee was given top weight of 133 pounds, five pounds clear of Mississipian. He was made a strong favourite for the following year's 2000 Guineas and Epsom Derby.

=== 1974: three-year-old season ===
Apalachee began his three-year-old season by winning the Group Three Gladness Stakes over seven furlongs at the Curragh in April. He was then sent to England for the 2000 Guineas over the Rowley Mile course at Newmarket Racecourse on 4 May. With Piggott in the saddle, he started at odds of 4/9 against eleven opponents, making him the shortest-priced favourite since Colombo in 1934. His support in the betting market was despite rumours that he had developed respiratory problems and his unimpressive appearance before the start. In the race he briefly led two furlongs from the finish but finished third behind Nonoalco and Giacometti. Apalachee was withdrawn from the Derby after performing poorly in a training gallop at Ballydoyle. He never raced again and was retired to stud with a valuation of $2 million.

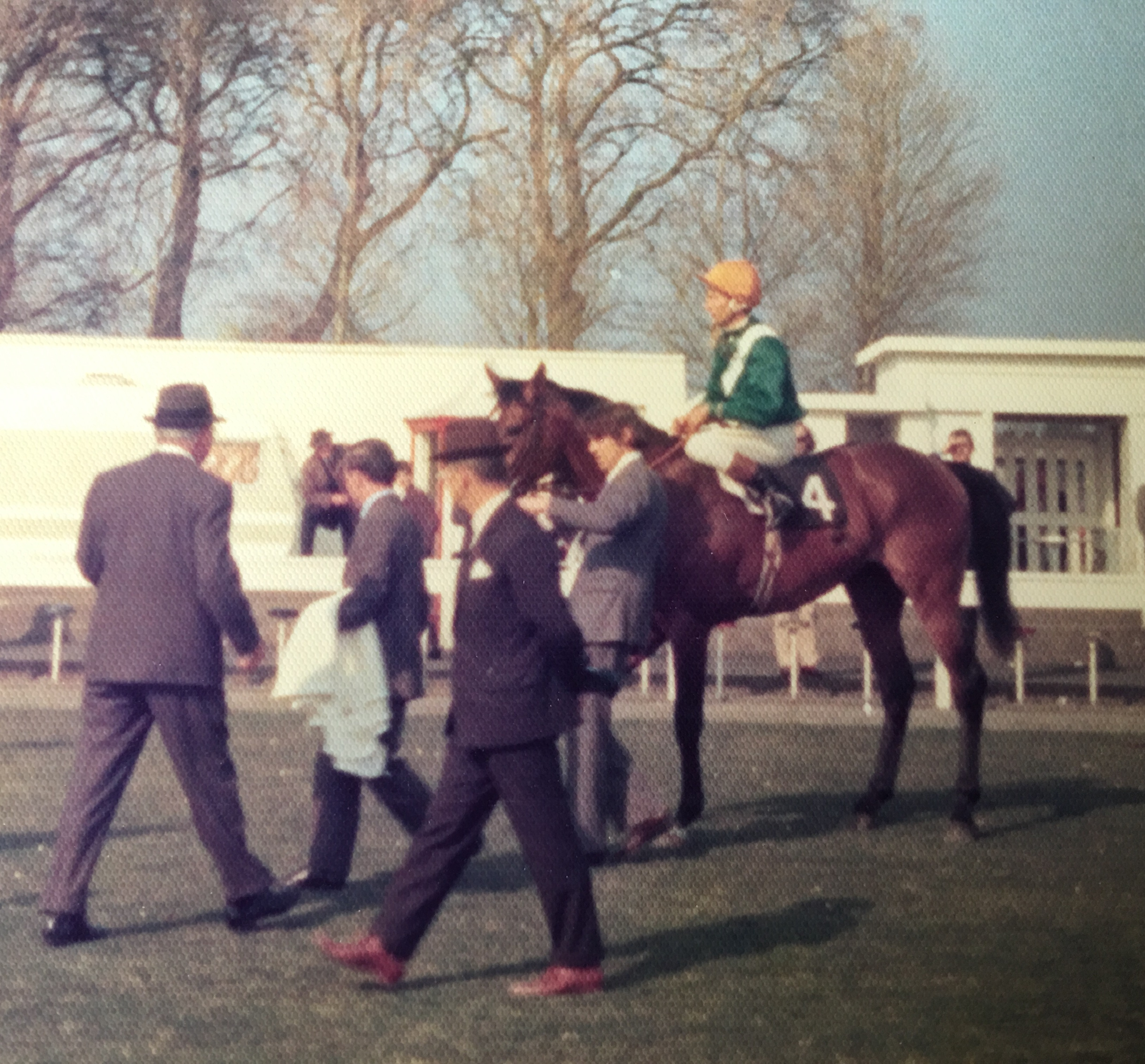
Owner John Mulcahy greets Apalachee & Lester Piggott after their victory in the Gladness Stakes at the Curragh in 1974

== Assessment ==
As noted above, Apalachee was officially rated the best two-year-old in Britain in 1973 by a margin of five pounds. The independent Timeform organisation were even more impressed with the colt, giving him a rating of 137 which made him not only the season's best two-year-old, but the joint-best horse of any age to race in Europe in 1973 (equal with Rheingold). The Timeform annual Racehorses of 1973 commented "we have not seen a two-year-old as promising as this for many years". Vincent O'Brien called him "a horse apart".

In their book A Century of Champions, based on a modified version of the Timeform system, John Randall and Tony Morris rated Apalachee the twenty-first best British or Irish two-year-old of the 20th Century.

== Stud career ==
Apalachee returned to the United States where he had a long and reasonably successful stud career at Gainesway Farm in Kentucky. He was particularly noted as a sire of sprinters. His winners included Dance for Donna (Canadian Champion Older Female Horse), Apalachee Honey (Sorority Stakes), Up the Apalachee (Alabama Stakes), Pine Tree Lane (Carter Handicap) and K One King (Oaklawn Handicap). He was the damsire of the American Champion Sprint Horse Artax. He continued to cover mares until being pensioned from stud duties in 1996 and died later that year.

== Sire line tree ==
- Apalachee
  - High Counsel
  - K One King
    - Halel

== Pedigree ==
Pedigree of Apalachee (USA), bay stallion, 1971
Sire Round Table (USA) 1954	Princequillo (IRE); 1940	Prince Rose	Rose Prince
Sire Round Table (USA) 1954	Princequillo (IRE); 1940	Prince Rose	Indolence
Sire Round Table (USA) 1954	Princequillo (IRE); 1940	Cosquilla	Papyrus
Sire Round Table (USA) 1954	Princequillo (IRE); 1940	Cosquilla	Quick Thought
Sire Round Table (USA) 1954	Knight's Daughter (GB); 1941	Sir Cosmo	The Boss*
Sire Round Table (USA) 1954	Knight's Daughter (GB); 1941	Sir Cosmo	Hayn Ali
Sire Round Table (USA) 1954	Knight's Daughter (GB); 1941	Feola	Friar Marcus
Sire Round Table (USA) 1954	Knight's Daughter (GB); 1941	Feola	Aloe
Dam Moccasin (USA) 1963	Nantallah (USA); 1953	Nasrullah	Nearco
Dam Moccasin (USA) 1963	Nantallah (USA); 1953	Nasrullah	Mumtaz Begum
Dam Moccasin (USA) 1963	Nantallah (USA); 1953	Shimmer	Flares
Dam Moccasin (USA) 1963	Nantallah (USA); 1953	Shimmer	Broad Ripple
Dam Moccasin (USA) 1963	Rough Shod (GB); 1944	Gold Bridge	Golden Boss*
Dam Moccasin (USA) 1963	Rough Shod (GB); 1944	Gold Bridge	Flying Diadem
Dam Moccasin (USA) 1963	Rough Shod (GB); 1944	Dalmary	Blandford
Dam Moccasin (USA) 1963	Rough Shod (GB); 1944	Dalmary	Simons Shoes (Family:5-h)

* Apalachee is inbred 4S x 5D to the stallion The Boss, meaning that he appears fourth generation on the sire side of his pedigree and fifth generation (via Golden Boss) on the dam side of his pedigree.
