= Nonoalco =

American-bred Thoroughbred racehorse (1971–1992)

- Sire: Nearctic
- Grandsire: Nearco
- Dam: Seximee
- Damsire: Hasty Road
- Sex: Stallion
- Foaled: 1971
- Country: United States
- Colour: Bay
- Breeder: Forrest Mars, Sr.
- Owner: María Félix
- Trainer: François Boutin
- Record: 10: 7-1-0
- Earnings: €257,930

Major wins
- Prix Yacowlef (1973); Prix Morny (1973); Prix de la Salamandre (1973); Prix Jacques Le Marois (1974); Prix du Rond Point (1974); British Classic Race wins: 2000 Guineas (1974); Timeform rating: 131
- Last updated on 12 March 2025

Nonoalco (1971–1992) was an American-bred, French-trained Thoroughbred racehorse. He won the 2000 Guineas in 1974.

== Background ==
He was sired by Nearctic, who also sired Northern Dancer, winner of the 1964 Kentucky Derby and Preakness Stakes. His dam was Seximee, a daughter of Hasty Road, winner of the 1954 Preakness Stakes. Nearctic later became a prominent sire during the 20th century.

Nonoalco was bred by American chocolate magnate Forrest Mars, whose mother Ethel V. Mars was a major Thoroughbred owner/breeder through her Milky Way Farm. Nonoalco was purchased and raced by María Félix, a Mexican actress and wife of French financier Alex Berger.

== Racing career ==
Trained by François Boutin, in 1973 at age two Nonoalco had an outstanding year in racing. He won the Prix Yacowlef, Prix Morny and the Prix de la Salamandre, plus he finished second in the Grand Critérium to Nelson Bunker Hunt's colt, Mississippian.

As a three-year-old in 1974, he won the British Classic, the 2000 Guineas at Newmarket Racecourse, beating the odds-on favourite Apalachee into third place. In France, he captured the Prix du Rond Point and the Prix Jacques Le Marois.

== Stud career ==
Retired to stud having won four Group One races, Nonoalco stood in France in 1975 and in Ireland from 1976 through 1981 before being shipped to Japan, where he stood until his death at age twenty-one in 1992. His offspring included Noalcoholic, Katies and Dai Yusaku.

== Pedigree ==
Pedigree of Nonoalco (USA), bay stallion, 1971
Sire Nearctic (CAN) 1954	Nearco (ITY); 1935	Pharos	Phalaris
Sire Nearctic (CAN) 1954	Nearco (ITY); 1935	Pharos	Scapa Flow
Sire Nearctic (CAN) 1954	Nearco (ITY); 1935	Nogara	Havresac
Sire Nearctic (CAN) 1954	Nearco (ITY); 1935	Nogara	Catnip
Sire Nearctic (CAN) 1954	Lady Angela (GB); 1944	Hyperion	Gainsborough
Sire Nearctic (CAN) 1954	Lady Angela (GB); 1944	Hyperion	Selene
Sire Nearctic (CAN) 1954	Lady Angela (GB); 1944	Sister Sarah	Abbots Trace
Sire Nearctic (CAN) 1954	Lady Angela (GB); 1944	Sister Sarah	Sarita
Dam Seximee (USA) 1966	Hasty Road (USA); 1951	Roman	Sir Gallahad
Dam Seximee (USA) 1966	Hasty Road (USA); 1951	Roman	Buckup
Dam Seximee (USA) 1966	Hasty Road (USA); 1951	Traffic Court	Discovery
Dam Seximee (USA) 1966	Hasty Road (USA); 1951	Traffic Court	Traffic
Dam Seximee (USA) 1966	Jambo (USA); 1959	Crafty Admiral	Fighting Fox
Dam Seximee (USA) 1966	Jambo (USA); 1959	Crafty Admiral	Admiral's Lady
Dam Seximee (USA) 1966	Jambo (USA); 1959	Bank Account	Shut Out
Dam Seximee (USA) 1966	Jambo (USA); 1959	Bank Account	Balla Tryst (Family: 2-s)
