= Priory Belle =

Irish-bred Thoroughbred racehorse

- Sire: Priolo
- Grandsire: Sovereign Dancer
- Dam: Ingabelle
- Damsire: Taufan
- Sex: Mare
- Foaled: 10 April 1993
- Country: Ireland
- Colour: Chestnut
- Breeder: Tom Lacy
- Owner: Ballylinch Stud
- Trainer: Jim Bolger
- Record: 6: 2-1-0
- Earnings: £74,623

Major wins
- Moyglare Stud Stakes (1995)

Awards
- Timeform rating 104 (1995)

Priory Belle (10 April 1993 – after 2005) was an Irish Thoroughbred racehorse and broodmare. She showed her best form as a two-year-old in 1995 when she won two of her three races including the Group 1 Moyglare Stud Stakes. She failed to win in three starts in 1996 and was retired to become a broodmare. She had some success as a dam of winners, with the last of her foals being born in 2005.

== Background ==
Priory Belle was a chestnut mare bred in Ireland by Tom Lacy. During her racing career he was trained by Jim Bolger and raced in the colours of the County Kilkenny-based Ballylinch Stud. She was ridden in all but one of her races by Kevin Manning.

She was from the first crop of foals sired by Priolo, a top-class miler who won the Prix Jean Prat, Prix Jacques Le Marois and Prix du Moulin. The best of his progeny included Sendawar, Mirio (Grand Prix de Saint-Cloud), Brilliance (Prix Saint-Alary) and Tigertail (Prix Minerve). Priory Belle's dam Ingabelle showed considerable racing ability, winning the Phoenix Sprint Stakes as a four-year-old in 1988 and was a very successful broodmare, producing Eva's Request (Premio Lydia Tesio) and Wild Bluebell (Concorde Stakes) as well as the dam of Chriselliam. She was a female-line descendant of Princess Sublime, making her a distant relative of Protection Racket.

== Racing career ==
=== 1995: two-year-old season ===
Priory Belle made her first racecourse appearance in a minor race run over six furlongs on firm ground at Fairyhouse on 9 August. Starting at odds of 3/1 in a five-runner field she won by three quarters of a length from the Aidan O'Brien-trained Cashel Princess. Seventeen days after her win at Fairyhouse the filly was stepped up in class and distance for the Listed Debutante Stakes over seven furlongs at Leopardstown Racecourse and finished second of the eight runners, beaten one and a half lengths by the Dermot Weld-trained Dance Design.

Pat Gilson took the ride when Priory Belle moved up into Group 1 class and started a 16/1 outsider for the Moyglare Stud Stakes at the Curragh. The British-trained filly Zelzelah started favourite ahead of Dance Design and Rouge Rancon with the other nine runners included Tamnia (Star Stakes), My Melody Parkes (second in the Lowther Stakes) and Catch a Glimpse (third in the Phoenix Stakes). Priory Belle tracked the leaders as her stablemate Ceirseach set the pace, but began to make good progress in the last quarter mile. She took the lead inside the final furlong and came out on top in a closely contested finish, beating Tamnia by three quarters of a length with My Melody Parkes, Dance Design, Rouge Rancon and Rithab finishing just behind. Just over two lengths covered the first six finishers.

=== 1996: three-year-old season ===
On her three-year-old debut Priory Belle ran on ground softer than she had previously encountered when she contested the Athasi Stakes at the Curragh on 27 April and came home fifth of the seven finishers behind Proud Titania. Four weeks later in the Irish 1000 Guineas she was sent off at odds of 25/1 in a twelve-runner field and although she never looked likely to win but stayed on well in the straight to finish fifth behind Matiya. In June she was sent to England for the Coronation Stakes in which she was able to run on firm ground for the first time as a three-year-old. Starting a 16/1 outsider she finished last of the seven runners behind the French-trained Shake The Yoke. She did not race again and was retired at the end of the year.

== Breeding record ==
After her retirement from racing Priory Belle became a broodmare for the Ballylinch Stud. She produced at least eight foals and four winners between 1998 and 2005:

- Bellflower, a chestnut filly, foaled in 1998, sired by Indian Ridge. Failed to win in five races.
- Kiltubber, bay filly, 1999, by Sadler's Wells. Won two races including the Listed Premio Giovanni Falck. Dam of Fox Hunt (Duke of Edinburgh Stakes), Opinion (The Metropolitan (ATC)) and Anam Allta (Concorde Stakes).
- Seeking Bellissimo, bay colt (later gelded), 2000, by Rainbow Quest. Won one race.
- Waltons Grove, bay filly, 2001, by Machiavellian. Failed to win in six races.
- Silk Mighty, chestnut colt, 2002, by Giant's Causeway. Failed to win in 21 races.
- Unnamed colt, 2003, by Green Desert
- Priory Rock, chestnut filly, 2004, by Rock of Gibraltar. Won one race.
- Lake An Lay, bay colt (gelded), 2005, by Fasliyev. Won one race.

== Pedigree ==
Pedigree of Priory Belle (IRE), chestnut mare, 1993
Sire Priolo (USA) 1987	Sovereign Dancer (USA); 1975	Northern Dancer	Nearctic
Sire Priolo (USA) 1987	Sovereign Dancer (USA); 1975	Northern Dancer	Natalma
Sire Priolo (USA) 1987	Sovereign Dancer (USA); 1975	Bold Princess	Bold Ruler
Sire Priolo (USA) 1987	Sovereign Dancer (USA); 1975	Bold Princess	Grey Flight
Sire Priolo (USA) 1987	Primevere (USA); 1982	Irish River	Riverman
Sire Priolo (USA) 1987	Primevere (USA); 1982	Irish River	Irish Star
Sire Priolo (USA) 1987	Primevere (USA); 1982	Spring Is Sprung	Herbager
Sire Priolo (USA) 1987	Primevere (USA); 1982	Spring Is Sprung	Pleasant Flight
Dam Ingabelle (IRE) 1984	Taufan (USA); 1977	Stop The Music	Hail To Reason
Dam Ingabelle (IRE) 1984	Taufan (USA); 1977	Stop The Music	Bebopper
Dam Ingabelle (IRE) 1984	Taufan (USA); 1977	Stolen Date	Sadair
Dam Ingabelle (IRE) 1984	Taufan (USA); 1977	Stolen Date	Stolen Hour
Dam Ingabelle (IRE) 1984	Bodelle (IRE); 1975	Falcon	Milesian
Dam Ingabelle (IRE) 1984	Bodelle (IRE); 1975	Falcon	Pretty Swift
Dam Ingabelle (IRE) 1984	Bodelle (IRE); 1975	Shade	Gratitude
Dam Ingabelle (IRE) 1984	Bodelle (IRE); 1975	Shade	Summer Tan (GB) (Family: 10)
