= Gala Event =

Irish-bred Thoroughbred racehorse

- Sire: Sallust
- Grandsire: Pall Mall
- Dam: Rosemarin
- Damsire: Mossborough
- Sex: Mare
- Foaled: 24 February 1981
- Country: Ireland
- Colour: Bay
- Breeder: Mrs A W F Whitehead
- Owner: F N Groves
- Trainer: Ted Curtin; John Sullivan
- Record: 17: 5-0-3

Major wins
- Anglesey Stakes (1983); Moyglare Stud Stakes (1983)

Awards
- Timeform rating 112 (1983)

Gala Event (foaled 24 February 1981) was an Irish-bred Thoroughbred racehorse. She was at her best as a two-year-old in 1983 when she won both the Anglesey Stakes and the Moyglare Stud Stakes as well as finishing third in the Phoenix Stakes and fourth in the Cheveley Park Stakes. At the end of the year she was rated the best Irish filly of her generation. After running unplaced in her only appearance of 1984 she was exported to the United States where she won once from nine starts.

== Background ==
Gala Event was a "quite attractive, rather leggy" bay mare with a small white star bred in Ireland by Mrs A W F Whitehead. As a yearling the filly was put up for auction and sold for 25,000 guineas. She entered the ownership of F N Groves and was sent into training in with Ted Curtin near Naas in County Kildare.

She was from the eighth crop of foals sired by Sallust an outstanding miler who won the Sussex Stakes and the Prix du Moulin in 1972. As a breeding stallion, the best of Sallust's progeny included Sanedtki and Tap On Wood. Gala Event's dam Rosemarin was a useful racehorse who won five races in Ireland at the ages of three and four. She was a granddaughter of Rose Bay Willow, who was a half-sister to both Cavan and Indiana.

== Racing career ==
=== 1983: two-year-old season ===
Gala Event began her racing career with a win over six furlongs on good to firm ground at Navan Racecourse in June. Later that month, over the same course and distance, faced eight rivals in the valuable Woodford Stakes and reportedly "cantered" to victory by three lengths. In August the filly was stepped up in class to contest the Group 1 Phoenix Stakes at Phoenix Park Racecourse and was made the 2/1 favourite. After disputing the lead for most of the way she was overtaken in the final strides and finished third behind the colt King Persian and the filly Grey Dream. It was reported that she had lost a shoe during the race. A week after her defeat in the Phoenix, she started odds-on favourite for the Group 3 Anglesey Stakes at the Curragh and won "comfortably" by one and half lengths from Late Sally after taking the lead soon after the start.

On 10 September Gala Event was one of twenty juvenile fillies to contest the Moyglare Stud Stakes over six furlongs at the Curragh and was made the 9/2 second favourite behind the British-trained Desirable (winner of the Princess Margaret Stakes). The other fancied runners included Ballet de France, Ispahan, Shindella (third in the Windsor Castle Stakes) and Bold Meadows. Ridden by Kevin Moses she tracked the front-running Welsh Woman before taking the lead on the outside approaching the final furlong. She held off the challenge of Deirable to win by three quarters of a length with Welsh Woman hanging on to take third place. On her final race the season the filly was sent to England for the Cheveley Park Stakes at Newmarket Racecourse. Ted Curtin had sent out Gentle Thoughts to take the race in 1973 but had not trained a winner in Britain since. Starting the 6/1 second favourite she was in contention for most of the way before being outpaced in the closing stages and finished fourth behind Desirable, Pebbles and the favourite Prickle, beaten just over a length by the winner.

In the official Irish Free Handicap for the two-year-olds of 1983, Gala Event the rated the best filly, albeit fourteen pounds inferior to the top colt El Gran Senor. The independent Timeform organisation gave her a rating of 112, nine pounds behind the French-trained Treizieme who was their best juvenile filly of the season.

=== 1984: three-year-old season ===
Gala Event missed most of her second season through injury and made only one appearance on the racecourse. In September she contested the Barronstown Stud Stakes over seven furlongs at Phoenix Park in which she finished sixth of the eight runners in a race won by the three-year-old colt Red Russell. At the end of the season she was given a rating of 98 by Timeform.

=== 1985 & 1986: North American racing career ===
For the 1985 season, Gala Event was transferred to the United States where she was trained by John Sullivan in California. She made a successful North American debut when she won the Splendid Girl Stakes at Hollywood Park Racetrack on 22 June. She failed to win again that year, with the best of her six subsequent efforts coming when she finished third to Capichi in the Grade II Palomar Handicap.

Gala Event remained in training as a five-year-old but after being beaten in two allowance races at Santa Anita Park in January she did not run again.

== Breeding record ==
Gala Event had no recorded foals and may have died shortly after her retirement from racing.

== Pedigree ==
Pedigree of Gala Event (IRE), bay mare, 1981
Sire Sallust (GB) 1969	Pall Mall (IRE); 1955	Palestine	Fair Trial
Sire Sallust (GB) 1969	Pall Mall (IRE); 1955	Palestine	Una
Sire Sallust (GB) 1969	Pall Mall (IRE); 1955	Malapert	Portlaw
Sire Sallust (GB) 1969	Pall Mall (IRE); 1955	Malapert	Malatesta
Sire Sallust (GB) 1969	Bandarilla (GB); 1960	Matador	Golden Cloud
Sire Sallust (GB) 1969	Bandarilla (GB); 1960	Matador	Spanish Galantry
Sire Sallust (GB) 1969	Bandarilla (GB); 1960	Interval	Jamaica Inn
Sire Sallust (GB) 1969	Bandarilla (GB); 1960	Interval	Second Act
Dam Rosemarin (GB) 1966	Mossborough (GB); 1947	Nearco	Pharos
Dam Rosemarin (GB) 1966	Mossborough (GB); 1947	Nearco	Nogara
Dam Rosemarin (GB) 1966	Mossborough (GB); 1947	All Moonshine	Bobsleigh
Dam Rosemarin (GB) 1966	Mossborough (GB); 1947	All Moonshine	Selene
Dam Rosemarin (GB) 1966	Rose Petal (GB); 1954	Flocon	Fastnet
Dam Rosemarin (GB) 1966	Rose Petal (GB); 1954	Flocon	Fragment
Dam Rosemarin (GB) 1966	Rose Petal (GB); 1954	Rose Bay Willow	Fairhaven
Dam Rosemarin (GB) 1966	Rose Petal (GB); 1954	Rose Bay Willow	Willow Ann (Family: 2-e)
