= Robert Redding =

Robert Redding, Reading, or Reddinge may refer to:

- Rob Redding (born 1976), American journalist and commentator
- Jheri Redding (born Robert William Redding; 1907–1998), American hairdresser
- Robert Reddinge, English friar
- Robert Reading (c. 1640-c. 1689), Irish politician
- Robert Reading (hurdler) (born 1967), American hurdler, winner of the 1989 110 meters hurdles at the NCAA Division I Outdoor Track and Field Championships
