= Priolo (horse) =

American-bred Thoroughbred racehorse

- Sire: Sovereign Dancer
- Grandsire: Northern Dancer
- Dam: Primevere
- Damsire: Irish River
- Sex: Stallion
- Foaled: 1987
- Country: United States
- Colour: Bay
- Breeder: Ecurie Skymarc Farm
- Owner: Ecurie Skymarc Farm
- Trainer: François Boutin
- Record: 15: 6-3-4
- Earnings: $875,427

Major wins
- Prix Matchem (1990); Prix Jean Prat (1990); Prix Jacques Le Marois (1990); Prix du Moulin (1991)

Priolo (foaled March 17, 1987 in the United States) was a French Thoroughbred racehorse. He was bred and raced by Chryss Goulandris' Ecurie Skymarc Farm. In 1990 he won two Group One races and ran second to Saumarez in the Grand Prix de Paris. Sent to Belmont Park in the United States, he was third behind winner Royal Academy and runner-up, Itsallgreektome in the 1990 Breeders' Cup Mile.

In 1991, Priolo won his third Group One event, capturing the Prix du Moulin de Longchamp.

Retired from racing, in December 1991, Priolo was sent to stand at stud in Ireland. The best of his progeny included Sendawar, Priory Belle, Mirio (Grand Prix de Saint-Cloud), Brilliance (Prix Saint-Alary) and Tigertail (Prix Minerve).
