= Sallust (horse) =

British-bred Thoroughbred racehorse

- Racing colours of Michael Sobell
- Sire: Pall Mall
- Grandsire: Palestine
- Dam: Bandarilla
- Damsire: Matador
- Sex: Stallion
- Foaled: 1969
- Country: United Kingdom
- Colour: Chestnut
- Breeder: Ballymacoll Stud
- Owner: Michael Sobell
- Trainer: Dick Hern
- Record: 11: 7-1-0

Major wins
- Richmond Stakes (1971); Diomed Stakes (1972); Prix de la Porte Maillot (1972); Sussex Stakes (1972); Goodwood Mile (1972); Prix du Moulin (1972)

Awards
- Timeform top-rated three-year-old (1972); Timeform rating 134

Sallust (1969–1987) was an Irish-bred British-trained Thoroughbred racehorse and sire. He showed good form as a two-year-old in 1971, winning two of his five races including the Richmond Stakes, but appeared to be just below the highest class. He ran poorly on his three-year-old debut but then won the Diomed Stakes, Prix de la Porte Maillot, Sussex Stakes, Goodwood Mile and Prix du Moulin. By decisively defeating opponents such as High Top and Lyphard he established himself as the best specialist miler in Europe and was rated the best three-year-old of 1972 by Timeform. He returned to Ireland for his stud career and had some success as a sire of winners.

== Background ==
Sallust was a dark chestnut horse with a narrow white stripe and three white socks standing 16 hands 1 1/2 inches high bred by the Ballymacoll Stud in County Meath, Ireland. He was one of the best horses sired by the Queen's stallion Pall Mall, who won the 2000 Guineas in 1958. Sallust's dam Bandarilla won three minor sprint races and produced several other winners. One of her daughters, Right Bank, was the female-line ancestor of the Melbourne Cup winner Shocking.

The colt raced in the colours of the Ballymacoll Stud's owner Michael Sobell and was trained by Dick Hern at West Ilsley in Berkshire. He was ridden in all but one of his races by the British jockey Joe Mercer

== Racing career ==
=== 1971: two-year-old season ===
Sallust showed promise as a two-year-old but also demonstrated a temperamental attitude. He often sweated heavily before his races and was sometime equipped with blinkers. In his first four races he won a maiden race at Salisbury Racecourse over five furlongs and finished a close second to the filly Stilvi in the Group Three National Stakes. In July, Sallust contested the Group Two Richmond Stakes over six furlongs at Goodwood Racecourse. Ridden by Mercer, he started at odds of 2/1 and won from Touch Paper and Yeoman.

=== 1972: three-year-old season ===
On his three-year-old debut, Sallust ran in the 2,000 Guineas Trial at Kempton Park Racecourse in April when he sweated up badly before the race and finished unplaced. At the Derby meeting at Epsom Downs Racecourse the colt started a 14/1 outsider for the second running of the Group Three Diomed Stakes over 8 1/2 furlongs on 7 June. Conceding weight to most of his opponents, he won from Open Season and Roy Bridge.

17 days after his win at Epsom, Sallust was sent to France for the Group Three Prix de la Porte Maillot over 1400 metres at Longchamp Racecourse in Paris and won from Tamiran and Calahorra. He was the first British-trained horse to win the race. Sallust returned to Britain in late July for the Group One Sussex Stakes over one mile at Goodwood in which he was matched against the 2000 Guineas winner High Top. Sallust started at 9/2 and won by a head from High Top with the Queen Anne Stakes winner Sparkler in third place. The winning time of 1:37.39 was a new course record. Over the same course and distance on 25 August, Sallust won the Goodwood Mile at odds of 1/2, beating the Greenham Stakes winner Martinmas and the five-year-old Gold Rod (winner of the 1970 Prix du Moulin). In October (8th), Sallust took on the best of the French milers including the Prix Jacques Le Marois winner Lyphard in the Prix du Moulin over 1600 m at Longchamp. He won the race from Lyphard with the Prix Morny winner Daring Display in third and High Top in fourth place.

== Assessment ==
In the 1971 Free Handicap an official assessment of the best two-year-olds to race in Britain, Sallust was given a rating of 123 pounds, ten pounds below the top-rated Sun Prince, who was also owned by Sobell and trained by Hern. In 1972 the independent Timeform organisation gave Sallust a rating of 134, making him the equal top-rated three-year-old colt in Europe, alongside the sprinter Deep Diver. In their book, A Century of Champions, based on the Timeform rating system, John Randall and Tony Morris placed Sallust in 132nd place in their list of the 200 best British or Irish horses of the 20th century.

== Stud record ==
At the end of his racing career, Sallust was bought for £250,000 by the Irish National Stud to stand as a breeding stallion. The best of his offspring was probably the French-trained filly Sanedtki, whose wins included the Prix de la Forêt, Prix du Moulin and Santa Margarita Handicap. His most successful colt was Tap On Wood who recorded an upset victory over Kris in the 1979 2000 Guineas. He also sired Gala Event, who won the Moyglare Stud Stakes in 1983. Sallust died in 1987 at the age of eighteen.

== Pedigree ==
Pedigree of Sallust (IRE), chestnut stallion 1969
| Sire Pall Mall (IRE) 1955 | Palestine (GB); 1947 | Fair Trial | Fairway |
| Sire Pall Mall (IRE) 1955 | Palestine (GB); 1947 | Fair Trial | Lady Juror |
| Sire Pall Mall (IRE) 1955 | Palestine (GB); 1947 | Una | Tetratema |
| Sire Pall Mall (IRE) 1955 | Palestine (GB); 1947 | Una | Uganda |
| Sire Pall Mall (IRE) 1955 | Malapert (GB); 1946 | Portlaw | Beresford |
| Sire Pall Mall (IRE) 1955 | Malapert (GB); 1946 | Portlaw | Portree |
| Sire Pall Mall (IRE) 1955 | Malapert (GB); 1946 | Malatesta | Sansovino |
| Sire Pall Mall (IRE) 1955 | Malapert (GB); 1946 | Malatesta | Tetranella |
| Dam Bandarilla (GB) 1960 | Matador (IRE); 1953 | Golden Cloud | Gold Bridge |
| Dam Bandarilla (GB) 1960 | Matador (IRE); 1953 | Golden Cloud | Rainstorm |
| Dam Bandarilla (GB) 1960 | Matador (IRE); 1953 | Spanish Galantry | Mazarin |
| Dam Bandarilla (GB) 1960 | Matador (IRE); 1953 | Spanish Galantry | Courtship |
| Dam Bandarilla (GB) 1960 | Interval (GB); 1948 | Jamaica Inn | King Salmon |
| Dam Bandarilla (GB) 1960 | Interval (GB); 1948 | Jamaica Inn | Jamaica |
| Dam Bandarilla (GB) 1960 | Interval (GB); 1948 | Second Act | The Font |
| Dam Bandarilla (GB) 1960 | Interval (GB); 1948 | Second Act | Third Act (Family: 2-o) |
