= Sendawar (horse) =

Irish-bred Thoroughbred racehorse

- Racing colours of Aga Khan
- Sire: Priolo
- Grandsire: Sovereign Dancer
- Dam: Sendana
- Damsire: Darshaan
- Sex: Stallion
- Foaled: 15 April 1996
- Country: Ireland
- Colour: Bay
- Breeder: Aga Khan IV
- Owner: Aga Khan IV
- Trainer: Alain de Royer-Dupré
- Record: 10: 5-4-0
- Earnings: £496,449

Major wins
- Poule d'Essai des Poulains (1999); St James's Palace Stakes (1999); Prix du Moulin de Longchamp (1999); Prix d'Ispahan (2000)

Sendawar (foaled 15 April 1996) was an Irish-bred, French-trained racehorse, who is an active National Hunt Stallion. He was ridden by Gérald Mossé in all his starts.

== Background ==
Sendawar, a dark bay or brown horse, was bred at the Aga Khan Studs in Ireland. He was sired by Priolo who himself won three Group 1 races in France and sired only one other Group 1 winner, namely Mirio. His dam was Sendana, a Darshaan mare, who produced only one other notable progeny, namely Sendoro, who was placed in three Group races.

== Racing career ==
=== 1998: two-year-old season ===
Sendawar raced twice at two – firstly over 1,800m in the Prix de Sablonville when he came half a length second to Royal Line, and secondly in the Prix Adaris over 1,600m when again he came second by one length.

=== 1999: three-year-old season ===
Sendawar lined up in the Prix de Ferrier over 2,200m and went off 7/5 favourite and won "at a canter" by one and half lengths. He then stepped up to Group company in the Prix Greffulhe over 2,100m at Longchamp where he came 4 lengths second to Montjeu, who as a 3 year old won the Prix du Jockey Club, Irish Derby, and Prix de l'Arc de Triomphe, amongst others.

On 6 May 1999, Sendawar dropped back in trip to contest the Poule d'Essai des Poulains at Longchamp over 1,600m. The joint favourites in the race were the unbeaten Dansili and Way of Light, who had won the Grand Critérium. Sendawar won by one and a half lengths from Dansili with Way of Light in 4th.

Next he went onto Royal Ascot to run in the St James's Palace Stakes. He went off as the 2/1 favourite and faced 10 rivals, including Godolphin's Aljabr, the only other Group 1 winner in the field, who having been sent to America to run in the Kentucky Derby was withdrawn due to injury. Sendawar won by one and a quarter lengths from Ajabar with the other rivals trailing another five lengths behind.

It was the aim for Sendawar to face Dubai Millennium in the Prix Jacques Le Marois in the summer, but he was withdrawn due to very soft ground.

On 5 September, he was back at Longchamp as the 4/5 favourite for the Prix du Moulin de Longchamp over 1,600m. He faced his old rivals Dansili, Aljabr, and Way of Light. He won by one and a half lengths from Gold Away with Dansili a further head back in third.

=== 2000: four-year-old season ===
Sendawar started his four-year-old campaign in the Prix d'Ispahan over 1,850m at Longchamp coming up against the Prix d'Harcourt and Prix Ganay winner Indian Danehill. Sendawar won by 3 lengths in "impressive" fashion from Indian Danehill.

Following the Prix d'Ispahan win, he was targeted for the Eclipse Stakes at Sandown; however, he was supplemented for the Prince of Wales Stakes at a cost of £20,000. In the Prince of Wales Stakes, he faced the Dubai World Cup and Queen Elizabeth II Stakes winner, Dubai Millennium, who won, leaving Sendawar trailing eleven lengths back in fourth place.

On 13 August, in his last race, Sendawar was sent off as the 7/10 favourite for the Prix Jacques Le Marois over 1,600m at Deuville and came three lengths second to the Godolphin-trained five-year-old Muhtathir.

It was the intention for Sendawar to run again in the Prix du Moulin de Longchamp, but he was withdrawn from the race, having been retired by his connections.

== Career at Stud ==
At stud Sendawar had limited success, he only had one notable progeny, namely Viva Macau, who earned £441,502 in prize money and who was placed in the Prix Jean Prat, the Hong Kong Classic Mile. Sendawar was then sold to Annshoon Stud in Ireland to become a National Hunt stallion.

== Pedigree ==
Pedigree of Sendawar (IRE), brown stallion, 1996
Sire Priolo (USA) 1987	Sovereign Dancer (USA); 1975	Northern Dancer	Nearctic
Sire Priolo (USA) 1987	Sovereign Dancer (USA); 1975	Northern Dancer	Natalma
Sire Priolo (USA) 1987	Sovereign Dancer (USA); 1975	Bold Princess	Bold Ruler
Sire Priolo (USA) 1987	Sovereign Dancer (USA); 1975	Bold Princess	Grey Flight
Sire Priolo (USA) 1987	Primevere (USA); 1982	Irish River	Riverman
Sire Priolo (USA) 1987	Primevere (USA); 1982	Irish River	Irish Star
Sire Priolo (USA) 1987	Primevere (USA); 1982	Spring Is Sprung	Herbager
Sire Priolo (USA) 1987	Primevere (USA); 1982	Spring Is Sprung	Pleasant Flight
Dam Sendana (FR) 1987	Darshaan (GB); 1981	Shirley Heights	Mill Reef
Dam Sendana (FR) 1987	Darshaan (GB); 1981	Shirley Heights	Hardiemma
Dam Sendana (FR) 1987	Darshaan (GB); 1981	Delsy	Abdos
Dam Sendana (FR) 1987	Darshaan (GB); 1981	Delsy	Kelty
Dam Sendana (FR) 1987	Sherniya (USA); 1980	Empery	Vaguely Noble
Dam Sendana (FR) 1987	Sherniya (USA); 1980	Empery	Pamplona II
Dam Sendana (FR) 1987	Sherniya (USA); 1980	Sherkala	Crepello
Dam Sendana (FR) 1987	Sherniya (USA); 1980	Sherkala	Shahana
