= Jheri curl =

Hairstyle

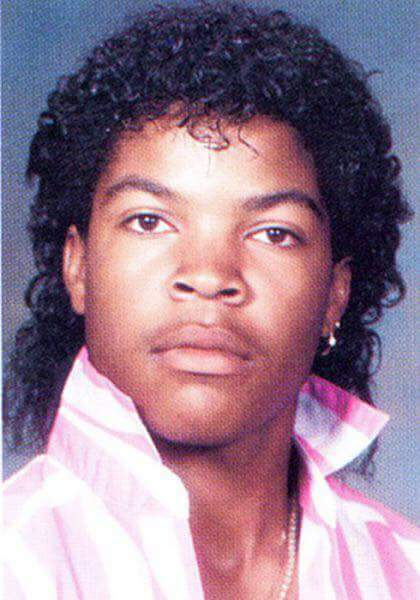
Hip-hop artist and actor Ice Cube sporting a Jheri curl hairstyle in 1987

The Jheri curl (often spelled Jerry curl or Jeri Curl) is a permanent wave hairstyle that was popular among Black Americans, Black Puerto Ricans, Black Dominicans, Black Canadians, Black Brits and Black New Zealanders during the 1980s and early 1990s. Invented by the chemist Jheri Redding, the Jheri curl gives the wearer a glossy, loosely curled look. It was touted as a "wash and wear" style that was easier to care for than the other popular chemical treatment of the day, the relaxer, not a full relaxer to fully straighten the hair, but to make curly hair look loosely curled. Hair appeared wet and glossy by using curl activator which is applied on hair to keep it moist.

== Application and maintenance ==
A Jheri curl requires a two-part application that consists of a softener (often called a "rearranging cream") to loosen the hair, and a solution to set the curls. The rearranging cream uses Ammonium thioglycolate, causing the naturally tight curls to loosen. The looser curls are then set on perm rods and a chemical solution called a neutralizer, usually an oxidizing agent like hydrogen peroxide, is then added to the hair to permanently curl it.

"Perming" is time and labor-intensive, and it is expensive to maintain. The chemicals required for the process often cause the wearer's natural hair to become brittle and dry.

To maintain the look of the Jheri curl, wearers are required to apply a curl activator spray and moisturizers daily, and sleep with a plastic cap over the hair to prevent it from drying out. These products are expensive; a typical bottle of activator was small, retailed from $3 to $6, and was quickly depleted. The activator in particular is very greasy, and it often has the undesirable side effect of staining clothing and furniture.

Washing the hair cleanses it of the styling products and also shows the damage done to the hair by the chemical process. As the hair grows out, the wearer is required to touch up the new hair growth, further adding to the overall expense.

To resolve the problems associated with the cost of the look, Comer Cottrell invented a cheap kit (which he called the "Curly Kit") that could be used at home, thereby enabling lower-income people to copy the style of their idols.

== In media ==
=== Music ===
Edmund Sylvers was the first Black American artist to have the Jheri curl on an album cover, which appears on his 1980 Casablanca release Have You Heard.

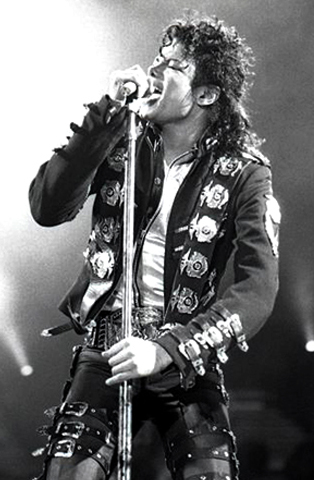
Michael Jackson in 1988

The Jheri curl was worn by Michael Jackson on the cover of his hit album Thriller, which was released in 1982. Jackson also grew out his Jheri curl in 1986, which is shown on the cover of his 1987 album Bad.

Other notable wearers of the style in the 1980s and early 1990s include rappers MC Eiht, DJ Quik, Eazy-E, Ice Cube, Hi-C, Arabian Prince and B.G. Knocc Out.

Singer and songwriter India Arie referenced Jheri curls in her song "I Am Not My Hair", released in 2005. R&B singer Jorja Smith mentioned Jheri curls in her feature on the song "Peng Black Girls", by Enny, released in 2020.

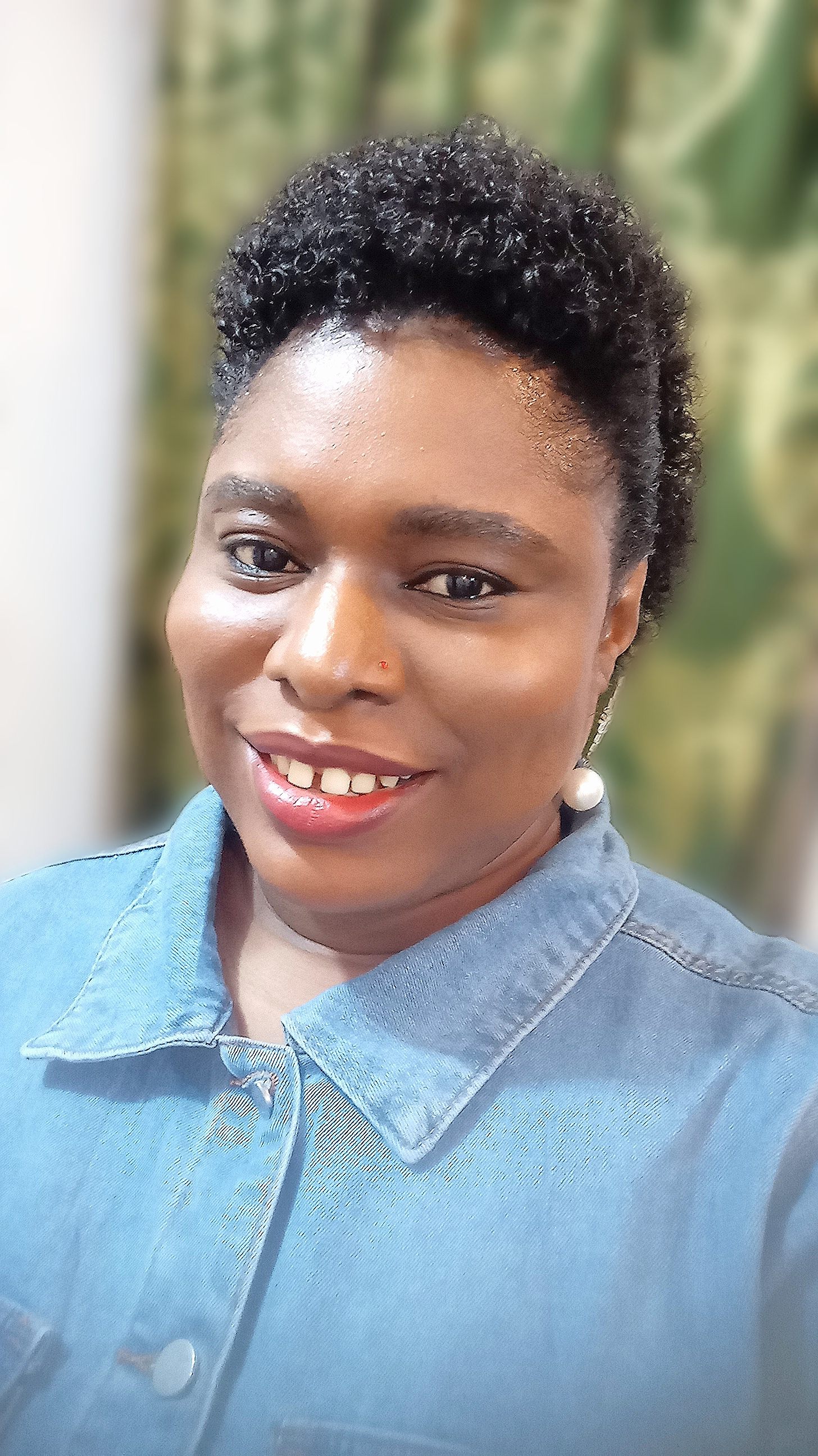
A modern jheri curl

=== Film ===
Keenen Ivory Wayans played a character entitled "Jeri Curl" in the 1987 Robert Townsend film Hollywood Shuffle.

The 1988 comedy Coming to America features Eriq La Salle as Darryl Jenks, heir to the dynasty of a fictional product named "SoulGlo", which gave the wearer a style reminiscent of a Jheri curl while leaving the infamous greasy residue on soft furnishings.

In Samuel L. Jackson's opening monologue in the 1989 film Do the Right Thing, his character (DJ) explains that there is a "Jheri Curl alert" in effect for the day: "If you have a Jheri Curl, stay in the house or you'll end up with a permanent plastic helmet on your head forever."

One of Wayans' recurring characters on In Living Color, Frenchy, also sported a Jheri curl. When attending an Alcoholics Anonymous meeting and hearing others testify to how much they used to drink, Frenchy claimed he was previously "up to three and a half bottles of TCB Lite a day; I switched over to Afro Sheen, and I'm never dry!"

In Living Color also featured a clip called Great Moments in Black History with a spoof of how the Jheri curl was invented. It showed an auto repair shop in July 1979 where a black mechanic with afro named Jerome Johnson was working under a car on a lift. Oil leaked out of the car onto his hair which created Jheri curls, making him famous for inventing it by accident. It then showed a lineup of black men with afros waiting to go under the car to have oil poured on their hair so they could get Jheri curls too.

The character Jules Winnfield (played by Samuel L. Jackson) wears a Jheri curl in the 1994 drama Pulp Fiction. Film critic Owen Gleiberman took it as a "tacit comic statement about the ghettoization of [Black people] in movies".

=== Sport ===
Los Angeles Lakers basketball player Billy Ray Bates was reported to be unpopular with other players "because he had a really moist Jheri curl, and the ball would get all slippery."

== See also ==
- List of hairstyles
