= Rose Royale =

French-bred Thoroughbred racehorse

- Sire: Price Bio
- Grandsire: Prince Rose
- Dam: Rose of Yeroda
- Damsire: Nearco
- Sex: Mare
- Foaled: 1954
- Country: France
- Colour: Bay
- Breeder: Aga Khan III
- Owner: Aga Khan III
- Trainer: Alec Head
- Record: 13: 3-1-1 (incomplete)

Major wins
- 1000 Guineas (1957); Prix du Moulin (1957); Champion Stakes (1957)

Awards
- Timeform rating 129 (1957)

Rose Royale (1954 – 1957) was a French Thoroughbred racehorse. After showing modest form as a juvenile in France she emerged as a top-class performer in the first half of 1957 when she was an unlucky second in the Princess Elizabeth Stakes before winning the 1000 Guineas and finishing third in the Epsom Oaks. In the autumn she added victories in the Prix du Moulin and the Champion Stakes but died at the end of the year.

== Background ==
Rose Royale was a bay filly bred in France by her owner Aga Khan III. During her racing career she was trained by Alec Head at Chantilly.

She was sired by Prince Bio, who won the Poule d'Essai des Poulains in 1944 and became a very successful breeding stallion whose other offspring included Sicambre. Rose Royale was the first foal of her dam Rose of Yeroda who won twice as a juvenile in 1950. She was descended from Honora (foaled 1907), a British mare whose other descendants have included Tap On Wood, Jaazeiro and Skip Away.

== Racing career ==
=== 1956: two-year-old season ===
Rose Royale ran six times as a two-year-old in France in 1956 but failed to win a race.

=== 1957: three-year-old season ===
On her three-year-old debut Rose Royale was sent to England to contest the Princess Elizabeth Stakes over eight and a half furlongs at Epsom Racecourse and looked a most unlucky loser as she finished second to the Queen's filly Carrozza. On 3 May at Newmarket Racecourse the filly started at odds of 6/1 in a 20-runner field for the 144th running of the 1000 Guineas. Ridden by Charlie Smirke, who had been criticised for his performance at Epsom, she won by two lengths from her stablemate Sensualita with the Irish-trained favourite Angelet in third.

The French jockey Jean Massard took over from Smirke when Rose Royale was stepped up in distance and started 11/10 favourite for the Oaks Stakes at Epsom on 7 June. She appeared ill at ease on the firm ground and finished a well-beaten third behind Carrozza and Silken Glider. The filly took a long time to recover from the race and was off the course until September when she finished sixth behind Denisy in the Prix de la Nonette. In the inaugural running of the Prix du Moulin in the following month she was ridden by Roger Poincelet and won from her four-year-old stablemate Chief. Later in October she was back at Newmarket for the ten furlong Champion Stakes and started at odds of 5/2 against opponents including Ballymoss and the Coronation Cup winner Fric. With Massard in the saddle, she came home six lengths clear of the Irish outsider No Complaint, with Fric third and Ballymoss unplaced.

Rose Royale was sent to the United States to contest the Washington D C International but ran poorly and finished unplaced behind Mahan. The filly became sick soon after the race and died from an intestinal tumour.

== Assessment and honours ==
The independent Timeform organisation gave Rose Royale a rating 129 in 1957.

In their book, A Century of Champions, based on the Timeform rating system, John Randall and Tony Morris rated Rose Royale a "superior" winner of the 1000 Guineas.

== Pedigree ==
Pedigree of Rose Royale (FR), bay mare, 1954
Sire Prince Bio (FR) 1941	Prince Rose (GB); 1928	Rose Prince (FR)	Prince Palatine (GB)
Sire Prince Bio (FR) 1941	Prince Rose (GB); 1928	Rose Prince (FR)	Eglantine
Sire Prince Bio (FR) 1941	Prince Rose (GB); 1928	Indolence	Gay Crusader
Sire Prince Bio (FR) 1941	Prince Rose (GB); 1928	Indolence	Barrier
Sire Prince Bio (FR) 1941	Biologie (FR); 1935	Bacteriophage	Tetratema (GB)
Sire Prince Bio (FR) 1941	Biologie (FR); 1935	Bacteriophage	Pharmacie (IRE)
Sire Prince Bio (FR) 1941	Biologie (FR); 1935	Eponge	Cadum
Sire Prince Bio (FR) 1941	Biologie (FR); 1935	Eponge	Sea Moss (GB)
Dam Rose of Yeroda (GB) 1948	Nearco (ITY); 1935	Pharos (GB)	Phalaris
Dam Rose of Yeroda (GB) 1948	Nearco (ITY); 1935	Pharos (GB)	Scapa Flow
Dam Rose of Yeroda (GB) 1948	Nearco (ITY); 1935	Nogara	Havresac (FR)
Dam Rose of Yeroda (GB) 1948	Nearco (ITY); 1935	Nogara	Catnip (IRE)
Dam Rose of Yeroda (GB) 1948	Hastra (GB); 1942	Hyperion	Gainsborough
Dam Rose of Yeroda (GB) 1948	Hastra (GB); 1942	Hyperion	Selene
Dam Rose of Yeroda (GB) 1948	Hastra (GB); 1942	Silver Birch	Blandford (IRE)
Dam Rose of Yeroda (GB) 1948	Hastra (GB); 1942	Silver Birch	Bachelora (IRE) (Family 14-f)
