= Comer Cottrell =

American entrepreneur

Comer Joseph Cottrell Jr. (December 7, 1931 – October 3, 2014) was an American entrepreneur most notable for founding Pro-Line Corp., a business that created the Curly Kit, which brought the Jheri curl hairstyle to the masses and made it easy to achieve at home.

== Biography ==
He was born in Mobile, Alabama, and raised Catholic. He briefly attended the University of Detroit and served in the Air Force during the Korean War.

=== Ventures ===
He founded Pro-Line Corp. in 1970. It was originally based in Los Angeles. In 1979, he created the Curly Kit and in 1980, he moved the company to Dallas. Forbes Magazine called the Curly Kit "the biggest single product ever to hit the black cosmetics market." In 2000, he sold the company to Alberto-Culver for $75 million to $80 million. With his brother, James, he turned Pro-Line into one of the most successful black-owned companies in the United States.

In 1990, he purchased the campus of Bishop College and moved Paul Quinn College from Waco, Texas, to its campus.

Along with George W. Bush and others, Cottrell was part of the team that purchased the Texas Rangers baseball club. He was the first black person to be an owner or part-owner of a major league team.

He wrote an autobiography: Comer Cottrell: A Story That Will Inspire Future Entrepreneurs. He was the first African American member of Dallas’ Citizens Council, and was on the board of many influential banks and companies in Dallas. He helped Ron Kirk get elected as the first African American mayor of Dallas.

=== Death ===
He died in Plano, Texas, at age 82.
