= Tony Piccone =

French jockey

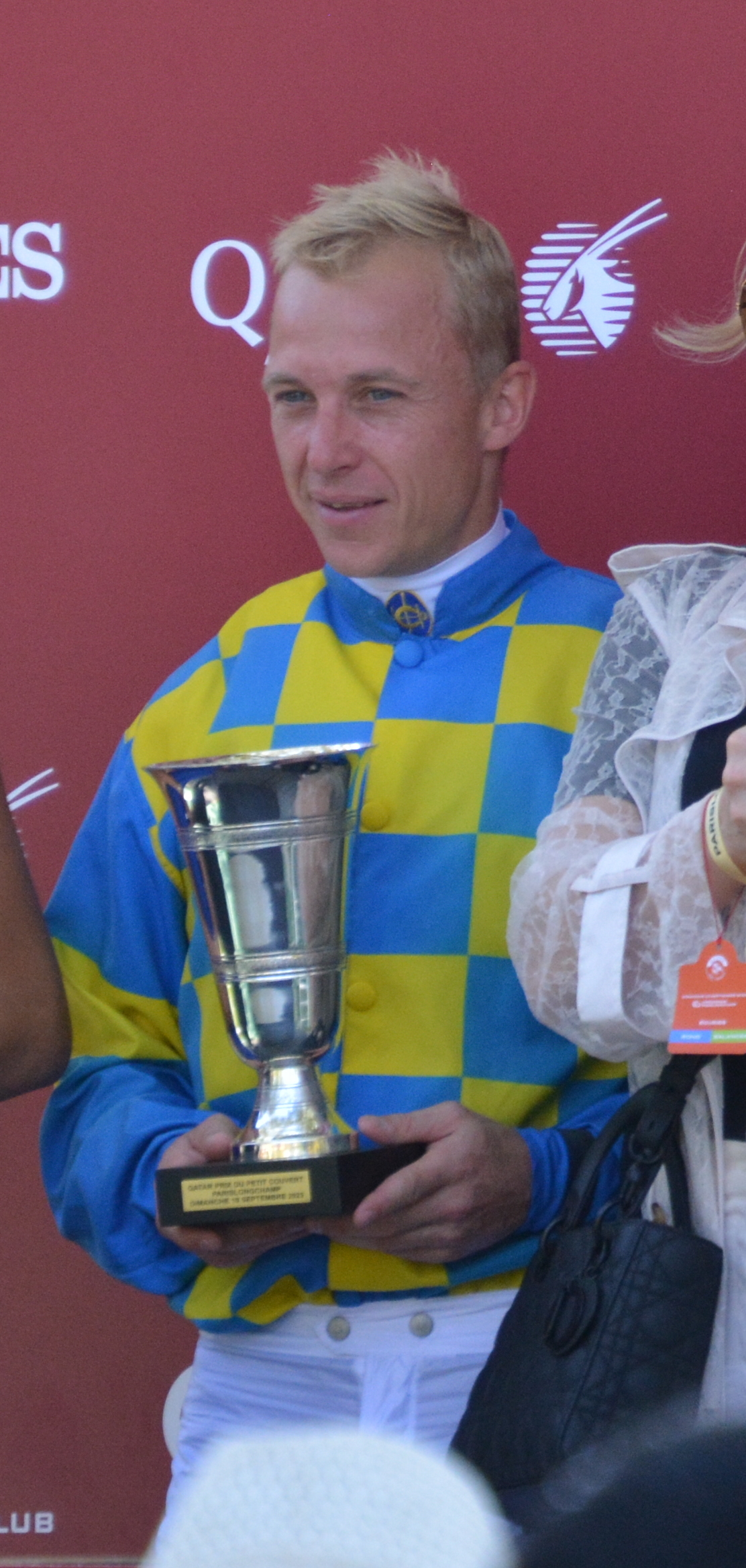

Personal information
- Nationality: French
- Born: 1987 (age 38–39)

Horse racing career
- Sport: Horse racing

Tony Piccone (born 21 July 1987 in Marseille) is a French flat racing jockey. A son of a jockey, he joined an apprentice jockey school in Marseille aged 14 and apprenticed for trainer Cédric Boutin three years later. He has since been a freelance jockey and gets called up on British-trained horses which race in France. He was riding in Hong Kong in January and February 2020 and then again from October 2020 to November 2021. In 2019, he won the group two Qatar Derby aboard Pedro Cara.

== Major wins ==
France

- Criterium de Saint-Cloud - (1) - Robin Of Navan (2015)
- Prix Morny - (1) - Unfortunately (2017)
- Prix Royal-Oak - (1) - Holdthasigreen (2018)
- Prix du Cadran - (1) - Holdthasigreen (2019)
- Prix de Royallieu - (1) - Wonderful Tonight (2020)
- Prix du Moulin de Longchamp - (1) - Sauterne (2023)
- Prix de Diane - (1) - Sparkling Plenty (2024)
