= Pharly =

French-bred Thoroughbred racehorse

- Sire: Lyphard
- Grandsire: Northern Dancer
- Dam: Comely
- Damsire: Boran
- Sex: Stallion
- Foaled: 22 April 1974
- Country: France
- Colour: Chestnut
- Breeder: Jean-Paul Van Gysel
- Owner: Antonio Blasco
- Trainer: John Cunnington, Jr
- Record: 13:5-5-1

Major wins
- Prix de la Forêt (1976); Prix Lupin (1977); Prix du Rond Point (1977); Prix du Moulin (1977)

Awards
- Timeform rating 126 (1976), 130 (1977)

Pharly (22 April 1974 – 10 November 2002) was a French Thoroughbred racehorse and sire. He won five of his thirteen races, finished second five times and third once and was rated among the best colts of his generation in France at two and three years of age. As a two-year-old, he won one minor race in his first four starts but then defeated an all-aged field to win the Group One Prix de la Forêt. In the following year he added major victories in the Prix Lupin, Prix du Rond Point and Prix du Moulin and finished second in the Poule d'Essai des Pouliches, Prix d'Ispahan and Prix de la Forêt. After his retirement from racing he had some success as a breeding stallion in both France and England. He died in 2002 at the age of twenty-eight.

== Background ==
Pharly was a dark-coated chestnut horse with no white markings bred in France by Jean-Paul Van Gysel. He was from the first crop of foals sired by Lyphard, an American-bred stallion who raced in France, winning the Prix Jacques Le Marois and Prix de la Forêt in 1972. Lyphard went on to become a very successful breeding stallion in both Europe and North America, siring Three Troikas, Dancing Brave and Manila. Pharly's dam Comely, was close to top-class as a racehorse (she finished second in the Prix Chloé), and became a very successful broodmare: she had previously produced Comeram the runner-up in Irish 2,000 Guineas and went on to produce the Poule d'Essai des Poulains winner Melyno.

As a yearling Pharly was offered for sale and was bought for ₣140,000 by representatives of Antonio Blasco. The colt was sent into training with John Cunnington Jr., and was ridden in all his major races by Maurice Philipperon.

== Racing career ==
=== 1976: two-year-old season ===
Pharly's early form as a two-year-old was unremarkable: running in maiden races, he finished fourth over 1500 metres at Deauville Racecourse, second over 1400 metres at Maisons-Laffitte Racecourse and second again over 1500 metres at Deauville. He recorded his first success at Longchamp Racecourse winning a minor race over 1400 metres, in which h was receiving weight from the runner-up. Two weeks later, over the same course and distance, Pharly was moved up sharply in class for the Group One Prix de la Forêt. Despite his apparently modest form he was strongly fancied for the race, starting at odds of 3.9/1 in a field of eight runners which included Manado (winner of the Prix de la Salamandre and Grand Critérium), Full of Hope (Prix d'Ispahan), Kesar Queen (Coronation Stakes) and Monsanto (Prix du Rond Point). Kesar Queen made the early running, but Pharly, ridden by Philipperon took the lead soon after half way and won by two lengths from the two-year-old filly Lady Mere, with Manado a length and a half away in third.

=== 1977: three-year-old season ===
In the early part of his second season, Pharly was aimed at the French Classic Races although he was also considered as a possible contender for the 2000 Guineas. On his first appearance as a three-year-old he was matched against Blushing Groom the leading French juvenile of 1976 in the Prix de Fontainebleau over 1600 metres at Longchamp on 3 April and finished third behind Blushing Groom and Water Boy. In the Poule d'Essai des Poulains over the same course and distance three weeks later he started at odds of 9.25/1 and finished second of the six runners, three lengths behind Blushing Groom. On 15 May, the colt was moved up in distance to contest the Prix Lupin over 2100 metres. Starting at odds of 4.3/1 he appeared well-suited by the step up in distance and won by three-quarters of a length from Crystal Palace, with Water Boy finishing third ahead of Carwhite. With Blushing Groom being sent to England for The Derby, Pharly was regarded as a leading contender for the French equivalent, the Prix du Jockey Club over 2400 metres at Chantilly Racecourse on 5 June, starting at odds of 3.25/1 behind the Guy de Rothschild entry consisting of Crystal Palace and Concertino. On this occasion, the distance appeared to be beyond him and he finished eighth behind Crystal Palace, and several other horses he had beaten in the Lupin. Pharly was brought back in distance for the Prix d'Ispahan over 1850 metres at Longchamp three weeks later. In a finish which saw all six of the runners closely grouped throughout, he finished second, a length and a half behind Lightning, an unbeaten colt who started 6/5 favourite.

Pharly was off the racecourse for ten weeks before returning in the Prix du Rond Point over 1600 metres at Longchamp on 4 September. He started favourite and won but half a length and a short neck from River Dane and Monseigneur to whom he was conceding five and six pounds respectively. The Prix du Moulin over the same course and distance three weeks later attracted a small, but high-quality field and Pharly started third favourite behind Lightning and Flying Water, with the field being made up by Monseigneur, Sanedtki, Polyponder and River Dane. Maurice Philipperon tracked the leader Lighting, before sending Pharly up to challenge for the lead into the straight. He took the lead and won "comfortably" by one and a half lengths from Monseigneur, with Sanedtki two lengths back in third. On 23 October, Pharly was made 4/5 favourite against nine opponents as he attempted to repeat his 1976 success in the Prix de la Forêt but was beaten two lengths by Sanedtki after meeting some interference in the straight. Philipperon complained that he had been denied a clear run but Timeform concluded that "probably the best horse on the day won".

== Assessment ==
There was no International Classification of European two-year-olds in 1976: the official handicappers of Britain, Ireland and France compiled separate rankings for horses which competed in those countries. In the French Free Handicap (Handicap Libre), Pharly was rated the second best juvenile of the season, seven pounds behind Blushing Groom and two pounds ahead of Amyntor and J O Tobin. The independent Timeform organisation awarded him a rating of 126, five pounds inferior to their top-rated two-year-old Blushing Groom. In the inaugural International Classification of European three-year-olds, Pharly was rated the joint-sixth best colt behind Alleged, Blushing Groom, The Minstrel, Crystal Palace and Artaius. Timeform gave him a rating of 130, seven pounds below their top-rated horse Alleged, and only a pound behind Blushing Groom.

== Stud career ==
On his retirement from racing Pharly was syndicated at a value of almost £1 million and was retired to become a breeding stallion at the Haras du Bois-Roussel. He was a replacement for Caro who had been exported to the United States. Pharly later stood at the Woodland Stud in Newmarket.

Despite having recorded his biggest wins over 1400, 1600 and 2100 metres, Pharly had his greatest success as a sire of horses who excelled over longer distances, most notably Further Flight, a five-time-winner of the Jockey Club Cup and the Cartier Champion Older Horse in 1995. His other progeny included Busy Flight (Yorkshire Cup), Far Cry (Northumberland Plate, Doncaster Cup), Nicole Pharly (Oaks d'Italia), Wahiba Sands (Ascot Hurdle). Compton Ace (Gordon Stakes), Darly (Prix Exbury) and Phardante (Jockey Club Stakes).

Pharly was euthanised on 9 November 2002 at the age of twenty-eight, after fracturing his pelvis in a paddock accident.

== Pedigree ==
Pedigree of Pharly, chestnut stallion, 1974
Sire Lyphard (USA) 1969	Northern Dancer (CAN); 1961	Nearctic	Nearco
Sire Lyphard (USA) 1969	Northern Dancer (CAN); 1961	Nearctic	Lady Angela
Sire Lyphard (USA) 1969	Northern Dancer (CAN); 1961	Natalma	Native Dancer
Sire Lyphard (USA) 1969	Northern Dancer (CAN); 1961	Natalma	Almahmoud
Sire Lyphard (USA) 1969	Goofed (USA); 1960	Court Martial	Fair Trial
Sire Lyphard (USA) 1969	Goofed (USA); 1960	Court Martial	Instantaneous
Sire Lyphard (USA) 1969	Goofed (USA); 1960	Barra	Formor
Sire Lyphard (USA) 1969	Goofed (USA); 1960	Barra	La Favorite
Dam Comely (FR) 1966	Boran (GB); 1960	Mourne	Vieux Manoir
Dam Comely (FR) 1966	Boran (GB); 1960	Mourne	Ballynash
Dam Comely (FR) 1966	Boran (GB); 1960	Bethora	Clarion
Dam Comely (FR) 1966	Boran (GB); 1960	Bethora	Lady Penn
Dam Comely (FR) 1966	Princesse Commene (GB); 1961	Beau Prince	Prince Chevalier
Dam Comely (FR) 1966	Princesse Commene (GB); 1961	Beau Prince	Isabelle Brand
Dam Comely (FR) 1966	Princesse Commene (GB); 1961	Commemoration	Vandale
Dam Comely (FR) 1966	Princesse Commene (GB); 1961	Commemoration	Anne Comnene (Family 9-f)
