= King Persian =

Irish-bred Thoroughbred racehorse

- Sire: Persian Bold
- Grandsire: Bold Lad (IRE)
- Dam: Naiad Queen
- Damsire: Pampered King
- Sex: Stallion
- Foaled: 14 June 1981
- Country: Ireland
- Colour: Chestnut
- Breeder: Oldtown Stud
- Owner: Seamus McAleer
- Trainer: Liam Browne
- Record: 6: 2-0-0

Major wins
- Phoenix Stakes (1983)

Awards
- Timeform rating 104 (1983), 107? (1984)

King Persian (14 June 1981 – after 1999) was an Irish Thoroughbred racehorse and sire. As a two-year-old in 1983 he won a minor race on his debut and then recorded his biggest win in the Group 1 Phoenix Stakes. He was unplaced in his only other start that season and made little impact in three subsequent races over the next two years. After his retirement he had some success as a sire of National Hunt horses.

== Background ==
King Persian was a chestnut horse bred in Ireland by the Oldtown Stud. He was a very late foal, being born on 14 une, meaning that he was younger than the vast majority of horses of his generation. As a yearling he was put up for auction and sold or 29,000 guineas. During his racing career he was owned by Seamus McAleer and trained in Ireland by Liam Browne.

His sire, Persian Bold was a successful racehorse who won the Richmond Stakes in 1977. He went on to be a "good" stallion, getting important winners such as Kooyonga, Bold Pilot, Persian Heights, Falcon Flight (Prix Hocquart) and Bold Russian (Celebration Mile). King Persian's dam Naiad Queen was a minor winner and a half-sister to the dam of Just A Game. She was distantly descended from the Irish broodmare Garganey, who was the female-line ancestor of Brown Jack, Cavan and Indiana.

== Racing career ==
=== 1983: two-year-old season ===
King Persian made his racecourse debut in a maiden race over six furlongs of firm ground at Gowran Park in July and won easily. In the following month he was stepped up in class and started at odds of 8/1 in a thirteen-runner field for the Group 1 Phoenix Stakes over six furlongs at Phoenix Park Racecourse. The favourite for the race was Gala Event, a filly who was unbeaten in two previous starts, but the rest of the field was undistinguished by Group 1 standards. Ridden by Michael Kinane, King Persian stumbled exiting the starting stalls and settled towards the rear of the field as Gala Event set a very fast pace. The colt produced a very strong finish, caught Grey Dream in the final strides and won by a short head. Racing on softer ground at the Curragh on 10 September King Persian started second favourite for the National Stakes but finished fifth of the eight runners behind El Gran Senor.

At the end of the season, the independent Timeform organisation gave King Persian a rating of 104, making him 27 pounds inferior to El Gran Senor, who was their best two-year-old. In the Irish Free Handicap he was rated 17 pounds behind El Gran Senor, making him the sixth best Irish-trained colt of his generation.

=== 1984 & 1985: three and four-year-old seasons ===
In 1984 King Persian was off the course until August when he returned after an eleven-month absence in a handicap over six furlongs at Leopardstown Racecourse. Carrying a weight of 134 pounds he finished sixth behind the filly Late Sally. Later that month the colt was given a radically different assignment when he was sent to England to contest the Group 2 Great Voltigeur Stakes over one and a half miles at York and finished fifth behind Rainbow Quest. He did not run again that year. Timeform gave him a rating of 107 ?, the "?" indicating that they felt there was insufficient evidence for the rating to be considered accurate.

King Persian remained in training as a four-year-old in 1985 but ran only once, finishing fourth to Kamakura in the Royal Whip Stakes.

== Stud record ==
At the end of his racing career, King Persian was retired to become a breeding stallion in Ireland. He sired a few minor winners on the flat but was more successful as a National Hunt stallion, with the best of his offspring being the Topham Chase winner Cregg House. His last recorded foals were born in 2000.

== Pedigree ==
Pedigree of King Persian (IRE), chestnut stallion, 1981
Sire Persian Bold (IRE) 1975	Bold Lad (IRE); 1964	Bold Ruler	Nasrullah
Sire Persian Bold (IRE) 1975	Bold Lad (IRE); 1964	Bold Ruler	Miss Disco
Sire Persian Bold (IRE) 1975	Bold Lad (IRE); 1964	Barn Pride	Democratic
Sire Persian Bold (IRE) 1975	Bold Lad (IRE); 1964	Barn Pride	Fair Alycia
Sire Persian Bold (IRE) 1975	Relkarunner (GB); 1968	Relko	Tanerko
Sire Persian Bold (IRE) 1975	Relkarunner (GB); 1968	Relko	Relance
Sire Persian Bold (IRE) 1975	Relkarunner (GB); 1968	Running Blue	Blue Peter
Sire Persian Bold (IRE) 1975	Relkarunner (GB); 1968	Running Blue	Run Honey
Dam Naiad Queen (IRE) 1970	Pampered King (GB); 1954	Prince Chevalier	Prince Rose
Dam Naiad Queen (IRE) 1970	Pampered King (GB); 1954	Prince Chevalier	Chevalerie
Dam Naiad Queen (IRE) 1970	Pampered King (GB); 1954	Netherton Maid	Nearco
Dam Naiad Queen (IRE) 1970	Pampered King (GB); 1954	Netherton Maid	Phase
Dam Naiad Queen (IRE) 1970	Invermore (GB); 1961	Anwar	Umidwar
Dam Naiad Queen (IRE) 1970	Invermore (GB); 1961	Anwar	Stafaralla
Dam Naiad Queen (IRE) 1970	Invermore (GB); 1961	Luggeen	Panorama
Dam Naiad Queen (IRE) 1970	Invermore (GB); 1961	Luggeen	Delage (Family: 2-e)
