= Jheri Redding =

American hairdresser (1907–1998)

- Born: Robert William Redding; March 2, 1907; Rantoul, Illinois, U.S.
- Died: March 15, 1998 (aged 91); Santa Barbara, California, U.S.
- Other name: Godfather of Hair
- Occupations: Hairdresser, chemist, and businessman
- Years active: 1925–1990
- Known for: Jheri curl, inventor of hair conditioner

Jheri Redding (born Robert William Redding March 2, 1907 – March 15, 1998) was an American hairdresser, chemist, hair-care products entrepreneur and businessman. Redding is best known for creating the Jheri curl.

Redding is credited with being the inventor of modern-day hair conditioner. He was the first to make "pH balanced" shampoos, to put vitamins in hair care products, and to market added minerals. He developed the perm product Jheri curl, as well as numerous other beauty products. He founded the international beauty products business that bore his name, along with three others.

== Personal history ==
As a young man in Chicago, Redding was teaching chemistry and working as a hair stylist using beauty products that did not perform to his expectations. He began experimenting with chemicals and other ingredients he found in his kitchen, such as mayonnaise and vinegar, to make his own shampoos, rinses and hairdressing solutions to improve the hair of his clients. From his research grew the treatments, styling creams and gels that became known as Jheri Redding Products.

Redding moved to Los Angeles, California, shortly after World War II. Having adopted his unusual nickname along the way, he founded Jheri Redding Products Company in 1956, selling a cream rinse he developed. He later co-founded three other major national hair care companies, Redken in 1960, Jhirmack in 1968, and in 1979, Nexxus, which he said stood for "Nature and Earth United With Science." From the beginning of Nexxus a major disruption in the market place occurred with the introduction of direct to consumer advertising to direct consumers to salons. These companies continue to operate under different ownership. Nexxus became the leader in this marketing technique as developed by Stephen Redding, president of the company. Redding and his management team of family members was the first salon only product company to introduce TV advertising on national scale such as Johnny Carson and the Today Show. Both brand advertising and in association with local salons through co-op program. The introduction of co-op advertising assisted many salons with increasing business of both services and for the first time retail sales of both Nexxus and other products. With the leadership of Redding, his son Stephen Redding, his wife Angie Redding, her sisters Rose Marie Demourkas and Christina Demourkas and, their brother John Demourkas, the beauty salon industry underwent a resurgence still being felt today. With advertising to consumers Nexxus created the first large scale successful retail sales in salons. The other important advancement was development of small number of independent distributors throughout the country rather than direct corporate sales. Also at very large trade shows for professional hairdressers like the one in Chicago, IL or Las Vegas, NV hundreds or thousands of professionals attended classes to listen to and learn directly from Redding.

== Thoroughbred racing ==
Redding raced Thoroughbred horses under the nom de course Jhayare Stables. His most successful runner was Itsallgreektome who was voted the 1990 American Champion Male Turf Horse.

== Marriages and children ==
Redding had four wives: Marjorie Silverman Miller, Selma, Irene J. (divorced March 16, 1979) and Cheryl Shirleen Lugo (divorced), respectively.

Jheri had 3 biological children and 1 adopted:

- Robert William (Bill) Redding (b Jan 6, 1941), married to Linda Anne Redding. Two sons: Robert William Jherimiah Redding (born August 23, 1963) and Thomas James Redding (born March 30, 1970).
- Stephen J. Redding, married to Angie Demourkas. Three children: Elisa, Stephanie, and Jheri (divorced From Gabriella Redding with 2 children, Illiana Rose Redding and Aliyah James Redding). All born in Santa Barbara.
- Robert Dean Redding, Deceased March 1, 1992. One child, Bryce Dean Redding (born July 28, 1985)
- Sean Redding, married to Natalie Moton. Five children together. Natalie and Sean Redding have a reality TV show about life on their farm called "Shear Madness" on Nat Geo Wild.

== Printed works ==
He wrote The Anatomy of a Permanent Wave. Redding also assumed a leadership position in the cosmetics industry and founded the Hollywood Design Council.

== Awards and honors ==
In 1990, Redding was inducted into the National Cosmetology Foundation's Hall of Fame. He was also inducted into the North American Hairstyling Award's Hall of Leaders in 1997.
