= Sanedtki =

Irish-bred, French-trained Thoroughbred racehorse

- Sire: Sallust
- Grandsire: Pall Mall
- Dam: Fortlin
- Damsire: Fortino
- Sex: Mare
- Foaled: 13 April 1974
- Country: Ireland
- Colour: Bay
- Breeder: Jim Powell
- Owner: G. Samana; Bernard Zimmerman; Serge Fradkoff
- Trainer: Olivier Douieb; Charlie Whittingham
- Record: 25:10-7-5

Major wins
- 1,000 Guineas Trial Stakes (1977); Prix d'Astarte (1977); Prix de la Forêt (1977, 1978); Prix Edmond Blanc (1978); Prix de Ris-Orangis (1978); Prix du Moulin (1978); Sierra Madre Handicap (1979); Santa Margarita Invitational Handicap (1979)

Awards
- Timeform top-rated older female (1978); Top-rated older female in Europe (1978); Timeform rating 115 (1976), 126 (1977), 129 (1978)
- Last updated on 9 August 2022

Sanedtki (1974 – after 1993) was an Irish-bred, French-trained Thoroughbred racehorse and broodmare. She was trained in France for most of her career before moving to the United States for her last two races. Although she was capable of competing at the highest level against specialist sprinters, she showed her best form over middle distances.

Having been bought cheaply as a yearling, she showed promise as a two-year-old in 1976 before emerging as a top-class performer in the following year. As a three-year-old she won the 1,000 Guineas Trial Stakes, Prix d'Astarte and Prix de la Forêt, finished third in the 1000 Guineas and the Prix du Moulin and was sold for a hundred times her original price. Sanedtki reached her peak as a four-year-old in 1979, taking the Prix Edmond Blanc, Prix de Ris-Orangis, Prix du Moulin and a second Prix de la Forêt, as well as finishing second in the July Cup and the Vernons Sprint Cup. She ended the season as the highest-rated older female racehorse in Europe by both the official International Classification and the independent Timeform organisation as well as being named champion racehorse of Europe. She was sent to race in California in 1979, where she won both her races including the Grade I Santa Margarita Invitational Handicap. In all she recorded ten wins, seven seconds and five third places in twenty-five races.

After her retirement from racing she became a broodmare, first in the United States and then in Ireland, but was not particularly successful, producing only two minor winners from five recorded foals.

== Background ==
Sanedtki was a bay mare with a narrow white stripe and a white sock on her right hind leg bred in Ireland by Jim Powell (1912–2012). She was from the first crop of foals sired by Sallust an outstanding miler who won the Sussex Stakes and the Prix du Moulin in 1972. Sallust went on to sire the colt Tap On Wood, whose wins included the winner of the 1979 2000 Guineas. Sanedtki's dam, Fortlin, and grand-dam Creepy Crawley were moderate racehorses, but the latter was a half-sister of the July Cup winner Vilmoray.

As a yearling she was offered for sale and bought for 1,050 guineas by a partnership headed by G. Samana. She was sent into training with Olivier Douieb in France. The filly was named by combining the names of her owners, Samana, Nedjar and Tkiar (the partners had another horse named Nedsatki).

== Racing career ==
=== 1976: two-year-old season ===
Sanedtki began her racing career by finishing third to Assez Cuite in the Prix Yacowlef over 1000 metres at Deauville Racecourse in August. After finishing unplaced on her next appearance she won an eight-runner maiden race over 1700 m at Longchamp Racecourse in September. She was then moved up in class for the Group Three Prix des Réservoirs over 1600 m at Longchamp a month later and finished second, a length behind the 20/1 outsider Edinburgh.

=== 1977: three-year-old season ===
In April 1977, Sanedtki was sent to England and was matched against Cloonlara, the leading Irish filly of the previous season, in the 1000 Guineas Trial at Ascot Racecourse. The ground at Ascot was so soft that the starting stalls could not be used and the race was started by flag. Cloonlara was left at the start and Sanedtki won by one and a half lengths from Mofida. In the 1000 Guineas a month later she was restrained in the early stages and was last of the eighteen runners with three furlongs left to run. She made rapid progress in the closing stages without ever looking likely to win, finishing third behind Mrs McArdy and Freeze The Secret. On her return to France she was moved up in distance and finished third to Madelia in the Prix Saint-Alary on 22 May. She raced in England for the third time when she contested the Coronation Stakes at Royal Ascot in June but ran poorly to finish fourth behind Orchestration. She was subsequently revealed to have been in season at the time of the race.

On 7 August, Sanedtki started the 6.3/1 fourth choice in the betting for the Prix d'Astarte over 1600 m at Deauville, in which her opponents included Waya, River Dane (Child Stakes) and Hartebeest (Prix de la Grotte). Ridden as usual by Alain Lequeux, she won by three-quarters of a length from Hartebeest, with Silk Slipper a length away in third. Three weeks later, over the same course and distance, she finished second, beaten half a length by the five-year-old Trepan in the Prix Quincey. In the Prix du Moulin at Longchamp on 25 September, he finished third to Pharly and Monseigneur, with Flying Water in fifth.

In October, Sanedtki was offered for sale at the Polo Club Sale and was bought for ₣1,000,000 (approximately 100 times her price when sold as a yearling) by Bernard Zimmerman. It had been intended that the filly would be exported to race in the United States, but remained in Europe because of quarantine restrictions imposed after an outbreak of metritis in Europe. On 23 October, the filly made her first appearance for her new owners when she started a 16/1 outsider for the Group One Prix de la Forêt over 1400 m at Longchamp. The betting was headed by Pharly and the leading sprinter Gentilhombre, twice winner of the Prix de l'Abbaye. Sanedtki recorded her first Group One success, beating Pharly by two lengths.

=== 1978: four-year-old season ===
Sandetki began her third season on 9 March in the Prix Edmond Blanc over 1550 m at Saint-Cloud Racecourse and won by three lengths from Beaune at odds of 1.3/1. Eighteen day later, she started odds-on favourite for the Prix de Ris-Orangis at Évry and won by half a length from Steel Band. On 1 May she was beaten into second place when attempting to concede ten pounds to the four-year-old colt Faraway Times in the Prix du Muguet at Saint-Cloud. She was then sent to the United States to contest the Metropolitan Handicap at Belmont Park. Racing on dirt for the first time she appeared unsuited by the surface and finished sixth behind Cox's Ridge.

On her return to Europe, Sanedtki, now racing in the colours of Serge Fradkoff, was moved down to sprint distances for the July Cup at Newmarket Racecourse in which she produced a strong late run but failed by a neck to overhaul the favourite Solinus. On 5 August she started odds-on favourite for the Prix Maurice de Gheest at Deauville, but finished third of the twelve runners behind King of Macedon and Polyponder. She then finished second to Kenmare in the Prix Jacques Le Marois over the same course eight days later. On 3 September, Sanedtki started favourite for the Prix du Rond Point over 1600 metres at Longchamp but was beaten into second place by the British colt Homing to whom she was conceding six pounds. Sanedtki clashed with Homing again in the Prix du Moulin at Longchamp three weeks later, when the other runner included Nishapour (Poule d'Essai des Poulains), Kenmare, Carwhite (Prix d'Ispahan) and Dom Racine (Prix Jean Prat). The filly was held up by Lequeux at the rear of the field as Homing set a strong pace. In the straight, Sanedtki produced what Timeform described as a "breathtaking turn of speed" overtaking the whole field and winning by two lengths from Homing, with a gap of five lengths back to Nishapour in third.

On 22 October, Sanedtki attempted to become the first horse in twenty-four years to win consecutive runnings of the Prix de la Forêt, and started 11/10 favourite in a field which included King of Macedon, Faraway Times and Polyponder. She recorded her third Group One win, beating the British-trained outsider Green Girl by two lengths. On her final race in Europe, Sanedtki was brought back in distance for the Vernons Sprint Cup over six furlongs at Haydock Park Racecourse and started favourite ahead of the Ayr Gold Cup winner Vaigly Great. She looked likely to win entering the last quarter mile but was unable to sustain her challenge and was beaten three-quarters of a length by the 20/1 outsider Absalom.

=== 1979: five-year-old season ===
Sanedtki was belatedly sent to the United States in 1979 and was trained in California by Charles Whittingham. Racing at Santa Anita Park she won the Sierra Madre Handicap over six and a half furlongs before ending her career with a victory in the Grade I Santa Margarita Invitational Handicap over nine furlongs.

== Assessment ==
There was no International Classification of European two-year-olds in 1976: the official handicappers of Britain, Ireland and France compiled separate rankings for horses which competed in those countries. The French handicapper awarded her a weight of 121 pounds, five below the top filly Kamicia and eighteen below the top colt Blushing Groom. The independent Timeform organisation rated her on 115 fifteen pounds below the Irish-trained filly Cloonlara and sixteen below Blushing Groom. In the following year, she was rated 126 by Timeform, seven pounds behind their best three-year-old filly Dunfermline. In the official International Classification for three-year-olds she was rated seven pounds inferior to Dunfermline and Madelia, the top-rated fillies. Sanedtki achieved her best Timeform rating of 129 in 1978, making her the highest-rated older female racehorse of the year, alongside Trillion. Her rating placed her a pound behind Timeform's best sprinter Solinus, and a pound behind their best miler Homing. In their annual Racehorses of 1978, Timeform described her as "admirably genuinely and consistent". In the Gilbey Champion Racehorse awards, based on points awarded for performances in major races, Sanedtki was named Champion Racehorse of Europe (jointly with Trillion). In the International Classification for 1978, Sanedtki again tied with Trillion as the best older female racehorse in Europe and the fifth best horse of any age or sex.

== Breeding record ==
Sanedtki was retired from racing to become a broodmare in the United States. She was auctioned three times, being sold for $250,000 in November 1986, for $275,000 in January 1988 (at the sale of Nelson Bunker Hunt's horses) and for $75,000 in November 1989, after which she was sent to continue her breeding career in Ireland. She produced at least five foals between 1982 and 1993:

- Metropolitan Star (bay filly, foaled 1982, sired by Lyphard), won one race
- Blushing Lass (chestnut filly, 1985, by Blushing Groom), unraced
- Skidmore Girl (brown filly, 1988, by Vaguely Noble), failed to win in five races
- Sirsan (bay colt, 1990, by Sir Ivor) won one race, ran in the Irish Derby
- First One Up (colt 1993, by Fairy King), unraced

== Pedigree ==
Pedigree of Sanedtki (IRE), bay mare, 1974
| Sire Sallust (GB) 1969 | Pall Mall (IRE); 1955 | Palestine | Fair Trial |
| Sire Sallust (GB) 1969 | Pall Mall (IRE); 1955 | Palestine | Una |
| Sire Sallust (GB) 1969 | Pall Mall (IRE); 1955 | Malapert | Portlaw |
| Sire Sallust (GB) 1969 | Pall Mall (IRE); 1955 | Malapert | Malatesta |
| Sire Sallust (GB) 1969 | Bandarilla (GB); 1960 | Matador | Golden Cloud |
| Sire Sallust (GB) 1969 | Bandarilla (GB); 1960 | Matador | Spanish Galantry |
| Sire Sallust (GB) 1969 | Bandarilla (GB); 1960 | Interval | Jamaica Inn |
| Sire Sallust (GB) 1969 | Bandarilla (GB); 1960 | Interval | Second Act |
| Dam Fortlin (GB) 1966 | Fortino (FR); 1959 | Grey Sovereign | Nasrullah |
| Dam Fortlin (GB) 1966 | Fortino (FR); 1959 | Grey Sovereign | Kong |
| Dam Fortlin (GB) 1966 | Fortino (FR); 1959 | Ranavalo | Relic |
| Dam Fortlin (GB) 1966 | Fortino (FR); 1959 | Ranavalo | Navarra |
| Dam Fortlin (GB) 1966 | Creepy Crawley (IRE); 1956 | The Bug | Signal Light |
| Dam Fortlin (GB) 1966 | Creepy Crawley (IRE); 1956 | The Bug | Flying Meteor |
| Dam Fortlin (GB) 1966 | Creepy Crawley (IRE); 1956 | Iverley Way | Apron |
| Dam Fortlin (GB) 1966 | Creepy Crawley (IRE); 1956 | Iverley Way | Smoke Alley (Family: 22-a) |
