= Itsallgreektome =

American-bred Thoroughbred racehorse

- Sire: Sovereign Dancer
- Grandsire: Northern Dancer
- Dam: Sans Supplement
- Damsire: Grey Dawn
- Sex: Gelding
- Foaled: 1987
- Country: United States
- Colour: Gray
- Breeder: Sugar Maple Farm
- Owner: Jhayare Stables
- Trainer: Wallace Dollase
- Record: 29: 8-10-2
- Earnings: $1,994,618

Major wins
- Hollywood Derby (1990); Hollywood Turf Cup Stakes (1990); Will Rogers Handicap (1990); Elkhorn Stakes (1991); Keeneland Breeders' Cup Stakes (1991)

Awards
- American Champion Male Turf Horse (1990)

Itsallgreektome (1987–2007) was an American Thoroughbred Champion racehorse owned by Jheri Redding who raced under the nom de course Jhayare Stables. Sired by Sovereign Dancer, who also sired Preakness Stakes winners Gate Dancer and Louis Quatorze, he was out of the mare Sans Supplement, a daughter of Grey Dawn, who was a multiple stakes winner in France.

The winner of top stakes races in 1990, he ran second to Royal Academy in the 1990 Breeders' Cup Mile and his performances over the year earned him American Champion Male Turf Horse honors. In 1991, Itsallgreektome equaled the Keeneland Race Course record for nine furlongs on grass with a winning time of 1:48.42. That year, he was second in the Breeders' Cup Turf to winner Miss Alleged.

A gelding, Itsallgreektome was retired to Cardiff Farm in Creston, California. He was euthanized on February 15, 2007, due to the infirmities of old age.
