= Prix du Moulin de Longchamp =

Flat horse race in France

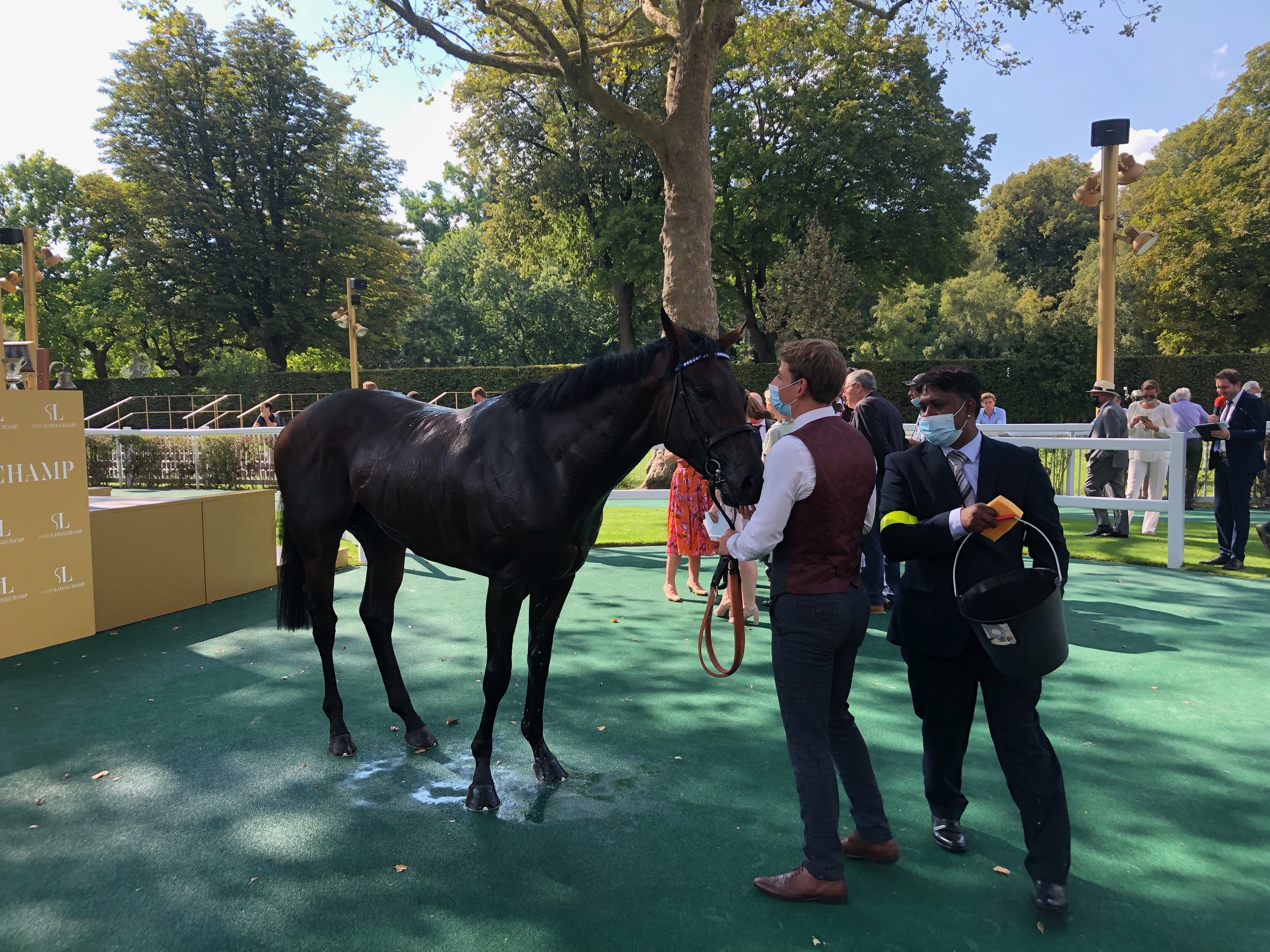
- Baaeed after winning the 2021 running
- Class: Group 1
- Location: Longchamp Racecourse; Paris, France
- Inaugurated: 1957
- Race type: Flat / Thoroughbred
- Sponsor: Qatar
- Website: france-galop.com

Race information
- Distance: 1,600 metres (1 mile)
- Surface: Turf
- Track: Right-handed
- Qualification: Three-years-old and up
- Weight: 56½ kg (3yo); 58½ kg (4yo+); Allowances; 1½ kg for fillies and mares
- Purse: €450,000 (2021); 1st: €257,130

Prix du Moulin de Longchamp
2026
Erdenali	Ten Bob Tony	Gstaad

Previous years
2025
Sahlan	Rosallion	The Lion In Winter
2024
Tribalist	Charyn	Henry Longfellow
2023
Sauterne	Big Rock	Facteur Cheval
2022
Dreamloper	Order Of Australia	The Revenant
2021
Baaeed	Order Of Australia	Victor Ludorum

2020-2011
2020
Persian King	Pinatubo	Circus Maximus
2019
Circus Maximus	Romanised	Line of Duty
2018
Recoletos	Wind Chimes	Expert Eye
2017
Ribchester	Taareef	Massaat
2016
Vadamos	Spectre	Zelzal
2015
Ervedya	Akatea	Karakontie
2014
Charm Spirit	Toronado	Night Of Thunder
2013
Maxios	Olympic Glory	Anodin
2012
Moonlight Cloud	Farhh	Sarkiyla
2011
Excelebration	Rio De La Plata	Rajsaman

2010–2001
2010
Fuisse	Rio De La Plata	Siyouni
2009
Aqlaam	Famous Name	Virtual
2008
Goldikova	Darjina	Sageburg
2007
Darjina	Ramonti	George Washington
2006
Librettist	Stormy River	Manduro
2005
Starcraft	Gorella	Majors Cast
2004
Grey Lilas	Diamond Green	Antonius Pius
2003
Nebraska Tornado	Lohengrin	Bright Sky
2002
Rock Of Gibraltar	Banks Hill	Gossamer
2001
Slickly	Banks Hill	Hawkeye

2000–1991
2000
Indian Lodge	Kingsalsa	Diktat
1999
Sendawar	Gold Away	Dansili
1998
Desert Prince	Gold Away	Second Empire
1997
Spinning World	Helissio	Daylami
1996
Ashkalani	Spinning World	Shake The Yoke
1995
Ridgewood Pearl	Shaanxi	Missed Flight
1994
Ski Paradise	East Of The Moon	Green Tune
1993
Kingmambo	Ski Paradise	Bigstone
1992
All At Sea	Brief Truce	Hatoof
1991
Priolo	Mukaddamah	Lycius

1990–1987
1990
Distant Relative	Linamix	Priolo
1989
Polish Precedent	Squill	Cadeaux Genereux
1988
Soviet Star	Miesque	Gabina
1987
Miesque	Soviet Star	Grecian Urn

The Prix du Moulin de Longchamp is a Group 1 flat horse race in France open to horses aged three years or older. It is run at Longchamp over a distance of 1,600 metres (about 1 mile), and it is scheduled to take place each year in September.

== History ==
The event is named after the Moulin de Longchamp, a windmill located within the grounds of the racecourse. The mill was originally part of an abbey, and its foundation stone was laid by Saint Louis in 1256. It was destroyed during the French Revolution, but reconstructed when the racecourse was built in 1856.

The Prix du Moulin de Longchamp was one of two major races introduced to celebrate Longchamp's centenary in 1957. Both initially took place on the first Sunday in October, the same day as the Prix de l'Arc de Triomphe. The other race, the Prix de l'Abbaye de Longchamp, is still held at that meeting.

The Prix du Moulin was moved to late September in 1974, and to the first Sunday of that month in 1980. It was formerly contested on Longchamp's middle course (the moyenne piste), but was switched to the main course (the grande piste) in 1987. The race was rescheduled for mid-September in 2011.

The race was opened to geldings from the 2020 running.

== Records ==
Most successful horse:

- no horse has won this race more than once

Leading jockey (6 wins):

- Cash Asmussen – Mendez (1984), Soviet Star (1988), Polish Precedent (1989), Kingmambo (1993), Spinning World (1997), Indian Lodge (2000)

Leading trainer (8 wins):

- André Fabre – Soviet Star (1988), Polish Precedent (1989), Ski Paradise (1994), Nebraska Tornado (2003), Grey Lilas (2004), Vadamos (2016), Persian King (2020), Tribalist (2024)

Leading owner (5 wins):

- Godolphin – Slickly (2001), Librettist (2006), Ribchester (2017), Persian King (2020), Tribalist (2024)

== Winners since 1975 ==
Year	Winner	Age	Jockey	Trainer	Owner	Time
1974	Mount Hagen	3	Philippe Paquet	Angel Penna	Daniel Wildenstein	1:48.5
1975	Delmora	3	Philippe Paquet	François Boutin	Gerry Oldham	1:41.00
1976	Gravelines	4	Yves Saint-Martin	Angel Penna	Daniel Wildenstein	1:42.00
1977	Pharly	3	Maurice Philipperon	John Cunnington Jr.	Antonio Blasco	1:40.60
1978	Sanedtki	4	Alain Lequeux	Olivier Douieb	Serge Fradkoff	1:37.90
1979	Irish River	3	Maurice Philipperon	John Cunnington Jr.	Mrs Raymond Adès	1:38.80
1980	Kilijaro	4	Freddy Head	Olivier Douieb	Serge Fradkoff	1:36.90
1981	Northjet	4	Freddy Head	Olivier Douieb	Serge Fradkoff	1:35.20
1982	Green Forest	3	Alfred Gibert	Mitri Saliba	Mahmoud Fustok	1:34.90
1983	Luth Enchantee	3	Maurice Philipperon	John Cunnington Jr.	Paul de Moussac	1:38.90
1984	Mendez	3	Cash Asmussen	François Boutin	Philip Niarchos	1:43.40
1985	Rousillon	4	Greville Starkey	Guy Harwood	Khalid Abdullah	1:39.00
1986	Sonic Lady	3	Walter Swinburn	Michael Stoute	Sheikh Mohammed	1:35.80
1987	Miesque	3	Freddy Head	François Boutin	Stavros Niarchos	1:37.50
1988	Soviet Star	4	Cash Asmussen	André Fabre	Sheikh Mohammed	1:40.30
1989	Polish Precedent	3	Cash Asmussen	André Fabre	Sheikh Mohammed	1:38.50
1990	Distant Relative	4	Pat Eddery	Barry Hills	Wafic Saïd	1:38.30
1991	Priolo	4	Gérald Mossé	François Boutin	Ecurie Skymarc Farm	1:38.40
1992	All At Sea	3	Pat Eddery	Henry Cecil	Khalid Abdullah	1:40.70
1993	Kingmambo	3	Cash Asmussen	François Boutin	Stavros Niarchos	1:37.60
1994	Ski Paradise	4	Yutaka Take	André Fabre	Teruya Yoshida	1:37.80
1995	Ridgewood Pearl	3	Johnny Murtagh	John Oxx	Anne Coughlan	1:36.90
1996	Ashkalani	3	Gérald Mossé	Alain de Royer-Dupré	Aga Khan IV	1:37.20
1997	Spinning World	4	Cash Asmussen	Jonathan Pease	Niarchos Family	1:37.10
1998	Desert Prince	3	Olivier Peslier	David Loder	Lucayan Stud	1:40.90
1999	Sendawar	3	Gérald Mossé	Alain de Royer-Dupré	Aga Khan IV	1:35.20
2000	Indian Lodge	4	Cash Asmussen	Amanda Perrett	Cohn / Parker	1:40.80
2001	Slickly	5	Frankie Dettori	Saeed bin Suroor	Godolphin	1:39.00
2002	Rock of Gibraltar	3	Michael Kinane	Aidan O'Brien	Ferguson / Magnier	1:39.30
2003	Nebraska Tornado	3	Richard Hughes	André Fabre	Khalid Abdullah	1:38.70
2004	Grey Lilas	3	Éric Legrix	André Fabre	Gestüt Ammerland	1:37.50
2005	Starcraft	5	Christophe Lemaire	Luca Cumani	The Australian Syndicate	1:36.10
2006	Librettist	4	Frankie Dettori	Saeed bin Suroor	Godolphin	1:38.10
2007	Darjina	3	Christophe Soumillon	Alain de Royer-Dupré	Zahra Aga Khan	1:36.80
2008	Goldikova	3	Olivier Peslier	Freddy Head	Wertheimer et Frère	1:36.70
2009	Aqlaam	4	Richard Hills	William Haggas	Hamdan Al Maktoum	1:38.87
2010	Fuisse	4	Stéphane Pasquier	Criquette Head-Maarek	Haras du Quesnay	1:37.83
2011	Excelebration	3	Jamie Spencer	Marco Botti	Giuliano Manfredini et al.	1:37.74
2012	Moonlight Cloud	4	Thierry Jarnet	Freddy Head	George Strawbridge	1:36.90
2013	Maxios	5	Stéphane Pasquier	Jonathan Pease	Niarchos Family	1:40.73
2014	Charm Spirit	3	Thierry Jarnet	Freddy Head	Abdullah bin Khalifa Al Thani	1:35.90
2015	Ervedya	3	Christophe Soumillon	Jean-Claude Rouget	Aga Khan IV	1:42.26
2016	Vadamos^{[a]}	5	Vincent Cheminaud	André Fabre	Haras de Saint Pair	1:38.27
2017	Ribchester^{[a]}	4	James Doyle	Richard Fahey	Godolphin	1:40.75
2018	Recoletos	4	Olivier Peslier	Carlos Laffon-Parias	Sarl Darpat France	1:36.00
2019	Circus Maximus	3	Ryan Moore	Aidan O'Brien	Flaxman Stables, Smith / Magnier / Tabor	1:36.54
2020	Persian King	4	Pierre-Charles Boudot	André Fabre	Godolphin SNC & Ballymore Thoroughbred Ltd	1:36.73
2021	Baaeed	3	Jim Crowley	William Haggas	Shadwell Estate	1:39.13
2022	Dreamloper	5	Kieran Shoemark	Ed Walker	J Fill	1:36.14
2023	Sauterne	3	Tony Piccone	Patrice Cottier	Jean-Pierre-Joseph Dubois	1:36.76
2024	Tribalist	5	Mickael Barzalona	André Fabre	Godolphin SNC	1:38.75
2025	Sahlan	5	Mickael Barzalona	Francis-Henri Graffard	Al Shaqab Racing	1:35.39
2026	Erdenali	3	Mickael Barzalona	Francis-Henri Graffard	Aga Khan Stud	1:33.01

^{a} The 2016 and 2017 races took place at Chantilly while Longchamp was closed for redevelopment.

== Earlier winners ==
- 1957: Rose Royale
- 1958: Lilya
- 1959: Ginetta
- 1960: Mincio
- 1961: Belle Shika
- 1962: Romulus
- 1963: Hula Dancer
- 1964: Mirna
- 1965: Red Slipper
- 1966: Silver Shark
- 1967: Great Nephew
- 1968: Pola Bella
- 1969: Habitat
- 1970: Gold Rod
- 1971: Faraway Son
- 1972: Sallust
- 1973: Sparkler

== See also ==
- List of French flat horse races
