= Sovereign Dancer =

American-bred Thoroughbred racehorse

- Sire: Northern Dancer
- Grandsire: Nearctic
- Dam: Bold Princess
- Damsire: Bold Ruler
- Sex: Stallion
- Foaled: 1975
- Country: United States
- Colour: Bay
- Breeder: Ogden Mills Phipps
- Owner: Alec Head
- Trainer: Criquette Head-Maarek
- Record: 14: 2-4-1
- Earnings: US$50,353 (equivalent)
- Last updated on July 23, 2008

Sovereign Dancer (January 24, 1975 – December 25, 1993) was an American Thoroughbred racehorse best known as a sire of two American Classic Race winners.

== Background ==
Bred by Ogden Mills Phipps, he was a son of the most important sire of the 20th Century, Northern Dancer and from the mare Bold Princess, a daughter of the eight-time Leading sire in North America, Bold Ruler.

== Racing career ==
At age four Sovereign Dancer was sold to Alec Head's Haras du Quesnay near Deauville in the Lower Normandy region of France where he compiled a record of two wins, three seconds, and a third in ten starts on grass for trainer Criquette Head-Maarek. Sovereign Dancer won his debut in France in April 1979 at Maisons-Laffitte Racecourse and won in his fourth start at the Evry Racecourse. His best result in a Conditions race was a second in the Group 3 Grand Prix de Vichy.

== Stud record ==
Retired from racing after the 1979 season, Sovereign Dancer returned to stand at stud in the United States. A successful sire, some of his important sons include:

- Gate Dancer (b. 1981), won 1984 Preakness Stakes
- Itsallgreektome (b. 1987), the 1990 American Champion Male Turf Horse
- Priolo (b. 1987), winner of three Group One races in France
- Louis Quatorze (b. 1993), equalled race record time in winning the 1996 Preakness Stakes
- Double Orphan (b. 1994), 2000 Champion Older Male Horse in Puerto Rico
- Moment of Glory (b. 1994), Champion Stayer in India

Damsire:

- Disturbingthepeace (b. 1998), multiple stakes winner
